= Cognitive Information Processing (Career Services) =

The Cognitive Information Processing (CIP) Approach to Career Development and Services is a theory of career problem solving and decision making that was developed through the joint efforts of a group of researchers at the Florida State University Career Center's Center for the Study of Technology in Counseling and Career Development.

CIP theory asserts that the major components involved in determining career decision-making and problem-solving effectiveness are the content and process of career decisions. The importance of the content and process in career decision making can be described by using a metaphor of a recipe. To make a good dish (decision) one must have all necessary ingredients (content), and know how to follow cooking instructions (process).

== Description ==
In terms of career problem-solving and decision-making, the content includes everything one must know to make an effective decision, including knowledge about oneself (values, interests, skills, employment preferences), knowledge about options; knowledge about decision-making skills—and knowledge about the thoughts, emotions, and metacognitions (self-talk, self-awareness, monitoring and control) that are involved. Each of these areas are categorized into domains of information processing, which include the knowledge domain (self-knowledge and options knowledge), the decision-making skills domain, and the executive processing domain (thoughts, emotions, and metacognitions). An analogy of a computer can be used to describe how these domains interact to determine decision-making effectiveness. The knowledge domain is similar to the files of information stored on a computer, the decision-making skills domain is similar to a computer's hardware and software that make use of the files in a meaningful way, and the executive processing domain can be likened to a computer's brain or motherboard that dictates the computer's overall functionality. These domains are depicted through a diagram of a pyramid.

The process involves everything one must do to make an effective decision, including: defining the gap between where one is and where one wants to be, gaining a better understanding of oneself and one's options, expanding and narrowing a list of options, valuing and prioritizing remaining options resulting in a first choice, executing the choice by developing a plan of action for implementation, and reflecting back upon the choice. This process can be broken down into five stages (Communication, Analysis, Synthesis, Valuing, Execution) which form the CASVE decision-making cycle that one continually navigates throughout their career development.

Practical application of CIP theory has evolved since 1971 into a cost-effective, self-directed approach to career service delivery in use at the Florida State University Career Center and in many other settings both nationally and globally. The CIP approach is intended to translate theory into practice to help individuals make appropriate current career choices, and learn improved problem-solving and decision-making skills needed for future choices. The CIP approach to career-service delivery includes a number of key elements that can be incorporated by any career center or career-service program as long as certain assumptions are met (multiple staff members, variety of available resources, etc.).

== Key elements ==
The key elements of the CIP approach are broken down into a seven-step service delivery model:

1. Screen individuals for career decision-making readiness before delivering services

- Increases the likelihood that the services delivered are congruent with individual needs
- Allows staff to serve more individuals with brief interventions
- Allows more time to deliver intensive interventions to assist individuals with extensive needs
- Helps to understand why individuals are seeking career assistance and judge their decision-making readiness
- If no concrete request for information is made and a potential problems is indicated (indecision, confusion, or disabling emotions), then more comprehensive screening is likely needed

2. Match level of staff assistance to identified individual needs

- Individuals who have a high level of readiness for decision making are referred to self-help career services, where they select, locate, sequence, and use needed resources with little assistance from staff
- Individuals who have a moderate level of readiness for decision making are referred to brief staff-assisted services, where the staff member and client collaboratively plan the use of resources and services necessary to solve the career problem
- Individuals who have a low level of readiness for decision making are ideally referred to individual case-managed services
- The resulting net effect of the CIP approach is to limit expensive services (in terms of staff resources) to individuals with more extensive needs

3. Use career theory to help individuals understand and manage career decision making

- Helps the practitioner decide how much and what type of assistance individuals need to solve career problems
- Helps individuals understand the content and process of career decision making to create a cognitive framework which helps reduce ambiguity, manage information, and provide clear criteria for self-monitoring of progress

4. Use print and online career resources within all levels of service delivery

- Provides individuals with self-help access to resources that meet identified learning needs
- Resources should be used to augment brief staff-assisted and individual case-managed services
- The effectiveness of a career resource room is dependent on having a classification schema and index for organizing and identifying resources, and a comfortable physical space to use resources

5. Use career resources that are appropriate for diverse individual learners

- Resources available in the career resource room should be appropriate for the inherent diversity in individuals’ verbal aptitude, motivation, and learning styles
- In terms of verbal aptitude, it is particularly important for resources to be available in a wide range of readability
- In terms of motivation and learning style, traditional text-based resources need to be supplemented with video and interactive computer-based resources that may be more reinforcing for some learners
- Care also needs to be taken that individuals’ physical disabilities do not prevent them from accessing resources in career resource rooms, and web sites should be accessible through text readers for persons with visual disabilities

6. Use staff teamwork in delivering services to individuals

- Clients being served with brief staff-assisted services work with a variety of different staff members to solve a career problem.
- Continuity in service delivery resides in the collaboratively developed Individualized Learning Plan (ILP)
- Benefits to the individual include not being restricted to the available appointment times of any one practitioner, and being able to decide how quickly they will use available resources and services
- Staff members must be able to quickly establish helping relationships, clarify client progress in completing the ILP, and subsequently revise the ILP if new needs emerge

7. Provide common staff training for delivering resources and services

- Common training experiences among staff are needed to reduce the likelihood of inconsistent or disjointed service delivery when multiple staff serve one individual
- All staff must be familiar with the theoretical basis of service delivery to help clients understand and manage the career decision-making process
- Staff must be competent in the use of career assessment, intervention planning, information, and instructional resources

== Relationship to cognitive therapy ==
CIP theory is based on cognitive therapy concepts developed by Aaron Beck, which specify that dysfunctional cognitions have a detrimental impact on behavior and emotions. Through cognitive restructuring, collaborative empiricism, attention to emotions, and the development of an effective helping relationship, clients learn to replace dysfunctional cognitions with functional cognitions, resulting in positive changes in behavior and emotions. Dysfunctional cognitions have been determined to interfere with the different components of the CIP approach (self-knowledge, options knowledge, communication, analysis, synthesis, valuing, execution, and executive processing); and the assumptions, attitudes, behaviors, beliefs, feelings, plans, and/or strategies related to career problem solving and decision making must be considered when providing career counseling services.

== Related assessment tool ==
The Career Thoughts Inventory (CTI) was developed to measure dysfunctional career thoughts, and an accompanying workbook (Improving Your Career Thoughts: A Workbook for the Career Thoughts Inventory) was created to help clients restructure and improve their career thinking. The CTI was developed to integrate the functions of assessment and intervention within a career service delivery context by linking the measure and workbook in such a way that clients can more effectively incorporate the assessment concepts into intervention strategies for change.

The CTI is designed to be used with high school juniors and seniors who may be choosing a post-secondary field of study, choosing an occupation, or seeking employment; college students who may be choosing a major field of study, choosing an occupation, or seeking employment; and adults who are considering an occupational or employment change, seeking employment due to unemployment or underemployment, or reentering the labor market after a substantial period of non-paid work. The readability of the CTI and the CTI Workbook was calculated to be at a 6.4 and 7.7 grade level, respectively.

To facilitate quick completion, scoring, and instrument profiling, and avoid service delivery delays or disruptions, the CTI combines the inventory, answer sheet, and profile form into one booklet. The Test Booklet can be quickly scored by clients, human service practitioners, or clerical support staff. The CTI Profile is printed on the back page of the booklet.

In service delivery, the CTI can be used by practitioners to help adults, college students, and high school students identify, challenge, and subsequently alter dysfunctional thinking that impairs their ability to effectively solve career problems and make career decisions. Specifically, the CTI can be used as an instrument for screening and needs assessment, as well as a learning resource in delivering career services. The CTI Professional Manual provides additional details on the use of the CTI and CTI Workbook, including specific strategies for individual counseling, group counseling, self-directed career decision making, workshops and curricular interventions.

The reliability (internal consistency, stability), validity (content, construct, convergent), and factor structure of the CTI have been well established. A number of empirical studies have been conducted and have found strong relationships in the expected directions between dysfunctional career thoughts various other constructs (vocational identity, certainty, and knowledge about occupations and training, indecision, neuroticism, vulnerability, angry hostility, self-consciousness, impulsiveness, comfort with choice, lack of information needs, anxiety, depression, self-clarity, decision-making style, cognitive thought patterns, emotional intelligence, symptoms of trauma, self-efficacy, satisfaction with occupational choice, attachment anxiety and avoidance, and others.

The CTI was designed to be quickly administered (most clients complete the 48 CTI items in 7 to 15 minutes) and scored (and scored in 5 to 8 minutes). As a result, the CTI can be used as part of a brief intake procedure or during an initial session. The CTI Workbook presents interpretive information for all four scales with text, metaphors, and illustrations that practitioners can use to facilitate interpretation of CTI results. The workbook also has several components that can be assigned as homework, such as cognitive restructuring of negative thoughts, developing an individual action plan for using career resources and services, and learning about the decision-making process. Finally, the CTI Test Booklet and the CTI Workbook are relatively inexpensive to purchase and the hand scoring feature eliminates scoring processing fees.
