= Rational depression =

Reason-guided psychological depression

Rational depression is reason-guided psychological depression. It can arise from adverse life circumstances. Such depression may not be responsive to traditional depression therapies.

== Recognition ==
Traditionally, cognitive therapists have asserted that there is no such thing as a rational depression since, while sadness can be a natural response to loss or disappointment, depression results from distorted thoughts. Christian leaders (such as John Cassian, Isidore of Seville, Bede) recognized the distinction between “irrational” depression (which emerged frequently without any antecedent stressor and was therefore seemingly from God) and “rational” depression.

== Research ==
Research indicates that although disability is associated with particular socially mediated stressors, there is no theoretical or empirical evidence to indicate that depression and its role in the right to die is dynamically different, more natural, or more reasonable for disabled people than for non-disabled people. Rational depression sometimes leads to rational suicide.
