= Beck's cognitive triad =

Three key elements of depression

A diagram showing Beck's cognitive triad

Beck's cognitive triad, also known as the negative triad, is a cognitive-therapeutic view of the three key elements of a person's belief system present in depression. It was proposed by Aaron Beck in 1967. The triad forms part of his cognitive theory of depression and the concept is used as part of CBT, particularly in Beck's "Treatment of Negative Automatic Thoughts" (TNAT) approach.

The triad involves "automatic, spontaneous and seemingly uncontrollable negative thoughts" about the self, the world or environment, and the future.

Examples of this negative thinking include:

- The self – "I'm worthless and ugly" or "I wish I was different"
- The world – "No one values me" or "people ignore me all the time"
- The future – "I'm hopeless because things will never change" or "things can only get worse!"

== Beck's cognitive model of depression ==
From a cognitive perspective, depressive disorders are characterized by people's dysfunctional negative views of themselves, their life experience (and the world in general), and their future—the cognitive triad.

People with depression often view themselves as unlovable, helpless, doomed or deficient. They tend to attribute their unpleasant experiences to their presumed physical, mental, and/or moral deficits. They tend to feel excessively guilty, believing that they are worthless, blameworthy, and rejected by self and others. They may have a very difficult time viewing themselves as people who could ever succeed, be accepted, or feel good about themselves and this may lead to withdrawal and isolation, which further worsens the mood.

=== Cognitive distortions ===
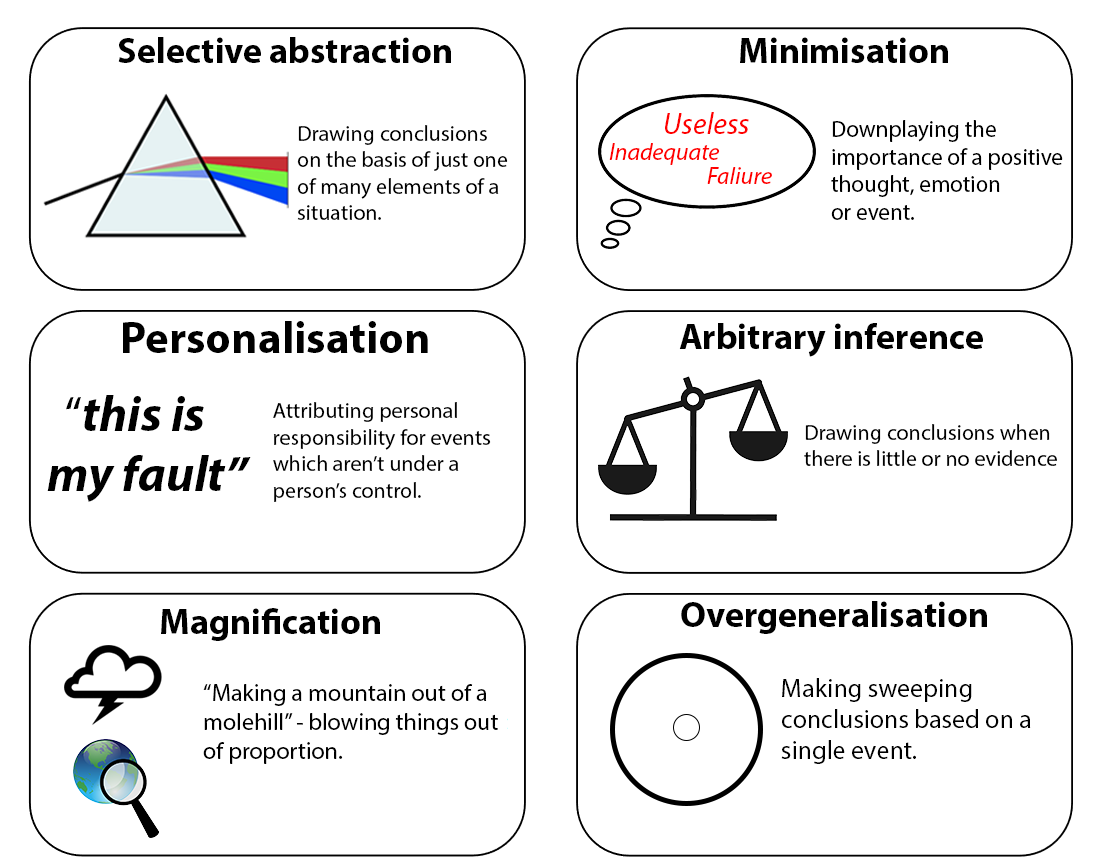
Examples of some of the cognitive biases used by depressed individuals, according to cognitive theories including Beck's cognitive model. People with depression may be taught how to identify and alter these biases as part of Cognitive Behavioural Therapy.

Beck proposes that those with depression develop cognitive distortions, a type of cognitive bias sometimes also referred to as faulty or unhelpful thinking patterns. Beck referred to some of these biases as "automatic thoughts", suggesting they are not entirely under conscious control. People with depression will tend to quickly overlook their positive attributes and disqualify their accomplishments as being minor or meaningless. They may also misinterpret the care, good will, and concern of others as being based on pity or susceptible to being lost easily if those others knew the “real person" and this fuels further feelings of guilt. The main cognitive distortions according to Beck are summarised below:

- Arbitrary inference - drawing conclusions from insufficient or no evidence.
- Selective abstraction - drawing conclusions on the basis of just one of many elements of a situation.
- Overgeneralisation - making sweeping conclusions based on a single event.
- Magnification - exaggerating the importance of an undesirable event.
- Minimisation - underplaying the significance of a positive event.
- Personalisation - attributing negative feelings of others to oneself.

Depressed people view their lives as devoid of pleasure or reward, presenting insuperable obstacles to achieving their important goals. This is often manifested as a lack of motivation and leads to the depressed person feeling further withdrawal and isolation as they may be seen as lazy by others. Everything seems and feels “too hard to manage” and other people are seen as punishing (or potentially so). They believe that their troubles will continue indefinitely, and that the future will only bring further hardship, deprivation, and frustration. “Paralysis of the will” results from the depressed patients' pessimism and hopelessness. Expecting their efforts to end in failure, they are reluctant to commit themselves to growth-oriented goals, and their activity level drops. Believing that they cannot affect the outcome of various situations, they experience a desire to avoid such situations.

Suicidal wishes are seen as an extreme expression of the desire to escape from problems that appear to be uncontrollable, interminable, and unbearable.

=== Negative self-schemata ===
Beck also believed that a depressed person will, often from childhood experiences, hold a negative self-schema. This schema may originate from negative early experiences, such as criticism, abuse or bullying. Beck suggests that people with negative self-schemata are liable to interpret information presented to them in a negative manner, leading to the cognitive distortions outlined above. The pessimistic explanatory style, which describes the way in which depressed or neurotic people react negatively to certain events, is an example of the effect of these schemata on self-image. This explanatory style involves blaming oneself for negative events outside of their control or the behaviour of others (personalisation), believing that such events will continue forever and letting these events significantly affect their emotional wellbeing.

== Measuring aspects of the triad ==
A number of instruments have been developed to attempt to measure negative cognition in the three areas of the triad. The Beck Depression Inventory (BDI) is a well-known questionnaire for scoring depression based on all three aspects of the triad. Other examples include the Beck Hopelessness Scale for measuring thoughts about the future and the Rosenberg Self-Esteem Scale for measuring views of the self. The Cognitive Triad Inventory (CTI) was developed by Beckham et al. to attempt to systematically measure the three aspects of Beck's triad. The CTI aims to quantify the relationship between "therapist behaviour in a single treatment session to changes in the cognitive triad" and "patterns of changes to the triad to changes in overall depressive mood". This inventory has since been adapted for use with children and adolescents in the CTI-C, developed by Kaslow et al.

== Biological correlates of the cognitive model ==
Although extensive research supports the cognitive model, there still remained the question of why only a proportion of people exposed to adverse stressors become depressed experiencing negative cognitive biases and pessimistic explanatory style. Many researchers believed there was "blue gene" responsible for impacting neural functioning affecting hyperactivity to negative experiences leading to depression. Technological advancements in the last few decades have indeed been able to verify these genetic variations and explain the structure of the relationship between adverse events, neurobiological disregulation and cognition.

=== Genetic vulnerability ===
Caspi et al. (2003) found that individuals possessing one or two copies of the short genetic variant of the serotonin transporter gene (5HTTLPR) were more prone to experiencing depression following exposure to an adverse life event. The findings of this study have then been replicated by researchers like Kendler et al. (2005) who showed children experiencing maltreatment and carried the 5HTTLPR gene displayed increased sensitivity to severe depression as adults, Vrshek-Schallhorn et al. (2014) who displayed the interaction between stressful life events and the 5HTTLPR gene predicted the onset of depression, Conway et al. (2012) who showed risk of depression as a result of 5HTTLPR gene increasing negative appraisals of adverse events etc. A meta-analysis done by Karg et al. (2011) confirms the moderating effects of the 5HTTLPR gene on perception of stressful events and depression. Additionally, the moderation by this genetic polymorphism seems to occur across a varied levels of stressors, ranging from mild to traumatic.

The relationship between 5HTTLPR and depression has also been found to be moderated by variants of the brain-derived neurotrophic factor gene, an important neuro-chemical for neural development. These variants are associated with structural and functional abnormalities in the hippocampus, including the HPA axis, which is consistent with findings of MDD patients experiencing symptoms of memory biases and increased stress. Other genes include variants of the FKBP5 gene, a modulator of glucocorticoid receptors, which help predict depression prognosis.

Criticisms of genetic vulnerability to depression include relatively small effect sizes in relation to heritability estimates and difficulty in replication of studies. Additionally, given the wide variation of genes that increase the risk of depression, there is no set consensus on which specific gene creates predispositions to the onset of depression, moreover, establishing depression risk as a heritable component. In fact, the Genome Wide Association has placed an emphasis for exploration on the mutual influence of environmental factors and genes on depression risk given that genetic risk is not necessary for onset of depression.

=== Genetic predispositions and cognition ===
Research has shown that short variant gene of 5HTTLPR is linked to negative recall, attentional and interpretive biases, all of which are known to contribute to negative evaluations of the self, world and future. For example, Hayden et al. (2014) showed that children possessing this gene carried out greater negative processing on a self-referential coding task (a measure of self-schema) following a negative mood induction (by watching sad videos) compared to children with different genotypes thus indicating the association of the gene with biases in information processing.

These biases have been explained by highlighting that the 5HTTLPR polymorphism increases the reactivity of the amygdala, the part of the brain which is responsible for our emotional processing including evaluation and storage of emotionally charged events. This heightened activity leads to increased attentional resources on adverse stressors manifesting a negative attentional bias and exaggerated reactions in mood. This selective focus hence ends up promoting cognitive distortions like overgeneralisation and consequently dysfunctional attitudes about the self, world and future.

=== Neurophysiology and cognition ===
The role of the amygdala is vital in understanding the onset of depression. Its function has been known to be influenced by serotonergic dysfunction (low levels of serotonin) which is primarily associated with the 5HTTLPR gene.

This gene polymorphism promotes hyperactivity of the amygdala through decreased pre-frontal cortex activity following the exposure to negative stimuli. The pre-frontal cortex (PFC) plays a key role in assessing stimuli, decision-making and inhibiting behaviour as a result of emotional processing of the amygdala. This means diminished cognitive control from the PFC and hyperactivity of the amygdala would result in increased emotional appraisal of events and failure to inhibit negatively biased cognitions. As a result, MDD patients perceive stimuli and base decisions about themselves, the world and the future through a negatively distorted emotional lens.

The disregulation of Hypothalamic-pituitary-adrenal axis has also been consistent in these findings. The hyperactivity of the amygdala can lead to excessive cortisol production which has known to solidify memory consolidation. Increased memory consolidation while experiencing an emotional stressor means increased attentional resources on the adverse memory which in turn contribute to negative schema formation about a particular event as well as prolong re-enforcement of negative beliefs.

== Re-imagined cognitive model of depression ==
Given the findings of biological and neurophysiological correlations to negative cognition, Beck draws a pragmatic relationship between the different levels to re-imagine and expand the cognitive model of depression.

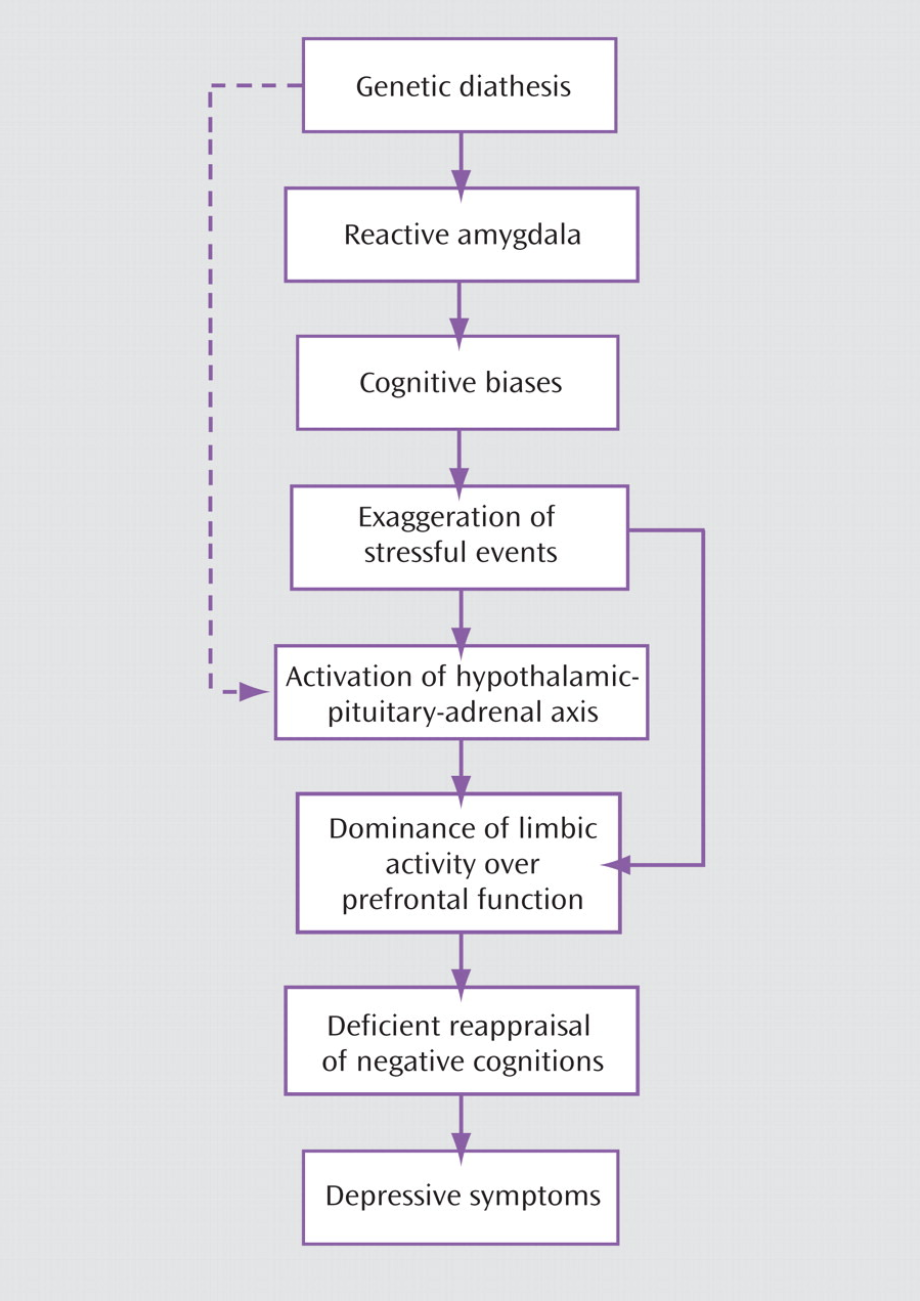
Expanded Cognitive Model based on genes

According to Beck, genetic diathesis, usually manifesting in the form of the short variant of the 5HTTLPR gene, leads to excessive reactivity of the amygdala and decreased PFC activity emphasising an increased focus on negative emotional reactivity and their deficient reappraisal. This triggers negative attentional biases formulating cognitive distortions like selective abstraction and magnification establishing negative cognitive perceptions. A collection of these perceptions form dysfunctional attitudes and beliefs about oneself, the world and the future in the form of negative schemas (framework of a collection of ideas). Repeated processing of events in this way strengthen the content of these schemas. The negative perceptions and interpretations also set off the HPA axis producing cortisol stimulating the consolidation of negative memories and emotions associated with the adverse stimuli. As a result, the cognitive triad is enabled and depressive symptoms manifest and persist.

=== Criticisms ===
An obvious criticism of this model is that it mainly focuses on the 5HTTLPR gene as the genetic diathesis whereas other genes have also been known to be associated with depressive symptoms. Additionally, most of the claims made in the theory are based on correlations. Moreover, one does not know whether it is decrease in serotonin or hyperactivity of the amygdala that directly causes depression. It is also unidentified how the 5HTTLPR gene causes the hyperactivity of the amygdala. A study also showed patients treated with cognitive therapy compared to those treated pharmaceutically did not show increase in cognitive depression symptoms when made to deplete their serotonin levels. This highlights an existing complex relationship between serotonin and cognition that requires further clarification.

== See also ==
- Pessimistic explanatory style
- Cognitive therapy
- Cognitive behavioral therapy
- Self-concept
- Cognitive bias
- Automatic negative thoughts
- Attentional bias
