= Richard Heimberg =

American psychologist

Richard Heimberg (born December 21, 1950) is a researcher, psychotherapist, and an emeritus professor of psychology at Temple University.

== Early life ==
Heimberg graduated magna cum laude from the University of Tennessee in 1972, earning a Bachelor of Science degree in psychology. He earned a Master of Science in 1974 and Doctor of Philosophy in 1977, both from Florida State University.

== Career ==
Cognitive behavior group therapy was founded on principles developed by Heimberg at the University of Albany's Centre for Stress and Anxiety Disorders. His focus lies on anxiety disorders, specifically social phobia (known as Social Anxiety Disorder following publication of the DSM-5). He has published more than 400 articles and books.

In 1983, he became the first researcher to receive National Institute of Mental Health (NIMH) funding to study psychosocial treatments for social phobia after the term first appeared in the third edition of the Diagnostic and Statistical Manual of Mental Disorders in 1980.

== See also ==
- Cognitive therapy
