= Mastery and pleasure technique =

Technique in behavioral therapy

The mastery and pleasure technique is a method of cognitive behavioral therapy for the treatment of depression. Aaron T. Beck described this technique first. The technique is useful when patients are active, but have no pleasure. The patients shall rate on a 5-point-scale (or a 10-point-scale) how much pleasure they have and how successful they are when they do something. The patients record this hourly.

- The patients shall learn "to recognize partial successes and small degrees of pleasure" because depressive patients tend to the cognitive distortion of all-or-nothing thinking.
- The patients can also learn that Mastery and Pleasure are independent. By the combination of rating mastery and pleasure unrealistic ideas like "Life should be all fun" or "The only thing worth spending time on is work to accomplish things." can be challenged.
- Lewinsohn has the theory that patients need reinforcers to feel good. The idea is that patients can get reinforcers from activities, but they "want to wait for their mood to lighten before engaging in activities." So Beck asks clients to perform activities as a behavioral experiment. The patients can then increase systematically the activities with higher ratings of mastery and pleasure and look for new activities.
