= Beck's triad =

Beck's Triad may refer to:

- Beck's triad (cardiology)
- Beck's cognitive triad
