= Journal of Cognitive Psychotherapy =

- Discipline: Psychotherapy
- Language: English
- Edited by: Eric A. Storch

Publication details
- Former names: Cognitive Behaviorist, British Journal of Cognitive Psychotherapy
- History: 1987–present
- Publisher: Springer Publishing
- Frequency: Quarterly

Standard abbreviations
- ISO 4: J. Cogn. Psychother.

Indexing
- ISSN: 0889-8391 (print); 1938-887X (web)

Links
- Journal homepage; Online access

The Journal of Cognitive Psychotherapy is a quarterly peer-reviewed academic journal covering cognitive behavioral therapy. It is published by Springer Publishing. It was formed by the merger of Cognitive Behaviorist and British Journal of Cognitive Psychotherapy.
