= Multimodal therapy =

Approach to psychotherapy that addresses seven dimensions of the patient

Multimodal therapy (MMT) is an approach to psychotherapy devised by psychologist Arnold Lazarus, who originated the term behavior therapy in psychotherapy. It is based on the idea that humans are biological beings that think, feel, act, sense, imagine, and interact—and that psychological treatment should address each of these modalities. Multimodal assessment and treatment follows seven reciprocally influential dimensions of personality (or modalities) known by their acronym BASIC I.D.: behavior, affect, sensation, imagery, cognition, interpersonal relationships, and drugs/biology.

Multimodal therapy is based on the idea that the therapist must address these multiple modalities of an individual to identify and treat a mental disorder. According to MMT, each individual is affected in different ways and in different amounts by each dimension of personality, and should be treated accordingly for treatment to be successful. It sees individuals as products of interplay among genetic endowment, physical environment, and social learning history. To state that learning plays a central role in the development and resolution of our emotional problems is to communicate little. For events to connect, they must occur simultaneously or in close succession. An association may exist when responses one stimulus provokes, are predictable and reliable, similar to those another provokes. In this regard, classical conditioning and operant conditioning are two central concepts in MMT.

== BASIC I.D. ==
BASIC I.D. refers to the seven dimensions of personality according to Lazarus. Creating a successful treatment for a specific individual requires that the therapist consider each dimension, and the individual's deficits in each.

- B represents behavior, which can be manifested through the use of inappropriate acts, habits, gestures, or the lack of appropriate behaviors.
- A stands for affect, which can be seen as the level of negative feelings or emotions one experiences.
- S is sensation, or the negative bodily sensations or physiological symptoms such as pain, tension, sweat, nausea, quick heartbeat, etc.
- I stands for imagery, which is the existence of negative cognitive images or mental pictures.
- C represents cognition or the degree of negative thoughts, attitudes, or beliefs.
- The second I stands for interpersonal relationships, and refers to one's ability to form successful relationships with others. It is based on social skills and support systems.
- D is for drugs and biological functions, and examines the individual's physical health, drug use, and other lifestyle choices.

Multimodal therapy addresses the fact that different people depend on or are more influenced by some personality dimensions more than others. Some people are prone to deal with their problems on their own, cognitively, while others are more likely to draw support from others, and others yet are likely to use physical activities to deal with problems, such as exercise or drugs. All reactions are a combination of how the seven dimensions work together in an individual. Once the source of the problem is found, treatment can be used to focus on that specific dimension more than the others.

== Function ==
MMT starts after the patient has been assessed based on his/her emotional responses, sensory displays and the manner in which he/she interacts with people around via behavior, affect, sensations, images, cognition, drugs and interpersonal activities. Based on this assessment, the therapist will introduce the patient to the first session. During this time, the therapist and the patient will create a list of problems and the suitable treatments that may suit him/her the most. Since the treatment is based upon individual cases, each remedial strategy is considered as an effective method for the patients.

Post the completion of the initial assessment, a more detailed diagnosis is done using questionnaires. The therapist shall diagnose both the actual profile as well as the structural profile of the patient. Such a diagnosis will define the target which both the therapist and the patient would want to achieve once the treatment is complete. Here, the therapist will evaluate different other ways to treat the patient. Often, relaxation tapes are used to calm down the patient. Besides psychotherapy, the therapist will try to include dietary measures and stress management programs to treat patient's associated psychiatric symptoms. The prime focus of the therapist would be to ease the pains of the patient and fulfill his/her needs by studying his/her behavior and mannerisms.

Upon the patient's prior consent, the therapist will tape all the sessions and furnish a copy of those tapes to the patient. These tapes act as a supporting resource when the therapist is evaluating the patient's behavior. MMT is a flexible mode of psychotherapy because each treatment plan is devised keeping all the possibilities in mind. In the case of a single patient, the duration of the session could last not more than few hours, depending upon the therapist's analysis of the concerned patient's behavior. However, if the patient shows a condition that needs multiple treatments, then the session could stretch farther so as to enable the therapist to analyse the patient further.

== CBT ==
Multimodal therapy originated with cognitive behavioral therapy (CBT), which is a fusion of cognitive therapy and behavior therapy. Behavior therapy focused on the consideration of external behaviors, while cognitive therapy focused on mental aspects and internal processes; combining the two made it possible to utilize both internal and external factors of treatment simultaneously.

Arnold Lazarus added the idea that, since personality is multi-dimensional, treatment must also consider multiple dimensions of personality to be effective. His idea of MMT involves examining symptoms on each dimension of personality in order to find the right combination of therapeutic techniques to address them all. Lazarus retained the basic premises of CBT, but believed that more of the individual's specific needs and personality dimensions must be considered.

== See also ==
- Common factors theory
- Integrative psychotherapy
