= Arbitrary inference =

Aspect of cognitive therapy

Arbitrary inference is a classic tenet of cognitive therapy created by Aaron T. Beck in 1979. He defines the act of making an arbitrary inference as the process of drawing a conclusion without sufficient evidence, or without any evidence at all. In cases of depression, Beck found that individuals may be more prone to cognitive distortions, and make arbitrary inferences more often. These inferences could be general and/or in reference to the effectiveness of their medicine or treatment. Arbitrary inference is one of numerous specific cognitive distortions identified by Beck that can be commonly presented in people with anxiety, depression, and psychological impairments.

Arbitrary inferences tend to derive from emotional disturbances one experienced and gave a distorted meaning. Most of the time that distorted meaning involves blaming the self.

== Beck ==
According to Beck (1967), a person goes through life with detrimental schemas and pessimistic point of view, they reinforce their harmful thoughts. People's prior beliefs also tend to reinforce that way of thinking, like when they focus on information that is in alignment with their belief and disregard equally relevant facts that do not align with their schemas. These schemas that dominate the cognitive processes consist of 1) Feeling inadequate and faulty, 2) Believing all actions and experiences will lead to failure, and 3) The future is discouraging. Over time, these thought processes become automatic. Without time to reflect on the cognitive process, one believes that their illogical reasoning to their conclusion is valid. Attributing the negative and distorted meaning of an event results in latent schemas that are later activated by events and influence how information from the event is processed. When a person creates an arbitrary inference it intervenes and is seen as effective response to the event.

Moreover, Beck has also studied the relationships between cognitive distortions and idiosyncrasies, where the inferences made could be based more on one's own personality rather than on a depressive state of emotions. This research shows that while common in those with depression, inferences can be made in any number of cases. The main issue covered, however, is how these can negatively affect someone's personal schema when coupled with the already negative emotions brought about by anxiety or depression.

Cognitive Therapy for Arbitrary Inference Aaron T. Becks approach to helping people with arbitrary inference is to ask them questions about the inference. Beck leads the people to think about the rationality of the automatic thoughts that happen when one is using arbitrary inference as an explanation to an event. By studying what people thought of themselves when they were depressed, Beck and his associates were able to develop this form of therapy to offer a change in self-opinion.

== Burns ==
In the book Feeling Good: The New Mood Therapy David D. Burns, a student of Aaron T. Beck, discusses in more detail the cognitive distortions. Burns explains arbitrary inference or "jumping to conclusions" with two of the most common examples of arbitrary inference: "Mind Reading" and "The Fortune Teller Error". When "Mind Reading" in arbitrary inference, one will believe others are thinking negatively about them. When "Mind Reading," one is so convinced others are thinking negatively about them, they do not even bother confirming. This acts as a self-fulfilling prophecy when the person avoids or counterattacks the other person, and as a result creating a tension that would not exist had they not applied the inference. In "The Fortune Teller Error" one would imagine something bad happening, and suddenly they are convinced it will happen, despite the irrationality of it. Similarly to "Mind Reading" it becomes a self-fulfilling prophecy.

== In other studies ==
Other scientists have also applied Beck's principle of arbitrary inference in studies on emotion in depressive patients. These studies showed that, in support of Beck's model on depression, arbitrary inferences were some the most common thoughts during the exercises. This lends to the necessity of cognitive therapy, especially for couples, so as to lessen some of these thoughts.

Some sources have also referenced this phenomenon in counseling, as one of the cognitive distortions proposed by Beck. Among others, arbitrary inference is one of the distortions that causes a person to misrepresent or misinterpret a scenario, which can especially cause problems among couples.

Beck's theories on depression, specifically about arbitrary inferences, have also been examined by researchers, to prove their validity or their usefulness. This research came before Beck officially published his theory of arbitrary inference in the 1970s, when his theory of cognitive therapy was still being argued. Researchers examined his theory, along with those of Bergin and Ullmann, to test their applicable nature to the subject of cognitive therapy. In doing so, Beck's thoughts were generally justified, with the research concluding that of the many distortions discussed in the studies, arbitrary inference was one of the commonly present distortions found in participants. Since then, Beck's theory has been widely used, more so than Ellis’ Technique of Irrational Beliefs, also called the ABC method or rational emotive behavior therapy.

In a 2003 study attempting to understand cognitive processes like arbitrary inference on depression, researchers compared 42 patients with chronic depression, 27 patients with major depressive disorder (non-chronic), and 24 patients that had never been psychiatrically ill before. The study included the Attributional Style Questionnaire, a ruminative response style questionnaire, the Schema Questionnaire, and the Dysfunctional Attitude Scale. While studies showed that both of the depressed groups were significantly elevated in every cognitive measure compared to the control group, the depressed group scored higher in the attributional style.

=== Cognitive bias modification ===
Studies done on CBM (Cognitive Bias Modification) have shown that changing the views one has on the world or on specific events can lead to a decrease in stress and an increase in confident performance. Lester and associates research methods on how to adequately cope with stress or even reduce its effects, and in the scope of Beck's research on inferences, they concluded that positive thinking and correct attributions can lead one to live a healthier lifestyle.

Moreover, different approaches have also been taken in cognitive therapy for these inferences, such as Cognitive Bias Modification (CBM). This involves modification of Beck's original theory on depression, coming up with positive views and feelings for situations, as opposed to negative ones. The point of the study was to show that simply thinking positively about something allows one to correctly attribute a situation, rather than ‘arbitrarily’ drawing false conclusions.

== Examples ==
One member of a married couple who does not receive a text back from his or her significant other promptly could conclude, "He or she must be cheating", or someone who has been feeling down on a rainy day could conclude, "I have seasonal depression".

In media, using an arbitrary inference is a common hyperbolic way to express oneself, especially when feeling more anxious or depressed. A person may receive requests to spend time with someone else, and in this state, they may assume it is because something is wanted, that they are going to be used. There is little to no evidence that this is the case, but the person infers that it is so, regardless.

== See also ==
- Jumping to conclusions
- Cognitive therapy
