= Low frustration tolerance =

Concept in Rational Emotive Behavioral Therapy

Low frustration tolerance (LFT) is a concept used to describe the inability to tolerate unpleasant feelings or stressful situations. It stems from the feeling that reality should be as wished, and that any frustration should be resolved quickly and easily. People with low frustration tolerance experience emotional disturbance when frustrations are not quickly resolved. Behaviors are then directed towards avoiding frustrating events which, paradoxically, leads to increased frustration and even greater mental stress.

LFT is used in Rational Emotive Behavioral Therapy

== Overview ==
Ellis alternatively described low frustration tolerance (LFT) as discomfort anxiety. He said it was the main irrational belief that young children probably develop. He said it could be helped by a form of exposure therapy (staying with the discomfort). Some REBT writers characterise LFT as "I can't stand it", arising from intolerance of discomfort, and resulting in effects such as procrastination and short-range hedonism. They contrast it with High Frustration Tolerance (HFT), characterised by accepting (although not necessarily liking) a situation and choosing to persevere in it.

== History ==
The concept was originally developed by psychologist Albert Ellis who theorized that low frustration tolerance is an evaluative component in dysfunctional and irrational beliefs. His theory of REBT proposes that irrational beliefs and the avoidance of stressful situations is the origin of behavioral and emotional problems. As humans, we tend to seek for instant gratification to avoid pain, ignoring the fact that evading a situation now, will make it more problematic later.

== Types of hedonism ==
- Inferential hedonism: People's desires are regarding their own hedonic states of pleasure and pain.
- Reinforcement Hedonism: The content of a person's desire, is reinforced because of the pleasure that imagining the specific desire brings.

== Stress ==
According to REBT, the way we perceive stressful situations plays a role in how we experience stress. Stress exists as part of the nervous system of humans, and it affects humans' well-being when the degree of stress exceeds their capacity of managing the situation either temporarily or permanently.

== Implications ==
LFT has been suggested as a main cause of procrastination. According to Dr. Sarah Edelman, LFT causes us to avoid difficult to endure situations and sometimes to avoid them altogether. This can be a problem because 'achieving many of the things that are important and worthwhile requires us to take actions that involve some discomfort.' Avoiding difficult situations and tasks can also prevent us from dealing constructively with problems, such as ending unpleasant relationships, improving unhealthy lifestyles, and moving on from dissatisfying jobs. Moreover, tasks perceived as boring, difficult or demanding of greater effort, are said to make a person more likely to procrastinate.

== Reducing LFT ==
In REBT, reducing irrational beliefs and increasing rational beliefs can reduce LFT. This cognitive restructuring allows a modification of dysfunctional thinking and acting, and allows people to change thoughts of great distress like:

- "Existing conditions must be changed to give me what I like, otherwise I can't stand it and I can't be happy at all!"
- "I must have immediate gratification and have to have it, or else I can't stand it and my life is awful"
- "I can't stand hassles"

Into more rational and less exaggerated thoughts like:

- "I don't like existing conditions"
- "I would like immediate gratification"
- "I find hassles and frustrations inconvenient"

== LFT Scale ==
The frustration discomfort scale (FDS), a multidimensional measure for LFT, was developed using REBT theories. These dimensions were labelled in four categories:

1. Emotional intolerance, involving intolerance of emotional distress.
2. Entitlement, involving intolerance of unfairness and frustrated gratification.
3. Discomfort intolerance, involving intolerance of difficulties and hassles.
4. Achievement, involving intolerance of frustrated achievement goals.

== Increasing tolerance ==
Ellis said the path to tolerance consisted of many roads, including unconditional self-acceptance, unconditional other-acceptance and unconditional life-acceptance.

== See also ==
- Frustration–aggression hypothesis
