= Rational emotive behavior therapy =

Psychotherapy

- MeSH: D011617

Rational emotive behavior therapy (REBT), previously called rational therapy and rational emotive therapy, is an active-directive, philosophically and empirically based psychotherapy, the aim of which is to resolve emotional and behavioral problems and disturbances and to help people to lead happier and more fulfilling lives.

REBT posits that people have erroneous beliefs about situations they are involved in, and that these beliefs cause disturbance, but can be disputed and changed.

== History ==
Rational emotive behavior therapy was created and developed by the American psychotherapist and psychologist Albert Ellis, who was inspired by many of the teachings of Asian, Greek, Roman and modern philosophers. REBT is a form of cognitive behavioral therapy (CBT) and was first expounded by Ellis in the mid-1950s; development continued until his death in 2007. Ellis became synonymous with the highly influential therapy. Psychology Today noted, "No individual—not even Freud himself—has had a greater impact on modern psychotherapy."

REBT is both a psychotherapeutic system of theory and practices and a school of thought established by Ellis. He first presented his ideas at a conference of the American Psychological Association in 1956 then published a seminal article in 1957 entitled "Rational psychotherapy and individual psychology", in which he set the foundation for what he was calling rational therapy (RT) and carefully responded to questions from Rudolf Dreikurs and others about the similarities and differences with Alfred Adler's individual psychology. This was around a decade before psychiatrist Aaron Beck first set forth his "cognitive therapy", after Ellis had contacted him in the mid-1960s. Ellis' own approach was renamed Rational Emotive Therapy in 1959, then the current term in 1992.

Precursors of certain fundamental aspects of rational emotive behavior therapy have been identified in ancient philosophical traditions, particularly to Stoics Marcus Aurelius, Epictetus, Zeno of Citium, Chrysippus, Panaetius of Rhodes, Cicero, and Seneca, and early Asian philosophers Confucius and Gautama Buddha. In his first major book on rational therapy, Ellis wrote that the central principle of his approach, that people are rarely emotionally affected by external events but rather by their thinking about such events, "was originally discovered and stated by the ancient Stoic philosophers." Ellis illustrates this with a quote from the Enchiridion of Epictetus: "Men are disturbed not by things, but by the views which they take of them." Ellis noted that Shakespeare expressed a similar thought in Hamlet: "There's nothing good or bad but thinking makes it so." Ellis also acknowledges early 20th century therapists, particularly Paul Charles Dubois, though he only read his work several years after developing his therapy.

== Theoretical assumptions ==
The REBT framework posits that humans have both innate rational (meaning self-helping, socially helping, and constructive) and irrational (meaning self-defeating, socially defeating, and unhelpful) tendencies and leanings. REBT claims that people to a large degree consciously and unconsciously construct emotional difficulties such as self-blame, self-pity, clinical anger, hurt, guilt, shame, depression and anxiety, and behavior tendencies like procrastination, compulsiveness, avoidance, addiction and withdrawal by the means of their irrational and self-defeating thinking, emoting and behaving.

REBT is then applied as an educational process in which the therapist often active-directively teaches the client how to identify irrational and self-defeating beliefs and philosophies which in nature are rigid, extreme, unrealistic, illogical and absolutist, and then to forcefully and actively question and dispute them and replace them with more rational and self-helping ones. By using different cognitive, emotive and behavioral methods and activities, the client, together with help from the therapist and in homework exercises, can gain a more rational, self-helping and constructive way of thinking, emoting and behaving.

One of the main objectives in REBT is to show the client that whenever unpleasant and unfortunate activating events occur in people's lives, they have a choice between making themselves feel healthily or, self-helpingly, sorry, disappointed, frustrated, and annoyed or making themselves feel unhealthily and self-defeatingly horrified, terrified, panicked, depressed, self-hating and self-pitying. By attaining and ingraining a more rational and self-constructive philosophy of themselves, others and the world, people often are more likely to behave and emote in more life-serving and adaptive ways.

A fundamental premise of REBT is that humans do not get emotionally disturbed by unfortunate circumstances, but by how they construct their views of these circumstances through their language, evaluative beliefs, meanings and philosophies about the world, themselves and others. This concept has been attributed as far back as the Stoic philosopher Epictetus, who is often cited as utilizing similar ideas in antiquity.

== A-B-C-D-E-F model ==
In REBT, clients usually learn and begin to apply this premise by learning the A-B-C-D-E-F model of psychological disturbance and change. The following letters represent the following meanings in this model:

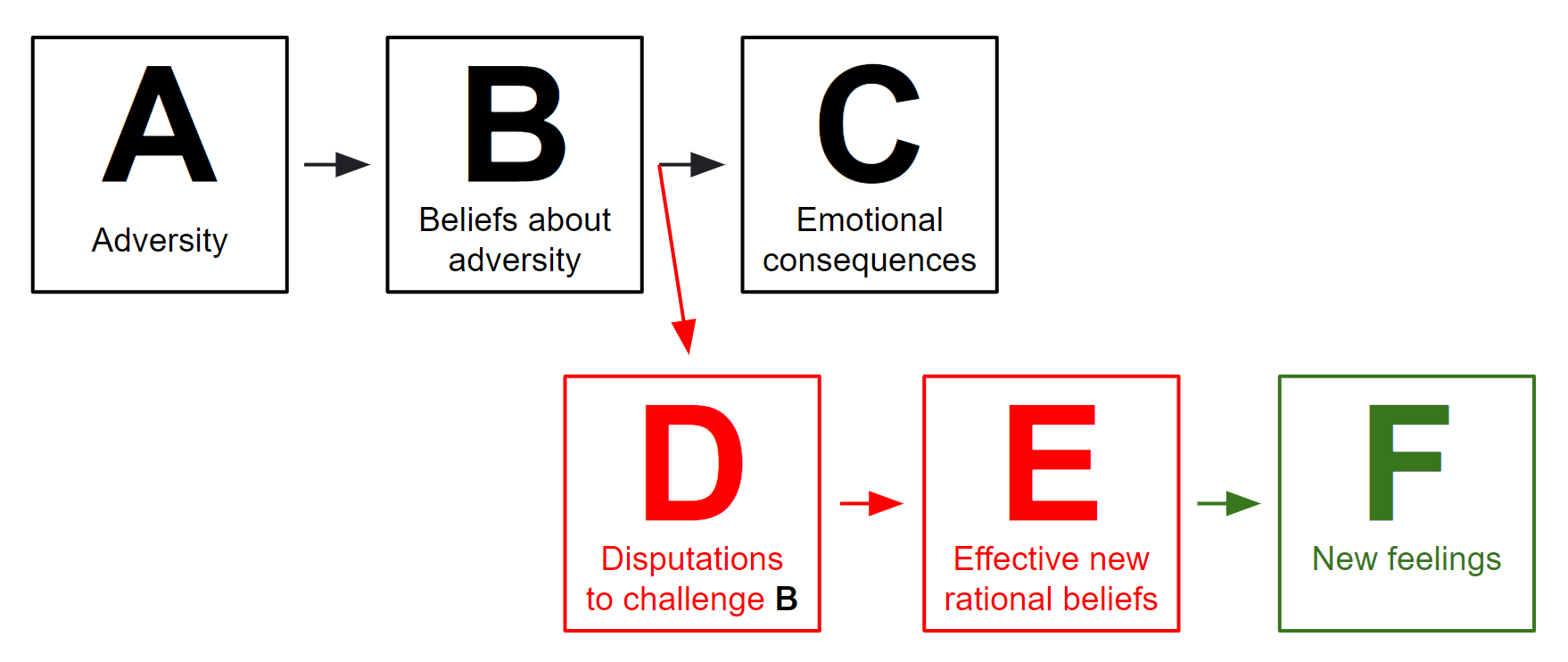

A Adversity
B Beliefs about adversity
C Emotional consequences
D Disputations to challenge beliefs about adversity
E Effective new rational beliefs
F New feelings

The A-B-C model states that it is not an A, adversity (or activating event) that cause disturbed and dysfunctional emotional and behavioral Cs, consequences, but also what people B, irrationally believe about the A, adversity. A, adversity can be an external situation, or a thought, a feeling or other kind of internal event, and it can refer to an event in the past, present, or future.

The Bs, irrational beliefs that are most important in the A-B-C model are the explicit and implicit philosophical meanings and assumptions about events, personal desires, and preferences. The Bs, beliefs that are most significant are highly evaluative and consist of interrelated and integrated cognitive, emotional and behavioral aspects and dimensions. According to REBT, if a person's evaluative B, belief about the A, activating event is rigid, absolutistic, fictional and dysfunctional, the C, the emotional and behavioral consequence, is likely to be self-defeating and destructive. Alternatively, if a person's belief is preferential, flexible, and constructive, the C, the emotional and behavioral consequence is likely to be self-helping and constructive.

Through REBT, by understanding the role of their mediating, evaluative and philosophically based illogical, unrealistic and self-defeating meanings, interpretations and assumptions in disturbance, individuals can learn to identify them, then go to D, disputing and questioning the evidence for them. At E, effective new philosophy, they can recognize and reinforce the notion no evidence exists for any psychopathological must, ought or should and distinguish them from healthy constructs, and subscribe to more constructive and self-helping philosophies. This new reasonable perspective leads to F, new feelings and behaviors appropriate to the A they are addressing in the exercise.

== Psychological dysfunction ==
One of the main pillars of REBT is that irrational and dysfunctional ways and patterns of thinking, feeling, and behaving are contributing to human disturbance and emotional and behavioral self-defeatism and social defeatism. REBT generally teaches that when people turn flexible preferences, desires and wishes into grandiose, absolutistic and fatalistic dictates, this tends to contribute to disturbance and upset. These dysfunctional patterns are examples of cognitive distortions.

=== Irrational beliefs ===
REBT proposes four core irrational ways of thinking that create suffering:

1. Demands: The tendency to demand success, fair treatment, and respect (e.g., I must be treated fairly).
2. Awfulizing: The tendency to consider adverse events as awful or terrible (e.g., It's awful when I am disrespected).
3. Low Frustration Tolerance (LFT): The belief that one could not stand or tolerate adversity (e.g., I cannot stand being treated unfairly).
4. Depreciation: The belief that one event reflects the person as a whole (e.g., When I fail it shows that I am a complete failure).

=== Core beliefs that disturb humans ===
Ellis has suggested that humans take the above distorted ways of thinking and created three core beliefs or philosophies that humans tend to disturb themselves through:

"I absolutely MUST, under practically all conditions and at all times, perform well (or outstandingly well) and win the approval (or complete love) of significant others. If I fail in these important—and sacred—respects, that is awful and I am a bad, incompetent, unworthy person, who will probably always fail and deserves to suffer."	"Other people with whom I relate or associate, absolutely MUST, under practically all conditions and at all times, treat me nicely, considerately and fairly. Otherwise, it is terrible and they are rotten, bad, unworthy people who will always treat me badly and do not deserve a good life and should be severely punished for acting so abominably to me."	"The conditions under which I live absolutely MUST, at practically all times, be favorable, safe, hassle-free, and quickly and easily enjoyable, and if they are not that way it's awful and horrible and I can't bear it. I can't ever enjoy myself at all. My life is impossible and hardly worth living."
Holding this belief when faced with adversity tends to contribute to feelings of anxiety, panic, depression, despair, and worthlessness.	Holding this belief when faced with adversity tends to contribute to feelings of anger, rage, fury, and vindictiveness.	Holding this belief when faced with adversity tends to contribute to frustration and discomfort, intolerance, self-pity, anger, depression, and to behaviors such as procrastination, avoidance, addictive behaviors and inaction.

=== Rigid demands that humans make ===
REBT commonly posits that at the core of irrational beliefs there often are explicit or implicit rigid demands and commands, and that extreme derivatives like awfulizing, low frustration tolerance, people deprecation and overgeneralizations are accompanied by these. According to REBT, the core dysfunctional philosophies in a person's evaluative emotional and behavioral belief system are also very likely to contribute to unrealistic, arbitrary and crooked inferences and distortions in thinking. REBT therefore first teaches that when people in an insensible and devout way overuse absolutistic, dogmatic and rigid "shoulds", "musts", and "oughts", they tend to disturb and upset themselves.

=== Over-generalization ===
Further, REBT generally posits that disturbed evaluations to a large degree occur through overgeneralization, wherein people exaggerate and globalize events or traits, usually unwanted events or traits or behavior, out of context, while almost always ignoring the positive events or traits or behaviors. For example, awfulizing is partly mental magnification of the importance of an unwanted situation to a catastrophe or horror, elevating the rating of something from bad to worse than it should be, to beyond totally bad, worse than bad to the intolerable and to a "holocaust". The same exaggeration and overgeneralizing occurs with human rating, wherein humans come to be arbitrarily and axiomatically defined by their perceived flaws or misdeeds.

=== Low frustration tolerance ===
Low frustration tolerance is the inability to tolerate unpleasant feelings or stressful situations.

=== Secondary disturbances ===
Essential to REBT theory is also the concept of secondary disturbances which people sometimes construct on top of their primary disturbance. As Ellis emphasizes:

Because of their self-consciousness and their ability to think about their thinking, they can very easily disturb themselves about their disturbances and can also disturb themselves about their ineffective attempts to overcome their emotional disturbances.

== Origins of dysfunction ==
Regarding cognitive-affective-behavioral processes in mental functioning and dysfunctioning, originator Albert Ellis explains:

REBT assumes that human thinking, emotion, and action are not really separate or disparate processes, but that they all significantly overlap and are rarely experienced in a pure state. Much of what we call emotion is nothing more nor less than a certain kind—a biased, prejudiced, or strongly evaluative kind—of thought. But emotions and behaviors significantly influence and affect thinking, just as thinking influences emotions and behaviors. Evaluating is a fundamental characteristic of human organisms and seems to work in a kind of closed circuit with a feedback mechanism: First, perception biases response, and then response tends to bias subsequent perception. Also, prior perceptions appear to bias subsequent perceptions, and prior responses appear to bias subsequent responses. What we call feelings almost always have a pronounced evaluating or appraisal element.

REBT then generally proposes that many of these self-defeating cognitive, emotive and behavioral tendencies are both innately biological and indoctrinated early in and during life, and further grow stronger as a person continually revisits, clings and acts on them. Ellis alludes to similarities between REBT and the general semantics when explaining the role of irrational beliefs in self-defeating tendencies, citing Alfred Korzybski as a significant modern influence on this thinking.

REBT differs from other clinical approaches like psychoanalysis in that it places little emphasis on exploring the past, but instead focuses on changing the current evaluations and philosophical thinking-emoting and behaving in relation to themselves, others and the conditions under which people live.

== Disturbances ==
REBT sees disturbances as caused by characteristics of a person, rather than a particular past event;

Almost all (neurotic clients) have innate tendencies to take their strong desires and preferences (which they learn and which they also have biological predispositions to construct) and to escalate them into unrealistic, illogical, absolutist demands and to thereby disturb themselves when these rigid imperatives are not fulfilled.

== Other insights ==
Other insights of REBT (some referring to the ABCDEF model above) are:

Insight 1 – People seeing and accepting the reality that their emotional disturbances at point C are only partially caused by the activating events or adversities at point A that precede C. Although A contributes to C, and although disturbed Cs (such as feelings of panic and depression) are much more likely to follow strong negative As (such as being assaulted or raped), than they are to follow weak As (such as being disliked by a stranger), the main or more direct cores of extreme and dysfunctional emotional disturbances (Cs) are people's irrational beliefs—the "absolutistic" (inflexible) "musts" and their accompanying inferences and attributions that people strongly believe about the activating event.

Insight 2 – No matter how, when, and why people acquire self-defeating or irrational beliefs (i.e. beliefs that are the main cause of their dysfunctional emotional-behavioral consequences), if they are disturbed in the present, they tend to keep holding these irrational beliefs and continue upsetting themselves with these thoughts. They do so not because they held them in the past, but because they still actively hold them in the present (often unconsciously), while continuing to reaffirm their beliefs and act as if they are still valid. In their minds and hearts, the troubled people still follow the core "masturbatory" philosophies they adopted or invented long ago or ones they recently accepted or constructed.

Insight 3 – No matter how well they have gained insights 1 and 2, insight alone rarely enables people to undo their emotional disturbances. They may feel better when they know, or think they know, how they became disturbed, because insights can feel useful and curative. But it is unlikely that people will actually get better and stay better unless they have and apply insight 3, which is that there is usually no way to get better and stay better except by continual work and practice in looking for and finding one's core irrational beliefs; actively, energetically, and scientifically disputing them; replacing one's absolute "musts" (rigid requirements about how things should be) with more flexible preferences; changing one's unhealthy feelings to healthy, self-helping emotions; and firmly acting against one's dysfunctional fears and compulsions. Only by a combined cognitive, emotive, and behavioral, as well as a quite persistent and forceful attack on one's serious emotional problems, is one likely to significantly ameliorate or remove them, and keep them removed.

== Intervention ==
As explained, REBT is a therapeutic system of both theory and practice; generally one of the goals of REBT is to help clients see the ways in which they have learned how they often needlessly upset themselves, teach them how to "un-upset" themselves and then how to empower themselves to lead happier and more fulfilling lives. The emphasis in therapy is generally to establish a successful collaborative therapeutic working alliance based on the REBT educational model. Although REBT teaches that the therapist or counsellor is better served by demonstrating unconditional other-acceptance or unconditional positive regard, the therapist is not necessarily always encouraged to build a warm and caring relationship with the client. The tasks of the therapist or counselor include understanding the client's concerns from his point of reference and work as a facilitator, teacher and encourager.

In traditional REBT, the client together with the therapist, in a structured active-directive manner, often work through a set of target problems and establish a set of therapeutic goals. In these target problems, situational dysfunctional emotions, behaviors and beliefs are assessed in regards to the client's values and goals. After working through these problems, the client learns to generalize insights to other relevant situations. In many cases after going through a client's different target problems, the therapist is interested in examining possible core beliefs and more deep rooted philosophical evaluations and schemas that might account for a wider array of problematic emotions and behaviors. Although REBT much of the time is used as a brief therapy, in deeper and more complex problems, longer therapy is promoted.

In therapy, the first step often is that the client acknowledges the problems, accepts emotional responsibility for these and has willingness and determination to change. This normally requires a considerable amount of insight, but as originator Albert Ellis explains:

Humans, unlike just about all the other animals on earth, create fairly sophisticated languages which not only enable them to think about their feeling, their actions, and the results they get from doing and not doing certain things, but they also are able to think about their thinking and even think about thinking about their thinking.

Through the therapeutic process, REBT employs a wide array of forceful and active, meaning multimodal and disputing, methodologies. Central through these methods and techniques is the intent to help the client challenge, dispute and question their destructive and self-defeating cognitions, emotions and behaviors. The methods and techniques incorporate cognitive-philosophic, emotive-evocative-dramatic, and behavioral methods for disputation of the client's irrational and self-defeating constructs and helps the client come up with more rational and self-constructive ones. REBT seeks to acknowledge that understanding and insight are not enough; in order for clients to significantly change, they need to pinpoint their irrational and self-defeating constructs and work forcefully and actively at changing them to more functional and self-helping ones.

REBT posits that the client must work hard to get better, and in therapy this normally includes a wide array of homework exercises in day-to-day life assigned by the therapist. The assignments may for example include desensitization tasks, i.e., by having the client confront the very thing he or she is afraid of. By doing so, the client is actively acting against the belief that often is contributing significantly to the disturbance.

Another factor contributing to the brevity of REBT is that the therapist seeks to empower the client to help himself through future adversities. REBT only promotes temporary solutions if more fundamental solutions are not found. An ideal successful collaboration between the REBT therapist and a client results in changes to the client's philosophical way of evaluating himself or herself, others, and his or her life, which will likely yield effective results. The client then moves toward unconditional self-acceptance, other-acceptance and life-acceptance while striving to live a more self-fulfilling and happier life.

== Applications and interfaces ==
Applications and interfaces of REBT are used with a broad range of clinical problems in traditional psychotherapeutic settings such as individual-, group- and family therapy. It is used as a general treatment for a vast number of different conditions and psychological problems normally associated with psychotherapy.

In addition, REBT is used with non-clinical problems and problems of living through counselling, consultation and coaching settings dealing with problems including relationships, social skills, career changes, stress management, assertiveness training, grief, problems with aging, money, weight control etc. More recently, the reported use of REBT in sport and exercise settings has grown, with the efficacy of REBT demonstrated across a range of sports.

REBT also has many interfaces and applications through self-help resources, phone and internet counseling, workshops & seminars, workplace and educational programmes, etc. This includes Rational Emotive Education (REE) where REBT is applied in education settings, Rational Effectiveness Training in business and work-settings and SMART Recovery (Self Management And Recovery Training) in supporting those in addiction recovery, in addition to a wide variety of specialized treatment strategies and applications.

== Efficacy ==
REBT and CBT in general have a strong and substantial research base to verify and support their psychotherapeutic efficiency and their theoretical underpinnings. Meta-analyses of outcome-based studies reveal REBT to be effective for treating various psychopathologies, conditions and problems. Recently, REBT randomized clinical trials have offered a positive view on the efficacy of REBT.

REBT has a strong and a substantial body of modern psychological research have validated and substantiated many of REBTs theoretical assumptions on personality and psychotherapy.

REBT may be effective in improving sports performance and mental health.

Ellis himself later in life accepted that REBT was not universally effective; "I hope I am also not a devout REBTer, since I do not think it is an unmitigated cure for everyone and do accept its distinct limitations."

== Limitations and critique ==
The clinical research on REBT has been criticized by both supporters and detractors. For instance, originator Albert Ellis has on occasion emphasized the difficulty and complexity of measuring psychotherapeutic effectiveness, because many studies only tend to measure whether clients merely feel better after therapy instead of them getting better and staying better. Ellis has also criticized studies for having limited focus primarily to cognitive restructuring aspects, as opposed to the combination of cognitive, emotive and behavioral aspects of REBT. As REBT has been subject to criticisms during its existence, especially in its early years, REBT theorists have a long history of publishing and addressing those concerns. It has also been argued by Ellis and by other clinicians that REBT theory on numerous occasions has been misunderstood and misconstrued both in research and in general.

Some have criticized REBT for being harsh, formulaic and failing to address deep underlying problems. REBT theorists have argued in reply that a careful study of REBT shows that it is both philosophically deep, humanistic and individualized collaboratively working on the basis of the client's point of reference. They have further argued that REBT utilizes an integrated and interrelated methodology of cognitive, emotive-experiential and behavioral interventions. Others have questioned REBTs view of rationality, both radical constructivists who have claimed that reason and logic are subjective properties and those who believe that reason can be objectively determined. REBT theorists have argued in reply that REBT raises objections to clients' irrational choices and conclusions as a working hypothesis and through collaborative efforts demonstrate the irrationality on practical, functional and social consensual grounds. In 1998 when asked what the main criticism on REBT was, Albert Ellis replied that it was the claim that it was too rational and not dealing sufficiently enough with emotions. He repudiated the claim by saying that REBT on the contrary emphasizes that thinking, feeling, and behaving are interrelated and integrated, and that it includes a vast amount of both emotional and behavioural methods in addition to cognitive ones.

Ellis has himself in very direct terms criticized opposing approaches such as psychoanalysis, transpersonal psychology and abreactive psychotherapies in addition to on several occasions questioning some of the doctrines in certain religious systems, spiritualism and mysticism. Many, including REBT practitioners, have warned against dogmatizing and sanctifying REBT as a supposedly perfect psychological panacea. Prominent REBTers have promoted the importance of high quality and programmatic research, including originator Ellis, a self-proclaimed "passionate skeptic". He has on many occasions been open to challenges and acknowledged errors and inefficiencies in his approach and concurrently revised his theories and practices. In general, with regard to cognitive-behavioral psychotherapies' interventions, others have pointed out that as about 30–40% of people are still unresponsive to interventions, that REBT could be a platform of reinvigorating empirical studies on the effectiveness of the cognitive-behavioral models of psychopathology and human functioning.

REBT has been developed, revised and augmented through the years as understanding and knowledge of psychology and psychotherapy have progressed. This includes its theoretical concepts, practices and methodology. The teaching of scientific thinking, reasonableness and un-dogmatism has been inherent in REBT as an approach, and these ways of thinking are an inextricable part of REBT's empirical and skeptical nature.

I hope I am also not a devout REBTer, since I do not think it is an unmitigated cure for everyone and do accept its distinct limitations.

— Albert Ellis

== Mental wellness ==
As would be expected, REBT argues that mental wellness and mental health to a large degree results from an adequate amount of self-helping, flexible, logico-empirical ways of thinking, emoting and behaving. When a perceived undesired and stressful activating event occurs, and the individual is interpreting, evaluating and reacting to the situation rationally and self-helpingly, then the resulting consequence is, according to REBT, likely to be more healthy, constructive and functional. This does not by any means mean that a relatively un-disturbed person never experiences negative feelings, but REBT does hope to keep debilitating and un-healthy emotions and subsequent self-defeating behavior to a minimum. To do this, REBT generally promotes a flexible, un-dogmatic, self-helping and efficient belief system and constructive life philosophy about adversities and human desires and preferences.

REBT clearly acknowledges that people, in addition to disturbing themselves, also are innately constructivists. Because they largely upset themselves with their beliefs, emotions and behaviors, they can be helped to, in a multimodal manner, dispute and question these and develop a more workable, more self-helping set of constructs.

REBT generally teaches and promotes:

- That the concepts and philosophies of life of unconditional self-acceptance, other-acceptance, and life-acceptance are effective philosophies of life in achieving mental wellness and mental health.
- That human beings are inherently fallible and imperfect and that they are better served by accepting their and other human beings' totality and humanity, while at the same time they may not like some of their behaviors and characteristics. That they are better off not measuring their entire self or their "being" and give up the narrow, grandiose and ultimately destructive notion to give themselves any global rating or report card. This is partly because all humans are continually evolving and are far too complex to accurately rate; all humans do both self-defeating / socially defeating and self-helping/socially helping deeds, and have both beneficial and un-beneficial attributes and traits at certain times and in certain conditions. REBT holds that ideas and feelings about self-worth are largely definitional and are not empirically confirmable or falsifiable.
- That people had better accept life with its hassles and difficulties not always in accordance with their wants, while trying to change what they can change and live as elegantly as possible with what they cannot change.
