= Cognitive behavioral therapy =

Type of therapy to improve mental health

- The triangle in the middle represents CBT's tenet that all humans' core beliefs can be summed up in three categories: self, others, future.
- ICD-10-PCS: GZ58ZZZ
- MeSH: D015928

Cognitive behavioral therapy (CBT) is a form of psychotherapy that combines basic principles from cognitive psychology and behaviorism. It aims to reduce symptoms of various mental health conditions by challenging and adjusting convictions and assumptions, while helping patients learn better-adapted behavior by trying and training new behaviours. While CBT has philosophical precursors in Stoicism, it developed in three waves in the 20th century.

The first wave consisted of the development of behaviorism in the 1920s and behavioral therapy in the 1950s and 1960s. The second wave focused on the importance of cognitions in the therapeutic process, resulting in the development of cognitive therapy by psychoanalyst Aaron Beck in the 1950s and the establishment of classical CBT, when cognitive and behavioral approaches were combined. The third wave took place in the 1980s and 1990s, when principles originating from Buddhism, especially mindfulness and acceptance, significantly contributed to the development of various new forms of CBT. Over time, cognitive behavior therapy became an umbrella term for all cognitive-based psychotherapies.

CBT is a "problem-focused" and "action-oriented" form of therapy. The therapist's role is to assist the client in finding and practicing effective cognitive and behavioral strategies to address identified obstacles and alleviate symptoms of the disorder. CBT is based on the belief that thought distortions and maladaptive behaviors play a role in the development and maintenance of many psychological disorders. CBT focuses on challenging and changing these cognitive distortions (thoughts, beliefs, and attitudes) and their associated behaviors to improve emotional regulation and help the individual develop coping strategies to address problems.

CBT includes a number of cognitive and behavioral psychotherapies that treat defined psychopathologies using evidence-based techniques and strategies. These therapies include, but are not limited to, rational emotive behavior therapy (REBT), cognitive therapy, metacognitive therapy, metacognitive training, reality therapy/choice theory, cognitive processing therapy, eye movement desensitization and reprocessing (EMDR), and multimodal therapy. New forms of CBT specifically influenced by mindfulness approaches include dialectical behavior therapy, mindfulness-based cognitive therapy, acceptance and commitment therapy, and compassion-focused therapy.

Though originally designed to treat depression, CBT is often prescribed as an evidence-informed treatment for many mental health and medical conditions. These include obsessive–compulsive disorder, generalized anxiety disorder, substance use disorders, marital problems, attention deficit hyperactivity disorder, and eating disorders. Along with interpersonal psychotherapy (IPT), CBT is recommended in treatment guidelines as a psychosocial treatment of choice. It is recommended by the American Psychiatric Association, the American Psychological Association, and the British National Health Service. CBT is also recommended as the first line of treatment for the majority of psychological disorders in children and adolescents, including aggression and conduct disorder.

Criticism of the therapy has focused on its lack of double-blind tested research, relatively high drop-out rates, and tendency to target symptoms rather than the underlying condition.

== History ==
The modern roots of CBT can be traced to the development of behavior therapy in the early 20th century, the development of cognitive therapy in the late 1950s to early 1960s, and the subsequent merging of the two.

=== Philosophical precursors ===
Precursors of certain fundamental aspects of CBT have been identified in various ancient philosophical traditions, particularly Stoicism. Aaron T. Beck's original treatment manual for depression states, "The philosophical origins of cognitive therapy can be traced back to the Stoic philosophers". Another example of Stoic influence on cognitive theorists is the influence of Epictetus on Albert Ellis. A key philosophical figure who influenced the development of CBT was John Stuart Mill through his creation of Associationism, a predecessor of classical conditioning and behavioral theory.

=== First wave: behavioral therapy ===
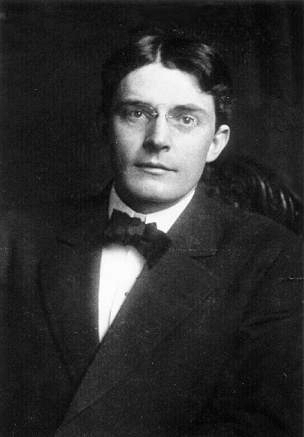
John B. Watson

Groundbreaking work in behaviorism began with John B. Watson and Rosalie Rayner's studies of conditioning in 1920. Behaviorally-centered therapeutic approaches appeared as early as 1924 with Mary Cover Jones' work dedicated to the unlearning of fears in children. These were the antecedents of the development of Joseph Wolpe's behavioral therapy in the 1950s. It was the work of Wolpe and Watson, which was based on Ivan Pavlov's work on learning and conditioning, that influenced Hans Eysenck and Arnold Lazarus to develop new behavioral therapy techniques based on classical conditioning.

During the 1950s and 1960s, behavioral therapy became widely used by researchers in the United States, the United Kingdom, and South Africa. Their inspiration was by the behaviorist learning theory of Ivan Pavlov, John B. Watson, and Clark L. Hull.

In Britain, Joseph Wolpe, who applied the findings of animal experiments to his method of systematic desensitization, applied behavioral research to the treatment of neurotic disorders. Wolpe's therapeutic efforts were precursors to today's fear reduction techniques. British psychologist Hans Eysenck presented behavior therapy as a constructive alternative.

At the same time as Eysenck's work, B. F. Skinner and his associates were beginning to have an impact with their work on operant conditioning. Skinner's work was referred to as radical behaviorism and avoided anything related to cognition. However, Julian Rotter in 1954 and Albert Bandura in 1969 contributed to behavior therapy with their works on social learning theory by demonstrating the effects of cognition on learning and behavior modification. The work of Claire Weekes in dealing with anxiety disorders in the 1960s is also seen as a prototype of behavior therapy.

The emphasis on behavioral factors has been described as the "first wave" of CBT.

=== Second wave: cognitive therapy and classical CBT ===
One of the first therapists to address cognition in psychotherapy was Alfred Adler, notably with his idea of basic mistakes and how they contributed to creation of unhealthy behavioral and life goals.Abraham Low believed that someone's thoughts were best changed by changing their actions. Adler and Low influenced the work of Albert Ellis, who developed the earliest cognitive-based psychotherapy called rational emotive behavioral therapy, or REBT. The first version of REBT was announced to the public in 1956.

Cognitive therapy was developed by psychoanalyst Aaron Beck in the 1950s. In the late 1950s, Aaron Beck was conducting free association sessions in his psychoanalytic practice. During these sessions, Beck noticed that thoughts were not as unconscious as Freud had previously theorized, and that certain types of thinking may be the culprits of emotional distress. It was from this hypothesis that Beck developed cognitive therapy, and called these thoughts "automatic thoughts". He first published his new methodology in 1967, and his first treatment manual in 1979. Beck has been referred to as "the father of cognitive behavioral therapy".

It was these two therapies, rational emotive therapy, and cognitive therapy, that started the "second wave" of CBT, which emphasized cognitive factors and developed into classical CBT in the 1970s.

Although the early behavioral approaches were successful in many so-called neurotic disorders, they had little success in treating depression. Behaviorism was also losing popularity due to the cognitive revolution. The therapeutic approaches of Albert Ellis and Aaron T. Beck gained popularity among behavior therapists, despite the earlier behaviorist rejection of mentalistic concepts like thoughts and cognitions. Both of these systems included behavioral elements and interventions, with the primary focus being on problems in the present.

=== Third wave: mindfulness-oriented CBT ===
A change of orienting assumptions constituted the "third wave" of CBT, in which the focus shifted from the content of one's cognitions to one's stance toward one's cognitions. Principles originating from Buddhism, especially mindfulness and acceptance, have significantly impacted the evolution of various new forms of CBT, including dialectical behavior therapy, mindfulness-based cognitive therapy, acceptance and commitment therapy, and compassion-focused therapy.

Over time, cognitive behavior therapy came to be known not only as a therapy, but as an umbrella term for all cognitive-based psychotherapies. These therapies include, but are not limited to, REBT, cognitive therapy, acceptance and commitment therapy, dialectical behavior therapy, metacognitive therapy, metacognitive training, reality therapy/choice theory, cognitive processing therapy, EMDR, and multimodal therapy.

Despite the increasing popularity of third-wave treatment approaches, reviews of studies reveal there may be no difference in the effectiveness compared with non-third wave CBT for the treatment of depression.

== Guiding principles ==
Mainstream cognitive behavioral therapy assumes that changing maladaptive thinking leads to change in behavior and affect, but recent variants emphasize changes in one's relationship to maladaptive thinking rather than changes in thinking itself.

=== Basic assumptions ===
==== Cognitive therapy ====
Chaloult, Ngo, Cousineau and Goulet have attempted to identify the main assumptions of cognitive therapy used in CBT based on the research literature (Beck; Walen and Wessler; Beck, Emery and Greenberg, and Auger). They describe fourteen assumptions:

1. Human emotions are primarily caused by people's thoughts and perceptions rather than events.
2. Events, thoughts, emotions, behaviors, and physiological reactions influence each other.
3. Dysfunctional emotions are typically caused by unrealistic thoughts. Reducing dysfunctional emotions requires becoming aware of irrational thoughts and changing them.
4. Human beings have an innate tendency to develop irrational thoughts. This tendency is reinforced by their environment.
5. People are largely responsible for their own dysfunctional emotions, as they maintain and reinforce their own beliefs.
6. Sustained effort is necessary to modify dysfunctional thoughts, emotions, and behaviors.
7. Rational thinking usually causes a decrease in the frequency, intensity, and duration of dysfunctional emotions, rather than an absence of affect or feelings.
8. A positive therapeutic relationship is essential to successful cognitive therapy.
9. Cognitive therapy is based on a teacher-student relationship, where the therapist educates the client.
10. Cognitive therapy uses Socratic questioning to challenge cognitive distortions.
11. Homework is an essential aspect of cognitive therapy. It consolidates the skills learned in therapy.
12. The cognitive approach is active, directed, and structured.
13. Cognitive therapy is generally short.
14. Cognitive therapy is based on predictable steps.

These steps largely involve learning about the CBT model; making links between thoughts, emotions, behaviors, and physiological reactions; noticing when dysfunctional emotions occur; learning to question the thoughts associated with these emotions; replacing irrational thoughts with others more grounded in reality; modifying behaviors based on new interpretations of events; and, in some cases, learning to recognize and change the major beliefs and attitudes underlying cognitive distortions.

Therapists use CBT techniques to help people challenge their patterns and beliefs and replace errors in thinking, known as cognitive distortions with "more realistic and effective thoughts, thus decreasing emotional distress and self-defeating behavior". Cognitive distortions can be either a pseudo-discrimination belief or an overgeneralization of something. CBT techniques may also be used to help individuals take a more open, mindful, and aware posture toward cognitive distortions so as to diminish their impact.

Mainstream CBT helps individuals replace "maladaptive... coping skills, cognitions, emotions and behaviors with more adaptive ones", by challenging an individual's way of thinking and the way that they react to certain habits or behaviors, but there is still controversy about the degree to which these traditional cognitive elements account for the effects seen with CBT over and above the earlier behavioral elements such as exposure and skills training.

==== Behavioral therapy ====
Chaloult, Ngo, Cousineau and Goulet have also described the assumptions of behavioral therapy as used in CBT. They refer to the work of Agras, Prochaska and Norcross, and Kirk. The assumptions are:

1. Behaviors play an essential role in the onset, perpetuation and exacerbation of psychopathology.
2. Learning theory is key in understanding the treatment of mental illness, as behaviors can be learned and unlearned.
3. A rigorous evaluation (applied behavior analysis) is essential at the start of treatment. It includes identifying behaviors; precipitating, moderating, and perpetuating factors; the consequences of the behaviors; avoidance, and personal resources.
4. The effectiveness of the treatment is monitored throughout its duration.
5. Behavior therapy is scientific and the different forms of treatment are evaluated with rigorous evidence.
6. Behavior therapy is active, directed, and structured.

=== Phases in therapy ===
CBT can be seen as having six phases:

1. Assessment or psychological assessment;
2. Reconceptualization;
3. Skills acquisition;
4. Skills consolidation and application training;
5. Generalization and maintenance;
6. Post-treatment assessment follow-up.

These steps are based on a system created by Kanfer and Saslow. After identifying the behaviors that need changing, whether they be in excess or deficit, and treatment has occurred, the psychologist must identify whether or not the intervention succeeded. For example, "If the goal was to decrease the behavior, then there should be a decrease relative to the baseline. If the critical behavior remains at or above the baseline, then the intervention has failed."

The steps in the assessment phase include:

1. Identify critical behaviors;
2. Determine whether critical behaviors are excesses or deficits;
3. Evaluate critical behaviors for frequency, duration, or intensity (obtain a baseline);
4. If excess, attempt to decrease frequency, duration, or intensity of behaviors; if deficits, attempt to increase behaviors.

The re-conceptualization phase makes up much of the "cognitive" portion of CBT.

=== Combination with related techniques ===
CBT may be delivered in conjunction with a variety of diverse but related techniques such as exposure therapy, stress inoculation, cognitive processing therapy, cognitive therapy, metacognitive therapy, metacognitive training, relaxation training, dialectical behavior therapy, and acceptance and commitment therapy. Some practitioners promote a form of mindful cognitive therapy which includes a greater emphasis on self-awareness as part of the therapeutic process.

=== Age-adjustment ===
CBT is used to help people of all ages, but the therapy should be adjusted based on the age of the patient with whom the therapist is dealing. Older individuals in particular have certain characteristics that need to be acknowledged and the therapy altered to account for these differences thanks to age. Of the small number of studies examining CBT for the management of depression in older people, there is currently no strong support.

== Modes of administering ==
There are different protocols for providing cognitive behavioral therapy, with important similarities among them. Use of the term CBT may refer to different interventions, including "self-instructions (e.g. distraction, imagery, motivational self-talk), relaxation and/or biofeedback, development of adaptive coping strategies (e.g. minimizing negative or self-defeating thoughts), changing maladaptive beliefs about pain, and goal setting". Treatment is sometimes manualized, with brief, direct, and time-limited treatments for individual psychological disorders that are specific technique-driven. CBT is used in both individual and group settings, and the techniques are often adapted for self-help applications. Some clinicians and researchers are cognitively oriented (e.g. cognitive restructuring), while others are more behaviorally oriented (e.g. in vivo exposure therapy). Interventions such as imaginal exposure therapy combine both approaches.

=== Face-to-face sessions ===
A typical CBT program would consist of face-to-face sessions between patient and therapist, made up of 6–18 sessions of around an hour each with a gap of 1–3 weeks between sessions. This initial program might be followed by some booster sessions, for instance after one month and three months. CBT has also been found to be effective if patient and therapist type in real time to each other over computer links.

Cognitive-behavioral therapy is most closely allied with the scientist–practitioner model in which clinical practice and research are informed by a scientific perspective, clear operationalization of the problem, and an emphasis on measurement, including measuring changes in cognition and behavior and the attainment of goals.

=== Homework assignments ===
Desired outcomes are often met through "homework" assignments in which the patient and the therapist work together to craft an assignment to complete before the next session. The completion of these assignments – which can be as simple as a person with depression attending some kind of social event – indicates a dedication to treatment compliance and a desire to change. The therapists can then logically gauge the next step of treatment based on how thoroughly the patient completes the assignment. Effective cognitive behavioral therapy is dependent on a therapeutic alliance between the healthcare practitioner and the person seeking assistance.

Unlike many other forms of psychotherapy, the patient is very involved in CBT. For example, an anxious patient may be asked to talk to a stranger as a homework assignment, but if that is too difficult, he or she can work out an easier assignment first. The therapist needs to be flexible and willing to listen to the patient rather than acting as an authority figure.

=== Group educational course ===
Patient participation in group courses has been shown to be effective. In a meta-analysis reviewing evidence-based treatment of OCD in children, individual CBT was found to be more efficacious than group CBT.

=== Reading self-help materials ===
Enabling patients to read self-help CBT guides has been shown to be effective by some studies. However one study found a negative effect in patients who tended to ruminate, and another meta-analysis found that the benefit was only significant when the self-help was guided (e.g. by a medical professional).

=== Computerized or Internet-delivered (CCBT) ===
Computerized cognitive behavioral therapy (CCBT) has been described by NICE as a "generic term for delivering CBT via an interactive computer interface delivered by a personal computer, internet, or interactive voice response system", instead of face-to-face with a human therapist. It is also known as internet-delivered cognitive behavioral therapy or ICBT. CCBT has potential to improve access to evidence-based therapies, and to overcome the prohibitive costs and lack of availability sometimes associated with retaining a human therapist. In this context, it is important not to confuse CBT with 'computer-based training', which nowadays is more commonly referred to as e-Learning.

Although improvements in both research quality and treatment adherence is required before advocating for the global dissemination of CCBT, it has been found in meta-studies to be cost-effective and often cheaper than usual care, including for anxiety and PTSD. Studies have shown that individuals with social anxiety and depression experienced improvement with online CBT-based methods. A study assessing an online version of CBT for people with mild-to-moderate PTSD found that the online approach was as effective as, and cheaper than, the same therapy given face-to-face. A review of current CCBT research in the treatment of OCD in children found this interface to hold great potential for future treatment of OCD in youths and adolescent populations. Additionally, most internet interventions for post-traumatic stress disorder use CCBT. CCBT is also predisposed to treating mood disorders amongst non-heterosexual populations, who may avoid face-to-face therapy from fear of stigma. However presently CCBT programs seldom cater to these populations.

In February 2006 NICE recommended that CCBT be made available for use within the NHS across England and Wales for patients presenting with mild-to-moderate depression, rather than immediately opting for antidepressant medication, and CCBT is made available by some health systems. The 2009 NICE guideline recognized that there are likely to be a number of computerized CBT products that are useful to patients, but removed endorsement of any specific product.

=== Smartphone app-delivered ===
Another new method of access is the use of mobile app or smartphone applications to deliver self-help or guided CBT. Active research is underway including real-world data studies that measure effectiveness and engagement of text-based smartphone chatbot apps for delivery of CBT using a text-based conversational interface. Recent market research and analysis of over 500 online mental healthcare solutions identified 3 key challenges in this market: quality of the content, guidance of the user and personalisation.

A study compared CBT alone with a mindfulness-based therapy combined with CBT, both delivered via an app. It found that mindfulness-based self-help reduced the severity of depression more than CBT self-help in the short-term. Overall, NHS costs for the mindfulness approach were £500 less per person than for CBT.

== Types ==
=== Brief cognitive behavioral therapy ===
Brief cognitive behavioral therapy (BCBT) is a form of CBT which has been developed for situations in which there are time constraints on the therapy sessions and specifically for those struggling with suicidal ideation and/or making suicide attempts. BCBT was based on Rudd's proposed "suicidal mode", an elaboration of Beck's modal theory. BCBT takes place over a couple of sessions that can last up to 12 accumulated hours by design. This technique was first implemented and developed with soldiers on active duty by Dr. M. David Rudd to prevent suicide.

Breakdown of treatment

1. Orientation
  1. Commitment to treatment
  2. Crisis response and safety planning
  3. Means restriction
  4. Survival kit
  5. Reasons for living card
  6. Model of suicidality
  7. Treatment journal
  8. Lessons learned
2. Skill focus
  1. Skill development worksheets
  2. Coping cards
  3. Demonstration
  4. Practice
  5. Skill refinement
3. Relapse prevention
  1. Skill generalization
  2. Skill refinement

=== Cognitive emotional behavioral therapy ===
Cognitive emotional behavioral therapy (CEBT) is a form of CBT developed initially for individuals with eating disorders but now used with a range of problems including anxiety, depression, obsessive–compulsive disorder (OCD), post-traumatic stress disorder (PTSD) and anger problems. It combines aspects of CBT and dialectical behavior therapy and aims to improve understanding and tolerance of emotions in order to facilitate the therapeutic process. It is frequently used as a "pretreatment" to prepare and better equip individuals for longer-term therapy.

=== Structured cognitive behavioral training ===
Structured cognitive-behavioral training (SCBT) is a cognitive-based process with core philosophies that draw heavily from CBT. Like CBT, SCBT asserts that behavior is inextricably related to beliefs, thoughts, and emotions. SCBT also builds on core CBT philosophy by incorporating other well-known modalities in the fields of behavioral health and psychology: most notably, Albert Ellis's rational emotive behavior therapy. SCBT differs from CBT in two distinct ways. First, SCBT is delivered in a highly regimented format. Second, SCBT is a predetermined and finite training process that becomes personalized by the input of the participant. SCBT is designed to bring a participant to a specific result in a specific period of time. SCBT has been used to challenge addictive behavior, particularly with substances such as tobacco, alcohol and food, and to manage diabetes and subdue stress and anxiety. SCBT has also been used in the field of criminal psychology in the effort to reduce recidivism.

=== Moral reconation therapy ===
Moral reconation therapy, a type of CBT used to help felons overcome antisocial personality disorder (ASPD), slightly decreases the risk of further offending. It is generally implemented in a group format because of the risk of offenders with ASPD being given one-on-one therapy reinforces narcissistic behavioral characteristics, and can be used in correctional or outpatient settings. Groups usually meet weekly for two to six months.

=== Stress inoculation training ===
This type of therapy uses a blend of cognitive, behavioral, and certain humanistic training techniques to target the stressors of the client. This is usually used to help clients better cope with their stress or anxiety after stressful events. This is a three-phase process that trains the client to use skills that they already have to better adapt to their current stressors. The first phase is an interview phase that includes psychological testing, client self-monitoring, and a variety of reading materials. This allows the therapist to individually tailor the training process to the client. Clients learn how to categorize problems into emotion-focused or problem-focused so that they can better treat their negative situations. This phase ultimately prepares the client to eventually confront and reflect upon their current reactions to stressors, before looking at ways to change their reactions and emotions to their stressors. The focus is conceptualization.

The second phase emphasizes the aspect of skills acquisition and rehearsal that continues from the earlier phase of conceptualization. The client is taught skills that help them cope with their stressors. These skills are then practiced in the space of therapy. These skills involve self-regulation, problem-solving, interpersonal communication skills, etc.

The third and final phase is the application and following through of the skills learned in the training process. This gives the client opportunities to apply their learned skills to a wide range of stressors. Activities include role-playing, imagery, modeling, etc. In the end, the client will have been trained on a preventive basis to inoculate personal, chronic, and future stressors by breaking down their stressors into problems they will address in long-term, short-term, and intermediate coping goals.

=== Mindfulness-based cognitive behavioral hypnotherapy ===
Mindfulness-based cognitive behavioral hypnotherapy (MCBH) is a form of CBT that focuses on awareness in a reflective approach, addressing subconscious tendencies. It is more the process that contains three phases for achieving wanted goals and integrates the principles of mindfulness and cognitive-behavioral techniques with the transformative potential of hypnotherapy.

=== Unified Protocol ===
The Unified Protocol for Transdiagnostic Treatment of Emotional Disorders (UP) is a form of CBT, developed by David H. Barlow and researchers at Boston University, that can be applied to a range of anxiety disorders. The rationale is that anxiety and depression disorders often occur together due to common underlying causes and can efficiently be treated together.

The UP includes a common set of components:

1. Psycho-education
2. Cognitive reappraisal
3. Emotion regulation
4. Changing behaviour

The UP has been shown to produce equivalent results to single-diagnosis protocols for specific disorders, such as OCD and social anxiety disorder. Several studies have shown that the UP is easier to disseminate as compared to single-diagnosis protocols.

== Applications and effectiveness ==
In adults, CBT has been shown to be an effective part of treatment plans for anxiety disorders, body dysmorphic disorder, depression, eating disorders, chronic low back pain, menopausal vasomotor symptoms, personality disorders, psychosis, schizophrenia, substance use disorders, and bipolar disorder. It is also effective as part of treatment plans in the adjustment, depression, and anxiety associated with fibromyalgia, and as part of the treatment after spinal cord injuries.

When compared to psychoactive medications, review studies have found CBT alone to be as effective for treating less severe forms of depression and borderline personality disorder. Some research suggests that CBT is most effective when combined with medication for treating mental disorders such as major depressive disorder.

In children or adolescents, CBT is an effective part of treatment plans for anxiety disorders, body dysmorphic disorder, depression and suicidality, eating disorders and obesity, obsessive–compulsive disorder (OCD), post-traumatic stress disorder (PTSD), tic disorders, trichotillomania, and other repetitive behavior disorders. CBT has also been used to help improve a variety of childhood disorders, including depressive disorders and various anxiety disorders. CBT has shown to be the most effective intervention for people exposed to adverse childhood experiences in the form of abuse or neglect.

Researchers have found that other bona fide therapeutic interventions were equally effective for treating certain conditions in adults.

Criticism of CBT sometimes focuses on implementations (such as the UK IAPT) which may result initially in low quality therapy being offered by poorly trained practitioners. However, evidence supports the effectiveness of CBT for anxiety and depression.

Evidence suggests that the addition of hypnotherapy as an adjunct to CBT improves treatment efficacy for a variety of clinical issues.

The United Kingdom's National Institute for Health and Care Excellence (NICE) recommends CBT in the treatment plans for a number of mental health difficulties, including PTSD, OCD, bulimia nervosa, and clinical depression.

=== Depression and anxiety disorders ===
Cognitive behavioral therapy has been shown as an effective treatment for clinical depression. Among psychotherapeutic approaches for major depressive disorder, cognitive behavioral therapy and interpersonal psychotherapy are recommended by clinical practice guidelines including The American Psychiatric Association Practice (APA) Guidelines (April 2000), and the APA endorsed Veteran Affairs clinical practice guideline.

CBT has been shown to be effective in the treatment of adults with anxiety disorders. There is also evidence that using CBT to treat children and adolescents with anxiety disorders was probably more effective (in the short term) than wait list or no treatment and more effective than attention control treatment approaches. Some meta-analyses find CBT more effective than psychodynamic therapy and equal to other therapies in treating anxiety and depression. A 2013 meta-analysis suggested that CBT, interpersonal therapy, and problem-solving therapy outperformed psychodynamic psychotherapy and behavioral activation in the treatment of depression. According to a 2004 review by INSERM of three methods, cognitive behavioral therapy was either proven or presumed to be an effective therapy on several mental disorders. This included depression, panic disorder, post-traumatic stress, and other anxiety disorders.

A systematic review of CBT in depression and anxiety disorders concluded that "CBT delivered in primary care, especially including computer- or Internet-based self-help programs, is potentially more effective than usual care and could be delivered effectively by primary care therapists."

A 2024 systematic review found that exposure and response prevention (ERP), a specific form of cognitive behavioral therapy, is considered a first-line treatment for pediatric obsessive–compulsive disorder (OCD). Research indicates that ERP is effective in both in-person and remote settings, providing flexibility in treatment delivery without compromising efficacy.

According to The Anxiety and Worry Workbook: The Cognitive Behavioral Solution by Clark and Beck:

In CBT, you work on reducing fear by changing how you think and act. Instead of thinking of the fear object (for example, a spider) as an imminent threat or danger, you're taught to reevaluate the fear object as less threatening to your safety and well-being. Instead of avoiding or running from the fear, you're encouraged to face the fear.

==== Theoretical approaches ====
One etiological theory of depression is Aaron T. Beck's cognitive theory of depression. His theory states that depressed people think the way they do because their thinking is biased towards negative interpretations. Beck's theory rests on the aspect of cognitive behavioral therapy known as schemata. Schemata are the mental maps used to integrate new information into memories and to organize existing information in the mind. An example of a schema would be a person hearing the word "dog" and picturing different versions of the animal that they have grouped together in their mind. According to this theory, depressed people acquire a negative schema of the world in childhood and adolescence as an effect of stressful life events, and the negative schema is activated later in life when the person encounters similar situations.

Beck also described a negative cognitive triad. The cognitive triad is made up of the depressed individual's negative evaluations of themselves, the world, and the future. Beck suggested that these negative evaluations derive from the negative schemata and cognitive biases of the person. According to this theory, depressed people have views such as "I never do a good job", "It is impossible to have a good day", and "things will never get better". A negative schema helps give rise to the cognitive bias, and the cognitive bias helps fuel the negative schema. Beck further proposed that depressed people often have the following cognitive biases: arbitrary inference, selective abstraction, overgeneralization, magnification, and minimization. These cognitive biases are quick to make negative, generalized, and personal inferences of the self, thus fueling the negative schema.

On the other hand, a positive cognitive triad relates to a person's positive evaluations of themself, the world, and the future. More specifically, a positive cognitive triad requires self-esteem when viewing oneself and hope for the future. A person with a positive cognitive triad has a positive schema used for viewing themself in addition to a positive schema for the world and for the future. Cognitive behavioral research suggests a positive cognitive triad bolsters resilience, or the ability to cope with stressful events. Increased levels of resilience is associated with greater resistance to depression.

Another major theoretical approach to cognitive behavioral therapy treatment is the concept of Locus of Control outlined in Julian Rotter's Social Learning Theory. Locus of control refers to the degree to which an individual's sense of control is either internal or external. An internal locus of control exists when an individual views an outcome of a particular action as being reliant on themselves and their personal attributes whereas an external locus of control exists when an individual views other's or some outside, intangible force such as luck or fate as being responsible for the outcome of a particular action.

A basic concept in some CBT treatments used in anxiety disorders is in vivo exposure. CBT-exposure therapy refers to the direct confrontation of feared objects, activities, or situations by a patient. For example, a woman with PTSD who fears the location where she was assaulted may be assisted by her therapist in going to that location and directly confronting those fears. Likewise, a person with a social anxiety disorder who fears public speaking may be instructed to directly confront those fears by giving a speech. This "two-factor" model is often credited to O. Hobart Mowrer. Through exposure to the stimulus, this harmful conditioning can be "unlearned" (referred to as extinction and habituation).

CBT for children with phobias is normally delivered over multiple sessions, but one-session treatment has been shown to be equally effective and is cheaper.

==== Specialized forms of CBT ====
CBT-SP, an adaptation of CBT for suicide prevention (SP), was specifically designed for treating youths who are severely depressed and who have recently attempted suicide within the past 90 days, and was found to be effective, feasible, and acceptable.

Acceptance and commitment therapy (ACT) is a specialist branch of CBT (sometimes referred to as contextual CBT). ACT uses mindfulness and acceptance interventions and has been found to have a greater longevity in therapeutic outcomes. In a study with anxiety, CBT and ACT improved similarly across all outcomes from pre- to post-treatment. However, during a 12-month follow-up, ACT proved to be more effective, showing that it is a highly viable lasting treatment model for anxiety disorders.

Computerized CBT (CCBT) has been proven to be effective by randomized controlled and other trials in treating depression and anxiety disorders, including children. Some research has found similar effectiveness to an intervention of informational websites and weekly telephone calls. CCBT was found to be equally effective as face-to-face CBT in adolescent anxiety.

==== Combined with other treatments ====
Studies have provided evidence that when examining animals and humans, that glucocorticoids may lead to a more successful extinction learning during exposure therapy for anxiety disorders. For instance, glucocorticoids can prevent aversive learning episodes from being retrieved and heighten reinforcement of memory traces creating a non-fearful reaction in feared situations. A combination of glucocorticoids and exposure therapy may be a better-improved treatment for treating people with anxiety disorders.

==== Prevention ====
For anxiety disorders, use of CBT with people at risk has significantly reduced the number of episodes of generalized anxiety disorder and other anxiety symptoms, and also given significant improvements in explanatory style, hopelessness, and dysfunctional attitudes. In another study, 3% of the group receiving the CBT intervention developed generalized anxiety disorder by 12 months postintervention compared with 14% in the control group. Individuals with subthreshold levels of panic disorder significantly benefitted from use of CBT. Use of CBT was found to significantly reduce social anxiety prevalence.

For depressive disorders, a stepped-care intervention (watchful waiting, CBT and medication if appropriate) achieved a 50% lower incidence rate in a patient group aged 75 or older. Another depression study found a neutral effect compared to personal, social, and health education, and usual school provision, and included a comment on potential for increased depression scores from people who have received CBT due to greater self recognition and acknowledgement of existing symptoms of depression and negative thinking styles. A further study also saw a neutral result. A meta-study of the Coping with Depression course, a cognitive behavioral intervention delivered by a psychoeducational method, saw a 38% reduction in risk of major depression.

=== Bipolar disorder ===
Many studies show CBT, combined with pharmacotherapy, is effective in improving depressive symptoms, mania severity and psychosocial functioning with mild to moderate effects, and that the combination of CBT and medication is more effective than medication alone.

INSERM's 2004 review found that CBT is an effective therapy for several mental disorders, including bipolar disorder. This included schizophrenia, depression, bipolar disorder, panic disorder, post-traumatic stress, anxiety disorders, bulimia, anorexia, personality disorders and alcohol dependency.

=== Psychosis ===
In long-term psychoses, CBT is used to complement medication and is adapted to meet individual needs. Interventions particularly related to these conditions include exploring reality testing, changing delusions and hallucinations, examining factors which precipitate relapse, and managing relapses. Meta-analyses confirm the effectiveness of metacognitive training (MCT) for the improvement of positive symptoms (e.g., delusions).

For people at risk of psychosis, in 2014 the UK National Institute for Health and Care Excellence (NICE) recommended preventive CBT.

=== Schizophrenia ===
INSERM's 2004 review found that CBT is an effective therapy for several mental disorders, including schizophrenia.

A Cochrane review reported CBT had "no effect on long‐term risk of relapse" and no additional effect above standard care. A 2015 systematic review investigated the effects of CBT compared with other psychosocial therapies for people with schizophrenia and determined that there is no clear advantage over other, often less expensive, interventions but acknowledged that better quality evidence is needed before firm conclusions can be drawn.

=== Addiction and substance use disorders ===
==== Pathological and problem gambling ====
CBT is also used for pathological and problem gambling. The percentage of people who problem gamble is 1–3% around the world. Cognitive behavioral therapy develops skills for relapse prevention and someone can learn to control their mind and manage high-risk cases. There is evidence of efficacy of CBT for treating pathological and problem gambling at immediate follow up, however the longer term efficacy of CBT for it is currently unknown.

==== Smoking cessation ====
CBT looks at the habit of smoking cigarettes as a learned behavior, which later evolves into a coping strategy to handle daily stressors. Since smoking is often easily accessible and quickly allows the user to feel good, it can take precedence over other coping strategies, and eventually work its way into everyday life during non-stressful events as well. CBT aims to target the function of the behavior, as it can vary between individuals, and works to inject other coping mechanisms in place of smoking. CBT also aims to support individuals with strong cravings, which are a major reported reason for relapse during treatment.

A 2008 controlled study out of Stanford University School of Medicine suggested CBT may be an effective tool to help maintain abstinence. The results of 304 random adult participants were tracked over the course of one year. During this program, some participants were provided medication, CBT, 24-hour phone support, or some combination of the three methods. At 20 weeks, the participants who received CBT had a 45% abstinence rate, versus non-CBT participants, who had a 29% abstinence rate. Overall, the study concluded that emphasizing cognitive and behavioral strategies to support smoking cessation can help individuals build tools for long term smoking abstinence.

Mental health history can affect the outcomes of treatment. Individuals with a history of depressive disorders had a lower rate of success when using CBT alone to combat smoking addiction.

A 2019 Cochrane review was unable to find sufficient evidence to differentiate effects between CBT and hypnosis for smoking cessation and highlighted that a review of the current research showed variable results for both modalities.

==== Substance use disorders ====
Studies have shown CBT to be an effective treatment for substance use disorders. For individuals with substance use disorders, CBT aims to reframe maladaptive thoughts, such as denial, minimizing and catastrophizing thought patterns, with healthier narratives. Specific techniques include identifying potential triggers and developing coping mechanisms to manage high-risk situations. Research has shown CBT to be particularly effective when combined with other therapy-based treatments or medication.

INSERM's 2004 review found that CBT is an effective therapy for several mental disorders, including alcohol dependency.

==== Internet addiction ====
Research has identified Internet addiction as a new clinical disorder that causes relational, occupational, and social problems. CBT has been suggested as the treatment of choice for Internet addiction, and addiction recovery in general has used CBT as part of treatment planning.

=== Eating disorders ===
Though many forms of treatment can support individuals with eating disorders, CBT is proven to be a more effective treatment than medications and interpersonal psychotherapy alone. CBT aims to combat major causes of distress such as negative cognitions surrounding body weight, shape and size. CBT therapists also work with individuals to regulate strong emotions and thoughts that lead to dangerous compensatory behaviors. CBT is the first line of treatment for bulimia nervosa, and non-specific eating disorders. While there is evidence to support the efficacy of CBT for bulimia nervosa and binging, the evidence is somewhat variable and limited by small study sizes. INSERM's 2004 review found that CBT is an effective therapy for several mental disorders, including bulimia and anorexia nervosa.

=== With autistic adults ===
Emerging evidence for cognitive behavioral interventions aimed at reducing symptoms of depression, anxiety, and obsessive–compulsive disorder in autistic adults without intellectual disability has been identified through a systematic review. While the research was focused on adults, cognitive behavioral interventions have also been beneficial to autistic children. A 2021 Cochrane review found limited evidence regarding the efficacy of CBT for obsessive–compulsive disorder in adults with Autism Spectrum Disorder stating a need for further study.

=== Dementia and mild cognitive impairment ===
A Cochrane review in 2022 found that adults with dementia and mild cognitive impairment (MCI) who experience symptoms of depression may benefit from CBT, whereas other counselling or supportive interventions might not improve symptoms significantly. Across 5 different psychometric scales, where higher scores indicate severity of depression, adults receiving CBT reported somewhat lower mood scores than those receiving usual care for dementia and MCI overall. In this review, a sub-group analysis found clinically significant benefits only among those diagnosed with dementia, rather than MCI.

The likelihood of remission from depression also appeared to be 84% higher following CBT, though the evidence for this was less certain. Anxiety, cognition and other neuropsychiatric symptoms were not significantly improved following CBT, however this review did find moderate evidence of improved quality of life and daily living activity scores in those with dementia and MCI.

=== Post-traumatic stress ===
Cognitive behavioral therapy interventions may have some benefits for people who have post-traumatic stress related to surviving rape, sexual abuse, or sexual assault. There is strong evidence that CBT-exposure therapy can reduce PTSD symptoms and lead to the loss of a PTSD diagnosis. In addition, CBT has also been shown to be effective for post-traumatic stress disorder in very young children (3 to 6 years of age). There is lower quality evidence that CBT may be more effective than other psychotherapies in reducing symptoms of posttraumatic stress disorder in children and adolescents.

=== Other uses ===
Evidence suggests a possible role for CBT in the treatment of attention deficit hyperactivity disorder (ADHD), hypochondriasis, and bipolar disorder, but more study is needed and results should be interpreted with caution. Moderate evidence from a 2024 systematic review supports the effectiveness of CBT and neurofeedback as part of psychosocial interventions for improving ADHD symptoms in children and adolescents.

CBT has been studied as an aid in the treatment of anxiety associated with stuttering. Initial studies have shown CBT to be effective in reducing social anxiety in adults who stutter, but not in reducing stuttering frequency.

There is some evidence that CBT is superior in the long-term to benzodiazepines and the nonbenzodiazepines in the treatment and management of insomnia. Computerized CBT (CCBT) has been proven to be effective by randomized controlled and other trials in treating insomnia. Some research has found similar effectiveness to an intervention of informational websites and weekly telephone calls. CCBT was found to be equally effective as face-to-face CBT in insomnia.

A Cochrane review of interventions aimed at preventing psychological stress in healthcare workers found that CBT was more effective than no intervention but no more effective than alternative stress-reduction interventions.

Cochrane Reviews have found no convincing evidence that CBT training helps foster care providers manage difficult behaviors in the youths under their care, nor was it helpful in treating people who abuse their intimate partners.

A 2025 scoping review identified CBT as one of the most frequently studied psychotherapeutic interventions for adults with mild to moderate intellectual disability, while noting substantial variation in how interventions and outcomes were defined and measured.

CBT has been applied in both clinical and non-clinical environments to treat disorders such as personality disorders and behavioral problems. INSERM's 2004 review found that CBT is an effective therapy for personality disorders.

CBT has been used with other researchers as well to minimize chronic pain and help relieve symptoms from those suffering from irritable bowel syndrome (IBS).

==== Individuals with medical conditions ====
In the case of people with metastatic breast cancer, data is limited but CBT and other psychosocial interventions might help with psychological outcomes and pain management. There is also some evidence that CBT may help reduce insomnia in cancer patients.

There is some evidence that using CBT for symptomatic management of non-specific chest pain is probably effective in the short term. However, the findings were limited by small trials and the evidence was considered of questionable quality. Cochrane reviews have found no evidence that CBT is effective for tinnitus, although there appears to be an effect on management of associated depression and quality of life in this condition. CBT combined with hypnosis and distraction reduces self-reported pain in children.

There is limited evidence to support CBT's use in managing the impact of multiple sclerosis, sleep disturbances related to aging, and dysmenorrhea, but more study is needed and results should be interpreted with caution.

Previously CBT has been considered as moderately effective for treating myalgic encephalomyelitis/chronic fatigue syndrome (ME/CFS), however a National Institutes of Health Pathways to Prevention Workshop stated that in respect of improving treatment options for ME/CFS that the modest benefit from cognitive behavioral therapy should be studied as an adjunct to other methods. The Centres for Disease Control advice on the treatment of ME/CFS makes no reference to CBT while the National Institute for Health and Care Excellence states that cognitive behavioral therapy (CBT) has sometimes been assumed to be a cure for ME/CFS, however, it should only be offered to support people who live with ME/CFS to manage their symptoms, improve their functioning and reduce the distress associated with having a chronic illness.

== Criticisms ==
=== Relative effectiveness ===
The research conducted for CBT has been a topic of sustained controversy. While some researchers write that CBT is more effective than other treatments, many other researchers and practitioners have questioned the validity of such claims. For example, one study determined CBT to be superior to other treatments in treating anxiety and depression. However, researchers responding directly to that study conducted a re-analysis and found no evidence of CBT being superior to other, non-CBT treatments, and conducted an analysis of thirteen other CBT clinical trials and determined that they failed to provide evidence of CBT superiority. Another example is the £5 million PACE trial, of which the results were claimed to show that CBT, and graded exercise therapy (GET) cured Myalgic encephalomyelitis/chronic fatigue syndrome. But, when the PACE results were later comprehensively reanalyzed and subjects followed-up, it was found that the CBT and GET treatments were not effective and possibly not safe. The PACE study's design was riddled with design flaws such as lacking both single and double blinding and engaging in the retrospective manipulation of primary outcome measures while systematically ignoring ME/CFS sufferers' negative health outcomes as consequences of engaging in CBT and GET. In cases where CBT has been reported to be statistically better than other psychological interventions in terms of primary outcome measures, effect sizes were small and suggested that those differences were clinically meaningless and insignificant. Nonetheless, CBT remains widely recognized for its structured approach to identifying and modifying maladaptive cognitive appraisals, which has been associated with improved emotional regulation in individuals with mood and anxiety disorders. Moreover, on secondary outcomes (i.e., measures of general functioning) no significant differences have been typically found between CBT and other treatments.

A major criticism has been that clinical studies of CBT efficacy (or any psychotherapy) are not double-blind (i.e., either the subjects or the therapists in psychotherapy studies are not blind to the type of treatment). They may be single-blinded, i.e. the rater may not know the treatment the patient received, but neither the patients nor the therapists are blinded to the type of therapy given (two out of three of the persons involved in the trial, i.e., all of the persons involved in the treatment, are unblinded). The patient is an active participant in correcting negative distorted thoughts, thus quite aware of the treatment group they are in.

The importance of double-blinding was shown in a meta-analysis that examined the effectiveness of CBT when placebo control and blindness were factored in. Pooled data from published trials of CBT in schizophrenia, major depressive disorder (MDD), and bipolar disorder that used controls for non-specific effects of intervention were analyzed. This study concluded that CBT is no better than non-specific control interventions in the treatment of schizophrenia and does not reduce relapse rates; treatment effects are small in treatment studies of MDD, and it is not an effective treatment strategy for prevention of relapse in bipolar disorder. For MDD, the authors note that the pooled effect size was very low.

=== Declining effectiveness ===
Additionally, a 2015 meta-analysis revealed that the positive effects of CBT on depression have been declining since 1977. The overall results showed two different declines in effect sizes: 1) an overall decline between 1977 and 2014, and 2) a steeper decline between 1995 and 2014. Additional sub-analysis revealed that CBT studies where therapists in the test group were instructed to adhere to the Beck CBT manual had a steeper decline in effect sizes since 1977 than studies where therapists in the test group were instructed to use CBT without a manual. The authors reported that they were unsure why the effects were declining but did list inadequate therapist training, failure to adhere to a manual, lack of therapist experience, and patients' hope and faith in its efficacy waning as potential reasons. The authors did mention that the current study was limited to depressive disorders only.

=== High drop-out rates ===
Furthermore, other researchers write that CBT studies have high drop-out rates compared to other treatments. One meta-analysis found that CBT drop-out rates were 17% higher than those of other therapies. This high drop-out rate is also evident in the treatment of several disorders, particularly the eating disorder anorexia nervosa, which is commonly treated with CBT. Those treated with CBT have a high chance of dropping out of therapy before completion and reverting to their anorexia behaviors.

Other researchers analyzing treatments for youths who self-injure found similar drop-out rates in CBT and DBT groups. In this study, the researchers analyzed several clinical trials that measured the efficacy of CBT administered to youths who self-injure. The researchers concluded that none of them were found to be efficacious.

=== Philosophical concerns with CBT methods ===
The methods employed in CBT research have not been the only criticisms; some individuals have called its theory and therapy into question.

Slife and Williams write that one of the hidden assumptions in CBT is that of determinism, or the absence of free will. They argue that CBT holds that external stimuli from the environment enter the mind, causing different thoughts that cause emotional states: nowhere in CBT theory is agency, or free will, accounted for.

Another criticism of CBT theory, especially as applied to major depressive disorder (MDD), is that it confounds the symptoms of the disorder with its causes. Other criticisms include that CBT may view people as stupid or can address only simple or superficial problems.

=== Side effects ===
CBT is generally regarded as having very few if any side effects. Calls have been made by some for more appraisal of possible side effects of CBT. Many randomized trials of psychological interventions like CBT do not monitor potential harms to the patient. In contrast, randomized trials of pharmacological interventions are much more likely to take adverse effects into consideration.

A 2017 meta-analysis revealed that adverse events are not common in children receiving CBT and, furthermore, that CBT is associated with fewer dropouts than either placebo or medications. Nevertheless, CBT therapists do sometimes report 'unwanted events' and side effects in their outpatients with "negative wellbeing/distress" being the most frequent.

== Society and culture ==
The UK's National Health Service announced in 2008 that more therapists would be trained to provide CBT at government expense as part of an initiative called Improving Access to Psychological Therapies (IAPT). The NICE said that CBT would become the mainstay of treatment for non-severe depression, with medication used only in cases where CBT had failed. Therapists complained that the data does not fully support the attention and funding CBT receives. Psychotherapist and professor Andrew Samuels stated that this constitutes "a coup, a power play by a community that has suddenly found itself on the brink of corralling an enormous amount of money ... Everyone has been seduced by CBT's apparent cheapness."

The UK Council for Psychotherapy issued a press release in 2012 saying that the IAPT's policies were undermining traditional psychotherapy and criticized proposals that would limit some approved therapies to CBT, claiming that they restricted patients to "a watered-down version of cognitive behavioural therapy (CBT), often delivered by very lightly trained staff".
