= Cognitive therapy =

Type of psychotherapy

- MeSH: D015928

Cognitive therapy (CT) is a kind of psychotherapy that treats problematic behaviors and distressing emotional responses by identifying and correcting unhelpful and inaccurate patterns of thinking. This involves the individual working with the therapist to develop skills for testing and changing beliefs, identifying distorted thinking, relating to others in different ways, and changing behaviors.

Cognitive therapy is based on the cognitive model (which states that thoughts, feelings, and behavior are connected), with substantial influence from the heuristics and biases research program of the 1970s, which found a wide variety of cognitive biases and distortions that can contribute to mental illness.

== History ==
Precursors of certain aspects of cognitive therapy have been identified in various old traditions.

Albert Ellis worked on cognitive treatment methods from the 1950s (Ellis, 1956). He called his approach Rational Therapy (RT) at first, then Rational Emotive Therapy (RET) and later Rational Emotive Behavior Therapy (REBT).

Becoming disillusioned with long-term psychodynamic approaches based on gaining insight into unconscious emotions, in the late 1950s Aaron T. Beck came to the conclusion that the way in which his patients perceived and attributed meaning in their daily lives—a process known as cognition—was a key to therapy.

Beck introduced his cognitive therapy approach in Depression: Causes and Treatment (1967), later expanding its application to include anxiety disorders in Cognitive Therapy and the Emotional Disorders (1976), and eventually addressing a wider range of psychological conditions. He also introduced a focus on the underlying "schema"—the underlying ways in which people process information about the self, the world or the future.

This new cognitive approach came into conflict with the behaviorism common at the time, which claimed that talk of mental causes was not scientific or meaningful, and that assessing stimuli and behavioral responses was the best way to practice psychology. However, the 1970s saw a general "cognitive revolution" in psychology. Behavioral modification techniques and cognitive therapy techniques became joined, giving rise to a common concept of cognitive behavioral therapy. Although cognitive therapy has often included some behavioral components, advocates of Beck's particular approach sought to maintain and establish its integrity as a distinct, standardized form of cognitive behavioral therapy in which the cognitive shift is the key mechanism of change.

Aaron and his daughter Judith S. Beck founded the Beck Institute for Cognitive Therapy and Research in 1994. This was later renamed the "Beck Institute for Cognitive Behavior Therapy."

In 1995, Judith released Cognitive Therapy: Basics and Beyond, a treatment manual endorsed by her father Aaron.

As cognitive therapy continued to grow in popularity, the non-profit "Academy of Cognitive Therapy" was created in 1998 to accredit cognitive therapists, create a forum for members to share research and interventions, and to educate the public about cognitive therapy and related mental health issues. The academy later changed its name to the "Academy of Cognitive & Behavioral Therapies".

The 2011 second edition of "Basics and Beyond" (also endorsed by Aaron T. Beck) was titled Cognitive Behavioral Therapy: Basics and Beyond, Second Edition, and adopted the name "CBT" for Aaron's therapy from its beginning. This further blurred the boundaries between the concepts of "CT" and "CBT".

== Basis ==
Therapy may consist of testing the assumptions which one makes and looking for new information that could help shift the assumptions in a way that leads to different emotional or behavioral reactions. Change may begin by targeting thoughts (to change emotion and behavior), behavior (to change feelings and thoughts), or the individual's goals (by identifying thoughts, feelings or behavior that conflict with the goals). Beck initially focused on depression and developed a list of "errors" (cognitive distortion) in thinking that he proposed could maintain depression, including arbitrary inference, selective abstraction, overgeneralization, and magnification (of negatives) and minimization (of positives).

As an example of how CT might work: Having made a mistake at work, a man may believe: "I'm useless and can't do anything right at work." He may then focus on the mistake (which he takes as evidence that his belief is true), and his thoughts about being "useless" are likely to lead to negative emotion (frustration, sadness, hopelessness). Given these thoughts and feelings, he may then begin to avoid challenges at work, which is behavior that could provide even more evidence for him that his belief is true. As a result, any adaptive response and further constructive consequences become unlikely, and he may focus even more on any mistakes he may make, which serve to reinforce the original belief of being "useless." In therapy, this example could be identified as a self-fulfilling prophecy or "problem cycle," and the efforts of the therapist and patient would be directed at working together to explore and change this cycle.

People who are working with a cognitive therapist often practice more flexible ways to think and respond, learning to ask themselves whether their thoughts are completely true, and whether those thoughts are helping them to meet their goals. Thoughts that do not meet this description may then be shifted to something more accurate or helpful, leading to more positive emotion, more desirable behavior, and movement toward the person's goals. Cognitive therapy takes a skill-building approach, where the therapist helps the person to learn and practice these skills independently, eventually "becoming their own therapist."

"Consistent with the cognitive theory of psychopathology, CT is designed to be structured, directive, active, and time-limited, with the express purpose of identifying, reality-testing, and correcting distorted cognition and underlying dysfunctional beliefs".

=== Cognitive model ===
Aaron Beck developed the cognitive model to explain how negative thinking patterns contribute to depression. The model identifies three levels of belief: automatic thoughts, intermediate beliefs, and core beliefs

- Automatic thought
- Intermediate belief
- Core belief or basic belief

In 2014, an update of the cognitive model was proposed, called the Generic Cognitive Model (GCM). The GCM is an update of Beck's model that proposes that mental disorders can be differentiated by the nature of their dysfunctional beliefs. The GCM includes a conceptual framework and a clinical approach for understanding common cognitive processes of mental disorders while specifying the unique features of the specific disorders.

=== Cognitive restructuring (methods) ===
Cognitive restructuring consists of four main steps:

1. Identifying problematic thoughts, known as automatic thoughts (ATs), which often reflect negative views of the self, the world, or the future.
2. Identifying cognitive distortions in those thoughts.
3. Using the Socratic method to dispute the validity of these thoughts.
4. Developing rational, more balanced responses to replace these negative thoughts.

There are six types of automatic thoughts:

1. Self-evaluated thoughts
2. Thoughts about the evaluations of others
3. Evaluative thoughts about the other person with whom they are interacting
4. Thoughts about coping strategies and behavioral plans
5. Thoughts of avoidance
6. Any other thoughts that were not categorized

Other major techniques include:

- Activity monitoring and activity scheduling
- Behavioral experiments
- Catching, checking, and changing thoughts
- Collaborative empiricism: therapist and patient become investigators by examining the evidence to support or reject the patient's cognitions. Empirical evidence is used to determine whether particular cognitions serve any useful purpose.
- Downward arrow technique
- Exposure and response prevention
- Cost benefit analysis
- acting "as if"
- Guided discovery: therapist elucidates behavioral problems and faulty thinking by designing new experiences that lead to acquisition of new skills and perspectives. Through both cognitive and behavioral methods, the patient discovers more adaptive ways of thinking and coping with environmental stressors by correcting cognitive processing.
- Mastery and pleasure technique
- Problem solving
- Socratic questioning: involves the creation of a series of questions to a) clarify and define problems, b) assist in the identification of thoughts, images and assumptions, c) examine the meanings of events for the patient, and d) assess the consequences of maintaining maladaptive thoughts and behaviors.

==== Socratic questioning ====
Socratic questions are the archetypal cognitive restructuring techniques. These kinds of questions are designed to challenge assumptions by:

- Conceiving reasonable alternatives:

"What might be another explanation or viewpoint of the situation? Why else did it happen?"

- Evaluating those consequences:

"What's the effect of thinking or believing this? What could be the effect of thinking differently and no longer holding onto this belief?"

- Distancing:

"Imagine a specific friend/family member in the same situation or if they viewed the situation this way, what would I tell them?"

Examples of socratic questions are:

- "Describe the way you formed your viewpoint originally."
- "What initially convinced you that your current view is the best one available?"
- "Think of three pieces of evidence that contradict this view, or that support the opposite view. Think about the opposite of this viewpoint and reflect on it for a moment. What's the strongest argument in favor of this opposite view?"
- "Write down any specific benefits you get from holding this belief, such as social or psychological benefits. For example, getting to be part of a community of like-minded people, feeling good about yourself or the world, feeling that your viewpoint is superior to others", etc. Are there any reasons that you might hold this view other than because it's true?"
- "For instance, does holding this viewpoint provide some peace of mind that holding a different viewpoint would not?"
- "In order to refine your viewpoint so that it's as accurate as possible, it's important to challenge it directly on occasion and consider whether there are reasons that it might not be true. What do you think the best or strongest argument against this perspective is?"
- "What would you have to experience or find out in order for you to change your mind about this viewpoint?"
- "Given your thoughts so far, do you think that there may be a truer, more accurate, or more nuanced version of your original view that you could state right now?"

==== False assumptions ====
False assumptions are based on "cognitive distortions", such as:

- Always Being Right: "We are continually on trial to prove that our opinions and actions are correct. Being wrong is unthinkable and we will go to any length to demonstrate our rightness. For example, 'I don't care how badly arguing with me makes you feel, I'm going to win this argument no matter what because I'm right.' Being right often is more important than the feelings of others around a person who engages in this cognitive distortion, even loved ones."
- Heaven's Reward Fallacy: "We expect our sacrifice and self-denial to pay off, as if someone is keeping score. We feel bitter when the reward doesn't come."

==== Awfulizing and Must-ing ====
Rational emotive behavior therapy (REBT) includes awfulizing, when a person causes themselves disturbance by labeling an upcoming situation as "awful", rather than envisaging how the situation may actually unfold, and Must-ing, when a person places a false demand on themselves that something "must" happen (e.g. "I must get an A in this exam.")

== Application ==
=== Depression ===
According to Beck's theory of the etiology of depression, depressed people acquire a negative schema of the world in childhood and adolescence; children and adolescents who experience depression acquire this negative schema earlier. Depressed people acquire such schemas through the loss of a parent, rejection by peers, bullying, criticism from teachers or parents, the depressive attitude of a parent or other negative events. When a person with such schemas encounters a situation that resembles the original conditions of the learned schema, the negative schemas are activated.

Beck's negative triad holds that depressed people have negative thoughts about themselves, their experiences in the world, and the future. For instance, a depressed person might think, "I didn't get the job because I'm terrible at interviews. Interviewers never like me, and no one will ever want to hire me." In the same situation, a person who is not depressed might think, "The interviewer wasn't paying much attention to me. Maybe she already had someone else in mind for the job. Next time I'll have better luck, and I'll get a job soon." Beck also identified a number of other cognitive distortions, which can contribute to depression, including the following: arbitrary inference, selective abstraction, overgeneralization, magnification and minimization.

In 2008, Beck proposed an integrative developmental model of depression that aims to incorporate research in genetics and the neuroscience of depression. This model was updated in 2016 to incorporate multiple levels of analyses, new research, and key concepts (e.g., resilience) within the framework of an evolutionary perspective.

=== Other applications ===
Cognitive therapy has been applied to a very wide range of behavioral health issues including:

- Academic achievement
- Addiction
- Anxiety disorders
- Bipolar disorder
- Low self-esteem
- Phobia
- Schizophrenia
- Substance abuse
- Suicidal ideation
- Weight loss

== See also ==
- Cognitive analytic therapy
- Cognitive bias mitigation
- Cognitive-shifting
- David D. Burns
- Debiasing
- History of psychotherapy
- Journal of Cognitive Psychotherapy
- Recognition-primed decision
- Schema therapy
