= Selective abstraction =

In clinical psychology, selective abstraction is a type of cognitive bias or cognitive distortion in which a detail is taken out of context and believed whilst everything else in the context is ignored. It commonly appears in Aaron T. Beck's work in cognitive therapy. Another definition is: "focusing on only the negative aspects of an event, such as, 'I ruined the whole recital because of that one mistake'".

== Effects ==
A team of researchers analyzed the association between cognitive errors in youths with anxiety disorders by using the Children's Negative Cognitive Error Questionnaire (CNCEQ) and "several other self-reporting measures" (Children's Depression Inventory, Childhood Anxiety Sensitivity Index, Revised Children's Manifest Anxiety Scale, and the State-Trait Anxiety Inventory for Children-Trait Version). By assessing the CNCEQ, the researchers found that selective abstraction was related to both child depression and "measures of anxiety (i.e., trait anxiety, manifest anxiety, and anxiety sensitivity)".

One study noted that "some consistent findings have emerged with respect to the presence of specific cognitive errors in anxiety versus depression. 'Selective abstraction' is more commonly associated with depression than with anxiety".
