= Guilford Press =

Publisher in New York, United States

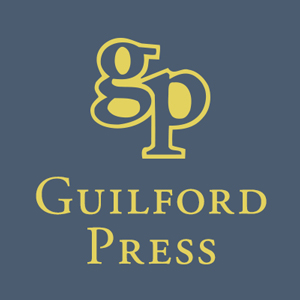
- Guilford Press Logo
- Status: Active
- Founded: 1973
- Founder: Bob Matloff and Seymour Weingarten
- Country of origin: United States
- Headquarters location: New York City
- Distribution: Worldwide
- Key people: Seymour Weingarten (Co-Founder); Tim Stookesberry (CEO); Laurie Rosatone (Editor-in-Chief)
- Publication types: Books, periodicals, and digital content for professional, scholarly and general audiences.
- Nonfiction topics: Mental health, psychology, elementary and secondary education, research methods, geography.
- No. of employees: 81
- Official website: Official website

Guilford Press or Guilford Publications, Inc. is a New York City-based independent publisher founded in 1973 that specializes in publishing books, journals, and digital content in psychology, psychiatry, the behavioral sciences, education, geography, and research methods.

== Overview ==
Guilford was founded by Bob Matloff and Seymour Weingarten. Matloff retired as president in 2022. The firm is run by Weingarten (co-founder and editor-at-large) and Tim Stookesberry (chief executive officer). In 2025, Weingarten received the Distinguished Friend to Behavior Therapy Award from the Association for Behavioral and Cognitive Therapies.

Guilford Press has over 1,300 titles in print, typically publishes more than 55–65 new books in print and e-book formats each year, and also publishes 10 journals.

In the academic sphere, Guilford Publications has published books by Aaron T. Beck, the cognitive therapist; Marsha Linehan, the developer of dialectical behavior therapy (DBT); and the founders of motivational interviewing, Stephen Rollnick and William R. Miller. Overcoming Binge Eating, Second Edition, by Christopher G. Fairburn, and Mind Over Mood by Dennis Greenberger and Christine A. Padesky, have been included in the United Kingdom Reading Well Books on Prescription program, a selective list of self-help books that general practitioners, counselors, and community mental health specialists are encouraged to "prescribe" for patients with mild to moderate mental health concerns. Mind Over Mood was also voted by the British Association of Behavioural and Cognitive Therapies as "the most influential cognitive behavioural therapy publication" and was recommended by Scientific American Mind.

It also publishes books in the field of literacy education, by authors including G. Michael Pressley and Susan B. Neuman. Guilford's authors and editors include 13 past presidents of the International Literacy Association, 49 members of the Reading Hall of Fame, and 14 winners of the Oscar S. Causey Award for lifetime contributions to literacy research from the Literacy Research Association.

Guilford exhibits at numerous professional conferences each year, including those held by the American Academy of Child and Adolescent Psychiatry, the American Educational Research Association, the American Psychological Association, the Association for Behavioral and Cognitive Therapies, the Literacy Research Association, the International Neuropsychological Society, and the National Association of School Psychologists.

== Authors ==
Guilford's authors include:

- Russell A. Barkley
- David H. Barlow
- Donald H. Baucom
- Aaron T. Beck
- Judith S. Beck
- Geraldine Dawson
- Edward L. Deci
- Christopher Fairburn
- Robert D. Hare
- Steven C. Hayes
- David A. Jobes
- Susan M. Johnson
- Jon Kabat-Zinn
- Robert L. Leahy
- Jay L. Lebow
- Marsha Linehan
- Todd D. Little
- Cathy A. Malchiodi
- Nancy McWilliams
- William R. Miller
- Kristin Neff
- Susan B. Neuman
- John C. Norcross
- Patricia Resick
- Stephen Rollnick
- Richard M. Ryan
- Richard C. Schwartz
- Zindel Segal
- Francine Shapiro
- Daniel J. Siegel
- John D. Teasdale
- J. Mark G. Williams
