= Tamara Sher =

Tamara Goldman Sher
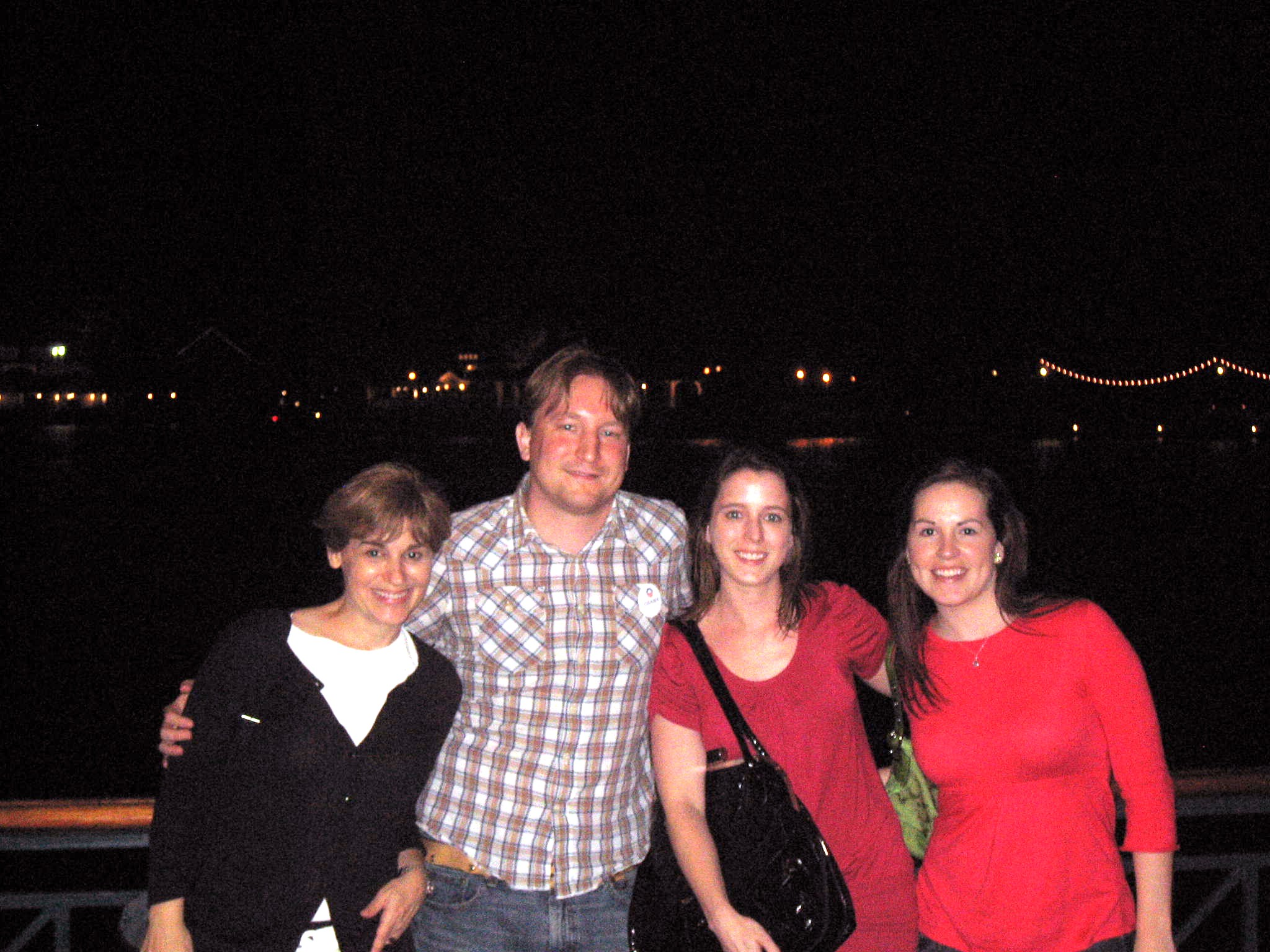
- Sher (left) with three of her graduate students
- Born: November 9, 1962 (age 63); Glencoe, Illinois
- Education: University of Michigan, (A.B.) 1984, University of North Carolina at Chapel Hill, (Ph.D.) 1989
- Known for: her research in Behavioral Medicine, and Couples Therapy
- Scientific career
- Fields: Psychologist
- Workplaces: The Family Institute at Northwestern University; NIH Behavior Change Consortium
- Doctoral advisor: Donald H. Baucom

Tamara Goldman Sher, Ph.D. (November 9, 1962) is a licensed clinical psychologist and professor at The Family Institute at Northwestern University. She is a leading researcher in the fields of Behavioral Medicine (Health Psychology) and Couples Therapy. Sher was awarded a $2.4 million grant from the National Heart, Lung and Blood Institute of the National Institutes of Health (NIH) which combined both of these fields in a study measuring the benefits of couples' involvement in cardiac treatment. This grant is part of Sher's work with the National Institute of Health's Behavior Change Consortium. Sher's research has been mentioned in the Chicago Tribune, Psychology Today, on Chicago Public Radio, and published in several leading psychology journals.

== Biography ==
Tamara Goldman Sher is a native of Chicago's suburbs who lives with her husband and two daughters in suburban Cook County. She is the sister of Abigail Helaine Goldman, Pulitzer Prize–winning journalist for the LA Times, and Josh Goldman, an entrepreneur, investor, and venture capitalist who is currently a partner at Norwest Venture Partners in Palo Alto, California.

Sher earned her PhD in clinical psychology from the University of North Carolina at Chapel Hill (1989) and B.A. from the University of Michigan (1984). After completing her internship training at Rush University Medical Center she spent seven years on medical school faculty where she became head of the health psychology track of the internship program and director of the Couples and Health program. In 1994, Dr. Sher moved to the College of Psychology at Illinois Institute of Technology (IIT), where she taught for 17 years. In 2007 she became director of clinical training for the College of Psychology. In 2011, Sher left IIT as a full professor to join The Family Institute at Northwestern University as their vice president for research.

In 2000, Sher co-authored (with K. B. Schmaling) a textbook entitled "The Psychology of Couples and Illness." She belongs to several professional societies including the American Psychological Association (APA), the Association for Behavioral and Cognitive Therapies (ABCT), and the Society of Behavioral Medicine (SBM). Sher is regularly invited as a symposium discussant and presentation author to each of these professional societies annual conferences. In addition, she is on the editorial board of the APA Journal of Family Psychology, a member of the National Institute of Health's Behavior Change Consortium, and sits on the Clinical Oversight Committee for the Cancer Wellness Center.

== Research description ==
The goal of Sher's NIH grant was to determine if improvement in a couple's interpersonal relationship would result in sustained changes in health behavior, improvement in the couple's quality of life, and health benefits specific to the cardiac patient. Working out of labs at both the Illinois Institute of Technology and Rush University Hospital, Sher's team recruited 160 participants (approximately 35% minorities, 30% women) in which one member suffered from a cardiovascular event (e.g., myocardial infarction, bypass graft surgery, angioplasty). Using a short term couples intervention strategy designed to optimize relationships and reduce interpersonal stress, the team focused on three areas of change: exercise, weight management, and compliance with lipid-lowering medication. These areas were targeted because of the difficulty many cardiac patients face in maintaining long-term commitments to change.

Currently, Sher is interested in applying what she has learned from previous work to a much wider population of patients through the use of the Internet and telephone. She is particularly interested in reaching patients who do not have the time or resources to participate in intensive out-patient groups.

== Interviews ==
- Sher (February 2004). "Family pressure to eat: after I lost 30 pounds, my family pushed me to gain them back. How can I lose weight and still maintain a strong connection? … and more of your questions answered here - mind body q+a". Shape (magazine). 23 (2). Archived from the original on October 24, 2004 – via FindArticles.
- Chicago Public Radio program 848 Sher discusses her NIH funded study (date: February 14, 2001)
- Chicago Tribune Sher discusses her NIH funded study for the Chicago Tribune
- Psychology Today Sher discusses difficulties in doctor/patient communication based on her research findings

== Selected works and publications ==
Books

- Osterman, G. P.; Sher, T. G.; Hales, G.; Canar, W. J.; Singla, R.; & Tilton, T. (2003). Physical Illness. In D. K. Snider & M. A. Whisman (Eds.), Treating Difficult Couples: Helping Clients with Coexisting Mental and Relationship Disorders (pp. 350–369). New York, NY: Guilford Press.
- Schmaling, K.B. & Sher, T.G. (Eds.) (2000). The Psychology of Couples and Illness: Theory, research, & practice.. Washington, DC: American Psychological Association Books.
- Schmaling, K.B. & Sher, T.G. (1997). Physical health and relationships. In W. K. Halford & H. J. Markman (Eds.), Clinical handbook of marriage and couples interventions (pp. 323–345). Hoboken, NJ: Wiley.
- Sher, T. G. (1996). Courtship and marriage: Choosing a primary relationship. In N. Vanzetti & S. Duck (Eds.), A lifetime of relationships (pp. 243–264). Belmont, CA: Thomson Brooks/Cole Publishing.
- Sher, Tamara G.; Baucom, Donald H. (1987). "Application of marital research and methodology to the study of the family". In Hahlweg, Kurt; Goldstein, Michael J. (eds.). Understanding major mental disorder: The contribution of family interaction research. NY: Family Process Press. pp. 290–313. ISBN 978-0-9615519-4-0.

Educational Videos

- Couples and Illness with Tamara Goldman Sher, PhD

Academic Journals

- Davis, Rachel; et al. (2008). "Use of Signal Detection Methodology to Identify Subgroups of Dietary Supplement Use in Diverse Populations". Journal of Nutrition. 138 (1): 205S–211S. doi:10.1093/jn/138.1.205S. PMID 18156426.
- Sher, T.G.; Halford, W.K. (2008). "Challenges and opportunities in public health perspectives on family interventions: introduction to the special section". Journal of Family Psychology. 22 (4): 495–6. doi:10.1037/a0012552. PMID 18729663.
- Yaroch, Amy; et al. (2008). "Baseline Design Elements and Sample Characteristics for Seven Sites Participating in the Nutrition Working Group of the Behavior Change Consortium". Journal of Nutrition. 138 (1): 185S–192S. doi:10.1093/jn/138.1.185S. PMID 18156423.
- Greene, Geoffrey; et al. (2008). "Correspondence of the NCI Fruit and Vegetable Screener to Repeat 24-H Recalls and Serum Carotenoids in Behavioral Intervention Trials". Journal of Nutrition. 138 (1): 200S–204S. doi:10.1093/jn/138.1.200S. PMID 18156425.
- Baucom, Brian; Eldridge, Kathleen; Jones, Janice; Sevier, Mia; Clements, Mari; Markman, Howard; Stanley, Scott; Sayers, Steven; Sher, Tamara (2007). "Relative contributions of relationship distress and depression to communication patterns in couples". Journal of Social and Clinical Psychology. 26 (6): 689–707. doi:10.1521/jscp.2007.26.6.689. PMC 2663941. PMID 19343103.
- Epstein, Alyssa; Sher, Tamara; Young, Michael; King, Andrea (2006). "Tobacco chippers show robust increases in smoking urge after alcohol consumption". Psychopharmacology. 190 (3): 321–9. doi:10.1007/s00213-006-0438-8. PMID 16804691. S2CID 20263253.
- Greene, G.W.; Nebeling, L.C.; Greaney, M.L.; Lindsay, A.C.; Hardwick, C.K.; Toobert, D.J.; Resnicow, K.; Williams, G.C.; Elliot, D.L. (2007). "A Qualitative Study of a Nutrition Working Group". Health Promotion Practice. 8 (3): 299–306. doi:10.1177/1524839906292587. PMID 17522413. S2CID 24871524.
- Coday, Mace; Boutin-foster, Carla; Sher, Tamara; Tennant, Jennifer; Greaney, Mary; Saunders, Sandra; Somes, Grant (2005). "Strategies for retaining study participants in behavioral intervention trials: Retention experiences of the nih behavior change consortium". Annals of Behavioral Medicine. 29 (2): 55–65. doi:10.1207/s15324796abm2902s_9. PMID 15921490. S2CID 3676180.
- Jordan, Patricia; Ory, Marcia; Sher, Tamara (2005). "Yours, Mine, and Ours: The Importance of Scientific Collaboration in Advancing the Field of Behavior Change Research". Annals of Behavioral Medicine. 29 (2): 7–10. doi:10.1207/s15324796abm2902s_3. PMID 15921484. S2CID 3689509.
- Tamara Goldman Sher and Donald H. Baucom (2001). "Mending a broken heart: A couples approach to cardiac risk reduction". Applied and Preventive Psychology. 10 (2): 125–133.
- Gold-spink, Eric; Sher, Tamara.; Theodos, Violet (2000). "Uncertainty in Illness and Optimism in Couples with Multiple Sclerosis". International Journal of Rehabilitation and Health. 5 (3): 157–164. doi:10.1023/A:1012995104468. S2CID 141229545.
- Levin, J.; Goldman, Tamara (2000). "Psychological treatment of couples undergoing fertility treatment". Cognitive and Behavioral Practice. 7 (2): 207. doi:10.1016/S1077-7229(00)80033-4.
- Goldman, Tamara (2000). "Introduction". Cognitive and Behavioral Practice. 7 (2): 206–207. doi:10.1016/S1077-7229(00)80032-2.
- Levin, Jennifer; Sher, Tamara; Theodos, Violet (1997). "The Effect of Intracouple Coping Concordance on Psychological and Marital Distress in Infertility Patients". Journal of Clinical Psychology in Medical Settings. 4 (4): 361–372. doi:10.1023/A:1026249317635. S2CID 40817582.
- Sher, T. G.; Cella, D.; Leslie, W. T.; Bonomi, P.; Taylor IV, S. G; Serafian, B. (1997). "Communication Differences Between Physicians and Their Patients in an Oncology Setting". Journal of Clinical Psychology in Medical Settings. 04 (3): 281–293. doi:10.1023/A:1026285315454. S2CID 19973187.
- Sher, T. G.; Schmaling, K. B. (1997). "Intimate Relationships and Health: Research and Practice". Journal of Clinical Psychology in Medical Settings. 04 (4): 359–360. doi:10.1023/A:1026232100797. S2CID 34394994.
- Sher, T. G.; Baucom, D. H. (1993). "Marital communication: Differences among maritally distressed, depressed, and nondistressed-nondepressed couples". Journal of Family Psychology. 7 (1): 148–153. doi:10.1037/0893-3200.7.1.148.
- Sayers, S. L.; Baucom, D. H.; Sher, T. G.; Weiss, R. L.; et al. (1991). Behavioral Assessment. 13 (1): 25–49.
- Sher, T. G.; Weiss, R. L. (1991). "Negativity in marital communication: Where's the beef?". Behavioral Assessment. 13 (1): 1–5.
- Baucom, D.H.; Sayers, S.L.; Sher, T.G. (1990). "Supplementing behavioral marital therapy with cognitive restructuring and emotional expressiveness training: an outcome investigation". Journal of Consulting and Clinical Psychology. 58 (5): 636–45. doi:10.1037/0022-006X.58.5.636. PMID 2254512.
- Sher, T. G.; Baucom, D. H.; Larus, J. M. (1990). "Communication patterns and response to treatment among depressed and nondepressed maritally distressed couples". Journal of Family Psychology. 4 (1): 63–79. doi:10.1037/0893-3200.4.1.63.
- Baucom, D.H.; Epstein, N.; Sayers, S.; Sher, T.G. (1989). "The role of cognitions in marital relationships: definitional, methodological, and conceptual issues". Journal of Consulting and Clinical Psychology. 57 (1): 31–8. doi:10.1037/0022-006X.57.1.31. PMID 2647801.
