= Gary M. Burlingame =

American psychologist

Gary M. Burlingame is an American psychologist, Professor of Psychology at Brigham Young University in Utah. His work in psychotherapy led to the development of Routine Outcome Monitoring (ROM—sometimes designated Routine Outcome Measures). With his colleague Michael J. Lambert he co-created Outcome Questionnaire 45, a 45-item multiple-choice self-report inventory used to measure psychotherapy progress in adult patients throughout therapy and following termination.

== Education ==
Burlingame earned his B.S. in psychology with a minor in history from Andrews University in Berrien Springs, Michigan in 1978. He went on to earn an M.S. and a Ph.D. in Counseling Psychology from the University of Utah, Salt Lake City, Utah in 1981 and 1983, respectfully.

== Career ==
He was appointed assistant professor at the Brigham Young University Department of Psychology in 1983, and was promoted to associate professor in 1989 and full Professor in 1996. He has served as its chair from 2018 to the present.

He has been a licensed Psychologist by the State of Utah since 1984.

Burlingame is a member of the American Psychological Association, Division 49. He served on the Research Committee from 1992 to 1997 and served as its chair from 1996 to 1997. He also served as the group's president from 2010 to 2011. In 2019 he was chosen President-elect of the American Group Psychotherapy Association.

== Recognition ==
- President: APA Group Psychology & Psychotherapy Division (2009-2011)
- Wells & Myrle Cloward Teaching & Learning Fellowship—BYU (2007-2010)
- Adolf-Ernst-Meyer-Award for Psychotherapy Research; German College of Psychosomatic Medicine (2007)
- Group Psychologist of the Year, American Psychological Association (2006)
- Centennial Global Service Award, Loma Linda University (2006)
- Outstanding Contributions to Group Psychotherapy – American Group Psychotherapy Association (2003)
- Fellow, American Psychological Association (2000)

== Publications ==
- Lambert MJ, Burlingame GM, Umphress V, Hansen NB, Vermeersch DA, Clouse GC, Yanchar SC. The reliability and validity of the Outcome Questionnaire. Clinical Psychology & Psychotherapy: An International Journal of Theory and Practice. 1996 Dec;3(4):249-58.
- Burlingame GM, Fuhriman A, Johnson JE. Cohesion in group psychotherapy. Psychotherapy: Theory, Research, Practice, Training. 2001;38(4):373.
- Burlingame GM, Fuhriman A, Mosier J. The differential effectiveness of group psychotherapy: A meta-analytic perspective. Theory. 2003 Mar;7(1):3
- McRoberts C, Burlingame GM, Hoag MJ. Comparative efficacy of individual and group psychotherapy: A meta-analytic perspective. Group Dynamics: Theory, Research, and Practice. 1998 Jun;2(2):101
- Burlingame GM, McClendon DT, Alonso J. Cohesion in group therapy. Psychotherapy. 2011 Mar;48(1):34
