= The Beck Diet Solution =

Book by Judith S. Beck

The Beck Diet Solution, authored by Judith S. Beck, uses cognitive and behavioral techniques to teach dieters how to lose weight and continually motivate themselves to maintain their weight loss. It is one of the first books to apply Cognitive Therapy techniques to dieting and permanent weight loss.

== Overview ==
Based on the premise that many dieters are able to make short term changes in their behavior, but then end up gaining weight back, The Beck Diet Solution teaches dieters to change their thinking so that they can change their behavior for the long term. By following the Cognitive Therapy techniques, dieters learn to: think differently and overcome common dieting pitfalls and sabotaging thoughts; eat favorite foods while steadily losing weight, feel in control in the most challenging situations; feel confident in their ability to follow a healthy diet and exercise plan; remain motivated to maintain weight loss for life. Dr. Beck utilizes tools such as hunger monitoring scales, daily planning schedules, weight loss graphs, and motivational cards to facilitate the process.

== Writers ==
The foreword of the book was written by Beck's father, Aaron T. Beck, who is widely regarded as the father of cognitive therapy.

Beck is the President of Beck Institute for Cognitive Behavior Therapy and is internationally renowned in the field of Cognitive Behavior Therapy. She wrote the basic textbook, Cognitive Behavior Therapy: Basics and Beyond (2nd edition), which has been translated into 20 languages.

Beck also published The Beck Diet Solution Weight Loss Workbook, the Complete Beck Diet for Life, and The Diet Trap Solution which can be used alone or along with The Beck Diet Solution.
