= PSYCHLOPS =

- Purpose: measure mental health outcome

PSYCHLOPS (psychological outcome profiles) is a type of psychological testing, a tool used in primary care to measure mental health outcomes and as a quality of life measure.

It is also one intervention that has been adapted for use in children and adopted by the World Health Organization (WHO) in response to a demand for guidance on psychological interventions for people exposed to adversity, including humanitarian disasters.

== Use in mental health care ==
PSYCHLOPS is a mental health outcome-measure tool used in primary care or community care settings and is self-completed. It measures mental health problems, quality of life, social functioning and wellbeing. Others include the Beck Depression Inventory, the CORE-OM, Generalized Anxiety Disorder 7 (GAD-7) and the Patient Health Questionnaire (PHQ-9), amongst others.

By comparing scores before, during and after completion of talking therapy, the measure enables calculation of a change score. The change score indicates the change (improvement or deterioration) in perceived severity of problems during and following a course of talking therapy. PSYCHLOPS is a patient-generated outcome measure which means that measurement is based on items (issues) selected by patients rather than pre-specified items. By gathering information on patient-generated items, PSYCHLOPS contains a free text record (qualitative data) of the patient's own perception of their problems which can be used for qualitative research.

=== WHO ===
It is also one intervention that has been adopted by the WHO in response to a demand for guidance on psychological interventions for people exposed to adversity. This includes people caught up in humanitarian crises and incorporates common mental health problems in a variety of countries, cultures and settings. WHO has included it in two of their mental health programmes, Programme Management Plus (PM+) and Self Help Plus (SH+), both of which use locally trained mental health workers to administer mental health support in countries affected by conflict and war.

=== Children ===
PSYCHLOPS has been adapted for use in children. Unlike a checklist, "PSYCHLOPS Kids" allows children to identify their worries themselves. For children taking part in drama therapy, they have the potential to recognise the impact of their therapy. The reliance on the support of school staff has been reported as one limitation.

== Procedure ==
PSYCHLOPS is completed by the individual person. A specific sequence of questions is included in the questionnaire which address the respondent's greatest and least worries. These concerns are then scored. Subsequently, the answers and scores can be used to evaluate their perception of the change in their problems as a result of counselling or other talking therapy. It uses a six-point scale rather than the seven used in its sister questionnaire, MYMOP.

The procedure encompasses answering four questions on one sheet, with the first question being "Choose the problem that troubles you most?" This is followed by scoring it on a six-point scoring range and recording the duration of the problem. An outcome score is calculated using the scores of each of the before, during and after questionnaires.

== History ==
PSYCHLOPS was designed by a group led by Mark Ashworth, a British academic general practitioner, and designed by Jeremy Christey. This work was inspired by the self-report inventory, MYMOP (Measure Yourself Medical Outcome Profile), another outcome measure first published in 1996 and mainly used for people who present with physical, emotional, or social symptoms. This measure brings important understanding from psychotherapy research to measure what is important to individuals themselves, to help them track and manage their self-defined difficulties.

The PSYCHLOPS measure looks at a trans-therapeutic approach to measurement, that includes the ideas that we manage our difficulties through three different phases

These three stages are re-moralisation (wellbeing, where mood lifts). Remediation (where problems get better) and rehabilitation (where functioning, the causes of problems are improved). The PSYCHLOPS measure is designed to focus on these stages and phases in measuring mental health from a client-centred perspective.

== Research ==
There has been debate as to whether to identify and measure individualized outcomes that are unique for each patient (idiographic approach) or to use standardized measures (nomothetic approach). Both measures have their advantages and disadvantages.

As a patient-generated measure, PSYCHLOPS appears a more sensitive (responsive) measure of change following a mental health intervention than some other standardised measures.
