= Interpersonal Cognitive Behavioral Therapy =

Branch of psychotherapy

Interpersonal Cognitive Behavioral Therapy (I-CBT) is a branch of cognitive behavioral therapy (CBT) that is mainly used to treat anxiety, depression, attention-deficit hyperactivity disorder (ADHD), obsessive compulsive disorder (OCD), post traumatic stress disorder (PTSD), and autism spectrum disorder. It was developed by Thomas Cordier of Glastonbury Connecticut, USA (An Introduction to The Interpersonal Cognitive Behavioral Therapy Treatment System: A 21st Century Recipe for Mental Health Treatment Success, T.A. Cordier, 2016).

== Description ==
I-CBT seeks to help patients overcome their psychiatric/mental health problems by teaching them — through the utilization of emotional intelligence (EI) — to dismiss irrational thoughts by helping them to understand and define their emotional states. Emotional intelligence is thought to be a better indicator for success than intelligence quotient (IQ) test scores.

=== Core beliefs ===
Clients are also taught to challenge negative core beliefs by challenging assumptions based on these beliefs. The treatment system focuses on the relationship between the patient and provider as a primary source for the patient's improvement. I-CBT also draws on other proven treatment modalities, (e.g., psychodynamic principals and group therapy) and utilizes mindfulness, yoga, art therapy, and social skills training to help behaviorally challenged adolescents and adults find calmness. I-CBT is a structured treatment approach based on a workbook/manual that can be tailored for an individual patient's needs. The program also utilizes the Beck Depression Inventory (BDI), the Beck Anxiety Inventory (BAI), and the Beck Youth Inventory (BYI) to help track clients progress, and ensure an effective treatment program.

=== Family ===
I-CBT also focuses on treating the family unit as a whole, by including mandatory behavioral parent training (BPT), to teach good parenting skills, and how to encourage positive behavior/thinking — while discouraging negative behavior/thinking.
