= Beck Hopelessness Scale =

Psychological test

- Purpose: measures suicidal tendency

The Beck Hopelessness Scale (BHS) is a 20-item self-report inventory developed by Dr. Aaron T. Beck that was designed to measure three major aspects of hopelessness: feelings about the future, loss of motivation, and expectations. It is a true-false test is designed for adults age 17–80. It measures the extent of the respondent's negative attitudes, or pessimism, about the future. It may be used as an indicator of suicidal risk in depressed people who have made suicide attempts. It is not designed for use as a measure of the hopelessness construct but has been used as such. Sufficient data about the use of the test with those younger than 17 has not been collected. It may be administered and scored by paraprofessionals, but must be used and interpreted only by clinically trained professionals, who can employ psychotherapeutic interventions. Norms are available for suicidal patients, depressed patients, and drug abusers.

== Reliability and validity ==
The BHS moderately correlates with the Beck Depression Inventory, although research shows that the BDI is better suited for predicting suicidal ideation behavior. The internal reliability coefficients are reasonably high (Pearson r = 0.82 to 0.93 in seven norm groups), but the BHS test-retest reliability coefficients are modest (0.69 after one week and 0.66 after six weeks).

Dowd and Owen both positively reviewed the effectiveness of the instrument, with Dowd concluding that the BHS was "a well-constructed and validated instrument, with adequate reliability".

== DMCA notice ==
In 2012, the scale became the subject of a much circulated DMCA notice that resulted in the temporary shutdown of 1.45 million education blogs due to the scale's inclusion in a single blog several years prior to the incident, sparking widespread indignation. Beck Hopelessness Scale is sold as a product by Pearson, along with the Beck Anxiety Inventory (BAI) and the Beck Depression Inventory II (BDI-II).

== Questionnaire ==
The Beck Hopelessness Scale questionnaire consists of twenty true/false questions examining the respondent's attitude for the past week, such as:

- I might as well give up because there's nothing I can do to make things better for me
- I happen to be particularly lucky and I expect to get more of the good things in life than the average person
- I never get what I want, so it's foolish to want anything
- My past experiences have prepared me well for my future

== See also ==
- Aaron T. Beck
- Beck Depression Inventory
- Diagnostic classification and rating scales used in psychiatry
