= CORE-OM =

Psychological measurement

CORE-OM (Clinical Outcomes in Routine Evaluation-Outcome Measure) is a common self-report measure of global distress. It can be used as an initial screening tool and as an assessment tool of the response to psychological therapy.

== Description ==
CORE-OM has 34 items all answered on the same five level frequency scale asking about the respondent's state over the last week. It was originally designed and developed in response to a research funding call from the UK Mental Health Foundation which required that the content must cover domains of well-being, problems, functioning and risk. These were seen as content domains, not as cleanly separable latent variables or factors, it was never envisaged that such a broad set of issues would show any neat population structure that would emerge in factor analysis.

== Translations ==
Translations of CORE-OM have been completed into 30 languages and more underway (including Korean and Estonian). To be legal under the Creative Commons licence of the CORE instruments translations must be done with CORE System Trust and to their translation protocol. A 2021 paper gives a thorough account of working to the protocol to translate the YP-CORE into Arabic.

== Short forms and related instruments ==
There are approved CORE-OM short forms: two 18 item versions launched with the CORE-OM in 1998, the GP-CORE for general population survey work and the CORE-10. In addition the YP-CORE, a 10 item form for young people has been developed based on the CORE-OM, as have two forms for adults with mild to moderate learning difficulties.

== Similar instruments or systems and complementary measures ==
The CORE system philosophy was that the instruments, and practitioners and researchers should be free to use them as they saw fit: a "bottom up" philosophy rather than one of "top down" usage dictated by politics or health delivery systems. The copyleft status was intended to remove cost barriers to using the instruments while ensuring that they weren't mutated into many non-comparable forms.

When CORE was launched in 1998 it rapidly became clear that there were several similar initiatives including the Outcome Measures work, in which the Outcome Measure-45 Outcome Questionnaire 45 led by Professor Michael Lambert in the USA and, also from the US, the ORS/SRS system led by Scott D. Miller and his colleagues all of which share the idea of a central "core" or issues being evaluated. At the same time it was anticipated that such "core" measures would be complemented, particularly in research work, by problem specific measures, perhaps often too long, or too costly for routine service, e.g. the Beck depression Inventory.

== Health Economic (QALY) scoring ==
Work by Ifigenia Mavranezouli, then at the University of Sheffield focusing on health economic evaluation created the CORE-6D scoring of six items of the CORE-OM that converts their scores to a QALY (Quality Adjusted Life Year) score.

== Online completion and coronavirus pandemic ==
Responding to the COVID-19 pandemic CORE System trust have provided free fillable PDF forms, Microsoft Forms, Qualtrics and LimeSurvey templates. An attempt to provide Google Forms was abandoned when it proved impossible to ensure that practitioners copying the forms would follow the instructions carefully enough to ensure that they did not share data at the same time as sharing the forms. The Therapy Meets Numbers resource now offers COREbots as an online completion system.

One survey exploring the impact of the COVID-19 pandemic using the CORE-OM as a measure, looking at the impacts on university staff in Porto Alegre in Brazil has been published and further publications are expected from that work and from other work using the CORE-10 in Ecuador and the GP-CORE in Greece.
