= Ronald D. Siegel =

American clinical psychologist, author, and educator

- Born: March 10, 1954 (age 72); New York City, New York
- Citizenship: American
- Education: Rutgers University (PsyD) Wesleyan University (BA)
- Occupations: Clinical psychologist, author, educator
- Website: drronsiegel.com

Ronald Douglas Siegel is an American clinical psychologist, author, and educator known for his work in mindfulness and psychotherapy. He is an assistant professor of psychology at Harvard Medical School; has written and edited many books for professional and lay readers; developed self-treatment programs for chronic pain; and lectures on integrating mindfulness and compassion practices into clinical practice.

== Early life and education ==
Siegel was born on March 10, 1954, in New York City, completed a Bachelor of Arts (BA) in religion from Wesleyan University in 1975, and a Doctor of Psychology (PsyD) from Rutgers University in 1983.

== Career ==
Siegel worked at Cambridge Youth Guidance Center (CYGC) from 1983 to 2006.

In the mid-1980s, he joined Harvard Medical School, researching how meditative traditions could inform psychotherapeutic theory, research, and practice. In 1996, they created the Institute for Meditation and Psychotherapy, a ground breaking organization dedicated to integrating contemplative practices into psychotherapy, where he continues to serve as faculty and on the Board of Directors.

Siegel developed a chronic back pain treatment program following a personal experience with back pain in 1988.

In 2014, Siegel helped to establish the Center for Mindfulness and Compassion at the Cambridge Health Alliance/Harvard Medical School, dedicated to research, training, and community service, where he serves as a supervisor and senior faculty advisor; and from 2014 to 2025 served as an Adjunct Assistant Professor in the Department of Psychiatry at the University of Massachusetts Chan Medical School.

Siegel co-directs the annual Harvard Medical School conferences on Meditation, Psychotherapy, and Psychedelic-Assisted Psychotherapy. He has developed programs for clinicians to understand research into psychedelic-assisted psychotherapy and its potential impact on clinical practice.

Siegel has also produced lectures and writing for non-academic audiences.

Siegel has a clinical practice in Lincoln, Massachusetts.

== Selected publications ==
- Siegel, Ronald D.; Germer, Christopher K.; Olendzki, Andrew (2009). "Mindfulness: What Is It? Where Did It Come From?". In Didonna, Fabrizio (ed.). Clinical Handbook of Mindfulness. New York, NY: Springer New York. pp. 17–35. doi:10.1007/978-0-387-09593-6_2. ISBN 978-0-387-09592-9.
- Siegel, Ronald D. (2010). The mindfulness solution: everyday practices for everyday problems. New York: Guilford Press. ISBN 978-1-60623-294-1.
- Fulton, Paul R.; Germer, Christopher K.; Siegel, Ronald Douglas (2016). Mindfulness and psychotherapy (2nd ed.). New York: Guilford Press. ISBN 978-1-4625-2837-0.
- Germer, Christopher K.; Siegel, Ronald Douglas (2012). Wisdom and compassion in psychotherapy: deepening mindfulness in clinical practice. New York: Guilford Press. ISBN 978-1-4625-1886-9.
