= Aaron Beck =

American psychiatrist and academic (1921–2021)

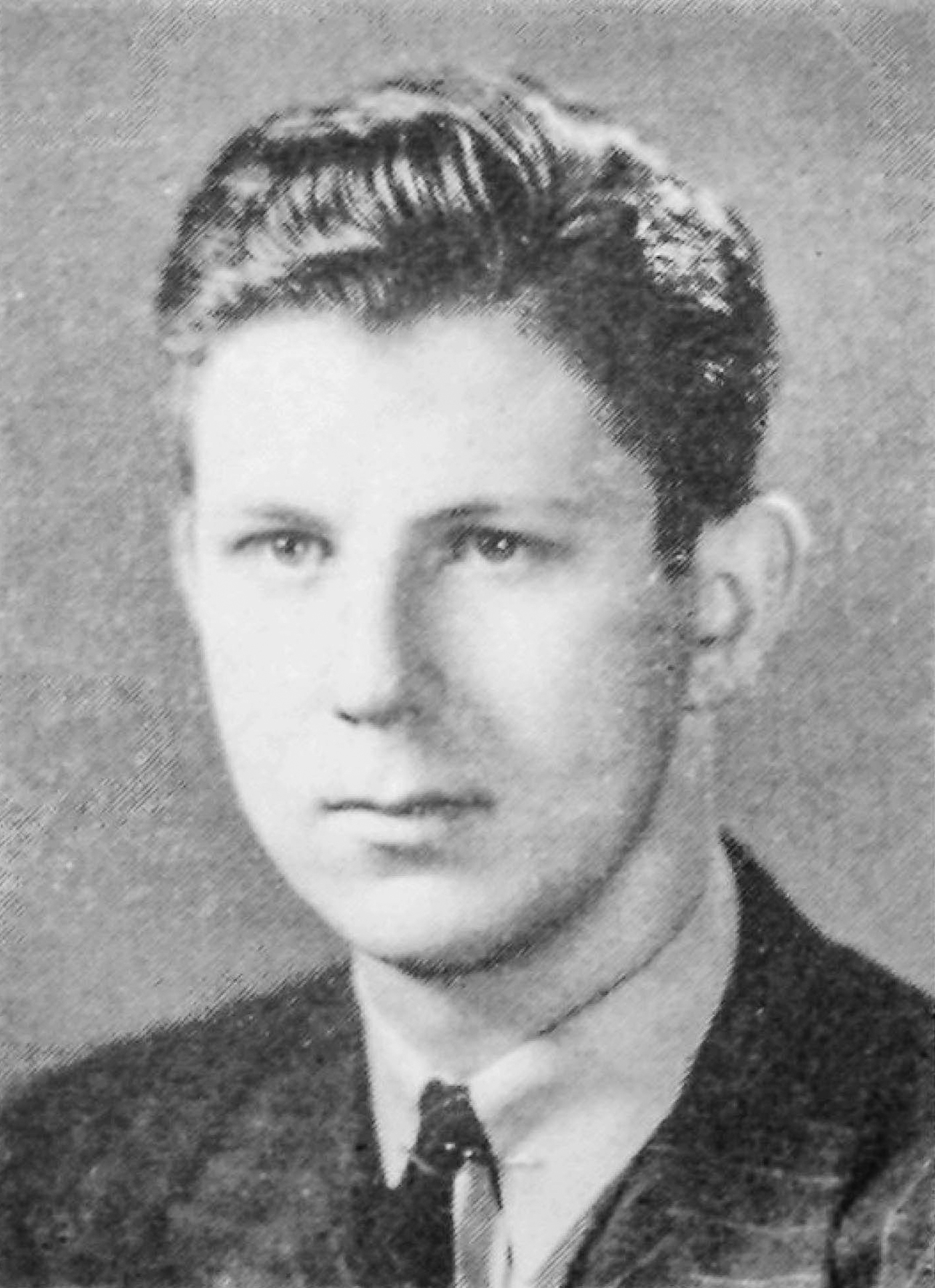
- Beck in 1942
- Born: Aaron Temkin Beck; July 18, 1921; Providence, Rhode Island, U.S.
- Died: November 1, 2021 (aged 100); Philadelphia, Pennsylvania, U.S.
- Education: Brown University (AB); Yale University (MD)
- Known for: Beck Depression Inventory
- Spouse: Phyllis W. Beck (m. 1950)
- Children: 4, including Judith
- Awards: See list
- Scientific career
- Fields: Psychiatry
- Workplaces: University of Pennsylvania; Beck Institute for Cognitive Behavior Therapy
- Doctoral students: Steven D. Hollon; Jeffrey Young; Gregg R. Henriques

Aaron Temkin Beck (July 18, 1921 – November 1, 2021) was an American psychiatrist who was a professor in the department of psychiatry at the University of Pennsylvania. He is regarded as the father of cognitive therapy and cognitive behavioral therapy (CBT). His pioneering methods are widely used in the treatment of clinical depression and various anxiety disorders. Beck also developed self-report measures for depression and anxiety, notably the Beck Depression Inventory (BDI), which became one of the most widely used instruments for measuring the severity of depression. In 1994 he and his daughter, psychologist Judith S. Beck, founded the nonprofit Beck Institute for Cognitive Behavior Therapy, which provides CBT treatment and training, as well as research. Beck served as President Emeritus of the organization up until his death.

Beck was noted for his writings on psychotherapy, psychopathology, suicide, and psychometrics. He published more than 600 professional journal articles, and authored or co-authored 25 books. He was named one of the "Americans in history who shaped the face of American psychiatry", and one of the "five most influential psychotherapists of all time" by The American Psychologist in July 1989.

== Early life and education ==
Aaron Temkin Beck was born in Providence, Rhode Island, on July 18, 1921. He was the youngest of four children born to Elizabeth Temkin and Harry Beck, Jewish immigrants from Ukraine. Harry worked as a printer and Elizabeth's family found financial success in tobacco wholesaling; the family belonged to the upwardly-mobile vanguard of Providence's Eastern European-Jewish immigrant community. At the time of Aaron's birth, the Temkin-Becks lived a "comfortable, lower-middle class lifestyle" and were in the process of putting down roots on Providence's East Side. In 1923, when Aaron was two years old, the family purchased a house at 43/41 Sessions Street in the city's Blackstone neighborhood.

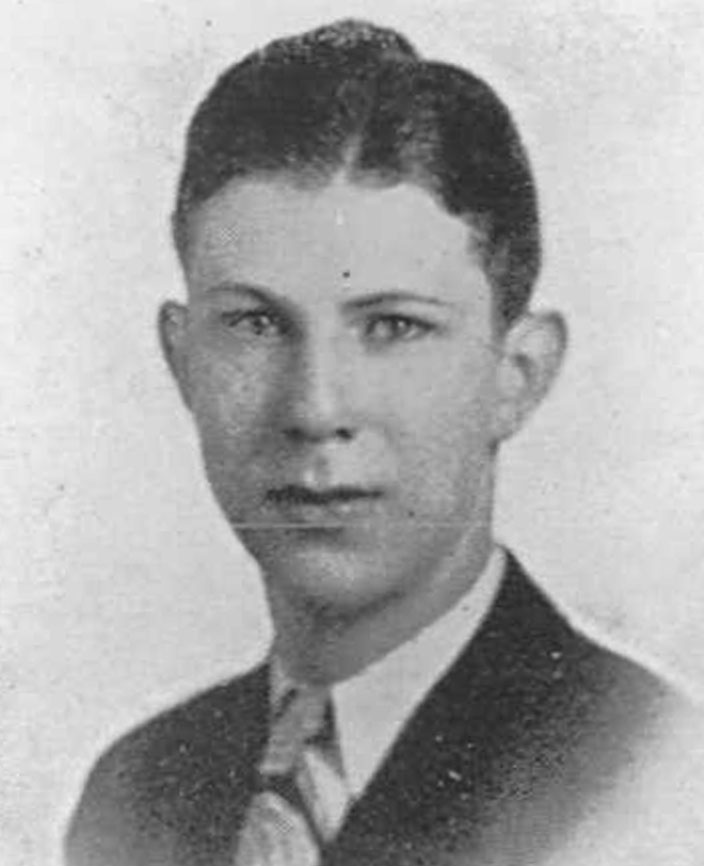
Beck's Hope High School yearbook photograph

Beck attended John Howland Grammar School, Nathan Bishop Junior High, and Hope Street High School, where he graduated as valedictorian in 1938. As an adolescent, Beck dreamed of becoming a journalist. Beck matriculated at Brown University, where he graduated magna cum laude in 1942. At Brown, he was elected a member of Phi Beta Kappa society, was an associate editor of The Brown Daily Herald, and received the Francis Wayland Scholarship, William Gaston Prize for Excellence in Oratory, and Philo Sherman Bennett Essay Award. Beck attended Yale Medical School, planning to become an internist and work in private practice in Providence. He graduated from Yale with a Doctor of Medicine in 1946.

== Career ==
After receiving his M.D., Beck completed a six-month junior residency in pathology at Rhode Island Hospital and a three-year residency in neurology at Cushing Veterans Administration Hospital in Framingham, Massachusetts. During this time, Beck began to specialize in neurology, reportedly liking the precision of its procedures. However, due to a shortage of psychiatry residents, he was instructed to do a six-month rotation in that field, and he became absorbed in psychoanalysis, despite initial wariness.

After completing his medical internships and residencies from 1946 to 1950, Beck became a fellow in psychiatry at the Austen Riggs Center, a private mental hospital in the mountains of Stockbridge, Massachusetts, until 1952. At that time, it was a center of ego psychology with an unusual degree of collaboration between psychiatrists and psychologists, including David Rapaport.

Beck then completed military service as assistant chief of neuropsychiatry at Valley Forge Army Hospital in the United States Military.

=== Penn psychiatry ===
Beck then joined the Department of Psychiatry at the University of Pennsylvania in 1954. The department chair was Kenneth Ellmaker Appel, a psychoanalyst who was president of the American Psychiatric Association, whose efforts to expand the presence and relatedness of psychiatry had a big influence on Beck's career. At the same time, Beck began formal training in psychoanalysis at the Philadelphia Institute of the American Psychoanalytic Association.

Beck's closest colleague was Marvin Stein, a friend since their army hospital days to whom Beck looked up to for his scientific rigor in psychoneuroimmunology. Beck's first research was with Leon J. Saul, a psychoanalyst known for unusual methods such as therapy by telephone or setting homework, who had developed inventory questionnaires to quantify ego processes in the manifest content of dreams (that which can be directly reported by the dreamer). Beck and a graduate student developed a new inventory they used to assess "masochistic" hostility in manifest dreams, published in 1959. This study found themes of loss and rejection related to depression, rather than inverted hostility as predicted by psychoanalysis. Developing the work with funding from the National Institute of Mental Health, Beck came up with what he would call the Beck Depression Inventory, which he published in 1961 and soon started to market, unsupported by Appel. In another experiment, he found that depressed patients sought encouragement or improvement following disapproval, rather than seeking out suffering and failure as predicted by the Freudian anger-turned-inwards theory.

Through the 1950s, Beck adhered to the department's psychoanalytic theories while pursuing experimentation and harboring private doubts. In 1961, however, controversy over whom to appoint the new chair of psychiatry—specifically, fierce psychoanalytic opposition to the favored choice of biomedical researcher Eli Robins—brought matters to a head, an early skirmish in a power shift away from psychoanalysis nationally. Beck tried to remain neutral and, with Albert J. Stunkard, opposed a petition to block Robins. Stunkard, a behaviorist who specialized in obesity and who had dropped out of psychoanalytic training, was eventually appointed department head in the face of sustained opposition which again Beck would not engage in, putting him at bitter odds with his friend Stein.

On top of this, despite having graduated from his Philadelphia training, the American Psychoanalytic Institute rejected Beck's membership application in 1960, skeptical of his claims of success from relatively brief therapy and advising he conduct further supervised therapy on the more advanced or termination phases of a case, and again in 1961 when he had not done so but outlined his clinical and research work. Such deferments were a tactic used by the institute to maintain the orthodoxy in teaching, but Beck did not know this at the time and has described the decision as stupid and dumb.

Beck usually explained his increasing belief in his cognitive model by reference to a patient he had been listening to for a year at the Penn clinic. When he suggested she was anxious due to her ego being confronted by her sexual impulses, and asked her whether she believed this when she did not seem convinced, she said she was actually worried that she was being boring, and that she thought this often and with everyone.

=== Private practice ===
In 1962, Beck requested a sabbatical and would go into private practice for five years. In that same year, he was already making notes about patterns of thoughts in depression, emphasizing what can be observed and tested by anyone and treated in the present. He was engaged by George Kelly's personal construct theory and Jean Piaget's schemas. Beck's first articles on the cognitive theory of depression, in 1963 and 1964 in the Archives of General Psychiatry, maintained the psychiatric context of ego psychology but then turned to concepts of realistic and scientific thinking in the terms of the new cognitive psychology, extended to become a therapeutic need.

Beck's notebooks were also filled with self-analysis, where at least twice a day for several years he wrote out his own "negative" (later "automatic") thoughts, rated with a percentile belief score, classified and restructured.

The psychologist who would become most important for Beck was Albert Ellis, whose own faith in psychoanalysis had crumbled by the 1950s. He had begun presenting his "rational therapy" by the mid-1950s. Beck recalled that Ellis contacted him in the mid-1960s after his two articles in the Archives of General Psychiatry, and therefore he discovered Ellis had developed a rich theory and pragmatic therapy that he was able to use to some extent as a framework blended with his own, though he disliked Ellis's technique of telling patients what he thought was going on rather than helping the client to learn for themselves empirically. Psychoanalyst Gerald E. Kochansky remarked in 1975 in a review of one of Beck's books that he could no longer tell if Beck was a psychoanalyst or a devotee of Ellis. Beck highlighted the classical philosophical Socratic method as an inspiration, while Ellis highlighted disputation which he stated was not anti-empirical and taught people how to dispute internally. Both Beck and Ellis cited aspects of the ancient philosophical system of Stoicism as a forerunner of their ideas. Beck cited Epictetus as an influence from Stoicism.

In 1967, becoming active again at University of Pennsylvania, Beck still described himself and his new therapy (as he always would quietly) as neo-Freudian in the ego psychology school, albeit focused on interactions with the environment rather than internal drives. He offered cognitive therapy work as a relatively "neutral" space and a bridge to psychology. With a monograph on depression that Beck published in 1967, according to historian Rachael Rosner: "Cognitive Therapy entered the marketplace as a corrective experimentalist psychological framework both for himself and his patients and for his fellow psychiatrists."

== Cognitive therapy ==
Working with depressed patients, Beck found that they experienced streams of negative thoughts that seemed to arise spontaneously. He termed these cognitions "automatic thoughts", and discovered that their content fell into three categories: negative ideas about oneself, the world, and the future. He stated that such cognitions were interrelated as the cognitive triad. Limited time spent reflecting on automatic thoughts would lead patients to treat them as valid.

Beck began helping patients identify and evaluate these thoughts and found that by doing so, patients were able to think more realistically, which led them to feel better emotionally and behave more functionally. He developed key ideas in CBT, explaining that different disorders were associated with different types of distorted thinking. Distorted thinking has a negative effect on a person's behavior no matter what type of disorder they had, he found. Beck explained that successful interventions will educate a person to understand and become aware of their distorted thinking, and how to challenge its effects. He discovered that frequent negative automatic thoughts reveal a person's core beliefs. He explained that core beliefs are formed over lifelong experiences; we "feel" these beliefs to be true.

Since that time, Beck and his colleagues worldwide have researched the efficacy of this form of psychotherapy in treating a wide variety of disorders including depression, bipolar disorder, eating disorders, drug abuse, anxiety disorders, personality disorders, and many other medical conditions with psychological components. Cognitive therapy has also been applied with success to individuals with schizophrenia. He also focused on cognitive therapy for schizophrenia, borderline personality disorder, and for patients who have had recurrent suicide attempts.

Beck's recent research on the treatment of schizophrenia has suggested that patients once believed to be non-responsive to treatment are amenable to positive change. Even the most severe presentations of the illness, such as those involving long periods of hospitalization, bizarre behavior, poor personal hygiene, self-injury, and aggressiveness, can respond positively to a modified version of cognitive behavioral treatment.

Although Beck's approach has sometimes been criticized as too mechanistic, modern CBT stresses the importance of a warm and encouraging therapeutic relationship and tailoring treatment to the specific challenges of each individual. Beck's work was presented as a far more scientific and experimentally-based development than psychoanalysis (while being less reductive than behaviorism), Beck's key principles were not necessarily based on the general findings and models of cognitive psychology or neuroscience developing at that time but were derived from personal clinical observations and interpretations in his therapy office. And although there have been many cognitive models developed for different mental disorders and hundreds of outcome studies on the effectiveness of CBT—relatively easy because of the narrow, time-limited and manual-based nature of the treatment—there has been much less focus on experimentally proving the supposedly active mechanisms; in some cases the predicted causal relationships have not been found, such as between dysfunctional attitudes and outcomes.

== Organizations ==
Beck was involved in research studies at the University of Pennsylvania, and conducted biweekly Case Conferences at Beck Institute for area psychiatric residents, graduate students, and mental health professionals. He met every two weeks with conference participants and generally did two to three role plays. He was elected a Fellow of the American Academy of Arts and Sciences in 2007.

Beck was the founder and President Emeritus of the non-profit Beck Institute for Cognitive Behavior Therapy, and the director of the Aaron T. Beck Psychopathology Research Center, which was the parent organization of the Center for the Treatment and Prevention of Suicide, which is now known as the Penn Center for the Prevention of Suicide. In 1986, he was a visiting scientist at Oxford University.

He was a professor emeritus at Penn since 1992, and an adjunct professor at both Temple University and University of Medicine and Dentistry of New Jersey. During his time at Penn, he pioneered the development of Recovery-Oriented Cognitive Therapy. While the Center for CT-R was created at Penn, it was later absorbed by Beck Institute.

== Personal life and death ==
Beck was married in 1950 to Honorable Phyllis W. Beck (ret.), and they had four children together: Roy, Judy, Dan, and Alice. Phyllis was the first woman judge on the appellate court of the Commonwealth of Pennsylvania. Her youngest daughter, Alice Beck Dubow, is a judge on the same court, while the older daughter Judith is a prominent CBT educator and clinician, who wrote the basic text in the field and is a co-founder of the non-profit Beck Institute. He turned 100 on July 18, 2021, and died later in the year on November 1 in his sleep at his home in Philadelphia.

== Questionnaires ==
Along with the Beck Depression Inventory (BDI), Beck developed the Beck Hopelessness Scale, Beck Scale for Suicidal Ideation (BSS), Beck Anxiety Inventory (BAI), Beck Youth Inventories, Clark-Beck Obsessive-Compulsive Inventory (CBOCI), Personality Belief Questionnaire (PBQ), Dysfunctional Attitude Scale (DAS), Suicide Intent Scale (SIS), Sociotropy-Autonomy Scale (SAS), Cognitive Therapy Rating Scale (CTRS), Beck Cognitive Insight Scale (BCIS), Satisfaction with Therapy Questionnaire (STQ) and BDI–Fast Screen for Medical Patients.

Beck collaborated with psychologist Maria Kovacs in the development of the Children's Depression Inventory, which used the BDI as a template.

== Selected awards and honors ==
- The 7th Annual Heinz Award in the Human Condition
- The 1992 James McKeen Cattell Fellow Award
- The 1999 Joseph Zubin Award
- The 2004 University of Louisville Grawemeyer Award for Psychology
- The 2006 Lasker-DeBakey Clinical Medical Research Award
- The 2010 Bell of Hope Award
- The 2010 Sigmund Freud Award
- The 2010 Scholarship and Research Award
- The 2011 Edward J. Sachar Award
- The 2011 Prince Mahidol Award in Medicine
- The 2013 Kennedy Community Mental Health Award

Beck received honorary degrees from Yale University, University of Pennsylvania, Brown University, Assumption College, and Philadelphia College of Osteopathic Medicine.

In 2017, Medscape named Beck the fourth most influential physician in the past century.

== Works ==
=== Selected books ===
- Beck, A.T. (1967). The diagnosis and management of depression. Philadelphia, PA: University of Pennsylvania Press. ISBN 978-0-8122-7674-9
- Beck, A.T. (1972). Depression: Causes and treatment. Philadelphia, PA: University of Pennsylvania Press. ISBN 978-0-8122-7652-7
- Beck, A.T. (1975). Cognitive therapy and the emotional disorders. Madison, CT: International Universities Press, Inc. ISBN 978-0-8236-0990-1
- Beck, A.T., Rush, A.J., Shaw, B.F., & Emery, G. (1979). Cognitive therapy of depression. New York, NY: Guilford Press. ISBN 978-0-89862-000-9
- Beck, A.T., Wright, F.D., Newman, C.F., & Liese, B.S. (1993). Cognitive therapy of substance abuse. New York: Guilford Press. ISBN 978-1-57230-659-2
- Beck, A.T. (1999). Prisoners of hate: The cognitive basis of anger, hostility, and violence. New York, NY: HarperCollins Publishers. ISBN 978-0-06-019377-5
- Newman, C., Leahy, R. L., Beck, A. T., Reilly-Harringon, N. A., Gyulai, L. (2002). Bipolar disorder: A cognitive therapy approach. Washington, DC: American Psychological Association. ISBN 978-1-55798-789-1
- Beck, A.T., Freeman, A., & Davis, D.D. (2003). Cognitive therapy of personality disorders. New York, NY: Guilford Press. ISBN 978-1-57230-856-5
- Beck, A.T., Emery, G., & Greenberg, R.L. (2005). Anxiety disorders and phobias: A cognitive perspective. New York, NY: Basic Books. ISBN 978-0-465-00587-1
- Beck, A.T., Rector, N.A., Stolar, N., & Grant, P. (2008). Schizophrenia: Cognitive theory, research, and therapy. New York, NY: Guilford Press. ISBN 978-1-60623-018-3
- Beck, A. T. & Alford, B. A. (2009). Depression: Causes and Treatments (2nd ed). Philadelphia: University of Pennsylvania Press. ISBN 978-0-8122-1964-7
- Beck, A.T. & David A. Clark (2012). The Anxiety and Worry Workbook: The Cognitive Behavioral Solution. New York, NY: Guilford Press. ISBN 978-1-60623-918-6

=== Selected articles ===
- Beck, A.T., & Haigh, E. A.-P. (2014). "Advances in Cognitive Theory and Therapy: The Generic Cognitive Model". Annual Review of Clinical Psychology, 10, 1–24. doi:10.1146/annurev-clinpsy-032813-153734
- Beck, A. T., & Bredemeier, K. (2016). "A Unified Model of Depression Integrating Clinical, Cognitive, Biological, and Evolutionary Perspectives". Clinical Psychological Science, 4(4), 596–619. doi:10.1177/2167702616628523
- Beck, A. T. (2019). "A 60-Year Evolution of Cognitive Theory and Therapy". Perspectives on Psychological Science, 14(1), 16–20. doi:10.1177/1745691618804187

== See also ==
- David D. Burns
