= Youth Outcome Questionnaire =

- Purpose: data collection for mental health intervention

The Youth Outcome Questionnaire is a collection of questions designed to collect data regarding the effectiveness of youth therapies. The Y-OQ is a parent report measure of treatment progress for children and adolescents (ages 4–17) receiving mental health interventions. The Y-OQ–SR is an adolescent self report measure appropriate for ages 12–18.

The psychometric properties of the Youth Outcome Questionnaire Self-Report version (Y-OQ-SR) were examined by a group of researchers at Brigham Young University, including Dr. Gary M. Burlingame and Dr. Michael J. Lambert. They reported a favorable analysis in terms of internal consistency, test-retest reliability, and concurrent validity. They report it to be a valid and reliable self-report measure of psychosocial distress in youth psychotherapy research. The Y-OQ-SR is backed by data based on large samples of youth who were carefully chosen to be representative of both clinical and normal populations. Higher scores indicate greater dysfunction, patients in psychiatric hospitals score about 100. Those in outpatient treatment average about 78 and the normal population is less than 47.

The Y-OQ measures six subscales:

- Intrapersonal Distress (ID) – Anxiety, depression, fearfulness, etc.
- Somatic (S) – Headache, stomach, bowel, dizziness, etc.
- Interpersonal Relationships (IR) – Attitude, communication and interaction with parents, adults, and peers.
- Critical Items (CI) – Paranoid ideation, suicide, hallucinatory, delusions, etc.
- Social Problems (SP) – Delinquent or aggressive behaviors, breaking social mores.
- Behavioral Dysfunction (BD) – Organize and complete tasks, handle frustration, impulsivity, inattention.

The subscale scores can be used to identify and target particularly problematic areas as a focus of treatment and help with treatment planning.

These questionnaires have been used in outcome studies for individual teen programs and groups of therapeutic boarding schools and adventure therapy or wilderness therapy programs. One such study, involving 993 students from 9 schools was presented at the 114th Annual Convention of the American Psychological Association. Another study from 2001, involving 858 kids and their families enrolled in a group of seven wilderness therapy programs for a full year, has been published by the University of Idaho.
