= Feminist Perspectives on Eating Disorders =

1994 book

- Editor: Patricia Fallon; Melanie A. Katzman; Susan C. Wooley
- Language: English
- Publisher: Guilford Press
- Publication date: 1994
- Pages: 465
- ISBN: 0-89862-1801
- OCLC: 28222100

Feminist Perspectives on Eating Disorders is a 1994 edited volume. It was edited by Patricia Fallon, Melanie A. Katzman, and Susan C. Wooley and published by Guilford Press.

== Synopsis ==
The book contains chapters by a variety of authors covering among other topics, the connection between eating disorders and sexual abuse and the psychological research on physical attractiveness. It is split into five parts, with the first part discussing wider societal and historical issues around eating disorders, the second addressing the meaning of living in the female form. The third and fourth sections discuss, respectively, treatment issues and direct testimonies from therapists and adolescents facing these issues. The fifth section focuses on strategies for treatment and how they are complicated by wider societal forces.

== Reception ==
Feminist Collections praised it as an "excellent resource" in bringing together writings from many important American writers covering the experience of women, saying it contained chapters that should be "required reading for every woman". A review from the journal Adolescence called it "illuminating" for the topic, while another reviewer from the Healthy Weight Journal said that it was an important one. They did note that the title of the book "may limit its readership", as it was not entirely about eating disorders. Janet Sayers writing for the British Journal of Psychiatry criticized the book for, in her opinion, sacrificing "detail to generalization", but overall called it a "lively volume" that raised several questions by taking the broader view of the topic. Nina Heller criticized the redundancy of the content between the chapters in the book, calling it distracting, but said this was a flaw shared by many edited volumes.
