= Maria Kovacs =

American psychologist

- Education: University of Pennsylvania School of Medicine (Ph.D.)
- Known for: Children's Depression Inventory
- Scientific career
- Fields: Psychology
- Workplaces: University of Pittsburgh School of Medicine

Maria Kovacs is an American psychologist and academic. She is a Distinguished Professor of Psychiatry at the University of Pittsburgh School of Medicine. She is the developer of the Children's Depression Inventory.

== Biography ==
Kovacs earned an undergraduate degree in psychology from Queens College, City University of New York, a master's degree from Teachers College, Columbia University, and a Ph.D. from the University of Pennsylvania School of Medicine. In 1976, with Aaron T. Beck and Arlene Weissman, Kovacs co-authored a study establishing a correlation between suicide and hopelessness. The next year, she published the Children's Depression Inventory, which was largely based on the Beck Depression Inventory that had already been used for adults. In 1979, Beck, Kovacs and Weissman published the Scale for Suicide Ideation (SSI), which measures the frequency and severity of suicidal thoughts.

Kovacs is a Distinguished Professor of Psychiatry at the University of Pittsburgh School of Medicine. She is a fellow of the Association for Psychological Science. She received the 2013 Paul Hoch Award from the American Psychopathological Association in recognition of her research into psychopathology. In 2003, Kovacs was included in the ISI Highly Cited database.
