= Judith S. Beck =

American psychologist

- Born: May 4, 1954 (age 72)
- Known for: President of Beck Institute for Cognitive Behavior Therapy
- Father: Aaron Beck
- Scientific career
- Fields: Cognitive behavior therapy
- Workplaces: University of Pennsylvania

Judith S. Beck (born May 5, 1954) is an American psychologist who is best known for her work in cognitive therapy and cognitive behavioral therapy. Her father is Aaron Beck, the founder of cognitive therapy, with whom she has worked on many occasions. She received her doctoral degree from the University of Pennsylvania in 1982.

== Career ==
=== Writing ===
Beck is the author of the widely adopted and widely cited textbook, Cognitive Therapy: Basics and Beyond, which has been translated into 20 languages and is a basic textbook in the field for many students in psychiatry, psychology, counseling, social work, and psychiatric nursing in the U.S. and around the world. Her other books include Cognitive Therapy for Challenging Problems: What to Do When the Basics Don't Work, The Oxford Textbook of Psychotherapy, Cognitive Therapy of Personality Disorders, as well as The New York Times Best Seller (Advice/2007) The Beck Diet Solution and The Beck Diet Solution Weight Loss Workbook, The Complete Beck Diet for Life, and The Diet Trap Solution, a cognitive therapy approach to weight loss and maintenance. Beck co-developed the Beck Youth Scales for Social and Emotional Impairment and has written hundreds of articles, chapters, and books, for professionals and consumers, on the various applications of cognitive therapy in treatment and training.

=== Beck Institute and teaching ===
Beck is the President of the non-profit Beck Institute for Cognitive Behavior Therapy in suburban Philadelphia. She is also a Clinical Professor of Psychology in Psychiatry at the University of Pennsylvania, where she teaches residents. Beck directs the three major functions of the Beck Institute: education, clinical care, and research. In these capacities, she is involved with administration, teaching and supervising mental-health professionals, treating patients, writing, developing educational materials, and consultation. She is a consultant for research studies funded by the National Institute of Mental Health, and assists hospitals, residency training programs, community mental health centers, and other organizations in setting up or improving their cognitive therapy programs.

== Awards ==
- 1998-1999 Psychiatric Residents (III & IV) Faculty Teaching Award
- 2003-2004 Excellence in Cognitive Therapy Award
- 2007 Distinguished Contributions to the Science and Profession of Psychology
- 2007 Health Disparities Award
- 2009 Aaron T. Beck Award for Significant and Enduring Contributions to Cognitive Behavior Therapy
- 2009 Distinguished Workshop Presenter Award
- 2011 Outstanding Contributions by an Individual for Clinical Activities Award
- 2012 Earl Bond Award for Distinguished Teaching of Medical Students and Residents, University of Pennsylvania Health System, Department of Psychiatry
- 2017 Greater Philadelphia Social Innovations Award for Community and Behavioral Health Innovator, Social Innovations Journal
- 2017 Clinical Faculty Award, Department of Psychiatry, Perelman School of Medicine, University of Pennsylvania
- 2018 Doctor of Humane Letters (honoris causa), Assumption College

== Selected works ==
- Beck, J. S. (1995). Cognitive therapy: Basics and beyond. New York: Guilford.
- Beck, J. S. (2005). Cognitive therapy for challenging problems: What to do when the basics don’t work. New York: Guilford.
- Beck, J. S. (2007). The Beck Diet Solution. Birmingham, AL: Oxmoor House Publications.
- Beck, J. S. (2007). Beck diet solution weight loss workbook: The 6-week plan to train your brain to think like a thin person. Birmingham, AL: Oxmoor House Publications.
- Beck, J. S. (2011). Cognitive behavior therapy: Basics and beyond. 2nd ed. New York: Guilford
- Beck, J. S., & Beck, A. T. (2001). Beck youth inventories of emotional and social impairment. Texas: The Psychological Corporation.
- Beck, A., Freeman, A., Davis, D., A., Pretzer, J., Fleming, B., Ottaviani, R., Beck, J. S., Simon, K., Padesky, C., Meyer, J., & Trexler, L., & Associates. (2004). Cognitive therapy of personality disorders, 2nd ed. New York: Guilford.
- Gabbard, G., Beck, J. S., & Holmes, J. (Eds.) (2005). Oxford textbook of psychotherapy. London: Oxford University Press.

== See also ==
- Cognitive behavioral therapy
