= Cathy Malchiodi =

American art therapist

- Education: Tufts University (BFA); Notre Dame de Namur University (MA); University of Utah (PgD); Northcentral University (PhD)
- Occupations: Art Therapist; Expressive Arts Therapist

Cathy Malchiodi (born 1953) is an American licensed professional mental health counselor, registered expressive arts therapist, and art therapist, best known for her work on trauma-informed treatment in expressive arts therapy.

Malchiodi is known for advancing trauma-related theories in art therapy, expressive art therapy (which is a distinct and separate field from art therapy), and in trauma therapy involving the treatment of children.

== Early life and education ==
Malchiodi's work in the arts began as a student at the Museum School of Fine Arts in Boston MA where she studied multicultural arts, painting and conceptual/performance arts, where she achieved her BFA in 1975. Between 1975 and 1980 she studied art therapy at the College of Notre Dame De Namur and was awarded an MA. In 1988 she attended the University of Utah, where she was awarded her post-graduate degree in Counseling and Health Education in 1992. She attended Northcentral University and was awarded her PhD in psychology in 2009. During this time she became a professional credentialed member of several different mental health associations with different designations of licensure. These accreditations include Licensed Professional Art Therapist (LPAT), her Board Certified-Registered Art Therapist (ATR-BC), Licensed Professional Clinical Counselor (LPCC) and her license as a Registered Expressive Arts Therapist (REAT).

== Academic work and career ==
In an interview, Malchiodi states that she found her calling as an art therapist after finding work at a shelter for children escaping domestic violence, where she saw the importance of art in the role of healing and recovery.

Between 1994 and 2011, Malchiodi was a faculty member for the National Institute for Trauma & Loss in Children. In this role she developed art-based trauma intervention programs for children and families of military personnel and veterans. While there she also served as editor for the journal Trauma & Loss: Research & Interventions. In 2010 she founded the Trauma-Informed Practices & Expressive Arts Therapy Institute based on the book Trauma and Expressive Arts Therapy: Brain, Body and Imagination in the Healing Process to educate and promote the application of expressive arts therapy and art therapy towards the treatment of trauma in children and adults. The institute offers live and online courses, certificate programs and distance learning opportunities in the United States and internationally. She also co-founded Art Therapy Without Borders, a nonprofit corporation organized to support international art therapy initiatives and the work of art therapists.

In 2009, she was elected president of the Counseling Association for Humanistic Education and Development. In that same year she was named president of the Association for Humanistic Counseling, which is a part of the American Counseling Association.

In addition, she has served in roles as adjunct and visiting faculty at Lesley University, Prescott College, Southern Illinois University, University of Louisville, and Southwestern College.

Malchiodi has served on Boards of Directors for numerous organizations including the American Counseling Association; Association for Humanistic Counseling (AHC; President 2009–2010); Delegate, 20/20 Future of Counseling National Task Force; and American Art Therapy Association. She is a consultant on trauma intervention by numerous organizations and businesses including the Department of Defense.

Throughout her career she published over 130 articles for Psychology Today and other publications in art therapy and trauma.

== Awards ==
Malchiodi is a member of the American Art Therapy Association. In 2002, she was awarded with the Distinguished Service Award, Clinician Award, and Honorary Life Member Award, which is described as the “highest honor” available in the association. She is the first person to have received all three awards that the group offers. She is the recipient of the Kennedy Center and Very Special Arts for her art therapy work in the US, Hong Kong, and Beijing. She has received the Presidential Award from the Association for Humanistic Counseling. In 2011, she was awarded the William Steele Award for contributions in the field of trauma from the National Institute for Trauma and Loss in Children.

== Selected publications ==
- Malchiodi, Cathy (2020). Trauma and Expressive Arts Therapy: Brain, Body and Imagination in the Healing Process. Guilford Press. ISBN 978-1462543113.
- Malchiodi, Cathy (2018). Handbook of Art Therapy and Digital Technology. Jessica Kingsley. ISBN 978-1785927928.
- Malchiodi & Crenshaw, D., Cathy (2017). What to do when children "clam-up" in psychotherapy: Interventions to facilitate communication. Guilford Press. ISBN 978-1462530427.
- Malchiodi, Cathy (2015). Creative interventions with traumatized children (2nd ed.). Guilford Press. ISBN 978-1462518166.
- Malchiodi & Crenshaw, D., Cathy (2014). Creative arts and play therapy with attachment problems. Guilford Press. ISBN 978-1462523702.
- Malchiodi, Cathy (2013). Art therapy and health care. Guilford Press. ISBN 978-1462507160.
- Malchiodi, Cathy (2012). Handbook of Art Therapy (2nd ed.). Guilford Press. ISBN 9781609189754.
- Steele, W.; Malchiodi, Cathy (2012). Trauma-informed practices with children and adolescents. Taylor & Francis. ISBN 978-0415890526.
