= Clinical Psychology & Psychotherapy =

- Discipline: Clinical psychology, psychotherapy
- Language: English
- Edited by: Paul Emmelkamp (editor-in-chief)

Publication details
- History: 1993-present
- Publisher: John Wiley & Sons
- Frequency: Bimonthly
- Impact factor: 3.2 (2023)

Standard abbreviations
- ISO 4: Clin. Psychol. Psychother.

Indexing
- CODEN: CPPSEO
- ISSN: 1063-3995 (print); 1099-0879 (web)
- OCLC no.: 26001147

Links
- Journal homepage; Online access; Online archive

Clinical Psychology & Psychotherapy is a bimonthly peer-reviewed medical journal covering clinical psychology and psychotherapy. It was established in 1993 and is published by John Wiley & Sons. The editor-in-chief is Paul Emmelkamp (University of Amsterdam). According to Journal Citation Reports, the journal has a 2023 impact factor of 3.2, ranking it in the first quartile of the category "Psychology, Clinical".
