= Gregg Henriques =

American psychologist

Gregg R. Henriques is an American psychologist. He is a professor for the Combined-Integrated Doctoral Program at James Madison University in Harrisonburg, Virginia, US.

He developed a Unified Theory of Knowledge (UTOK), which consists of eight key ideas that Henriques claims results in a much more unified vision of science, psychology and philosophy.

Henriques has specific research interests in social motivation and affect, beliefs and values, integrative psychotherapy, depression and suicide, the nature of mental disorders, and the relationship between psychiatry and professional psychology. For his education, he received his master's degree in clinical/community psychology from the University of North Carolina at Charlotte, and his Ph.D. in clinical psychology from the University of Vermont. He also worked two years as a research assistant professor at the University of Pennsylvania, where his primary role was director of a randomized controlled clinical trial exploring the effectiveness of psychotherapy for people who have recently attempted suicide.

== Publications ==
- Henriques, G. R. (2011). A new unified theory of psychology . New York: Springer.
- Henriques, G. R. (2022). A new synthesis for solving the problem of psychology: Addressing the Enlightenment Gap. Palgrave-Macmillan.
