= Major Depression Inventory =

- Purpose: generates an ICD-10 or DSM-IV diagnosis of clinical depression

The Major Depression Inventory (MDI) is a self-report mood questionnaire developed by the World Health Organization. The instrument was constructed by a team led by Professor Per Bech, a psychiatrist based at Frederiksborg General Hospital in Denmark. The MDI differs from many other self-report inventories, such as the Beck Depression Inventory (BDI), because it is able to generate an ICD-10 or DSM-IV diagnosis of clinical depression in addition to an estimate of symptom severity.

Unlike many other similar instruments, the MDI is available free of charge and can be downloaded from the internet with a full manual and scoring instructions. This makes it an attractive option in epidemiological population surveys. It has also been translated into seven languages.

== Scoring ==
To measure treatment outcome the sum of the ten items is used. A higher score signifies deeper depression.

When using the scale to diagnose depression according to ICD-10, there are the following possibilities:

- Mild depression: A score of 4 or 5 in two of the first three items. Plus a score of at least 3 on two or three of the last seven items.
- Moderate depression: A score of 4 or 5 in two or three of the first three items. Plus a score of at least 3 on four of the last seven items.
- Severe depression: A score of 4 or 5 in all of the first three items. Plus a score of at least 3 on five or more of the last seven items.
- Major depression: The number of items is reduced to nine, as Item 4 is part of Item 5. Include whichever of the two items has the highest score (item 4 or 5). A score on at least five items is required, to be scored as follows: the score on the first three items must be at least 4, and on the other items at least 3. Either Item 1 or 2 must have a score of 4 or 5.

== See also ==
- Diagnostic classification and rating scales used in psychiatry
