= Todd D. Little =

American psychologist

Todd D Little
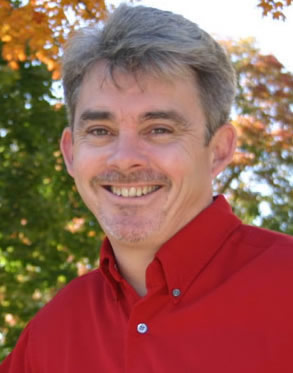
- Born: September 6, 1960 (age 65); Kalispell, Montana
- Education: University of California, Riverside
- Known for: Developmental psychology
- Spouse(s): Patricia H. Hawley (2017), A. Doyal (2019-PRESENT)
- Scientific career
- Fields: Psychology, education
- Workplaces: Max Planck Institute for Human Development; Yale University; University of Kansas; Texas Tech University
- Doctoral advisor: Keith. F Widman
- Website: http:// www.statscamp.org

Todd D. Little is a professor of Educational Psychology in the Research, Evaluation, Measurement, and Statistics (REMS) concentration in Educational Psychology at Texas Tech University.

== Education ==
In 1983, Little received a Bachelor of Arts degree in English literature from University of California, Riverside. He went on to pursue his doctorate degree in developmental psychology at University of California, Riverside. His doctoral thesis was titled Individual differences in the development of numerical facility : a production task paradigm.

== Career ==
Little is a specialist on various aspects of applied statistical methodology as well as his developmental research. He has provided methodological guidance at the Max Planck Institute for Human Development. Center for Lifespan Studies (1991–1998), Yale University's department of psychology (1998–2002), and the University of Kansas (2003–2013), including the founding and directing of the Center for Research Methods and Data Analysis (2010–2013). Little was recruited to join TTU in 2013 to establish REMS (with Eugene Wang) as a program and to become the founding Director of the Institute for Measurement, Methodology, Analysis and Policy. Also in 2013, he was awarded an honorary professorship at East China Normal University, Shanghai, China.

=== Outreach ===
Little organizes and co-teaches at an annual Stats Camp which he founded in 2003. The camp provides advanced training in state-of-the science statistical procedures to over 1500 graduates students, post-docs, and faculty from every continent.

He started a minority scholarship program in partnership with SMEP which has supplied over $100,000 for travel, housing, and fees to allow minority scholars to attend Stats Camp. More recently, he also founded (with Noel Card) the Developmental Methods conference, an annual event for social science researchers.

== Research ==
Little is a Fellow of the American Association for the Advancement of Science (AAAS) as well as the American Psychological Association (APA Divisions 5, 7, & 15) and the Association for Psychological Science (APS). In 2001, Little was elected to the Society for Multivariate Experimental Psychology. In 2009, he was elected President of the APS's Division 5 (then called Evaluation, Measurement, and Statistics).
