= Beck Institute for Cognitive Behavior Therapy =

Non-profit organization

Beck Institute logo

The Beck Institute for Cognitive Behavior Therapy, a non-profit organization located in suburban Philadelphia, is an international cognitive behavior therapy (CBT) training and research center. It was founded in 1994 by Aaron T. Beck and his daughter Judith S. Beck.

Aaron T. Beck was the Beck Institute's President Emeritus. Beck died on November 1, 2021, at age 100. He is recognized as the founder of cognitive therapy, one of the elements from which cognitive behavior therapy developed. His daughter, Judith Beck, is the current president of the Beck Institute. Aaron Beck was University Professor Emeritus of Psychiatry at the time of his death at the University of Pennsylvania and had continued doing research there, while Judith Beck is a clinical professor of psychology in psychiatry at the same university. Beck Institute's executive director is Dr. Allen R. Miller.

Among the Institute's training programs are live online workshops and comprehensive on-demand courses for health and mental health professionals around the world. The organization also offers supervision and consultation for therapists. Training programs are geared towards individuals and organizations. Workshops cover a variety of topics, including CBT for depression, anxiety, personality disorders, youth, PTSD, schizophrenia, and more. Beck Institute offers scholarships for therapists working with active-duty military and veterans through its Military and Veterans Suicide Prevention initiative and holds an annual scholarship competition for graduate students and faculty.

The Beck Institute also runs a clinic at its location in suburban Philadelphia.
