= Christine Padesky =

American psychologist

Christine Padesky is a clinical psychologist from the United States. She is known for her work on Cognitive Behavioural Therapy and she is a co-founder of the Center for Cognitive Therapy in Huntington Beach, California.

== Works ==
Padesky works with Kathleen Mooney to develop a new approach called “strength-based cognitive therapy.” She has co-written five books, including the popular Mind Over Mood (with Dennis Greenberger) and Cognitive Therapy of Personality Disorder. She published many papers.
