= Donald H. Baucom =

American psychologist

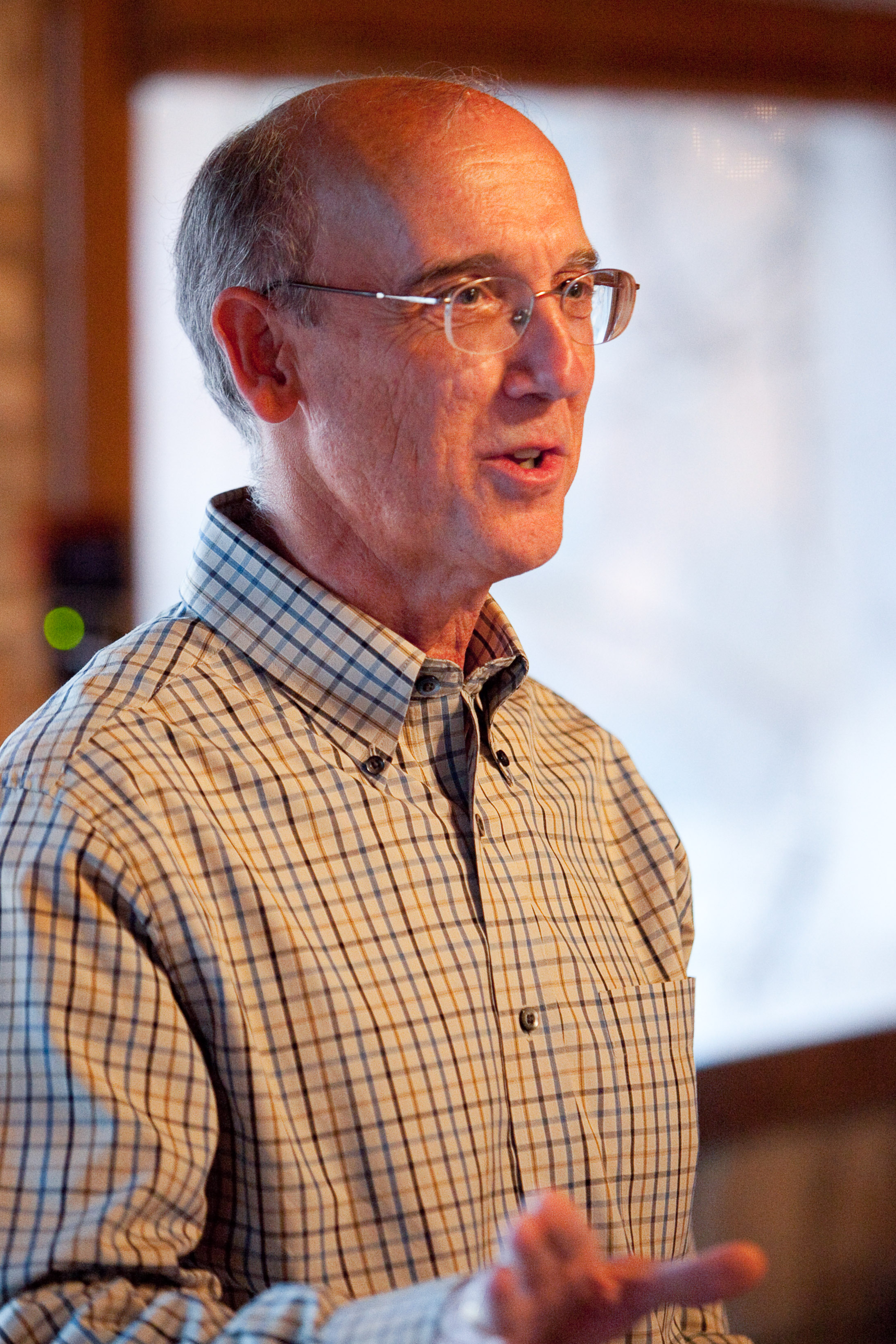
- Baucom addressing researchers
- Born: July 22, 1949 (age 77)
- Education: University of North Carolina at Chapel Hill, (A.B.)(Ph.D.)
- Known for: Founding the field of Cognitive-Behavioral Couples Therapy
- Scientific career
- Fields: Psychologist

Donald H. Baucom, (born 22 July 1949) is a clinical psychology faculty member at the University of North Carolina-Chapel Hill. He is recognized for founding the field of Cognitive-Behavioral Couples Therapy. Baucom is also recognized as one of the top marital therapists and most prolific researchers in this field. Currently, Baucom's National Cancer Institute funded study, CanThrive, has the largest observationally coded sample of any couples study to date.

== Biography ==
Baucom lives in Chapel Hill, North Carolina where he is the Richard Lee Simpson Distinguished Professor of Psychology at UNC. He is a familiar face on campus, having received both his bachelor's degree and his Ph.D. from UNC. Baucom's son Brian is also a Clinical Psychologist. Brian worked in southern California where he received his Ph.D. from the University of California, Los Angeles. He currently works at the University of Utah.

== Research description ==
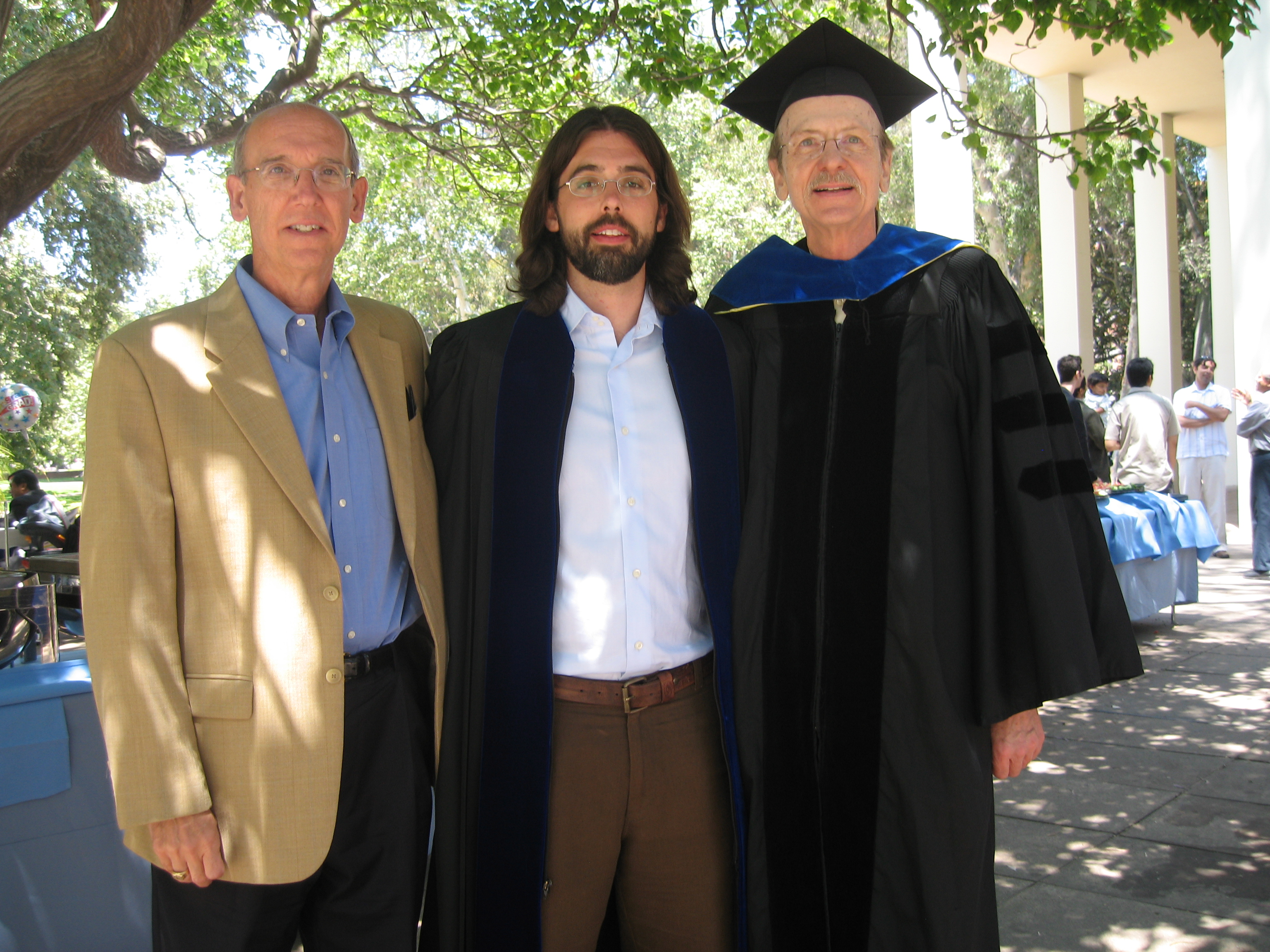
Baucom with fellow couples researchers Brian Baucom (center) and Andrew Christensen (right)

For over thirty years, Donald H. Baucom has focused his research on the dynamics of intimate relationships and how various factors contribute to distress, as well as joy, in couples. As a strong proponent of the scientist-practitioner model he is committed to the development of empirically based effective interventions for partners in intimate relationships. In doing so, he has been a leader in the development of the theoretical, empirical, and clinical foundation of cognitive-behavioral therapy that is used for helping couples in distress. Baucom has spent his career observing the ways in which couples interact, and how these individual interaction styles can cause both distress and joy in relationships based on factors such as social support, health, and infidelity.

Social Support: Baucom has been interested in the ways by which social support styles contribute to both positive and negative functioning during the course of a relationship.

Health: Baucom has studied the ways in which physiological/psychological health can become stressors in a dyad that can contribute to distress. For example, he has developed intervention studies based on the effects of anorexia, cancer, smoking, and arthritis with regards to couples functioning.

Infidelity: This area is of particular interest to Baucom due to the severity of the direct distress it causes to the relationship. He has collaborated with his colleagues to develop a self-help book for partners experiencing infidelity, and is in the process of creating a training manual to guide practitioners in the aid of couples dealing with infidelity.

Obsessive-compulsive disorder: Baucom has collaborated with experts on obsessive-compulsive disorder (OCD) to develop a couple-based cognitive-behavioral treatment approach for couples in which one partner has this anxiety-related disorder. The treatment involves primarily bringing the non-OCD partner into therapy and training him or her to be a coach to help with exposure and response prevention for the partner with OCD. The couple also learns effective communication strategies and techniques for reducing accommodation and avoidance behaviors together.

=== CanThrive ===
Currently, Baucom is working on a large-scale treatment study funded by the National Cancer Institute called CanThrive. This is a couple-based intervention focused on partnerships in which the female has breast cancer. This study observes and measures various aspects of communicated social support between both partners, and is interested in finding possible relationships between differences in social support and treatment outcomes for breast cancer. This study has the largest observationally coded sample of any couples study to date, and is based at both the University of North Carolina at Chapel Hill and Duke University. Additionally, he is collaborating with colleagues conducting a similar study in Germany.

== Selected works and publications ==
Books

- Baucom, Donald H.; Snyder, Douglas K.; Dixon, Lee J. (2008). "Couple Therapy and the Treatment of Affairs". In Gurman, Alan S. (ed.). Clinical Handbook of Couple Therapy (4 ed.). NY: The Guilford Press. ISBN 978-1-59385-821-6.
- Epstein, Norman B.; Baucom, Donald H. (2007). "Couples". In Kazantzis, Nikolaos; L'Abate, Luciano (eds.). Handbook of Homework Assignments in Psychotherapy: Research, Practice, and Prevention. NY: Springer Science & Business Media. ISBN 978-0-387-29680-7.
- Snyder, Douglas K.; Baucom, Donald H.; Gordon, Kristina Coop (2007). Getting Past the Affair: A Program to Help You Cope, Heal, and Move On-Together or Apart. NY: The Guilford Press. ISBN 978-1-57230-801-5.
- Gordon, Kristina Coop; Baucom, Donald H.; Snyder, Douglas K. (2005). "Forgiveness in Couples: Divorce, Infidelity, and Couples Therapy". In Worthington, Everett L. (ed.). Handbook of Forgiveness. NY: Taylor & Francis Group. pp. 407–422. ISBN 978-0-415-94949-1.
- Baucom, Donald H.; Epstein, Norman B.; Sullivan, Laura J. (2004). "Brief Couple Therapy". In Dewan, Mantosh J.; Steenbarger, Brett N.; Greenberg, Roger P. (eds.). The Art and Science of Brief Psychotherapies: A Practitioner's Guide. Arlington, VA: American Psychiatric Publishing. pp. 189–220. ISBN 978-1-58562-067-8.
- Kerig, Patricia K.; Baucom, Donald H. (2004). Couple Observational Coding Systems. Mahwah, NJ.: Lawrence Erlbaum Associates. ISBN 978-0-8058-4357-6.
- Gordon, Kristina C.; Baucom, Donald H.; Snyder, Douglas K. (2000). "The Use of Forgiveness in Marital Therapy". In McCullough, Michael E.; Pargament, Kenneth I.; Thoresen, Carl E. (eds.). Forgiveness: Theory, Research, and Practice. NY: The Guilford Press. ISBN 978-1-57230-711-7.
- Epstein, Norman B.; Baucom, Donald H. (1998). "Cognitive-Behavioral Couple Therapy". In Dattilio, Frank M.; Goldfried, Marvin R. (eds.). Case Studies in Couple and Family Therapy: Systemic and Cognitive Perspectives. NY: The Guilford Press. pp. 37–61. ISBN 978-1-57230-696-7.
- Baucom, Donald H. (1996). in Dryden, Windy (ed.). Research in Counseling and Psychotherapy: Practical Applications. London: Sage. ISBN 978-0-8039-7841-6.
- Baucom, Donald H.; Epstein, Norman B. (1990). Cognitive-Behavioral Marital Therapy. Levittown, PA: Brunner/Mazel. ISBN 978-0-87630-558-4.
- Sher, Tamara G.; Baucom, Donald H. (1987). "Application of Marital Research and Methodology to the Study of the Family". In Hahlweg, Kurt; Goldstein, Michael J. (eds.). Understanding Major Mental Disorder: The Contribution of Family Interaction Research. NY: Family Process Press. pp. 290–313. ISBN 978-0-9615519-4-0.

Academic Journals

- Gordon, Kristina C.; Baucom, Donald H.; Snyder, Douglas K. (2004). "An Integrative Intervention for Promoting Recovery From Extramarital Affairs". Journal of Marital & Family Therapy. 30 (2): 213–231. doi:10.1111/j.1752-0606.2004.tb01235.x. PMID 15114949.
- Jacobson, Neil S.; Follette, William C.; Revenstorf, Dirk; Baucom, Donald H. (2000). "Variability in outcome and clinical significance of behavioral marital therapy: A reanalysis of outcome data". Prevention & Treatment. 3 (1). doi:10.1037/1522-3736.3.1.315a.
- Sher, T. G.; Baucom, D. H. (1993). "Marital communication: Differences among maritally distressed, depressed, and nondistressed-nondepressed couples". Journal of Family Psychology. 7 (1): 148–153. doi:10.1037/0893-3200.7.1.148.
- Sayers, S. L.; Baucom, D. H.; Sher, T. G.; Weiss, R. L.; et al. (1991). "Constructive engagement, behavioral marital therapy, and changes in marital satisfaction". Behavioral Assessment. 13 (1): 25–49.
- Sher, T. G.; Weiss, R. L. (1991). "Negativity in marital communication: Where's the beef?". Behavioral Assessment. 13 (1): 1–5.
- Baucom, D.H.; Sayers, S.L.; Sher, T.G. (1990). "Supplementing behavioral marital therapy with cognitive restructuring and emotional expressiveness training: an outcome investigation". Journal of Consulting and Clinical Psychology. 58 (5): 636–45. doi:10.1037/0022-006X.58.5.636. PMID 2254512.
- Sher, T. G.; Baucom, D. H.; Larus, J. M. (1990). "Communication patterns and response to treatment among depressed and nondepressed maritally distressed couples". Journal of Family Psychology. 4 (1): 63–79. doi:10.1037/0893-3200.4.1.63.
- Baucom, D.H.; Epstein, N.; Sayers, S.; Sher, T.G. (1989). "The role of cognitions in marital relationships: definitional, methodological, and conceptual issues". Journal of Consulting and Clinical Psychology. 57 (1): 31–8. doi:10.1037/0022-006X.57.1.31. PMID 2647801.
