= Beck Depression Inventory =

21-question multiple-choice self-report inventory

- Purpose: measure severity of depression

The Beck Depression Inventory (BDI, BDI-1A, BDI-II), created by Aaron T. Beck, is a 21-question multiple-choice self-report inventory, one of the most widely used psychometric tests for measuring the severity of depression. Its development marked a shift among mental health professionals who had, until then, viewed depression from a psychodynamic perspective, instead of it being rooted in the patient's own thoughts.

In its current version, the BDI-II is designed for individuals aged 13 and over, and is composed of items relating to symptoms of depression such as hopelessness and irritability, cognitions such as guilt or feelings of being punished, as well as physical symptoms such as fatigue, weight loss, and lack of interest in sex.

There are three versions of the BDI—the original BDI, first published in 1961 and later revised in 1978 as the BDI-1A, and the BDI-II, published in 1996. The BDI is widely used as an assessment tool by health care professionals and researchers in a variety of settings.

The BDI was used as a model for the development of the Children's Depression Inventory (CDI), first published in 1979 by clinical psychologist Maria Kovacs.

== Development and history ==
According to Beck's publisher, 'When Beck began studying depression in the 1950s, the prevailing psychoanalytic theory attributed the syndrome to inverted hostility against the self.' By contrast, the BDI was developed in a novel way for its time; by collating patients' verbatim descriptions of their symptoms and then using these to structure a scale which could reflect the intensity or severity of a given symptom.

Beck drew attention to the importance of "negative cognitions" described as sustained, inaccurate, and often intrusive negative thoughts about the self. In his view, it was the case that these cognitions caused depression, rather than being generated by depression.

Beck developed a triad of negative cognitions about the world, the future, and the self, which play a major role in depression. An example of the triad in action taken from Brown (1995) is the case of a student obtaining poor exam results:

- The student has negative thoughts about the world, so he may come to believe he does not enjoy the class.
- The student has negative thoughts about his future because he thinks he may not pass the class.
- The student has negative thoughts about his self, as he may feel he does not deserve to be in college.

The development of the BDI reflects that in its structure, with items such as "I have lost all of my interest in other people" to reflect the world, "I feel discouraged about the future" to reflect the future, and "I blame myself for everything bad that happens" to reflect the self. The view of depression as sustained by intrusive negative cognitions has had particular application in cognitive behavioral therapy (CBT), which aims to challenge and neutralize them through techniques such as cognitive restructuring.

=== BDI ===
The original BDI, first published in 1961, consisted of twenty-one questions about how the subject has been feeling in the last week. Each question had a set of at least four possible responses, ranging in intensity. For example:

- (0) I do not feel sad
- (1) I feel sad.
- (2) I am sad all the time and I can't snap out of it.
- (3) I am so sad or unhappy that I can't stand it.

When the test is scored, a value of 0 to 3 is assigned for each answer and then the total score is compared to a key to determine the depression's severity. The standard cut-off scores were as follows:

- 0–9: indicates minimal depression
- 10–18: indicates mild depression
- 19–29: indicates moderate depression
- 30–63: indicates severe depression.

Higher total scores indicate more severe depressive symptoms.

Some items on the original BDI had more than one statement marked with the same score. For instance, there are two responses under the Mood heading that score a 2: (2a) "I am blue or sad all the time and I can't snap out of it" and (2b) "I am so sad or unhappy that it is very painful".

=== BDI-IA ===
The BDI-IA was a revision of the original instrument developed by Beck during the 1970s, and copyrighted in 1978. To improve ease of use, the "a and b statements" described above were removed, and respondents were instructed to endorse how they had been feeling during the preceding two weeks. The internal consistency for the BDI-IA was good, with a Cronbach's alpha coefficient of around 0.85, meaning that the items on the inventory are highly correlated with each other. However, this version retained some flaws; the BDI-IA only addressed six out of the nine DSM-III criteria for depression. This and other criticisms were addressed in the BDI-II.

=== BDI-II ===
The BDI-II was a 1996 revision of the BDI, developed in response to the American Psychiatric Association's publication of the Diagnostic and Statistical Manual of Mental Disorders, Fourth Edition, which changed many of the diagnostic criteria for Major Depressive Disorder.

Items involving changes in body image, hypochondriasis, and difficulty working were replaced. Also, sleep loss and appetite loss items were revised to assess both increases and decreases in sleep and appetite. All but three of the items were reworded; only the items dealing with feelings of being punished, thoughts about suicide, and interest in sex remained the same. Finally, participants were asked to rate how they have been feeling for the past two weeks, as opposed to the past week as in the original BDI.

Like the BDI, the BDI-II also contains 21 questions, each answer being scored on a scale value of 0 to 3. Higher total scores indicate more severe depressive symptoms. The standardized cutoffs used differ from the original:

- 0–13: minimal depression
- 14–19: mild depression
- 20–28: moderate depression
- 29–63: severe depression.

One measure of an instrument's usefulness is to see how closely it agrees with another similar instrument that has been validated against information from a clinical interview by a trained clinician. In this respect, the BDI-II is positively correlated with the Hamilton Depression Rating Scale with a Pearson r of 0.71, showing good convergent validity. The test was also shown to have a high one-week test–retest reliability (Pearson's r = 0.93), suggesting that it was not overly sensitive to day-to-day variations in mood. The test also has high internal consistency (α = .91).

== Impact ==
The development of the BDI was an important event in psychiatry and psychology; it represented a shift in health care professionals' view of depression from a Freudian, psychodynamic perspective, to one guided by the patient's own thoughts or "cognitions". It also established the principle that instead of attempting to develop a psychometric tool based on a possibly invalid theory, self-report questionnaires when analysed using techniques such as factor analysis can suggest theoretical constructs.

The BDI was originally developed to provide a quantitative assessment of the intensity of depression. Because it is designed to reflect the depth of depression, it can monitor changes over time and provide an objective measure for judging improvement and the effectiveness or otherwise of treatment methods. The instrument remains widely used in research; in 1998, it had been used in over 2000 empirical studies. It has been translated into multiple European languages as well as Arabic, Chinese, Japanese, Persian, and Xhosa.

== Limitations ==
The BDI has the same limitations as other self-report inventories, in that scores can be easily exaggerated or minimized by the person completing them. Like all questionnaires, the way the instrument is administered can have an effect on the final score. If a patient is asked to fill out the form in front of other people in a clinical environment, for instance, social expectations have been shown to elicit a different response compared to administration via a postal survey.

In participants with concomitant physical illness the BDI's reliance on physical symptoms such as fatigue may artificially inflate scores due to symptoms of the illness, rather than of depression. In an effort to deal with this concern Beck and his colleagues developed the "Beck Depression Inventory for Primary Care" (BDI-PC), a short screening scale consisting of seven items from the BDI-II considered to be independent of physical function. Unlike the standard BDI, the BDI-PC produces only a binary outcome of "not depressed" or "depressed" for patients above a cutoff score of 4.

Although designed as a rating scale device rather than a diagnostic tool, the BDI is sometimes used by health care providers to reach a quick diagnosis.

The BDI is copyrighted; a fee must be paid for each copy used. The BDI-II is a validated and reliable depression rating scale, and public domain screening forms such as the Patient Health Questionnaire – Nine Item (PHQ-9) are screening tools and not rating scales.

== See also ==
- Beck Anxiety Inventory
- Beck Hopelessness Scale
- Diagnostic classification and rating scales used in psychiatry
- Major Depression Inventory
- Quality of Life in Depression Scale
