= Self-report inventory =

Type of psychological test

A self-report inventory is a type of psychological test in which a person fills out a survey or questionnaire with or without the help of an investigator. Self-report inventories often ask direct questions about personal interests, values, symptoms, behaviors, and traits or personality types. Inventories are different from tests in that there is no objectively correct answer; responses are based on opinions and subjective perceptions. Most self-report inventories are brief and can be taken or administered within five to 15 minutes, although some, such as the Minnesota Multiphasic Personality Inventory (MMPI), can take several hours to fully complete. They are popular because they can be inexpensive to give and to score, and their scores can often show good reliability.

There are three major approaches to developing self-report inventories: theory-guided, factor analysis, and criterion-keyed. Theory-guided inventories are constructed around a theory of personality or a prototype of a construct. Factor analysis uses statistical methods to organize groups of related items into subscales. Criterion-keyed inventories include questions that have been shown to statistically discriminate between a comparison group and a criterion group, such as people with clinical diagnoses of depression versus a control group.

Items may use any of several formats: a Likert scale with ranked options, true-false, or forced choice, although other formats such as sentence completion or visual analog scales are possible. True-false involves questions that the individual denotes as either being true or false about themselves. Forced-choice is a set of statements that require the individual to choose one as being most representative of themselves.

If the inventory includes items from different factors or constructs, the items can be mixed together or kept in groups. Sometimes the way people answer the item will change depending on the context offered by the neighboring items. Concerns have been raised about the validity of short self-report scales.

== Personality inventories ==
Self-report personality inventories include questions dealing with behaviours, responses to situations, characteristic thoughts and beliefs, habits, symptoms, and feelings. Test-takers-are usually asked to indicate how well each item describes themselves or how much they agree with each item. Formats are varied, from adjectives such as "warm", to sentences such as "I like parties", or reports of behaviour "I have driven past the speed limit" and response formats from yes/no to Likert scales, to continuous "slider" responses. Some inventories are global, such as the NEO, others focus on particular domains, such as anger or aggression.

== Limitations ==
Unlike IQ tests where there are correct answers that have to be worked out by test takers, for personality, attempts by test-takers to gain particular scores are an issue in applied testing. Test items are often transparent, and people may "figure out" how to respond to make themselves appear to possess whatever qualities they think an organization wants. In addition, people may falsify good responses, be biased towards their positive characteristics, or falsify bad, stressing negative characteristics, in order to obtain their preferred outcome. In clinical settings patients may exaggerate symptoms in order to make their situation seem worse, or under-report the severity or frequency of symptoms in order to minimize their problems. For this reason, self-report inventories are not used in isolation to diagnose a mental disorder, often used as screeners for verification by other assessment data. Many personality tests, such as the MMPI or the MBTI add questions that are designed to make it difficult for a person to exaggerate traits and symptoms. They are in common use for measuring levels of traits, or for symptom severity and change. Clinical discretion is advised for all self-report inventories.

Items may differ in social desirability, which can cause different scores for people at the same level of a trait, but differing in their desire to appear to possess socially desirable behaviors.

== Use in Research ==
Self-report inventories are widely used in psychological research. These tools enable researchers to gather subjective data efficiently from large samples, making it possible to compare the response of diverse populations to psychotherapy and track symptom changes over time. For example, a study published in 2025 analyzed data from the Outcome Questionnaire 45 from 456 clients who took 5,917 sessions of low-fee online counseling at the Sentio Counseling Center and found "sessions where the therapist reviewed the client’s OQ score beforehand (rather than after hand) showed significantly larger symptom improvement by the next session than sessions without such a review" and therapists "who reviewed client OQ scores more frequently before (rather than after) therapy sessions achieved faster client symptom recovery across all clients."

== Popular self-report inventories ==
- 16 PF
- Beck Anxiety Inventory
- Beck Depression Inventory
- Beck Hopelessness Scale
- California Psychological Inventory (CPI)
- CORE-OM
- Eysenck Personality Questionnaire (EPQ-R)
- Geriatric Depression Scale
- Major Depression Inventory
- Minnesota Multiphasic Personality Inventory
- Myers-Briggs Type Indicator
- NEO Personality Inventory (NEO-PI-3)
- Outcome Questionnaire 45
- PSYCHLOPS
- State-Trait Anxiety Inventory

== See also ==
- Self-report study
- Affect measures
- Patient-reported outcome
