= Michael J. Lambert =

American psychologist (born 1944)

Michael J. Lambert (born July 17, 1944) is an American psychologist, professor, researcher, and author whose work in psychotherapy led to the development of Routine Outcome Monitoring, which involves regularly measuring and monitoring patient-reported outcome with standardized self-report inventories throughout the course of treatment. Lambert and colleague Gary Burlingame are recognized as experts in psychotherapy outcome measurement research.
