= Common factors theory =

Theory in clinical and counseling psychology

Common factors theory, a theory guiding some research in clinical psychology and counseling psychology, proposes that different approaches and evidence-based practices in psychotherapy and counseling share common factors that account for much of the effectiveness of a psychological treatment. This is in contrast to the view that the effectiveness of psychotherapy and counseling is best explained by specific or unique factors (notably, particular methods or procedures) that are suited to treatment of particular problems.

However, according to one review, "it is widely recognized that the debate between common and unique factors in psychotherapy represents a false dichotomy, and these factors must be integrated to maximize effectiveness." In other words, "therapists must engage in specific forms of therapy for common factors to have a medium through which to operate." Common factors is one route by which psychotherapy researchers have attempted to integrate psychotherapies.

== History ==
Saul Rosenzweig started the conversation on common factors in an article published in 1936 that discussed some psychotherapies of his time. John Dollard and Neal E. Miller's 1950 book Personality and Psychotherapy emphasized that the psychological principles and social conditions of learning are the most important common factors. Sol Garfield (who would later go on to edit many editions of the Handbook of Psychotherapy and Behavior Change with Allen Bergin) included a 10-page discussion of common factors in his 1957 textbook Introductory Clinical Psychology.

In the same year, Carl Rogers published a paper outlining what he considered to be common factors (which he called "necessary and sufficient conditions") of successful therapeutic personality change, emphasizing the therapeutic relationship factors which would become central to the theory of person-centered therapy. He proposed the following conditions necessary for therapeutic change: psychological contact between the therapist and client, incongruence in the client, genuineness in the therapist, unconditional positive regard and empathic understanding from the therapist, and the client's perception of the therapist's unconditional positive regard and empathic understanding.

In 1961, Jerome Frank published Persuasion and Healing, a book entirely devoted to examining the common factors among psychotherapies and related healing approaches. Frank emphasized the importance of the expectation of help (a component of the placebo effect), the therapeutic relationship, a rationale or conceptual scheme that explains the given symptoms and prescribes a given ritual or procedure for resolving them, and the active participation of both patient and therapist in carrying out that ritual or procedure.

After Lester Luborsky and colleagues published a literature review of empirical studies of psychotherapy outcomes in 1975, the idea that all psychotherapies are effective became known as the Dodo bird verdict, referring to a scene from Alice's Adventures in Wonderland quoted by Rosenzweig in his 1936 article; in that scene, after the characters race and everyone wins, the Dodo bird says, "everybody has won, and all must have prizes." Luborsky's research was an attempt (and not the first attempt, nor the last one) to disprove Hans Eysenck's 1952 study on the efficacy of psychotherapy; Eysenck found that psychotherapy generally did not seem to lead to improved patient outcomes. A number of studies after 1975 presented more evidence in support of the general efficacy of psychotherapy, but the question of how common and specific factors could enhance or thwart therapy effectiveness in particular cases continued to fuel theoretical and empirical research over the following decades.

The landmark 1982 book Converging Themes in Psychotherapy gathered a number of chapters by different authors promoting common factors, including an introduction by Marvin R. Goldfried and Wendy Padawer, a reprint of Rosenzweig's 1936 article, and further chapters (some of them reprints) by John Dollard and Neal E. Miller, Franz Alexander, Jerome Frank, Arnold Lazarus, Hans Herrman Strupp, Sol Garfield, John Paul Brady, Judd Marmor, Paul L. Wachtel, Abraham Maslow, Arnold P. Goldstein, Anthony Ryle, and others. The chapter by Goldfried and Padawer distinguished between three levels of intervention in therapy:

1. theories of change (therapists' theories about how change occurs);
2. principles or strategies of change;
3. therapy techniques (interventions that therapists suppose will be effective).

Goldfried and Padawer argued that while therapists may talk about their theories using very different jargon, there is more commonality among skilled therapists at the (intermediate) level of principles or strategies. Goldfried and Padawer's emphasis on principles or strategies of change was an important contribution to common factors theory because they clearly showed how principles or strategies can be considered common factors (they are shared by therapists who may espouse different theories of change) and specific factors (they are manifested in particular ways within different approaches) at the same time. Around the same time, James O. Prochaska and colleagues, who were developing the transtheoretical model of change, proposed ten "processes of change" that categorized "multiple techniques, methods, and interventions traditionally associated with disparate theoretical orientations," and they stated that their processes of change corresponded to Goldfried and Padawer's level of common principles of change.

In 1986, David Orlinsky and Kenneth Howard presented their generic model of psychotherapy, which proposed that five process variables are active in any psychotherapy: the therapeutic contract, therapeutic interventions, the therapeutic bond between therapist and patient, the patient's and therapist's states of self-relatedness, and therapeutic realization.

In 1990, Lisa Grencavage and John C. Norcross reviewed accounts of common factors in 50 publications, with 89 common factors in all, from which Grencavage and Norcross selected the 35 most common factors and grouped them into five areas: client characteristics, therapist qualities, change processes, treatment structure, and therapeutic relationship. In the same year, Larry E. Beutler and colleagues published their systematic treatment selection model, which attempted to integrate common and specific factors into a single model that therapists could use to guide treatment, considering variables of patient dimensions, environments, settings, therapist dimensions, and treatment types. Beutler and colleagues would later describe their approach as "identifying common and differential principles of change".

In 1992, Michael J. Lambert summarized psychotherapy outcome research and grouped the factors of successful therapy into four areas, ordered by hypothesized percent of change in clients as a function of therapeutic factors: first, extratherapeutic change (40%), those factors that are qualities of the client or qualities of his or her environment and that aid in recovery regardless of his or her participation in therapy; second, common factors (30%) that are found in a variety of therapy approaches, such as empathy and the therapeutic relationship; third, expectancy (15%), the portion of improvement that results from the client's expectation of help or belief in the rationale or effectiveness of therapy; fourth, techniques (15%), those factors unique to specific therapies and tailored to treatment of specific problems. Lambert's research later inspired a book on common factors theory in the practice of therapy titled The Heart and Soul of Change.

In the mid-1990s, as managed care in mental health services became more widespread in the United States, more researchers began to investigate the efficacy of psychotherapy in terms of empirically supported treatments (ESTs) for particular problems, emphasizing randomized controlled trials as the gold standard of empirical support for a treatment. In 1995, the American Psychological Association's Division 12 (clinical psychology) formed a task force that developed lists of empirically supported treatments for particular problems such as agoraphobia, blood-injection-injury type phobia, generalized anxiety disorder, obsessive–compulsive disorder, panic disorder, etc. In 2001, Bruce Wampold published The Great Psychotherapy Debate, a book that criticized what he considered to be an overemphasis on ESTs for particular problems, and he called for continued research in common factors theory.

In the 2000s, more research began to be published on common factors in couples therapy and family therapy.

In 2014, a series of ten articles on common factors theory was published in the APA journal Psychotherapy. The articles emphasized the compatibility between ESTs and common factors theory, highlighted the importance of multiple variables in psychotherapy effectiveness, called for more empirical research on common factors (especially client and therapist variables), and argued that individual therapists can do much to improve the quality of therapy by rigorously using feedback measures (during treatment) and outcome measures (after termination of treatment). The article by Stefan G. Hofmann and David H. Barlow, two prominent researchers in cognitive behavioral therapy, pointed out how their recent shift in emphasis from distinct procedures for different diagnoses to a transdiagnostic approach was increasingly similar to common factors theory.

== Models ==
There are many models of common factors in successful psychotherapy process and outcome. Already in 1990, Grencavage and Norcross identified 89 common factors in a literature review, which showed the diversity of models of common factors. To be useful for purposes of psychotherapy practice and training, most models reduce the number of common factors to a handful, typically around five. Frank listed six common factors in 1971 and explained their interaction. Goldfried and Padawer listed five common strategies or principles in 1982: corrective experiences and new behaviors, feedback from the therapist to the client promoting new understanding in the client, expectation that psychotherapy will be helpful, establishment of the desired therapeutic relationship, and ongoing reality testing by the client. Grencavage and Norcross grouped common factors into five areas in 1990. Lambert formulated four groups of therapeutic factors in 1992. Joel Weinberger and Cristina Rasco listed five common factors in 2007 and reviewed the empirical support for each factor: the therapeutic relationship, expectations of treatment effectiveness, confronting or facing the problem (exposure), mastery or control experiences, and patients' attributions of successful outcome to internal or external causes.

Terence Tracy and colleagues modified the common factors of Grencavage and Norcross, and used them to develop a questionnaire which they provided to 16 board certified psychologists and 5 experienced psychotherapy researchers; then they analyzed the responses and published the results in 2003. Their multidimensional scaling analysis represented the results on a two-dimensional graph, with one dimension representing hot processing versus cool processing (roughly, closeness and emotional experience versus technical information and persuasion) and the other dimension representing therapeutic activity. Their cluster analysis represented the results as three clusters: the first related to bond (roughly, therapeutic alliance), the second related to information (roughly, the meanings communicated between therapist and client), and the third related to role (roughly, a logical structure so that clients can make sense of the therapy process).

In addition to these models that incorporate multiple common factors, a number of theorists have proposed and investigated single common factors, common principles, and common mechanisms of change, such as learning. In one example, at least three independent groups have converged on the conclusion that a wide variety of different psychotherapies can be integrated via their common ability to trigger the neurobiological mechanism of memory reconsolidation. For further examples, see § Further reading, below.

== Empirical research ==
Research by Laska et al. (2014)
Factor	% of Variability in Outcome
COMMON FACTORS
Goal consensus / collaboration	11.5%
Empathy	9.0%
Alliance	7.5%
Positive regard / affirmation	7.3%
Congruence / genuineness	5.7%
Therapist differences	5.0%
SPECIFIC INGREDIENTS
Treatment differences	< 1.0%

While many models of common factors have been proposed, they have not all received the same amount of empirical research. There is general consensus on the importance of a good therapeutic relationship in all forms of psychotherapy and counseling.

A review of common factors research in 2008 suggested that 30% to 70% of the variance in therapy outcome was due to common factors. A summary of research in 2014 suggested that 11.5% of variance in therapy outcome was due to the common factor of goal consensus/collaboration, 9% was due to empathy, 7.5% was due to therapeutic alliance, 6.3% was due to positive regard/affirmation, 5.7% was due to congruence/genuineness, and 5% was due to therapist factors. In contrast, treatment method accounted for roughly 1% of outcome variance.

Alan E. Kazdin has argued that psychotherapy researchers must not only find statistical evidence that certain factors contribute to successful outcomes; they must also be able to formulate evidence-based explanations for how and why those factors contribute to successful outcomes, that is, the mechanisms through which successful psychotherapy leads to change. Common factors theory has been dominated by research on psychotherapy process and outcome variables, and there is a need for further work explaining the mechanisms of psychotherapy common factors in terms of emerging theoretical and empirical research in the neurosciences and social sciences, just as earlier works (such as Dollard and Miller's Personality and Psychotherapy or Frank's Persuasion and Healing) explained psychotherapy common factors in terms of the sciences of their time.

One frontier for future research on common factors is automated computational analysis of clinical big data.

== Criticisms ==
There are several criticisms of common factors theory, for example:

- that common factors theory dismisses the need for specific therapeutic techniques or procedures,
- that common factors are nothing more than a good therapeutic relationship, and
- that common factors theory is not scientific.

Some common factors theorists have argued against these criticisms. They state that:

- the criticisms are based on a limited knowledge of the common factors literature,
- a thorough review of the literature shows that a coherent treatment procedure is a crucial medium for the common factors to operate,
- most models of common factors define interactions between multiple variables (including but not limited to therapeutic relationship variables), and
- some models of common factors provide evidence-based explanations for the mechanisms of the proposed common factors.
