= Developmental eclecticism =

Developmental eclecticism or systematic eclecticism is an eclectic psychotherapy framework that was developed by Gerard Egan beginning in the 1970s. It is also referred to as the skilled helper model, after the title of Egan's book The Skilled Helper.

== Development ==
Egan's eclectic model was developed amid the shift in the field of counselling and psychotherapy away from the adherence to distinct schools of therapy and toward an integration of therapies that appear to be universally effective. The framework was also influenced by the works of Carl Rogers and Robert Carkhuff, particularly these authors' theories on person-centered values and principles. Egan introduced his approach through the book The Skilled Helper, which was published in 1975. In this book, Egan explained that the framework aims to help clients to: 1) identify and explore problems and opportunities; 2) determine their needs and wants; 3) discover for themselves how to obtain them; and, 4) act based on what they learned.

== Model ==
Egan's eclectic model was first proposed as a humanistic framework but it increasingly adopted a more action-oriented form of therapy later on. Egan likened the model to the browser in the sense that, like a web browser, it can be used to mine, organize, and evaluate concepts and techniques that work for clients regardless of their background. Its eclectic orientation also means that the framework makes use of techniques regardless of their theoretical origin.

The developmental process involves three stages—exploration, understanding, and action—and each of these entails a set of associated skills. The first stage is focused on the client as the therapist attempts to build a rapport and to understanding the client's experiences and goals in the process. The stage of understanding or interpretation requires the therapist to formulate the problem using techniques such as psychodynamic and cognitive approaches. Finally, the action stage uses behavioral strategies such as homework assignments. Egan's three stages were later renamed: present scenario, preferred scenario, and getting there.
