= Terence Tracey =

American psychologist

- Occupations: Psychologist, author and researcher.

Academic background
- Education: Cornell University; University of Kansas; University of Maryland
- Thesis: The relationship of symmetrical client-therapist interaction patterns to outcome in short-term psychotherapy.

Academic work
- Institutions: Arizona State University; University of British Columbia

Terence J. G. Tracey is an American psychologist, author and researcher. He is professor emeritus of counseling and counseling psychology at Arizona State University. He is also a visiting professor at University of British Columbia. He has served in many administrative positions at Arizona State University including department head and associate dean. He is the former editor-in-chief of Journal of Counseling Psychology.

Tracey's work has been focused in four areas: client-therapist interaction in psychotherapy, interpersonal models of personality, vocational interests and academic success of minority students. He is the author of over 200 articles and book chapters.

Tracey was awarded a Lifetime Distinguished Achievement Award in Vocational Psychology from the Society for Vocational Psychology and a Lifetime Achievement Award from the Society of Promotion of Psychotherapy. He is a fellow of the American Educational Research Association, the Association for Psychological Science and the American Psychological Association. In 2008, he received the presidential citation from the American Psychological Association for "27 years of seminal research, accomplishments, and profound influence on the field of counseling psychology and social psychology." In recognition of his scientific and other lifetime contributions to the field, he was awarded the 2009 Leona Tyler Award, the highest honor conferred by the Society of Counseling Psychology.

== Early life education ==
Tracey completed his B.A in 1974 from Cornell University, majoring in psychology. He then completed his master's degree in 1977 and PhD in 1981 from the University of Kansas, Lawrence, and the University of Maryland, College Park, correspondingly. His dissertation topic was "The relationship of symmetrical client-therapist interaction patterns to outcome in short-term psychotherapy."

== Career ==
Tracey joined State University of New York at Buffalo in 1981 as an adjunct associate professor in the department of counseling and education psychology. At the same time, he became a counseling psychologist at the counseling service of the institute.

In 1983, Tracey left SUNY at Buffalo to join the University of Illinois at Urbana Champaign as an assistant professor, becoming associate professor in 1988 and full professor in 1993. In 1999, he left UIUC and joined Arizona State University. He became professor emeritus at Arizona State University in 2019.

Besides his affiliation to Arizona State University as professor emeritus, he is also a visiting professor at the University of British Columbia and an adjunct professor at University of Southern Queensland.

During his career at Arizona State University, Tracey has served in several administrative positions. He was the program leader of counseling and counseling psychology programs from 1999 to 2004 and from 2005 to 2010. He served as the interim associate dean for personnel and program at College of Education from 2001 to 2002 and as the interim senior associate dean for the Mary Lou Fulton Institute and Graduate School of Education in 2009. From 2010 to 2014, he was the faculty head of faculty of counseling and counseling psychology.

Tracey was an associate editor of Journal of Counseling Psychology from 1999 to 2005. He later served as the editor of the journal from 2011 to 2017.

Tracey has served as president and executive board member of the Society for Interpersonal Theory and Research, as an executive board member of the Council of Counseling Psychology Training Programs, as a reviewer for several funding agencies and publishers, and as chair or member of a number of professional committees.

== Research ==
In the beginning of his career, Tracey's research was focused on the psychotherapy process. His research examined the interaction of client and therapist over time and its impact on the outcome of the therapy. This work led to research on personality's impact on interpersonal interaction, which further led to research on circumplex models. He advanced a stage theory of interpersonal complementarity that prompted a burst of research on the psychotherapy relationship. Some of his research during this time also focused on academic success of minority students.

Tracey made a second major contribution through his application of quantitative methods for analyzing circular patterns in subscale data. He applied these tools to both vocational interest models and interpersonal circumplex behavior and presenting problems. His studies provided quantitative support for the conclusion that these mathematically complex models of related subscales do, in fact, behave as underlying theories predict.

Tracey developed the Personal Globe Inventory (PGI), a measure assessing occupational preferences, among other things, that is free to the public. The PGI has been translated and validated in over 20 countries and numerous international validation studies have been published in Japan, Croatia, Serbia, Ireland, China, Iran, Singapore, and the Caribbean. Tracey also developed the Inventory of Children's Activities (ICA).

== Awards and honors ==
- 1989 – Recipient of the American Educational Research Association Division E Outstanding Research Award for best article in counseling in 1987–1988.
- 1989 – Fellow, American Psychological Association, Division 17 (Counseling Psychology)
- 1991 – Fellow, American Psychological Association, Division 29 (Psychotherapy)
- 1991 – Fellow, American Psychological Society.
- 1995 – Fellow, American Association of Applied and Preventive Psychology.
- 1996 – Recipient of R. Stewart Jones award for Outstanding Teacher, Department of Educational Psychology, University of Illinois
- 1996 – Fellow, American Psychological Association, Division 5 (Evaluation, Measurement, & Statistics).
- 1997 – College of Education Senior Scholar, University of Illinois.
- 1997 – Recipient of the Thomas Magoon Distinguished Alumni Award given by the University of Maryland Counseling and Personnel Services Department.
- 1997 – Recipient of the American Educational Research Association Division E Outstanding Research Award for best research article in counseling for 1995–1996.
- 2002 – Recipient of the Faculty Member of the Year Award presented by the Arizona Psychological Association and Arizona Graduate Students in Psychology.
- 2003 – Recipient of the Arizona State University College of Education Dean's Excellence Award in Research.
- 2004 – Recipient of the Arizona State University College of Education Dean's Excellence Award in Service.
- 2004 – Recipient of the Outstanding Alumni Scholar Award of College of Education, University of Maryland.
- 2008 – Fellow of the American Educational Research Association.
- 2008 – Recipient of the American Psychological Association Presidential Citation for seminal research contribution.
- 2008 – Recipient of the Leona Tyler Award for Lifetime Distinguished Contribution to Counseling Psychology, the most prestigious award given by the Society of Counseling Psychology (American Psychological Association Division 17).
- 2011 – Honorary Member of SIO (Italian Society for Vocational guidance) because of my “research and of commitment and contribution to the field of career counseling and vocational guidance.”
- 2011 – Certified by the American Board of Professional Psychology (ABPP) in Counseling Psychology.
- 2011 – Recipient of the Lifetime Achievement Award from the Society for the Promotion of Psychotherapeutic Science, American Psychological Association.
- 2011 – Recipient of the Distinguished Achievement Award in Vocational Psychology from the Society for Vocational Psychology, American Psychological Association.
- 2012 – Recipient of the Section on Supervision and Training of APA Division 17 Outstanding Publication of the Year award for Tracey, T. J. G., Bludworth, J. & Glidden Tracey, C. E. (2012). Are there parallel processes in psychotherapy supervision? An empirical examination. Psychotherapy.
- 2017 – Research Giant. University of Southern Queensland, Toowoomba, Queensland, Australia.
- 2017 – Outstanding Doctoral Mentor, Arizona State University
- 2018 – APA Division 17 (SCP) Research Award for Jimenez-Arista, L. E. & Tracey, T.J.G., (August, 2018). Preventing child sexual abuse: Attitudes and beliefs towards psychological treatment for pedophiles. Paper presented at the annual meeting of the American Psychological Association, San Francisco.

== Selected publications ==
- Tracey, T. J. G., & Rounds, J. (1995). The arbitrary nature of Hollands RIASEC types: A concentric-circles structure. Journal of Counseling Psychology, 42(4), 431–439.
- Tracey, T. J., & Rounds, J. (1996). The Spherical Representation of Vocational Interests. Journal of Vocational Behavior, 48(1), 3–41.
- Tracey, T. J. (2002). Personal Globe Inventory: Measurement of the Spherical Model of Interests and Competence Beliefs. Journal of Vocational Behavior, 60(1), 113–172.
- Tracey, T. J., & Robbins, S. B. (2006). The interest–major congruence and college success relation: A longitudinal study. Journal of Vocational Behavior, 69(1), 64–89.
- Gupta, S., Tracey, T. J. G., & Gore, Jr., P. A. (2008). Structural examination of RIASEC scales in high school students: Variation across ethnicity and method. Journal of Vocational Behavior, 72, 1–13.
- Tracey, T. J. G. (2010). Development of an abbreviated Personal Globe Inventory using item response theory: The PGI-Short. Journal of Vocational Behavior, 76, 1–15.
- Hofsess, C. D., & Tracey, T. J. G. (2010). Countertransference as a prototype: The development of a measure. Journal of Counseling Psychology, 57, 52–67.
- Tracey, T. J. G., Bludworth, J., & Glidden-Tracey, C. E. (2012). Are there parallel processes in psychotherapy supervision? An empirical examination. Psychotherapy, 49, 330–343.
- Tracey, T. J. G., Wampold, B. E., Lichtenberg, J. W., & Goodyear, R. K. (2014). Expertise in psychotherapy: An elusive goal? American Psychologist, 69(3), 218–229.
- Xu, H, & Tracey, T. J. G. (2015). Reciprocal influence model of working alliance and therapeutic outcome over individual therapy course. Journal of Counseling Psychology, 62, 351–359.
- Tracey, T. J. G. & Caulum, D. (2015). Minimizing gender differences in children's interest assessment: Development of the Inventory of Children's Activities-3 (ICA-3). Journal of Vocational Behavior, 87, 154–160.
- Tracey, T. J. G. & Tao, C. (2018). Response latency in interest assessment: An added tool? Journal of Vocational Behavior, 108, 121-131
- Glosenberg, A., Tracey, T. J. G., Behrend, T. S., Blustein, D. L., & Foster, L. L. (2019). Person-vocation fit across the world of work: Evaluating the generalizability of the circular model of vocational interests and social cognitive career theory across 74 countries. Journal of Vocational Behavior, 112, 92–108.
