= CCRT =

CCRT is the abbreviation for:

- Cape Cod Rail Trail, paved rail trail located on Cape Cod in Massachusetts
- Centre for Cultural Resources and Training, autonomous organisation under Ministry of Culture of Government of India
- Core conflictual relationship theme, psychoanalytic tool developed by Lester Luborsky
