= APA Ethics Code =

American organizational document

The American Psychological Association (APA) Ethical Principles of Psychologists and Code of Conduct (for short, the Ethics Code, as referred to by the APA) includes an introduction, preamble, a list of five aspirational principles and a list of ten enforceable standards that psychologists use to guide ethical decisions in practice, research, and education. The principles and standards are written, revised, and enforced by the APA. The code of conduct is applicable to psychologists in a variety of areas across a variety of contexts. In the event of a violation of the code of conduct, the APA may take action ranging from termination of the APA membership to the loss of licensure, depending on the violation. Other professional organizations and licensing boards may adopt and enforce the code.

The first version was published by the APA in 1953. The need for such a document came after psychologists were taking on more professional and public roles post-World War II. A committee was developed and reviewed situations submitted by psychologists in the field who felt they had encountered ethical dilemmas. The committee organized these situations into themes and included them in the first document which was 170 pages in length. Over the years, a distinction was made between aspirational principles and enforceable standards. Since, there have been nine revisions with the most recent published in 2002 and amended in 2010 and 2016.

Despite the development and use of a complete ethical code, there have still been ethical violations and controversies. For instance, although the APA takes an explicit stance against conversion therapy, this treatment remains controversial amongst many psychologists and religious groups and is still being practiced by some. There is also some disagreement within the field about the ethical implications of using a treatment that may be less effective than another known treatment, although some psychologists argue that all therapy treatments are equally effective (see: the Dodo bird verdict). The APA has also been implicated in helping the Central Intelligence Agency to continue "enhanced interrogation techniques" of detainees under the Bush administration. This presented an obvious violation of the organization's code of ethics and has been addressed by the APA in the form of reports, responses to media outlets, amendments to policies, and rejections of the allegations.

== Content ==
=== Introduction and preamble ===
The introduction of the Ethical Principles of Psychologists and Code of Conduct is designed to describe the document's purpose. It also informs the reader of its organization, applicability, and procedural matters. The introduction states that the code applies to psychologists' scientific, educational, and professional roles, that may include "clinical psychology; counseling psychology; school psychology; research; teaching; supervision; public service; policy development; social intervention; development of assessment instruments; conducting assessments; educational counseling; organizational counseling; forensic activities; program design and evaluation; and administration," (pg. 2) The introduction also includes information on what contexts these situations apply to, including electronic and face-to-face communication. It provides information on the procedures for filing an ethical complaint, along with a description the investigation process and possible outcomes. The preamble is a description of aspirations which the American Psychological Association expects of psychologists, and reviews the main purpose for having such an ethical code.

=== General ethical principles ===
There are five general principles that serve as the ideals to which psychologists should aspire within the profession. The principles represent ethical goals but do not explicitly inform or instruct adherence to the goals; instead, the principles aim to influence and to guide professional behavior with respect to the psychologist, research subjects, students, and the individuals who seek psychological services.

==== Principle A: Beneficence and nonmaleficence ====
The beneficence and non maleficence principle of the APA general principles guides psychologists to perform work that is beneficial to others yet does not hurt anyone in the process of carrying out that work. Psychologists are to remain aware of their professional influence and the potential consequences therein on individuals and groups who seek counsel with the psychologist, especially with respect to preventing misuse or abuse, while additionally maintaining awareness of how the psychologist's own physical and mental health may influence their work. Among professional interactions and research, psychologists ought to respect and protect the rights and welfare of patients and participants.

==== Principle B: Fidelity and responsibility ====
The fidelity and responsibility principle of the APA general principles inspires psychologists to cultivate a professional and scientific environment built upon trust, accountability, and ethical considerations. Psychologists are bound to the community by way of their profession and must conduct themselves in a responsible and ethical manner while also maintaining a similar check on colleagues. Furthermore, psychologists are expected to altruistically devote some of their time to the community.

==== Principle C: Integrity ====
The integrity principle of the APA general principles aims to encourage psychologists to engage in honest, transparent practices within all aspects of the field of psychology. That is, psychologists should not engage in behavior that could be misconstrued as dishonest, exploitative, or otherwise malicious. When deception is appropriately used (most likely during psychological research), psychologists have a responsibility to mitigate the effects of its use on the overall field.

==== Principle D: Justice ====
The justice principle of the APA general principles states that people are entitled to the advances made within the field of psychology and to the services offered by professionals within the field. Furthermore, psychologists should prevent unjust practices by remaining aware of their biases, level of competence, and area and limits of expertise.

==== Principle E: Respect for people's rights and dignity ====
The APA general principle concerning respect for people's rights and dignity recognizes individuals' rights to privacy and confidentiality. Psychologists are to respect the individuals' rights while also acknowledging the worth of the individual by taking judicious precautions and engaging in positive, professional interactions, avoiding the influence of any personal bias towards the individual or group. This entails awareness of the vulnerabilities experienced by any particular population of people and necessitates understanding of and respect for diversity, including, but not limited to, factors concerning gender, race, religion, disability, and socioeconomic status.

=== Ethical standards ===
The ethical principles of psychologists and code of conduct put forth by the APA consists of ten ethical standards. The ethical standards are enforceable rules applicable for psychologists in academia and practice. These are written broadly to guide psychologists in varied areas and roles, addressing situations most psychologists may encounter in their professional roles. The types of situations include those related to resolving ethical issues, competence, human relations, privacy and confidentiality, advertising and public statements, record keeping and fees, education and training, research and publication, assessment, and therapy. The ethical standards are enforced for the benefit of the psychologists, clients, students, and other individuals that work with psychologists. Any psychologist that is a member of the APA is expected to adhere to the ethical standards. Any violation of an ethical standard may result in sanctions ranging from termination of APA membership to loss of licensure.

==== Resolving ethical issues ====
The resolving ethical issues section of the APA Ethical Standards is broadly designed to guide psychologists through a variety of ethical issues. One of the first sections describes how to approach when the work of psychologists' is misused or misrepresented, such as happens in the popular press. Psychological research is often misrepresented. Two of the sections describe how to resolve conflicts between the ethical code of psychologists and a variety of governing bodies, laws, or regulations as well as organizational demands related to working as a psychologist. There is a section related to informal resolution of ethical violations for situations where such a resolution is possible while protecting confidentiality. If the incident extends beyond being able to be resolved informally, there are guidelines for reporting ethical violations as well as working with and cooperating with ethics committees. In regards to ethical complaints, there is also a section outlining what might be considered an improper complaint. Lastly, the Resolving Ethical Issues section describes unfair discrimination against complainants and respondents to protect those involved in ethics related investigations.

==== Competence ====
The competence section of the APA Ethical Standards is designed to guide psychologists in how to define their own competence and how to approach clients or patients that might fall outside of that area of expertise. This ethical standard begins by helping psychologists define the boundaries of their own competence. The different types of mental health-related problems and potential treatments are highly varied. It is impossible for psychologists to be competent in all areas, and in fact, unethical to attempt to portray themselves as such. If a psychologist feels that he/she has not been trained to ensure competence in a specific area to treat a client, he/she should make an appropriate referral. This ethical standard also provides psychologists with guidelines on providing services in emergency situations. Although psychologists should refrain from providing service outside of their area of competence, in times of emergency the psychologist is obligated to help where possible. Psychologists are also required to maintain competence. This is usually done through the completion of continuing education credits. This standard also provides the psychologist with a basis from which to make scientific and professional judgment in an ethically consistent manner. Outlines are also provided for delegating work to others and resolving personal problems and conflicts.

==== Human relations ====
The human relations section of the APA Ethical Standards provides psychologists guidance with how to approach situations related to the process of working with people in a helping field. This section outlines how to identify and avoid unfair discrimination, sexual harassment, and other types of verbal and nonverbal harassment. These types of behavior have strong adverse influences on mental health. As such, psychologists must be particularly vigilant in identifying and avoiding these kinds of behavior. This section also outlines how to avoid harm when treating patients. Some treatments have been shown to cause harm, and as such, should be avoided. The section also provides guidance for navigating and avoiding a number of multiple relationships. Situations where a clinician has more than one relationship with the client beyond just being a client can be difficult to navigate, which can also lead to conflicts of interest, which are also covered. Guidance is also provided for how to approach requests for service from third-parties, that is, when someone other than the patient is requesting services for the said patient. Exploitative relationships are also covered and should be avoided, according to the ethical standards. This section provides guidance for cooperating with other professionals, which is often a situation faced in multi-disciplinary treatment teams. Guidance is provided for providing and obtaining informed consent for treatment. Another section outlines how to provide psychological services to or through organizations. And lastly, guidance is provided for how to navigate situations in which there is an interruption of psychological services for various reasons.

==== Privacy and confidentiality ====
The privacy and confidentiality section of the APA Ethical Standards is written to help provide psychologists with guidelines for maintaining appropriate confidentiality and respecting the privacy of the clients and patients under their care. Specific guidelines are provided for maintaining confidentiality for the psychologist's patients as well as discussing the limits of confidentiality with them. In certain situations where the safety of the patient or others is at risk, confidentiality must be broken as law enforcement needs to be motivated. Guidelines are also provided for how to ethically record therapy sessions for various reasons including training. Steps are covered for the psychologist to minimize intrusions on privacy for patients. Sections on disclosures and consultations provide guidance on how and when psychologists should disclose information and how to ethically consult with other professionals while maintaining appropriate levels of confidentiality. Lastly, this section guides psychologists on how and when to use confidential information for didactic or other purposes while protecting confidentiality of the client.

==== Advertising and other public statements ====
The advertising and other public statements section of the APA Ethical Standards is designed to guide psychologists through the process of advertising their practice and making other types of public statements. This section begins by outlining how to avoid false and deceptive statements, in specific of one's level of competence. As described in the competence section, it is unethical to provide services outside of your area of expertise. The section also outlines statements by others regarding a psychologist's work and competence. The section goes on to outline how to accurately and honestly describe workshops and non-degree granting educational programs. Media presentations and testimonials regarding one's work, and how to do so ethically and accurately, is also covered. This section also states that obtaining testimonials from past or current clients is not acceptable. The section closes by outlining how to ethically navigate situations of in-person solicitation of services.

==== Record keeping and fees ====
The record keeping and fees standard of the APA ethical standards is developed to guide psychologists in maintaining records of professional and scientific work in confidentiality. This standard states that maintaining records allow professionals to share information with other professionals if needed, help replicate research findings, and abide by the requirements of the institution and the law. In an event of an emergency, psychologists are not allowed to withhold records of clients who have failed to make payments. Psychologists are expected to arrange fees and financial arrangements in compliance with the law and accept barter only in situations that doing so, does not negatively impact the treatment. Psychologists are also expected to maintain and provide accurate reports of treatment, funding, and diagnostic details. This standard also emphasizes that psychologists should receive payment based on the services provided rather than the referral.

==== Education and training ====
The education and training standard of the APA ethical standards is designed to help psychologists create high-quality programmes that train future psychologists with appropriate knowledge and practice. Psychologists creating education and training programmes are responsible for presenting clear descriptions of the programmes, including the pre-requirements for acceptance and the requirements for completion of the programme. Psychologists are expected to teach accurate and current material supported by scientific evidence. Psychologists should not require students to disclose any personal information, unless it is listed as a programme requirement, or to evaluate whether such experiences are negatively impacting a student's performance. If individual or group therapy is a requirement of the programme, the psychologists are responsible for allowing students to attend individual or group therapy outside of the programme. Furthermore, faculty members are not allowed to provide therapy services to the students. Supervisors are required to provide timely feedback to the students and supervisees based on their performance and the requirements of the programme. Psychologists involved in the programme are prohibited from engaging in sexual relationships with students and supervisees.

==== Research and publication ====
The research and publication standard of the APA ethical standards is developed to highlight research and publication ethics that psychologists are expected to adhere to. This standard emphasizes the necessity of approval by the institute prior to carrying out the research, providing accurate information about the research study, and carrying out the research in accordance with the approval. When obtaining informed consent, details of the study should be presented to the participants, including but not limited to, the objective of the study, the procedures, benefits and potential risks associated with the study, and the participants' right to decline to participate and withdraw from the study without any penalty. However, studies which are not expected to cause any harm, such as observing in a naturalistic environment, using anonymous questionnaires, or if permitted by the law, informed consent may not be necessary to be obtained. Compensation for participation should not be used to persuade an unwilling participant. At the conclusion of the study, each participant should be presented with a summary of the study and the participant should be provided with an opportunity to ask any questions he/she has. Further, if there has been some harm caused to the participant due to participation in the study, necessary steps should be followed to minimize the harm. This standard also provides guidelines and instructions on animal research. Psychologists are responsible for reporting accurate findings and taking necessary steps to correct any errors in research and publication. Psychologists are also required to only present original data as their work and share publication credits based on the contributions rather than authority. Psychologists are also expected to be willing to share research data when required for verification, and maintain confidentiality of the participants during the review process.

==== Assessment ====
The assessment standard of the APA ethical standards is developed to broadly address guidelines on assessments. This standard states that the psychologist's views should be supported by findings from assessments, while reporting the limitations of assessments. If a viewpoint is not based on assessment results, psychologists should provide evidence to justify their judgment. Psychologists are responsible for using valid and reliable assessments that are administered in a preferred language by the client. Informed consent is expected to be obtained in accordance to the guidelines on the "Informed Consent" standard, unless the assessment is required by the law, a routine practice or required to test for the ability to make decisions. Psychologists using an interpreter are expected to obtain informed consent from the client for the use of an interpreter as well as maintain confidentiality and test security. Psychologists may refrain from releasing test data in order to protect a participant. Psychologists are also responsible for developing valid and reliable assessments and interpreting test results by taking other factors that may influence the interpretations while also indicating any limitations associated with the interpretations. Psychologists are required to be appropriately trained in order to administer assessments and are responsible for using current tests. Psychologists are also responsible for providing necessary information when outsourcing interpretation and the interpretation of test results. Psychologists are required to explain the test results to the client or other identified persons, unless otherwise specified. Psychologists are also required to maintain security and integrity in regards to all test material.

==== Therapy ====
The therapy section of the APA ethical standards is broadly written to guide psychologists through various aspects of providing psychological services. Psychologists are required to obtain informed consent from clients prior to treatment by presenting sufficient details about the therapy technique, including how established the treatment is and whether a psychologist in training will be assisting the client. When psychologists are required to provide services in a group setting, psychologists are required to identify the role of the psychologist and notify the clients of the limitations of confidentiality. If a psychologist is required to provide services for a client already receiving mental health services from another professional, the psychologist is required to discuss with the client or other identified persons to minimize conflict and harm. Psychologists should not engage in sexual relationships with current clients or with those closely related to clients. Psychologists should not be sexually engaged with past clients within two years of termination and even after two years of termination, psychologists will have to provide enough details to ensure that this ethical standard is not violated by being involved with a past client. In the event of a termination of employment, necessary steps should be taken in order to ensure client care. Termination of therapy should occur when the client shows significant improvements, does not benefit further from treatment, is being harmed by the treatment, or the clinician is threatened by the client or a person related to the client. Psychologists are expected to prepare clients for termination and provide sources for alternative services.

== History ==
=== Origins ===
"These rules should do much more than help the unethical psychologist keep out of trouble; they should be of palpable aid to the ethical psychologist in making daily decisions." —Nicholas Hobbs (1948, p. 81)

The first committee on Ethical Standards for Psychologists was developed in 1947 and chaired by Edward Tolman. The committee was created because psychologists were becoming more involved in professional activities and public works during and following World War II. To gain insight on what to include, the committee sought information from psychologists in the field. Psychologists discussed situations in which they felt they encountered ethical dilemmas.

A second committee was formed and headed by Nicholas Hobbs. This 8-member committee was responsible for the creation of the first document. The committee used contributions from over 2,000 psychologists to create the first principles. The committee reviewed the situations submitted by psychologists to the first committee and attempted to organize the situations into themes. Themes that emerged reflected many of the political and social issues of the time including racial segregation, post-war politics, and the testing industry. The first version of the Ethical Standards of Psychologists was adopted in 1952 and published in 1953 by the American Psychological Association (APA). The document was over 170 pages in length. The first version contained many ethical dilemmas that psychologists had written about and submitted to the first committee as case examples.

=== Revision history ===
Revisions to the 1953 version continued over the decades until the most recent version which was published in 2002 and amended in 2010 and 2016. Each revision has been guided by a set of objectives put forth by Hobbs in 1948: "to express the best ethical practices in the field as judged by a large representative sample of members of the APA; to reflect an explicit value system as well as clearly articulated decisional and behavioral rules; to be applicable to the full range of activities and role relationships encountered in the work of psychologists; to have the broadest possible participation among psychologists in its development and revisions; and to influence the ethical conduct of psychologists by meriting widespread identification and acceptance among members of the discipline".

Revisions occurred over the years pertaining to many changes in society. Culture, politics, the legal system, the economy and the healthcare system have all been influential in the development of the past and current ethical codes. The case examples were also removed. Prior to 1981, there was no principle or standard that addressed conflict between law and ethics. One of the biggest changes occurred with the 1992 version of the code. Before this version, there was no distinction between principles and standards. This version was the first to make that distinction. The principles are considered to be aspirational while the standards are enforceable by agencies adopting them, including the APA.

The current version of the code was developed in 2002, became effective in 2003, and was amended in 2010 and 2016. In 2010, amendments were made to the Introduction and Applicability Sections along with Standard 1.02 Conflicts Between Ethics and Law, Regulations, or Other Governing Legal Authority and Standard 1.03 Conflicts Between Ethics and Organizational Demands. In 2016, paragraph (b) was added to Standard 3.04, which added the explicit proscription against torture and "any other cruel, inhuman, or degrading behavior".

Previous revisions with changes indicated:

- American Psychological Association. (1953). Ethical standards of psychologists. Washington, DC: Author. (first version; no reference to legal standards)
- American Psychological Association. (1959). Ethical standards of psychologists. American Psychologist, 14, 279-282. (change to Principle 3: Moral and Legal Standards)
- American Psychological Association. (1963). Ethical standards of psychologists. American Psychologist, 18, 56-60. (no change in language)
- American Psychological Association. (1968). Ethical standards of psychologists. American Psychologist, 23, 357-361. (no change in language)
- American Psychological Association. (1977, March). Ethical standards of psychologists. APA Monitor, 22-23. (change to Principle 3: Moral and Legal Standards)
- American Psychological Association. (1979). Ethical standards of psychologists. Washington, DC: Author. (no change in language)
- American Psychological Association. (1981). Ethical principles of psychologists. American Psychologist, 36, 633-638. (change to Principle 3: Moral and Legal Standards)
- American Psychological Association. (1990). Ethical principles of psychologists (Amended June 2, 1989). American Psychologist, 45, 390-395. (no change in language)
- American Psychological Association. (1992). Ethical principles of psychologists and code of conduct. American Psychologist, 47, 1597-1611. (change to Introduction to the 1992 Ethics Code (paragraph 5) (aspirational); change to Ethical Standard 1.02 Relationship of Ethics and Law (enforceable))
- American Psychological Association. (2002). Ethical principles of psychologists and code of conduct (Amended February 20, 2010). American Psychologist, 57, 1060-1073. (change to Introduction and Applicability (paragraph 7) (aspirational); change to 1.02 Conflicts Between Ethics and Law, Regulations, or Other Governing Legal Authority (enforceable))
