= Saul Rosenzweig =

American psychologist and therapist

Saul Rosenzweig (1907–2004) was an American psychologist and therapist who studied subjects such as repression, psychotherapy, and aggression. Rosenzweig, who, with a co-author, has been credited with being the first to attempt to "elicit repression" in a laboratory setting, became well known after publishing a paper discussing "common factors" underlying competing approaches to psychotherapy.

== Biography ==
Rosenzweig, a friend and classmate of B.F. Skinner, earned his doctorate from Harvard College in 1932. He worked at Worcester State Hospital and Clark University before becoming the chief psychologist at the Western State Psychiatric Institute.

Rosenzweig taught at Washington University in St. Louis from 1948 until he retired in 1975. He died on August 9, 2004, at the age of 97.

== Work ==
In the 1930s, Rosenzweig studied repression. With G. Mason, Rosenzweig criticized H. Meltzer's survey of studies of repression in an article published in the British Journal of Psychology. Rosenzweig and Mason argued that the studies reviewed by Meltzer worked with sensory stimuli unrelated to the theory of repression, and "failed to develop under laboratory control the experiences which are subsequently to be tested for recall." Donald W. MacKinnon and William F. Dukes credit Rosenzweig and Mason with being "the first to make an explicit attempt to elicit repression under conditions of laboratory control and observation." Sigmund Freud was sent reprints of Rosenzweig's attempts to study repression, but replied to Rosenzweig that while he had examined his "experimental studies for the verification of the psychoanalytic assertions with interest" he could not "put much value on these confirmations because the wealth of reliable observations on which these assertions rest make them independent of experimental verification."

Rosenzweig became well known after publishing a paper discussing "common factors" underlying competing approaches to psychotherapy. He argued that all models of therapy could be equally successful, due to competent therapists sharing common factors that aided their patients. His premise became known as the Dodo Bird Verdict or Dodo Bird Hypothesis—a reference to Lewis Carroll's Alice's Adventures in Wonderland (1865), in which a dodo bird declares at the end of a race designed to dry everyone off: "Everybody has won and all must have prizes."

Rosenzweig's study of aggression led to the development of the Rosenzweig Picture-Frustration Study, a test of latent hostility. The Rosenzweig Picture Frustration Study is usually considered a semi-projective technique and involves an examinee responding verbally to a semi-ambiguous picture scenario. Each of the three forms (child, adolescent, and adult) consists of 24 comic strip pictures that portray a situation that might induce frustration. The overall purpose of the study is to assess how the examinee responds to frustration and frustrating situations. The test assumes that the way that the examinee responds to each frustrating situation depicts how they behave in the face of frustration. The worth of this test is based on how aggression is conceptualized into three types. The first direction of aggression can be extragressive meaning that it is turned onto the environment. The second direction is intraggressive meaning that it is turned by the examinee onto the self. The final direction is imaggressive which means that it is evaded in an attempt to gloss over the frustration. In terms of reliability and validity, the P-F Study interscorer reliability is in the range of .80 to .85. The test-retest reliability is fair to marginal. The test became popular in Europe and was featured in Stanley Kubrick's film A Clockwork Orange (1971).

A collection of Rosenzweig's papers has been maintained in the Archives of the History of American Psychology, at the University of Akron. This comprises a collection of papers from 1929 to 2003, in five series:

1. Correspondence
2. Foundation for Idiodynamics Personality Theory, and Creativity in Literature
3. Psychoarchaeology
4. Sexology
5. Reprints
