= Michael J. Mahoney (psychologist) =

American psychologist

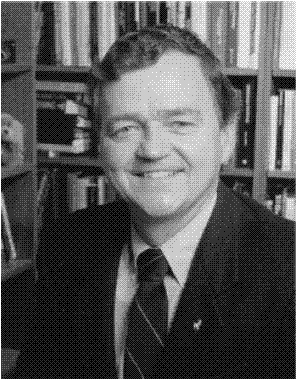
- Born: February 22, 1946; Streator, IL
- Died: May 31, 2006 (aged 60)
- Education: Stanford University (Ph.D., 1972)
- Known for: Cognitive behavioral therapy Constructivist psychotherapy Sports psychology
- Awards: Fulbright Award (1984)
- Scientific career
- Fields: Psychology
- Workplaces: Pennsylvania State University; University of California, Santa Barbara; University of North Texas

Michael J. Mahoney (1946 – 2006) was an American psychologist, one of the founders of cognitive behavioral therapy and a leading contributor to constructivist psychotherapy.

Mahoney also contributed to the field of sports psychology and served as a consultant to the United States Olympic Committee.

== Career ==
A prolific academic, Mahoney published over 250 scholarly articles and chapters. Among his 19 authored and edited books, his most influential books were Cognition and Behavior Modification and Constructive Psychotherapy: Theory and Practice.

In 1981, he was featured in a full page New York Times article titled Two Theories That Never Met Move Toward a Convergence. along with Paul L. Wachtel.

== Research ==
=== Human Change Processes ===
The study of human change processes is a central theme in Mahoney’s work. At the core of this research, Mahoney emphasizes the dynamic tensions between stability and growth inherent within these processes. While optimistic about the possibilities of change, he emphasizes that it is rarely painless or fast, often requiring “rupture and repairs to the very fabric of our lives.” The following synopsis on Mahoney’s research in this area will focus on (1) the oscillatory process of change, (2) the self-protective theory of resistance, and (3) the role of core ordering processes in significant, sustained change.

Mahoney sees change as a complex, non-linear and oscillatory process. He explains this oscillatory process through a two-dimensional framework of expansion-contraction and passivity-activity that brings attention to the fluctuation of “effort and surrender” within our psychological development. Mahoney argues that there are times when effort can “get in the way of progress,” and surrendering to familiar patterns plays a role in the change process. Oscillations between these dimensions are described as “normal parts of a healthy and self-protective process that is attempting to balance individual needs for coherence (familiarity) and challenge (novelty).” For example, in active-expansion, the person actively explores and experiments with new possibilities (e.g. enrolling in a course to learn a new skill). In contrast, passive-contraction involves withdrawal into what is familiar (e.g. declining new opportunities). This dimensional framework can be used as a therapeutic tool to normalize periods of contraction and passivity rather than viewing them as a problem or failure.

Mahoney’s self-protective theory of resistance is central in explaining why we often oscillate back to familiar patterns that we are striving to change. He argues that our reluctance to change has “survival value in protecting and perpetuating old reality constructions.” In other words, resistance is a healthy response to preserve our sense of identity and to manage a pace of change that avoids destabilizing the self. Mahoney’s conceptualisation of resistance differs from a psychoanalytic understanding in that he does not see resistance as a self-defeating dynamic related to death-seeking tendencies. Instead, Mahoney sees resistance as serving the individual’s need to feel “safe, secure and viable” — a protective rather than pathological function. He advocates working with resistance through patience, compassion and respecting each person’s unique pace of change.

Given that resistance serves to protect our sense of self, we are most resistant to changes in what Mahoney calls our core ordering processes—the fundamental ways we organize and interpret our experiences and sense of self. Mahoney identifies four interdependent dimensions within these core ordering processes: reality (how we interpret events), self (how we perceive ourselves), emotion (emotional state and involvement), and power (our sense of agency and influence over our lives). For instance, within the self dimension, perceiving yourself as ‘good-for-nothing’ can influence your interpretation of events: “I wasn’t hired for that job because the boss sees that I have nothing to offer” instead of “The job market is very competitive.” Because these dimensions are at the root of how we experience the world and ourselves, transforming them is what creates significant long-term change. Here, Mahoney stresses the highly individual nature of change, and that the therapist must respond creatively and flexibly to each client’s unique self and situation.

== Awards ==
He received a Fulbright Award in 1984.
