= Integrative psychotherapy =

Integration of different methods of psychotherapy

Integrative psychotherapy is the integration of elements from different schools of psychotherapy in the treatment of a client. Integrative psychotherapy may also refer to the psychotherapeutic process of integrating the personality: uniting the "affective, cognitive, behavioral, and physiological systems within a person".

== Background ==
Initially, Sigmund Freud developed a talking cure called psychoanalysis; then he wrote about his therapy and popularized psychoanalysis. After Freud, many different disciplines splintered off. Some of the more common therapies include: psychodynamic psychotherapy, transactional analysis, cognitive behavioral therapy, gestalt therapy, body psychotherapy, family systems therapy, person-centered psychotherapy, and existential therapy. Hundreds of different theories of psychotherapy are practiced.

A new therapy is born in several stages. After being trained in an existing school of psychotherapy, the therapist begins to practice. Then, after follow up training in other schools, the therapist may combine the different theories as a basis of a new practice. Then, some practitioners write about their new approach and label this approach with a new name.

A pragmatic or a theoretical approach can be taken when fusing schools of psychotherapy. Pragmatic practitioners blend a few strands of theory from a few schools as well as various techniques; such practitioners are sometimes called eclectic psychotherapists and are primarily concerned with what works. Alternatively, other therapists consider themselves to be more theoretically grounded as they blend their theories; they are called integrative psychotherapists and are not only concerned with what works, but also why it works.

For example, an eclectic therapist might experience a change in their client after administering a particular technique and be satisfied with a positive result. In contrast, an integrative therapist is curious about the "why and how" of the change as well. A theoretical emphasis is important: for example, the client may only have been trying to please the therapist and was adapting to the therapist rather than becoming more fully empowered in themselves.

Recent developments in integrative psychotherapy highlight the use of structured treatment frameworks that organize therapy into phases, combining cognitive-behavioral, experiential, and relational strategies. These phased approaches aim to address enduring patterns rather than isolated symptoms, promoting continuity and measurable outcomes.

== Different routes to integration ==
The most recent edition of the Handbook of Psychotherapy Integration (Norcross & Goldfried, 2005) recognized four general routes to integration: common factors, technical eclecticism, theoretical integration, and assimilative integration.

=== Common factors ===
The first route to integration is called common factors and "seeks to determine the core ingredients that different therapies share in common". The advantage of a common factors approach is the emphasis on therapeutic actions that have been demonstrated to be effective. The disadvantage is that common factors may overlook specific techniques that have been developed within particular theories. Common factors have been described by Jerome Frank, Bruce Wampold, and Miller, Duncan and Hubble (2005). Common factors theory asserts it is precisely the factors common to the most psychotherapies that make any psychotherapy successful.

Some psychologists have converged on the conclusion that a wide variety of different psychotherapies can be integrated via their common ability to trigger the neurobiological mechanism of memory reconsolidation.

=== Technical eclecticism ===
The second route to integration is technical eclecticism which is designed "to improve our ability to select the best treatment for the person and the problem…guided primarily by data on what has worked best for others in the past". The advantage of technical eclecticism is that it encourages the use of diverse strategies without being hindered by theoretical differences. A disadvantage is that there may not be a clear conceptual framework describing how techniques drawn from divergent theories might fit together. The most well known model of technical eclectic psychotherapy is Arnold Lazarus' (2005) multimodal therapy. Another model of technical eclecticism is Larry E. Beutler and colleagues' systematic treatment selection. фтйо

=== Theoretical integration ===
The third route to integration commonly recognized in the literature is theoretical integration in which "two or more therapies are integrated in the hope that the result will be better than the constituent therapies alone". Some models of theoretical integration focus on combining and synthesizing a small number of theories at a deep level, whereas others describe the relationship between several systems of psychotherapy. One prominent example of theoretical synthesis is Paul L. Wachtel's model of cyclical psychodynamics that integrates psychodynamic, behavioral, and family systems theories. Another example of synthesis is Anthony Ryle's model of cognitive analytic therapy, integrating ideas from psychoanalytic object relations theory and cognitive psychotherapy. Another model of theoretical integration is specifically called integral psychotherapy (Forman, 2010; Ingersoll & Zeitler, 2010). The most notable model describing the relationship between several different theories is the transtheoretical model.

=== Assimilative integration ===
Assimilative integration is the fourth route and acknowledges that most psychotherapists select a theoretical orientation that serves as their foundation but, with experience, incorporate ideas and strategies from other sources into their practice. "This mode of integration favors a firm grounding in any one system of psychotherapy, but with a willingness to incorporate or assimilate, in a considered fashion, perspectives or practices from other schools". Some counselors may prefer the security of one foundational theory as they begin the process of integrative exploration. Formal models of assimilative integration have been described based on a psychodynamic foundation, and based on cognitive behavioral therapy.

Govrin (2015) pointed out a form of integration, which he called "integration by conversion", whereby theorists import into their own system of psychotherapy a foreign and quite alien concept, but they give the concept a new meaning that allows them to claim that the newly imported concept was really an integral part of their original system of psychotherapy, even if the imported concept significantly changes the original system. Govrin gave as two examples Heinz Kohut's novel emphasis on empathy in psychoanalysis in the 1970s and the novel emphasis on mindfulness and acceptance in "third-wave" cognitive behavioral therapy in the 1990s to 2000s.

=== Other models that combine routes ===
In addition to well-established approaches that fit into the five routes mentioned above, there are newer models that combine aspects of the traditional routes.

Clara E. Hill's (2014) three-stage model of helping skills encourages counselors to emphasize skills from different theories during different stages of helping. Hill's model might be considered a combination of theoretical integration and technical eclecticism. The first stage is the exploration stage. This is based on client-centered therapy. The second stage is entitled insight. Interventions used in this stage are based on psychoanalytic therapy. The last stage, the action stage, is based on behavioral therapy.

Good and Beitman (2006) described an integrative approach highlighting both core components of effective therapy and specific techniques designed to target clients' particular areas of concern. This approach can be described as an integration of common factors and technical eclecticism.

Multitheoretical psychotherapy is an integrative model that combines elements of technical eclecticism and theoretical integration. Therapists are encouraged to make intentional choices about combining theories and intervention strategies.

An approach called integral psychotherapy is grounded in the work of theoretical psychologist and philosopher Ken Wilber (2000), who integrates insights from contemplative and meditative traditions. Integral theory is a meta-theory that recognizes that reality can be organized from four major perspectives: subjective, intersubjective, objective, and interobjective. Various psychotherapies typically ground themselves in one of these four foundational perspectives, often minimizing the others. Integral psychotherapy includes all four. For example, psychotherapeutic integration using this model would include subjective approaches (cognitive, existential), intersubjective approaches (interpersonal, object relations, multicultural), objective approaches (behavioral, pharmacological), and interobjective approaches (systems science). By understanding that each of these four basic perspectives all simultaneously co-occur, each can be seen as essential to a comprehensive view of the life of the client. Integral theory also includes a stage model that suggests that various psychotherapies seek to address issues arising from different stages of psychological development.

The generic term, integrative psychotherapy, can be used to describe any multi-modal approach which combines therapies. For example, an effective form of treatment for some clients is psychodynamic psychotherapy combined with hypnotherapy. Kraft & Kraft (2007) gave a detailed account of this treatment with a 54-year-old female client with refractory IBS in a setting of a phobic anxiety state. The client made a full recovery and this was maintained at the follow-up a year later.

== Comparison with eclecticism ==
In Integrative and Eclectic Counselling and Psychotherapy, the authors make clear the distinction between integrative and eclectic psychotherapy approaches: "Integration suggests that the elements are part of one combined approach to theory and practice, as opposed to eclecticism which draws ad hoc from several approaches in the approach to a particular case." Psychotherapy's eclectic practitioners are not bound by the theories, dogma, conventions or methodology of any one particular school. Instead, they may use what they believe or feel or experience tells them will work best, either in general or suiting the often immediate needs of individual clients; and working within their own preferences and capabilities as practitioners.

== See also ==
- Integrative body psychotherapy
- Journal of Psychotherapy Integration
