= Eclectic psychotherapy =

Psychotherapy using multiple techniques

Eclectic psychotherapy is a form of psychotherapy in which the clinician uses more than one theoretical approach, or multiple sets of techniques, to help with clients' needs. The use of different therapeutic approaches will be based on the effectiveness in resolving the patient's problems, rather than the theory behind each therapy.

== Background ==
Over the history of clinical psychology, many therapeutic approaches have been created as stand-alone methods. Eclectic psychotherapy, which involves using multiple therapeutic methods, attempts to avoid the dilemma of choosing one method by utilizing multiple approaches.

Therapists may be trained in one particular method or theoretical orientation, but may shift to a more eclectic approach, adding other methods to their original training. A therapist can also be trained as eclectic. Psychotherapists-in-training are typically exposed to a variety of different methods and theories.

Eclectic psychotherapy might include using a behavior modification approach for one symptom and a psychoanalytic approach for a second symptom. An eclectic psychotherapist may use one mode of treatment for one patient and a different one for another patient.

== Types ==
=== Overview ===
All of the following listed types of psychotherapies are different forms of eclectic psychotherapies. The decision to use or not use each form may be based upon therapist preference, patient preference or effectiveness for certain presenting problems.

=== Brief ===
Brief eclectic psychotherapy, as the name suggests, is a short-term form of psychotherapy using an eclectic approach. It often consists of a combination of cognitive-behavioral and psychodynamic approaches over a limited number of sessions, often sixteen or fewer. The term brief eclectic psychotherapy may be defined in several different ways, but is generally regarded as just short-term eclectic psychotherapy. One specific form of brief eclectic therapy is brief eclectic therapy for traumatic grief (BEP-TG). Posttraumatic stress disorder (PTSD), major depressive disorder (MDD), and persistent complex bereavement disorder (PCBD) can all be treated with BEP-TG.

=== Systematic ===
When using the systematic eclectic psychotherapy approach developed by Larry E. Beutler and colleagues in the early 1990s, the therapist bases their choice of treatment method on four key factors: client characteristics, the context of treatment, relationship variables, and specific strategies and techniques "that will maximally focus on relevant problems, manage levels of client motivation, overcome obstacles to successful resolution of problems, achieve treatment objectives, consolidate treatment gains, and prevent or reduce relapse". Unlike brief eclectic psychotherapy, there is not necessarily a limit on the number of sessions. The therapist chooses the approach that he or she believes will be most helpful to the patient based on evaluation of the four factors.

=== Prescriptive ===
The focus of prescriptive eclectic psychotherapy, described in 1978 by Richard E. Dimond and colleagues, is to create a personalized treatment plan for each client that is based on a combination of different theories and techniques, while sticking to a structure that is based on research. The therapy allows the therapist to use multiple theoretical approaches, but must be rooted in evidence from psychological research. The psychotherapist must not only choose the type of psychotherapy used, but also the type of therapeutic relationship that should be utilized. There is a great emphasis on using clinical research and prior clinical knowledge in determining how to move forward with treatment.

=== Technical ===
Technical eclectic psychotherapy focuses only on using multiple techniques and ignores the theoretical background of those techniques. In this form of eclectic therapy, the therapist uses a variety of techniques based on what is expected to help the patient. Theory is not considered an important factor in this approach, as only the techniques used matter. Depending on the techniques selected by the therapist, the methods of treatment may come from similar psychological schools of thought or completely opposite ones. One form of technical eclectic psychotherapy is multimodal therapy, developed by Arnold Lazarus starting in the 1960s.

== Comparison with integrative psychotherapy ==
The terms integrative psychotherapy and eclectic psychotherapy are sometimes used interchangeably, but the two terms are not synonymous. The American Psychological Association lists the two types of therapies as unique and different types of psychotherapies. Both eclectic and integrative psychotherapy combine the use of multiple psychological theories. Integrative psychotherapy tends to place greater emphasis on the theories being combined, while eclectic therapy tends to be more outcome focused. An eclectic psychotherapist will use whatever theory will help their patient and an integrative psychotherapist will use one theory to complement another.

== See also ==
- Developmental eclecticism
