= Multitheoretical psychotherapy =

Multitheoretical psychotherapy (MTP) is a new approach to integrative psychotherapy developed by Jeff E. Brooks-Harris and his colleagues at the University of Hawaii at Manoa. MTP is organized around five principles for integration:

1. Intentional
2. Multidimensional
3. Multitheoretical
4. Strategy-based
5. Relational

Being intentional involves making informed choices about the focus of treatment, theoretical conceptualization, intervention strategies, and relational stances.

MTP encourages counselors to think in a multidimensional manner, recognizing the rich interaction between thoughts, actions, and feelings within the context of biology, interpersonal patterns, social systems, and cultural contexts.

MTP uses a multitheoretical framework to organize training and treatment. Psychotherapists can use a combination of theories to formulate a multitheoretical conceptualization to understand clients and guide interventions. The combination of theorical ideas and interventions is based on the individual needs of clients.

MTP encourages therapists to work interactively with thoughts, actions, and feelings:

- Cognitive strategies are used to encourage functional thoughts
- Behavioral interventions promote effective actions
- Experiential-humanistic skills can be used to explore adaptive feelings and personal experiences.

Counselors are also encouraged to use theories that explore contextual dimensions that shape thinking, acting, and feeling

- Biopsychosocial strategies focus on biology and result in adaptive health practices
- Psychodynamic-interpersonal interventions are used to understand and modify interpersonal patterns
- Systemic-constructivist skills are used to explore family and social systems and encourage adaptive personal narratives
- Multicultural-feminist strategies encourage clients to adapt to cultural contexts and overcome oppression

MTP training involves building a repertoire of key strategies drawn from different theoretical approaches. Key strategies have been described using strategy markers (suggesting when a particular skill will be most useful) and expected consequences (predicting the likely outcome of a specific intervention). Training also involves learning how to combine ideas and strategies from different theories based on the individual needs of clients. Integrative treatment planning involves conducting a multidimensional survey, establishing an interactive focus on two or three dimensions, formulating a multitheoretical conceptualization, and choosing intervention strategies corresponding to focal dimensions. The Brooks-Harris (2008) text describes applications of MTP to depression, anxiety, substance abuse, and health problems.

As a second-generation model of integrative psychotherapy, MTP combines features of earlier approaches. Like Arnold Lazarus' multimodal therapy, MTP encourages attention to the interaction of different dimensions. Like Prochaska and DiClemente's transtheoretical model, MTP describes the relationship between several different theories. Like Larry E. Beutler's systematic treatment selection, MTP predicts when particular strategies will be most useful.
