= Gerard Egan =

American psychologist (born 1930)

- Born: June 17, 1930 (age 96); Chicago, Illinois, U.S.
- Education: Loyola Academy; Loyola University Chicago (B.A.)
- Occupations: Psychologist and educator
- Organizations: Loyola University Chicago
- Notable work: The Skilled Helper

Gerard Egan (born June 17, 1930) is an American psychologist and educator, who is a professor emeritus at Loyola University of Chicago.

== Biography ==
Egan was born in Chicago, Illinois, on June 17, 1930, graduated from Loyola Academy, Chicago, in June 1948 and from Loyola University, in June 1953, with a Bachelor of Arts degree. He studied philosophy at West Baden College in Indiana, then a Jesuit seminary linked to Loyola University, and received a Licentiate in Philosophy in June 1955. From September 1966 to June 1967, he taught French and Spanish at St. Ignatius High School, Chicago, and began teaching philosophy at Loyola University in September 1968.

He later served as Professor of Organization Studies and Psychology and Programme Director for Loyola's Centre for Organization Development.

The eleventh edition of his well-known book, The Skilled Helper, was published in 2018. Other books in the fields of counseling and communication include Interpersonal Living, People in Systems (with Michael Cowan), TalkWorks: How to Get More Out of Life Through Better Conversations (with Andrew Bailey), and TalkWorks at Work: How to Become a Better Communicator and Make the Most of Your Career (with Andrew Bailey). The Skilled Helper is considered the most widely used counseling text worldwide.

In Egan's Stakeholders in Change model, stakeholders are divided into nine categories reflecting their attitude to the change and the person promoting the change (the "change agent"):

- Partners
- Allies
- Fellow travelers
- Bedfellows
- Fence sitters
- Loose cannons
- Opponents
- Adversaries
- The voiceless

In Egan's work on the "shadow side" of organizations, he defined the shadow side as:

All those things that substantially and consistently affect the productivity and quality of the working life of a business, for better or worse, but which are not found on organisation charts, in company manuals, or in the discussions that take place in formal meetings.

== See also ==
- Developmental eclecticism – the counselling framework from Egan's The Skilled Helper
