= Transdiagnostic process =

Proposed psychological mechanism

A transdiagnostic process is a proposed psychological mechanism underlying and connecting a group of mental disorders.

== History ==
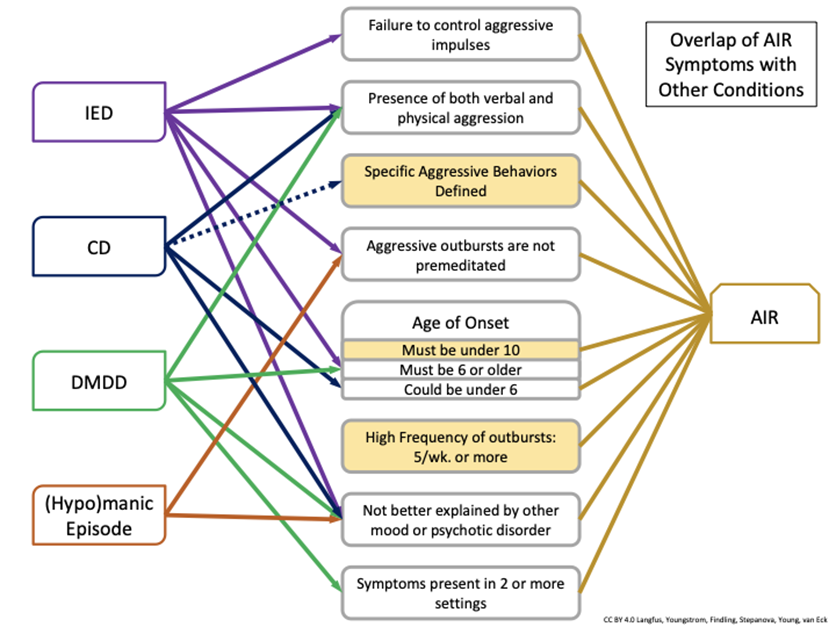
Example of differential diagnosis

Over the last two centuries, western mental health science has focused on nosology whereby panels of experts identify hypothetical sets of signs and symptoms, label, and compile them into taxonomies such as the Diagnostic and Statistical Manual of Mental Disorders. While this is one of the approaches that has historically driven progress in medicine, such taxonomies have long been controversial on grounds including bias, diagnostic reliability and potential conflicts of interest amongst their promoters. Over-reliance on taxonomy may have created a situation where its benefits are now outweighed by the fragmentation and constraints it has caused in the training of mental health practitioners, the range of treatments they can provide under insurance cover, and the scope of new research.

To date, no biological marker or individual cognitive process has been associated with a unique mental diagnosis but rather such markers and processes seem implicated across many diagnostic categories. For these reasons, researchers have recently begun to investigate mechanisms through which environmental factors such as poverty, discrimination, loneliness, aversive parenting, and childhood trauma or maltreatment might act as causes of many disorders and which therefore might point towards interventions that could help many people affected by them. Research suggests that transdiagnostic processes may underlie multiple aspects of cognition including attention, memory/imagery, thinking, reasoning, and behavior.

== Examples ==
=== Transdiagnostic processes well-supported by evidence ===
While an exhaustive, confirmed list of transdiagnostic processes does not yet exist, relatively strong evidence exists for processes including:

- Selective attention to external stimuli
- Selective attention to internal stimuli
- Avoidance behavior: distracting ourselves or deliberately not entering feared situations, thereby blocking the opportunity to disconfirm negative beliefs.
- Safety behavior: habitual behaviors we execute because we believe they will help us to avoid something we fear (for example, vomiting, dieting or excessive exercise to avoid weight gain)
- Experiential avoidance
- Explicit selective memory
- Recurrent memory
- Interpretation reasoning: how we reach conclusions regarding the meaning of ambiguous or open-ended situations.
- Expectancy reasoning: predicting likely future events and outcomes that may follow specific actions or situations.
- Emotional reasoning
- Recurrent thinking
- Positive and negative metacognitive beliefs: beliefs we have about our own thinking processes.

=== Possible additional transdiagnostic processes ===
Processes supported by growing evidence include:

- Implicit selective memory
- Overgeneral memory
- Avoidant encoding and retrieval
- Attributions: inferring causes for the outcomes we perceive
- Detecting covariation: detecting events that tend to co-occur regularly and consistently
- Hypothesis testing and data gathering: evaluating if currently held explanations and beliefs seem accurate or need revision
- Recurrent negative thinking: worry and rumination that dwells on intrusive thoughts in an effort to work through or resolve them.
- Thought suppression: deliberately trying to block or remove specific intrusive mental images or urges from entering consciousness, which may have the paradoxical effect of sustaining the thought.

== Implications ==
Transdiagnostic processes suggest interventions to help people suffering from mental disorders. For example, helping someone to view thoughts as mental events in a wider context of awareness, rather than as expressions of external reality, may enable someone to step back from those thoughts and to see them as ideas to be tested rather than unchangeable facts. If research can identify a relatively limited number of transdiagnostic processes, people facing a wide range of mental difficulties might be helped by practitioners trained to master a relatively limited number of techniques corresponding to those underlying processes, rather than requiring many specialists who are each an expert in treating a single specific disorder.

Transdiagnostic processes also suggest mechanisms through which delusions and cognitive biases may be understood. For example, the process of detecting covariation can lead to illusory correlations between unrelated stimuli, and the process of hypothesis testing and data gathering is generally subject to confirmation bias, meaning existing beliefs are not updated in the light of conflicting new information.

== See also ==
- Cognitive behavioral therapy § Unified Protocol
- Common factors theory – common principles among different psychotherapies
