= Paul L. Wachtel =

- Education: Columbia University (A.B.), Yale University (Ph.D.)
- Occupations: Distinguished Professor of Psychology, City College of New York
- Known for: Psychoanalysis; Psychotherapy Integration; Cyclical Psychodynamics

Paul L. Wachtel is Distinguished Professor of Psychology in the Ph.D. program in clinical psychology at the City College of New York. He earned his undergraduate degree at Columbia University and his doctorate in clinical psychology at Yale University.

He is widely recognized for his contributions to psychotherapy integration, psychoanalysis, and personality theory. His 1977 book, Psychoanalysis and Behavior Therapy: Toward an Integration, challenged traditional divisions among psychotherapy schools and helped initiate a movement toward integrative approaches.

Wachtel was a co-founder and past president of the Society for the Exploration of Psychotherapy Integration (SEPI). He has lectured internationally and received numerous awards including the 2010 Hans H. Strupp Award for Psychoanalytic Writing, Teaching, and Research; the 2012 Distinguished Psychologist Award from APA Division 29 (Psychotherapy); the 2013 Scholarship and Research Award from APA Division 39 (Psychoanalysis); and the inaugural Sidney J. Blatt Award for Outstanding Contributions to Psychotherapy in 2018.

== Research and theoretical contributions ==
Wachtel is best known for his theory of cyclical psychodynamics, emphasizing the powerful role of vicious circles in the lives of people and societies. This approach aims to illuminate how the way we see and experience the world leads us to act in ways that are likely to evoke responses from others that perpetuate that very way of seeing and experiencing the world.

His work also explores the psychological effects of materialism and affluence on individual well-being and social cohesion, as well as race relations in America.

== Selected books ==
- Psychoanalysis and Behavior Therapy: Toward an Integration (1977), Basic Books. Internet Archive
- The Poverty of Affluence: A Psychological Portrait of the American Way of Life (1983), Free Press. Internet Archive
- Family Dynamics in Individual Psychotherapy (1986), Guilford Press. Publisher page
- Action and Insight (1987), Guilford Press. WorldCat
- Psychoanalysis, Behavior Therapy, and the Relational World (1997), American Psychological Association. WorldCat
- Theories of Psychotherapy: Origins and Evolution (1997), American Psychological Association. Internet Archive
- Race in the Mind of America: Breaking the Vicious Circle Between Blacks and Whites (1999), Routledge. Publisher page
- Relational Theory and the Practice of Psychotherapy (2008), Guilford Press. Publisher page
- Therapeutic Communication: Knowing What to Say When (2nd ed., 2011), Guilford Press. Publisher page
- Inside the Session: What Really Happens in Psychotherapy? (2011), American Psychological Association. APA Publisher page
- Cyclical Psychodynamics and the Contextual Self: The Inner World, the Intimate World, and the World of Culture and Society (2014), Routledge. Publisher page
- Making Room for the Disavowed: Reclaiming the Self in Psychotherapy (2023), Guilford Press. Publisher page
