= Lester Luborsky =

Lester B. Luborsky (1920–2009) was one of the founders of scientific research in psychotherapy.

Luborsky was born and raised in Philadelphia. He graduated from Philadelphia Central High School and then earned his bachelor's degree at Pennsylvania State University.

Luborsky received his Ph.D. in psychology from Duke University. He was an instructor at the University of Illinois for two years. He then spent eleven years at the Menninger Foundation before joining the faculty of the University of Pennsylvania.

In 1973–1974 Luborsky served as president of the Society for Psychotherapy Research.

== Career ==
Author of nine books and over 400 articles, he was a pioneer in the application of the scientific method to the personal processes of psychotherapy. He studied factors that make psychotherapy work by conducting large-scale studies of therapy outcome. Among his major research contributions were the development of new methods to study therapeutic processes, notably the symptom–context method, which gave a way to understand and study symptoms as they occur, and the CCRT (core conflictual relationship theme) method, which allowed the objective study of the psychoanalytic concept of the transference. His other contributions to measurement measures included The Helping Alliance Scale, which give a way to measure the therapeutic relationship, and the Health–Sickness Rating Scale, which was later adapted to become the Global Assessment of Functioning (Axis V) in the Diagnostic and Statistical Manual (DSM), as noted in the DSM-IV.

Luborsky received numerous awards, among them the gold medal for Lifetime Achievement in the Applications of Psychology by the American Psychological Association, The Sigourney Award for Distinguished Contributions to the Field of Psychoanalysis, and The Award for Distinguished Psychoanalytic Theory and Research by the American Psychoanalytic Association.

== Publications ==
- Luborsky (1984) Principles of Psychoanalytic Psychotherapy: A Manual for Supportive-Expressive (SE) Treatment
- Luborsky & Crits-Christoph (1990, reissued in 1998) Understanding Transference, The Core Conflictual Theme Method
- Luborsky (1996) The Symptom-Context Method: Symptoms as Opportunities in Psychotherapy
- Luborsky, L & Luborsky, E (2006) Research & Psychotherapy: The Vital Link

== See also ==
- Dodo bird verdict § History
