= Psychotherapy =

Clinically applied psychology for desired behavior change

- Specialty: Psychology, psychiatry
- MeSH: D011613

Psychotherapy (also psychological therapy, talk therapy, or talking therapy) is the use of psychological methods, particularly when based on regular personal interaction, to help a person change behavior, increase happiness, and overcome problems. Psychotherapy aims to improve an individual's well-being and mental health, to resolve or mitigate troublesome behaviors, beliefs, compulsions, thoughts, or emotions, and to improve relationships and social skills. Numerous types of psychotherapy have been designed either for individual adults, families, or children and adolescents. Some types of psychotherapy are considered evidence-based for treating diagnosed mental disorders; other types have been criticized as pseudoscience. However, at least to some extent, psychotherapies are supported by neuroscience, tend to have longer-lasting effects than pharmacotherapies, and can improve the effects of pharmacotherapies, including those involving psychedelics.

There are hundreds of psychotherapy techniques, some being minor variations; others are based on very different conceptions of psychology. Most approaches involve one-to-one sessions, between the client and therapist, but some are conducted with groups, including couples and families.

Psychotherapists may be mental health professionals such as psychiatrists, psychologists, mental health nurses, clinical social workers, marriage and family therapists, or licensed professional counselors. Psychotherapists may also come from a variety of other backgrounds, and depending on the jurisdiction may be legally regulated, voluntarily regulated or unregulated (and the term itself may be protected or not).

It has shown general efficacy across a range of conditions, although its efficacy varies by individual and condition. While large-scale reviews support its benefits, debates continue over the best methods for evaluating outcomes, including the use of randomized controlled trials versus individualized approaches. A 2022 umbrella review of 102 meta-analyses found that effect sizes for both psychotherapies and medications were generally small, leading researchers to recommend a paradigm shift in mental health research. Although many forms of therapy differ in technique, they often produce similar outcomes, leading to theories that common factors—such as the therapeutic relationship—are key drivers of efficacy. Challenges include high dropout rates, limited understanding of mechanisms of change, potential adverse effects, and concerns about therapist adherence to treatment fidelity. Critics have raised questions about psychotherapy's scientific basis, cultural assumptions, and power dynamics, while others argue it is underutilized compared to pharmacological treatments.

== Definitions ==
The term psychotherapy is derived from Ancient Greek psyche (ψυχή meaning "breath; spirit; soul") and therapeia (θεραπεία "healing; medical treatment"). The Oxford English Dictionary defines it as "The treatment of disorders of the mind or personality by psychological means...", however, in earlier use, it denoted the treatment of disease through hypnotic suggestion. Psychotherapy is often dubbed as a "talking therapy" or "talk therapy", particularly for a general audience, though not all forms of psychotherapy rely on verbal communication. Children or adults who do not engage in verbal communication (or not in the usual way) are not excluded from psychotherapy; indeed some types are designed for such cases. Play therapy, developed for children and also used with people with intellectual disability, places less emphasis on verbal ability and lets the client work non-verbally.

The American Psychological Association adopted a resolution on the effectiveness of psychotherapy in 2012 based on a definition developed by American psychologist John C. Norcross: "Psychotherapy is the informed and intentional application of clinical methods and interpersonal stances derived from established psychological principles for the purpose of assisting people to modify their behaviors, cognitions, emotions, and/or other personal characteristics in directions that the participants deem desirable". Influential editions of a work by psychiatrist Jerome Frank defined psychotherapy as a healing relationship using socially authorized methods in a series of contacts primarily involving words, acts and rituals—which Frank regarded as forms of persuasion and rhetoric. Historically, psychotherapy has sometimes meant "interpretative" (i.e. Freudian) methods, namely psychoanalysis, in contrast with other methods to treat psychiatric disorders such as behavior modification.

Some definitions of counseling overlap with psychotherapy (particularly in non-directive client-centered approaches), or counseling may refer to guidance for everyday problems in specific areas, typically for shorter durations with a less medical or "professional" focus. Somatotherapy refers to the use of physical changes as injuries and illnesses, and sociotherapy to the use of a person's social environment to effect therapeutic change. Psychotherapy may address spirituality as a significant part of someone's mental / psychological life, and some forms are derived from spiritual philosophies, but practices based on treating the spiritual as a separate dimension are not necessarily considered as traditional or 'legitimate' forms of psychotherapy.

== Delivery ==
Psychotherapy may be delivered in person (one on one, or with couples, with families, or, in groups) or via telephone counseling or online counseling (see also § Telepsychotherapy). There have also been developments in computer-assisted therapy, such as virtual reality therapy for behavioral exposure, multimedia programs to teach cognitive techniques, and handheld devices for improved monitoring or putting ideas into practice (see also § Computer-supported).

Most forms of psychotherapy use spoken conversation. Some also use various other forms of communication such as the written word, artwork, drama, narrative story or music. Psychotherapy with children and their parents often involves play, dramatization (i.e. role-play), and drawing, with a co-constructed narrative from these non-verbal and displaced modes of interacting.

Some therapeutic settings use digital tools to help with session documentation. Ambient systems, for example, employ speech recognition that captures clinician–patient dialogue and generates draft notes for later review. These tools, offered by various vendors including Twofold Health, must comply with privacy and security requirements such as those set out in HIPAA.

=== Adherence ===
Patient adherence to a course of psychotherapy—continuing to attend sessions or complete tasks—is a major issue.

The dropout level—early termination—ranges from around 30% to 60%, depending partly on how it is defined. The range is lower for research settings for various reasons, such as the selection of clients and how they are inducted. Early termination is associated on average with various demographic and clinical characteristics of clients, therapists and treatment interactions. The high level of dropout has raised some criticism about the relevance and efficacy of psychotherapy.

Most psychologists use between-session tasks in their general therapy work, and cognitive behavioral therapies in particular use and see them as an "active ingredient". It is not clear how often clients do not complete them, but it is thought to be a pervasive phenomenon.

From the other side, the adherence of therapists to therapy protocols and techniques—known as "treatment integrity" or "fidelity"—has also been studied, with complex mixed results. In general, however, it is a hallmark of evidence-based psychotherapy to use fidelity monitoring as part of therapy outcome trials and ongoing quality assurance in clinical implementation.

== Regulation ==
Psychotherapists traditionally may be mental health professionals like psychologists and psychiatrists; professionals from other backgrounds (family therapists, clinical social workers, nurses, etc.) who have trained in a specific psychotherapy; or (in some cases) academic or scientifically trained professionals. In addition to the training, many countries require psychotherapist to register with a professional body in order to be permitted to offer services.

Psychiatrists are trained first as physicians, and as such they may prescribe prescription medication; and specialist psychiatric training begins after medical school in psychiatric residencies: however, their specialty is in mental disorders or forms of mental illness. Clinical psychologists have specialist doctoral degrees in psychology with some clinical and research components. Other clinical practitioners, clinical social workers, mental health counselors, pastoral counselors, and nurses with a specialization in mental health, also often conduct psychotherapy. Many of the wide variety of psychotherapy training programs and institutional settings are multi-professional. In most countries, psychotherapy training is completed at a postgraduate level, often at a master's degree (or doctoral) level, over four years, with significant clinical supervision and clinical placements. Mental health professionals that choose to specialize in psychotherapeutic work also require a program of continuing professional education after basic professional training.

A listing of the extensive professional competencies of a European psychotherapist was developed by the European Association of Psychotherapy (EAP) in 2013.

As sensitive and deeply personal topics are often discussed during psychotherapy, therapists are expected, and usually legally bound, to respect client or patient confidentiality. The critical importance of client confidentiality—and the limited circumstances in which it may need to be broken for the protection of clients or others—is enshrined in the regulatory psychotherapeutic organizations' codes of ethical practice. Examples of when it is typically accepted to break confidentiality include when the therapist has knowledge that a child or elder is being physically abused; when there is a direct, clear and imminent threat of serious physical harm to self or to a specific individual. In some countries psychotherapists are required by law to be mandated reporters.

=== Europe ===
As of 2015, there are still a lot of variations between different European countries about the regulation and delivery of psychotherapy. Several countries have no regulation of the practice or no protection of the title. Some have a system of voluntary registration, with independent professional organizations, while other countries attempt to restrict the practice of psychotherapy to 'mental health professionals' (psychologists and psychiatrists) with state-certified training. The titles that are protected also vary. The European Association for Psychotherapy (EAP) established the 1990 Strasbourg Declaration on Psychotherapy, which is dedicated to establishing an independent profession of psychotherapy in Europe, with pan-European standards. The EAP has already made significant contacts with the European Union & European Commission towards this end.

Given that the European Union has a primary policy about the free movement of labor within Europe, European legislation can overrule national regulations that are, in essence, forms of restrictive practices.

In Germany, the practice of psychotherapy for adults is restricted to qualified psychologists and physicians (including psychiatrists) who have completed several years of specialist practical training and certification in psychotherapy. As psychoanalysis, psychodynamic therapy, cognitive behavioral therapy, and systemic therapy meet the requirements of German health insurance companies, mental health professionals regularly opt for one of these four specializations in their postgraduate training. For psychologists, this includes three years of full-time practical training (4,200 hours), encompassing a year-long internship at an accredited psychiatric institution, six months of clinical work at an outpatient facility, 600 hours of supervised psychotherapy in an outpatient setting, and at least 600 hours of theoretical seminars. Social workers may complete the specialist training for child and teenage clients. Similarly in Italy, the practice of psychotherapy is restricted to graduates in psychology or medicine who have completed four years of recognised specialist training. Sweden has a similar restriction on the title "psychotherapist", which may only be used by professionals who have gone through a post-graduate training in psychotherapy and then applied for a licence, issued by the National Board of Health and Welfare.

Legislation in France restricts the use of the title "psychotherapist" to professionals on the National Register of Psychotherapists, which requires a training in clinical psychopathology and a period of internship which is only open to physicians or titulars of a master's degree in psychology or psychoanalysis.

Austria and Switzerland (2011) have laws that recognize multi-disciplinary functional approaches.

In the United Kingdom, the government and Health and Care Professions Council considered mandatory legal registration but decided that it was best left to professional bodies to regulate themselves, so the Professional Standards Authority for Health and Social Care (PSA) launched an Accredited Voluntary Registers scheme. Counseling and psychotherapy are not protected titles in the United Kingdom. Counsellors and psychotherapists who have trained and qualify to a certain standard (usually a level 4 Diploma) can apply to be members of the professional bodies who are listed on the PSA Accredited Registers.

=== United States ===
In some states, counselors or therapists must be licensed to use certain words and titles on self-identification or advertising. In some other states, the restrictions on practice are more closely associated with the charging of fees. Licensing and regulation are performed by various states. Presentation of practice as licensed, but without such a license, is generally illegal. Without a license, for example, a practitioner cannot bill insurance companies. Information about state licensure of psychologists is provided by the American Psychological Association.

In addition to state laws, the American Psychological Association requires its members to adhere to its published Ethical Principles of Psychologists and Code of Conduct. The American Board of Professional Psychology examines and certifies "psychologists who demonstrate competence in approved specialty areas in professional psychology".

=== Canada ===
Regulation of psychotherapy is in the jurisdiction of, and varies among, the provinces and territories.

In Quebec, psychotherapy is a regulated activity which is restricted to psychologists, medical doctors, and holders of a psychotherapy permit issued by the Ordre des psychologues du Québec, the Quebec order of psychologists. Members of certain specified professions, including social workers, couple and family therapists, occupational therapists, guidance counsellors, criminologists, sexologists, psychoeducators, and registered nurses may obtain a psychotherapy permit by completing certain educational and practice requirements; their professional oversight is provided by their own professional orders. Some other professionals who were practising psychotherapy before the current system came into force continue to hold psychotherapy permits alone.

On 1 July 2019, Ontario's Missing Persons Act came into effect, with the purpose of giving police more power to investigate missing persons. It allows police to require (as opposed to permit) health professionals, including psychotherapists, to share otherwise confidential documents about their client, if there is reason to believe their client is missing. Some have expressed concern that this legislation undermines psychotherapy confidentiality and could be abused maliciously by police, while others have praised the act for how it respects privacy and includes checks and balances.

=== Australia ===
In Australia the peak regulatory bodies are the Australian Counselling Association (ACA) and Psychotherapy and Counselling Federation of Australia (PACFA).

On the 13th of October 2025, the National Standards for Counsellors and Psychotherapists entered the counsultation stage. The standards define career stages that have specified requirements in the level of education, training and experience expected of counsellors or psychotherapists at each level. These stages are mapped to the Australian Qualifications Framework.

== History ==
Psychotherapy can be said to have been practiced through the ages, as medics, philosophers, spiritual practitioners and people in general used psychological methods to heal others.

In the Western tradition, by the 19th century, a moral treatment movement (then meaning morale or mental) developed based on non-invasive non-restraint therapeutic methods. Another influential movement was started by Franz Mesmer (1734–1815) and his student Armand-Marie-Jacques de Chastenet, Marquis of Puységur (1751–1825). Called Mesmerism or animal magnetism, it would have a strong influence on the rise of dynamic psychology and psychiatry as well as theories about hypnosis. In 1853, Walter Cooper Dendy introduced the term "psycho-therapeia" regarding how physicians might influence the mental states of patients and thus their bodily ailments, for example by creating opposing emotions to promote mental balance. Daniel Hack Tuke cited the term and wrote about "psycho-therapeutics" in 1872 in his book Illustrations of the Influence of the Mind upon the Body in Health and Disease, in which he also proposed making a science of animal magnetism.

Hippolyte Bernheim and his colleagues in the "Nancy School" (Ambroise-Auguste Liébeault, Henri-Étienne Beaunis, and Jules Liégeois) developed the concept of "psychotherapy" in the sense of using the mind to heal the body through hypnotism, yet further. Charles Lloyd Tuckey's 1889 work, Psycho-therapeutics, or Treatment by Hypnotism and Suggestion popularized the work of the Nancy School in English. Also in 1889 a clinic used the word in its title for the first time, when Frederik van Eeden and Albert Willem van Renterghem in Amsterdam renamed theirs "Clinique de Psycho-thérapeutique Suggestive" after visiting Nancy. During this time, travelling stage hypnosis became popular, and such activities added to the scientific controversies around the use of hypnosis in medicine. Also in 1892, at the second congress of experimental psychology, van Eeden attempted to take the credit for the term psychotherapy and to distance the term from hypnosis. In 1896, the German journal Zeitschrift für Hypnotismus, Suggestionstherapie, Suggestionslehre und verwandte psychologische Forschungen changed its name to Zeitschrift für Hypnotismus, Psychotherapie sowie andere psychophysiologische und psychopathologische Forschungen, which is probably the first journal to use the term. Thus psychotherapy initially meant "the treatment of disease by psychic or hypnotic influence, or by suggestion".

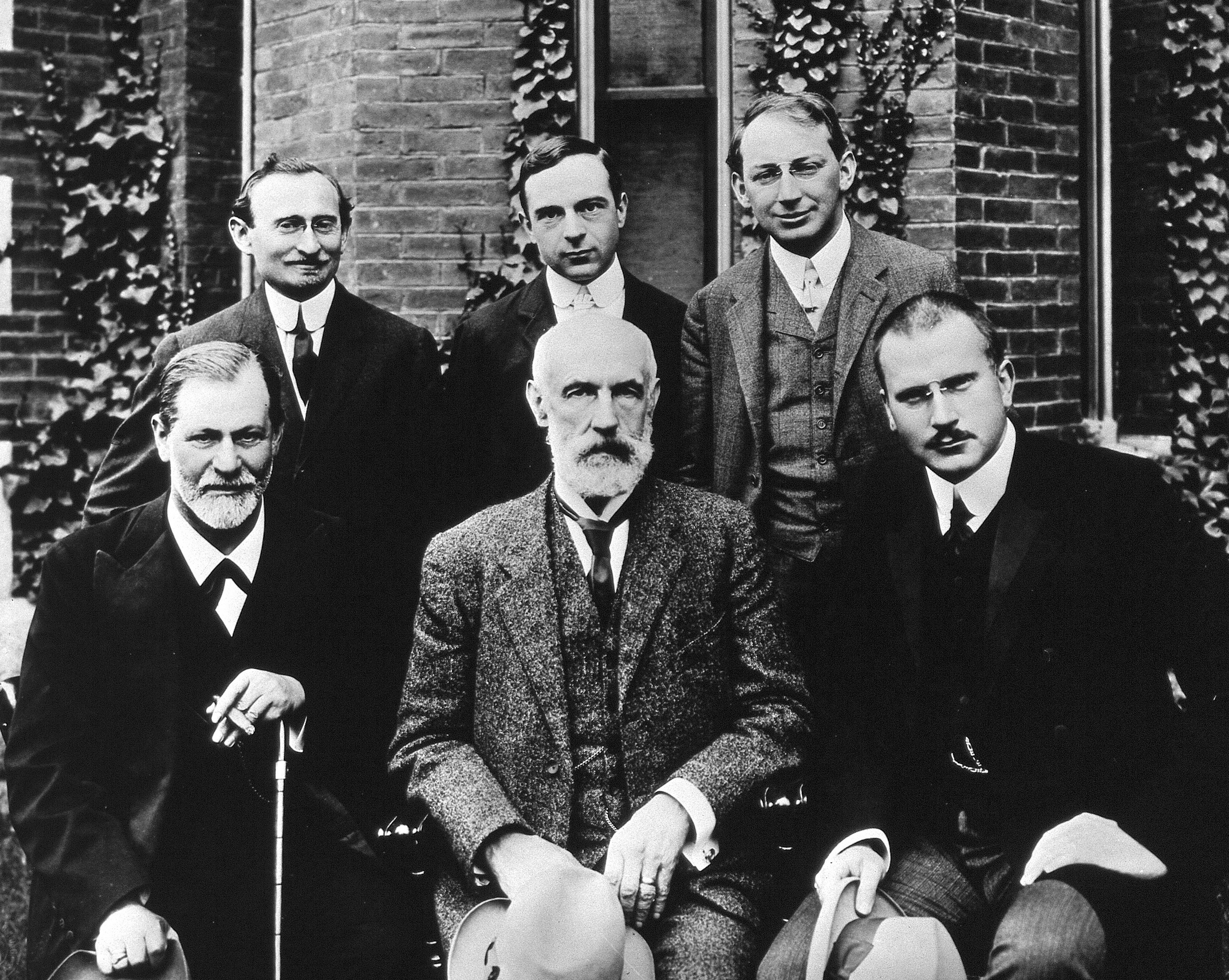
Freud, seated left of picture with Jung seated at the right of the picture. 1909

Sigmund Freud visited the Nancy School and his early neurological practice involved the use of hypnotism. However following the work of his mentor Josef Breuer—in particular a case where symptoms appeared partially resolved by what the patient, Bertha Pappenheim, dubbed a "talking cure"—Freud began focusing on conditions that appeared to have psychological causes originating in childhood experiences and the unconscious mind. He went on to develop techniques such as free association, dream interpretation, transference and analysis of the id, ego and superego. His popular reputation as the father of psychotherapy was established by his use of the distinct term "psychoanalysis", tied to an overarching system of theories and methods, and by the effective work of his followers in rewriting history. Many theorists, including Alfred Adler, Carl Jung, Karen Horney, Anna Freud, Otto Rank, Erik Erikson, Melanie Klein and Heinz Kohut, built upon Freud's fundamental ideas and often developed their own systems of psychotherapy. These were all later categorized as psychodynamic, meaning anything that involved the psyche's conscious/unconscious influence on external relationships and the self. Sessions tended to number into the hundreds over several years.

Behaviorism developed in the 1920s, and behavior modification as a therapy became popularized in the 1950s and 1960s. Notable contributors were Joseph Wolpe in South Africa, M.B. Shapiro and Hans Eysenck in Britain, and John B. Watson and B.F. Skinner in the United States. Behavioral therapy approaches relied on principles of operant conditioning, classical conditioning and social learning theory to bring about therapeutic change in observable symptoms. The approach became commonly used for phobias, as well as other disorders.

Some therapeutic approaches developed out of the European school of existential philosophy. Concerned mainly with the individual's ability to develop and preserve a sense of meaning and purpose throughout life, major contributors to the field (e.g., Irvin Yalom, Rollo May) and Europe (Viktor Frankl, Ludwig Binswanger, Medard Boss, R.D.Laing, Emmy van Deurzen) attempted to create therapies sensitive to common "life crises" springing from the essential bleakness of human self-awareness, previously accessible only through the complex writings of existential philosophers (e.g., Søren Kierkegaard, Jean-Paul Sartre, Gabriel Marcel, Martin Heidegger, Friedrich Nietzsche). The uniqueness of the patient-therapist relationship thus also forms a vehicle for therapeutic inquiry. A related body of thought in psychotherapy started in the 1950s with Carl Rogers. Based also on the works of Abraham Maslow and his hierarchy of human needs, Rogers brought person-centered psychotherapy into mainstream focus. The primary requirement was that the client receive three core "conditions" from his counselor or therapist: unconditional positive regard, sometimes described as "prizing" the client's humanity; congruence [authenticity/genuineness/transparency]; and empathic understanding. This type of interaction was thought to enable clients to fully experience and express themselves, and thus develop according to their innate potential. Others developed the approach, like Fritz and Laura Perls in the creation of Gestalt therapy, as well as Marshall Rosenberg, founder of Nonviolent Communication, and Eric Berne, founder of transactional analysis. Later these fields of psychotherapy would become what is known as humanistic psychotherapy today. Self-help groups and books became widespread.

During the 1950s, Albert Ellis originated rational emotive behavior therapy (REBT). Independently a few years later, psychiatrist Aaron T. Beck developed a form of psychotherapy known as cognitive therapy. Both of these included relatively short, structured and present-focused techniques aimed at identifying and changing a person's beliefs, appraisals and reaction-patterns, by contrast with the more long-lasting insight-based approach of psychodynamic or humanistic therapies. Beck's approach used primarily the socratic method, and links have been drawn between ancient stoic philosophy and these cognitive therapies.

Cognitive and behavioral therapy approaches were increasingly combined and grouped under the umbrella term cognitive behavioral therapy (CBT) in the 1970s. Many approaches within CBT are oriented towards active/directive yet collaborative empiricism (a form of reality-testing), and assessing and modifying core beliefs and dysfunctional schemas. These approaches gained widespread acceptance as a primary treatment for numerous disorders. A "third wave" of cognitive and behavioral therapies developed, including acceptance and commitment therapy and dialectical behavior therapy, which expanded the concepts to other disorders and/or added novel components and mindfulness exercises. However the "third wave" concept has been criticized as not essentially different from other therapies and having roots in earlier ones as well. Counseling methods developed include solution-focused therapy and systemic coaching.

Postmodern psychotherapies such as narrative therapy and coherence therapy do not impose definitions of mental health and illness, but rather see the goal of therapy as something constructed by the client and therapist in a social context. Systemic therapy also developed, which focuses on family and group dynamics—and transpersonal psychology, which focuses on the spiritual facet of human experience. Other orientations developed in the last three decades include feminist therapy, brief therapy, somatic psychology, expressive therapy, applied positive psychology and the human givens approach. A survey of over 2,500 US therapists in 2006 revealed the most utilized models of therapy and the ten most influential therapists of the previous quarter-century.

== Types ==
There are hundreds of psychotherapy approaches and schools of thought. By 1980, there were more than 250; by 1996, more than 450; and by the start of the 21st century, there were over a thousand different named psychotherapies. While some are minor variations, others are based on very different conceptions of psychology, ethics, or technique. In practice, therapy is rarely limited to one pure type. Instead, it often draws from a number of perspectives—a method known as an integrative or eclectic approach. Contemporary integrative models increasingly emphasize identifying and modifying recurrent cognitive, emotional, and interpersonal patterns by combining techniques from cognitive-behavioral, psychodynamic, and attachment-based frameworks.

The importance of the therapeutic relationship, also known as the therapeutic alliance, between the client and therapist is often regarded as crucial to psychotherapy. Common factors theory addresses this alliance alongside other core aspects thought to be responsible for effective treatment.

Sigmund Freud (1856–1939), a Viennese neurologist who studied under Jean-Martin Charcot in 1885, is often considered the father of modern psychotherapy. His methods included analyzing his patients' dreams in search of hidden insights into their unconscious minds. Other major elements of his methods, which changed throughout the years, included the identification of childhood sexuality, the role of anxiety as a manifestation of inner conflict, the differentiation of the psyche (into id, ego, and superego), and the concepts of transference and countertransference. The terms transference and countertransference describe, respectively, the patient's projections onto the therapist and the therapist's emotional responses to the patient. Because some of his concepts were too broad to be amenable to empirical testing and invalidation, Freud was critiqued by Karl Jaspers. Despite these critiques, numerous major figures, including Melanie Klein and Donald Winnicott, later elaborated on and refined Freud's therapeutic techniques.

Since the 1960s, however, the use of Freudian-based analysis for the treatment of mental disorders has declined substantially. Different types of psychotherapy have emerged alongside clinical trials designed to test them scientifically. These include subjective treatments (after Beck), behavioral treatments (after Skinner and Wolpe), and more time-constrained, centered structures, such as interpersonal psychotherapy. For youth disorders and schizophrenia, family therapy approaches are valuable. Some of the concepts developed in therapy have become widespread and form part of the toolset for everyday clinical practice. They are not just treatments; they also help clinicians understand complex behavior.

Therapy may address specific forms of diagnosable mental illness, everyday problems in managing or maintaining interpersonal relationships, or challenges meeting personal goals. A course of therapy may occur before, during, or after pharmacotherapy (e.g., taking psychiatric medication).

Psychotherapies are categorized in several different ways. A distinction can be made between those based on a medical model and those based on a humanistic model. In the medical model, the client is seen as unwell, and the therapist employs their skills to help the client return to health. The extensive use of the DSM-IV, the Diagnostic and Statistical Manual of Mental Disorders in the United States, is an example of a purely medical model. The humanistic or non-medical model, by contrast, strives to depathologize the human condition. The therapist attempts to create a relational environment conducive to experiential learning, helping build the client's confidence in their own natural processes to achieve a deeper understanding of themselves. In this framework, the therapist may see themselves as a facilitator or helper.

Another distinction is made between individual, one-on-one therapy sessions and group psychotherapy, the latter of which includes couples therapy and family therapy.

Therapies are sometimes classified according to their duration. A small number of sessions over a few weeks or months may be classified as brief therapy or short-term therapy. Approaches where regular sessions take place for years may be classified as long-term.

Some practitioners distinguish between uncovering or depth approaches and more supportive psychotherapy. Uncovering psychotherapy emphasizes facilitating the client's insight into the roots of their difficulties, with the best-known example being classical psychoanalysis. Supportive psychotherapy, by contrast, focuses on strengthening the client's coping mechanisms, frequently providing encouragement and advice, and offering reality-testing and limit-setting where necessary. Depending on the client's issues and situation, either a supportive or an uncovering approach may be optimal.

=== Humanistic ===
These psychotherapies, also known as "experiential", are based on humanistic psychology and emerged in reaction to both behaviorism and psychoanalysis, being dubbed the "third force". They are primarily concerned with the human development and needs of the individual, with an emphasis on subjective meaning, a rejection of determinism, and a concern for positive growth rather than pathology. Some posit an inherent human capacity to maximize potential, "the self-actualizing tendency"; the task of therapy is to create a relational environment where this tendency might flourish. Humanistic psychology can, in turn, be rooted in existentialism—the belief that human beings can only find meaning by creating it. This is the goal of existential therapy. Existential therapy is in turn philosophically associated with phenomenology.

Person-centered therapy, also known as client-centered, focuses on the therapist showing openness, empathy and "unconditional positive regard", to help clients express and develop their own self.

Humanistic Psychodrama (HPD) is based on the human image of humanistic psychology. So all rules and methods follow the axioms of humanistic psychology. The HPD sees itself as development-oriented psychotherapy and has completely moved away from the psychoanalytic catharsis theory. Self-awareness and self-realization are essential aspects in the therapeutic process. Subjective experiences, feelings and thoughts and one's own experiences are the starting point for a change or reorientation in experience and behavior in the direction of more self-acceptance and satisfaction. Dealing with the biography of the individual is closely related to the sociometry of the group.

Gestalt therapy, originally called "concentration therapy", is an existential/experiential form that facilitates awareness in the various contexts of life, by moving from talking about relatively remote situations to action and direct current experience. Derived from various influences, including an overhaul of psychoanalysis, it stands on top of essentially four load-bearing theoretical walls: phenomenological method, dialogical relationship, field-theoretical strategies, and experimental freedom.

A briefer form of humanistic therapy is the human givens approach, introduced in 1998–99. It is a solution-focused intervention based on identifying emotional needs—such as for security, autonomy and social connection—and using various educational and psychological methods to help people meet those needs more fully or appropriately.

=== Insight-oriented ===
Insight-oriented psychotherapies focus on revealing or interpreting unconscious processes. Most commonly referring to psychodynamic therapy, of which psychoanalysis is the oldest and most intensive form, these applications of depth psychology encourage the verbalization of all the patient's thoughts, including free associations, fantasies, and dreams, from which the analyst formulates the nature of the past and present unconscious conflicts which are causing the patient's symptoms and character problems.

There are six main schools of psychoanalysis, which all influenced psychodynamic theory: Freudian, ego psychology, object relations theory, self psychology, interpersonal psychoanalysis, and relational psychoanalysis. Techniques for analytic group therapy have also developed.

=== Cognitive-behavioral ===
Behavior therapies use behavioral techniques, including applied behavior analysis (also known as behavior modification), to change maladaptive patterns of behavior to improve emotional responses, cognitions, and interactions with others. Functional analytic psychotherapy is one form of this approach. By nature, behavioral therapies are empirical (data-driven), contextual (focused on the environment and context), functional (interested in the effect or consequence a behavior ultimately has), probabilistic (viewing behavior as statistically predictable), monistic (rejecting mind-body dualism and treating the person as a unit), and relational (analyzing bidirectional interactions).

Cognitive therapy focuses directly on changing the thoughts, in order to improve the emotions and behaviors.

Cognitive behavioral therapy attempts to combine the above two approaches, focused on the construction and reconstruction of people's cognitions, emotions and behaviors. Generally in CBT, the therapist, through a wide array of modalities, helps clients assess, recognize and deal with problematic and dysfunctional ways of thinking, emoting and behaving.

The concept of "third wave" psychotherapies reflects an influence of Eastern philosophy in clinical psychology, incorporating principles such as meditation into interventions such as mindfulness-based cognitive therapy, acceptance and commitment therapy, and dialectical behavior therapy for borderline personality disorder.

Interpersonal psychotherapy (IPT) is a relatively brief form of psychotherapy (deriving from both CBT and psychodynamic approaches) that has been increasingly studied and endorsed by guidelines for some conditions. It focuses on the links between mood and social circumstances, helping to build social skills and social support. It aims to foster adaptation to current interpersonal roles and situations.

Exposure and response prevention (ERP) is primarily deployed by therapists in the treatment of OCD. The American Psychiatric Association (APA) state that CBT drawing primarily on behavioral techniques (such as ERP) has the "strongest evidence base" among psychosocial interventions. By confronting feared scenarios (i.e., exposure) and refraining from performing rituals (i.e., responsive prevention), patients may gradually feel less distress in confronting feared stimuli, while also feeling less inclination to use rituals to relieve that distress. Typically, ERP is delivered in "hierarchical fashion", meaning patients confront increasingly anxiety-provoking stimuli as they progress through a course of treatment.

A growing body of research suggests that mindfulness practices centred on present-moment awareness are effective in psychiatric treatment and have become increasingly popular in recent years. Contemporary theories of mindfulness-based interventions suggest that reductions in rumination, alongside increases in decentering, emotion regulation, self-compassion, and psychological flexibility, contribute to the beneficial effects of mindfulness training on mental health outcomes. Empirical research further indicates that reductions in rumination mediate improvements in symptoms of depression, anxiety, and psychological distress, highlighting rumination as a key mechanism through which mindfulness-based interventions exert their therapeutic effects.

Other types include reality therapy/choice theory, multimodal therapy, and therapies for specific disorders including PTSD therapies such as cognitive processing therapy, substance abuse therapies such as relapse prevention and contingency management; and co-occurring disorders therapies such as Seeking Safety.

=== Systemic ===
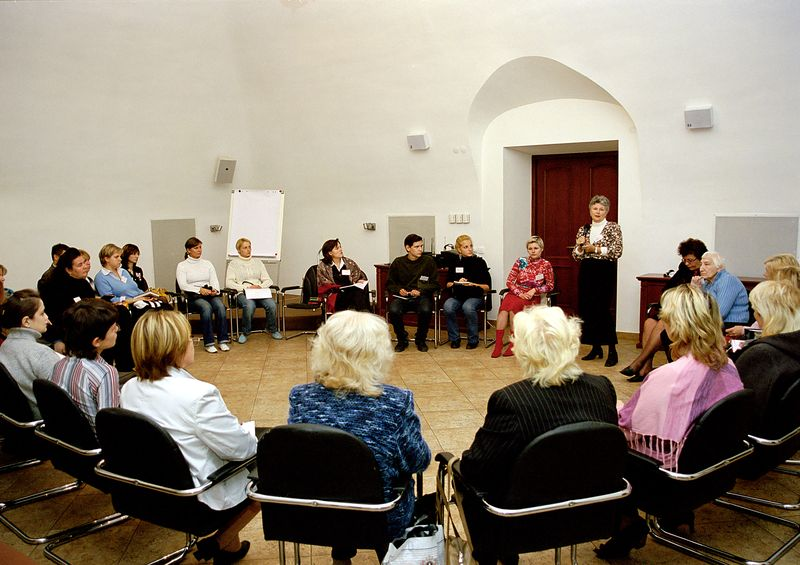
Group therapy, Ukraine

Systemic therapy seeks to address people not just individually, as is often the focus of other forms of therapy, but in relationship, dealing with the interactions of groups, their patterns and dynamics (includes family therapy and marriage counseling). Community psychology is a type of systemic psychology.

The term group therapy was first used around 1920 by Jacob L. Moreno, whose main contribution was the development of psychodrama, in which groups were used as both cast and audience for the exploration of individual problems by reenactment under the direction of the leader. The more analytic and exploratory use of groups in both hospital and out-patient settings was pioneered by a few European psychoanalysts who emigrated to the US, such as Paul Schilder, who treated severely neurotic and mildly psychotic out-patients in small groups at Bellevue Hospital, New York. The power of groups was most influentially demonstrated in Britain during the Second World War, when several psychoanalysts and psychiatrists proved the value of group methods for officer selection in the War Office Selection Boards. A chance to run an Army psychiatric unit on group lines was then given to several of these pioneers, notably Wilfred Bion and Rickman, followed by S. H. Foulkes, Main, and Bridger. The Northfield Hospital in Birmingham gave its name to what came to be called the two "Northfield Experiments", which provided the impetus for the development since the war of both social therapy, that is, the therapeutic community movement, and the use of small groups for the treatment of neurotic and personality disorders. Today group therapy is used in clinical settings and in private practice settings.

=== Expressive ===
Expressive psychotherapy is a form of therapy that utilizes artistic expression (via improvisational, compositional, re-creative, and receptive experiences) as its core means of treating clients. Expressive psychotherapists use the different disciplines of the creative arts as therapeutic interventions. This includes the modalities dance therapy, drama therapy, art therapy, music therapy, writing therapy, among others. This may include techniques such as affect labeling. Expressive psychotherapists believe that often the most effective way of treating a client is through the expression of imagination in creative work and integrating and processing what issues are raised in the act.

=== Postmodernist ===
Also known as post-structuralist or constructivist. Narrative therapy gives attention to each person's "dominant story" through therapeutic conversations, which also may involve exploring unhelpful ideas and how they came to prominence. Possible social and cultural influences may be explored if the client deems it helpful. Coherence therapy posits multiple levels of mental constructs that create symptoms as a way to strive for self-protection or self-realization. Feminist therapy does not accept that there is one single or correct way of looking at reality and therefore is considered a postmodernist approach.

=== Child ===
Psychotherapy needs to be adapted to meet the developmental needs of children. Depending on age, it is generally held to be one part of an effective strategy to help the needs of a child within the family setting. Child psychotherapy training programs necessarily include courses in human development. Since children often do not have the ability to articulate thoughts and feelings, psychotherapists will use a variety of media such as musical instruments, sand and toys, crayons, paint, clay, puppets, bibliocounseling (books), or board games. The use of play therapy is often rooted in psychodynamic theory, but other approaches also exist.

In addition to therapy for the child, sometimes instead of it, children may benefit if their parents work with a therapist, take parenting classes, attend grief counseling, or take other action to resolve stressful situations that affect the child. Parent management training is a highly effective form of psychotherapy that teaches parenting skills to reduce their child's behavior problems.

In many cases a different psychotherapist will work with the care taker of the child, while a colleague works with the child. Therefore, contemporary thinking on working with the younger age group has leaned towards working with parent and child simultaneously, as well as individually as needed.

=== Computer-supported ===
Research on computer-supported and computer-based interventions has increased significantly over the course of the last two decades. The following applications frequently have been investigated:

- Virtual reality: VR is a computer-generated scenario that simulates experience. The immersive environment, used for simulated exposure, can be similar to the real world or it can be fantastical, creating a new experience.
- Computer-based interventions (or online interventions or internet interventions): These interventions can be described as interactive self-help. They usually entail a combination of text, audio or video elements.
- Computer-supported therapy (or blended therapy): Classical psychotherapy is supported by means of online or software application elements. The feasibility of such interventions has been investigated for individual and group therapy.

=== Telepsychotherapy ===
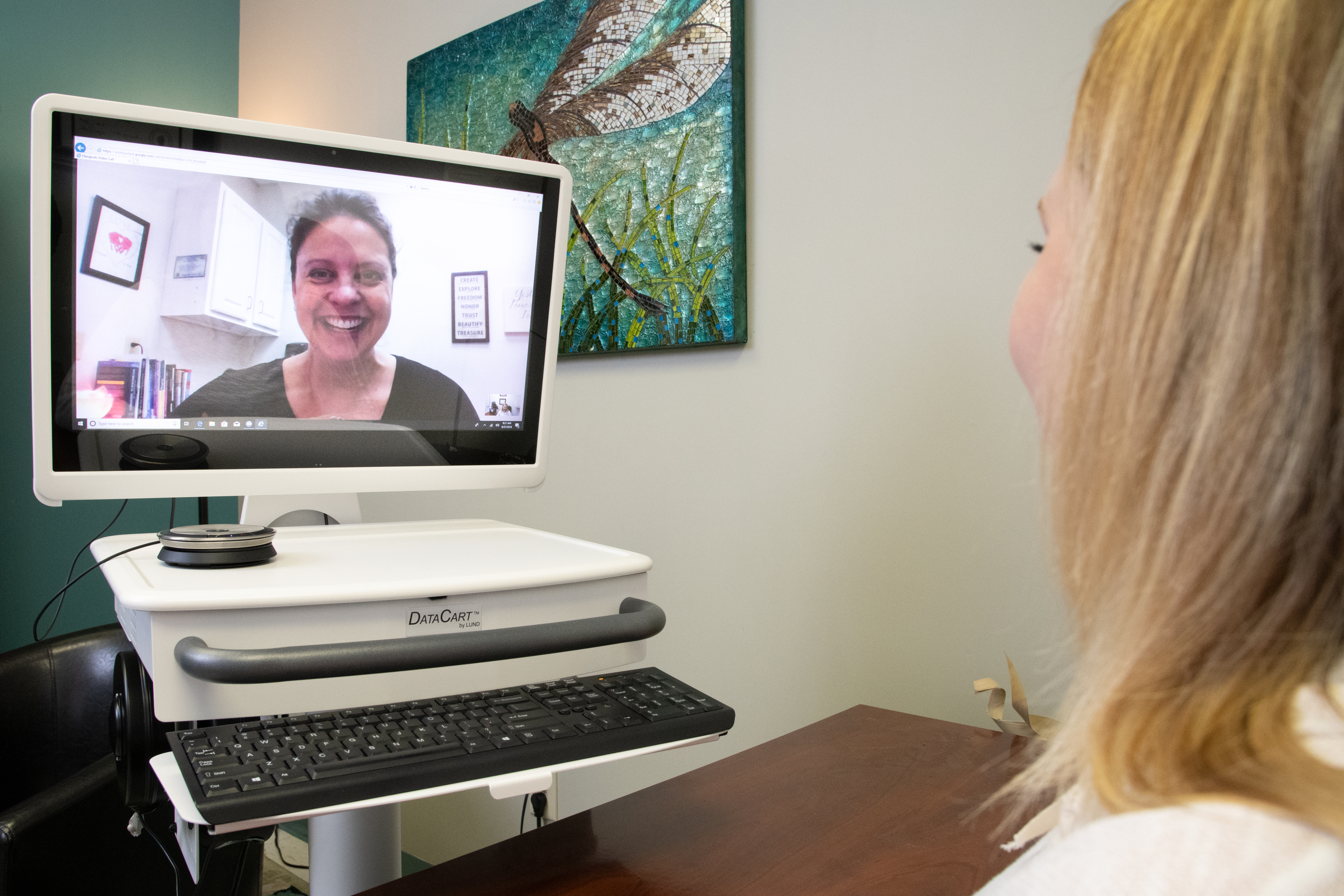
Telemental health session

Telepsychiatry or telemental health refers to the use of telecommunications technology (mostly videoconferencing and phone calls) to deliver psychiatric care remotely for people with mental health conditions. It is a branch of telemedicine.

Telepsychiatry can be effective in treating people with mental health conditions. In the short-term it can be as acceptable and effective as face-to-face care. Research also suggests comparable therapeutic factors, such as changes in problematic thinking or behaviour.

It can improve access to mental health services for some but might also represent a barrier for those lacking access to a suitable device, the internet or the necessary digital skills. Factors such as poverty that are associated with lack of internet access are also associated with greater risk of mental health problems, making digital exclusion an important problem of telemental health services.

During the COVID-19 pandemic mental health services were adapted to telemental health in high-income countries. It proved effective and acceptable for use in an emergency situation but there were concerns regarding its long-term implementation.

=== Other ===
Transpersonal psychology addresses the client in the context of a spiritual understanding of consciousness. Positive psychotherapy (PPT) (since 1968) is a method in the field of humanistic and psychodynamic psychotherapy and is based on a positive image of humans, with a health-promoting, resource-oriented and conflict-centered approach.

Hypnotherapy is undertaken while a subject is in a state of hypnosis. Hypnotherapy is often applied in order to modify a subject's behavior, emotional content, and attitudes, as well as a wide range of conditions including: dysfunctional habits, anxiety, stress-related illness, pain management, and personal development.

Psychedelic therapy are therapeutic practices involving psychedelic drugs, such as LSD, psilocybin, DMT, and MDMA. In psychedelic therapy, in contrast to conventional psychiatric medication taken by the patient regularly or as needed, patients generally remain in an extended psychotherapy session during the acute psychedelic activity with additional sessions both before and after in order to help integrate experiences with the psychedelics. Psychedelic therapy has been compared with the shamanic healing rituals of indigenous people. Researchers identified two main differences: the first is the shamanic belief that multiple realities exist and can be explored through altered states of consciousness, and second the belief that spirits encountered in dreams and visions are real. The charitable initiative Founders Pledge has written a research report on cost-effective giving opportunities for funding psychedelic-assisted mental health treatments.

Body psychotherapy, part of the field of somatic psychology, focuses on the link between the mind and the body and tries to access deeper levels of the psyche through greater awareness of the physical body and emotions. There are various body-oriented approaches, such as Reichian (Wilhelm Reich) character-analytic vegetotherapy and orgonomy; neo-Reichian bioenergetic analysis; somatic experiencing; integrative body psychotherapy; Ron Kurtz's Hakomi psychotherapy; sensorimotor psychotherapy; Biosynthesis psychotherapy; and Biodynamic psychotherapy. These approaches are not to be confused with body work or body-therapies that seek to improve primarily physical health through direct work (touch and manipulation) on the body, rather than through directly psychological methods.

Some non-Western indigenous therapies have been developed. In African countries this includes harmony restoration therapy, meseron therapy and systemic therapies based on the Ubuntu philosophy.

Integrative psychotherapy is an attempt to combine ideas and strategies from more than one theoretical approach. These approaches include mixing core beliefs and combining proven techniques. Forms of integrative psychotherapy include multimodal therapy, the transtheoretical model, cyclical psychodynamics, systematic treatment selection, cognitive analytic therapy, internal family systems model, multitheoretical psychotherapy and conceptual interaction. In practice, most experienced psychotherapists develop their own integrative approach over time.

Emerging psychotherapeutic models increasingly integrate evolutionary biology and evolutionary psychology into clinical practice. Evolutionarily informed psychotherapy frameworks such as Compassion-Focused Therapy (CFT) and Evolutionary Systems Therapy (EST) utilize evolutionary principles to conceptualize psychological distress not merely as pathology, but as non-optimal adaptations or functional outcomes of evolved strategies operating within specific social contexts.

== Effects ==
=== Efficacy ===
There is considerable controversy about whether, or when, psychotherapy efficacy is best evaluated by randomized controlled trials or more individualized idiographic methods.

One issue with trials is what to use as a placebo treatment group or non-treatment control group. Often, this group includes patients on a waiting list, or those receiving some kind of regular non-specific contact or support. Researchers must consider how best to match the use of inert tablets or sham treatments in placebo-controlled studies in pharmaceutical trials. Several interpretations and differing assumptions and language remain. Another issue is the attempt to standardize and manualize therapies and link them to specific symptoms of diagnostic categories, making them more amenable to research. Some report that this may reduce efficacy or gloss over individual needs. Fonagy and Roth's opinion is that the benefits of the evidence-based approach outweighs the difficulties.

There are several formal frameworks for evaluating whether a psychotherapist is a good fit for a patient. One example is the Scarsdale Psychotherapy Self-Evaluation (SPSE). However, some scales, such as the SPS, elicit information specific to certain schools of psychotherapy alone (e.g. the superego).

Many psychotherapists believe that the nuances of psychotherapy cannot be captured by questionnaire-style observation, and prefer to rely on their own clinical experiences and conceptual arguments to support the type of treatment they practice. Psychodynamic therapists increasingly believe that evidence-based approaches are appropriate to their methods and assumptions, and have increasingly accepted the challenge to implement evidence-based approaches in their methods.

A pioneer in investigating the results of different psychological therapies was psychologist Hans Eysenck, who argued that psychotherapy does not produce any improvement in patients. He held that behavior therapy is the only effective one. However, it was revealed that Eysenck (who died in 1997) falsified data in his studies about this subject, fabricating data that would indicate that behavioral therapy enables achievements that are impossible to believe. Fourteen of his papers were retracted by journals in 2020, and journals issued 64 statements of concern about publications by him. Rod Buchanan, a biographer of Eysenck, has argued that 87 publications by Eysenck should be retracted.

The response rate of psychotherapy varies, no reliable changes due to psychotherapy can be found in up to 33% of patients.

Patient internal locus of control and accountability can improve the effect of psychotherapy.

==== Comparison with other treatments ====
Large-scale international reviews of scientific studies have concluded that psychotherapy is effective for numerous conditions. A 2022 umbrella review of 102 meta-analyses found that most effect sizes reported for both psychotherapies and pharmacotherapies, compared to treatment-as-usual or placebo, were small for most disorders and treatments, and concluded that a "paradigm shift in research" was needed to advance the field and improve treatment strategies for mental disorders.

One line of research consistently found that supposedly different forms of psychotherapy show similar effectiveness. According to the 2008 edition of The Handbook of Counseling Psychology: "Meta-analyses of psychotherapy studies have consistently demonstrated that there are no substantial differences in outcomes among treatments". The handbook stated that "little evidence suggests that any one treatment consistently outperforms any other for any specific psychological disorders". This is sometimes called the Dodo bird verdict after a scene/section in Alice in Wonderland where every competitor in a race was called a winner and is given prizes.

Further analyses seek to identify the factors that the psychotherapies have in common that seem to account for this, known as common factors theory; for example the quality of the therapeutic relationship, interpretation of problem, and the confrontation of painful emotions.

Outcome studies have been critiqued for being too removed from real-world practice in that they use carefully selected therapists who have been extensively trained and monitored, and patients who may be non-representative of typical patients by virtue of strict inclusionary/exclusionary criteria. Such concerns impact the replication of research results and the ability to generalize from them to practicing therapists.

However, specific therapies have been tested for use with specific disorders, and regulatory organizations in both the UK and US make recommendations for different conditions.

The Helsinki Psychotherapy Study was one of several large long-term clinical trials of psychotherapies that have taken place. Anxious and depressed patients in two short-term therapies (solution-focused and brief psychodynamic) improved faster, but five years long-term psychotherapy and psychoanalysis gave greater benefits. Several patient and therapist factors appear to predict suitability for different psychotherapies.

Meta-analyses have established that cognitive behavioral therapy (CBT) and psychodynamic psychotherapy are equally effective in treating depression.

A 2014 meta analysis over 11,000 patients reveals that Interpersonal Psychotherapy (IPT) is of comparable effectiveness to CBT for depression but is inferior to the latter for eating disorders. For children and adolescents, interpersonal psychotherapy and CBT are the best methods according to a 2014 meta analysis of almost 4000 patients.

=== Adverse effects ===
Research on adverse effects of psychotherapy has been limited, yet worsening of symptoms may be expected to occur in 3% to 15% of patients, with variability across patient and therapist characteristics. Potential problems include deterioration of symptoms or developing new symptoms, strains in other relationships, social stigma, and therapy dependence. Some techniques or therapists may carry more risks than others, and some client characteristics may make them more vulnerable. Side-effects from properly conducted therapy should be distinguished from harms caused by malpractice.

=== Mechanisms of change ===
It is not yet understood how psychotherapies can succeed in treating mental illnesses. Different therapeutic approaches may be associated with particular theories about what needs to change in a person for a successful therapeutic outcome.

In general, processes of emotional arousal and memory have long been held to play an important role. One theory combining these aspects proposes that permanent change occurs to the extent that the neuropsychological mechanism of memory reconsolidation is triggered and is able to incorporate new emotional experiences.

=== General critiques ===
Some critics are skeptical of the healing power of psychotherapeutic relationships. Some dismiss psychotherapy altogether in the sense of a scientific discipline requiring professional practitioners, instead favoring either nonprofessional help or biomedical treatments. Others have pointed out ways in which the values and techniques of therapists can be harmful as well as helpful to clients (or indirectly to other people in a client's life).

Many resources available to a person experiencing emotional distress—the friendly support of friends, peers, family members, clergy contacts, personal reading, healthy exercise, research, and independent coping—all present considerable value. Critics note that humans have been dealing with crises, navigating severe social problems and finding solutions to life problems long before the advent of psychotherapy.

On the other hand, some argue psychotherapy is under-utilized and under-researched by contemporary psychiatry despite offering more promise than stagnant medication development. In 2015, the US National Institute of Mental Health allocated only 5.4% of its budget to new clinical trials of psychotherapies (medication trials are largely funded by pharmaceutical companies), despite plentiful evidence they can work and that patients are more likely to prefer them.

Further critiques have emerged from feminist, constructionist and discourse-analytical sources. Key to these is the issue of power. In this regard there is a concern that clients are persuaded—both inside and outside the consulting room—to understand themselves and their difficulties in ways that are consistent with therapeutic ideas. This means that alternative ideas (e.g., feminist, economic, spiritual) are sometimes implicitly undermined. Critics suggest that we idealize the situation when we think of therapy only as a helping relationship—arguing instead that it is fundamentally a political practice, in that some cultural ideas and practices are supported while others are undermined or disqualified, and that while it is seldom intended, the therapist–client relationship always participates in society's power relations and political dynamics. A noted academic who espoused this criticism was Michel Foucault.

== Training ==
The training of psychotherapists varies across global jurisdictions, though it generally necessitates a combination of academic education and clinical practice. Most regulatory frameworks require practitioners to hold a graduate degree, such as a master's or doctorate, in a field like psychology, counseling, clinical social work, or psychiatry. Beyond education, trainees must typically complete a substantial number of supervised clinical hours to develop practical competency and ethical judgment. Educational programs may adhere to established pedagogical frameworks, such as the "scientist-practitioner" model, which integrates original research with clinical application, the "practitioner-scholar" model, which prioritizes direct clinical training and the practical application of existing research. Some new training programs emphasize deliberate practice, an approach involving the iterative rehearsal of specific clinical skills and expert feedback to enhance therapeutic effectiveness. Many specialized psychotherapy modalities, such as cognitive behavioral therapy, acceptance and commitment therapy, or psychodynamic psychotherapy, require additional post-graduate certification through dedicated professional institutes. Accreditation bodies, governmental agencies, and professional associations oversee these programs to ensure that practitioners meet specific standards of care and professional conduct. In many regions, lifelong learning is mandated through continuing education requirements to ensure therapists remain updated on evolving research and therapeutic techniques.

== See also ==
- Improving Access to Psychological Therapies
- List of psychotherapy journals
- Physical therapy – Profession that helps a disabled person function in everyday life
- Psychosomatic medicine – Interdisciplinary medical field exploring various influences on bodily processes
