= Core conflictual relationship theme =

Psychoanalytic technique

The core conflictual relationship theme, or CCRT, is an analytic tool developed in the late twentieth century by Lester Luborsky, as an aid both to brief psychotherapy in the psychodynamic tradition, and to researching its efficacy.

== Origins ==
Drawing on the Freudian concept of transference, as refined by Jacob Arlow to cover a specific pattern of relating to people established in early life, as well as upon Michael Balint's focal therapy, with its concern to delimit therapy to the exploration of a key theme, CCRT set out to focus therapy on three aspects of a client's central relationship conflict – their core desire, the response to it they typically elicited from other people (RO), and their reaction in turn to that response (RS).

== Methods ==
CCRT is generally employed within the context of a time-limited therapy (perhaps involving 16 or 24 sessions). It focuses on examining core patterns of relating, initially using relationship anecdotes to establish them; and typically involves an exploration of early familial transactions, as manifested through psychological projection and projective identification in outside life, as well as in the transference. Fantasies also are closely linked with the core theme.

Research reveals that accurately interpreting the core patterns of relationship conflict is associated with positive outcomes both within sessions and over the treatment as a whole.

== See also ==
- Malan triangles
- Repetition compulsion
