= American Psychologist =

- Discipline: Psychology
- Language: English
- Edited by: Harris Cooper

Publication details
- History: 1946–present
- Publisher: American Psychological Association (United States)
- Frequency: 9/year
- Impact factor: 7.2 (2024)

Standard abbreviations
- ISO 4: Am. Psychol.

Indexing
- CODEN: AMPSAB
- ISSN: 0003-066X (print); 1935-990X (web)
- LCCN: 49005284
- OCLC no.: 1435230

Links
- Journal homepage; Online archive

American Psychologist is a peer-reviewed academic journal published by the American Psychological Association. Established in 1946, the journal publishes articles of broad interest to psychologists, including empirical reports and scholarly reviews covering science, practice, education, and policy, and occasionally publishes special issues on relevant topics in the field of psychology. The editor-in-chief is Harris Cooper (Duke University).

According to the Journal Citation Reports, the journal has a 2024 impact factor of 7.2.

== Abstracting and indexing ==
The journal is abstracted and indexed in:

- ATLA Religion Database
- CINAHL
- Current Contents/Social and Behavioral Sciences
- EBSCO databases
- Embase
- Index Medicus/MEDLINE/PubMed
- International Bibliography of Periodical Literature
- International Bibliography of the Social Sciences
- Modern Language Association Database
- PASCAL
- ProQuest databases
- PsycINFO
- Social Sciences Citation Index
- Scopus

== See also ==
- Developmental Psychology
- Journal of Abnormal Psychology
- Journal of Experimental Psychology
- Journal of Personality and Social Psychology
