= Jerome Frank (psychiatrist) =

American psychiatrist (1909–2005)

Jerome David Frank (May 30, 1909 in New York City – March 14, 2005) was an American psychiatrist who held the post of Professor of Psychiatry at the Johns Hopkins University Medical School. His book Persuasion and Healing: A Comparative Study of Psychotherapy was influential in his field. Frank's personal papers are archived in the Personal Papers Collections of the Alan Mason Chesney Medical Archives, Johns Hopkins University. He earned degrees from Harvard College and Harvard Medical School.

He conducted the Soda Cracker Experiment, which inspired Stanley Milgram's famous experiment on obedience.

He was also an outspoken critic of nuclear weapons.
