= Larry E. Beutler =

American psychologist

- Born: February 14, 1941
- Known for: Systematic treatment selection
- Scientific career
- Fields: Psychology

Larry E. Beutler is an American clinical psychologist.

== Biography ==
Beutler received his Ph.D. from the University of Nebraska and subsequently served on the faculties of Duke University Medical Center, Stephen F. Austin State University, Baylor College of Medicine, the University of Arizona Health Sciences Center, and the University of California at Santa Barbara. He is currently a Distinguished Professor of Psychology, Chair of the Faculty, and Director of Clinical Training at Pacific Graduate School of Psychology. Beutler is also Professor Emeritus at the University of California. He is a diplomate of the American Board of Professional Psychology (ABPP), a fellow of both American Psychological Association (APA) and Association for Psychological Science (APS), a Past President of Division 29 (Psychotherapy) of APA, current President of Division 12 (Clinical) of APA, and a two-term Past-President (international) of the Society for Psychotherapy Research (SPR). Among his citations and achievements, he is a recipient of the Distinguished Career award from SPR, the Gold Medal Award from the American Psychological Foundation, and a Presidential citation for success from the APA. He has also been honored for his contributions by the States of Arizona and California. He has published over 350 scholarly articles and chapters and is the author or co-author of 15 books on psychotherapy, assessment, and psychopathology.

Later in his career, he became involved in the psychology of terrorism and response to terrorist acts. He is currently the director of the National Center on the Psychology of Terrorism in Palo Alto, California.

== Systematic treatment selection ==
Systematic treatment selection (STS) is an empirically derived approach to the practice of psychotherapy. It revolves around the use of an expert system to guide the clinician's thinking about how best to approach a particular case. The STS model has been demonstrated to improve treatment outcomes significantly compared to treatment as usual.

== Major books ==
- Guidelines for the Systematic Treatment of the Depressed Patient (Guidebooks in Clinical Psychology)
- Rethinking the DSM: A Psychological Perspective (Decade of Behavior)
- Psychology of Terrorism
