= Les Greenberg =

Canadian psychologist (born 1945)

Leslie Samuel Greenberg (born 30 September 1945) is a Canadian psychologist born in Johannesburg, South Africa, and is one of the originators and primary developers of emotion-focused therapy for individuals and couples.

He is a professor emeritus of psychology at York University in Toronto, and also director of the Emotion-Focused Therapy Clinic in Toronto. His research has addressed questions regarding empathy, psychotherapy process, the therapeutic alliance, and emotion in human functioning.

Greenberg studied engineering and worked as an engineer before earning his Ph.D. in psychology from York University in 1975. With his mentor Laura North Rice, who had studied with Carl Rogers at the University of Chicago, he began doing psychotherapy process research, attempting to mathematically model therapist–client interactions and using techniques of task analysis. He was also influenced early in his career by Juan Pascual-Leone's neo-Piagetian constructivist model of mind. His first academic position was at the University of British Columbia in counseling psychology, and he completed an externship at the Mental Research Institute in California in 1981. Initially trained in a client-centered therapy approach, he then trained in Gestalt therapy and over the years was exposed to many other approaches including systemic-interactional, psychodynamic and cognitive therapy. He returned to York University in 1986 as professor of psychology.

Greenberg has published numerous articles and co-authored the major books on emotion-focused approaches to psychotherapy. He is a founding member of the Society for the Exploration of Psychotherapy Integration (SEPI) and a past president of the Society for Psychotherapy Research (SPR), from which he received the Distinguished Research Career Award in 2004. The Canadian Psychological Association awarded him the Professional Award for Distinguished Contributions to Psychology as a Profession, and the American Psychological Association awarded him the APA Award for Distinguished Professional Contributions to Applied Research and the Carl Rogers Award. He has been on the editorial board of many psychotherapy journals, including the Journal of Clinical Psychology, Journal of Consulting and Clinical Psychology, Journal of Family Psychology, Journal of Marital & Family Therapy, Journal of Psychotherapy Integration and Psychotherapy Research.

== Selected publications ==
- Goldman, Rhonda N.; Greenberg, Leslie S. (2015). Case formulation in emotion-focused therapy: co-creating clinical maps for change. Washington, DC: American Psychological Association. ISBN 9781433818202. OCLC 878667783.
- Lane, Richard D.; Ryan, Lee; Nadel, Lynn; Greenberg, Leslie S. (2015). "Memory reconsolidation, emotional arousal and the process of change in psychotherapy: new insights from brain science" (PDF). Behavioral and Brain Sciences. 38: e1. doi:10.1017/S0140525X14000041. PMID 24827452.
- Thoma, Nathan C.; Greenberg, Leslie S. (2015). "Integrating emotion-focused therapy into cognitive behavioral therapy". In Thoma, Nathan C.; McKay, Dean (eds.). Working with emotion in cognitive-behavioral therapy: techniques for clinical practice. New York: Guilford Press. pp. 239–262. ISBN 9781462517749. OCLC 881362948.
- Greenberg, Leslie S.; McWilliams, Nancy; Wenzel, Amy (2014). Exploring three approaches to psychotherapy. Washington, DC: American Psychological Association. ISBN 9781433815218. OCLC 830992600.
- McNally, Siobhan; Timulak, Ladislav; Greenberg, Leslie S. (April 2014). "Transforming emotion schemes in emotion focused therapy: a case study investigation". Person-Centered & Experiential Psychotherapies. 13 (2): 128–149. doi:10.1080/14779757.2013.871573. S2CID 144416617.
- Goldman, Rhonda N.; Greenberg, Leslie S. (March 2013). "Working with identity and self-soothing in emotion-focused therapy for couples". Family Process. 52 (1): 62–82. doi:10.1111/famp.12021. PMID 25408090. S2CID 9826633.
- Cunha, Carla; Gonçalves, Miguel M.; Hill, Clara E.; Mendes, Inês; Ribeiro, António P.; Sousa, Inês; Angus, Lynne E.; Greenberg, Leslie S. (December 2012). "Therapist interventions and client innovative moments in emotion-focused therapy for depression". Psychotherapy: Theory, Research, Practice, Training. 49 (4): 536–548. doi:10.1037/a0028259. hdl:1822/22714. PMID 22731789.
- Geller, Shari M.; Greenberg, Leslie S. (2012). Therapeutic presence: a mindful approach to effective therapy. Washington, DC: American Psychological Association. ISBN 9781433810602. OCLC 725827689.
- Greenberg, Leslie S. (November 2012). "Emotions, the great captains of our lives: their role in the process of change in psychotherapy". American Psychologist. 67 (8): 697–707. doi:10.1037/a0029858. PMID 23163464.
- Angus, Lynne E.; Greenberg, Leslie S. (2011). Working with narrative in emotion-focused therapy: changing stories, healing lives. Washington, DC: American Psychological Association. ISBN 9781433809699. OCLC 698451460.
- Elliott, Robert; Bohart, Arthur C.; Watson, Jeanne C.; Greenberg, Leslie S. (March 2011). "Empathy". Psychotherapy: Theory, Research, Practice, Training. 48 (1): 43–49. doi:10.1037/a0022187. PMID 21401273.
- Greenberg, Leslie S. (2011). Emotion-focused therapy. Theories of psychotherapy series. Washington, DC: American Psychological Association. ISBN 9781433808579. OCLC 655301581.
- Mendes, Inês; Ribeiro, António P.; Angus, Lynne E.; Greenberg, Leslie S.; Sousa, Inês; Gonçalves, Miguel M. (May 2011). "Narrative change in emotion-focused psychotherapy: a study on the evolution of reflection and protest innovative moments". Psychotherapy Research. 21 (3): 304–315. doi:10.1080/10503307.2011.565489. hdl:1822/12711. PMID 21480051. S2CID 8310760.
- Carryer, Jonathan R.; Greenberg, Leslie S. (April 2010). "Optimal levels of emotional arousal in experiential therapy of depression". Journal of Consulting and Clinical Psychology. 78 (2): 190–199. doi:10.1037/a0018401. PMID 20350030. S2CID 25155062.
- Gonçalves, Miguel M.; Mendes, Inês; Ribeiro, António P.; Angus, Lynne E.; Greenberg, Leslie S. (August 2010). "Innovative moments and change in emotion-focused therapy: the case of Lisa". Journal of Constructivist Psychology. 23 (4): 267–294. doi:10.1080/10720537.2010.489758. hdl:10400.24/435. S2CID 56448109.
- Greenberg, Leslie S. (Winter 2010). "Emotion-focused therapy: a clinical synthesis". Focus. 8 (1): 32–42. doi:10.1176/foc.8.1.foc32.
- Mendes, Inês; Ribeiro, António P.; Angus, Lynne E.; Greenberg, Leslie S.; Sousa, Inês; Gonçalves, Miguel M. (November 2010). "Narrative change in emotion-focused therapy: how is change constructed through the lens of the innovative moments coding system?". Psychotherapy Research. 20 (6): 692–701. doi:10.1080/10503307.2010.514960. hdl:1822/56645. PMID 21154027. S2CID 6956522.
- Pascual-Leone, Antonio; Greenberg, Leslie S.; Pascual-Leone, Juan (July 2009). "Developments in task analysis: new methods to study change". Psychotherapy Research. 19 (4): 527–542. doi:10.1080/10503300902897797. PMID 20183405. S2CID 8357543.
- Greenberg, Leslie S.; Warwar, Serine H.; Malcolm, Wanda M. (April 2008). "Differential effects of emotion-focused therapy and psychoeducation in facilitating forgiveness and letting go of emotional injuries". Journal of Counseling Psychology. 55 (2): 185–196. doi:10.1037/0022-0167.55.2.185.
- Greenberg, Leslie S.; Goldman, Rhonda N. (2008). Emotion-focused couples therapy: the dynamics of emotion, love, and power. Washington, DC: American Psychological Association. ISBN 9781433803161. OCLC 163614069.
- Greenberg, Leslie S. (February 2008). "Emotion and cognition in psychotherapy: the transforming power of affect". Canadian Psychology. 49 (1): 49–59. doi:10.1037/0708-5591.49.1.49.
- Pascual-Leone, Antonio; Greenberg, Leslie S. (December 2007). "Emotional processing in experiential therapy: why 'the only way out is through'". Journal of Consulting and Clinical Psychology. 75 (6): 875–887. CiteSeerX 10.1.1.452.2569. doi:10.1037/0022-006X.75.6.875. PMID 18085905.
- Watson, Jeanne C.; Goldman, Rhonda N.; Greenberg, Leslie S. (2007). Case studies in emotion-focused treatment of depression: a comparison of good and poor outcome. Washington, DC: American Psychological Association. ISBN 9781591479291. OCLC 76967189.
- Brinegar, Meredith Glick; Salvi, Lisa M.; Stiles, William B.; Greenberg, Leslie S. (April 2006). "Building a meaning bridge: therapeutic progress from problem formulation to understanding". Journal of Counseling Psychology. 53 (2): 165–180. doi:10.1037/0022-0167.53.2.165.
- Frankel, Ze'ev; Levitt, Heidi M.; Murray, David M.; Greenberg, Leslie S.; Angus, Lynne E. (October 2006). "Assessing silent processes in psychotherapy: an empirically derived categorization system and sampling strategy". Psychotherapy Research. 16 (5): 627–638. doi:10.1080/10503300600591635. S2CID 143604345.
- Goldman, Rhonda N.; Greenberg, Leslie S.; Angus, Lynne E. (October 2006). "The effects of adding emotion-focused interventions to the client-centered relationship conditions in the treatment of depression". Psychotherapy Research. 16 (5): 537–549. doi:10.1080/10503300600589456. S2CID 143870091.
- Greenberg, Leslie S.; Pascual-Leone, Antonio (May 2006). "Emotion in psychotherapy: a practice-friendly research review". Journal of Clinical Psychology. 62 (5): 611–630. doi:10.1002/jclp.20252. PMID 16523500.
- Greenberg, Leslie S.; Watson, Jeanne C. (2005). Emotion-focused therapy for depression. Washington, DC: American Psychological Association. ISBN 978-1591472803. OCLC 57514665.
- Heatherington, Laurie; Friedlander, Myrna L.; Greenberg, Leslie S. (March 2005). "Change process research in couple and family therapy: methodological challenges and opportunities". Journal of Family Psychology. 19 (1): 18–27. doi:10.1037/0893-3200.19.1.18. PMID 15796649. S2CID 20473249.
- Elliott, Robert; Watson, Jeanne C.; Goldman, Rhonda N.; Greenberg, Leslie S. (2004). Learning emotion-focused therapy: the process-experiential approach to change. Washington, DC: American Psychological Association. ISBN 978-1591470809. OCLC 52554018.
- Whelton, William J.; Greenberg, Leslie S. (2004). "From discord to dialogue: internal voices and the reorganization of the self in process-experiential therapy". In Hermans, H. J. M.; Dimaggio, Giancarlo (eds.). The dialogical self in psychotherapy. Hove, East Sussex; New York: Brunner-Routledge. pp. 108–123. ISBN 978-1583918555. OCLC 54858092.
- Elliott, Robert; Bohart, Arthur C.; Watson, Jeanne C.; Greenberg, Leslie S. (2011) [2002]. "Empathy". In Norcross, John C. (ed.). Psychotherapy relationships that work: evidence-based responsiveness (2nd ed.). New York: Oxford University Press. pp. 132–152. ISBN 9780199737208. OCLC 663370182.
- Greenberg, Leslie S. (2015) [2002]. Emotion-focused therapy: coaching clients to work through their feelings (2nd ed.). Washington, DC: American Psychological Association. ISBN 9781433819957. OCLC 903873710.
- Greenberg, Leslie S. (Fall 2002). "Evolutionary perspectives on emotion: making sense of what we feel". Journal of Cognitive Psychotherapy. 16 (3): 331–347. doi:10.1891/jcop.16.3.331.52517. S2CID 144525230.
- Greenberg, Leslie S. (June 2002). "Integrating an emotion-focused approach to treatment into psychotherapy integration". Journal of Psychotherapy Integration. 12 (2): 154–189. doi:10.1037/1053-0479.12.2.154.
- Greenberg, Leslie S.; Watson, Jeanne C.; Lietaer, Germain, eds. (1998). Handbook of experiential psychotherapy. The Guilford family therapy series. New York: Guilford Press. ISBN 978-1572303744. OCLC 39465414.
- Bohart, Arthur C.; Greenberg, Leslie S., eds. (1997). Empathy reconsidered: new directions in psychotherapy. Washington, DC: American Psychological Association. ISBN 978-1557984104. OCLC 36219373.
- Greenberg, Leslie S.; Paivio, Sandra C. (1997). Working with emotions in psychotherapy. The practicing professional. New York: Guilford Press. ISBN 978-1572302433. OCLC 36705776.
- Greenberg, Leslie S. (1996). "The power of empathic exploration: a process-experiential/gestalt perspective on the case of Jim Brown". In Farber, Barry A.; Brink, Debora; Raskin, Patricia M. (eds.). The psychotherapy of Carl Rogers: cases and commentary. New York: Guilford Press. pp. 251–260. ISBN 978-1572300644. OCLC 35331305.
- Greenberg, Leslie S.; Watson, Jeanne C. (1996). "Emotion and cognition in experiential therapy: a dialectical constructivist perspective". In Rosen, Hugh; Kuehlwein, Kevin T. (eds.). Constructing realities: meaning-making perspectives for psychotherapists. Jossey-Bass social and behavioral science series. San Francisco: Jossey-Bass. pp. 253–274. ISBN 978-0787901950. OCLC 32969007.
- Greenberg, Leslie S.; Pascual-Leone, Juan (1995). "A dialectical-constructivist approach to experiential change". In Neimeyer, Robert A.; Mahoney, Michael J. (eds.). Constructivism in psychotherapy. Washington, DC: American Psychological Association. pp. 169–194. ISBN 978-1557982797.
- Horvath, Adam O.; Greenberg, Leslie S, eds. (1994). The working alliance: theory, research, and practice. New York: Wiley. ISBN 978-0471546405. OCLC 28749507.
- Johnson, Susan M.; Greenberg, Leslie S., eds. (1994). The heart of the matter: perspectives on emotion in marital therapy. New York: Brunner/Mazel. ISBN 978-0876307410. OCLC 30318897.
- Greenberg, Leslie S.; Rice, Laura North; Elliott, Robert (1993). Facilitating emotional change: the moment-by-moment process. New York: Guilford Press. ISBN 978-0898629941. OCLC 27897484.
- Safran, Jeremy D.; Greenberg, Leslie S., eds. (1991). Emotion, psychotherapy, and change. New York: Guilford Press. ISBN 978-0898625561. OCLC 22665279.
- Greenberg, Leslie S.; Safran, Jeremy D. (January 1989). "Emotion in psychotherapy". American Psychologist. 44 (1): 19–29. doi:10.1037/0003-066X.44.1.19. PMID 2930052.
- Daldrup, Roger J.; Beutler, Larry E.; Engle, David E.; Greenberg, Leslie S. (1988). Focused expressive psychotherapy: freeing the overcontrolled patient. New York: Guilford Press. ISBN 978-0898627299. OCLC 18135202.
- Greenberg, Leslie S.; Johnson, Susan M. (1988). Emotionally focused therapy for couples. New York: Guilford Press. ISBN 978-0898627305. OCLC 17413289.
- Safran, Jeremy D.; Greenberg, Leslie S.; Rice, Laura N. (Spring 1988). "Integrating psychotherapy research and practice: modeling the change process". Psychotherapy: Theory, Research, Practice, Training. 25 (1): 1–17. doi:10.1037/h0085305.
- Greenberg, Leslie S.; Safran, Jeremy D. (1987). Emotion in psychotherapy: affect, cognition, and the process of change. Guilford clinical psychology and psychotherapy series. New York: Guilford Press. ISBN 978-0898620108. OCLC 14214819.
- Greenberg, Leslie S. (February 1986). "Change process research" (PDF). Journal of Consulting and Clinical Psychology. 54 (1): 4–9. doi:10.1037/0022-006X.54.1.4. PMID 3958300.
- Greenberg, Leslie S.; Pinsof, William M., eds. (1986). The psychotherapeutic process: a research handbook. New York: Guilford Press. ISBN 978-0898626513. OCLC 13003288.
- Johnson, Susan M.; Greenberg, Leslie S. (April 1985). "Differential effects of experiential and problem-solving interventions in resolving marital conflict". Journal of Consulting and Clinical Psychology. 53 (2): 175–184. doi:10.1037/0022-006X.53.2.175. PMID 3998245. S2CID 14496528.
- Greenberg, Leslie S.; Safran, Jeremy D. (December 1984). "Integrating affect and cognition: a perspective on the process of therapeutic change". Cognitive Therapy and Research. 8 (6): 559–578. doi:10.1007/BF01173254. S2CID 21135305.
- Rice, Laura North; Greenberg, Leslie S., eds. (1984). Patterns of change: intensive analysis of psychotherapy process. New York: Guilford Press. ISBN 978-0898626247. OCLC 8762790.
- Greenberg, Leslie S. (1983). "Toward a task analysis of conflict resolution in Gestalt therapy". Psychotherapy: Theory, Research & Practice. 20 (2): 190–201. doi:10.1037/h0088490.
- Greenberg, Leslie S.; Webster, Michael C. (September 1982). "Resolving decisional conflict by Gestalt two-chair dialogue: relating process to outcome" (PDF). Journal of Counseling Psychology. 29 (5): 468–477. doi:10.1037/0022-0167.29.5.468.
- Greenberg, Leslie S. (1979). "Resolving splits: use of the two chair technique". Psychotherapy: Theory, Research & Practice. 16 (3): 316–324. doi:10.1037/h0085895.
