= Vittorio Lingiardi =

Italian psychiatrist and psychoanalyst

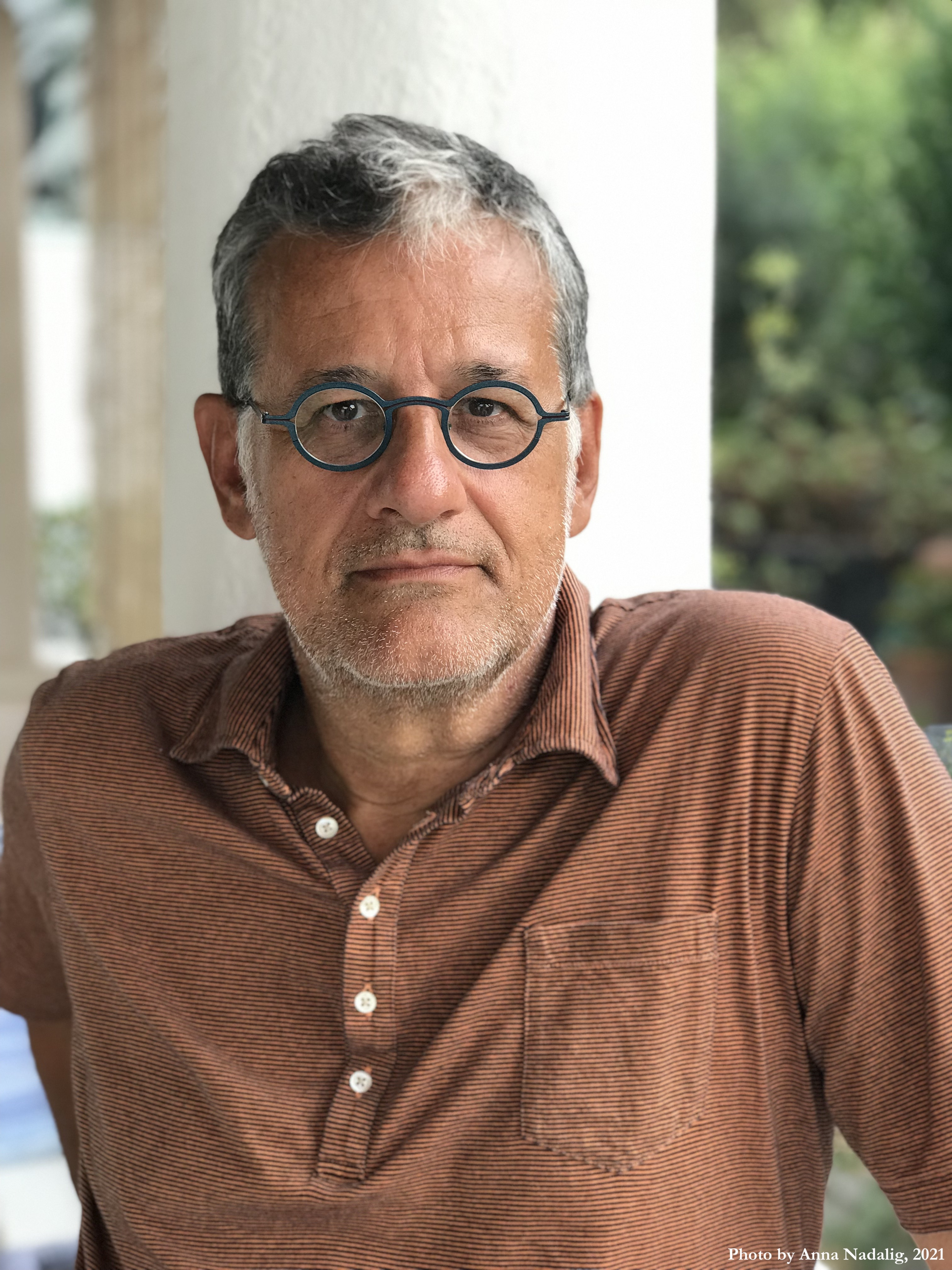
- photo by Anna Nadalig, 2021
- Born: Milan, Italy
- Scientific career
- Fields: Psychiatry, Psychoanalysis, Psychotherapy
- Institutions: Sapienza University of Rome, Department of Dynamic and Clinical Psychology, Faculty of Medicine and Psychology

Vittorio Lingiardi is an Italian psychiatrist and psychoanalyst, Full Professor of Dynamic Psychology and past Director of the Clinical Psychology Specialization Program (2006-2013), Faculty of Medicine and Psychology, Sapienza University of Rome, Italy. He has coordinated with Nancy McWilliams the second edition of the Psychodynamic Diagnostic Manual, the PDM-2 (Guilford Press, 2017).

== Affiliations ==
He is member of the International Association for Analytical Psychology (IAAP), International Association for Relational Psychoanalysis and Psychotherapy (IARPP), Society for Psychotherapy Research (SPR), Italian Chapter (SPR-it), and of the Italian Psychological Association (AIP, Clinical and Dynamic Division). He is also member of the Steering Committee to the Suitability Assessment of the Psychotherapy Training Programs, Ministry of Education, University and Research (MIUR, Italy) and of the Scientific Committee of the LGBT Portal of the Department for Equal Opportunities, Presidency of the Council of Ministers (UNAR, Office against Discrimination, Italy).

== Research topics ==
His scientific and research areas of interest are:

1. Diagnosis, assessment and therapeutic treatment of personality disorders
2. Process outcome research in psychotherapy and psychoanalysis
3. Defense mechanisms
4. Therapeutic alliance
5. Gender identity and sexual orientation

== Publications ==
For the publishing house Raffaello Cortina (Milan) he is Chief Editor of the series "Psychiatry, Neuroscience, Psychotherapy". He is editorial consultant for the publisher il Saggiatore and collaborator of the cultural insert Domenica Il Sole 24 ore and of the magazine Il Venerdì di Repubblica, where he writes a weekly column on cinema and psychoanalysis: "Psycho". He is also the author of two books of poetry: La confusione è precisa in amore [Love is a Precise Confusion] (2012) and Alterazioni del ritmo [Rhythm Disorders] (2015).

=== Books ===
- (in Italian) Mindscapes. Milan: Raffaello Cortina, 2017.
- Psychodynamic Diagnostic Manual – 2nd edition (PDM-2). New York: Guilford Press, 2017 (with N. McWilliams).
- (in Italian) Citizen gay. Affetti e diritti [Citizen gay: Affections and rights]. Milan: il Saggiatore, 2016 (3rd edition).
- (in Italian) La personalità e i suoi disturbi. Valutazione e diagnosi al servizio del trattamento [Personality and its disorders: Assessment and diagnosis for treatment indications]. Milan: Raffaello Cortina, 2014. (with F. Gazzillo)
- (in Italian) La valutazione della personalità con la SWAP-200 [Personality assessment with the SWAP-200]. Milan: Raffaello Cortina 2014. (with J. Shedler & D. Westen)
- (in Italian) La svolta relazionale. Itinerari italiani [The relational turn: Italian journeys]. Milan: Raffaello Cortina, 2011. (with G. Amadei, G. Caviglia, & F. De Bei)
- (in Italian) Linee guida per la consulenza psicologica e la psicoterapia con persone lesbiche, gay e bisessuali. [Guidelines for psychological counselling and psychotherapy with lesbians, gay men and bisexuals]. Milan: Raffaello Cortina, 2014. (with N. Nardelli)
- The Mental Health Professions and Homosexuality: International Perspectives. New York: Haworth, 2003. (with J. Drescher)
- Men in Love: Male Homosexualities from Ganymede to Batman. Chicago & La Salle: Open Court, 2002.
