= John Christopher Muran =

American clinical psychologist (born 1961)

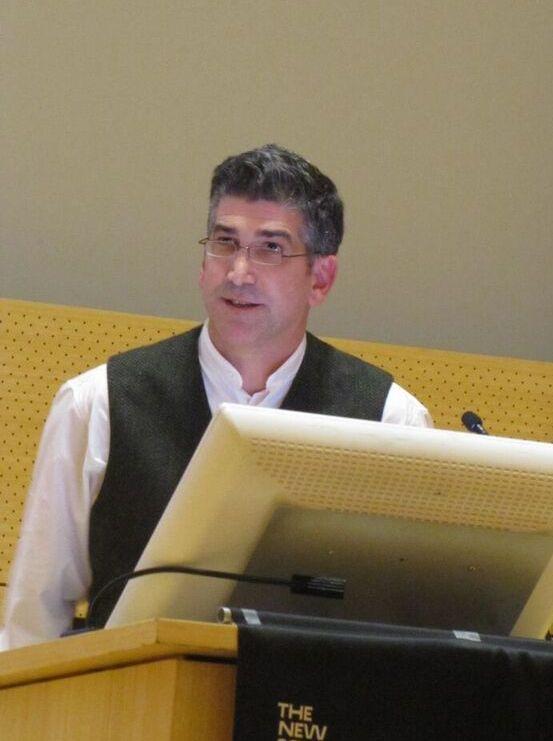
- Muran in 2015
- Education: Hamilton College (B.A.); Hofstra University (Ph.D.); University of Toronto (Fellowship); New York University (Certificate)
- Scientific career
- Workplaces: Gordon F. Derner School of Psychology, Adelphi University; Department of Psychiatry, Mount Sinai Beth Israel, Icahn School of Medicine at Mount Sinai; Postdoctoral Program, New York University

John Christopher Muran (born December 4, 1961, in New York) is an American clinical psychologist and psychotherapy researcher.

== Education ==
John Christopher Muran graduated cum laude from The Hotchkiss School in 1980 and Hamilton College in 1984. He completed a doctorate in combined professional-scientific psychology at Hofstra University in 1989. He also completed postdoctoral training in cognitive therapy at the Clarke Institute of Psychiatry (University of Toronto) in 1990 and in psychoanalysis at the New York University Postdoctoral Program in 1998.

== Career ==
He is Dean of the Gordon F. Derner School of Psychology, Adelphi University (founded as the first-university based professional school), where he holds the appointment of full professor and served as training director for the doctoral program in clinical psychology (2009-2021). He is also Principal Investigator of the Psychotherapy Research Program at Mount Sinai Beth Israel (since 1990), which has been supported by grants from the National Institute of Mental Health, and is on faculty at Icahn School of Medicine at Mount Sinai. In addition, he is on the teaching faculty of the NYU Postdoctoral Program.

Muran's work has concentrated on the following topics: psychotherapy integration and difference, therapeutic relationship and therapeutic alliance, therapist position and experience, treatment impasse and failure, performance under pressure, theories on self, and intersubjectivity. He has published over 200 papers and 10 books, including Alliance-Focused Training (2026; with colleagues), Therapist Performance under Pressure (2020; with Catherine Eubanks), The Therapeutic Alliance (2010; with Jacques Barber), Dialogues on Difference (2007), Self-Relations in the Psychotherapy Process (2001), and Negotiating the Therapeutic Alliance (2000; with Jeremy Safran).

Muran is a fellow of the American Psychological Association (since 2007) and served on its Advisory Steering Committee for Clinical Treatment Guidelines. He is past-president of the international Society for Psychotherapy Research (SPR) and past-editor of its journal Psychotherapy Research. He has also served on several editorial boards, including Journal of Consulting & Clinical Psychology and Clinical Psychology: Science & Practice. He has received other recognitions and honors for his accomplishments, including APA's Distinguished Psychologist Award for Contributions to Psychology and Psychotherapy, National Register's Alfred M. Wellner Lifetime Achievement Award for Research Excellence and SPR's Senior Distinguished Career Award. He also held the Horst Kächele visiting professorship at the International Psychoanalytic University in Berlin during its winter semester 2022–23.

== Personal life ==
Muran married clinical psychologist Elisa Denise Ventur in 1992 with whom he has a son Andrew Christopher Muran.

== Selected works ==
- Muran, J.C., Eubanks, C.F., Samstag, L.W., & Macdonald, J. (2026). Alliance-Focused Training: An Evidence-Based Guide to Negotiating Rupture. APA Books.
- Muran, J.C. & Eubanks, C.F. (2020). Therapist Performance under Pressure: Negotiating Emotion, Difference & Rupture. APA Books (Italian translation).
- Muran, J.C., & Barber, J.P., eds. (2010). The Therapeutic Alliance: An Evidence-Based Guide to Practice. Guilford Press (Italian translation).
- Muran, J.C., ed. (2007). Dialogues on Difference: Diversity Studies on the Therapeutic Relationship. APA Books.
- Muran, J.C., ed. (2001). Self-Relations in the Psychotherapy Process. APA Books.
- Safran, J.D. & Muran, J.C. (2000). Negotiating the Therapeutic Alliance: A Relational Treatment Guide. Guilford Press (Spanish & Italian translations).
