= Jeremy D. Safran =

Canadian-born American psychologist

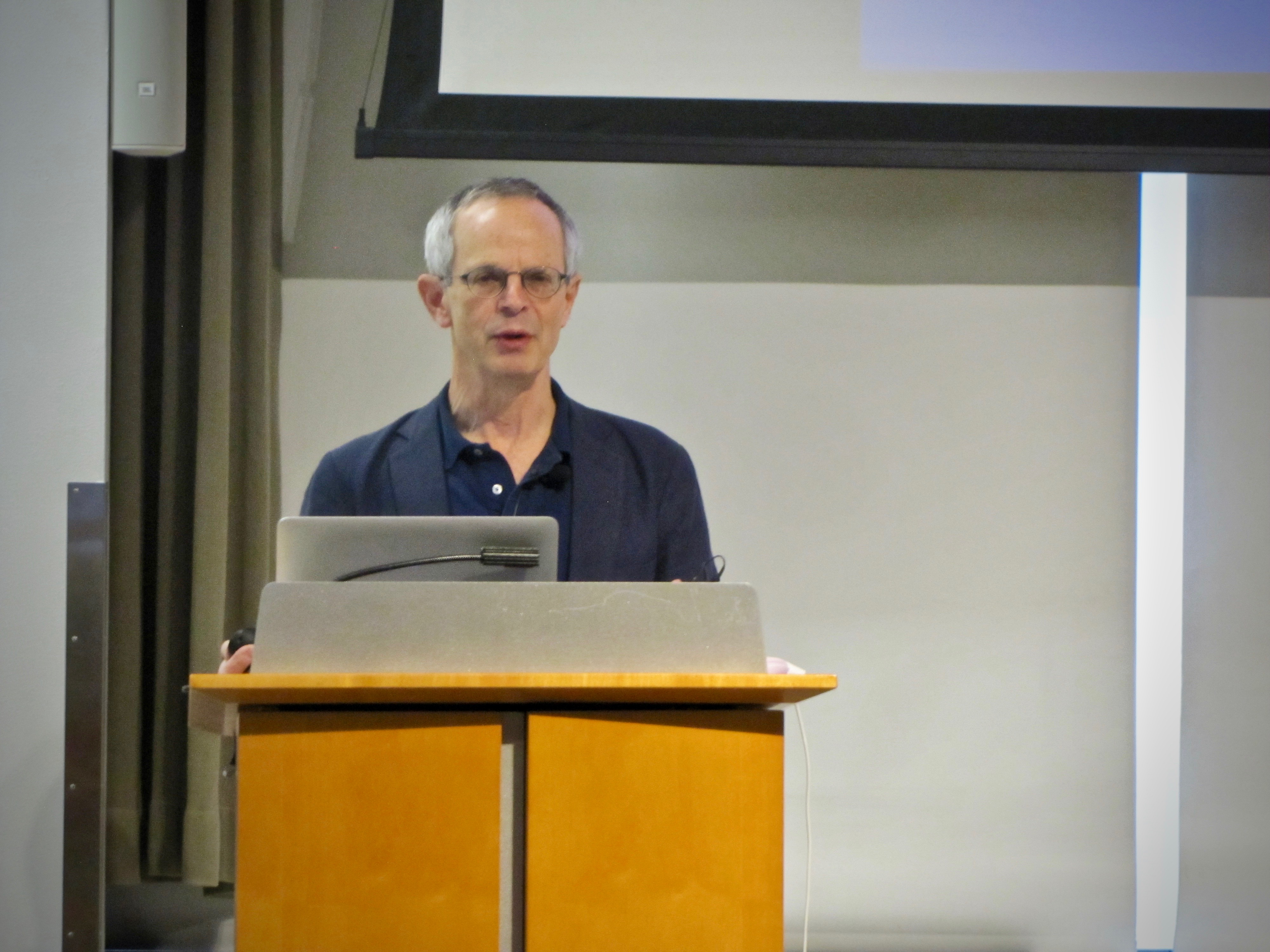
- Born: April 23, 1952
- Died: May 7, 2018 (aged 66)
- Cause of death: Murder
- Education: Ph.D., Clinical Psychology, University of British Columbia, 1982 Psychoanalytic Training, New York University,
- Occupations: Professor of Psychology, Psychoanalyst
- Organization: The New School for Social Research
- Known for: Relational Psychoanalysis, Brief Relational Therapy (BRT), Emotion-Focused Therapy (EFT), Alliance Focused Training (AFT).
- Website: safranlab.net, jeremysafran.com

Jeremy David Safran (April 23, 1952 – May 7, 2018) was a Canadian-born American clinical psychologist, psychoanalyst, lecturer, and psychotherapy researcher. He was a professor of psychology at the New School for Social Research, where he served for many years as director of clinical training. He was also a faculty member at New York University's postdoctoral program in psychoanalysis and The Stephen A. Mitchell Center for Relational Studies. He was co-founder and co-chair (along with Lewis Aron and Adrienne Harris) of The Sandor Ferenczi Center at the New School for Social Research. In addition he was past-president of The International Association for Relational Psychoanalysis and Psychotherapy.

== Early life ==
Jeremy D. Safran was born on April 23, 1952, in Calgary, Canada, to Jewish parents. Though Safran was raised Jewish and identified as culturally Jewish throughout his life, he found a spiritual home within his practice of Buddhism. Safran earned his Ph.D. in Clinical Psychology from the University of British Columbia in 1982.

== Professional life ==
After finishing his Ph.D. in 1982, Safran became the director of the Cognitive Therapy Unit at the Clarke Institute of Psychiatry in Toronto from 1986 until 1990 when he was appointed Associate Professor of Psychology at The Derner Institute for Advanced Psychological Studies at Adelphi University in Garden City, New York. Safran held this position until 1993 when he was appointed Professor of Psychology and Director of Clinical Training at The New School for Social Research in Manhattan. Safran would hold this position until his death in 2018.

Safran joined the faculty at the New School for Social Research shortly after the program had been placed on probation by the American Psychological Association. Through his work as Director of Clinical Training, Safran "not only to move the Clinical Psychology Program to full accreditation, but to make it the vibrant, respected program it is today." While at the New School for Social Research, Safran established a training collaboration with Beth Israel Medical Center (now defunct), the Sándor Ferenczi Center, The Center for Alliance-Focused Training, and the New School Psychotherapy Research Program.

Safran underwent psychoanalytic training at the Postdoctoral Program at New York University. Safran would later hold a faculty position within this program, in addition to his post at the New School for Social Research.

== Brief Relational Therapy ==
Jeremy Safran, in collaboration with J. Christopher Muran and others, developed Brief Relational Therapy (BRT). BRT is an evidence based psychotherapy which focuses on short-term treatment and integrates principles of mindfulness practice with Safran's research in Relational Psychoanalysis, emotion-focused theory, and the therapeutic alliance. The emphasis in Brief Relational Therapy is on "mindfulness-in-action" or the process of bringing mindful awareness to the patients self-defeating patterns. Self-defeating patterns, which take place outside of the patient's conscious awareness, can lead to chronic unhappiness, anxiety, emotional turbulence, isolation and other psychiatric concerns. Brief Relational Therapy focuses on helping patients become aware of and change their self-defeating patterns of thinking, feeling, and acting which play out in relationships with other. By addressing these patterns, BRT was shown to be an effective and empirically supported psychotherapy treatment.

== Contributions ==
Safran was known for his contributions in a variety of areas within psychology and psychoanalysis.

His early theoretical work in collaboration with Les Greenberg became the foundation for the development of emotion-focused therapy. He was also an early innovator in the refinement of cognitive theory and practice through his incorporation of principles from interpersonal theory and emotion theory and research.

Safran was also known for his contributions to the field of psychoanalysis, publishing numerous articles on the subject. Safran's work emphasized the development and refinement of relational psychoanalytic theory and practice. Safran was known for his writing and teaching on the topic of psychoanalysis and Buddhism.

As a psychotherapy researcher, Safran played a critical role in research on the Therapeutic Alliance and treatment impasses. His work introduced new ways of conceptualizing the Therapeutic Alliance, the function of "Ruptures" within it, and developing methods for "Repairing" it. His empirical research program in this area, in collaboration with J. Christopher Muran and other colleagues, continues to influence researchers and clinicians in North America, Europe and Latin America.

Safran published several books including: Psychoanalysis and Psychoanalytic Therapies (2012); Psychoanalysis & Buddhism: An Unfolding Dialogue (2003); "Negotiating the Therapeutic Alliance: A Relational Treatment Guide" (2000); Widening the Scope of Cognitive Therapy (1998); Interpersonal Process in Cognitive Therapy (1990); and Emotion in Psychotherapy (1987).

== Death ==
Safran was found dead in his home in Brooklyn, New York, on May 7, 2018, victim of what police believed was a botched burglary. Mirzo Atadzhanov, 28, was found hiding in the house's basement, arrested, charged, and later convicted of murder.

== Legacy ==
Safran's legacy endures in the form of a yearly memorial lecture series, hosted by the department of psychology at the New School for Social Research, in conjunction with the Sándor Ferenczi Center. Psychologist and psychoanalyst Nancy McWilliams Ph.D. was the first invited lecturer in the series.

Upon his death, Safran had a collection of nearly 3,000 books on topics ranging from psychology and psychoanalysis to religion, philosophy, art, literature, and medicine. These books, donated to the Clinical Psychology Group of the NSSR, form the basis for the Jeremy D. Safran Reading Room and Library- dedicated on December 5, 2018.

The New School Psychotherapy Program, founded by Safran, was renamed as The Safran Center for Psychological Services in his honor. The Safran Center is a low-cost clinic in New York City which provides psychodynamic psychotherapy, in the style of Safran, as well as psychological assessment to the public. The Safran Center serves as a main training clinic for students within the NSSR's Clinical Psychology Ph.D. program. The Center also maintains an active psychotherapy research program. The Safran Center names a select group of Clinical Associates each year, consisting of distinguished clinical psychologists and psychoanalysts, who serve as clinical consultants and supervisors for students.

== Publications ==
- Greenberg, L.S., & Safran, J.D. (1987). Emotion in Psychotherapy. New York: Guilford Press.
- Safran, J.D., & Muran, J.C. (eds.) (1998). The therapeutic alliance in short term psychotherapy. American Psychological Association Publications.
- Safran, J.D. & Muran, J.C. (2000). Negotiating the therapeutic alliance: A relational treatment guide. New York: Guilford.
- Safran, J.D. (ed.) (2003). Psychoanalysis and Buddhism: An Unfolding Dialogue. Boston: Wisdom Publications.
- Safran, J.D. (2012). Psychoanalysis and psychoanalytic therapies. Washington, DC: American Psychological Association Publications.
