= Positive psychotherapy =

Psychotherapeutic method developed by Nossrat Peseschkian

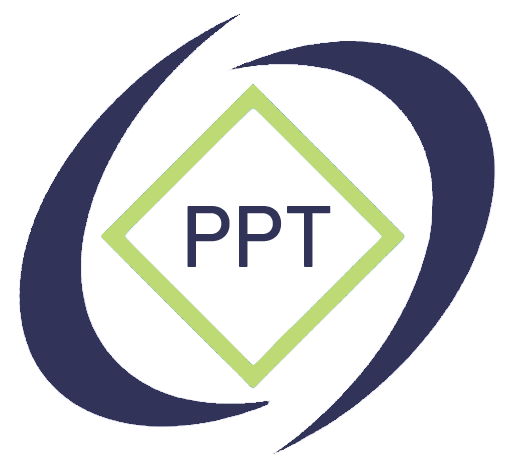
Positive and Transcultural Psychotherapy (PPT after N. Peseschkian since 1977)

Positive psychotherapy (PPT after Peseschkian, since 1977) is a psychotherapeutic method developed by psychiatrist and psychotherapist Nossrat Peseschkian and his co-workers in Germany beginning in 1968. It combines humanistic and psychodynamic principles with systemic and cognitive-behavioral elements.

Peseschkian's positive psychotherapy should is distinct from positive psychology and from the positive-based psychotherapy developed by Martin Seligman, Tayyab Rashid, and Acacia Parks in 2006. Although both therapeutic approaches are called positive psychotherapy, they have different theoretical foundations.

== Description ==
Positive psychotherapy (PPT) is a therapeutic approach developed by Nossrat Peseschkian during the 1970s and 1980s. Initially known as "differentiational analysis", it was later renamed as positive psychotherapy when Peseschkian published his work in 1977, which was subsequently translated into English in 1987. The term "positive" or "positivus" (from Latin) in PPT refers to the actual, real, and concrete aspects of human experiences.

The primary objective of positive psychotherapy and its practitioners is to assist patients and clients in recognizing and cultivating their abilities, strengths, resources, and potentials. This approach combines elements from various modalities of psychotherapy, including

- a humanistic perspective on human nature and therapeutic alliance,
- a psychodynamic understanding of mental and psychosomatic disorders,
- a systemic approach that considers family, culture, work, and environment, as well as a practical, self-help, and
- a goal-oriented five-step therapy process that integrates techniques from different therapeutic methods.

PPT is characterized by its conflict-centered and resource-oriented approach, which draws influence from transcultural observations across more than twenty diverse cultures. Positioned between manualized cognitive behavioral therapy and process-oriented analytical psychotherapy, PPT employs a semi-structured approach to diagnostics, treatment, post-therapeutic self-help, and training.

== About the founder ==
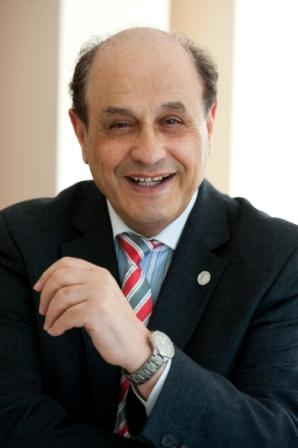
Dr. Nossrat Peseschkian

Nossrat Peseschkian, the founder of positive psychotherapy, was a German psychiatrist, neurologist, psychotherapist, and specialist in psychosomatic medicine of Iranian descent. During the late 1960s and early 1970s, he drew inspiration from various sources:

- The prevailing spirit of that era which gave rise to humanistic psychology and its subsequent advancements.
- Personal interactions with notable and influential psychotherapists and psychiatrists like Viktor Frankl, Jacob L. Moreno, and Heinrich Meng, among others.
- The humanistic and integrative principles and values of the Baháʼí Faith.
- The pursuit of an integrative approach, particularly due to the negative experiences of conflicts between psychoanalysts and behavior therapists in Germany during that time.
- Extensive transcultural observations driven by a quest for a culturally sensitive methodology.

Peseschkian is tied to the development of the approach as his life history and personality heavily influenced its creation. Peseschkian was described by his biographer as a "wanderer between two worlds"; his biography was subtitled The East and the West.

According to Peseschkian, the development of positive psychotherapy was motivated by his experience as an Iranian living in Europe beginning in 1954. It made him acutely aware of the differences in behavior, customs, and attitudes between cultures. This awareness began in childhood as he observed how his religious customs as a Bahai differed from those of his Muslim, Christian, and Jewish classmates and teachers. His experiences led him to reflect on the relationships between different religions and people, and to gain an understanding of attitudes as coming from worldviews and family concepts. During his specialty training, Peseschkian witnessed confrontations between different psychiatric, neurological, and psychotherapeutic methods—experiences that taught him the importance of discarding prejudices.

Positive psychotherapy can be traced back to the foundations of humanistic psychology and psychotherapy that were established by Kurt Goldstein, Abraham Maslow, and Carl Rogers. The strong influence of psychoanalysis and its subsequent developments, including Neo-Freudian, psychosomatic, and focus-oriented approaches like Balint's, also shaped Peseschkian's perspective. In response to these divisions, he aspired to construct a metatheory that could bridge the gaps between them. Simultaneously, certain principles of the Bahá'í Faith fascinated and inspired Peseschkian throughout his life. These principles encompassed the harmony between science and religion, the Bahá'í concept of the human being as a "mine rich in gems of inestimable value," and the vision of a global society embracing cultural diversity. These principles played a significant role in shaping his work and philosophical outlook.

The advancement of positive psychotherapy can be attributed to several factors that have contributed to its development over time. These factors include insights gained from ongoing medical education, experiences acquired through working with patients in psychotherapeutic and psychosomatic practices, interactions with individuals from diverse cultures, religions, and value systems, as well as the diverse and varied nature of psychotherapy methods. These cumulative experiences culminated in the creation of "Differentiational Analysis" in 1969, which subsequently underwent refinement and emerged as positive psychotherapy in 1977. The titles of early books authored by Peseschkian, such as Psychotherapy of Everyday Life (1974) and "In Search of Meaning" (1983), reflect the influence of psychoanalysis and existential schools of psychotherapy on the development of positive psychotherapy. Additionally, the title Positive Family Therapy (1980) underscores its parallel growth with systemic family therapy during the 1970s. In total, Peseschkian authored 29 books and numerous articles on this approach, contributing to its extensive literature and dissemination.

== Development and history ==
=== 1970–1980s ===
The 1970s marked an important period in the development and acceptance of positive psychotherapy as we know it today. It served as a turning point when PPT gained wider recognition within the field of psychotherapy. During this time, the foundational principles of PPT began to take shape and were implemented in the treatment of numerous patients and their families. These principles were also subjected to testing and were presented at international lectures, both within and outside of Germany. In this significant era, four out of the five fundamental books of PPT were published. These books include Psychotherapy of Everyday Life (originally published as Schatten auf der Sonnenuhr in 1974), Positive Psychotherapy (originally published in German in 1977), Oriental Stories in Positive Psychotherapy (originally published in German in 1979), and Positive Family Therapy (originally published in German in 1980). Moreover, the 1970s witnessed the establishment of the first postgraduate trainings in PPT, with the creation of a training organization in 1974, which later became the forerunner of the Wiesbaden Academy for Psychotherapy (WIAP). The Medical Chamber of Hesse recognized this training organization in 1979 for psychotherapy residency training. Additionally, the German Association for Positive Psychotherapy was founded in 1977, becoming the world's first national association of positive psychotherapy.

Throughout the 1980s, PPT experienced ongoing development, leading to the release of additional books, such as In Search of Meaning (originally published in German in 1983 and later translated into English in 1985). Collaborative efforts with young colleagues further contributed to the systematization of the PPT method. A significant milestone during this time was the completion of Hamid Peseschkian's dissertation in 1988, which marked the first dissertation focused exclusively on PPT. Within this dissertation, an important advancement was made in the structuring of the first interview in PPT. A questionnaire specifically designed for this initial interview was introduced and subsequently subjected to a psychodynamic study. In 1988, this questionnaire for the first interview, along with the WIPPF (questionnaire in PPT), was published with minor modifications. This precursor to the later semi-structured psychodynamic first interview was one of the early examples within the field of psychodynamic psychotherapy.

In the 1980s, Peseschkian traveled extensively to deliver PPT seminars in developing countries in Asia and Latin America. Important PPT works were translated into English during this time. Peseschkian also conducted seminars in management training and coaching, generating interest in applying PPT in these fields.

=== 1990–2010 ===
During this period, Peseschkian published his final fundamental work, Psychosomatics and Positive Psychotherapy in 1991 (German version) and later translated into English in 2013. This book introduced a structured and psychodynamic approach to treating various psychological and physical disorders.

The political changes in Central and Eastern Europe during the 1990s greatly accelerated the international expansion of PPT, which had already begun in the 1980s. PPT encountered significant interest in these cultures, which held a unique psychological position between Eastern and Western cultures. Eastern European colleagues, known for their organized working methods and thirst for knowledge, played a crucial role in systematizing PPT seminars outside of Germany. By 1990, over 30 centers were established worldwide, starting with the first one in Kazan, Russia. The first national associations for positive psychotherapy were formed in Bulgaria (1993), Romania (2004), and Russia. PPT's internationalization continued with the legal registration of the International Center for Positive Psychotherapy in 1996 as a NGO in Germany, which later evolved into the World Association for Positive and Transcultural Psychotherapy (WAPP). These developments coincided with the creation of the European Association of Psychotherapy (EAP) in Vienna in 1990, which set professional and legal standards for psychotherapy. Representatives of positive psychotherapy have been actively involved in the EAP since its inception.

In German-speaking countries, a debate on the effectiveness of various psychotherapy methods was sparked by Klaus Grawe's publication in 1994 and the ensuing discussion surrounding psychotherapy laws. In response, Peseschkian and his colleagues conducted an extensive Effectiveness Study of Positive Psychotherapy, which received the Richard Merten Prize in 1997. This study provided empirical evidence of the practical effectiveness of PPT and aligned with the growing emphasis on evidence-based practices in psychotherapy.

In 1999, an international training curriculum for advanced studies in PPT was published, drawing from experiences across different countries. The year 2000 marked the inaugural of annual International Training for Trainers in positive psychotherapy. The expansion of PPT was formalized within Germany, with the Wiesbaden Academy for Psychotherapy (WIAP) receiving governmental recognition for postgraduate residency education of psychologists in psychodynamic psychotherapy, and pedagogues and social workers in child and adolescent psychotherapy. The German law for psychotherapists of 1998, spurred further developments in the curriculum and systematization of both basic and advanced PPT training, extending its influence beyond Germany. Over the years, basic level seminars held in Eastern Europe led to the emergence of new concepts. PPT transcended its original medical context and found application in various domains, including school and university education, management training, and coaching. The first world congress of PPT was organized in 1997 in St. Petersburg, Russia, and since then every 3–4 years. In 2005, the first graduate program offering a master's degree in PPT was completed at UTEPSA University in Santa Cruz, Bolivia. The Prof.-Peseschkian Foundation, also known as the International Academy of Positive and Transcultural Psychotherapy (IAPP), was established in 2005 by Manije and Nossrat Peseschkian. It facilitates international initiatives and oversees the management of the International Archives of Positive Psychotherapy.

=== Since 2010 ===
With the passing of Nossrat Peseschkian as the founder of PPT in 2010, the PPT community entered a new phase.

The World Association for Positive and Transcultural Psychotherapy (WAPP) is the global umbrella organization for positive psychotherapy. Established in 1996 as the International Center for Positive Psychotherapy, WAPP comprises individual members, national associations, training institutes, centers, and representative offices at national and regional levels. Its primary objective is to provide support to its members and individuals interested in studying, practicing, and promoting Positive Psychotherapy. WAPP is registered as a non-profit and non-governmental organization in Wiesbaden, Germany and in 2024 boasts over 2,600 individual members across 60 countries.

Positive psychotherapy is an officially recognized modality by the European Association for Psychotherapy (EAP). The European Federation of Centers for Positive Psychotherapy (EFCPP) is an organization that operates across Europe, serving as a European Wide Organization (EWO), European Wide Accrediting Organization (EWAO), and a European Accredited Psychotherapy Training Institute (EAPTI) through the IAPP-Academy, affiliated with EAP. Aspiring psychotherapists can obtain the European Certificate of Psychotherapy (ECP) in Positive Psychotherapy by undergoing training with EFCPP.

Positive psychotherapy is a registered trademark in the United States of America (the registration No. 6,082,225). In 2016, positive psychotherapy was officially registered in both the European Union and Switzerland.

As of 2024, national associations for PPT have been established in Bulgaria, Georgia, Germany, Romania, Kosovo, Ukraine, and Ethiopia. Furthermore, PPT is actively promoted through more than 50 local or regional training centers in Armenia, Austria, Belarus, Bulgaria, China, Cyprus, Georgia, Germany, Kosovo, Latvia, North Macedonia, Poland, Romania, Russia, Turkey, Ukraine, and the United Kingdom. Seminars and lectures on PPT have reached more than 80 countries worldwide. Notably, PPT is now included in the curricula for psychology and psychotherapy programs at universities in Bulgaria, Russia, Ukraine, and Turkey.

== Theory ==
=== Main characteristics ===
The foundations of PPT are rooted in scientific theories that can also be found in other therapies. However, Peseschkian's method combines elements of psychodynamic and humanistic psychotherapy theories and practices to create a transcultural psychotherapy approach. PPT also implements an integrative approach that considers the individual needs of the client, salutogenetic principles, family therapy, and self-help tools.

Main characteristics of the PPT method:

- Integrative psychotherapy method
- Humanistic psychodynamic method
- Cohesive, integrated therapeutic system
- Conflict-centered short-term method
- Cultural-sensitive method
- Use of stories, anecdotes, and wisdoms
- Innovative interventions and techniques
- Application in psychotherapy, other medical disciplines, counselling, education, prevention, management, and trainings.

=== Main principles ===
The three main principles or pillars of Positive Psychotherapy are:

- The Principle of Hope
- The Principle of Balance
- The Principle of Consultation

The Principle of Hope suggests that therapists aim to help patients comprehend and perceive the meaning and purpose behind their disorder or conflict. Consequently, the disorder is reframed in a "positive" manner, leading to positive interpretations. Here are a few examples:

- Sleep disturbance is viewed as the ability to remain alert and manage with limited sleep.
- Depression is seen as the capacity to deeply experience and express emotions in response to conflicts.
- Schizophrenia is considered as the ability to exist simultaneously in two worlds or a vivid fantasy realm.

By adopting this optimistic perspective, a shift in viewpoint becomes possible not only for the patient but also for their surroundings. Thus, illnesses serve a symbolic function that both the therapist and patient need to acknowledge. The patient learns that the symptoms and complaints of the illness act as signals to restore balance to the four dimensions of their life.

The Principle of Balance acknowledges that despite social and cultural variations, all individuals tend to rely on common coping mechanisms when dealing with their problems. Nossrat Peseschkian, in conjunction with the Balance Model of Positive Psychotherapy, has developed a dynamic and contemporary approach to conflict resolution across different cultures. This model highlights four fundamental aspects of life:

- Body/Health – psychosomatic concerns.
- Achievement/Work – factors contributing to stress.
- Contact/Relationships – potential triggers for depression.
- Future/Fantasy/Meaning of Life – fears and phobias.

While these four domains are inherent in all humans, Western societies tend to prioritize the areas of physical well-being and professional success, whereas the Eastern hemisphere places greater emphasis on interpersonal connections, imagination, and future aspirations (a transcultural aspect of Positive Psychotherapy). Insufficient contact and lack of imagination are known to contribute to various psychosomatic illnesses.

Each individual develops their own coping preferences when confronted with conflicts. However, when one particular mode of conflict resolution dominates, other modes may be overshadowed. The contents of conflicts, such as punctuality, orderliness, politeness, trust, time, and patience, are categorized as primary and secondary capacities, built upon the foundational capacities of love and knowledge. This can be seen as a content-based differentiation of Freud's classical model of the id, ego, and superego.

The Principle of Consultation introduces the concept of the five stages of therapy and self-help, which are closely intertwined in Positive Psychotherapy. In these stages, both the patient and their family are collectively informed about the illness and the individualized solution for it. The five stages are as follows:

1. Observation and Distancing: This stage involves perceiving and expressing desires and problems while maintaining a certain level of emotional detachment.
2. Taking Inventory: Cognitive capacities come into play as the patient reflects on significant life events that have occurred within the past 5 to 10 years.
3. Situational Encouragement: Self-help and activating internal resources become the focus at this stage. The patient is encouraged to draw upon past successes in resolving conflicts.
4. Verbalization: The communicative capacities of the patient are emphasized, enabling them to articulate and express outstanding conflicts and problems related to the four dimensions of life.
5. Expansion of Goals: This stage aims to foster a forward-looking orientation in life once the problems are resolved. The patient is prompted with questions like, "What would you like to do when all problems have been solved? What are your goals for the next five years?"

These five stages encompass a comprehensive approach to therapy and self-help, providing a framework for addressing the various aspects of an individual's well-being and promoting their personal growth and future aspirations.

=== Positive psychotherapy as a metatheory ===
Peseschkian's initial goal was twofold: firstly, to create a method that patients could easily understand and utilize, and secondly, to offer positive psychotherapy as a mediator between different psychotherapy schools. In his book Positive Psychotherapy (published in 1977 in German and 1987 in English), he devoted an entire chapter to this challenge, entitled "Positive Psychotherapy and Other Psychotherapies" (pages 365–400). Peseschkian regarded this chapter as the most challenging and labor-intensive one in the book. He emphasized that positive psychotherapy should not be perceived as just another method within the field of psychotherapy. Instead, it provides a comprehensive framework that enables the selection of appropriate methodological approaches for specific cases and facilitates the alternation between these methods. In essence, positive psychotherapy represents a metatheory of psychotherapy. It views psychotherapy not merely as a fixed method to address specific symptom profiles, but also as a response to the broader societal, transcultural, and social contexts in which it operates.

Also Peseschkian insisted that positive psychotherapy should not be seen as a closed and exclusive system; instead, it assigns significance to different psychotherapeutic methods. It embraces various approaches such as psychoanalytic, psychodynamic, behavior therapy, group therapy, hypnotherapy, medication-based treatment, and physical therapy. Positive psychotherapy can be considered an integrative method that incorporates multiple dimensions of therapy.

It took almost two decades before Klaus Grawe and his colleagues in Switzerland published a meta-analysis on the effectiveness of various psychotherapy approaches and proposed a general method that transcended traditional schools of psychotherapy. In the United States, Jerome Frank published a scheme for integrated psychotherapy, but this plan was also met with controversy and was not accepted. The movements for eclectic and integrative psychotherapy, which have found increasing acceptance since that time, have nonetheless skirted the core goal of theoretical integration and largely settled for the peripheral function of employing techniques from various schools. Today, there is a growing consensus that factors such as the therapeutic alliance, empathy, expectations, cultural adaptation, and the therapist's personality are more important than specific methods and techniques.

=== Positive approach ===
Positive psychotherapy emphasizes the mobilization of existing capacities and potential for self-help instead of primarily focusing on eliminating existing disturbances. The therapy begins with the possibilities for development and capacities of the individuals involved(Peseschkian N., pp. 1–7), following the approach of Maslow who coined the term "positive psychology" to highlight the importance of focusing on positive qualities in people. Symptoms and disorders are viewed as reactions to conflicts, and the therapy is called "positive" because it recognizes the wholeness of the individuals involved, including both the pathogenesis of illness and the salutogenesis of joys, capacities, resources, potentials, and possibilities. (Jork K, Peseschkian N., p. 13).

The term positive in positive psychotherapy is based on the "positive sciences" concept (based on Max Weber, 1988), which means a judgment-free description of the observed phenomenon. Nossrat Peseschkian uses the term positum in a broader sense, meaning that which is available, given, or actual. This positive aspect of the illness is just as important for the understanding and clinical treatment of the affliction as the negative aspect. The therapy aims to mobilize existing capacities and potential for self-help and focuses on the possibilities for development and capacities of the individuals involved, rather than just treating them as a "bag of symptoms." Peseschkian believes that symptoms and disorders are reactions to conflicts, and the therapy is called "positive" because it proceeds from the concept of the wholeness of the persons involved as a given.

The concept of positive psychotherapy is based on a humanistic view of human nature, which emphasizes the inherent goodness and potential of individuals. According to PPT, people have two basic capacities: to love and to know, and through education and personal development, they can further develop these capacities and their unique personalities. Therapy, in this context, is seen as a tool for promoting further growth and education for the patient and their family.

In positive psychotherapy, disorders are reframed in a positive light. Depression, for instance, is viewed as “the capacity to react to conflicts with deep emotionality”; fear of loneliness is seen as “the desire to be with other people”; alcoholism is reinterpreted as “the capacity to supply oneself with warmth (and love) that is not received from others”; psychosis is considered as “the capacity to live in two worlds at the same time”; and cardiac disorders are seen as “the capacity to hold something very close to one’s heart”.

The positive process involved in PPT results in a shift in perspective for all parties involved, including the patient, their family, and the therapist/physician. Instead of focusing solely on the symptom, attention is directed towards the underlying conflict. Furthermore, this approach allows for the identification of the "real patient”, who is often not the one seeking treatment, but rather a member of their social environment. By interpreting illnesses in a positive light, patients are encouraged to understand the potential function and psychodynamic significance of their illness for themselves and those around them, and to recognize their abilities rather than just their pathologies.

=== Basic and actual capacities ===
Conflicts in everyday life as well as inner conflicts, which can lead to psychological disturbances and illness, often are connected to actual value judgments. Behind them stand concepts for instance of love or justice or of values such as orderliness, trust or patience, characteristics which in positive psychotherapy are called actual capacities. Ways of behaving, values, virtues and conflictual ideas are connected to specific contents of actual capacities which are present in all cultures. Each person reacts in his own way to a concept which he has learned and developed during the course of his or her life, one which is impressed upon him or her by individual experience, and which has become an inherited model through culture and education. Punctuality or trust, for example, will be treated differently by two different people in comparable situations. Conflicts leading to distress and even physical reactions often result from divergent concepts regarding the active actual capacities, in the example punctuality or trust. The different valuations of concepts result from differing cultural and family concepts. The importance of punctuality or trust in comparison to contact, achievement or justice are seen as different from one individual to another. This can lead to conflicts but also to exchange, learning and broadening of a person's concepts. In 1977, Nossrat Peseschkian introduced the term "actual capacities"

According to Peseschkian every person possesses two basic capacities: The capacity to love, expressed in the primary capacities as emotional needs, and the capacity to know, developed with the secondary actual capacities, the social norms. The capacity to love finds its expression in the primary actual capacities such as patience, time, and trust. The capacity to know finds its expression in the secondary actual capacities such as punctuality, cleanliness, and orderliness: "We structure our experiences with the help of the capacity to know... It contains the capacity to learn (to collect experiences) and to teach (to give experiences to others).”

Actual Capacities
Primary Capacities (Capacities to love)	Secondary Capacities (Capacities to know)
Love/Acceptance	Punctuality
Modeling	Cleanliness
Patience	Orderliness
Time	Obedience/Discipline
Contact	Politeness/Appropriateness
Sexuality/Tenderness	Openness/Honesty
Trust	Fidelity
Confidence	Justice
Hope	Diligence/Achievement
Belief	Thrift
Doubt	Dependability
Certainty	Exactness
Unity	Conscientiousness
Emotional needs and the capacity for relationships (achieved through modeling)	Social norms and formation of relationships (achieved through education)

Peseschkian developed the "Differentiational Analytical Theory" (, p. 25) as a complement to the psychoanalysis of that time, which was concerned primarily with the psychosexual phases of development (for example, oral, anal and oedipal), development of autonomy and conflicts between the id and the super-ego. The Differentiation Analysis asks which specific content arises in earlier stages: The parents' patience, the development of trust, the experience of love in unconditional acceptance is a developmental psychological prerequisite for successful development in the oral phase. These capacities, known as "primary", are imprinted on the child by the direct behavior of the parents and through their modeling. Primary capacities such as having patience (with oneself or others), having trust (in oneself, in others, or in fate), having and giving time, are basic necessities for the development of the newborn child. The child needs warmth, time, patience and empathetic, unconditional acceptance in order to develop her/his own age-appropriate inner balance.

The primary actual capacities of the first reference person a child develops a relationship with is what makes it possible to relate to oneself, to be at peace with oneself, to perceive oneself, to develop a consciousness of oneself and the world and finally to deal appropriately with inner and outer conflicts. The primary capacity of “patience” is prerequisite for appropriate impulse control, the capacity "trust" is required for inner support, warmth and a feeling of safety.

The secondary actual capacities such as punctuality, politeness, openness, justice or fidelity often play a role as social norms in resolving conflicts and misunderstandings. Similarly, “orderliness” is one of the most frequent contents of conflicts between parents and children in occidental cultures, also between the couples themselves. "Justice", a secondary capacity, and the experience of injustice must be faced and balanced again and again, loving acceptance, taking time to understand and being patient. "Obedience" as an expression of discipline is for historic reasons not much prized in democratic Germany, but despite this, it is generally accepted as a fact of life and seen as constructive in the schools and the inherent freedom to make decisions is set aside by the necessity to obey the rules. This, however, is one of the most frequent conflict factors in education. In psychotherapy, conflicts of the superego stand out in situations marked by religion as triggers for guilt conflicts.

It is noteworthy from a transcultural perspective that in Oriental cultures, primary capacities such as love, trust and contact are more highly valued, while secondary capacities such as orderliness, punctuality and cleanliness are more sharply pronounced in Western cultures. The emphasis is determined even in early childhood, for example, when the baby's feeding times are set down and clear rules as to the exact time for the main meal are laid down, as well as other such rules. These differences often lead to misunderstandings, but also to conflicts and judgments.

Positive psychotherapy analyzes the specific content of the conflicts as triggers for the emotions and focuses in counseling or therapy on the inner and outer conflicts or values and the capacities which are the contents of these conflicts. The emotions which lead to suffering, or the physical symptoms can then be understood as values functioning in a conflict of opposite concepts. In this connection the conflict-centered process focuses less on the triggers than on identifying and then working through the conflict which caused them.

=== Transcultural approach ===
The integration of a transcultural perspective into psychotherapy was not only a primary focus of Nossrat Peseschkian from the outset, but also held a sociopolitical significance for him. Nossrat Peseschkian emphasizes the importance of a transcultural approach in positive psychotherapy, as it is a recurring theme throughout the method. This perspective offers valuable insights for understanding individual conflicts and holds significant social implications. Issues such as immigration, development aid, interactions with individuals from different cultures, transcultural marriages, addressing prejudices, alternative models from diverse cultural backgrounds, and political challenges arising from transcultural situations can all be addressed using this approach.

The inclusion of cultural factors and the recognition of the unique nature of each treatment has expanded the applicability of PPT and made it an effective method for use in multicultural societies. PPT has been taught and practiced by psychotherapists in over 70 countries, and it can be considered a transcultural approach to psychotherapy. Therefore, the principles of PPT form the foundation for defining and constructing the field of transcultural psychotherapy, which is essential for psychotherapy education, continuing education, and the recognition and adoption of new psychotherapy disciplines.

The meaning of "transcultural" in PPT can be understood in two ways:

1. Firstly, it refers to the recognition of the unique characteristics of patients who come from different cultural backgrounds, which is also known as intercultural or migrant psychotherapy.
2. Secondly, it involves considering cultural factors in every therapeutic relationship to broaden the therapist's repertoire and promote a sociopolitical awareness.

PPT is a culture-sensitive method (concept of "unity in diversity") that can be adapted to various cultures and life situations and should not be viewed as a form of Western “psychological colonization”. Nossrat Peseschkian highlights the significance of the social aspect in positive psychotherapy, suggesting that it can be applied broadly to various social relationships, such as those between groups, peoples, nations, and cultural groups. By doing so, a comprehensive social theory may be established, focusing on interaction challenges, human abilities, and economic circumstances.

Transcultural psychotherapy is not just a comparison between different cultures but a comprehensive concept that focuses on the cultural dimensions of human behavior. It seeks to understand how people are different and what they have in common. PPT uses examples from other cultures to help patients broaden their own repertoire of behavior and relativize their own perspective. Tools such as stories, tales, social norms, and the Balance Model are used to promote a transcultural perspective. In 1979, Nossrat Peseschkian used the term "transcultural psychotherapy" and dedicated a chapter to it in his book The Merchant and the Parrot: Oriental Stories in Positive Psychotherapy. He believed that the solution of transcultural problems will be one of the major tasks of the future due to the increasing importance of transcultural difficulties in private life, work, and politics. The principle of transcultural problems becomes the principle of relationships between people and of dealing with inner conflicts, ultimately becoming the object of psychotherapy.

=== First interview in positive psychotherapy ===
Peseschkian developed a semi-structured first interview, which is one of the few in the field of psychodynamic psychotherapy. Hamid Peseschkian's dissertation, presented in 1988, was the first doctoral dissertation dealing with PPT. The first interview in PPT was first structured in this dissertation, a questionnaire for this first interview was presented and a psychodynamic study of it was undertaken. This precursor to the later semi-structured psychodynamic first interview was a significant contribution to psychodynamic psychotherapy and was published in 1988 along with the WIPPF questionnaire on PPT.

The first interview in psychotherapy is a crucial component that can be compared to a medical examination and history-taking in somatic medicine. It serves several purposes, including diagnosis, therapy planning, prognosis, and hypothesis generation. In PPT, the first interview involves a diagnostic approach similar to that of a medical history, but also considers relationship factors and the therapeutic alliance. It acknowledges the impact of expectations, including the hope for effective therapy (Snyder, 193–212, Frank). Due to its semi-structured nature and adaptable concepts, it can be applied in various contexts such as individual therapy, couples therapy, family therapy, counseling, and coaching, and is suitable for diverse cultural settings.

The first interview in PPT is a semi-structured interview that includes both mandatory and optional questions. Depending on the answers given to the mandatory questions, the therapist may or may not ask the optional questions. The questions can be open-ended or closed, and are designed to gather information for diagnostic, therapeutic, prognostic, and hypothesis-formulating purposes ( p.31). The interview can be used during the initial meeting or early sessions as part of the preliminary phase of therapy, and can also be used for orientation purposes in the first session, with the therapist going into greater depth on particular areas during subsequent sessions. The first interview is applicable to a wide range of settings, including therapy with individuals, children, youth, couples, and families, as well as counseling and coaching, and can be adapted to different cultures.

=== Balance model ===
The Balance model is widely recognized and can be applied in various fields, including therapy, self-help, and family therapy. It is comparable to Freud's concept of libido, Adler's life goals, and Jung's four functions of perception, ratio, sensitivity, and intuition. The Balance Model offers a structural representation of the personality and enables the identification of areas in which an individual may be lacking. By addressing these areas, a new balance can be achieved, leading to a synthesis within the therapy.

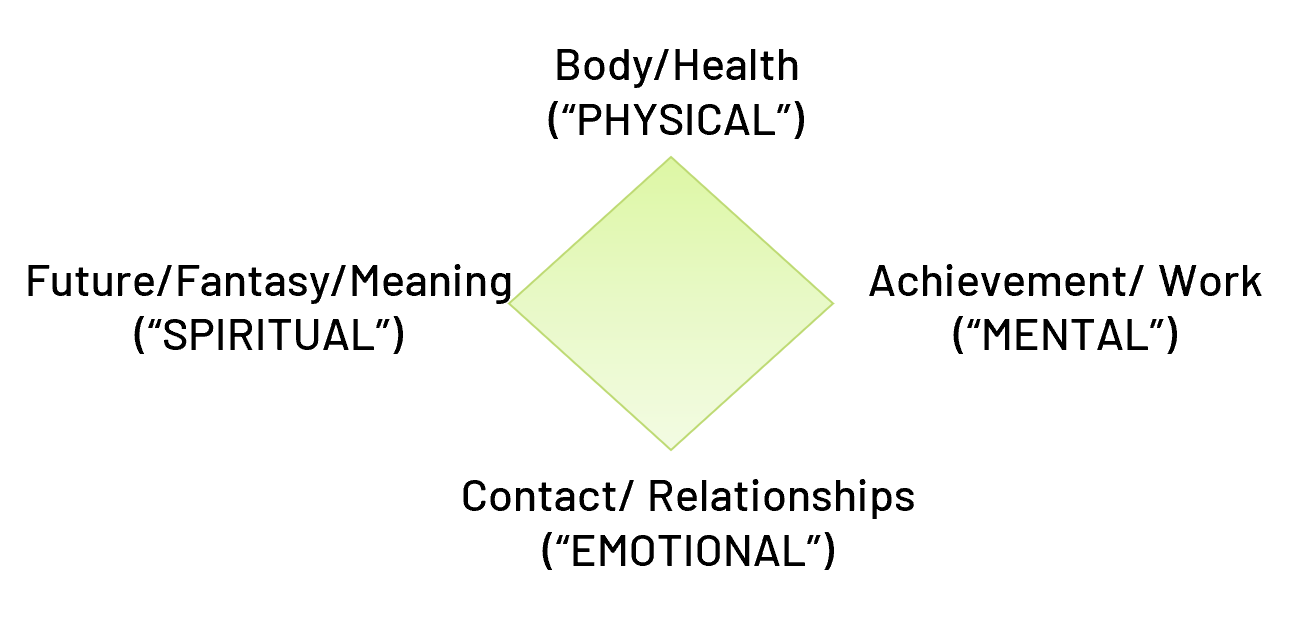
Balance Model in positive psychotherapy developed by Nossrat Peseschkian

The Balance Model is based on the concept that there are essentially four areas of life in which a human being lives and functions, and that significantly impact an individual's overall satisfaction, self-worth, and ability to cope with challenges. These areas serve as key indicators of an individual's personality in the present moment and encompass the biological-physical, rational-intellectual, socio-emotional, and imaginative, value-oriented aspects of daily life. While all individuals possess the potential for each of these areas, some may be more prominent or neglected based on variations in education and environment. Life energies, activities, and reactions are influenced by and connected to these four areas:

1. Physical activities and perceptions, such as eating, drinking, tenderness, sexuality, sleep, relaxation, sports, appearance, and clothing;
2. Professional achievement and capabilities, such as a trade, household duties, gardening, basic and advanced education, and money management;
3. Relationships and contact styles with partners, family, friends, acquaintances and strangers; social engagements and activities;
4. Future plans, religious/spiritual practices, purpose/meaning, meditation, reflection, death, beliefs, ideas and development of vision or imagination-fantasy.

The aim of the Balance Model is to restore equilibrium among the four areas of life. In psychotherapeutic treatment, the objective is to assist the patient in identifying their own resources and utilizing them to achieve a dynamic balance. Specifically, this entails prioritizing a balanced allocation of energy, with each area receiving dynamically an equal proportion (25%) rather than an equal amount of time. Prolonged one-sidedness can lead to conflicts and illnesses, among other negative outcomes.

=== Model Dimensions ===
Assessing the impact of early childhood experiences on a patient is a crucial and difficult task in psychodynamic psychotherapy. In PPT, the Model Dimensions concept, also known as "examples", "role models", or "forms of love", is used as a tool to describe the pattern of family concepts that shape an individual's experience and development. Early upbringing and environment influence the unique development and expression of the basic capacities for love and knowledge, as described by Nossrat Peseschkian. The Balance Model illustrates the means of the capacity to know, while the four model dimensions illustrates the means of the capacity to love.

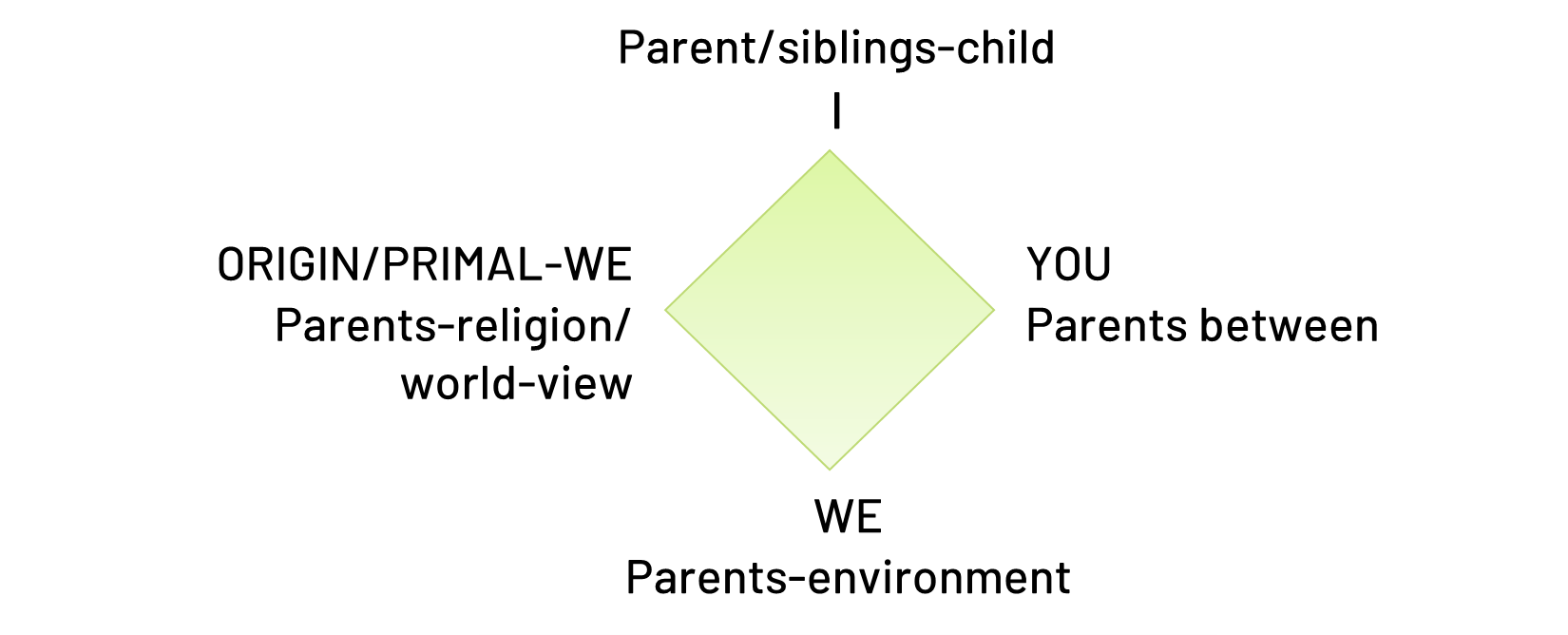
The four model dimensions of positive psychotherapy

The use of the four model dimensions in PPT extends the analytic self and object theories of Kohut and Kernberg by introducing not only the "I" dimension, but also the "You," "We," and "Primary We" dimensions. The "You" dimension represents the relationship of the patient's parents or primary care takers amongst each other, while the "We" dimension includes the parents'/primary care takers experiences with others. The "Primary We" dimension, which is unique to PPT, describes the relationships between the patient's primary care takers such as parents and grandparents and their life philosophy or religious beliefs. By incorporating these four subject relations, PPT expands on the self-object theories and establishes itself as a distinctive approach that could potentially influence the future of psychodynamic therapies.

1. Dimension "I" is the model dimension that focuses on an individual's relationship with themselves and their life-long struggles, such as self-esteem, self-confidence, self-image, and basic trust versus basic distrust. These issues are largely influenced by the individual's childhood experiences and their relationship with their parents and siblings. During childhood, individuals learn to form a relationship with themselves based on how their wants and needs are fulfilled.
2. Dimension "You" refers to an individual's relationship with others, specifically with their romantic partner. The primary model for this relationship is the example set by the individual's parents, particularly in their own relationship with each other. The behavior and interactions between parents serve as a model for the possible ways of behaving in a partnership, influencing how the individual forms their own relationship with their romantic partner.
3. Dimension "We" concerns an individual's relationship to their social surroundings and is largely influenced by their parents' relationship with their own social environment. Through socialization, attitudes towards social behavior and achievement norms are transferred from parents to their children. These attitudes and expectations are related to social ties beyond the immediate family, such as relationships with relatives, colleagues, social reference groups, interest groups, compatriots, and humanity as a whole. The ways in which parents interact with and navigate these social relationships shape their children's understanding and approach to social behavior.
4. Dimension "Origin/Primal-We" refers to an individual's relationship with their origin or primal community, which is largely influenced by their parents' attitude towards meaning, purpose, spirituality/religion, and worldview. This dimension is not solely based on formal membership in a religious community but is fundamental to the question of meaning that arises later in life. Even if an individual rejects religion, their relationship with their origin or primal community remains important as the basis for other systems of orientation that are expected to provide meaning and purpose.

=== Conflict model ===
Peseschkian's psychodynamic Conflict model (refer to Figure) highlights the differentiation of content, which is the focal point of contention, and its internal evaluation. The model distinguishes between the actual conflict that arises in a burdensome situation, the pre-existing basic conflict, and the unconscious inner conflict that causes physical and/or mental symptoms. The term "conflict" (from the Latin confligere, meaning to clash or fight) refers to the apparent incompatibility of inner and outer values and concepts or an internal ambivalence. Emotions, affective states, and physical reactions can be understood as signal indicators of an inner conflict of values and the distribution of actual capacities. Therefore, in PPT, the question is asked about the content: what causes or triggers this emotion?

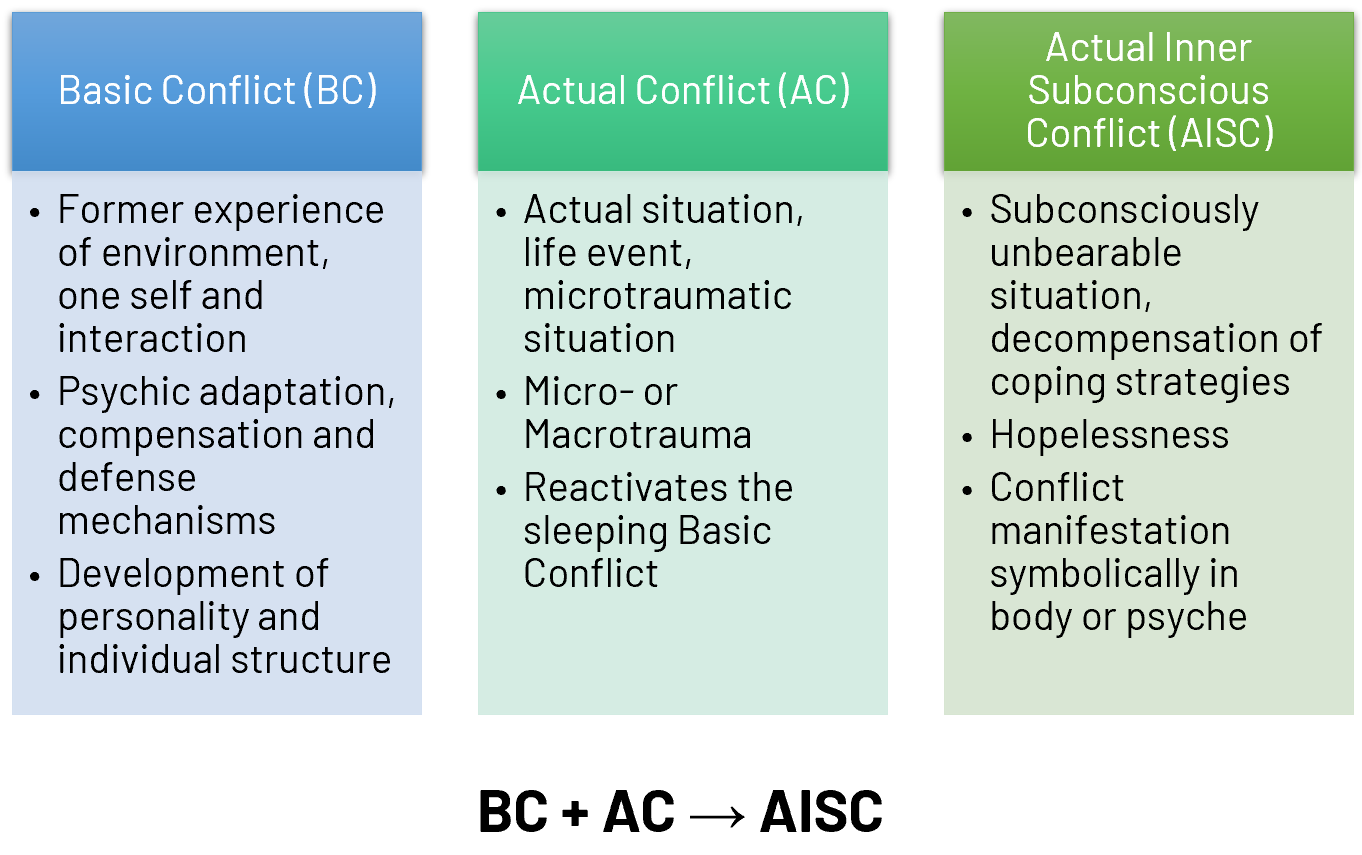
The concept of the three main conflicts in PPT

Peseschkian's concept of "microtrauma" refers to the accumulation of small, repetitive psychic injuries that cause microstress or “trivia, or trifles” ( p. 80), and can trigger inner conflicts. These microtrauma are different from major life events or macrotrauma. They are considered to be conflict content and are related to the actual capacities that individuals possess, which enable them to form relationships but can also become a source of conflict. In an actual conflict, when coping mechanisms are overburdened, an old unconscious basic conflict may arise, pitting primary emotional needs such as trust, hope, or tenderness against secondary capacities or social norms such as orderliness, punctuality, justice, or openness. When the previous compromise that worked to resolve the basic conflict is no longer effective, an inner conflict arises, leading to symptoms that are seen as attempts at a solution. These conflict reactions can be represented using the Balance Model, even though they cannot bring about a resolution, they still have an impact.

When certain abilities, morals, ideas, or principles are consistently used without adaptation to the current circumstances, it can lead to disorders. If family concepts or compromises made in the past continue to be repeated, an unconscious inner conflict can arise, which can cause psychological, psychosomatic, or physical disturbances. These symptoms serve as a way for the patient to express something unconsciously and have a specific significance for everyone. The goal of PPT is to strengthen neglected areas and underdeveloped capacities within the therapeutic relationship and daily life, allowing patients to effectively resolve conflicts and achieve inner and outer balance.

=== Narrative approach using stories and wisdom ===
A special technique used in PPT is the therapeutic use of tales, stories, and proverbs, which was first introduced by Nossrat Peseschkian in his work Oriental Stories as Tools in Psychotherapy – The Merchant and the Parrot in 1979. While hypnotherapy (Milton Erickson) had used this approach, it was not common in psychodynamic therapy until Peseschkian's work. Unlike Carl Gustav Jung, who focused on fairy tales, the Peseschkian method employs a wider range of narrative therapy and association tools. “Using stories and parables from the Orient and other cultures, an effort is made to recognize and further a person’s potential for self-help. With reference to the symbolic meaning of proverbs and old words of wisdom drawn from many cultures, the person to whom they are told is led in psychotherapy to a more positive view of himself” ( p. 92).

The intended therapeutic effect of surprise that results from the use of Eastern stories, which may initially seem unfamiliar in European culture, has been proven effective not only in other cultures ( pp. 24–34). Stories serve multiple functions in therapy, including creating norms for self-comparison and questioning established norms to view them as relative. In the first stage of therapy, these stories can lead to a change in perspective, which is then used in subsequent stages. Such narratives can also facilitate the release of emotions and thoughts, often playing a critical role in therapy. Storytelling in therapy serves as a mirror that allows readers or listeners to identify with the characters and their experiences, reflecting on their own needs and situations. By presenting solutions, stories can act as models that patients can compare with their own approach, leading to broader interpretations and the potential for change. Additionally, storytelling is particularly effective in helping patients who are resistant to change and who cling to old and outdated ideas.

=== Five-step concepts ===
The five-step concepts used in individual and family therapy, similar to the five fingers of each hand, closely resemble the natural process observed in group psychotherapy described by Raymond Battegay, psychodrama described by Moreno, and further education of people as described by Alfred Adler. What sets Peseschkian's approach apart is the systematic application of this process model to psychotherapy. The five-step procedure serves as a roadmap for both the therapist and the client to find the most effective means of self-help. Research in therapy has shown that the better we handle challenging therapy situations and reflect on the therapeutic relationship, the more successful the outcome of therapy is likely to be.

The three stages of interaction in therapy (attachment, differentiation, detachment) involve a 5-stage process of communication, which is utilized both within individual sessions and throughout the course of therapy.

1. The first step is acceptance, observation, and distancing, which involves a shift in perspective.
2. The second step involves taking inventory, differentiating the contents and background of the conflict and the patient's strengths.
3. The third step is situational encouragement, where self-help and resources are developed.
4. The fourth step involves working through the conflict through verbalization.
5. The fifth and final step, called broadening of the goals, involves reflecting on, summarizing, and testing new concepts, strategies, and perspectives with a future-oriented focus.

This structured communication approach is unique to the Peseschkian method and contributes to successful therapy outcomes. This therapeutic process is focused on the future and change, and it involves using concepts from the past that are effective for the present. Additionally, concepts from other psychotherapy disciplines are used when appropriate (integrative aspect). The patient and their surroundings actively participate in understanding the illness process (self-help).

The 5 stages in PPT serve as a structure for communication within a therapy session or throughout the entire therapeutic process, which would otherwise lack direction. Through the use of appropriate understanding, leading questions, stories, association triggers, and revisiting previous themes, the therapist facilitates the patient's storytelling and reflection. The process gives both the therapist and the patient a starting point and a sense of security, preparing the patient to work through conflicts and engage in self-help, especially after the therapy has ended.

== Application ==
=== Fields of application of PPT ===
The method of positive psychotherapy, which was originally developed for psychotherapy, has expanded beyond its traditional application and has been applied in various fields such as counselling, pedagogy, and social work. In Germany, PPT has been used in counselling since 1992, while in Bulgaria, it has been used in pedagogy since the same year. In China, it has been used to train social workers about mental health disorders, coping with families, and preventing burnout since 2014. PPT has also been used as a basis for specialized training programs in children and youth therapy in Bulgaria since 2006, and later in Ukraine and Russia. Professionals from various countries such as Germany, Bulgaria, Cyprus, Turkey, Kosovo, China, Bolivia, and Ukraine have specialized in PPT-based positive family therapy and counselling. As a result, PPT has become a means of sharing psychotherapeutic competences and experiences across different professional and cultural fields.

Originally designed as a fundamental positive psychosomatic treatment for mental health, psychosomatic medicine, prevention, and psychotherapy, Positive Psychotherapy has been utilized by numerous medical doctors in Germany. The approach has been implemented in a number of hospitals, as well as in the Wiesbaden Academy of Psychotherapy's state-approved training program for psychodynamic therapy in Germany.

=== Outside of psychotherapy ===
Positive psychotherapy has found application in a wide range of settings, including education and schools, the psychology of religion, trainings for teachers, time management, various counseling contexts, management training, seminars for partnership or marriage preparation, recruiting, trainings for jurists and mediators; the armed forces, society, officers, and politicians; intercultural trainings, naturopathy and order therapy (also known as mind-body medicine), burnout prevention, and supervision. Additionally, PPT is utilized in coaching, family counseling, and general counseling.

== Treatment ==
=== Practice ===
Positive psychotherapy is utilized for the treatment of various mental health conditions, including mood (affective) disorders, neurotic disorders, stress-related disorders, somatoform disorders, and certain behavioral syndromes as classified in the ICD-10 (chapters F3-5). It has also shown promise in addressing personality disorders to some extent (chapter F6). PPT has been successfully integrated with traditional individual therapy and has been found beneficial in couple, family, and group therapy settings. Additionally, PPT has been applied in the field of psychiatry, demonstrating its effectiveness when working with (post)psychotic patients and in group settings within psychiatric hospitals, where the utilization of stories and anecdotes has proven to be particularly impactful.

=== Self-help ===
Peseschkian's books are specifically intended for non-experts seeking self-help. His works, like The Psychotherapy of Everyday Life (1977 German, 1986 English), are designed to assist individuals in handling misunderstandings. Similarly, In Search of Meaning (1983 German and 1985 English) provides guidance on navigating life crises. Furthermore, books like If You Want Something You Never Had, Then Do Something You Never Did (2011) concentrate on resolving interpersonal conflicts. Moreover, individuals can pursue specialized courses to become certified counselors in Positive Psychotherapy, enabling them to facilitate conflict moderation and promote self-help during challenging situations.

== Trainings ==
=== PPT trainings ===
WAPP's main postgraduate training program is divided into three parts. These parts are designed in a sequential order, i.e., they need to be completed successively starting with the lowest level.

- Basic Consultant of Positive Psychotherapy (200 h – incl. theory and self-discovery).
- Candidate Certified Positive Psychotherapist (710 h – incl. theory, supervision, and self-discovery).
- European Certified Positive Psychotherapist (1400 h – incl. theory, practice, supervision, and self-discovery).

The courses are split up into modules of 3 or 4 days each, spread over several months depending on the kind of course. Training of Positive and Transcultural Psychotherapy consist of three content parts:

- Theory. Learning all basic concepts and tools of Positive and Transcultural Psychotherapy.
- Self-discovery/self-experience. Primarily, educational self-experience should assist students (candidates, residents, trainees) in developing a psychodynamic psychotherapeutic identity. The self-reflection of the student should be strengthened and developed. They should encounter their own central inner conflict and their own personality structure. They should experience themselves how psychotherapy works, and how challenging it can be. The personal experience of the unconscious is the central aspect of psychodynamic self-discovery. Even educational self-discovery deals with personal issues, it is not personal therapy. The student is not a patient, but a future colleague and a future psychotherapist. If during the educational self-discovery the student and/or his trainer find out that there are many personal unsolved issues, then the student should go into personal therapy. This further means that a personal therapy cannot be counted as an educational self-experience.
- Supervision is an essential component of Positive Psychotherapy, encompassing both individual and group formats. In PPT, supervision goes beyond simply understanding the therapeutic situation and aims to develop the supervisee's skills and capabilities based on their own needs and those of their patients. Group supervision is common in PPT, as the structured process lends itself well to practical benefits and a didactic effect. The most frequent format involves focusing on one case during a session with one supervisee, with the rest of the group acting as participants, including the supervisor. This approach allows the supervisor to engage the other participants as co-supervisors, enriching the supervisee's perspective on the case with additional viewpoints and diverse perspectives from the entire group.

=== PPT certification ===
After successful completion of each PPT course the participant receives a certificate issued by the World Association for Positive and Transcultural Psychotherapy (WAPP), signed by the main trainer of the course and the President of the Association. WAPP certifies trainers of Positive Psychotherapy. Only trainers who are accredited trainers of WAPP are permitted to sign and hand out official WAPP certificates.

=== Training standards ===
WAPP has developed universal Training Standards for the postgraduate trainings in Positive Psychotherapy. These standards are obligatory for everyone. The standards may differ in some countries. But the WAPP defined standards are the minimum requirements, which need to be fulfilled.

=== Trainer education ===
WAPP trains and certifies trainers for Basic and Master Courses (; p. 26):

- Basic Course Trainer for Positive Psychotherapy
- Master Course Trainer for Positive Psychotherapy

Certified Positive Psychotherapists who would like to become trainers for PPT themselves can participate in a training program for trainers including an examination and the accompaniment of a complete course as a candidate-trainer.

=== International gatherings and training projects ===
The World Association for Positive Psychotherapy organizes regular national and international gatherings, e.g., conferences, trainer seminars and world congresses. Since the year 2000, annual International Training Seminars and since 1997 seven World Congresses have taken place.

=== Development and international network ===
The main emphasis of positive psychotherapy during the past 40 years has been treatment, training and publication.

In 1979, the Wiesbaden Postgraduate Training Institute for Psychotherapy and Family Therapy was established as a postgraduate training for physicians in Wiesbaden, Germany. In 1999, the Wiesbaden Academy for Psychotherapy (WIAP), a state-licensed, postgraduate psychotherapy academy with a large outpatient clinic, was established for the training of psychologists and educational scientists.

The international head office is based in Wiesbaden, Germany. Positive psychotherapy is represented internationally by the World Association of Positive and Transcultural Psychotherapy (WAPP). Its international governing board of directors is elected every two years. There are national and regional associations in some ten countries.

PPT and its therapists have been engaged in the international development of psychotherapy, and are active members of international and continental associations.

== Research ==
=== Research advances and applications ===
The first publications in the area of PPT date back to 1974. Since then, this method has been presented in numerous books, scientific works, and other publications. PPT fulfills the four principles postulated by Grawe for the effectiveness of psychotherapy:

- activation of resources,
- actualization,
- management of problems,
- therapeutic clarification.

A study on the effectiveness and quality assurance of Positive Psychotherapy was conducted between 1994 and 1997 by 32 members of the German Association for Positive Psychotherapy under the guidance of Nossrat Peseschkian, Karin Tritt, and Birgit Werner. The study aimed to substantiate the claim that PPT is a classical, integrative form of therapy ( p. 9) based on Grawe's model. It was conducted under controlled conditions and was the first of its kind and the results show PPT short-term method to be effective.

The longitudinal effectiveness study conducted by the German Association for Positive Psychotherapy examined the efficacy of PPT in daily clinical practice. A total of 402 patients with various mental health disorders were treated by 22 therapists trained in PPT, including physicians, psychologists, and teachers. The patients were compared to a control group of 771 individuals on a waiting list for therapy due to somatic illnesses. The percentages represent the proportion of patients with different types of disorders: 23.6% had depressive disorders, 19.8% had anxiety and panic disorders, 21.2% had somatoform disorders, 20.5% had adjustment disorders, 8.2% had personality disorders, 3.4% had addictions, and 3.4% were newly diagnosed with somatic disorders. The study employed a battery of psychometric tests, including SCL-90R, VEV, Gießen-Test, WIPPF, IPC, IIP-D, GAS, and BIKEB, to measure the effectiveness of PPT. The study also included a retrospective interrogation of patients after the termination of PPT at intervals of 3 months to 5 years in three groups of 84, 91, and 46 patients. The study found positive results in terms of the effectiveness of PPT in treating various mental health disorders. This means that the positive effects of PPT were maintained even after a significant amount of time had passed since the end of therapy. The study also found that patients treated with PPT reported a significant improvement in their quality of life, as measured by the Gießen-Test (p ≤ 0.005), and in their interpersonal relationships, as measured by the Interpersonal Check List (IPC) and Inventory of Interpersonal Problems (IIP-D) (p ≤ 0.005). In addition, patients treated with PPT showed a significant increase in their coping ability, as measured by the Coping Capacity Scale (BIKEB) (p ≤ 0.005). Overall, the study demonstrated that PPT is an effective form of therapy for a range of mental health disorders, and that its positive effects can be maintained over time (p ≥ 0.05; VEV: F = 1179; SCL-90-R: F = 2473)

During the discussion, the researchers explored the dilemma of choosing between an experimental design that prioritizes internal validity versus one conducted under controlled conditions to achieve high external validity. They acknowledged the unfortunate lack of effectiveness studies and highlighted that the experimental design employed in this study could be viewed as a significant strength. The computer-assisted quality assurance study on Positive Psychotherapy (PPT) received the Richard Merten Prize in 1997, which is one of the most prestigious prizes in the healthcare sector in Europe. The prize has been awarded by the trustees since 1992 with the aim of recognizing exceptional work that contributes to the improvement of medical, pharmaceutical, or nursing treatment and represents a noteworthy advancement in medical, social, sociopolitical, or economic progress within the healthcare industry.

=== Academic works ===
The widespread applicability and cultural suitability of PPT are attributed to the numerous colleagues who are motivated and supported to conduct scientific research. Furthermore, many practitioners who have been exposed to PPT find their interest in publishing rekindled since they are no longer bound by the limitations and requirements of a particular school. There is evidence that around 5 postdoctoral dissertations and nearly twenty doctoral dissertations have been published on PPT, mainly from Germany, Russia, Bulgaria, and Ukraine. Additionally, approximately 50 bachelor's and master's theses have been written on the subject.

Most of the research on PPT has centered on its applications in psychosomatic, medical, psychiatric, psychological, and pedagogical fields. This focus provides a glimpse into the potential areas of future scientific inquiry. A review of the topics covered in these academic works indicates that PPT has a wide range of clinical and non-clinical applications, with particular attention given to certain models.

In addition to research on psychosomatics in different organ systems, there are also comparative and transcultural studies. These studies have focused on the unique aspects of the therapeutic relationship and how it can be applied to educational contexts. Some of the research has been conducted within the social-pedagogical framework, highlighting the potential applications and possibilities of "Positive Pedagogy."

=== Publications ===
Publications on positive psychotherapy consist of the wide-ranging source material written by its founder and of the work of his students. These scholarly publications have been joined by works of popular science that have appeared in diverse periodicals and do not appear in lists of scientific literature. Peseschkian wrote 29 books that have been translated into as many as 23 languages. The most widespread book is Oriental Stories as Tools in Positive Psychotherapy: The Merchant and the Parrot. Other core books are Psychotherapy of Everyday Life, Positive Psychotherapy, Positive Family Therapy, and Positive Psychotherapy in Psychosomatic Medicine. In his final years, Peseschkian published a number of self-help books dedicated to various areas of life.

Starting with the founding of the German Journal of Positive Psychotherapy in 1977, colleagues in PPT have been encouraged to publish the results of their research and share their cases. Additionally, the source publications of Peseschkian began to accrue secondary publications beginning in the 1990s. As new national associations for positive psychotherapy have been formed in various countries during the last 20 years, journals of PPT have been founded in Russia, Ukraine, Bulgaria, and Romania.

List of some of the main PPT publications are:

- Peseschkian, Nossrat (1987). Positive Psychotherapy – Theory and Practice of a New Method. Berlin: Springer-Verlag. ISBN 978-0-387-15794-8. (translated) (first German edition 1977)
- Peseschkian, Nossrat (2016). Oriental Stories as Techniques in Positive Psychotherapy. Bloomington, USA: AuthorHouse. ISBN 978-1524660871. (first German edition 1977)
- Peseschkian, Nossrat (2016). In Search of Meaning: Positive Psychotherapy Step by Step. Bloomington, USA: AuthorHouse. ISBN 978-1524631611. (first German edition 1983)
- Peseschkian, Nossrat (2016). Positive Family Therapy: Positive Psychotherapy Manual for Therapists and Families. Bloomington, USA: AuthorHouse. ISBN 978-1524662042. (first German edition 1980)
- Peseschkian, Nossrat (2016). Positive Psychosomatics: Clinical Manual of Positive Psychotherapy. Bloomington, USA: AuthorHouse. ISBN 978-1524636616.
- Peseschkian, Nossrat (2016). Positive Psychotherapy of Everyday Life: A Self-Help Guide for Individuals, Couples and Families with 250 Case Stories. Bloomington, USA: AuthorHouse. ISBN 978-1524631437.(first German edition 1974)
- Messias, Erick; Peseschkian, Hamid; Cagande, Consuelo, eds. (2020). Positive Psychiatry, Psychotherapy and Psychology. Clinical Applications. Springer Nature Switzerland AG. ISBN 978-3-030-33263-1.

=== PPT Journal ===
The Global Psychotherapist (JGP) is a digital journal that focuses on positive psychotherapy, following the principles established by Peseschkian since 1977. It serves as an interdisciplinary platform for publishing articles related to the practice and utilization of the humanistic-psychodynamic approach of positive and transcultural psychotherapy. The journal operates on a semi-annual basis, releasing issues in January and July. Articles submitted to JGP undergo a rigorous double-blind peer review process to ensure the quality and integrity of the publication. The journal accepts articles in English, Russian and Ukrainian languages.

- ISSN: 2710-1460 (online)
- DOI: 10.52982/197700

The Global Psychotherapist adheres to an open access policy that promotes the free dissemination of scientific information and encourages global knowledge exchange, with the ultimate aim of fostering social progress. The journal firmly believes in providing unrestricted access to its content to benefit the wider community. Authors have the freedom to choose the license under which their work is published, while retaining full rights to their content.

Furthermore, the editorial policy of the journal allows authors to deposit any version of their published articles in a repository of their choosing, whether it be an institutional repository or any other suitable platform, without any embargo period. This ensures that the research output remains accessible and readily available for the benefit of the scholarly community.
