= Clara E. Hill =

American professor of psychology

- Born: September 13, 1948 (age 78); Shivers, Simpson County, Mississippi, U.S.
- Education: Southern Illinois University Carbondale
- Scientific career
- Fields: Counseling psychology, dreamwork, psychotherapy
- Workplaces: University of Maryland, College Park

Clara E. Hill (born September 13, 1948) is an American professor of psychology specializing in counseling psychology, dreamwork, and psychotherapy research. She has served as a faculty member at the University of Maryland, College Park since 1974. Hill was the 1995 president of the Society for Psychotherapy Research and editor of the Journal of Counseling Psychology from 1994 to 1999.

== Life ==
Hill was born on September 13, 1948, in Shivers, Simpson County, Mississippi. She earned a B.A. (1970) in psychology and an M.A. (1972) and Ph.D. (1974) in counseling psychology from the Southern Illinois University Carbondale. As an undergraduate research assistant, she worked under Alfred Lit from 1967 to 1970. She was a research assistant of John Snyder from 1970 to 1971. Hill completed an internship in the counseling center at the University of Florida from 1973 to 1974.

In 1974, Hill joined the University of Maryland, College Park department of psychology as an assistant professor. She was promoted to associate professor in 1978 and professor in 1985. Hills' career influences included Bill Anthony, Bruce Fretz, Paul G. Schauble, and John Snyder. She developed novel procedures to identify "moment-by-moment interactions between counselor and client." Hill also established new techniques pertaining to dreamwork. In 1990, Hill was president of the North American Society for Psychotherapy Research. From 1994 to 1999, she was the editor of the Journal of Counseling Psychology. Hill was the 1995 president of the Society for Psychotherapy Research. As Hill's career came to a close, having published 220 journal articles and 14 books, she retired from the University of Maryland in 2023.

== Selected works ==
- Hill, C. E. (1989). Therapist techniques and client outcomes: Eight cases of brief psychotherapy. Newbury Park, CA: Sage.
- Hill, C. E. (1996). Working with dreams in psychotherapy. New York: Guilford Press.
- Hill, C. E., & O'Brien, K. (1999). Helping skills: Facilitating exploration, insight, and action. Washington DC: American Psychological Association.
- Hill, C. E. . Meaning in life: A therapist’s guide. Washington DC: American Psychological Association.
