= Psychodynamic Diagnostic Manual =

Psychoanalytic diagnostic handbook

The Psychodynamic Diagnostic Manual (PDM) is a diagnostic handbook similar to the International Statistical Classification of Diseases and Related Health Problems (ICD) or the Diagnostic and Statistical Manual of Mental Disorders (DSM). The first edition of the PDM was published on May 28, 2006. The second edition was published on June 20, 2017. The third edition was published on January 6, 2026.

The information contained in the PDM was collected by a collaborative task force which includes members of the American Psychoanalytic Association, the International Psychoanalytical Association, the Division of Psychoanalysis (Division 39) of the American Psychological Association, the American Academy of Psychoanalysis and Dynamic Psychiatry, and the National Membership Committee on Psychoanalysis in Clinical Social Work.

== Taxonomy ==
=== Dimension I: Personality Patterns and Disorders ===
This first dimension classifies personality patterns in two domains. First, it looks at the spectrum of personality types and places the person's personality on a continuum from unhealthy and maladaptive to healthy and adaptive. Second, it classifies how the person "organizes mental functioning and engages the world".

The task force adds, "This dimension has been placed first in the PDM system because of the accumulating evidence that symptoms or problems cannot be understood, assessed, or treated in the absence of an understanding of the mental life of the person who has the symptoms". In other words, a list of symptoms characteristic of a diagnosis does not adequately inform a clinician how to understand and treat the symptoms without proper context. By analogy, if a patient went to her physician complaining of watering eyes and a runny nose, the symptoms alone do not indicate the appropriate treatment. Her symptoms could be a function of seasonal allergies, a bacterial sinus infection, the common cold, or she may have just come from her grandmother's funeral. The doctor might treat allergies with an antihistamine, the sinus infection with antibiotics, the cold with zinc, and give her patient a Kleenex tissue after the funeral. All four conditions may have very similar symptoms; all four condition are treated very differently.

=== Dimension II: Mental Functioning ===
Next, the PDM provides a "detailed description of emotional functioning" which are understood to be "the capacities that contribute to an individual's personality and overall level of psychological health or pathology". This dimension provides a "microscopic" examination of the patient's mental life by systematically accounting for their functional capacity to:

- Process information
- Self-regulate
- Establish and maintain relationships
- Experience, organize, and express feelings and emotions at different levels
- Represent, differentiate, and integrate experience
- Utilize appropriate coping strategies and defense mechanisms
- Accurately observe oneself and others
- Form internal values and standards

=== Dimension III: Manifest Symptoms and Concerns ===
The third dimension starts with the DSM-IV-TR diagnostic categories; moreover, beyond simply listing symptoms, the PDM "goes on to describe the affective states, cognitive processes, somatic experiences, and relational patterns most often associated clinically" with each diagnosis. In this dimension, "symptom clusters" are "useful descriptors" which presents the patient's "symptom patterns in terms of the patient's personal experience of his or her prevailing difficulties". The task force concludes, "The patient may evidence a few or many patterns, which may or may not be related, and which should be seen in the context of the person's personality and mental functioning. The multi dimensional approach... provides a systematic way to describe patients that is faithful to their complexity and helpful in planning appropriate treatments".

== Editions ==
=== The first edition (PDM) ===
With the publication of its third edition in 1980, the DSM switched from a psychoanalytically influenced dimensional model to a "neo-Kraepelinian" descriptive symptom-focused model based on present versus absent symptoms. The PDM provides a return to a psychodynamic model for the nosological evaluation of symptom clusters, personality dimensions, and dimensions of mental functioning. The PDM is not intended to compete with the DSM or ICD. The authors of the first edition claims the work emphasizes "individual variations as well as commonalities" by "focusing on the full range of mental functioning" and serves as a "[complement to] the DSM and ICD efforts in cataloguing symptoms". The task force intends for the PDM to augment the existing diagnostic taxonomies by providing "a multi dimensional approach to describe the intricacies of the patient's overall functioning and ways of engaging in the therapeutic process." The first edition of the PDM has a new perspective on the existing diagnostic system, enabling clinicians to describe and categorize personality patterns, related social and emotional capacities, unique mental profiles, and personal experiences of the patient.

The first edition of the PDM aims to be based in scientific research, which it combines with concepts adapted from the classical psychoanalytic tradition; for example, it traces many anxiety disorders to the four basic danger situations described by Sigmund Freud in 1926: the loss of a significant other, the loss of love, the loss of body integrity, and the loss of affirmation by one's own conscience. Upon the publication of the first edition, Theodore Millon expressed a positive opinion of the manual's attempt to "give a sense of context, richness, and detail to the understanding of mental disorders", while also cautioning against over-committing to any single theoretical viewpoint. Robert Spitzer, the principal architect of the DSM-III, called the manual "impressive" but warned that its authors "now have to demonstrate that it's reliable and feasible to use clinically", which he described as a "very complex" task.

=== The second edition (PDM-2) ===
Guilford Press published a second edition of the PDM (PDM-2), developed by a steering committee that included Vittorio Lingiardi (Editor), Nancy McWilliams (Editor), and Robert S. Wallerstein (Honorary Chair). Guilford Press received a manuscript for PDM-2 in September 2016, and the release date was June 20, 2017.

Like the PDM-1, the PDM-2 classifies patients on three axes: "P-Axis - Personality Syndromes", "M-Axis - Profiles of Mental Functioning", and "S-Axis - Symptom Patterns: The Subjective Experience". The P-Axis is intended to be viewed as a "map" of personality instead of a listing of personality disorders as in the DSM-5 and ICD-10. The PDM-2 defines different terms as part of the P-Axis, including "personality", "character", "temperament", "traits", "type", "style", and "defense". The S-Axis is similar to the DSM and ICD due to the inclusion of predominantly psychotic disorders, mood disorders, disorders related primarily to anxiety, event- and stressor-related disorders, somatic symptom disorders, and addiction disorders.

=== The third edition (PDM-3) ===
The third edition of the PDM (PDM-3) was published on January 6, 2026. The PDM-3 follows the same basic structure as its predecessors, including the three-axis taxonomy. The descriptions of psychological experiences that may require clinical attention have been expanded and now get their own chapters. The parts of the book corresponding to age phases are reordered, so that the book now begins with a discussion of infancy and proceeds chronologically to late adulthood. The previous version of the PDM uses the term "borderline" both in the context of Otto Kernberg's theory of levels of personality organization (including healthy, neurotic, borderline, and psychotic levels) and in the context of the DSM-defined borderline personality disorder; to reduce confusion, the PDM-3 instead uses the term "emotionally dysregulated personality disorder" for the DSM concept, reserving "borderline" for an intermediary level of personality organization between neurotic and psychotic.

== See also ==
- Diagnostic and Statistical Manual of Mental Disorders
- DSM-IV Codes
- International Statistical Classification of Diseases and Related Health Problems
- ICD-10
- Research Domain Criteria (RDoC), a framework being developed by the National Institute of Mental Health
