= Nossrat Peseschkian =

German psychiatrist, founder of Positive Psychotherapy

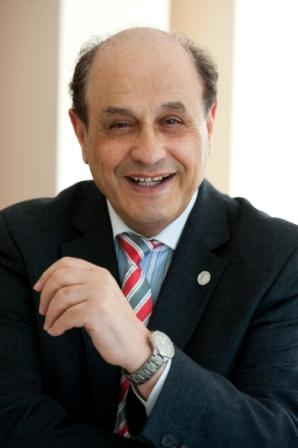
Nossrat Peseschkian

Nossrat Peseschkian (Persian: نصرت پزشکیان; 18 June 1933 – 27 April 2010) was an Iranian-born German specialist in neurology, psychiatry, psychotherapy and psychosomatic medicine. Peseschkian founded positive psychotherapy in 1968 based on a cross-cultural approach; he was also the founder of the Wiesbaden Academy of Psychotherapy (WIAP), a German state-licensed postgraduate institute of psychotherapy.

== Biography ==
Born and raised in Iran, Nossrat Peseschkian went to Germany in 1954 for his studies in medicine at the universities of Freiburg, Frankfurt am Main and Mainz. After his medical specialty training and dissertation, he did postgraduate training in psychotherapy in Germany, Switzerland, Austria and the United States. As an international lecturer, Peseschkian traveled to 67 countries. A global network of over fifty local, regional and national centers of positive psychotherapy has been established in 33 countries. Most of his trainings focused on Germany, Ausftria, Switzerland and Luxemburg.

Peseschkian authored 26 books on his technique; some of them have been translated into 23 languages. Pesechkian debuted his method of positive psychotherapy, a psychodynamic method with a cross-cultural and humanistic background, in 1968. In 1977, the German Association for Positive Psychotherapy was founded. Internationally, positive psychotherapy is represented by the World Association of Positive Psychotherapy. Swiss psychiatrist G. Benedetti explained in 1979: "His model is a notable synthesis of psychodynamic and behavior-therapeutic elements, making an essential contribution to a unified relationship within psychotherapy".

Peseschkian was, up to the date of his death, the head of the International Academy for Positive and Transcultural Psychotherapy, the president of the World Association for Positive Psychotherapy, and Honorary President of the German Association for Positive Psychotherapy. He was an honorary professor at the National Psychoneurologic Institute Bechterew in St. Petersburg, Russia. In 1996, he received the Federal Order of Merit from the president of Germany. Peseschkian was a member of the Baháʼí Faith.

He was married to Manije Peseschkian (1940–2020), a family therapist. They had two sons, both physicians practicing psychiatry and psychotherapy (Hamid Peseschkian (b. 1962); Nawid Peseschkian (b. 1964)), and four grandchildren. His grave is in Wiesbaden-Sonnenberg, and was recognized by the Wiesbaden City Council on 17 March 2023 as a grave of honor.

== Publications ==
Amongst Peseschkian's books and publications (mostly in German, some English, Chinese and Russian and other languages) are:

- If You Want Something You Never Had, Then Do Something You Never Did, by Nossrat Peseschkian, published 2006, Sterling Publishers Pvt., Limited, ISBN 1-84557-509-1
- Positive Psychotherapy Theory and Practice of a New Method, by Peseschkian, Nossrat (Walker, Robert R, Dr. Translator), Publisher: Springer-Verlag, Berlin, 1987, ISBN 978-0-387-15794-8 (first German edition 1977 by Fischer Verlag)
- Oriental Stories as Tools in Psychotherapy: the Merchant and the Parrot, by Peseschkian, Nossrat, Publisher: Springer-Verlag, 1986 ISBN 978-0-387-15765-8 (first German edition 1979 by Fischer Verlag)
- In Search of Meaning, by Peseschkian, Nossrat, Publisher: Springer ISBN 978-0-387-15766-5 (first German edition 1983 by Fischer Verlag)
- Positive Family Therapy, by Peseschkian, Nossrat, Publisher: Springer ISBN 978-0-387-15768-9, republished Sterling Publishers Pvt. Ltd, India ISBN 978-81-207-1839-5 (first German edition 1980 by Fischer Verlag)
- Psychotherapy of Everyday Life: Training in Partnership and Self Help With 250 Case Histories, by Peseschkian, Nossrat, Publisher: Springer ISBN 978-0-387-15767-2 (first German edition 1974 by Fischer Verlag)
- Positive Psychotherapy in: Globalized Psychotherapy by Alfred Pritz (Ed.), Publisher: Facultas, 2002 ISBN 3-85076-605-5
- Religion and Science from the Viewpoint of the Baháʼí Faith in: Psychotherapy in East and West. Proceedings of the 16th International Congress of Psychotherapy. Publisher: Korean Academy for Psychotherapists 1994

Over 260 articles in professional journals in Germany and international academic publications.

== Awards and honors ==
- In 1997 Nossrat Peseschkian was awarded the Richard Mertens Prize for his work, “Computer Assisted Quality Assurance in Positive Psychotherapy”. This Prize is one of the most highly endowed in the healthcare sector in Germany.
- In 1998 the Federal Medical Chamber of Germany awarded Peseschkian the Ernst von Bergmann Plaque for Services in Continuing Medical Education for Physicians in Germany.
- In June 1998, President Prof. B.D. Karvarrarsky nominated Peseschkian as an honorary member of the Russian Association for Psychotherapy. The ceremony took place in Moscow.
- In January 2006, Peseschkian received the Order of Merit, Distinguished Service Cross of the Federal Republic of Germany. (Bundesverdienstkreuz). The President of the Federal Republic of Germany, Dr. Horst Köhler, signed the Document. "This Order is the highest recognition of the Federal Republic of Germany for those citizens who have acquired distinguished services and achievements in social-economical, political and spiritual fields as well as their particular services for the Republic for example social charity and humanitarian aid."
- In June 2006 the Association of Iranian Physicians and Dentists in Germany honored Peseschkian and two other nominees - among the Iranian Physicians - with an award of recognition for their significant scientific contribution to the field of medicine and health in the world.
- In November 2006 Peseschkian was one of the honourees of the Encyclopædia Iranica at the Geneva Gala. Encyclopædia Iranica is a branch of Columbia University in New York, United States.
