= Psychotherapy Research =

- Discipline: Psychotherapy
- Language: English
- Edited by: Christoph Flückiger, Jeffrey A. Hayes

Publication details
- History: 1990-present
- Publisher: Routledge on behalf of the Society for Psychotherapy Research
- Frequency: Bimonthly
- Impact factor: 2.984 (2019)

Standard abbreviations
- ISO 4: Psychother. Res.

Indexing
- CODEN: PRSECG
- ISSN: 1050-3307 (print); 1468-4381 (web)
- LCCN: 92659531
- OCLC no.: 21464424

Links
- Journal homepage; Online access; Online archive

Psychotherapy Research is a bimonthly peer-reviewed academic journal covering research on all aspects of psychotherapy. It is published by Routledge on behalf of the Society for Psychotherapy Research. The founding team of editors consisted of David Alan Shapiro (Leeds University), Hans Strupp, and Klaus Grawe. The current editors are Christoph Flückiger (University of Zürich) and Jeffrey A. Hayes (Penn State University).

== Abstracting and indexing ==
The journal is abstracted and indexed in MEDLINE, Scopus, Social Sciences Citation Index, Psychological Abstracts, PsycINFO, and PsycLIT. According to the Journal Citation Reports, the journal has a 2019 impact factor of 2.984.

== See also ==
- List of psychotherapy journals
