= Journal of Consulting and Clinical Psychology =

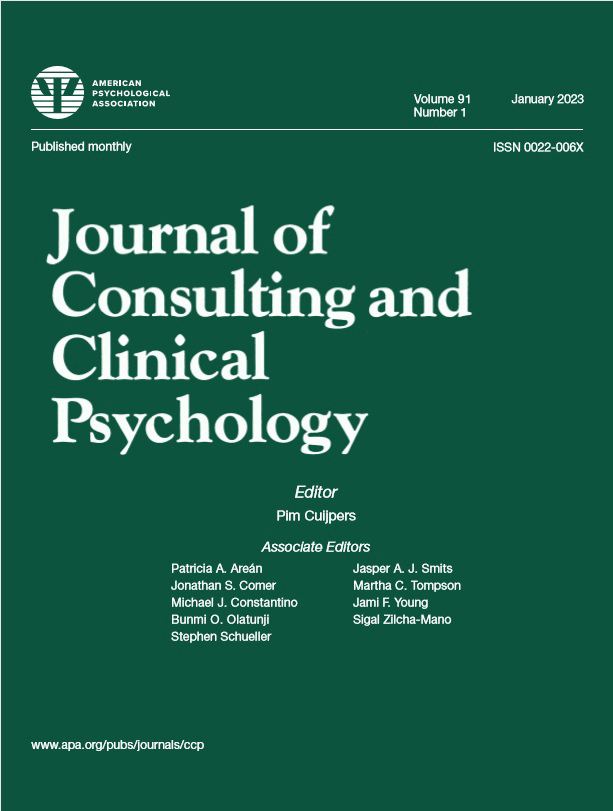
- Discipline: Psychology
- Language: English
- Edited by: Pim Cuijpers

Publication details
- Former name: Journal of Consulting Psychology
- History: 1937–present
- Publisher: American Psychological Association
- Frequency: Monthly
- Impact factor: 5.0 (2024)

Standard abbreviations
- ISO 4: J. Consult. Clin. Psychol.

Indexing
- CODEN: JCLPBC
- ISSN: 0022-006X (print); 1939-2117 (web)
- LCCN: 2002210225
- OCLC no.: 1590721

Links
- Journal homepage; Online archive

The Journal of Consulting and Clinical Psychology is a monthly peer-reviewed academic journal published by the American Psychological Association. It covers research on treatment and prevention in all areas of clinical psychology. The editor-in-chief is Pim Cuijpers (Vrije Universiteit Amsterdam).

== History ==
The journal was established in 1937 by the Association of Consulting Psychologists as the Journal of Consulting Psychology, obtaining its current name in 1968.

== Abstracting and indexing ==
The journal is abstracted and indexed in:

- CINAHL
- Current Contents/Social and Behavioral Sciences
- EBSCO databases
- Embase
- Index Medicus/MEDLINE/PubMed
- International Bibliography of Periodical Literature
- International Bibliography of the Social Sciences
- Modern Language Association Database
- ProQuest databases
- PsycINFO
- Scopus
- Social Sciences Citation Index

According to the Journal Citation Reports, the journal has a 2024 impact factor of 5.0.

== See also ==
- Experimental and Clinical Psychopharmacology
- Clinical Practice in Pediatric Psychology
