= Journal of Clinical Psychology =

- Discipline: Clinical Psychology, psychotherapy
- Language: English
- Edited by: Daniel R. Strunk, Giancarlo Dimaggio (In Session)

Publication details
- History: 1945–present
- Publisher: Wiley-Blackwell
- Frequency: Monthly
- Impact factor: 2.116 (2011)

Standard abbreviations
- ISO 4: J. Clin. Psychol.

Indexing
- CODEN: JCPYAO
- ISSN: 0021-9762 (print); 1097-4679 (web)
- LCCN: med47001542
- OCLC no.: 01348731

Links
- Journal homepage; Online access; Online archive

The Journal of Clinical Psychology is a monthly peer-reviewed medical journal covering psychological research, assessment, and practice. It was established in 1945. It covers research on psychopathology, psychodiagnostics, psychotherapy, psychological assessment and treatment matching, clinical outcomes, clinical health psychology, and behavioral medicine.

Each year, four of the monthly issues are dedicated to In Session, a section that focuses on clinical issues that may be encountered by psychotherapists. In Session is editorially independent from the main journal. From 1995 - 1999 it was published as a separate journal titled, In Session: Psychotherapy in Practice.

From time to time, the journal publishes special issues, containing a selection of articles related to a single particularly timely or important theme.

According to the Journal Citation Reports, the journal has a 2011 impact factor of 2.116, ranking it 31st out of 109 journals in the category "Psychology, Clinical."
