= Clinical Practice in Pediatric Psychology =

- Discipline: Pediatric psychology
- Language: English

Publication details
- History: 2013-present
- Publisher: American Psychological Association (United States)
- Frequency: Quarterly

Standard abbreviations
- ISO 4: Clin. Pract. Pediatr. Psychol.

Indexing
- ISSN: 2169-4826 (print); 2169-4834 (web)
- LCCN: 2012200671
- OCLC no.: 808635952

Links
- Journal homepage; Online access

Clinical Practice in Pediatric Psychology is a quarterly peer-reviewed academic journal published by the American Psychological Association on behalf of APA Division 54. It covers all aspects of pediatric psychology. The inaugural editors-in-chief were Jennifer Shroff Pendley (Nemours Foundation/Alfred I. duPont Hospital for Children) and W. Douglas Tynan (Nemours Health and Prevention Services). The current editor-in-chief is Christina Duncan (West Virginia University). The journal was established in 2013 and is abstracted and indexed in PsycINFO and Scopus.
