= Hans Herrman Strupp =

German psychotherapist (1921–2006)

Hans Hermann Strupp (August 25, 1921 – October 5, 2006) was born in Frankfurt, Germany and died in the U.S. He moved from Nazi Germany to the U.S. and he pursued a PhD in Psychology at George Washington University in Washington, D.C. where the Department of Psychiatry granted him with a Certificate in Applied Psychiatry for Psychologists. One of the founders of this school was Harry Stack Sullivan whose work had a large impact on Strupp's academic career and thinking. Hans became a Full Professor at Vanderbilt University’s Department of Psychology in 1966 and was named Distinguished Professor in 1976.

== Contributions to research in psychotherapy ==
Strupp's work in the field of psychotherapy research is considered to be pioneering because he was the first to introduce the use of actual therapy session material, such as audio and videotapes from the therapy sessions, as methodologically significant tools for testing theories of psychotherapeutic change, something that was considered to be controversial up to that time. During the studies that he followed on the practise of psychotherapy these methods were widely used.

As a prolific scholar and researcher, he published 16 books and over 300 papers. He was a member of the American Psychological Association and of the American Association for the Advancement of Science. Furthermore, he has contributed to one third to the foundation of Society for Psychotherapy Research (SPR). From 1972 to 1973, he was the SPR's president.

== Contributions to psychoanalysis ==
One of his most important works was the development of Time-Limited Psychotherapy, which is described in a treatment manual called Psychotherapy in a New Key: Time-Limited Dynamic Psychotherapy (1984) co-written by Strupp and his colleague Jeffrey Binder. In Time-Limited Psychotherapy, an integration of classical and interpersonal psychoanalytic theory is attempted, with a major result of this being the emphasis on the analysis of transference even when the external conditions, such as lesser frequency and the training of the therapist, are not those of psychoanalysis proper. Furthermore, in this manual's theory, the psychological reality is not dichotomized into veridical and distorted, with transference defined as a distortion, but it is viewed as multiple and contributed to by both participants in the interaction.

== Views on efficient psychotherapy ==
Strupp, much like Carl Rogers, focused much of his attention on the therapeutic relationship between the therapist and patient and not on the techniques used. He noted that the attitude of the therapist toward the patient was the most significant ingredient for a successful psychotherapy; therapists who were supportive and empathetic were the most likely to have success. His many publications include Psychotherapy: Clinical, Research and theoretical issues (1973) and (with others) Psychotherapy for better or worse (1977).
