= Therapeutic alliance =

Freudian concept

A therapeutic alliance, or working alliance, is a partnership between a patient and their therapist that allows them to achieve goals through agreed-upon tasks.

The concept of therapeutic alliance dates back to Sigmund Freud. Over the course of its evolution, the meaning of the therapeutic alliance has shifted both in form and implication. What started as an analytic construct has become, over the years, a transtheoretical formulation, an integrative variable, and a common factor.

== Alliance as analytic ==
In its analytic permutation, Freud suggested the importance of allowing for the patient to be a “collaborator” in the therapeutic process. In his writings on transference, Freud thought of the patient’s feelings towards the therapist as resembling the non-conflicted, trusting elements of early relationships with the patient’s parents, and that this could serve as the basis for collaboration in this way.

In later years, ego psychologists popularized a construct that they would relate to the reality-oriented adaptation of the ego to the environment. For certain ego psychologists, the construct refocused psychoanalytic thought away from a perceived overemphasis on transference and allowed space for greater technical flexibility across different psychotherapeutic modalities. It also called into question the idea of therapist as a tabula rasa, or blank screen, and turned away from the idealized therapist stance of abstinence and neutrality. Instead, it brought attention to the real, felt dimension of the therapeutic relationship, and made an argument for the therapist as being supportive and the patient as identifying with the therapist.

== Alliance as integrative ==
Edward Bordin reformulated the therapeutic alliance more broadly, namely beyond the scope of the psychodynamic perspective, as transtheoretical. He operationalized the construct into three interdependent parts:

1. the affective bond between the patient and therapist;
2. their agreement on goals; and
3. their agreement on tasks.

This conceptualization preserved the earlier focus on the affective aspects of the alliance (i.e., bond), while also incorporating more cognitive dimensions as well (i.e., tasks and goals). Bordin’s work led to a desire among researchers to further develop ways to measure the alliance based on his initial operationalization. Around this time there was a surge of interest in psychotherapy integration and psychotherapy research on the alliance.

== Alliance as intersubjective ==
Jeremy Safran and J. Christopher Muran, along with their colleagues Catherine F. Eubanks and Lisa Wallner Samstag, advanced a further reformulation of the alliance. They agreed with Bordin that at an explicit level, patient and therapist collaborate on specific tasks. However, on an implicit level, they are also negotiating specific desires derived from underlying needs.

In this regard, the authors invoked the motivational needs for agency (self-definition) and communion (relatedness), and the existential need for mutual recognition (to see another’s subjectivity and to have another see one’s own as the culmination of knowing one exists), to advance an intersubjective consideration.

The authors suggested ruptures invariably occur as result of the inherent tensions in the negotiation of these dialectical needs. They distinguished between withdrawal and confrontation rupture markers, interpersonal communications or behavior by patient or therapist.

- The former includes movements away from self or other: that is, movements towards isolation or appeasement, pursuits of communion at the expense of agency.
- The latter includes movements against the other: that is, movements towards control or aggression, pursuits of agency at the expense of communion. They defined the repair of these ruptures as a critical change process.

== Alliance in psychotherapy research ==
Beginning in the 1970s, the alliance construct became a primary focus of psychotherapy research. This can be attributed largely to Bordin’s reformulation, which led to the development of Working Alliance Inventory (WAI) and Lester Luborsky’s Penn Helping Alliance Questionnaire (HAq). The Vanderbilt Psychotherapy Process Scales and the California Psychotherapy Alliance Scales (CALPAS) were other noteworthy measures.

Christoph Flückiger, AC Del Re, Bruce Wampold, and Adam Horvath conducted a meta-analysis on the alliance in psychotherapy. The researchers synthesized 295 independent studies of over 30,000 patients published 1978-2017. Results confirmed a moderate relationship between alliance and psychotherapy outcome.

In addition, Eubanks, Muran, and Safran conducted two meta-analyses on rupture repair in the alliance. The first indicated a moderate relationship between rupture repair and outcome. The second examined the effect of an alliance-focused training on rupture repair. Results suggested some support for the effect of such training.
