= Nancy McWilliams =

American psychologist

Nancy McWilliams Ph.D., ABPP.
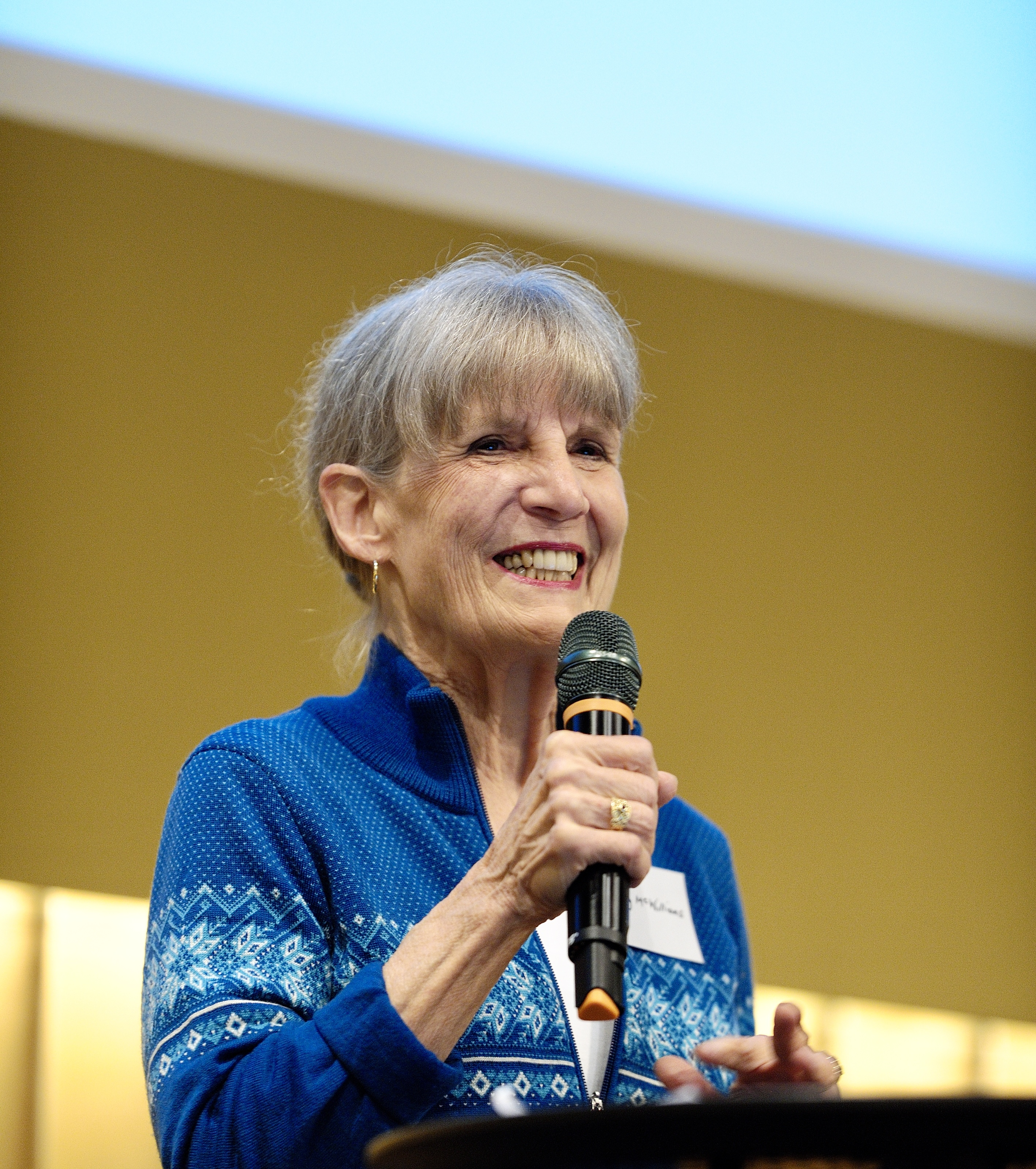
- Born: 1945 (age 80–81)
- Notable work: Psychodynamic Diagnostic Manual; Psychoanalytic Diagnosis
- Scientific career
- Education: Oberlin College, Brooklyn College, Rutgers University
- Fields: Psychoanalysis, Psychotherapy, Personality
- Workplaces: Rutgers University
- Website: https://nancymcwilliams.com

Nancy McWilliams is an American psychologist who is emerita visiting professor at the Graduate School of Applied and Professional Psychology at Rutgers University. She has written on personality and psychotherapy.

McWilliams is a psychoanalytic/dynamic author, teacher, supervisor, and therapist. She has a private practice in psychotherapy and supervision in Lambertville, New Jersey. She is a former president of the Division of Psychoanalysis (39) of the American Psychological Association (APA).

== Biography ==
Born in 1945 in Abington, Pennsylvania, she grew up in Longmeadow, Massachusetts, New Canaan, Connecticut, and Wyomissing, Pennsylvania. She graduated from Oberlin College in 1967, with honors in Political Science. Subsequently, she studied psychology at Brooklyn College and then received her Master's and Doctoral degrees from Rutgers University in Psychology (Personality and Social). In 1978 she was licensed as an independent psychologist in New Jersey and also graduated from the National Psychological Association for Psychoanalysis in New York. Since 2010, she has been Board Certified in Psychoanalysis in Psychology.

In 2011, the American Psychological Association chose her to represent psychoanalytic therapy in the remake of the classic film, Three Approaches to Psychotherapy. In 2015, she was asked to be the plenary speaker at the American Psychological Association convention in Toronto, Canada. She is a member of the Center for Psychotherapy and Psychoanalysis of New Jersey and an Honorary Member of the American Psychoanalytic Association, the Moscow Psychoanalytic Society, the Institute for Psychoanalytic Therapy in Turin, Italy, and the Warsaw Scientific Association for Psychodynamic Psychotherapy. She has given graduation addresses at the Smith College School for Social Work and the Yale University School of Medicine. In the summer of 2016 she was the Erikson Scholar at the Austen Riggs Center in Stockbridge, Massachusetts. In 2016, she taught a course on "The Minister and Mental Health" at Princeton Theological Seminary. Her writings have been translated into 20 languages, and she has taught in 30 countries.

Her areas of specialty include psychoanalytic theories, individual differences, personality, the relationship between psychological diagnosis and treatment, alternatives to DSM diagnostic conventions, integration of feminist theory and psychoanalytic knowledge, and the application of psychoanalytic understanding to the problems of diverse clinical populations.

== Psychoanalytic Diagnosis ==
McWilliams' 1994 book Psychoanalytic Diagnosis, published in a second edition in 2011, is considered by psychoanalysts and psychodynamic psychotherapists to be a classic text on the diagnosis of patients within these theoretical frameworks. It was described by Otto F. Kernberg as serving an "essential function" in educating about a psychoanalytic understanding of personality and personality disorders.

The book criticizes the approach to diagnosis widely adopted in the United States following the publication of the DSM-III in 1980, and instead attempts to develop an alternative approach that mixes elements of classical drive theory, object relations theory, ego psychology, neurobiology, attachment theory, and modern psychodynamic theory in general, often taking a relational perspective. It relates these theoretical considerations to their implications for the practice of psychotherapy.

In contrast to the Psychodynamic Diagnostic Manual, Psychoanalytic Diagnosis is focused chiefly on personality, and in particular personality disorders. While the book takes an eclectic approach, it does propose a specific diagnostic framework containing nine distinct "types of character organization", namely:

1. psychopathic personalities, which correspond to antisocial personality disorder in the DSM;
2. narcissistic personalities, which correspond to narcissistic personality disorder;
3. schizoid personalities, which encompass schizoid personality disorder, schizotypal personality disorder and avoidant personality disorder, and relates to schizotypy and the schizophrenia spectrum in general;
4. paranoid personalities, which correspond to paranoid personality disorder;
5. depressive and manic personalities, which relate to various DSM diagnoses, including the former depressive personality disorder;
6. masochistic or self-defeating personalities, which correspond to the unrecognized self-defeating personality disorder;
7. obsessive and compulsive personalities, which correspond to obsessive–compulsive personality disorder;
8. hysterical or histrionic personalities, which correspond to histrionic personality disorder and borderline personality disorder; and
9. dissociative psychologies, which relate to various psychological phenomena, including derealization, depersonalization, the associated depersonalization–derealization disorder, and in extreme cases, dissociative identity disorder.

These personalities are described in terms of their underlying defense mechanisms, of which the book outlines ten "primary defensive processes" and another fifteen "secondary defensive processes".

Additionally, the book identifies a spectrum of developmental levels of organization, which is partitioned into three sections, namely the neurotic, borderline and psychotic ranges of functioning. Here, "borderline" is used in the sense of Otto Kernberg's borderline personality organization (BPO), which is distinct from what is now usually called borderline personality disorder (BPD).

== Publications ==
McWilliams is the author of several books on psychoanalysis, personality and psychotherapy:

- —— (2011). Psychoanalytic Diagnosis (2nd ed.). Guilford Press. ISBN 9781609184940. First edition published in 1994.
- —— (1999). Psychoanalytic Case Formulation. Guilford Press. ISBN 9781572304628.
- —— (2004). Psychoanalytic Psychotherapy: A Practitioner's Guide. Guilford Press. ISBN 9781593850098.
- —— (2021). Psychoanalytic Supervision. Guilford Press. ISBN 9781462547999.

She is also Associate Editor of the Psychodynamic Diagnostic Manual, first published in 2006, and published in a second edition (PDM-2) in 2017 and recently a third edition in 2025.

- Lingiardi, Vittorio; ——, eds. (2017). Psychodynamic Diagnostic Manual (PDM-2) (2nd ed.). Guilford Press. ISBN 9781462530540.

== Awards ==
Awards include the Gradiva Prize for her second and fourth books, the Rosalee Weiss award for contributions to practice, the Division of Psychoanalysis awards for leadership (2005), scholarship (2012), and international academic excellence (2021), the Laughlin distinguished teacher award, the Goethe Scholarship award, and the Hans Strupp award for teaching, practice and writing.
