= Society for Psychotherapy Research =

International learned society

- Formation: 1970
- Website: www.psychotherapyresearch.org

The Society for Psychotherapy Research (SPR) is a learned society founded in 1970. It is multidisciplinary, international association for research into psychotherapy. The idea of an international society of psychotherapists was discussed at an annual meeting of the American Psychological Association in 1968.

The society has chapters in the United Kingdom, the rest of Europe, Latin America, and North America. The Society for Psychotherapy Research also has what it describes as "Area groups" in Australia, Italy, and other specific locations.

The academic journal of the Society for Psychotherapy Research, Psychotherapy Research, is published bi-monthly by Routledge.

== Aims and history ==
SPR encourages the development of research on psychotherapy as well as aims to support and enhance both the empirical basis and applied value of research on psychotherapy. Psychotherapy research is stimulated, for instance, by providing small research grants for pilot studies which, in turn, enable researchers to later obtain larger grant funding. The society also plays an important role in providing opportunities to psychotherapy researchers for interaction and dialogue by organizing regular meetings to enable communication about research, share methodological innovations, and disseminate research findings and knowledge of their applications. It makes use of print and electronic media to disseminate the results of psychotherapy research and to share ideas related to research methods.

The creation of a Society for Psychotherapy Research goes back to a meeting of psychotherapy researchers in San Francisco in 1968, which was associated to the annual meeting of the American Psychological Association. This meeting was sponsored by small donations of the APA Division of Psychotherapy and the American Academy of Psychotherapists. The founders of the group were Kenneth I. Howard and David Orlinsky, with support from Lester Luborsky, Nathaniel Raskin, and Hans Herrman Strupp. The first official conference took place in Highland Park, Illinois in 1969.

== Organization ==
As of December 2017, the society consists of four regional chapters, two area groups, and five interest sections. The regional chapters are:

- Europe
- Latin America
- North America
- United Kingdom

In some areas, there are many active SPR members and local meetings are organized. The area groups are:

- Australia
- Italy

In addition to the chapters and area groups, there are sections on specific topics that are of interest to members. As of December 2017, there are five special interest sections:

- Child, adolescent, and family therapy research
- Culture and psychotherapy
- Therapist training and development
- Case study interest group
- Complexity science in psychotherapy

== Members ==
The society has approximately 1,100 members worldwide. Membership includes a free subscription to Psychotherapy Research.

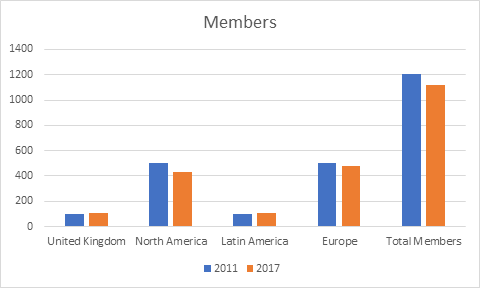
Total SPR members in 2011 and 2017

== Annual meetings ==
The international annual meetings take place at the end of June and have been organized since 1970. All scientific programs of the meetings are available online, back to the year 1972.

=== List of international annual meetings ===
- 2026: 57th International Annual Meeting, Osaka, Japan (upcoming)
- 2025: 56th International Annual Meeting, Kraków, Poland
- 2024: 55th International Annual Meeting, Ottawa, Canada
- 2023: 54th International Annual Meeting, Dublin, Ireland
- 2022: 53rd International Annual Meeting, Denver, CO, USA
- 2021: 52nd International Annual Meeting, Heidelberg, Germany
- 2020: 51st International Annual Meeting, Amherst, MA, USA
- 2019: 50th International Annual Meeting, Buenos Aires, Argentina
- 2018: 49th International Annual Meeting, Amsterdam, the Netherlands
- 2017: 48th International Annual Meeting, Toronto, Canada
- 2016: 47th International Annual Meeting, Jerusalem, Israel
- 2015: 46th International Annual Meeting, Philadelphia, USA
- 2014: 45th International Annual Meeting, Copenhagen, Denmark
- 2013: 44th International Annual Meeting, Brisbane, Australia
- 2012: 43rd International Annual Meeting, Virginia Beach, USA
- 2011: 42nd International Annual Meeting, Bern, Switzerland
- 2010: 41st International Annual Meeting, Asilomar, CA, USA
- 2009: 40th International Annual Meeting, Santiago de Chile
- 2008: 39th International Annual Meeting, Barcelona, Spain
- 2007: 38th International Annual Meeting, Madison, WI, USA
- 2006: 37th International Annual Meeting, Edinburgh, Scotland
- 2005: 36th International Annual Meeting, Montreal, Canada
- 2004: 35th International Annual Meeting, Rome, Italy
- 2003: 34th International Annual Meeting, Weimar, Germany
- 2002: 33th International Annual Meeting, Santa Barbara, CA, USA
- 2001: 32nd International Annual Meeting, Montevideo, Uruguay
- 2000: 31st International Annual Meeting, Blumingdale, IL, USA

== Presidents ==
The past presidents of the SPR have been:

| 1970–79 | 1980–89 | 1990–99 | 2000–09 | 2010–19 |
|---|---|---|---|---|
| 1970 Kenneth I. Howard | 1980 Mardi J. Horowitz | 1990 Horst Kächele | 2000 Robert Elliott | 2010 Lynne Angus |
| 1971 David E. Orlinsky | 1981 Stanley D. Imber | 1991 Lorna Smith Benjamin | 2001 Franz Caspar | 2011 Guillermo de la Parra |
| 1972 Hans Herrman Strupp | 1982 Alan S. Gurman | 1992 Leonard M. Horowitz | 2002 Karla Moras | 2012 George Silberschatz |
| 1973 Lester Luborsky | 1983 Arthur H. Auerbach | 1993 David A. Shapiro | 2003 Mark Aveline | 2013 Hadas Wieseman |
| 1974 Allen E. Bergin | 1984 A. John Rush | 1994 Clara E. Hill | 2004 John Clarkin | 2014 Jeanne Watson |
| 1975 Sol L. Garfield | 1985 Jim Mintz | 1995 Klaus Grawe | 2005 Michael J. Lambert | 2015 J. Christopher Perry |
| 1976 Aaron T. Beck | 1986 Larry E. Beutler | 1996 Paul Crits–Christoph | 2006 Erhard Mergenthaler | 2016 J. Christopher Muran |
| 1977 Morris B. Parloff | 1987 Larry E. Beutler | 1997 William B. Stiles | 2007 Jacques Barber | 2017 Paulo P. Machado |
| 1978 Irene Elkin | 1988 Charles R. Marmar | 1998 Marvin R. Goldfried | 2008 Bernhard Strauß | 2018 Mariane Krause |
| 1979 Edward S. Bordin | 1989 Leslie S. Greenberg | 1999 William E. Piper | 2009 Louis G. Castonguay | 2019 Bruce Wampold |
| 2020 - | | | | |
| 2020 Martin grosse Hothford | | | | |
| 2021 Shelley McMain | | | | |
| 2022 Wolfgang Lutz | | | | |
| 2023 Andres Roussos | | | | |
2024 Shigeru Iwakawe
