= Klaus Grawe =

Klaus Grawe (29 April 1943 – 10 July 2005) was a German psychotherapeutic researcher.

Grawe grew up in Hamburg and graduated there in psychology in 1968. He worked at the psychiatric clinic in Hamburg-Eppendorf between 1969 and 1979 and was awarded a PhD in 1976 from the University of Hamburg. He received his habilitation in Hamburg in 1979 and was offered a Professorship at the University of Bern, Switzerland. He later moved to Zurich. In 1995/1996 he was President of the Society for Psychotherapy Research.

His best known and most referenced works are Process and Outcome in Psychological Therapy, Psychological Therapy, and Neuropsychotherapy. His 1994 meta-analysis on the outcomes of psychotherapy studies was the most comprehensive and ambitious in Germany, and triggered a heated debate in academic circles as well as in the wider community about the efficacy and effectiveness of various approaches and psychotherapy in general. In his scientific studies, Grawe asked fundamental questions such as: How does the therapeutic process develop? Which ingredients make a good psychotherapy beyond the limits of schools of psychotherapy? How can we best train psychotherapists for their demanding tasks? His later contributions focused on the integration of the new emerging fields of neurobiology and the brain sciences with clinical psychology and psychotherapy, becoming a father figure to contemporary neuropsychotherapy.
