= Buddhism and psychology =

Buddhism, Mindfulness and Psychology

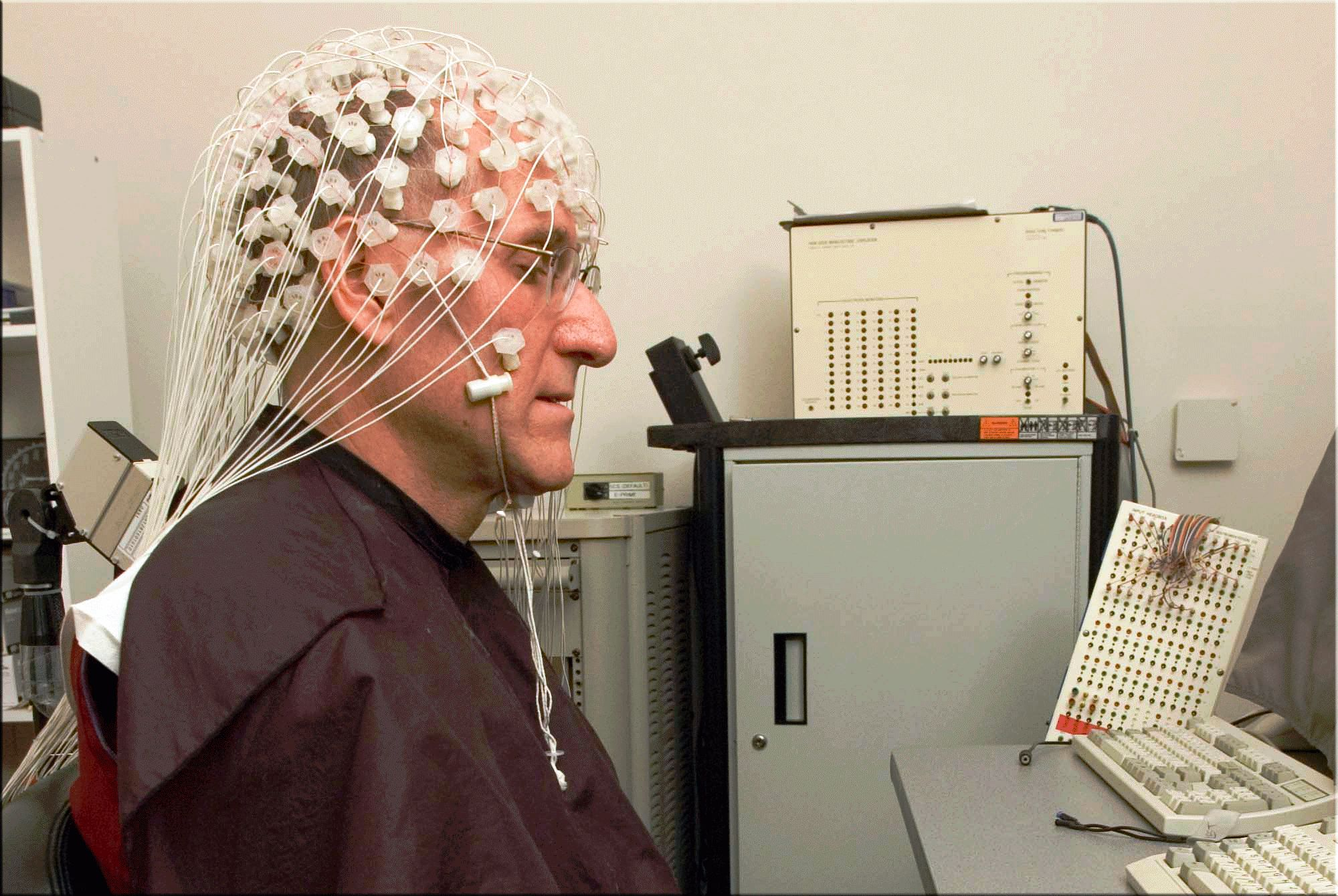
Buddhist monk Barry Kerzin participating in neuropsychology meditation research with EEG

Buddhism includes an analysis of human psychology, emotion, cognition, behavior and motivation along with therapeutic practices. Buddhist psychology is embedded within the greater Buddhist ethical and philosophical system, and its psychological terminology is colored by ethical overtones. Buddhist psychology has two therapeutic goals: the healthy and virtuous life of a householder (samacariya, "harmonious living") and the ultimate goal of nirvana, the total cessation of dissatisfaction and suffering (dukkha).

Buddhism and the modern discipline of psychology have multiple parallels and points of overlap. This includes a descriptive phenomenology of mental states, emotions and behaviors as well as theories of perception and unconscious mental factors. Psychotherapists such as Erich Fromm have found in Buddhist enlightenment experiences (e.g. kensho) the potential for transformation, healing and finding existential meaning. Some contemporary mental-health practitioners such as Jon Kabat-Zinn find ancient Buddhist practices (such as the development of mindfulness) of empirically therapeutic value, while Buddhist teachers such as Jack Kornfield see Western psychology as providing complementary practices for Buddhists.

== Interaction ==
Buddhism predates the field of psychology by over two millennia; thus, any assessment of Buddhism in terms of psychology is necessarily a modern invention. (Note: Buddhist doctrine was first articulated by the Buddha (traditionally ca. 563 BCE to ca. 483 BCE; historically probably ca. 480 BCE to ca. 400 BCE [cf. Bechert, 2004]). The establishment of a self-conscious field of psychology as the empirical assessment of human mental activities and behavior is often identified with the work of Wilhelm Wundt (August 16, 1832 – August 31, 1920).) The modern growth of Buddhism in the West and particularly the development of Buddhist modernism worldwide has led to the comparing and contrasting of European psychology and psychiatry with Buddhist theory and practice. According to Austrian psychologist Gerald Virtbauer, the contact of Buddhism and European Psychology has generally followed three main approaches:

1. The presentation and exploration of parts of Buddhist teachings as a Psychology and psychological method for analyzing and modifying human experience.
2. The integration of parts of the Buddhist teachings in already existing psychological or psychotherapeutic lines of thought (such as in mindfulness-based cognitive therapy and in acceptance and commitment therapy).
3. Buddhist integration of Western psychological and social science knowledge into the Buddhist system (e.g., Buddhist modernism, Vipassana movement)

== Psychology in the Tipitaka ==
Early Buddhist writings are preserved in three-part collections called Tipitaka (Pali; Skt. Tripitaka). The first part, the Sutta Pitaka contains a series of discourses attributed to the Buddha containing much psychological material.

A central feature of Buddhist psychology is its methodology which is based on personal experience through introspection and phenomenological self-observation. According to the Buddha, one's initially unreliable mind can be trained, calmed and cultivated to make introspection a refined and reliable method. This methodology is the foundation for the personal insight into the nature of the mind the Buddha is said to have achieved. While introspection is a key aspect of the Buddhist method, observation of a person's behavior is also important.

=== Perception and the self ===
Figure 1: The Pali Canon's Six Sextets:

sense bases (āyatana)

→

feeling ︵vedanā︶

→

craving ︵taṇhā︶

"internal"
sense
organs
<–>
"external"
sense
objects

↓
↓
↓
contact (phassa)
↓
↑

consciousness (viññāṇa)

1. The six internal sense bases are the eye, ear,
  nose, tongue, body & mind.
2. The six external sense bases are visible forms,
  sound, odor, flavors, touch & mental objects.
3. Sense-specific consciousness arises dependent
  on an internal & an external sense base.
4. Contact is the meeting of an internal sense
  base, external sense base & consciousness.
5. Feeling is dependent on contact.
6. Craving is dependent on feeling.
Source: MN 148 (Thanissaro, 1998) diagram details

The Five Aggregates (pañcakkhandha)
according to the Pali Canon.

form (rūpa)
| 4 elements (mahābhūta) |
| | ↓ |
| | contact (phassa) |
| ↓ | ↑ |
consciousness (viññāna)

→
←

←

| mental factors (cetasika) |
feeling (vedanā)
perception (sañña)
formation (saṅkhāra)

- Form is derived from the Four Great Elements.
- Consciousness arises from other aggregates.
- Mental Factors arise from the Contact of
  Consciousness and other aggregates.
- The five aggregates are no-self.

Source: MN 109 (Thanissaro, 2001) | diagram details

The early Buddhist texts outline a theory of perception and cognition based on the ayatanas (sense bases, sense media, sense spheres) which are categorized into sense organs, sense objects and awareness. The contact between these bases leads to a perceptual event as explained in Buddhist texts: "when the eye that is internal is intact and external visible forms come within its range and when there is an appropriate act of attention on the part of the mind, there is the emergence of perceptual consciousness."

The usual process of sense cognition is entangled with what the Buddha terms "papañca" (conceptual proliferation), a distortion and elaboration in the cognitive process of the raw sensation or feeling (vedana). This process of confabulation feeds back into the perceptual process itself. Therefore, perception for the Buddhists is based on senses, desires, interests and concepts and is therefore unrealistic and misleading. The goal of Buddhist practice is to remove these distractions and gain knowledge of things as they are (yatha-bhuta ñānadassanam).

This psycho-physical process is further linked with psychological craving, manas (conceit) and ditthi (dogmas, views). One of the most problematic views according to the Buddha, is the notion of a permanent and solid Self or 'pure ego'. This is because in early Buddhist psychology, there is no fixed self (atta; Sanskrit atman) but the delusion of self and clinging to a self concept affects all one's behaviors and leads to suffering. For the Buddha there is nothing uniform or substantial about a person, only a constantly changing stream of events or processes categorized under five categories called skandhas (heaps, aggregates), which includes the stream of consciousness (Vijñāna-sotam). False belief and attachment to an abiding ego-entity is at the root of most negative emotions.

The psychologist Daniel Goleman states:

The notion of an "empty self" posits that there is no "CEO of the mind," but rather something like committees constantly vying for power. In this view, the "self" is not a stable, enduring entity in control, but rather a mirage of the mind—not actually real, but merely seemingly so. While that notion seems contrary to our own everyday experience, it actually describes the deconstruction of self that cognitive neuroscience finds as it dissects the mind (most famously, Marvin Minsky's "society of mind"). So the Buddhist model of the self may turn out to fit the data far better than the notions that have dominated Psychological thinking for the last century.

The Buddha saw the human mind as a psycho-physical complex, a dynamic continuum called namarupa (mental and physical components). According to Padmasiri de Silva, "The mental and physical constituents form one complex, and there is a mutual dependency of the mind on the body and of the body on the mind."

=== Motivation and emotion ===
Buddha's theory of human motivation is based on certain key factors shared by all human beings and is primarily concerned with the nature of human dissatisfaction (dukkha) and how to dispel it. In the suttas, human beings are said to be motivated by craving (tanha, literally 'thirst') of three types:

- Kama tanha - craving for sensory gratification, sex, novel stimuli, and pleasure.
- Bhava tanha - craving for survival or continued existence, also includes hunger and sleep as well as desire for power, wealth and fame.
- Vibhava tanha - craving for annihilation, non-existence, also associated with aggression and violence towards oneself and others

These three basic drives have been compared to the Freudian drive theory of libido, ego, and thanatos respectively (de Silva, 1973). The arousal of these three cravings is derived from pleasant or unpleasant feelings (vedana), reactions to sense impressions with positive or negative hedonic tone. Cravings condition clinging or obsession (upadana) to sense impressions, leading to a vicious cycle of further craving and striving, which is ultimately unsatisfactory and stressful.

The suttas also enumerate three "unwholesome roots" (akusala mulas) of suffering, negative emotions and behavior: raga (passion or lust); dosa (hatred or malice); and moha (delusion, or false belief). These are opposed by three wholesome roots: liberality, kindness and wisdom.

Feeling or affective reaction (vedana) is at the source of the emotions and it is categorized in various ways; as physical or mental, as pleasant, unpleasant or neutral; and as rooted in the different senses. The Buddha makes a distinction between worldly and unworldly or spiritual feelings, seeing spiritual feelings as superior. Out of these basic immediate reactions as well as our situational context, conceptualization and personal history arise more complex emotions, such as fear, hatred, hope or despair. The Buddhist theory of emotion highlights the ethical and spiritual importance of positive emotions such as compassion and friendliness as antidotes for negative emotions and as vehicles for self development.

According to Padmasiri de Silva, in the early Buddhist texts emotions can be divided into four groups: "those which obstruct the ideal of the virtuous life sought by the layman, emotions that interfere with the recluse seeking the path of perfection, emotions enhancing the layman's ideal of the virtuous life and emotions developed by the recluse seeking the path of perfection."

=== The Unconscious ===
The early Buddhist texts such as the Pali Canon present a theory about latent mental tendencies (Anusaya, "latent bias", "predisposition", "latent disposition") which are pre-conscious or non-conscious These habitual patterns are later termed "Vāsanā" (impression) by the later Yogacara Buddhists and were held to reside in an unconscious mental layer. The term "fetter" is also associated with the latent tendencies.

A later Theravada text, the Abhidhammattha-sangaha (8th-12th century) says: "The latent dispositions are defilements which 'lie along with' the mental process to which they belong, rising to the surface as obsessions whenever they meet with suitable conditions" (Abhs 7.9). The Theravada school holds that there is a subconscious stream of awareness, called the Bhavanga.

Another set of unconscious mental factors responsible for influencing one's behavior include the asavas (Sanskrit asrava, "influx, canker, inflows"). These factors are said to "intoxicate" and "befuddle" the mind. The Buddha taught that one had to remove them from the mind through practice in order to reach liberation. The asavas are said to arise from different factors: sensuality, aggression, cruelty, body, and individuality are some of the factors given.

The Yogacara school of Mahayana Buddhism (starting from the 3rd to 5th century CE) extended these ideas into what has been called a Buddhist theory of the Unconscious mind. This concept was termed the ālaya-vijñāna (the foundation consciousness) which stores karmic seeds (bija) and undergoes rebirth. This theory was incorporated into a wider Yogacara theory of the Eight Consciousnesses and is also held in Tibetan Buddhism.

=== Self development and cognitive behavioral practices ===
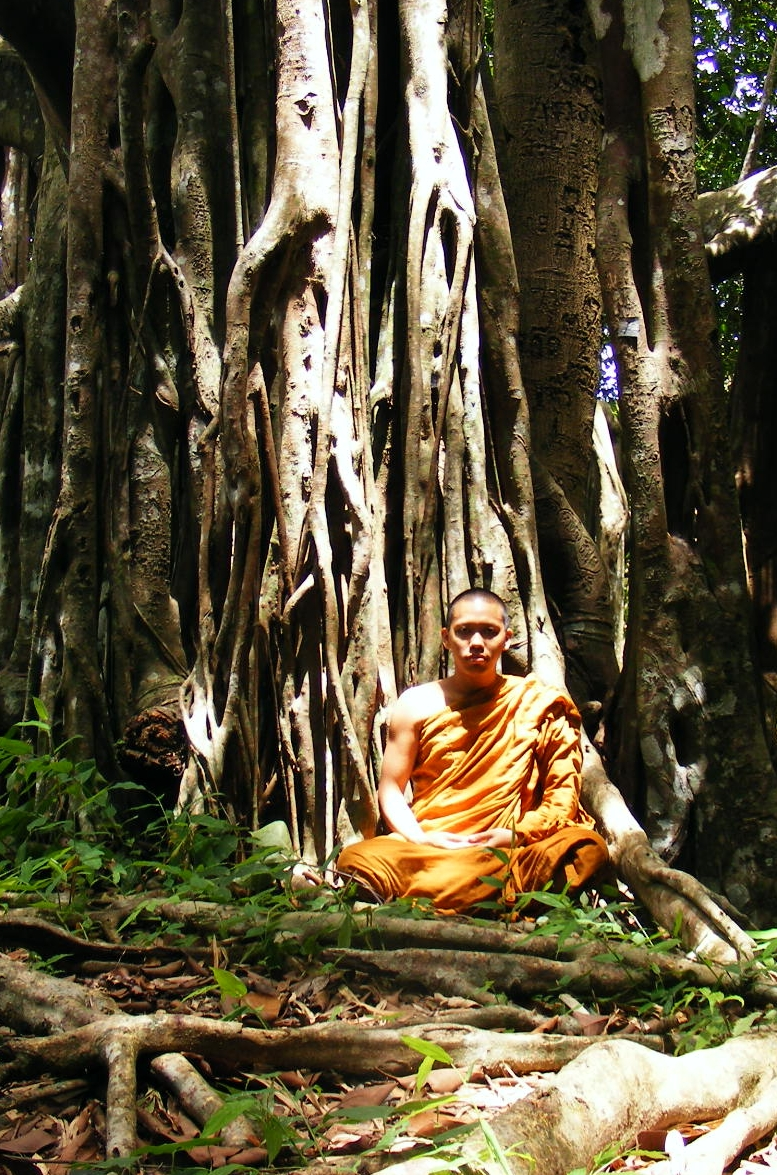
Meditating Buddhist monk in Khao Luang.

According to Padmal de Silva "Buddhist strategies represent a therapeutic model which treats the person as his/her agent of change, rather than as the recipient of externally imposed interventions." Silva argues that the Buddha saw each person responsible for their own personal development and considers this as being similar to the humanistic approach to psychology. Humanistic psychotherapy places much emphasis on helping the client achieve self-actualization and personal growth (e.g. Maslow).

Personal development in Buddhism is based upon the Noble Eightfold Path which integrates ethics, wisdom or understanding (pañña) and practices such as meditation (bhavana, cultivation, development). Self-actualization in traditional Buddhism is based on the ideas of Nirvana and Buddhahood. The highest state a human can achieve (an Arahant or a Buddha) is seen as being completely free from any kind of dissatisfaction or suffering, all negative mental tendencies, roots and influxes have been eliminated and there are only positive emotions like compassion and loving-kindness present.

Buddhist meditation is of two main types: Samatha is meant to calm and relax the mind, as well as develop focus and concentration by training attention on a single object; Vipassana is a means to gain insight or understanding into the nature of the mental processes and their impermanent, stressful and self-less qualities through the application of continuous and stable mindfulness and comprehension (Sampajañña). Though the ultimate goal of these practices are nirvana, the Buddha stated that they also bring mundane benefits such as relaxation, good sleep and pain reduction.

Buddhist texts contain mental strategies of thought modification which are similar to cognitive behavioral therapy techniques. A comparison of these systems of cognitive behavioral modification has been discussed by professor William Mikulas and Padmal de Silva.

According to Padmal de Silva these similarities include: "fear reduction by graded exposure and reciprocal inhibition; using rewards for promoting desirable behavior; modelling for inducing behavioral change; the use of stimulus control to eliminate undesirable behavior; the use of aversion to eliminate undesirable behavior; training in social skills; self-monitoring; control of intrusive thoughts by distraction, switching/stopping, incompatible thoughts, and by prolonged exposure to them; intense, covert, focusing on the unpleasant aspects of a stimulus or the unpleasant consequences of a response, to reduce attachment to the former and eliminate the latter; graded approach to the development of positive feelings towards others: use of external cues in behavior control; use of response cost to aid elimination of undesirable behavior; use of family members for carrying out behavior change programs; and cognitive-behavioral methods—for example, for grief."

An important early text for these cognitive therapeutic methods is the Vitakkasanthana Sutta (MN 20) (The Removal of Distracting Thoughts) and its commentary, the Papancasudani. For removing negative or intrusive thoughts, the Buddha recommended five methods in this sutta:

1. Focus on an opposite or incompatible thought or object.
2. Ponder on the perils and disadvantages of the thought, its harmful consequences.
3. Ignore the thought and distract yourself from it through some other activity.
4. Reflect on the removal or stopping of the causes of the target thought.
5. Make a forceful mental effort.

Another recommended technique is from the Satipatthana Sutta, which outlines the practice of mindfulness, which is not just a formal meditation, but a skill of attentive awareness and self-monitoring. In developing mindfulness, one is advised to be aware of all thoughts and sensations that arise, even unwanted or unpleasant ones and continuously attend to such thoughts. Eventually, through habituation and exposure, the intensity and unpleasantness of such thoughts will disappear. Buddhist texts also promote the training of positive emotions such as loving-kindness, compassion, empathetic joy and equanimity.

=== Abnormal psychology ===
The Pali Canon records that the Buddha distinguished between two kinds of illness: physical illness (kāyiko rogo) and mental illness (cetasiko rogo). The Buddha attributed mental illness to the arising of mental defilements (Kleshas) which are ultimately based on the unwholesome roots (three poisons) of greed, hatred and confusion. From the perspective of the Buddha, mental illness is a matter of degree, and ultimately, everyone who is not an awakened being is in some sense mentally ill. As the Buddha in the Pali canon states: "those beings are hard to find in the world who can admit freedom from mental disease even for one moment, save only those in whom the asavas are destroyed." Another set of negative qualities outlined by the Buddha are the five hindrances, which are said to prevent proper mental cultivation, these are: sense desire, hostility, sloth-torpor, restlessness-worry and doubt.

According to Edwina Pio, Buddhist texts see mental illness as being mainly psychogenic in nature (rooted mainly in "environmental stress and inappropriate learning").

The Pali canon describes Buddhist monks (epitomized by the monk Gagga) with symptoms of what would today be called mental illness. An act which is against the monk's code of discipline (Vinaya) committed by someone who was "ummatta" - "out of his mind" was said by the Buddha to be pardonable. This was termed the "madman's leave" (ummattakasammuti) The texts assume that this 'madness' can be cured or recovered from, or is at least an impermanent phenomenon, after which, during confession, the monk is considered sane by the sangha once more.

There are also stories of laypeople who show abnormal behavior due to the loss of their loved ones. Other Buddhist sources such as the Milinda Panha echo the theory that madness is caused mainly by personal and environmental circumstances.

Other abnormal behaviors described by the early sources include Intellectual disability, epilepsy, alcoholism, and suicide. Buddhagosa posits that the cause of suicide is mental illness based on factors such as loss of personal relations and physical illness.

=== Abhidhamma psychology ===
The third part (or pitaka, literally "basket") of the Tripitaka is known as the Abhidhamma (Pali; Skt. Abhidharma). The Abhidhamma works are historically later than the two other collections of the Tipitaka (3rd century BCE and later) and focus on phenomenological psychology. The Buddhist Abhidhamma works analyze the mind into elementary factors of experience called dharmas (Pali: dhammas). Dhammas are phenomenal factors or "psycho-physical events" whose interrelations and connections make up all streams of human experience. There are four categories of dharmas in the Theravada Abhidhamma: Citta (awareness), Cetasika (mental factors), Rūpa (physical occurrences, material form) and Nibbāna (cessation). Abhidhamma texts are then an attempt to list all possible factors of experience and all possible relationships between them. Among the achievements of the Abhidhamma psychologists was the outlining of a theory of emotions, a theory of personality types, and a psychology of ethical behavior.

Ven. Bhikkhu Bodhi, president of the Buddhist Publication Society, has synopsized the Abhidhamma as follows:

The system that the Abhidhamma Pitaka articulates is simultaneously a philosophy, a psychology, and an ethics, all integrated into the framework of a program for liberation ... The Abhidhamma's attempt to comprehend the nature of reality, contrary to that of classical science in the West, does not proceed from the standpoint of a neutral observer looking outwards towards the external world. The primary concern of the Abhidhamma is to understand the nature of experience, and thus the reality on which it focuses is conscious reality ... For this reason the philosophical enterprise of the Abhidhamma shades off into a phenomenological psychology. To facilitate the understanding of experienced reality, the Abhidhamma embarks upon an elaborate analysis of the mind as it presents itself to introspective meditation. It classifies consciousness into a variety of types, specifies the factors and functions of each type, correlates them with their objects and physiological bases, and shows how the different types of consciousness link up with each other and with material phenomena to constitute the ongoing process of experience.

== Buddhism and psychology ==
Buddhism and psychology overlap in theory and in practice. Since the beginning of the 20th century, four strands of interplay have evolved:

- descriptive phenomenology: scholars have found in Buddhist teachings a detailed introspective phenomenological psychology (particularly in the Abhidhamma which outlines various traits, emotions and personality types).
- psychotherapeutic meaning: humanistic psychotherapists have found in Buddhism's non-dualistic approach and enlightenment experiences (such as in Zen kensho) the potential for transformation, healing and finding existential meaning. This connection was explained by a modification of Piaget's theory of cognitive development introducing the process of initiation.
- clinical utility: some contemporary mental-health practitioners increasingly find ancient Buddhist practices (such as the development of mindfulness) of empirically proven therapeutic value.
- popular psychology and spirituality: psychology has been popularized, and has become blended with spirituality in some forms of modern spirituality. Buddhist notions form an important ingredient of this modern mix.

=== Psychology ===
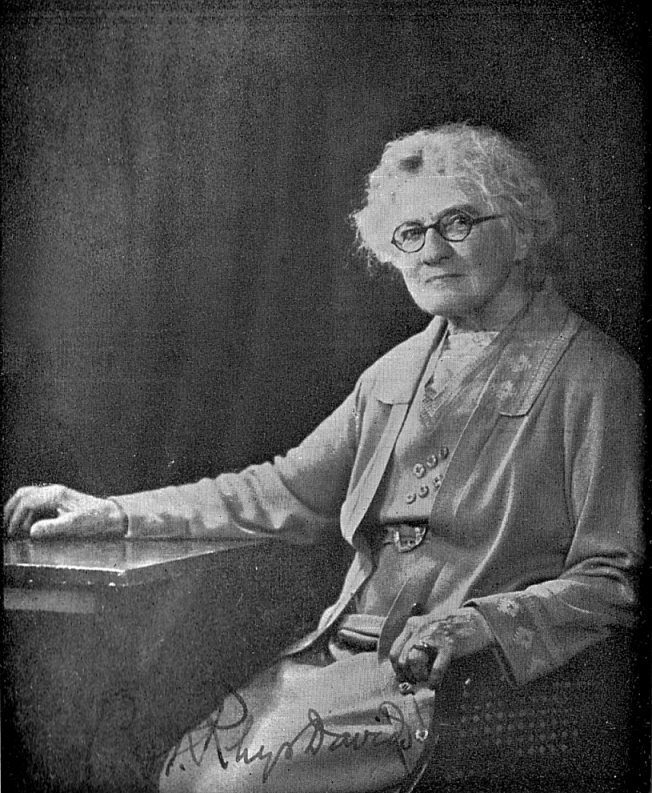
Caroline A. F. Rhys Davids was one of the first modern Psychologists to conceptualize canonical Buddhist writings in terms of psychology.

The contact between Buddhism and Psychology began with the work of the Pali Text Society scholars, whose main work was translating the Buddhist Pali Canon. In 1900, Indologist Caroline A. F. Rhys Davids published through the Pali Text Society a translation of the Theravada Abhidhamma's first book, the Dhamma Sangani, and entitled the translation, "Buddhist Manual of Psychological Ethics". In the introduction to this seminal work, Rhys Davids praised the sophistication of the Buddhist psychological system based on "a complex continuum of subjective phenomena" (dhammas) and the relationships and laws of causation that bound them (Rhys Davids, 1900, pp. xvi-xvii.). (Note: The notion that consciousness is a sequence of states, like cells in a film strip, while not explicitly contrary to notions of consciousness found in the Pali nikayas, is found explicitly in the Pali Abhidhamma (see Bodhi, 2000, p. 29).) Buddhism's psychological orientation is a theme Rhys Davids pursued for decades as evidenced by her further publications, Buddhist Psychology: An Inquiry into the Analysis and Theory of Mind in Pali Literature (1914) and The Birth of Indian Psychology and its Development in Buddhism (1936).

An important event in the interchange of East and West occurred when American psychologist William James invited the Sri Lankan Buddhist Anagarika Dharmapala to lecture in his classes at Harvard University in December 1903. After Dharmapala lectured on Buddhism, James remarked, "This is the psychology everybody will be studying 25 years from now." Later scholars such as David Kalupahana (The principles of Buddhist psychology, 1987), Padmal de Silva (Buddhism and behaviour modification, 1984), Edwina Pio and Hubert Benoit (Zen and the Psychology of Transformation, 1990) wrote about and compared Buddhism and Psychology directly. Writers in the field of transpersonal psychology (which deals with religious experience, altered states of consciousness and similar topics) such as Ken Wilber also integrated Buddhist thought and practice into their work.

The 1960s and 1970s saw the rapid growth of Western Buddhism, especially in the United States. In the 1970s, psychotherapeutic techniques using "mindfulness" were developed such as Hakomi therapy by Ron Kurtz (1934–2011), possibly the first mindfulness based therapy. Jon Kabat-Zinn's mindfulness-based stress reduction (MBSR) was a very influential development, introducing the term into Western cognitive behavioral therapy practice. Kabat-Zinn's students Zindel V. Segal, J. Mark G. Williams and John D. Teasdale later developed mindfulness-based cognitive therapy (MBCT) in 1987. In the early 2000s Vidyamala Burch and her organization Breathworks developed mindfulness-based pain management (MBPM).

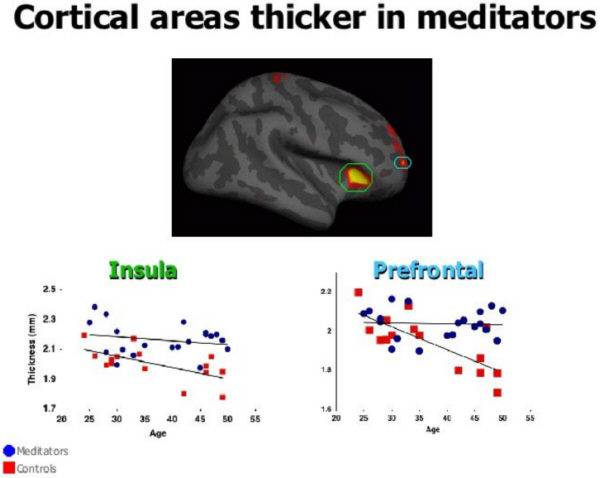
Research by Sarah Lazar et al. (2005) found brain areas that are thicker in practitioners of Insight meditation than control subjects who do not meditate.

More recent work has focused on clinical research of particular practices derived from Buddhism such as mindfulness meditation and compassion development (ex. the work of Jon Kabat-Zinn, Daniel Goleman) and on psycho-therapeutic practices which integrate meditative practices derived from Buddhism. From the perspective of Buddhism, various modern Buddhist teachers such as Jack Kornfield and Tara Brach have academic degrees in psychology.

Applying the tools of modern neuropsychology (EEG, fMRI) to study Buddhist meditation is also an area of integration. One of the first figures in this area was neurologist James H. Austin, who wrote Zen and the Brain (1998). Others who have studied and written about this type of research include Richard Davidson, B. Alan Wallace, Rick Hanson (Buddha's Brain, 2009) and Zoran Josipovic. A recent review of the literature on the Neural mechanisms of mindfulness meditation concludes that the practice "exerts beneficial effects on physical and mental health, and cognitive performance" but that "the underlying neural mechanisms remain unclear."

=== Japanese psychology ===
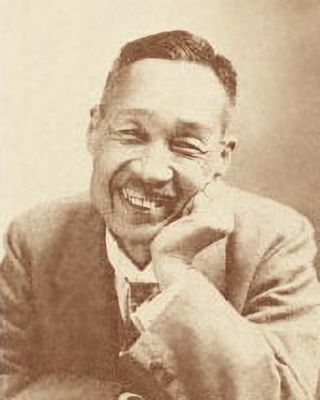
Dr. Shoma Morita (1874–1938)

In Japan, a different strand of comparative thought developed, beginning with the publication, "Psychology of Zen Sect" (1893) and "Buddhist psychology" (1897), by Inoue Enryō (1858–1919). In 1920, Tomosada Iritani (1887–1957) administered a questionnaire to 43 persons dealing with Zen practice, in what was probably the first empirical psychological study of Zen. In the field of psychotherapy, Morita therapy was developed by Shoma Morita (1874-1938) who was influenced by Zen Buddhism.

Koji Sato (1905–1971) began the publication of the journal, Psychologia: An International Journal of Psychology in the Orient in 1957 with the aim of providing a comparative psychological dialogue between East and West (with contributions from Bruner, Fromm, and Jung). In the 1960s, Kasamatsu and Hirai used Electroencephalography to monitor the brains of Zen meditators. This led to the promotion of various studies covering psychiatry, physiology, and psychology of Zen by the Japanese ministry of education which were carried out in various laboratories. Another important researcher in this field, Prof. Yoshiharu Akishige, promoted Zen Psychology, the idea that the insights of Zen should not just be studied but that they should inform psychological practice. Research in this field continues with the work of Japanese psychologists such as Akira Onda and Osamu Ando.

In Japan, a popular psychotherapy based on Buddhism is Naikan therapy, developed from Jōdo Shinshū Buddhist introspection by Ishin Yoshimoto (1916–1988). Naikan therapy is used in correctional institutions, education, to treat alcohol dependence as well as by individuals seeking self development.

=== Buddhism and psychoanalysis ===
Buddhism has some views which are comparable to psychoanalytic theory. These include a view of the unconscious mind and unconscious thought processes, the view that unwholesome unconscious forces cause much of human suffering and the idea that one may gain insight into these thought processes through various practices, including what Freud called "evenly suspended attention." A variety of teachers, clinicians and writers such as D.T. Suzuki, Carl Jung, Erich Fromm, Alan Watts, Tara Brach, Jack Kornfield and Sharon Salzberg have attempted to bridge and integrate psycho-analysis and Buddhism. British barrister Christmas Humphreys has referred to mid-twentieth century collaborations between psychoanalysts and Buddhist scholars as a meeting between: "Two of the most powerful forces operating in the Western mind today." (Note: Fromm et al., (1960), back cover. Explicitly, in regards to the book associated with the 1957 Cuernavaca, Mexico conference mentioned below, Humphries wrote: "This is the first major attempt to bring together two of the most powerful forces operating in the Western mind today.")

==== D.T. Suzuki's influence ====
One of the most important influences on the spread of Buddhism in the west was Zen scholar D.T. Suzuki. He collaborated with psycho-analysts Carl Jung, Karen Horney and Erich Fromm.

Carl Jung wrote the foreword to Suzuki's Introduction to Zen Buddhism, first published together in 1948. (Note: Both Fromm (1960) and Ellis (1962) cite this text as influential.) In his foreword, Jung highlights the enlightenment experience of satori as the "unsurpassed transformation to wholeness" for Zen practitioners. And while acknowledging the inadequacy of Psychologist attempts to comprehend satori through the lens of intellectualism, (Note: In particular, Jung quotes Rudolf Otto's stating, "Zen is neither psychology nor philosophy" (Suzuki & Jung, 1948, p. 11, n. 1).) Jung nonetheless contends that due to their shared goal of self transformation: "The only movement within our culture which partly has, and partly should have, some understanding of these aspirations [for such enlightenment] is psychotherapy."

Referencing Jung and Suzuki's collaboration as well as the efforts of others, humanistic philosopher and psychoanalyst Erich Fromm noted that: "There is an unmistakable and increasing interest in Zen Buddhism among psychoanalysts". One influential psychoanalyst who explored Zen was Karen Horney, who traveled to Japan in 1952 to meet with Suzuki and who advised her colleagues to listen to their clients with a "Zen-like concentration and non attachment". (Note: To support this statement, Fromm (1960, p. 78, n. 1) refers to Jung's foreword to Suzuki (1949), Benoit (1955), and Sato (1958). Fromm et al. (1960, p. 78) also refers to Karen Horney who "was intensely interested in Zen Buddhism during the last years of her life.")

Suzuki, Fromm and other psychoanalysts collaborated at a 1957 workshop on "Zen Buddhism and Psychoanalysis" in Cuernavaca, Mexico. (Note: Fromm et al. (1960, p. vii). Selected presentations from this conference are included in Fromm et al. (1960). Fromm's interest in Buddhism extended to multiple Buddhist schools as evidenced by his writing the foreword for Nyanaponika et al. (1986).) Fromm contends that, at the turn of the twentieth century, most psychotherapeutic patients sought treatment due to medical-like symptoms that hindered their social functioning. However, by mid-century, the majority of psychoanalytic patients lacked overt symptoms and functioned well but instead suffered from an "inner deadness" and an "alienation from oneself". Paraphrasing Suzuki broadly, Fromm continues:

Zen is the art of seeing into the nature of one's being; it is a way from bondage to freedom; it liberates our natural energies; ... and it impels us to express our faculty for happiness and love. ... What can be said with more certainty is that the knowledge of Zen, and a concern with it, can have a most fertile and clarifying influence on the theory and technique of psychoanalysis. Zen, different as it is in its method from psychoanalysis, can sharpen the focus, throw new light on the nature of insight, and heighten the sense of what it is to see, what it is to be creative, what it is to overcome the affective contaminations and false intellectualizations which are the necessary results of experience based on the subject-object split"

==== Buddhist psychoanalytic dialogue and integration ====
The dialogue between Buddhism and psychoanalysis has continued with the work of psychiatrists such as Mark Epstein, Nina Coltart, Jack Engler, Axel Hoffer, Jeremy D. Safran, David Brazier, and Jeffrey B. Rubin.

Nina Coltart (1927-1997) was the Director of the London Clinic of Psychoanalysis, a neo-Freudian and a Buddhist. She theorized that there are distinct similarities in the transformation of the self that occurs in both psychoanalysis and Buddhism. She believed that the practice of Buddhism and Psychoanalysis are "mutually reinforcing and clarifying" (Coltart, The practice of psychoanalysis and Buddhism).

Mark Epstein is an American psychiatrist who practiced Buddhism in Thailand under Ajahn Chah and has since written several books on psychoanalysis and Buddhism (Thoughts Without a Thinker 1995, Psychotherapy Without the Self, 2008). Epstein relates the Buddhist Four Noble Truths to primary narcissism as described by Donald Winnicott in his theory on the true self and false self. The first truth highlights the inevitability of humiliation in our lives of our narcissistic self-esteem. The second truth speaks of the primal thirst that makes such humiliation inevitable. The third truth promises release by developing a realistic self-image, and the fourth truth spells out the means of accomplishing that.

Jeffrey B. Rubin has also written on the integration of these two practices in Psychotherapy and Buddhism, Toward an Integration (1996). In this text, he criticizes the Buddhist idea of enlightenment as a total purification of mind: "From the psychoanalytic perspective, a static, conflict-free sphere-a psychological "safehouse" -beyond the vicissitudes of conflict and conditioning where mind is immune to various aspects of affective life such as self-interest, egocentricity, fear, lust, greed, and suffering is quixotic. Since conflict and suffering seem to be inevitable aspects of human life, the ideal of Enlightenment may be asymptotic, that is, an unreachable ideal." He points to scandals and abuses by American Buddhist teachers as examples. Rubin also outlines a case study of the psychoanalytic treatment of a Buddhist meditator and notes that meditation has been largely ignored and devalued by psychoanalysts. He argues that Buddhist meditation can provide an important contribution to the practice of psychoanalytic listening by improving an analyst's capacity for attention and recommends meditation for psychoanalysts.

Axel Hoffer has contributed to this area as editor of Freud and the Buddha, which collects several essays by psychoanalysts and a Buddhist scholar, Andrew Olendzki. Olendzki outlines an important problematic between the two systems, the Freudian practice of free association, which from the Buddhist perspective is based on: "The reflexive tendency of the mind to incessantly make a narrative of everything that arises in experience is itself the cause of much of our suffering, and meditation offers a refreshing refuge from mapping every datum of sensory input to the macro-construction of a meaningful self." Olendzki also argues that for the Buddhist, the psychoanalytic focus on linguistic narrativity distracts us from immediate experience.

==== David Brazier ====
David Brazier is a psychotherapist who combines psychotherapy and Buddhism (Zen therapy, 1995). Brazier points to various possible translations of the Pali terms of the Four Noble Truths, which give a new insight into these truths. The traditional translations of samudhaya and nirodha are "origin" and "cessation". Coupled with the translation of dukkha as "suffering", this gives rise to a causal explanation of suffering, and the impression that suffering can be totally terminated. The translation given by David Brazier gives a different interpretation to the Four Noble Truths.

1. Dukkha: existence is imperfect, it is like a wheel that is not straight into the axis;
2. Samudhaya: simultaneously with the experience of dukkha there arises tanha, thirst: the dissatisfaction with what is and the yearning that life should be different from what it is. We keep imprisoned in this yearning when we do not see reality as it is, namely imperfect and ever-changing;
3. Nirodha: we can confine this yearning (that reality is different from what it is), and perceive reality as it is, whereby our suffering from the imperfectness becomes confined;
4. Marga: this confinement is possible by following the Eightfold Path.

In this translation, samudhaya means that the uneasiness that is inherent to life arises together with the craving that life's event would be different. The translation of nirodha as confinement means that this craving is a natural reaction, which cannot be totally escaped or ceased, but can be limited, which gives us freedom.

=== Gestalt therapy ===
Gestalt Therapy, an approach created by Fritz Perls, was based on phenomenology, existentialism and also Zen Buddhism and Taoism. Perls spent some time in Japanese Zen monasteries and his therapeutic techniques include mindfulness practices and focusing on the present moment. Practices outlined by Perls himself in Ego, Hunger and Aggression (1947/1969), such as "concentration on eating" ("we have to be fully aware of the fact that we are eating") and "awareness continuum" are strikingly similar to Buddhist mindfulness training. Other authors in Gestalt Therapy who were influenced by Buddhism are Barry Stevens (therapist) and Dick Price (who developed Gestalt Practice by including Buddhist meditation).

According to Crocker, an important Buddhist element of Gestalt is that a "person is simply allowing what-is in the present moment to reveal itself to him and out of that receptivity is responding with 'no-mind'".

More recently, Claudio Naranjo has written about the practice of Gestalt and Tibetan Buddhism.

=== Existential and Humanistic psychology ===
Both existential and humanistic models of human psychology stress the importance of personal responsibility and freedom of choice, ideas which are central to Buddhist ethics and psychology.

Humanistic psychology's focus on developing the 'fully functioning person' (Carl Rogers) and self actualization (Maslow) is similar to the Buddhist attitude of self development as an ultimate human end. The idea of person-centered therapy can also be compared to the Buddhist view that the individual is ultimately responsible for their own development, that a Buddhist teacher is just a guide and that the patient can be "a light unto themselves".

Carl Rogers's idea of "unconditional positive regard" and his stress on the importance of empathy has been compared to Buddhist conceptions of compassion (Karuṇā).

Mindfulness meditation has been seen as a way to aid the practice of person centered psychotherapy. Person centered therapist Manu Buzzano has written that "It seemed clear that regular meditation practice did help me in offering congruence, empathy and unconditional positive regard." He subsequently interviewed other person centered therapists who practiced meditation and found that it enhanced their empathy, nonjudgmental openness and quality of the relationship with their clients.

A comparison has also been made between Marshall Rosenberg's Nonviolent Communication and Buddhist ideals of right speech, both in theory and in manifesting Buddhist ideals in practice.

Padmasiri de Silva sees the focus of existential psychology on the "tragic sense of life" just a different expression of the Buddhist concept of dukkha. The existential concept of anxiety or angst as a response to the human condition also resonates with the Buddhist analysis of fear and despair. The Buddhist monk Nanavira Thera in the preface to his "Notes on Dhamma" wrote that the work of the existential philosophers offered a way to approach the Buddhist texts, as they ask the type of questions about feelings of anxiety and the nature of existence with which the Buddha begins his analysis. Nanavira also states that those who have understood the Buddha's message have gone beyond the existentialists and no longer see their questions as valid. Edward Conze likewise sees the parallel between the Buddhists and Existentialists only preliminary: "In terms of the Four Truths, the existentialists have only the first, which teaches that everything is ill. Of the second, which assigns the origin of ill to craving, they have only a very imperfect grasp. As for the third and fourth, they are quite unheard of... Knowing no way out, they are manufacturers of their own woes."

=== Positive psychology ===
The growing field of positive psychology shares with Buddhism a focus on developing a positive emotions and personal strengths and virtues with the goal of improving human well-being. Positive psychology also describes the futility of the "hedonic treadmill", the chasing of ephemeral pleasures and gains in search of lasting happiness. Buddhism holds that this very same striving is at the very root of human unhappiness.

The Buddhist concept and practice of mindfulness meditation has been adopted by psychologists such as Rick Hanson (Buddha's Brain, 2009), T.B. Kashdan & J. Ciarrochi (Mindfulness, acceptance, and positive psychology, 2013) and Itai Ivtzan (Mindfulness in Positive Psychology, 2016). Kirk W. Brown and Richard M. Ryan of the University of Pennsylvania have developed a 15-item "Mindful attention awareness scale" to measure dispositional mindfulness.

The concept of Flow studied by Mihaly Csikszentmihalyi has been compared to Buddhist meditative states such as samadhi and mindfulness. Ronald Siegel describes flow as "mindfulness while accomplishing something." Nobo Komagata and Sachiko Komagata, however, are critical of characterizing the notion of "flow" as a special case of mindfulness, noting that the connection is more complicated. Zen Buddhism has a concept called Mushin (無心, no mind) which is also similar to flow.

Christopher K. Germer, clinical instructor in psychology at Harvard Medical School and a founding member of the Institute for Meditation and Psychotherapy, has stated: "Positive psychology, which focuses on human flourishing rather than mental illness, is also learning a lot from Buddhism, particularly how mindfulness and compassion can enhance wellbeing. This has been the domain of Buddhism for the past two millennia and we're just adding a scientific perspective."

Martin Seligman and Buddhist monk Thanissaro Bhikkhu have pointed out that the framework of Positive psychology is ethically neutral, and hence within that framework, you could argue that "a serial killer leads a pleasant life, a skilled Mafia hit man leads a good life, and a fanatical terrorist leads a meaningful life." Thanissaro argues that Positive psychology should also look into the ethical dimensions of the good life. Regarding the example of flow states he writes:

A common assumption is that what you do to induce a sense of flow is purely a personal issue, and ultimately what you do doesn't really matter. What matters is the fact of psychological flow. You're most likely to experience flow wherever you have the skill, and you're most likely to develop skill wherever you have the aptitude, whether it's in music, sport, hunting, meditating, etc. From the Buddha's point of view, however, it really does matter what you do to gain gratification, for some skills are more conducive to stable, long-term happiness than others, due to their long-term consequences.

The skills that Thanissaro argues are more conductive to happiness include Buddhist virtues like harmlessness, generosity, moral restraint, and the development of good will as well as mindfulness, concentration, discernment.

=== Naropa University ===
"Buddhism will come to the West as a psychology."

— Chogyam Trungpa, 1974 (Note: Cited in Goleman, 2004, p. 72. Goleman, who was teaching psychology at Harvard University at the time, goes on to write: "The very idea that Buddhism had anything to do with psychology was at the time for most of us in the field patently absurd. But that attitude reflected more our own naivete than anything to do with Buddhism. It was news that Buddhism — like many of the world's great spiritual traditions — harbored a theory of mind and its workings" (p. 72).)

In his introduction to his 1975 book, Glimpses of the Abhidharma, Chogyam Trungpa Rinpoche wrote:

Many modern psychologists have found that the discoveries and explanations of the abhidharma coincide with their own recent discoveries and new ideas; as though the Abhidharma, which was taught 2,500 years ago, had been redeveloped in the modern idiom.

Trungpa Rinpoche's book goes on to describe the nanosecond phenomenological sequence by which a sensation becomes conscious using the Buddhist concepts of the "five aggregates".

In 1974, Trungpa Rinpoche founded the Naropa Institute, now called Naropa University. Since 1975, this accredited university has offered degrees in "contemplative psychology". (Note: Naropa University has also been a training ground and meeting place for many of today's most prolific popularizers of a Buddhism-informed psychology such as Jack Kornfield and a psychologically savvy Buddhism such as Joseph Goldstein)

=== Mind and life institute ===
Every two years, since 1987, the Dalai Lama has convened "Mind and Life" gatherings of Buddhists and scientists. (Note: Books that have documented these meetings include Begley (2007), Davidson & Harrington (2002), Goleman (1997), Goleman (2004), Harrington & Zajonc (2006), Haywood & Varela (2001), Houshmand et al. (1999), Varela (1997), and Zajonc & Houshmand (2004).) Reflecting on one Mind and Life session in March 2000, psychologist Daniel Goleman notes:

Since the time of Gautama Buddha in the fifth century BC, an analysis of the mind and its workings has been central to the practices of his followers. This analysis was codified during the first millennium after his death within the system called, in the Pali language of Buddha's day, Abhidhamma (or Abhidharma in Sanskrit), which means 'ultimate doctrine' ... Every branch of Buddhism today has a version of these basic psychological teachings on the mind, as well as its own refinements.

== Buddhist techniques in clinical settings ==
For over a millennium, throughout the world, Buddhist practices have been used for non-Buddhist ends. (Note: For instance, ninth-century Chinese Patriarch Zongmi referred to non-Buddhist uses of Buddhist meditation practices as bonpu meditation. For more information, see Zongmi's "Five Types of Zen") More recently, clinical psychologists, theorists and researchers have incorporated Buddhist practices in widespread formalized psychotherapies. Buddhist mindfulness practices have been explicitly incorporated into a variety of psychological treatments. More tangentially, psychotherapies dealing with cognitive restructuring share core principles with ancient Buddhist antidotes to personal suffering.

=== Mindfulness practices ===
Fromm distinguishes between two types of meditative techniques that have been used in psychotherapy:

1. auto-suggestion used to induce relaxation;
2. meditation "to achieve a higher degree of non-attachment, of non-greed, and of non-illusion; briefly, those that serve to reach a higher level of being" (p. 50).

Fromm attributes techniques associated with the latter to Buddhist mindfulness practices. (Note: For an authoritative source regarding Buddhist mindfulness meditation, Fromm (2002) references Nyanaponika (1996). Fromm (2002, pp. 52-53) goes on to write: There are two core doctrines acceptable to many who, like myself, are not Buddhists, yet are deeply impressed by the core of Buddhist teaching. I refer first of all to the doctrine that the goal of life is to overcome greed, hate, and ignorance. In this respect Buddhism does not basically differ from Jewish and Christian ethical norms. More important, and different from the Jewish and Christian tradition, is another element of Buddhist thinking: the demand for optimal awareness of the processes inside and outside oneself. For an overview of Buddhist mindfulness practices, see Buddhist meditation and Satipatthana Sutta.)

Two increasingly popular therapeutic practices using Buddhist mindfulness techniques are Jon Kabat-Zinn's Mindfulness-Based Stress Reduction (MBSR) and Marsha M. Linehan's dialectical behavioral therapy (DBT). Other prominent therapies that use mindfulness include Steven C. Hayes' Acceptance and Commitment Therapy (ACT), Adaptation Practice founded in 1978 by the British psychiatrist and Zen Buddhist Clive Sherlock and, based on MBSR, Mindfulness-based Cognitive Therapy (MBCT) (Segal et al., 2002).

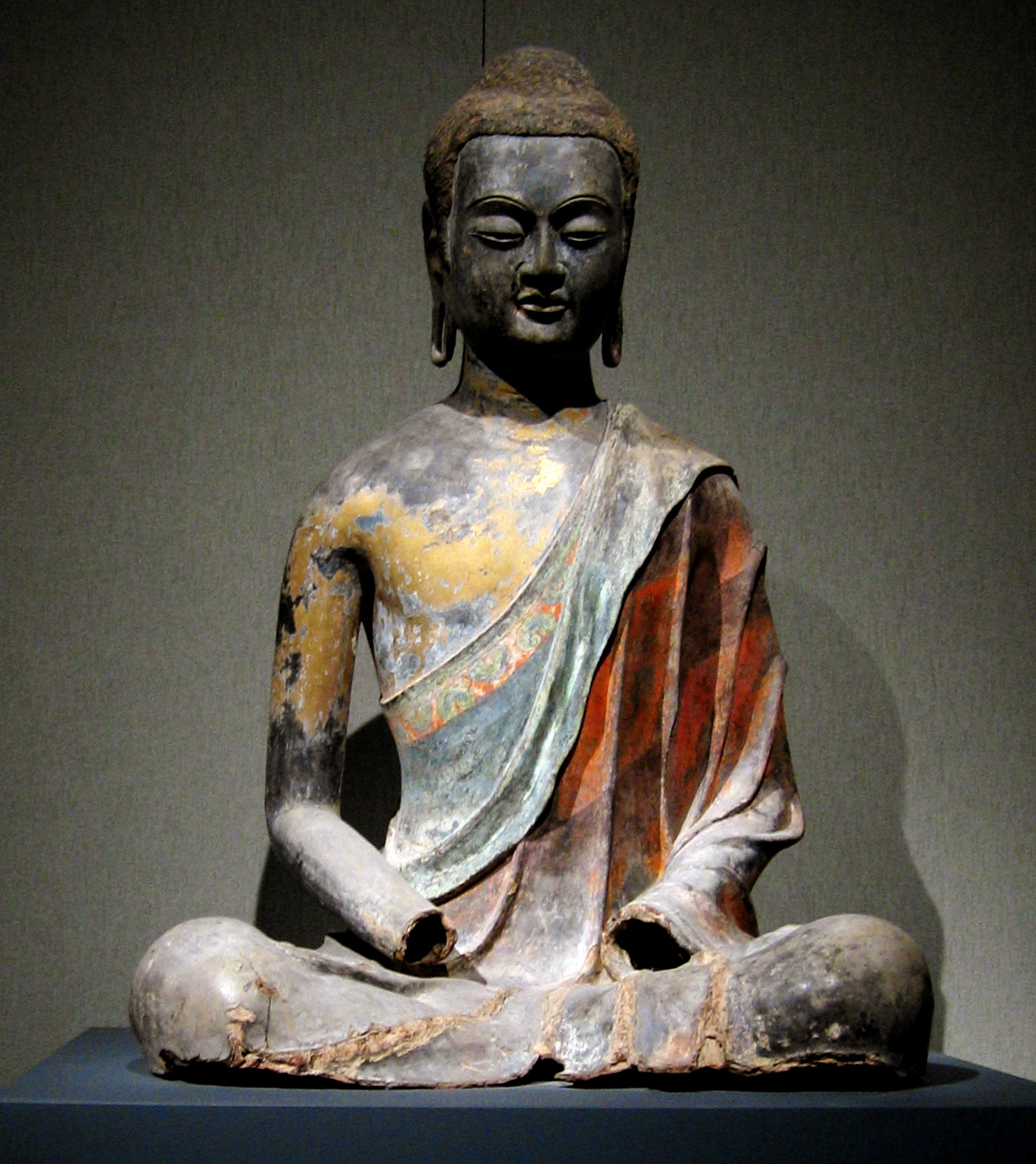
Clinical researchers have found Buddhist mindfulness practices to help alleviate anxiety, depression and certain personality disorders.

==== Mindfulness Based Stress Reduction (MBSR) ====
Kabat-Zinn developed the eight-week MBSR program over a ten-year period with over four thousand patients at the University of Massachusetts Medical Center. Describing the MBSR program, Kabat-Zinn writes:

This 'work' involves above all the regular, disciplined practice of moment-to-moment awareness or mindfulness, the complete 'owning' of each moment of your experience, good, bad, or ugly. This is the essence of full catastrophe living.

According to Kabat-Zinn, a one-time Zen practitioner, (Note: In Kabat-Zinn, for instance, he writes: "Because I practice and teach mindfulness, I have the recurring experience that people frequently make the assumption that I am a Buddhist. When asked, I usually respond that I am not a Buddhist (although there was a period in my life when I did think of myself in that way, and trained and continue to train in and have huge respect and love for different Buddhist traditions and practices), but I am a student of Buddhist meditation, and a devoted one, not because I am devoted to Buddhism per se, but because I have found its teachings and its practices to be so profound and so universally applicable, revealing and healing." He goes on to write:)

Although at this time mindfulness meditation is most commonly taught and practiced within the context of Buddhism, its essence is universal ... Yet it is no accident that mindfulness comes out of Buddhism, which has as its overriding concerns the relief of suffering and the dispelling of illusions.

It would be based on relatively intensive training in Buddhist meditation without the Buddhism (as I liked to put it), and yoga.

Kabat-Zinn describes the MBSR program, as well as its scientific basis and the evidence for its clinical effectiveness, in his 1990 book Full Catastrophe Living, which was revised and reissued in 2013.

==== Mindfulness-based pain management ====
Mindfulness-based pain management (MBPM) is a mindfulness-based intervention (MBI) providing specific applications for people living with chronic pain and illness. Adapting the core concepts and practices of mindfulness-based stress reduction (MBSR) and mindfulness-based cognitive therapy (MBCT), MBPM includes a distinctive emphasis on the practice of 'loving-kindness', and has been seen as sensitive to concerns about removing mindfulness teaching from its original ethical framework within Buddhism. It was developed by Vidyamala Burch and is delivered through the programs of Breathworks. It has been subject to a range of clinical studies demonstrating its effectiveness.

==== Dialectical Behavioral Therapy (DBT) ====
In writing about DBT, Zen practitioner (Note: According to Kabat-Zinn: "Marsha [Linehan] herself is a long-time practitioner of Zen, and DBT incorporates the spirit and principles of mindfulness and whatever degree of formal practice is possible.") Linehan states:

As its name suggests, its overriding characteristic is an emphasis on 'dialectics' – that is, the reconciliation of opposites in a continual process of synthesis ... This emphasis on acceptance as a balance to change flows directly from the integration of a perspective drawn from Eastern (Zen) practice with Western psychological practice. (Note: The parenthetical "(Zen)" is included in Linehan's actual text.)

Similarly, Linehan writes:

Mindfulness skills are central to DBT ... They are the first skills taught and are [reviewed] ... every week ... The skills are psychological and behavioral versions of meditation practices from Eastern spiritual training. I have drawn most heavily from the practice of Zen

Controlled clinical studies have demonstrated DBT's effectiveness for people with borderline personality disorder. (Note: Regarding DBT's empirical effectiveness, Linehan (1993b, p. 1) cites Linehan et al. (1991), Linehan & Heard (1993), and Linehan et al. (in press). Clinical experience has shown DBT to be effective for people with borderline personality disorder as well as other Axis II Cluster B disorders.)

==== Acceptance and Commitment Therapy (ACT) ====
ACT did not explicitly emerge from Buddhism, but its concepts often parallel ideas from Buddhist and mystical traditions. ACT has been defined by its originators as a method that "uses acceptance and mindfulness processes, and commitment and behavioral activation processes to produce psychological flexibility."

Mindfulness in ACT is defined to be a combination of four aspects of the psychological flexibility model, which is ACT's applied theory:

1. Acceptance (openness to and engagement with present experience);
2. Cognitive defusion (attending to the ongoing process of thought instead of automatically interacting with events as structured by prediction, judgment, and interpretation);
3. Contact with the present moment (attention to the present external and internal world in a manner that is flexible, fluid, and voluntary);
4. A transcendent sense of self or "self as context" (an interconnected sense of consciousness that maintains contact with the "I/Here/Nowness" of awareness and its interconnection with "You/There/Then").

These four aspects of mindfulness in ACT are argued to stem from Relational Frame Theory, the research program on language and cognition that underlies ACT at the basic level. For example, "self as context" is argued to emerge from deictic verbal relations such as I/You, or Here/There, which RFT laboratories have shown to help establish perspective taking skills and interconnection with others.

Most ACT self-help books (e.g.,) and many tested ACT protocols teach formal contemplative practice skills, but by this definition of mindfulness, such defusion skills as word repetition (taking a difficult thought, distilling it to a single word, and saying it repeatedly out loud for 30 seconds) are also viewed as mindfulness methods.

==== Adaptation Practice ====
The British psychiatrist Clive Sherlock, who trained in the traditional Rinzai School of Zen, developed Adaptation Practice, the foundation of mindfulness, in 1977 based on the profound mindfulness/awareness training of Zen daily-life practice and meditation. Adaptation Practice is used for long-term relief of depression, anxiety, anger, stress and other emotional problems.

==== Existential Therapy ====
Originated from the philosophical school of existentialism, existential therapy seeks to revise the fundamental nature of human beings. Before commencing the treatment, they first ask the following question: what does it mean to be human? This then makes existential therapy distinct from other therapeutic techniques, which emphasise more on specific techniques with limited critical evaluation of their effectiveness on the subject.

This sheds light on the role Buddhism plays on psychotherapy. P. de Silva holds that Buddhist psychology is ‘’therapy oriented’’, since it not only provides an explanation for our mental ill-health and suffering, but it also offers effective treatments to them. For example, Buddhism may diagnose our anxiety, depression, and other symptoms of mental illness as stemming from greed and aversion, while encouraging us to treat them by taking the Noble Eightfold Path, developing tranquillity and insight, through the meditative practices of samatha and vipassana. Moreover, S. N. Goenka acknowledges that, the ultimate objective of undertaking Buddha’s teaching is to purify the mind, as expounded in Dhammapada 183:

Abstain from unwholesome deeds,

perform wholesome deeds;

purify your own mind-

this is the teaching of the Buddhas.

If so, then one shall understand that while symptoms of mental illness are often indirectly treated by practicing Buddha’s teaching, these objectives are only highly cursory and are not the main focus of the practice.

=== Cognitive restructuring ===
Dr. Albert Ellis, considered the "grandfather of cognitive-behavioral therapy" (CBT), has written:

Many of the principles incorporated in the theory of rational-emotive psychotherapy are not new; some of them, in fact, were originally stated several thousands of years ago, especially by the Greek and Roman Stoic philosophers (such as Epictetus and Marcus Aurelius) and by some of the ancient Taoist and Buddhist thinkers (see Suzuki, 1956, and Watts, 1959, 1960). (Note: Elsewhere in Ellis (1991, pp. 336-37), in response to concerns voiced by Watts (1960) regarding overly rationalistic psychotherapy, Ellis expresses a caveat specifically regarding Zen-like spiritual pursuits. Ellis notes that "perhaps the main goal" of a patient of rational-emotive therapy "is that of commitment, risk-taking, joy of being; and sensory experiencing, as long as it does not merely consist of short-range self-defeating hedonism of a childish variety ..." Ellis then adds: "Even some of the Zen Buddhist strivings after extreme sensation, or satori, would not be thoroughly incompatible with some of the goals a devotee of rational-emotive living might seek for himself — as long as he did not seek this mode of sensing as an escape from facing some of his fundamental anxieties or hostilities.")

To give but one example, Buddhism identifies anger and ill-will as basic hindrances to spiritual development (see, for instance, the Five Hindrances, Ten Fetters and kilesas). A common Buddhist antidote for anger is the use of active contemplation of loving thoughts (see, for instance, metta). This is similar to using a CBT technique known as "emotional training" which Ellis describes in the following manner:

Think of an intensely pleasant experience you have had with the person with whom you now feel angry. When you have fantasized such a pleasant experience and have actually given yourself unusually good, intensely warm feelings toward that person as a result of this remembrance, continue the process. Recall pleasant experiences and good feelings, and try to make these feelings paramount over your feelings of hostility. (Note: In the example cited from Ellis (1997), a person attempts to replace their hostile feelings with pleasant feelings associated with the same individual. In general, with Buddhist metta practice, one elicits feelings of loving kindness by contemplating on a benefactor and one then uses these self-elicited warm feelings to then permeate the experiencing of a perceived "enemy." Moreover, Buddhist metta practice directs loving kindness towards all beings, near or far, kind or brutal, human or non-human.)

== Reaction from Buddhist traditionalists ==
Some Buddhist practitioners have expressed concern that attempts to view Buddhism through the lens of psychology diminishes the Buddha's liberating message.

Patrick Kearney has written that the effort to integrate the teachings of the Buddha by interpreting it through the view of psychologies has led to "a growing confusion about the nature of Buddhist teachings and a willingness to distort and dilute these teachings". He is critical of Jack Kornfield and Mark Epstein for holding that psychological techniques are a necessity for some Buddhists and of Jeffrey Rubin for writing that enlightenment might not be possible. Kearney writes:

Epstein and Rubin want to rewrite Buddhism on their own terms, taking the ocean of the Buddha's wisdom and reducing it to a puddle small enough to accommodate the views of Freud and his successors.

| | Romantic / humanistic psychology | early Buddhism |
| spiritual illness | divided self | clinging |
| ultimate experience | feeling of oneness | knowledge of Awakening |
| cure | on-going personal integration | Awakening |

American Theravada monk Thanissaro Bhikkhu has also criticized the interpretation of Buddhism through Psychology, which has different values and goals, derived from roots such as European Romanticism and Protestant Christianity. He also identifies broad commonalities between "Romantic/humanistic psychology" and early Buddhism: beliefs in human (versus divine) intervention with an approach that is experiential, pragmatic and therapeutic. Thanissaro Bhikkhu traces the roots of modern spiritual ideals from German Romantic Era philosopher Immanuel Kant through American psychologist and philosopher William James, Jung and humanistic psychologist Abraham Maslow. Thanissaro sees their view as centered on the idea of healing the 'divided self', an idea which is alien to Buddhism. Thanissaro asserts that there are also core differences between Romantic/humanistic psychology and Buddhism. These are summarized in the adjacent table. Thanissaro implicitly deems those who impose Romantic/humanistic goals on the Buddha's message as "Buddhist Romantics".

The same similarities have been recognized by David McMahan when describing Buddhist modernism.

Recognizing the widespread alienation and social fragmentation of modern life, Thanissaro Bhikkhu writes:

When Buddhist Romanticism speaks to these needs, it opens the gate to areas of dharma [the Buddha's teachings] that can help many people find the solace they're looking for. In doing so, it augments the work of psychotherapy ... However, Buddhist Romanticism also helps close the gate to areas of the dharma that would challenge people in their hope for an ultimate happiness based on interconnectedness. Traditional dharma calls for renunciation and sacrifice, on the grounds that all interconnectedness is essentially unstable, and any happiness based on this instability is an invitation to suffering. True happiness has to go beyond interdependence and interconnectedness to the unconditioned ... The gate [of Buddhist Romanticism] closes off radical areas of the dharma designed to address levels of suffering remaining even when a sense of wholeness has been mastered."

Another Theravada monk, Bhikkhu Bodhi has also criticized the presentation of certain Buddhist teachings mixed with psychological and Humanistic views as being authentic Buddhism. This risks losing the essence of the liberating and radical message of the Buddha, which is focused on attaining nirvana:

What I am concerned about is the trend, common among present-day Buddhist teachers, of recasting the core principles of the Buddha's teachings into largely psychological terms and then saying, "This is Dhamma." When this is done we may never get to see that the real purpose of the teaching, in its own framework, is not to induce "healing" or "wholeness" or "self-acceptance," but to propel the mind in the direction of deliverance – and to do so by attenuating, and finally extricating, all those mental factors responsible for our bondage and suffering. We should remember that the Buddha did not teach the Dhamma as an "art of living" – though it includes that – but above all as a path to deliverance, a path to final liberation and enlightenment. And what the Buddha means by enlightenment is not a celebration of the limitations of the human condition, not a passive submission to our frailties, but an overcoming of those limitations by making a radical, revolutionary breakthrough to an altogether different dimension of being.

== Popular psychology and spirituality ==
=== Mainstream teachers and popularizers ===
In 1961, philosopher and professor Alan Watts wrote:

If we look deeply into such ways of life as Buddhism and Taoism, Vedanta and Yoga, we do not find either philosophy or religion as these are understood in the West. We find something more nearly resembling psychotherapy ... The main resemblance between these Eastern ways of life and Psychotherapy is in the concern of both with bringing about changes of consciousness, changes in our ways of feeling our own existence and our relation to human society and the natural world. The psychotherapist has, for the most part, been interested in changing the consciousness of peculiarly disturbed individuals. The disciplines of Buddhism and Taoism are, however, concerned with changing the consciousness of normal, socially adjusted people.

Since Watts's early observations and musings, there have been many other important contributors to the contemporary popularization of the integration of Buddhist meditation with psychology including Kornfield (1993), Joseph Goldstein, Tara Brach, Epstein (1995) and Nhat Hanh (1998).

== See also ==
- Bhavacakra
- Buddhism and science
- Buddhism and Western Philosophy
- Buddhist philosophy
- Compassion focused therapy
- Eastern philosophy and clinical psychology
- Health applications and clinical studies of meditation
- Indian psychology
- Naropa University
- Other-centred therapy - A psychology apporach grounded in Buddhist principles

== Sources and bibliography ==
- American Psychiatric Association (1994). Diagnostic and Statistical Manual of Mental Disorders: DSM-IV — 4th ed. Washington, DC: American Psychiatric Association. ISBN 0-89042-062-9.
- Bechert, Heinz (2004). "Buddha, Life of the". In Buswell, R. E. Jr. (ed.). Encyclopedia of Buddhism. Vol. 1. New York: Macmillan Reference USA. pp. 82–88.
- Benoit, Hubert (1955, 1995). The Supreme Doctrine. Portland, OR: Sussex Academic Press. Cited in Fromm et al. (1960). ISBN 1-898723-14-1.
- Berkhin, Igor; Hartelius, Glenn (2011). "Why Altered States Are Not Enough: A Perspective from Buddhism". International Journal of Transpersonal Studies. 30 (1–2): 63–68. doi:10.24972/ijts.2011.30.1-2.63. ISSN 1321-0122.
- Berman, A. E., & Stevens, L. (2015). EEG manifestations of nondual experiences in meditators. Consciousness and Cognition, 31, 1–11.
- Bodhi, Bhikkhu (ed.) (2000). A Comprehensive Manual of Abhidhamma: The Abhidhammattha Sangaha of Ācariya Anuruddha. Seattle, WA: BPS Pariyatti Editions. ISBN 1-928706-02-9. - also online: http://www.accesstoinsight.org/lib/authors/bodhi/abhiman.html
- Brazier, David (2001), The Feeling Buddha, Robinson Publishing
- Curtis, C. (2016). The Experience of Self/No-Self in Aikido. Journal of Consciousness Studies, 23(1-2), 58–68.
- Davidson, Richard J. & Anne Harrington (eds.) (2002). Visions of Compassion: Western Scientists and Tibetan Buddhists Examine Human Nature. NY: Oxford University Press. ISBN 0-19-513043-X.
- Dockett, K. H., Dudley-Grant, G. R., & Bankart, C. P. (2003). Psychology and Buddhism: From individual to global community: Springer Science & Business Media.
- Ellis, Albert (1962, 1991). Reason and Emotion in Psychotherapy. NY: Carol Publishing Group. ISBN 0-8065-0909-0.
- Ellis, Albert (1977, 1997). Anger: How to Live with and without It. Secaucus, NJ: Carol Publishing Group. ISBN 0-8065-0937-6.
- Epstein, Mark (2004), Thoughts Without A Thinker: Psychotherapy from a Buddhist Perspective, Basic Books, Kindle Edition
- Epstein, Mark (1995). Thoughts without a Thinker: Psychotherapy from a Buddhist Perspective. NY: Basic Books. ISBN 0-465-08585-7.
- Fromm, Erich, D. T. Suzuki & Richard De Martino (1960). Zen Buddhism and Psychoanalysis. NY: Harper & Row. ISBN 0-06-090175-6.
- Fromm, Erich (1989, 2002). The Art of Being. NY: Continuum. ISBN 0-8264-0673-4.
- Gaskins, R. W. (1999). " Adding legs to a snake": A reanalysis of motivation and the pursuit of happiness from a Zen Buddhist perspective. Journal of Educational Psychology, 91(2), 204–215.
- Goleman, D., & Thurman, Robert A. F (Eds.) (1991). MindScience: An East-West dialogue : proceedings of a symposium sponsored by the Mind/Body Medical Institute of Harvard Medical School & New England Deaconess Hospital and Tibet House New York. Boston: Wisdom Publications.
- Goleman, Daniel (ed.) (1997). Healing Emotions: Conversations With the Dalai Lama on Mindfulness, Emotions, and Health. Boston: Shambhala Publications. ISBN 1-57062-212-4.
- Goleman, Daniel (2004). Destructive Emotions: A Scientific Dialogue with the Dalai Lama. NY: Bantam Dell. ISBN 0-553-38105-9.
- Gopnik, Alison (2009). Could David Hume Have Known about Buddhism?: Charles François Dolu, the Royal College of La Flèche, and the Global Jesuit Intellectual Network. Hume Studies, 35(1), 5–28.
- Grabovac, A. D., Lau, M. A., & Willett, B. R. (2011). Mechanisms of mindfulness: A Buddhist psychological model. Mindfulness, 2(3), 154–166.
- Gyatso, Geshe Kelsang (2nd. ed., 1997) Understanding the Mind: The Nature and Power of the Mind. Tharpa Publications. ISBN 978-0-948006-78-4
- Harrington, Anne & Arthur Zajonc (2006). The Dalai Lama at MIT. Harvard University Press. ISBN 0-674-02319-6.
- Hayward, Jeremy W. & Francisco J. Varela (eds.) (1992, 2001). Gentle Bridges: Conversations with the Dalai Lama on the Sciences of Mind. Boston: Shambhala Publications. ISBN 1-57062-893-9.
- Houshmand, Zara, Robert B. Livingston & B. Alan Wallace (eds.) (1999). Consciousness at the Crossroads: Conversations with the Dalai Lama on Brain Science and Buddhism. Ithaca: Snow Lion Publications. ISBN 1-55939-127-8.
- Josipovic, Z. (2010). Duality and nonduality in meditation research. Consciousness and Cognition, 19(4), 1119–1121.
- Kabat-Zinn, Jon (1990). Full catastrophe living: using the wisdom of your body and mind to face stress, pain, and illness. New York, NY: Dell Publishing. ISBN 0-385-30312-2. OCLC 24097980.
- Kabat-Zinn, Jon (2005). Coming to our senses: healing ourselves and the world through mindfulness. New York: Hyperion. ISBN 0-7868-8654-4. OCLC 57254284.
- Kalupahana, David J. (1992), The Principles of Buddhist Psychology, Delhi: Sri Satguru Publications.
- Kang, C., & Whittingham, K. (2010). Mindfulness: A dialogue between Buddhism and clinical psychology. Mindfulness, 1(3), 161–173.
- Kornfield, Jack (1993). A Path with Heart: A Guide through the Perils and Promises of Spiritual Life. NY: Bantam Books. ISBN 0-553-37211-4.
- Kudesia, R. S., & Nyima, V. T. (2015). Mindfulness contextualized: An integration of Buddhist and neuropsychological approaches to cognition. Mindfulness, 6(4), 910–925.
- Linehan, Marsha M. (1993a). Cognitive-Behavioral Treatment of Borderline Personality Disorder. NY: Guilford Press. ISBN 0-89862-183-6.
- Linehan, Marsha M. (1993b). Skills Training Manual for Treating Borderline Personality Disorder. NY: Guilford Press. ISBN 0-89862-034-1.
- Linehan, M. M., H. E. Armstrong, A. Suarez, D. Allmon & H. L. Heard (1991). "Cognitive-behavioral treatment of chronically parasuicidal borderline patients." Archives of General Psychiatry, 48, 100–1064. Cited in Linehan (1993b).
- Linehan, M. M., & H. L. Heard (1993). "Impact of treatment accessibility on clinical course of parasuicidal patients." In reply to R.E. Hoffman [Letter to the editor]. Archives of General Psychiatry, 50, 157–158. Cited in Linehan (1993b).
- Linehan, M. M., H. L. Heard, & H. E. Armstrong (in press). "Naturalistic follow-up of a behavioral treatment for chronically suicidal borderline patients. Archives of General Psychiatry. Cited in Linehan (1993b).
- McMahan, David L. (October 2008). The Making of Buddhist Modernism. Oxford University Press. ISBN 978-0-19-518327-6.
- Ñanamoli Thera (trans.) (1993). Dhammacakkappavattana Sutta: Setting Rolling the Wheel of Truth (SN 56.11). Available on-line at http://www.accesstoinsight.org/tipitaka/sn/sn56/sn56.011.nymo.html.
- Nhat Hanh, Thich (1998). Mindfulness and Psychotherapy (audio). Louisville, CO: Sounds True. ISBN 1-56455-632-8.
- Nyanaponika Thera (1954, 1996). The Heart of Buddhist Meditation: A Handbook of Mental Training based on the Buddha's Way of Mindfulness. York Beach, ME: Samuel Weiser. ISBN 0-87728-073-8.
- Nyanaponika Thera, Bhikkhu Bodhi (ed.) & Erich Fromm (fwd.) (1986). Visions of Dhamma: Buddhist Writings of Nyanaponika Thera. York Beach, ME: Weiser Books. ISBN 0-87728-669-8.
- Rhys Davids, Caroline A. F. ([1900], 2003). Buddhist Manual of Psychological Ethics, of the Fourth Century B.C., being a Translation, now made for the First Time, from the Original Pāli, of the First Book of the Abhidhamma-Piṭaka, entitled Dhamma-Saṅgaṇi (Compendium of States or Phenomena). Whitefish, MT: Kessinger Publishing. ISBN 0-7661-4702-9.
- Rhys Davids, Caroline A. F. (1914). Buddhist Psychology: An Inquiry into the Analysis and Theory of Mind in Pali Literature, London: Bell and sons.
- Rhys Davids, Caroline A. F. (1936). Birth of Indian Psychology and its Development in Buddhism.
- Sato, Koji (1958). "Psychotherapeutic Implications of Zen" in Psychologia, An International Journal of Psychology in the Orient. Vol. I, No. 4 (1958). Cited in Fromm et al. (1960).
- Schwartz, Tony (1996). What Really Matters: Searching for Wisdom in America. NY: Bantam Books. ISBN 0-553-37492-3.
- Segal, Zindel V., J. Mark G. Williams, & John D. Teasdale (2002). Mindfulness-Based Cognitive Therapy for Depression: A New Approach to Preventing Relapse. NY: Guilford Press. ISBN 1-57230-706-4.
- Suzuki, D.T. & Carl G. Jung (fwd.) (1948, 1964, 1991). An Introduction to Zen Buddhism. NY: Grove Press. ISBN 0-8021-3055-0.
- Suzuki, D.T. (1949, 1956). Zen Buddhism. NY: Doubleday Anchor Books. Cited in Ellis (1991) and Fromm (1960).
- Thanissaro Bhikkhu (2012). The Roots of Buddhist Romanticism.
- Varela, F. J., Thompson, E., & Rosch, E. (1991). The embodied mind: Cognitive science and human experience. Cambridge, Mass: MIT Press.
- Varela, Francisco J. (ed.) (1997). Sleeping, Dreaming, and Dying: An Exploration of Consciousness with the Dalai Lama. Somerville, MA: Wisdom Publications. ISBN 0-86171-123-8.
- Virtbauer, Gerald (March 2012). "The Western reception of Buddhism as a psychological and ethical system: developments, dialogues, and perspectives". Mental Health, Religion & Culture. 15 (3): 251–263. doi:10.1080/13674676.2011.569928. S2CID 145760146.
- Virtbauer, Gerald (1 April 2014). "Characteristics of Buddhist Psychology". SFU Forschungsbulletin: 1–9. doi:10.15135/2014.2.1.1-9.
- Wallace, B. A., & Shapiro, S. L. (2006). Mental balance and well-being: building bridges between Buddhism and Western psychology. American psychologist, 61(7), 690.
- Watts, Alan W. (1959). The Way of Zen. NY: New American Library. Cited in Ellis (1991).
- Watts, Alan W. (1960). Nature, Man and Sex. NY: New American Library. Cited in Ellis (1991).
- Watts, Alan W. (1961, 1975). Psychotherapy East and West. NY: Random House. ISBN 0-394-71610-8.
- Zajonc, Arthur (ed.) with Zara Houshmand (2004). The New Physics and Cosmology: Dialogues with the Dalai Lama. NY: Oxford University Press. ISBN 0-19-515994-2.

=== Related texts ===
- Fryba, Mirko (1995). The Practice of Happiness: Exercises & Techniques for Developing Mindfulness, Wisdom, and Joy. Boston: Shambhala. ISBN 1-57062-123-3.
- Segal, Zindel V., J. Mark G. Williams, & John D. Teasdale (2002). Mindfulness-Based Cognitive Therapy for Depression. NY: Guilford. ISBN 978-1-57230-706-3.
