= Eastern philosophy in clinical psychology =

Application of Eastern philosophies in the field of clinical psychology

Eastern philosophy in clinical psychology refers to the influence of Eastern philosophies on the practice of clinical psychology.

== Historical clinical psychologists ==
- Carl Jung read the German translations by Richard Wilhelm of The Secret of the Golden Flower, the I Ching.
- Karen Horney studied Zen-Buddhism.
- Fritz Perls also studied Zen Buddhism.
- Erich Fromm collaborated with D. T. Suzuki in a 1957 workshop on "Zen Buddhism and Psychoanalysis"; wrote the foreword to a 1986 anthology of Nyanaponika Thera's essays.
- Akhilananda explain Mental health through Eastern Philosophy.

== Contemporary clinicians ==
- Marsha M. Linehan incorporates mindfulness techniques (particularly Zen practices) in her Dialectical Behavioral Therapy (DBT) which has been found to be particularly effective with Cluster-B personality disorders.
- Jon Kabat-Zinn incorporates Buddhist mindfulness techniques in his Mindfulness Based Stress Reduction (MBSR) program. Kabat-Zinn describes the program in his book Full Catastrophe Living.

== Techniques used in clinical settings ==
- Vipassana - trains one to perceive the momentary arising and dissipating of all phenomena, nurturing the calm, detached recognition of all things' impermanence and interdependence.

== See also ==
- History of medicine
- History of philosophy
- Buddhism and psychology
- Research on meditation
- Eastern philosophy
- Sufi philosophy
- Iranian philosophy
- Hasidic philosophy
- Psychology of religion
- Mindfulness-based stress reduction
- Mindfulness-based pain management
- Mindfulness-based cognitive therapy
