= Arlene Shechet =

American sculptor

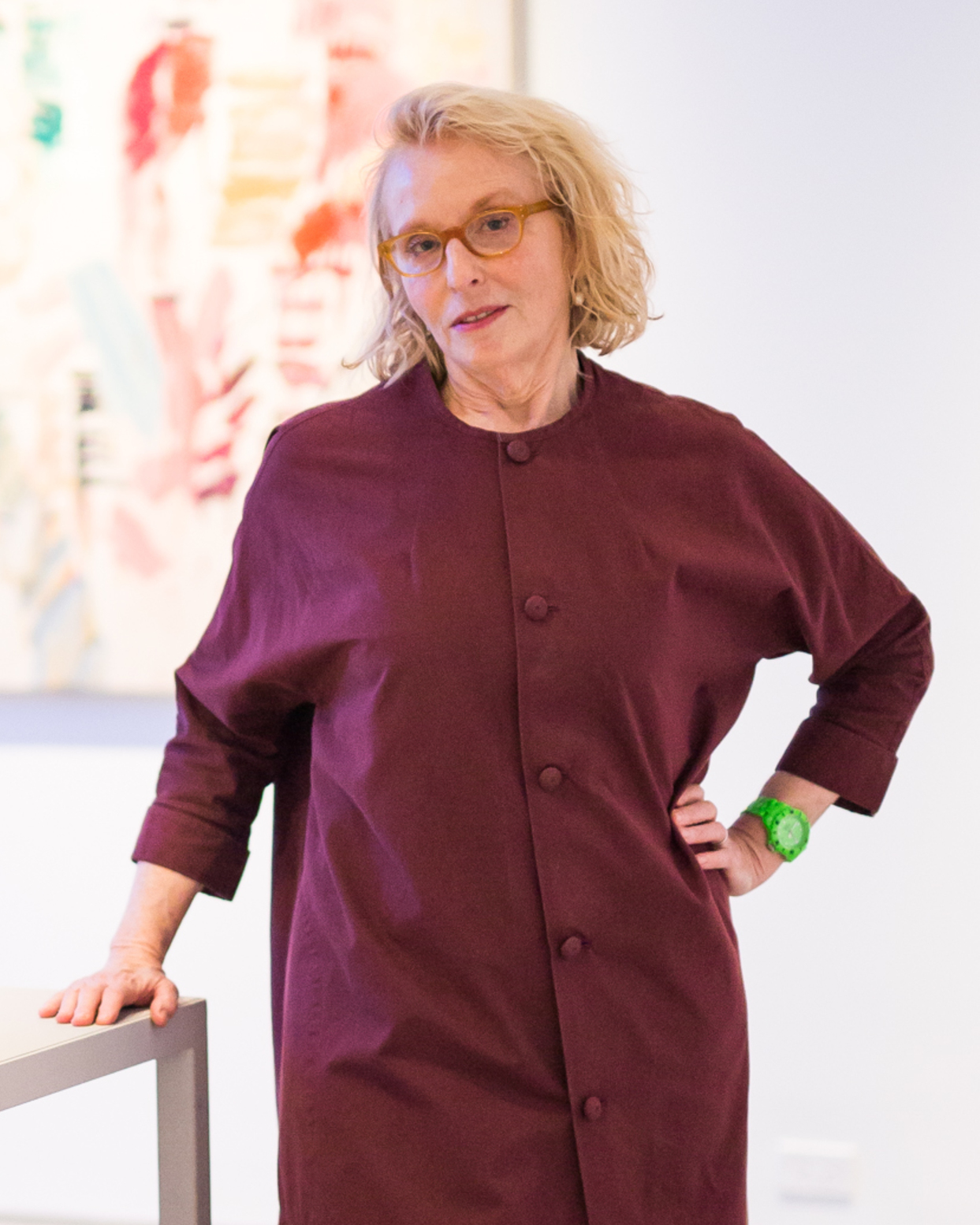
- Arlene Shechet in the Jewish Museum in 2018
- Born: 1951 (age 74–75); New York City, U.S.
- Education: Rhode Island School of Design; New York University
- Known for: Sculpture, installation, public art, paper works
- Spouse: Mark Epstein
- Awards: Guggenheim Fellowship, Anonymous Was A Woman Award, Joan Mitchell Foundation, American Academy of Arts and Letters, National Academy of Design
- Website: Arlene Shechet

Arlene Shechet (born 1951) is an American sculptor known for her inventive, gravity-defying arrangements and experimental use of diverse materials. Critics describe her work as both technical and intuitive, hybrid and polymorphous, freely mixing surfaces, finishes, styles and references to create visual paradoxes. Her abstract-figurative forms often function as metaphors for bodily experience and the human condition, touching upon imperfection and uncertainty with humor and pathos. New York Times critic Holland Cotter wrote that her career "has encompassed both more or less traditional ceramic pots and wildly experimental abstract forms: amoebalike, intestinal, spiky, sexual, historically referential and often displayed on fantastically inventive pedestals … this is some of the most imaginative American sculpture of the past 20 years."

Shechet's work belongs to the public collections of the Centre Pompidou, Metropolitan Museum of Art, National Gallery of Art, and Los Angeles County Museum of Art, among others. She has exhibited at the Whitney Museum, Institute of Contemporary Art, Boston, Frick Collection, Storm King Art Center and Walker Art Center, among other venues. She was inducted into the American Academy of Arts and Letters as a lifetime member in 2023, and received a Guggenheim Fellowship in 2004.

She lives and works in New York City and the nearby Hudson Valley.

== Early life and career ==
Shechet was born in 1951 in New York City. She earned a BA from New York University and an MFA from Rhode Island School of Design (RISD) in 1978. After graduating, she taught at RISD from 1978 to 1985 and at the Parsons School of Design from 1984 to 1995. In the 1990s her sculpture centered on mound-like plaster and paint forms, the shapes of which were reminiscent of seated Buddhas. During that time, a grant from the Dieu Donné Papermill in New York in 1995 led Shechet to initiate work in cast paper that mimicked clay and Chinese porcelain ware. In the early 2000s she began receiving critical notice for sculpture and installations that built upon both bodies of work and explored Buddhist iconography and themes of flux, growth, enlightenment.

Recognition came after Shechet turned to clay as her principal medium in the latter 2000s, when she began producing glazed vessel-sculptures with forms alluding to pot handles, limbs and snouts, lamps and abstracted dancers. In a 2007 review, New York Times critic Roberta Smith wrote that these works were "full of references yet almost debt-free ... mov[ing] effortlessly between art and religion and East and West, and from painting and sculpture to craft and ritual." Museum exhibitions followed, including solo shows at the Tang Museum (2009) and Museum of Contemporary Art Denver (2009), and later, the Weatherspoon Art Museum (2013) and Institute of Contemporary Art, Boston (2015, a twenty-year survey), among others.

Arlene Shechet, No Noise, glazed ceramic on painted wood base, 67" × 17" × 14", 2013.

== Work and reception ==
Critics distinguish Shechet's later sculpture by its contrasts, paradoxes of form, style and process, and unpredictable ranges of hue and texture. Sebastian Smee of The Boston Globe wrote, "It's in the harmonies and tensions between these colors and textures, between suggestions of both order and anarchy, decay and blooming freshness, that these works cough, splutter, and sing … Shechet knows that this life is at once fugitive and monumental, characterized by strange, dreamlike changes of pace, unreasonable, asymmetrical, and ultimately unknowable." Of note is the contrast between Shechet's open-ended, intuitive method, which embraces improvisation, accidents and rule-breaking, and the technical skill and rigor that underlies it, which encompasses fabrication, carving and clay-firing experiments with innovated glaze.

In the solo exhibitions "The Sound of It" (Jack Shainman Gallery, 2010) and "Slip" (Sikkema Jenkins & Co., 2013), Shechet presented ungainly biomorphic ceramic forms on bases made of cast concrete, kiln bricks and painted hardwood, among other materials. The two components functioned as physically and formally inseparable wholes, with the podiums in many cases constituting some of the most commented upon elements of individual works. In a similar upending of formal-versus-functional boundaries, the first show included clusters of bowls, jugs and vitrines—none of practical usefulness—and inversions of the clay firing process in which the free forms were left in their original, unglazed state and the kiln-brick bases given detailed colorful attention. New Yorker critic Peter Schjeldahl declared this work to be "Intimately brawny," and added, "the show lets us in on the studio eurekas of an artist with energy and second-nature mastery to burn."

Both exhibitions illustrated another paradox in Shechet's work—the centrality of movement to her essentially solid and fixed sculpture. Her arrangements both adhere to and defy physics, deriving formal and metaphorical tension from what The Brooklyn Rail called a sense of "dialectical balance"—motion without movement—variously suggesting growth, transformation or near-collapse (e.g., Because of the Wind, 2010). A related aspect reviewers have noted is her work's capacity to seemingly morph or "impart multiple identities" when viewed from different angles due to its asymmetries, surprising forms, and highly varied surfaces.

Movement and balance—yielding a sense of precariousness and contingency—also convey two key aspects of Shechet's sculpture: humor and pathos. Humor also arises out of her improvised biomorphic forms, which writers have described as rough-hewn, simultaneously awkward and self-supporting, and comical in their harboring of unexpected apertures, bizarre appendages, protrusions and outcroppings, and displaced limbs and growths. The sculpture No Noise (2013) epitomizes these qualities, suggesting a large-pored, coral biomorph with a nose-like bump that seems upended, as though it had slipped on a banana peel; Roberta Smith likened it to a "flailing hot-water bottle."

=== Curatorial projects ===
Shechet's work is widely referential, often situating itself within and outside art historical contexts and broader culture, and in relation to the spaces it inhabits. In 2014, she began curating a series of playful, subversive exhibitions pairing historical works from museum collections with her own sculpture. The exhibitions "Meissen Recast" (RISD Museum, 2014) and "Porcelain, No Simple Matter" (Frick Collection, 2016) grew out of her two-year residency at the famed Meissen porcelain factory in Germany in 2012–3; notably, she was the first living artist to exhibit in depth at the Frick. In both shows she highlighted the luxury tableware and figurines as industrial objects, juxtaposing them in highly unorthodox placements with her own new, hybrid sculptures. One pairing at the Frick featured a 1730 lotus-inspired porcelain bowl appearing to hover over a rougher object that Shechet cast from the outside of the original bowl's mold; other works were made through irreverent samplings of figurative fragments and various manufacturing by-products. Her subversions of high-low, art-functional hierarchies extended to museum display conventions, with custom walls that were cut away or echoed the factory molds, sideboards, protruding shelves and unorthodox materials and surfaces. Andrea Scott of the New Yorker described the Frick exhibition as a "balancing act between respectful and radical."

Arlene Shechet, Low Hanging Cloud (Lion), installation view, Full Steam Ahead, Madison Square Park, New York, 2018.

Shechet revisited this approach in "Disrupt the View: Arlene Shechet at the Harvard Art Museums (2021), presenting recent work alongside historical German, Japanese, and Chinese works of porcelain and other objects. In the museum-wide exhibition "From Here On Now" (Phillips Collection, 2017), she paired her sculpture with paintings from the museum's collection by Van Gogh, Mondrian, Joan Mitchell, Morris Louis and Walker Evans, among others; in one sculpture, she cast the base to echo a negative of a facing fireplace's opening.Washington Post critic Mark Jenkins said of the show, "most of the links between the contemporary artist and her precursors are intriguingly tangled. That inspiration is no simple matter is one of the lessons of this multifold show." Shechet also curated shows at the Drawing Center and Pace Gallery.

=== Later exhibitions ===
Shechet's installation in Manhattan's Madison Square Park broke with typical public art practices in terms of its varied materials (porcelain, cast iron and wood), custom pedestals, and alterations and additions to the park's setting and seating (e.g., sculpted "skirt seats"). The show's title, Full Steam Ahead, referenced a legendary quote by Admiral David Farragut, whose monument anchored one end of the park. Farragut's statue is seen by some as a symbol of the male domination historically prevalent in both art and society, and somewhat controversially, Shechet negotiated with park officials to empty the pool of water in front of the sculpture, effectively disempowering it. Her dozen human-scaled sculptures suggested diverse personalities and creatures, as well as a family-like intimacy rare for public sculpture; they included Low Hanging Cloud (Lion)—a porcelain piece weighing more than a ton—and the chunky, confident female figure Forward, carved from cherry wood. Shechet also organized a series of events during the exhibition that included actress Fiona Shaw performing T.S. Eliot’s The Waste Land and Dianne Wiest performing excepts from Samuel Beckett’s Happy Days in sculptural costumes designed by Shechet.

Arlene Shechet, Moon in the Morning, glazed ceramic, painted and dyed hardwood, powder coated steel, 75" x 44" x 37", 2022.

In subsequent exhibitions, Shechet continued to parse sculptural, architectural and decorative traditions and develop new dialogues of material and form. Los Angeles Times critic Leah Ollman described her 2019 show at Vielmetter Los Angeles as "generous with tribute and wide-ranging in association," with nods to ceramic sculptors Peter Voulkos and Ken Price, Constantin Brâncuși, Claes Oldenburg and Brutalist architecture. In the exhibition, "Skirts" (Pace, 2020), she obliquely addressed gender disparities, in part through the show's title, which can serve as a verb, sculptural term and misogynistic expression. A Brooklyn Rail review likened its synthesis of painting and sculpture in terms of color, surface and form to painters Joan Miró and Pablo Picasso; the materials included storm-felled tree trunks with knots filled in with brass, hunks of glazed ceramic, cast iron and steel (e.g., The Crown Jewel, 2020). The exhibition "Best Picture" (Vielmetter, 2022) featured vibrant, human-scaled sculptures loosely suggesting Hollywood personalities; she also introduced a new format with two large mixed-material tapestries that offered soft counterpoints to her heavy sculptures. At Frieze Masters (2023, London), Shechet exhibited eleven brilliantly colored and richly textured sculptures and cast paper vessels alongside a medieval illuminated manuscript that served as inspiration.

In 2024, the Storm King Art Center mounted Shechet's exhibition "Girl Group," which included six giant outdoor works welded in steel and aluminum as well as torso-sized, ceramic indoor sculptures that were the generative sources of the outdoor works. The exhibition's title evoked a chorus of works, referenced women rock bands, and commented on the historic dominance of male minimalist artists within public sculpture and at the venue. Working at her largest scale yet (up to 28 feet tall and 30 feet long), Shechet created individual pieces that combined dozens of intricately welded shapes suggesting fabric unfurling in the wind, vivid hand-mixed shades, and an amalgamation of material and finish that juxtaposed matte, glossy, and occasionally, natural aluminum surfaces. New York Times critic Nancy Hass wrote that the show's works "share a language—swooping curves, unexpected apertures and slits, right angles, tunnels, cones, shieldlike expanses—but each has its own personality, creating a sort of universe of mythical creatures."

== Recognition ==
Shechet has received a John S. Guggenheim Fellowship (2004), awards from Anonymous Was A Woman (2010), the American Academy of Arts and Letters (2011) and College Art Association (2016), and grants from the National Endowment for the Arts, New York Foundation for the Arts, Dieu Donné Papermill, Joan Mitchell Foundation and VIA Art Fund, among others. She was inducted into the National Academy of Design in 2016 and into the American Academy of Arts and Letters in 2023.

== Public collections ==
Shechet's work belongs to the public collections of the following institutions, among others:

- Allen Memorial Art Museum
- Art Gallery of New South Wales
- Blanton Museum of Art
- Boca Raton Museum of Art
- Brooklyn Museum
- Centre Pompidou
- Crystal Bridges Museum of American Art
- Harvard Art Museums
- Hirshhorn Museum
- Institute of Contemporary Art Boston
- The Jewish Museum
- Los Angeles County Museum of Art
- Metropolitan Museum of Art
- Museum of Arts and Design
- Museum of Fine Arts St. Petersburg
- Nasher Sculpture Center
- National Gallery of Art
- Nerman Museum of Contemporary Art
- Norton Museum of Art
- Pennsylvania Academy of the Fine Arts
- The Phillips Collection
- Princeton University Art Museum
- Rhode Island School of Design Museum
- San Jose Museum of Art
- Smith College Museum of Art
- US Department of State
- Walker Art Center
- Whitney Museum
