= Buddhist personality types =

Psychology of personality types in Buddhism

Buddhism has developed a complex psychology of personality types (Pali: Puggala-paññatti), personality traits and underlying tendencies (anusaya). This was mostly developed in the Buddhist Abhidharma literature and its major concern was to identify differing types of persons for pedagogical and soteriological ends. The Buddha was said to have skillfully taught different teachings depending on each person's personality and level of mental development. The development of a personality psychology was important to the Abhidharmikas who sought to adapt Buddhist teachings and practice to each personality type so as to better lead persons to nirvana by purifying their minds of their mental defilements.

== Typologies ==
The Buddhist view of the person is encapsulated by the not-self teaching, which states that there is no unchanging core to a person, no soul (atman) or Ego. A person is defined as a stream of phenomenal events (termed dhammas) in a causal series of mind moments (samaya), and therefore an 'individual' or 'person' is merely a conventional designation for a collection of constantly changing processes (the five skandhas). However, in the analytical Abhidharma works, Buddhists outlined how different individuals could still be dominated by certain proclivities and tendencies, patterns of thought which arose consistently enough to allow one to designate different 'personality types'.

=== Theravada ===
A scheme of six traits or temperaments (caritas) can be seen in the Niddesa of the Khuddaka Nikaya, as well as in the Nettipakaraṇa. In the Visuddhimagga (Path of Purification), the scholar Buddhaghosa draws on this schema to present his meditation teachings. The major temperaments and recommended meditations are:

- Greed (lobha), the recommended meditation is unattractiveness (asubha).
- Aversion (dosa), the recommended meditation is loving-kindness (mettābhāvanā).
- Delusion (moha), the recommended meditation is "questioning about expositions [of Dhamma] given in brief, timely hearing of the Dhamma and timely discussion of the Dhamma, and to reside with a teacher."
- Faithful (saddha), the recommended meditation is the three jewels, as well as ethical precepts (sīlāni).
- Wise (pañña), the recommended meditation is the "insight sign (vipassanā nimitta)", namely the aspects (ākāra) of anicca, dukkha and anattā.
- Thinking/speculative (vitakka), the recommended meditation is mindfulness of breathing.

The Theravada Abhidhamma Pitaka contains a section entitled 'The Puggala-paññatti', which translates to "designation of person types" which contains an extensive outline of a wide array of personality traits. The Abhidhamma generally considered twelve major classes of persons, four of the worldly ordinary class (puthujjana) and eight of the spiritual elect (ariya, the noble ones). The Puggala-paññatti gives a very broad array of personal descriptors organized in 10 groups, so that the first group is 50 single descriptors, the second group is 26 pairs of descriptors, the third 17 triplets, and so on. Descriptors include "one competent in watchfulness", "one of perturbable nature", "the wrathful and the vengeful", "the jealous and the avaricious", a "member of the elect (arhat)" etc.

=== Mahayana ===
The Buddhist scholar Asanga outlined seven personality types in his Levels of Listeners:

1. One with a strong tendency for desire, the best initial meditation for them is unattractiveness
2. One with a strong tendency for hatred, the best meditation for them is good-will
3. One with a strong tendency for ignorance, the best meditation for them is dependent origination
4. One with a strong tendency for pride, the best meditation for them is 'diversity of the constituents'
5. One with a strong tendency for discursive thoughts, the best meditation for them is breath meditation
6. One who is equally and moderately disposed for all mental afflictions, they may begin with any meditation
7. One with mental afflictions that are not very strong, they may also begin with any meditation

=== Vajrayana ===
Tibetan Buddhism uses the model of the Five Buddha families for describing an individual's personality. Chogyam Trungpa said of this psychological model:

The buddha family or families associated with a person describe his or her fundamental style, that person's intrinsic perspective or stance in perceiving the world and working with it. Each family is associated with both a neurotic and an enlightened style. The neurotic expression of any buddha family can be transmuted into its wisdom or enlightened aspect. As well as describing people's styles, the buddha families are also associated with colors, elements, landscapes, directions, seasons-with any aspect of the phenomenal world.

The five main families are:

- Buddha family, associated with the wisdom of all encompassing space and the defilement of ignorance
- Vajra family, associated with the mirror like wisdom and the defilement of anger
- Ratna (jewel), associated with the wisdom of equanimity and the defilement of pride
- Padma (lotus), associated with the wisdom of discriminating awareness and the defilement of passion
- Karma, associated with all accomplishing wisdom and the defilement of envy/paranoia

== See also ==
- Buddhism and psychology
- Abhidharma
- Personality psychology
