= Mark Epstein (author) =

American author and psychotherapist

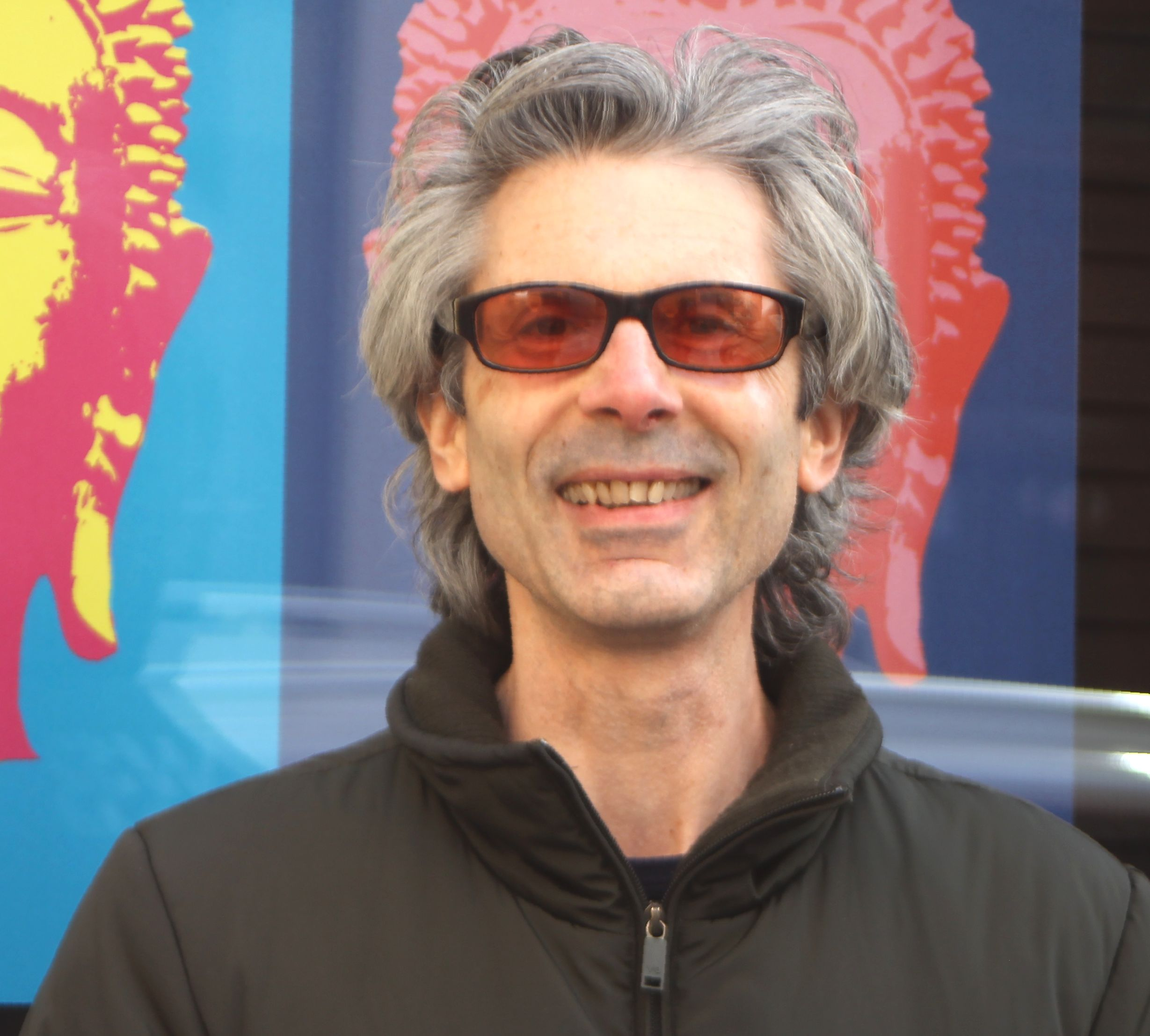
- Epstein in 2012
- Born: 1953 (age 72–73)
- Education: Harvard College; Harvard Medical School
- Occupations: Author; psychotherapist
- Spouse: Arlene Shechet
- Children: 2

Mark Epstein (born 1953) is an American author and psychotherapist who integrates the Buddha's teachings with Sigmund Freud's approaches to trauma. He often writes about the interface of Buddhism and psychotherapy.

== Career ==
=== Psychiatry ===
Epstein is a graduate of Harvard College and Harvard Medical School. After completing his psychiatry residency at what is now New York-Presbyterian Hospital/Weill Cornell Medical Center, he entered the private practice of psychiatry in New York City. He is a clinical assistant professor of psychiatry at New York University School of Medicine. He was interviewed for segments of the PBS documentary The Buddha.

=== Meditation ===
Epstein went to a Buddhist summer camp in Boulder, Colorado, where he met his first Buddhist teachers, Joseph Goldstein and Jack Kornfield. In his early 20s, he traveled to Ajahn Chah's forest Buddhist monastery near Bangkok, Thailand, together with these teachers as well as with Richard Alpert. He has practiced insight meditation since 1974.

He is a contributing editor to Tricycle: The Buddhist Review and his books include Thoughts Without a Thinker and Going to Pieces without Falling Apart. Both books deal with the Eastern teachings of non-self.

== Personal life ==
Epstein is married to the artist Arlene Shechet and has two children.

== Works ==
- 2022 The Zen of Therapy: Uncovering a Hidden Kindness in Life, The Penguin Press, New York, NY., ISBN 978-0593296615
- 2018 Advice Not Given: A Guide to Getting Over Yourself, The Penguin Press, New York, NY.,ISBN 978-0399564321
- 2013 The Trauma of Everyday Life, The Penguin Press, The Penguin Press, New York, NY.,ISBN 978-0143125747
- 2008 Going on Being: Life at the Crossroads of Buddhism and Psychotherapy, Wisdom Publications, Somerville, Mass., ISBN 0-86171-569-1
- 2008 Psychotherapy Without the Self: A Buddhist Perspective, Yale University Press, New Haven, CT, ISBN 0-300-14313-3
- 2005 Open to Desire: The Truth about What the Buddha Taught, Gotham Books, New York, ISBN 1-59240-108-2
- 1998 Going to Pieces Without Falling Apart, Broadway Books, New York, ISBN 0-7679-0235-1
- 1995 Thoughts Without a Thinker: Psychotherapy from a Buddhist Perspective, Basic Books, New York, ISBN 0-465-03931-6
