= Hakomi =

Form of alternative psychotherapy

The Hakomi Method is a psycho-therapeutic approach developed by Ron Kurtz in the 1970s that integrates mindfulness and somatic techniques to address psychological and emotional issues.

== Approach and method ==
According to the Hakomi Institute, the method uses mindfulness, psychotherapy, and somatic interventions to address attachment wounds and developmental trauma. Kurtz's book Body-Centered Psychotherapy outlines five principles of the method, drawn from Eastern spirituality, including mindfulness, nonviolence, organicity, unity, and body-mind holism. Some Hakomi leaders add two more principles: truth and mutability.

The method also draws from systems theory, regarding people as "self-organizing systems", organized psychologically around core memories, beliefs, and images, and claiming this core material expresses itself through habits and attitudes around which people unconsciously organize their behavior. The purported goal of the method is to transform one's way of being in the world through changing core beliefs.

== Related therapies ==
The Hakomi Institute (founded in 1981) describes itself as an international nonprofit that offers training in Hakomi therapy in multiple countries. The institute's programs focus on training psychotherapists and professionals in related fields. Its faculty are primarily professional psychotherapists who incorporate insights from neuroscience and clinical practice into their teaching of the Hakomi Method. The Hakomi Institute is a member of the Association for Humanistic Psychology, the U.S. Association for Body Psychotherapists, and an accredited Continuing Education provider for the National Board for Certified Counselors and the National Association of Social Workers.

Kurtz left the Hakomi Institute in the 1990s to create a new organization, Ron Kurtz Trainings, which offers training for professionals and laypeople.

== Validation ==
The European Association for Psychotherapy recognizes body psychotherapy as a validated branch of psychotherapy; the Hakomi Method is one of the modalities included under this category.

== Sources ==
- Kurtz, Ron (1990). Body-Centered Psychotherapy: The Hakomi Method. LifeRhythm. ISBN 0940795035.
- Johanson, Greg; Ron Kurtz (1991). Grace Unfolding: Psychotherapy in the Spirit of the Tao-te Ching. Bell Tower. ISBN 0517881306.
