= Behavioral ethics =

Field of social scientific research

Behavioral ethics is a field of social scientific research that seeks to understand how individuals behave when confronted with ethical dilemmas. It refers to behavior that is judged within the context of social situations and compared to generally accepted behavioral norms.

Ethics, a subsidiary of philosophy, is defined as the communal understanding of social and normative values in a particular society. Compared to normative ethics, which determines the 'right' or 'wrong' of individual situations, behavioral ethics is more similar to applied ethics, a subdivision dedicated to the more practical and real-world considerations of moral dilemmas.

== History of behavioral ethics ==
The history of behavioral ethics includes the development of scientific research into the psychological foundations of ethical decision-making and behavior. Although the field does not have a precise starting point, its development can be traced through important milestones in psychology, sociology, and related disciplines. Moral philosophy is thus more akin to art or literature that creatively illuminates the human condition without producing the kind of verifiable facts required to support ignoring actual human moral behavior.

The ideology of behavioral ethics given more an emphasis in the middle of the 20th century, when psychologists and social scientists began to study human behavior in ethical dilemmas. Early experiments like the Milgram experiment (1961) and the Stanford prison experiment (1971) shed light on the impact of how situational factors can influence unethical behavior.

The history of behavioral ethics can be interpreted as a journey through the development of understanding of human morality and decision making. It begins with ancient philosophical studies of ethics, where thinkers such as Aristotle considered the nature of virtue and the good life. Over time, as society developed and became more complex, researchers in various fields began to study the psychological bases of ethical behavior. For example, Aristotle asserts in Book II of the Nicomachean Ethics, the man who possesses character excellence will tend to do the right thing, at the right time, and in the right way. Behavioral ethics over time developed models of human morality based upon the fact that morality is an emergent property of the evolutionary dynamic that gave rise to our species. Bravery, and the correct regulation of one's bodily appetites, are examples of character excellence or virtue. So acting bravely and acting temperately are examples of excellent activities.

The moral philosophy of the 18th century philosopher Immanuel Kant, characterized by the principles of rationality, autonomy and universalizability, serves as the cornerstone of the historical trajectory of behavioral ethics. Arguing against the theory of utilitarianism in favor of using a deontological approach such as his most famous ideology, universalizability, Kant's emphasis on these principles provides valuable insight into the psychological foundations of ethical decision-making and behavior and enriches the understanding of human morality in behavioral ethics. According to this view, judgments of right or wrong are determined by the motives of the person acting, not the consequences of their actions.

Furthermore, the emergence of applied ethics in the latter half of the 20th century marked a significant turning point in the field of behavioral ethics. Applied ethics involves the application of ethical principles to real-world issues and dilemmas, such as medical ethics, environmental ethics, and bioethics. This interdisciplinary approach not only extends the theoretical understanding of ethical decision-making but also provides practical frameworks for addressing ethical challenges in various domains of human activity. Scholars and practitioners in applied ethics draw upon insights from behavioral science to develop guidelines, codes of conduct, and decision-making tools aimed at promoting ethical behavior and resolving ethical conflicts in complex societal contexts. Through the integration of empirical research and ethical theory, applied ethics continues to contribute to the ongoing evolution of behavioral ethics as a dynamic and multidisciplinary field.

== Behavioral models ==
Behavioral ethics led to the development of various ethical models and theories.

=== Bystander intervention ===
Bystander intervention describes the phenomenon where ethical behavior is far harder to display because of what is learned from social institutions such as family, school, and religion. Due to this, intervening in an ethically challenging situation requires an individual to go through several steps and failure to complete all means a failure to behave ethically.

=== Rational actor model ===
In the realm of behavioral ethics, the rational actor model serves as a fundamental framework for understanding decision-making. Traditional economic theory often assumes that individuals are rational actors who make decisions by carefully weighing costs and benefits to maximize their own self-interest. However, behavioral ethics suggests that human behavior is influenced by psychological, social, and contextual factors, leading to departures from pure rationality.

Historically, philosophical perspectives on morality have primarily relied on theoretical analysis and introspection, often with minimal consideration of real-life human conduct. Models of human morality advanced by behavioral ethics based on the fact that morality is a new and still developing quality of the evolutionary dynamic that leads to our species.

The rational actor model states that rational people make their decisions based on how much the consequences of said decision will benefit them. This would imply that the individuals will assess all available options, weighing them against their personal objectives, and ultimately selecting the most favorable one. Consistently opting for the best choice contrasts with behavioral ethics, where decisions may be swayed by a broader array of considerations, including moral and ethical principles.

Moreover, the rational actor model's focus on rationality as the primary factor shaping human decision-making fails to recognize the complexities of moral behavior. Studies in behavioral ethics have revealed that individuals frequently display systematic departures from rationality, such as framing effects and overconfidence biases, which can profoundly impact moral decision-making and behavior.

Socio-cultural factors, including social norms and group dynamics, significantly influence moral behavior, underscoring the limitations of solely individualistic and rational perspectives. By recognizing these intricacies and integrating findings from behavioral science, behavioral ethics provides a more nuanced comprehension of human morality, overcoming the limitations of the rational actor model's assumptions. This holistic approach considers how social contexts, psychological biases, and emotional responses intertwine to shape ethical decision-making.

== Thought experiments ==
=== The trolley problem ===
The trolley problem, first introduced in 1967 by Philippa Foot, is a classic ethical dilemma. In the problem, there is a runaway trolley headed straight for five people who are restrained and unable to move, however, you have the option to pull a lever and divert the trolley to another track where there is only one restrained individual. The ethically 'correct' decision would be to pull the lever killing one individual and saving the five, as the lives of five would outweigh the life of one.

However, when viewing the trolley problem through the lens of behavioral ethics, it becomes more difficult to make an ethically 'correct' decision. Variations of the original problem have been proposed, leading to more blame or guilt being placed on the decision-maker, causing individuals to deviate from the expected response of pulling the lever. One example of this is Frank Chapman Sharp's version of the trolley problem (1905), where the railway's switchman controls the lever and the single restrained individual is the switchman's child.

=== The prisoner's dilemma ===
The prisoner's dilemma, while not necessarily an ethical dilemma, but a game theory thought experiment, can still be viewed using behavioral ethics. It features two prisoners who can each either testify or stay silent. If one of the prisoners testifies, the other is arrested and given a long sentence. If neither testify, they are both given a shorter sentence, and if they both testify, they are both arrested and given a medium sentence. Both prisoners are unable to speak or communicate in any way with the other. While the most correct decision would be for both prisoners to stay silent to receive the shortest sentence, fear of the other prisoner testifying typically leads to both prisoners testifying and both receiving the medium sentence.

The trolley problem and the prisoner's dilemma both place individuals in decision-making situations that carry ethical questions. In each, an individual is asked to make a decision that affects another person. In the prisoner's dilemma, the principles of reciprocity and cooperation come into play, but not all who participate behave in the same manner. In the trolley problem an individual has to choose which group of people to save. Both of these experiments shed light on how people behave when confronted with ethical dilemmas.

Sometimes, the small details get missed in strict research. For instance, there was a study in 2008 that said students were less likely to cheat after thinking about moral rules like the Ten Commandments. Based on this, some people suggested using moral reminders to stop cheating. But when another study tried to repeat the same thing later on, they didn't get the same results. This teaches us that things can be more complicated than they seem, even if they're well-known findings.

== Behavioral ethics in practice ==
=== Education ===
In ethics teaching and research, ethics is arguably the "next big thing" because its investigation agenda has generated knowledge on why and how people choose and act when being confronted with ethical subject, which was unknown previously. Based on the extant body of ethics course books and course plans from fields such as medicine, teaching, accounting, and journalism, "moral reasoning" - along with associated skills - is often an established objective. Behavioral ethics, however, is distinguished from the concept of moral reasoning because ethical behavior is primarily driven by a diverse set of intuitive processes over which individuals have little conscious control. Within education it is important to ensure ethics are taken into consideration. Ethical conduct in teaching is a vital factor in making sure students are taught fairly. An individual's "preconceived notions and opinions can emerge through our language choice, teaching methods, grading practices, and accessibility practices and it can have a tremendous impact on our students' learning and connection to school". Biases can influence actions and perceptions of students therefore teaching should be free of bias. Behavioral ethics calls for a model of ethics in education that focuses not on directly modeling good ethical reasoning but on the way people think clearly and impartially about ethical problems.

=== Behavioral law and economics ===
Clarifying the difference between behavioral law and economics (BLE) and behavioral ethics (BE) is of importance. Compared to BLE, BE has reduced its ability of influencing broad legal academic circles. In addition, unlike BLE, BE was advanced as piece of the management literature, which is less related to legal scholarship than BLE is, and thus less likely to have impact on it. In terms of law, behavioral ethics plays an important role in ensuring social order. According to studies conducted by Simon Gachter, there are very interesting conclusions that can be drawn regarding conditional cooperation. "Conditional cooperation is the tendency of individuals to engage in cooperation depending on the degree of cooperation of other individuals, and is argued to be one of the main sources of high contributions in social dilemmas". Gachter's figure 3 is a great example of how delicate the concept of social order is. "Several psychological mechanisms support conditional cooperation. Conditional cooperation is a likely pattern of behavior because various psychological mechanisms predict it". When it comes to ethics and economics, behavioral economics allows an intersection between the philosophical foundation of behavior as well as the complexity of economics.

=== Justice ===
Behavioral ethics offers a perspective on the field of justice, exploring how individuals' moral decision-making processes intersect with legal and ethical frameworks. In the context of justice, behavioral ethics highlights the psychological, social, and cognitive factors that influence how individuals perceive fairness, make ethical judgments, and behave within legal systems.

One key aspect of behavioral ethics in justice is the recognition of cognitive biases that can shape individuals' perceptions of fairness and influence their decision-making. For example, research has shown that individuals may exhibit biases such as the fairness heuristic bias, where they rely on superficial cues to judge the fairness of a situation, rather than considering objective criteria. These biases can impact how individuals perceive legal proceedings, sentencing decisions, and the outcomes of judicial processes.

Behavioral ethics researchers have delved into the correlation between employees' perceptions of justice and their engagement in ethical or unethical conduct. Since the 1990s, organizational justice has emerged as a prominent area of study within organizational psychology. Coined by Jerald Greenberg in 1987, organizational justice encompasses employees' perceptions of the fairness of organizational events, policies, and practices. This concept has been further amplified through influential research on distributive, procedural, and interactional justice, focusing on both theoretical advancements and empirical investigations into the formation and consequences of these justice perceptions.

The exploration of justice perceptions has yielded insights into their profound impact on various employee attitudes and behaviors. Positive correlations have been observed between perceptions of justice and factors such as trust, job satisfaction, and organizational commitment. Conversely, perceptions of injustice have been associated with detrimental outcomes, including increased turnover rates and engagement in counterproductive behaviors such as theft and unethical conduct, which unfortunately are not uncommon occurrences within organizational settings.

By integrating insights from behavioral ethics into discussions of justice, policymakers, legal professionals, and scholars can gain a deeper understanding of the psychological and social dynamics that influence legal decision-making and behavior. This understanding can inform efforts to promote fairness, equity, and ethical conduct within legal systems, ultimately contributing to the realization of justice for all individuals within society.

=== Public health ===
Behavior ethics in public health emphasizes the importance of thoroughly evaluating the ethics of policies aimed at encouraging healthy behavior change. It suggests three key considerations: valuing well-being alongside physical health, ensuring equitable distribution of health benefits, and monitoring for unintended consequences. By prioritizing these aspects, we can create policies that genuinely enhance overall health and well-being for everyone.

Some health policies designed to encourage healthy behaviors might not always have a positive impact. They may cause unintended harm and unfairjess, especially if they mainly benefit people who are already healthy. It's important for those making decisions about public health to consider these factors and use clear guidelines to ensure that their policies are fair and truly beneficial for everyone.

=== Medicine ===
Researchers in behavioral ethics have identified the healthcare sector as particularly susceptible to the influence of healthcare providers on individuals' decisions. Researchers in ethical behavior emphasize the responsibility of physicians and medical practitioners to clearly communicate with patients about their condition and treatment options, without bias. Failure to do so can lead patients to make decisions based on skewed information resulting in undesired outcomes. Informed consent, which entails providing patients with unbiased information about their condition and treatment options, plays a crucial role in guiding patients' choices. An individual may feel pressured or forced by a physician to undergo a specific treatment that they might not feel comfortable undertaking for religious or personal reasons.

Additionally, behavioral ethics in healthcare extends to the allocation and development of essential resources. Clinical trials for new medicines and vaccines often involve participants from disadvantaged backgrounds particularly from poor and developing countries, who may feel compelled to participate for financial reasons. This exploitation of vulnerable individuals raises significant ethical concerns within the field.

Similarly, the distribution of medical resources to impoverished regions raises ethical dilemmas. Limited resources force relief organizations to prioritize recipients, leading to debates over who receives life-saving aid. Ethical researchers characterize this situation as a crisis, as it involves choosing which individuals will receive vital resources and which will not.

=== Business ===
If firms are able to utilize the principles of behavioral psychology to alter consumer's behavior and thus increase sales and governments can change people's behavior and hence promote policy target using those same principles, then individuals and their employers can apply related principles of behavioral ethics to promote ethical behavior in the company and in society.

At most business conference, employees are required to report on the progress of their missions. It can lead to an ethical dilemma because they may report their performance better than it is due to external pressure.

Reporting progress, employees are typically asked to create reports on their progress/success they have had. As simple as this request is, it can cause an ethical problem if not respected. Employees need to ensure they are giving correct information, not only to protect the integrity of the company but to ensure their coworkers/managers have correct information. Maintaining correct reports.

In the workplace, ethical and unethical behavior has a major impact on the culture of the company. It is important to have company-wide appreciation for principles such as honesty, transparency, and integrity. These are critical traits that an ethically behaving employee should have, as it highly reflects on the personal integrity of an individual and overall the company.

== Unethical behavior ==
Unethical behavior is an action that falls outside of what is thought morally appropriate for a person, a job or a company. Many experts would define unethical behavior as any harmful action or sequence of actions that would violate the moral normality's of the entire community within the appropriate actions. Individuals can act unethically, as can businesses, professionals and politicians.

Research results have further shown "that people low in moral character are likely to eventually dominate cheating-enabling environments, where they then cheat extensively".

Unethical behavior in the workplace is a very important and consequential issue that has the ability to decrease employee morale and productivity of the individual, group, or company in many organizations. Some examples of unethical behavior could be gossiping about a colleague behind their back, taking time off work by lying about a sickness, work hours or time sheet manipulation, and even just taking care of one's own personal work or business on work time.

Why does unethical behavior typically occur? There may be too much pressure to succeed, and individuals may turn to unethical actions to attain unrealistic expectations or goals. Individuals could also be afraid to speak up. There could also be a lack of training from one's organization. There could even be no policy for reporting so one would ever know that this behavior has even been occurring. Or managers could just be setting a bad example and with a bad leader will come bad workers.

=== Unethical behavior in business ===
Unethical behavior in a business context covers actions that do not obey the acceptable criterion of business operations beyond simply legal requirements, but morally accepted ones.

Unethical behavior can be intended to benefit solely the perpetrator, or the entire business organization. Regardless, participating in unethical behavior can lead to negative morale and an overall negative work culture.

Examples of unethical behavior in business and environment can include:

1. Deliberate deception
2. Violation of conscience
3. Failure to honor commitments
4. Unlawful conduct
5. Disregard of company policy

==== Yahoo! ====
Scott Thompson the former CEO of Yahoo!, was accused and found guilty of embellishing his resume. He claimed to have a degree in both Accounting and Computer Science when he only received a degree in Accounting. CEOs have significantly higher ethical standards to maintain and resultingly, Thompson was quickly replaced by Ross Levinsohn on an interim basis.

==== Apple ====
Apple was accused of equipping iPhones with batteries that over time would purposely deteriorate. This would cause sales of iPhones to increase by millions each year. When Apple was first accused of this ethical issue they initially ignored it before denying the claims. Once Apple lost, they agreed to pay up to $113 million to settle claims.

==== General Motors ====
General Motors was forced to recall more than 3 million cars that they released to the public for ignition issues in 2014. The issue with their specific scenario was that employees in the company were found to know about the issues, or what may cause these issues since 2005. The violation was not taken seriously by executives until customers began to complain.

=== Unethical behavior in public health ===
Researchers and managers are two separate groups within the pharmaceutical company that need awareness of their unethical behavior. For researchers, their misconduct is changing their main focus of a trial after it is done for the reason that they didn't find the answer to their hypothesis, as well as being able to find other positive outcomes of the trial that they present in the report instead.

=== Unethical behavior in justice ===
Unethical behavior within the context of justice encompasses a wide range of actions that contravene moral principles or legal norms, often resulting in harm or injustice to others. Despite the overarching goal of justice to uphold fairness and equity, unethical behavior can manifest in various forms within legal systems, challenging the integrity and effectiveness in the pursuit of justice.

One example of unethical behavior in the realm of justice is corruption, where individuals abuse their positions of power or authority for personal gain or advantage. This can include bribery, embezzlement, or extortion, all of which undermine the impartiality and legitimacy of legal institutions and erode public trust in the fairness of the justice system.

Another example is the abuse of discretion by legal professionals, such as judges or prosecutors, who may engage in biased decision-making or selective enforcement of laws based on personal prejudices or external influences. This can lead to unequal treatment under the law and perpetuate systemic injustices, particularly for marginalized or vulnerable populations.

Unethical behavior can occur within legal organizations themselves, such as lawyers engaging in unethical practices, such as conflicts of interest, or within law enforcement agencies where officers may engage in misconduct, such as evidence tampering or abuse of power.

Addressing unethical behavior within the justice system requires a varied approach that includes promoting ethical awareness and accountability among legal professionals, implementing effective oversight mechanisms to prevent and detect misconduct, and fostering a culture of integrity and transparency within legal institutions. By upholding ethical standards and ensuring the impartial and equitable administration of justice, society can uphold the fundamental principles of fairness, equality, and the rule of law.

=== Unethical behavior through the rational actor model ===
Unethical behavior in practice often stems from the idealized assumptions of the rational actor model, which assumes that individuals make decisions based on rational decisions to maximize their self-interest. Despite the model's premise, real-world behaviors frequently demonstrate departures from rationality due to various cognitive, social, and emotional factors.

Cognitive biases, such as overconfidence bias or framing effects, can distort individuals' perceptions of ethicality and lead them to justify unethical behavior. Social factors, such as peer pressure or organizational culture, can also play a significant role in promoting or condoning unethical conduct, even among individuals who may otherwise prioritize ethical considerations.

Moreover, emotional factors, such as fear, greed, or anger, can cloud individuals' judgment and lead them to prioritize short-term gains over long-term ethical considerations. In some cases, individuals may engage in unethical behavior due to a sense of moral disengagement, where they mentally distance themselves from the consequences of their actions or rationalize their behavior through cognitive distortions.

Overall, while the rational actor model provides a theoretical framework for understanding decision-making, it often fails to capture the complexities of human behavior, particularly in the realm of ethics. Unethical behavior in practice highlights the need for a more nuanced understanding of decision-making processes, one that considers the interplay of cognitive, social, and emotional factors in shaping individuals' ethical judgments and actions.
