= Marsha M. Linehan =

American psychologist (1943–2026)

- Linehan in 1968
- Born: May 5, 1943; Tulsa, Oklahoma, U.S.
- Died: November 10, 2026 (aged 83); Seattle, Washington, U.S.
- Education: Loyola University Chicago (BSc, MA, PhD)
- Occupations: Creator of dialectical behavior therapy, psychologist, academic, author
- Children: 1
- Website: depts.washington.edu/uwbrtc/our-team/marsha-linehan/

Marsha Marie Linehan (May 5, 1943 – November 10, 2026) was an American psychologist, academic and author. She created dialectical behavior therapy (DBT), an evidence-based psychotherapy that combines cognitive restructuring with acceptance, mindfulness, and shaping. Linehan's development of DBT was a major advancement in the field of psychology, effective at treating clients who were not improving with the existing methods at the time. This unlocked new means of treating people with chronic suicidality and borderline personality disorder (BPD) and has since been shown to be helpful to people with other disorders.

Linehan was a professor of psychology at the University of Washington in Seattle and Director of the Behavioral Research and Therapy Clinics. Her primary research was in the development of DBT and its use for treating borderline personality disorder, the application of behavioral models to suicidal behaviors, and drug abuse. Linehan also authored books including two treatment manuals and a memoir. She also founded Behavioral Tech LLC, which trains mental health professionals in Dialectical Behavior Therapy (DBT), and co-founded the DBT-Linehan Board of Certification (DBT-LBC) to identify providers offering evidence-based DBT. Linehan was also trained in spiritual direction and served as an associate Zen teacher in both the Sanbo-Kyodan School in Germany and the Diamond Sangha in the U.S.

Allen Frances, in the foreword for Linehan's memoir Building a Life Worth Living, said Linehan is one of the two most influential "clinical innovators" in mental health, the other being Aaron Beck.

== Early life and education ==
Marsha Marie Linehan was born on May 5, 1943, in Tulsa, Oklahoma, the third of six children. Her father worked as a vice president at Sunoco Oil, and her Cajun mother was deeply involved in church and volunteer activities. Both parents were described as image-conscious, creating an environment in which Linehan often felt invalidated. Although she believed her family loved her, she felt that love was not well expressed. She recalled feeling out of place and said her mother made efforts to change her to help her better fit in.

Linehan attended Catholic school and considered herself popular among her peers. She joined a high school sorority that had made her feel validated, but later left believing she needed to make a sacrifice. Her mental health declined, leading to worsening depression and persistent headaches. Just weeks before her high school graduation, she was hospitalized at the Institute of Living in Hartford, Connecticut, where she was diagnosed with schizophrenia and admitted as an inpatient. Linehan began cutting herself, was subjected to electroconvulsive therapy, long periods of seclusion, extreme cold pack therapy, as well as Thorazine and Librium as treatment. Linehan described the experience as extremely painful, stating:

I know what hell feels like, but even now I can’t find words to describe it. Every word that comes to mind is so utterly inadequate to describe how terrible hell is. Even saying it is terrible communicates nothing about the experience. When I reflect on my life, I often realize that there is no amount of happiness in the universe that could ever balance the searing, excruciating emotional pain I experienced those many years ago.

During her more than two-year stay at the institute, she engaged in suicidal behavior and although she was given a diagnosis of schizophrenia, she said in later years that she felt that she actually had had borderline personality disorder. The symptoms she experienced then are similar to today's diagnostic criteria for borderline personality disorder. At 20, Linehan left the Institute returning to Tulsa after having a pattern of suicidal behavior broken by her doctor. Linehan expressed a commitment to helping others stating:

The day when I was sitting in the piano room by myself, a lonely soul in the midst of other lonely souls in the unit, I am not sure what made me do what I did next. Whatever it was, there and then I made a vow to God that I would get myself out of hell and that, once I did, I would go back into hell and get others out. That vow has guided and controlled most of my life since then.

When she returned home to Tulsa at age 20, she reported significant memory loss from her time at the institute. Life back at her parents' home was strained, and her self-harming behaviors continued. She eventually moved into a YWCA in downtown Tulsa, where she later attempted suicide twice. Determined to move forward, she enrolled in night school at the University of Tulsa, focusing her studies on suicide, and worked as a mail girl and receptionist with aspirations of becoming a psychiatrist. After discovering that a man she had been dating was married, she relocated to Chicago to live near her supportive brother, Earl.

In Chicago, Linehan learned that a friend of her father had created a college trust fund for her. Linehan began studies at the Jesuit university Loyola University Chicago. She found community within Catholic groups, studied in hotel lobbies, rode the L, and often spoke with the university chaplain. She joined the lay religious taking a vow of poverty and volunteered with Little Brothers of the Poor.

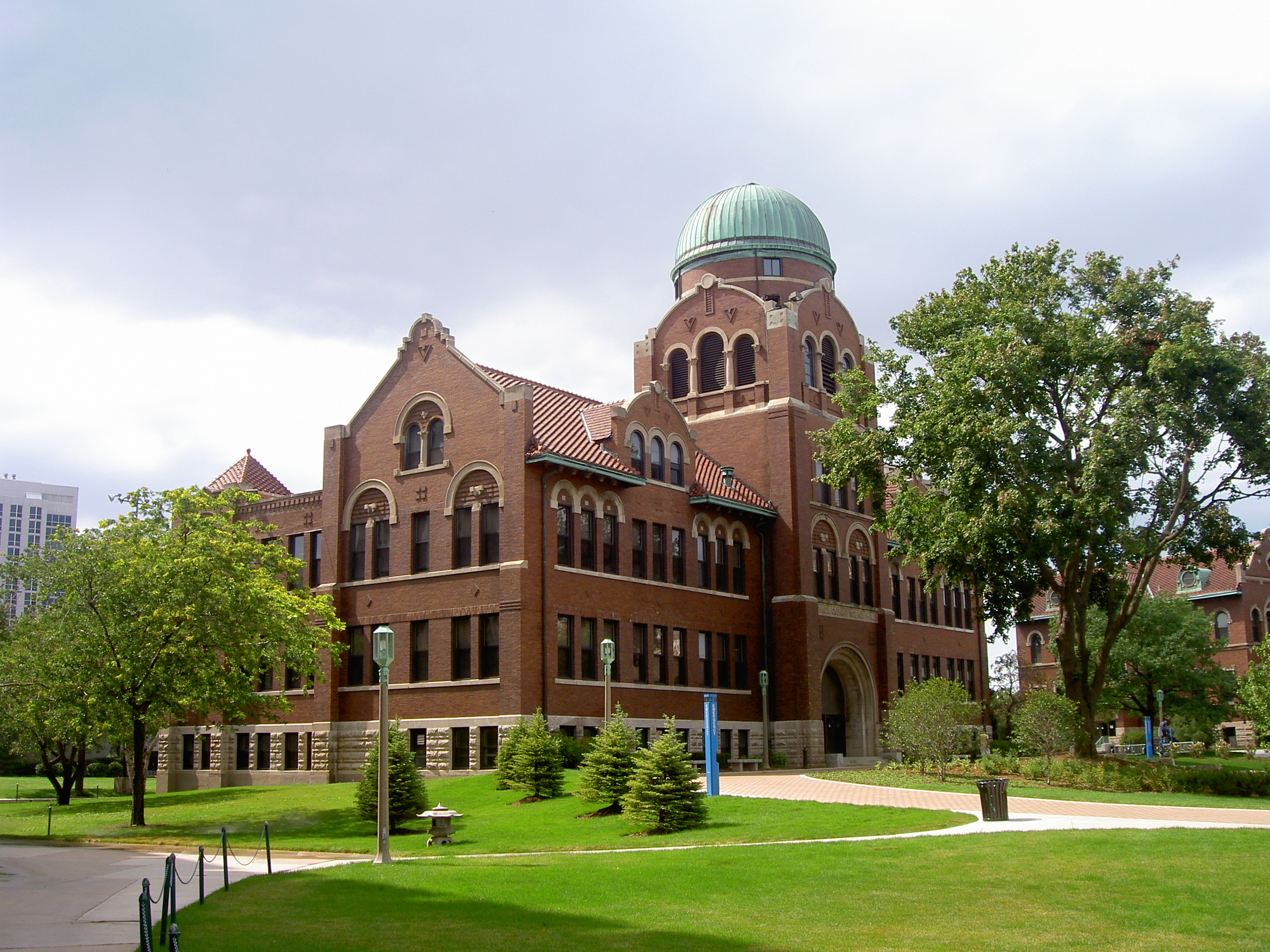
Loyola University Chicago

Linehan graduated cum laude from Loyola University Chicago in 1968 with a B.Sc. in psychology. When Linehan struggled financially, she was assisted by Loyola faculty and found work within the university to complete her education. Realizing that psychiatry lacked effective treatments for the kind of patients she wanted to help, she pursued graduate studies in psychology with the assistance of Loyola faculty. While at Loyola, she supported liberation theology, opposed the Vietnam War, and engaged with socially active Jesuits. She earned an M.A. in 1970 and a Ph.D. in 1971, both in psychology with clinical training, at Loyola University Chicago. During her time at Loyola, Linehan also served as a lecturer in the psychology department.

== Career ==
=== Early career ===
After graduating from Loyola University, Linehan completed a doctoral internship at The Suicide Prevention and Crisis Service in Buffalo, New York, between 1971 and 1972. During this time, Linehan served as an adjunct assistant professor at University at Buffalo, The State University of New York. From Buffalo, Linehan completed a postdoctoral fellowship in behavior modification at Stony Brook University. Linehan then returned to her alma mater, Loyola University in 1973 and served as an adjunct professor at the university until 1975. During this same time, Linehan also served as an assistant professor in psychology at the Catholic University of America in Washington, D.C., from 1973 to 1977 where she developed course work on suicide. At Catholic, Linehan felt she did not fit in well with the faculty and, remembering her vow of poverty, moved to a small apartment. To find community, she regularly rode her bike to the Newman Center.

=== Development of DBT ===
In 1977, Linehan was recruited to a position at the University of Washington as an adjunct assistant professor in the psychology and behavior sciences department. Linehan moved several times, searching for an integrated neighborhood and a dwelling that would fit her vow of poverty, remembering Saint Therese. After students were intimidated by her work with a patient on parole for murder, Linehan purchased a nicer more permanent home but required it to have a space where she could allow poorer people to live.

Linehan began visiting the Kairos House of Prayer to practice silence, but became depressed. She also began visiting the Shalem Institute where she decided to break with the Catholic Church as an institution, stopped believing in a personal God, and stopped attending mass which she considered one of the biggest losses of her life. At the Shalem Institute, she returned to an understanding that God is love and in everything. Also at Shalem, she improved her understanding, willingness, opening oneself up to whatever is, becoming one with the universe, participating in it, and doing what needs done in the moment.

She received a research grant from the National Institute of Health and began working with hospitals on suicidal patients. Because the grant required working with people with a formal diagnosis, Linehan developed the study around borderline personality disorder. Linehan and her team would watch therapy sessions and determine which procedures to keep and which to drop based on evidence. Many actions were tested, and the focus on acceptance and distress tolerance was considered new therapy method.

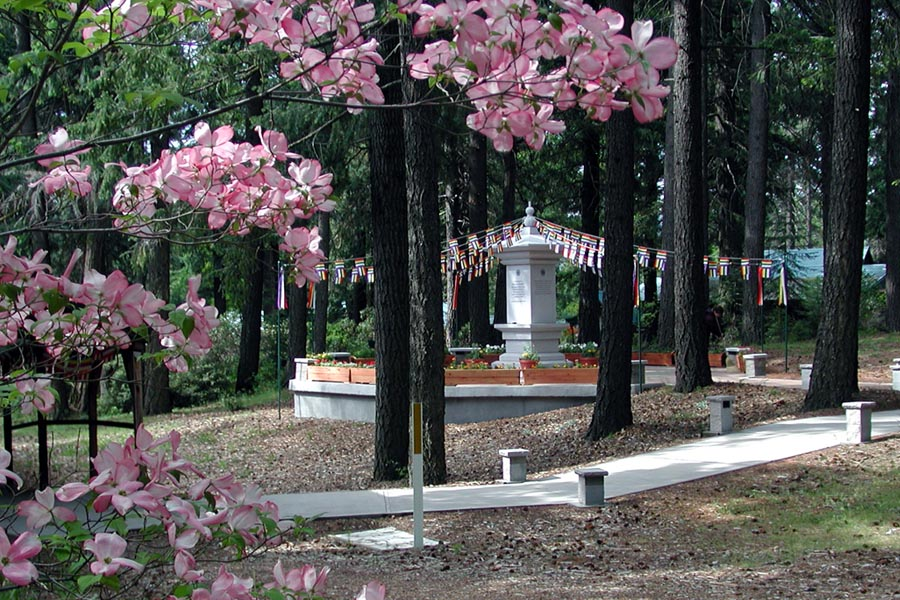
Shasta Abbey

Linehan began spending time at the Shasta Abbey, a Buddhist monastery where she developed ideas on practice and acceptance and then to German Catholic Zen teacher Willigis Jäger where she furthered her sense of community and understanding of acceptance concepts. Linehan began to reject analysis in the search for meaning and began to focus on not searching for meaning but realizing everything just is. Linehan invited a roshi to work with her students and developed a training manual for the core skills of DBT which she described as "psychological and behavioral translations of meditation practices from eastern spiritual training", of which the core skills are mindfulness. Linehan used this for the development of the term "wise mind". Linehan felt that to achieve meaningful and happy lives, people must learn to accept things as they are through radical acceptance. Linehan also felt that change is necessary for growth and happiness stating

DBT skills fall into four categories [mindfulness, distress tolerance, emotion regulation, and interpersonal effectiveness], each of which is designed to solve different set of problems. The first two offer the path to acceptance of reality as it is, while the last two, taken together, are change skills that help clients embrace the changes they need to make in their lives.

Linehan used her methods with clients and developed a clinical trial to test effectiveness with one group of borderline and suicidal patients receiving DBT and the other receiving standard therapy. DBT uses a multitude of skills under the categories of mindfulness skills, distress tolerance skills, emotion regulation skills, and interpersonal effectiveness skills. The trial found that patients who received DBT were less likely to hurt themselves and more likely to stay in therapy. After multiple attempts to publish her research were rejected, she was eventually successful in publishing her research in Archives of General Psychology in 1991. Prior to Linehan's publication on DBT in 1991, there was no effective therapy for her population of high-risk clients she diagnosed with borderline personality disorder with Linehan stating:

[The development of DBT] involved much trial and error, false starts, unexpected insights, and lucky breaks as the many different components of the treatment steadily coalesced into a coherent therapy. Ultimately, I was able to conduct a strictly controlled clinical trial that demonstrated that DBT is effective in helping highly suicidal people live lives experienced as worth living, the results of which I published in 1991. Until this point there had been no effective therapy for this population; now there was.

Linehan then spent many years facing critics, including that she was "just a teacher" and that teaching skills is not therapy. Linehan and many new researchers expanded work on DBT, solidifying it as an effective form of therapy.

=== Later career ===
Linehan was a professor of psychology and a professor of Psychiatry and Behavioral Sciences at the University of Washington and Director of the Behavioral Research and Therapy Clinics until her retirement in 2019. She founded the Suicide Strategic Planning Group, the DBT Strategic Planning Group, Behavioral Tech LLC and Behavioral Tech Research Inc.

Linehan was the president of the Association for the Advancement of Behavior Therapy as well as of the Society of Clinical Psychology Division 12 American Psychological Association, a fellow of both the American Psychological Association and the American Psychopathological Association and a diplomate of the American Board of Behavioral Psychology.

In addition to her work in psychology, Linehan was trained in Zen meditation and became a Zen teacher giving students the four vows of the Bodhisattva. The mindfulness skills within Zen were incorporated into DBT research and practice.

== Personal life and death ==
Linehan was unmarried and lived with her adult adopted Peruvian daughter Geraldine "Geri" and her son-in-law Nate in Seattle. Linehan was a long-time Roman Catholic until her break with the Church citing its patriarchy. Linehan was taught meditation by Roman Catholic priest and Zen teacher Willigis Jäger and Buddhist Soto Zen under Roshi Jiyu-Kennett. (Note: According to Kabat-Zinn (Coming to Our Senses, 2005, p. 431): "Marsha [Linehan] herself is a long-time practitioner of Zen, and DBT incorporates the spirit and principles of mindfulness and whatever degree of formal practice is possible.") She was also trained in spiritual direction and served as an associate Zen teacher in both the Sanbo-Kyodan School in Germany and the Diamond Sangha in the U.S.

Linehan died of complications of pneumonia in Seattle on November 10, 2026, at the age of 83.

== Honors and awards ==
Linehan was honored with numerous awards for her clinical and research work focused on suicidal behavior. These include the Louis Israel Dublin Award for Lifetime Achievement in the Field of Suicide, the Distinguished Research in Suicide Award from the American Foundation for Suicide Prevention, and the establishment of the Marsha Linehan Award for Outstanding Research in the Treatment of Suicidal Behavior by the American Association of Suicidology. Her contributions to clinical research were further recognized with the Distinguished Scientist Award from the Society for a Science of Clinical Psychology, the Distinguished Scientific Contributions to Clinical Psychology Award from the Society of Clinical Psychology, as well as awards for Distinguished Contributions to the Practice of Psychology from the American Association of Applied and Preventive Psychology, and for Distinguished Contributions to Clinical Activities from the Association for the Advancement of Behavior Therapy.

== Book publications ==
Linehan authored and co-authored many books, including two treatment manuals: Cognitive-Behavioral Treatment for Borderline Personality Disorder and Skills Training Manual for Treating Borderline Personality Disorder. She published a memoir about her life and the creation of dialectical behavior therapy Building a Life Worth Living: A Memoir in 2020. She has also published extensively in scientific journals, some of which include research on suicidal behavior such as the article "Modeling the suicidal behavior cycle: Understanding repeated suicide attempts among individuals with borderline personality disorder and a history of attempting suicide" while others contribute to her work on DBT like, "Behavioral assessment in DBT: Commentary on the special series".

=== Selected book publications ===
- Building a Life Worth Living: A Memoir. New York: Random House Publishing Group. 2021. ISBN 978-0-8129-8499-6. OL 32487139M.
- DBT skills training handouts and worksheets (2015)
- DBT skills training manual (2015)
- Opposite actions: changing emotions you want to change (2007)
- Understanding borderline personality disorder: the dialectical approach (1995)
- Cognitive-behavioral Treatment of Borderline Personality Disorder. Guilford Press. 1993. ISBN 978-0-89862-183-9. OL 1411643M.
- Skills training manual for treating borderline personality disorder (1993)

== See also ==
- Behaviorism
- Buddhism and psychology
- Behavioral therapy
- Cognitive behavioral therapy
