= Clive Sherlock =

British doctor

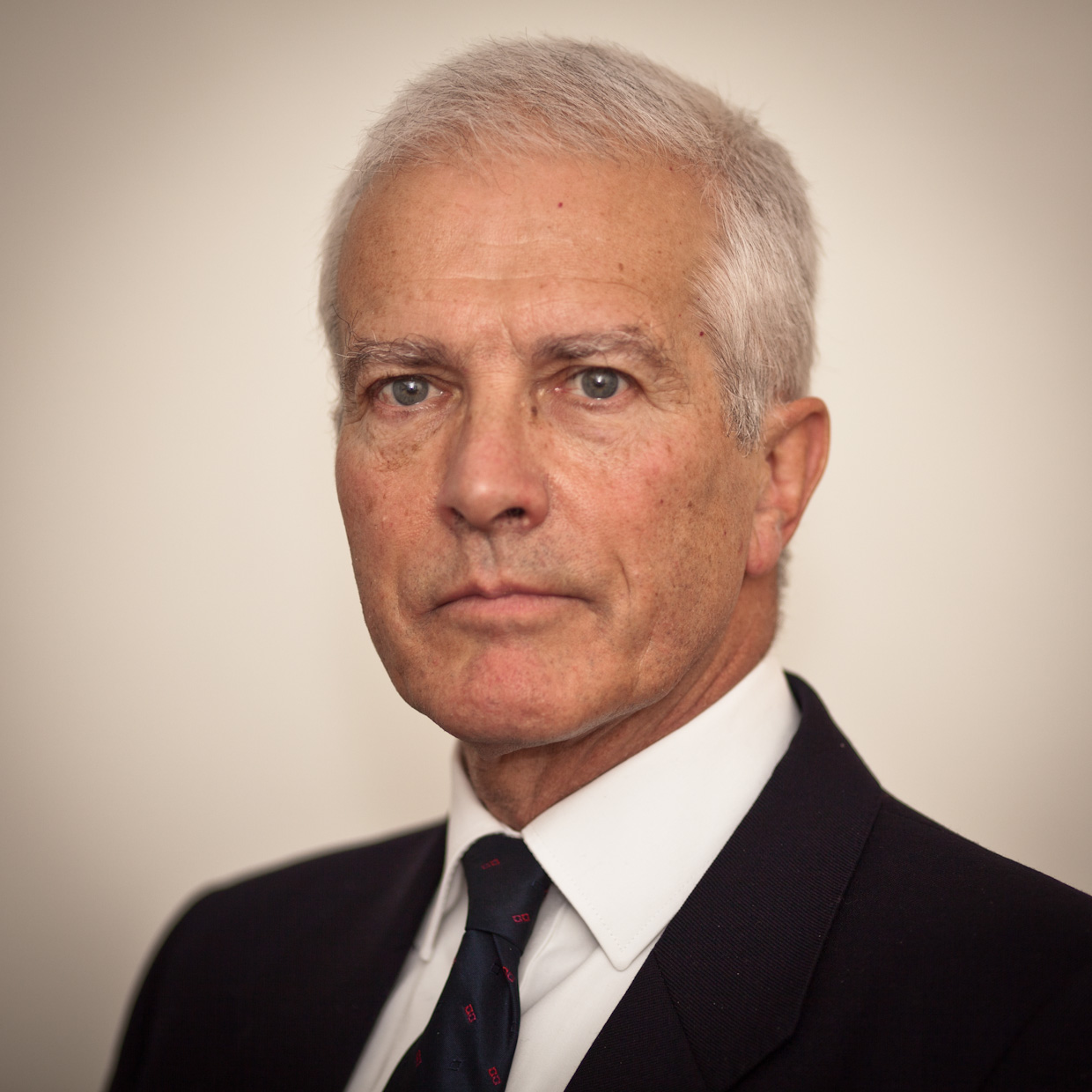
Clive Sherlock, 2011

Clive Reginald Francis Sherlock (commonly known as Clive Sherlock) is a British medical professional.

He has advocated for a medical approach which he calls "Adaptation Practice". In 1999, The Times published a feature article on Adaptation Practice, and other descriptions of his approach have appeared in the Guardian and the Oxford Mail.

== Publications ==
- Sherlock, Clive & John, Chris (2016). "Adaptation Practice: Teaching doctors how to cope with stress, anxiety and depression by developing resilience". British Journal of Medical Practitioners. 9 (2).
- A New Psychological Model of the Psyche with Special Relevance to Depression, Anxiety, Anger, and Stress by Clive Sherlock: presented at the 4th International Conference on Philosophy and Psychiatry in Florence August 2000.
- Riffert, Franz; Weber, Michel (2003). "The Universality of Impermanence". Searching for New Contrasts (PDF). Frankfurt am Main: Peter Lang. pp. 231–242. ISBN 978-3-631-39089-4.
- Derfer, George; et al. (2009). "On Zen Buddhism". The Roar of Awakening. Heusestamm: ontos verlag. pp. 225–236. ISBN 978-3-86838-039-2.
- "The Four Nobel Truths". The Middle Way. 3. 71: 160–165. November 1996.
- "Three Refuges, Signs of Being and Fires". The Middle Way. 4. 71: 229–239. February 1997.
- "Dharmas, Dhatus, Skandhas". The Middle Way. 3. 72: 131–141. November 1997.
- "Transformation Through Practice". The Middle Way. 1. 72: 21–29. May 1997.
- "The Wheel of Birth ad Death". The Middle Way. 1. 73: 23–30. May 1998.
- "Karma and Rebirth". The Middle Way. 2. 73: 81–86. August 1998.
