= Other-centred therapy =

Other-centred therapy is a particular approach used in psychotherapy and other therapeutic fields which is grounded in Buddhist psychology principles. The approach addresses the relationship between the self and the world through an investigation of perception, its conditioned nature and the possibility for change.

== Background ==
The Buddhist understanding of conditioned nature of the ordinary mind provides a model of human process which is cyclical and based on distorted perception. Since all Buddhist teachings can be linked through this model, details found in different teachings can be used to elaborate and clarify aspects of it.

This Buddhist understanding of mind can be used in practical ways to create interventions which will facilitate psychological change in therapeutic and other contexts. The teachings of the Skandhas and Dependent origination describe a cycle of perception and attachment and examining the stages in this cycle suggest a number of different possibilities for therapeutic intervention.

Other-centred approaches tend to focus on those interventions which relate to aspects of the cycle of human process which are connected to the world view. These are more amenable to change than those parts with which the person identifies. People are more willing to question their perception of others than their sense of self.

Other centred models include developing clearer views of the other and moving beyond conditioned, self-invested interest. They include methods such as Naikan. This approach is being developed on the Tariki Psychotherapy Training Programme. The model can also be linked to mindfulness based approaches, particularly where these are interpreted in the light of the Satipatthana sutta in the overall context of Buddhist teachings.
