= Vidyamala Burch =

Mindfulness teacher

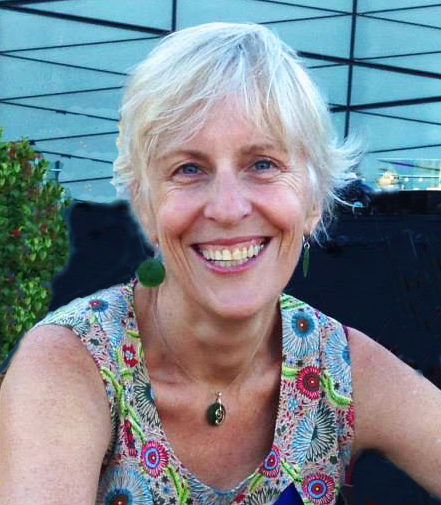
- Born: 1959 (age 66–67); Wellington, New Zealand
- Known for: Founder of Mindfulness-Based Pain Management; Founder of Breathworks
- Notable work: Living Well with Pain and Illness; Mindfulness for Health; Mindfulness for Women

Prudence Margaret Burch OBE (born 1959), known professionally as Vidyamala Burch, is a mindfulness teacher, writer, and co-founder of Breathworks, an international mindfulness organization known particularly for developing mindfulness-based pain management (MBPM). The British Pain Society has recognized her "outstanding contribution to the alleviation of pain", and in 2019, 2020, 2021 and 2022 she was named on the Shaw Trust Power 100 list of the most influential disabled people in the UK. Burch's book Mindfulness for Health won the British Medical Association's 2014 Medical Books Award in the Popular Medicine category.

== Early life ==
Born Prudence Burch in Wellington, New Zealand in 1959, Burch enjoyed walking and mountaineering as a child and teenager, especially in New Zealand's Southern Alps. At the age of 16, she fractured a vertebra in her spine while lifting someone from a swimming pool, and due to a congenital spine condition suffered severe long-term consequences. Within six months she required major surgery, which itself caused complications requiring further surgery. Burch's life "changed overnight", and ever since she has experienced chronic back pain and varying levels of disability. At the age of 23 Burch was involved in a major car accident which fractured another of her vertebrae, significantly worsening her pain and debility. After working for two years as a film and sound editor (including for Vincent Ward's film Vigil), Burch's health suffered a complete collapse, and in 1985 she was hospitalized in an intensive care ward.

During her time in hospital, Burch had a number of experiences that profoundly shaped her future life. The most important, which she has described as "the axis on which my life has turned", occurred after having a procedure after which she was required to sit upright for 24 hours to avoid complications, causing her almost unbearable pain. She writes:

"I hadn’t sat up for months, but this time I had no choice. Throughout the long hours of the night I felt impaled on the edge of madness, and it seemed that two voices were speaking within me. One was saying, I can’t bear this. I’ll go mad. There’s no way I can endure this until morning. But the other replied, You have to bear it, you have no choice. They argued incessantly, like a vice growing tighter every second. Suddenly, out of the chaos came something new. I felt a powerful clarity, and a third voice said, You don’t have to get through until morning. You only have to get through the present moment."

Burch suddenly "saw that the present moment is always bearable", and that "much of my torment had grown from fear of the future". She felt "the tension torturing me open into expansiveness", and knew that "something extraordinary had broken through". According to Burch, this experience showed her "a completely different way of being", which "it has taken me many years... to integrate... into my daily experience in a way that's sustainable and practical".

The way that Burch eventually integrated these insights into her life was meditation and mindfulness practice, which she was also introduced to during her 1985 hospital stay. A hospital chaplain guided her through a visualization meditation which she experienced as transformative, showing her that "although my body was broken to some extent... my mind could be a tool for healing and well-being". After leaving hospital, she spent several years experimenting in "do it yourself" meditation and yoga, and investigating Hindu philosophy. She eventually discovered Buddhism, and "started attending Buddhism and meditation classes in Auckland with the Friends of the Western Buddhist Order (FWBO), now renamed the Triratna Buddhist Community." She quickly became a committed Buddhist, and in 1990, at the age of 30, she moved from New Zealand to the UK to live at Taraloka, a rural residential Buddhist retreat center for women. She lived there for 5 years, and during this time trained intensively in meditation and mindfulness - particularly mindfulness of breathing and loving-kindness meditation. She has described her time at Taraloka as "very intense, but I knew I needed this kind of strong medicine if I was to transform my mind in any lasting and meaningful way." In 1995 she was ordained into the Triratna Buddhist Order and took the name "Vidyamala", meaning "garland of wisdom".

In 1997, at the age of 37, Burch suffered another major deterioration in her health, becoming paralyzed in her bowel and bladder and partially paralyzed in her legs, meaning she had to use a wheelchair. For around five years, until she had a further surgery in 2002, she was largely housebound, and was forced to spend many months lying flat on her back. She has described this time as a "dark voyage", during which "I had to face my deepest and most destructive habits, especially my tendency to overdo things and then 'crash and burn'". In particular, Burch realized that she had been using meditation as a way of escaping her pain, meaning that when her pain worsened "I felt as if I’d failed and that I needed to try even harder, only to become even more confused and despondent when the pain persisted. And so the cycle continued, leaving me emotionally barren and desperate."

Influenced by the work of Stephen Levine (in particular his work with the dying, as described in his book Who Dies?) and Jon Kabat-Zinn (in particular his work with the chronically ill, as described in Full Catastrophe Living), as well as by the lessons of her own experience, Burch realized that she needed to "turn toward the difficult, rather than try to escape it." She also realized that she had to bring mindfulness more fully into her daily life, and was helped in this by pain management practices of "pacing" and "activity management". Gradually, Burch's daily life and meditation practice shifted into a mode of "acceptance", in which,

"I’m motivated to maintain what function and mobility I have, but my underlying quest is no longer to get rid of or overcome my pain. It’s simply to abide in my body as it is and to be as alive and awake as possible in each moment. I accept that my body is damaged in ways that cannot be undone and that pain will be my constant companion. I don’t like it, but I’m not fighting it as I used to, and it no longer dominates my life."

This acceptance helped Burch to experience what she describes as "healing towards the human condition", with her experience in its wholeness, including her pain and her joys, becoming a point of connection with others, and an opportunity for kindness and empathy.

== Breathworks ==
During the period she was largely housebound, Burch decided to begin teaching others mindful approaches to living with pain and illness, and in 2001 she received a grant from the UK's Millennium Commission to engage in training and begin a pilot class. Burch attended a five-day training event in mindfulness-based stress reduction (MBSR) with Jon Kabat-Zinn at the University of Bangor, and began a weekly "Peace of Mind" class in Manchester, teaching mindfulness and metta meditations to those suffering from chronic pain. Burch recalls:

If anyone had told me at that point that Breathworks would go on to be an international concern with branches in fifteen countries and that literally thousands of people would go through our courses, I’d have thought they were bonkers. At that point I thought I’d be lucky to pull off one class a week. I had no idea really. I didn’t know how to advertise, what to teach. I put an ad in the Manchester Evening News. The course was free at that point. To my amazement I was inundated with enquiries. I suddenly realised that there were so many people out there with physical health problems, with no idea where to turn.

Those attending the "Peace of Mind" classes responded positively to them, finding the practices Burch was teaching extremely helpful.

In 2002 Burch required major surgery involving the reconstruction of her lower spine, meaning that she was unable to work for around a year. During this time a friend of Burch's called Gary Hennessey (also known by his Buddhist name Ratnaguna) became involved in the "Peace of Mind" program, as did Burch's partner Sona Fricker. All were members of the Triratna Buddhist Order, and saw Burch's program as a way to help those in need while also providing a means of "right livelihood". They saw a "huge potential" in what Burch was doing, but realized that "we needed to be more strategic and that the process had to be a lot more rigorous." They decided that in addition to running "Peace of Mind" courses they would "train others to run the courses, eventually creating a community of trainers." In 2004, they co-founded Breathworks and ran their first teacher training retreat, and from this point their work "really started to take off". The majority of Breathworks trainers and teachers now come from a very wide range of professions and backgrounds and Breathworks is clear that, while drawing on contemplative training derived from Buddhism, it offers a secular mindfulness pathway appropriate to a wide range of applications.

After its foundation in 2004 Breathworks grew rapidly, playing a significant part in the development of the UK mindfulness teaching community, and establishing a range of programs and an international presence. Burch's 2002 surgery, along with the new meditation and lifestyle habits she adopted during her time of confinement, improved her health significantly, allowing her to take an active role in steering Breathworks forward, to write, and to travel nationally and internationally to teach. In 2005 Breathworks was a founding member of the UK Network of Mindfulness-Based Teacher Training Organisations (later renamed the British Association of Mindfulness-based Approaches, or BAMBA), and since then has adhered to this organization's Good Practice Guidelines for training mindfulness teachers and delivering courses. By 2019 there were almost 500 accredited Breathworks teachers working in 35 countries, and Breathworks had developed programs not only for those with chronic pain and illness (now renamed the Mindfulness for Health course) and for teacher training, but also for those suffering from stress, for people within the workplace, and for those who wish to receive mindfulness training online. Burch is particularly committed to making Breathworks courses available to all regardless of financial hardship, and to this end formed the Breathworks Foundation in 2009.

Burch has formalized the Breathworks approach to mindfulness for those with pain and illness, as taught in the Mindfulness for Health course, under the name mindfulness-based pain management (MBPM). Adapting the core concepts and practices of mindfulness-based stress reduction (MBSR) and mindfulness-based cognitive therapy (MBCT), MBPM integrates a pacing program into the course, and includes a distinctive emphasis on the concepts of "primary" and "secondary" suffering, and on the practice of "loving-kindness". Utilizing a "six-step process" oriented towards the cultivation of qualities such as awareness, acceptance, sympathetic joy, equanimity, loving-kindness, and choice, MBPM has been seen as sensitive to concerns about the dangers of removing mindfulness teaching from its original ethical framework within Buddhism, while also providing a secular evidence-based approach appropriate for people of all faiths, and none. Burch has published on MBPM in academic forums, and the approach has been subject to a range of clinical studies demonstrating its effectiveness.

Burch was appointed Officer of the Order of the British Empire (OBE) in the 2022 Birthday Honours for services to wellbeing and pain management.

== Other activities ==
Other than for her work with Breathworks, Burch is probably best known for her writings, and in particular for the three books she has published. Burch's first book - Living Well with Pain and Illness: the Mindful Way to Free Yourself from Suffering - was published in 2008, and presented the Breathworks program in a way that aimed to be accessible but was also theoretically subtle, laying out the philosophical underpinnings of the program and the ways that it related to Buddhism. The book also narrated Burch's own story and the stories of others who had benefited from the Breathworks program. Burch's second book - Mindfulness for Health: A Practical Guide to Relieving Pain, Reducing Stress and Restoring Wellbeing (2013) - was aimed at a broader audience than Living Well with Pain and Illness, including those with a lower level of literacy. Written with the journalist Danny Penman, it presented the Breathworks program in a clear, easy-to-follow way. Both books have been translated into more than a dozen languages, and Mindfulness for Health won the British Medical Association's 2014 Medical Books Award in the Popular Medicine category. In 2016, Burch published Mindfulness for Women: Declutter Your Mind, Simplify Your Life, Find Time to ‘Be’ with the magazine editor Claire Irvin, which addressed how mindfulness can be helpful in the context of the pressures affecting many modern women.

Burch has also taken an active role in promoting mindfulness and meditation both within the UK and internationally. She participated in the UK Parliament's All-Party Parliamentary Group on Mindfulness, which produced the 2015 "Mindful Nation UK" report recommending increased provision of mindfulness-based treatments for physical and mental health conditions. In 2018 Burch was awarded honorary membership of the British Pain Society in recognition of her "outstanding contribution to the alleviation of pain through personal endeavour and for her work for the Society", and in 2019 she was a keynote speaker at the Mindfulness in Schools ‘A Million Minds Matter’ conference. Burch has also lectured on mindfulness-based pain management (MBPM) at University College London and Bangor University, and sits on the advisory board of the Mindfulness Initiative, which works with legislators around the world to help them integrate mindfulness and meditation into public policy-making. In addition to her work promoting the secular uses of mindfulness, Burch also teaches mindfulness in a Buddhist context, including through leading Buddhist retreats and giving talks both in the UK and internationally.

== Bibliography ==
=== Books ===
- Burch, Vidyamala (2010). Living Well with Pain and Illness: the Mindful Way to Free Yourself from Suffering. Boulder, CO: Sounds True.
- Burch, Vidyamala and Danny Penman (2013). Mindfulness For Health: A Practical Guide To Relieving Pain, Reducing Stress and Restoring Wellbeing. London: Piatkus.
  - Published in the United States (also in 2013) as: You Are Not Your Pain: Using Mindfulness to Relieve Pain, Reduce Stress, and Restore Well-Being. New York: Flatiron.
- Burch, Vidyamala and Claire Irvin (2016). Mindfulness for Women: Declutter Your Mind, Simplify Your Life, Find Time to ‘Be’. London: Piatkus.

=== Articles and Chapters ===
- Burch, Vidyamala. "The mindful way to well-being: the Breathworks approach".
- — (2000). "Being Here". Dharma Life, Issue 14.
- — (2005). "One Moment at a Time". The Buddhist Hospice Trust.
- — (2009). "Learning to Live with Chronic Pain." Healthcare Counseling and Psychotherapy Journal.
- — (2014). "Being Mindful". Pain Matters, Issue 58.
- — (2016). "Meditation and the Management of Pain". In Michael A. West (ed.) The Psychology of Meditation: Research and Practice. Oxford: Oxford University Press.
- — (2020). "Foreword". In Karen Atkinson, Compassionate Mindful Inquiry in Therapeutic Practice: A Practical Guide for Mindfulness Teachers, Yoga Teachers and Allied Health Professionals. London: Jessica Kingsley.

== See also ==
- Self-compassion
- Buddhist meditation
- Buddhism and psychology
