= Meditation and pain =

Reduction of pain through meditation

Meditation and pain is the study of the physiological mechanisms underlying meditation—specifically its neural components—that implicate it in the reduction of pain perception.

Meditation is a behavioral method that has been used for several thousand years to monitor and regulate emotion and attention. Broadly speaking, meditation can be categorized into one of four modes (formal practices): focused attention, open monitoring, and compassion or love-kindness practices. In addition, there are sub-variations of each of the aforementioned practices that exist, such as prayer and zen.

Pain is defined as an unpleasant sensory or emotional experience that points to possible or actual tissue damage. The mechanisms underlying pain have been studied in order to develop methods to alleviate chronic pain. Research on meditation has shown that it involves specific brain regions that reduce overall pain perception.

== Neural mechanisms ==
Several studies using meditation experts as subjects have shown that meditative practices impact several regions of the brain. Studies using functional and structural MRI studies have shown increased activity in the anterior cingulate cortex (ACC) of individuals engaging in mindfulness meditation. Additionally, functional changes in the pre-frontal cortex (PFC) as well as activity in nociceptive processing have been observed in neuroimaging studies on meditation. Meta-analysis research using fMRI on the various modes of meditation has shown activation in the pre-motor cortex, basal ganglia, and insular cortex- regions associated with the reward pathways of the brain as well as motor control. Activation of the precentral gyrus, midbrain, inferior parietal lobule, precuneus, and hippocampus have also been correlated with meditation using PET scans and single photon emission computed tomography. Moreover, in a study using experienced meditators, the findings showed increased cortical thickness in the PFC.

Increased activation in the PFC has been correlated with chronic pain. In a study comparing the MRI scans of chronic lower back pain patients before and after treatment to their healthy counterparts, patients with chronic pain exhibited thinner PFCs than the control. After treatment, chronic lower back patients showed increased thickness in the PFC which decreased pain perception and physical disability. Additional brain regions are involved in pain perception in what is referred to as the 'pain matrix'. The pain matrix includes the primary somatosensory cortex (SI), insula, ACC, and thalamus. Reduction of pain perception via mediation is mediated by the interconnected brain pathways between pain perception and meditation. These intersections are what contribute to the reduction in perceived pain via mediation.

In a study using MEG and fMRI on a yoga master, researchers found that MEG recordings showed higher peaks of alpha waves in meditators as opposed to non-meditators in the parietal, occipital, and temporal regions; and fMRI images showed changes in the thalamus and SI regions. The resulting findings showed a reduction in pain perception, which is consistent in studies where researchers found deactivation of the thalamus in experienced meditators. A study recorded the response of thermal pain stimuli in experienced and novice meditators. Researchers found that long term meditators showed lower responses in the PFC and ACC, and that after 5 months of training, the control also experienced decreased responses in those same areas. As a result, reduction in pain perception is attributed to a decrease in brain regions involving the pain network. A study using event-related potentials (ERP) showed that the meditation group exhibited decreased activation in the SI and posterior insula compared to a healthy control, which led to a reduction in pain perception. This is mediated by the fact that pain is a result of activation of the insula and SI, so a deactivation of these regions as a result of meditation reduces pain perception.

== See also ==
- Mindfulness-based pain management
- Mindfulness-based cognitive therapy
- Mindfulness-based stress reduction
- Full Catastrophe Living
