= Breathworks =

British mindfulness organization

Breathworks CIC
- Founded: 2004
- Founder: Vidyamala Burch; Sona Fricker; Gary Hennessey
- Founded at: Manchester, United Kingdom
- Type: Community Interest Company
- Region served: Worldwide
- Services: Mindfulness-Based Pain Management; Mindfulness for Health; Mindfulness for Stress
- Website: www.breathworks-mindfulness.org.uk

Breathworks CIC is an international mindfulness organization founded in the United Kingdom, which offers mindfulness-based approaches to living well with pain, stress, and illness. It is known particularly for developing the approach of mindfulness-based pain management (MBPM), which shares many elements with mindfulness-based stress reduction (MBSR) but is adapted specifically for those living with chronic pain and illness, and incorporates a distinctive emphasis on the practice of 'loving-kindness'. Breathworks is a registered Community Interest Company (CIC) in the United Kingdom, and has nearly 500 accredited teachers working in 35 countries.

== History ==
Breathworks was founded in 2004 by Vidyamala Burch, Sona Fricker, and Gary Hennessey, growing out of a 2001 pilot scheme funded by a grant from the UK's Millennium Commission. This grant supported Burch to receive training from Jon Kabat-Zinn in mindfulness-based stress reduction, and enabled her to begin a "Peace of Mind" course in Manchester that used mindfulness and loving-kindness meditations to help those suffering from chronic pain. Drawing on her own experience of severe long-term back pain and partial paraplegia, Burch emphasized the need to turn towards difficult experiences with acceptance and kindness rather than continually struggling to defeat or overcome them. The pilot course received a positive response from participants, and was inundated with inquiries. An ordained member of the Triratna Buddhist Order, Burch worked with other members of the Order to found Breathworks, and initially focused the organization on creating a community of trainers who could share the "Peace of Mind" program more widely.

== Current work ==
Subsequent to its foundation in 2004 Breathworks has grown rapidly, playing an active role in the UK mindfulness teaching community and establishing an international presence. In 2005 Breathworks was a founding member of the UK Network of Mindfulness-Based Teacher Training Organisations (later renamed the British Association of Mindfulness-based Approaches, or BAMBA), and since then has adhered to this organization's Good Practice Guidelines for training mindfulness teachers and delivering courses. The majority of Breathworks trainers and teachers now come from a very wide range of professions and backgrounds and Breathworks is clear that, while drawing on contemplative training derived from Buddhism, it offers a secular mindfulness pathway appropriate to a wide range of applications. Breathworks established its Teacher Training Pathway in 2005, and by 2019 there were almost 500 accredited Breathworks teachers working in 35 countries, reaching 11,000 people. Breathworks is a registered Community Interest Company in the UK, meaning that its profits are used to provide bursaries and scholarships for its programs through the Breathworks Foundation charity.

Breathworks now offers a range of mindfulness programs catering to people with varied needs and circumstances. The "Peace of Mind" program evolved into the 8-week Mindfulness for Health course, which in 2015 was delivered to over 800 people in the UK. This course is aimed primarily at those suffering from chronic pain and illness, and is the main vehicle through which Breathworks delivers mindfulness-based pain management (MBPM). A parallel 8-week course for those suffering primarily from stress - the Mindfulness for Stress course - was developed by Gary Hennessey, and in 2015 was delivered to over 1000 people in the UK. Breathworks also offers bespoke Mindfulness in the Workplace programs. In 2020 Breathworks began offering live online versions of its Teacher Training, Mindfulness for Health, Mindfulness for Stress, and Mindfulness in the Workplace programs, allowing it to continue to reach significant numbers during the COVID-19 pandemic.

== Mindfulness-Based Pain Management (MBPM) ==
Breathworks is known particularly for developing the approach of mindfulness-based pain management (MBPM). Drawing on the experience of Breathworks co-founder Vidyamala Burch, MBPM adapts the core concepts and practices of mindfulness-based stress reduction (MBSR) and mindfulness-based cognitive therapy (MBCT) to create a program specifically tailored to those living with chronic pain and illness. In addition to using shorter meditations and integrating a pacing program into the course, MBPM includes a distinctive emphasis on the concepts of "primary" and "secondary" suffering, and on the practice of "loving-kindness". Utilizing a "six-step process" oriented towards the cultivation of qualities such as awareness, acceptance, sympathetic joy, equanimity, loving-kindness, and choice, MBPM has been seen as sensitive to concerns about the dangers of removing mindfulness teaching from its original ethical framework, while also providing a secular evidence-based approach appropriate for people of all faiths, and none. MBPM is delivered primarily through the Breathworks Mindfulness for Health course, but has also been adapted to those suffering from stress in the Mindfulness for Stress course. A 2018 literature review found that research on the Mindfulness for Health and Stress courses has shown them "to be very helpful for people with severe chronic pain and illness", but also noted that further randomized controlled trials were needed.

== See also ==
- Mindfulness-based pain management
- Vidyamala Burch
- Breathworks Foundation
- British Association of Mindfulness-Based Approaches (BAMBA)
- Mindfulness
- Metta
- Self-compassion
