= Mechanisms of mindfulness meditation =

Mindfulness has been defined in modern psychological terms as "paying attention to relevant aspects of experience in a nonjudgmental manner", and maintaining attention on present moment experience with an attitude of openness and acceptance. Meditation is a platform used to achieve mindfulness. Both practices, mindfulness and meditation, have been "directly inspired from the Buddhist tradition" and have been widely promoted by Jon Kabat-Zinn. Mindfulness meditation has been shown to have a positive impact on several psychiatric problems such as depression and therefore has formed the basis of mindfulness programs such as mindfulness-based cognitive therapy, mindfulness-based stress reduction and mindfulness-based pain management. The applications of mindfulness meditation are well established, however the mechanisms that underlie this practice are yet to be fully understood. Many tests and studies on soldiers with PTSD have shown tremendous positive results in decreasing stress levels and being able to cope with problems of the past, paving the way for more tests and studies to normalize and accept mindful based meditation and research, not only for soldiers with PTSD, but numerous mental inabilities or disabilities.

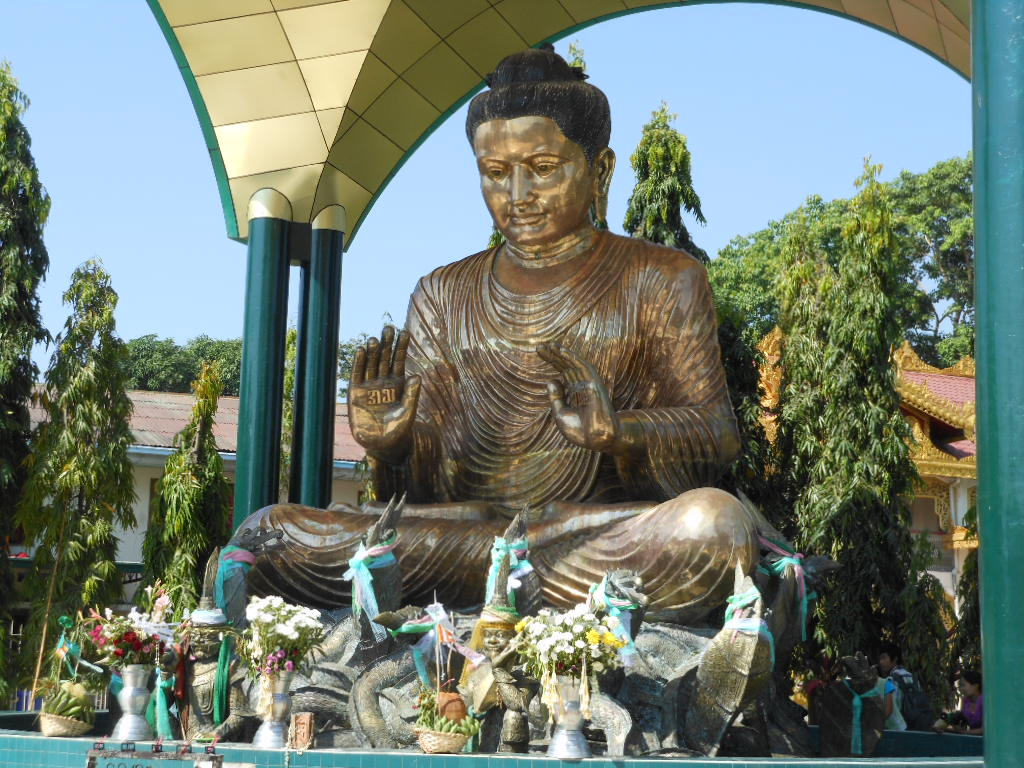
Mindfulness Meditation

Four components of mindfulness meditation have been proposed to describe much of the mechanism of action by which mindfulness meditation may work: attention regulation, body awareness, emotion regulation, and change in perspective on the self. All of the components described above are connected to each other. For example, when a person is triggered by an external stimulus, the executive attention system attempts to maintain a mindful state. There is also a heightened body awareness such as a rapid heartbeat which triggers an emotional response. The response is then regulated so that it does not become habitual, but constantly changes from moment to moment experience. This eventually leads to a change in the perspective of the self.

== Attention regulation ==
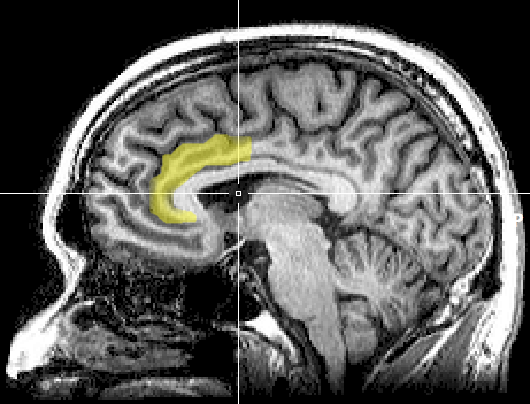
Anterior cingulate cortex

Attention regulation is the task of focusing attention on an object, acknowledging any distractions, and then returning your focus back to the object. Some evidence for mechanisms responsible for attention regulation during mindfulness meditation are shown below.

- Mindfulness meditators showed greater activation of rostral anterior cingulate cortex (ACC) and dorsal medial prefrontal cortex (MPFC). This suggests that meditators have a stronger processing of conflict/distraction and are more engaged in emotional regulation. However, as the meditators become more efficient at focused attention, regulation becomes unnecessary and consequentially decreases activation of ACC in the long term.
- The cortical thickness in the dorsal ACC was also found to be greater in the gray matter of experienced meditators.
- There is an increased frontal midline theta rhythm, which is related to attention demanding tasks and is believed to be indicative of ACC activation. High midline theta rhythm has been associated with lowest anxiety score in the Manifest Anxiety Scale (MAS), the highest score in the extrovertive scale of the Maudsley Personality Inventory (MPI) and the lowest score in the neurotic scale of MPI.

The ACC detects conflicting information coming from distractions. When a person is presented with a conflicting stimulus, the brain initially processes the stimulus incorrectly. This is known as error-related negativity (ERN). Before the ERN reaches a threshold, the correct conflict is detected by the frontocentral N2. After the correction, the rostral ACC is activated and allows for executive attention to the correct stimulus. Therefore, mindfulness meditation could potentially be a method for treating attention related disorders such as ADHD and bipolar disorder.

== Body awareness ==
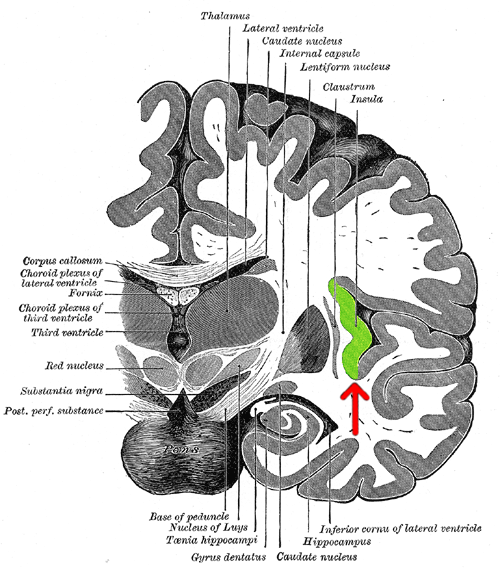
Gray matter & insula

Body awareness refers to focusing on an object/task within the body such as breathing. From a qualitative interview with ten mindfulness meditators, some of the following responses were observed: "When I'm walking, I deliberately notice the sensations of my body moving" and "I notice how foods and drinks affect my thoughts, bodily sensations, and emotions”. The two possible mechanisms by which a mindfulness meditator can experience body awareness are discussed below.

- Meditators showed a greater cortical thickness and greater gray matter concentration in the right anterior insula.
- On the contrary, subjects who had undergone 8 weeks of mindfulness training showed no significant change in gray matter concentration of the insula, but rather an increase gray matter concentration of the temporo-parietal junction.

The insula is responsible for awareness to stimuli and the thickness of its gray matter correlates to the accuracy and detection of the stimuli by the nervous system. Qualitative evidence suggests that mindfulness meditation impacts body awareness, however this component is not well characterized.

== Emotion regulation ==
Emotions can be regulated cognitively or behaviorally. Cognitive regulation (in terms of mindfulness meditation) means having control over giving attention to a particular stimuli or by changing the response to that stimuli. The cognitive change is achieved through reappraisal (interpreting the stimulus in a more positive manner) and extinction (reversing the response to the stimulus). Behavioral regulation refers to inhibiting the expression of certain behaviors in response to a stimulus. Research suggests two main mechanisms for how mindfulness meditation influences the emotional response to a stimulus.

- Mindfulness meditation regulates emotions via increased activation of the dorso-medial PFC and rostral ACC.
- Increased activation of the ventrolateral PFC can regulate emotion by decreasing the activity of the amygdala. This was also predicted by a study that observed the effect of a person's mood/attitude during mindfulness on brain activation.

Lateral prefrontal cortex (lPFC) is important for selective attention while ventral prefrontal cortex (vPFC) is involved in inhibiting a response. As noted before, the anterior cingulate cortex (ACC) has been noted for maintaining attention to a stimulus. The amygdala is responsible for generating emotions. Mindfulness meditation is believed to be able to regulate negative thoughts and decrease emotional reactivity through these regions of the brain. Emotion regulation deficits have been noted in disorders such as borderline personality disorder and depression. These deficits have been associated with reduced prefrontal activation and increased amygdala activity, which mindfulness meditation might be able to attenuate.

== Pain ==
Pain is known to activate the following regions of the brain: the anterior cingulate cortex, anterior/posterior insula, primary/secondary somatosensory cortices, and the thalamus. Mindfulness meditation may provide several methods by which a person can consciously regulate pain.

- Brown and Jones found that mindfulness meditation decreased pain anticipation in the right parietal cortex and mid-cingulate cortex. Mindfulness meditation also increased the activity of the anterior cingulate cortex (ACC) and ventromedial-prefrontal cortex (vm-PFC). Since the vm-PFC is involved in inhibiting emotional responses to stimuli, anticipation to pain was concluded to be reduced by cognitive and emotional control.
- Another study by Grant revealed that meditators showed greater activation of insula, thalamus, and mid-cingulate cortex while a lower activation of the regions responsible for emotion control (medial-PFC, OFC, and amygdala). Meditators were believed to be in a mental state that allowed them to pay close attention to the sensory input from the stimuli and simultaneously inhibit any appraisal or emotional reactivity.

Brown and Jones found that meditators showed no difference in pain sensitivity but rather the anticipation in pain. However, Grant's research showed that meditators experienced lower sensitivity to pain. These conflicting studies illustrate that the exact mechanism may vary with the expertise level or meditation technique.
