= J. Mark G. Williams =

English psychologist and academic

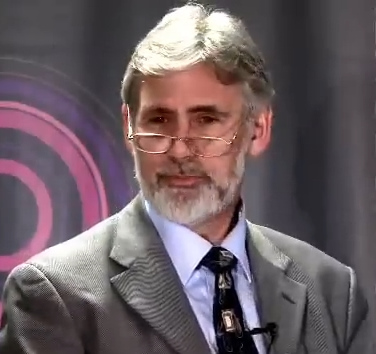
Williams in 2012

J. Mark G. Williams, is Emeritus Professor of Clinical Psychology and Honorary Senior Research Fellow at the University of Oxford Department of Psychiatry. He held previous posts at the University of Newcastle upon Tyne, the Medical Research Council Applied Psychology Unit (now Cognition and Brain Sciences Unit) in Cambridge and the University of Wales Bangor, where he founded the Institute for Medical and Social Care Research and the Centre for Mindfulness Research and Practice. He is a Fellow of the British Psychological Society, the Academy of Medical Sciences and the British Academy. He was educated at Stockton Grammar School, Stockton-on-Tees, and at St Peter's College, Oxford. He received an honorary doctorate from the Katholieke Universiteit Leuven (Faculty of Psychology and Educational Sciences) on May 8, 2023, in Leuven, Belgium.

His research is concerned with psychological models and treatment of depression and suicidal behaviour. He uses experimental cognitive psychology – in particular investigations into the specificity of autobiographical memory – to help understand the processes that increase risk of suicidal behaviour in depression. With colleagues John D. Teasdale (Cambridge) and Zindel Segal (Toronto) he developed Mindfulness-based Cognitive Therapy (MBCT; ) for prevention of relapse and recurrence in depression, and several RCTs have now found that MBCT significantly decreases the recurrence rate in those who have suffered three or more previous episodes of major depression.

Williams is an ordained priest of the Church of England and Honorary Canon of Christ Church Cathedral, Oxford. (Christ Church Cathedral Canons;)

== Works ==
1. Williams, J.M.G., Fennell, M.J.V., Barnhofer, T., Crane, R., Silverton, S. (2015) Mindfulness and the Transformation of Despair: Working with People at Risk of Suicide. New York, Guilford Press. (Translations: Japanese, German, Dutch, Korean)

2. Williams, J.M.G. (2014) Cry of Pain: Understanding Suicide and the Suicidal Mind (London, Piatkus: Updated and Revised Third Edition of Cry of Pain, 1997)

3. Teasdale, J.D., Williams, J.M.G & Segal, Z.V. (2013) The Mindful Way Workbook. Guilford, New York (Translations: Japanese, Danish, Dutch, Finnish, Chinese Mainland, Chinese Taiwan/Hong Kong, Swedish, French, German, Korean, Spanish, Portuguese, Hungarian).

4. Williams, J.M.G & Kabat-Zinn, J., (2013) (Eds) Mindfulness: Diverse Perspectives on its Meanings, Origins and Applications. Routledge, London (Translations: German)

5. Segal, Z.V., Williams, J.M.G., & Teasdale, J.D. (2013) Mindfulness-based Cognitive Therapy for Depression: Second Edition. Guilford Publications, New York. (Translations: German, Dutch, Spanish, Polish, Croatian, Serbian)

6. Williams, M., & Penman, D. (2011) Mindfulness: A Practical Guide to Finding Peace in a Frantic World Description & scrollable/arrow-searchable preview. (London, Piatkus, & New York, Rodale) Translations German, Dutch, Danish, simplified Chinese (Mainland), complex Chinese (Taiwan, Hong Kong), French, Bulgarian, Korean, Swedish, Estonian, Finnish, Norwegian, Turkish, Czech, Croatian, Spanish, Japanese, Russian, Polish, Italian, Portuguese (Brazil), Portuguese (Europe), Slovene, Romanian, Arabic.

7. Williams, J.M.G., Teasdale, J.D., Segal, Z.V., & Kabat-Zinn, J. (2007) The Mindful Way through Depression: Freeing Yourself from Chronic Unhappiness (New York, Guilford) Translations: Dutch, Danish, Swedish, German, Greek, Polish, Chinese (simplified; Mainland) Chinese (complex; Taiwan, Hong Kong), Finnish, Spanish, Italian, Japanese, Korean, Russian, Norwegian, Portuguese (Brazil), Hungarian, Romanian, Bulgarian, Serbian, Persian, Croatian, Serbian.

8. Segal, Z.V., Williams, J.M.G., & Teasdale, J.D. (2002) Mindfulness-based Cognitive Therapy for Depression: a new approach to preventing relapse. Guilford Publications, New York. Translations: Dutch, Italian, French, Spanish, Korean, Japanese, Chinese (simplified; Mainland) Chinese (complex; Taiwan, Hong Kong), Polish, German, Czech.

9. Williams, J.M.G. (2002) Suicide and Attempted Suicide. Penguin, London. (Second edition of Cry of Pain, 1997).

10. Williams, J.M.G., Watts, F.N., Macleod, C. & Mathews, A. (1997) Cognitive Psychology and Emotional Disorders. (Second Edition) John Wiley & Sons, Chichester. (Portuguese translation, 2000)

11. Williams, J.M.G. (1997) Cry of Pain: Understanding suicide and self harm. Penguin, London.

12. Williams, J.M.G. (1992) The Psychological Treatment of Depression: A Guide to the theory and practice of cognitive-behaviour therapy. (Second Edition). Routledge, London.

13. Scott, J., Williams, J.M.G. & Beck, A.T. (Eds.) (1989) Cognitive Therapy in Clinical Practice. Routledge, London. (Translations: Portuguese 1993; Hebrew 1995)

14. Williams, J.M.G., Watts, F.N., Macleod, C. & Mathews, A. (1988) Cognitive Psychology and Emotional Disorders, John Wiley & Sons, Chichester.

15. Watts, F.N, & Williams, J.M.G. (1988, re-issued 2007) The Psychology of Religious Knowing Cambridge, UK, Cambridge University Press.

16. Williams, J.M.G. (1984) The Psychological Treatment of Depression: A Guide to the theory and practice of cognitive-behaviour therapy. Croom Helm Ltd, London & Canberra, and Free Press, MacMillans Ltd, New York. (Translation: Japanese, 1992).
