= Self-compassion =

Extending compassion to one's self in instances of suffering or failure

In psychology, self-compassion is extending compassion to one's self in instances of perceived inadequacy, failure, or general suffering. American psychologist Kristin Neff has defined self-compassion as being composed of three main elements – self-kindness, common humanity, and mindfulness.

- Self-kindness: Self-compassion entails being warm towards oneself when encountering pain and personal shortcomings, rather than ignoring them or hurting oneself with self-criticism.
- Common humanity: Self-compassion also involves recognizing that suffering and personal failure is part of the shared human experience rather than isolating.
- Mindfulness: Self-compassion requires taking a balanced approach to one's negative emotions so that feelings are neither suppressed nor exaggerated. Negative thoughts and emotions are observed with openness, so that they are held in mindful awareness. Mindfulness is a non-judgmental, receptive mind state in which individuals observe their thoughts and feelings as they are, without trying to suppress or deny them. Conversely, mindfulness requires that one not be "over-identified" with mental or emotional phenomena, so that one suffers aversive reactions. This latter type of response involves narrowly focusing and ruminating on one's negative emotions.

Self-compassion in some ways resembles Carl Rogers' notion of "unconditional positive regard" applied both towards clients and oneself; Albert Ellis' "unconditional self-acceptance"; Maryhelen Snyder's notion of an "internal empathizer" that explored one's own experience with "curiosity and compassion"; Ann Weiser Cornell's notion of a gentle, allowing relationship with all parts of one's being; and Judith Jordan's concept of self-empathy, which implies acceptance, care and empathy towards the self.

Self-compassion is different from self-pity, a state of mind or emotional response of a person believing to be a victim and lacking the confidence and competence to cope with an adverse situation.

Research indicates that self-compassionate individuals experience greater psychological health than those who lack self-compassion. For example, self-compassion is positively associated with life satisfaction, wisdom, happiness, optimism, curiosity, learning goals, social connectedness, personal responsibility, and emotional resilience. At the same time, it is associated with a lower tendency for self-criticism, depression, anxiety, rumination, thought suppression, perfectionism, and disordered eating attitudes. Studies show that compassion can also be a useful variable in understanding mental health and resilience.

Self-compassion has different effects than self-esteem, a subjective emotional evaluation of the self. Although psychologists extolled the benefits of self-esteem for many years, recent research has exposed costs associated with the pursuit of high self-esteem, including narcissism, distorted self-perceptions, contingent and/or unstable self-worth, as well as anger and violence toward those who threaten the ego. As self-esteem is often associated with perceived self-worth in externalised domains such as appearance, academics and social approval, it is often unstable and susceptible to negative outcomes. In comparison, it appears that self-compassion offers the same mental health benefits as self-esteem, but with lesser drawbacks such as narcissism, ego-defensive anger, inaccurate self-perceptions, self-worth contingency, or social comparison.

Research into modern workplace environments and leadership suggests that self-compassion may contribute to increased resilience, adaptability, and team cohesion.

== Self-compassion in contemporary spirituality ==
In certain contemporary spiritual and contemplative traditions, self-compassion is described as an important practice for emotional regulation, personal growth, and spiritual development. Advocates of this approach suggest that cultivating kindness toward oneself may support processes associated with spiritual awakening, including increased self-awareness, reduced self-criticism, and an enhanced sense of inner peace.

Authors working within integrative psychology and mindfulness-based spiritual frameworks argue that self-compassion may enhance practices such as meditation, intuitive reflection, or contemplative inquiry by promoting a supportive internal environment. This environment may help individuals process difficult emotions, address unresolved personal experiences, and foster "inner healing." Such perspectives maintain that self-acceptance can deepen spiritual engagement, strengthen the mind–body connection, and contribute to emotional resilience within holistic or spiritual growth traditions.

While these views are frequently discussed in spiritual literature and self-help contexts, they represent subjective interpretations rather than empirically validated mechanisms. Academic research continues to examine the role of self-compassion in psychological well-being, emotional regulation, and personal development.

== Scales ==
Much of the research conducted on self-compassion so far has used the Self-Compassion Scale, created by Kristin Neff, which measures the degree to which individuals display self-kindness against self-judgment, common humanity versus isolation, and mindfulness versus over-identification.

The Self-Compassion Scale has been translated into different languages. Some of these include a Czech, Dutch, Japanese, Chinese, Turkish and Greek version.

=== Development ===
The original sample for which the scale was developed consisted of 68 undergraduate students from a large university in the United States. In this experiment, the participants narrowed down the potential scale items to 71.

The next stage of development involved testing the reliability and validity of the scale among a larger group of participants. During this research study, 391 undergraduate students were selected at random to complete the 71 previously narrowed-down scale items. Based on their results, the number of items was reduced to 26. The Self-Compassion Scale has good reliability and validity.

A second study was conducted to look more closely at the difference between self-esteem and self-compassion. This study consisted of 232 randomly selected, undergraduate students. Participants were asked to complete a number of different scales in questionnaire form. They were as follows: The 26-item Self-Compassion Scale, the 10-item Rosenberg Self-esteem Scale, the 10-item Self-determination Scale, the 21-item Basic Psychological Needs Scale, and the 40-item Narcissistic Personality Inventory. Based on the findings, Neff reports "that self-compassion and self-esteem were measuring two different psychological phenomena."

A third study was conducted to examine the construct validity. By comparing two different groups of people, researchers would be able to see the different levels of self-compassion. Forty-three Buddhist practitioners completed the Self-Compassion Scale as well as a self-esteem scale. The sample of 232 undergraduate students from the second study was used as the comparison group. As expected by Neff, the Buddhist practitioners had significantly higher self-compassion scores than the students.

Self-compassion development refers to the process of cultivating a kind, understanding, and balanced attitude toward oneself during moments of difficulty, failure, or emotional pain. It is commonly discussed in psychology and mental health research as a skill that can be learned and strengthened over time through intentional practice.

Research in positive psychology identifies self-compassion as consisting of three core components: self-kindness, common humanity, and mindful awareness. Developing self-compassion involves replacing harsh self-criticism with supportive inner dialogue, recognizing that personal struggles are part of shared human experience, and maintaining awareness of thoughts and emotions without over-identifying with them.

Studies suggest that self-compassion development is associated with improved emotional regulation, reduced anxiety and depression, increased resilience, and healthier motivation. Interventions such as mindfulness-based practices, compassion-focused therapy, and reflective exercises have been shown to support the development of self-compassion in both clinical and non-clinical populations

=== Self-compassion scale ===
The long version of the Self-Compassion Scale (SCS) consists of 26 items. This includes 6 subscales – self-kindness, self-judgement, common humanity, isolation, mindfulness, and over-identification. Neff recommends this scale for ages 14 and up with a minimum 8th grade reading level.

Presented on a Likert scale, ranging from 1 (almost no self-compassion) to 5 (constant self-compassion), those completing the SCS are able to gain insight on how they respond to themselves during a struggle or challenging time.

=== Short form ===
The short version of the Self-Compassion Scale (SCS-SF) consists of 12 items and is available in Dutch and English. Research reveals that the short form scale can be used competently as a substitute for the long form scale. A study conducted at the University of Leuven, Belgium concluded that when examining total scores, this shorter version provides an almost perfect correlation with the longer version.

=== Six-factor model ===
Neff's scale proposes six interacting components of self-compassion, which can be grouped as three dimensions with two opposite facets. The first dimension is self-kindness versus self-judgment, and taps into how individuals emotionally relate to themselves. Self-kindness refers to one's ability to be kind and understanding of oneself, whereas self-judgement refers to being critical and harsh towards oneself. The second dimension is common humanity versus isolation, and taps into how people cognitively understand their relationship to others. Common humanity refers to one's ability to recognize that everyone is imperfect and that suffering is part of the human condition, whereas isolation refers to feeling all alone in one's suffering. The third dimension is mindfulness versus over-identification, and taps into how people pay attention to their pain. Mindfulness refers to one's awareness and acceptance of painful experiences in a balanced and non-judgmental way, whereas over-identification refers to being absorbed by and ruminating on one's pain. Neff argues the six components of self-compassion interact and operate as a system. Support for this view was demonstrated in a study which found that writing with either kindness, common humanity or mindfulness yielded increases on the other self-compassion dimensions.

=== Criticisms of Neff's scale ===
Currently, Kristin Neff's Self-Compassion Scale is the main self-report instrument used to measure self-compassion. Although it is widely accepted as being a reliable and valid tool to measure self-compassion, some researchers have posed questions regarding the scale's generalizability and its use of a six-factor model.

==== Generalizability ====
Although some have questioned the generalizability of Neff's Self-Compassion Scale, a recent study found support for the measurement invariance of the scale across 18 samples, including student, community, and clinical samples in 12 different translations.

==== Six-factor model ====
A 2015 study performed by Angélica López et al. examined the factor structure, reliability, and construct validity of the 24 item Dutch version of Neff's Self-Compassion Scale using a large representative sample from the general population. The study consisted of 1,736 participants and used both a confirmatory factor analysis (CFA), and an exploratory factor analysis (EFA) to determine if Neff's six-factor structure could be replicated.

Lopez's study could not replicate the six-factor structure of Neff's Self-Compassion Scale, but rather suggested a two-factor model of the scale, created by grouping the positive and negative items separately. Lopez argued that self-compassion and self-criticism are distinct.

More recently, however, a large 20 sample study (N=11,685) examined the factor structure of the SCS in 13 translations, using bifactor Exploratory Structural Equation Modeling, which is a more appropriate way to analyze constructs that operate as a system. In this comprehensive study one general factor and six specific factors had the best fit in every sample examined, while a two-factor solution had an inadequate fit. Moreover, over 95% of the reliable variance in item responding could be explained by a single general factor. This factor structure has been found to be invariant across cultures.

Other evidence for the view that self-compassion is a global construct composed of six components that operate as a system stems from the fact that all six components change in tandem and are configured as a balanced system within individuals.

== Exercises ==
Self-compassion exercises generally consist of either a writing exercise, role-playing, or introspective contemplation, and are designed to foster self-kindness, mindfulness, and feelings of common humanity. Self-compassion exercises have been shown to be effective in increasing self-compassion, along with increases in self-efficacy, optimism, and mindfulness. These exercises have also been shown to decrease rumination. In individuals who were vulnerable to depression, one week of daily self-compassion exercises lead to reduced depression up to three months following the exercise, and increased happiness up to six months following the exercise, regardless of the pre-exercise levels of happiness. Self-compassion exercises have also been shown to benefit individuals with cancer. Studies show that self-compassion interventions, alongside cancer treatment, can improve negative symptoms such as emotional distress, fatigue, and body image. Studies show that compassion-based interventions have also been shown to improve both anxiety and depression in cancer patients.

=== How would you treat a friend? ===
This exercise asks the user to imagine that they are comforting a close friend who is going through a tough situation. The user is then asked to compare and contrast how they react internally to their own struggles, and to endeavour applying the same loving kindness to themselves that they would apply to a friend.

=== Self-compassion break ===
This exercise is to be used during times of acute distress. The user is asked to focus on a stressful event or situation. Then, the user is asked to repeat several prompts to themselves, each of which emphasizes one of the three main tenets of self-compassion: mindfulness, common humanity, and self-kindness.

=== Exploring through writing ===
In this exercise, the user is asked to focus on a facet of themself that they believe to be an imperfection, and that makes them feel inadequate. Once they have brought this issue to mind, they are asked to write a letter to themself from the perspective of an unconditionally loving imaginary friend. The user is then asked to focus on the soothing and comforting feelings of compassion that they have generated for themself.

=== Criticizer, criticized, and compassionate observer ===
This exercise asks the user to occupy several "chairs" during the course of the practice. Initially, they are asked to occupy the chair of the self-critic, and to express their feelings of self-criticism. They are asked to analyze this criticism and make note of its defining characteristics. Then, the user is asked to take the chair of their criticized self, and to imagine verbally responding to their inner critic. Subsequently, the user is prompted to conduct a dialogue between these two aspects of the self, the criticizer and the criticized. Following this, the user is asked to imagine themself as a compassionate observer of this dialogue, and finally the user is asked to reflect upon the experience.

=== Changing your critical self-talk ===
This exercise is meant to be conducted over several weeks, in the form of recurring reflection on the nature of their self-criticism. Users are asked to aim to notice when they are being self-critical, to react to their self-criticism with compassion, and to reframe the language of their inner critic.

=== Journal ===
This exercise entails keeping a daily journal for at least one week, and is used to reflect on difficult experiences, self-criticisms, and other stressors. The user is asked to analyze each of these events through the lenses of self-kindness (using gentle, comforting language to respond to the event), mindfulness (awareness of the negative emotions elicited by the situation), and common humanity (how the experience is part of the human condition).

=== Identifying what we really want ===
In this exercise, the user is asked to think about the ways that they use self-criticism as a way to motivate themself. Then, the user is asked to try to come up with a kinder and gentler and more caring way of motivating themself to make the desired change, and to try to be aware of how they use self-criticism as a motivational tool in the future.

=== Taking care of the caregiver ===
This exercise prompts the user to engage in meaningful self-care on a regular basis, and to practice these techniques while they are actively caring for others.

== Self-forgiveness as an element ==
Self-forgiveness is an element of self-compassion that involves releasing self-directed negative feelings. Research has found that self-forgiveness promotes greater overall well-being, specifically higher self-esteem and lower neuroticism.

Self-forgiveness is a psychological construct referring to the internal process by which an individual acknowledges personal wrongdoing, releases self-directed negative emotions such as guilt and shame, and cultivates positive regard and acceptance toward oneself. Unlike interpersonal forgiveness, which focuses on forgiving others, self-forgiveness is an intrapersonal process that involves both responsibility for one's actions and a reduction in self-condemnation.

=== Definition ===
Scholars commonly define self-forgiveness as the willing abandonment of self-resentment in the face of one's own acknowledged objective wrong, while fostering compassion, generosity, and love toward oneself. This process does not entail excusing or condoning past behavior; rather, it includes acknowledging wrongdoing, accepting responsibility, and actively working toward personal growth and self-acceptance.

=== Relationship to Self-Compassion ===
In psychological literature, self-compassion and self-forgiveness are closely related but distinct constructs. Self-compassion involves responding to suffering or personal failure with kindness and understanding, emphasizing common humanity and mindfulness. Self-forgiveness, as an element within this broader framework, specifically addresses the reduction of self-blame and the cultivation of self-acceptance following personal transgressions. Self-compassion provides a nurturing and nonjudgmental foundation that facilitates the process of self-forgiveness.

=== Process and Components ===
The process of self-forgiveness typically involves:

Acknowledgement of Wrongdoing: Recognizing and admitting that one's actions were morally or ethically wrong.

Emotional Transformation: Reducing feelings of guilt, shame, and self-criticism while fostering empathy and self-compassion.

Reconstruction: Developing a renewed and healthier self-concept that integrates accountability with self-kindness and personal growth.

=== Psychological Research and Outcomes ===
Research indicates that self-forgiveness is associated with improved psychological well-being, including greater life satisfaction, higher self-esteem, and reduced negative affect. It has been studied as part of therapeutic interventions aimed at enhancing mental health by encouraging individuals to confront and reconcile with their past mistakes in a compassionate way.

=== Pro-social behavior ===
When self-directed negative feelings are a result of negative past action, self-forgiveness does not mean ignoring or excusing offenses, but rather practicing self-compassion while taking full responsibility for past action. In this way, self-forgiveness may increase people's willingness to repent for wrongdoing. Despite this research, there is not yet a clear link between self-forgiveness and pro-social behavior. It would seem that accepting responsibility for negative actions leads to pro-social behavior, and coupling acceptance with self-forgiveness increases this effect.

== Self-acceptance as an element ==
Self-acceptance is an element of self-compassion that involves accepting oneself for who and what they are. Self-acceptance differs from self-esteem in that self-esteem involves globally evaluating one's worth. Self-acceptance means accepting the self despite flaws, weaknesses, and negative evaluations from others.

== Mindfulness ==
=== History ===
The concept of mindfulness and self-compassion has been around for over 2500 years, and is rooted in Eastern traditional Buddhist philosophy and Buddhist meditation. In Buddhist philosophy, mindfulness and compassion is considered to be two wings of one bird, with each concept overlapping one another but producing benefits for wellbeing. The word Mindfulness is the English translation of the word Vipassanā, which a combination of two words Vi, meaning in a special way and Passana, to observe, hence implying to observe in a special way. Compassion (karunaa) can be defined as an emotion that elicits the wanting to be free from suffering. Mindfulness in the context of self-compassion comprises acknowledging one's painful experiences in a balanced way that neither ignores, or ruminates on the disliked characteristics of oneself or life. According to Neff (2012) it is essential to be mindful of one's own personal suffering in order to extend compassion towards one's self. However it is essential to pay attention to self suffering in a grounded way in order to avoid "over-identification". Mindfulness tends to focus on the internal experience such as sensation, emotion and thoughts rather than focusing on the experiencer. Self-compassion focuses on soothing and comforting the self when faced with distressing experiences. Self-compassion is composed of three components; self kindness versus self-judgement, a sense of common humanity versus isolation and mindfulness versus over-identification when confronting painful thoughts and emotions.

=== Mindfulness-based stress reduction ===
Mindfulness-based stress reduction (MBSR), developed by Jon Kabat-Zinn is a structured group program that uses mindfulness meditation to relieve suffering associated with physical, psychosomatic and psychiatric disorders. Mindfulness-based stress reduction therapy seeks to increase the capacity for mindfulness, by reducing the need for self-focused thoughts and emotions that can lead to poor mental health. The exercise of mindfulness-based stress reduction therapy brings together the elements of meditation and yoga, greater awareness of the unity of mind and body, as well as the ways that the unconscious thoughts, feelings, and behaviors can undermine emotional, physical, and spiritual health. Clinical research from the past 25 years has found that MBSR is efficacious in reducing distress and enhancing individual well-being. Self-Compassion can play a critical role in mindfulness-based cognitive therapy interventions. In the study Shapiro et al. (2005) found that health care professionals who underwent a MBSR program reported significantly increased self-compassion and reduced stress levels compared to the waitlist control group. It was also reported that the increase of self-compassion appeared to reduce stress associated with the program.

=== Mindfulness-based cognitive therapy ===
Mindfulness-based cognitive therapy (MBCT) is an intervention therapy that combines meditation practices, psycho-education and cognitive behavioral strategies to prevent the relapse or recurrence of major depression. MBCT teaches individuals how to observe their thoughts and feelings by focusing their attention on natural objects, such as breathing and bodily sensations. Individuals are taught how to achieve awareness while holding an attitude of non-judgemental acceptance. Within MBCT, mindfulness skills are taught in order to recognize distressing thoughts and feelings, to be aware of these experiences, and utilize acceptance and self-compassion to break up associative networks that may cause a relapse. Self-compassion in response to negative thoughts and feelings is an adaptive process, which validates it as a key learning skill in MBCT. Self-compassion has been found to be a key mechanism in the effectiveness of mindfulness-based interventions such as mindfulness-based cognitive therapy (MBCT). Kuyken et al. (2010) compared the effect of MBCT with maintenance of antidepressants on relapse in depressive symptoms. They found that mindfulness and self-compassion were increased after MBCT was introduced. They also found that MBCT reduced the connection of cognitive reactivity and depressive relapse, and that the increased self-compassion helped mediate this association.

=== Mindfulness-based pain management ===
Mindfulness-based pain management (MBPM) is a mindfulness-based intervention (MBI) providing specific applications for people living with chronic pain and illness. Adapting the core concepts and practices of mindfulness-based stress reduction (MBSR) and mindfulness-based cognitive therapy (MBCT), MBPM includes a distinctive emphasis on the practice of 'loving-kindness', and has been seen as sensitive to concerns about removing mindfulness teaching from its original ethical framework within Buddhism. It was developed by Vidyamala Burch and is delivered through the programs of Breathworks. It has been subject to a range of clinical studies demonstrating its effectiveness.

=== Mindful self-compassion therapy ===
Mindful self-compassion (MSC) therapy is a hybrid therapy consisting of self-compassion and mindfulness practices. The term mindful is referred to in the MSC program as the basic mindfulness skills which is turning toward painful thoughts and emotions and seeing them as they are without suppression or avoidance which is crucial to the development of self-compassion. The MSC program however focuses more on self-compassion and sees mindfulness as a secondary emphasis. MSC teaches both formal (meditation) and informal (daily life) self-compassion practices. In addition there are homework MSC assignments that teaches participants to be kinder to themselves. The goal of MSC therapy is to provide participants with a variety of tools to increase self-compassion which they can then in turn integrate into their lives. A study conducted by Neff and Germer (2012) found that compared with the control group, MSC intervention participants reported significantly larger increases in self-compassion, mindfulness, wellbeing and a decrease in depression, stress and anxiety which were maintained for 6 months after the initial intervention.

=== Compassion focused therapy ===
Paul Gilbert (2009) developed compassion focused therapy that teaches clients that, due to how our brains have evolved, anxiety, anger and depression are natural experiences that are occur through no fault of our own. Patients are trained to change maladaptive thought patterns such as "I'm unlovable" and provide alternative self-statements, such as "I know for sure that some people love me". The goal of compassion focused therapy is to help patients develop a sense of warmth and emotional responsiveness to oneself. This is achieved through a variety of exercises including visualization, cultivating self-kindest through language by engaging in self-compassionate behaviors and habits. In compassion focused therapy, self-compassion is utilized through thoughts, images, and attention which is needed to stimulate and develop the contentment, soothing and safeness system.

=== Mindfulness skills in dialectical behavior therapy ===
Dialectical behavior therapy (DBT), is a derivative of cognitive behavior therapy that incorporates Eastern meditative practice. DBT is based on a dialectical world view that incorporates the balance and integration of opposing beliefs, particularly in acceptance and change. We accept ourselves as good enough, and we recognize the need for all of us to change and grow. Unlike MBCT and MBSR therapies, dialectical behavior therapy does not use meditation but less formal exercises, such as individual therapy sessions and group skill sessions. In general last for approximately a year where participants will engage in weekly individual skill therapy sessions and group skill sessions. The skills therapy sessions include four segments; core mindfulness, interpersonal effectiveness, emotion regulation, and distress tolerance skills. Dialectical behaviour therapist recommend developing self-compassion. The basic premise of using self-compassion therapies in DBT is to cultivate a compassionate mind state, defined by feelings of warmth, safety, presence and interconnectedness that can in turn relieve emotional dysregulation.

=== Mindfulness and related skills in acceptance and commitment therapy ===
Acceptance and commitment therapy (ACT) utilizes behavior change process, mindfulness and acceptance process. ACT, involves non-judgmental awareness and openness to cognitive sensation an emotional experiences. It also promotes exposure to previously avoided situations that have caused anxiety in order to promote acceptance. The avoidant behavior is treated by having clients observing their thoughts and accepting that their thoughts are not necessarily harmful. In general ACT strategies are customized to fit each participant so they obtain psycho-education, problem solving skills and psychological flexibility. Mindfulness and acceptance exercises and skills facilitate the behavioral changes necessary for its user to pursue a life that they feel is vital and meaningful. Various sources have indicated that acceptance and commitment therapy overlaps with Neff's conceptualization of self compassion particularly ACT's relational frame theory. The basic theories and concepts underlining ACT, may be relevant and have shown to be parallels and hold similarities found in self-compassion. The first is that both ACT's perspective and Neff's concept of self-kindness are linked to self-acceptance. Acceptance of one's painful experiences and hurt is related to kindness to one's self. Second, both Neff's conceptualization of self-compassion and ACT emphasize mindfulness, which is practiced in ACT through the concepts of defusion, acceptance, contact with the present moment and the self as a context. Defusion is also used in self-compassion as a means of allowing self-criticisms to pass through the mind without believing, proving them wrong or engaging in a stance to make these thoughts workable. In a study conducted by Yadavaia, Hayes & Vilardaga, 2014 test the efficacy of an ACT approach to self-compassion as compared to a waitlist control, the study showed that ACT interventions led to a large increase in self-compassion and psychopathology compared to the waitlist control at post-treatment and two months post intervention.

=== Mindfulness in the context of cancer ===
Recent research has shown that mindfulness and compassion-focused interventions can contribute positively to the overall well-being of individuals facing cancer. For instance, Cillessen et al. (2019) found that mindfulness-based interventions (MBIs) led to small but significant reductions in psychological distress among cancer patients and survivors. Similarly, Xie et al. (2020) identified that mindfulness-based stress reduction (MBSR) programs were effective in decreasing cancer-related fatigue, highlighting the potential physical health benefits of mindfulness in cancer care. These effects were seen particularly in patients with lung cancer. Moreover, Badaghi et al. (2024) reported that MBIs foster improvements in areas such as mindfulness skills, self-compassion, and spiritual well-being, contributing to positive health outcomes for those affected by cancer. Complementing these findings, Fan et al. (2022) observed that compassion-centered interventions not only reduced symptoms of depression but also enhanced self-compassion, indicating their potential for improving emotional health in cancer patients. These studies collectively emphasize the valuable role that mindfulness and compassion-based strategies can play in supporting the mental and physical health of individuals coping with cancer.

== See also ==
- Self
- Self-acceptance
- Self-awareness
- Self-concept
- Self-image
- Self-love
