= Breathworks Foundation =

UK charity

- Founded: 2009
- Founder: Vidyamala Burch
- Founded at: Manchester, England
- Type: Charitable Organization
- Purpose: To broaden access to mindfulness and compassion training.
- Website: www.breathworks-mindfulness.org.uk/foundation

The Breathworks Foundation is a registered charity in the United Kingdom that aims to broaden access to mindfulness and compassion training. It provides bursaries enabling people in financial hardship to access the programs of Breathworks CIC, develops partnerships with charities and community groups to expand the delivery of mindfulness training, and initiates research projects investigating the efficacy of Breathworks programs. It was founded by Vidyamala Burch and is advised by a group of academic experts.

== See also ==
- Mindfulness-based pain management
