= British Pain Society =

President	Prof Roger Knaggs
CEO	Ms Jo Brown
Secretariat	Ms Ester Zoroa
Location	Churchill House 35 Red Lion Square London, WC1R 4SG United Kingdom
Website	www.britishpainsociety.org

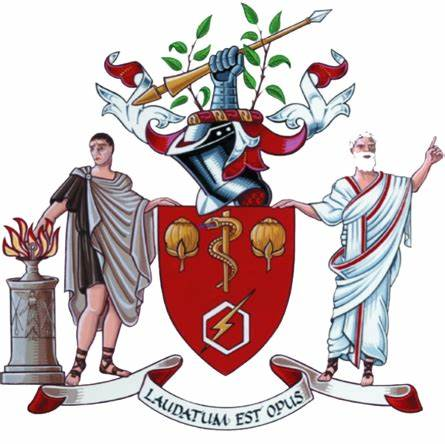

The British Pain Society (BPS) is a multidisciplinary community that brings together a diverse group of clinicians, scientists and those with lived pain experience to improve the knowledge and understanding of pain and its individual and societal impact, contributing to public health policy and clinical practice towards the worthy aim of alleviating pain-related suffering.

Current membership reflects the modern, multidisciplinary approach to pain management in its broadest sense with Anaesthesia, General Practice, Rheumatology, Nursing, Physiotherapy, Occupational Therapy and Psychology represented.

The society was founded in 1967. The BPS undertakes a wide range of activities, from setting standards in clinical care, acting as a Key Stakeholder for NHS consultation programmes, offering conferences, meetings, courses and webinars as well as publishing the British Journal of Pain and Pain News. It also seeks to collaborate with similar organisations nationally and internationally within the healthcare arena and with non-governmental agencies

== Services ==
Resources are available for both professionals and people living with pain through an informative website (www.britishpainsociety.org). Some information is open access and some is restricted to members only. A Patient Liaison Committee (PLC) was created in 2001 to act in an advisory capacity to the Council of the British Pain Society to ensure that the views of patients were represented within the Society. This has evolved to become The Patient Voice Committee (TPVC). The committee works to improve patient collaboration with all day-to-day functions of the society, furthering its aims and aspirations. Members of the TPVC are invited to actively engage in the work of the Special Interest Groups and Working / Task and Finish Groups.

== British Pain Society as a multidisciplinary team ==
Dr. Andrew Diamond (former President) was instrumental in opening membership, allowing professionals who were not clinicians to be able to join and run the Society. Professor Paul Watson (a physiotherapist) notes that he was the first non-medical professional to be part of the Pain Society Council, and he later served as Chairs of the Education Committee and Scientific Committee, eventually becoming the President of the BPS in 2009. Today, there are over seven hundred members from different specialties.

== British Pain Society publications ==
=== British Journal of Pain ===
British Journal of Pain is the official journal of the British Pain Society. It is a peer-reviewed quarterly British journal with an international multidisciplinary editorial board. The journal publishes original research and reviews on all major aspects of pain and pain management.

=== Other publications ===
As well as the British Journal of Pain, the society publishes Pain News, pain management guidelines, booklets for patients, pain scales in multiple languages that are downloadable and E-pain. Pain News is published quarterly to members updating events and latest updates in pain management. E-pain is an online platform that allows any health care professionals who wish to better understand and manage pain. It is free to all NHS staff members. There are eleven modules covering wide range of topics from acute to chronic pain, pathophysiology, and basic science bulletins, as well as specific modules such as cancer pain and pediatric pain. These e-learning modules are shared on e-learning anaesthesia (e-LA). The British Pain Society has also been involved in developing national guidelines such as National Institute for Health and Care Excellence (NICE).

== History ==
=== Key milestones in BPS history ===
- 10 Nov 1967 – First meeting of what is now known as the British Pain Society (then called The Pain Group), organised by Dr Mark Swerlaw. Annual meetings were held thereafter.
- 1971 – The Pain Group constituted into the Intractable Pain Society (IPS) of Great Britain and Ireland. A formal constitution was adopted. At this time it was for doctors (Consultants) only. This was the first professional society in the world devoted to Pain.
- 1979 – The IPS of Great Britain and Ireland was registered as a charity.
- 1987 – The IPS expanded membership to all health and research disciplines for the first time, paving the way for a merger with the existing British Chapter of the International Association for the Study of Pain (IASP) and becoming the Pain Society, the British Chapter of the IASP (see below)
- 1988 – The Intractable Pain Society changed its name to the Pain Society for the first time (this was then reversed by the Council one year later, to be reincorporated a decade later)
- 1989 – The Pain Society became a chapter of the IASP with the European Federation of Chapters of the IASP formed soon after
- 1994-1997 – Professor Kate Seers was elected as a co-opted Council member, and as such was the first nursing member of the council. Alongside Dr. Beverly Collett, they were the first women on the council.
- 1994 – Pain Medicine was formally recognised as the specialty within anaesthesia
- 2004 – The Pain Society was renamed The British Pain Society (BPS)
- 2007 – The Faculty of Pain Medicine of the Royal College of Anaesthetists was formed. This was aimed specifically at medically qualified pain specialists.

=== Detailed BPS history ===
The first incarnation of the BPS was under the title of the Pain Group, which subsequently became the Intractable Pain Society of Great Britain and Ireland (IPSGBI) in 1967, with its members being anaesthetists, thus predating the foundation of the International Association for the Study of Pain (IASP), which was founded in 1973. Over time the membership of the society changed to become multidisciplinary and ultimately became known by its current BPS title in 2004. According to Dr William Campbell (former President, Vice President, Treasurer and Secretary), IASP stated that any pain society in the world must be multidisciplinary and follow the aims and objectives of IASP. Then the society was renamed as The Pain Society (of GB and Ireland). Later, when the Irish members broke away to form their own organization, the Irish Pain Society in 2001, the society ultimately became the British Pain Society (BPS).

Pain relief clinics that focused primarily on nerve blocks were pioneered in the United States in the 1930s. The concept spread to Europe post World War II, with the first of these being set up in London, Plymouth, and Liverpool in 1947. Over the next two decades these evolved into more multidisciplinary clinics and by 1967 there were approximately 29 doctors (typically anaesthetists) working in this field in the United Kingdom. On 10 November 1967, the first ever meeting of the society took place at the Salford Postgraduate Medical Institute, University of Salford, UK. This meeting was organised by Dr M Swerdlow and was appointed as the first chairman of the society, with Dr Mark Churcher and Dr J Challenger being appointed as Secretary and Treasurer respectively. There were 16 founding members, including Prof Sir Michael Bond, Dr Mark Mehta, Prof Birkenham, Dr R Maher and Dr Sam Lipton. Other early members included Prof Iggo, Dr J Hannington-Kiss, Dr John Lloyd, Dr Hugh Raftery, Dr Keith Budd and Dr T Hardy.

According to Dr William Campbell, the society was established to attempt to prevent the development of persistent pain without the use of opioids. Early members were mostly anaesthetists, but also included physicians such as Dr R Maher who pioneered the use of intrathecal phenol for cancer pain. It was felt at the time that the society could be considered as a meeting of minds for likeminded individuals.

==== Controversy ====
In 2009, President Professor Paul Watson was asked to step down in relation to the controversy surrounding the disputed NICE guidelines for low back pain. A petition was gathered by Dr Chris Wells (current EFIC president) in order to generate an extraordinary general meeting regarding a perceived presidential conflict of interest between the society and NICE. A vote of no confidence was carried out, and a narrow majority voted against Prof Paul Watson remaining as president. Professor Watson had spent over a decade working for the society setting up Annual Scientific Meetings. In his resignation letter, Professor Watson wrote: "If there is anything that I can help the society with please don't be afraid to contact me." In recognition of his exceptional contribution and dedication to the BPS, Professor Paul Watson was awarded the Honorary Membership of the British Pain Society at Annual Scientific Meeting held in May 2017.

The unprecedented sequence of events left the society without a president and former president Professor Sir Michael Bond was appointed as interim president in order to maintain stability. Prof Sir Michael Bond had not been involved personally in the events. At the time, Professor Sir Michael Bond is reported to have stated 'We deplore the blogs which vilified Paul and which were offensive to your Society and the profession of physiotherapy.'

The following year Prof Richford Langford was voted in as president by the membership. 2010 also saw changes in UK government and a controversial reorganization of health service by Andrew Lansley followed, which saw a greater emphasis on primary care via the setting up of new Clinical Commissioning Groups. Professor Langford, in conjunction with Drs Price, Johnson, and Baranowski, as well as over 70 colleagues, had a key role in developing Pain Management Pathways via Map of Medicine in response to the NICE guidelines, which were viewed by many Pain Specialists as significantly flawed.

During the years that followed, the BPS had a pivotal role in the National Pain Audit Report carried out by Dr Cathy Price and Dr Stephen Ward in conjunction with the Dr Foster organization. The report discussed the impact of pain and drew on data related to nearly 10,000 new attendees at pain clinics nationally and the accessibility to multidisciplinary care. In addition, the then BPS journal Pain Reviews was reborn as the British Journal of Pain (BJP) under Prof Felicia Cox. The new BJP publishing original pain-related research under the auspices of a professional publishing house. Following a governmental Pain Summit in Westminster organized by the BPS, the RCoA Faculty of Pain Medicine, the RCGP and the Chronic Pain Policy Coalition. Following the Pain Summit, pain related questions were included in the Health Survey for England (HSE) for the first time. The BPS worked in partnership with the Chronic Pain Policy Coalition, to devise questions for this snapshot survey of the nation's health.

The society is also actively promoting the wider education of health professionals in relation to pain management. In conjunction with the Faculty of Pain Medicine of the Royal College of Anaesthetists (FPMRCoA), the society is involved in encouraging the implementation of the EPM Lite teaching method to UK medical schools nationally. This was first taught in Bristol and adopted shortly after at other leading medical schools such as Imperial College London.

==== 50th anniversary ====
In 2017 the British Pain Society celebrated its 50th Anniversary (founded in 1967). The Annual Scientific Meeting was held from 3 to 5 May 2017.

Pain News published in March 2017 summarises the history and evolution of the Society and contains interviews with past presidents including Dr Tim Nash, Professor Michael Bond, Dr Douglas Justin, Professor Paul Watson, Dr Joan Hester, Professor Richard Langford and Dr William Campbell.

Recent Activity

The 2023 Annual Scientific Meeting (ASM) was held in Glasgow, 9–11 May and was a welcome return to a fully face-to-face meeting after the enforced hybrid event of 2022, Wembley, London. A first for the BPS saw a well received outreach event working with Glasgow City Council and local NHS Pain Service providers and Pain Concern, hosting an information and signposting stand at Glasgow Central Station.

East Midlands Conference Centre, Nottingham, will play host to the 2024 ASM in early June.

Upcoming Events

The World Health Assembly, part of the WHO, has declared September as Pain Awareness Month. The aim is to raise public awareness and understanding of pain. The International Association for the Study of Pain (IASP), in line with their Year on Integrative Pain Care, focus on the vital importance of an individualized, multidisciplinary and multimodal approach to pain care.

== Affiliations with other organisations ==
The British Pain Society is affiliated with the International Association for the Study of Pain as well as the Royal College of Anaesthetists and the Association of Anaesthetists of Great Britain and Ireland. The society is also a National Chapter of the European Pain Federation, commonly known as the European Federation of Individual Chapters (EFIC).
