= Zindel Segal =

Ukrainian-Canadian cognitive psychologist

Zindel V. Segal (born 1956 in Lutsk, Ukraine) is a cognitive psychologist, a specialist on depression and one of the founders of Mindfulness-based Cognitive Therapy (MBCT).

A professor of psychology at University of Toronto, Segal combines mindfulness with conventional cognitive behavioral therapy, which teaches patients to develop a different relationship to sadness or unhappiness by observing and without judgment. Presently he is Distinguished Professor of Psychology in Mood Disorders in the Department of Psychology at the University of Toronto Scarborough. He is also the Director of Clinical Training in the Graduate Department of Clinical Psychological Science.

== Career ==
When he first started working on the mindfulness-based cognitive therapy (MBCT) project, he was studying how depression alters a person's self-image. His research included measuring a depressed patient's self-image by calculating the time it took her to react to positive or negative information about her. David Kupfer, who was head of the Psychobiology of Depression Research Network of the John D. and Catherine T. MacArthur Foundation, asked Segal to create a "maintenance" version of cognitive therapy which could be used to fight depression relapse after one had recovered from an acute episode. This need for a new therapy became Zindel Segal's new passion. He is the author of Mindfulness-Based Cognitive Therapy for Depression.

His research has helped to characterize psychological markers of relapse vulnerability to affective disorder. Among the books he has authored are Interpersonal Process in Cognitive Therapy, Cognitive Vulnerability to Depression, and Mindfulness-Based Cognitive Therapy for Depression: A new approach for preventing relapse. A Founding Fellow of the Academy of Cognitive Therapy, he was awarded the Douglas Utting Prize for significant contributions to the understanding and treatment of depression and the Hope Award by the Mood Disorders Association of Ontario. He continues to advocate for the relevance of mindfulness-based clinical care in psychiatry and mental health.

== Works ==
- The Self in emotional distress: cognitive and psychodynamic perspectives, by Zindel V. Segal, Sidney Jules Blatt. Guilford Press, 1993. ISBN 0-89862-256-5.
- Interpersonal process in cognitive therapy, by Jeremy D. Safran, Zindel V. Segal. Pub. Jason Aronson, 1996. ISBN 1-56821-858-3.
- Depression and the self, by Sidney Jules Blatt, Zindel V. Segal. Wiley, 1997.
- Abnormal Psychology, by Zindel V. Segal, Christopher D. Webster. Canadian Scholars Pr, 1998. ISBN 0-921627-48-3.
- Vulnerability to Depression by Rick E. Ingram, Ruth Ann Atchley, & Zindel V. Segal. The Guilford Press, 2011. ASIN: B00E2RR668
- Mindfulness Based Cognitive Therapy for Depression 2nd Ed by Zindel V. Segal, J. Mark G. Williams & John D. Teasdale. Guilford Press, 2013. ISBN 978-1462507504
- Cognitive-behavioral treatment of irritable bowel syndrome: the brain-gut connection, by Brenda B. Toner, Zindel V. Segal, Shelagh D. Emmott. Guilford Press, 2000. ISBN 1-57230-135-X.
- The Mindful Way Through Depression: Freeing yourself from chronic unhappiness, by J. Mark G. Williams, John D. Teasdale, Zindel V. Segal, Jon Kabat-Zinn. Guilford Press, 2007. ISBN 1-59385-128-6.
- The Mindful Way Workbook: An 8-Week Program to Free Yourself from Depression and Emotional Distress. by John D. Teasdale, J. Mark G. Williams & Zindel V. Segal. Guilford Press, 2014. ISBN 978-1462508143.
