= Ferguson Rodger =

Scottish physician

Ferguson Rodger CBE FRCP Glas FRCP Ed FRCPsych
- Born: 4 November 1907; Glasgow, Scotland
- Died: 1 June 1978 (aged 70)
- Education: University of Glasgow
- Scientific career
- Fields: Psychological medicine
- Workplaces: Western Infirmary and Southern General Hospitals

Thomas Ferguson Rodger (4 November 1907 – 1 June 1978) was a Scottish physician who was Professor of Psychological Medicine at the University of Glasgow from 1948 to 1973, and Emeritus Professor thereafter. He joined the Royal Army Medical Corps during the Second World War and rose to become a consultant psychiatrist with the rank of Brigadier.

His son was Scottish lawyer Alan Rodger, Baron Rodger of Earlsferry, who became Lord President of the Court of Session and subsequently Justice of the Supreme Court of the United Kingdom.

== Early life ==
Rodger was born in Glasgow and educated at North Kelvinside School (merged with Cleveden Secondary School in the 1990s), before going on to study at the Medical School of the University of Glasgow (BSc 1927, MBChB 1929). After graduating and undertaking general medical training, he was appointed assistant to Sir David Henderson at the Glasgow Royal Mental Hospital at Gartnavel, and spent a year from 1931 to 1932 as assistant to Professor Adolph Meyer at Johns Hopkins University in Baltimore, Maryland.

== Career ==
Rodger returned to Glasgow in 1934 as Deputy Superintendent of the Royal Mental Hospital and Assistant Lecturer in Psychiatry at the University. He remained there until 1940, when he joined the Royal Army Medical Corps as a Specialist in Psychiatry. By 1944, he was Consultant in Psychiatry with the rank of Brigadier, and was stationed in India and the South East Asia Command area (Burma, Ceylon, India, Thailand, Indochina, Malaya and Singapore). He increased the profile of psychiatry within military medicine and established psychiatry as an important tool in selection of officers. After the War, in 1945, he returned to Scotland as Senior Commissioner of the General Board of Control for Scotland (replaced in 1960 by the Mental Welfare Commission for Scotland), but retained his connection to the Army throughout his life.

In 1948, he was appointed to the new Chair of Psychological Medicine at the University of Glasgow. He developed his unit at Glasgow's Southern General Hospital into a strong component of the university's Medical School, and was instrumental in developing it into a leader in the development of psychiatry within hospitals and the combination of psychological medicine with neurological sciences. In 1972, the unit was formed into the Institute of Neurological Sciences, where the Glasgow Coma Scale was devised by Graham Teasdale and Bryan J. Jennett in 1974. He was an external examiner at Edinburgh and Leeds Universities.

Rodger served on a number of government committees as well as the Committee on Mental Health of the World Health Organisation. He was Chairman of the Scottish Division of the Royal Medico-Psychological Association in 1962 and President of the Association nationally in 1965, and was awarded an honorary fellowship in 1972 for his efforts during its application to become a Royal College. He was appointed CBE in 1967.

=== Publications ===
- Notes on Psychological Medicine, with Ian Ingram, Robert Mowbray and Gerald Timbury (1962)
- Psychology in Relation to Medicine, with Robert Mowbray (1963)

=== Honours ===
Rodger was appointed:

- Commander of the Order of the British Empire (CBE), 1967
- Member of the Royal College of Physicians of Edinburgh (MRCP Ed), 1939; Fellow (FRCP Ed), 1947
- Fellow of the Royal Faculty of Physicians and Surgeons of Glasgow (FRFPSG), 1958
- Fellow of the Royal College of Physicians and Surgeons of Glasgow (FRCP Glas), 1962 (the Royal Faculty changed its name to the Royal College in 1962, and the FRCP Glas qualification therefore supersedes the FRFPSG qualification)
- Fellow of the British Psychological Society (FBPsS), 1971
- Fellow of the Royal College of Psychiatrists (FRCPsych), 1971; Honorary Fellow, 1972

== Retirement ==
Rodger fell ill in 1972 and retired from the chair at Glasgow the following year. He was succeeded by Sir Michael Bond, previously a lecturer in neurosurgery at the university, who was knighted in 1995 for services to medicine. Bond retired in 1998, and the chair is currently vacant.

== Personal life ==
Rodger married Jean Chalmers in 1934, with whom he had two sons and a daughter. His son, Alan, was Lord President of the Court of Session, the head of Scotland's judiciary, from 1996 to 2001, and served as a judicial member of the House of Lords and subsequently Justice of the Supreme Court of the United Kingdom until his death in 2011; his daughter is a consultant physician. The family lived in Bearsden, an affluent suburb of Glasgow.
