= Wherever You Go, There You Are: Mindfulness Meditation in Everyday Life =

Jon Kabat-Zinn's second book

- Author: Jon Kabat-Zinn
- Genre: Self Help
- Publisher: Hachette Books
- Publication date: January 5, 2005 (and earlier in 1994)
- Pages: 304
- ISBN: 978-0-7868-8070-6

Wherever You Go, There You Are: Mindfulness Meditation in Everyday Life (originally published in 1994) is a non-fiction, self-help book by Jon Kabat-Zinn.

== Overview ==
Kabat-Zinn, a professor emeritus of medicine at the University of Massachusetts, offers his plan for improving mindfulness through meditation. He talks of mindfulness as learning to pay attention moment by moment, intentionally and with curiosity and compassion.

The book explains meditation as a scientifically established practice that can help reduce stress, improve cognitive function, and lead to improved awareness. The exercises in the book can be done by anyone, anywhere, at any time. This self help book is for those coming to meditation for the first time and to longtime practitioners, anyone who wants to achieve mindfulness.

== See also ==
- Dynamic meditation
