= Michael Bond (physician) =

English physician and medical researcher

Sir Michael Bond FRSA FRSE FRCPsych FRCPGlas FRCSE

Vice-Principal of the University of Glasgow
- In office 1986–1997
- Preceded by: Professor Sir Laurence Hunter
- Succeeded by: Professor Peter Holmes

Professor of Psychological Medicine, University of Glasgow
- In office 1973–1998
- Preceded by: Professor T Ferguson Rodger
- Succeeded by: Vacant

Personal details
- Born: 15 April 1936 (age 90)
- Education: University of Sheffield
- Profession: Physician

Sir Michael Richard Bond (born 15 April 1936) is an English physician and medical researcher, whose specialism lies in the study of pain. He has held a number of national and international appointments in his field and was professor of psychological medicine at the University of Glasgow from 1973 to 1998.

== Early life ==
Bond was educated at Magnus Grammar School in Newark, Nottinghamshire and studied medicine at the University of Sheffield. He graduated MBChB in 1961, undertook general medical training at Sheffield Royal Infirmary from 1961 to 1962, and worked as an assistant lecturer and resident registrar at the Department of Surgery of the university from 1962 to 1964 whilst carrying out research, for which he was awarded an MD in 1964. He then lectured in the Department of Psychiatry whilst undertaking a PhD, moving to the Institute of Neurological Sciences of the University of Glasgow, based at the city's Southern General Hospital, in 1967.

== Career ==
Upon completing his PhD in 1971, Bond was promoted to lecturer in neurosurgery at Glasgow. He was a locum Consultant Neurosurgeon in Oxford in 1972, and in 1973 was appointed to the chair in psychological medicine at Glasgow, succeeding Professor Ferguson Rodger. Whilst continuing his research, Bond was appointed vice-principal of the university in 1986, and took on the additional role of administrative dean of the Faculty of Medicine in 1991. He stepped down from these posts in 1997, and retired from the chair in 1998, but maintains his involvement in the university, mainly within its Alumni and Development Office. He chaired the fundraising committees for the University Medical School's new teaching accommodation, the Wolfson Medical School Building, completed in 2002, and for the Glasgow Cardiovascular Research Centre, completed in 2005. He is currently leading the appeal for the Beatson Pebble Appeal's new facilities at the Wolfson Wohl Cancer Research Centre at the University's Garscube Estate.

=== Appointments ===
Bond has held posts on university funding bodies, including the University Grants Committee and its successor, the Scottish Higher Education Funding Council, and the Joint Medical Advisory Committee. He was president (1999 to 2001) and interim president (2009 to 2010) of the British Pain Society, Member of the Council (1981 to 1983 and 1996 to 2008) of the International Association for the Study of Pain, and its president from 2002 to 2005. He was president of St Andrew's Ambulance from 1995 to 2000 and has been its vice-president since 2001. He was a trustee of the charitable Lloyds TSB Foundation from 1999 to 2005. He has received the following honours:

- Knighted for services to medicine, 1995
- Fellow of the Royal College of Surgeons of Edinburgh (FRCSE), 1969
- Fellow of the Royal College of Psychiatrists (FRCPsych), 1981
- Fellow of the Royal Society of Arts (FRSA), 1992
- Doctor of Science, University of Leicester, 1996
- Fellow of the Royal Society of Edinburgh (FRSE), 1998
- Fellow of the Royal College of Anaesthetists (Honorary), 1999
- Doctor of the University, University of Glasgow, 2001

=== Publications ===
- Pain, its nature, analysis and treatment, 1979, 2nd edn 1984
- Rehabilitation of the Head Injured Adult, (co-ed) 1983, 2nd edn 1989
- Pain: its nature and treatment, (with K. H. Simpson) 2006

== Personal life ==
Bond is married with two children and lives in Bearsden, a suburb of Glasgow.
