= John D. Teasdale =

British cognitive scientist

John D. Teasdale was a leading researcher at Oxford University, and then in the Cognition and Brain Sciences Unit in Cambridge. He dedicated his focus to understanding the cognition behind depression. Teasdale was a pioneer in the cognitive therapy advancements in the United Kingdom. He was one of the founders of Mindfulness-based Cognitive Therapy, MBCT.

He has received many awards to compliment his work and is now retired but still teaching meditation and mindfulness. He has received a Distinguished Scientist Award from the American Psychological Association, and has been elected Fellow of both the British Academy and the Academy of Medical Sciences.

He is retired, pursuing personal interests in practising and teaching meditation and mindfulness training.
