= Full Catastrophe Living =

1990 book by Jon Kabat-Zinn

- Author: Jon Kabat-Zinn
- Subjects: Mindfulness; Mind-body medicine Mindfulness-based stress reduction
- Published: 1990; 2013 (revised edition)
- Publisher: Random House
- Publication place: United States
- Pages: 512; 720 (revised edition)

Full Catastrophe Living: Using the Wisdom of Your Body and Mind to Face Stress, Pain, and Illness is a book by Jon Kabat-Zinn, first published in 1990, revised in 2013, which describes the mindfulness-based stress reduction (MBSR) program developed at the University of Massachusetts Medical Center's Stress Reduction Clinic. In addition to describing the content and background of MBSR, Kabat-Zinn describes scientific research showing the medical benefits of mindfulness-based interventions (MBIs), and lays out an approach to mind-body medicine emphasizing the depth of the interconnections between physical and mental health. The book has been called "one of the great classics of mind/body medicine", and has been seen as a landmark in the development of the secular mindfulness movement in the United States and internationally.

== Background ==
Full Catastrophe Living grew out of the work of the University of Massachusetts Medical Center's Stress Reduction Clinic, founded in 1979 by Jon Kabat-Zinn. The purpose of the Clinic was to "serve as a referral service for physicians and other health providers, to which they could send medical patients with a wide range of diagnoses and conditions who were not responding completely to more traditional treatments, or who were 'falling through the cracks' in the health care system altogether and not feeling satisfied with their medical treatments and outcomes." The Clinic's Stress Reduction and Relaxation Program, later renamed mindfulness-based stress reduction (MBSR), aimed to help patients by providing a relatively intensive training in mindfulness meditation and mindful hatha yoga. This was done through an eight-week course, which, in the words of Kabat-Zinn,

was meant to serve as an educational (in the sense of inviting what is already present to come forth) vehicle through which people could assume a degree of responsibility for their own well-being and participate more fully in their own unique movement towards greater levels of health by cultivating and refining our innate capacity for paying attention and for a deep, penetrative seeing/sensing of the interconnectedness of apparently separate aspects of experience, many of which tend to hover beneath our ordinary level of awareness regarding both inner and outer experience.

Kabat-Zinn composed Full Catastrophe Living with aim of capturing "the essence and spirit of the MBSR curriculum as it unfolds for our patients", while at the same time articulating "the dharma that underlies the curriculum, but without ever using the word 'Dharma' or invoking Buddhist thought or authority, since for obvious reasons, we do not teach MBSR in that way."

Kabat-Zinn recalls his desire for the book to "embody ... the dharma essence of the Buddha's teachings" in a way that was "accessible to mainstream Americans", and to avoid "as much as possible the risk of it being seen as Buddhist, 'New Age,' 'Eastern Mysticism' or just plain 'flakey.'" In this connection, Kabat-Zinn experienced internal conflict over whether to include a letter of endorsement from Thich Nhat Hanh in the book's first edition, which was published in 1990. Kabat-Zinn felt that the letter "spoke deeply and directly to the essence of the original vision and intention of MBSR", but was also mindful that it "used the very foreign word dharma not once, but four times". Nhat Hanh's letter read as follows:

This very readable and practical book will be helpful in many ways. I believe many people will profit from it. Reading it, you will see that meditation is something that deals with our daily life. The book can be described as a door opening both on the dharma (from the side of the world) and on the world (from the side of the dharma). When the dharma is really taking care of the problems of life, it is true dharma. And this is what I appreciate most about the book. I thank the author for having written it.

Eventually, Kabat-Zinn decided to include the letter in his book as a preface, judging that by 1990 "there was no longer as big a risk of our work being identified with a 'lunatic fringe'", due to the scientific evidence that had already emerged for MBSR's efficacy, as well as the accelerating interpenetration of the so-called "counter-culture" with America's mainstream culture.

== Publication ==
Full Catastrophe Living was first published in 1990 and went through numerous reprintings, before eventually being reissued in a revised second edition in 2013. The second edition refines the meditation instructions and descriptions of mindfulness-based approaches found in the first edition, and also reflects the "exponential" growth of scientific research into mindfulness and its clinical applications in the two decades after the book was first published.

== Title ==
The title Full Catastrophe Living is derived from the film Zorba the Greek, in which the title character says, in response to being asked whether he has ever married, "Am I not a man? Of course I've been married. Wife, house, kids ... the full catastrophe". According to Kabat-Zinn:

Zorba's response embodies a supreme appreciation for the richness of life and the inevitability of all its dilemmas, sorrows, traumas, tragedies, and ironies. His way is to "dance" in the gale of the full catastrophe, to celebrate life, to laugh with it and at himself, even in the face of personal failure and defeat. In doing so, he is never weighed down for long, never ultimately defeated either by the world or by his own considerable folly.

Kabat-Zinn has written that his editor for the first edition of the book was concerned that including the word "catastrophe" in the title might "repel potential readers right from the start." However, Kabat-Zinn found that the phrase Full Catastrophe Living "just kept coming back", as it seemed to touch on "something very special that lies within us, our capacity for embracing the actuality of things, often when it seems utterly impossible, in ways that are healing and transforming, even in the face of the full catastrophe of the human condition."

== Summary ==
=== Introduction ===
In the introduction to the revised edition of 2013, Kabat-Zinn defines mindfulness, reflects on the massive growth of MBSR and other mindfulness-based practices since the publication of the first edition in 1990, and lays out the findings of relevant scientific studies. He defines mindfulness operationally as "the awareness that arises by paying attention on purpose, in the present moment, and non-judgmentally", while noting that "when we speak of mindfulness, it is important to keep in mind that we equally mean heartfulness ... It is a more-than-conceptual knowing. It is more akin to wisdom, and to the freedom a wisdom perspective provides." He emphasizes that mindfulness involves accessing within ourselves capacities that we in fact already possess, "finding, recognizing, and making use of that in us which is already okay, already beautiful, already whole by virtue of our being human—and drawing upon it to live our lives as if it really mattered how we stand in relationship to what arises, whatever it is." While stressing that "mindfulness has its own internal logic and poetry", he suggests that scientific research showing its beneficial effects for health and well-being may provide extra incentive to follow the MBSR curriculum. He highlights, among other research, studies using fMRI technology to show significant beneficial changes in the brain subsequent to MBSR training.

=== Part I: The Practice of Mindfulness ===
Kabat-Zinn begins this section by laying out what he sees as the foundational attitudes necessary for mindfulness practice. The attitudes Kabat-Zinn identifies – non-judging, patience, beginner's mind, trust, non-striving, acceptance, and letting go – reflect his grounding in Zen Buddhism. In particular, Kabat-Zinn emphasizes the non-instrumental nature of mindfulness practice, as in his explication of "non-striving":

Almost everything we do we do for a purpose, to get something or somewhere. But in meditation this attitude can be a real obstacle. That is because meditation is different from all other human activities. Although it takes a lot of work and energy of a certain kind, ultimately meditation is a non-doing. It has no goal other than for you to be yourself. The irony is that you already are. This sounds paradoxical and a little crazy. Yet this paradox and craziness may be pointing you toward a new way of seeing yourself, one in which you are trying less and being more. This comes from intentionally cultivating the attitude of non-striving.

Kabat-Zinn's Zen training is also evident in his emphasis on non-duality, as in his explication of "non-judging", in which he stresses the limitations of all mental categorizations and judgements.

The remainder of the section is devoted to a detailed description of the various meditation practices taught in the MBSR course. These practices reflect a Theravada or vipassana influence, in that they emphasize the systematic investigation of various aspects of present-moment experience. Kabat-Zinn describes at length the practices of the body scan, mindfulness of breathing, and mindful hatha yoga, as well as other practices such as walking meditation and mindfulness of daily activities such as eating. He also narrates the stories of various MBSR participants and their experiences with the practices. For instance, he tells the story of "Mary", for whom the body scan precipitated a transformative encounter with physical tensions connected with traumatic experiences from childhood, and that of a young woman for whom the walking meditation proved to be the key to overcoming her extreme anxiety.

=== Part II: The Paradigm ===
In this section Kabat-Zinn lays out the theoretical basis for his approach to health and healing, emphasizing the concepts of "wholeness" and "interconnectedness". He summarizes this approach, which he associates with mind-body and integrative medicine, as follows:

Perhaps the most fundamental development in medicine over the past decades is the recognition that we can no longer think about health as being solely a characteristic of the body or the mind, because body and mind are not two separate domains—they are intimately interconnected and completely integrated. The new perspective acknowledges the central importance of thinking in terms of wholeness and interconnectedness and the need to pay attention to the interactions of mind, body, and behavior in any comprehensive effort to understand and treat illness. This view emphasizes that science will never be able fully to describe a complex dynamical process such as health, or even a relatively simple chronic disease, without looking at the functioning of the whole organism, rather than restricting itself solely to an analysis of parts and components, no matter how important that domain may be as well.

Kabat-Zinn goes on to lay out the extensive scientific evidence for the close interconnection between mental and physical processes, examining the impact that attitudes such as optimism or pessimism, self-efficacy, hardiness, sense of coherence, and anger can have on physical conditions including cancer and heart disease. He also extends the concept of wholeness to stress the intimate interconnectedness of all living and non-living phenomena, approvingly quoting a letter from Albert Einstein stating that the human sense of being "something separated from the rest" is "a kind of optical delusion of consciousness".

=== Part III: Stress ===
In this section Kabat-Zinn lays out a range of scientific evidence relating to the psychological and physiological effects of stress, then goes on to describe how mindfulness practice can alleviate these effects. Drawing on the work of Richard Lazarus and Susan Folkman, he defines psychological stress in terms of the relationship between a person and their environment, which in this case is perceived as taxing or threatening. Kabat-Zinn examines both the prevalence and the deleterious effects of chronic stress within modern societies, noting that many of the automatic stress reactions common to human beings are poorly adapted to the types of problems modern people most often face. He writes:

Health can be undermined by a lifetime of ingrained behavior patterns that compound and exacerbate the pressures of living we continually face. Ultimately, our habitual and automatic reactions to the stressors we encounter, particularly when we get in the habit of reacting maladaptively, determine in large measure how much stress we experience. Automatic reactions triggered out of unawareness—especially when the circumstances are not life-threatening but we take them that way all the same—can compound and exacerbate stress, making what might have remained basically simple problems into worse ones over time. They can prevent us from seeing clearly, from solving problems creatively, and from expressing our emotions effectively when we need to communicate with other people or even understand what is going on within ourselves. ... A lifetime of unconscious and unexamined habitual reactivity to challenges and perceived threats is likely to increase our risk of eventual breakdown and illness significantly.

Habitual maladaptive reactions to stressors can include physical tensions, workaholism, addiction to various chemicals, drugs, or foods, and depressive rumination. Kabat-Zinn describes how mindfulness practice can help people to overcome such maladaptive reactions by bringing them into awareness, "allowing you to engage in and influence the flow of events and your relationship to them at those very moments when you are most likely to react automatically, and plunge into hyperarousal and maladaptive attempts to keep things under some degree of control." Mindful awareness, Kabat-Zinn writes, allows us to respond to stressors wisely rather than reacting automatically, helping us to deal with stressors more effectively while also bringing "the comfort of wisdom and inner trust, the comfort of being whole."

=== Part IV: The Applications ===
In this section Kabat-Zinn offers detailed advice for practicing mindfulness in the face of a range of specific stressors, including medical symptoms, emotional disturbance, time and work pressures, relationship issues, and stress relating to political or world events. Reflecting MBSR's origins in a medical clinic, significant space is devoted to considerations relevant to people suffering from chronic pain and other long-term health conditions. Kabat-Zinn notes that MBSR's approach to pain seems counter-intuitive to many people, as it does not involve trying to get rid of it or distracting the mind from it, but rather involves accepting and investigating the pain with compassionate attention. He writes:

The way of mindfulness is to accept ourselves right now, as we are, symptoms or no symptoms, pain or no pain, fear or no fear. Instead of rejecting our experience as undesirable, we ask, "What is this symptom saying, what is it telling me about my body and my mind right now?" We allow ourselves, for a moment at least, to go right into the full-blown feeling of the symptom. This takes a certain amount of courage, especially if the symptom involves pain, a chronic illness, or fear of death. But the challenge here is can you at least "dip your toe in the water" by trying it just a little, say for ten seconds, just to move in a little closer for a clearer look? Can we metaphorically put out the welcome mat for what is here, simply because it is already here, and take a look, or even better, allow ourselves to feel our way into the full range of our experience in such moments?

Kabat-Zinn describes how paying attention to pain in this way can help people to identify with it less – to see a headache as "just a headache" rather than "my headache" – and to overcome habitual maladaptive mental and physical reactions that, in the case of chronic pain in particular, can play a significant role in both the intensity and the salience of pain experiences. Kabat-Zinn describes various scientific studies showing the significant benefits of mindfulness practice for chronic pain sufferers, and illustrates these findings with the stories of MBSR patients.

== Reception and influence ==
After its publication, Full Catastrophe Living became a global bestseller. It has been described as a "landmark" and a "classic" in the fields of mind-body medicine and secular mindfulness, and has been cited in scholarly works and books over fifteen thousand times as of August 2023. The book is generally seen as the foundational text of the mindfulness-based stress reduction (MBSR) program, which is offered in more than 740 hospitals, clinics, and stand-alone programs worldwide. Full Catastrophe Living has also been credited with an important role in inspiring the development of other mindfulness-based interventions (MBIs), including mindfulness-based cognitive therapy (MBCT) and mindfulness-based pain management (MBPM).

== See also ==
- Jon Kabat-Zinn
- Mindfulness-based stress reduction (MBSR)
