= European Pain Federation EFIC =

- Abbreviation: EFIC
- Formation: 1993
- Type: NGO
- Purpose: Scientific, educational
- Headquarters: Brussels, Belgium
- Region served: Worldwide
- Official language: English
- President: Brona Fullen
- Website: https://europeanpainfederation.eu/

The European Pain Federation (EFIC), is a multidisciplinary professional organisation in the field of pain research and medicine, consisting of the 37 chapters of the International Association for the Study of Pain. Established in 1993, the European Pain Federation EFIC constituent chapters represent close to 20,000 physicians, basic researchers, nurses, physiotherapists, psychologists and other healthcare professionals across Europe, who are involved in pain management and pain research. The European Journal of Pain is published since January 1997, and currently publishes 10 issues per year.

== History of EFIC ==
The European Pain Federation (EFIC) was formed by the presidents of the European Chapters at a joint meeting held at the time of the World Congress on Pain, in Paris in August, 1993. During his time as IASP President, Ulf Lindblom had developed the idea of building a Federation of the IASP Chapters in Europe. It was conceived as a way for better communication between the IASP headquarters in the USA and the European IASP Chapters. The main aim of establishing a European federation was to offer advice and guidance in pain medicine, specifically tailored for the needs of the European countries and patients.

The first EFIC "Pain in Europe" congress was held in Verona, Italy, 1995.

== Congress ==
The European Pain Federation organises a biennial scientific congress, Pain in Europe, to showcase the latest basic science and clinical developments in the field of pain medicine. The congress attracts over 3,000 attendees, primarily clinicians and, as well as showcasing research, also provides educational content based on the European Pain Federation curricula. The 2019 congress was held in Valencia, Spain and the 2022 will be held in Dublin, Ireland.

== Summit ==
The European Pain Federation organised for the first time in 2020 a Virtual Pain Education Summit, in order to meet the needs of the pain community. The Summit offered 4 educational tracks on Pain Medicine, Physiotherapy, Psychology and Nursing, along with interprofessional and topical lectures.
