= British Association of Mindfulness-Based Approaches =

British Association of Mindfulness-Based Approaches (BAMBA)
- Formation: 2005
- Type: Mindfulness organization
- Purpose: To support and develop good practice and integrity in the delivery of mindfulness-based approaches.
- Location: United Kingdom
- Members: Mindfulness teacher-training organizations Mindfulness teachers
- Website: https://bamba.org.uk/
- Formerly called: UK Network of Mindfulness-Based Teacher Training Organisations

The British Association of Mindfulness-Based Approaches (BAMBA) is a UK-based network of mindfulness organizations and teachers, which has been described as "the lead organisation overseeing the quality of mindfulness-based training in the UK." Founded in 2005 as the UK Network of Mindfulness-Based Teacher Training Organisations, BAMBA's original members were the mindfulness centers at the universities of Oxford, Bangor, and Exeter, as well as Breathworks CIC and NHS Scotland. The primary purpose of the organization is to support and develop good practice and integrity in the delivery of mindfulness-based approaches in the UK. It does this principally through the maintenance and dissemination of its Good Practice Guidelines, which provide a standards framework for its member organizations, and through the maintenance of a regulated list of accredited mindfulness teachers in the UK, who have been independently verified as having trained with a BAMBA member organization and as adhering to BAMBA Good Practice Guidelines. The independently verified teachers list has been called "an international first", and BAMBA has been described as "the closest thing that currently exists to a regulatory body for mindfulness training" in the UK. As of June 2020, BAMBA had 25 member organizations.
