= Mindfulness-based pain management =

Pain management strategy

Mindfulness-based pain management (MBPM) is a mindfulness-based intervention (MBI) providing specific applications for people living with chronic pain and illness. Adapting the core concepts and practices of mindfulness-based stress reduction (MBSR) and mindfulness-based cognitive therapy (MBCT), MBPM includes a distinctive emphasis on the practice of 'loving-kindness', and has been seen as sensitive to concerns about removing mindfulness teaching from its original ethical framework. It was developed by Vidyamala Burch and is delivered through the programs of Breathworks. It has been subject to a range of clinical studies demonstrating its effectiveness.

== Origins ==
MBPM was developed by Vidyamala Burch, growing out of her experience of chronic pain, her practice of Buddhist meditation, and her work with medical experts in pain management. Having suffered several accidents in her early life which, alongside a congenital spine condition, left her with severe long-term pain and partial paraplegia, Burch turned to meditation initially as a way to escape her bodily experience, after having been introduced to visualization practice during a long hospital stay in her mid-20s. Eventually, after encountering the Triratna Buddhist Community, she became a practicing Buddhist, and moved from New Zealand to the UK to live full-time in a residential Buddhist community. In the late-1990s she suffered a further collapse in her health, confining her to home for long periods and requiring her to start using a wheelchair, which led her to re-evaluate her meditation practice. Burch realized that "my approach was out of balance: Too much striving and not enough acceptance." She read widely about pain management and the emerging secular mindfulness movement, and eventually began teaching a course in meditation for people with chronic pain and illness in Manchester. In 2004, she co-founded the organization Breathworks, which delivers MBPM programs.

Philosophically, the origins of MBPM lie in the Buddha's teachings about suffering, mindfulness, and loving-kindness. The "core theoretical basis" of MBPM is the distinction between "primary" and "secondary" suffering, as explicated in the Buddha's parable of the two arrows in the Sallatha Sutta. According to this parable, while primary suffering or the unpleasant physical sensations that "come with being human" are inevitable, secondary suffering, which arises from mental "resistance and aversion", is not. MBPM programs train participants in kindly present-moment acceptance of primary suffering, leading to the diminishment or disappearance of secondary suffering. Initially, training focuses on the cultivation of focused attention and mindfulness of the present moment, and its transient character, through meditation, as taught in the Satipatthana Sutta. The training develops towards and is framed by an emphasis on the cultivation of loving-kindness, as outlined in the Brahma Viharas. This takes place both through explicit loving-kindness practices utilizing the imagination, and through bringing an attitude of kindliness and compassion to meditation practice and daily life as a whole. Although the underlying principles of MBPM are drawn from Buddhism, it is presented in secular language accessible to all and suitable for a modern healthcare intervention.

The scientific origins of MBPM lie in academic literature on pain and the medical benefits of mindfulness-based interventions (MBIs). In particular, MBPM grows out of new scientific understandings of pain that developed in the second half of the 20th century, which showed the complexity of the experience of pain and "the extent to which it involves the whole person—the mind as well as the body". The well-established "gate control theory", for instance, suggests that the experience of pain is connected with the operation of neural "gateways" that are affected by "emotional states, mental activity, and where attention is focused". These become persistently opened in people with chronic pain, even where underlying tissue damage has healed or is absent. Modern pain management draws on these understandings in the biopsychosocial model of pain, which holds that pain is best managed through a multifaceted approach addressing the biological, psychological, and social aspects of a patient's life. MBPM is intended to form one part of a multifaceted pain management program, based on the understanding that mindfulness and meditation may reduce the experience of pain through calming the "mental, physical, emotional, and nervous systems, allowing them to return to a state of balance." This is based on extensive research indicating that mindfulness-based interventions (MBIs) including mindfulness-based stress reduction (MBSR) and mindfulness-based cognitive therapy (MBCT) can result in clinically significant reductions in pain, in addition to other health benefits.

=== Traditional Chinese Medicinal use of Mindfulness Therapy ===
The origins to mindfulness conception and creation can be traced back thousands of years to traditional approaches from East Asian functional medicine, philosophy and spirituality, birthed from the basic underlying tenets from classical Taoist, Chinese Buddhist and Traditional Chinese medical texts, doctrine and teachings.

Mindfulness is considered the branch of its root practice meditation and is used extensively in Wuxing heqidao, Taiqi, Qigong, Neigong and by Chinese medicinal physicians as part of an integrative mind/body therapy for the prevention and treatment of injury, pain, disease and suffering.

== Content and delivery ==
MBPM is delivered primarily through the Breathworks Mindfulness for Health course, which is structured according to a "six stage process" corresponding with practices taught at different stages of the course. The process is as follows:

The Breathworks Six Stage Process
Stage	Theme	Meditations/Practices	8 Week Course
1	Awareness: establishing basic awareness	Body scan Breathing anchor Mindful movement	Weeks 1–3
2	Acceptance: turning towards the unpleasant	Compassionate acceptance	Week 4
3	Wonder: seeking out the pleasant	Treasure of pleasure	Week 5
4	Equanimity: gaining broader perspective	Open heart	Week 6
5	Connection: connecting with others	Connection	Week 7
6	Choice: responding not reacting	Mindfulness in daily life	Throughout the course

The course begins by establishing basic meditation skills — in particular the ability to apply focused awareness (Samatha) to physical, mental, and emotional experience — then goes on to train participants in the cultivation of a broader, non-reactive awareness (Vipassanā), and the bringing an attitude of compassion and kindliness (Metta) to oneself and others. In addition to learning various forms of meditation — which constitute the core of the course — participants engage in mindful movement, diary-based activity management, three-minute "breathing spaces", and habit-releasing practices. The course takes place over eight weeks, with weekly classes lasting 2.5 or 3 hours, and participants required to practice 20 minutes of meditation per day at home, as well as other short practices. In addition to the Breathworks Mindfulness for Health course, the MBPM approach has been adapted for those suffering primarily from stress in the Breathworks Mindfulness for Stress course.

MBPM courses draw many practices and concepts from mindfulness-based stress reduction (MBSR) and mindfulness-based cognitive therapy (MBCT), but provide specific applications for those living with chronic pain, illness, or other forms of suffering. The three core practices of MBSR – the body scan, breath awareness meditation, and yoga – are all utilized in MBPM, but MBPM meditations are shorter and MBPM movement practice involves cultivating body awareness during simple, non-challenging movements. Like MBCT, MBPM places emphasis on working with difficult thoughts and emotions and on mindfulness in daily life, but MBPM incorporates a pacing program drawn from pain management practice, and involves a distinctive emphasis on the concepts of primary and secondary suffering.

According to many observers, the most notable distinction between MBPM and other mindfulness-based interventions (MBIs) is its emphasis on loving-kindness, which is manifested in its stress on bringing kindliness and compassion to all forms of meditative awareness, in its teaching of loving-kindness practices utilizing the imagination, and in its six-stage process progressing from the individual to the interpersonal and collective aspects of human experience. This emphasis has been connected by some observers with a sensitivity to concerns about removing mindfulness teaching from its original ethical framework within Buddhism, while at the same time providing a secular evidence-based approach appropriate for people of all faiths, and none.

== Evaluation of effectiveness ==
In addition to extensive evidence indicating the effectiveness of mindfulness-based interventions (MBIs) in general for pain management, and further evidence indicating the effectiveness of compassion-based practices for pain, a range of studies have specifically supported the effectiveness of Breathworks Mindfulness for Health MBPM programs for the management of chronic pain and other long-term conditions. A 2010 study found that chronic pain patients participating in a Breathworks MBPM program reported significantly higher levels of wellbeing than those in the control group, with significant positive changes in catastrophizing, depression, outlook, pain self-efficacy, and mindful attention, along with particularly large improvements in pain acceptance. (Catastrophizing has been found to be a particularly important predictor of quality of life in those with chronic pain.) A randomized controlled trial in 2013 found that chronic pain patients participating in an MBPM program experienced improvements in their mental health and perceived control of pain symptoms, as well as exhibiting physical changes in brain regions associated with cognitive control and emotional regulation. Long-term qualitative studies with MBPM course participants suffering from chronic pain and other long-term conditions found significant sustained improvements in quality of life, pain acceptance, and self-directed self management, with one study finding benefits sustained up to nine years after course completion. 2018 studies conducted in Brazil and Spain found significant lasting improvements in pain and quality of life among musculoskeletal pain and cancer patients. A 2018 literature review found that research on Breathworks MBPM courses has shown them "to be very helpful for people with severe chronic pain and illness", while also noting that further randomized controlled trials were needed. In addition to research indicating the effectiveness of MBPM as delivered through the Breathworks Mindfulness for Health course, the effectiveness of MBPM as delivered through the Breathworks Mindfulness for Stress course and online Breathworks courses has also been supported by a number of studies.

== See also ==
- British Association of Mindfulness-Based Approaches (BAMBA)
- Compassion-focused therapy
- Mindfulness
- Samatha & vipassanā
- Brahmavihara
- Metta
- Self-compassion
- Buddhist meditation
- Buddhism and psychology
