= Mindfulness-based cognitive therapy =

Coupling of mindfulness practices and cognitive behaviour therapy

Mindfulness-based cognitive therapy (MBCT) is a form of psychotherapy that uses mindfulness techniques in combination with cognitive behavioral therapy (CBT) to prevent depression-relapse. MBCT was developed by Philip Barnard and John D. Teasdale, and Zindel Segal, building on Jon Kabat-Zinn's mindfulness-based stress reduction (MBSR).

CBT-inspired methods are used in MBCT, such as psycho-education, educating the participant about depression and the role that cognition plays within it. Like CBT, MBCT is built on the etiological theory that depression-relapse may occur when individuals, who have had a depression, become distressed, and return to automatic cognitive processes that can trigger a depressive episode. The goal of MBCT is to interrupt these automatic processes, and teach the participants to focus less on reacting to incoming stimuli, and instead accepting and observing them without judgment.

Like MBSR, the mindfulness practice encourages the participant to notice when automatic processes are occurring, and to respond less reactive and more reflective. MBCT encourages "decentering," becoming aware of all incoming thoughts and feelings and accepting them, but not attaching or reacting to them. This process aims to aid an individual in disengaging from self-criticism, rumination, and dysphoric moods that can arise when reacting to negative thinking patterns.

== Origins and development ==
MBCT was developed by John Teasdale, Philip Barnard, Zindel Segal and Mark Williams, combining elements from Kabat-Zin's mindfulness-based stress reduction program with elements from cognitive behaviotal therapy.

=== Kabat-Zin: Mindfulness-based stress reduction ===
Jon Kabat-Zin developed his mindfulness-based stress reduction out of his personal experience with Buddhist meditation, stressing mindfulness as the critical component.

=== Barnard & Teasdale: Model of Interacting Cognitive Subsystems ===
In 1991, building on Kabat-Zin's work, Philip Barnard and John Teasdale created a multilevel concept of the mind called "Interacting Cognitive Subsystems" (ICS). According to this model, the mind has multiple modes, that are responsible for receiving and processing new information cognitively and emotionally. The two main modes of mind are the "doing" mode and the "being" mode. The "doing" mode is also known as the "driven" mode. This mode is very goal-oriented and is triggered when the mind develops a discrepancy between how things are and how the mind wishes things to be. The second main mode of mind is the "being" mode. This mode is not focused on achieving specific goals; instead, the emphasis is on "accepting and allowing what is," without any immediate pressure to change it.

A central component of ICS is metacognitive awareness: the ability to experience negative thoughts and feelings as mental events that pass through the mind, rather than as a part of the self. Individuals with high metacognitive awareness are able to avoid depression and negative thought patterns more easily during stressful life situations, in comparison with individuals with low metacognitive awareness.

Meta-cognitive awareness is regularly reflected through an individual's ability to decenter. Decentering is the ability to be aware of incoming thoughts and feelings, and accepting them, but not attaching or reacting to them, perceiving thoughts and feelings as both impermanent and objective occurrences in the mind. This process aims to aid an individual in disengaging from self-criticism, rumination, and dysphoric moods that can arise when reacting to negative thinking patterns.

According to this model, an individual's vulnerability to depression is related to the degree to which he/she relies on only one of the modes of mind, inadvertently blocking the other modes. Mental health is related to an individual's ability to disengage from one mode or to easily move among the modes of mind. Individuals who are able to flexibly move between the modes of mind based on conditions in the environment are in the most favorable state. The ICS model theorizes that the "being" mode is the most likely mode of mind that will lead to lasting emotional changes. Therefore, to prevent relapse in depression, cognitive therapy must promote this mode. This led Teasdale to the creation of MBCT, which promotes the "being" mode.

== Working method ==
=== Cognitive-behavioral elements ===
CBT-inspired methods are used in MBCT, such as psycho-education, educating the participant about depression and the role that cognition plays within it. Like CBT, MBCT is build on the etiological theory that depression-relapse may occur when individuals, who have had a depression, become distressed, they return to automatic cognitive processes that can trigger a depressive episode. The goal of MBCT is to interrupt these automatic processes and teach the participants to focus less on reacting to incoming stimuli, and instead accepting and observing them without judgment.

=== Mindfulness-based elements ===
Its mindfulness-based approach postulates that being aware of events in the present, and not ruminating on the past or the future, will allow the individual to deal better with current stressors and distressing feelings, with a flexible and accepting mindset, rather than avoiding and, therefore, prolonging them. Like MBSR, this mindfulness practice encourages the participant to notice when automatic processes are occurring and to alter their reaction to be more of a reflection. With regard to development, MBCT emphasizes awareness of thoughts, which helps individuals recognize negative thoughts that lead to rumination. It is theorized that this aspect of MBCT is responsible for the observed clinical outcomes.

MBCT prioritizes learning how to pay attention or concentrate with purpose, in each moment and, most importantly, without judgment. Through mindfulness, clients can recognize that holding onto some of these feelings is ineffective and mentally destructive. MBCT focuses on having individuals recognize and be aware of their feelings instead of focusing on changing feelings. Mindfulness is also thought by Fulton et al. to be useful for the therapists during therapy sessions.

A focus on MDD and attention to negative thought processes such as false beliefs and rumination, distinguishes MBCT from other mindfulness-based therapies. Mindfulness-based stress reduction (MBSR), for example, is a more generalized program that also utilizes the practice of mindfulness. MBSR is a group-intervention program, like MBCT, that uses mindfulness to help improve the lives of individuals with chronic clinical ailments and high-stress.

=== Group intervention ===
The MBCT program is a group intervention that lasts eight weeks, or in eight sessions. During these eight weeks, there is a weekly course, which lasts two hours, and one day-long class after the fifth week. However, much of the practice is done outside class, with the participant using guided meditations and attempts to cultivate mindfulness in their daily lives.

== Applications and effectiveness ==
=== Depression-relapse prevention ===
MBCT is an intervention program developed to specifically target vulnerability to depressive relapse. Throughout the program, patients learn mind management skills leading to heightened meta-cognitive awareness, acceptance of negative thought patterns, and an ability to respond in skillful ways. During MBCT patients learn to decenter their negative thoughts and feelings, allowing the mind to move from an automatic thought pattern to conscious emotional processing. MBCT can be used as an alternative to maintenance antidepressant treatment, though it may be no more effective.

A meta-analysis by Jacob Piet and Esben Hougaard of the University of Aarhus, Denmark Research found that MBCT could be a viable option for individuals with MDD in preventing a relapse. Various studies have shown that it is most effective with individuals who have a history of at least three or more past episodes of MDD. Within that population, participants with life-event-triggered depressive episodes were least receptive to MBCT. According to a 2017 meta-analysis of 547 patients, mindfulness-based interventions support a 30–60% decrease in depressive and anxious symptoms, in addition to the overall level of patient stress.

=== General well-being ===
An MBCT-based program offered by the Tees, Esk, and Wear Valleys NHS Foundation Trust showed that measures of psychological distress, risk of burnout, self-compassion, anxiety, worry, mental well-being, and compassion for others all showed significant improvements after completing the program. Research supports that MBCT results in increased self-reported mindfulness, which suggests increased present-moment awareness, decentering, and acceptance, in addition to decreased maladaptive cognitive processes such as judgment, reactivity, rumination, and thought suppression. Results of a 2017 meta-analysis highlight the importance of home practice and its relation to conducive outcomes for mindfulness-based interventions.

=== Substance abuse ===
Beyond the use of MBCT to reduce depressive symptoms, a meta-analysis done by Chiesa and Serretti (2014) supports the effectiveness of mindfulness meditation in reducing cravings for individuals with substance abuse issues. Addiction is known to involve interference with the prefrontal cortex, which ordinarily allows for delaying of immediate gratification for longer-term benefits by the limbic and paralimbic brain regions. The nucleus accumbens, together with the ventral tegmental area, constitutes the central link in the reward circuit. The nucleus accumbens is also one of the brain structures that is most closely involved in drug dependency. In an experiment with smokers, mindfulness meditation practiced over a two-week period totaling five hours of meditation decreased smoking by about 60% and reduced their cravings, even for those smokers who had no prior intentions to quit. Neuroimaging among those who practice mindfulness meditation reveals increased activity in the prefrontal cortex.

=== Physical diseases ===
Although the primary purpose of MBCT is to prevent relapse in depressive symptomology, clinicians have been formulating ways in which MBCT can be used to treat physical symptoms of other diseases, such as diabetes and cancer. Clinicians are also discovering ways to use MBCT to treat the anxiety and weariness associated with these diseases.

== See also ==
- Buddhism and psychology
- Buddhist meditation
- Neural mechanisms of mindfulness meditation
- Mindfulness-based stress reduction
- Mindfulness-based pain management
- Full Catastrophe Living

== Sources ==
- Felder, J. N.; Dimidjian, S.; Segal, Z. (2012). "Collaboration in Mindfulness-Based Cognitive Therapy". Journal of Clinical Psychology. 68 (2): 179–186. doi:10.1002/jclp.21832. PMID 23616298.
- Gu, Jenny; Strauss, Clara; Bond, Rod; Cavanagh, Kate (2015). "How do mindfulness-based cognitive therapy and mindfulness-based stress reduction improve mental health and wellbeing? A systematic review and meta-analysis of mediation studies". Clinical Psychology Review. 37: 1–12. doi:10.1016/j.cpr.2015.01.006. PMID 25689576. S2CID 4117449.
- Hayes, Steven C.; Villatte, Matthieu; Levin, Michael; Hildebrandt, Mikaela (2011). "Open, Aware, and Active: Contextual Approaches as an Emerging Trend in the Behavioral and Cognitive Therapies". Annual Review of Clinical Psychology. 7 (1): 141–168. doi:10.1146/annurev-clinpsy-032210-104449. PMID 21219193.
- Herbert, James D.; Forman, Evan M. (2011). Acceptance and Mindfulness in Cognitive Behavior Therapy: Understanding and Applying New Theories. Hoboken: John Wiley & Sons.
- Hofmann, S. G.; Sawyer, A. T.; Fang, A. (2010). "The Empirical Status of the "New Wave" of Cognitive Behavioral Therapy". Psychiatric Clinics of North America. 33 (3): 701–710. doi:10.1016/j.psc.2010.04.006. PMC 2898899. PMID 20599141.
- Manicavasgar, V.; Parker, G.; Perich, T. (2011). "Mindfulness-Based Cognitive Therapy Vs. Cognitive Behaviour Therapy as a Treatment for Non-Melancholic Depression". Journal of Affective Disorders. 130 (1–2): 138–144. doi:10.1016/j.jad.2010.09.027. PMID 21093925.
- Psychology Today Staff. "Mindfulness-Based Cognitive Therapy".
- Segal, Z.; Teasdale, J.; Williams, M. (2002). Mindfulness-Based Cognitive Therapy for Depression. New York: Guilford Press.
- Seligman, Linda; Reichenberg, Lourie (2014). Theories of Counseling and Psychotherapy. New Jersey: Pearson Prentice Hall. ISBN 978-81-203-4909-4.
