= Mindfulness-based stress reduction =

Program offering mindfulness training

Mindfulness-based stress reduction (MBSR) is an educational program designed for learning mindfulness and discovering skillful ways to manage stress. MBSR was developed in the late 1970s by Jon Kabat-Zinn at the University of Massachusetts Medical School. The eight-week course combines mindfulness meditation, body awareness, and yoga to help individuals manage stress, pain, and illness. Although widely applied in clinical settings and researched for its benefits on well-being, MBSR is classified as an educational intervention rather than a form of psychotherapy.

MBSR incorporates a blend of mindfulness meditation, body awareness, yoga, and the exploration of patterns of behavior, thinking, feeling, and action. Mindfulness can be understood as the non-judgmental acceptance and investigation of present experience, including body sensations, internal mental states, thoughts, emotions, impulses and memories, in order to reduce suffering or distress and to increase well-being.

Mindfulness meditation is a method by which attention skills are cultivated, emotional regulation is developed, and rumination and worry are significantly reduced. During the past decades, mindfulness meditation has been the subject of more controlled clinical research, which suggests its potential beneficial effects for mental health, athletic performance, as well as physical health. While MBSR has its roots in wisdom teachings of Zen Buddhism, Hatha yoga, Samatha-vipassanā and Advaita Vedanta, the program itself is secular. The MBSR program is described in detail in Kabat-Zinn's 1990 book Full Catastrophe Living.

== History ==
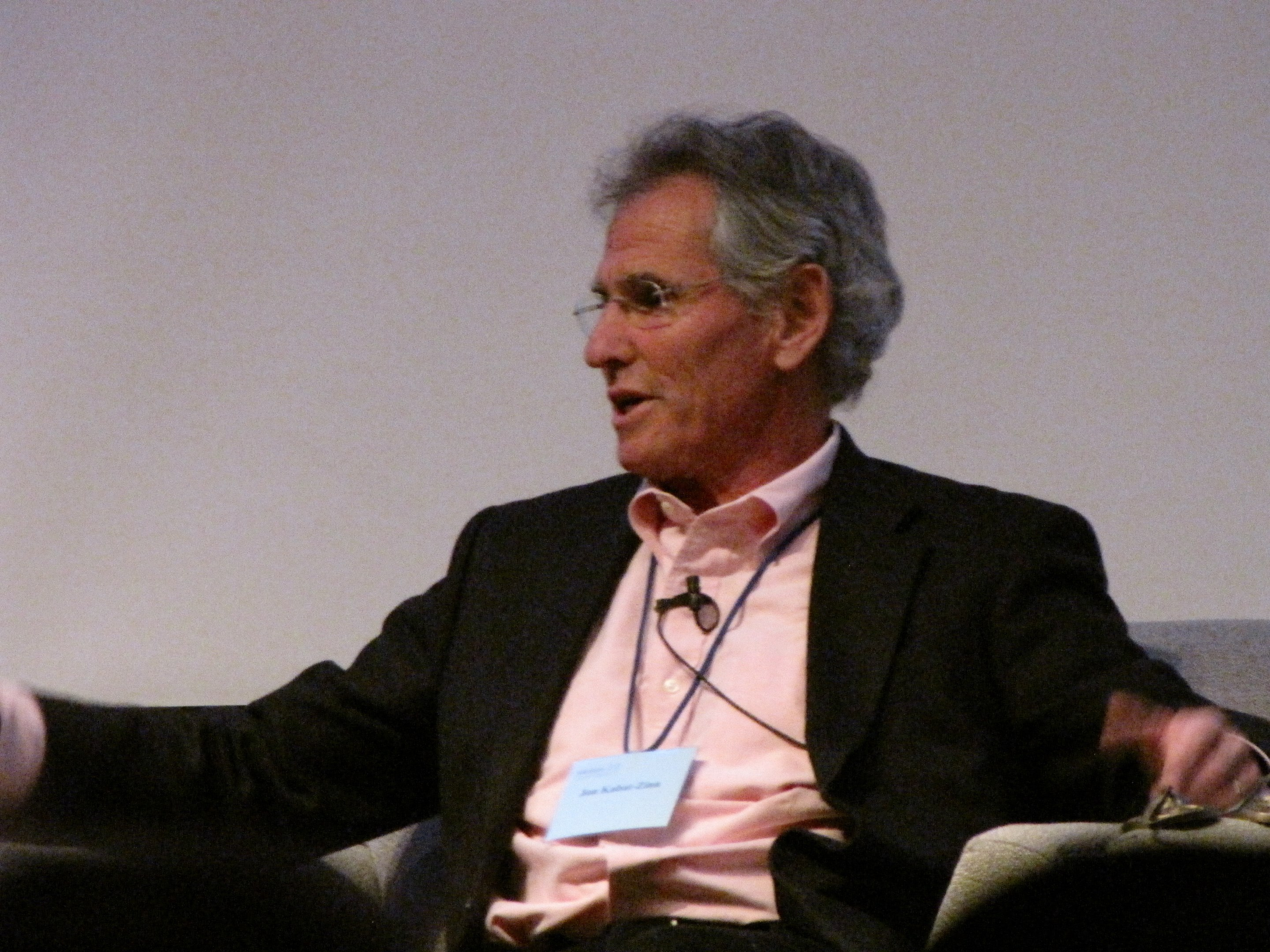
Jon Kabat-Zinn, founder of the Stress Reduction Clinic

In 1979, Jon Kabat-Zinn founded the Stress Reduction Clinic at the University of Massachusetts Medical Center. Nearly two decades later, he founded the Center for Mindfulness in Medicine, Health Care, and Society at the University of Massachusetts Medical School. These institutions have been instrumental in supporting the growth and implementation of MBSR in hospitals worldwide. Kabat-Zinn's book, Full Catastrophe Living, which details the MBSR program, became a bestseller and was reissued in a revised edition in 2013. In 1993, Jon Kabat-Zinn's MBSR course was featured in Bill Moyers' documentary, Healing from Within. By 2015, nearly 80% of medical schools offered some element of mindfulness training. More recently in 2021, MBSR publications have been increasing alongside research on psychotherapy, including cognitive behavioural therapy.

== Program ==
A meta-analysis described MBSR as "a group program that focuses upon the progressive acquisition of mindful awareness, of mindfulness". The MBSR program is an eight-week workshop conducted by certified trainers, consisting of weekly group meetings (2.5 hours each) and a one-day retreat (seven-hour mindfulness practice) between sessions six and seven. Participants are also assigned daily homework (45 minutes) and instructed in three primary techniques: mindfulness meditation, body scanning, and simple yoga postures. Group discussions and exploration—of the meditation practice and its application to everyday life—are integral to the program. These discussions are crucial for understanding how mindfulness practices can be incorporated into daily life. Body scanning, introduced during the first four weeks, involves quietly sitting or lying while systematically focusing attention on different body regions, starting from the toes and moving up to the top of the head. MBSR is founded on principles described by Kabat-Zinn such as non-judging, non-striving, acceptance, letting go, beginner's mind, patience, trust, and de-centering.

According to Kabat-Zinn, the core of MBSR is mindfulness, which he defines as "moment-to-moment, non-judgmental awareness." Throughout the program, participants are encouraged to engage in informal practices by incorporating mindfulness into their daily routines. This focus on the present is believed to enhance sensitivity to both the environment and one's reactions to it, thereby improving self-management and coping skills. It also provides a means to escape from dwelling on the past or worrying about the future, breaking the cycle of maladaptive cognitive patterns. Research has confirmed the validity and reliability of a weekly single-item practice quality assessment. Improvements in self-reported mindfulness and psychological symptoms were predicted by increases in practice quality, although no similar effects were observed for behavioral mindfulness. Additionally, longer practice sessions were associated with better practice quality.

Scientific evidence of the debilitating effects of stress on the human body and its evolutionary origins was highlighted by the work of Robert Sapolsky, particularly in the book Why Zebras Don't Get Ulcers. Mindfulness meditation has been shown in some studies to bring about significant reductions in psychological stress, and appears to prevent the physiological changes and biological manifestations that typically result from psychological stress. Early neuroimaging studies suggest that MBSR training impacts the brain areas responsible for attention, introspection, and emotional processing.

== MBSR Curriculum ==
=== Overview ===
MBSR has become a standardized eight-week program developed by Jon Kabat-Zinn at the University of Massachusetts Medical School in 1979. The course typically consists of eight group sessions lasting about 2.5–3 hours each, plus an orientation session held before the first class. The program follows a structured sequence of sessions aimed at developing specific mindfulness skills and integrating them into daily routines. Most programs also include an all-day retreat, usually scheduled between weeks six and seven, lasting approximately 6–7.5 hours and often conducted in silence.

The weekly classes combine guided mindfulness practices (such as the body scan, standing yoga, and sitting or walking meditation), group dialogue, and presentations about stress, coping, and mind-body awareness. Sessions explore topics including perception and stress reactivity, emotional regulation, interpersonal communication, and strategies for integrating mindfulness into daily life.

Participants are generally asked to engage in daily home practice of about 45–60 minutes, six days per week, using guided audio materials. This home practice is considered an integral component of the program and is emphasized in teaching-training standards.

=== Typical Session Themes ===
Orientation: Introduces participants to MBSR, the program structure, expectations, and the time commitment.

Week 1: Introduction to mindfulness, awareness of the present moment, and basic practices such as the body scan.

Week 2: Exploration of perception and automatic stress reactions.

Week 3: Mindful movement and cultivating presence in everyday life. Combining hatha yoga, sitting meditation, and optional walking meditation.

Week 4: Responding rather than reacting to stress; awareness of thoughts and emotions.

Week 5: Recognizing patterns of reactivity and working with difficult emotions.

Week 6: Interpersonal mindfulness and communication skills.

All-day session: Extended period of mindfulness practices, including meditation and yoga. Cultivating a sense of presence from moment to moment and being open to all experiences. Chance to practice mindful attention.

Week 7: Integrating mindfulness more fully into daily activities and sustaining practice.

Week 8: Review of skills and discussions of maintaining a long-term personal practice.

== Extent of practice ==
According to a 2014 article in Time magazine, mindfulness meditation is becoming popular among people who would not normally consider meditation. The curriculum started by Kabat-Zinn at University of Massachusetts Medical Center has produced nearly 1,000 certified MBSR instructors who are in nearly every state in the US and more than 30 countries. Corporations such as General Mills have made MBSR instruction available to their employees or set aside rooms for meditation. Democratic Congressman Tim Ryan published a book in 2012 titled A Mindful Nation and he has helped organize regular group meditation periods on Capitol Hill.

== Methods of practice ==
Mindfulness-based stress reduction (MBSR) classes and programs are offered at various facilities, including hospitals, retreat centers, and yoga studios. These programs typically focus on teaching:

- Mind and body awareness to reduce the physiological effects of stress, pain, or illness
- Experiential exploration of stress and distress to cultivate less emotional reactivity
- Equanimity in the face of change and loss, which is a natural part of human life
- Non-judgmental awareness in daily life
- Promotion of serenity and clarity in each moment
- Experiencing a more joyful life and accessing inner resources for healing and stress management
- Mindfulness meditation

== Efficacy of Mindfulness-Based Stress Reduction ==
=== Evaluating the effectiveness of MBSR ===
Mindfulness-based stress reduction (MBSR) and other mindfulness-based interventions (MBIs) have been widely studied for their psychological and physical health benefits across both clinical and non-clinical populations.

Research suggests that MBSR is especially effective in managing stress and improving quality of life in the context of health by offering a non-pharmacological approach that enhances functional status and well-being across a diverse range of health-related conditions. The effectiveness of MBSR in treating psychological disorders, particularly anxiety and depression, has been supported by recent meta-analytic evidence. The development of therapies to improve individuals' flexibility in switching between using and not using emotion regulation (ER) methods is necessary because it is linked to better mental health, well-being, and resilience. Research indicates that those who attended MBSR training exhibited greater regulatory decision-making flexibility. However, MBSR was found to be not more effective than traditional cognitive behavioral therapy and showed only moderate efficacy compared to other active treatments.

It has been demonstrated that MBSR has beneficial effects on healthy individuals, suffering individuals, and those close to suffering individuals. Roca and colleagues (2019) conducted an 8-week mindfulness-based stress reduction program for healthy participants. Five pillars of MBSR, including mindfulness, compassion, psychological well-being, psychological distress, and emotional-cognitive control, were identified. Participants' psychological functioning was examined and assessed using questionnaires. Mindfulness and overall well-being were significant among the five pillars observed. In post-secondary students, research on mindfulness-based stress reduction has demonstrated that it can reduce psychological distress, which is common in this age range. In one study, the long-term impact of an 8-week MBSR treatment persisted for 2 months after the intervention ended.

In addition, recent research has explored the ability of mindfulness-based stress reduction to increase self-compassion and enhance the well-being of those who are caregivers, specifically mothers, for youth struggling with substance use disorders. Mindfulness-based interventions allowed for the mothers to experience a decrease in stress as well as a better relationship with themselves which resulted in improved interpersonal relationships.

=== Evaluating the effectiveness of other mindfulness-based interventions (MBIs) ===
Mindfulness-based interventions (MBIs) are growing in popularity as a treatment option to reduce psychosomatic suffering. Mindfulness-based approaches have been found to be beneficial for healthy adults, for adolescents and children, healthcare professionals, as well as for different health-related outcomes including eating disorders, psychiatric conditions, pain management, sleep disorders, cancer care, psychological distress, and coping with health-related conditions. While many studies focus on positive outcomes, a 2026 systematic review on MBIs in children and adolescents found that few studies checked whether mindfulness might cause possible harms.

Interventions have shown effective in relieving health care workers of stress, anxiety, depression, burnout, and job-related distress. However, in a 2021 Cochrane review for mindfulness-based psychological interventions for medical students and junior doctors its utility remained unconfirmed due to few studies and risk of bias. According to a systematic review and meta-analysis, mindfulness meditation programs demonstrated moderate evidence of reducing anxiety, depression, and pain, but showed low evidence for improving stress/distress, mental health-related quality of life, positive mood, attention, substance use, eating habits, sleep, and weight. The study highlighted the need for stronger research designs to better understand the effects of meditation programs on various dimensions of mental health.

Other research suggests mindfulness training improves focus, attention, and the ability to work under stress. Mindfulness may also have potential benefits for cardiovascular health. Evidence suggests efficacy of mindfulness meditation in the treatment of substance use disorders. Mindfulness training may also be beneficial for people with fibromyalgia.

Mindfulness-based interventions and their impact have become prevalent in everyday life, especially when rooted in an academic setting. After interviewing children aged 11, it was apparent that mindfulness had contributed to their ability to regulate their emotions. In addition to these findings, these children expressed that the more mindfulness was incorporated by their school and teachers, the easier it was to apply its principles.

MBIs showed a positive effect on mental and somatic health during social interactions, compared with other active treatments in adults. However, these effects were largely independent of gender, study sample, duration, and compliance with the MBSR intervention. The research also highlighted that while MBIs were effective, their benefits were generally modest compared to other therapeutic interventions.

=== MBSR in cancer care ===
In the context of cancer and oncology care for patients, MBSR has shown improvements in negative symptoms such as fatigue, loneliness, anxiety, depression, and increases in overall quality of life. Interventions have also been effective in reducing cortisol levels leading to stress, and in some cancer types immune function improved.

Specifically in common cancer types like lung and breast, which often have more intense and invasive treatments, MBSR was found to reduce overall negative emotions, fear of recurrence, anxiety, and depression. Breast cancer patients had increases in post-traumatic growth near the end of MBSR interventions and at the 3 month mark. The same study noted a significant reduction in fatigue at the conclusion of the 8-week intervention, but did not report any impact on fatigue after 3 months. Another review found moderate reductions in fatigue resulting from MBSR, and provided evidence that improving one symptom in breast cancer often translates to improvements in other areas. Additional research on the stress-reduction effects of MBSR for women with breast cancer found slight reductions on anxiety and depression at the end of the intervention and six months after, but no significant effects were found two years after the intervention, suggesting that MBSR does not offer long-term symptom management. Mindfulness-based interventions, including MBSR, for lung cancer survivors displayed an overall reduction of cancer-related stress and depression and improved mindfulness skills. This review also included data from partners of lung cancer survivors, suggesting benefits for cancer care-related and familial relationships.

MBSR therapies extend beyond the treatment phase, with cancer survivors also reaping the benefits. Sleep quality improved among cancer survivors compared with standardized routine care. Survivors with a history of breast cancer showed significant improvements in depression, fatigue, and stress levels within a short-term time period adjusting to post-cancer life.

== See also ==
- Buddhism and psychology
- Buddhist meditation
- Metacognition
- Mindfulness (journal)
- Mindfulness and technology
- Mindful yoga
- Yoga as therapy
- Mindfulness-based pain management
- Mindfulness-based cognitive therapy
- Vipassana movement
