= Jon Kabat-Zinn =

American professor emeritus of medicine

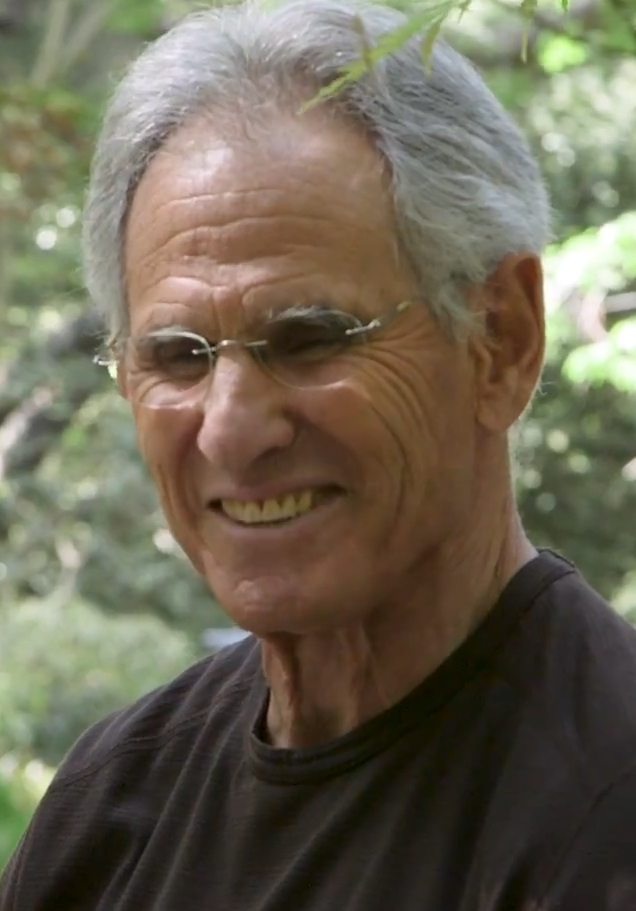
- Kabat-Zinn in 2018
- Born: Jon Kabat; June 5, 1944 (age 82); New York City, New York, U.S.
- Education: Haverford College (BA); Massachusetts Institute of Technology (PhD)
- Known for: Founder of Mindfulness-Based Stress Reduction
- Spouse: Myla Kabat-Zinn
- Children: 3
- Parent(s): Elvin Kabat; Sally Kabat

Jon Kabat-Zinn (born Jon Kabat, June 5, 1944) is an American professor emeritus of medicine and the creator of the Stress Reduction Clinic and the Center for Mindfulness in Medicine, Health Care, and Society at the University of Massachusetts Medical School. Kabat-Zinn was a student of Zen Buddhist teachers such as Philip Kapleau, Thich Nhat Hanh, and Seung Sahn, and is a founding member of Cambridge Zen Center. His practice of hatha yoga, Vipassanā and appreciation of the teachings of Soto Zen and Advaita Vedanta led him to integrate their teachings with scientific findings. He teaches mindfulness, which he says can help people cope with stress, anxiety, pain, and illness. The program he created, mindfulness-based stress reduction (MBSR), is offered by medical centers, hospitals, and health maintenance organizations, and is described in his book Full Catastrophe Living.

== Life and work ==
Kabat-Zinn was born in New York City in 1944 as the oldest of three children to Elvin Kabat, a biomedical scientist, and Sally Kabat, a painter. He graduated from Haverford College in 1964 and went on to earn a Ph.D. in molecular biology in 1971 from the Massachusetts Institute of Technology, where he studied under Salvador Luria, Nobel Laureate in medicine.

While at MIT, Kabat-Zinn was a leading campaigner against military research at the university and against the Vietnam War. To reduce student protests, MIT appointed him, alongside Noam Chomsky and George Katsiaficas, to an advisory panel on the future of the university's military labs. During this time, he pondered his life's purpose, which he called his "karmic assignment."

=== Career ===
Kabat-Zinn was first introduced to meditation by Philip Kapleau, a Zen teacher who came to speak at MIT where Kabat-Zinn was a student. Kabat-Zinn went on to study meditation with other Buddhist teachers such as Seungsahn. He also studied at the Insight Meditation Society with Jack Kornfield and Joseph Goldstein, and eventually taught there. In 1979 he founded the Stress Reduction Clinic at the University of Massachusetts Medical School, where he adapted Soto Zen, Vipassana, Hatha Yoga and Advaita Vedanta teachings and developed the Stress Reduction and Relaxation Program. He subsequently renamed the structured eight-week course to Mindfulness-Based Stress Reduction (MBSR). He removed the soteriological goals of the religious and spiritual systems that influenced the MBSR and any connection between mindfulness and Buddhism, instead putting MBSR in a scientific context. He subsequently also founded the Center for Mindfulness in Medicine, Health Care, and Society at the University of Massachusetts Medical School. His secular technique of Mindful Yoga, which combines meditation and yoga as exercise, has since spread worldwide. The course aims to help patients cope with stress, pain, and illness by using what is called "moment-to-moment awareness."

Kabat-Zinn's MBSR began to get increasing attention following the publication of his first book, Full Catastrophe Living: Using the Wisdom of Your Body and Mind to Face Stress, Pain, and Illness (1991), which gave detailed instructions for the practice. Then, in 1993, his work in the Stress Reduction Clinic was featured in Bill Moyers's PBS special Healing and the Mind which spurred wide interest in MBSR and helped to make Kabat-Zinn nationally famous. In 1994 Kabat-Zinn's second book, titled Wherever You Go, There You Are, became a national bestseller. In the latter part of the 1990s, many MBSR clinics were opened, either as standalone centers or as part of a hospital's holistic medicine program.

Research by Kabat-Zinn includes the effect of MBSR on psoriasis, pain, anxiety, brain function, and immune function.

He is a board member of the Mind and Life Institute, a group that organizes dialogues between the Dalai Lama and Western scientists.

MBSR has been adapted for use by the US military to improve combatants' "operational effectiveness," apparently with Kabat-Zinn's approval, which has provoked some controversy among mindfulness practitioners.

Discussing the integration of narratives into mindfulness practice, Kabat-Zinn has said, "the map... can occlude... the territory.' That is, thinking about a storyline can get in the way, like creating a mental representation 'map' rather than directly experiencing the 'territory' of the present moment.

Kabat-Zinn is Professor of Medicine Emeritus at the University of Massachusetts Medical School.

== Personal life ==
Kabat-Zinn is married to Myla Zinn, the daughter of the historian and playwright Howard Zinn and his wife Roslyn. They have three grown children.

Kabat-Zinn grew up in a non-practicing Jewish family. He has stated that his beliefs growing up were a fusion of science and art. Although he has been "trained in Buddhism and espouses its principles", he rejects the label of "Buddhist", preferring to "apply mindfulness within a scientific rather than a religious frame".

== Awards ==
- 2024: Doctor of Science honoris causa from Haverford College
- 2008: Mind and Brain Prize from the Center for Cognitive Science, University of Torino, Italy
- 2007: Inaugural Pioneer in Integrative Medicine Award from the Bravewell Philanthropic Collaborative for Integrative Medicine
- 2005: Distinguished Friend Award from the Association for Behavioral and Cognitive Therapies

== Works ==
- Full catastrophe living: using the wisdom of your body and mind to face stress, pain, and illness. Delta Trade Paperbacks. 1991. ISBN 0-385-30312-2.
- Mindfulness Meditation for Everyday Life. Piatkus, 1994. ISBN 0-7499-1422-X.
- Wherever You Go, There You Are: Mindfulness Meditation in Everyday Life. Hyperion Books, 1994. ISBN 1-4013-0778-7.
- The Power of Meditation and Prayer, with Sogyal Rinpoche, Larry Dossey, Michael Toms. Hay House, 1997. ISBN 1-56170-423-7.
- Everyday Blessings: The Inner Work of Mindful Parenting, with Myla Kabat-Zinn. Hyperion, 1997. ISBN 978-0-7868-8314-1.
- Coming to Our Senses: Healing Ourselves and the World Through Mindfulness. Hyperion, 2006. ISBN 0-7868-8654-4.
- The mindful way through depression: freeing yourself from chronic unhappiness, by J. Mark G. Williams, John D. Teasdale, Zindel V. Segal, Jon Kabat-Zinn. Guilford Press, 2007. ISBN 1593851286.
- Arriving at Your Own Door. Piatkus Books, 2008. ISBN 0-7499-2861-1. The book contains 180 verses that discuss the connection between mindfulness and our physical and spiritual wellbeing and can lead to healing and transformation.
- Letting Everything Become Your Teacher: 100 Lessons in Mindfulness. Dell Publishing Company, 2009. ISBN 0-385-34323-X.
- The Mind's Own Physician: A Scientific Dialogue with the Dalai Lama on the Healing Power of Meditation, co-authored with Richard Davidson (New Harbinger, 2012) (based on the 13th Mind and Life Institute Dialogue in 2005).
- Mindfulness for Beginners: reclaiming the present moment - and your life. Sounds True, Inc., 2012. ISBN 978-1-60407-753-7.

== See also ==
- Full Catastrophe Living
- Mindfulness-based stress reduction (MBSR)
