= List of Carroll Pioneers head football coaches =

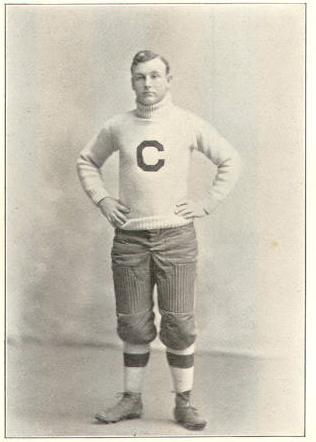
Jack Fries was first a player and then later head coach at Carroll.

The Carroll Pioneers football program is a college football team that represents Carroll University in the Midwest Conference, a part of NCAA Division III. The team has had 28 head coaches since its first recorded football game in 1896. The current coach is Mike Budziszewski who first took the position for the 2020 season. Former head coach Matty Bell was elected to the College Football Hall of Fame in 1955.

== Key ==
Key to symbols in coaches list
General		Overall		Conference		Postseason (Note: Although the first Rose Bowl Game was played in 1902, it has been continuously played since the 1916 game, and is recognized as the oldest bowl game by the NCAA. "—" indicates any season prior to 1916 when postseason games were not played.)	
No.	Order of coaches (Note: A running total of the number of head coaches, with coaches who served separate tenures being counted only once. Interim head coaches are represented with "Int" and are not counted in the running total. "—" indicates the team played but either without a coach or no coach is on record. "X" indicates an interim year without play.)	GC	Games coached	CW	Conference wins	PW	Postseason wins
DC	Division championships	OW	Overall wins	CL	Conference losses	PL	Postseason losses
CC	Conference championships	OL	Overall losses	CT	Conference ties	PT	Postseason ties
NC	National championships	OT	Overall ties (Note: Overtime rules in college football were introduced in 1996, making ties impossible in the period since.)	C%	Conference winning percentage		
†	Elected to the College Football Hall of Fame	O%	Overall winning percentage (Note: When computing the win–loss percentage, a tie counts as half a win and half a loss.)				

== Coaches ==
No.	Name	Term	GC	OW	OL	OT	O%	CW	CL	CT	C%	PW	PL	CCs	Awards
1	Ward A. Wescott	1896	10	5	3	2	.600	—	—	—	—	—	—	—	—
2	J. G. Britton	1898	10	3	5	2	.400	—	—	—	—	—	—	—	—
3	John D. Schwender	1899–1905	26	15	9	2	.615	—	—	—	—	—	—	—	—
4	Mark D. Nave	1901–1903	19	8	7	4	.526	—	—	—	—	—	—	—	—
5	Harrison McJohnston	1908	6	1	5	0	.167	—	—	—	—	—	—	—	—
6	Wilfred C. Bleamaster	1909–1911	20	12	6	2	.650	—	—	—	—	—	—	—	—
7	William Davies	1912	9	2	6	1	.278	—	—	—	—	—	—	—	—
8	Henry W. Lever	1913	7	2	2	3	.500	—	—	—	—	—	—	—	—
9	John Edmund Fries	1914–1920	30	11	14	5	.450	—	—	—	—	—	—	—	—
10	Roy E. Haberman	1919	7	4	3	0	.571	—	—	—	—	—	—	—	—
11	C. C. Boone	1921	7	1	6	0	.143	—	—	—	—	—	—	—	—
12	Matty Bell^{†}	1922	7	3	4	0	.429	—	—	—	—	—	—	—	—
13	Norris Armstrong	1923–1930	61	44	11	6	.770	—	—	—	—	—	—	—	—
14	Vincent P. Batha	1931	6	1	4	1	.250	—	—	—	—	—	—	—	—
15	Glenn Thistlethwaite	1932–1933	13	10	2	1	.808	—	—	—	—	—	—	—	—
16	Elmer A. Lampe	1934–1937	28	17	7	4	.679	—	—	—	—	—	—	—	—
17	John W. Breen	1938–1948	62	34	22	6	.597	—	—	—	—	—	—	—	—
18	Francis J. McCormick	1949–1957	69	37	31	1	.543	—	—	—	—	—	—	—	—
19	Lisle Blackbourn	1958	8	6	2	0	.750	—	—	—	—	—	—	—	—
20	Vince DiFrancesca	1959–1971	110	62	43	5	.586	—	—	—	—	—	—	—	—
21	Steve Miller	1972–1976	46	30	15	1	.663	—	—	—	—	—	—	—	—
22	Robert Larsen	1977	9	4	5	0	.444	—	—	—	—	—	—	—	—
23	Mark W. Williams	1978–1981	36	12	24	0	.333	—	—	—	—	—	—	—	—
24	Merle Masonholder	1978–2000	175	88	87	0	.503	—	—	—	—	—	—	—	—
25	Jeff Voris	2001–2005	49	15	34	0	.306	—	—	—	—	—	—	—	—
26	Henny Hiemenz	2006–2010	53	30	23	0	.566	—	—	—	—	—	—	—	—
27	Mark Krzykowski	2011–2019	90	42	48	0	.467	—	—	—	—	—	—	—	—
28	Mike Budziszewski	2020–present	50	26	24	0	.520	—	—	—	—	—	—	—	—

== Details ==
The following are details on coaches that do not have articles on Wikipedia. For coaches with articles on Wikipedia, see links in the table above.

=== Ward A. Wescott ===
==== Playing history ====
===== Oconto Eleven =====
Wescott played for the Oconto, Wisconsin town team in 1895 and played a game against the team that would become the Green Bay Packers. Wescott was both a player and trainer, receiving accolades for his abilities to teach the game as well as to play.

==== Coaching history ====
===== Carroll College =====
Wescott was the second head coach at Carroll and he held that position for the 1896 season. Preliminary reports predicted a "lively" season. Wescott's players were predicted as promising before the season began.

Controversy was stirred up after a game against Milwaukee East High School on October 17, 1896. Carroll won the game 4-0, but the opposing team disputed the result. The next season's game was cancelled because Carroll was regularly using "ringers" or players that were brought in to the team from outside the school specifically to win games.

===== High school =====
Wescott later went on to coach the successful Eau Claire, Wisconsin high school team in 1902.

=== J. G. Britton ===
Britton was the head coach during a game witnessed by Miss Anna Sackett, who found the game to be so brutal that she revoked $5,000 (a sizeable sum at the time) from her will that had been bequested to Carroll College. She claimed that the "players were brutes" and would no longer support the school if they continued play. Later that same year (October 29), she died and left none of the funds to the college.

=== Charles C. Boone ===
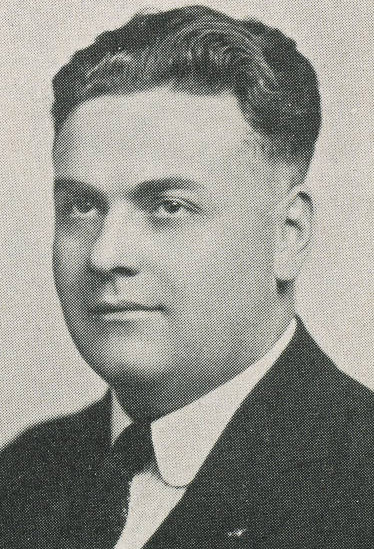
Boone pictured in The Hinakaga 1922, Carroll yearbook

While Boone was the coach, college president William Arthur Ganfield boasted that within four years' time Carroll would be beating the Wisconsin Badgers in football. In his one year of coaching, the team fell far short of that mark with its one win for the season and was outscored by 119 to 14 and left fans and the school administration sorely disappointed.

=== Vincent P. Batha ===
Vincent P. Batha, head football coach 1931

==== Athletics ====
===== Playing history =====
Batha played tackle for Carroll. The school honored his legacy by inducting him into their "Hall of Fame" in 1973 as a "charter member" of the group.

===== Coaching history =====
Batha later became the 16th head football coach for his alma mater and he held that position for the 1931 season. His career coaching record at Carroll College was 1 win, 4 losses, and 1 tie. This ranks him 26th at Carroll College in total wins and 25th at Carroll College in winning percentage. He would remain with the program as assistant coach under Glenn Thistlethwaite beginning in 1932. Coach Batha's poor performance was called the worst start in seven years for the program, which was attributed to weakness at the end positions and turnover in the backfield.

Batha also was the head basketball coach at Carroll from 1931 until 1934, posting the 12th-most wins at the history of the school (as of 2007-2008 season) with a record of 29-13. He also was assistant Athletic Director and head coach of the track and field and cross country running teams.

==== Academics ====
While at Carroll, Batha also was an instructor of physics, mathematics, and physical education. Carroll college set up a memorial carillon in his memory. One of his greatest joys was helping young men succeed in college and life.

Batha earned a Master of Science from the University of Wisconsin in 1929 and completed research on platinum and its reflective power as varied by temperature.

During World War II, Batha served as a flight instructor at Carroll for the United States Army Air Corps. The eight-week curriculum consisted of mathematics, navigation, and aviation operation. The program was coordinated through the college and taught at Waukesha County Airport.

==== Personal life ====
Batha was very active in the Boy Scouts of America and was awarded the Silver Beaver in 1949. He was also active with the Kiwanis organization. He was killed in an automobile accident on December 21, 1956.
