= Jordan Brangers =

American professional basketball player

Personal information
- Born: January 1, 1995 (age 31) Radcliff, Kentucky
- Listed height: 6 ft 2 in (1.88 m)
- Listed weight: 200 lb (91 kg)

Career information
- High school: North Hardin (Radcliff, Kentucky); Eastern (Louisville, Kentucky)
- College: South Plains (2016–2018)
- NBA draft: 2018: undrafted
- Playing career: 2018–2022
- Position: Point guard / shooting guard

Career history
- 2018–2019: Eisbären Bremerhaven
- 2020: Rayos de Hermosillo
- 2020: Randers Cimbria
- 2022: Rayos de Hermosillo

Career highlights
- CIBACOPA All-Star (2022); First-team NJCAA Division I All-American (2017); WJCAC Player of the Year (2017); 2× First-team All-WJCAC (2017, 2018); WJCAC Freshman of the Year (2017)

Jordan Brangers (born January 1, 1995) is an American basketball coach and a retired professional player. He played for South Plains College for two seasons before playing professionally in Germany and Mexico.

== High school career ==
Brangers first played high school basketball for North Hardin High School in Radcliff, Kentucky. He transferred to Eastern High School in Louisville, Kentucky but dropped out before his graduation. Over three years later, he earned his General Educational Development (GED) degree, allowing him to attend college.

== College career ==
After a one-year break from basketball, Brangers began attended St. Catharine College in Saint Catharine, Kentucky, which competed in the National Association of Intercollegiate Athletics (NAIA), but was ruled ineligible. He transferred to Motlow State Community College, a member of the National Junior College Athletic Association (NJCAA), but was sidelined again over eligibility issues.

In the 2016–17 season, Brangers played basketball for South Plains College in Levelland, Texas, where he competed in the NJCAA. Through 34 games, he averaged 20.9 points, 3.1 rebounds, and 1.2 assists per game, shooting 46.2% from the three-point line. He broke the school record for three-pointers in a season, posting 151. On February 16, 2017, Brangers scored a career-high 38 points, with a school-record 10 three-pointers, in a 108–69 rout of New Mexico Military Institute. After leading South Plains to a third-place finish at the NJCAA Men's Division I Basketball Championship, he garnered NJCAA First-Team All-American honors. In addition, he was named Western Junior College Athletic Conference (WJCAC) and NJCAA Region 5 Player of the Year.

Brangers averaged 16 points, 2.9 rebounds, and 2.3 assists per game, shooting 39.9% from three-point range, in 2017–18. On November 11, 2017, he matched his career-best of 38 points, with 10 three-pointers, in a 104–78 win over Coastal Bend College. He scored 38 points again on November 18, leading South Plains to a 100–79 victory over Collin College. Brangers was sidelined for the NJCAA Tournament with a staph infection in his knee, but his team still won the national championship. He earned All-Region 5 and NJCAA All-American honorable mention accolades.

=== Recruitment ===
On November 9, 2016, during his first season at South Plains, Brangers signed a letter of intent to play for Texas Tech at the NCAA Division I level. However, in April 2017, he announced that he would not play for Texas Tech because he wanted to live closer to his grandmother, who was "not doing well," in Radcliff, Kentucky. In that month, Brangers committed and signed with Western Kentucky but it was revealed in August that he had failed to meet National Collegiate Athletic Association (NCAA) transfer requirements. In November 2017, he committed to Colorado State as the third-best junior college recruit in the nation, according to 247Sports. In February 2018, Brangers said that he would not join Colorado State.

== Professional career ==
On March 27, 2018, Brangers declared for the 2018 NBA draft without hiring an agent. On April 10, he signed with an agent, preventing him from returning to college. In July 2018, Brangers drew attention for his high-scoring performances in the Miami Pro League, where he faced several National Basketball Association (NBA) players. In his first three games, he scored 43, 48, and 40 points respectively.

On July 27, 2018, Brangers signed his first professional contract with Eisbären Bremerhaven of the Basketball Bundesliga (BBL), the top league in Germany. In 10 games played for Bremerhaven, he averaged 12.7 points, 1.9 rebounds and 1.7 assists in 26 minutes per game.

On September 24, 2019, Brangers signed a one-year deal with Hapoel Ramat Gan Givatayim of the Israel National League. One month later, he parted ways with the Urduns before appearing in a game of them. In the 2020 CIBACOPA season, he appeared in two games for the Rayos de Hermosillo, averaging 26 points, 5 Rebounds and 3 assists a game, before the season ended due to the COVID-19 pandemic. In July 2020, he was signed by the Danish club Randers Cimbria, but finally did not appear in any game for the team.

Brangers returned to Rayos de Hermosillo for the 2022 CIBACOPA season. He earned All-Star honors.

== Coaching career ==
In 2025, Brangers was announced to become the next head coach for the Adair County High School (Kentucky) boys' basketball team.
