= Mark Williams =

Mark Williams may refer to:

== Entertainment ==
- Mark Williams (writer) (born 1951), New Zealander academic, writer, critic, poet
- Mark Williams (singer) (born 1953), New Zealander singer
  - Mark Williams (album)
- Mark Williams (actor), English actor and comedian
- Mark "Slave" Williams (born 1971), New Zealander hip hop MC, television presenter
- Mark Williams (organist) (born 1978), Informator Choristarum at Magdalen College, Oxford
- Mark Williams (radio host), American journalist and radio personality
- Mark Williams (game designer), original artist at Hero Games
- Mark Williams (Holby City), fictional character in Holby City
- Mark Williams (filmmaker), American producer, director and writer
- Mark Williams (music producer), American music producer and songwriter
- Mark Williams, birth name of Mark Ardington (1976–2024), British visual effects artist

== Sports ==
=== Association football ===
- Mark Williams (South African footballer) (born 1966), South African former international footballer
- Mark Williams (footballer, born 1970), Northern Ireland former international footballer
- Mark Williams (footballer, born 1978), English footballer for Rochdale and Rotherham United
- Mark Williams (footballer, born 1981), English footballer who played as a midfielder
- Mark Williams (Scottish footballer) (born 1995), Scottish footballer

=== Australian rules football ===
- Mark Williams (Australian footballer, born 1957), with North Melbourne and Footscray
- Mark Williams (Australian footballer, born 1958), with Port Adelaide, Brisbane, Collingwood, former coach of Port Adelaide
- Mark Williams (Australian footballer, born 1964), with Carlton and Footscray, former coach of Sandringham
- Mark Williams (Australian footballer, born 1983), with Hawthorn and Essendon

=== Other sports ===
- Mark Williams (American football) (born 1971), American football player
- Mark Williams (basketball) (born 2001), American basketball player
- Mark Williams (baseball) (born 1953), American former baseball player
- Mark Williams (bowling) (born 1958), American retired professional 10-pin bowler
- Mark Williams (bowls), Welsh former world bowls champion
- Mark Williams (cricketer, born 1955), English cricketer
- Mark Williams (rugby union) (born 1961), American rugby union player
- Mark Williams (snooker player) (born 1975), Welsh professional snooker player
- Mark Williams (volleyball) (born 1979), Australian volleyball player

== Other ==
- Mark Williams (Colorado politician) (born 1962)
- Mark Williams (politician) (born 1966), British Member of Parliament and Welsh Liberal Democrat leader
- Mark W. Williams (1925–2013), US Army Ranger and participant in D-Day
- Mark London Williams (born 1959), American author and journalist
- Mark T. Williams (born 1963), American educator, author and risk management expert
- J. Mark G. Williams, British academic and author specializing in depression and suicide
- Mark Williams (engineer) (born 1959), British engineer

== See also ==
- Mark Williams Company, a small software company that created Coherent
- Marc Williams (born 1988), Welsh footballer
- Marcus Williams (disambiguation)
