= John D. Schwender =

American football coach

Coaching career (HC unless noted)
- 1899–1900: Carroll (WI)
- 1904–1905: Carroll (WI)

Head coaching record
- Overall: 15–9–2

John D. Schwender was an American college football coach. Due to significant injuries to his players during practice, the faculty of his school forced the discontinuation of the football program for one year.

== Carroll College ==
Schwender was the fifth head football coach at Carroll College in Waukesha, Wisconsin and he held that position for two seasons, from 1899 until 1900 and then returning from 1904 until 1905. His career coaching record at Carroll College was 15–9–2.

== Discontinuation of 1903 ==
Carroll college hired Mark D. Nave as head coach after Schwender stepped down. Due to an abundance of injuries during football practice in 1903, the school started to disband the program. Five students were injured in a ten-day period. The incident was deemed so severe that the school chose to forbid the game. The decision was made after voting first by the football team and then of the students of the college. At first, both the players and students voted to keep playing against the wishes of the faculty. The student body eventually gave in to the faculty demands and the team was forced to disband.

The team reorganized and play picked back up for the next season in 1904 with coach Schwender taking over as head coach.
