= Ray Wendland =

American chemist (1911–1986)

Ray T. Wendland
- Born: July 11, 1911; Minneapolis, Minnesota, U.S.
- Died: November 30, 1986 (age 75); Waukesha, Wisconsin, U.S.
- Education: Carleton College (B.A.); Iowa State University (Ph.D.)
- Known for: Research in petrochemistry
- Scientific career
- Fields: Chemistry
- Workplaces: Carnegie-Mellon University, University of Minnesota, North Dakota State University, Coe College, Lehigh University, Winona State University, Carroll University

Ray Theodore Wendland (July 11, 1911 – November 30, 1986) was an American experimental chemist and academician.

== Education ==
Wendland was born in Minneapolis, Minnesota in July, 1911, and educated at Carleton College in Northfield, Minnesota, receiving a B.A. degree in chemistry in 1933. From there, he matriculated to Iowa State University, Ames, Iowa, to pursue graduate studies. He was awarded a Ph.D. from that institution in 1937. Postdoctoral appointments followed at Carnegie Technical Institute (now Carnegie Mellon University) in Pittsburgh, Pennsylvania, and the University of Minnesota in Minneapolis, centering on the refinement of rubber production under the auspices of the U.S. War Production Board. This work continued through World War II and contributed to the effectiveness of the war effort on the homefront.

== Academic career ==
Between 1945 and 1955, Wendland served on the faculties of Coe College in Cedar Rapids, Iowa; Lehigh University in Bethlehem, Pennsylvania; and North Dakota State University in Fargo, North Dakota. He taught and continued research on petrochemical development throughout that time. In 1955 he returned to Carnegie Mellon as a senior research fellow in petrochemistry. He then took a position on the faculty of Winona State University in Winona, Minnesota in 1958, as chairman of its science department, and from there moved to Carroll College (now Carroll University) in Waukesha, Wisconsin, in 1961, as professor and chair of the chemistry department. Wendland remained there for the rest of his working life. Wendland published several professional papers in organic chemistry and chemistry education during his career. He also authored two texts entitled Petrochemicals: The New World of Synthetics and Systematic Use of Chemical Literature. Wendland was a member of the American Chemical Society, the American Association for the Advancement of Science, the American Association of University Professors, and Sigma Xi (a scientific research society).

== Retirement and death ==
After retirement in 1976, Wendland continued to serve as a private consultant for petrochemical firms in the United States. He died in November, 1986, and is buried in Waukesha.
