= Mark Krzykowski =

American football player, coach, and college athletics administrator

Current position
- Title: Assistant athletic director
- Team: Carroll (WI)
- Conference: CCIW

Biographical details
- Born: c. 1970

Playing career
- 1991–1993: Carroll (WI)

Coaching career (HC unless noted)
- 2006–2007: Carroll (WI) (DC)
- 2008–2010: Carroll (WI) (AHC/DC)
- 2011–2019: Carroll (WI)

Administrative career (AD unless noted)
- 2019–present: Carroll (WI) (assistant AD)

Head coaching record
- Overall: 42–48

Mark Krzykowski (born c. 1970) is an American college athletics administrator and former college football coach. He is an assistant athletic director at Carroll University in Waukesha, Wisconsin, a position he has held since November 2019. Krzykowski served as the head football coach at Carroll from 2011 to 2019. He was named the head football coach at Carroll the 2011 season, replacing Henny Hiemenz who resigned in 2010.

== Head coaching record ==
Year	Team	Overall	Conference	Standing	Bowl/playoffs
Carroll Pioneers (Midwest Conference) (2011–2015)
2011	Carroll	7–3	6–3	4th	
2012	Carroll	8–2	7–2	4th	
2013	Carroll	6–4	5–4	T–6th	
2014	Carroll	8–2	4–1	2nd (North)	
2015	Carroll	6–4	4–1	2nd (North)	
Carroll Pioneers (College Conference of Illinois and Wisconsin) (2016–2019)
2016	Carroll	1–9	1–7	8th	
2017	Carroll	1–9	1–7	T–8th	
2018	Carroll	3–7	2–7	8th	
2019	Carroll	2–8	1–8	T–8th	
Carroll:		42–48	31–40		
Total:		42–48			
