= 2018 NBA draft =

Basketball player selection

General information
- Sport: Basketball
- Date: June 21, 2018
- Location: Barclays Center (Brooklyn, New York)
- Networks: ESPN; ABC (first round only)

Overview
- 60 total selections in 2 rounds
- League: NBA
- Teams: 30
- First selection: Deandre Ayton (Phoenix Suns)

The 2018 NBA Draft was held on June 21, 2018, at Barclays Center in Brooklyn, New York. National Basketball Association teams took turns selecting amateur United States college basketball players and other eligible players, including international players. It was televised nationally by ESPN. State Farm was the presenting sponsor of the NBA draft for the seventh consecutive year. This draft was the last to use the original weighted lottery system that gave teams near the bottom of the NBA draft better odds at the top three picks of the draft while teams higher up had worse odds in the process; the rule was agreed upon by the NBA on September 28, 2017, but would not be implemented until the 2019 draft. It was also considered the final year where undrafted college underclassmen were forced to begin their professional careers early; on August 8, 2018, the NCAA announced that players who declared for the NBA draft and were not selected would have the opportunity to return to their school for at least another year. With the last year of what was, at the time, the most recent lottery system (with the NBA draft lottery being held in Chicago instead of in New York), the Phoenix Suns won the first overall pick on May 15, 2018, with the Sacramento Kings at the second overall pick and the Atlanta Hawks at third overall pick. The Suns' selection was their first No. 1 overall selection in franchise history. They used the selection on the Bahamian center Deandre Ayton from the nearby University of Arizona.

This draft was also notable for its lack of draft-day trades involving NBA veterans. An average of more than five veterans per year were traded on the day of the last three drafts, but this draft was the first since 2003 in which no such trades were announced. At the end of the 2018–19 season the top 5 picks from the draft were picked as the All-Rookie 1st Team, the first time this had happened since the 1984 draft.

== Draft selections ==
PG	Point guard	SG	Shooting guard	SF	Small forward	PF	Power forward	C	Center

*	Denotes player who has been selected for at least one All-Star Game and All-NBA Team
^{+}	Denotes player who has been selected for at least one All-Star Game
^{#}	Denotes player who has never appeared in an NBA regular-season or playoff game
^{~}	Denotes player who has been selected as Rookie of the Year

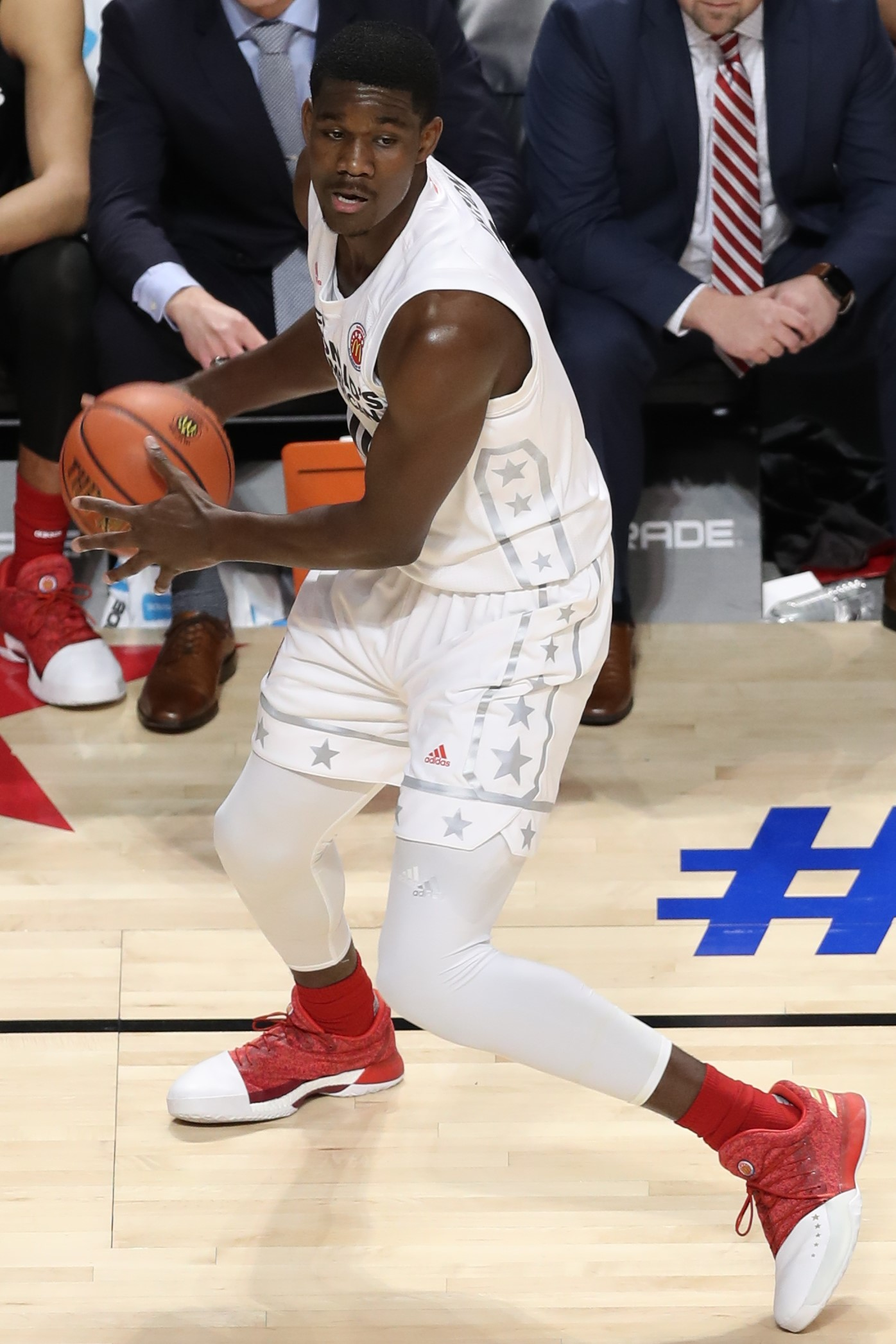
Deandre Ayton was selected 1st overall by the Phoenix Suns.

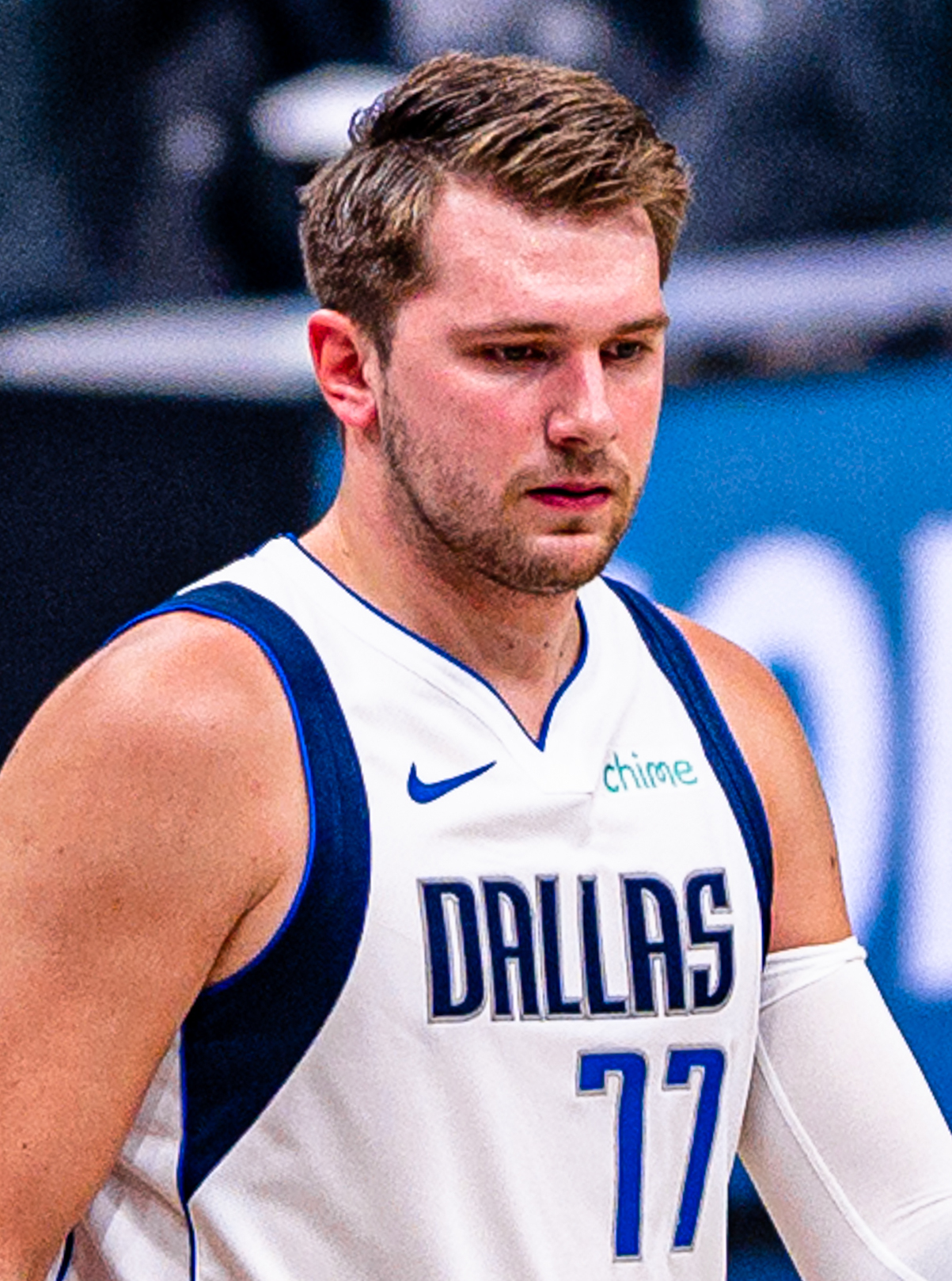
Luka Dončić was selected 3rd overall by the Atlanta Hawks (traded to the Dallas Mavericks). He has been named to 6 All-NBA first teams and has had 6 All-Star appearances.

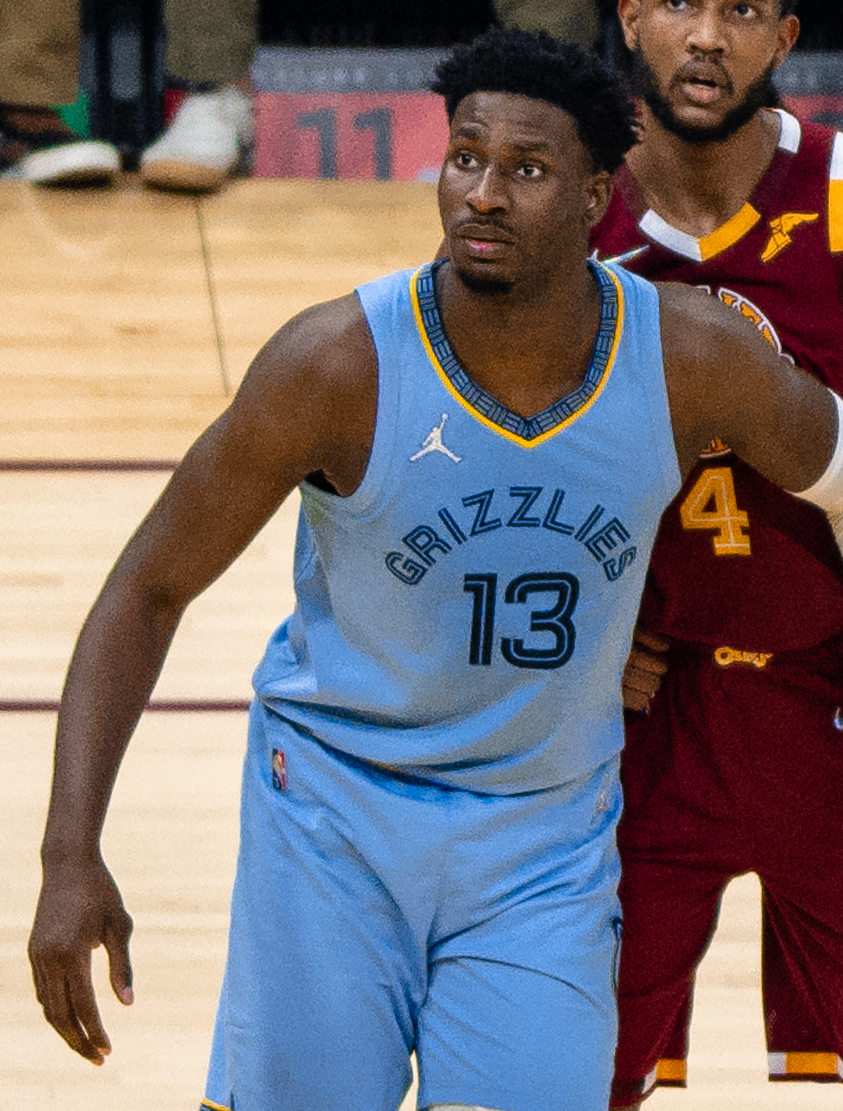
Jaren Jackson Jr. was selected 4th overall by the Memphis Grizzlies. He was named the Defensive Player of the Year in his fifth season.

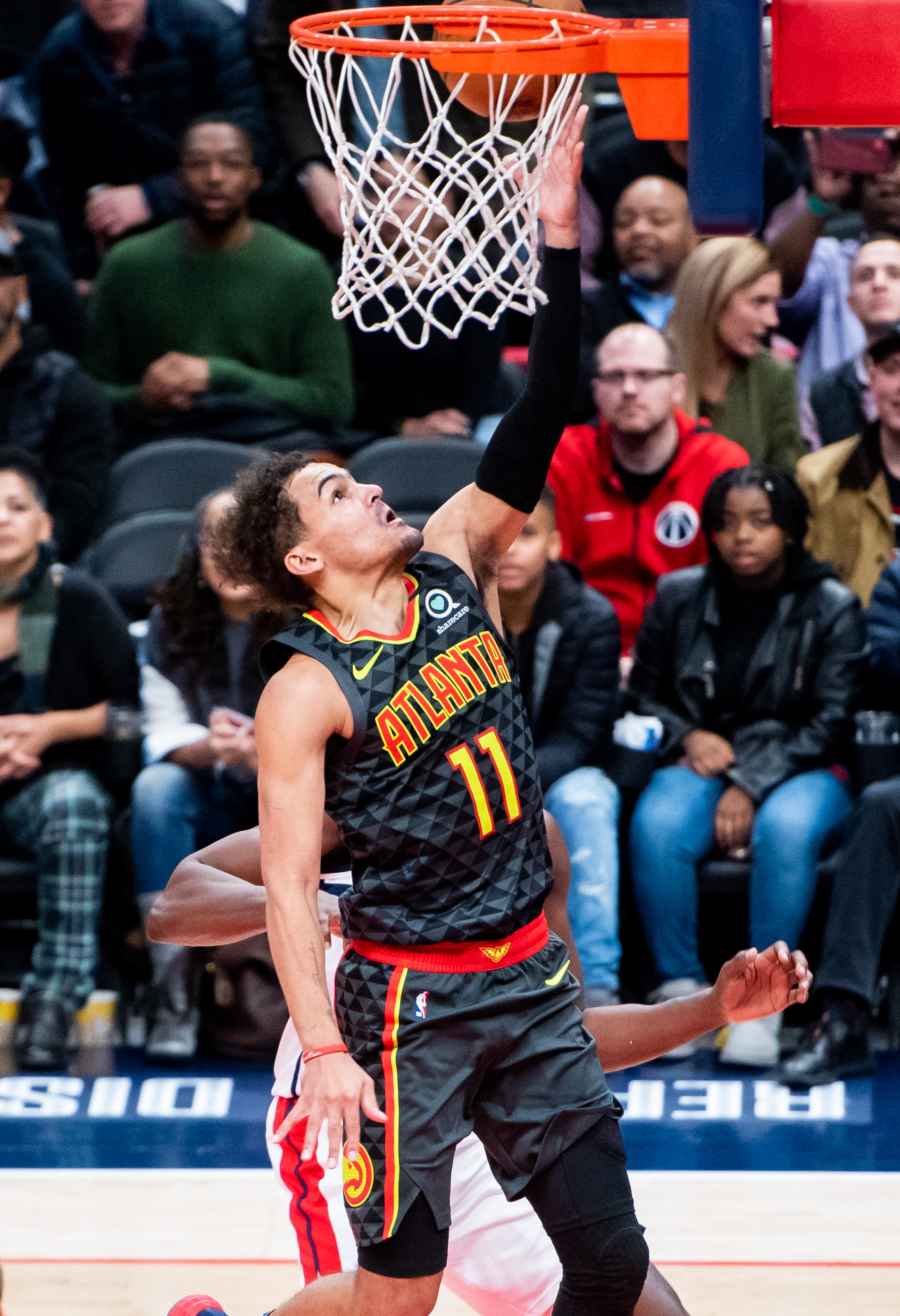
Trae Young was selected 5th overall by the Dallas Mavericks (traded to the Atlanta Hawks). He has been named to an All-NBA third team and has had 4 All-Star appearances.

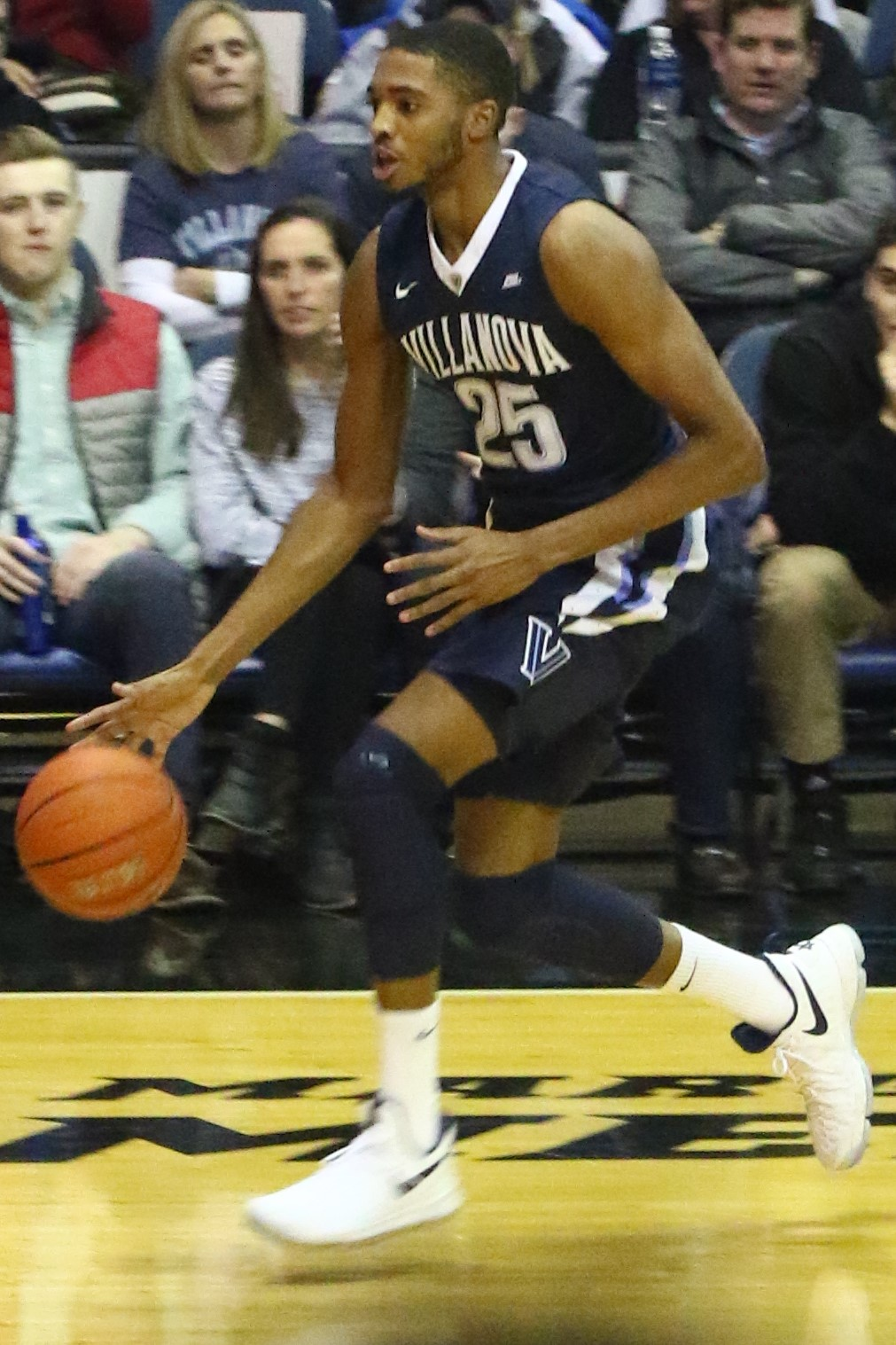
Mikal Bridges was selected 10th overall by the Philadelphia 76ers (traded to the Phoenix Suns).

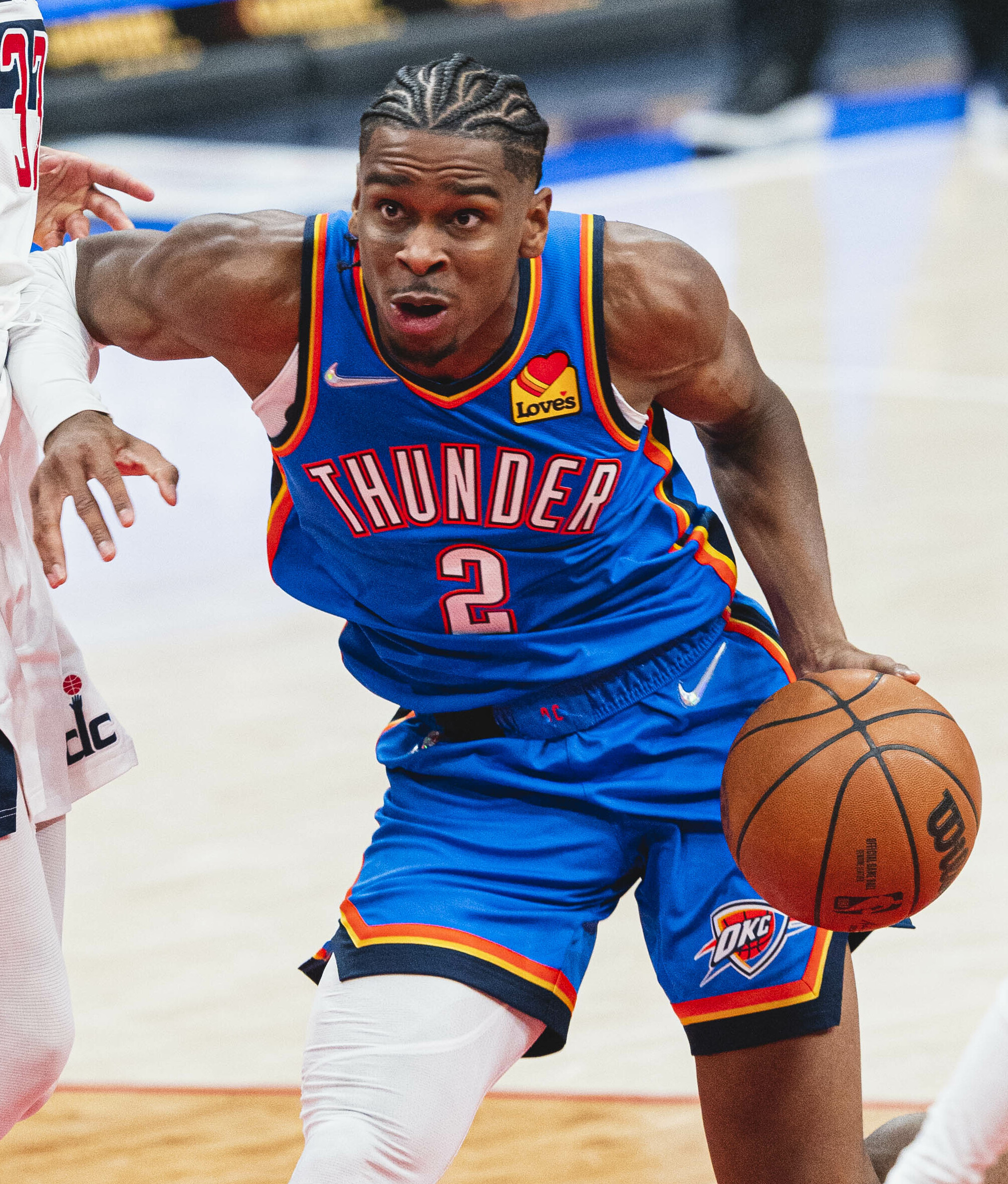
Shai Gilgeous-Alexander was selected 11th overall by the Charlotte Hornets (traded to the Los Angeles Clippers). He led the league in scoring, is a two time MVP and won an NBA championship in his seventh season.

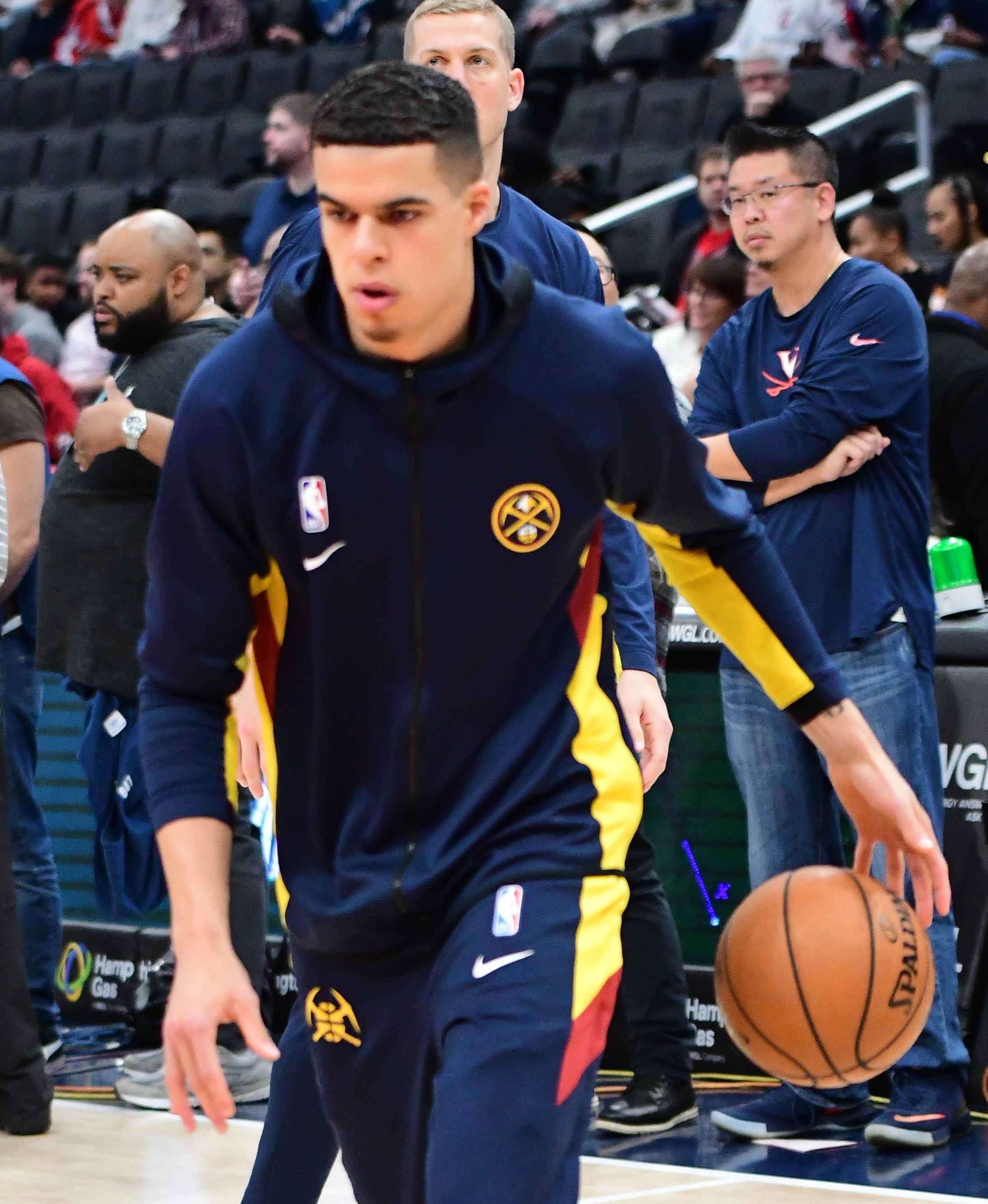
Michael Porter Jr. was selected 14th overall by the Denver Nuggets.

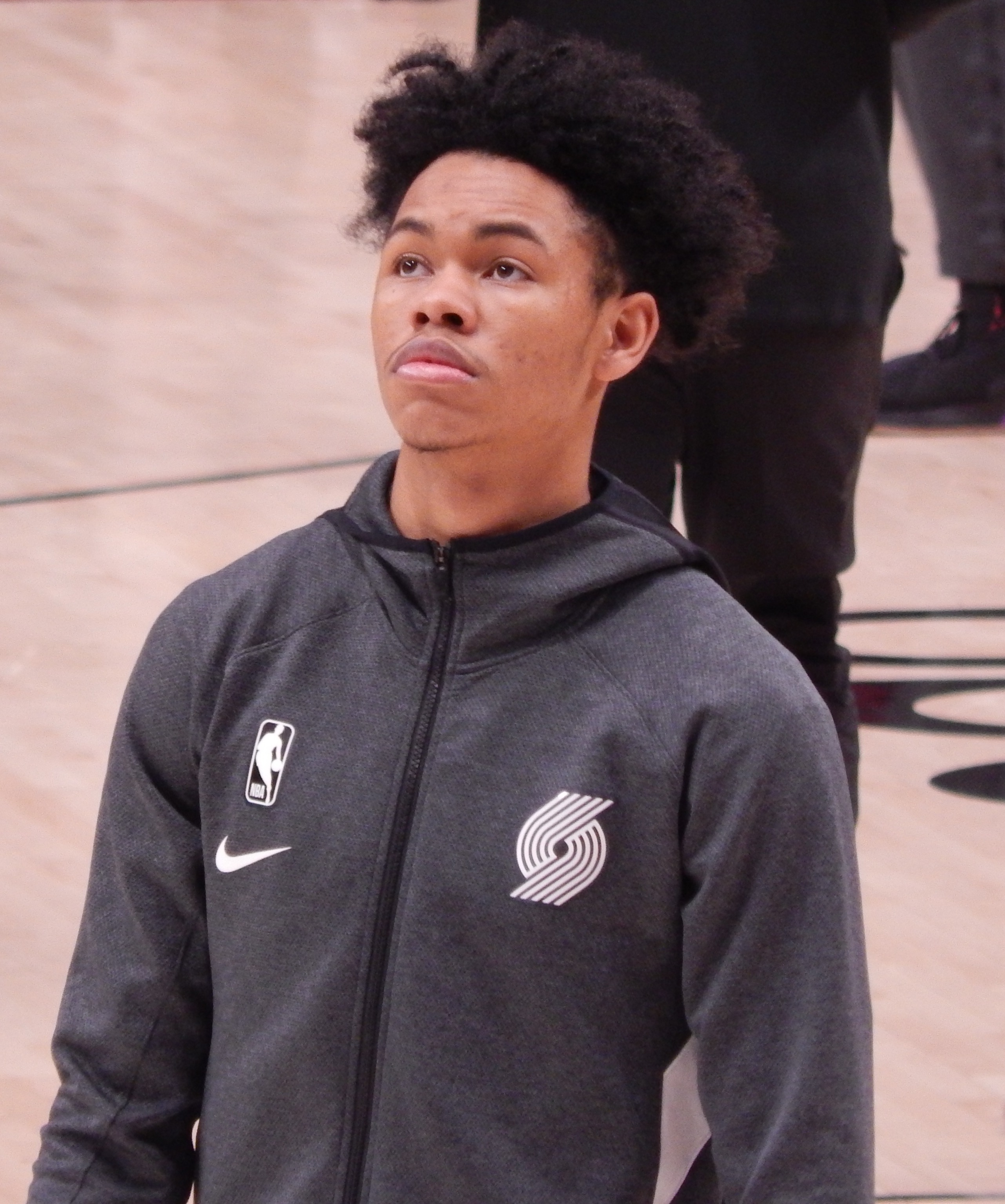
Anfernee Simons was selected 24th overall by the Portland Trail Blazers.

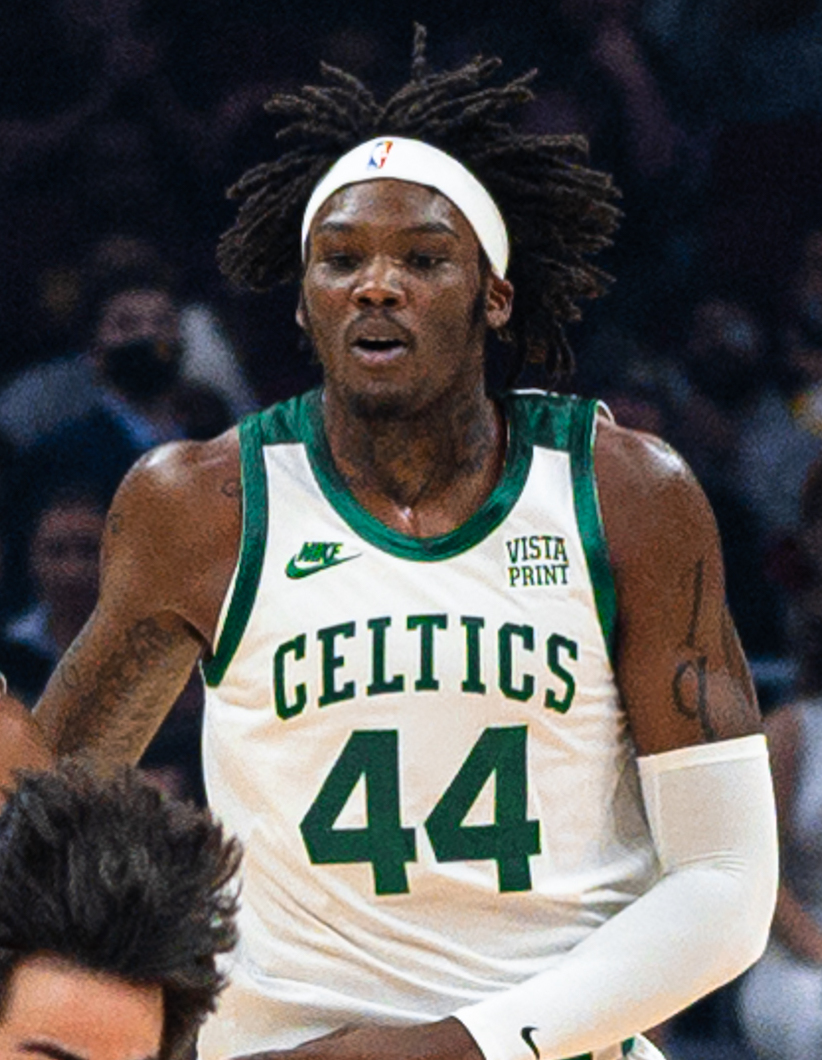
Robert Williams III was selected 27th overall by the Boston Celtics.

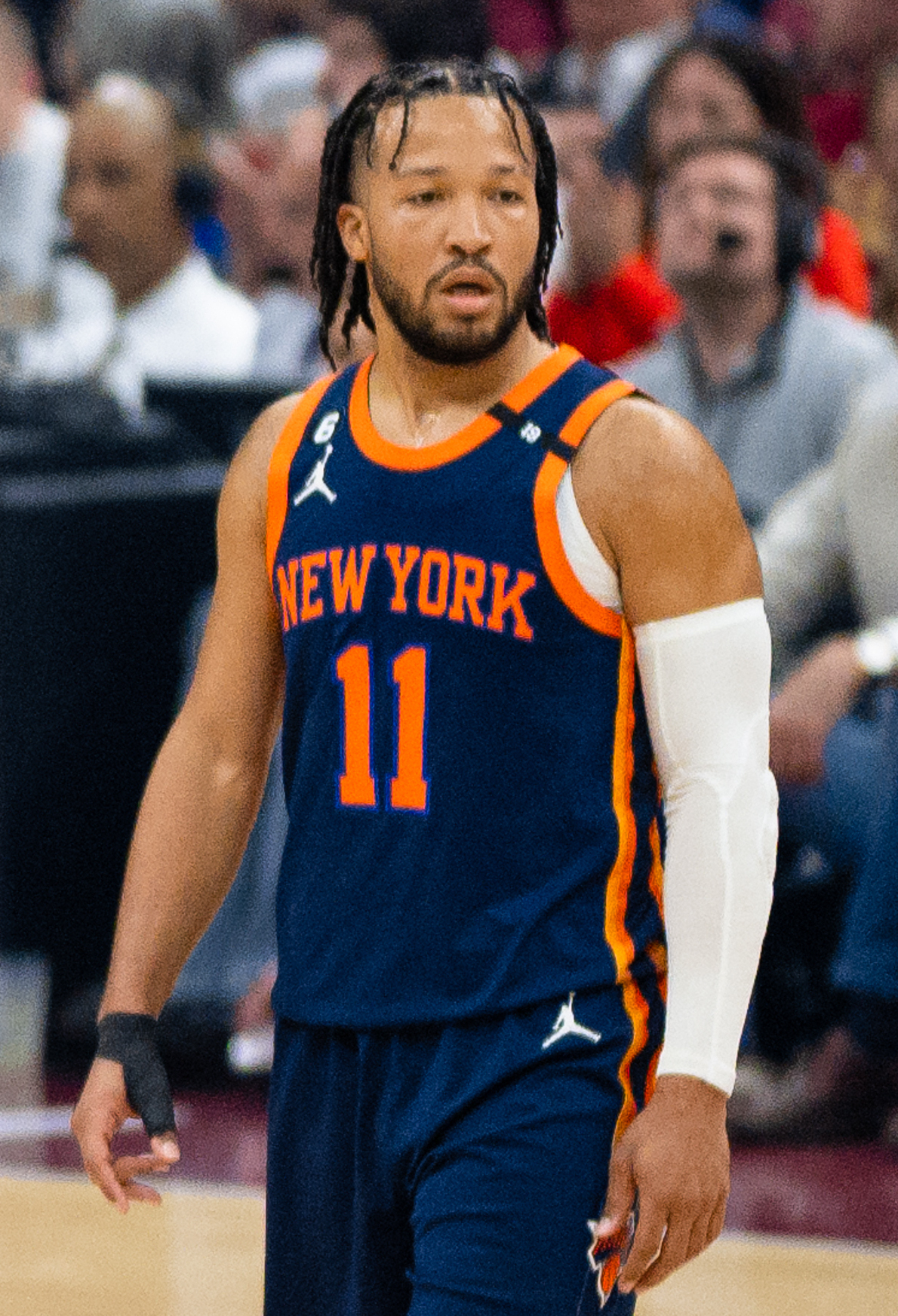
Jalen Brunson was selected 33rd overall by the Dallas Mavericks. He has been named to 3 All-NBA teams and has had 3 All-Star appearances. In 2026, he won the NBA Championship and Finals MVP with the Knicks.

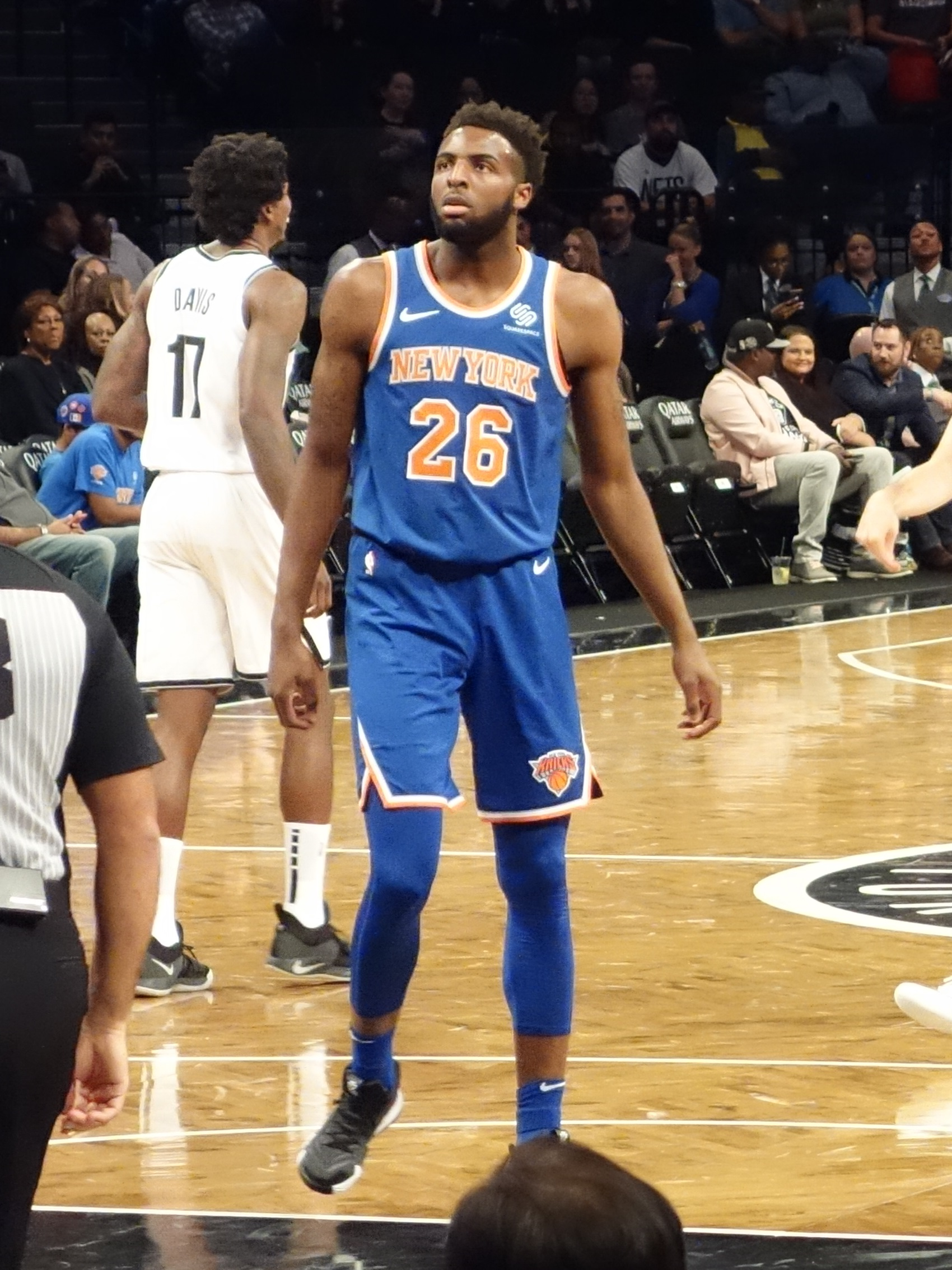
Mitchell Robinson was selected 36th overall by the New York Knicks.

Rnd.	Pick	Player	Pos.	Nationality (Note: Nationality indicates the player's national team or representative nationality. If a player has not competed at the international level, then the nationality indicates the national team which the player is eligible to represent according to FIBA rules.)	Team	School / club team
1	1	Deandre Ayton	C	Bahamas	Phoenix Suns	Arizona (Fr.)
1	2	Marvin Bagley III	PF	United States	Sacramento Kings	Duke (Fr.)
1	3	Luka Dončić^{*~}	PG/SF	Slovenia	Atlanta Hawks (traded to Dallas) (Note: June 21, 2018: Atlanta Hawks to Dallas Mavericks: Dallas acquired Atlanta's first-round pick (No. 3 – Luka Dončić); Atlanta acquired Dallas' first-round pick (No. 5 – Trae Young) and a protected 2019 first-round selection)	Real Madrid (Spain)
1	4	Jaren Jackson Jr.^{+}	PF/C	United States	Memphis Grizzlies	Michigan State (Fr.)
1	5	Trae Young^{*}	PG	United States	Dallas Mavericks (traded to Atlanta)	Oklahoma (Fr.)
1	6	Mo Bamba	C	United States (Note: Bamba was born in the United States to Ivorian parents. A dual citizen, he played for the United States at the youth level. Bamba is eligible for the Ivory Coast national basketball team but has not appeared in a game.)	Orlando Magic	Texas (Fr.)
1	7	Wendell Carter Jr.	C	United States	Chicago Bulls	Duke (Fr.)
1	8	Collin Sexton	PG/SG	United States	Cleveland Cavaliers (from Brooklyn via Boston) (Note: July 12, 2013: Brooklyn Nets to Boston Celtics: Boston acquired Gerald Wallace, Kris Humphries, Keith Bogans, MarShon Brooks, Kris Joseph, a 2014 first-round pick, a 2016 first-round pick, the option to swap 2017 first-round picks, and a 2018 first-round pick; Brooklyn acquired Paul Pierce, Kevin Garnett, Jason Terry and D. J. White; Brooklyn also acquired Boston's 2017 second-round pick for compensation after the 2015–16 season ended.; August 30, 2017: Boston Celtics to Cleveland Cavaliers: Cleveland acquired Isaiah Thomas, Jae Crowder, Ante Žižić, the Brooklyn Nets' 2018 first-round pick, and the Miami Heat's 2020 second-round pick (latter pick added as compensation for Thomas' failed physical); Boston acquired Kyrie Irving)	Alabama (Fr.)
1	9	Kevin Knox II	SF	United States	New York Knicks	Kentucky (Fr.)
1	10	Mikal Bridges	SF	United States	Philadelphia 76ers (from L.A. Lakers via Phoenix; (Note: July 7, 2012: Los Angeles Lakers to Phoenix Suns: Phoenix acquired a 2013 first-round pick, a 2013 second-round pick, a 2014 second-round pick, and an unprotected 2018 first-round pick; L.A. Lakers acquired Steve Nash; February 19, 2015: Phoenix Suns to Philadelphia 76ers (three-team trade with Milwaukee): Philadelphia acquired the L.A. Lakers' 2018 first-round pick from Phoenix; Phoenix acquired Brandon Knight and Kendall Marshall from Milwaukee; Milwaukee acquired Michael Carter-Williams from Philadelphia, Miles Plumlee and Tyler Ennis from Phoenix) traded to Phoenix (Note: June 21, 2018: Philadelphia 76ers to Phoenix Suns: Phoenix acquired Philadelphia's first-round pick (No. 10 – Mikal Bridges); Philadelphia acquired Phoenix's first-round pick (No. 16 – Zhaire Smith) and the Miami Heat's 2021 first-round selection))	Villanova (Jr.)
1	11	Shai Gilgeous-Alexander^{*}	PG/SG	Canada	Charlotte Hornets (traded to the L.A. Clippers) (Note: June 21, 2018: Charlotte Hornets to Los Angeles Clippers: Los Angeles Clippers acquired Charlotte's first-round pick (No. 11 – Shai Gilgeous-Alexander); Charlotte acquired the Los Angeles Clippers' first-round pick (No. 12 – Miles Bridges) and two future second-round selections)	Kentucky (Fr.)
1	12	Miles Bridges	SF	United States	Los Angeles Clippers (from Detroit, (Note: January 29, 2018: Detroit Pistons to Los Angeles Clippers: L.A. Clippers acquired Avery Bradley, Tobias Harris, Boban Marjanović, and a top-4 protected 2018 first-round pick; Detroit acquired Blake Griffin, Brice Johnson, and Willie Reed) traded to Charlotte)	Michigan State (So.)
1	13	Jerome Robinson	SG	United States	Los Angeles Clippers	Boston College (Jr.)
1	14	Michael Porter Jr.	SF	United States	Denver Nuggets	Missouri (Fr.)
1	15	Troy Brown Jr.	SF	United States	Washington Wizards	Oregon (Fr.)
1	16	Zhaire Smith	SG	United States	Phoenix Suns (from Miami; (Note: February 19, 2015: Miami Heat to Phoenix Suns (three-team trade with New Orleans Pelicans): Phoenix acquired John Salmons from New Orleans, Danny Granger, a top-7 protected 2018 first-round pick, a 2021 unprotected first-round pick, and a traded player exception from Miami; Miami acquired Goran Dragić and Zoran Dragić from Phoenix; New Orleans acquired Norris Cole, Shawne Williams, Justin Hamilton, and cash considerations from Miami) traded to Philadelphia)	Texas Tech (Fr.)
1	17	Donte DiVincenzo	SG	United States	Milwaukee Bucks	Villanova (So.)
1	18	Lonnie Walker IV	SG	United States	San Antonio Spurs	Miami (Fr.)
1	19	Kevin Huerter	SG	United States	Atlanta Hawks (from Minnesota) (Note: February 10, 2015: Minnesota Timberwolves to Atlanta Hawks: Atlanta acquired a lottery protected 2018 first-round pick; Minnesota acquired Adreian Payne)	Maryland (So.)
1	20	Josh Okogie	SG	Nigeria (Note: Josh Okogie was born in Nigeria and raised in the United States. He played for the Under-19 United States national team in 2017. Okogie plays for the Nigeria national basketball team at the senior level.)	Minnesota Timberwolves (from Oklahoma City via Utah) (Note: February 19, 2015: Oklahoma City Thunder to Utah Jazz (three-team trade with Detroit Pistons): Utah acquired a 2017 second-round pick from Detroit, Kendrick Perkins, Grant Jerrett, the player rights to Tibor Pleiß, and a lottery protected 2018 first-round pick from Oklahoma City; Oklahoma City acquired Enes Kanter and Steve Novak, D. J. Augustin, Kyle Singler, and a 2019 second-round pick from Detroit; Detroit acquired Reggie Jackson; June 30, 2017: Utah Jazz to Minnesota Timberwolves: Minnesota acquired a lottery-protected 2018 Oklahoma City first-round pick; Utah acquired Ricky Rubio)	Georgia Tech (So.)
1	21	Grayson Allen	SG	United States	Utah Jazz	Duke ((Sr.)
1	22	Chandler Hutchison	SF/SG	United States	Chicago Bulls (from New Orleans) (Note: February 1, 2018: New Orleans Pelicans to Chicago Bulls: Chicago acquired Tony Allen, Jameer Nelson, Ömer Aşık, a top-5 protected 2018 first-round pick, and the rights to swap 2021 second-round picks; New Orleans acquired Nikola Mirotić and reacquired their 2018 second-round pick once again)	Boise State (Sr.)
1	23	Aaron Holiday	PG	United States	Indiana Pacers	UCLA (Jr.)
1	24	Anfernee Simons	SG	United States	Portland Trail Blazers	IMG Academy (Bradenton, Florida; HSPg.)
1	25	Moritz Wagner	PF	Germany	Los Angeles Lakers (from Cleveland via Portland and Cleveland) (Note: February 18, 2016: Cleveland Cavaliers to Portland Trail Blazers: Portland acquired Anderson Varejão and a 2018 protected first-round pick; Cleveland acquired a 2020 second-round pick; January 6, 2017: Portland Trail Blazers to Cleveland Cavaliers: Cleveland reacquired their rights to that 2018 protected first-round pick (protections removed); Portland acquired a 2017 first-round pick; February 8, 2018: Cleveland Cavaliers to Los Angeles Lakers: L.A. Lakers acquired Isaiah Thomas, Channing Frye and a top-3 protected 2018 first-round pick; Cleveland acquired Jordan Clarkson and Larry Nance Jr.)	Michigan (Jr.)
1	26	Landry Shamet	SG	United States	Philadelphia 76ers	Wichita State (So.)
1	27	Robert Williams III	PF/C	United States	Boston Celtics	Texas A&M (So.)
1	28	Jacob Evans	SG	United States	Golden State Warriors	Cincinnati (Jr.)
1	29	Džanan Musa	SF	Bosnia and Herzegovina	Brooklyn Nets (from Toronto) (Note: July 13, 2017: Toronto Raptors to Brooklyn Nets: Brooklyn acquired DeMarre Carroll, a lottery protected 2018 first-round pick, and the worst 2018 second-round pick between Orlando and the L.A. Lakers; Toronto acquired Justin Hamilton)	Cedevita Zagreb (Croatia)
1	30	Omari Spellman	PF	United States	Atlanta Hawks (from Houston via L.A. Clippers) (Note: June 28, 2017: Houston Rockets to Los Angeles Clippers: L.A. Clippers acquired Patrick Beverley, Sam Dekker, Montrezl Harrell, Darrun Hilliard, DeAndre Liggins, Lou Williams, Kyle Wiltjer, and a top-3 protected 2018 first-round pick; Houston acquired Chris Paul; July 7, 2017: Los Angeles Clippers to Atlanta Hawks (three-team trade with Denver Nuggets): Atlanta acquired Jamal Crawford, Diamond Stone, a top-3 protected 2018 Houston first-round pick and cash considerations from the L.A. Clippers; L.A. Clippers acquired Danilo Gallinari from Denver; Denver acquired the Washington Wizards' 2019 second-round pick from Atlanta)	Villanova (Fr.)
2	31	Élie Okobo	PG	France	Phoenix Suns	Pau-Lacq-Orthez (France)
2	32	Jevon Carter	PG	United States	Memphis Grizzlies	West Virginia (Sr.)
2	33	Jalen Brunson^{*}	PG	United States	Dallas Mavericks	Villanova (Jr.)
2	34	Devonte' Graham	PG	United States	Atlanta Hawks (traded to Charlotte) (Note: June 21, 2018: Atlanta Hawks to Charlotte Hornets: Charlotte acquired Atlanta's second-round pick; Atlanta acquired Charlotte's 2019 and 2023 second-round selections)	Kansas (Sr.)
2	35	Melvin Frazier	SF	United States	Orlando Magic	Tulane (Jr.)
2	36	Mitchell Robinson	C	United States	New York Knicks (from Chicago via Oklahoma City) (Note: February 23, 2017: Chicago Bulls to Oklahoma City Thunder: Oklahoma City acquired Taj Gibson, Doug McDermott, and a 2018 second-round pick; Chicago acquired Joffrey Lauvergne, Anthony Morrow, and Cameron Payne; September 25, 2017: Oklahoma City Thunder to New York Knicks: New York acquired Enes Kanter, Doug McDermott, and Chicago's 2018 second-round pick; Oklahoma City acquired Carmelo Anthony)	Chalmette HS (Chalmette, Louisiana; HS Sr.) (Note: Mitchell Robinson tried to attend Western Kentucky University earlier the previous year, but left before attending a single practice there in order to train by himself until draft night. The last place he played for was at Chalmette High School as a proper high school senior.)
2	37	Gary Trent Jr.	SG	United States	Sacramento Kings (traded to Portland) (Note: June 21, 2018: Sacramento Kings to Portland Trail Blazers: Portland acquired Sacramento's second-round pick; Sacramento acquired two future second-round selections and cash considerations)	Duke (Fr.)
2	38	Khyri Thomas	SG	United States	Philadelphia 76ers (from Brooklyn, (Note: December 11, 2014: Brooklyn Nets to Philadelphia 76ers: Philadelphia acquired Andrei Kirilenko, Jorge Gutiérrez, the right to swap 2018 second-round picks between Cleveland and Brooklyn, a 2020 second-round pick, and cash considerations; Brooklyn acquired Brandon Davies and the Cleveland Cavaliers' 2018 second-round pick) traded to Detroit) (Note: June 21, 2018: Philadelphia 76ers to Detroit Pistons: Detroit acquired Philadelphia's second-round pick; Philadelphia acquired two future second-round selections)	Creighton (Jr.)
2	39	Isaac Bonga	SF	Germany	Philadelphia 76ers (from New York (Note: October 27, 2014: New York Knicks to Philadelphia 76ers: Philadelphia acquired Travis Outlaw, the right to swap 2018 second-round picks between New York and the L.A. Clippers, and a 2019 second-round pick; New York acquired Arnett Moultrie), traded to the L.A. Lakers) (Note: June 20, 2018: Philadelphia 76ers to Los Angeles Lakers: L.A. Lakers acquired New York's second-round pick; Philadelphia acquired Chicago's 2019 second-round pick from Los Angeles and cash considerations)	Frankfurt Skyliners (Germany)
2	40	Rodions Kurucs	SF	Latvia	Brooklyn Nets (from L.A. Lakers via Orlando and Toronto) (Note: August 10, 2012: Los Angeles Lakers to Orlando Magic (four-team trade with Philadelphia and Denver): Orlando acquired Arron Afflalo, Al Harrington, a 2013 second-round pick, and the worse of Denver's and New York's 2014 first-round picks from Denver; Nikola Vučević, Maurice Harkless, and a 2015 conditional first-round pick that was conveyed in 2017 for the Sacramento Kings from Philadelphia; Josh McRoberts, Christian Eyenga, a 2015 protected second-round pick, and the Lakers' 2017 protected first-round pick (converted to the Lakers' 2017 second-round pick and 2018 second-round pick) from the L.A. Lakers; L.A. Lakers acquired Dwight Howard, Earl Clark, and Chris Duhon from Orlando; Philadelphia acquired Jason Richardson from Orlando and Andrew Bynum from the L.A. Lakers; Denver acquired Andre Iguodala from Philadelphia; May 25, 2017: Orlando Magic to Toronto Raptors: Toronto acquired the worse 2018 second-round pick between Orlando and the L.A. Lakers; Orlando acquired the contractual release of Toronto general manager Jeff Weltman, whom the Magic immediately signed as their new president of basketball operations)	FC Barcelona Lassa (Spain)
2	41	Jarred Vanderbilt	SF	United States	Orlando Magic (from Charlotte via Memphis and Phoenix, (Note: February 16, 2016: Charlotte Hornets to Memphis Grizzlies (three-team trade with Miami): Memphis acquired P. J. Hairston, a 2018 second-round pick, and Brooklyn's 2019 second-round pick from Charlotte; Chris Andersen, a 2018 second-round pick, and a top-55 protected 2019 second-round pick from Miami; Charlotte acquired Courtney Lee and cash considerations from Memphis; Miami acquired Brian Roberts from Charlotte) (Note: September 22, 2017: Memphis Grizzlies to Phoenix Suns: Phoenix acquired Troy Daniels and a 2018 second-round pick for the middle choice between Charlotte, Memphis, and Miami; Memphis acquired a top-55 protected 2018 Phoenix second-round pick (which would not be conveyed); February 8, 2018: Phoenix Suns to Orlando Magic: Orlando acquired a 2018 second-round pick for the middle choice between Charlotte, Memphis, and Miami; Phoenix acquired Elfrid Payton) traded to Denver) (Note: June 21, 2018: Orlando Magic to Denver Nuggets: Denver acquired Orlando's second-round pick (No. 41 – Jarred Vanderbilt); Orlando acquired Denver's second-round pick (No. 43 – Justin Jackson) and a future second-round selection)	Kentucky (Fr.)
2	42	Bruce Brown	SG	United States	Detroit Pistons	Miami (So.)
2	43	Justin Jackson^{#}	SF	Canada	Denver Nuggets (from L.A. Clippers via Philadelphia and New York, (Note: February 20, 2014: Los Angeles Clippers to Philadelphia 76ers: Philadelphia acquired Byron Mullens and a 2018 second-round pick (which would later be swapped with the New York Knicks); L.A. Clippers acquired a protected 2014 second-round pick (which ultimately wasn't conveyed)) (Note: February 8, 2018: Denver Nuggets to Dallas Mavericks (three-team trade with New York): Dallas acquired Doug McDermott and the Portland Trail Blazers' 2018 second-round pick from Dallas; Denver acquired Devin Harris from Dallas and the L.A. Clippers' 2018 second-round pick from New York; New York acquired Emmanuel Mudiay from Denver) traded to Orlando)	Maryland (So.)
2	44	Issuf Sanon^{#}	PG	Ukraine	Washington Wizards	Olimpija Ljubljana (Slovenia)
2	45	Hamidou Diallo	SG	United States	Brooklyn Nets (from Milwaukee, (Note: February 5, 2018: Milwaukee Bucks to Brooklyn Nets: Brooklyn acquired Rashad Vaughn and a 2018 protected second-round pick; Milwaukee acquired Tyler Zeller) traded to Oklahoma City via Charlotte)	Kentucky (Fr.)
2	46	De'Anthony Melton	SG	United States	Houston Rockets (from Miami via Memphis) (Note: June 22, 2017: Memphis Grizzlies to Houston Rockets: Houston acquired the worst 2018 second-round pick between Charlotte, Memphis, and Miami; Memphis acquired the draft rights to Dillon Brooks)	USC (So.)
2	47	Sviatoslav Mykhailiuk	SG	Ukraine	Los Angeles Lakers (from Denver via Utah and Chicago) (Note: July 10, 2013: Utah Jazz to Denver Nuggets (three-team trade with Golden State): Utah acquired a 2018 second-round pick from Denver, Andris Biedriņš, Richard Jefferson, Brandon Rush, a 2014 first-round pick, a 2016 second-round pick, a 2017 first-round pick, a 2017 second-round pick, and cash considerations from Golden State; Denver acquired Randy Foye from Utah and a 2018 second-round pick from Golden State; Golden State acquired Andre Iguodala from Denver via sign-and-trade and Kevin Murphy from Utah) (Note: February 18, 2016: Utah Jazz to Chicago Bulls (three-team trade with Atlanta): Chicago acquired Justin Holiday from Atlanta and a 2018 second-round pick from Utah; Utah acquired Shelvin Mack from Atlanta; Atlanta acquired Kirk Hinrich from Chicago; July 7, 2016: Chicago Bulls to Los Angeles Lakers: L.A. Lakers acquired José Calderón, Denver's 2018 second-round pick, and Chicago's 2019 second-round pick; Chicago acquired the player rights to Ater Majok)	Kansas (Sr.)
2	48	Keita Bates-Diop	SF	United States	Minnesota Timberwolves	Ohio State (Jr.)
2	49	Chimezie Metu	PF	Nigeria (Note: Metu was born in the United States to Nigerian parents. He plays for the Nigeria national basketball team.)	San Antonio Spurs	USC (Jr.)
2	50	Alize Johnson	PF	United States	Indiana Pacers	Missouri State (Sr.)
2	51	Tony Carr^{#}	PG	United States	New Orleans Pelicans (from New Orleans via Miami, New Orleans and Chicago) (Note: February 18, 2016: New Orleans Pelicans to Miami Heat: Miami acquired a top-55 protected 2018 second-round pick; New Orleans acquired Jarnell Stokes and cash considerations; July 10, 2016: Miami Heat to New Orleans Pelicans: New Orleans reacquired their own 2018 second-round pick (protections removed); Miami acquired Luke Babbitt; September 1, 2017: New Orleans Pelicans to Chicago Bulls: Chicago acquired Quincy Pondexter, a 2018 second-round pick, and cash considerations; New Orleans acquired the player rights to Ater Majok)	Penn State (So.)
2	52	Vincent Edwards	SF	United States	Utah Jazz (traded to Houston) (Note: June 21, 2018: Utah Jazz to Houston Rockets: Houston acquired Utah's second-round pick; Utah acquired cash considerations)	Purdue (Sr.)
2	53	Devon Hall	SG	United States	Oklahoma City Thunder	Virginia (Sr.)
2	54	Shake Milton	SG	United States	Dallas Mavericks (from Portland via Denver, (Note: February 12, 2017: Portland Trail Blazers to Denver Nuggets: Denver acquired Mason Plumlee, the least favorable 2018 second-round pick between Portland and Sacramento, and cash considerations; Portland acquired Jusuf Nurkić and Memphis' 2017 first-round pick) traded to Philadelphia) (Note: June 21, 2018: Dallas Mavericks to Philadelphia 76ers: Philadelphia acquired Dallas' second-round selection (No. 54 – Shake Milton); Dallas acquired two of Philadelphia's second-round selections (No. 56 – Ray Spalding and No. 60 – Kostas Antetokounmpo))	SMU (Jr.)
2	55	Arnoldas Kulboka	SF	Lithuania	Charlotte Hornets (from Cleveland via Philadelphia and Brooklyn) (Note: September 27, 2014: Cleveland Cavaliers to Philadelphia 76ers: Philadelphia acquired Keith Bogans and a 2018 second-round pick; Cleveland acquired a conditional 2015 second-round pick (that ultimately wasn't conveyed)) (Note: June 25, 2015: Brooklyn Nets to Charlotte Hornets: Charlotte acquired the least valuable 2018 second-round pick between Brooklyn and Cleveland, a 2019 second-round pick, and cash considerations; Brooklyn acquired the draft rights to Juan Pablo Vaulet)	Orlandina Basket (Italy) (Note: While his official team was for the Brose Baskets in Germany, throughout the season, Kulboka was mainly loaned to the Orlandina Basket in Italy instead.)
2	56	Ray Spalding	PF	United States	Philadelphia 76ers (traded to Dallas)	Louisville (Jr.)
2	57	Kevin Hervey	PF	United States	Oklahoma City Thunder (from Boston) (Note: July 14, 2015: Boston Celtics to Oklahoma City Thunder: Oklahoma City acquired a top-55 protected 2018 second-round pick; Boston acquired Perry Jones, a 2019 second-round pick, and cash considerations)	Texas-Arlington (Sr.)
2	58	Thomas Welsh	C	United States	Denver Nuggets (from Golden State)	UCLA (Sr.)
2	59	George King	SG	United States	Phoenix Suns (from Toronto) (Note: February 23, 2017: Toronto Raptors to Phoenix Suns: Phoenix acquired Jared Sullinger, a 2017 second-round pick, and a 2018 second-round pick; Toronto acquired P. J. Tucker)	Colorado (Sr.)
2	60	Kostas Antetokounmpo	SF/PF	Greece (Note: Antetokounmpo was born in Greece to Nigerian parents. He holds dual citizenship and plays for the Greece national basketball team.)	Philadelphia 76ers (from Houston, (Note: June 28, 2017: Houston Rockets to Philadelphia 76ers: Philadelphia acquired a 2018 second-round pick and cash considerations; Houston acquired Shawn Long) traded to Dallas)	Dayton (Fr.)

== Notable undrafted players ==
These players were not selected in the 2018 NBA draft, but have played at least one game in the NBA.

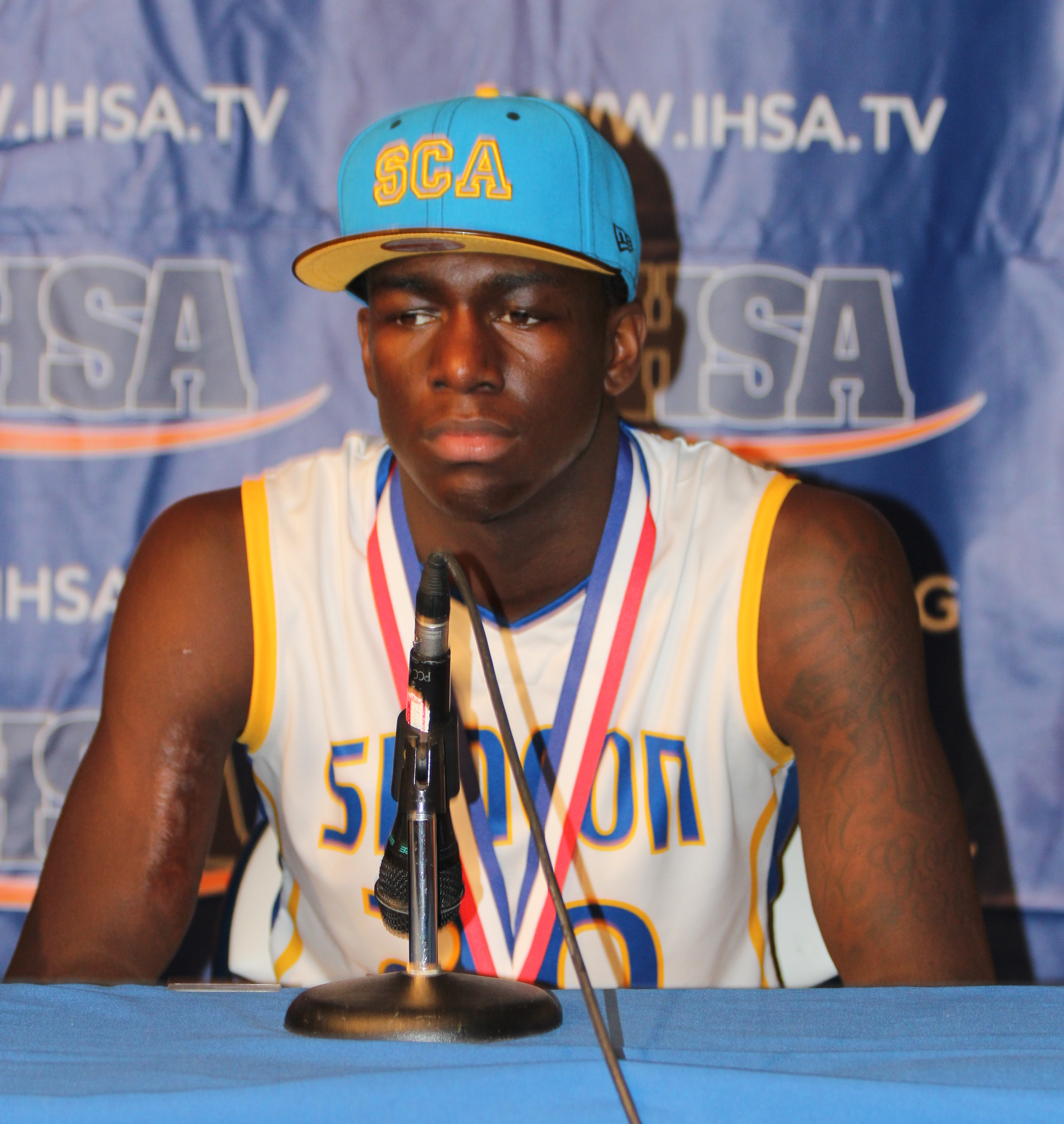
Kendrick Nunn had one of the most successful undrafted NBA rookie campaigns, being named to the All-Rookie First Team and becoming the runner-up for Rookie of the Year in the 2019–20 NBA season.

Player	Pos.	Nationality	School/club team
Jaylen Adams	PG	United States	St. Bonaventure (Sr.)
Deng Adel	SF	Australia (Note: Adel was born in Sudan and raised in Australia. He holds dual South Sudanese-Australian citizenship and has played for the Australia national basketball team.)	Louisville (Jr.)
Rawle Alkins	SG	United States	Arizona (So.)
Elijah Bryant	SG	United States	BYU (Sr.)
Joe Chealey	PG	United States	College of Charleston (Sr.)
Chris Chiozza	PG	United States	Florida (Sr.)
Gary Clark	PF	United States	Cincinnati (Sr.)
Bonzie Colson	PF	United States	Notre Dame (Sr.)
Xavier Cooks	PF	Australia	Winthrop (Sr.)
Marcus Derrickson	SF	United States	Georgetown (Jr.)
Tyler Davis	C	Puerto Rico (Note: Davis was born in the United States to a Puerto Rican mother. He plays for the Puerto Rico national basketball team.)	Texas A&M (Jr.)
Ángel Delgado	C	Dominican Republic	Seton Hall (Sr.)
Trevon Duval	PG	United States	Duke (Fr.)
Drew Eubanks	C	United States	Oregon State (Jr.)
Wenyen Gabriel	PF	South Sudan (Note: Gabriel was born in Sudan and raised in the United States. He holds dual South Sudanese-American citizenship and plays for the South Sudan national basketball team.)	Kentucky (So.)
Kaiser Gates	SF	United States	Xavier (Sr.)
Brandon Goodwin	PG	United States	Florida Gulf Coast (Sr.)
Donte Grantham	SG	United States	Clemson (Sr.)
Haywood Highsmith	SF	United States	Wheeling Jesuit (Sr.)
B. J. Johnson	SG	United States	La Salle (Sr.)
Jemerrio Jones	SF	United States	New Mexico State (Sr.)
Jock Landale	C	Australia	Saint Mary's (Sr.)
Zach Lofton	SG	United States	New Mexico State (Sr.)
Daryl Macon	PG	United States	Arkansas (Sr.)
J. P. Macura	SG	United States	Xavier ([Sr.)
Will Magnay	C/PF	Australia	Brisbane Bullets (Australia)
Kelan Martin	SF	United States	Butler (Sr.)
Yante Maten	PF	United States	Georgia (Sr.)
Dakota Mathias	SG	United States	Purdue (Sr.)
Jordan McLaughlin	PG	United States	USC (Sr.)
Chima Moneke	PF	Nigeria	UC Davis (Sr.)
Malik Newman	SG	United States	Kansas (So.)
Kendrick Nunn	PG	United States	Oakland (Sr.)
Theo Pinson	SF	United States	North Carolina (Sr.)
Duop Reath	C	Australia (Note: Reath was born in Sudan and raised in Australia. He holds dual South Sudanese-Australian citizenship and plays for the Australia national basketball team.)	LSU (Sr.)
Cameron Reynolds	SG	United States	Tulane (Sr.)
Duncan Robinson	SG	United States	Michigan (Sr.)
Brandon Sampson	SG	United States	LSU (Jr.)
Jae'Sean Tate	SG	United States	Ohio State (Sr.)
Jared Terrell	SG	United States	Rhode Island (Sr.)
Emanuel Terry	PF	United States	Lincoln Memorial (Sr.)
Allonzo Trier	SG	United States	Arizona (Jr.)
Gabe Vincent	SG/PG	Nigeria (Note: Vincent was born in the United States to a Nigerian father. He holds dual citizenship and plays for the Nigeria national basketball team.)	UC Santa Barbara (Sr.)
Yuta Watanabe	SF	Japan	George Washington (Sr.)
Johnathan Williams	PF	United States	Gonzaga (Sr.)
Kenrich Williams	SF	United States	TCU (Sr.)

== Combine ==
The invitation-only NBA Draft Combine was held in Chicago from May 16 to 20. The on-court element of the combine took place on May 18 and 19. A total of 69 players were invited to the NBA Draft this year, with two top talents in Deandre Ayton and Luka Dončić declining invitations for the event that year, with the latter player being involved with the 2018 EuroLeague Final Four at the time. Both mystery man Mitchell Robinson and Chandler Hutchison would remove themselves from the event at the last minute, although two other players would enter the event instead of them, leaving the proper number of official participants at 69. At the end of the draft deadline for international players, 12 players that entered the NBA Draft Combine that year ultimately withdrew from the NBA Draft, with 11 players returning to college and Brian Bowen planning on playing professionally before trying another NBA draft instead.

== Draft lottery ==
External videos
- 2018 NBA Draft Lottery Drawing, NBA's official YouTube channel. May 15, 2018.

The NBA draft lottery took place during the playoffs on May 15, 2018. This year will be the last time it uses what was originally the updated system for the NBA draft lottery to upgrade draft odds for teams in the lower regions of the NBA. Starting in 2019 onward, the newer updated draft lottery will give the bottom 3 teams equal odds for the No. 1 pick, while some of the teams higher up the NBA draft would get an increased chance for a top-four pick instead of a top-three pick like in this year, thus hoping to discourage teams from potentially losing games on purpose for higher draft picks (and potentially better talent in the process). There were also two tiebreakers involved for lottery odds this season; the first involved the Dallas Mavericks having one more result favoring them having the No. 1 pick over the Atlanta Hawks after splitting the odds together, while the second tiebreaker had the Chicago Bulls splitting odds with the Sacramento Kings, resulting in the Bulls having slightly better odds on their end in the process. Funnily enough, both of the teams mentioned that lost the tiebreakers would wind up being in the Top 3 at the end of the NBA draft lottery. Furthermore, the Hawks would trade their Top 3 selection to Dallas for their selection in the draft instead.

Denotes the actual lottery result

Team	2017–18 record	Lottery chances	Lottery probabilities													
Team	2017–18 record	Lottery chances	1st	2nd	3rd	4th	5th	6th	7th	8th	9th	10th	11th	12th	13th	14th
Phoenix Suns	21–61	250	.250	.215	.178	.358	—	—	—	—	—	—	—	—	—	—
Memphis Grizzlies	22–60	199	.199	.188	.171	.319	.124	—	—	—	—	—	—	—	—	—
Dallas Mavericks	24–58	138	.138	.142	.145	.238	.290	.045	—	—	—	—	—	—	—	—
Atlanta Hawks	24–58	137	.137	.142	.145	.085	.323	.155	.013	—	—	—	—	—	—	—
Orlando Magic	25–57	88	.088	.096	.106	—	.262	.359	.084	.004	—	—	—	—	—	—
Chicago Bulls	27–55	53	.053	.060	.070	—	—	.440	.331	.045	.001	—	—	—	—	—
Sacramento Kings	27–55	53	.053	.060	.070	—	—	—	.573	.226	.018	.000	—	—	—	—
Brooklyn Nets	28–54	28	.028	.033	.039	—	—	—	—	.725	.168	.008	.000	—	—	—
New York Knicks	29–53	17	.017	.020	.024	—	—	—	—	—	.813	.122	.004	.000	—	—
Los Angeles Lakers	35–47	11	.011	.013	.016	—	—	—	—	—	—	.870	.089	.002	.000	—
Charlotte Hornets	36–46	8	.008	.009	.012	—	—	—	—	—	—	—	.908	.063	.001	.000
Detroit Pistons	39–43	7	.007	.008	.010	—	—	—	—	—	—	—	—	.935	.039	.000
Los Angeles Clippers	42–40	6	.006	.007	.009	—	—	—	—	—	—	—	—	—	.960	.018
Denver Nuggets	46–36	5	.005	.006	.007	—	—	—	—	—	—	—	—	—	—	.982

1: The Brooklyn Nets pick was automatically conveyed to the Cleveland Cavaliers this year.
2: The Los Angeles Lakers' pick was conveyed to the Philadelphia 76ers since the pick turned unprotected for them this year and wasn't in the Nos. 2-5 range.
3: The Detroit Pistons' pick was conveyed to the Los Angeles Clippers since it was outside the top 4.

== Eligibility and entrants ==
The draft is conducted under the eligibility rules established in the league's 2017 collective bargaining agreement (CBA) with its players' union. The previous CBA that ended the 2011 lockout instituted no immediate changes to the draft but called for a committee of owners and players to discuss future changes.

- All drafted players must be at least 19 years old during the calendar year of the draft. In terms of dates, players who are eligible for the 2018 draft must be born on or before December 31, 1999.
- Since the 2016 draft, the following rules, as implemented by the NCAA Division I council for that division, are:
  - Declaration for the draft no longer results in automatic loss of college eligibility. As long as a player does not sign a contract with a professional team outside the NBA, or sign with an agent, he will retain college eligibility as long as he makes a timely withdrawal from the draft.
  - NCAA players have until 10 days after the end of the NBA Draft Combine to withdraw from the draft. Since the combine is held in mid-May, the current deadline is about five weeks after the previous mid-April deadline.
  - NCAA players may participate in the draft combine and are allowed to attend one tryout per year with each NBA team without losing college eligibility.
  - NCAA players may enter and withdraw from the draft up to two times without loss of eligibility. Previously, the NCAA treated the second declaration of draft eligibility as a permanent loss of college eligibility.

The NBA has since expanded the draft combine to include players with remaining college eligibility (who, like players without college eligibility, can only attend by invitation).

=== Early entrants ===
Players who are not automatically eligible have to declare their eligibility for the draft by notifying the NBA offices in writing no later than 60 days before the draft. For the 2018 draft, the date fell on April 22. After that date, "early entry" players can attend NBA pre-draft camps and individual team workouts to show off their skills and obtain feedback regarding their draft positions. Under the CBA a player may withdraw his name from consideration from the draft at any time before the final declaration date, which is 10 days before the draft. Under current NCAA rules, players had until May 30 (10 days after the draft combine) to withdraw from the draft and retain college eligibility.

A player who has hired an agent forfeits his remaining college eligibility regardless of whether he is drafted.

==== College underclassmen ====
A record-high 236 underclassed draft prospects (i.e., players with remaining college eligibility) had declared by the April 22 deadline, with 181 of these players being from college. The names listed here mean that they hired an agent, or had announced that they planned to do so before the night of the draft. At the end of the deadline, 77 players declared their intentions to enter the draft with an agent (with one player announcing his entry after the deadline) while 100 players announced their return to college for at least one more season. Meanwhile, Matur Maker, Brian Bowen, Micah Seaborn and Tavarius Shine did not enter the draft after letting their deadlines to retain college eligibility expire. These players instead decided to enter in 2019 via either the NBA G League or another professional league.

- (South Sudan) / (Australia) Deng Adel – F, Louisville (junior)
- (United States) Rawle Alkins – G, Arizona (sophomore)
- (United States) Mike Amius – F, Western Carolina (junior)
- (Greece) / (Nigeria) Kostas Antetokounmpo – F, Dayton (freshman)
- (The Bahamas) Deandre Ayton – C, Arizona (freshman)
- (United States) Marvin Bagley III – F/C, Duke (freshman)
- (United States) Mo Bamba – C, Texas (freshman)
- (United States) Keita Bates-Diop – F, Ohio State (junior)
- (United States) Tashawn Berry – G, Dakota College (sophomore)
- (United States) Leron Black – F, Illinois (junior)
- (United States) Jordan Brangers – G, South Plains College (sophomore)
- (United States) Mikal Bridges – F, Villanova (junior)
- (United States) Miles Bridges – F, Michigan State (sophomore)
- (United States) Bruce Brown Jr. – G, Miami (sophomore)
- (United States) Troy Brown Jr. – F, Oregon (freshman)
- (United States) Jalen Brunson – G, Villanova (junior)
- (United States) Elijah Bryant – G, BYU (junior)
- (United States) Tony Carr – G, Penn State (sophomore)
- (United States) Wendell Carter Jr. – F/C, Duke (freshman)
- (United States) Kameron Chatman – G/F, Detroit (junior)
- (United States) Bryant Crawford – G, Wake Forest (junior)
- (United States) Eric Davis – G, Texas (junior)
- (United States) / (Puerto Rico) Tyler Davis – C, Texas A&M (junior)
- (United States) Marcus Derrickson – F, Georgetown (junior)
- (United States) Hamidou Diallo – G, Kentucky (freshman)
- (United States) Donte DiVincenzo – G, Villanova (sophomore)
- (United States) Dikembe Dixson – F, UIC (sophomore)
- (United States) Trevon Duval – G, Duke (freshman)
- (United States) Drew Eubanks – F, Oregon State (junior)
- (United States) Jacob Evans – G/F, Cincinnati (junior)
- (United States) Tremaine Fraiser – G, Westchester CC (sophomore)
- (United States) Melvin Frazier Jr. – G/F, Tulane (junior)
- (South Sudan) / (United States) Wenyen Gabriel – F, Kentucky (sophomore)
- (United States) Kaiser Gates – F, Xavier (junior)
- (Canada) Shai Gilgeous-Alexander – G, Kentucky (freshman)
- (United States) D. J. Hogg – F, Texas A&M (junior)
- (United States) Aaron Holiday – G, UCLA (junior)
- (United States) Kevin Huerter – G, Maryland (sophomore)
- (United States) DeAngelo Isby – G/F, Utah State (junior)
- (United States) Jaren Jackson Jr. – F, Michigan State (freshman)
- (Canada) Justin Jackson – F/G, Maryland (sophomore)
- (Senegal) Ismaila Kane – F, Atlanta Metropolitan State College (freshman)
- (United States) Devonte Klines – G, Montana State (junior)
- (United States) Kevin Knox II – F, Kentucky (freshman)
- (United States) Terry Larrier – F, Connecticut (junior)
- (United States) Marquez Letcher-Ellis – F, Nevada (sophomore)
- (United States) Makinde London – F, Chattanooga (junior)
- (United States) Brandon McCoy – C, UNLV (freshman)
- (United States) De'Anthony Melton – G, USC (sophomore)
- (United States) Chimezie Metu – F, USC (junior)
- (United States) Shake Milton – G, SMU (junior)
- (United States) Max Montana – F, San Diego State (junior)
- (United States) Doral Moore – C, Wake Forest (junior)
- (United States) Malik Newman – G, Kansas (sophomore)
- (United States) / (Nigeria) Josh Okogie – G, Georgia Tech (sophomore)
- (Bosnia and Herzegovina) Ajdin Penava – F, Marshall (junior)
- (United States) Michael Porter Jr. – F, Missouri (freshman)
- (United States) Jerome Robinson – G, Boston College (junior)
- (United States) Mitchell Robinson – C, Western Kentucky (freshman)
- (United States) Brandon Sampson – G, LSU (junior)
- (United States) Corey Sanders – G, Rutgers (junior)
- (United States) Collin Sexton – G, Alabama (freshman)
- (United States) Landry Shamet – G, Wichita State (sophomore)
- (Spain) / (The Gambia) Yankuba Sima – F, Oklahoma State (junior)
- (United States) Anfernee Simons – G, IMG Academy (Postgraduate)
- (United States) Fred Sims – G, Chicago State (junior)
- (United States) Zhaire Smith – G/F, Texas Tech (freshman)
- (United States) Ray Spalding – F/C, Louisville (junior)
- (United States) Omari Spellman – F/C, Villanova (freshman)
- (United States) Khyri Thomas – G, Creighton (junior)
- (United States) Gary Trent Jr. – G, Duke (freshman)
- (United States) Allonzo Trier – G, Arizona (junior)
- (United States) Jarred Vanderbilt – F, Kentucky (freshman)
- (Germany) Moritz Wagner – F, Michigan (junior)
- (United States) Lonnie Walker IV – G, Miami (freshman)
- (United States) Robert Williams III – F/C, Texas A&M (sophomore)
- (United States) Trae Young – G, Oklahoma (freshman)

==== International players ====
International players that had declared this year and did not previously declare in another prior year can drop out of the draft about 10 days before the draft begins on June 11. Initially, there were 55 players who originally expressed interest in entering the 2018 draft, one of which was a player who came directly out of high school from Canada. However, by the end of the deadline, 43 of those players (including the aforementioned Canadian high schooler) would ultimately pull their names out of the draft, leaving only 11 true international players entering the NBA Draft this year (the NBA link mentions LiAngelo Ball as an international player in the loosest sense of the word, but not Billy Preston there). Combining both the number of players listed previously and both LiAngelo Ball and Billy Preston as automatically eligible underclassmen under unique situations, the total number of underclassmen rounds out to 90 overall players.

- Isaac Bonga – G, Frankfurt Skyliners (Germany)
- (Slovenia) Luka Dončić – G/F, Real Madrid (Spain)
- (Iceland) Tryggvi Hlinason – C, Valencia Basket (Spain)
- Michał Kolenda – F, Trefl Sopot (Poland)
- (Lithuania) Arnoldas Kulboka – F, Betaland Capo d'Orlando (Italy)
- (Latvia) Rodions Kurucs – F, FC Barcelona Lassa (Spain)
- (Bosnia and Herzegovina) Džanan Musa – F, Cedevita Zagreb (Croatia)
- (Cameroon) Williams Narace – SLUC Nancy Basket (France)
- Élie Okobo – G, Élan Béarnais Pau-Lacq-Orthez (France)
- (Ukraine) Issuf Sanon – G, Olimpija Ljubljana (Slovenia)
- Filip Zagrajski – G, Vrijednosnice Osijek (Croatia)

=== Automatically eligible entrants ===
Players who do not meet the criteria for "international" players are automatically eligible if they meet any of the following criteria:

- They have completed four years of their college eligibility.
- If they graduated from high school in the U.S., but did not enroll in a U.S. college or university, four years have passed since their high school class graduated.
- They have signed a contract with a professional basketball team not in the NBA, anywhere in the world, and have played under that contract.

Players who meet the criteria for "international" players are automatically eligible if they meet any of the following criteria:

- They are at least 22 years old during the calendar year of the draft. In terms of dates, players born on or before December 31, 1996, are automatically eligible for the 2018 draft.
- They have signed a contract with a professional basketball team not in the NBA within the United States, and have played under that contract.

Other automatically eligible players
Player	Team	Note	Ref.
(United States) LiAngelo Ball	Vytautas Prienai–Birštonas (Lithuania)	Removed himself from UCLA in 2017.	
(United States) Darin Johnson	Delaware 87ers (NBA G League)	Left Cal State Northridge in 2017; playing professionally since 2017–18 season.	
(Australia) Will Magnay	Brisbane Bullets (Australia)	Left Tulsa in 2017; playing professionally since 2017–18 season	
(United States) Billy Preston	Igokea Laktaši (Bosnia & Herzegovina)	Removed himself from Kansas in 2018.	
(United States) Maverick Rowan	Lakeland Magic (NBA G League)	Left NC State in 2017; playing professionally since 2017–18 season	

== Trades involving draft picks ==
=== Pre-draft trades ===
Before the day of the draft, the following trades were made and resulted in exchanges of draft picks between the teams below.

=== Draft-day trades ===
Draft-day trades occurred on June 21, 2018, the day of the draft.

== Invited attendees ==
The NBA annually invites around 15–20 players to sit in the so-called "green room", a special room set aside at the draft site for the invited players plus their families and agents. When their names are called, the player leaves the room and goes up on stage. Other players who are not invited are allowed to attend the ceremony. They sit in the stands with the fans and walk up on stage when (or if) they are drafted. On June 15, 2018, 19 total players were announced as invites for the NBA Draft that year (all of whom coming out of college this year), while potential top 3 pick Luka Dončić was initially not invited to the event due to the Liga ACB Finals potentially extending through the draft. On June 19, ESPN reported that Dončić would attend the draft, after all, following Real Madrid's championship victory the previous night, extending the list to 20 players. The following players (listed alphabetically) were confirmed as invites for the event this year:

- (The Bahamas) Deandre Ayton, Arizona
- (United States) Marvin Bagley III, Duke
- (United States) Mohamed Bamba, Texas
- (United States) Mikal Bridges, Villanova
- (United States) Miles Bridges, Michigan State
- (United States) Wendell Carter Jr., Duke
- (United States) Donte DiVincenzo, Villanova
- (Slovenia) Luka Dončić, Real Madrid (Spain)
- (Canada) Shai Gilgeous-Alexander, Kentucky
- (United States) Aaron Holiday, UCLA
- (United States) Chandler Hutchison, Boise State
- (United States) Jaren Jackson Jr., Michigan State
- (United States) Kevin Knox II, Kentucky
- (United States) Michael Porter Jr., Missouri
- (United States) Jerome Robinson, Boston College
- (United States) Collin Sexton, Alabama
- (United States) Zhaire Smith, Texas Tech
- (United States) Lonnie Walker IV, Miami
- (United States) Robert Williams, Texas A&M
- (United States) Trae Young, Oklahoma

== See also ==
- List of first overall NBA draft picks
