= Cindy Gnadinger =

American educator and academic administrator

15th President of Carroll University
- Incumbent
- Assumed office July 1, 2017
- Preceded by: Doug Hastad

President of St. Catharine College
- In office 2014–2016
- Preceded by: William D. Huston
- Succeeded by: Office abolished

Personal details
- Born: Cynthia Meyers Shepherdsville, Kentucky, U.S.
- Education: Western Kentucky University (BS); University of Louisville (M.Ed, EdD)

Cindy Gnadinger is an American educator and academic administrator, currently serving as the 15th President of Carroll University in Waukesha, Wisconsin.

== Early life and education ==
A native of Shepherdsville, Kentucky, Gnadinger earned a Bachelor of Science from Western Kentucky University and a Master of Education and Doctor of Education from the University of Louisville. Gnadinger was the recipient of a Fulbright Scholarship in 2013, allowing her to study in France.

== Career ==
Gnadinger began her career as a faculty member of the University of Louisville from 1994 to 2000. She then served at Bellarmine University from 2000 to 2013, working as an associate professor, director of graduate education programs, dean of the school of education, and assistant vice president for academic affairs. She then moved to William Peace University, where she was a professor of education and vice president for academic affairs. Gnadinger served as president of St. Catharine College until the school shut down in 2016. Gnadinger became the 15th President of Carroll University on July 1, 2017, succeeding Doug Hastad.

== Personal life ==
Gnadinger's husband, John, was appointed director of Carroll University's Analytics and Business Intelligence Consortium after leaving a career at Johnson Controls. They have three adult children.
