= Mike Budziszewski =

American football coach (born c. 1983)

Current position
- Title: Head coach
- Team: Carroll (WI)
- Conference: CCIW
- Record: 26–24

Biographical details
- Born: c. 1983 (age 42–43); Greenfield, Wisconsin, U.S.
- Education: University of Wisconsin–Oshkosh (2006); Winona State University

Playing career
- 2002–2005: Wisconsin–Oshkosh
- Position: Quarterback

Coaching career (HC unless noted)
- 2006: Wisconsin–Oshkosh (WR)
- 2007–2009: New Berlin Eisenhower HS (WI) (OC)
- 2010–2011: Winona State (GA)
- 2012: Winona State (RB)
- 2013–2014: Presentation (OC)
- 2015–2016: Presentation (AHC/OC)
- 2017–2019: Millikin (AHC/OC)
- 2020–present: Carroll (WI)

Head coaching record
- Overall: 26–24

Michael Budziszewski (born c. 1983) is an American college football coach. He is the head football coach for Carroll University, a position he has held since 2020. He also coached for Wisconsin–Oshkosh, New Berlin Eisenhower Middle/High School, Winona State, Presentation, and Millikin. He played college football for Wisconsin–Oshkosh as a quarterback.

== Head coaching record ==
Year	Team	Overall	Conference	Standing	Bowl/playoffs
Carroll Pioneers (College Conference of Illinois and Wisconsin) (2020–present)
2020–21	No team—COVID-19				
2021	Carroll	6–4	5–4	4th	
2022	Carroll	6–4	5–4	T–4th	
2023	Carroll	5–5	4–5	T–5th	
2024	Carroll	5–5	4–5	T–5th	
2025	Carroll	4–6	4–5	T–5th	
2026	Carroll	0–0	0–0		
Carroll:		26–24	22–23		
Total:		26–24			
