= Mark D. Nave =

American football coach

Biographical details
- Born: April 3, 1880; Indiana, U.S.
- Education: Wabash College

Coaching career (HC unless noted)
- 1901–1903: Carroll (WI)

Head coaching record
- Overall: 8–7–4

Marcellus Deming "Mark" Nave (born April 3, 1880) was an American college football coach. He was sixth head football at the Carroll College in Waukesha, Wisconsin and he held that position for three seasons, from 1901 until 1903. His coaching record at Carroll was.

== Discontinuation of 1903 ==
Carroll college did not field a team in 1903 due to an abundance of injuries during football practice. Five students were injured in a ten-day period. The incident was deemed so severe that the school chose to forbid the game. The decision was made after voting first by the football team and then of the students of the college. At first, both the players and students voted to keep playing against the wishes of the faculty. The student body eventually gave in to the faculty demands and the team was forced to disband.

The team reorganized and play picked back up for the next season in 1904 with former head coach John D. Schwender returning to the post.
