= Marcus Williams =

Marcus Williams is the name of:

- Marcus Williams (tight end) (born 1977), American football player for the Oakland Raiders
- Marcus Williams (basketball, born 1985), UConn guard and New Jersey, Golden State, and Memphis
- Marcus Williams (basketball, born 1986), Arizona forward/guard and San Antonio Spurs
- Marcus Williams (footballer) (born 1986), English footballer
- Marcus Williams (cornerback) (born 1991), American football
- Marcus Williams (safety) (born 1996), American football
- Marcus Williams (basketball, born 2002), college basketball player for the San Francisco Dons
- Marcus Williams (artist), New Zealand artist

== See also ==
- Mark Williams (disambiguation)
- Marc Williams (born 1988), Welsh footballer
- Marc Williams, DJ, musician, producer (The Three Amigos)
- List of people with surname Williams
