= Henny Hiemenz =

American football coach

Biographical details
- Born: c. 1978

Playing career
- 1996–1998: Ithaca
- Position: Fullback

Coaching career (HC unless noted)
- ?: Ithaca (assistant OL)
- ?: Illinois Wesleyan (RB)
- 2002: Utica (WR)
- 2003–2005: Carroll (WI) (OC)
- 2006–2010: Carroll (WI)
- 2011–2020: Concordia (WI) (OC)

Head coaching record
- Overall: 28–22

Henny Hiemenz (born c. 1978) is an American football coach. He served as was the head football coach at Carroll University in Waukesha, Wisconsin from 2006 to 2010, compiling a record of 28–22. Hiemenz was the offensive coordinator at Concordia University Wisconsin from 2011 to 2020.

== Head coaching record ==
Year	Team	Overall	Conference	Standing	Bowl/playoffs
Carroll Pioneers (Midwest Conference) (2006–2010)
2006	Carroll	4–6	4–5	T–6th	
2007	Carroll	5–5	5–4	T–4th	
2008	Carroll	7–3	6–3	4th	
2009	Carroll	5–5	5–4	T–4th	
2010	Carroll	7–3	6–3	T–2nd	
Carroll:		28–22	26–19		
Total:		28–22			
