= Mark W. Williams =

Biographical details
- Born: May 31, 1925; West Hartford, Connecticut, U.S.
- Died: October 25, 2013 (aged 88); Stone Mountain, Georgia, U.S.

Playing career
- 1945–1948: Hobart
- Position: End

Coaching career (HC unless noted)
- 1978–1981: Carroll (WI)

Head coaching record
- Overall: 12–24

Mark W. Williams (May 31, 1925 – October 25, 2013) was an American college football coach and infantryman who fought in Belgium and Holland during World War II. He was wounded twice and spent time in London hospitals. In the occupation forces, he played football in a number of Germany's stadia. After a successful business career, he reentered sports to be a football coach at the college level, and was later an associate professor of business administration at Carroll University.

Williams played college football at Hobart College in Geneva, New York. He also was able to complete two separate tryouts for the upstart "old" Baltimore Colts but did not make the professional team. He coached kids' football teams in Glen Ellyn, Illinois and eventually became a defensive line coach for the Joliet Chargers. Williams graduated from Hobart in 1949 and then went on to study sociology at New York University until 1951 and later completed a Masters of Business Administration from the University of Wisconsin–Milwaukee.

== College coaching career ==
After leaving a successful career in business Williams took a significant pay cut with a major change in personal lifestyle to become a collegiate head football coach, making nationwide headlines.

Williams became the 25th head football coach at Carroll College (now called Carroll University) in Waukesha, Wisconsin and he held that position for four seasons, from 1978 until 1981. His career coaching record at Carroll College was 12–24. This ranks him tenth at Carroll College in total wins and 20th at Carroll College in winning percentage.

== Death ==
Williams died at his home in Stone Mountain, Georgia, on October 25, 2013.

== Head coaching record ==
Year	Team	Overall	Conference	Standing	Bowl/playoffs
Carroll Pioneers (College Conference of Illinois and Wisconsin) (1978–1981)
1978	Carroll	6–3	5–3	T–3rd	
1979	Carroll	2–7	2–6	7th	
1980	Carroll	1–8	1–7	T–8th	
1981	Carroll	3–6	3–5	T–4th	
Carroll:		12–24	11–21		
Total:		12–24			
