= St. Catharine College =

College near Springfield, Kentucky

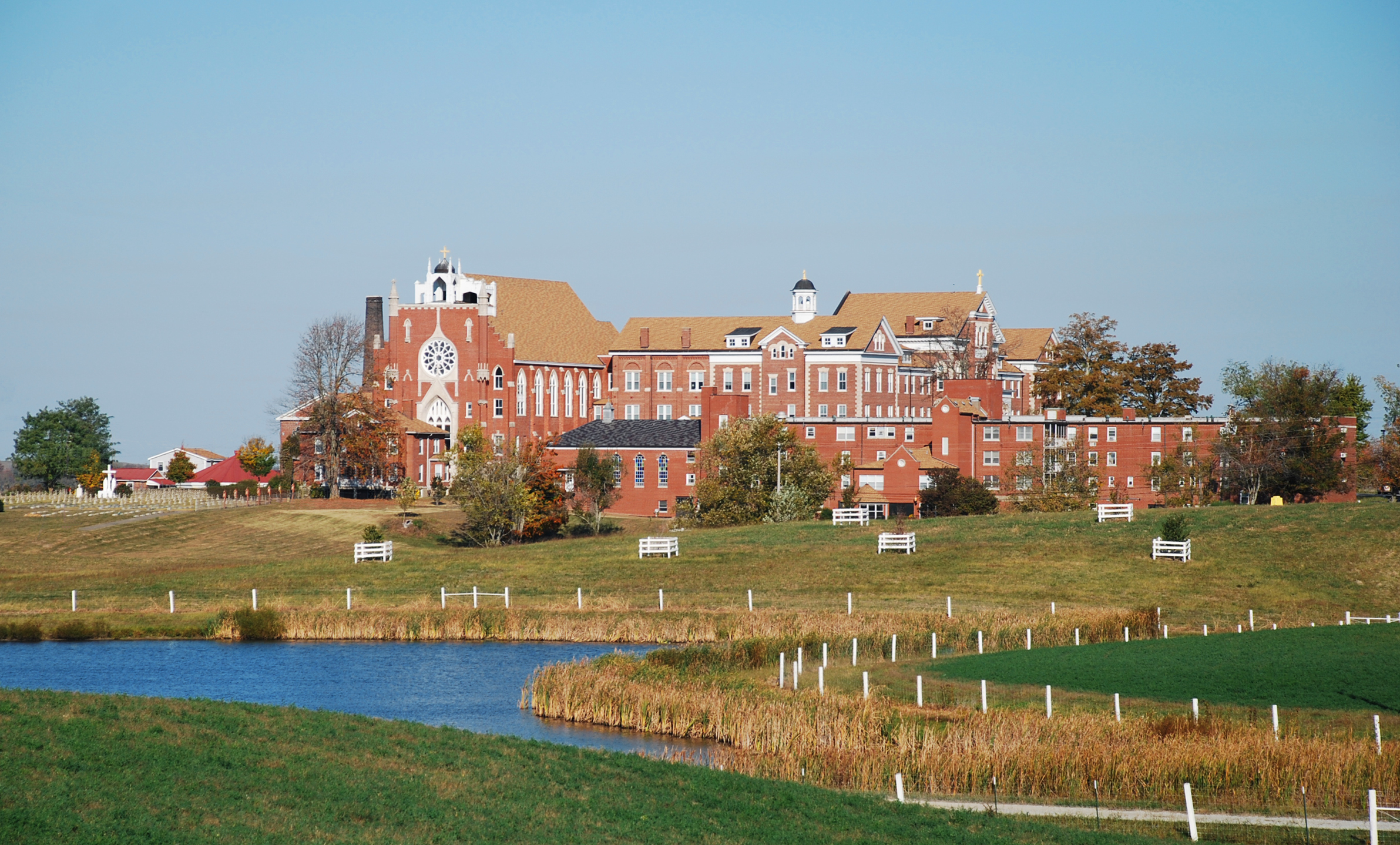
- St. Catharine Chapel
- Type: Private liberal arts college
- Active: 1931; 95 years ago–2016; 10 years ago
- Affiliations: ACCU; NAICU
- Religious affiliation: Roman Catholic (Dominican Sisters of Peace)
- President: Cindy Meyers Gnadinger
- Location: Springfield, Kentucky, U.S. 37.7092°N 85.2625°W
- Colors: Purple & Gold
- Nickname: Patriots
- Sporting affiliations: NAIA – Mid-South (until 2016)

St. Catharine College was a small Catholic liberal arts college near Springfield, Kentucky, United States. It was founded by the Dominican Sisters and was accredited by the Commission on Colleges of the Southern Association of Colleges and Schools. It had a peak enrollment of 750 students.

The college ceased operations at the end of July 2016 due to a budget shortfall and a lawsuit against the federal government.

== History ==
St. Catharine College traced its roots to classes held in a "still house" in the early 1800s. In 1839, the Kentucky Sisters of St. Dominic obtained a charter to grant educational degrees and a campus was built along Bardstown Road, today's U.S. Route 150.

A fire in 1904 destroyed the school's main building. The school rebuilt, adding a statue and plaque to mark the location of the original building.

In 1920, the state amended the school's charter to give it the authority to found colleges and grant collegiate degrees. In 1931, the school was re-dedicated as St. Catharine College, a women's academy and junior college.

The school became co-educational in 1951 and received accreditation through the Southern Association of Colleges and Schools in 1958.

In late 2003, St. Catharine Junior College received approval from the United States Department of Education to begin offering four-year programs. The Richard S. Hamilton Health and Sciences Building, containing classrooms and laboratories, was completed in 2006. Aquinas Hall, an apartment-style upperclassmen residence hall, was opened in 2011. The Emily W. Hundley Library was added in 2013.

=== Presidents ===
The college was originally governed by the Officers of the Congregation of Dominican Sisters, with the Mother Mary Louis Logsdon, O.P. serving as the college president from 1931 to 1941. In 1957, Sister Jean Marie Calahan, O.P., who was not an officer of the congregation, became the next college president. Martha Layne Collins, who had been the first woman to serve as Governor of Kentucky, was the college's sixth president.

President William D. Huston was the first male to serve as president of the college. He was followed by President Cindy Gnadinger who began serving as the college president in July 2015.

=== Financial problems and closure ===
The school was investigated by the federal government between 2011 and 2014 after it offered financial aid to students in its new four-year class offerings without receiving federal approval. Officials at the college claimed it was not required because the programs had not substantially changed the school's educational composition. The federal government agreed to reimburse some funding for the year 2014 but did not immediately make a decision about the prior three years.

In 2015, the Department of Education placed the college on heightened cash monitoring, requiring the school to distribute financial aid to students and then apply for reimbursement. An audit uncovered "severe" findings. As a result, the Board of Trustees replaced William D. Huston, who had served 18 years as the college's president, hired a compliance director, and replaced its senior leadership team and 90% of the staff in the business and financial aid offices. In February 2016, the college sued the federal government, seeking $645,000 in reimbursement and other financial compensation.

On June 1, 2016, St. Catharine announced that it would close at the end of July due to a $5 million deficit brought on by the construction of new residence halls, the health sciences building, and the new library. The college's dispute with the government over withheld student aid had resulted in enrollment declining from 600 students to 475 for the fall semester.

At the time of its closing, the college offered 17 Bachelor of Arts and Bachelor of Science degrees, one Master of Arts degree, and five Associate degree programs, along with one certificate program. It also featured the Berry Farming Program, based on the work of activist, farmer, and writer Wendell Berry. In the fall of 2018, that program was taken on by Sterling College in Vermont.

After the college's closure, the campus remained vacant until it was acquired by Addiction Recovery Care, a network of residential addiction treatment centers, which established the Crown Recovery Center in November 2020.

== Athletics ==
The St. Catharine's athletic teams were called the Patriots. The college was a member of the National Association of Intercollegiate Athletics (NAIA), primarily competing in the Mid-South Conference (MSC) from 2008–09 to 2015–16. The Patriots previously competed as an NAIA Independent during the 2007–08 school year (when the school joined the NAIA).

St. Catharine competed in 21 intercollegiate varsity sports: Men's sports included baseball, basketball, bowling, cross country, golf, soccer, swimming, tennis, track & field and wrestling; while women's sports included basketball, bowling, cross country, golf, soccer, fast-pitch softball, swimming, tennis, track & field and volleyball; and co-ed sports cheerleading.
