= Carroll University =

Private college in Waukesha, Wisconsin, US

- Former names: Carroll College (1846–2008)
- Motto: Christo et Litteris
- Motto in English: For Christ and Learning
- Type: Private university
- Established: January 31, 1846; 180 years ago
- Religious affiliation: Presbyterian Church (USA)
- Endowment: $103.3 million (2025)
- President: Cindy Gnadinger
- Provost: Mark Blegen
- Academic staff: 136 full-time, 269 part-time
- Administrative staff: 96
- Students: 3,283 (fall 2022)
- Undergraduates: 2,771 (fall 2022)
- Postgraduates: 512 (fall 2022)
- Location: Waukesha, Wisconsin, United States; 43°0′13″N 88°13′40″W
- Campus: 137 acres (55 ha)
- Colors: Orange, white, and blue
- Nickname: Pioneers
- Sporting affiliations: NCAA Division III – CCIW
- Mascot: Pio Pete
- Website: carrollu.edu
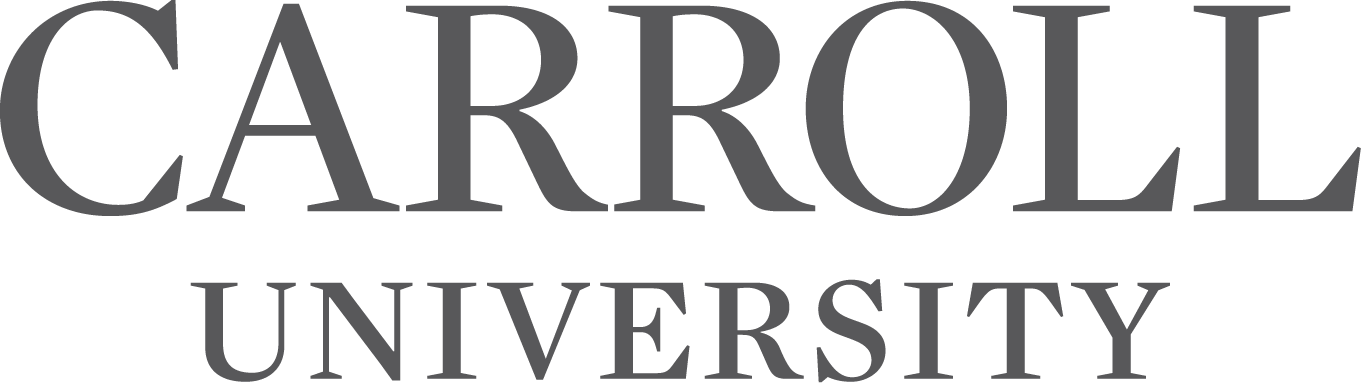

Carroll University is a private university in Waukesha, Wisconsin, United States. It was established in 1846 as Wisconsin's first four-year institution of higher learning. The university is affiliated with the Presbyterian Church (USA).

== History ==
Prior to its establishment, what is now Carroll University was Prairieville Academy which was founded in 1841. Its charter—named for Charles Carroll of Carrollton, a signer of the United States Declaration of Independence—was passed into law by the Wisconsin Territorial Legislature on January 31, 1846. During the 1860s, the American Civil War and financial difficulty caused Carroll to temporarily suspend operations.

The board of trustees voted unanimously to change the institution's name from Carroll College to Carroll University effective July 1, 2008.

=== Presidents ===
- John Adams Savage: 1850–1863
- Rensellaer B. Hammond: 1863–1864
- Walter L. Rankin: 1866–1871*, 1893–1903
- Wilbur Oscar Carrier: 1903–1917
- Herbert Pierpoint Houghton: 1918–1920
- William Arthur Ganfield: 1921–1939
- Gerrit T. Vander Lugt: 1940–1946
- Nelson Vance Russell: 1946–1951
- Robert D. Steele: 1952–1967
- John T. Middaugh: 1967–1970
- Robert V. Cramer: 1971–1988
- Dan C. West: 1988–1992
- Frank S. Falcone: 1993–2006
- Douglas N. Hastad: 2006–2017
- Cindy Gnadinger: 2017-

* Between July 31, 1871, and June 22, 1893, no college work was carried on. While the charter retained the college privileges, teaching was on the academy level. College work was resumed and the office of the presidency was filled again in 1893.

== Campus ==
The campus is home to a variety of nineteenth and early 20th century historical buildings, including Sneeden House (a 1922 colonial home now used as a guesthouse and conference center) and MacAllister Hall (a renovated, 19th-century mansion that now houses offices for the CFO, English, modern language, computational and physical sciences, chemistry, and the Division of Arts and Sciences).

== Academics ==
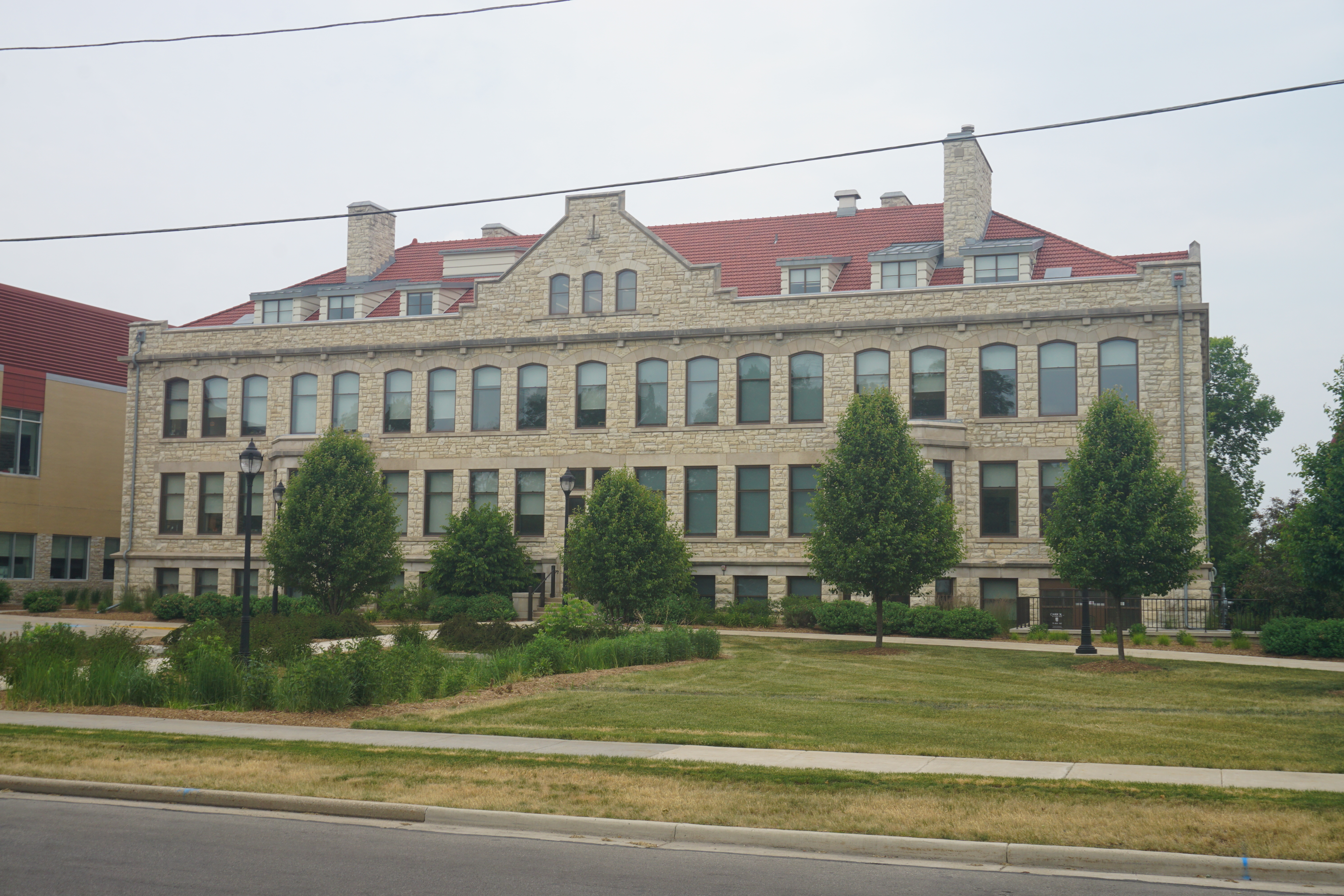
Rankin Hall

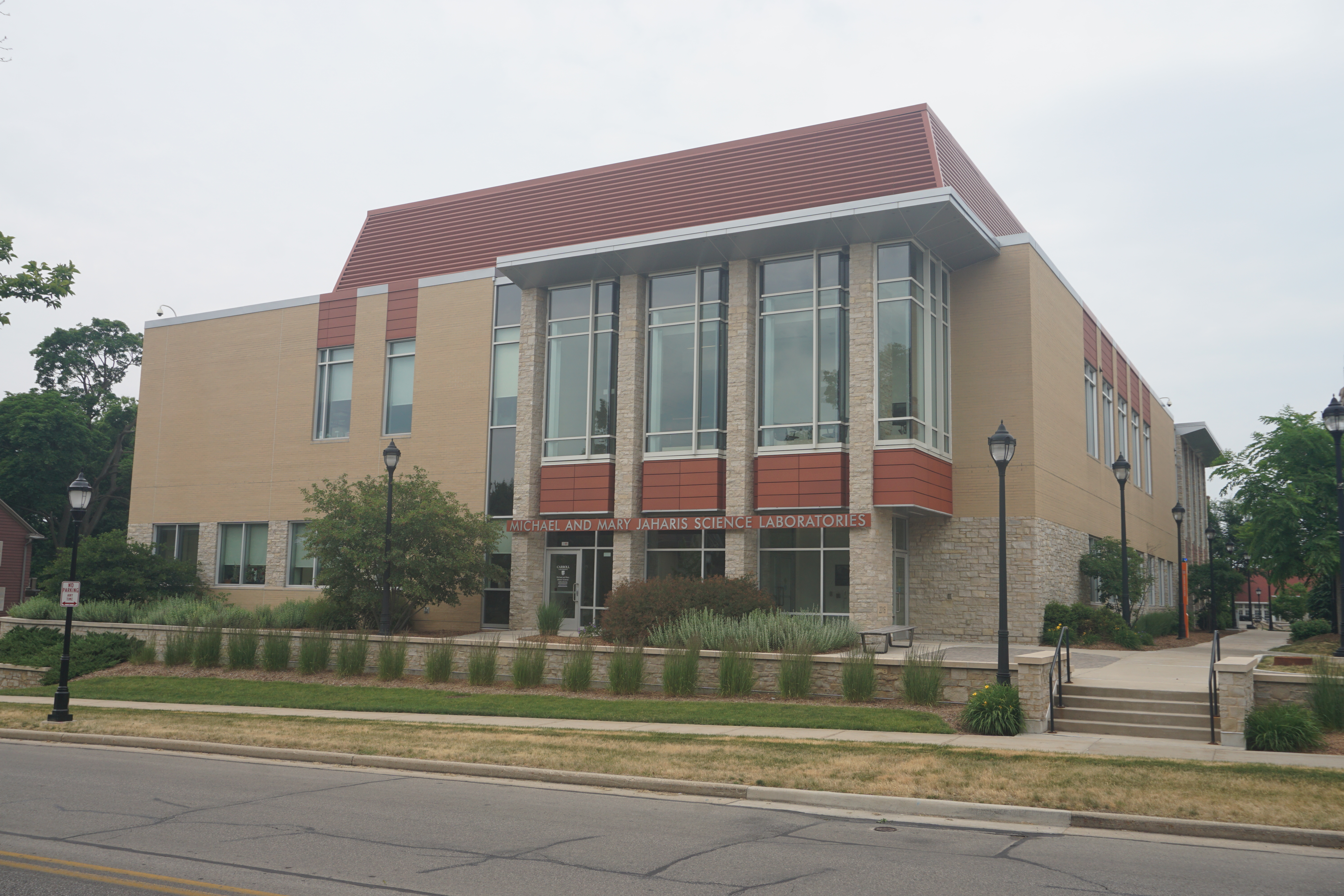
Michael and Mary Jaharis Science Laboratories

Carroll University offers more than 95 areas of study at the undergraduate level, with master's degrees and certificates in selected subjects, as well as one clinical doctorate program in physical therapy. Its most popular undergraduate majors, based on number, out of 580 graduates in 2022, were:

- Exercise Science and Kinesiology (105)
- Registered Nursing/Registered Nurse (100)
- Psychology (37)
- Biology/Biological Sciences (36)
- Business Administration and Management (33)
- Elementary Education and Teaching (31)

Carroll University ranked 31st in Regional Universities Midwest in U.S. News & World Report 2022 America's Best Colleges. In 2018, Forbes ranked Carroll 594th among 650 colleges in the United States. In 2018, Money Magazine ranked Carroll 613th among 727 colleges in the United States.

== Traditions ==
Since the 1960s, bagpipes have been a part of Carroll's opening convocation and commencement ceremony. Freshmen are escorted to their first assembly by a lone bagpiper, and upon graduation are led to commencement by a band of bagpipers.

== Athletics ==
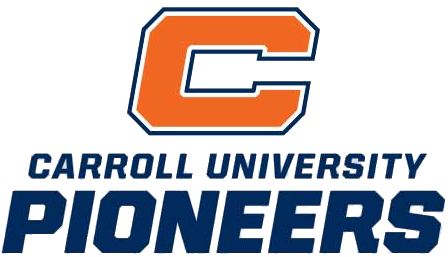
Carroll Pioneers wordmark

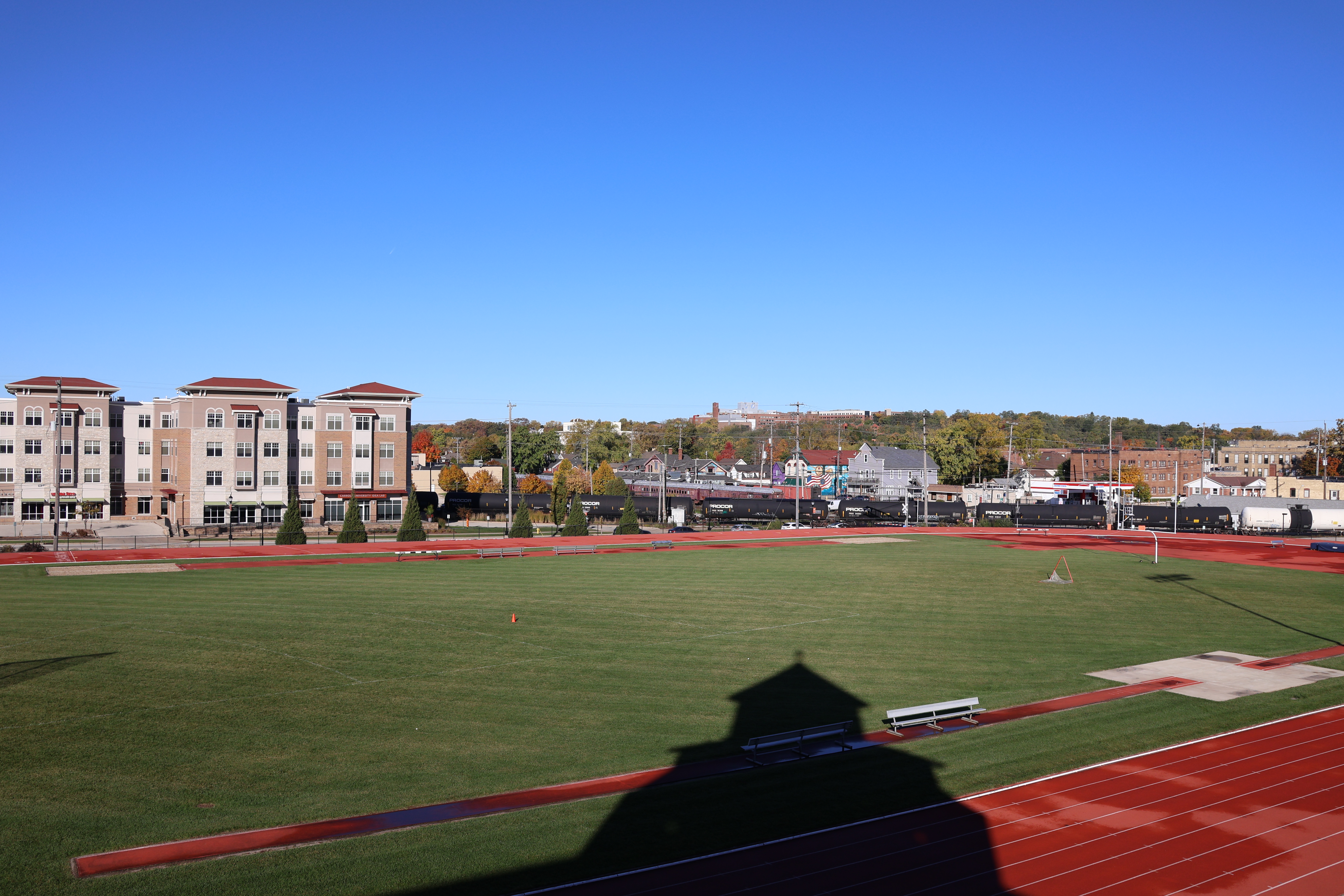
Schneider Stadium, home to Carroll football, soccer, and lacrosse teams

Carroll athletic teams are the Pioneers. The university is a member of the Division III level of the National Collegiate Athletic Association (NCAA), primarily competing in the College Conference of Illinois and Wisconsin (CCIW) since the 2016–17 academic year; which they were a member on a previous stint from 1955–56 to 1992–93.

Carroll competes in 23 intercollegiate varsity sports. Men's sports include baseball, basketball, cross country, football, golf, lacrosse, soccer, swimming, tennis and track & field (indoor and outdoor); while women's sports include basketball, bowling, cross country, golf, lacrosse, soccer, softball, swimming, tennis, track & field (indoor and outdoor) and volleyball.

=== Football ===
The college football program at Carroll began in the late 1890s. Past head coaches include Glenn Thistlethwaite, Vince DiFrancesca, and Matty Bell. The current coach is Mike Budziszewski, who replaced Mark Krzykowski after the 2019 season.

== Student newspaper ==
The New Perspective (TNP) is a student newspaper at Carroll University. The paper is published every other Tuesday during the academic year, except during holidays, semester breaks, and exam periods. Its circulation is 1,500. The New Perspective is free and distributed throughout the campus and city. The paper was founded in 1874 as the Carroll Echo. In 1968, the name of the paper was changed to The Perspective. In 1976, Gary Stevens, the faculty advisor for the newspaper, suggested the editor-in-chief position be replaced with an editorial staff. The Student Senate approved the idea. With this change came another name change, to The New Perspective.

== Notable alumni ==
- Steven Burd, former chairman and president of Safeway
- Howard Fuller, civil rights activist
- Donald Goerke, inventor of Spaghetti-Os

== Notable faculty ==
- Cardon V. Burnham, composer
- Edward Daniels, abolitionist & U.S. Civil War cavalry officer
- Jeffrey Douma, current Yale University music professor and choir director
- Edward Payson Evans, historian & linguist
- Tamara Grigsby, Wisconsin State Representative
- Ray Wendland, petrochemist
- Viola S. Wendt, poet
