= Mindfulness =

Secular meditation practice

In clinical psychology and well-being, mindfulness is the cognitive skill of, or state reached by intentionally maintaining moment-by-moment awareness of bodily sensations, feelings, thoughts, and immediate surroundings with a non-judgmental or equanimous attitude, counteracting [the mind's] automatic rumination and cognitive elaborations on one's experiences. The term mindfulness derives from the Pali word sati, a significant element of Buddhist traditions, and it incorporates elements from Theravada, Chan, and Tibetan Buddhist meditation techniques. (Note: While translated as "mindfulness," and often interpreted as "bare attention," the term sati has broader connotations: "memory,"(PTS) "retention,"(Dreyfus 2013, pp. 44–48) "mindfulness, alertness, self-possession."(PTS) In a Buddhist context it has a wider meaning and purpose, related to vipassana, namely Sampajañña discerning what is beneficial and what is not, and calming the mind by this discernment (Polak 2011, pp. 153–56, Williams & Tribe 2000, p. 46, Buddhadasa Bhikkhu 2014, pp. 79, 101, 117 note 42 Though definitions and techniques of mindfulness are wide-ranging (Thompson 2020, p. 120), Buddhist traditions describe what constitutes mindfulness, such as how perceptions of the past, present and future arise and cease as momentary sense-impressions and mental phenomena (Karunamuni & Weerasekera 2019, Analayo 2003, Bhikkhu Bodhi).)

Mindfulness is a secularized form of meditation, the product of a mutual syncretism between eastern spiritual traditions influenced by western esotericism and religion, and western traditions and psychology influenced by these syncretized eastern traditions. In 1975 it was introduced in western medicine by Herbert Benson, and integrated in the 1970s and 1980s into health-programs and psychotherapy by Jon Kabat-Zinn, Zindel Segal, and Mark Williams. They and others in clinical psychology and psychiatry have developed a number of therapeutic applications based on mindfulness interventions for helping people experiencing a variety of psychological conditions. (Note: Mindfulness practice has been employed to reduce depression (Blanck et al. 2018, Jain et al. 2015, Galante et al. 2021), stress (Khoury et al. 2015, Hofmann et al. 2010, Galante et al. 2021), anxiety (Blanck et al. 2018, Khoury et al. 2015, Hofmann et al. 2010, Galante et al. 2021) and in the treatment of drug addiction (Chiesa & Serretti 2014, Garland, Froeliger & Howard 2014, Sancho et al. 2018). Programs based on mindfulness models have been adopted within schools, prisons, hospitals, veterans' centers, and other environments (Zhang et al. 2021, Gong et al. 2023) and mindfulness programs have been applied for additional outcomes such as for healthy aging, weight management, athletic performance (Noetel et al. 2019), helping children with special needs, and as an intervention during early pregnancy.) Since the 1990s, secular mindfulness meditation has gained a broad popular acceptance in the West.

Clinical studies have documented mental health benefits of mindfulness as well as physical health benefits in different patient categories and in healthy adults and children. Mindfulness research has also long attracted criticism, particularly in its early decades, due to concerns about limited methodological rigor. More recent research, however, has become substantially more rigorous, employing randomized controlled trials, active control groups, and stronger methodological standards.

Some critics have also argued that mindfulness is over-commercialized and over-marketed, and that "McMindfulness" strips it of its Buddhist ethical and wisdom roots in favor of a productivity-focused self-help product. (Note: "What was once a tool for spiritual exploration has been turned into a panacea for the modern age — a cure-all for common human problems, from stress, to anxiety, to depression. [...] Yet the potential for emotional and psychological disturbance is rarely talked about by mindfulness researchers, the media, or mentioned in training courses. [...] Mindfulness has been separated from its roots, stripped of its ethical and spiritual connotations, and sold to us as a therapeutic tool. [...] Instead, as Giles Coren [sic; the author links to Ron Purser and David Loy] recently claimed, this technique has been turned into a McMindfulness which only reinforces one's egocentric drives.")

== Etymology ==
The Buddhist term translated into English as "mindfulness" originates in the Pali term sati and in its Sanskrit counterpart smṛti. It is often translated as "bare attention", but in the Buddhist tradition it has a broader meaning and application, and the meaning of these terms has become the topic of extensive debate and discussion.

The English term mindfulness already existed before it came to be used in a (western) Buddhist context. It was first recorded as myndfulness in 1530 (John Palsgrave translates French pensée), as mindfulnesse in 1561, and mindfulness in 1817. Morphologically earlier terms include mindful (first recorded in 1340), mindfully (1382), and the obsolete mindiness (c. 1200). According to the Merriam-Webster Dictionary, mindfulness may also refer to "a state of being aware". Synonyms for this "state of being aware" are wakefulness, attention, alertness, prudence, conscientiousness, awareness, consciousness, and observation.

The Pali-language scholar Thomas William Rhys Davids (1843–1922) first translated sati in 1881 as English mindfulness in sammā-sati "Right Mindfulness; the active, watchful mind". Noting that Daniel John Gogerly (1845) initially rendered sammā-sati as "correct meditation", Davids writes:

sati is literally 'memory' but is used with reference to the constantly repeated phrase 'mindful and thoughtful' (sato sampajâno); and means that activity of mind and constant presence of mind which is one of the duties most frequently inculcated on the good Buddhist."

According to Bryan Levman, "the word sati incorporates the meaning of 'memory' and 'remembrance' in much of its usage in both the suttas and the [traditional Buddhist] commentary, and [...] without the memory component, the notion of mindfulness cannot be properly understood or applied, as mindfulness requires memory for its effectiveness".According to Nina van Gorkom, drawing on the Pali texts and commentaries, when mindfulness (''sati'') arises there is heedfulness of the wholesome so that the opportunity for wholesome action is not wasted; there must be mindfulness with generosity, morality, calm and the development of insight.

According to Robert Sharf, smṛti originally meant 'to remember', 'to recollect', 'to bear in mind', as in the Vedic tradition of remembering the sacred texts. The term sati also means 'to remember'. Bhikku Analayo notes that the Sanskrit root of smṛti conveyed attention in pre-Buddhist usage, citing Rigveda 10.106.9, where a related form means "give heed".

John D. Dunne says that the translation of sati and smṛti as 'mindfulness' is confusing. A number of Buddhist scholars have started trying to establish 'retention' as the preferred alternative. Bhikkhu Bodhi also describes the meaning of sati as 'memory'. (Note: "The word derives from a verb, sarati, meaning "to remember," and occasionally in Pali sati is still explained in a way that connects it with the idea of memory. But when it is used in relation to meditation practice, we have no word in English that precisely captures what it refers to. An early translator cleverly drew upon the word mindfulness, which is not even in my dictionary. This has served its role admirably, but it does not preserve the connection with memory, sometimes needed to make sense of a passage.) (Note: The terms sati/smṛti have been translated as: Attention (Jack Kornfield); Awareness; Concentrated attention (Mahasi Sayadaw); Inspection (Herbert V. Günther); Mindful attention; Mindfulness; Recollecting mindfulness (Alexander Berzin); Recollection (Erik Pema Kunsang, Buddhadasa); Reflective awareness (Buddhadasa); Remindfulness (James H. Austin); Retention; Self-recollection (Jack Kornfield))

== Meaning and definitions ==
There is a multiplicity of definitions, which has limited the comparibility of research outcomes. Mindfulness can be defined as a practice (e.g. a set of skills and techniques), a mental state, or as a trait. While often defined as "present-centered awareness" or "bare attention", these qualifications have been questioned and criticized, as mindfulness in Buddhism also involves discernment and ethical judgment. To give an adequate introduction to these aspects, first the Buddhist background is treated, and then the psychological scientific approaches.

=== Buddhism ===
Secular mindfulness is derived from Buddhist meditation techniques; the word 'mindfulness' translates the terms sati and smriti. These have multiple meanings, centering on memory and the remembrance of the dharma; present-centered awareness, and ethical correct behavior and self-restrainment.

==== Remembrance of the dharmas ====
The Pali word sati, which is commonly translated as 'mindfulness', carries the connotation of memory. Early Buddhist texts describe the concept not only as awareness of sense perceptions but also as recollection of the Buddha's teachings and past events:

Sati is required not only to fully take in the moment to be remembered, but also to bring this moment back to mind at a later time. [...] This twofold character of sati can also be found in some verses in the Sutta Nipāta, which instruct the listener to set out with sati, subsequent to an instruction given by the Buddha. In these instances sati seems to combine both present moment awareness and remembering what the Buddha had taught.

In the Satipaṭṭhāna-sutta the term sati means to remember the dharmas, whereby the true nature of phenomena can be seen. Sharf refers to the Milindapañha, which said that the arising of sati calls to mind the wholesome dhammas such as the four foundations of mindfulness, the five faculties, the five powers, the seven awakening-factors, the Noble Eightfold Path, and the attainment of insight. According to Rupert Gethin,

[sati] should be understood as what allows awareness of the full range and extent of dhammas; sati is an awareness of things in relation to things, and hence an awareness of their relative value. Applied to the satipaṭṭhānas, presumably what this means is that sati is what causes the practitioner of yoga to "remember" that any feeling he may experience exists in relation to a whole variety or world of feelings that may be skillful or unskillful, with faults or faultless, relatively inferior or refined, dark or pure." (Note: Quotes from Gethin, Rupert M.L. (1992), The Buddhist Path to Awakening: A Study of the Bodhi-Pakkhiȳa Dhammā. Brill's Indological Library, 7. Leiden and New York: Brill)

==== Bare attention and ethical correct behavior ====
Sharf notes that the original meaning of sati has little to do with "bare attention", the popular contemporary interpretation of sati, "since it entails, among other things, the proper discrimination of the moral valence of phenomena as they arise."

Georges Dreyfus has also expressed unease with the description of mindfulness as "bare attention" or "nonelaborative, nonjudgmental, present-centered awareness", stressing that mindfulness in a Buddhist context also means "remembering", which indicates that the function of mindfulness also includes the retention of information. (Note: Dreyfus concludes his examination by stating: "The identification of mindfulness with bare attention ignores or, at least, underestimates the cognitive implications of mindfulness, its ability to bring together various aspects of experience so as to lead to the clear comprehension of the nature of mental and bodily states. By over-emphasizing the nonjudgmental nature of mindfulness and arguing that our problems stem from conceptuality, contemporary authors are in danger of leading to a one-sided understanding of mindfulness as a form of therapeutically helpful spacious quietness. I think that it is important not to lose sight that mindfulness is not just a therapeutic technique but is a natural capacity that plays a central role in the cognitive process. It is this aspect that seems to be ignored when mindfulness is reduced to a form of nonjudgmental present-centered form of awareness of one's experiences.) Robert H. Sharf notes that Buddhist practice is aimed at the attainment of "correct view", not just "bare attention". (Note: Sharf: "Mahasi's technique did not require familiarity with Buddhist doctrine (notably abhidhamma), did not require adherence to strict ethical norms (notably monasticism), and promised astonishingly quick results. This was made possible through interpreting sati as a state of "bare awareness"—the unmediated, non-judgmental perception of things "as they are", uninflected by prior psychological, social, or cultural conditioning. This notion of mindfulness is at variance with premodern Buddhist epistemologies in several respects. Traditional Buddhist practices are oriented more toward acquiring "correct view" and proper ethical discernment, rather than "no view" and a non-judgmental attitude.")

Jay L. Garfield, quoting Shantideva and other sources, stresses that mindfulness is constituted by the union of two functions, calling to mind and vigilantly retaining in mind. He demonstrates that there is a direct connection between the practice of mindfulness and the cultivation of morality—at least in the context of Buddhism, from which modern interpretations of mindfulness are stemming.

==== Contemporary Buddhist definitions ====
According to American Buddhist monk Ven Bhante Vimalaramsi's book A Guide to Tranquil Wisdom Insight Meditation, the term "mindfulness" is often interpreted differently than what was originally formulated by the Buddha. In the context of Buddhism, he offers the following definition:

Mindfulness means to remember to observe how mind's attention moves from one thing to another. The first part of Mindfulness is to remember to watch the mind and remember to return to your object of meditation when you have wandered off. The second part of Mindfulness is to observe how mind's attention moves from one thing to another.

In Thich Nhat Hanh's lineage, mindfulness is closely intertwined with the concept of interbeing, the notion that all things are interconnected. This school of thought emphasizes awareness of the present moment and ethical living, reflecting the interconnected nature of existence. Thích Nhất Hạnh defined mindfulness as "the energy that sheds light on all things and all activities, producing the power of concentration, bringing forth deep insight and awakening."

Shinzen Young says a person is mindful when they have mindful awareness, and defines that to be when "concentration power, sensory clarity, and equanimity [are] working together." John Yates (Culadasa) defines mindfulness to be "the optimal interaction between attention and peripheral awareness", where he distinguishes attention and peripheral awareness as two distinct modes in which one may be conscious of things.

=== Psychology ===
==== Methodological concerns ====
Various scholars have criticized how mindfulness has been defined or represented in recent Western psychology publications. In psychology, mindfulness has a more limited meaning than in Buddhism. These modern understandings depart significantly from the accounts of mindfulness in early Buddhist texts and authoritative commentaries in the Theravada and Indian Mahayana traditions.

Purser & Milillo note that scholars and psychologists have tended to a narrow interpretation of mindfulness, restricted to "the cognitive capacities of attention and awareness", selectively focusing on "the role of attention as the key component of mindfulness". Adam Valerio has argued that conflict between academic disciplines over how mindfulness is defined, understood, and popularly presented may be indicative of a personal, institutional, or paradigmatic battle for ownership over mindfulness, one where academics, researchers, and other writers are invested as individuals in much the same way as religious communities.

===== Skill (practice), state, trait =====
Mindfulness is a multivalent term, as it can be defined as a trait, a mental state, and as a practice or skill:

1. A trait, a dispositional characteristic (a relatively long-lasting trait), a person's tendency to more frequently enter into and more easily abide in mindful states;
2. A state, an outcome (a state of awareness resulting from mindfulness training), being in a state of present-moment awareness;
3. A skill or practice (mindfulness meditation (Note: "Mindfulness meditation" may refer to either the secular, western practice of mindfulness, or to modern Buddhist Vipassana-meditation.) practice itself), to reach a mindful state.

Several questionnaires approach mindfulness as a state, (Note: State-like questionnaires: The Toronto Mindfulness Scale (TMS) measures mindfulness as a state-like phenomenon, that is evoked and maintained by regular practice.; The State Mindfulness Scale (SMS) is a 21-item survey with an overall state mindfulness scale, and 2 sub-scales (state mindfulness of mind, and state mindfulness of body).) while other mindfulness measures have been developed which are based on self-reporting of trait-like constructs. (Note: Trait-like measures: Mindful Attention Awareness Scale (MAAS); Freiburg Mindfulness Inventory (FMI); Kentucky Inventory of Mindfulness Skills (KIMS); Cognitive and Affective Mindfulness Scale (CAMS); Mindfulness Questionnaire (MQ); Revised Cognitive and Affective Mindfulness Scale (CAMS-R); Philadelphia Mindfulness Scale (PHLMS))

==== Definitions ====
Based on an agregate of sources, mindfulness could be defined as:
* the cognitive skill of, or state reached by
* intentionally, on purpose
* sustaining metacognitive awareness (paying attention)
* in the present moment (Note: Baer cites Kabat-Zinn, J. (1994): Wherever you go, there you are: Mindfulness meditation in everyday life. New York: Hyperion, p.4.) towards
- sensory sensations (seeing, hearing, smelling, tasting, and bodily sensations) and
- mental events or contents (thoughts, emotions, perceptions, and intentions)
* with a non-judgmental or equanimous attitude,
* counteracting [the mind's] automatic rumination and cognitive elaborations "on what manifests itself in experience".

Jon Kabat-Zinn, the pioneering figure in the introduction of mindfulness-based approaches into healthcare and psychological science, described mindfulness as "the awareness that emerges through paying attention, on purpose, in the present moment, and non-judgmentally to the unfolding of experience moment by moment."

Yet, Kabat-Zinn has also stated that the word was meant to cover both the intentional application of awareness and "as an umbrella term that subsumes all of the other elements of the Eightfold Noble Path, and indeed, of the dharma itself, at least in implicit form". (Note: Wilson (2014, p. 89) refers to and quotes from Kabat-Zinn's foreword to Clinical Handbook of Mindfulness.)

Williams et al. (2007) define mindfulness as " the awareness that emerges through paying attention on purpose, in the present moment, and non-judgmentally to things as they are".

Bishop et al. (2004), based upon a consensus among clinical psychologists, propose a two-component model of mindfulness, consisting of self-regulated attention, and a particular orientation toward one's experiences characterized by curiosity, openness, and acceptance. (Note: Bishop et al. (2004): "The first component involves the self-regulation of attention so that it is maintained on immediate experience, thereby allowing for increased recognition of mental events in the present moment. The second component involves adopting a particular orientation toward one's experiences in the present moment, an orientation that is characterized by curiosity, openness, and acceptance." Self-regulated attention "involves bringing awareness to current experience—observing and attending to the changing fields of "objects" (thoughts, feelings, sensations), from moment to moment – by regulating the focus of attention". Orientation to experience (the second component) involves maintaining an attitude of curiosity about objects experienced at each moment, and about where and how the mind wanders when it drifts from the selected focus of attention. Clients are asked to avoid trying to produce a particular state (e.g. relaxation), but rather to just notice each object that arises in the stream of consciousness (Bishop et al. 2004, p. 233)

According to Chems-Maarif et al. (2025), psychological definitions "emphasize (a) present-centered awareness and bare attention, and (b) attitudes of acceptance and non-judgment." (Note: Definitions: Marlatt & Kristeller 1999, p. 68: "a way of paying attention"<; Baer 2003: "Paying attention in a particular way: on purpose, in the present moment, and nonjudgmentally"; "Bringing one's complete attention to the present experience on a moment-to-moment basis" (Baer cites Kabat-Zinn, J. (1994): Wherever you go, there you are: Mindfulness meditation in everyday life. New York: Hyperion, p.4.; Black 2011, p. 1: "a capacity of attention and awareness oriented to the present moment that varies in degree within and between individuals, and can be assessed empirically and independent of religious, spiritual, or cultural beliefs."; Bishop et al. 2004: "A kind of nonelaborative, nonjudgmental, present-centered awareness in which each thought, feeling, or sensation that arises in the attentional field is acknowledged and accepted as it is."; According to Jong et al. 2025, mindfulness involves cognitive processes such as attentional monitoring, attentional regulation, and attentional focus reorientation. Hayes 2004 and Feldman have highlighted that mindfulness can be seen as a strategy that stands in contrast to a strategy of avoidance of emotion on the one hand and to the strategy of emotional over-engagement on the other hand.)

The Greater Good Science Center at the University of California, Berkeley describes mindfulness as "maintaining a moment-by-moment awareness of our thoughts, feelings, bodily sensations, and surrounding environment, through a gentle, nurturing lens. [It] involves acceptance, meaning that we pay attention to our thoughts and feelings without judging them [...] our thoughts tune into what we're sensing in the present moment rather than rehashing the past or imagining the future.." (Note: See also Prapanca.)

Alvear et al. (2022) investigated lay (non-academic) theories of mindfulness,identifying seven themes, namely attention/awareness, a non-evaluative attitude, a strategy, a state, personal development, theoretical analyses, and "a lack of understanding of mindfulness".

==== Present-moment awareness and bare attention ====
According to Shonin and Van Gordon, "The practice of mindfulness is fundamentally concerned with becoming more aware of the present moment". Chems-Maarif et al. (2025) note that "Being in the present moment is seen as an important feature in the development of mindfulness in Buddhism", and present-centered awareness and bare attention are also central in the psychological understanding of mindfulness, but they also note that "[o]ther scholars challenge the notion that present-moment focus is at the core of mindfulness, criticizing it as a popular view in contemporary mindfulness definitions, labeled "here-and-now-ism"." (Note: See, for example, Purser & Milillo 2015, p. 13-15, "Mindfulness Is Not Equivalent to Nonjudgmental Awareness". Purser & Milillo (2015, p. 5): "Thus, mindfulness is not merely a passive and nonjudgmental attentiveness to the present moment exclusively but an actively engaged and discerning awareness that is capable of recollecting words and actions from the past as well. As we shall explain shortly, right mindfulness, when properly cultivated and supported by other mental factors, can remember and know skillful as well as unskillful phenomena, in the past and in the present—with the intended purpose of abandoning those which lead toward suffering and stress in the future (Gethin, 2001; Ţhānissaro, 2012). Thus, right mindfulness is not simply bare attention to the present moment but "includes both retrospective memory of the past and prospective memory of the present and future" (Kang & Whittingham, 2010, p. 165).")

Chems-Maarif et al. (2025) also note that "the present-centeredness of awareness and bare attention remains slightly unclear", and that "awareness of the present moment is a vast concept that may need further elucidation as to what it entails." This may be accomplished by clarifying the objects of attention, "connect[ing] the here-and-now to tangible dimensions of experience".

Phenomenologically, the "present moment" may be seen as a constantly changing flux of arising and passing experiences consisting of "constantly changing sensory perceptions and mental events".

Chems-Maarif et al. (2025) note that an emphasis on present-moment awareness does not align with the association of sati with memory and remembrance, invoking the Buddhist teachings to aid right living. Mindfulness, then, is rather being present, and incorporates " clear comprehension and insight into the nature of phenomena".

"Bare attention", which is "attention that is devoid of further processing", a notion popularized by Nyanaponika Thera in the 1960s, who described bare attention (or awareness) as "a bare registering of the facts observed, without reacting to them by deed, speech or mental comment which may be one of self-reference (like, dislike, etc.), judgement or refection." (Note: The notion of "bare awareness" has been criticized by Sharf and others, as sati involves more than just awareness.) Chems-Maarif et al. (2025) also note that "present-centered awareness works to counteract cognitive elaborations on what manifests itself in experience". Yet, "bare attention" has also been interpreted in a more limited, as strictly involving the "bare cognizing of an object". This "bare cognizing" is actually better covered with the term manasikara, whereas mindfulness (sati) has a distinct quality of deliberately paying attention to one's experiences, and "discerning skillful from unskillful actions" and "abandon[ing] unwholesome states [and] cultivate wholesome [states]", and "not drift[ing] away from discerning wholesome from unwholesome mental states".

In the contemporary Vipassana practice, the aim is not so much as to focus on 'the present', but to direct awareness toward the constantly changing stream of experience and to cultivate self-knowledge and wisdom regarding the nature of human experience, developing an understanding that all phenomena and perceptions are without an essence (anatta), impermanent (anicca), and unsatisfactory (dukkha).

==== Domains of attention ====
The Satipatthana Sutta, Majjhima Nikaya 10, delineates four "foundations of mindfulness" or "frames of reference," on which he contemplates or focusses after leaving behind the worldly life: kāyā (body), vedanā (sensations/feelings aroused by perception), cittā (mind/consciousness), and dhammas (elements of the Buddhist teachings).

Chems-Maarif et al. (2025), based on a narrative-review of Buddhist and psychological scientific sources, reject "dharma" and it's underlying soteriological scheme as an object of attention, instead proposing four scopes of mindfulness, namely body sensations, affective valence, cognitive and emotional phenomena, and the external environment.

Bigman-Peer & Yovel (2024) distinguish two interconnected domains of experience, namely external sensory experiences "such as such as sights, sounds, smells or bodily sensations", and internal mental experiences, "thoughts, memories, concepts, which entail a conceptual system that is based on general knowledge and previous experiences".

==== Acceptance and non-reactivity ====
According to Chems-Maarif et al. (2025), "non-judgment and acceptance can be viewed as the core of the "how" of mindfulness". Related terms are curiosity, openness, receptivity, and non-attachment, which can be summarized as "the equanimous attitude".

The Greater Good Science Center explains that acceptance involves paying attention to our thoughts and feelings "without judging them" and without "rehashing the past or imagining the future." Likewise, Chems-Maarif et al. (2025) state that acceptance consists of "observing judgments for what they are (i.e., thoughts) and allowing them to be without further elaboration". They further state that "acceptance means being receptive and open, to take in all experiences without avoiding, resisting, or judging them".

Bigman-Peer & Yovel (2024) note that mindfulness enhances self-control and self-regulation, which "enables individuals to observe their experiences as they unfold without reacting to them automatically", and that practitioners strive "to avoid allowing the mind to wander into chains of associations that are disengaged from the present moment". Mindfulness "facilitates decentering — a greater psychological distance — from one's thoughts and emotions", which "liberates awareness from rigidly structured narratives concerning the self and the world, and promotes the ability to make fexible and adaptive choices in responding to various situations", enabling practitioners "to reduce the emotional and somatic arousal that may be associated with a concrete processing mode".

== Historical development ==
=== Buddhism ===
Mindfulness as a modern, Western practice is founded on Zen and modern Vipassanā, (Note: Vipassana as taught by teachers from the Vipassana movement is a 19th-century development, inspired by and reacting against Western modernism. See also Buddhist modernism.) and involves the training of sati, which means "moment to moment awareness of present events", but also "remembering to be aware of something".

==== Early Buddhism ====
Sati is one of the seven factors of enlightenment. "Correct" or "right" mindfulness (Pali: sammā-sati, Sanskrit samyak-smṛti) is the seventh element of the Noble Eightfold Path. Mindfulness is an antidote to delusion and is considered as a 'power' (Pali: bala) which contributes to the attainment of Nibbana. This faculty becomes a power in particular when it is coupled with clear comprehension of whatever is taking place. Nirvana is a state of being in which greed, hatred and delusion (Pali: moha) have been overcome and abandoned, and are absent from the mind.

According to Thomas William Rhys Davids, the doctrine of mindfulness is "perhaps the most important" after the Four Noble Truths and the Noble Eightfold Path. T.W. Rhys Davids viewed the teachings of Gotama Buddha as a rational technique for self-actualization and rejected a few parts of it, mainly the doctrine of rebirth, as residual superstitions.

According to Paul Williams, referring to Erich Frauwallner, mindfulness provided the way in Early Buddhism to liberation, "constantly watching sensory experience in order to prevent the arising of cravings which would power future experience into rebirths." (Note: Frauwallner, E. (1973), History of Indian Philosophy, trans. V.M. Bedekar, Delhi: Motilal Banarsidass. Two volumes., pp.150 ff) According to Vetter, Jhanas may have been the original core practice of the Buddha, which aided the maintenance of mindfulness.

According to Grzegorz Polak, the four upassanā (foundations of mindfulness) have been misunderstood by the developing Buddhist tradition, including Theravada, to refer to four different foundations. According to Polak, the four upassanā do not refer to four different foundations, but to the awareness of four different aspects of raising mindfulness:

- the six sense-bases which one needs to be aware of (kāyānupassanā);
- contemplation on vedanās, which arise with the contact between the senses and their objects (vedanānupassanā);
- the altered states of mind to which this practice leads (cittānupassanā);
- the development from the five hindrances to the seven factors of enlightenment (dhammānupassanā).

=== Western predecessors ===
==== Stoicism ====
The Greek philosophical school of Stoicism founded by Zeno of Citium included practices resembling those of mindfulness, such as visualization exercises. In his Discourses, Stoic philosopher Epictetus addresses in particular the concept of attention (prosoche), an idea also found in Seneca and Marcus Aurelius. By cultivating it over time, this skill would prevent the practitioner from becoming unattentive and moved by instinct rather than according to reason.

==== Christianity ====
Mindfulness traditions are also found in some Christian spiritual traditions. In his Rules for Eating, St. Ignatius of Loyola teaches, "let him guard against all his soul being intent on what he is eating, and in eating let him not go hurriedly, through appetite, but be master of himself, as well in the manner of eating as in the quantity which he eats." He might have been inspired by Epictetus' Enchiridion.

In addition, Jesus himself, in his Sermon on the Mount, said, "Therefore do not worry about tomorrow, for tomorrow will worry about itself. Each day has enough trouble of its own." —Matthew 6:34 (NIV)

==== Transcendentalism ====
Mindfulness practitioner Jon Kabat-Zinn refers to Thoreau as a predecessor of the interest in mindfulness, together with other eminent Transcendentalists such as Emerson and Whitman:

The collective experience (Note: The resort to "experience" as the ground for religious truths is a strategy which goes back to Schleiermacher, as a defense against the growing influence of western rationality on the religious life of Europeans in the 19th century. See Sharf (1995), Buddhist Modernism and the Rhetoric of Meditative Experience.) of sages, yogis, and Zen masters offers a view of the world which is complementary to the predominantly reductionist and materialistic one currently dominating Western thought and institutions. But this view is neither particularly "Eastern" nor mystical. Thoreau saw the same problem with our ordinary mind state in New England in 1846 and wrote with great passion about its unfortunate consequences.

=== Mutual syncretism ===
==== Influence of Transcendentalism ====
The forms of Asian religion and spirituality which were introduced in the west were themselves influenced by Transcendentalism and other 19th-century manifestations of Western esotericism. Transcendentalism was closely connected to the Unitarian Church, which in India collaborated with Ram Mohan Roy (1772–1833) and his Brahmo Samaj. He found that Unitarianism came closest to true Christianity, and had a strong sympathy for the Unitarians. This influence worked through on Vivekananda, whose modern but idiosyncratic interpretation of Hinduism became widely popular in the west.

==== Vipassana ====
Vipassana meditation, presented as a centuries-old meditation system, was a 19th-century reinvention, which gained popularity in south-east Asia due to the accessibility of the Buddhist sutras through English translations from the Pali Text Society. It was brought to western attention in the 19th century by the Theosophical Society. Vipassanā-meditation has gained popularity in the west through the modern Buddhist vipassana movement, modeled after Theravāda Buddhist meditation practices, which employs vipassanā and ānāpāna meditation as its primary techniques and places emphasis on the teachings of the Satipaṭṭhāna Sutta. Key people were Jack Kornfield, Joseph Goldstein, Sharon Salzburg, and Jacqueline Schwartz, who established the Insight Meditation Society in 1976, representing a lineage of a contemporary form of meditation developed by Ledi Sayadaw and Mahasi Sayadaw.

==== Zen-Buddhism ====
Zen Buddhism first gained popularity in the west through the writings of D.T. Suzuki, who attempted to present a modern interpretation of Zen, adjusted to western tastes. According to Harrington and Dunne, Suzuki had a pioneering influence on western humanist and existentialist psychotherapists with his efforts "to transform aspects of Zen Buddhism into a resource for new, existentialist forms of psychoanalytic psychotherapy." Those psychotherapists confronted existential challenges in their patients, who "were uniquely burdened by the drive to conform, produce, and consume at all costs, even as they were haunted by the specter of atomic devastation." They needed a new approach, less oriented to therapy as a cure for illness, but more as "a way of addressing the supposed root causes of patients' spiritual emptiness, anxiety, and alienation." Suzuki was an easily accessible source for an alternate approach, as he was deeply steeped and educated in western philosophical and psycho-analytic thought, and presented his view on Zen in a way that was recognisable for westerners. While enthusiastically received by a number of psycho-analysts, including Erich Fromm, there was also criticism, most notably from Scaligero and from Ernst Becker.

Another Zen-influence was Thích Nhất Hạnh, a "reform-minded modernist Buddhist" Vietnamese monk who studied in the USA in the early 1960s, exiled to France in 1967, and started teaching Zen-meditation to westerners in the 1970s. Thích Nhất Hạnh belonged to the Vietnamese Thiền tradition, which is also influenced by Theravada Buddhism.

=== Psychology and secular mindfulness ===
According to Laura Buchholz, "Herbert Benson, MD, founder of the Benson-Henry Institute for Mind Body Medicine at Massachusetts General Hospital, is often credited with bringing mindfulness into the realm of Western medicine. His 1975 book The Relaxation Response outlined techniques to combat the harmful effects of stress with relaxation methods similar to meditation." Mindfulness was integrated into health-programs and psychotherapy by the pioneering work of Jon Kabat-Zinn, Zindel Segal, and Mark Williams.

==== Jon Kabat-Zinn and MBSR ====
Jon Kabat-Zinn is the key figure in the development and popularisation of MBSR. Trained as a molecular biologist, he was introduced in 1966 to meditation when he attended a lecture by Philip Kapleau on Zen at MIT where Kabat-Zinn was a student, and subsequently participated in sesshins led by Kapleau, studied with Seung Sahn, practiced insight meditation at the Insight Meditation Society, and also practiced hatha yoga.

In 1979, during a vipassana-retreat at the IMS, he had a comprehensive "vision" of how "the essence of meditation" could be shared "with those who would never be able to hear it through words and forms that were being used at meditation centers" and could be implementated in secular contexts, which would "spark new fields of scientific and clinical investigation and would spread to hospitals and medical centres and clinics across the country around the world, and provide right livelihood for thosands of practitioners".

The same year, in 1979, Kabat-Zinn founded the Mindfulness-Based Stress Reduction (MBSR) program at the University of Massachusetts to treat the chronically ill. This program sparked the application of mindfulness ideas and practices in Medicine for the treatment of a variety of conditions in both healthy and unhealthy people. MBSR and similar programs are now widely applied in schools, prisons, hospitals, veterans centers, and other environments.

One of MBSR's techniques—the "body scan"—was derived from a meditation practice ("sweeping") of the Burmese U Ba Khin tradition, as taught by S. N. Goenka in his Vipassana retreats, which he began in 1976. The body scan method has since been widely adapted to secular settings, independent of religious or cultural contexts. (Note: "Historically a Buddhist practice, mindfulness can be considered a universal human capacity proposed to foster clear thinking and open-heartedness. As such, this form of meditation requires no particular religious or cultural belief system." - Mindfulness in Medicine by Ludwig and Kabat-Zinn, available at jama.ama-assn.org) (Note: "Kabat-Zinn (2000) suggests that mindfulness practice may be beneficial to many people in Western society who might be unwilling to adopt Buddhist traditions or vocabulary. Thus, Western researchers and clinicians who have introduced mindfulness practice into mental health treatment programs usually teach these skills independently of the religious and cultural traditions of their origins (Kabat-Zinn, 1982; Linehan, 1993b).")

Kabat-Zinn was also influenced by the book The Varieties of Religious Experience by William James which suggests that religions point toward the same experience, and which 1960s counterculture figures interpreted as meaning that the same universal, experiential truth could be reached in different ways, including via non-religious activities.

==== Popularization, "mindfulness movement" ====
Mindfulness is gaining a growing popularity as a practice in daily life, apart from Buddhist insight meditation and its application in clinical psychology, and can be practiced outside a formal setting. The terminology used by scholars of religion, scientists, journalists, and popular media writers to describe this movement of mindfulness "popularization," and the many new contexts of mindfulness practice which have cropped up, has regularly evolved over the past 20 years, with some criticisms arising.

The global Covid-19 pandemic (2020-2022) has contributed to this popularization, when people moved from real-life meditation sessions to the applications on their smart devices. Modern applications are adapting to the needs of their users by using AI technology, involving professional psychologists and offering many different mindfulness approaches to serve a wider audience, such as among athletes.

== Practice ==
=== Buddhism ===
==== Theravada and contemporary vipassana-meditation ====
In a Buddhist context the keeping of moral precepts is an essential preparatory stage for mindfulness or meditation. The aim of mindfulness, according to Buddhadasa, is to stop the arising of disturbing thoughts and emotions, which arise from sense-contact.

In modern vipassana-meditation, as propagated by the Vipassana movement, sati aids vipassana, insight into the true nature of reality, namely the three marks of existence, the impermanence of and the suffering of every conditioned thing that exists, and non-self. Through this insight, practitioner may attain the state of Sotāpanna, a "stream-enterer", the first stage on the path to liberation. (Note: In Mahayana contexts, it entails insight into what is variously described as sunyata, dharmata, the inseparability of appearance and emptiness (two truths doctrine), clarity and emptiness, or bliss and emptiness.)

Vipassana is practiced in tandem with Samatha, and also plays a central role in other Buddhist traditions. According to the contemporary Theravada orthodoxy, Samatha is used as a preparation for Vipassanā, pacifying the mind and strengthening the concentration in order to allow the work of insight, which leads to liberation.

Vipassana also includes reflections on causation and other Buddhist teachings, and insight in how thoughts and feelings arise following input from the senses.

===== Anapanasati, satipaṭṭhāna, and vipassana =====
Anapanasati is mindfulness of breathing. "Sati" means mindfulness; "ānāpāna" refers to inhalation and exhalation. The practice involves attending to sensations caused by the movements of the breath in the body. The Anapanasati Sutta gives an exposition on this practice. (Note: Majjhima Nikaya (MN), sutta number 118. See Thanissaro, 2006. Other discourses that describe the full four tetrads can be found in the Samyutta Nikaya's Anapana-samyutta (Ch. 54), such as SN 54.6 (Thanissaro, 2006a), SN 54.8 (Thanissaro, 2006b) and SN 54.13 (Thanissaro, 1995a). The one-tetrad exposition of anapanasati is found, for instance, in the Kayagata-sati Sutta (MN 119; Thanissaro, 1997), the Maha-satipatthana Sutta (DN 22; Thanissaro, 2000) and the Satipatthana Sutta (MN 10; Thanissaro, 1995b).)

Satipaṭṭhāna is the establishment of mindfulness in one's day-to-day life, maintaining as much as possible a calm awareness of one's body, feelings, mind, and dhammas. The practice of mindfulness supports analysis resulting in the arising of wisdom (Pali: paññā, Sanskrit: prajñā).

===== Samprajaña, apramāda and atappa =====
In contemporary Theravada practice, "mindfulness" also includes samprajaña, meaning "clear comprehension" and apramāda meaning "vigilance". (Note: [I]n Buddhist discourse, there are three terms that together map the field of mindfulness [...] [in their Sanskrit variants] smṛti (Pali: sati), samprajaña (Pali: Sampajañña) and apramāda (Pali: appamada).) All three terms are sometimes (confusingly) translated as "mindfulness", but they all have specific shades of meaning.

In a publicly available correspondence between Bhikkhu Bodhi and B. Alan Wallace, Bodhi has described Ven. Nyanaponika Thera's views on "right mindfulness" and sampajañña as follows:

He held that in the proper practice of right mindfulness, sati has to be integrated with sampajañña, clear comprehension, and it is only when these two work together that right mindfulness can fulfill its intended purpose. (Note: According to this correspondence, Ven. Nyanaponika spent his last ten years living with and being cared for by Bodhi. Bodhi refers to Nyanaponika as "my closest kalyāṇamitta in my life as a monk.")

==== Zen ====
The aim of Soto-zazen is just sitting, that is, suspending all judgmental thinking and letting words, ideas, images and thoughts pass by without getting involved in them.

=== Secular mindfulness ===
Mindfulness practice involves the process of developing the skill of bringing one's attention to whatever is happening in the present moment. Mindfulness is usually developed through meditation or sustained practice. According to Steven F. Hick, mindfulness practice involves both formal and informal meditation practices, and nonmeditation-based exercises. Formal mindfulness, or meditation, is the practice of sustaining attention on body, breath or sensations, or whatever arises in each moment. Informal mindfulness is the application of mindful attention in everyday life. Nonmeditation-based exercises are specifically used in dialectical behavior therapy and in acceptance and commitment therapy.

==== Watching the breath, body-scan and other techniques ====
There are several exercises designed to develop mindfulness meditation, which may be aided by guided meditations "to get the hang of it". (Note: Kabat-Zinn, in Full Catastrophe Living (Revised Edition) (2013), p. lxiv advises to use CD's with guided mindfulness practices: "Almost everybody finds it easier, when embarking for the first time on a daily meditation practice, to listen to an instructor-guided audio program and let it "carry them along" in the early stages, until they get the hang of it from the inside, rather than attempting to follow instructions from a book, however clear and detailed they may be." Compare Rupert Gethin (2004), On the practice of Buddhist meditation, pp. 202–03, noting that the Buddhist sutras hardly explain how to meditate, and then stating that "the effective practice of meditation requires the personal instruction of a teacher." Gethin seems to echo Vetter (1988), The Ideas and Meditative Practices of Early Buddhism, who notes that the Dhammacakkappavattana Sutta describes the Buddha as instructing his first followers in turn: instructing two or three of them, while the others go out begging for food, signifying the need for personal instruction to learn how to practice dhyana.)

- One method is to sit in a straight-backed chair or sit cross-legged on the floor, or a cushion, close one's eyes and bring attention to either the sensations of breathing in the proximity of one's nostrils or to the movements of the abdomen when breathing in and out. In this meditation practice, one does not try to control one's breathing, but attempts to simply be aware of one's natural breathing process/rhythm. When engaged in this practice, the mind will often run off to other thoughts and associations, if this happens, one passively notices that the mind has wandered, and in an accepting, but non-judgmental way, returns to focusing on breathing.
- In body-scan meditation the attention is directed at various areas of the body and noting body sensations that happen in the present moment.
- One could also focus on sounds, sensations, thoughts, feelings and actions that happen in the present. In this regard, a famous exercise, introduced by Kabat-Zinn in his MBSR program, is the mindful tasting of a raisin, in which a raisin is tasted and eaten mindfully. (Note: See also Eating One Raisin: A First Taste of Mindfulness for a hand-out file) By enabling reconnection with internal hunger and satiety cues, mindful eating has been suggested to be a means of maintaining healthy and conscious eating patterns.
- Other approaches include practicing yoga asanas while attending to movements and body sensations, and walking meditation.

==== Timings ====
Meditators are recommended to start with short periods of 10 minutes or so of meditation practice per day. As one practices regularly, it becomes easier to keep the attention focused on breathing.

== Secular applications ==
According to Jon Kabat-Zinn the practice of mindfulness may be beneficial to many people in Western society who might be unwilling to adopt Buddhist traditions or vocabulary. Western researchers and clinicians who have introduced mindfulness practice into mental health treatment programs usually teach these skills independently of the religious and cultural traditions of their origins. Programs based on MBSR and similar models have been widely adopted in schools, prisons, hospitals, veterans centers, and other environments.

=== Therapy programs ===
==== Mindfulness-based stress reduction ====
Mindfulness-based stress reduction (MBSR) is a mindfulness-based program developed by Jon Kabat-Zinn at the University of Massachusetts Medical Center, which uses a combination of mindfulness meditation, body awareness, and yoga to help people become more mindful. While MBSR has its roots in spiritual teachings, the program itself is secular.

==== Mindfulness-based cognitive therapy ====
Mindfulness-based cognitive therapy (MBCT) is a psychological therapy designed to aid in preventing the relapse of depression, specifically in individuals with Major depressive disorder (MDD). It uses traditional cognitive behavioral therapy (CBT) methods and adds in newer psychological strategies such as mindfulness and mindfulness meditation. Cognitive methods can include educating the participant about depression. Mindfulness and mindfulness meditation focus on becoming aware of all incoming thoughts and feelings and accepting them, but not attaching or reacting to them.

Like CBT, MBCT functions on the theory that when individuals who have historically had depression become distressed, they return to automatic cognitive processes that can trigger a depressive episode. The goal of MBCT is to interrupt these automatic processes and teach the participants to focus less on reacting to incoming stimuli, and instead accepting and observing them without judgment. This mindfulness practice allows the participant to notice when automatic processes are occurring and to alter their reaction to be more of a reflection. Research supports the effects of MBCT in people who have been depressed three or more times and demonstrates reduced relapse rates by 50%.

==== Acceptance and commitment therapy ====
Acceptance and commitment therapy or (ACT) (typically pronounced as the word "act") is a form of clinical behavior analysis (CBA) used in psychotherapy. It is a psychological intervention that uses acceptance and mindfulness strategies mixed in different ways with commitment and behavior-change strategies, to increase psychological flexibility. The approach was originally called comprehensive distancing. It was developed in the late 1980s by Steven C. Hayes, Kelly G. Wilson, and Kirk Strosahl. It was popularised in the early 2000s by Dr. Russ Harris with The Happiness Trap (2007).

==== Dialectical behavior therapy ====
Mindfulness is a "core" exercise used in dialectical behavior therapy (DBT), a psychosocial treatment Marsha M. Linehan developed for treating people with borderline personality disorder. DBT is dialectic, says Linehan, in the sense of "the reconciliation of opposites in a continual process of synthesis." As a practitioner of Buddhist meditation techniques, Linehan says:

This emphasis in DBT on a balance of acceptance and change owes much to my experiences in studying meditation and Eastern spirituality. The DBT tenets of observing, mindfulness, and avoidance of judgment are all derived from the study and practice of Zen meditations.

==== Mode deactivation therapy ====
Mode deactivation therapy (MDT) is a treatment methodology that is derived from the principles of cognitive-behavioral therapy and incorporates elements of Acceptance and commitment therapy, Dialectical behavior therapy, and mindfulness techniques. Mindfulness techniques such as simple breathing exercises are applied to assist the client in awareness and non-judgmental acceptance of unpleasant and distressing thoughts and feelings as they occur in the present moment. Mode Deactivation Therapy was developed and is established as an effective treatment for adolescents with problem behaviors and complex trauma-related psychological problems, according to recent publications by Jack A. Apsche and Joan Swart.

==== Other programs ====
The Japanese psychiatrist Shoma Morita, who trained in Zen meditation, developed Morita therapy upon principles of mindfulness and non-attachment.

Internal Family Systems Model (IFS), developed by Richard C. Schwartz, emphasizes the importance of both therapist and client engaging in therapy from the Self, which is the IFS term for one's "spiritual center". The Self is curious about whatever arises in one's present experience and open and accepting toward all manifestations.

Mindfulness relaxation uses breathing methods, guided imagery, and other practices to relax the body and mind and help reduce stress.

=== Education ===
In the USA, mindfulness practices are becoming more common within educational institutions including Elementary and Secondary schools. The applications of mindfulness in schools are aimed at calming and relaxation, to build compassion and empathy for others, and to reduce anxiety and stress in students. Based on a broad meta-analytical review, Zenner et al. (2014) concluded that the application of mindfulness practice shows an improvement of students' attention and focus, emotional regulation, creativity, and problem solving skills. A 2026 systematic review found that in school and community settings, mindfulness programs produced small, mostly short-term improvements that varied by age. This identified modestly fewer behavior problems in 3 to 8-year-olds, better attention in 9 to 14-year-olds, and slightly lower anxiety and depression in 15 to 18-year-olds.

Available research reveals a relationship between mindfulness, attention, the reducement of anxiety, and "improvements in behavioral regulation, metacognition, and overall executive functions". Yet, Johnson et al. (2016) concluded that "no improvements were demonstrated on any outcome measured either immediately post-intervention or at three-month follow-up".

=== Business ===
Mindfulness training appears to be getting popular in the business world, and many large corporations have been incorporating mindfulness practices into their culture. For example, companies such as Google, Apple, Procter & Gamble, General Mills, Mayo Clinic, and the U.S. Army offer mindfulness coaching, meditation breaks and other resources to their employees to improve workplace functioning.

The introduction of mindfulness in corporate settings still remains in early stages and its potential long-term impact requires further assessment. Mindfulness has been found to result in better employee well-being, lower levels of frustration, lower absenteeism and burnout as well as an improved overall work environment.

=== Law ===
Legal and law enforcement organizations are also showing interest in mindfulness:

- Harvard Law School's Program on Negotiation hosted a workshop on "Mindfulness in the Law & Alternative Dispute Resolution."
- Many law firms offer mindfulness classes.

=== Prison-programs ===
Mindfulness has been taught in prisons, reducing hostility and mood disturbance among inmates, and improving their self-esteem. Additional studies indicate that mindfulness interventions can result in significant reductions in anger, reductions in substance use, increased relaxation capacity, self-regulation and optimism.

=== Government ===
Many government organizations offer mindfulness training. Coping Strategies is an example of a program utilized by United States Armed Forces personnel. The British Parliament organized a mindfulness-session for its members in 2014, led by Ruby Wax.

=== Sport ===
Mindfulness is gaining popularity in sports, with mindfulness practices being integrated as parts of teams routines.

== Scientific research ==
Mindfulness has gained increasing empirical attention since 1970 and has been studied extensively for different patient populations. Meta analyses indicate its beneficial effects for healthy adults, (Note: Khoury et al. 2015: "We conducted a meta-analysis to provide a review of MBSR for healthy individuals. The meta-analysis included 29 studies enrolling 2668 participants [...] The results obtained are robust and are maintained at follow-up. When combined, mindfulness and compassion strongly correlated with clinical effects.) for adolescents and for children.

=== Increase in mindfulness ===
Meta-analyses have shown that mindfulness-based interventions (such as structured mindfulness training programs) lead to greater increases in measured mindfulness, typically assessed using validated trait- and state-mindfulness scales, compared with active control conditions.

=== Mental health ===
Studies have shown a positive relationship between trait mindfulness and psychological health. In an overview, Keng, Smoski, and Robins (2021) state that "Trait mindfulness has been associated with higher levels of life satisfaction, agreeableness, conscientiousness, vitality, self esteem, empathy, sense of autonomy, competence, optimism, and pleasant affect." Xiao et al. (2020) found links between dispositional mindfulness and prosocial behavior.

Meta-analyses indicate positive behavioral and mental health-related outcomes for different health problems, including ADHD, and drugs and alcohol abuse. Mindfulness appears to be a beneficial intervention for children with special needs and their caregivers, including autism treatment. The practice of mindfulness appears to provide therapeutic benefits to people with psychiatric disorders, including moderate benefits to those with psychosis.

Studies indicate that rumination and worry contribute to a variety of mental disorders. Mindfulness-based interventions can enhance trait mindfulness and reduce both rumination and worry. Mindfulness practices have been said to enable individuals to respond more effectively to stressful situations by helping them strike the balance between over-identification and suppression of their emotional experiences by finding the middle point which is recognition and acceptance.

Mindfulness practices have also been associated with the development of psychological resilience. Regular mindfulness meditation can help individuals facing trauma or chronic stress to regulate emotions, reduce rumination, and strengthen adaptive coping mechanisms. Further, the practice of mindfulness may be a preventive strategy to halt the development of mental-health problems. It is also a viable treatment option for people with insomnia, an effective intervention for healthy aging, and has also been used to improve athletic performance,

Studies have shown that mindfulness meditation contributes to a more coherent and healthy sense of self and identity, with regard to aspects such as sense of responsibility, authenticity, compassion, self-acceptance and character.

While some studies have questioned the effects of mindfulness on prosocial behaviours, review articles on this subject generally indicate that mindfulness promotes prosocial behaviour although more longitudinal studies are needed to confirm this.

=== Physical health ===
Meta-analyses also indicate positive physical health-related outcomes for different health problems, including weight management, heart disease, sleep disorders, cancer care, multiple sclerosis, and other health-related conditions. The practice of mindfulness has also been used as a strategy for managing dermatological conditions and as a useful intervention during early pregnancy. Recent studies have also demonstrated that mindfulness meditation significantly attenuates physical pain through multiple, unique mechanisms.

Meditation also may allow one to modulate pain. When exposed to pain from heating, the brain scans of the mindfulness meditation participants (by use of functional magnetic resonance imaging) showed their brains notice the pain equally, however it does not get converted to a perceived pain signal. As such they experienced up to 40–50% less pain.

The psychological habit of repeatedly dwelling on stressful thoughts appears to intensify the physiological effects of the stressor (as a result of the continual activation of the sympathetic nervous system and the hypothalamus-pituitary-adrenal axis) with the potential to lead to physical-health-related clinical manifestations. Studies indicate that mindfulness meditation, which brings about reductions in rumination, may alter these biological clinical pathways. Further, research indicates that mindfulness may favorably influence the immune system as well as inflammation, which can consequently impact physical health, especially considering that inflammation has been linked to the development of several chronic health conditions. Other studies support these findings.

Mindfulness meditation may prevent or delay the onset of mild cognitive impairment and Alzheimer's disease.

Research suggests that the practice of mindfulness could influence genetic expression leading to a reduced risk of inflammation-related diseases and favourable changes in biomarkers.

=== Neurological studies - functional and structural changes ===
The effects of mindfulness on the brain have been studied using neuroimaging techniques, physiological measures and behavioral tests.

Mindfulness-induced emotional and behavioral changes have been found to be related to functional and structural changes in the brain. Ruther et al. (2026) found that 'Mindfulness-based stress reduction' appears to influence brain function more than structure, with consistent enhancement of activity and connectivity in networks that support emotion regulation, self-referential processing, and attention.

Neurological research suggests that mindfulness influences components of attention regulation, body awareness and emotional regulation.

Grey matter concentrations in brain regions that regulate emotion, self-referential processing, learning and memory processes have shown changes in density following MBSR.

Neuroimaging techniques suggest that mindfulness practices are associated with "changes in the anterior cingulate cortex, insula, temporo-parietal junction, fronto-limbic network and default mode network structures."

MBSR practice has been associated with improvement of the immune system which could explain the correlation between stress reduction and increased quality of life. Part of these changes are a result of the thickening of the prefrontal cortex (executive functioning) and hippocampus (learning and memorisation ability), the shrinking of the amygdala (emotion and stress response) and the strengthening of the connections between brain cells. Long-term meditators have larger amounts of gyrification ("folding" of the cortex, which may allow the brain to process information faster) than people who do not meditate. Further, a direct correlation was found between the amount of gyrification and the number of meditation years, possibly providing further proof of the brain's neuroplasticity, or ability to adapt to environmental changes.

Simon and Engström (2015) suggest that the default mode network of the brain can be used as a potential biomarker for monitoring the therapeutic benefits of meditation.

=== Contributing factors ===
Mindfulness may be dose-dependent, increasing with greater practice experience. Bergomi et al. (2015) found that "mindfulness is particularly associated with continued practice in the present, rather than with accumulated practice over years."

Suelmann et al. (2018) found that mindfulness was associated with the intention to be mindful; with feeling good; and with not being hurried or very busy. Goting et al. (2016) found that causality probably reciprocal: feeling good increases mindfulness, and mindfulness increases feeling good.

Shapiro et al. (2006) suggest that through reperceiving, which takes place after the mindful-practice itself, there is a shift in perspective, permitting disassociation from thoughts, emotions, and physical sensations, and allowing one to exist with them instead of being defined by them.

=== Lack of support for beneficial effects ===
Goyal et al. (2014), an often-cited meta-analysis on meditation research, found insufficient evidence of any effect of meditation programs on positive mood, attention, substance use, eating habits, sleep, and weight, but found that there is moderate evidence that meditation reduces anxiety, depression, and pain. However, this study included a highly heterogeneous group of meditation styles (i.e., it did not focus exclusively on mindfulness meditation), which is a significant limitation of this study. Additionally, while mindfulness is well known to have positive psychological effects among individuals diagnosed with various types of cancers, the evidence is unclear regarding its effectiveness in men with prostate cancer.

=== Adverse effects ===
Meditation in general (of which mindfulness is just one type) has been correlated with unpleasant experiences in some individuals, in a number of studies. These studies, however, examined a range of meditation practices rather than focusing exclusively on mindfulness meditation, and some had important methodological limitations, including cross-sectional designs, self-selected samples, reliance on self-reports, and the absence of non-intervention control groups when relevant. Other studies have specifically investigated potential adverse effects associated with mindfulness meditation, as described below.

A 2022 study of more than 2,400 participants, using health records from 2,155 MBSR participants and data from 274 participants in randomized controlled trials (RCTs), assessed harm relative to what would have occurred without treatment and found no evidence that MBSR increased psychological or physical harm, with some measures additionally suggesting that MBSR may protect against multiple forms of harm.

Similarly, a 2024 randomized trial of 708 patients with chronic pain found that mindfulness-based interventions did not increase psychological or physical harm compared with usual care, with participants receiving mindfulness-based interventions showing significantly lower rates of deterioration across the outcomes assessed.

A 2024 prospective matched-control study of 136 participants (89 retreat participants and 47 matched controls) found that, although unpleasant experiences were common, they occurred at similar rates among participants in intensive six-day mindfulness meditation retreats and matched controls in daily life. Experiences associated with the retreats were primarily pleasant, and at two-week follow-up, the overall impact of reported experiences was rated as more beneficial than adverse.

Another study examined potential risk factors for sudden unusual mental or somatic experiences, termed “emergent phenomena” (EP), and for subsequent suffering, using survey data from 3,133 adults. Using logistic regression, the researchers found that the strongest practice-related risk factors associated with moderate-or-greater suffering following EP were having attempted divine, magical, or occult practices, past psychedelic use, and contemplation of mysteries. In contrast, specific mindfulness meditation techniques were not associated with an increased likelihood of suffering following EP. This study also found that mindfulness meditation techniques are not associated with negative experiences.

A 2026 meta-analysis using individual participant data from nine randomized clinical trials involving 1,258 adults with recurrent major depressive disorder in remission or partial remission, published in JAMA Network Open, found no evidence that MBCT increased the odds of depressive symptom worsening compared with control conditions. with some research additionally suggesting that mindfulness meditation may even protect against multiple forms of harm.

According to Salguero, medieval Chinese Buddhist texts suggest that “the best way to address the ill effects of meditation is to modify one’s meditation and continue practicing.” A number of Western Buddhist teachers and leaders, have also asserted that proper instruction from a legitimate, genuinely insightful teacher prevents negative experiences in meditation from escalating into adverse or harmful effects. Studies also indicate that people who experience adverse effects as fleeting emotions (i.e., seeing them as a passing phase) without identifying with these experiences are able to overcome distress. Further, balancing concentration practices with open-monitoring practices, incorporating loving-kindness meditation, and even adding physical activity may help prevent any negative experiences from escalating into harmful effects. It has been proposed that a lack of understanding of the theoretical basis of meditation may also play a major causal role in the development of adverse effects. Other studies on adverse effects have found that participants who experience these effects are just as glad to have practiced meditation as those who do not, and that they continue to view meditation as a valuable activity that supports their mental wellbeing.

== Concerns and criticism ==
=== Methodological concerns ===
The methodological quality of some of the studies is poor. Recent reviews have described many of these issues.

Many of the above cited review studies also indicate the necessity for more high-quality research in this field such as conducting intervention studies using larger sample sizes, the use of more randomized controlled studies and the need for providing more methodological details in reported studies. The majority of studies also either measure mindfulness as a trait, and in research that use mindfulness interventions in clinical practice, the lack of true randomisation poses a problem for understanding the true effectiveness of mindfulness. Experimental methods using randomised samples, though, suggest that mindfulness as a state or temporary practice can influence felt emotions such as disgust and promote abstract decision-making. There are also a few review studies that have found little difference between mindfulness interventions and control groups, though they did also indicate that their intervention group was treated too briefly for the research to be conclusive. In some domains, such as sport, a lack of internal validity across studies prevents any strong claims being made about the effects of mindfulness. These studies also list the need for more robust research investigations. Several issues pertaining to the assessment of mindfulness have also been identified including the current use of self-report questionnaires. Potential for bias also exists to the extent that researchers in the field are also practitioners and possibly subject to pressures to publish positive or significant results.

=== McMindfulness ===
The popularization of mindfulness as a "commodity" has been criticized, being termed "McMindfulness" by some critics. Ronald Purser discusses that there is certainly a beneficial aspect to mindfulness, such as reducing stress, however, the issue is the "product they are selling and how its been packaged." According to Harrington and Dunne, critics argue that "Mindfulness [...] was never supposed to be about weight loss, better sex, helping children perform better in school, helping employees be more productive in the workplace, or even improving the functioning of anxious, depressed people. It was never supposed to be a merchandized commodity to be bought and sold." According to John Safran, the popularity of mindfulness is the result of a marketing strategy: "McMindfulness is the marketing of a constructed dream; an idealized lifestyle; an identity makeover." The psychologist Thomas Joiner says that modern mindfulness meditation has been "corrupted" for commercial gain by self-help celebrities, and suggests that it encourages unhealthy narcissistic and self-obsessed mindsets.

According to Monteiro, Muster, and Compson, secular mindfulness has been criticized for treating mindfulness apart from the rest of the Buddhist path. They describe the criticism that attention practiced without this ethical context can amount to "wrong mindfulness" and can be used for harmful purposes. The article also gives the response that ethics can be present in mindfulness based programs without being taught separately, including through the conduct of the teacher, though whether implicit ethics are sufficient is unresolved.

According to Purser and Loy, mindfulness is not being used as a means to awaken to insight in the "unwholesome roots of greed, ill will and delusion," but reshaped into a "banal, therapeutic, self-help technique" that has the opposite effect of reinforcing those passions. While mindfulness is marketed as a means to reduce stress, in a Buddhist context it is part of an all-embracing ethical program to foster "wise action, social harmony, and compassion." Purser explains that ultimately mindfulness is being stripped from its original Buddhist roots, losing its emphasis on ethical training and liberation from attachment, and is instead presented mainly as a therapeutic self-help method. Others have similarly noted that while secular mindfulness can provide benefits such as stress reduction and psychological relief, these benefits should not be equated with the more profound transformation described in Buddhist teachings. The privatization of mindfulness neglects the societal and organizational causes of stress and discomfort, instead propagating adaptation to these circumstances. According to Bhikkhu Bodhi, "[A]bsent a sharp social critique, Buddhist practices could easily be used to justify and stabilize the status quo, becoming a reinforcement of consumer capitalism." The popularity of this new brand of mindfulness has resulted in the commercialization of meditation through self-help books, guided meditation classes, and mindfulness retreats.

Mindfulness is said to be a $4bn industry. More than 60,000 books for sale on Amazon have a variant of "mindfulness" in their title, touting the benefits of Mindful Parenting, Mindful Eating, Mindful Teaching, Mindful Therapy, Mindful Leadership, Mindful Finance, a Mindful Nation, and Mindful Dog Owners, to name just a few.

Buddhist commentators have criticized the movement as being presented as equivalent to Buddhist practice, while in reality it is very possibly denatured with undesirable consequences, such as being ungrounded in the traditional reflective morality and therefore, astray from traditional Buddhist ethics. Criticisms suggest it to be either de-moralized or re-moralized into clinically based ethics. The conflict is often presented with concern to the teacher's credentials and qualifications, rather than the student's actual practice. Reformed Buddhist-influenced practices are being standardized and manualized in a distinct separation from Buddhism - which is seen as a religion based in monastic temples - and expressed as "mindfulness" in a new psychology ethic, practiced in modern meditation centers.

== See also ==
- Affect labeling
- Alexander Technique
- Buddhism and psychology
- Buddhist meditation
- Choiceless awareness
- Coping (psychology)
- Coping Planning
- Eternal Now (New Age)
- Four stages of competence
- Full Catastrophe Living
- John Garrie
- Richard Geller
- S.N. Goenka
- Henepola Gunaratana
- Hasidic Meditation
- Dennis Lewis
- Mahasati Meditation
- Metacognition
- Mindful Education
- Mindful yoga
- Mindfulness (journal)
- Mindfulness and technology
- Mindfulness Day
- Mindstream
- Murder Mindfully
- Nepsis
- No-mind
- Nonviolent communication
- Ovsiankina effect
- Phronesis
- Sacca
- Sakshi (witness)
- Sampajanna
- Samu (Zen)
- Satipatthana
- Satya
- Satyagraha
- Self-compassion
- Taqwa and dhikr, related Islamic concepts
- Thích Nhất Hạnh
- Transcendental Meditation
- Watchfulness (Christian)

== Sources ==
Buddhist

- Analayo, Bhikku (2003). Satipaṭṭhāna, the direct path to realization. Windhorse Publications.
- Bhikkhu Bodhi. "The Noble Eightfold Path". Access to Insight.
- Gunaratana, Bhante (2011). Mindfulness in plain English (PDF). Boston: Wisdom Publications. ISBN 978-0-86171-906-8. Archived from the original (PDF) on 2017-12-15.
- PTS. "Sati". The Pali Text Society's Pali-English Dictionary. Digital Dictionaries of South Asia, University of Chicago. Archived from the original on 2021-04-25.

Research papers

- Alvear, David; Soler, Joaquim; Cebolla, Ausiàs (2022). "Meditators' Non-academic Definition of Mindfulness". Mindfulness. 13 (6): 1544–1554. doi:10.1007/s12671-022-01899-3. PMC 9127491. PMID 35634214.
- Baer, Ruth A. (2003). "Mindfulness Training as a Clinical Intervention: A Conceptual and Empirical Review" (PDF). Clinical Psychology: Science and Practice. 10 (2): 125–143. doi:10.1093/clipsy.bpg015.
- Bigman-Peer, N.; Yovel, I. (2024). "Conceptualizing mindfulness using construal level theory: A two-dimensional model". Mindfulness. 15 (9): 2402–2414. doi:10.1007/s12671-024-02419-7 (inactive July 17, 2026).
- Bishop SR, Lau M, Shapiro S, Carlson L, Anderson ND, Carmody J, Segal ZV, Abbey S, Speca M, Velting D, Devins G (2004). "Mindfulness: A Proposed Operational Definition". Clinical Psychology: Science and Practice. 11 (3): 230–241. CiteSeerX 10.1.1.168.6212. doi:10.1093/clipsy.bph077.
- Black, David S. (2011). "A Brief Definition of Mindfulness" (PDF). Archived from the original (PDF) on 2011-07-27.
- Blanck, P.; Perleth, S; Heidenreich, T; Kröger, P; Ditzen, B.; Bents, H.; Mander, J. (2018). "Effects of mindfulness exercises as stand-alone intervention on symptoms of anxiety and depression: Systematic review and meta-analysis". Behaviour Research and Therapy. 102: 25–35. doi:10.1007/s12671-014-0379-y. PMID 29291584.
- Buchholz, L. (2015). "Exploring the Promise of Mindfulness as Medicine". JAMA. 314 (13): 1327–1329. doi:10.1001/jama.2015.7023. PMID 26441167.
- Calderone, Andrea; Latella, Desirée; Impellizzeri, Federica; de Pasquale, Paolo; Famà, Fausto; Quartarone, Angelo; Calabrò, Rocco Salvatore (2024). "Neurobiological Changes Induced by Mindfulness and Meditation: A Systematic Review". Biomedicines. 12 (11): 2613. doi:10.3390/biomedicines12112613. PMC 11591838. PMID 39595177.
- Chems-Maarif, Ryad; Cavanagh, Kate; Baer, Ruth; Gu, Jenny; Strauss, Clara (2025). "Defining Mindfulness: A Review of Existing Definitions and Suggested Refinements". Mindfulness. 16 (1): 1–20. doi:10.1007/s12671-024-02507-2.
- Chiesa, A; Serretti, A (2014). "Are mindfulness-based interventions effective for substance use disorders? A systematic review of the evidence". Substance Use & Misuse. 49 (5): 492–512. doi:10.3109/10826084.2013.770027. PMID 23461667. S2CID 34990668.
- Creswell, J.D. (January 2017). "Mindfulness Interventions". Annual Review of Psychology. 68: 491–516. doi:10.1146/annurev-psych-042716-051139. PMID 27687118. "Methodologically rigorous RCTs have demonstrated that mindfulness interventions improve outcomes in multiple domains (e.g., chronic pain, depression relapse, addiction)."
- David Creswell, J.; Lindsay, Emily K.; Villalba, Daniella K.; Chin, Brian (2020). "Mindfulness Training and Physical Health: Mechanisms and Outcomes". Psychosomatic Medicine. 81 (3): 224–232. doi:10.1097/PSY.0000000000000675. ISSN 0033-3174. PMC 6613793. PMID 30806634.
- Deatherage, Gary (1975). "The clinical use of "mindfulness" meditation techniques in short-term psychotherapy" (PDF). Journal of Transpersonal Psychology. 7 (2): 133–43.
- Dreyfus G (2013). "Is mindfulness present-centered and non-judgmental? A discussion of the cognitive dimensions of mindfulness". In Williams JM, Kabat-Zinn J (eds.). Mindfulness: Diverse Perspectives on its Meaning, Origins and Applications. Routledge.
- Dunning, DL; Griffiths, K; Kuyken, W; Crane, C; Foulkes, L; Parker, J; Dalgleish, T (2019). "Research Review: The effects of mindfulness-based interventions on cognition and mental health in children and adolescents - a meta-analysis of randomized controlled trials". Journal of Child Psychology and Psychiatry, and Allied Disciplines. 60 (3): 244–258. doi:10.1111/jcpp.12980. PMC 6546608. PMID 30345511.
- Galante, Julieta; Friedrich, Claire; Dawson, Anna F.; Modrego-Alarcón, Marta; Gebbing, Pia; Delgado-Suárez, Irene; Gupta, Radhika; Dean, Lydia; Dalgleish, Tim; White, Ian R.; Jones, Peter B. (2021). "Mindfulness-based programmes for mental health promotion in adults in nonclinical settings: A systematic review and meta-analysis of randomised controlled trials". PLOS Medicine. 18 (1) e1003481. doi:10.1371/journal.pmed.1003481. ISSN 1549-1676. PMC 7799763. PMID 33428616.
- Garland, EL; Froeliger, B; Howard, MO (2014). "Mindfulness training targets neurocognitive mechanisms of addiction at the attention-appraisal-emotion interface". Frontiers in Psychiatry. 4: 173. doi:10.3389/fpsyt.2013.00173. PMC 3887509. PMID 24454293.
- Gkintoni, Evgenia; Vassilopoulos, Stephanos P.; Nikolaou, Georgios (March 3, 2025). "Mindfulness-Based Cognitive Therapy in Clinical Practice: A Systematic Review of Neurocognitive Outcomes and Applications for Mental Health and Well-Being". Journal of Clinical Medicine. 14 (5). MDPI AG: 1703. doi:10.3390/jcm14051703. ISSN 2077-0383. PMC 11900371. PMID 40095733.
- Goldberg, Simon B.; Riordan, Kevin M.; Sun, Shufang; Davidson, Richard J. (2022). "The Empirical Status of Mindfulness-Based Interventions: A Systematic Review of 44 Meta-Analyses of Randomized Controlled Trials". Perspectives on Psychological Science. 17 (1): 108–130. doi:10.1177/1745691620968771. PMC 8364929. PMID 33593124.
- Gomutbutra, Patama; Yingchankul, Nalinee; Chattipakorn, Nipon; Chattipakorn, Siriporn; Srisurapanont, Manit (2020). "The Effect of Mindfulness-Based Intervention on Brain-Derived Neurotrophic Factor (BDNF): A Systematic Review and Meta-Analysis of Controlled Trials". Frontiers in Psychology. 11 2209. doi:10.3389/fpsyg.2020.02209. PMC 7522212. PMID 33041891.
- Gong, Xiao-Gang; Wang, Le-Peng; Rong, Guang; Zhang, Dao-Ning; Zhang, A-Yuan; Liu, Chao (2023). "Effects of online mindfulness-based interventions on the mental health of university students: A systematic review and meta-analysis". Frontiers in Psychology. 14 1073647. doi:10.3389/fpsyg.2023.1073647. PMC 9944037. PMID 36844353.
- Harrington, A; Dunne, JD (2015). "When mindfulness is therapy: Ethical qualms, historical perspectives". The American Psychologist. 70 (7): 621–631. doi:10.1037/a0039460. PMID 26436312. S2CID 43129186.
- Hayes, A.M. (2004). "Clarifying the Construct of Mindfulness in the Context of Emotion Regulation and the Process of Change in Therapy". Clinical Psychology: Science and Practice. 11 (3): 255–62. CiteSeerX 10.1.1.168.5070. doi:10.1093/clipsy/bph080.
- Hofmann SG, Sawyer AT, Witt AA, Oh D (April 2010). "The effect of mindfulness-based therapy on anxiety and depression: A meta-analytic review". Journal of Consulting and Clinical Psychology. 78 (2): 169–183. doi:10.1037/a0018555. PMC 2848393. PMID 20350028.
- Jain, FA; Walsh, RN; Eisendrath, SJ; Christensen, S; Rael Cahn, B (2015). "Critical analysis of the efficacy of meditation therapies for acute and subacute phase treatment of depressive disorders: a systematic review". Psychosomatics. 56 (2): 140–152. doi:10.1016/j.psym.2014.10.007. PMC 4383597. PMID 25591492.
- Jong, Freda Jia Xin; Ng, Alvin Lai Oon; Phang, Cheng Kar; Omran, Safa; Teoh, Siew Li (2025). "The Effects of Mindfulness-Based Intervention on Cognitive Functions in Tertiary Students: A Systematic Review and Meta-Analysis". Applied Cognitive Psychology. 39 (3) e70056. doi:10.1002/acp.70056. ISSN 0888-4080.
- Kabat-Zinn J (July 2000). "Participatory medicine". Journal of the European Academy of Dermatology and Venereology. 14 (4): 239–240. doi:10.1046/j.1468-3083.2000.00062.x. PMID 11204505. S2CID 35760167.
- Karunamuni N, Weerasekera R (2019). "Theoretical Foundations to Guide Mindfulness Meditation: A Path to Wisdom". Current Psychology. 38 (3): 627–646. doi:10.1007/s12144-017-9631-7. S2CID 149024504.
- Karunamuni, N; Wood, T; Galante, J (2025). "Exploring the mind-brain relationship to advance mental health research and practice". Current Psychology. 44 (24): 19088–19108. doi:10.1007/s12144-025-08345-2.
- Keng, SL; Smoski, MJ; Robins, CJ (2011). "Effects of mindfulness on psychological health: a review of empirical studies". Clinical Psychology Review. 31 (6): 1041–1056. doi:10.1016/j.cpr.2011.04.006. PMC 3679190. PMID 21802619.
- Khoury, B; Sharma, M; Rush, SE; Fournier, C (2015). "Mindfulness-based stress reduction for healthy individuals: A meta-analysis". Journal of Psychosomatic Research. 78 (6): 519–528. doi:10.1016/j.jpsychores.2015.03.009. PMID 25818837.
- Kvamme, Timo L.; Sandberg, Kristian; Silvanto, Juha (2024). "Mental imagery as part of an 'inwardly focused' cognitive style". Neuropsychologia. 204 108988. doi:10.1016/j.neuropsychologia.2024.108988. PMID 39222775.
- Matiz, Alessio (January 30, 2025). "Psychological and neuroscientific correlates of mindfulness in clinical and educational settings" (in Italian). Università degli Studi di Roma "La Sapienza'.
- Nisbet, Matthew (2017). "The Mindfulness Movement: How a Buddhist Practice Evolved into a Scientific Approach to Life". Skeptical Inquirer. 41 (3): 24–26. Archived from the original on 2018-10-02.
- Noetel M, Ciarrochi J, Van Zanden B, Lonsdale C (2019). "Mindfulness and acceptance approaches to sporting performance enhancement: a systematic review". International Review of Sport and Exercise Psychology. 12 (1): 139–175. doi:10.1080/1750984X.2017.1387803. S2CID 149040404.
- Pascoe, MC; Thompson, DR; Jenkins, ZM; Ski, CF (2017). "Mindfulness mediates the physiological markers of stress: Systematic review and meta-analysis". Journal of Psychiatric Research. 95: 156–178. doi:10.1016/j.jpsychires.2017.08.004. PMID 28863392.
- Paulus, MP (2016). "Neural Basis of Mindfulness Interventions that Moderate the Impact of Stress on the Brain". Neuropsychopharmacology. 41 (1): 373. doi:10.1038/npp.2015.239. PMC 4677133. PMID 26657952.
- Purser, R. E.; Milillo, J. (2015). "Mindfulness revisited: A Buddhist-based conceptualization". Journal of Management Inquiry. 24 (1): 3–24. doi:10.1177/1056492614532315.
- Rajan, Anisha; Kumar, Mahendra; Raj, Pranav (February 3, 2026). "Effects of mindfulness-based interventions on perceived stress among non-clinical adults: a systematic review and meta-analysis". npj Mental Health Research. 5 (1) 9. doi:10.1038/s44184-026-00188-4. PMC 12868674. PMID 41634335.
- Sancho, M; De Gracia, M; Rodríguez, RC; et al. (2018). "Mindfulness-Based Interventions for the Treatment of Substance and Behavioral Addictions: A Systematic Review". Frontiers in Psychiatry. 9 (95): 95. doi:10.3389/fpsyt.2018.00095. PMC 5884944. PMID 29651257.
- Sharf R (1995). "Buddhist Modernism and the Rhetoric of Meditative Experience" (PDF). Numen. 42 (3): 228–283. doi:10.1163/1568527952598549. hdl:2027.42/43810. JSTOR 3270219.
- Sharf R (2014). "Mindfulness and Mindlessness in Early Chan". Philosophy East and West. 64 (4): 933–64. doi:10.1353/pew.2014.0074. S2CID 144208166.
- Shonin, E.; Van Gordon, W. (2013). "Searching for the present moment". Mindfulness. 5 (1): 105–107. doi:10.1007/s12671-013-0248-0.
- Slagter, H.A.; Davidson, R.J.; Lutz, A. (2011). "Mental training as a tool in the neuroscientific study of brain and cognitive plasticity". Frontiers in Human Neuroscience. 5: 17. doi:10.3389/fnhum.2011.00017. PMC 3039118. PMID 21347275.
- Tanay G, Bernstein A (December 2013). "State Mindfulness Scale (SMS): development and initial validation". Psychological Assessment. 25 (4): 1286–1299. doi:10.1037/a0034044. PMID 24059475. S2CID 8659383.
- Temgoua Ngou, M.; Endomba, F.T.; Berenfeld, C.; Berenfeld, A.; Bloch, J.G. (2026). "Effect of mindfulness-based stress reduction (MBSR) on cardiometabolic health: A systematic review and meta-analysis". Archives of Cardiovascular Diseases. 119 (1): S139. doi:10.1016/j.acvd.2025.10.246.
- Tong, MengJie; Qiu, YuFei; Liu, JiaLi; Yue, YaKe; Gu, Juan; Zeng, LiJuan; Yu, YiQing; Yang, Fen (2026). "Effectiveness of online mindfulness-based interventions based on the structured curriculum framework in improving mental health: A meta-analysis of randomized controlled trials". General Hospital Psychiatry. 100: 163–174. doi:10.1016/j.genhosppsych.2026.03.022. PMID 41932064.
- Valerio, Adam (2016). "Owning Mindfulness: A Bibliometric Analysis of Mindfulness Literature Trends Within and Outside of Buddhist Contexts". Contemporary Buddhism. 17: 157–83. doi:10.1080/14639947.2016.1162425. S2CID 148411457.
- Van Gordon, William; Shonin, Edo; Griffiths, Mark D; Singh, Nirbhay N. (2014). "There is Only One Mindfulness: Why Science and Buddhism Need to Work Together". Mindfulness. 6: 49–56. doi:10.1007/s12671-014-0379-y.
- Wang, Y.; Lei, S.M.; Fan, J. (2023). "Effects of Mindfulness-Based Interventions on Promoting Athletic Performance and Related Factors among Athletes: A Systematic Review and Meta-Analysis of Randomized Controlled Trial". International Journal of Environmental Research and Public Health. 20 (3): 2038. Bibcode:2023IJERP..20.2038W. doi:10.3390/ijerph20032038. PMC 9915077. PMID 36767403.
- Weder, Bruno J. (2022). "Mindfulness in the focus of the neurosciences - The contribution of neuroimaging to the understanding of mindfulness". Frontiers in Behavioral Neuroscience. 16 928522. doi:10.3389/fnbeh.2022.928522. ISSN 1662-5153. PMC 9622333. PMID 36325155.
- Wilks, Jenny (2014). "Secular mindfulness: potential & pitfalls". Insight Journal.
- Zgierska A, Rabago D, Chawla N, Kushner K, Koehler R, Marlatt A (2009). "Mindfulness meditation for substance use disorders: a systematic review". Substance Abuse. 30 (4): 266–294. Bibcode:2009JPkR...30..266Z. doi:10.1080/08897070903250019. PMC 2800788. PMID 19904664.
- Zhang, Dexing; Lee, Eric K P; Mak, Eva C W; Ho, C Y; Wong, Samuel Y S (2021). "Mindfulness-based interventions: an overall review". British Medical Bulletin. 138 (1): 41–57. doi:10.1093/bmb/ldab005. PMC 8083197. PMID 33884400.

Book-chapters

- Germer CK (2005). "Mindfulness. What Is It? What does It Matter?". In Germer CK, Siegel RD, Fulton PR (eds.). Mindfulness and Psychotherapy. Guilford Press.
- Heyward, Carolyn (2025). "The History and Theoretical Framework of Mindfulness-Based Stress Reduction (MBSR)". In Wen Li, Wendy; Griffith, Gemma M.; Shapiro, Shauna; Zhu, Zhuohong (eds.). The Palgrave Handbook of Third-Wave Psychotherapies. Palgrave MacMillan.
- Hick SF (2010). "Cultivating Therapeutic Relationships: The Role of Mindfulness.". In Hick SF, Bien T (eds.). Mindfulness and the Therapeutic Relationship. Guilford Press.

Scholarly books

- Bazzano M (2014). After Mindfulness: New Perspectives on Psychology and Meditation. Palgrave Macmillan.
- Didonna F (2008). Clinical Handbook of Mindfulness. Springer Science & Business Media.
- Gehart DR (2012). Mindfulness and Acceptance in Couple and Family Therapy. Springer Science & Business Media.
- Harris MW (2009). The A to Z of Unitarian Universalism. Bloomsbury Publishing. ISBN 978-0-8108-6333-0.
- King R (2001). Orientalism and Religion: Post-Colonial Theory, India and "The Mystic East". Taylor & Francis e-Library.
- Kipf D (1979). The Brahmo Samaj and the shaping of the modern Indian mind. Atlantic Publishers & Distri. ISBN 978-0-691-03125-5.
- Kristeller JL (2007). "Mindfulness Meditation". In Lehrer PM, Woolfolk RL, Sime WE (eds.). Principles and Practice of Stress Management (3rd ed.). Guilford Press.
- Lee MJ (2020). Moral Transformation in Greco-Roman Philosophy of Mind: Mapping the Moral Milieu of the Apostle Paul and his Diaspora Jewish Contemporaries. Mohr Siebeck. ISBN 978-3-1614-9660-8.
- Linehan M (1993). Cognitive-Behavioral Treatment of Borderline Personality Disorder. Guilford Press.
- Marlatt GA, Kristeller J (1999). "Mindfulness and meditation". In Miller WE (ed.). Integrating spirituality in treatment: Resources for practitioners. Washington, DC: American Psychological Association Books. pp. 67–84.
- McMahan DL (2008). The Making of Buddhist Modernism. Oxford University Press. ISBN 978-0-19-518327-6.
- Polak G (2011). Reexamining Jhana: Towards a Critical Reconstruction of Early Buddhist Soteriology. UMCS.
- Purser, Ronald (2019a). McMindfulness: How Mindfulness Became the New Capitalist Spirituality. Watkins Media Limited. ISBN 978-1-912248-49-0.
- Repetti R (2022). Routledge Handbook on the Philosophy of Meditation. Routledge. ISBN 978-1-0005-7574-3.
- Williams, Mark; Teasdale, John; Segal, Zindel; Kabat-Zinn, Jon (2007). The Mindful Way Through Depression: Freeing Yourself from Chronic Unhappiness. Guilford Press.
- Thompson, Evan (2020). Why I Am Not a Buddhist. New Haven and London: Yale University Press. p. 120. ISBN 978-0-300-22655-3. "Buddhism has no single, agreed-upon traditional definition of mindfulness. Rather, Buddhism offers multiple and sometimes incompatible conceptions of mindfulness."
- Vetter, Tilmann (1988). The Ideas and Meditative Practices of Early Buddhism. BRILL.
- Williams P, Tribe A (2000). Buddhist Thought. Routledge.
- Wilson J (2014). Mindful America: the Mutual Transformation of Buddhist Meditation and American Culture. Oxford University Press.

Popular

- Ihnen A, Flynn C (2008). The Complete Idiot's Guide to Mindfulness. Penguin.
- Kabat-Zinn, Jon (2011). Mindfulness for Beginners: Reclaiming the Present Moment--and Your Life. Sounds True.
- Kabat-Zinn, J. (2013). Full Catastrophe Living: Using the Wisdom of Your Body and Mind to Face Stress, Pain, and Illness. New York: Bantam Dell. ISBN 978-0-345-53972-4.
- Kabat-Zinn, Jon (2013a). Arriving at Your Own Door: 108 Lessons in Mindfulness. Hyperion. ISBN 978-1-306-75229-9.
- Siegel, Ronald D. (2010). The Mindfulness Solution: Everyday Practices for Everyday Problems. The Guilford Press. ISBN 978-1-60623-294-1

News

- Hurley, Dan (2014). "Breathing In vs. Spacing Out". New York Times Magazine.

Web sources
