= Mode deactivation therapy =

Psychotherapy approach

Mode deactivation therapy (MDT) is a psychotherapeutic approach that addresses dysfunctional emotions, maladaptive behaviors and cognitive processes and contents through a number of goal-oriented, explicit systematic procedures. The name refers to the process of mode deactivation that is based on the concept of cognitive modes as introduced by Aaron T. Beck. The MDT methodology was developed by Jack A. Apsche by combining the unique validation–clarification–redirection process step with elements from acceptance and commitment therapy, dialectical behavior therapy, and mindfulness to bring about durable behavior change.

== Theory ==
Mode deactivation therapy (MDT) was developed by Jack A. Apsche who recognized shortcomings of cognitive theory and cognitive-behavioral therapies, especially for the treatment of populations with complex psychological problems. Cognitive behavioral therapy (CBT) was primarily conceptualized through an integration of behavior therapy with cognitive psychology that were formulated by Aaron T. Beck. As such, the CBT approaches focus primarily on the present rather than the past, behavioral change as the main goal, and current processes that are maintaining the problem rather than the root causes. Traditionally CBT views problem manifestation as brought about by dysfunctional thinking, which is disputed as irrational beliefs and replaced with the use of logical arguments.

Eventually some practitioners realized that in some cases dysfunctional cognitions should not be disputed. As a result, a new wave of cognitive-behavioral therapies began to form, which was termed the "third wave" by Steven C. Hayes, who went on to develop Relational frame theory and Acceptance and commitment therapy. (Behaviour therapy was the first wave and Cognitive therapy was the second.) Jack A. Apsche agreed in general with this principle, but also believed that there is value in exploring the origins of maladaptive thought processes in addition to validating their existence as reasonable given an individual's past experiences upon which his or her core beliefs are based.

Aaron T. Beck asserted that how people feel and behave are largely determined by their thought processes or cognitions, which may make us vulnerable to psychological distress. These vulnerabilities are related to personality structures—a person's fundamental beliefs about themselves and the world around them. Personality structures largely develop as a result of responding to environmental stimuli and experiences. When these are distressing and deprive a person of psychological needs, the coping mechanism may be viewed as maladaptive compared with normal circumstances. The personality structures are referred to as cognitive schemas, which—in combinations—inform a person how to behave in a certain situation. Cognitive schemas are often automatically activated and group together to form cognitive modes that are deep-seated and durable behavioral manifestations such as depression and aggression.

In MDT these modes and their associated core beliefs are validated and normalized in the client's perspective by cultivating awareness and acceptance rather than disputing any belief as irrational or "bad". The proposition is that awareness and acceptance improves the therapist-client bond, client cooperation, commitment and motivation, which enables an effective and durable therapeutic change process.

== Practice ==
The application of MDT integrates the validation–clarification–redirection process step with selected elements from Acceptance and commitment therapy, Dialectical behavior therapy, and mindfulness (psychology) through a systematic and collaborative case conceptualization and implementation process.

=== Assessment ===
The case conceptualization forms the blueprint of the MDT planning and implementation process, and is based on a systematic assessment procedure that is aimed at identifying, clarifying, and formulating the core beliefs → fears → thoughts and feelings → behavior sequence. First, a semi-structured clinical interview is conducted to form the foundation of further psychometric testing. The client typology survey is completed by the therapist with inputs from the client, parent/guardian, family members, and other records, including arrest and medical where relevant. It includes family information, substance abuse, medical, neglect, physical and sexual abuse and offending history, educational, emotional, behavioral, physiological, and interpersonal information. The expectations of treatment and willingness to cooperate are also noted.

Second, the Strength of Fears Questionnaire is completed and scored. The 60-item 4-point Likert scale responses is scored to examine five sub-categories of fear, namely personal reactive-external, personal reactive-internal/self-concept, environmental, physical, and abuse. The test is sensitive to the detection of trauma and identifies and rates specific fear and associated situations. Life-interfering fears are also identified.

Then, the client completes the Compound Core Beliefs Questionnaire (CCBQ), a 96-item 4-point Likert scale form (short version). The score primarily informs the therapist of the client's personality traits and structure, as well as potential life-threatening and treatment-interfering beliefs. Hereby, the CCBQ helps identify the client's underlying beliefs and thoughts that guide his or her behavior. Each belief is clarified and completed with examples.

=== Case conceptualization ===
The results and analyses of the client typology, Fear Assessment and Compound Core Beliefs Questionnaire are used to compile the Triggers, Fears, Avoids, and Compound Core Beliefs Correlation (TFAB) and the Conglomerate of Beliefs and Behaviors (COBB) worksheets. A situational analysis associate the problem beliefs, fears, and behaviors with triggers to identify the mode activation processes that have to be deactivated. The collaborative case conceptualization process is completed with the Functional Treatment Development Form, which informs and monitors the treatment planning and progress.

The TFAB form is used to link specific triggers with fears and core beliefs, while the COBB takes the process one step further by associating each core belief with a specific behavior. Now functional alternative beliefs, healthy alternative thoughts and compensatory strategies are identified, which is developed and reinforced through the validation–clarification–redirection process.

=== Validation–clarification–redirection ===
The validation–clarification–redirection of the functional alternative belief is what separates MDT from other CBT-based approaches. In validation, the therapist explores the grain of truth in the client's perceptions or beliefs and views them as reasonable responses given his or her life experiences. In clarification, the content of the client's responses is elucidated while awareness and acceptance is encouraged. In redirection, the therapist moves the client towards accepting a functional alternative belief through commitment and motivation to work towards positive alternatives that are more supportive of his or her life goals and aspirations.

=== Mindfulness ===
Mindfulness is defined as a mental state achieved by focusing one's awareness on the present moment, while calmly acknowledging and accepting one's feelings, thoughts, and bodily sensations. It is helpful to cultivate awareness and acceptance of distressful thoughts and feelings in the present, a state that is necessary to be able to consciously affect change in one's condition. MDT utilizes this perspective to normalize the client's thoughts and feelings, while developing healthier functional alternative beliefs. Remember that problem thoughts, feelings, and behaviors are the products of dysfunctional core beliefs that are often cultivated by distressful events.

== Applications ==
MDT was specifically developed as a psychotherapy protocol for adolescents with complex problems such as conduct, mood, and mixed personality disorders that are co-existing with trauma-related and substance abuse issues, aggression. This type of psychopathology constellation is typically associated with childhood abuse and neglect.

The MDT methodology was proved effective to treat adolescent populations aged 14- to 18-years with a variety of problems. These include Conduct disorder, Oppositional defiant disorder, Substance use disorder, mixed multiple Personality disorder, Posttraumatic stress disorder, Mood disorder, Aggression, Sexual offending, and Child abuse. In addition to this complex population, other conditions that are often considered as difficult-to-treat also had effective outcomes compared to traditional CBT approaches. These include aggressive narcissistic, antisocial, and psychopathic youth. Although the research studies to date have not included adults or adolescent females, there are no apparent reason why the MDT treatment approach would not be equally effective for these populations.

MDT is also applied in a family context. In fact, involving the family in the MDT treatment process has proven to be beneficial to improve collaboration, treatment outcome, and durability of changes. MDT has been applied in outpatient and institutional settings.

== Evaluation of effectiveness ==
To date, there has been 10 separate MDT research studies. Results of a meta-analysis suggest that there is a large effect size for both family-based and individual Mode Deactivation Therapy (MDT). There was a significant reduction of all negative behaviors from intake to post-treatment and beyond as measured by the Child Behavior Checklist (CBCL) and State-Trait Anxiety Inventory (STAXI-II). Conventional treatments for the same populations produced insignificant change. Applying MDT, the CBCL internalizing and externalizing scales declined by an average of about 35% and the STAXI total anger expression decreased by a similar margin (37%). Comparative improvements with treatment as usual were consistently around 5%.

== Criticisms ==
In a review of the 2010-book, Nancy Calleja remarked that MDT also incorporated a psychodynamic element by exploring early childhood experiences and deterministic behaviors. "Whereas some believe that this type of theoretical eclecticism is precisely what is needed to treat complex issues, others may have difficulty finding coherence in this type of model." (p. 136). Furthermore, as an approach that is claimed to be evidence-based, research that supports the conceptual model remains fairly limited, especially independent studies.

== Publications ==
The current list of peer-reviewed professional publications that cover the theory and research of MDT are listed below in categorized format.

=== Quantitative MDT studies ===
- Bass, C. K., & Apsche, J. A. (2013). Mediation analysis of Mode Deactivation Therapy: Reanalysis and interpretation. International Journal of Behavioral Consultation and Therapy, 8(2), 1–6.
- Apsche, J. A., Bass, C. K., & Siv, A. M. (2006b). Summary of Mode Deactivation Therapy, Cognitive Behavior Therapy and Social Skills Training with two year post treatment results. International Journal of Consultation and Therapy, 2(1), 9-44.
- Apsche, J. A., Bass, C. K., Zeiter, J. S., & Houston, M. A. (2009). Family Mode Deactivation Therapy in a residential setting: Treating adolescents with Conduct Disorder and multi-axial diagnosis. International Journal of Behavioral Consultation and Therapy, 4(4), 328–339.
- Apsche, J. A., Bass, C. K., Jennings, J. L., Murphy, C. J., Hunter, L. A., & Siv, A. M. (2005). Empirical comparison of three treatments of adolescent males with physical and sexual aggression: Mode Deactivation Therapy, Cognitive Behavioral Therapy, and Social Skills Training. International Journal of Behavioral Consultation and Therapy, 1(2), 101–113.
- Apsche, J. A., Bass, C. K., & Murphy, C. J. (2004). A comparison of two treatment studies: CBT and MDT with adolescent male sex offenders with reactive Conduct Disorder and/or personality traits. Journal of Early and Intensive Behavior Intervention, 1(2), 179–190.
- Apsche, J. A., Bass, C. K., & Siv, A. M. (2006a). A treatment study of a suicidal adolescent with personality disorder or traits: Mode Deactivation Therapy compared to treatment as usual. The International Journal of Behavioral Consultation and Therapy, 2(2), 215–223.
- Apsche, J. A., Bass, C. K., & Backlund, B. (2012). Mediation analysis of Mode Deactivation Therapy (MDT). The Behavior Analyst Today, 13(2), 2–10.

=== Qualitative MDT studies ===
- Apsche, J. A., Ward, S. R., Evile, M. M. (2003). Mode Deactivation Therapy (MDT): Case conceptualization. The Behavior Analyst Today, 4(1), 47–58.
- Apsche, J. A., & Ward Bailey, S. R. (2004). Mode Deactivation Therapy (MDT) family therapy: A theoretical case analysis. Journal of Early and Intensive Behavior Intervention, 1(2), 191–217.
- Apsche, J. A., & Ward Bailey, S. R. (2003). Mode Deactivation Therapy: A theoretical case analysis (Part I). The Behavior Analyst Today, 4(3), 342–353.
- Apsche, J. A., Bass, C. K., & Houston, M. A. (2008). Family Mode Deactivation Therapy as a manualized Cognitive Behavioral Therapy treatment. International Journal of Behavioral Consultation and Therapy, 4(2), 264–277.
- Apsche, J. A., & Bass, C. K. (2006). Family Mode Deactivation Therapy results and implications. International Journal of Behavioral Consultation and Therapy, 2(3), 375–381.
- Apsche, J. A. (2010). A literature review and analysis of Mode Deactivation Therapy. International Journal of Behavioral Consultation and Therapy, 6(4), 296–340.

=== Family-based MDT studies ===
- Apsche, J. A., & Bass, C. K. (2006). Family Mode Deactivation Therapy results and implications. International Journal of Behavioral Consultation and Therapy, 2(3), 375–381.
- Apsche, J. A., Bass, C. K., & Houston, M. A. (2007). Family Mode Deactivation Therapy as a manualized Cognitive Behavioral Therapy treatment. Behavior Analyst Today, 8(3), 363–378.
- Apsche, J. A., Bass, C. K., & Houston, M. (2008). Family Mode Deactivation Therapy as a manualized Cognitive Behavioral Therapy treatment. International Journal of Behavioral Consultation and Therapy, 4(2), 264–277.
- Apsche, J. A., Bass, C. K., & Houston, M. A. (2007). Family MDT vs. Treatment as Usual in a community setting. International Journal of Behavior Consultation and Therapy, 3(1), 145–153.
- Apsche, J. A., Bass, C. K., Zeiter, J. S., & Houston, M. A. (2009). Family Mode Deactivation Therapy in a residential Setting: Treating adolescents with Conduct Disorder and multi-axial diagnosis. International Journal of Behavior Consultation Therapy, 4(4), 328–329.
- Apsche, J. A., & Ward Bailey, S. R. (2004). Mode Deactivation Therapy (MDT) family therapy: A theoretical case analysis. The Journal of Early and Intensive Behavior Intervention, 1(2), 191–217.

=== Independent MDT studies ===
- Thoder, V. J., & Cautilli, J. D. (2011). An independent evaluation of Mode Deactivation Therapy for juvenile offenders. International Journal of Behavioral Consultation and Therapy, 7(1), 41–46.
- Murphy, C. J., & Siv, A. M. (2011). A one-year study of Mode Deactivation Therapy: Adolescent residential patients with conduct and personality disorders. International Journal of Behavioral Consultation and Therapy, 7(1), 33–40.

=== Meta-analyses ===
- Apsche, J. A., Bass, C., & DiMeo, L. (2010). Mode Deactivation Therapy (MDT) comprehensive meta-analysis. The Journal of Behavior Analysis of Offender and Victim Treatment and Prevention, 2(3), 171–182.
- Apsche, J. A., Bass, C., & DiMeo, L. (2011). Mode Deactivation Therapy (MDT) comprehensive meta-analysis. International Journal of Behavioral Consultation and Therapy, 7(1), 47–54.

=== Books ===
- Apsche, J. A., & DiMeo, L. (2010). Mode Deactivation Therapy for aggression and oppositional behavior in adolescents: An integrative methodology using ACT, DBT, and CBT. Oakland, CA: New Harbinger.

== See also ==
- Jack A. Apsche
- Joan Swart
