= Teean Cittasubho =

Thai reformist Buddhist monk

Personal life
- Born: 5 September 1911; 114 years ago
- Died: 13 September 1988 (aged 77)

Religious life
- Religion: Buddhism

The venerable Cittasubho (𑀘𑀺𑀢𑁆𑀢𑀲𑀼𑀪; lay name: Pann Intapew; 5 September 1911 – 13 September 1988), popularly known as Luang Por Teean, was a Thai reformist Buddhist monk. Cittasubho was the progenitor of mahāsati practice of meditation, which employs movement of the body to generate self-awareness.

== Biography ==
On September 5, 1911 (114 years ago), Cittasubho was born as Pann Intapew at Buhom, Amphur Chiengkhan in the northeastern province of Loei, in Thailand. His father died when he was young. Luangpor Teean did not have formal education in his childhood. The boy, like the rest of them in the village, had to help his mother in running their farm.

In 1921, at the age of 11, Cittasubho was ordained as a novice at the village monastery, and stayed there with his uncle who was a resident monk. During a year and six months in the monastery, he studied Laotian scripts and ancient local scripts. He also started practicing various meditation methods, such as the “Budhdho”-ānāpānassati and breath-counting methods. After disrobing, he returned to his home.

In 1930, at the age of 20, following tradition, Cittasubho was ordained as a monk. Again he studied and practiced meditation with his uncle for six months. After returning to lay life, he was married at the age of 22 and had three sons. In his village, he was always a leader in Buddhist activities and was highly respected and chosen to be the head of the village on three different occasions. Despite having heavy responsibilities, he continued his meditation practice regularly.

Later, Cittasubho moved to Chiengkhan, a larger community, where his sons could attend school. Being a merchant, he sailed his steamboat along the Maekhong River between Chiengkhan-Nongkai-Vientiane, or even as far as Luangprabang. He had opportunities to meet several meditation masters and his enthusiasm in pursuing Dhamma (the Truth) continued to strengthen. Furthermore, he began to realize that many years of being good, making merit, and practicing various methods of meditation had not liberated him from his anger. Finally, he determined to start searching for the way out.

In 1957, when he was nearly 46 years old, Cittasubho left his home with firm determination not to return unless he found the Truth. He went to Wat Rangsimukdaram, Tambol Pannprao, Amphur Tabon in Nongkai Province and practiced a simple form of bodily movements, but he did not follow the recitation of the words "ting-ning" (moving-stopping) like others did. What he did instead was focusing awareness on the movements of the body and mind. Within a couple of days, his mind reached the End of Suffering completely without traditional rituals or teachers.

Later, Cittasubho returned home. He taught his wife and relatives what he had found for two years and eight months, as a lay teacher.

On February 3, 1960, at the age of 48, having decided to re-enter monkhood in order to be in a better position to teach the people, Cittasubho accepted formal ordination, becoming known as Luangpor Teean.

After realizing Dhamma, Luangpor Teean traveled around Thailand. Wherever he went to he taught the true messages of the Dhamma. He also established several meditations centers throughout Thailand. Wat Sanamnai is one of his meditation centers. Even though this temple is located on the outskirts of Bangkok, it maintains all the characteristics and formality of the Thai forest tradition.

In 1982, Luangpor Teean was diagnosed with stomach cancer (malignant lymphoma).

In 1985, when Luangpor Teean was 74 years old, Wat Sanamnai Monastery was formally permitted a temple. Luangpor Teean held a Sangkha meeting with all the monks who studied the Mahasati Meditation method and appointed Luangpor Thong the abbot of Wat Sanamnai.

Luangpor Teean's teachings were spreading across the country as well as outside. He devoted his life to the teaching of Dhamma despite his poor health. In spite of his illness he continued his work actively and incisively until the end of his life.

On September 13, 1988, at the age of 77, just over a week after his birthday, Luangpor Teean died in a hut on Koh Buddhadhamma, Tabb Ming Kwan, Tambol Gudpong in Loei Province.

In 1989, shortly after Luangpor Teean's death, "Luangpor Teean Jittasubho (Pann Intapew) Foundation" was founded.

== Mahāsati meditation ==
Mahasati Meditation is a meditation technique concerned about how to end suffering. The Buddha taught that each of us could come to the very important point of the cessation of suffering. Mahasati Meditation is a simple and direct method of practice developed by Luangpor Teean Cittasubho, an important teacher in the world of Thai Buddhism.

Many teachers, mostly from the East, provide many different forms of meditation. Some teachers use breath-counting and breath-concentration. Others teach concentration on a mantra or a koan. Some tell their students to visualize a religious image or some form of light or color. These methods all share the same central theme - the concentration of the mind.

Luangpor Teean taught that meditation is the art of seeing things as they are with awareness and wisdom. Usually we see the world and everything around us through the filter of our concepts or thoughts and through our mental images which we have collected in our daily life since childhood. Thus, these thoughts are both the source of human activity and human suffering. Thought is, for Luangpor Teean, the source of greed, anger, and delusion.

Luangpor Teean said that we cannot simply suppress greed, anger, and delusion by keeping moral precepts, nor can we suppress them by maintaining calmness through some form of meditation based on concentration. Although these activities are useful to some extent, we need to go to the root of suffering: to let awareness see through and break through. When we see things as they are, the mind changes its qualities completely. At the very moment of awareness, the mind immediately becomes active, clear, and pure. With this active, clear, and pure mind we will realize the law of nature and the freedom of life. We will then be free from suffering.

Mahasati Meditation is a form of moving meditation. In Mahasati Meditation the practitioner moves rhythmically with their awareness open to the movement of body and mind. The movements are simple and repetitious, yet Mahasati Meditation is a powerful, deep, and advanced method for self-realization.

The aim of Mahasati Meditation is to attain direct insight into one's self-freedom from pain and suffering, and to attain a healthy mind, one that is stable and wise. This healthy mind benefits not only the practitioner, but is also a beneficial influence on the practitioner's surroundings, including those who are close to him or herself, and to society in general.

=== Rhythmic movements ===
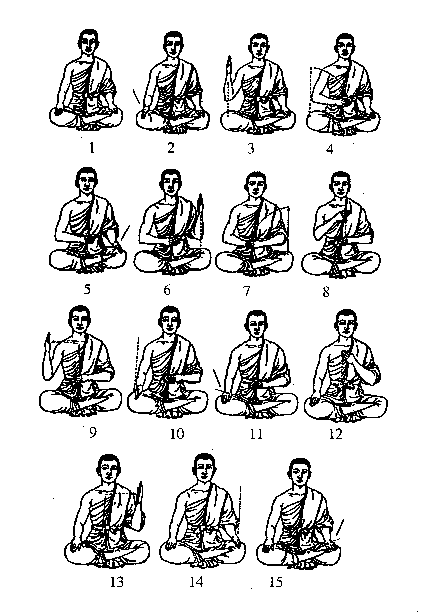
Mahasati Meditation Basic Rhythmic Movements

1. Rest the hands palm down on the thighs.
2. Turn the right hand onto its edge, be aware; do it slowly, then stop. Do not say to yourself "turn the right hand", being aware is enough.
3. Raise the right hand up, be aware, and then stop.
4. Lower the right hand to rest on the abdomen, be aware, and then stop.
5. Turn the left hand onto its edge, be aware, and then stop.
6. Raise the left hand up, be aware, and then stop.
7. Lower the left hand to rest on the right hand, be aware, and then stop.
8. Move the right hand up to rest on the chest, be aware, and then stop.
9. Move the right hand out, be aware, and then stop.
10. Lower the right hand onto its edge on the thigh, be aware, then stop.
11. Face the right palm down, be aware, and then stop.
12. Move the left hand up to rest on the chest, be aware, and then stop.
13. Move the left hand out, be aware, and then stop.
14. Lower the left hand onto its edge on the thigh, be aware, and then stop.
15. Face the left palm down, be aware, and then stop.

=== Four basic positions to meditate ===
Mahasati Meditation can be practiced in four basic positions: sitting; lying; standing; walking.

After sitting for a long time, which can cause pains and aches, practitioners may change the position to the walking back and forth. After walking for a long time, they can change to the sitting posture. This is called changing the positions: sitting; lying; standing; walking. Practitioners should allot them properly.

Practitioners do not move the arms while walking. Practitioners should fold the arms across the chest, or clasp the hands behind the back.

While walking back and forth, practitioners should be aware of the feeling or the feet. It is not necessary to say to themselves, "right foot moves", "left foot moves". Practitioners should not walk too fast or too slow, they have to walk naturally.

=== Self-awareness in daily life ===
To cultivate self-awareness, practitioners must practice as much as possible. Practitioners can practice even when in a car or on a bus.

While sitting on a bus or in a car, practitioners lay their hand on the thigh and turn the palm up and down, or they run the thumb over the fingertip, or they make a fist and open it repeatedly. The key is to do every movement slowly and be aware.

According to Mahasati Meditation, this is the natural way of cultivating self-awareness, learning Dhamma with nature.

=== Living teachers ===
- Luangpor Thong Abhakaro
- Achan K. Khemananda
- Loo-ang por Kamkee-an
- Bhikkhu Nirodho

== Quotes ==
=== The rat (thought) is bigger and stronger than the kitten (awareness) ===
"Generally, when thought arises, the mind will be dragged along like a kitten trying to catch a big rat. The rat (thought) is bigger and stronger than the kitten (awareness). When the rat shows up, the kitten, by nature, will catch the rat. The rat is frightened and runs away with the kitten holding on. After a while the kitten becomes tired and let the rat go. Similarly, thoughts will arise endlessly and stop by themselves.

As we cultivate self-awareness more and more, it is like we keep feeding a kitten until it becomes a big, strong cat. When thought arises, the mind will not be dragged along and thought will stop immediately."

Luangpor Teean Jittasubho

=== One is one's own shelter ===
"You should not believe what I have said, but prove it for yourself. If anyone just believes me, that's wrong. Change your mind - don't just believe. Prove it with yourself and thoroughly understand it - then believe. Otherwise, whom should we believe? The Buddha? Don't even believe in the Buddha or teachers. We must believe in ourselves. The Buddha taught us we will be our own refuge. The Buddha said 'attahi-attano-nato' - "One is one's own shelter." Since most people have no shelter, they turn to something else which prevents them from finding the real shelter."
Luangpor Thong Abhakaro

== See also ==
- Mindfulness
- Mindfulness Day
- Satipatthana Sutta

== Bibliography ==
Luangpor Teean, To One that Feels. Bangkok: Supa Printing Co, Ltd., 3rd Ed 2005, ISBN 974-94394-3-0
_____________, Normality, Bangkok: Luangpor Teean Foundation, 2004
_____________, Nibbana, Bangkok: Medchai Printing House, 2006 (Thai Version)
_____________, A Manual of Self-Awareness, Bangkok: Luangpor Teean Foundation, 1994
_____________, Teacher, teaching, Bangkok: Luangpor Teean Foundation, 1997, ISBN 974-89976-1-8
Luangpor Thong Abhakaro, Mahasati Meditation, Taiwan: Mahasati Meditation of Taiwan, 2009 (Chinese Version)
Anchalee Thaiyanond, Against the Stream: The Teaching of Luangpor Teean. Bangkok: Thammasat University Press., 1986
