= Mindfulness and technology =

Multidisciplinary technological movement

Mindfulness and technology is a movement in research and design, that encourages the user to become aware of the present moment, rather than losing oneself in a technological device. This field encompasses multidisciplinary participation between design, psychology, computer science, and religion. Mindfulness stems from Buddhist meditation practices and refers to the awareness that arises through paying attention on purpose in the present moment, and in a non-judgmental mindset. In the field of Human-Computer Interaction, research is being done on Techno-spirituality — the study of how technology can facilitate feelings of awe, wonder, transcendence, and mindfulness and on Slow design, which facilitates self-reflection. The excessive use of personal devices, such as smartphones and laptops, can lead to the deterioration of mental and physical health. This area focuses on redesigning and creating technology to improve the wellbeing of its users.

== Mindfulness theory ==
In 1979, Jon Kabat-Zinn founded the Mindfulness-Based Stress Reduction (MBSR) program at the University of Massachusetts to treat the chronically ill. He is noted to be responsible for the popularization of mindfulness in Western culture. The program uses a combination of mindfulness meditation, body awareness, and yoga. These practices derived from teachings of the Eastern World, specifically Buddhist traditions. Researchers found that enhanced mindfulness through the program partly mediated the association between increased daily spiritual experiences and improved mental-health-related quality of life.

Early studies of mindfulness focused on health issues related to psychosomatic and psychiatric disorders, while later studies of mindfulness explore the business sector, showing an increase in creativity and a decrease in burnout. Studies on the relationship between mindfulness and technology are fairly new, with some of the more recent research highlighting the importance the practice plays in safety.

== Technology ==
=== Software ===
Neurofeedback makes conditions like attention, stress, arousal or mind-wandering visible. Real-time feedback leads to operant conditioning, a new form of learning which makes learning new techniques like Mindfulness and Meditation easier. There are several applications for desktop and mobile to help users bring themselves back to the present moment, including Calm and Headspace. One of these mobile apps has been shown through a randomized controlled trial to help alleviate acute stress, while improving mood; and may provide long-term benefits on attentional control.

==== Mindfulness bell ====
According to Vietnamese Zen teacher Thich Nhat Hanh, the ringing of a bell every 15 minutes is an effective way to cultivate the mindfulness practice and connect back with the body. Apps can simulate a bell on the user's personal device.

==== Meditation ====
The Frontiers in Human Neurosciences, published November 2012, proves that emotional reactivity can be down-regulated with Mindful Attention training. Changes in brain activity by meditating, stay in everyday life, not just when meditating. Thus, meditation changes the mental function, whereas more practice facilitates more change.

A 2011 brain imaging study, published in the Journal of Neuroscience, found that even very brief instruction in mindfulness meditation (four 20-minute sessions) was effective in relieving pain by reducing the brain's emotional response to painful stimuli. To help make meditation and mindfulness more accessible, developers have created digital health platforms, such as Am Mindfulness, Headspace, Insight Timer and Buddhify. Currently, Am Mindfulness is the only commercially available meditation app that has outperformed placebos in randomized controlled trials.

=== Wearables ===
There are several wearables which measures the breath in order to connect the user back to their body. Wo.Defy is a dress which attempts to reveal the beauty of emotional communication using the common platform of the human breath; proposing the best methods of human to human communication lie within us. Spire measures your breathing patterns to give you insights into your state of mind. Being, the mindfulness tracker from Zensorium, maps user's emotions (stressed, excited normal and calm) through heart rate variability. WellBe monitors heart rate levels and then matches them, through a patent pending algorithm, to specific moments and interactions throughout a user's day. SmartMat is a responsive mat embedded with 21,000 sensors to detect your body's balance, pressure and alignment. Prana's platform evaluates breath patterns, takes into account the effects of posture on breathing, and differentiates between diaphragmatic and chest breathing, three critical components of assessing the true quality of breathing, previously unaddressed by systems such as spirometers or pulse oximeters.

=== Virtual Reality ===
Sonic Cradle enables users to shape sound with their breath while suspended in a completely dark chamber. The researchers conducted a qualitative study with 39 participants to show how persuasive media has the potential to promote long-term psychological health by experientially introducing a stress-relieving, contemplative practice to non-practitioners.

Because the nature of chronic pain is complex, pharmacological analgesics are often not enough to achieve an ideal treatment plan. The system incorporates biofeedback sensors, an immersive virtual environment, and stereoscopic sound titled the "Virtual Meditative Walk" (VMW). It was designed to enable chronic pain patients to learn Mindfulness-based stress reduction (MBSR), a form of meditation. By providing real-time visual and sonic feedback, VMW enables patients to learn how to manage their pain.

== Techno-spirituality ==
Intel anthropologist Genevieve Bell has urged the human-computer interaction (HCI) research community to devote more research to the use of technology in spirituality and religion. Techno-spirituality is the study of how technology can facilitate feelings of awe, wonder, transcendence, and mindfulness. Currently, there are 6,000 applications related to spirituality and religion. This area is in high demand and "important under-explored areas of HCI research".

Inspired by Bell's work, researchers (Sterling & Zimmerman) focused on how mobile phones could be incorporated in American Soto Zen Buddhist community, without conflicting with their philosophy of "the here and the now". They were able to find three ways to use technology to help strengthen ties within the community.

== Interaction Design ==
=== Slow Design ===
Slow design is a design agenda for technology aimed at reflection and moments of mental rest rather than efficiency in performance.

=== Mindful Design ===
Mindful design, based on Langer's theory of mindfulness, is a design philosophy that incorporates the idea of mindfulness into creating meaningful user oriented design. A major tenant is the behavior change of a user through awareness and responsibility of meaningful interactions between user and designed object, and this will encourage more desirable human practices. This type of mind behavior driven change has been most heavily incorporated design for sustainability. Other approaches include crime prevention or health. It is also seen in the design of safety objects and the social interaction of performative objects.

Performative objects are identified as design objects that are designed to facilitate mindful awareness of the physical and symbolic social actions and their consequences within which they are used.

== Mindfulness and Silicon Valley ==
Classes in mindfulness practices have become part of some of Silicon Valleys major tech giants. Google has implemented a series of bimonthly "mindfulness lunches" as well as built a labyrinth for walking meditations. Both Twitter and Facebook have incorporated contemplative practices into their corporate culture. The desired outcome of using mindfulness in the tech workforce is to increase communication and develop the emotional intelligence of their employees. Fullmind advanced mindfulness training for employees and managers uses neurofeedback technology in a group application. Collective neurofeedback allows tracking of the training outcome and makes health management with mindfulness training measurable.

== Internet Addiction and Mindfulness ==
Mindfulness is currently being explored by researchers as a possible treatment for technological addiction, also known as Internet addiction disorder, a form of behavioral addiction. There has been some consensus in the field of psychology on the benefits of using mindfulness to treat behavioral addiction. Experts in the field say in order to treat technology addiction with mindfulness, one must be non-judgmental about the behavior and pay attention in order to recognize instances in which technology is being used mindlessly. Then reflect on the helpfulness of the device, and notice the benefits of disconnecting. The three keystones of mindfulness are: Intention, Attention and Action. Technology is said to interfere with mindfulness by causing the individual to forget what matters (intention), the distracts (attention), and then keeps the individual from taking action.

In technological addiction, the reward system, located in the mid-brain and underlies addiction, evolved to rewards finding and consuming food. In complex animals this evolution also rewards the exchange of information within the social group. In humans this has developed into its current form of mass worldwide communication. The exchange of social information has demonstrated reward based reinforcement, similar to that of gamification.

== Criticisms ==
Critics of the mindfulness movement in technology focus on several key areas, technophobia, pacifications of genuine grievances in the workforce and disconnection from religious roots. The editor of the New Republic, Eygeny Morozov, questions the value of tech companies who advocate "unplugging" from the modern digital lifestyle as similar to a drug addict taking a tolerance break from the substance they are addicted to in order to then increase the vigor with which those activities are then resumed (3, 4). They also state that the concept of Mindfulness in the tech world is jargonistic and amorphous.

=== Mobile ===
Mobile meditation applications like Calm, Headspace and MyLife have over a million users and are increasing in popularity. Swedish Researchers found that downloading and using the applications for eight weeks made little to no difference for people with major depression and anxiety. They did, however, see improvements with a subgroup with mild levels of depression. Mindfulness apps are also associated with a range of challenges to engagement.

=== Disconnectionists ===
Criticisms of the slow technology movement are similar to the slow-food movement; it lacks understanding of global scope, and as an individualistic response will not answer the actual problems in technology. This movement has been dubbed by critics as disconnectionists. Mindfulness in technology has been criticized as being less about restoring self and more about stifling autonomy that technology inspires. Anti-disconnectionists state mindfulness and the expressed need to disconnect from technology and the modern world can be accused of being a nostalgia-manipulating marketing tactic and maybe a technological form of conservatism. Critics state that the labeling of digital connection as debasing and unnatural is in direct proportion to the rapidity of adoption. Thus it is depicted as a dangerous desire and toxin to be regulated. This argument itself can be tied back to rationalization, Walter Benjamin on aura, Jacques Ellul on technique, Jean Baudrillard on simulations, or Zygmunt Bauman and the Frankfurt School on modernity and the Enlightenment. Critics state that disconnectionists see the Internet as having normalized or enforced a repression of an authentic self in favor of a social media avatar. Thus reflecting the desire to connect with a deeper self, which may itself be an illusion. The pathologization of technology use then opens the door for Foucault's idea of "normalization" to be applied to technology in similar fashion as other social ills, which then can become a concept around which social control and management can be applied.

=== Buddhist concerns ===
There is some concern among Buddhist practitioners that decoupling meditation and mindfulness from the core tenement of Buddhism may have negative effects. The wide adoption of mindfulness in technology and the tech industry has been accused of increasing passivity in the worker by creating a calm mindstate which then allows for disconnection from actual grievances. Critics of mindfulness in Cognitive Behavior Therapy also comment on this as a possible problem. However, critics of the movement, such as Ronald Purser, fear that the secularization of mindfulness, dubbed McMindfulness, leads to reinforcement of anti-Buddhist ideas. Buddhists differentiate between Right Mindfulness (samma sati) and Wrong Mindfulness (miccha sati). The distinction is not moralistic: the issue is whether the quality of awareness is characterized by wholesome intentions and positive mental qualities that lead to human flourishing and optimal well-being for others as well as oneself. Mindfulness as adopted by the Silicon Valley tech giants has been criticized as conveniently shifting the burden of stress and toxic work environment onto the individual employee. Obfuscated by the seemingly inherent qualities of care and humanity, mindfulness is refashioned into a way of coping with and adapting to the stresses and strains of corporate life rather than actually solving them.

== See also ==
- Mindfulness
- Buddhist meditation
- Mindfulness Day
