= Luangpor Thong Abhakaro =

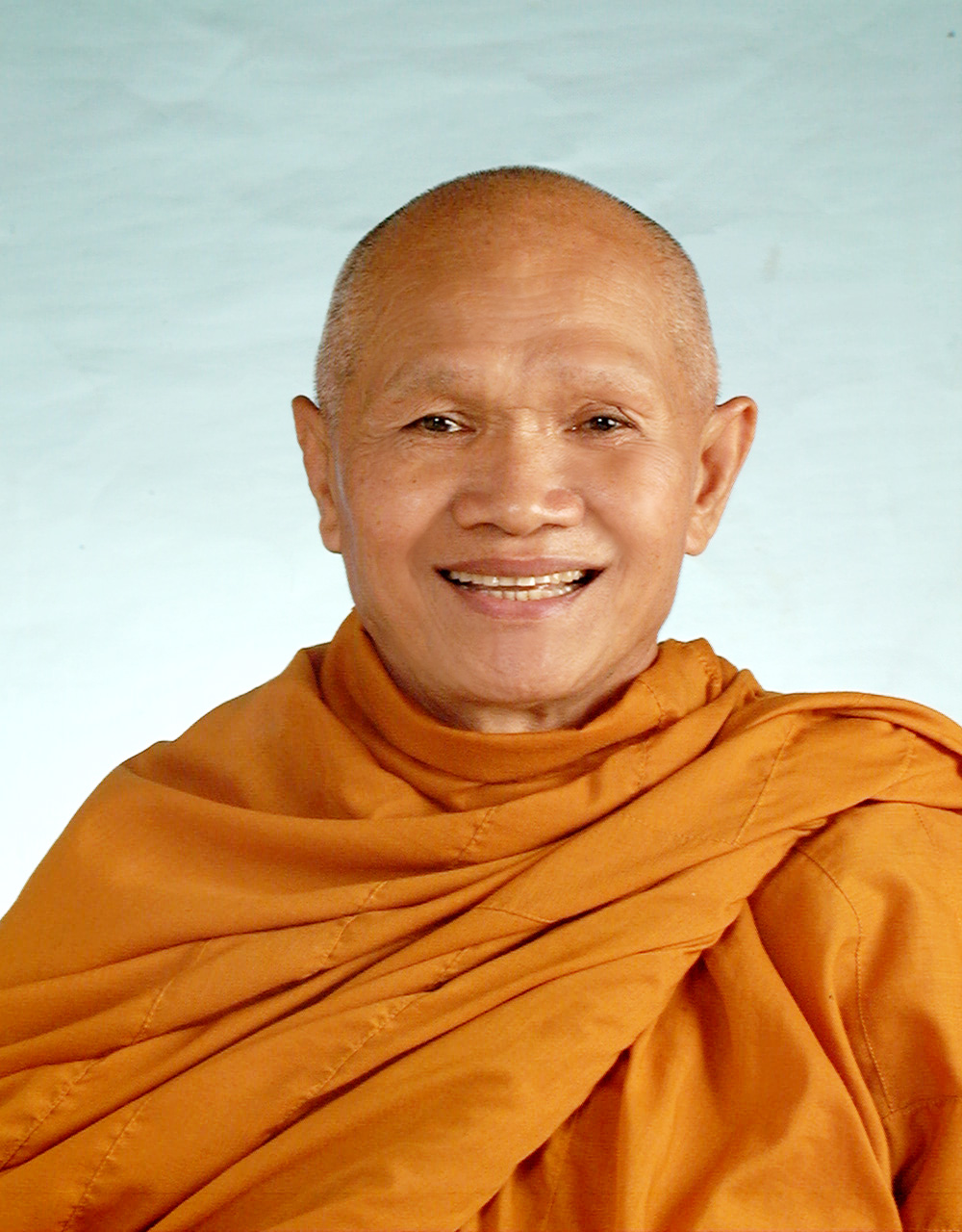

Personal life
- Born: May 14, 1939 (age 87) Muang District, Nong Bua Lumpoo province, Thailand

Religious life
- Religion: Buddhist
- School: Theravada

Senior posting
- Teacher: Luangpor Teean Jittasubho
- Based in: Wat Sanamnai, (Thailand)

Luangpor Thong Abhakaro, commonly referred to as Luangpor Thong is a Buddhist monk and teacher of Mahasati meditation, a meditation method developed by his teacher, Luangpor Teean Cittasubho. The title Luangpor is used in Thailand to express respect for senior Buddhist monks and it means 'venerable father'.

== Biography ==
Luangpor Thong Abhakaro was born on 14 May 1939 at Mueang Nongbua Lamphu District, Nong Bua Lamphu Province, northeast Thailand. His father died when he was seven years old. In 1961, at the age of 22, Thong was fully ordained as a monk, and received his Buddhist name, Abhakaro. Then Luangpor Thong studied the traditional Dhamma courses for six years.

In 1967, Luangpor Thong met Luangpor Teean Jittasubho, the founder of Mahasati meditation. He asked his teacher for an intensive meditation retreat under his guidance and asked permission to remain secluded in a small cottage practicing by himself, without any obligation to go chanting or asking for alms. Teean agreed. Since then, this arrangement became a regular practice during Teean's meditation retreats. Thong practiced this method continuously for thirty days and reached the state of Rupa-Nama (body-mind basic stage). Luangpor Thong continued practicing without interruption for another nine days, and achieved the state of "birth-extinction"—an understanding of life and death.

In 1985, Luangpor Teean appointed Luangpor Thong abbot of Wat Sanamnai, the most important Mahasati meditation center in Thailand. In 1989, Luangpor Teean died. That year, the "Luangpor Teean Jittasubho (Pann Intapew) Foundation" was founded, with Luangpor Thong as its president.

In 1995, Luangpor Thong established the "Mahasati Association of America", a non-profit organisation with the mission of teaching Mahasati meditation in the United States.

== Teachings ==
A form of vipassana or insight meditation, Mahasati meditation uses movement of the body to generate self-awareness and self-realisation. Mahasati meditation is practiced throughout Asia and in the United States and is appropriate for anyone regardless of religion or nationality.
