= Nirbhay N. Singh =

Psychologist

Nirbhay N. Singh, PhD
- Education: University of Auckland (PhD)
- Known for: psychology of mindfulness
- Scientific career
- Fields: Mindfulness, Child psychology, Psychiatry
- Workplaces: Virginia Commonwealth University, Augusta University

Nirbhay N. Singh is a psychologist who has been a professor at many universities and has served as editor-in-chief of several psychology journals, and founding editor of multiple journals that include Mindfulness. Singh received graduate education in New Zealand and has held academic posts in the United States.

== Education and personal life ==
Singh received a master's degree in psychology (1974) and a doctoral degree in psychology (1978) from the University of Auckland in New Zealand. His doctoral thesis was titled Attentional responses during discrimination learning by retarded children. Singh is also a doctoral-level Board Certified Behavior Analyst (BCBA-D).

In a published profile in 2018, Singh reported having had a life-long practice of meditation in the Soto Zen tradition, and has also received training in other Hindu and Buddhist methods of meditation.

== Editor ==
=== Editor: journals ===
Singh was the founding editor of Mindfulness (2010-), a journal he continued to edit as of 2018. Singh has also been the editor of the Journal of Child and Family Studies, which he also continued to edit in 2018. Furthermore, he has served as the founding editor of Advances in Neurodevelopmental Disorders (2017-), which he continued to edit in 2018. Earlier he edited Journal of Behavioral Education.

=== Editor: book series ===
As of 2018, Singh was the editor of three-book series: Mindfulness in Behavioral Health, Evidence-based Practice in Behavioral Health, and Children and Families.

== Academic posts ==
Singh has been a professor of psychiatry, Pediatrics and Psychology at the Virginia Commonwealth University School of Medicine, where he was also Director of the Commonwealth Institute for Family Studies, Richmond, Virginia. Singh has served as Clinical Professor of Psychiatry and Health Behavior at the Medical College of Georgia, Augusta University (formerly named Georgia Regents University), where he now adjunct professor of psychiatry at Augusta University.

== Publications ==
Singh has contributed more than 680 publications, including books, book chapters, and peer-reviewed papers. Some of his books are listed here:

Edited books on meditation or mindfulness:

- Stanley, Steven; Purser, Ronald E.; Singh, Nirbhay N., eds. (2018). Handbook of ethical foundations of mindfulness. Mindfulness in Behavioral Health. Cham, Switzerland: Springer. doi:10.1007/978-3-319-76538-9. ISBN 9783319765389. OCLC 1045629781.
- Shonin, Edo; Van Gordon, William; Singh, Nirbhay N., eds. (2015). Buddhist foundations of mindfulness. Mindfulness in Behavioral Health. Cham, Switzerland: Springer. doi:10.1007/978-3-319-18591-0. ISBN 9783319185903. OCLC 921883920.
- Singh, Nirbhay N., ed. (2014). Psychology of meditation. New York: Nova. ISBN 9781629486437. OCLC 935173265

Edited books on developmental or child psychology:

- Shogren, Karrie A.; Wehmeyer, Michael L.; Singh, Nirbhay N., eds. (2017). Handbook of Positive Psychology in Intellectual and Developmental Disabilities: Translating Research into Practice. Cham, Switzerland: Springer International. ISBN 9783319590660. OCLC 1008576951.
- Breland-Noble, Alfiee M.; Al-Mateen, Cheryl S.; Singh, Nirbhay N., eds. (2016). Handbook of mental health in African American youth. Cham, Switzerland: Springer. ISBN 9783319254999. OCLC 1074981181.
- Lang, Russell; Hancock, Terry B; Singh, Nirbhay N, eds. (2016). Early intervention for young children with autism spectrum disorder. Cham, Switzerland: Springer. ISBN 9783319309231. OCLC 939531765.
- Singh, Nirbhay N., ed. (2016). Handbook of evidence-based practices in intellectual and developmental disabilities. Cham, Switzerland: Springer International. ISBN 9783319265834. OCLC 950894946.

Edited books (other):

- Singh, Nirbhay N; Barber, Jack W; Van Sant, Scott, eds. (2016). Handbook of recovery in inpatient psychiatry. Cham, Switzerland: Springer. ISBN 9783319405353. OCLC 960194475.
