= Joan Swart =

South African psychologist and politician

Joan Swart, Psy.D.
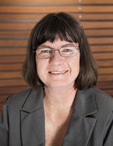
- Born: 28 September 1965 (age 60); Vereeniging, South Africa
- Education: Eisner Institute (Psy.D); American Military University (MA); Walden University (MA); North-West University (MBA); University of Stellenbosch (B.Eng)
- Known for: Research on criminal behaviour and adolescents with behaviour problems
- Scientific career
- Fields: Psychologist
- Workplaces: The Apsche Center for Mode Deactivation Therapy

Joan Swart (born 28 September 1965) is a South African psychologist, author, politician, and researcher who was the chief of staff of the Referendum Party (RP), an exco member of the Cape Independence Advocacy Group (CIAG), and a project manager at the Association for Coaching.

Swart has a doctorate of psychology (Psy.D) in Forensic Psychology from the Eisner Institute for Professional Studies in Encino, CA. She also holds a Masters of Business Administration (MBA) and a Masters in Military Studies at the American Military University.

In the 2024 South African general election, Swart was the 4th closed-list parliamentary candidate for the Referendum Party.

== Background and education ==
Swart was born in Vereeniging, South Africa and completed her school education at Handhaaf Primary School and Brandwag High School where she matriculated with six distinctions. She completed a BSc. (Chem. Eng.) degree at Stellenbosch University before working for various corporates, including Denel, Sasol, Sappi, and Mondi in various technical, business, and managerial roles. In 1996 she completed a Masters of Business Administration (MBA) at the then University of Potchefstroom. In 2011, she completed a master's degree in Forensic Psychology at Walden University, Minnesota, and a doctorate of psychology in Forensic Psychology at the Eisner Institute for Professional Studies, based in Encino, CA in 2013. Swart completed a Masters in Military Studies at the American Military University in 2024.

She is involved in private forensic psychology consultations, have done research and consulting at the Apsche Institute based in Leesburg, VA, and was a consulting committee member of the American Investigative Society of Cold Cases (AISOCC)[, a member of the Multidisciplinary Collaborative on Sexual Crime and Violence, and a review board member of the International Journal of Behavioral Consultation and Therapy.

She has also competed in a variety of sporting activities, and completed various long-distance running events, including the Everest Marathon, Boston Marathon, and Comrades Marathon (3 times).

== Early projects and specializations ==
Swart was affiliated with the Apsche Institute where she conducts research and consultation. The Apsche Center specializes in Mode Deactivation Therapy, a third-wave cognitive-behavioral therapy approach that was developed to treat adolescents with behavioral problems.

She was also a consulting committee member at the American Investigative Society of Cold Cases (AISOCC), which is a multidisciplinary group of scholar/practitioners, investigators, and others whose goal is to review cold cases in order to develop new leads/information and/or investigative strategies for the requesting agencies. She is a member of the AISOCC Behavioral Sciences Committee and Social Media Committee.

Swart was an editorial board member of the peer-reviewed journal, International Journal of Behavioral Consultation and Therapy (IJBCT), that is published by the American Psychological Association (APA).

== Coaching, supervising, and writing ==
Swart was the Head of Curriculum and coaching supervisor at the Jay Shetty Certification School from September 2019.

Swart is the Chief Editor of Jay Shetty's Purpose Ed magazine. In an interview in the launch issue, she spoke about how her Forensic Psychology work prepared her to better understand and appreciate the collective effects of trauma, which motivates her continued work in coaching, training, and education.

Swart is an accredited supervisor and project manager at the London-based professional body Association for Coaching where she pens a regular column in their flagship international publication Coaching Perspectives that explores the presence of mental health in coaching.

== Politics ==
Swart was the Chief of Staff of RP a radical centrist, secessionist party advocating for Cape independence. She was the party's 4th closed-list parliamentary provincial and national candidate in the 2024 general election. Swart was also an exco member of the CIAG, a pro-independence lobby group from which RP was founded. Swart left RP and CIAG in 2025.

Swart has since expressed concerns regarding external influence in secession movements where sustained local support has not been clearly demonstrated.

== Security and military analysis ==
Swart is a military analyst specialising in security studies, geopolitics, and strategic affairs, with a particular focus on Africa. She is completing doctoral research at the Stellenbosch University Faculty of Military Science.

== Selected publications ==
Since her involvement with Forensic Psychology, Joan has produced multiple peer-reviewed papers, other publications, and presentations.

- Swart, J., & Mellor, L. (2020). Homicide: A forensic psychology casebook. Boca Raton, FL: CRC Press.
- Anrtfield, M., & Swart, J. (2018). Social media and mental health: Depression, predators, and personality disorders. San Diego, CA: Cognella.
- Swart, J., Bass, C. K., & Apsche, J. A. (2015). Treating adolescents with family-based mindfulness. New York, NY: Springer.
- Swart, J., & Apsche, J. A. (2014). Family Mode Deactivation Therapy (FMDT) mediation analysis. International Journal of Behavioral Consultation and Therapy, 9(1), 1-13.
- Swart, J., & Apsche, J. A. (2014). A comparative treatment efficacy study of conventional therapy and Mode Deactivation Therapy (MDT) for adolescents with mood disorders, mixed personality disorders, and experiences of childhood trauma. International Journal of Behavioral Consultation and Therapy, 9(1), 23-29.
- Swart, J., & Apsche, J. A. (2014). Family Mode Deactivation Therapy (FMDT): A randomized controlled trial for adolescents with complex issues. International Journal of Behavioral Consultation and Therapy, 9(1), 14-22.
- Swart, J., & Apsche, J. A. (2014). Family Mode Deactivation Therapy (FMDT) as a contextual treatment. International Journal of Behavioral Consultation and Therapy, 9(1), 30-37.
- Swart, J. (2013). Homicide in armed conflict: A psychological perspective. Cape Town, South Africa: Quickfox Publishing. ISBN 978-0-620-57351-1.
- Swart, J. (2011, September). Prospects of criminal profiling: A critical review of the BRACE profile. 17th South African Psychology Congress, Johannesburg, South Africa.
- Swart, J. (2012, July). Female partner serial sex offenders: Folie à deux or coercion. 30th International Congress of Psychology, Cape Town, South Africa.
- Swart, J. (2011). Future prospects of criminal profiling: A meta-analysis and critical review. M.S. Dissertation. Walden University, Minneapolis, MN.
- Swart, J. (2012). In defense of Syria: The speeches of President Bashar al-Assad. Cape Town, South Africa: Quickfox Publishing. ISBN 978-0-620-54786-4.
- Swart, J. (2013). Homicide of civilians in armed conflict: A psychological perspective of offenders. Psy.D. Dissertation. Eisner Institute for Professional Studies, Encino, CA.
- Swart, J. (2013). Profiling the psychopath. Cape Town, South Africa: Quickfox Publishing. ISBN 978-0-620-53323-2.
- Swart, J. (2011, September). Epigenetics and prediction of antisocial behavior: A literature review and prospects for research. 17th South African Psychology Conference, Johannesburg, South Africa.
- Swart, J. (2013). Predisposition, antecedents, and prevention of police office familial homicide suicide: Case analyses in the South African context. Psy.D. research proposal. Eisner Institute for Professional Studies, Encino, CA.
- Swart, J, & Guirguis, C. (2023). The coach's casebook: Skills, tools and techniques for effective coaching. London: Kogan Page.
- Swart, J. (2022). The value of diagnostic skills for coaches and supervisors. Coaching Perspectives, 35, 54-55.
- Swart, J. (2022). Take care: Stewardship, ethics and executive coaching in the new world. Choice, 20(3), 29-31.

== See also ==
- Jack A. Apsche
- Mode Deactivation Therapy
- Referendum Party (South Africa)
