= Mindfulness (journal) =

- Discipline: Psychology
- Language: English
- Edited by: Oleg N. Medvedev

Publication details
- History: 2010–present
- Publisher: Springer Science+Business Media
- Frequency: Quarterly
- Impact factor: 3.801 (2021)

Standard abbreviations
- ISO 4: Mindfulness

Indexing
- ISSN: 1868-8527 (print); 1868-8535 (web)
- OCLC no.: 653103258

Links
- Journal homepage; Online archive

Mindfulness is a peer-reviewed academic journal on psychology published by Springer Science+Business Media. The journal's founding editor, beginning with the first issue in 2010, was Nirbhay N. Singh.

== Abstracting and indexing ==
The journal is abstracted or indexed in:

- Scopus
- PsycINFO
- Social Sciences Citation Index
- Academic OneFile
- Current Contents Social & Behavioral Sciences
- Health Reference Center Academic
- OCLC
- SCImago
- Summon by ProQuest

According to the Journal Citation Reports, the journal has a 2021 impact factor of 3.801.
