= Jack A. Apsche =

American psychologist (1947–2014)

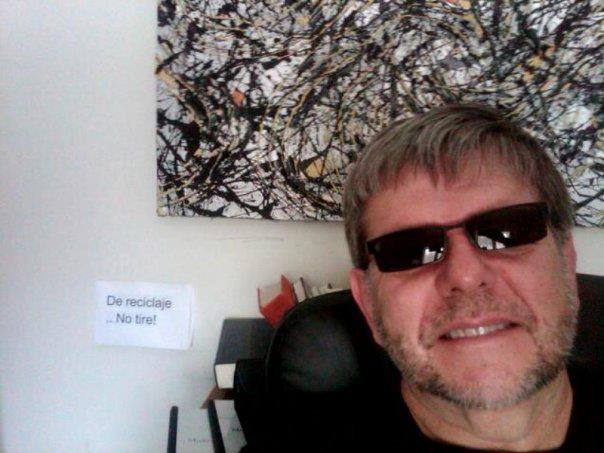
- Born: September 23, 1947; Philadelphia, Pennsylvania
- Died: October 12, 2014 (aged 67); Martinsburg, West Virginia
- Education: University of Pittsburgh, Temple University
- Known for: his research and practice on adolescents with behavior problems
- Awards: 2008, Jan S. Handleman, Ph.D. Award
- Scientific career
- Fields: Psychologist
- Workplaces: Walden University (Minnesota), The Apsche Center for Mode Deactivation Therapy

Jack A. Apsche (September 23, 1947 - October 12, 2014) was an American psychologist who has focused his work on adolescents with behavior problems. Apsche was also an author, artist, presenter, consultant and lecturer.

== Background and education ==
Apsche was born in Philadelphia, Pennsylvania. In 1967 through 1968 Apsche served as a Helicopter Door Gunner with the First Cavalry Division Airmobile in the Vietnam War and he was highly decorated for his service. After returning from his service in Vietnam, Apsche attended the University of Pittsburgh where he graduated with honors with a B.A. in Speech, English, Political Science and a minor in Psychology in 1973. He continued his education at Temple University, receiving an M.Ed, with an emphasis on psychological studies in education in 1977 and an Ed.D, in psychoeducational process and counselling psychology in 1986. While at Temple, Apsche edited The Effects of Punishment on Human Behavior. Apsche completed his post-doctoral internship at the Woodhaven Center at Temple University and his post-doctoral fellowship at the Joseph J. Peters Institute in Philadelphia. Apache resided in Shepherdstown, West Virginia.

== Career ==
Apsche is the program director for forensic psychology at the School of Psychology, College of Social and Behavioral Sciences at Walden University, Minnesota and the Founder of The Apsche Center for Mode Deactivation Therapy, also located in Virginia. Dr. Apsche is board certified in clinical child and adolescent psychology, clinical psychology, counseling psychology, cognitive and behavioral psychology, group psychology, couples and family psychology, and family psychology by the American Board of Professional Psychology. His primary research is in adolescent externalizing disorders.

Apsche is the developer of mode deactivation therapy (MDT) an evidence-based psychotherapy technique to treat the complex interplay between trauma, child abuse, personality disorder factors, conduct disorder, and a child's belief system that often lead to conduct problems such as aggression. MDT is a contextual behavior therapy, a type of psychotherapy that combines behavioral science with concepts of acceptance and mindfulness, derived from eastern and western contemplative practices. MDT integrates methodologies from mindfulness, cognitive behavioral therapy, acceptance and commitment therapy, dialectical behavior therapy, and functional analytic psychotherapy, which are woven together with some key concepts that are unique to MDT methods. The most notable of these is the validation, clarification, and redirection (VCR) methodology. VCR follows from the assessment and case conceptualization process steps and is aimed at validating the clients' past experiences, clarifying the resultant core beliefs, and redirecting behavioral responses that are caused by associated fear and coping mechanisms.

=== Teaching experience ===
Apsche was an adjunct professor for psychological studies and criminal justice at his alma mater, Temple University, from 1990 to 1998 and an associate professor of psychology and counseling at Regent University in 2003. Apsche is a community clinical professor of psychology and behavioral science at Eastern Virginia Medical School and an adjunct professor of psychology at Fielding Graduate University.

== Publications ==
Apsche is the principal author of the book titled "Mode Deactivation Therapy for Aggression and Oppositional Behavior in Adolescents: An Integrative Methodology Using ACT, DBT, and CBT". Apsche is the founding editor of the International Journal of Behavior Consultation and Therapy. He was a senior associate editor for the Behavior Analyst Today. Apsche also serves on the editorial board of Child Abuse & Neglect: The International Journal and is a senior associate editor for the Journal of Behavioral Analysis of Offender and Victim Treatment and Prevention.

Apsche has published several other books such as:

- Responsibility & Self-Management: A Client Workbook of Skills to Learn
- Responsibility and Self-Management: A Clinician's Manual and Guide for Case Conceptualization
- The Intimacy Manual: Balancing Control and Intimacy in the Bedroom and the Boardroom

In addition, Apsche has published extensively in scientific journals and has appeared in many newspaper publications.

== Awards and honors ==
Apsche has won several awards for his research and clinical work, including The Jan S. Handleman, Ph.D. Award in 2008, and was nominated for the Distinguished Practitioner Award in 2008 from the Association for the Treatment of Sexual Abusers (ATSA) and Behavior Analyst Online's 2007 Article of the Year.

The International Academy of Behavioral Medicine, Counseling and Psychotherapy awarded Dr. Apsche a Diplomate in Professional Psychology in 2009, and a Diplomate in Chemical Dependency Counseling in 2010. Apsche is the only Psychologist who is board certified in six specialty areas by the American Board of Professional Psychology.

== Forensic psychology ==
Apsche was an expert witness for the defense at the trial of serial killer Gary Heidnik and later profiled Heidnik in his book "Inside the Mind of a Serial Killer". In 2008, Apsche appeared in the Investigation Discovery program Escaped, which described the experience of one of Heidnik's surviving victims, Josefina Rivera. While Heidnik was in prison, Apsche communicated with him, stating afterwards that in the more than 150 handwritten pages of letters he found the roots of a way to treat troubled youth in the killer's mind. This provided the impetus for the development of the Mode Deactivation Therapy (MDT) methodology—a third wave therapy approach that proved effective to treat youth with complex behavioral problems and psychopathology.

Apsche also provided expert testimony during the trials of serial murderers Harrison "Marty" Graham and Juan Covington.
