= Mindfulness Day =

Annual event

Mindfulness Day is an emerging annual event, celebrated on September 12, on which day a variety of workshops and meditation groups are held with the intent to raise awareness to the general public about the profound value and benefit of mindfulness. In 2011, Mindfulness Day was designated to be September 12 by Wisdom Publications. In 2022, an online event to celebrate Mindfulness Day was organised by a mindfulness author.
