= Systemic therapy =

Psychotherapeutic discipline

Systemic therapy is a type of psychotherapy that seeks to address people in relationships, dealing with the interactions of groups and their interactional patterns and dynamics.

Early forms of systemic therapy were based on cybernetics and systems theory. Systemic therapy practically addresses stagnant behavior patterns within living systems without analyzing their cause. The therapist's role is to introduce creative "nudges" to help systems change themselves. This approach is increasingly applied in various fields like business, education, politics, psychiatry, social work, and family medicine.

== History ==
Systemic therapy has its roots in family therapy, or more precisely family systems therapy as it later came to be known. In particular, systemic therapy traces its roots to the Milan school of Mara Selvini Palazzoli, but also derives from the work of Salvador Minuchin, Murray Bowen, Ivan Boszormenyi-Nagy, as well as Virginia Satir and Jay Haley from MRI in Palo Alto. These early schools of family therapy represented therapeutic adaptations of the larger interdisciplinary field of systems theory which originated in the fields of biology and physiology.

The Systemic Family Therapy develops from Murray Bowen's theory, from the research he conducted in the late 1940s till the early 1950s at the NIMH. The research project had families live on the research ward for extended periods. Bowen and his staff conducted extensive observational research on each family's interactions. Bowen's theory of Systemic Family therapy had 8 concepts: "Triangles", "Differentiation of Self", "Nuclear Family Emotional Process", "Family Projection Process", "Multigenerational Transmission Process", "Emotional Cutoff", "Sibling Position", "Societal Emotional Process" In the late 1960s, he introduced the theory of family systems which was based on the structure and behavior of the family’s relationship system as opposed to traditional individual therapy. Bowen researched the family patterns of people with schizophrenia who were receiving treatment and the patterns of his own family of origin when families were viewed as complex systems. The number of elements and how they are organized can alter how complex the system is. The system is required to have control and feedback mechanisms, which is where cybernetics come in place. Norbert Wiener, a mathematician, came up with the term Cybernetics which refers to the study of the automatic control system. Another contributor to this system came from Gregory Bateson who created the idea that the family is a system governed by cybernetic principles which explains how individuals interact with each other, their connections to others, patterns, and their relationships.

Early forms of systemic therapy were based on cybernetics. In the 1970s this understanding of systems theory was central to the structural (Minuchin) and strategic (Haley, Selvini Palazzoli) schools of family therapy which would later develop into systemic therapy. In the light of postmodern critique, the notion that one could control systems or say objectively "what is" came increasingly into question. Based largely on the work of anthropologists Gregory Bateson and Margaret Mead, this resulted in a shift towards what is known as "second-order cybernetics" which acknowledges the influence of the subjective observer in any study, essentially applying the principles of cybernetics to cybernetics – examining the examination.

As a result, the focus of systemic therapy (ca. 1980 and forward) has moved away from a modernist model of linear causality and understanding of reality as objective, to a postmodern understanding of reality as socially and linguistically constructed.

== Practical application ==
Systemic therapy approaches problems practically rather than analytically. It seeks to identify stagnant patterns of behavior within a living system - a group of people, such as a family. It then addresses those patterns directly, without analyzing their cause. Systemic therapy does not attempt to determine past causes, such as subconscious impulses or childhood trauma, or to diagnose. Thus, it differs from psychoanalytic and psychodynamic forms of family therapy (for example, the work of Horst-Eberhard Richter).

Systemic therapy has a growing evidence base for the treatment of internalizing and other disorders in children and adolescents. A systematic review of 38 randomized trials found support for the effectiveness of systemic therapy in treating childhood behavioral and emotional disorders, including mood and conduct difficulties. Techniques such as reframing, in which problematic situations are recast in relational terms, are commonly used to help families develop new perspectives and practical approaches to managing ongoing difficulties.

Systemic therapists tailor their approach to the specific circumstances of each case, taking into account factors such as the presenting disorder, family structure, developmental history, and broader social context. Research on systemic competencies in child and adolescent mental health settings has emphasized the importance of assessing multiple levels of the client's relational environment when formulating treatment plans.

Systemic therapy is widely applied in family settings, where it is often referred to as systemic family therapy. Reviews of the evidence have found systemic family therapy to be effective for a range of child and adolescent difficulties, including conduct problems, substance misuse, and the management of chronic illness.

A central tenet of the postmodern turn in systemic therapy is that the therapist cannot directly change a system from the outside. Instead, the therapist's role is understood as introducing new perspectives or interactions that help the system reorganize itself. This view reflects a broader postmodern emphasis on the influence of culture, social context, and individual agency in shaping how problems are understood and addressed in therapy. Systemic therapists also attend to emotional processes within the family system, helping members identify and articulate relational patterns of emotion that may be maintaining difficulties.

Systemic therapy encompasses a range of specific techniques. One widely used approach is structural family therapy, in which the therapist actively intervenes to reshape the relational organization of the family. Structural therapists assess family boundaries, hierarchies, and subsystems, and work to address patterns that have become rigid or dysfunctional. Key techniques include challenging existing boundary patterns, realigning alliances and coalitions among family members, and restructuring the family's interactional patterns through in-session exercises such as enactments. These interventions aim to restore a more adaptive family organization in which roles, authority, and proximity among members support healthy functioning.

Family-oriented systemic interventions have shown positive results for infant sleep difficulties, one of the most common presenting problems in early childhood. These interventions typically involve guiding parents to establish consistent nighttime routines, adjust daytime sleep schedules, and reduce parent-infant interaction during nighttime awakenings. Research has found that such approaches can reduce night waking frequency and improve overall infant sleep outcomes.

Another technique that involves systemic therapy is conceptualization, which allows the therapist to gather the patient's symptoms in context and looks into how the patient experiences creating a pattern with other individuals or family. These forms of systemic therapy help people of any age group resolve their issues. Issues including anger management, addictions to substances, relationship problems, mood disorders, and more. Human interactions are connected to their emotions and in terms can branch out to their social, or cultural interventions. Evidence supports how systemic interventions have a positive effect on infants and certain emotional problems they may have such as behavior issues.

Systemic therapy neither attempts a 'treatment of causes' nor of symptoms; rather it gives living systems nudges that help them to develop new patterns together, taking on a new organizational structure that allows growth.

While family systems therapy only addresses families, systemic therapy in a similar fashion to Systemic hypothesising addresses other systems. The systemic approach is increasingly used in business, education, politics, psychiatry, social work, and family medicine.

=== Training ===
Systemic family therapy training typically combines academic coursework in systems theory with supervised clinical practice involving couples and families. Researchers have identified core competencies required for effective systemic practice, including relational assessment, de-escalation of conflict, tracking interactional cycles, and managing simultaneous therapeutic alliances with multiple family members. A study of competencies needed in child and adolescent mental health settings found that systemic therapists require skills in areas such as maintaining a systemic stance, formulating relational hypotheses, and working across complex family structures, and that these competencies can be specified and assessed within training programs. Deliberate practice methods have been applied to systemic family therapy training, in which trainees rehearse specific clinical skills through structured role play exercises at graduated levels of difficulty under supervisory guidance. For example, the nonprofit Sentio Marriage and Family Therapy program in California integrates deliberate practice of systemic therapy into its curriculum.

== See also ==
- List of therapies
- Systems theory
- Family therapy
- Systemic coaching
- Systems psychology
