= Family therapy =

Field of psychology centered on families

- ICD-9-CM: 94.42
- MeSH: D005196

Family therapy (also referred to as family counseling, family systems therapy, marriage and family therapy, couple and family therapy) is a branch of psychotherapy focused on families and couples in intimate relationships to nurture change and development. It tends to view change in terms of the systems of interaction between family members.

The different schools of family therapy have in common a belief that, regardless of the origin of the problem, and regardless of whether the clients consider it an "individual" or "family" issue, involving families in solutions often benefits clients. This involvement of families is commonly accomplished by their direct participation in the therapy session. The skills of the family therapist thus include the ability to influence conversations in a way that catalyses the strengths, wisdom, and support of the wider system.

In the field's early years, many clinicians defined the family in a narrow, traditional manner usually including parents and children. As the field has evolved, the concept of the family is more commonly defined in terms of strongly supportive, long-term roles and relationships between people who may or may not be related by blood or marriage.

The conceptual frameworks developed by family therapists, especially those of family systems theorists, have been applied to a wide range of human behavior, including organisational dynamics and the study of greatness.

== History and theoretical frameworks ==
Formal interventions with families to help individuals and families experiencing various kinds of problems have been a part of many cultures, probably throughout history. These interventions have sometimes involved formal procedures or rituals, and often included the extended family as well as non-kin members of the community (see, for example, Ho'oponopono). Following the emergence of specialization in various societies, these interventions were often conducted by particular members of a community—for example, a tribal chief, priest, physician, and so on—usually as an ancillary function.

Family therapy as a distinct professional practice within Western cultures can be argued to have had its origins in the social work movements of the 19th century in the United Kingdom and the United States. As a branch of psychotherapy, its roots can be traced somewhat later to the early 20th century with the emergence of the child guidance movement and marriage counseling. The formal development of family therapy dates from the 1940s and early 1950s with the founding in 1942 of the American Association of Marriage Counselors (the precursor of the AAMFT), and through the work of various independent clinicians and groups—in the United Kingdom (John Bowlby at the Tavistock Clinic), the United States (Donald deAvila Jackson, John Elderkin Bell, Nathan Ackerman, Christian Midelfort, Theodore Lidz, Lyman Wynne, Murray Bowen, Carl Whitaker, Virginia Satir, Ivan Boszormenyi-Nagy), and in Hungary, D.L.P. Liebermann—who began seeing family members together for observation or therapy sessions. There was initially a strong influence from psychoanalysis (most of the early founders of the field had psychoanalytic backgrounds) and social psychiatry, and later from behaviorism and behavior therapy—and significantly, these clinicians began to articulate various theories about the nature and functioning of the family as an entity that was more than a mere aggregation of individuals.

The movement received an important boost starting in the early 1950s through the work of anthropologist Gregory Bateson and colleagues—Jay Haley, Donald deAvila Jackson, John Weakland, William Fry, and later, Virginia Satir, Ivan Boszormenyi-Nagy, Paul Watzlawick and others—at Palo Alto in the United States, who introduced ideas from cybernetics and general systems theory into social psychology and psychotherapy, focusing in particular on the role of communication. This approach eschewed the traditional focus on individual psychology and historical factors—that involve so-called linear causation and content—and emphasized instead feedback and homeostatic mechanisms and "rules" in here-and-now interactions—so-called circular causation and process—that were thought to maintain or exacerbate problems, whatever the original cause(s). This group was also influenced significantly by the work of US psychiatrist, hypnotherapist, and brief therapist Milton H. Erickson—especially his innovative use of strategies for change, such as paradoxical directives. The members of the Bateson Project (like the founders of a number of other schools of family therapy, including Carl Whitaker, Murray Bowen, and Ivan Boszormenyi-Nagy) had a particular interest in the possible psychosocial causes and treatment of schizophrenia, especially in terms of the putative "meaning" and "function" of signs and symptoms within the family system. The research of psychiatrists and psychoanalysts Lyman Wynne and Theodore Lidz on communication deviance and roles (e.g., pseudo-mutuality, pseudo-hostility, schism, and skew) in families of people with schizophrenia also became influential with systems-communications-oriented theorists and therapists. A related theme—applying to dysfunction and psychopathology more generally—was that of the "identified patient" or "presenting problem" as a manifestation of or surrogate for the family's (or even society's) problems.

By the mid-1960s, a number of distinct schools of family therapy had emerged. From the groups that were most strongly influenced by cybernetics and systems theory there came Mental Research Institute brief therapy, strategic therapy, Salvador Minuchin's structural family therapy and the model proposed by Mara Selvini Palazzoli (i.e., the Milan systems model). Partly in reaction to some aspects of these systemic models came the experiential approaches of Virginia Satir and Carl Whitaker, which downplayed theoretical constructs and emphasized subjective experience and unexpressed feelings (including the subconscious), authentic communication, spontaneity, creativity, total therapist engagement, and often included the extended family. Concurrently, intergenerational therapies by Murray Bowen, Ivan Boszormenyi-Nagy, James Framo, and Norman Paul emerged. They proposed different theories on the intergenerational transmission of health and dysfunction, usually involving three generations in therapy or through "homework" and "journeys home." Psychodynamic family therapy—which, more than any other school of family therapy, deals directly with individual psychology and the unconscious mind in the context of current relationships—continued to develop through a number of groups that were influenced by the ideas and methods of Nathan Ackerman, the British school of object relations theory, and John Bowlby's work on attachment theory.

Multiple-family group therapy, a precursor of psychoeducational family intervention, emerged, in part, as a pragmatic alternative form of intervention—especially as an adjunct to the treatment of serious mental illnesses with significant biological underpinnings, such as schizophrenia—and represented something of a conceptual challenge to some of the systemic (and thus potentially "family-blaming") paradigms of pathogenesis that were implicit in many of the dominant models of family therapy. The late 1960s and early 1970s saw the development of network therapy (which bears some resemblance to traditional practices such as Ho'oponopono) by Ross Speck and Carolyn Attneave, and the emergence of behavioral marital therapy (renamed behavioral couples therapy in the 1990s) and behavioral family therapy as models in their own right.

By the late 1970s, the weight of clinical experience—especially in the treatment of serious mental disorders—had led to revisions of several of the original models and a moderation of earlier stridency and theoretical purism. There were the beginnings of a general softening of the strict demarcations between schools, with moves toward rapprochement, integration, and eclecticism—although there was, nevertheless, some hardening of positions within some schools. These trends were reflected in and influenced by lively debates within the field and critiques from various sources, including feminism and post-modernism, that reflected in part the cultural and political tenor of the times, and which foreshadowed the emergence (in the 1980s and 1990s) of the various post-systems constructivist and social constructionist approaches. While there was still debate within the field about whether, or to what degree, the systemic-constructivist and medical-biological paradigms were necessarily antithetical to each other (see also anti-psychiatry; biopsychosocial model), there was a growing willingness and tendency on the part of family therapists to work in multi-modal clinical partnerships with other members of the helping and medical professions.

From the mid-1980s to the present, the field has been marked by a diversity of approaches that partly reflect the original schools, but which also draw on other theories and methods from individual psychotherapy and elsewhere—these approaches and sources include: brief therapy, structural therapy, constructivist approaches (e.g., Milan systems, post-Milan/collaborative/conversational, and reflective), bringforthist approach (e.g., Karl Tomm's IPscope model and Interventive interviewing), solution focused brief therapy, narrative therapy, a range of cognitive behavioral therapy approaches, psychodynamic and object relations approaches, attachment and emotionally focused therapy, intergenerational approaches, network therapy, and multisystemic therapy (MST). Multicultural, intercultural, and integrative approaches are being developed, with Vincenzo Di Nicola weaving a synthesis of family therapy and transcultural psychiatry in his model of cultural family therapy, A Stranger in The Family: Culture, Families, and Therapy. Many practitioners claim to be eclectic, using techniques from several areas, depending upon their own inclinations and/or the needs of the client(s), and there is a growing movement toward a single "generic" family therapy that seeks to incorporate the best of the accumulated knowledge in the field and which can be adapted to many different contexts. Nonetheless, there are still a significant number of therapists who adhere more or less strictly to a particular, or limited number of, approach(es).

The liberation-based healing framework for family therapy offers a complete paradigm shift for working with families while addressing the intersections of race, class, gender identity, sexual orientation, and other socio-political identity markers. This theoretical approach and praxis is informed by critical pedagogy, feminism, critical race theory, and decolonizing theory. It necessitates an understanding of the ways colonization, cisheteronormativity, patriarchy, white supremacy and other systems of domination impact individuals, families and communities and centers the need to disrupt the status quo in how power operates. Traditional Western models of family therapy have historically ignored these dimensions, and when white, male privilege has been critiqued, largely by feminist theory practitioners, it has often been to the benefit of middle-class, white women's experiences. While an understanding of intersectionality is of particular significance in working with families with violence, a liberatory framework examines how power, privilege and oppression operate within and across all relationships. Liberatory practices are based on the principles of critical consciousness, accountability, and empowerment. These principles guide not only the content of therapeutic work with clients but also the supervisory and training processes for therapists. Rhea Almeida developed the cultural context model as a way to operationalize these concepts into practice through the integration of culture circles, sponsors, and a socio-educational process within the therapeutic work.

Ideas and methods from family therapy have been influential in psychotherapy generally: a survey of over 2,500 US therapists in 2006 revealed that of the 10 most influential therapists of the previous quarter-century, three were prominent family therapists and that the marital and family systems model was the second-most-utilized model after cognitive behavioral therapy.

== Techniques ==
Family therapy uses a range of counseling and other techniques including:

- Structural therapy – identifies and re-orders the organisation of the family system
- Strategic therapy – looks at patterns of interactions between family members
- Systemic/Milan therapy – focuses on belief systems
- Narrative therapy – restorying of dominant problem-saturated narrative, emphasis on context, separation of the problem from the person
- Transgenerational therapy – transgenerational transmission of unhelpful patterns of belief and behaviour
- IPscope model and Interventive Interviewing
- Communication theory
- Psychoeducation
- Psychotherapy
- Relationship counseling
- Relationship education
- Systemic coaching
- Systems theory
- Reality therapy
- the genogram
- [(Family constellations/sculpting)]

The number of sessions depends on the situation, but the average is 5–20 sessions. A family therapist usually meets several members of the family at the same time. This has the advantage of making differences between the ways family members perceive mutual relations as well as interaction patterns in the session apparent both for the therapist and the family. These patterns frequently mirror habitual interaction patterns at home, even though the therapist is now incorporated into the family system. Therapy interventions usually focus on relationship patterns rather than on analyzing impulses of the unconscious mind or early childhood trauma of individuals as a Freudian therapist would do – although some schools of family therapy, for example psychodynamic and intergenerational, do consider such individual and historical factors (thus embracing both linear and circular causation) and they may use instruments such as the genogram to help to elucidate the patterns of relationship across generations.

The distinctive feature of family therapy is its perspective and analytical framework rather than the number of people present at a therapy session. Specifically, family therapists are relational therapists: they are generally more interested in what goes on between individuals rather than within one or more individuals, although some family therapists – in particular those who identify as psychodynamic, object relations, intergenerational, or experiential family therapists (EFTs) – tend to be as interested in individuals as in the systems those individuals and their relationships constitute. Depending on the conflicts at issue and the progress of therapy to date, a therapist may focus on analyzing specific previous instances of conflict, as by reviewing a past incident and suggesting alternative ways family members might have responded to one another during it, or instead proceed directly to addressing the sources of conflict at a more abstract level, as by pointing out patterns of interaction that the family might have not noticed.

Family therapists tend to be more interested in the maintenance and/or solving of problems rather than in trying to identify a single cause. Some families may perceive cause-effect analyses as attempts to allocate blame to one or more individuals, with the effect that for many families a focus on causation is of little or no clinical utility. A circular way of problem evaluation is used as opposed to a linear route. Using this method, families can be helped by finding patterns of behaviour, what the causes are, and what can be done to better their situation.

== Evidence base ==
Family therapy has an evolving evidence base. A summary of current evidence is available via the UK's Association of Family Therapy. Evaluation and outcome studies can also be found on the Family Therapy and Systemic Research Centre website. The website also includes quantitative and qualitative research studies of many aspects of family therapy.

According to a 2004 French government study conducted by French Institute of Health and Medical Research, family and couples therapy was the second most effective therapy after Cognitive behavioral therapy. The study used meta-analysis of over a hundred secondary studies to find some level of effectiveness that was either "proven" or "presumed" to exist. Of the treatments studied, family therapy was presumed or proven effective at treating schizophrenia, bipolar disorder, anorexia and alcohol dependency.

== Concerns and criticism ==
In a 1999 address to the Coalition of Marriage, Family and Couples Education conference in Washington, D.C., University of Minnesota Professor William Doherty said:

I take no joy in being a whistle blower, but it's time. I am a committed marriage and family therapist, having practiced this form of therapy since 1977. I train marriage and family therapists. I believe that marriage therapy can be very helpful in the hands of therapists who are committed to the profession and the practice. But there are a lot of problems out there with the practice of therapy – a lot of problems.

Doherty suggested questions prospective clients should ask a therapist before beginning treatment:

1. "Can you describe your background and training in marital therapy?"
2. "What is your attitude toward salvaging a troubled marriage versus helping couples break up?"
3. "What is your approach when one partner is seriously considering ending the marriage and the other wants to save it?"
4. "What percentage of your practice is marital therapy?"
5. "Of the couples you treat, what percentage would you say work out enough of their problems to stay married with a reasonable amount of satisfaction with the relationship." "What percentage break up while they are seeing you?" "What percentage do not improve?" "What do you think makes the differences in these results?"

== Licensing and degrees ==
Family therapy practitioners come from a range of professional backgrounds, and some are specifically qualified or licensed/registered in family therapy (licensing is not required in some jurisdictions and requirements vary from place to place). In the United Kingdom, family therapists will have a prior relevant professional training in one of the helping professions usually psychologists, psychotherapists, or counselors who have done further training in family therapy, either a diploma or an M.Sc. In the United States there is a specific degree and license as a marriage and family therapist; however, psychologists, nurses, psychotherapists, social workers, or counselors, and other licensed mental health professionals may practice family therapy. In the UK, family therapists who have completed a four-year qualifying programme of study (MSc) are eligible to register with the professional body the Association of Family Therapy (AFT), and with the UK Council for Psychotherapy (UKCP).

A master's degree is required to work as a Marriage and Family Therapist (MFT) in some American states. Most commonly, MFTs will first earn a M.S. or M.A. degree in marriage and family therapy, counseling, psychology, family studies, or social work. After graduation, prospective MFTs work as interns under the supervision of a licensed professional and are referred to as an MFTi.

Prior to 1999 in California, counselors who specialized in this area were called Marriage, Family and Child Counselors. Today, they are known as Marriage and Family Therapists (MFT), and work variously in private practice, in clinical settings such as hospitals, institutions, or counseling organizations.

Marriage and family therapists in the United States and Canada often seek degrees from accredited Masters or Doctoral programs recognized by the Commission on Accreditation for Marriage and Family Therapy Education (COAMFTE), a division of the American Association of Marriage and Family Therapy.

Requirements vary, but in most states about 3000 hours of supervised work as an intern are needed to sit for a licensing exam. MFTs must be licensed by the state to practice. Only after completing their education and internship and passing the state licensing exam can a person call themselves a Marital and Family Therapist and work unsupervised.

License restrictions can vary considerably from state to state. Contact information about licensing boards in the United States are provided by the Association of Marital and Family Regulatory Boards.

There have been concerns raised within the profession about the fact that specialist training in couples therapy – as distinct from family therapy in general – is not required to gain a license as an MFT or membership of the main professional body, the AAMFT.

=== Values and ethics ===
Since issues of interpersonal conflict, power, control, values, and ethics are often more pronounced in relationship therapy than in individual therapy, there has been debate within the profession about the different values that are implicit in the various theoretical models of therapy and the role of the therapist's own values in the therapeutic process, and how prospective clients should best go about finding a therapist whose values and objectives are most consistent with their own. An early paper on ethics in family therapy written by Vincenzo Di Nicola in consultation with a bioethicist asked basic questions about whether strategic interventions "mean what they say" and if it is ethical to invent opinions offered to families about the treatment process, such as statements saying that half of the treatment team believes one thing and half believes another. Specific issues that have emerged have included an increasing questioning of the longstanding notion of therapeutic neutrality, a concern with questions of justice and self-determination, connectedness and independence, functioning versus authenticity, and questions about the degree of the therapist's pro-marriage/family versus pro-individual commitment.

The American Association for Marriage and Family Therapy requires members to adhere to a code of ethics, including a commitment to "continue therapeutic relationships only so long as it is reasonably clear that clients are benefiting from the relationship."

== Founders and key influences ==
Some key developers of family therapy are:

- Alfred Adler (individual psychology)
- Nathan Ackerman (psychoanalytic)
- Tom Andersen (reflecting practices and dialogues about dialogues)
- Harlene Anderson (postmodern collaborative therapy and Collaborative Language Systems)
- Maurizio Andolfi (interactional, integrative, multigenerational, and relational family therapy)
- Harry J Aponte (Person-of-the-Therapist)
- Jack A. Apsche (family mode deactivation therapy, FMDT)
- Gregory Bateson (1904–1980) (cybernetics, systems theory)
- Ivan Boszormenyi-Nagy (contextual therapy, intergenerational, relational ethics)
- Murray Bowen (systems theory, intergenerational)
- Steve de Shazer (solution focused therapy)
- Vincenzo Di Nicola (cultural family therapy)
- Milton H. Erickson (hypnotherapy, strategic therapy, brief therapy)
- Richard Fisch (brief therapy, strategic therapy)
- James Framo (object relations theory, intergenerational, family-of-origin therapy)
- Edwin Friedman (family process in religious congregations)
- Harry Goolishian (postmodern collaborative therapy and collaborative language systems)
- John Gottman (marriage)
- Robert-Jay Green (LGBT, cross-cultural issues)
- Douglas Haldane (Attachment-based couple therapist)
- Jay Haley (strategic therapy, communications)
- Lynn Hoffman (strategic, post-systems, collaborative)
- Don D. Jackson (systems theory)
- Sue Johnson (emotionally focused therapy, attachment theory)
- Walter Kempler (Gestalt psychology)
- Cloe Madanes (strategic therapy)
- Salvador Minuchin (structural family therapy)
- Braulio Montalvo (structural family therapy)
- Virginia Satir (communications, experiential, conjoint and co-therapy)
- Mara Selvini Palazzoli (Milan family systems therapy)
- Roy Shuttleworth (Drama therapy, group therapy, marital)
- Robin Skynner (group analysis)
- Karl Tomm (IPscope model and interventive interviewing, Bringforthism)
- Paul Watzlawick (brief therapy, systems theory)
- John Weakland (brief therapy, strategic therapy, systems theory)
- Carl Whitaker (family systems, experiential, co-therapy)
- Michael White (narrative therapy)
- Lyman Wynne (schizophrenia, pseudomutuality)

== Summary of theories and techniques ==
(references:)

Theoretical model	Theorists	Summary	Techniques
Adlerian family therapy	Alfred Adler	Also known as individual psychology. Sees the person as a whole. Ideas include compensation for feelings of inferiority leading to striving for significance toward a fictional final goal with a private logic. Birth order and mistaken goals are explored to examine mistaken motivations of children and adults in the family constellation.	Psychoanalysis, typical day, reorienting, re-educating
Attachment theory	John Bowlby, Mary Ainsworth, Douglas Haldane	Individuals are shaped by their experiences with caregivers in the first three years of life. Used as a foundation for object relations theory. The strange situation experiment with infants involves a systematic process of leaving a child alone in a room in order to assess the quality of their parental bond.	Psychoanalysis, play therapy
Bowenian family systems therapy	Murray Bowen, Betty Carter, Philip Guerin, Michael Kerr, Thomas Fogarty, Monica McGoldrick, Edwin Friedman, Daniel Papero	Also known as intergenerational family therapy, although there are also other schools of intergenerational family therapy. Family members are driven to achieve a balance of internal and external differentiation, causing anxiety, triangulation, and emotional cutoff. Families are affected by nuclear family emotional processes, sibling positions and multigenerational transmission patterns resulting in an undifferentiated family ego mass.	Detriangulation, nonanxious presence, genograms, coaching
Cognitive behavioral family therapy	John Gottman, Albert Ellis, Albert Bandura	Problems are the result of operant conditioning that reinforces negative behaviors within the family's interpersonal social exchanges that extinguish desired behavior and promote incentives toward unwanted behaviors. This can lead to irrational beliefs and a faulty family schema.	Therapeutic contracts, modeling, systematic desensitization, shaping, charting, examining irrational beliefs
Collaborative language systems therapy	Harry Goolishian, Harlene Anderson, Tom Andersen, Lynn Hoffman, Peggy Penn	Individuals form meanings about their experiences within the context of social relationship on a personal and organizational level. Collaborative therapists help families reorganize and dis-solve their perceived problems through a transparent dialogue about inner thoughts with a "not-knowing" stance intended to illicit new meaning through conversation. Collaborative therapy is an approach that avoids a particular theoretical perspective in favor of a client-centered philosophical process.	Dialogical conversation, not knowing, curiosity, being public, reflecting teams
Communications approaches	Virginia Satir, John Banmen, Jane Gerber, Maria Gomori	All people are born into a primary survival triad between themselves and their parents where they adopt survival stances to protect their self-worth from threats communicated by words and behaviors of their family members. Experiential therapists are interested in altering the overt and covert messages between family members that affect their body, mind and feelings in order to promote congruence and to validate each person's inherent self-worth.	Equality, modeling communication, family life chronology, family sculpting, metaphors, family reconstruction
Contextual therapy	Ivan Boszormenyi-Nagy	Families are built upon an unconscious network of implicit loyalties between parents and children that can be damaged when these relational ethics of fairness, trust, entitlement, mutuality and merit are breached.	Rebalancing, family negotiations, validation, filial debt repayment
Cultural family therapy	Vincenzo Di Nicola Key influences: Celia Falicov, Antonio Ferreira, James Framo, Edwin Friedman, Mara Selvini Palazzoli, Carlos Sluzki, Victor Turner, Michael White	A synthesis of systemic family therapy with cultural psychiatry to create cultural family therapy (CFT). CFT is an interweaving of stories (family predicaments expressed in narratives of family life) and tools (clinical methods for working with and making sense of these stories in cultural context). Integrates and synthesizes systemic therapy and cultural and medical anthropology with narrative therapy	Conceptual tools for working across cultures – spirals, masks, roles, codes, cultural strategies, bridges, stories, multiple codes (metaphor and somatics), therapy as "story repair"
Emotion-focused therapy	Sue Johnson, Les Greenberg	Couples and families can develop rigid patterns of interaction based on powerful emotional experiences that hinder emotional engagement and trust. Treatment aims to enhance empathic capabilities of family members by exploring deep-seated habits and modifying emotional cues.	Reflecting, validation, heightening, reframing, restructuring
Experiential family therapy	Carl Whitaker, David Keith, Laura Roberto, Walter Kempler, John Warkentin, Thomas Malone, August Napier	Stemming from Gestalt foundations, change and growth occurs through an existential encounter with a therapist who is intentionally authentic with clients without pretense, often in a playful and sometimes absurd way as a means to foster flexibility in the family and promote individuation.	Battling, constructive anxiety, redefining symptoms, affective confrontation, co-therapy, humor
Family mode deactivation therapy (FMDT)	Jack A. Apsche	Target population adolescents with conduct and behavioral problems. Based on schema theory. Integrate mindfulness to focus family on the present. Validate core beliefs based on past experiences. Offer viable alternative responses. Treatment is based on case conceptualization process; validate and clarify core beliefs, fears, triggers, and behaviors. Redirect behavior by anticipating triggers and realigning beliefs and fears.	Cognitive behavioral therapy, mindfulness, acceptance and commitment therapy, dialectical behavior therapy, defusion, validate-clarify-redirect
Family-of-origin therapy	James Framo	He developed an object relations approach to intergenerational and family-of-origin therapy.	Working with several generations of the family, family-of-origin approach with families in therapy and with trainees
Feminist family therapy	Sandra Bem Marianne Walters	Complications from social and political disparity between genders are identified as underlying causes of conflict within a family system. Therapists are encouraged to be aware of these influences in order to avoid perpetuating hidden oppression, biases and cultural stereotypes and to model an egalitarian perspective of healthy family relationships.	Demystifying, modeling, equality, personal accountability
Milan systemic family therapy	Luigi Boscolo, Gianfranco Cecchin, Mara Selvini Palazzoli, Giuliana Prata	A practical attempt by the Milan Group to establish therapeutic techniques based on Gregory Bateson's cybernetics that disrupts unseen systemic patterns of control and games between family members by challenging erroneous family beliefs and reworking the family's linguistic assumptions.	Hypothesizing, circular questioning, neutrality, counterparadox
MRI brief therapy	Gregory Bateson, Milton Erickson, Heinz von Foerster	Established by the Mental Research Institute (MRI) as a synthesis of ideas from multiple theorists in order to interrupt misguided attempts by families to create first and second order change by persisting with "more of the same", mixed signals from unclear metacommunication and paradoxical double-bind messages.	Reframing, prescribing the symptom, relabeling, restraining (going slow), Bellac Ploy
Narrative therapy	Michael White, David Epston	People use stories to make sense of their experience and to establish their identity as a social and political constructs based on local knowledge. Narrative therapists avoid marginalizing their clients by positioning themselves as a co-editor of their reality with the idea that "the person is not the problem, but the problem is the problem."	Deconstruction, externalizing problems, mapping, asking permission
Object relations therapy	Hazan & Shaver, David Scharff & Jill Scharff, James Framo	Individuals choose relationships that attempt to heal insecure attachments from childhood. Negative patterns established by their parents (object) are projected onto their partners.	Detriangulation, co-therapy, psychoanalysis, holding environment
Psychoanalytic family therapy	Nathan Ackerman	By applying the strategies of Freudian psychoanalysis to the family system therapists can gain insight into the interlocking psychopathologies of the family members and seek to improve complementarity	Psychoanalysis, authenticity, joining, confrontation
Solution focused therapy	Kim Insoo Berg, Steve de Shazer, William O'Hanlon, Michelle Weiner-Davis, Paul Watzlawick	The inevitable onset of constant change leads to negative interpretations of the past and language that shapes the meaning of an individual's situation, diminishing their hope and causing them to overlook their own strengths and resources.	Future focus, beginner's mind, miracle question, goal setting, scaling
Strategic therapy	Jay Haley, Cloe Madanes	Symptoms of dysfunction are purposeful in maintaining homeostasis in the family hierarchy as it transitions through various stages in the family life cycle.	Directives, paradoxical injunctions, positioning, metaphoric tasks, restraining (going slow)
Structural family therapy	Salvador Minuchin, Harry Aponte, Charles Fishman, Braulio Montalvo	Family problems arise from maladaptive boundaries and subsystems that are created within the overall family system of rules and rituals that governs their interactions.	Joining, family mapping, hypothesizing, reenactments, reframing, unbalancing

== Journals ==
- Australian and New Zealand Journal of Family Therapy
- Contemporary Family Therapy
- Family Process
- Family Relations
- Family Relations, Interdisciplinary Journal of Applied Family Studies ISSN 0197-6664
- Journal of Family Therapy
- Marriage Fitness
- Murmurations: Journal of Transformative Systemic Practice
- Sexual and Relationship Therapy
- Journal of Marital & Family Therapy
- Families, Systems and Health

== See also ==
- Alternative dispute resolution
- Acceptance and commitment therapy
- CAMFT
- Child abuse
- Conflict resolution
- Cognitive behavioral therapy
- Deinstitutionalisation
- Domestic violence
- Dysfunctional family
- Emotionally focused therapy
- ENRICH
- Family Environment Scale
- Family Life Education
- Family Life Space
- Identified patient
- Impact Therapy
- Internal Family Systems Model
- Interpersonal psychotherapy
- Interpersonal relationship
- Mediation
- Mindfulness-based cognitive therapy
- Multisystemic Therapy (MST)
- Positive psychology
- Relationship education
- Relationships Australia
- Strategic Family Therapy
- Abnormal Psychology
