= Ivan Boszormenyi-Nagy =

Hungarian-American family therapist

- Born: Iván Nagy; 19 May 1920; Budapest, Hungary
- Died: 28 January 2007 (aged 86); Glenside, Pennsylvania, U.S.
- Known for: Family therapy, Psychoanalysis
- Scientific career
- Fields: Psychiatry

Ivan Boszormenyi-Nagy (May 19, 1920 – January 28, 2007) was a Hungarian-American psychiatrist and one of the founders of the field of family therapy. Born Iván Nagy, his family name was changed to Böszörményi-Nagy during his childhood. He emigrated from Hungary to the United States in 1950, and he simplified his name to Ivan Boszormenyi-Nagy at the time of his naturalization as a US citizen.

== Contextual therapy ==
Boszormenyi-Nagy is best known for developing the Contextual approach to family therapy and individual psychotherapy. It is a comprehensive model which integrates individual psychological, interpersonal, existential, systemic, and intergenerational dimensions of individual and family life and development.

The contextual model, in its most well-known formulation, proposes four dimensions of relational reality, both as a guide for conducting therapy and for conceptualizing relational reality in general:

1. Facts (e.g., genetic input, physical health, ethnic-cultural background, socioeconomic status, basic historical facts, events in a person's life cycle, etc)
2. Individual psychology (the domain of most individual psychotherapies)
3. Systemic transactions (the domain covered by classical systemic family therapy: e.g., rules, power, alignments, triangles, feedback, etc)
4. Relational ethics.

These dimensions are taken to be inter-linked, but not equatable or reducible to one another.

The contextual model proposes relational ethics—the ethical or "justice" dimension of close relationships—as an overarching integrative conceptual and methodological principle. Relational ethics focuses in particular on the nature and roles of connectedness, caring, reciprocity, loyalty, legacy, guilt, fairness, accountability, and trustworthiness - within and between generations. It is taken to represent not just a set of prescriptive norms, nor simply psychological phenomena, perspectives, or constructions. Rather, relational ethics is seen as (1) having some objective ontological and experiential basis by virtue of being derived from basic needs and from real relationships that have concrete consequences (i.e., as distinct from abstract or "value" ethics); and (2) as being significant explanatory and motivational dynamics operating - in both beneficial and destructive ways - in individuals, families, social groups, and broader society. The construct validity and significance of relational ethics in clinical and educational contexts have been supported by a number of studies.

In a later formulation of the contextual model, Boszormenyi-Nagy proposed a fifth dimension - the ontic dimension - which was implicit in the earlier formulations, but which considers more explicitly the nature of the interconnection between people that allows an individual to exist decisively as a person, and not just a self. (See also Intersubjectivity and Philosophy of dialogue.)

=== Methodology ===
Multidirected partiality is the main methodological principle of contextual therapy. Its aim is to evoke a dialogue of responsible mutual position-taking among family members. It consists of a sequential, empathic turning towards member after member (even absent members), in which both acknowledgement and expectation are directed at them. It is an alternative to the more common 'neutrality' or unilateral partiality of other approaches. It requires an appreciation of the 'ledger' from each person's point of view, even that of the current victimizer.

For example, a family comes into therapy desiring to fix their son's outbursts and oppositional defiant behavior. The therapist (and possibly a co-therapist where appropriate) would first seek basic information (including any relevant clinical or medical information), construct a genogram if possible, and have each family member explain their side of the story (either conjointly or in individual sessions as appropriate), in order to begin to understand the problem in terms of background facts, the relational context (i.e., intergenerational, interpersonal, and systemic), and deeper motivational factors (e.g., psychological processes, hidden loyalties and legacies, ledger imbalances, destructive entitlement resulting from real or perceived injustices, scapegoating, parentification of the child, etc.), and not simply (as is commonly done in some other approaches) in terms of the 'behaviour', 'systemic interactions', 'cognitions', or 'narratives' of the family and the son.

Having gained this preliminary understanding of the situation, the therapist would firstly address any issues requiring urgent attention (e.g., physical welfare, prevention of violence, etc.), especially in relation to the interests of the most vulnerable member(s), whether or not they are present at the therapy sessions. The therapist would then go further, carefully and sequentially 'taking the side' of each member (while seeking to maintain overall balance, but not 'joining' the family as occurs, for example, in structural therapy), the aim being to begin a genuine dialogue of mutual accountability, to reduce the reliance on dysfunctional acting-out, and to find resources (e.g., hope, will) for rebuilding relationships through mutual acknowledgement of both entitlements and obligations, shifts in attitude and intention (but not 'relabeling' as in strategic or constructivist approaches), fair exoneration, and redemptive or rejunctive (i.e., 'trust-building') actions, that will in turn build individual and relational maturity and integrity (i.e., self-validation and self-delineation - contextual counterparts of Bowen's differentiation), and trustworthiness, which contextual therapists see as the ultimate relational resource for individual and family well-being.

The approach would be adapted - although the basic principles would remain the same - according to the particular case; for example: adults having problems with their siblings or elderly parents; couples issues; conflicts associated with blended families, adoption, fostering, gamete donation and surrogacy; migration and cross-cultural issues; different mental disorders; addiction and substance abuse; criminal behavior, domestic violence, and so on.

The contextual approach allows for the inclusion of many significant aspects of other approaches to psychotherapy and family therapy, provided that they are consistent with the overarching contextual principle of multilateral therapeutic ethical concern and accountability.

== Bibliography ==
- Boszormenyi-Nagy, I., & Framo, J. (Eds.) (1965; 1985). Intensive family therapy: Theoretical and practical aspects. New York: Harper & Row. (Second edition, New York: Brunner/Mazel)
- Boszormenyi-Nagy, I., & Spark, G. (1973; 1984). Invisible loyalties: Reciprocity in intergenerational family therapy. New York: Harper & Row. (Second edition, New York: Brunner/Mazel)
- Boszormenyi-Nagy, I., & Krasner, B. (1986). Between give and take: A clinical guide to contextual therapy. New York: Brunner/Mazel.
- Boszormenyi-Nagy, I. (1987). Foundations of contextual therapy: Collected papers of Ivan Boszormenyi-Nagy, MD. New York: Brunner/Mazel.
- Boszormenyi-Nagy, I., Grunebaum, J., & Ulrich, D. (1991). Contextual Therapy. In A. Gurman & D. Kniskern (Eds.) Handbook of Family Therapy, Vol 2. New York: Brunner/Mazel.

== See also ==
- Justice
- Ethic of care
- Object relations theory
- Existential therapy
- Integrative psychotherapy
- Conflict resolution
- Mediation
- Restorative justice
- Martin Buber
- Martti Olavi Siirala
