= Strategic Family Therapy =

Strategic Family Therapy is a modality of family therapy that focuses on problem-solving in relationship dynamics and utilizing behavioral solutions to facilitate change in the family. There are three prominent models of Strategic Family Therapy, through the Mental Research Institute, the teachings of Jay Haley and Cloé Madanes, and the Milan Systemic Model as posited by Mara Selvini Palazzoli, Gianfranco Cecchin, Luigi Boscolo, and Giuliana Prata.

== Theoretical Frameworks ==
Strategic Family Therapy emphasizes the constant communication in a system, even the withdrawing of vocal communication as a form of communicating. There is the function of a report and command, a report being the content of what is communicated, and the command referring to the relational pattern that contextualizes the report, such as how it is said or the indirect messages being implied by what is said or asked. These patterns develop into family rules, a concept that emerged from Structural Family Therapy: "family rules are defined as an invisible set of functional demands that persistently organizes the interaction of the family."

Haley and Madanes focused heavily on the function of the symptoms presented on how they affect the family system. Family attempts to solve and decrease these symptoms can further perpetuate the issues if they are not successful.

There is less emphasis on insight and more emphasis on behavioral change and noticing patterns of behavior that are perpetuated in feedback loops. The Strategic therapist works with the family on not only accomplishing First-Order Change (immediate behavioral change) but also Second-Order Change (changes in the structure, family rules, the system altogether that holds the behavioral issues in place). In other words, the system created by the family must be changed, or solutions for behavioral problems may not hold.

Quoting Richard Niolon: "There are three models for problem development:

a. cybernetic (runaway positive feedback loops)

b. structural (flawed family hierarchies)

c. functional (one member develops symptoms to control others)

The MRI use only the cybernetic model, Haley and Madanes use all 3 but Haley stresses the structural and Madanes the functional, and the Milan's use both structural and functional.

Example: Tommy is 16 and has recently refused to go out of the house. 1. MRI would focus on getting Tommy out, believing the parents attempted solutions kept him home.

2. Haley and Madanes would focus on the triadic relationship between Tommy and his 2 parents. Haley would wonder about the parents unresolved conflicts and marital struggles, Madanes would wonder about how Tommy staying home helped one or both of his parents.

3. Milan would focus on the family's history and hidden power struggles, or family games, in which Tommy is embedded and has to stay home to help a family member "win."

Jay Haley and Salvador Minuchin influenced one another and have similarities in their approaches.

== Uses ==
Strategic family therapy as a short-term form of family therapy can be utilized with youths who struggle with behavioral issues such as drug addiction and delinquency.

Cloé Madanes has taken her Strategic approach and, in collaboration with Tony Robbins, Mark Peysha, and Magali Peysha, developed a coaching method initially known as Strategic Intervention.

== See also ==
- Family therapy
- Jay Haley
- Cloé Madanes
- Mental Research Institute
- Mara Selvini Palazzoli
- Milton H. Erickson
