= AFTA =

AFTA or Afta may refer to:

- Afta, a brand of aftershave by Mennen
- ASEAN Free Trade Area
- Galactan 5-O-arabinofuranosyltransferase, an enzyme
- American Family Therapy Academy, a family therapy organisation founded in 1978 by Murray Bowen
