= A Stranger in the Family =

1997 book by Vincenzo Di Nicola

A Stranger in the Family: Culture, Families, and Therapy
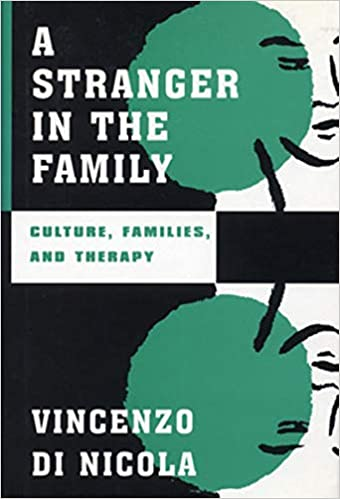
- Cover of the first edition
- Author: Vincenzo Di Nicola
- Language: English
- Subject: Family therapy, Cultural psychiatry
- Publisher: W. W. Norton & Company
- Publication date: 1997
- Publication place: United States
- Media type: Print
- Pages: 380
- ISBN: 0-393-70228-6
- OCLC: 36126477
- Preceded by: The Myth of Atlas: Families & the Therapeutic Story (editor & translator, 1989)
- Followed by: Letters to a Young Therapist (2011)

A Stranger in The Family: Culture, Families, and Therapy is a text written by Canadian cultural psychiatrist and family therapist Vincenzo Di Nicola integrating family therapy and cultural psychiatry to create a model of cultural family therapy.

Di Nicola's approach to working with families across cultures brought together a new synthesis of family therapy and transcultural psychiatry. Critical reviews were positive and encouraging by leaders in family therapy, such as Mara Selvini Palazzoli and Celia Jaes Falicov, as well as those in transcultural psychiatry, such as Armando Favazza.

This preliminary work was collected and integrated into his model of cultural family therapy in A Stranger in the Family in 1997. In a 2022 interview with the Université de Montréal where he teaches, Di Nicola traces the origins and motivations for this work to his childhood origins as an Italian immigrant with empathy for the plight of immigrant children and families.

== Outline of the book ==
=== Introduction ===
Cultural family therapy (CFT) is a synthesis of family therapy and transcultural psychiatry.

CFT is an interweaving of "stories" (family predicaments expressed in narratives of family life) and "tools" (clinical methods for working with and making sense of these stories in cultural context). By interweaving stories and tools, CFT is aimed at understanding and change. Neither one alone suffices, as each of them produces only part of the solution.

The book recounts over two dozen family "stories" varying from brief vignettes and cameo portraits to longer, more detailed multigenerational narratives.

Nine "conceptual tools" for CFT are described. "Tools" refers to the actions and thoughts of therapists, part of their toolkit. Some are actions (like "spirals"), others are like lenses (such as "masks").

The book is divided into three parts, each with an overarching theme.

=== Part I: Meeting strangers ===
Chapter 1. The strange and the familiar: intercultural encounters among families, therapists, and consultants

An overture, sounding the main themes: intercultural consulting is introduced, stories of families moving across cultures, issues of translation. "Spirals", the first conceptual tool of CFT is introduced, describing a way of meeting strangers through negotiation and collaboration, integrating the work of Mara Selvini Palazzoli's Milan systemic family therapy and Michael White's narrative therapy.

Chapter 2: Cultural family therapy: a new synthesis

Outlines a synthesis of family therapy with transcultural psychiatry, critiquing family therapy's use of culture. The need for multiple descriptions of predicaments; two basic therapeutic temperaments (technocratic and phenomenological); and problems with family therapy across cultures. "Paradigm" and "syntagm" are contrasted, the latter calling for a fresh approach, seeing each family as a unique culture.

Chapter 3: The presenting culture: a context for family therapy

An update of the synthesis, reframing the presenting issue in therapy as the "presenting culture" as opposed to the "presenting problem". The second conceptual tool of CFT is "masks" or cultural costume and camouflage, inspired by the work of family therapist Edwin Friedman. The third conceptual tool of CFT is about "roles" of insiders and outsider, describing how the therapist positions in relation to the family.

=== Part II: On the threshold: language, identity, and cultural change ===
Chapter 4: Beyond Babel: cultural and therapeutic translation

This chapter examines language and translation in culture and therapy, inspired by the seminal work on translation by George Steiner in After Babel. Translation across cultures is reviewed in light of the work of British cultural anthropologist Mary Douglas' essay, "Self-evidence" in Implicit Meanings. "Codes" is the fourth conceptual tool of CFT. Cultural and therapeutic translation are illustrated with clinical vignettes.

Chapter 5: Changelings: children and families in cultural transition

Examines identity and cultural change. The "presenting culture" is the royal road for understanding "mind", "self", and "identity". Changelings—children and families undergoing cultural change—are explored through five stories of migrant children. "Cultural strategies" is the fifth conceptual tool of CFT, exploring adaptation and acculturation.

Chapter 6: Threshold therapy: liminal people and transitional states

Calls for the study of liminal people and transitional states, inspired by the work of British cultural anthropologist Victor Turner. The relationship between culture and mental illness is reviewed and culture-change syndromes are defined and illustrated with clinical vignettes of children with selective mutism. CFT is described as threshold therapy with liminal people.

Chapter 7: Stones and bridges: the myth of independence

Examines "the myth of independence" as a theme in Western psychological theories and therapies. Two aspects are examined: (1) how independence is enshrined as a goal in Western family therapy, (2) how this differs in India and Japan.

Chapter 8: Stones without bridges: four orphan cases

Four "orphan cases" are presented. Cut off from a more complete relationship to her family and society, each of these women suffered in a unique way. This illustrates the implications of the myth of independence and identifies the sixth conceptual tool of CFT—"bridges"—or understanding the family life cycle in cultural context.

=== Part III: Families as storying cultures ===
Chapter 9: The garden of forking paths: exploring a family's alternities of being

Explores the use of CFT's conceptual tools in family narratives. "Stories" is the seventh conceptual tool of CFT—a family's evolving narrative and therapy itself as "the garden of forking paths", a metaphor from a short story by Jorge Luis Borges, meaning a series of choices. This year-long story of the course of family's therapy demonstrates all the tools presented so far in the book—spirals of negotiation, cultural translation, and playing with roles, masks, cultural strategies, and bridges.

Chapter 10: The web of meaning: metaphor and the transformation of experience

Metaphor and its power to transform experience is the subject of this chapter. Metaphor opens the "web of meaning" of other lives. Working with a Portuguese immigrant family illustrates the potential for narrative transformation, the eighth conceptual tool of CFT—"multiple codes"—multiple messages encoded in metaphor (figurative language) and somatics (embodied meaning).

Chapter 11: Strangers no more: a family therapist meets his father

Concludes with the author's own family story, with several layers: his journey to meet his father in Brazil, how to stitch fragments and outtakes into a coherent whole, and reflections on the nature of therapy. If family predicaments are "stories gone awry", as narrative therapy sees it, then "suturing"—the ninth and final conceptual tool offers CFT as "story repair".

== Reception ==
A Stranger in the Family was well-received as an important contribution to working with immigrant families. Following this positive reception of Di Nicola's work on cultural family therapy, a Brazilian edition in Portuguese translation, Um Estranho na Família: Cultura, Famílias e Terapia appeared in 1998. Di Nicola continued to elaborate his model of cultural family therapy in articles, chapters, a follow-up volume, Letters to a Young Therapist: Relational Practices for the Coming Community, as well as invitations to present the 4th Annual Stokes Endowment Lecture in family studies at The George Washington University and a thirty-year perspective on his model presented at McGill University where he first developed it and the Accademia di Psicoterapia della Famiglia in Rome, Italy where Di Nicola's model is taught.

== See also ==
- Cross-cultural psychology
- Cross-cultural studies
- History of the family
- Sociology of the family
