= Multisystemic therapy =

Multisystemic therapy (MST) is an intense, family-focused and community-based treatment program for juveniles with serious criminal offenses who are possibly abusing substances. It is also a therapy strategy to teach their families how to foster their success in recovery.

The goals of MST are to lower rates of criminal behavior in juvenile offenders. There are several things MST therapy must include: integration of empirically based treatment to acknowledge a large variety of risk factors that may be influencing the behavior; rewards for positive changes in behavior and environment to ultimately empower caregivers; and many thorough quality assurance mechanisms that focus on completing objectives set in treatment

== Medical uses ==
A 2017 meta-analysis of family-based treatments for serious juvenile offenders found "long-lasting, treatment effects" in reducing antisocial behavior and improving other outcomes when compared with conventional community services. A meta-analysis of MST in 2014 reported small improvements in delinquency, psychological problems, and substance use, particularly with younger juveniles.

In 2012 a literature review compared common treatments including cognitive behavioral therapy, 12-step facilitation, multisystemic therapy, psychoeducation, and motivational interviewing in an attempt to identify the best treatments for substance-abusing adolescents with conduct problems. The authors concluded that family-based interventions produced superior outcomes, and that MST had "the most compelling evidence," noting that the providers are often well trained and supervised. Family-based interventions such as MST may have farther reaching impacts as well when compared to other interventions. Specifically, Wagner et al. (2013) and Dopp et al. (2017) conducted follow-up studies with clients and their families who had participated in either MST or IT (Individual Therapy) 20–25 years earlier; they found that caregivers and siblings of clients who participated in MST were themselves less likely to have been convicted of a felony.

== Methods ==
Multisystemic therapy (MST) is a home and community based intervention for juvenile offenders and is used predominately to address violent offending, sex offending, delinquency, and substance abuse. In this intensive intervention, at least one team of two to four therapists and a therapist supervisor provides around 60 to 100 hours of direct services, typically over the course of three to six months. MST draws upon many practices from strategic family therapy, structural family therapy, and cognitive behavior therapy. It is based in part on ecological systems theory; therapists address individual, family, peer, school, and neighborhood risk factors that lead to antisocial behavior. MST also is informed by the theory that the family is the key to affecting change. MST works to improve parenting practices and family relationships and functioning in order to reduce antisocial behavior.

Therapists follow a process called the MST Analytic Process (or "Do Loop") in which they work with the client and family to identify and address "drivers," or factors which could contribute to antisocial behaviors. "Drivers" could include many factors that affect the client, such as caregiver unemployment, substance use, or lack of supervision, and client association with deviant peers and lack of involvement in school. Treatment depends on the "drivers" and often may involve establishing a behavior plan at home, increasing caregiver monitoring of behavior, addressing disputes with parents and teachers, reducing the client's interactions with deviant peers, and helping the client establish prosocial behaviors and peer groups. Overall, treatment is individualized depending on the social systems surrounding the youth. Although treatment is highly variable, it always includes nine core principles. These are:

1. The client exists within a series of systems
2. Practitioners use existing positive systems to help client create change
3. Interventions should include increased responsibility of family members
4. MST is present-focused and action-oriented
5. Each interventions targets a specific behavior
6. MST interventions should match the developmental age of the child for which they are created
7. Family members are needed to enact interventions
8. Evaluation of interventions occur from multiple perspectives
9. Each intervention is made to be used long term and in multiple settings

In addition, adaptations to MST have been created that provide intensive family and community-based treatment for a variety of challenges that face youth. These include MST-CAN (Child Abuse and Neglect), MST-Psychiatric, for youth with psychotic behavior or who are at risk of suicide or homicide, and MST-HC (Health Care), for youth with chronic health conditions and challenges with treatment adherence.

== History ==
The MST method was originally a collection of procedures practiced by Dr. Scott Henggeler in the 1970s. He soon brought in Charles Borduin and Molly Brunk, two of his doctoral students, to help with the theory's documentation. To bring their project to fruition, Henggeler, Borduin, and Brunk combined evidence-based practice models with the positive aspects of other behavior theories, and created the calling card of MST by emphasizing family preservation and strengthening of relationships among juvenile delinquents. Since then, there have been a few tweaks to the original design, and in 1990 MST as it is known today was born. For being so new, MST has been tested many times in many settings, and in most it has shown to have the longest lasting positive effects for troubled youth and their families.

After the finalization of the MST method, the MST Institute was founded as a nonprofit corporation to be "responsible for setting quality assurance standards and monitoring the implementation of Multisystemic Therapy in all programs worldwide"

== Use in the Juvenile Justice System ==
Practitioners increasingly use Multisystemic Therapy to help youth within the juvenile justice system to reintegrate into society rather than standard probation or treatment as usual (TAU). MST differs from the usual tactics in that it targets criminogenic factors related to an individual's social environment, particularly within the family system. It has been identified as a promising treatment model for juvenile offenders by the U.S. Surgeon General in reducing rates of recidivism.
