= Vincenzo Di Nicola =

Italian-Canadian psychologist

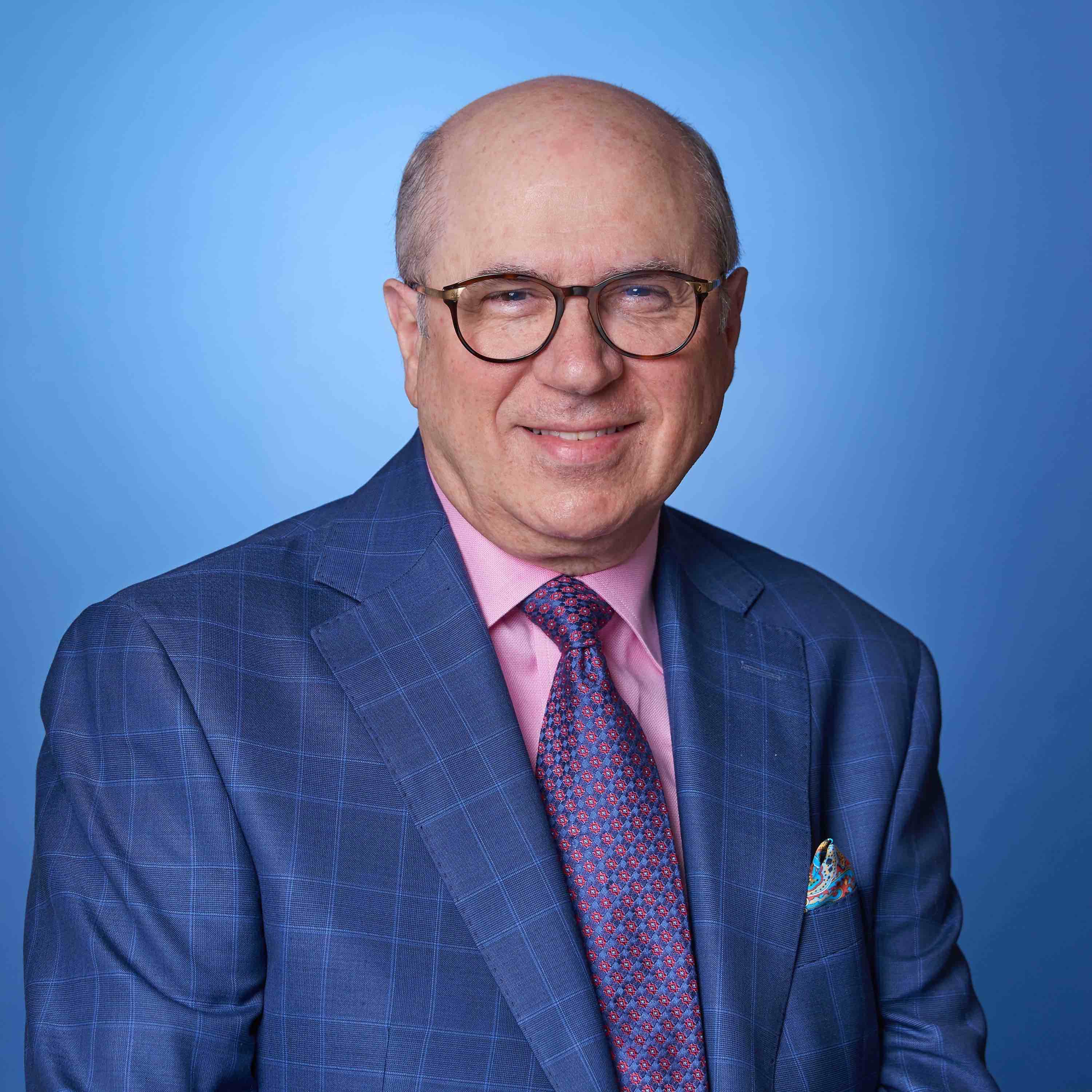
- Born: Vincenzo Giovanni Franco Di Nicola; June 23, 1953 (age 73); Collarmele, L'Aquila, Italy
- Citizenship: Canadian; European (Italian)
- Education: McGill University (BA); University of London (MPhil); McMaster University Medical School (MD); European Graduate School (PhD)
- Known for: A Stranger in the Family: Culture, Families, and Therapy (1997); Social psychiatry
- Spouses: Vittoria Rita Lopez, Canadian educator (m. 1983; div. 2002); Letícia Castagna Lovato, Brazilian psychologist (m. 2014)
- Children: Carlo Dante, Nina Mara, and Anita Sofia
- Scientific career
- Fields: Clinical psychology
- Workplaces: University of Ottawa; Queen's University; Université de Montréal; McGill University; George Washington University; Harvard Medical School
- Thesis: Trauma and Event: A Philosophical Archaeology (2012)
- Doctoral advisor: Alain Badiou
- Other academic advisors: Ronald Melzack, Ray Hodgson, Joel Elkes, Raymond Prince, William Yule, Richard Mollica, Martin Hielscher, Giorgio Agamben
- Website: https://www.researchgate.net/profile/Vincenzo_Di_Nicola3

Vincenzo Di Nicola is an Italian-Canadian psychologist, psychiatrist and family therapist, and philosopher of mind.

Di Nicola is a tenured Full Professor in the Dept. of Psychiatry & Addiction Medicine at the University of Montreal, where he founded and directs the postgraduate course on Psychiatry and the Humanities, and Clinical Professor in the Dept. of Psychiatry and Behavioral Sciences at The George Washington University, where he gave The 4th Annual Stokes Endowment Lecture in 2013. He has taught in the Global Mental Health Faculty of the Harvard Program in Refugee Trauma affiliated with Harvard Medical School. In 2001, Di Nicola was made Professor, Honoris Causa, of Faculdades Integradas do Oeste de Minas (FADOM) in Minas Gerais, Brazil. Di Nicola was bestowed the Honorary Chair (Hon LD - Licentia Docendi) of Social Psychiatry and conferred the academic title of Honorary Professor (Hon MA Sc - Magister Scientiae ad Honorem) at the Milan School of Medicine of the Università Ambrosiana in 2021 for his contributions to the field of social psychiatry.

== Education ==
Di Nicola trained in psychology, medicine and psychiatry, and in philosophy: with a BA (First Class Honours) in Psychology from McGill University (1976), MPhil in Clinical Psychology, Institute of Psychiatry, University of London (1978), MD from McMaster University (1981), Diploma in Psychiatry from McGill University (1986), and later in his career, with a PhD (Summa Cum Laude) in Philosophy from the European Graduate School (2012). In recent interviews with his medical alma mater (McMaster) and the Université de Montréal where he teaches, Di Nicola traced the origins of his dual career in medicine and philosophy to his working class roots growing up in Hamilton, Ontario, where his mother was a housekeeper for McMaster University professors in two departments - psychiatry and philosophy.

== Work ==
Di Nicola's career has shown several foci, examining children, families and culture in various combinations.

Di Nicola is a collaborating partner of the Collaborating Centre for Values-based Practice in Health and Social Care at St. Catherine's College, Oxford University where he participated in the Advanced Studies Seminar dedicated to his work on cultural aspects of eating disorders. In 2019, he founded and was elected President of the Canadian Association of Social Psychiatry (CASP) and was made an Honorary Fellow of the World Association of Social Psychiatry (WASP), of which he was President-Elect (2019–22) and is now President (2022–25).

Di Nicola is the author of several books, including A Stranger in the Family: Culture, Families, and Therapy, integrating family therapy and cultural psychiatry to create cultural family therapy, and Letters to a Young Therapist: Relational Practices for the Coming Community, an overview of principles of relational psychology and therapy, and co-author, with Drozdstoj Stoyanov, of Psychiatry in Crisis: At the Crossroads of Social Sciences, the Humanities, and Neuroscience, an investigation into the history, theoretical bases and current practices of psychiatry in order to situate, understand and resolve its epistemological and ontological crises.

=== Cultural family therapy ===
His approach to working with families across cultures brought together a new synthesis of family therapy and transcultural psychiatry. Critical reviews were positive and encouraging by leaders in family therapy, such as Mara Selvini Palazzoli and Celia Jaes Falicov, as well as those in transcultural psychiatry, such as Armando Favazza. When his work was collected into his model of cultural family therapy in A Stranger in the Family in 1997, it was received as an important contribution to working with immigrant families. A Brazilian edition in Portuguese translation appeared in 1998. Di Nicola continued to elaborate his model of cultural family therapy in articles, chapters, a follow-up volume, Letters to a Young Therapist: Relational Practices for the Coming Community, as well as invitations to present the 4th Annual Stokes Endowment Lecture in family studies at The George Washington University and a thirty-year perspective on his model presented at McGill University where he first developed it and the Accademia di Psicoterapia della Famiglia in Rome, Italy where Di Nicola's model is taught. Di Nicola co-founded and co-chairs Family & Culture special interest groups with the Society for the Study of Psychiatry & Culture (SSPC) and the World Association of Cultural Psychiatry (WACP) which awarded him the 2022 WACP Creative Education Award in Cultural Psychiatry.

=== Social and cultural psychiatry ===
Another example of integration was the merging of child psychiatry and transcultural research to create the new area of transcultural child psychiatry. He was the plenary speaker at a conference on transcultural difficulties in child psychiatry, which was held at McGill University, a pioneering research center in transcultural psychiatry, and the proceedings were published (Sayegh et al., 1992).

Di Nicola's work on eating disorders called for a new historical and cultural view of what he called "anorexia multiforme," a form of suffering that is a cultural chameleon, expressing itself differently in different times, cultures and places.

A major area of Di Nicola's academic activity is in Social psychiatry, focused on the social determinants of health and mental health, his manifesto for social psychiatry, outlining the history, current state and future prospects of Social psychiatry, and his essay on the sociopolitical notion of the Global South as a bridge between globalization and the global mental health (GMH) movement that offers an emergent apparatus or conceptual tool for social psychiatry.

=== Interface between philosophy and psychiatry ===
Di Nicola's work also focuses on the interface between philosophy and psychiatry, addressing philosophical issues, ranging from the rights of children, to employing Giorgio Agamben's "state of exception" in definitions of human being and in trauma studies and Alain Badiou's "event" in his work on Trauma and Event, announcing a Psychiatry of the Event and a manifesto for Slow Thought in the spirit of the Slow Movement, to an ontological analysis of the crisis in psychiatry:

- "Review-essay: On the rights and philosophy of children"
- "States of exception, states of dissociation: Cyranoids, zombies and liminal people - An essay on the threshold between the human and the inhuman"
- "Where the exception becomes the norm — At the juncture of culture, trauma and psychiatry: Applying Agamben’s 'state of exception' to trauma studies and cultural competence"
- "Badiou, the Event, and Psychiatry, Part 1: Trauma and Event"
- "Badiou, the Event, and Psychiatry, Part 2: Psychiatry of the Event"
- "Two Trauma Communities: A Philosophical Archaeology of Cultural and Clinical Trauma Theories"
- "Take Your Time: The Seven Pillars of a Slow Thought Manifesto" See: "Thought (Philosophy)" section in: Slow movement (culture)
- "Editorial - 'Crisis? What Crisis?' The Crisis of Psychiatry Is a Crisis of Being"
- Psychiatry in Crisis: At the Crossroads of Social Sciences, the Humanities, and Neuroscience is a more comprehensive treatment of psychiatry's foundational problems, where the two co-authors, Di Nicola and Stoyanov, propose the key leitmotifs of epistemology (knowledge) or ontology (being) as the basis for psychiatry's current crisis.

=== Convergence: Social philosophy ===
Weaving together his three "allied projects" – Slow Thought, Evental Psychiatry, and the Global South - Di Nicola speaks of a convergence of his work in a recent interview. Slow Thought is a prologue to Evental Psychiatry which is his main project to "sketch out what a psychiatry of the Event would look like." The Global South is the conceptual geography articulated in Boaventura de Sousa Santos' "southern epistemologies" to rally around a new focus for theory and practice.

"So," Di Nicola concludes, "if Slow Thought is the path, and the Event is the process, the Global South is the place where we will arrive. And if I had to give one name to all my activities, integrating my roles as a social psychiatrist with my calls for Slow Thought and the Event, I would call that social philosophy" (emphasis added).

== Awards ==
Di Nicola was the recipient of the Camille Laurin Prize from the Fédération des médecins spécialistes du Québec. He was made a Fellow of the American Psychiatric Association (APA) in 2011 and Distinguished Fellow of the APA in 2017; in 2022, he was given the Distinguished Service Award of the APA and made a Distinguished Life Fellow for a combination of distinguished achievements and life service to the APA. Di Nicola's work as a child psychiatrist was recognized by the two North American academies in his field: in 2018, the American Academy of Child & Adolescent Psychiatry (AACAP) awarded Di Nicola the AACAP Jeanne Spurlock, MD, Lecture and Award on Diversity and Culture for which he gave the lecture, “Borders and Belonging, Culture and Community: From Adversity to Diversity in Transcultural Child and Family Psychiatry;" and the Canadian Academy of Child & Adolescent Psychiatry (CACAP) awarded him the 2021 Naomi Rae Grant Award for "creative, innovative, seminal work on ... community intervention, consultation, or prevention." Furthermore, Di Nicola was made a Fellow of the Canadian Psychiatric Association (FCPA) in 2020, Distinguished Fellow (DFCPA) in 2022, and elected by his peers as a Fellow of the Canadian Academy of Health Sciences (CAHS) in 2021, the highest honour granted to health sciences scholars in Canada.

== Bibliography ==
=== Books ===
- The Myth of Atlas: Families and the Therapeutic Story (Editor and translator; Routledge, 1989), ISBN 0876305494
- Families That Abuse (Foreword; W.W. Norton, 1992), ISBN 0393701220
- A Stranger in the Family: Culture, Families, and Therapy (W.W. Norton, 1997), ISBN 0393702286
- Um Estranho na Família: Cultura, Famílias e Terapia (Artmed, 1998, trans. by Maria Adriana Veríssimo Veronese), ISBN 9788573074642
- Letters to a Young Therapist: Relational Practices for the Coming Community (Atropos, 2011), ISBN 0983173451
- The Unsecured Present: 3-Day Novels & Pomes 4 Pilgrims (Atropos, 2012), ISBN 978-0-9853042-7-0
- Psychiatry in Crisis: At the Crossroads of Social Sciences, the Humanities, and Neuroscience (Springer, 2021) ISBN 978-3-030-55139-1 eBook ISBN 978-3-030-55140-7

=== Selected articles, essays, monographs ===
- Solyom, L.; DiNicola, V.F.; Sookman, D.; Luchins, D. (1985). "Is there an obsessive psychosis? Aetiological and prognostic factors of an atypical form of obsessive compulsive neurosis". Canadian Journal of Psychiatry. 30 (5): 372–380. doi:10.1177/070674378503000515. PMID 4027863. S2CID 7965411.
- Sigal, J.J.; DiNicola, V.F.; Buonvino, M. (1988). "Grandchildren of survivors: Can negative effects of prolonged exposure to excessive stress be observed two generations later?". Canadian Journal of Psychiatry. 33 (3): 207–212. doi:10.1177/070674378803300309. PMID 3383096. S2CID 20426543.
- DiNicola, V.F. (1985). "Family Therapy and Transcultural Psychiatry: An Emerging Synthesis. Part I: The Conceptual Basis". Transcultural Psychiatry. 22 (2): 81–113. doi:10.1177/136346158502200201. S2CID 144073186.
- DiNicola, V.F. (1985). "Family Therapy and Transcultural Psychiatry: An Emerging Synthesis. Part II: Portability and Culture Change". Transcultural Psychiatry. 22 (3): 151–180. doi:10.1177/136346158502200301. S2CID 144756928.
- DiNicola, V.F. (1986). "Beyond Babel: Family therapy as Cultural Translation". International Journal of Family Psychiatry. 7 (2): 179–191. doi:10.1177/136346159002700301. S2CID 143969500.
- Simeon, J.; DiNicola, V.F.; Ferguson, H.B.; Copping, W. (1990). "Adolescent depression: A placebo controlled fluoxetine treatment study and follow up". Progress in Neuro-Psychopharmacology and Biological Psychiatry. 14 (5): 791–795. doi:10.1016/0278-5846(90)90050-q. PMID 2293257. S2CID 24777155.
- DiNicola, V.F. (1990). "Anorexia Multiforme: Self-Starvation in Historical and Cultural Context. Part I: Self-starvation as a Historical Chameleon". Transcultural Psychiatry. 27 (3): 165–196. doi:10.1177/136346159002700301. S2CID 143969500.
- DiNicola, V.F. (1990). "Anorexia Multiforme: Self-Starvation in Historical and Cultural Context. Part II: Anorexia Nervosa as a Culture-Reactive Syndrome". Transcultural Psychiatry. 27 (4): 245–286. doi:10.1177/136346159002700401. S2CID 144566470.
- Di Nicola, V. (2018). "Borders and Belonging, Culture and Community: From Adversity to Diversity in Transcultural Child and Family Psychiatry". Journal of the American Academy of Child & Adolescent Psychiatry. 57 (10): S116. doi:10.1016/j.jaac.2018.09.013. S2CID 240089105.
- Di Nicola, Vincenzo (2023). ""A Person is a Person Through Other Persons"". In Gogineni, Rama Rao; Pumariega, Andres J.; Kallivayalil, Roy A.; Kastrup, Marianne; Rothe, Eugenio M. (eds.). The WASP Textbook on Social Psychiatry. pp. 44–C5P256. doi:10.1093/med/9780197521359.003.0005. ISBN 978-0-19-752135-9.
- Di Nicola, V. (2020). "Editorial: "Crisis? What crisis?" The crisis of psychiatry is a crisis of being". Bulgarian Journal of Mental Health. 1 (1): 4–10.
- Di Nicola, V. (2020). "The Global South: An Emergent Epistemology for Social Psychiatry". World Social Psychiatry. 2 (1): 20–26. doi:10.4103/WSP.WSP_1_20.
- Di Nicola, Vincenzo (2022-05-01). "Beyond Shared Care in Child and Adolescent Psychiatry: Collaborative Care and Community Consultations". World Social Psychiatry. 4 (2): 78. doi:10.4103/wsp.wsp_19_22. ISSN 2667-1077.

=== Interviews/career overviews ===
- Brazilian bilingual (English-Portuguese) interview with career overview of cultural family therapy, social and cultural psychiatry, and philosophy
- Italian interview/overview of contributions to family therapy and child psychiatry
- Interview on Di Nicola's book Psychiatry in Crisis and the philosophy of psychiatry with the American Philosophical Association: "The Crisis of Psychiatry Is a Crisis of Being: An Interview with Vincenzo Di Nicola"
- Interview with Ayurdhi Dhar on Psychiatry in Crisis and "Slow Psychiatry" for the Spotlight Interview: Rethinking Mental Health series: “The Crisis in Psychiatry and the Slow Way Back: Interview with Vincenzo Di Nicola,” Mad in America: Science, Psychiatry and Social Justice.
- Daniel Tutt (Interviewer), “Psychiatry Today: An Interview with Vincenzo Di Nicola,” Jouissance Vampires podcast and Study Group on Psychoanalysis and Politics, Dialogues on Theory.
- Marcos de Noronha (Interviewer), "Entrevista: Dr. Vincenzo Di Nicola, Psiquiatra Italiano" (Interview: Dr. Vincenzo Di Nicola, Italian Psychiatrrist), "Psiquiatria Sem Fronteiras" (Psychiatry Without Borders) Series. On Youtube in Portuguese.
