= Jesper Juul =

Jesper Juul may refer to:

- Jesper Juul (family therapist)
- Jesper Juul (game researcher)
