= Systemic hypothesising =

Systemic hypothesising (also referred to as systemic consultation) is a branch of psychology and Systemic therapy that works with behaviour practitioners and other allied health professionals to reflect upon the interpersonal and relational dynamics that may be inhibiting positive behaviour change efforts in people with an intellectual disability or other neurodivergent conditions.

Systemic hypothesising provides an opportunity for behaviour practitioners, psychologists, School counsellors and others such as case managers working with individuals with severe and complex challenging behaviours to reflect on interpersonal and relational dynamics as factors inhibiting positive change. This approach, draws from family systems therapy a model that is gaining some acceptance within the field of intellectual disability, has the potential to augment behaviour support, nurture change and development, enabling practitioners to understand and negotiate problematic interpersonal dynamics when responding to behavioural difficulties. Systemic consultation, in a similar fashion to family therapy tends to view change in terms of the system of interaction between all members of the support environment. The aim of Systemic Hypothesising is to assist the practitioner working with challenging behaviour to develop hypothesise regarding interactional and systemic restraints to effective behavioural intervention. This may be carried out as a part of the assessment phase therapy

== History and theoretical frameworks ==
In recent years there has been an increasing recognition of the critical role of relationships, including family relationships as well as those between clients and carers in the maintenance and amelioration of challenging behaviour, as well as in attempts to integrate the fields of family therapy and applied behaviour analysis. The treatment of challenging behaviour in intellectual disabilities has at the same time evolved dramatically since the 1950s, from a reliance on psychopharmacological restraint and operant conditioning to a multifaceted support plan that recognises the communicative intent of the client alongside their need for meaningful community participation. Relationship of familiar positive behavior support approaches to systemic consultation is the integration of the functional-ecological approach challenging behaviour, drawn upon applied behavior analysis and grounded in ideas of learning, person-centered values, inclusion, and multi-element frameworks therapy with the constructs of family therapy. Whilst systemic consultation is in its infancy (less than two decades) the theoretical precepts and skills of systemic family therapy provide the potential to significantly enhance the effectiveness of behavioural practice. A key limitation of applied behaviour analysis is its failure to adequately consider the complexities of familial (and other important individuals in the client’s word including carers, case workers, teachers, etc) relationships as they do not sufficiently differentiate between employed professionals and family members.

== Techniques ==
The consultation commences with a practitioner providing a rationale for the presenting behaviours or problems also known as sequences. These sequences are manifestations of recurrent patterns of interaction that are sometimes guided by the beliefs of family members. The practitioner is invited to present the case by illustrating first stakeholder group in Sociogram, genogram (and less often augmented with Systograms.) The reflecting team inquire about demographic information as the consultation progresses. The team speculate about the nature of relationships mindful that they can have a more qualitative nature and can involve different degrees of closeness, intimacy, compatibility, hostility, dependence, enmeshment, and so on. Another potentially useful line to speculate about events that might provide a context for the onset of the challenging behaviour, or the onset of its intensification as well as the exploration of other settings follows the same format as above. A genogram is replaced by simple organizational charts outlining the key players. Managers, school principals and medical practitioners might be represented at the top of the various hierarchies. The final step involves asking the practitioner to sit outside the reflective team and listens/observes a conversation between them. One of the members of the reflecting team prompts the group to share their thoughts with the aim of easing any anxiety and emphasizing the noncritical and affirming intentions of the group.
