= Edwin Friedman =

American rabbi and family therapist (1932-1996)

Edwin Friedman

Edwin Howard Friedman (May 17, 1932 – October 31, 1996) was an ordained rabbi, family therapist, and leadership consultant. He was born in New York City and worked for more than 35 years in the Washington, D.C., area, where he founded the Bethesda Jewish Congregation. His primary areas of work were in family therapy, congregational leadership (both Christian and Jewish), and leadership more generally.

== Approach ==
Friedman's approach was primarily shaped by an understanding of family systems theory. His seminal work Generation to Generation, written for the leaders of religious congregations, focused on leaders developing three main areas of themselves:

- Being self differentiated
- Being non-anxious
- Being present with those one is leading

His contribution to intercultural communication and understanding in family therapy appears in a key essay, "The Myth of the Shiksa" (original 1982, collected 2008), using the concept of "cultural costume and camouflage" to describe the ways that people express their ethnic or cultural identity. This was elaborated in greater detail in the model of cultural family therapy in "Chapter 3: The Presenting Culture" of A Stranger in the Family by family therapist and transcultural psychiatrist Vincenzo Di Nicola. Echoing cultural anthropologist Clifford Geertz's notion that humans exist through the mediating variable of culture, this model of cultural family therapy uses cultural costume and camouflage as a conceptual tool that Di Nicola calls Masks: "Each family, Friedman observed, draws its cultural camouflage from the available reportoire of their culture."

== Self-differentiation ==
Building on his work, Generation to Generation, Friedman's family and friends published A Failure of Nerve--leadership in the age of the quick fix finishing Friedman's work on his understanding of leaders as "self-differentiated or well-differentiated."

Friedman illustrates good “self-differentiated” leadership to that present in the great Renaissance explorers, where leaders had:

- the capacity to separate oneself from surrounding emotional processes
- the capacity to obtain clarity about one’s principles and vision
- the willingness to be exposed and be vulnerable
- the persistence to face inertial resistance
- the self-regulation of emotions in the face of reactive sabotage.

Two concepts are critical in Friedman’s model: self-knowledge and self-control. Friedman attacks what he calls the failure of nerve in leaders who are “highly anxious risk-avoiders,” more concerned with good feelings than with progress–one whose life revolves around the axis of consensus. By self-differentiation, the leader maintains his/her integrity (a non-anxious self as opposed to an anxious non-self) and thus promotes “the integrity or prevents the dis-integration of the system he or she is leading."

In other places, Friedman argues that the well-differentiated leader:

...is not an autocrat who tells others what to do or orders them around, although any leader who defines himself or herself clearly may be perceived that way by those who are not taking responsibility for their own emotional being and destiny... is someone who has clarity about his or her own life goals, and, therefore, someone who is less likely to become lost in the anxious emotional processes swirling about.... is someone who can separate while still remaining connected, and therefore can maintain a modifying, non-anxious, and sometimes challenging presence... is someone who can manage his or her own reactivity to the automatic reactivity of others, and therefore be able to take stands at the risk of displeasing.

== Bibliography ==
- Generation to Generation: Family Process in Church and Synagogue (New York: Guilford Press, 1985) ISBN 978-1-60918-236-6
- Friedman's Fables (New York: Guilford Press, 1990) ISBN 978-0-89862-440-3
- A Failure of Nerve: Leadership in the Age of the Quick Fix (New York: Seabury, 1997) - posthumous ISBN 978-1-59627-042-8
- The Myth of the Shiksa and Other Essays (New York: Seabury, 2008) ISBN 978-1-59627-077-0
- What Are You Going to Do with Your Life? Unpublished Writings and Diaries (New York: Seabury, 2009) ISBN 978-1-59627-114-2
- A Failure of Nerve: Leadership in the Age of the Quick Fix, Revised, 10th Anniversary Edition (New York: Church Publishing, 2017) - posthumous ISBN 978-1-59627-279-8
- A Failure Nerve in 52 Weeks: A Yearlong Leadership Planner (New York: Morehouse Publishing, 2023) ISBN 978-1-64065-652-9

== DVD ==
- Reinventing Leadership (New York: Guilford, 2007)

== See also ==
- Murray Bowen
