= Carl Whitaker =

American physician (1912–1995)

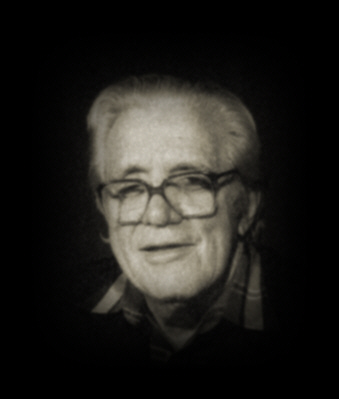
Carl Whitaker, M.D.

Carl Alanson Whitaker (1912–1995) was an American physician and psychotherapy pioneer family therapist.

"Carl Whitaker was one of the founding generation of family therapists who broke the rules of the psychotherapeutic orthodoxies of the time, such as that therapy focused on a single client and was totally divorced from family life," said Richard Simon, editor of The Family Therapy Networker, a leading publication in the field. "His idea was that the entire family was the client." Dr. Whitaker, known for his charm and charismatic manner, was one of the most powerful voices in shaping the practice of family therapy as it began to develop in the 1960s. Often provocative in his teaching, he told one interviewer, "Every marriage is a battle between two families struggling to reproduce themselves."

== Background ==
Whitaker was a native of Syracuse, NY, where he attended high school, university, and medical school. Whitaker received his M.D. from Syracuse University in 1936. After a residency in obstetrics and gynecology, Whitaker began to work in 1938 in a psychiatric hospital, and soon became fascinated by the challenge of treating people with schizophrenia. Observing that some patients seemed to recover only to have their problems re-emerge when they returned to their families, Whitaker began to focus on treating the whole family rather than the one patient.

He is credited for the co-development of the symbolic-experiential approach to therapy and the use of co-therapists, which came about during World War II as he counseled workers in Oak Ridge, Tenn., where a top-secret atomic bomb project was under way.

Whitaker referred to his work as "therapy of the absurd," highlighting the unconventional and playful wisdom he used to help transform family. Relying almost entirely on emotional logic rather than cognitive logic, his work is often misunderstood as nonsense, but it is more accurate to say that he worked with "heart sense." Rather than intervene on behavioral sequences like strategic-systemic therapists, Whitaker focused on the emotional process and family structure. He intervened directly at the emotional level of the system, relying heavily on "symbolism" and real life experiences as well as humor, play, and affective confrontation.

For the astute observer, Whitaker's work embodied a deep and profound understanding of families' emotional lives; to the casual observer, he often seemed rude or inappropriate. When he was "inappropriate," it was always for the purpose of confronting or otherwise intervening on emotional dynamics that he wanted to expose, challenge, and transform. He was adamant about balancing strong emotional confrontation with warmth and support from the therapist. In many ways, he encouraged therapists to move beyond the rules of polite society and invite all participants to be genuine and real enough to speak the whole truth.

== Career ==
From 1946 Whitaker served as Chairman of the Department of Psychiatry at Emory University, where he focused on treating people with schizophrenia and their families. He became a professor of psychiatry at the University of Wisconsin–Madison in 1965 until his retirement in 1982. During his tenure at the University of Wisconsin University of Wisconsin–Madison, he refined and articulated his ideas about psychotherapy, which he coined symbolic-experiential family therapy, and his national influence on the emerging field grew stronger.

A number of Whitaker's ideas about family therapy are presented in The Family Crucible, written with Dr. Augustus Napier in 1978, which became a highly influential work in the field. In 1982 Whitaker's major articles on family therapy were collected in From Psyche to System edited by John R. Neill and David Kniskern.

After his retirement Whitaker continued to teach and lecture widely, and he and his wife, Muriel Schram Whitaker, consulted with and supervised family therapists around the world. His last book, Midnight Musings of a Family Therapist, was published in 1988 by W. W. Norton.

== See also ==
- Virginia Satir
- Family therapy

== Bibliography ==
- Whitaker, C.A. & Malone, T.P. (1953). The Roots of Psychotherapy. New York: Blakiston.
- Whitaker, C.A. (1975; 1999). The Symptomatic Adolescent – an AWOL Family Member, in M. Sugar (Ed.) The Adolescent in Group and Family Therapy. New York: Brunner/Mazel. (2nd Edition, New Jersey: Jason Aronson).
- Whitaker, C.A. (1976). The Technique of Family Therapy. In G.P. Sholevar (Ed.)(1977). Changing sexual values and the family. Springfield, Ill: Charles Thomas.
- Napier, A.Y. & Whitaker, C.A. (1978; 1988). The Family Crucible. New York: Harper & Row.
- Neil, J. & Kniskern, D. (1982). From psyche to system: The evolving therapy of Carl Whitaker. New York: Guilford Press.
- Whitaker, C.A. & Bumberry, W.A. (1988). Dancing With the Family: A Symbolic-experiential Approach. New York: Brunner/Mazel.
- Whitaker C.A. (1989). Midnight Musings of a Family Therapist. New York: WW Norton.
