= Family Environment Scale =

The Family Environment Scale (FES) was developed and is used to measure social and environmental characteristics of families. It can be used in several ways, in family counseling and psychotherapy, to teach program evaluators about family systems, and in program evaluation.

== Scale inventory ==
The scale is a 90-item inventory that has 10 subscales measuring interpersonal Relationship dimension, the Personal Growth, and the System Maintenance. The Relationship dimension includes measurements of cohesion, expressiveness, and conflict. Cohesion is the degree of commitment and support family members provide for one another, expressiveness is the extent to family members are encouraged to express their feelings directly, and conflict is the amount of openly expressed anger and conflict among family members.

Five subscales refer to Personal Growth: independence, achievement orientation, intellectual-cultural orientation, active-recreational orientation, and moral-religious emphasis. Independence assesses the extent to which family members are assertive, self-sufficient and make their own decisions. Achievement Orientation reflects how much activities are cast into an achievement oriented or competitive framework. Intellectual-cultural orientation measures the level of interest in political, intellectual, and cultural activities. Active-recreational orientation measures the amount of participation in social and recreational activities. Moral-religious emphasis assesses the emphasis on ethical and religious issues and values.

The final two subscales, organization and control, are for System Maintenance. These measure how much planning is put into family activities and responsibilities and how much set rules and procedures are used to run family life.

There are three, equivalent forms to the FES that are used to measure different aspects of the family. The Real Form (Form R) measures people's attitude about their family current environment, the Ideal Form (Form I) measures person's ideal family perception, and the Expectations Form (Form E) assesses the family ability to withstand change.

After approximately 20 minutes, the test is completed and ten scores are derived from the subscales to create an overall profile of the family environment. Based on these scores, families are then grouped into one of three family environment typologies based on their most salient characteristics. The Family Environment Scale gives counselors and researchers a way of examining each family member’s perceptions of the family in those three categories. This also helps capture perception of the family's functioning from one of its own members.

== Reliability and validity of FES ==
Reliability estimates for subscales measurements are consistent, test-retest intervals are significant, and the validity of this scale is supported by evidence. There is no proof though that officially states that the ten subscales of the FES are independent because there has not been an analysis completed on this.
