= Jesper Juul (family therapist) =

Danish therapist and author (1948–2019)

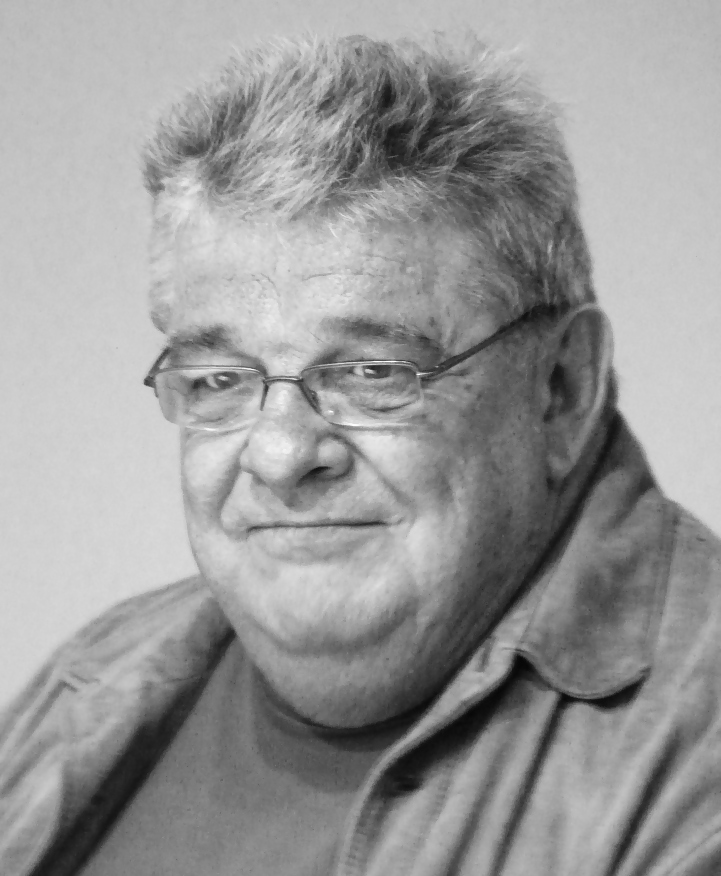
- Born: 18 April 1948; Vordingborg, Denmark
- Died: 25 July 2019 (aged 71); Odder, Denmark
- Education: University of Aarhus
- Occupations: Family therapist, Author

Jesper Juul (18 April 1948 – 25 July 2019) was a Danish family therapist and author of several books on parenting to a general audience. In his book Your Competent Child (1995, in English 2001) he argues that today's families are at an exciting crossroads because the destructive values — obedience, physical and emotional violence, and conformity — that governed traditional hierarchical families are being transformed. The book has been translated into 13 languages and has popularized current ideas of non-authoritarian parenting.

== Biography ==
Jesper Juul was born in Vordingborg, Denmark. He had several jobs before entering higher education at Marselisborg Seminarium where he graduated as a teacher of history and religion in 1970. He then enrolled in studies of the history of ideas at the University of Aarhus. He financed his studies working at the resort Bøgholt in Viby J, and dropped out of studies to work full-time with social treatment. At an internal course he became acquainted with U.S. psychiatrist Walter Kempler and they became friends, finally leading to him forming the Kempler Institute of Scandinavia in 1979 with Kempler as a director. A few years later Juul had to take over leadership of the institute and would hold this position until 2004. He has no peer-reviewed scientific articles listed in the American psychological database PsycINFO, however his books have been cited numerous times in academic publications.

Juul's first marriage, which lasted from 1971 to 1990, produced one child. His second marriage ended in divorce in 2014.

Juul died in his home in Odder on 25 July 2019 as a result of a lung infection.

== Bibliography (published in English) ==
- Juul, Jesper (2001). Your Competent Child - Towards New Basic Values for the Family. Farrar, Straus & Giroux, N.Y. ISBN 0-374-52790-3.
- Juul, Jesper. NO! - The art of saying NO! With a clear conscience. Translated and edited by Haye van der Meer.
- Juul, Jesper. Here I am! Who are you? - Resolving conflicts between adults and children. Translated and edited by Haye van der Meer.
- Juul, Jesper. Family Life - The most important values for living together and raising children. Translated and edited by Haye van der Meer.
- Juul, Jesper; Øien, Monica. Family Time.
