= Jay Haley =

American family therapist and author (1923 – 2007)

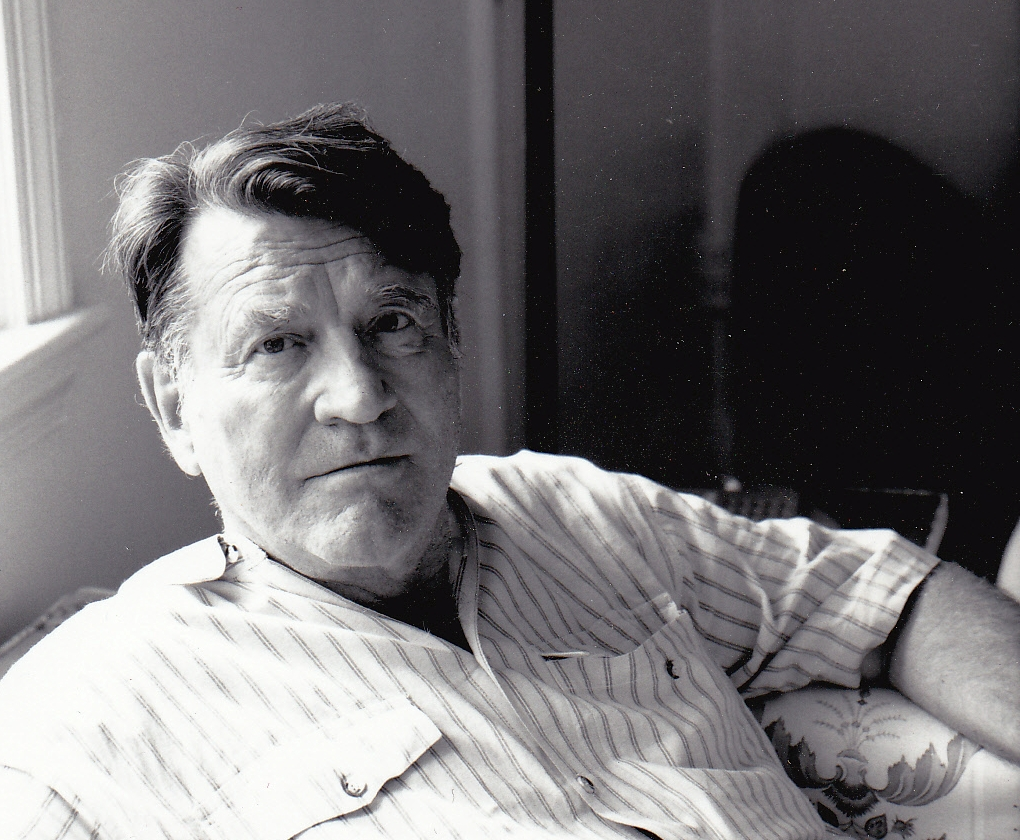
Jay Haley

Jay Douglas Haley (July 19, 1923 – February 13, 2007) was one of the founding figures of Problem-solving brief therapy and family therapy in general and of the strategic model of psychotherapy, and he was one of the more accomplished teachers, clinical supervisors, and authors in these disciplines.

== Life and works ==
Haley was born at his family's homestead in Midwest, Wyoming. His family moved to Berkeley, California, when he was four years old. After serving in the United States Army Air Forces during World War II, he attended UCLA where he received a BA in Theater Arts. During his undergraduate years, Haley published a short story in The New Yorker.

After a year spent in pursuit of a career as a playwright, he returned to California and received a Bachelor of Library Science degree from University of California at Berkeley and then a master's degree in communication from Stanford University. He was married for the first time in 1950 and had three children, Kathleen, Gregory, and Andrew, with his wife Elizabeth.

While at Stanford, Haley met the anthropologist Gregory Bateson who invited him to join a communications research project that later became known as The Bateson Project, a collaboration that became one of the driving factors in the creation of family therapy and that published the single most important paper in the history of family therapy, "Towards a Theory of Schizophrenia." The central members of this project were Gregory Bateson, Donald deAvila Jackson, Jay Haley, John Weakland, and Bill Fry.

In addition to his personal involvement in the birth and evolution of family therapy, Haley was an observational researcher of psychotherapy in the 1950s and early 1960s. The Bateson Project arranged for Jay and John Weakland to observe and record clinicians including Milton Erickson, Joseph Wolpe, John Rosen, Don Jackson, Charles Fulweiler, Frieda Fromm-Reichmann, and others.

In 1962, while working at the Mental Research Institute in Palo Alto, Haley became the founding editor of the family therapy journal Family Process (assisted by his first wife, Elizabeth Haley, an experienced journalist). While at MRI, Jay continued the professional relationship with Milton Erickson that had been established in the earliest years of the Bateson Project. Jay helped to introduce Erickson to the clinical public with such important books as Uncommon Therapy. Haley also worked closely with Salvador Minuchin, who developed Structural Family Therapy.

Haley moved to Philadelphia in the mid-1960s to take a position at the Philadelphia Child Guidance Clinic. Through his collaboration with Salvador Minuchin and Braulio Montalvo, he influenced (and was influenced by) the evolution of Structural Family Therapy in the early 1970s.

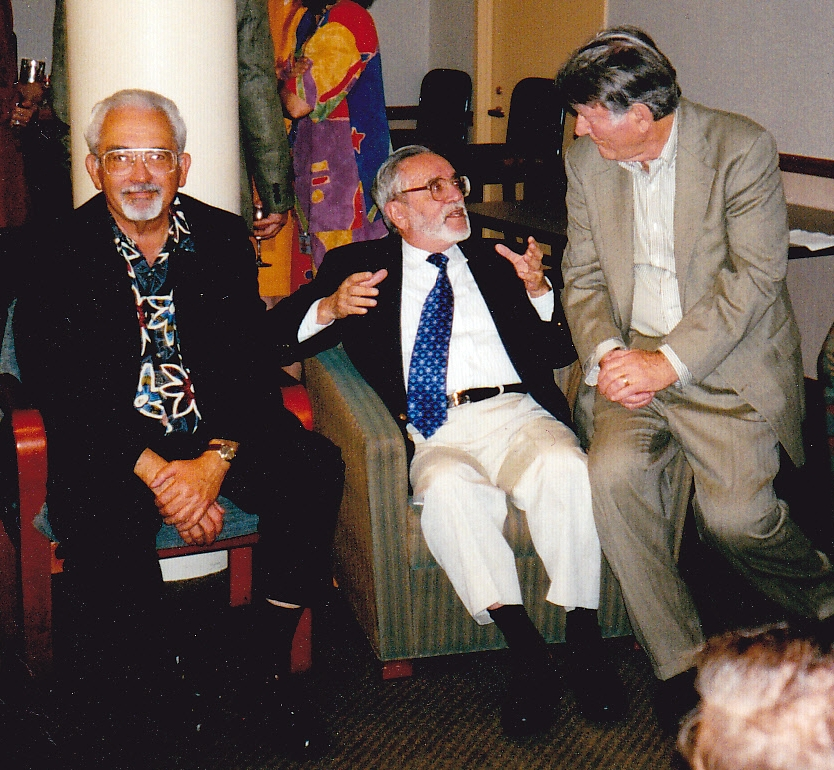
Braulio Montalvo, Salvador Minuchin, and Jay Haley

After founding the Family Therapy Institute of Washington, DC, with second wife Cloe Madanes in 1976, Haley continued to be a central force in the evolution of Strategic Family Therapy. His publications from the years at the Family Therapy Institute include one of the field's most influential best selling books, Problem Solving Therapy.

After leaving the Family Therapy Institute in the 1990s, Haley moved to the San Diego area and, in collaboration with his third wife Madeleine Richeport-Haley, produced a number of films relating to both anthropology and psychotherapy. Madeleine also collaborated in the writing of his final book, Directive Family Therapy. At the time of his death, he was also a Scholar In Residence at California School of Professional Psychology at Alliant International University.

Haley combined a systemic understanding of human problems and strengths with a pragmatic approach to intervention. His method of therapy — he claimed not to have a theory of therapy — emphasizes creative and sometimes provocative instructions to which clients react. The approach emphasizes careful contracting between clients and the therapist, experimenting with possible solutions (in a manner sometimes inspired by the therapist and sometimes inspired by the client), review of the results and informed resumption of experimentation until the goal of therapy is achieved. In the 1960s and 1970s when psychodynamic approaches to therapy dominated, such practicality was commonly seen as heretical. The here-and-now emphasis of Haley and others of his generation of pragmatic practitioners is now the norm for the field of psychotherapy.

== Haley's Strategic Therapy ==
Strategic Therapy is any type of therapy where the therapist initiates what happens during therapy and designs a particular approach for each problem. As Haley wrote in Uncommon Therapy: The Psychiatric Techniques Of Milton H. Erickson MD: "Strategic therapy isn't a particular approach or theory, but a name for the types of therapy where the therapist takes responsibility for directly influencing people" (p. 17).

Strategic family therapists may sometimes explore understanding ways in which a patient's symptoms might be viewed as benevolent attempts to deal with other family issues. This a variation of Don Jackson's view of symptoms as "love gone wrong." Haley's strategic therapy focuses on short-term, targeted efforts to solve a specific problem.

A therapist employing strategic therapy must:

- Identify solvable problems.
- Set goals.
- Design interventions to achieve those goals.
- Examine the responses.
- Examine the outcome of the therapy.

== Bibliography ==
=== By Haley ===
- Uncommon Therapy: The Psychiatric Techniques of Milton H. Erickson, M.D. (W.W. Norton 1973)
- The Art of Strategic Therapy
- The Power Tactics of Jesus Christ and Other Essays (Avon Books 1969)
- Strategies of Psychotherapy (Grune & Stratton 1963)
- Problem-Solving Therapy
- Ordeal Therapy: Unusual Ways to Change Behavior (Jossey-Bass 1984)
- Learning and Teaching Therapy (Guilford Press 1996)
- Directive Family Therapy (written with Madeleine Richeport-Haley)
- Leaving Home: The Therapy of Disturbed Young People, Second Edition. (Brunner/Routledge 1997) ISBN 978-0-87630-845-5

=== Coauthored ===
- Techniques of family therapy (written with Lynn Hoffman) (1967; 1994). New York: Basic Books. (1994 printing – Northvale, NJ: Aronson.)
- Changing Directives: The Strategic Therapy of Jay Haley (written with Jeffrey K. Zeig) (2001)

== See also ==
- Brief therapy
- Family therapy
