= Walter Kempler =

Walter Kempler was a psychotherapist and psychiatrist who co-founded the Kempler Institute.

Kempler was born in New York City on September 9, 1923. He earned his bachelor’s degree in 1946 and his MD in 1947 from the University of Texas.

Like many of the early family therapy theorists, psychoanalytic training was also the starting point for Walter Kempler; he later became interested in existential issues and family therapy. He worked for a time with Fritz Perls at the Esalen Institute in the 1960s. Kempler called his form of treatment, variously, Experiential or Gestalt family therapy. His focus was on the immediate, on feelings and desires that lie behind verbal and nonverbal messages, and on their clear and complete delivery. Kempler applied Gestalt Therapy on families and termed it experiential family therapy.

== The Kempler Institute ==
In 1979, the Kempler Institute was founded in Denmark by the American psychiatrist and family therapist Walter Kempler, MD, in collaboration with child psychiatrist Morgens A. Lund, Proff. Lis Keiser, and family therapist Jesper Juul, with the objective of developing a long-term postgraduate education in experiential family psychotherapy with families.

The general office was situated in Odense, and the Institute owns educational facilities in Odder, Copenhagen, and a conference center on Hjarnø, Denmark.

The Institute worked primarily in Denmark, Scandinavia, and other European and central European countries.
