= Identified patient =

Member of dysfunctional family

Identified patient (IP) is a clinical term often used in family therapy discussion. It describes one family member in a dysfunctional family who is used as an expression of the family's authentic inner conflicts. As a family system is dynamic, the overt symptoms of an identified patient draw attention away from the "elephants in the living room" no one can talk about which need to be discussed. If covert abuse occurs between family members, the overt symptoms can draw attention away from the perpetrators.

The identified patient is a kind of diversion and a kind of scapegoat. Often a child, this is "the split-off false carrier of a breakdown in the entire family system," which may be a transgenerational disturbance or trauma. While the concept has evolved beyond Jung's original interpretation, some modern authors still use the term to describe a family member who is blamed for the family's problems, even though all members experience mental illness, rather than the one officially labeled as mentally ill – positing that the IP may actually be the least troubled member of a dysfunctional family nexus.

== Origins and characteristics ==
The term emerged from the work of the Bateson Project on family homeostasis, as a way of identifying a largely unconscious pattern of behavior whereby an excess of painful feelings in a family lead to one member being identified as the cause of all the difficulties – a scapegoating of the IP.

The identified patient – also called the "symptom-bearer" or "presenting problem" – may display unexplainable emotional or physical symptoms, and is often the first person to seek help, perhaps at the request of the family. However, while family members will typically express concern over the IP's problems, they may instinctively react to any improvement on the identified patient's part by attempting to reinstate the status quo.

Virginia Satir, the wellspring of family systems theory, who knew Bateson, viewed the identified patient as a way of both concealing and revealing a family's secret agendas. Conjoint family therapy stressed accordingly the importance in group therapy of bringing not only the identified patient but the extended family in which their problems arose into the therapy – with the ultimate goal of relieving the IP of the broader family feelings they have been carrying. In such circumstances, not only the IP but their siblings as well may end up feeling the benefits.

R. D. Laing saw the IP as a function of the family nexus: "the person who gets diagnosed is part of a wider network of extremely disturbed and disturbing patterns of communication." Later formulations suggest that the patient may be an "emissary" of sorts from the family to the wider world, in an implicit familial call for help, as with the reading of juvenile delinquency as a coded cry for help by a child on their parents' behalf. There may then be an element of altruism in the IP's behavior – 'playing' sick to prevent worse things happening in the family, such as a total family breakdown.

== Examples ==
- In a family where the parents need to assert themselves as powerful figures and caretakers, often due to their own insecurities, they may designate one or more of their children as being inadequate, unconsciously assigning to the child the role of someone who cannot cope by themselves. For example, the child may exhibit some irrational problem requiring the constant care and attention of the parents.
- In Dibs in Search of Self, an account of a child therapy, Virginia Axline considered that perhaps the parents, "quite unconsciously...chose to see Dibs as a mental defective rather than as an intensified personification of their own emotional and social inadequacy".
- Gregory Bateson considered sometimes "the identified patient sacrifices himself to maintain the sacred illusion that what the parent says makes sense", and that "the identified patient exhibits behavior which is almost a caricature of that loss of identity which is characteristic of all the family members".

== Literary and biographical ==
- In the play The Family Reunion, T. S. Eliot writes of the protagonist: "It is possible You are the consciousness of your unhappy family, Its bird sent flying through the purgatorial flame".
- Carl Jung, who viewed individual neurosis as often deriving from whole family or social groups, considered himself a case in point: "I feel very strongly I am under the influence of things or questions left incomplete and unanswered by my parents and grandparents and more distant ancestors...an impersonal karma within a family, which is passed on from parents to children".

The term is also used in analyzing dysfunction in businesses where an individual becomes the carrier of a group problem.

== See also ==
- Dysfunctional family
- Fall guy
- Martti Olavi Siirala
- Münchausen syndrome by proxy
- Narcissistic parents
- Psychological projection
- Role suction
- Sacrificial lamb
- Scapegoating
