= Galactan 5-O-arabinofuranosyltransferase =

Class of enzymes

Identifiers
- EC no.: 2.4.2.46

Databases
- IntEnz: IntEnz view
- BRENDA: BRENDA entry
- ExPASy: NiceZyme view
- KEGG: KEGG entry
- MetaCyc: metabolic pathway
- PRIAM: profile
- PDB structures: RCSB PDB PDBe PDBsum
Search
- PMC: articles
- PubMed: articles
- NCBI: proteins

Galactan 5-O-arabinofuranosyltransferase (EC 2.4.2.46, AftA, Rv3792) is an enzyme with systematic name galactofuranan:trans,octacis-decaprenylphospho-beta-D-arabinofuranose 5-O-alpha-D-arabinofuranosyltransferase. This enzyme catalyses the following chemical reaction

Adds an alpha-D-arabinofuranosyl group from trans,octacis-decaprenylphospho-β-D-arabinofuranose at the 5-O-position of the eighth, tenth and twelfth galactofuranose unit of the galactofuranan chain of [beta-D-galactofuranosyl-(1->5)-beta-D-galactofuranosyl-(1->6)]14-beta-D-galactofuranosyl-(1->5)-beta-D-galactofuranosyl-(1->4)-alpha-L-rhamnopyranosyl-(1->3)-N-acetyl-alpha-D-glucosaminyl-diphospho-trans,octacis-decaprenol

This enzyme is isolated from Mycobacterium tuberculosis and Corynebacterium glutamicum.
