= ENRICH =

Questionnaire for married couples

ENRICH is a 125-item questionnaire for married couples that examines communication, conflict resolution, role relationship, financial management, expectations, sexual relationship, personality compatibility, marital satisfaction, and other personal beliefs related to marriage. It was developed by University of Minnesota family psychologist David Olson, Ph.D., and colleagues as a method of assessing the health of married couple relationships and is now used by over 100,000 facilitators in the United States and worldwide.

In studies of couples who completed the questionnaire, Fowers and Olson found ENRICH could predict divorce with 85% accuracy. Results from discriminant analysis indicated that using either the individual scores or couples' scores, happily married couples could be discriminated from unhappily married couples with 85-95% accuracy. A 2001 paper found sexual intimacy within relationships was positively associated with marital satisfaction.

== PREPARE/ENRICH ==
ENRICH has evolved into a complete online program called PREPARE/ENRICH, which also examines the beliefs of couples preparing to marry and provides couple exercises to build relationship skills. This new program helps couples with the following:

- Identify strength and growth areas
- Explore personality traits
- Strengthen communication skills
- Resolve conflicts and reduce stress
- Compare family backgrounds
- Comfortably discuss financial issues
- Establish personal, couple, and family goals
