= Lyman Wynne =

American psychiatrist (1923–2007)

- Born: September 17, 1923; Tyler, Minnesota
- Died: January 17, 2007 (Age: 83–84); Bethesda, Maryland
- Education: Harvard University
- Scientific career
- Fields: psychiatry, psychology, schizophrenia
- Workplaces: Wynne Center for Family Research, University of Rochester Medical Center

Lyman C. Wynne (1923–2007) was an American psychiatrist and psychologist with a special interest in schizophrenia. His early research helped lay the foundation for family-based therapies, influencing others such as R. D. Laing and Margaret Singer. He made a number of discoveries about the interaction of genetics and the environment in the development of schizophrenia, working with adopted twins. He published numerous articles and co-edited "The Nature of Schizophrenia" (1978), received the Frieda Fromm-Reichmann Award for schizophrenia research from the American Academy of Psychoanalysis in 1965, the Meritorious Service Medal from the U.S. Public Health Service in 1966, and received two awards from the American Family Therapy Academy, one in 1981 and another in 1989.

== Biography ==
Wynne was born into an impoverished but intellectual Danish family in a Southern Minnesota village. His mother died of uterine cancer when he was 11 years old, inspiring him to become a medical researcher. He was sent to live with an aunt and uncle in Duluth, Minnesota and later received a full scholarship to Harvard University.

He served as president of the American Family Therapy Academy in 1986 and 1987.

Wynne chaired the University of Rochester Medical Center’s Department of Psychiatry from 1971 to 1977, and then served as professor of psychiatry until his retirement to emeritus status in 1998. During the 1950s and 1960s, as a researcher and an official at the National Institute of Mental Health, Wynne pioneered new approaches to mental illness, especially schizophrenia.

“At a time when families of patients with schizophrenia were neglected by medical professionals, Wynne devoted his career to understanding them. He knew first hand about the devastating impact of mental illness upon families, losing a beloved sister to suicide early in his career. The experiences of his family fueled his determination to improve our treatment of schizophrenia, and gave him a deep empathy for those who are suffering.”

— J. Steven Lamberti, M.D, Associate Chair of Psychiatry, University of Rochester Medical Center

== Personal ==
Wynne was survived by five children, Christine Wynne of Lake Oswego, Oregon; Randy Wynne of Tampa, Florida; Sara Wynne of Oakland, California; Barry Wind of Bethesda, Maryland; and Jonathan Wynne of Brooklyn, New York; a sister, Nadine Tornquist of Minneapolis, Minnesota; and five grandchildren.
