= Families, Systems and Health =

- Discipline: Healthcare
- Language: English
- Edited by: Jodi Polaha and Nadiya Sunderji

Publication details
- Former name(s): Family Systems Medicine
- History: 1983–present
- Publisher: American Psychological Association on behalf of the Collaborative Family Healthcare Association (United States)
- Frequency: Quarterly
- Impact factor: 1.95 (2020)

Standard abbreviations
- ISO 4: Fam. Syst. Health

Indexing
- ISSN: 1091-7527 (print); 1939-0602 (web)
- OCLC no.: 312304129

Links
- Journal homepage; Online access

Families, Systems and Health is a peer-reviewed academic journal published by the American Psychological Association on behalf of the Collaborative Family Healthcare Association. It was established in 1983 and covers research in the areas of health systems, health care, and family science, especially integrated care. The current editors-in-chief are Jodi Polaha (East Tennessee State University ) and Nadiya Sunderji (University of Toronto).

== Abstracting and indexing ==
According to the Journal Citation Reports, the journal has a 2020 impact factor of 1.95.
