= Mental Research Institute =

Systemic and family therapy organization in Palo Alto, California, US

Coordinates: 37.45331°N 122.18484°W

The Palo Alto Mental Research Institute (MRI) is one of the founding institutions of brief and family therapy. Founded by Don D. Jackson and colleagues in 1959, MRI has been one of the leading sources of ideas in the area of interactional/systemic studies, psychotherapy, and family therapy.

== Overview ==
According to an article in the Psychotherapy Networker on Jay Haley (a Research Associate at MRI in the 1960s) MRI "became the go-to place for any therapist who wanted to be on the cutting edge of psychotherapy research and practice. Fostering a climate of almost untrammeled experimentalism, MRI started the first formal training program in family therapy, produced some of the seminal early papers and books in the field, and became a place where some of the field's leading figures - Paul Watzlawick, Richard Fisch, Jules Riskin, Virginia Satir, Salvador Minuchin, R.D. Laing, Irvin D. Yalom, Cloe Madanes - came to work or just hang out".

As of 1967, the Brief Therapy Center at MRI presented an innovative model for the comprehensive approach to brief psychotherapy, a model which, in turn, has influenced subsequent brief therapy approaches throughout the world. The Brief Therapy Center at MRI was founded by Dick Fisch, John Weakland, and Paul Watzlawick. Continuing applied research and theory development have expanded the use of interactional concepts to community, school and business. Thousands of professionals within the U.S. as well as from many countries of the world have attended MRI training programs.

== Mission statement ==
The Mental Research Institute (MRI), established in 1958 by Donald deAvila Jackson, is a small, independent, multi-disciplinary, non-profit corporation:

- devoted to conducting and encouraging scientific research based on new ways of looking at how people behave,
- dedicated to benefit the human community worldwide through training, clinical and consultative services
- committed to extending a tradition of innovation and openness towards new paradigms of change.

The focus of MRI is to explore and to encourage the use of an interactional approach to further understand and more effectively resolve human problems from the family to all other levels of social organization.

== Books on MRI ==
- The Interactional View: Studies at the Mental Research Institute, Palo Alto, 1965–1974, edited by Weakland, J., and Watzlawick, P. (1979) New York: WW Norton
- Propagations: Thirty years of Influence from the Mental Research Institute, Weakland, J., & Ray, W. (1995). New York: Haworth Press

The bibliography of associates of MRI lists over 1000 journal and book publications.

== See also ==
- LAPD Mental Evaluation Unit
- National Child Traumatic Stress Network
