= Transcultural Psychiatry =

- Discipline: Psychiatry Anthropology
- Language: English
- Edited by: Laurence J Kirmayer

Publication details
- History: 1956-present
- Publisher: SAGE Publications (United Kingdom)
- Frequency: Bimonthly
- Impact factor: 2.28 (2016)

Standard abbreviations
- ISO 4: Transcult. Psychiatry

Indexing
- ISSN: 1363-4615 (print); 1461-7471 (web)
- LCCN: 97643427
- OCLC no.: 36732161

Links
- Journal homepage; Online access; Online archive

Transcultural Psychiatry is a peer-reviewed academic journal that publishes papers in the fields of cultural psychiatry, psychology and anthropology. The journal's editor-in-chief is Laurence J. Kirmayer (McGill University). The Associate Editors are Renato Alarcón, Roland Littlewood and Leslie Swartz. It has been in publication since 1964 and is currently published by SAGE Publications on behalf of the Division of Social and Transcultural Psychiatry of McGill University. It is the official journal of the World Psychiatric Association Transcultural Psychiatry Section and is also published in association with the Society for the Study of Psychiatry and Culture.

== Scope ==
Transcultural Psychiatry focuses on the social and cultural determinants of psychopathology and psychosocial treatments of the range of mental and behavioural problems in individuals, families and communities. The journal also draws from the disciplines of psychiatric epidemiology, medical anthropology and cross-cultural psychology.

== Abstracting and indexing ==
Transcultural Psychiatry is abstracted and indexed in, among other databases: SCOPUS, and the Social Sciences Citation Index. According to the Journal Citation Reports, its 2014 impact factor is 2.114, ranking it 49 out of 133 journals in the category 'Psychiatry'. and 12 out of 83 journals in the category 'Anthropology'.
