= Murray Bowen =

American physician, family therapist, and academic (1913-1990)

Murray Bowen (/ˈboʊən/ BOH-ən; January 31, 1913, in Waverly, Tennessee – October 9, 1990) was an American psychiatrist and a professor in psychiatry at Georgetown University. Bowen was among the pioneers of family therapy and a noted founder of systemic therapy. Beginning in the 1950s he developed a systems theory of the family.

== Biography ==
Murray Bowen (Lucius Murray Bowen) was born in 1913 as the oldest of five and grew up in the small town of Waverly, Tennessee, where his father was the mayor for some time. Bowen earned his Bachelor of Science degree in 1934 at the University of Tennessee in Knoxville. He received his MD in 1937 at the Medical School of the University of Tennessee in Memphis. After that, he had internships at Bellevue Hospital in New York City in 1938 and at the Grasslands Hospital, Valhalla, New York, from 1939 to 1941. From 1941 to 1946, he did his military training followed by five years of active duty with Army in the United States and Europe. During the war, while working with soldiers, his interest changed from surgery to psychiatry. Though he had been accepted for a post-military fellowship in surgery at the Mayo Clinic, in 1946 he started at the Menninger Foundation in Topeka, Kansas, as a fellow in psychiatry and personal psychoanalysis. This psychiatric training and experience lasted until 1954.

From 1954 to 1959, Bowen worked at the National Institute of Mental Health, Bethesda, Maryland. He continued to develop the theory based in systematic therapy which viewed the family as an emotional unit, later known as Bowen Theory. At that time, family therapy was relatively new to the field of human services. Since the inception of Bowen Theory, it has been applied in several human services fields such as social services, education, and leadership development.

After defining the field of family therapy he started integrating new concepts with the theory, noting that none of this had previously been addressed in the psychological literature. The theory he developed is Bowen Family Systems Theory. His approach gained national attention within two years of its introduction.

Bowen did research on parents who lived with one adult schizophrenic child, which he thought could provide a paradigm for all children. From 1959 to 1990 he worked at the Georgetown University Medical Center in Washington DC as a clinical professor at the department of psychiatry, and later as director of family programs and founder of a Family Center. Bowen’s research focused on human interaction within the family "unit" or system. Bowen focused on the prodromal states that preceded a medical diagnosis. For Bowen, each concept was extended, and woven into physical, emotional, and social illness. Bowen criticized psychiatry’s penchant for diagnosing and treating mental illness as of limited usefulness and ultimately a dead end.

His colleagues have described him as having “an unrelenting conviction that theory is the most important foundation for psychiatry, family theory, and other practice fields.” During his time at Georgetown University, Bowen founded a Family Center in order to conduct his research. After his death in the 1990s, the center changed to the Bowen Center for the Study of the Family, a non-profit organization to carry on his legacy.

In addition to his research and teaching, Bowen had other faculty appointments and consultancies. He was visiting professor in a variety of medical schools, including at the University of Maryland from 1956 to 1963 and at the Medical College of Virginia at Richmond from 1964 to 1978. He was a life fellow at the American Psychiatric Association and at the American Orthopsychiatric Association, and a life member at the Group for the Advancement of Psychiatry. He was on the American Board of Psychiatry and Neurology in 1961 and first president at the American Family Therapy Association.

Murray Bowen received multiple awards and recognitions, including:

- 1978-1982, Originator and First President, American Family Therapy Association;
- 1985 June, Alumnus of the Year, Menninger Foundation;
- 1985 December, Faculty, Evolution of Psychotherapy Conference, Erickson Foundation, Phoenix;
- 1986 June, Graduation Speaker, Menninger School of Psychiatry;
- 1986, Governor's Certificate, Tennessee Homecoming ‘86, Knoxville;
- 1986 October, Distinguished Alumnus Award, University of Tennessee-Knoxville.

He died of pulmonary disease in 1990.

In November 2002, Bowen's papers were donated to the U.S. National Library of Medicine. The collection of 125 boxes is stored offsite.

== Family systems theory ==
Self-differentiation is a core concept within family systems theory, developed by Bowen in the mid-20th century. Bowen's theory posits that individuals are best understood within the context of their family relationships, which are seen as interconnected and interdependent. According to Bowen, each family member has a specific level of self-differentiation that influences their behavior within the family system.

== Publications ==
Bowen wrote about fifty papers, book chapters, and monographs based on his radically new relationships-based theory of human behavior. Some important publications were:

- 1966, The Use of Family Theory in Clinical Practice.
- 1974, Toward the Differentiation of Self in One's Family of Origin.
- 1978, Family Therapy in Clinical Practice, Northvale, NJ: Jason Aronson Inc., 1978.
- 1988, ''Family Evaluation: An Approach Based on Bowen Theory, co-written with Kerr, M.E. at The Family Center at Georgetown University Hospital," New York: Norton & Co., 1988.
- 2019, ''Handbook of Psychiatry Volume 22 | ISBN 978-613-8-38663-6, co-written with Javad Nurbakhsh; Hamideh Jahangiri; at The Lap Lambert Academic Publishing," Germany, 2019.

=== Publications about Bowen ===
- Roberta M. Gilbert, Extraordinary Relationships: A New Way of Thinking About Human Interactions, Minneapolis, MN: Chronimed Publishing, 1992.
- Robert J. Noone, Family and Self: Bowen Theory and the Shaping of Adaptive Capacity, Lanham, MD: Lexington Books, 2021.

== See also ==
- Systems psychology
- Edwin Friedman
