= Co-therapy =

Kind of psychotherapy

Co-therapy is a kind of psychotherapy conducted with more than one therapist present. It is different from conjoint therapy, which is psychotherapy conducted with more than one person as the client. For example, family therapy and couples therapy are types of conjoint therapy. A therapy can be conjoint therapy and not co-therapy, or co-therapy and not conjoint therapy, or both co-therapy and conjoint therapy. Co-therapy is especially applied during couple therapy. Carl Whitaker and Virginia Satir are credited as the founders of co-therapy. Co-therapy dates back to the early twentieth century in Vienna, where psychoanalytic practices were first taking place. It was originally named "multiple therapy" by Alfred Alder, and later introduced separately as "co-therapy" in the 1940s. Co-therapy began with two therapists of differing abilities, one essentially learning from the other, and providing the opportunity to hear feedback on their work.

== Advantages of co-therapy ==
=== An active support system ===
Co-therapy has recently been discussed more thoroughly, and its advantageous aspects have been analysed. Researchers, namely Bowers & Gauron, suggest that co-therapy provides each therapist with a "support system" in their partner. This allows for appropriate communication and the ability to lean on each other when "in the face of the power of the group". Bowers & Gauron are supported by other researchers in this aspect of co-therapy. Russell and Russell also suggest that both therapists are sources of support for each other. This can be in the case of clients (either singular, couples, or families) who express delusional systems or aspects of psychopathy that may be difficult to deal with alone. A co-therapeutic design is more beneficial in these situations as therapists act objectively in each other's aid. This situation highlights an additional advantage of the amount of emotional draining experienced by each therapist individually. Support of both therapists is carried through - if one is absent, there will always be someone available to collect information and continue with the sessions.

=== An educational model ===
Additionally, researchers suggest that a co-therapy relationship is beneficial as an educational model. Cividini and Klain proposed three models of co-therapy education. These three designs all incorporated differing levels of skill in each therapist, for example: situation one, having one experienced and one inexperienced therapist; situation two, including two inexperienced therapists; and situation three, involving two experienced therapists. All models are said to be advantageous, as they all provide educational benefits, such as an inexperienced therapist gaining confidence whilst alongside one with more experience, and in an inexperienced model, the likeliness of a therapist overruling a session is wildly reduced. Moreover, a co-therapist relationship can "compensate for individual weaknesses", meaning that more rounded conclusions can be drawn from therapy sessions as research has shown that co-therapeutic relationships provide greater insight into a client's analysis. Russell & Russell add to this notion by mentioning that conjoint therapeutic relationships can be valuable within the realm of education in order to "role-model didactically", suggesting that it is extremely beneficial for a more inexperienced therapist to learn in a conjoint environment.

=== A respected role model ===
Although therapists can and have been seen to role-model for each other, they are simultaneously acting as examples of good practice for the clients themselves. Researchers Peck & Schroeder suggested that co-therapists could act as alternative powers where necessary. An example is absent parents. This would benefit clients greatly as they can relate to situations created by therapists and discover healthy ways to react and process. Bowers & Gauron furthered this by mentioning that a healthy relationship between co-therapists can act as an effective role model to patients. This is extremely beneficial in situations such as couples therapy, for example. Therapists must also be actively aware of the notion that they are constantly being watched and act accordingly. Natalie Shainess described this situation as 'do as I tell you, but not as I do', suggesting that clients need to also be aware of the imperfect representation that could occur, signalling that they should copy what is said, rather than what they see.

== Disadvantages of co-therapy ==
Although advantages exist (as above), the disadvantages of co-therapy and the issues that may arise for both clients and therapists have also been explored. Dangers can impact clients, therapists and spouses of therapists alike. Fabrizio Napolitani described co-therapy as not only lacking advantages, but also not being free of hazards. The requirement for therapists is ever-increasing, with some suggesting that using two therapists when not extremely necessary is a waste of resources and adds to the expense of therapy provision. Therapists are less likely to be paired thoughtfully, and are usually randomly placed together. This could increase the likeliness of tension during sessions, and could create unnecessary competition. Alternatively, if the therapists form an amicable relationship, there is also the risk of their attention being diverted from the client, which leads to a negative impact on the session where the treatment of the patient is compromised.

=== Spouse involvement ===
A widely debated topic within co-therapy is the involvement of spouses. This could refer to both a spouse of a therapist or a co-therapy relationship that consists of spouses themselves. Many issues can arise as a result of this, for example, jealousy of a third-party relationship. Dickes and Dunn suggested that voyeurism was an intricate part of co-therapy, where therapists gain sexual attraction to their partner as a result of competition in diagnoses. Bowers & Gauron go into more detail on the issue, describing how a therapist and their spouse may disagree about the amount of time one spends with their co-therapist, and how their spouse may become insecure about this as they feel they are not of primary importance. Co-therapists are required to spend a lot of time together outside of therapy sessions to discuss diagnoses and analyses of patients which, although seen in one sense as an advantage, can cause issues in the personal relationships of the therapists themselves.
