= Mara Selvini Palazzoli =

Italian psychiatrist (1916–1999)

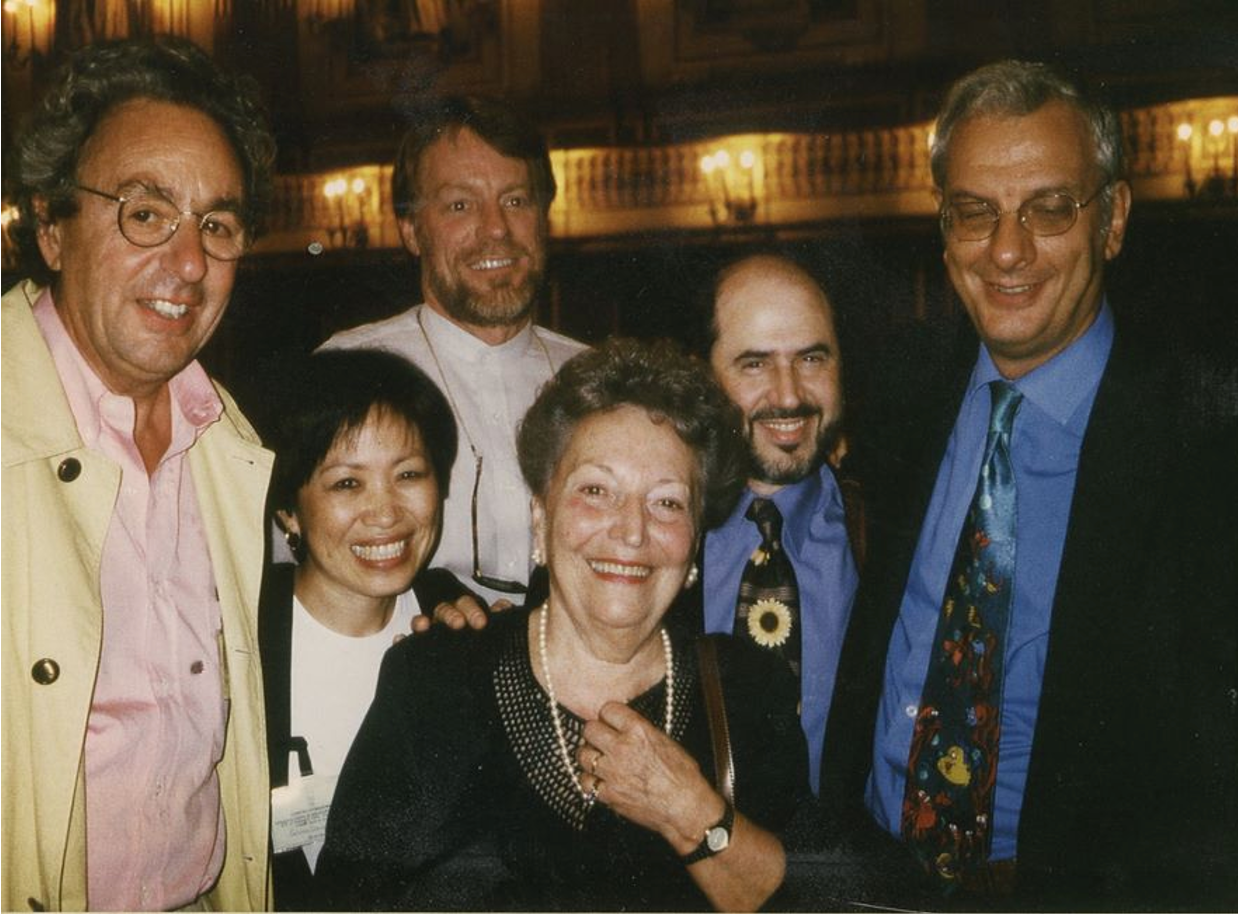
- Selvini Palazzoli with Maurizio Andolfi and Vincenzo Di Nicola in Naples, Italy, Nov 1996
- Born: Mara Palazzoli; 15 August 1916; Milan, Italy
- Died: 21 June 1999 (aged 82); Milan, Italy
- Citizenship: Italian; European
- Education: Catholic University of Milan (MD, 1941)
- Known for: Self-Starvation: From Individual to Family Therapy in the Treatment of Anorexia Nervosa (1978); Paradox and Counterparadox: A New Model in the Therapy of the Family in Schizophrenic Transaction (1978); The Work of Mara Selvini Palazzoli (Edited by Matteo Selvini, 1988); Family therapy
- Spouse: Prof. Aldo Selvini, noted cardiologist (m. 1947)
- Children: Michele, Anna, and Matteo, noted psychologist and family therapist
- Scientific career
- Fields: Medicine, Psychiatry, Psychoanalysis, Family Therapy
- Workplaces: Catholic University of Milan; Center for the Study of the Family; New Center for the Study of the Family
- Doctoral advisor: Gaetano Benedetti
- Website: www.scuolamaraselvini.it

Mara Selvini Palazzoli (1916–1999) was an Italian psychiatrist and founder in 1971, with Gianfranco Cecchin, Luigi Boscolo and Giuliana Prata, of the systemic and constructivist approach to family therapy which became known as the Milan family systems approach and more generally, the school of systemic family therapy. They were variously called the Milan Team or the Milan Associates. Mara Selvini Palazzoli and the Milan Team worked with serious psychiatric disorders in families with anorexic (see her book on Self-Starvation: From Individual to Family Therapy in the Treatment of Anorexia Nervosa, 1978) and schizophrenic members (see the original Milan Team's volume, Paradox and Counterparadox: A New Model in the Therapy of the Family in Schizophrenic Transaction, 1978; and a later team's work called, Family Games: General Models of Psychotic Processes in the Family, 1989).

Her work on anorexia nervosa attracted much attention beyond family therapy and she wrote on the historical, social, and cultural aspects of anorexia in her book, Self-Starvation and in Transcultural Psychiatry.

The Milan approach involved careful attention to everything, starting with language; for example, they did not refer to schizophrenia as a diagnosis but to "families in schizophrenic transaction," which created a powerful coherence between how family problems are imagined, the theory of their origins, and how to effect change.

This systemic approach in which the disturbed person and the family form a system and the therapeutic team is imagined as a system was based on American anthropologist Gregory Bateson's cybernetics theory, the work of the Mental Research Institute (MRI) in Palo Alto, California, and Paul Watzlawick's Pragmatics of Human Communication. Selvini Palazzoli extended her systemic model through consultations with larger systems such as a large school system, a hospital pediatrics ward, a teacher training institute and a large corporation which was reported with a new team of psychologists in The Hidden Games of Organizations (1986).

From her early pioneering work on self-starvation to the creation of the Milan model of systemic family therapy and finally with her consultations on larger systems, Selvini Palazzoli's work is considered theoretically groundbreaking, dramatic in style, and powerful in its impact clinically and institutionally. Her son, psychologist Matteo Selvini, collected her papers and selections from her books in The Work of Mara Selvini Palazzoli (1988). Appreciations of her work continued throughout her career and in her obituaries.

== Publications ==
Books

- Self-Starvation: From Individual to Family Therapy in the Treatment of Anorexia Nervosa (1978) ISBN 0876687575
- Paradox and Counterparadox: A New Model in the Therapy of the Family in Schizophrenic Transaction (1978) ISBN 0876687648
- The Hidden Games of Organizations (1986) ISBN 0-394-54315-7
- The Work of Mara Selvini Palazzoli (Edited by Matteo Selvini, 1988) ISBN 0876689497
- Family Games: General Models of Psychotic Processes in the Family (1989) ISBN 0393700704
