= Brief psychotherapy =

Form of psychotherapy

- MeSH: D011614

Brief psychotherapy (also brief therapy, planned short-term therapy) is an umbrella term for a variety of approaches to short-term, solution-oriented psychotherapy.

== Overview ==
Brief therapy differs from other schools of therapy in that it emphasizes (1) a focus on a specific problem and (2) direct intervention. In brief therapy, the therapist takes responsibility for working more pro-actively with the client in order to treat clinical and subjective conditions faster. It also emphasizes precise observation, utilization of natural resources, and a temporary suspension of disbelief to consider new perspectives and multiple viewpoints.

Rather than the formal analysis of historical causes of distress, the primary approach of brief therapy is to help the client to view the present from a wider context and to utilize more functional understandings (not necessarily at a conscious level). By becoming aware of these new understandings, successful clients will de facto undergo spontaneous and generative change.

Brief therapy is often highly strategic, exploratory, and solution-based rather than problem-oriented. It is less concerned with how a problem arose than with the current factors sustaining it and preventing change. Brief therapists do not adhere to one "correct" approach, but rather accept that there being many paths, any of them may or may not, in combination, turn out to be ultimately beneficial.

== Founding proponents ==
Milton Erickson was a practitioner of brief therapy, using clinical hypnosis as his primary tool. To a great extent, he developed this himself. His approach was popularized by Jay Haley, in the book Uncommon therapy: The psychiatric techniques of Milton Erickson M.D.

The analogy Erickson uses is that of a person who wants to change the course of a river. if he opposes the river by trying to block it, the river will merely go over and around him. But if he accepts the force of the river and diverts it in a new direction, the force of the river will cut a new channel.

Richard Bandler, the co-founder of neuro-linguistic programming, is another firm proponent of brief therapy. After many years of studying Erickson's therapeutic work, he wrote:

It's easier to cure a phobia in ten minutes than in five years ... I didn't realize that the speed with which you do things makes them last ... I taught people the phobia cure. They'd do part of it one week, part of it the next, and part of it the week after. Then they'd come to me and say "It doesn't work!" If, however, you do it in five minutes, and repeat it till it happens very fast, the brain understands. That's part of how the brain learns ... I discovered that the human mind does not learn slowly. It learns quickly. I didn't know that.

== Notable therapists ==
- Nicholas Cummings (brief therapy, focused therapy)
- Milton H. Erickson (hypnotherapy, strategic therapy, brief therapy)
- Giorgio Nardone (brief therapy, strategic therapy)
- Steve de Shazer (solution focused brief therapy)
- Paul Watzlawick (Brief therapy, systems theory)

== See also ==
- List of counseling topics
- Mental Research Institute – one of the founding clinics of brief therapy and home of a number of the notable therapists mentioned above
- Solution focused brief therapy
