= Salvador Minuchin =

Argentina-born Israeli-American family therapist (1921-2017)

- Born: October 13, 1921; San Salvador, Entre Ríos, Argentina
- Died: October 30, 2017 (aged 96); Boca Raton, Florida, United States
- Known for: Structural family therapy

Salvador Minuchin (October 13, 1921 – October 30, 2017) was a family therapist born and raised in San Salvador, Entre Ríos, Argentina. He developed structural family therapy, which addresses problems within a family by charting the relationships between family members, or between subsets of family (Minuchin, 1974). These charts represent power dynamics as well as the boundaries between different subsystems. The therapist tries to disrupt dysfunctional relationships within the family, and cause them to settle back into a healthier pattern.

== Career ==
Salvador Minuchin served as a physician in the Israeli army after obtaining his degree in medicine. Once his service was finished, he traveled to New York City to be trained in child psychiatry with Nathan Ackerman. When his training with Ackerman was complete, Minuchin returned to Israel to assist displaced children as a child psychiatrist (Nichols, 2010). In 1954 he returned to the United States to be trained in psychoanalysis at the William Alanson White Institute. After completing his psychoanalytic training, Minuchin worked as a child psychiatrist at the Wiltwyck School for delinquent boys, where he decided that treating whole families would be worthwhile.

While he held his position at the Wiltwyck School, Minuchin developed a form of family therapy with his co-workers. Their method involved Minuchin or another psychiatrist performing a therapy session with a family while the other psychiatrists viewed the session through a one-way mirror (Nichols, 2010). Observing one another work allowed the therapists to learn techniques easily and led Minuchin to develop structural family therapy. In 1962, once Minuchin had generated his theoretical formulations for family structure, he traveled to work with Jay Haley. Minuchin's work at the Wiltwyck School led to his first book, Families of the Slums (1967), which outlined his theoretical model of family therapy.

Minuchin supervised both Esther Perel and Virginia Goldner.

In 1965 Minuchin became the director of the Child Guidance Clinic in Philadelphia. He stepped down from this position in 1976 to become the head of training at the center until 1981, when he left Philadelphia to practice and teach child psychiatry in New York (Nichols, 2010). In 1996, he moved to Boston and retired from his career. Minuchin died on October 30, 2017, in Boca Raton, Florida.

== Friendship with Jay Haley ==
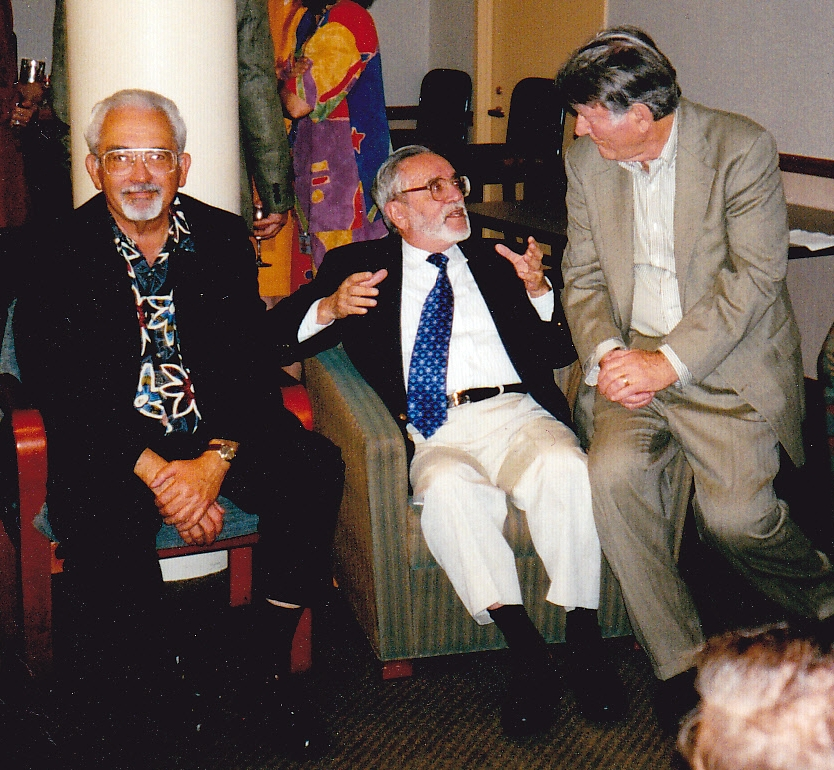
Braulio Montalvo, Salvador Minuchin, and Jay Haley

One of the developments that came out of Minuchin's work with Jay Haley was the collaborative friendship between the two professionals. Minuchin once wrote of Haley as his most important teacher, a man who was "forever pushing the envelope, testing the limits of new ideas" to challenge Minuchin and himself. Minuchin characterizes their relationship as similar to the friendship between Spock and Captain Kirk from the television show Star Trek in that Jay Haley was highly intellectual, while Minuchin was extremely pragmatic (Minuchin, 2007).

== Theoretical contributions to family therapy ==
Salvador Minuchin made several important contributions to the field of family therapy during his career, the most important of which was the development of structural family therapy (Nichols, 2010). When Minuchin first began to work as a family therapist, he wrote about enmeshed and disengaged families, which became an important component of structural family therapy. Minuchin also suggested that most families try to solve their problems through first-order changes (changes of single behaviors) and that in order for a family's structure to significantly change and become healthy again, second-order changes (alterations of the family's rules) are necessary. These concepts informed his conception of structural family therapy and influenced other branches of family psychology.

== Psychosomatic model for treatment of anorexia nervosa ==
In 1978 Minuchin helped write Psychosomatic Families: Anorexia Nervosa in Context, which details a clinical model for the causes and treatment of anorexia nervosa based on an integration of medical research and previously successful psychological interventions (Minuchin, Rosman, & Baker, 1978). The psychosomatic model of anorexia nervosa specifically combines elements of psychodynamic and behavioral theory to create a comprehensive account of the origins of anorexia nervosa in a family system. According to the book, optimal treatment of anorexia nervosa involves the application of behavioral and structural family therapy methods. The book also features four case studies of families whose members have suffered from anorexia nervosa and how the model's treatment was successfully applied to their situation.

== Criticisms of postmodern therapy ==
In an editorial in The Journal of Marital and Family Therapy, Minuchin (1998) expressed concerns about postmodern family therapy. He argued that both narrative therapy and solution-focused therapy bring unique and useful methods to the practice of family therapy, such as emphasizing alternative personal narratives to cope with problems. However, he stated that postmodern therapies lost the information that family dialogues produced, the spontaneity of therapist-directed enactments, the focus on the therapist as a positive and helpful, that the therapist can make a family feel more connected, and the acknowledgement that the therapist must function with personal bias. In other words, Minuchin felt that postmodern therapy displaced the family and created a paradigm for therapy that was not representative of the psychological experience of a family.

In a follow-up to his initial criticisms, Minuchin (1999) also stated that he felt the focus of postmodern therapy was too broad to be effectively applied to the specific problems of a family unit. He suggests that family therapy should be used to alleviate stress of pain within a family, not to remove the influence of overarching cultural narratives.

== Minuchin Center for the Family ==
When Minuchin moved to New York in 1981, he established the Family Studies Institute, where he could teach family therapists and interface directly with the foster care system through consultation services (Nichols, 2010). Renamed the Minuchin Center for the Family after Minuchin's retirement in 1995, it is dedicated to teaching the concepts and techniques of structural family therapy, and to consulting with organizations that work with families challenged by poverty, racism, and discrimination due to gender or sexual orientation.

== Selected works ==
=== Books ===
- with Braulio Montalvo; Bernard G. Guerney, Jr.; Bernice L. Rosman; Florence Schumer, Families of the Slums. New York: Basic Books, 1967.
- The Disorganized and Disadvantaged Family: Structure and Process (1967)
- Psychoanalytic Therapies and the Low Socioeconomic Population (1968)
- Families and Family Therapy. Cambridge, Massachusetts: Harvard University Press, 1974.
- with B. Rosman, B. & L. Baker. Psychosomatic Families: Anorexia Nervosa in Context. Cambridge, Massachusetts: Harvard University Press, 1978.
- with H. C. Fishman. Family Therapy Techniques. Cambridge, Massachusetts: Harvard University Press, 2004.
- with Michael P. Nichols; 'Family Healing Strategies for Hope and Understanding' New York, NY: The Free Press, 1998.

=== Articles ===
- "Where is the family in narrative family therapy?" The Journal of Marital and Family Therapy, vol. 24, 397–403. (1998)
- "Retelling, reimagining, and re-searching: A continuing conversation". The Journal of Marital and Family Therapy, vol. 25, 9–14. (1999)
- "Jay Haley: My Teacher". Family Process, vol. 46, 413–414. (2007)
