= Structural family therapy =

Method of psychotherapy

Structural family therapy (SFT) is a method of psychotherapy developed by Salvador Minuchin which addresses problems in functioning within a family. Structural family therapists strive to enter, or "join", the family system in therapy in order to understand the invisible rules which govern its functioning, map the relationships between family members or between subsets of the family, and ultimately disrupt dysfunctional relationships within the family, causing it to stabilize into healthier patterns. Minuchin contends that pathology rests not in the individual, but within the family system.

SFT utilizes, not only a special systems terminology, but also a means of depicting key family parameters diagrammatically. Its focus is on the structure of the family, including its various substructures. In this regard, Minuchin is a follower of systems and communication theory, since his structures are defined by transactions among interrelated systems within the family. He subscribes to the systems notions of wholeness and equifinality, both of which are critical to his notion of change. An essential trait of SFT is that the therapist actually enters, or "joins", with the family system as a catalyst for positive change. Joining with a family is a goal of the therapist early on in his or her therapeutic relationship with the family. Structural and Strategic therapy are important therapeutic models to identify as many therapists use these models as the bases for treatment. Each model has its own approach using different ways in conceptualizing a problem and developing treatment plans that support the goals stated for therapy. In addition, theory-based treatment plans are the source for goal development and treatment options by identifying the presenting problem and social influences. Both these models use similar approaches and define goals with various therapeutic processes that begin with the building of therapist and client relationship. In addition, diversity and theory are identified as a major component in choosing a theory that addresses diversity issues.

== Goals ==
The goal of this model is to prevent sequences from repeating, by interrupting the family's covert hierarchical structure. This includes the distribution of power shifting to others to by changing the style of interaction. However, structural therapy is the opposite and works on altering the dysfunctional structure by promoting growth and encouragement in individuals for the building of family support. In addition, goals of family structure are to alter the dynamics and provide new alternative ways in solving problems and interactions. This includes subsystems that influence the way each member interacts with each other. Members that have trouble in solving family problems require a change in structure, implementing some order and organization. This includes realignment or the altering of behaviors in the family structure by working with each member finding ways to improve interaction.

== Interventions ==
Structural therapy uses family mapping to join and accommodate the family setting. In addition, these areas pertain to family rules, patterns, and structure. Minuchin describes six areas of observation that are identified in the family structure. These areas include transactional patterns, flexibility, resonance, context, family development stage, and maintaining family interactions. In reference, intervention methods are based on directives that feed the symptom by giving a set of instructions to emphasize communication. The model also conceptualizes the problem with finding the right strategy to understand the issue with clarity.

== Foundation and assumptions ==
Structural family therapy helps identify family interactions by identifying the organization of that family setting. The primary assumption and foundation of this model is to identify family structure and the subsystems that are formed through the level of authority and boundaries. This includes a subsystem that develops boundaries that begin to evolve patterns for communication and everyday interaction. Nichols refers to family structure as the framework for transactions that have meaning and order to a family structure.

The family structure model is based on organization and subsystems. This includes interactions between individuals, with assigned roles and expectations. Family members that are establishing rules will begin to recognize how that interaction will manifest into redundant patterns of communication. Members of the family begin to take on specific roles. This includes the level of authority and boundaries set forth during the development of the family structure. The main objective is to understand how members of a family structure can learn to solve problems with a greater understanding of interaction.

In SFT, family rules are defined as an invisible set of functional demands that persistently organizes the interaction of the family. Important rules for a therapist to study include coalitions, boundaries, and power hierarchies between subsystems.

According to Minuchin, a family is functional or dysfunctional based upon its ability to adapt to various stressors (extra-familial, idiosyncratic, developmental), which, in turn, rests upon the clarity and appropriateness of its subsystem boundaries. Boundaries are characterized along a continuum from enmeshment through semi-diffuse permeability to rigidity. Additionally, family subsystems are characterized by a hierarchy of power, typically with the parental subsystem "on top" vis-à-vis the offspring subsystem.

Structural family therapy is underpinned by a clearly articulated model of family functioning, and has been developed and used most consistently in services for children and families. In healthy families, parent-children boundaries are both clear and semi-diffuse, allowing the parents to interact together with some degree of authority in negotiating between themselves the methods and goals of parenting. From the children's side, the parents are not enmeshed with the children, allowing for the degree of autonomous sibling and peer interactions that produce socialization, yet not so disengaged, rigid, or aloof, ignoring childhood needs for support, nurturance, and guidance. Dysfunctional families exhibit mixed subsystems (i.e., coalitions) and improper power hierarchies, as in the example of an older child being brought into the parental subsystem to replace a physically or emotionally absent spouse.

The basic assumptions of Minuchin's structural family therapy were investigated by Gehring and his colleagues at the University of Zurich and Stanford University including the Family System Test FAST. As expected, studies with Western families using different settings showed that the concept of boundaries (i.e., generational boundaries and external family boundaries) and the flexibility of the organizational structure are central dimensions for the description of family development. In particular, stressed families and those with a mentally ill parent or child, were significantly more likely to show hierarchy reversals and, in terms of cohesion, cross-generational coalitions.

== Criticisms ==
Structural family therapy has also been subjected to many criticisms. This theory met with much criticism, that this type of theory focused more on issues of power between different generations, rather than focusing more on issues of power that take place between relationships inside the current generation, for example, spousal abuse. In addition to this criticism, it has also been said that this kind of therapy only involves members of a nuclear family and ignores the interaction of other factors such as: extended family, social institutions, and neighbours.

Further, feminist family therapy critics have argued that concepts such as "enmeshment" may "reflect prototypically male standards of self and relationships, which contribute to the common practice of labeling women's preferred interactional styles as pathological or dysfunctional." Empirical research in this critical feminist tradition has found that young women with the strongest sense of family cohesion have the highest social self-esteem, despite exhibiting what could be pathologized as "enmeshment".

== See also ==
- Family systems therapy
- Systems theory
