= Bateson Project =

Family dynamics study

The Bateson Project (1953-1963) was the name given to a ground-breaking collaboration organized by Gregory Bateson which was responsible for some of the most important papers and innovations in communication and psychotherapy in the 1950s and early 1960s. Its other members were Donald deAvila Jackson, Jay Haley, John Weakland, and Bill Fry. Perhaps their most famous and influential publication was Towards a Theory of Schizophrenia (1956), which introduced the concept of the Double Bind, and helped found Family Therapy.

One of the project's first locations was the Menlo Park VA Hospital, which was chosen because of Bateson's previous work there as an ethnologist. The initial research, which was funded by a Rockefeller grant, focused on "strange communication" and nonsensical language among the patients of the institution who had schizophrenia. The group studied this within the context of double bind communication in family dynamics.

== Bibliography ==
- "Development of a theory: A history of a research project", in C. Sluzki & D. Ransom (Eds.). Double bind: The foundation of the communicational approach to the family. NY: Grune & Stratton, Publishers.
- "One thing leads to another", by John Weakland, in C. Wilder-Mott & J. Weakland (Eds.) Rigor & Imagination: Essays from the legacy of Gregory Bateson. NY: Praeger.
- Change: Principles of Problem Formation and Problem Resolution, with Paul Watzlawick and Richard Fisch (WW Norton, NY, 1974).
- The Interactional View: Studies at the Mental Research Institute, Palo Alto, 1965–1974, edited with Paul Watzlawick (WW Norton, NY, 1979).
