= Steps to an Ecology of Mind =

1972 book by Gregory Bateson

- First edition (p/b)
- Author: Gregory Bateson
- Subject: Anthropology, Cybernetics
- Publisher: Chandler Publishing Company
- Publication date: 1972
- Pages: 542
- ISBN: 0-226-03905-6
- OCLC: 42309905

Steps to an Ecology of Mind is a collection of Gregory Bateson's short works over his long and varied career. Subject matter includes essays on anthropology, cybernetics, psychiatry, and epistemology. It was originally published by Ballantine Books in 1972 (republished 2000 with foreword by Mary Catherine Bateson).

== Part I: Metalogues ==
The book begins with a series of metalogues, which take the form of conversations with his daughter Mary Catherine Bateson. The metalogues are mostly thought exercises with titles such as "What is an Instinct" and "How Much Do You Know." In the metalogues, the playful dialectic structure itself is closely related to the subject matter of the piece.

DEFINITION: A metalogue is a conversation about some problematic subject. This conversation should be such that not only do the participants discuss the problem but the structure of the conversation as a whole is also relevant to the same subject. Only some of the conversations here presented achieve this double format.

Notably, the history of evolutionary theory is inevitably a metalogue between man and nature, in which the creation and interaction of ideas must necessarily exemplify evolutionary process.

- Why Do Things Get in a Muddle? (01948, previously unpublished)
- Why Do Frenchmen? (01951, Impulse; 01953, ETC: A Review of General Semantics, Vol. X)
- About Games and Being Serious (01953, ETC: A Review of General Semantics, Vol. X)
- How Much Do You Know? (01953, ETC: A Review of General Semantics, Vol. X)
- Why Do Things Have Outlines? (01953, ETC: A Review of General Semantics, Vol. XI)
- Why a Swan? (01954, Impulse)
- What Is an Instinct? (01969, Sebeok, Approaches to Animal Communication)

== Part II: Form and Pattern in Anthropology ==
Part II is a collection of anthropological writings, many of which were written while he was married to Margaret Mead.

- Culture Contact and Schismogenesis (01935, Man, Article 199, Vol. XXXV)
- Experiments in Thinking About Observed Ethnological Material (01940, Seventh Conference on Methods in Philosophy and the Sciences; 01941, Philosophy of Science, Vol. 8, No. 1)
- Morale and National Character (01942, Civilian Morale, Watson)
- Bali: The Value System of a Steady State (01949, Social Structure: Studies Presented to A.R. Radcliffe-Brown, Fortes)
- Style, Grace, and Information in Primitive Art (01967, A Study of Primitive Art, Forge)

== Part III: Form and Pathology in Relationship ==
Part III is devoted to the theme of "Form and Pathology in Relationships." His essay on alcoholism examines the alcoholic state of mind, and the methodology of Alcoholics Anonymous within the framework of the then-nascent field of cybernetics.

- Social Planning and the Concept of Deutero-Learning was a "comment on Margaret Mead's article "The Comparative Study of Culture and the Purposive Cultivation of Democratic Values," 01942, Science, Philosophy and Religion, Second Symposium)
- A Theory of Play and Fantasy (01954, A.P.A. Regional Research Conference in Mexico City, March 11; 01955, A.P.A. Psychiatric Research Reports)
- Epidemiology of a Schizophrenia (edited version of a talk, "How the Deviant Sees His Society," from 01955, at a conference on "The Epidemiology of Mental Health," Brighton, Utah)
- Toward a Theory of Schizophrenia (01956, Behavioral Science, Vol. I, No. 4)
- The Group Dynamics of Schizophrenia (01960)
- Minimal Requirements for a Theory of Schizophrenia (01959)
- Double Bind, 1969 (01969)
- The Logical Categories of Learning and Communication (01968)
- The Cybernetics of "Self": A Theory of Alcoholism (01971)

== Part IV: Biology and Evolution ==
- On Empty-Headedness Among Biologists and State Boards of Education (in BioScience, Vol. 20, 1970)
- The Role of Somatic Change in Evolution (in the journal of Evolution, Vol 17, 1963)
- Problems in Cetacean and Other Mammalian Communication (appeared as Chapter 25, pp. 569–799, in Whales, Dolphins and Purpoises, edited by Kenneth S. Norris, University of California Press, 1966)
- A Re-examination of "Bateson's Rule" (accepted for publication in the Journal of Genetics)

== Part V: Epistemology and Ecology. ==
- Cybernetic Explanation (from the American Behavioral Scientist, Vol. 10, No. 8, April 1967, pp. 29–32)
- Redundancy and Coding (appeared as Chapter 22 in Animal Communication: Techniques of Study and Results of Research, edited by Thomas A. Sebeok, 1968, Indiana University Press)
- Conscious Purpose Versus Nature (this lecture was given in August, 1968, to the London Conference on the Dialectics of Liberation, appearing in a book of the same name, Penguin Books)
- Effects of Conscious Purpose on Human Adaptation (prepared as the Bateson's position paper for Wenner-Gren Foundation Conference on "Effects of Conscious Purpose on Human Adaptation". Bateson chaired the conference held in Burg Wartenstein, Austria, July 17–24, 1968)
- Form, Substance, and Difference (the Nineteenth Annual Korzbski Memorial Lecture, January 9, 1970, under the auspices of the Institute of General Semantics; appeared in the General Semantics Bulletin, No. 37, 1970)

== Part VI: Crisis in the Ecology of Mind ==
- From Versailles to Cybernetics (previously unpublished. This lecture was given 21 April 1966, to the "Two Worlds Symposium" at (CSU) Sacramento State College)
- Pathologies of Epistemology (given at the Second Conference on Mental Health in Asia and the Pacific, 1969, at the East–West Center, Hawaii, appearing in the report of that conference)
- The Roots of Ecological Crisis (testimony on behalf of the University of Hawaii Committee on Ecology and Man, presented in March 1970)
- Ecology and Flexibility in Urban Civilization (written for a conference convened by Bateson in October 1970 on "Restructuring the Ecology of a Great City" and subsequently edited)

== See also ==
- Double bind
- Information ecology
- Philosophy of mind
- Social sustainability
- Systems philosophy
- Systems theory
