= Richard Fisch =

American physician

Richard Fisch (1926–2011) was an American psychiatrist best known for his pioneering work in brief therapy.

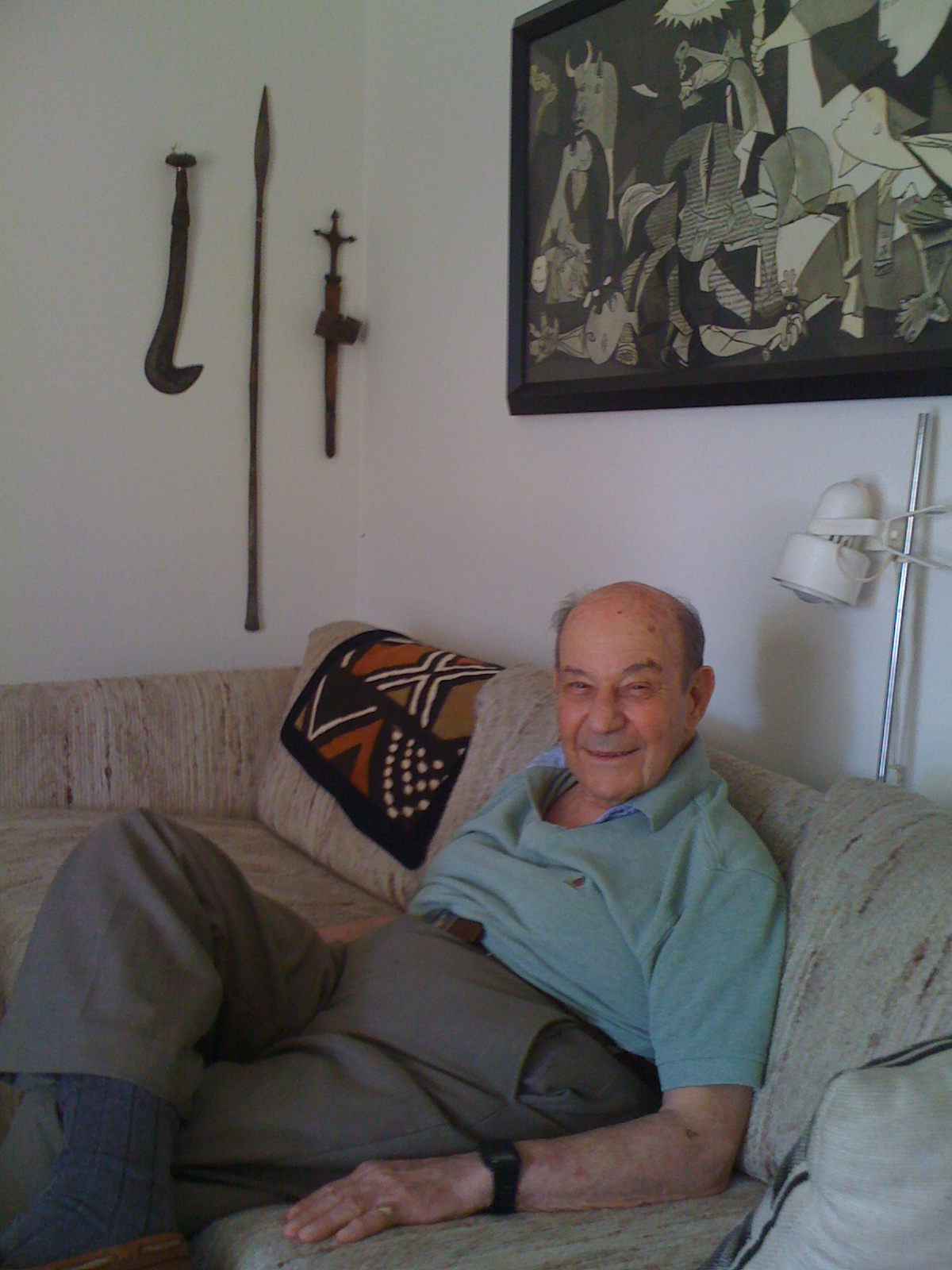
Dick Fisch, at his home in Menlo Park, CA in 2009. Photograph by James Keim

Dick Fisch graduated from Colby College, studied for a year at Columbia University School of Anthropology, and then entered the New York Medical College where he graduated in 1954. Before embarking on his studies, he served as medic for the US Navy from 1945-1946.

Dr. Fisch completed a Psychiatric Residency at the Sheppard Pratt Health System, Brookdale University Hospital Medical Center in 1958. While at Sheppard Pratt, he was heavily influenced by Harry Stack Sullivan's Interpersonal Theory of Behavior and had his first indirect contact with Don D. Jackson who would later bring him to the Mental Research Institute (MRI) in Palo Alto, CA.

MRI "became the go-to place for any therapist who wanted to be on the cutting edge of psychotherapy research and practice. Fostering a climate of almost untrammeled experimentalism, MRI started the first formal training program in family therapy, produced some of the seminal early papers and books in the field, and became a place where some of the field's leading figures - Paul Watzlawick, Richard Fisch, Jules Riskin, Virginia Satir, Salvador Minuchin, R.D. Laing, Irvin D. Yalom, Cloe Madanes - came to work or just hang out".

While at MRI, he additionally worked with John Weakland, Jay Haley, Paul Watzlawick, Virginia Satir, and many other prominent figures in the development of family therapy, brief therapy, systems theory and communication theory.

In 1965, in a memo to Don Jackson, dated September 15, 1965, Fisch proposed creation of a research project that would "provide imaginative, well planned, brief therapy and at the same time permit a more thorough study if the effectiveness of this approach. With the backing of Don Jackson, MRI's Brief Therapy Center as founded by Fisch, John Weakland, Paul Watzlawick, and Art Bodin. The Brief Therapy Center was central to the emergence of Brief Therapy approaches that have radically changed the practice of psychotherapy.

Richard Fisch, who suffered from Alzheimers in the last stages of his life, died at 84 in 2011.

== Publications ==
- Fisch, R. (1963). [Review of M. Grotjahn, Psychoanalysis and family neurosis.] Family Process.
- Fisch, R. (1964). Home visits in a private psychiatric practice. Family Process, 3, 114-126.
- Fisch, R. (1965). Resistance to change in the psychiatric community. Archives of General *Psychiatry, 13, 359-366.
- Fisch, R. (1975). The treatment of women with low sexual desire. In M. I. Lief (Ed.), Medical aspects of human sexuality. Baltimore: Williams and Wilkins.
- Fisch, R. (1977). Sometimes its better for the right hand not to know what the left hand is doing. In P. Papp (Ed.), Family therapy: Full length case studies. New York: Gardner Press.
- Fisch, R. (1978). [Review of J. Haley, Problem solving therapy.] Family Process, 17.
- Fisch, R. (1982). Erickson's impact on brief psychotherapy. In J. Zeig (Ed.), Ericksonian approaches to hypnosis and psychotherapy. New York: Brunner/Mazel.
- Fisch, R. (1988). Training in the brief therapy model. In H. A. Liddle (Ed.), Handbook of family therapy training and supervision. New York: Guilford Press.
- Fisch, R. (1989). I’ve had my share. In J. A. Kottler & D. S. Blau (Eds.), The imperfect therapist. San Francisco: Jossey-Bass.
- Fisch, R. (1990). The broader implications of Milton H. Ericksons work. In S. Lankton (Ed.), Ericksonian Monographs,7. New York: Brunner/Mazel.
- Fisch, R. (1990). Problem solving psychotherapy. In J. Zeig & W. M. Munion (Eds.), What is psychotherapy? Contemporary perspectives. San Francisco: Jossey-Bass.
- Fisch, R. (1994). Basic elements in the brief therapies. In M. F. Hoyt (Ed.), Constructive therapies. New York: Guilford Press.
- Fisch, R. (1994). Case commentary: A woman with chronic anxiety. In S. Lankton & K. Erickson, (Eds.), The essence of a single session success: Ericksonian monographs, No. 9. New York: Brunner/Mazel.
- Fisch, R. (1994). The essence of Ericksonian methodsup for grabs. In J. K. Zeig (Ed.), Ericksonian methods: The essence of the story. New York: Brunner/Mazel.
- Fisch, R., Watzlawick, P., Weakland, J. H., & Bodin, A. M. (1972). On unbecoming family therapists. In A. Ferber, M. - Mendelsohn, & A. Napier (Eds.), The book of family therapy. New York: Science House. [Also in P. Watzlawick & J. H. Weakland (Eds.), The interactional view. New York: W. W. Norton, 1977.]
- Fisch, R., & Weakland, J. H. (1976). A case of hyperactivity resolved by brief psychotherapy. In D. M. Ross & S. A. Ross (Eds.), Hyperactivity: Research, theory and action. New York: John Wiley.
- Fisch, R., & Weakland, J. H. (1984). Cases that don't make sense: Brief strategic treatment in medical practice. Family Systems Medicine, 2(2), 125-136.
- Fisch, R., & Weakland, J. H. (1985). The strategic approach. In S. Henao & N. P. Grose (Eds.), Principles of family systems in family medicine. New York: Brunner/Mazel.
- Fisch, R., & Weakland, J. H. (1992). Brief therapyMRI style. In S. Budman, et al. (Eds.), The first session in brief therapy. New York: Guilford Press.
- Fisch, R., Weakland, J. H., Schlanger, K., & Watzlawick, P. (1992). El Mental Research Institute cumple 33 anos: Hacia donde va? Perspectivas Sistemicas, 5(21), 4-6.
- Fisch, R., Weakland, J. H., & Segal, L. (1982). The tactics of change: Doing therapy briefly. San Francisco: Jossey-Bass. [Also in the following foreign editions: Change: La Tattiche del Cambiamento. Rome: Casa Editrice Astrolabio, 1983; La Tactica del Cambio. Barcelona: Editorial Herder, 1984; Tokyo: Kongo Shuppan, in press; Stuttgart: Klett-Cotta, in press; Stockholm: Bokforlaget Naturoch Kultur, in press.]
- Fisch, R., Weakland, J., Watzlawick, P., Segal, L., Hoebel, F., & Deardorff, C. (1975). Learning brief therapy: an introductory manual. Palo Alto: Mental Research Institute.
- Fisch, R., deShazer, S., & Ray, W. (2000). A little friction can be fun: A dialogue between Richard *Fisch and Steve deShazer. (2 audiotape). The Hinks-Delcrest Institute, Toronto, Canada.
- Fisch, R., Ray, W., & Schlanger, K. (1996). MRI Then & Now: Brief Therapy in Context. (2 audiotapes). AAMFT Convention Tapes
- Ray, W., & Fisch, R. (1995). On John Weakland (With Richard Fisch). AAMFT Family Therapy News, 26 (5), October,5
- Schlanger, K., Weakland, J., Fisch, R., & Watzlawick, P. (1992). MRI: con 30 años de historia, adónde va? Perspectivas sistémicas, April/May, Buenos Aires, Argentina.
- Watzlawick, P., Weakland, J. H., & Fisch, R. (1974). Change: Principles of problem formation and problem resolution. New York: W. W. Norton. [Also the following foreign editions: Lösungen; zur Theorie und Praxis menschlichen Wandels. Bern, Stuttgart & Vienna: Hans Huber Medical Publisher, 1974 (2nd ed., 1979); Change. Sulla formazione e la soluzione dei problemi. Rome: Astrolabio, 1974; Het kan anders. Over het onderkennen en oplossen van menselijke problemen. Deventer (Holland): Van Loghum Slaterus, 1974; Changements. Paradoxes et psychothérapie.Paris: Editions du Seuil, 1974; Cambio. Formación y solución de los problemas humanos. Barcelona: Editorial Herder, 1976; Mudança: Principios de formacão e resolucão de problemas. São Paulo: Editorial Cultrix, 1977;Forandring: Att stalla och losa problem. Stockholm: Natur & Kultur, 1978; Muutoksen avaimet. Jyväskylä (Finland): Gummerus, 1979; Shinui: Ekronot shel yetzirat beayot ufitrona. Tel-Aviv: Sifriat Poalim, 1979;Forandring: Prinsipper for hvordan problemer oppstar og hvordan de loses. Oslo: Gyldendal Norsk Forlag, 1980; Valtozas. Budapest: Gondolat, 1990; Henka no genri. Tokyo: Hosei University Press, 1992.]
- Watzlawick, P., Weakland, J., & Fisch, J. (1974). Change: Principles of Problem Formation & Problem Resolution, 1974, NY: W.W. Norton.
- Fisch, R., Weakland, J., & Segal, L. (1982). The Tactics of Change Doing Therapy Briefly, 1982, San Francisco, CA:Jossey-Bass.
- Fisch, R., Weakland, J., Watzlawick, P., & Bodin, A. (1972). On Unbecoming Family Therapists, (With R. Fisch, P.Watzlawick, & A. Bodin) in The Book of Family Therapy, pp. 597–617.
- Weakland, Fisch, R., Watzlawick, P., & Bodin, A. (1974). Brief Therapy: Focused Problem Resolution (with R. Fisch, P.Watzlawick & A. Bodin), Family Process, 13, 141-168.
- Weakland, J., & Fisch, R. (1976). Brief Therapy (With R. Fisch), in Hyperactivity: Research, Theory & Action, D. Ross & S. Ross, Eds. NY: Wiley, pp. 176–182.
- Weakland, J., Fisch, R., Watzlawick, P. (1984). Kurztherapie: Ein umfassender Ansatz, in Das Buch der Familientherapie, ed. by Martin R. Textor. Fachbuchhandlung fur Psychologie, Frankfurt, pp. 50–64.
- Weakland, J. & Fisch, R. (1984). Cases that Don't Make Sense: Brief Strategic Treatment in Medical Practice (with R.Fisch), Family Systems Medicine, (2) 2, 125-136.
- Fisch, R., Weakland, J., Watzlawick, P., & Schlanger, K. (1992). El Mental Research Institute cumple años: hacia donde va? Perspectivas Sistemicas (Buenos Aires), (5) 21, 4-6.
- Fisch, R., & Weakland, J. (1992). Brief Therapy − MRI Style (with R. Fisch). In The First Session in Brief Therapy, S. Budman, M. Hoyt, & S. Friedman, eds., NY, Guilford Publications, pp. 306–323.
- Bavelas, J., Weakland, J., Haley, J., Fisch, R., & Wilder, C. (1998). A conversation about beginnings, in W. Ray, & S.deShazer (Eds.), Evolving Brief Therapies, Iowa City: IA: Geist & Russell, 1998, pp. 3–43.
