= The Worst Best Man =

2020 novel by Mia Sosa

- First edition
- Author: Mia Sosa
- Language: English
- Genre: Fiction, Romance
- Publisher: Avon Books
- Publication date: 2020

The Worst Best Man is a 2020 contemporary romance novel written by Mia Sosa.

== Plot ==
Wedding coordinator Carolina Santos is left at the altar. Three years later, she has an opportunity to win a dream job. She is assigned a marketing specialist - Max Hartwell, her former fiancé's brother. While working together, the two eventually fall in love.

== Background ==
Mia Sosa is half Puerta Rican and half Brazilian. She was raised by her divorced mother and her mother's two sisters, whose marriages had also failed. Sosa's first book was published in 2015.

The novel is a contemporary romance, set in Washington, D.C. It follows the trope of enemies to lovers. While Sosa's previous books contained Latino characters, the heroine of The Worst Best Man shares Sosa's Brazilian heritage. Like her other novels, the book has sharply drawn supporting characters. Sosa noted that "Relationships with family characters are a familiar theme in all my romances. Friends and family aren’t just part of the background. Incorporating them into the romance makes you see the way two people who have promised happily ever after will still interact with each other as part of a larger group. In Brazilian and Puerto Rican culture, family and tradition are a ‘thing’, whether people screw up or not."

== Reception ==
Both Publishers Weekly and Kirkus Reviews awarded the book a starred review. Publishers Weekly noted that the book's "soap opera premise" was "fantastically fun" In Kirkus, reviewer Kate Voorsanger Ryan warned that the book is "so funny you might not be able to read it in public without making snorting noises". Publishers Weekly noted that the book is more than just a romp; the heroine "is masterfully nuanced, depicting her experiences as a woman of color, her struggle to balance her parents’ expectations with her own happiness, and the double bind of being accused of being overly stoic when she controls her feelings and overly emotional when she expresses them."
