= Richard Goldsby =

American immunologist

Richard A. Goldsby is an American immunologist who is professor of biology at Amherst College, Massachusetts. In addition to his specialism, he has written on various topics, including the social and biological significance of HIV/AIDS and of the human racial differences. He is a notable proponent of the view that races are biological, as well as social constructs.

== Life and career ==
Goldsby received a PhD in chemistry at the University of California, Berkeley in 1961. He is an immunologist, interested in the cellular and molecular biology of the immune response, and has served as professor of biology at Amherst College since 1982. He is also an adjunct professor in the Department of Veterinary and Animal Sciences at the University of Massachusetts Amherst.

His interest in the biology of race arose from efforts to understand the biological roots of the debates about a relationship between race and behavior. It led to his publication of Race and Races (Macmillan, 1971, 2nd Ed. 1977). Goldsby argues that there are genetic differences between the races of man, as measured by different gene frequencies and that races differ in intelligence and behaviour through these genetic differences. However, in a 1993 review of Daniel Seligman's book A Question of Intelligence he wrote "I find this book pernicious because its clear purpose is to infect readers with the view that both the established schools of behavioural psychology and human genetics consider it scientifically demonstrated that group differences in black-white IQs are largely genetic in origin. Such a demonstration has not been made and Seligman probably understands that it has not."

In 1988 he wrote Thinking AIDS in collaboration with anthropologist Mary Catherine Bateson. They discussed the history of the conditions and its relation to social mores in America. They argued that a "magic bullet" against the condition would be very difficult to create, but that coercive methods to change patterns of behavior would be counterproductive.

Goldsby is also one of the authors of the Kuby Immunology textbook, the standard undergraduate textbook on immunology.

Goldsby is African-American.
