= Mia Sosa =

American novelist

Mia Sosa is an American romance novelist, best known for the 2020 novel The Worst Best Man.

== Early life ==
Sosa is half Puerto Rican and half Brazilian. Following her parents' divorce, Sosa was raised by her mother and her mother's two divorced sisters. Sosa described it as "a network of single moms" raising a pack of cousins. Sosa received her undergraduate and law degrees from Ivy League colleges, then earned a partnership in a law firm.

== Career ==
While practicing law, Sosa began writing romance novels. In 2013, after a decade in the legal field, she began writing full-time.

In 2015, one of her novels was named a finalist in the Romance Writers of America's Golden Heart Contest. The attention helped her gain a three-book contract, and her first novel, Unbuttoning the CEO, was published in December 2015.

== Writing ==
Sosa's early novels featured Latinx heroines, while The Worst Best Man, published in 2020, focused on her Brazilian heritage. Her novels often include richly drawn supporting characters. As she noted in a 2020 interview, "Relationships with family characters are a familiar theme in all my romances. Friends and family aren’t just part of the background. Incorporating them into the romance makes you see the way two people who have promised happily ever after will still interact with each other as part of a larger group. In Brazilian and Puerto Rican culture, family and tradition are a ‘thing,’ whether people screw up or not."

Her books tackle socially relevant themes, including "whitewashing in the entertainment industry," the balance "between fitness and traditional cuisine and the nature of show business," and the struggle for women of color to balance their emotions against everyone else's expectations of how they should act.

== Recognition ==
Reviewers have praised Sosa's work for its humor. A review in Kirkus Reviews noted that The Worst Best Man is "so funny you might not be able to read it in public without making snorting noises."
