= Donald deAvila Jackson =

American physician (1920 – 1968)

Donald deAvila Jackson, M.D. (January 2, 1920 – January 29, 1968) was an American psychiatrist best known for his pioneering work in family therapy.

From 1947 to 1951, he studied under Harry Stack Sullivan. From 1953 to 1962, he worked with Gregory Bateson, John Weakland, Jay Haley and William Fry, developing thinking in the areas of family therapy, brief therapy, systems theory and communication theory. One of the results of this research was the development of the double bind theory of schizophrenia.

In 1958, he founded the Mental Research Institute in Palo Alto, California, and was its first director.

Don died by accident while experimenting with possibly sodium pentothal as a form of reaching the subconscious on 29 January 1968. His death was alluded to cryptically, (often referred to as a suicide) because of the fact he was experimenting on himself.

== Quotes about Don Jackson ==
"How did Don Jackson influence the field of family therapy? How did Watts influence the steam engine? He made it. Others have refined the steam engine into a better, more efficient machine. I'd say that is what Don did for family therapy, he established the discipline. Others have gone on to refine it." — Richard Fisch, MD, Founder & Director, Brief Therapy Center, Mental Research Institute

"I miss Don. Don had a quickness and a lightness in touch that is I think very important in handling problems of human behavior. I think he might have thought that some of our antics this evening a little funny and to come up to this platform and lightened our procedures a little. It would have been nice. He was historically of course a very important person. His original paper on family homeostasis was certainly one of the first, perhaps the first major statement about the family as a system." — Gregory Bateson speaking at a memorial conference for Don Jackson

== Publications ==
- Jackson, D. (Ed.). (1960). The Etiology of Schizophrenia. NY, Basic Books.
- Jackson, D. (1964). Myths of Madness: New Facts for Old Fallacies. NY, Macmillan Pub. Co.
- Haas, A. & Jackson, D. (1967). Bulls, Bears and Dr. Freud, Mountain View, CA: World Pub.
- Watzlawick, P., Beavin, J., Jackson, D. (1967). Pragmatics of Human Communication: A Study of Interactional Patterns, Pathologies & Paradoxes. NY: W.W. Norton. Also published in Bern, Switzerland. Hans Huber, Pub., 1969.
- Jackson, D. (Ed.). (1968a). Communication, Family and Marriage (Human communication, volume 1). Palo Alto, CA: Science & Behavior Books.
- Jackson, D. (Ed.). (1968b). Therapy, Communication and Change (Human communication, volume 2). Palo Alto, CA: Science & Behavior Books.
- Lederer, W. & Jackson, D. (1968). Mirages of Marriage. NY: W.W. Norton & Co.
- Ray, W. (Ed). (2005). Don D. Jackson - Essays at the Dawn of an Era, Selected papers Vol.I. Phoenix, AZ: Zeig, Tucker, Theisan, Ltd.
- Ray, W. (Ed.). (2009). Don D. Jackson - Interactional Theory in the Practice of Therapy, Selected Papers Vol. II. Phoenix, AZ: Zeig, Tucker, Theisan, Ltd.
