= Gregory Bateson =

British-American psychological anthropologist (1904–1980)

- Rudolph Arnheim (left) and Bateson (right) speaking at the American Federation of Arts 48th Annual Convention, 6 April 1957 (photo by Eliot Elisofon); American Federation of Arts records, Archives of American Art, Smithsonian Institution
- Born: 9 May 1904; Grantchester, England
- Died: 4 July 1980 (aged 76); San Francisco, California, U.S.
- Known for: Double bind, ecology of mind, deuterolearning, schismogenesis
- Spouses: Margaret Mead (m. 1936; div. 1950) Elizabeth Sumner (m. 1951; div. 1957) Lois Cammack (m. 1961)
- Children: 5, including Mary C. Bateson
- Father: William Bateson
- Relatives: William Henry Bateson (grandfather); Anna Bateson (grandmother); Margaret Heitland (aunt); William Emerton Heitland (uncle); Anna Bateson (botanist) (aunt); Mary Bateson (aunt); Florence Margaret Durham (aunt)
- Scientific career
- Fields: Anthropology, social sciences, linguistics, cybernetics, systems theory

Gregory Bateson (9 May 1904 – 4 July 1980) was an English anthropologist, social scientist, linguist, visual anthropologist, semiotician, and cyberneticist whose work intersected that of many other fields. His writings include Steps to an Ecology of Mind (1972) and Mind and Nature (1979).

In Palo Alto, California, Bateson and his colleagues developed the double-bind theory of schizophrenia.

Bateson's interest in systems theory forms a thread running through his work. He was one of the original members of the core group of the Macy conferences in Cybernetics (1941–1960), and the later set on Group Processes (1954–1960), where he represented the social and behavioral sciences. He was interested in the relationship of these fields to epistemology. His association with the editor and author Stewart Brand helped widen his influence.

== Early life and education ==
Bateson was born in Grantchester in Cambridgeshire, England, on 9 May 1904. He was the third and youngest son of (Caroline) Beatrice Durham and the distinguished geneticist William Bateson. He was named Gregory after Gregor Mendel, the Austrian monk who founded the modern science of genetics.

The younger Bateson attended Charterhouse School from 1917 to 1921, obtained a Bachelor of Arts in biology at St. John's College, Cambridge, in 1925, and continued at Cambridge from 1927 to 1929.

According to Lipset (1982), Bateson's life was greatly affected by the death of his two brothers. John Bateson (1898–1918), the eldest of the three, was killed in World War I. Martin Bateson (1900–1922), the second brother, was then expected to follow in his father's footsteps as a scientist, but came into conflict with his father over his ambition to become a poet and playwright. The resulting stress, combined with a disappointment in love, resulted in Martin's public suicide by gunshot under the statue of Anteros in Piccadilly Circus on 22 April 1922, which was John's birthday. After this event, which transformed a private family tragedy into a public scandal, the parents' ambitious expectations fell on Gregory.

== Career ==
In 1928, Bateson lectured in linguistics at the University of Sydney. From 1931 to 1937, he was a Fellow of St. John's College, Cambridge. He spent the years before World War II in the South Pacific in New Guinea and Bali doing anthropology.

In the 1940s, he helped extend systems theory and cybernetics to the social and behavioral sciences. Although initially reluctant to join the intelligence services, Bateson served in the OSS during World War II along with dozens of other anthropologists. He was stationed in the same offices as Julia Child (then Julia McWilliams), Paul Cushing Child, and others. He spent much of the war designing 'black propaganda' radio broadcasts. He was deployed on covert operations in Burma and Thailand, and worked in China, India, and Ceylon as well. Bateson used his theory of schismogenesis to help foster discord among enemy fighters. He was upset by his wartime experience and disagreed with his wife over whether science should be applied to social planning or used only to foster understanding rather than action.

In Palo Alto, California, Bateson developed the double-bind theory, together with his non-colleagues Donald Jackson, Jay Haley and John H. Weakland, also known as the Bateson Project (1953–1963).

In 1956, he became a naturalised citizen of the United States.

Bateson was one of the original members of the core group of the Macy conferences in cybernetics (1941–1960), and the later set on Group Processes (1954–1960), where he represented the social and behavioral sciences.

In the 1970s, he taught at the Humanistic Psychology Institute in San Francisco, which was renamed the Saybrook University, and in 1972 joined the faculty of Kresge College at the University of California, Santa Cruz.

In 1976, he was elected a Fellow of the American Academy of Arts and Sciences. California Governor Jerry Brown appointed him to the Regents of the University of California, a position he held until his death, although he resigned from the Special Research Projects committee in 1979 in opposition to the university's work on nuclear weapons.

Bateson spent the last decade of his life developing a "meta-science" of epistemology to bring together the various early forms of systems theory developed in different fields of science.

== Personal life ==
From 1936 until 1950, he was married to American cultural anthropologist Margaret Mead. He applied his knowledge to the war effort before moving to the United States. Bateson and Mead had a daughter, Mary Catherine Bateson (1939–2021), who also became an anthropologist. Bateson separated from Mead in 1947, and they were divorced in 1950. In 1951, he married Elizabeth "Betty" Sumner, the daughter of the Episcopalian Bishop of Oregon, Walter Taylor Sumner. They had a son, John Sumner Bateson (1951–2015), as well as twins who died shortly after birth in 1953. Bateson and Sumner were divorced in 1957, after which Bateson was married a third time, to therapist and social worker Lois Cammack (born 1928), in 1961. They had one daughter, Nora Bateson (born 1968).

Bateson was a lifelong atheist, as his family had been for several generations. He was a member of William Irwin Thompson's esoteric Lindisfarne Association.

Bateson died on July 4, 1980, at age 76, in the guest house of the San Francisco Zen Center. The 2014 novel Euphoria by Lily King is a fictionalized account of Bateson's relationships with Mead and Reo Fortune in pre-WWII New Guinea.

== Philosophy ==
Where others might see a set of inexplicable details, Bateson perceived simple relationships. In "From Versailles to Cybernetics," Bateson argues that the history of the twentieth century can be perceived as the history of a malfunctioning relationship. In his view, the Treaty of Versailles exemplifies a whole pattern of human relationships based on betrayal and hate. He therefore claims that the Treaty of Versailles and the development of cybernetics—which for him represented the possibility of improved relationships—are the only two anthropologically important events of the twentieth century.

== Work ==
=== New Guinea ===
Bateson's beginning years as an anthropologist were spent floundering, lost without a specific objective in mind. He began in 1927 with a trip to New Guinea, spurred by his mentor A. C. Haddon. His goal, as suggested by Haddon, was to explore the effects of contact between the Sepik natives and whites. Unfortunately for Bateson, his time spent with the Baining of New Guinea was halted and difficult. The Baining were not particularly accommodating of his research, and he missed out on many communal activities. They were also not inclined to share their religious practices with him. He left the Baining frustrated. Next, he set out to study the Sulka, belonging to another native population of New Guinea. Although the Sulka were very different from the Baining and their culture was more easily observed, he felt their culture was dying, which left him dispirited and discouraged.

He experienced more success with the Iatmul people, an indigenous people living along New Guinea's Sepik River. The observations he made among the Iatmul people allowed him to develop his concept of schismogenesis. In his 1936 book Naven he defined the term, based on his Iatmul fieldwork, as "a process of differentiation in the norms of individual behaviour resulting from cumulative interaction between individuals" (p. 175). The book was named after the 'naven' rite, an honorific ceremony among the Iatmul, still continued today, that celebrates first-time cultural achievements. The ceremony entails behaviours that are otherwise forbidden in everyday social life. For example, men and women reverse and exaggerate gender roles; men dress in women's skirts, and women dress in men's attire and ornaments. Additionally, some women smear mud in the faces of other relatives, beat them with sticks, and hurl bawdy insults. Mothers may drop to the ground so their celebrated 'child' walks over them. And during a male rite, a mother's brother may slide his buttocks down the leg of his honoured sister's son, a complex gesture of masculine birthing, pride, and insult, rarely performed before women, that brings the honoured sister's son to tears. Bateson suggested the influence of a circular system of causation, and proposed that women watched:

for the spectacular performances of the men, and there can be no reasonable doubt that the presence of an audience is a very important factor in shaping the men's behavior. In fact, it is probable that the men are more exhibitionistic because the women admire their performances. Conversely, there can be no doubt that the spectacular behavior is a stimulus which summons the audience together, promoting in the women the appropriate … behavior.

In short, the behaviour of person X affects person Y, and the reaction of person Y to person X's behaviour will then affect person X's behaviour, which in turn will affect person Y, and so on. Bateson called this the "vicious circle." He then discerned two models of schismogenesis: symmetrical and complementary. Symmetrical relationships are those in which the two parties are equals, competitors, such as in sports. Complementary relationships feature an unequal balance, such as dominance-submission (parent-child), or exhibitionism-spectatorship (performer-audience). Bateson's experiences with the Iatmul led him to publish a book in 1936 titled Naven: A Survey of the Problems Suggested by a Composite Picture of the Culture of a New Guinea Tribe Drawn from Three Points of View (Cambridge University Press). The book proved to be a watershed in anthropology and modern social science.

Until Bateson published Naven, most anthropologists assumed a realist approach to studying culture, in which one simply described social reality. Bateson's book argued that this approach was naive, since an anthropologist's account of a culture was always and fundamentally shaped by whatever theory the anthropologist employed to define and analyse the data. To think otherwise, stated Bateson, was to be guilty of what Alfred North Whitehead called the "fallacy of misplaced concreteness." There was no singular or self-evident way to understand the Iatmul naven rite. Instead, Bateson analysed the rite from three unique points of view: sociological, ethological, and eidological. The book, then, was not a presentation of anthropological analysis but an epistemological account that explored the nature of anthropological analysis itself.

The sociological point of view sought to identify how the ritual helped bring about social integration. In the 1930s, most anthropologists understood marriage rules to regularly ensure that social groups renewed their alliances. But Iatmul, argued Bateson, had contradictory marriage rules. Marriage, in other words, could not guarantee that a marriage between two clans would at some definite point in the future recur. Instead, Bateson continued, the naven rite filled this function by regularly ensuring exchanges of food, valuables, and sentiment between mothers' brothers and their sisters' children, or between separate lineages. Naven, from this angle, held together the different social groups of each village into a unified whole.

The ethological point of view interpreted the ritual in terms of the conventional emotions associated with normative male and female behaviour, which Bateson called ethos. In Iatmul culture, observed by Bateson, men and women lived different emotional lives. For example, women were rather submissive and took delight in the achievements of others; men were fiercely competitive and flamboyant. During the ritual, however, men celebrated the achievements of their nieces and nephews while women were given a ritual license to act raucously. In effect, naven allowed men and women to experience momentarily the emotional lives of each other, thereby to achieve a level of psychological integration.

The third and final point of view, the eidological, was the least successful. Here Bateson endeavoured to correlate the organisational structure of the naven ceremony with the habitual patterns of Iatmul thought. Much later, Bateson would harness the very same idea in the development of the double-bind theory of schizophrenia.

In the Epilogue to the book, Bateson was clear: "The writing of this book has been an experiment, or rather a series of experiments, in methods of thinking about anthropological material." That is to say, his overall point was not to describe Iatmul culture of the naven ceremony but to explore how different modes of analysis, using different premises and analytic frameworks, could lead to different explanations of the same sociocultural phenomenon. Not only did Bateson's approach re-shape fundamentally the anthropological approach to culture, but the naven rite itself has remained a locus classicus in the discipline. In fact, the meaning of the ritual continues to inspire anthropological analysis.

=== Bali ===
Trance and Dance in Bali, a documentary by Bateson and Margaret Mead

From March 1936 until February 1938, Bateson traveled to Bali with his new wife Margaret Mead to study the people of the village of Bajoeng Gede. Here, Lipset states, "in the short history of ethnographic fieldwork, film was used both on a large scale and as the primary research tool." Bateson took 25,000 photographs of their Balinese subjects.

He discovered that the people of Bajoeng Gede raised their children very unlike children raised in Western societies. Instead of attention being paid to a child who was displaying a climax of emotion (love or anger), Balinese mothers would ignore them. Bateson notes, "The child responds to [a mother's] advances with either affection or temper, but the response falls into a vacuum. In Western cultures, such sequences lead to small climaxes of love or anger, but not so in Bali. At the moment when a child throws its arms around the mother's neck or bursts into tears, the mother's attention wanders". This model of stimulation and refusal was also seen in other areas of the culture. Bateson later described the style of Balinese relations as stasis instead of schismogenesis. Their interactions were "muted" and did not follow the schismogenetic process because they did not often escalate competition, dominance, or submission.

=== New Guinea, 1938 ===
In 1938, Bateson and Mead returned to the Sepik River, and settled in the village of Tambunum, where Bateson had spent three days in the 1920s. Their aim to replicate the Balinese project on the relationship between child-raising and temperament, and between conventions of the body – such as pose, grimace, holding infants, facial expressions, etc. – reflected wider cultural themes and values. Bateson snapped some 10,000 black and white photographs, and Mead typed thousands of pages of fieldnotes. But Bateson and Mead never published anything substantial from this research.

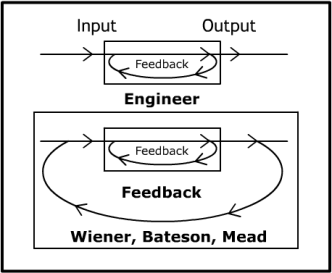
Bateson and Margaret Mead contrasted first and second-order cybernetics with this diagram in an interview in 1973.

Bateson's encounter with Mead on the Sepik river (Chapter 16) and their life together in Bali (Chapter 17) are described in Mead's autobiography Blackberry Winter: My Earlier Years (Angus and Robertson. London. 1973). Their daughter Catherine's birth in New York on 8 December 1939 is recounted in Chapter 18.

=== Double bind theory of schizophrenia ===
In 1956 in Palo Alto, Bateson and his colleagues Donald Jackson, Jay Haley, and John Weakland articulated a related theory of schizophrenia stemming from double bind situations. The double bind refers to a communication paradox described first in families with a schizophrenic member. The first place where double binds were described (though not named as such) was according to Bateson, in Samuel Butler's The Way of All Flesh (a semi-autobiographical novel about Victorian hypocrisy and cover-up).

Full double bind requires several conditions to be met:

1. The victim of double bind receives contradictory injunctions or emotional messages on different levels of communication (for example, love is expressed by words, and hate or detachment by nonverbal behaviour; or a child is encouraged to speak freely, but criticised or silenced whenever he or she actually does so).
2. No metacommunication is possible – for example, asking which of the two messages is valid or describing the communication as making no sense.
3. The victim cannot leave the communication field.
4. Failing to fulfill the contradictory injunctions is punished (for example, by withdrawal of love).

The strange behaviour and speech of schizophrenics were explained by Bateson et al. as an expression of this paradoxical situation, and were seen in fact as an adaptive response, which should be valued as a cathartic and transformative experience.

The double bind was originally presented (probably mainly under the influence of Bateson's psychiatric co-workers) as an explanation of part of the etiology of schizophrenia. Currently, it is considered to be more important as an example of Bateson's approach to the complexities of communication, which is what he understood it to be.

=== The role of somatic change in evolution ===
Bateson writes about how the actual physical changes in the body occur within evolutionary processes. He describes this through the introduction of the concept of "economics of flexibility". In his conclusion he makes seven statements or theoretical positions which may be supported by his ideology.

The first is the idea that although environmental stresses have theoretically been believed to guide or dictate the changes in the soma (physical body), the introduction of new stresses does not automatically result in the physical changes necessary for survival as suggested by original evolutionary theory. In fact, the introduction of these stresses can greatly weaken the organism. An example that he gives is the sheltering of a sick person from the weather or the fact that someone who works in an office would have a hard time working as a rock climber and vice versa. The second position states that "the economics of flexibility has a logical structure-each successive demand upon flexibility fractioning the set of available possibilities". This means that theoretically speaking each demand or variable creates a new set of possibilities. Bateson's third conclusion is "that the genotypic change commonly makes demand upon the adjustive ability of the soma". This, he states, is the commonly held belief among biologists although there is no evidence to support the claim. Added demands are made on the soma by sequential genotypic modifications in the fourth position. Through this he suggests the following three expectations:

1. The idea that organisms that have been through recent modifications will be delicate.
2. The belief that these organisms will become progressively harmful or dangerous.
3. That over time these new "breeds" will become more resistant to the stresses of the environment and changes in genetic traits.

The fifth theoretical position which Bateson believes is supported by his data is that characteristics within an organism that have been modified due to environmental stresses may coincide with genetically determined attributes. His sixth position is that it takes less economic flexibility to create somatic change than it does to cause a genotypic modification. The seventh and final theory he believes to be supported is the idea that, on rare occasions there will be populations whose changes will not be in accordance with the thesis presented within this paper. According to Bateson, none of these positions (at the time) could be tested but he called for the creation of a test which could possibly prove or disprove the theoretical positions suggested within.

=== Ecological anthropology and cybernetics ===
In his book Steps to an Ecology of Mind, Bateson applied cybernetics to the field of ecological anthropology and the concept of homeostasis. He saw the world as a series of systems containing those of individuals, societies and ecosystems. Within each system is found competition and dependency. Each of these systems has adaptive changes which depend upon feedback loops to control balance by changing multiple variables. Bateson believed that these self-correcting systems were conservative by controlling exponential slippage. He saw the natural ecological system as innately good as long as it was allowed to maintain homeostasis and that the key unit of survival in evolution was an organism and its environment.

Bateson also viewed that all three systems of the individual, society and ecosystem were all together a part of one supreme cybernetic system that controls everything instead of just interacting systems. This supreme cybernetic system is beyond the self of the individual and could be equated to what many people refer to as God, though Bateson referred to it as Mind. While Mind is a cybernetic system, it can only be distinguished as a whole and not parts. Bateson felt Mind was immanent in the messages and pathways of the supreme cybernetic system. He saw the root of the system collapse as a result of Occidental or Western epistemology. According to Bateson, consciousness is the bridge between the cybernetic networks of individuals, society and ecology and the mismatch between the systems due to improper understanding will result in the degradation of the entire supreme cybernetic system or Mind. Bateson thought that consciousness as developed through Occidental epistemology was at direct odds with Mind.

At the heart of the matter is scientific hubris. Bateson argues that Occidental epistemology perpetuates a system of understanding which is purpose or means-to-an-end driven. Purpose controls attention and narrows perception, thus limiting what comes into consciousness and therefore limiting the amount of wisdom that can be generated from the perception. Additionally, Occidental epistemology propagates the false notion that man exists outside Mind and this leads man to believe in what Bateson calls the philosophy of control based upon false knowledge.

Bateson presents Occidental epistemology as a method of thinking that leads to a mindset in which man exerts an autocratic rule over all cybernetic systems. In exerting his autocratic rule man changes the environment to suit him and in doing so he unbalances the natural cybernetic system of controlled competition and mutual dependency. The purpose-driven accumulation of knowledge ignores the supreme cybernetic system and leads to the eventual breakdown of the entire system. Bateson claims that man will never be able to control the whole system because it does not operate in a linear fashion and if man creates his own rules for the system, he opens himself up to becoming a slave to the self-made system due to the non-linear nature of cybernetics. Lastly, man's technological prowess combined with his scientific hubris gives him the potential to irrevocably damage and destroy the supreme cybernetic system, instead of just disrupting the system temporally until the system can self-correct.

Bateson argues for a position of humility and acceptance of the natural cybernetic system instead of scientific arrogance as a solution. He believes that humility can come about by abandoning the view of operating through consciousness alone. Consciousness is only one way in which to obtain knowledge and without complete knowledge of the entire cybernetic system disaster is inevitable. The limited conscious must be combined with the unconscious in a complete synthesis. Only when thought and emotion are combined in whole is man able to obtain complete knowledge. He believed that religion and art are some of the few areas in which a man acts as a whole individual in complete consciousness. By acting with this greater wisdom of the supreme cybernetic system as a whole man can change his relationship to Mind from one of schism, in which he is endlessly tied up in constant competition, to one of complementarity. Bateson argues for a culture that promotes the most general wisdom and is able to flexibly change within the supreme cybernetic system.

=== Other terms used by Bateson ===
- Abductive Process. Originally coined by American philosopher/logician Charles Sanders Peirce, abduction refers to the process by which scientific hypotheses are generated (along with induction and deduction). Bateson, however, thought of "abductive process" very differently. For Bateson, abductive process is the way one context becomes a description of another: "Every abduction may be seen as a double or multiple description of some object or event or sequence." Bateson often used abductive process as a way to compare patterns of relationship and their symmetry or asymmetry (as in, for example, comparative anatomy), especially in complex organic (or mental) systems.
- Conscious Purpose. In a series of papers and talks during the late 1960s, Bateson formulated an argument that there was a deep-seated mismatch between the complex, cybernetic, self-corrective loop processes of nature and the linear, causal, selective problem-solving that characterizes much human activity. Bateson referred to this as "conscious purpose" – the tendency to "follow the shortest logical or causal path" to addressing a problem, or in reaching a desired goal.
- Creatura and Pleroma. Borrowed from Carl Jung who applied these gnostic terms in his "Seven Sermons To the Dead". Like the Hindu term maya, the basic idea captured in this distinction is that meaning and organisation are projected onto the world. Pleroma refers to the non-living world that is undifferentiated by subjectivity; Creatura to the living world, subject to perceptual difference, distinction, and information.
- Criteria of Mental Process (i.e. Mind)
1. A mind is an aggregate of interacting parts or components.
2. The interaction between parts of the mind is triggered by difference...
3. Mental process requires collateral energy.
4. Mental process requires circular (or more complex) chains of determination.
5. In the mental process the effects of difference are to be regarded as transforms (that is, coded versions) of the difference which preceded them.
6. The description and classification of these processes of transformation disclose a hierarchy of logical types immanent in the phenomena.
- Deuterolearning. A term which Bateson coined in the 1940s referring to the organisation of learning, or learning to learn:
- Information – Bateson defined information as "a difference which makes a difference". This summary, however, is taken out of context and lacks Bateson's reference to the requirement of energy to make a difference, and his definition of a difference as a matter that can be abstract also. For Bateson, information in fact mediated Alfred Korzybski's map–territory relation, and thereby resolved, according to Bateson, the mind-body problem.
- Plateau - a continuing state of intensity without climactic sequences.
- Schismogenesis – the emergence of divisions within social groups.

=== Continuing extensions of his work ===
In 1984, his daughter Mary Catherine Bateson published a joint biography of her parents (Bateson and Margaret Mead).

His other daughter the filmmaker Nora Bateson released An Ecology of Mind, a documentary that premiered at the Vancouver International Film Festival. This film was selected as the audience favourite with the Morton Marcus Documentary Feature Award at the 2011 Santa Cruz Film Festival, and honoured with the 2011 John Culkin Award for Outstanding Praxis in the Field of Media Ecology by the Media Ecology Association.

The Bateson Idea Group (BIG) initiated a web presence in October 2010. The group collaborated with the American Society for Cybernetics for a joint meeting in July 2012 at the Asilomar Conference Grounds in California.

The modern view of artificial intelligence based on social machines has deep links to Bateson's ecological perspectives of intelligence.

Bateson's work has been a major influence on the emerging interdisciplinary field of social choreography.

== Bibliography ==
Books

- Bateson, G. (1965) [1936]. Naven: A Survey of the Problems suggested by a Composite Picture of the Culture of a New Guinea Tribe drawn from Three Points of View. Stanford University Press.
- Bateson, G. (2000) [1972]. Steps to an Ecology of Mind: Collected Essays in Anthropology, Psychiatry, Evolution, and Epistemology. University of Chicago Press. ISBN 9780226039053.
- Bateson, G. (2002) [1979]. Mind and Nature: A Necessary Unity. Hampton Press. ISBN 9781572734340.
- Bateson, G. (2023) [1991]. A Sacred Unity: Further Steps to an Ecology of Mind. Triarchy Press. ISBN 9781913743796.
- Bateson, G. (2026). Guddemi, Phillip (ed.). Gregory Bateson’s ‘Ecology of Mind’ – The Course. Triarchy Press. ISBN 9781917251211.
- Bateson, G.; Bateson, M.C. (2005) [1987]. Angels Fear: Towards an Epistemology of the Sacred. Hampton Press. ISBN 9781572735941.
- Bateson, G.; Mead, M. (1985) [1942]. Balinese Character: A Photographic Analysis. Special Publications of the New York Academy of Sciences, Vol. 2. New York Academy of Sciences. ISBN 9780890727805.
- Hall, Robert A.; Bateson, G.; Mead, Margaret; Kaberry, Phyllis M.; Reed, Stephen W.; Whiting, John W.M. (1943). Melanesian Pidgin English: Grammar, Texts, Vocabulary. Special Publications of the Linguistic Society of America. Linguistic Society of America at the Waverly Press, Inc.
- Hall, Robert A.; Bateson, G.; Whiting, John W.M.; Linguistic Society of America; United States Armed Forces Institute (1943). Melanesian Pidgin English, Short Grammar and Vocabulary: With Grammatical Introduction. Special Publications of the Linguistic Society of America. Linguistic Society of America at the Waverly Press, Inc.
- Perceval, John (1974) [1961]. Bateson, G. (ed.). Perceval's Narrative: A Patient's Account of His Psychosis, 1830-1832. Stanford University Press.
- Ruesch, Jurgen; Bateson, G. (2008) [1951]. Pinsker, Eve C.; Combs, Gene (eds.). Communication: The Social Matrix of Psychiatry. Routledge. doi:10.4324/9781315080932. ISBN 9781351527590.

Books about or related to Gregory Bateson

- Bateson, M.C. (2001) [1984]. With a Daughter's Eye: A Memoir of Margaret Mead and Gregory Bateson. HarperCollins.
- Bateson, M.C. (2004) [1972]. Our Own Metaphor: A Personal Account of a Conference on the Effects of Conscious Purpose on Human Adaptation. Hampton Press.
- Bateson, N.; Jaworska-Witkowska, M., eds. (2017). Batesoniana Polonica I: Towards an ecology of mind: Batesonian legacy continued. Wyższej Szkoły Biznesu w Dabrowie Górniczej.
- Bertrando, Paolo; Bianciardi, Marco, eds. (2009). La natura sistemica dell'uomo : attualità del pensiero di Gregory Bateson. R. Cortina. ISBN 9788860302748.
- Bowers, C.A. (2011). Perspectives on the Ideas of Gregory Bateson, Ecological Intelligence, and Educational Reforms. Eco-Justice Press. ISBN 9780966037005.
- Breen, Benjamin (2024). Tripping on Utopia: Margaret Mead, the Cold War, and the Troubled Birth of Psychedelic Science. Grand Central Publishing. ISBN 9781538722374.
- Brockman, J., ed. (1977). About Bateson. E.P. Dutton. ISBN 9780525474692.
- Brunello, Stefano (1992). Gregory Bateson: verso una scienza eco-genetica dei sistemi viventi. Edizioni GB.
- Chaney, A. (2017). Runaway: Gregory Bateson, the Double Bind, and the Rise of Ecological Consciousness. The University of North Carolina Press. ISBN 9781469631738.
- Charlton, N.G. (2008). Understanding Gregory Bateson: Mind, Beauty, and the Sacred Earth. State University of New York Press.
- Deriu, Marco (2000). Gregory Bateson. Bruno Mondadori. ISBN 9788842494065.
- Flemons, D.G. (2001). Completing Distinctions: Interweaving the Ideas of Gregory Bateson and Taoism into a Unique Approach to Therapy. Shambala Publications.
- Geertz, H. (1994). Images of Power: Balinese Paintings Made for Gregory Bateson and Margaret Mead. University of Hawaii Press.
- Greppi, Alessandra (1993). Giochi con carte truccate: La tautologia in Gregory Bateson. A. Pellicani.
- Guddemi, P. (2020). Gregory Bateson on Relational Communication: From Octopuses to Nations. Biosemiotics. Vol. 20. Springer. doi:10.1007/978-3-030-52101-1. ISBN 978-3-030-52100-4. S2CID 222119393.
- Harries-Jones, P. (1995). A Recursive Vision: Ecological Understanding and Gregory Bateson. University of Toronto Press.
- Harries-Jones, P. (2016). Upside-Down Gods: Gregory Bateson's World of Difference. Fordham University Press. ISBN 9780823270361.
- Hoffmeyer, J., ed. (2008). A Legacy for Living Systems: Gregory Bateson as Precursor to Biosemiotics. Vol. 2. Springer. doi:10.1007/978-1-4020-6706-8. ISBN 978-1-4020-6705-1.
- Jaworska-Witkowska, M.; Witkowski, L., eds. (2016). Humanistyczne wyzwania ekologii umysłu: Gregory Bateson w Polsce. Fundacja na rzecz myślenia im.
- Keeney, Bradford (1983). Aesthetics of Change. Guilford Press. ISBN 0898620430.
- Kessel, Ralph (1971). Logic and Social Structure: A critical revaluation of Bateson's Naven: the Iatmul tribe of New Guinea. University of Northern Colorado Museum of Anthropology. LCCN 80500428.
- Kirschenbaum, H.; Henderson, V.L., eds. (1989). Carl Rogers: Dialogues : Conversations with Martin Buber, Paul Tillich, B.F. Skinner, Gregory Bateson, Michael Polanyi, Rollo May, and Others. Houghton, Mifflin and Company.
- Lipset, D. (1982). Gregory Bateson: The Legacy of a Scientist. Beacon Press.
- Manghi, Sergio (1994). Attraverso Bateson: Ecologia della mente e relazioni sociali. Anabasi. ISBN 8841750200.
- Possamai, Tiziano (2009). Dove il pensiero esita. Gregory Bateson e il doppio vincolo. Edizioni Ombre Corte.
- Possamai, Tiziano (2022). Where Thought Hesitates. Gregory Bateson and the Double Bind. Mimesis International.
- Ramage, Marcus; Shipp, Karen, eds. (2009). Systems Thinkers. Springer Verlag.
- Rieber, R.W., ed. (1989). The Individual, Communication, and Society: Essays in Memory of Gregory Bateson. Cambridge University Press.
- Sullivan, G. (1999). Margaret Mead, Gregory Bateson, and Highland Bali : Fieldwork Photographs of Bayung Gede, 1936-1939. University of Chicago Press.
- Van Den Eede, Y. (2019). The Beauty of Detours: A Batesonian Philosophy of Technology. SUNY Press. ISBN 9781438477114. LCCN 2019011364.
- Watras, Joseph (2015). Philosophies of environmental education and democracy: Harris, Dewey, and Bateson on human freedoms in nature. Palgrave Macmillan. ISBN 9781137484208. LCCN 2015490488.
- Wilder-Mott, C.; Weakland, J.H., eds. (1981). Rigor and Imagination: Essays From the Legacy of Gregory Bateson. Praeger Publishing.
- Winkin, Yves, ed. (1981). La nouvelle communication. Seuil.
- Winkin, Yves, ed. (1988). Bateson: Premier état d'un héritage: Colloque de Cerisy. Seuil.
- Zoletto, Davide (2001). Pensiero e scrittura del doppio legame: a partire da Bateson. Edizioni Università di Trieste. ISBN 888303077X. LCCN 2002450975.

Published works

- Albrecht-Carrié, R.; Bateson, G. (1946). "From One Social Scientist to Another". American Scientist. 34 (4): 648–536, 538, 540, 542, 544, 546–548, 550. JSTOR 27826127.
- Bateson, G. (1931). "48. Head Hunting on the Sepik River". Man. 31: 49. doi:10.2307/2789539. ISSN 0025-1496. JSTOR 2789539.
- Bateson, G. (1931). "119. Review: Orokaiva Society by F.E. Williams". Man. 31: 114–115. doi:10.2307/2789055. JSTOR 2789055.
- Bateson, G. (1932). "Further Notes on a Snake Dance of the Baining". Oceania. 2 (3): 334–341. doi:10.1002/j.1834-4461.1932.tb00032.x. ISSN 0029-8077.
- Bateson, G. (1932). "Social Structure of the Iatmül People of the Sepik River, Parts I-II". Oceania. 2 (3): 245–291. doi:10.1002/j.1834-4461.1932.tb00029.x.
- Bateson, G. (1932). "Social Structure of the Iatmül People of the Sepik River, Parts III-VI". Oceania. 2 (4): 401–453. doi:10.1002/j.1834-4461.1932.tb00042.x.
- Bateson, G. (1934). "Field Work in Social Psychology in New Guinea". Congrès International des Sciences Anthropologiques et Ethnologiques: Compte-rendu de la première Session, Londres. Institut royal d'anthropologie. p. 153.
- Bateson, G. (1934). "Ritual Transvesticism on the Sepik River, New Guinea". Congrès International des Sciences Anthropologiques et Ethnologiques: Compte-rendu de la première Session, Londres. Institut royal d'anthropologie. pp. 274–275.
- Bateson, G. (1934). "The Segmentation of Society". Congrès International des Sciences Anthropologiques et Ethnologiques: Compte-rendu de la première Session, Londres. Institut royal d'anthropologie. p. 187.
- Bateson, G. (1934). "130. Personal Names among the Iatmul Tribe (Sepik River)". Man. 34: 109–110. doi:10.2307/2790916. JSTOR 2790916.
- Bateson, G. (1934). "Psychology and War: Tendencies of Early Man". The Times. p. 12.
- Bateson, G. (1935). "Music in New Guinea". The Eagle. 48 (214): 158–170.
- Bateson, G. (1935). "199. Culture Contact and Schismogenesis". Man. 35: 178–183. doi:10.2307/2789408. ISSN 0025-1496. JSTOR 2789408.
- Bateson, G. (1936). "41. Review of "Reports of the Cambridge Anthropological Expedition to Torres Straits, Vol 1: General Ethnography" by A.C. Haddon". Man. 36: 35–36. JSTOR 2791202.
- Bateson, G. (1936). "47. Culture Contact and Schismogenesis (Cf. Man, 1935, 199)". Man. 36: 38. JSTOR 2791208.
- Bateson, G. (1936). "116. A Carved Wooden Statuette from the Sepik River, New Guinea (cf. Man, 935, 161)". Man. 36: 88. JSTOR 2789904.
- Bateson, G. (1937). "An Old Temple and a New Myth". Djawa. 17 (5–6): 291–307.
- Bateson, G. (1941). Age Conflicts and Radical Youth. Institute for Intercultral Studies.
- Bateson, G. (1941). "Experiments in Thinking about Observed Ethnological Material". Philosophy of Science. 8 (1): 53–68. doi:10.1086/286669. JSTOR 184365. S2CID 119563832.
- Bateson, G. (1941). "Review of Conditioning and Learning by Ernest R. Hilgard and Donald G. Marquis". American Anthropologist. New Series. 43 (1): 115–116. doi:10.1525/aa.1941.43.1.02a00270. JSTOR 663007.
- Bateson, G. (1941). "Review of Mathematico-Deductive Theory of Rote Learning: a Study in Scientific Methodology by Clark L. Hull, Carl I Hovland, Robert T. Ross, Marshall Hall, Donald T. Perkins & Frederic B. Fitch". American Anthropologist. New Series. 43 (1): 116–118. doi:10.1525/aa.1941.43.1.02a00280. JSTOR 663008.
- Bateson, G. (1941). "The Frustration-Aggression Hypothesis and Culture". Psychological Review. 48 (4): 350–355. doi:10.1037/h0055948. ISSN 0033-295X.
- Bateson, G. (1942). "Announcement: Council on Human Relations (15 West 77th Street, New York City)". Applied Anthropology. 1 (2): 66–67. JSTOR 44135385.
- Bateson, G. (1942). "Comment on "The Comparative Study of Culture and the Purposive Cultivation of Democratic Values" by Margaret Mead". In Bryson, Lyman; Finkelstein, Louis (eds.). Science, Philosophy, and Religion: Second Symposium. Conference on Science, Philosophy and Religion in Their Relation to the Democratic Way of Life. New York: Conference on Science, Philosophy and Religion in Their Relation to the Democratic Way of Life, Inc. pp. 81–97.
- Bateson, G. (1942). "Morale and National Character". In Watson, Goodwin (ed.). Civilian Morale: Second Yearbook of the Society for the Psychological Study of Social Issues. Boston: Houghton-Mifflin Co. (for Reynal & Hitchcock, New York). pp. 71–91.
- Bateson, G. (1942). "Notes and News". American Anthropologist. New Series. 44 (2): 334–336. doi:10.1525/aa.1942.44.2.02a00280. JSTOR 663045.
- Bateson, G. (1942). "50. The Council on Human Relations". Man. 42: 93–94. JSTOR 2792740.
- Bateson, G. (1942). "Council on Intercultural Relations". Character and Personality. 11 (1): 83–84.
- Bateson, G. (1942). "Review of The Ageless Indies by Raymond Kennedy". Natural History. 50 (2): 109.
- Bateson, G. (1942). "Some Systematic Approaches to the Study of Culture and Personality". Character and Personality. 11 (1): 76–82. doi:10.1111/j.1467-6494.1942.tb01919.x.
- Bateson, G. (1942). "Note requesting "materials on the existing stereotypes and attitudes of the American people toward the cultures and the individual members of countries engaged in the present war."". Psychological Bulletin. 39 (8): 670.
- Bateson, G. (1943). An Analysis of the film "Hitlerjunge Quex" (1933).
- Bateson, G. (1943). "Human Dignity and the Varieties of Civilization". In Bryson, Lymon; Finkelstein, Louis (eds.). Science, Philosophy and Religion: Third Symposium. Conference on Science, Philosophy and Religion in Their Relation to the Democratic Way of Life. pp. 245–255.
- Bateson, G. (1943). "Cultural and Thematic Analysis of Fictional Films". Transactions of the New York Academy of Sciences. 2. 5 (4): 72–78. doi:10.1111/j.2164-0947.1943.tb00868.x.
- Bateson, G. (1943). "Discussion: The Science of Decency". Philosophy of Science. 10 (2): 140–142. doi:10.1086/286802. JSTOR 184297. S2CID 123638395.
- Bateson, G. (1943). "Remarks in "Psychology—In the War and After, Part II: Comments on General Course in Psychology" by Louise Omwake". Junior College Journal. 14 (1): 20.
- Bateson, G. (1944). "Cultural Determinants of Personality". In Hunt, JMV (ed.). Personality and Behavior Disorders: A Handbook Based on Experimental and Clinical Research. Vol. 2. The Ronald Press Company. pp. 714–735.
- Bateson, G. (1944). "Pidgin English and Cross-Cultural Communication". Transactions of the New York Academy of Sciences. 2. 6 (4): 137–141. doi:10.1111/j.2164-0947.1944.tb00109.x. ISSN 0028-7113.
- Bateson, G. (1944). "Psychology—In the War and After (VII): Material on Contemporary Peoples". Junior College Journal. 14 (7): 308–311.
- Bateson, G. (1944). "Psychology—In the War and After (VIII): Use of Film Material in Studying Peoples". Junior College Journal. 14 (9): 427–429.
- Bateson, G. (1946). "Arts of the South Seas". The Art Bulletin. 28 (2): 119–123. doi:10.2307/3047063. ISSN 0004-3079. JSTOR 3047063.
- Bateson, G. (1946). "Discussion (of "Some Relationships Between Maturation and Acculturation," by Arnold Gesell; "Cultural Patterning of Maturation in Selected Primitive Societies," by Margaret Mead; and "Environment vs. Race—Environment as an Etiological Factor in Psychiatric Disturbances in Infancy," by Renfe A. Spitz and Kathe M. Wolf)". The Journal of Nervous and Mental Disease. 103 (5): 521–522.
- Bateson, G. (1946). "Physical Thinking and Social Problems". Science. 103 (2686): 717–718. Bibcode:1946Sci...103..717B. doi:10.1126/science.103.2686.717. ISSN 0036-8075. PMID 17842994.
- Bateson, G. (8 December 1946). "Protecting the Future: Aiding the Work of Scientists Is Believed Best Safeguard". The New York Times. pp. 10–.
- Bateson, G. (1946). "Review of Man, Morals and Society, by John Carl Flugel". Psychosomatic Medicine. 8 (5): 363–364. doi:10.1097/00006842-194609000-00012.
- Bateson, G. (1 September 1946). "The Pattern of an Armaments Race: An Anthropological Approach—Part 1". Bulletin of the Atomic Scientists. 2 (5–6): 10–16. doi:10.1080/00963402.1946.11458021. ISSN 0096-3402.
- Bateson, G. (1 October 1946). "The Pattern of an Armaments Race—Part II: An Analysis of Nationalism". Bulletin of the Atomic Scientists. 2 (7–8): 26–29. doi:10.1080/00963402.1946.11458036. ISSN 0096-3402.
- Bateson, G. (1947). "Atoms, Nations, and Cultures". International House Quarterly. 11 (2): 47–50.
- Bateson, G. (1947). "Comments on "In Quest of an Heuristic Approach to the Study of Mankind" by Laura Thompson". In Bryson, Lymon; Finkelstein, Louis; MacIver, R.M. (eds.). Approaches to Group Understanding: Sixth Symposium. Sixth Symposium of the Conference on Science, Philosophy and Religion. Conference on Science, Philosophy and Religion in Their Relation to the Democratic Way of Life, Inc. pp. 510–512–513.
- Bateson, G. (1947). "Review of The Theory of Human Culture, by James Feibleman". Political Science Quarterly. 62 (3): 428–430. doi:10.2307/2144299. ISSN 0032-3195. JSTOR 2144299.
- Bateson, G. (1947). "Sex and Culture". Annals of the New York Academy of Sciences. 47 (5): 647–660. Bibcode:1947NYASA..47..647B. doi:10.1111/j.1749-6632.1947.tb31729.x. S2CID 83994228.
- Bateson, G. (1949). "Bali: The Value System of a Steady State". In Fortes, Meyer (ed.). Social Structure: Studies Presented to A.R. Radcliffe-Brown. Clarendon Press. pp. 35–53.
- Bateson, G. (1949). "Panelist comments in "An Open Forum on the Exhibition of Illusionism and Trompe L'Oeil"". Bulletin of the California Palace of the Legion of Honor. 7 (3–4): 14–35.
- Bateson, G. (8 November 1949). "Remarks in "Modern Art Argument" (Report on the Western Round Table on Modern Art, April 8-10, 1949, San Francisco)". Look. Vol. 13, no. 23. pp. 80–83.
- Bateson, G. (1950). "Conference remarks". In von Foerster, H. (ed.). Cybernetics: Circular Causal and Feedback Mechanisms in Biological and Social Systems; Transactions of the Sixth Conference, March 24–25, 1949. Conference on Cybernetics. Josiah Macy, Jr. Foundation. pp. 14–23, 57, 75, 76, 85, 89, 138, 152, 154, 157, 161, 164, 165, 181, 182, 185, 189, 200, 201, 206.
- Bateson, G. (1950). "Cultural Ideas about Aging". In Jones, H.E. (ed.). Research on Aging: Proceedings of a Conference held on August .7-10, 1950, at the University of California, Berkeley. Social Science Research Council; Pacific Coast Committee on Old Age Research. Social Science Research Council. pp. 49–54.
- Bateson, G. (1951). "Conference remarks". In von Foerster, H.; Mead, M.; Teuber, H.L. (eds.). Cybernetics: Circular Causal and Feedback Mechanisms in Biological and Social Systems; Transactions of the Seventh Conference, March 23–24, 1950. Conference on Cybernetics. Josiah Macy, Jr. Foundation. pp. 13–26, 27, 44, 49, 78, 113, 140, 149, 150, 164, 165, 166, 169, 171, 182, 184, 185, 196, 201, 204, 222, 231, 232.
- Bateson, G. (1951). "Conventions of Communication: Where Validity Depends upon Belief". Communication: The Social Matrix of Psychiatry. By Ruesch, Jurgen; Bateson, G. W.W. Norton. pp. 212–227.
- Bateson, G. (1951). "Information and Codification: A Philosophical Approach". Communication: The Social Matrix of Psychiatry. By Ruesch, Jurgen; Bateson, G. W.W. Norton. pp. 168–211.
- Bateson, G. (1951). "Metalogue: Why do Frenchmen?". In Van Tuyl, M. (ed.). Impulse: Annual of Contemporary Dance, 1951. Impulse Publications. pp. 21–24.
- Bateson, G. (1951). "Psychiatric Thinking: An Epistemological Approach". Communication: The Social Matrix of Psychiatry. By Ruesch, Jurgen; Bateson, G. W.W. Norton. pp. 228–256.
- Bateson, G. (1951). "The Convergence of Science and Psychiatry". Communication: The Social Matrix of Psychiatry. By Ruesch, Jurgen; Bateson, G. W.W. Norton. pp. 257–272.
- Bateson, G. (1952). "Applied Metalinguistics and International Relations". ETC: A Review of General Semantics. 10 (1): 71–73. JSTOR 42581023.
- Bateson, G. (1953). "An Analysis of the Nazi Film Hitlerjunge Quex". In Mead, M.; Metraux, R. (eds.). The Study of Culture at a Distance. University of Chicago Press. pp. 302–314.
- Bateson, G. (1953). "Formulation of End Linkage". In Mead, M.; Metraux, R. (eds.). The Study of Culture at a Distance. University of Chicago Press. pp. 367–378.
- Bateson, G. (1953). "Metalogue: About Games and Being Serious". ETC: A Review of General Semantics. 10 (3): 213–217. JSTOR 42581090.
- Bateson, G. (1953). "Metalogue: Daddy, How Much Do You Know?". ETC: A Review of General Semantics. 10 (4): 311–315. JSTOR 42581370.
- Bateson, G. (1953). "Metalogue: Why Do Things Have Outlines?". ETC: A Review of General Semantics. 11 (1): 59–63. JSTOR 42581122.
- Bateson, G. (1953). "The Position of Humor in Human Communication". In von Foerster, H.; Mead, M.; Teuber, H.L. (eds.). Cybernetics: Circular causal and feedback mechanisms in biological and social systems, Transactions of the Ninth Conference, March 20–21, 1952. Conference on Cybernetics. Josiah Macy, Jr. Foundation. pp. 1–47.
- Bateson, G. (1954). "Why a Swan? — A Metalogue". In Van Tuyl, M. (ed.). Impulse, Annual of Contemporary Dance, 1954. Impulse Publications. pp. 23–26.
- Bateson, G. (1955). A Theory of Play and Fantasy: A Report on Theoretical Aspects of the Project of Study of the Role of Paradoxes of Abstraction in Communication. Approaches to the Study of Human Personality: Psychiatric Research Reports. American Psychiatric Association. pp. 39–51.
- Bateson, G. (1955). "How the Deviant Sees His Society". In Branch, C.H.H. (ed.). The Epidemiology of Mental Health: An Institute, Brighton, Utah, 1955. Papers and Summary of Discussions. The Epidemiology of Mental Health: An Institute sponsored by the Departments of Psychiatry and Psychology of the University of Utah and by the Veterans Administration Hospital, Fort Douglas Division, Salt Lake City, UT. Brighton, UT: University of Utah. pp. 25–31.
- Bateson, G. (1956). "Autobiographical sketch". In Schaffner, B. (ed.). Group Processes: Transactions of the Second Conference, October 9-12, 1955, Princeton, New Jersey. Josiah Macy, Jr. Foundation. pp. 11–12.
- Bateson, G. (1956). "Communication in Occupational Therapy". American Journal of Occupational Therapy. 10 (4, Part II): 188. PMID 13339893.
- Bateson, G. (1956). "The Message "This is Play."". In Schaffner, B. (ed.). Group Processes: Transactions of the Second Conference, October 9-12, 1955, Princeton, New Jersey. Josiah Macy, Jr. Foundation. pp. 145–242.
- Bateson, G. (1957). "Autobiographical sketch". In Schaffner, B. (ed.). Group Processes: Transactions of the Third Conference, October 7-10, 1956, Princeton, NJ. Josiah Macy, Jr. Foundation. p. 9.
- Bateson, G. (1957). "Conference remarks". In Mitchell, D. (ed.). Conference on Perception and Personality. Conference on Perception and Personality. Beverly Hills, CA: Hacker Foundation. pp. 10, 42–43, 44, 45, 51, 62, 71, 85, 90, 92–93, 97, 112, 113, 114–115, 116, 117, 118, 119, 134, 135.
- Bateson, G. (1958). "Analysis of Group Therapy in an Admission Ward, United States Naval Hospital, Oakland, California". In Wilmer, H.A. (ed.). Social Psychiatry in Action: A Therapeutic Community. Charles C. Thomas. pp. 334–349.
- Bateson, G. (1958). "Language and Psychotherapy—Frieda Fromm-Reichmann's Last Project". Psychiatry. 21 (1): 96–100. doi:10.1080/00332747.1958.11023118. ISSN 0033-2747.
- Bateson, G. (1958). "Schizophrenic Distortions of Communication". In Whitaker, C.A. (ed.). Psychotherapy of Chronic Schizophrenic Patients. Sea Island Conference on Psychotherapy of Chronic Schizophrenic Patients, sponsored by Little, Brown & Co. Sea Island, GA: Little, Brown. pp. 31–56.
- Bateson, G. (17 September 1958). "The New Conceptual Frames for Behavioral Research". Proceedings of the Sixth Annual Psychiatric Institute. Sixth Annual Psychiatric Institute. New Jersey Neuro-Psychiatric Institute, Princeton, NJ. pp. 54–71.
- Bateson, G. (1959). "Autobiographical sketch". In Schaffner, B. (ed.). Group Processes: Transactions of the Fourth Conference, October 13–16, 1957, Princeton NJ. Conference on Group Processes. Josiah Macy, Jr. Foundation. pp. 13–14.
- Bateson, G. (1959). "Cultural Problems Posed by a Study of Schizophrenic Process". In Auerback, A. (ed.). Schizophrenia: An Integrated Approach. Symposium on Schizoprenia. American Psychiatric Association symposium of the Hawaiian Divisional Meeting, 1958, San Francisco, CA: Ronald Press Co. pp. 125–148.
- Bateson, G. (30 January 1959). "Letter in response to "Role and Status of Anthropological Theories" by Sidney Morganbesser". Science. 129 (3344): 294–298. doi:10.1126/science.129.3344.294-a. ISSN 0036-8075. PMID 17795225.
- Bateson, G. (1959). "Panel Review". In Masserman, J.H. (ed.). Individual and Familial Dynamics. Science and Psychoanalysis. Vol. 2. Grune & Stratton. pp. 207–211.
- Bateson, G. (1959). "Remarks in "Memorial to Dr. Fromm-Reichmann"". In Schaffner, B. (ed.). Group Processes: Transactions of the Fourth Conference, October 13–16, 1957, Princeton NJ. Conference on Group Processes. Josiah Macy, Jr. Foundation. p. 7.
- Bateson, G. (1960). "Conference remarks". In Schaffner, B. (ed.). Group Processes: Transactions of the Fifth Conference, October 12–15, 1958, Princeton NJ. Conference on Group Processes. Josiah Macy, Jr. Foundation. pp. 12, 14, 20, 21, 22, 34, 35, 54, 56, 57, 61, 63, 65, 66, 96, 108–109, 120, 124, 125, 177.
- Bateson, G. (1960). "Conference remarks". In Abramson, H.A. (ed.). The Use of LSD in Psychotherapy: Transactions of a Conference on d-Lysergic Acid Diethylamide (LSD-25), April 22–24, 1959, Princeton NJ. Conference on d-Lysergic Acid Diethylamide (LSD-25). Josiah Macy, Jr. Foundation. pp. 10, 19, 25, 28, 35–36, 37, 39–40, 48, 51, 58, 61, 62, 88, 98, 100, 117, 134, 155, 156, 158, 159, 162, 163, 164, 165, 183, 185, 187–188, 189, 190, 191–192, 193, 210, 211, 213, 214, 218, 222, 225, 231, 234–235, 235.
- Bateson, G. (1960). "Discussion of "Families of Schizophrenic and of Well Children; Method, Concepts and Some Results" by Samuel J. Beck". American Journal of Orthopsychiatry. 30 (2): 263–266.
- Bateson, G. (1 May 1960). "Minimal Requirements for a Theory of Schizophrenia". A.M.A. Archives of General Psychiatry. 2 (5): 477–491. doi:10.1001/archpsyc.1960.03590110001001. ISSN 0003-990X. PMID 13797500.
- Bateson, G. (1960). "The Group Dynamics of Schizophrenia". In Appleby, Lawrence; Scher, Jordan M.; Cumming, John (eds.). Chronic Schizophrenia: Explorations in Theory and Treatment. Institute on Chronic Schizoprhenia and Hospital Treatment Programs. State Hospital, Osawatomie, KS: Free Press. pp. 90–105.
- Bateson, G. (1961). "Formal Research in Family Structure". In Ackerman, Nathan W.; Beatman, Frances L.; Sherman, Sanford N. (eds.). Exploring the Base for Family Therapy. M. Robert Gomberg Memorial Conference. New York Academy of Medicine, New York, NY: Family Service Association of America. pp. 136–140.
- Bateson, G. (1961). Introduction. Perceval's Narrative: A Patient's Account of His Psychosis, 1830-1832. By Perceval, John. Bateson, G. (ed.). Stanford University Press. pp. v–xxii.
- Bateson, G. (1961). "The Biosocial Integration of Behavior in the Schizophrenic Family". In Ackerman, N.W.; Beatman, F.L.; Sherman, S.N. (eds.). Exploring the Base for Family Therapy. M. Robert Gomberg Memorial Conference. New York Academy of Medicine, New York, NY: Family Service Association of America. pp. 116–122.
- Bateson, G. (1963). "A Social Scientist Views the Emotions". In Knapp, Peter H. (ed.). Expression of the Emotions in Man. Symposium on Expression of the Emotions of Man, Meeting of the American Association for the Advancement of Science. New York: International Universities Press. pp. 230–236.
- Bateson, G. (1963). "Exchange of Information About Patterns of Human Behavior". In Fields, William S.; Abbott, Walter (eds.). Information Storage and Neural Control. Houston Neurological Society Tenth Annual Scientific Meeting. Charles C. Thomas. pp. 173–186.
- Bateson, G. (24 December 1963). "The Role of Somatic Change in Evolution". Evolution. 17 (4): 529–539. doi:10.2307/2407104. ISSN 0014-3820. JSTOR 2407104.
- Bateson, G. (1964). "Patient Therapist Dialogue with Interpretation". An Anthology of Human Communication, Text and Tape. By Wazlawick, Paul. Science and Behavior Books. pp. 36–37.
- Bateson, G. (1964). Preface. An Anthology of Human Communication, Text and Tape. By Watzlawick, Paul. Science and Behavior Books. pp. iv–iv.
- Bateson, G. (1965). "Communication Among the Higher Vertebrates (Abstract)". Proceedings of the Hawaiian Academy of Sciences, Fortieth Annual Meeting, 1964-1965. Hawaiian Academy of Sciences, 40th Annual Meeting. University of Hawaii Press.
- Bateson, G. (1966). "Communication Theories in Relation to the Etiology of the Neuroses". In Merin, Joseph H.; Nagler, Simon H. (eds.). The Etiology of the Neuroses. Symposium sponsored by The Society of Medical Psychoanalysts, March 17–18, 1962, New York. Science and Behavior Books. pp. 28–35.
- Bateson, G. (1966). "Problems in Cetacean and Other Mammalian Communication". In Norris, Kenneth S. (ed.). Whales, Dolphins, and Porpoises. University of California Press. pp. 569–579.
- Bateson, G. (1966). "Slippery Theories. Comment on "Family Interaction and Schizophrenia: A Review of Current Theories" by Elliot G. Mishler and Nancy E. Waxler". International Journal of Psychiatry. 2: 415–417.
- Bateson, G. (1966). "Threads in the Cybernetic Pattern". Proceedings from The Cybernetics Revolution Symposium. The Cybernetics Revolution Symposium sponsored by The Symposia Committee, Associated Students of the University of Hawaii. University of Hawaii, Honolulu: The Symposia Committee of the Associated Students of the University of Hawaii.
- Bateson, G. (28 July 1967). "Consciousness versus nature". Peace News. No. 1622. p. 10.
- Bateson, G. (1 April 1967). "Cybernetic Explanation". The American Behavioral Scientist. 10 (8): 29–32. doi:10.1177/0002764201000808. S2CID 220678731.
- Bateson, G. (1967). "Review of Person, Time, and Conduct in Bali: An Essay in Cultural Analysis by Clifford Geertz". American Anthropologist. New Series. 69 (6): 765–766. doi:10.1525/aa.1967.69.6.02a00400. JSTOR 669708.
- Bateson, G. (1968). "Conscious Purpose Versus Nature". In Cooper, David (ed.). The Dialectics of Liberation. Pelican Books. pp. 34–49.
- Bateson, G. (1968). "On Dreams and Animal Behavior (…a fragment of a metalogue by G. Bateson which will be published in Thomas A. Sebeok and Alexandra Ramsay (Eds) Approaches to Animal Communication, The Hague, Mouton and Co". Family Process. 7 (2): 292–298.
- Bateson, G. (1968). "Redundancy and Coding". In Sebeok, Thomas A. (ed.). Animal Communication: Techniques of Study and Results of Research. Wenner-Gren Conference on Animal Communication. Indiana University Press. pp. 614–626.
- Bateson, G. (1968). "Review of Primate Ethology. Desmond Morris, ed". American Anthropologist. New Series. 70 (5): 1034–1035. doi:10.1525/aa.1968.70.5.02a00830. JSTOR 669832.
- Bateson, G. (1969). "Comment on "The Study of Language and Communication Across Species" by Harvey B. Sarles". Current Anthropology. 10 (2/3): 215. JSTOR 2740478.
- Bateson, G. (1969). "Metalogue: What is an Instinct?". In Sebeok, T.A.; Ramsay, A. (eds.). Approaches to Animal Communication. Mouton & Co. pp. 11–30.
- Bateson, G. (1970). "An Open Letter to Anatol Rapoport". ETC: A Review of General Semantics. 27 (3): 359–363. JSTOR 42575737.
- Bateson, G. (1970). "Form, Substance, and Difference". General Semantics Bulletin. 37: 5–13.
- Bateson, G. (15 July 1970). "On Empty-Headedness among Biologists and State Boards of Education". BioScience. 20 (14): 819. doi:10.2307/1295099. ISSN 0006-3568. JSTOR 1295099.
- Bateson, G. (31 January 1970). "The Message of Reinforcement". In Akin, Johnnye; Goldberg, Alvin; Myers, Gail; Stewart, Joseph (eds.). Language Behavior: A Book of Readings in Communication. Berlin, Boston: De Gruyter. pp. 62–72. ISBN 978-3-11-087875-2.
- Bateson, G. (1971). "A Re-Examination of "Bateson's Rule"". Journal of Genetics. 60 (3): 230–240. doi:10.1007/BF02984165. ISSN 0022-1333. S2CID 20214238.
- Bateson, G. (1971). "A systems approach". International Journal of Psychiatry. 9: 242–244. PMID 5482974.
- Bateson, G. (1971). "Excerpts of letters to Arthur Koestler dated April 6 and July 2, 1970". In Koestler, Arthur (ed.). The Case of the Midwife Toad. Hutchinson. pp. 24, 51, 82, 121.
- Authors "Chapter 1: Communication" and "Chapter 5: The Actors and the Setting" in "The Natural History of an Interview" (1971-06-30) [Microfilm]. Microfilm Collection of Manuscripts on Cultural Anthropology, Series: Series 15, No. 95. Chicago, IL: University of Chicago Library.
- With Ray Birdwhistell, H.W. Brosin & N.A. McQuown, authors the chapter "Remarks on the by-products of The Natural History of an Interview research project" in "The Natural History of an Interview" (1971-06-30) [Microfilm]. Microfilm Collection of Manuscripts on Cultural Anthropology, Series: Series 15, No. 95, pp. 4-5. Chicago, IL: University of Chicago Library.
- Bateson, G. (1971). "Restructuring the Ecology of a Great City". Radical Software. 1 (3): 2–3.
- Bateson, G. (1971). "The Cybernetics of "Self": A Theory of Alcoholism". Psychiatry. 34 (1): 1–18. doi:10.1080/00332747.1971.11023653. PMID 5100189.
- Bateson, G. (1972). "Comments". Our Own Metaphor: A Personal Account of a Conference on the Effects of Conscious Purpose on Human Adaptation. By Bateson, Mary Catherine. Alfred A. Knopf. ISBN 9780394474878.
- Bateson, G. (1972). "Double Bind, 1969". Steps to an Ecology of Mind: Collected Essays in Anthropology, Psychiatry, Evolution, and Epistemology. Chandler Publishing Company.
- Bateson, G. (1972). "Effects of Conscious Purpose on Human Adaptation". Steps to an Ecology of Mind: Collected Essays in Anthropology, Psychiatry, Evolution, and Epistemology. Chandler Publishing Company.
- Bateson, G. (1972). "From Versailles to Cybernetics". Steps to an Ecology of Mind: Collected Essays in Anthropology, Psychiatry, Evolution, and Epistemology. Chandler Publishing Company.
- Bateson, G. (1972). "Metalogue: Why Do Things Get in a Muddle?". Steps to an Ecology of Mind: Collected Essays in Anthropology, Psychiatry, Evolution, and Epistemology. Chandler Publishing Company.
- Bateson, G. (1972). "Pathologies of Epistemology". Steps to an Ecology of Mind: Collected Essays in Anthropology, Psychiatry, Evolution, and Epistemology. Chandler Publishing Company.
- Bateson, G. (1972). "Style, Grace and Information in Primitive Art". Steps to an Ecology of Mind: Collected Essays in Anthropology, Psychiatry, Evolution, and Epistemology. Chandler Publishing Company.
- Bateson, G. (1972). "The Logical Categories of Learning and Communication". Steps to an Ecology of Mind: Collected Essays in Anthropology, Psychiatry, Evolution, and Epistemology. Chandler Publishing Company.
- Bateson, G. (1972). "The Roots of the Ecological Crisis". Steps to an Ecology of Mind: Collected Essays in Anthropology, Psychiatry, Evolution, and Epistemology. Chandler Publishing Company.
- Bateson, G. (1972). "The Science of Mind and Order". Steps to an Ecology of Mind: Collected Essays in Anthropology, Psychiatry, Evolution, and Epistemology. Chandler Publishing Company.
- Bateson, G. (1973). "Mind/Environment". Social Change (1). Vic Gioscia (ed.): 6–21.
- Bateson, G.; von Foerster, Heinz (1974). Conditioning, Adaptation, Learning Model, and Double Bind. Cybernetics of Cybernetics: Or the Control of Control and the Communication of Communication. Urbana, IL: Biological Computer Laboratory, University of Illinois. pp. 97–98, 98–101, 299, 419–420.
- Bateson, G. (1974). "Distortions Under Culture Contact". In Lebra, W.P. (ed.). Youth, Socialization, and Mental Health. Mental Health Research in Asia and the Pacific, Vol 3. University of Hawaii Press. pp. 197–199.
- Bateson, G. (1974). "Observations of a Cetacean Community". In McIntyre, J. (ed.). Mind in the Waters: A Book to Celebrate the Consciousness of Whales and Dolphins. Charles Scribner's Sons. pp. 146–165.
- Bateson, G. (1974). "DRAFT: Scattered Thoughts for a Conference on "Broken Power"". The CoEvolution Quarterly. Vol. 4. pp. 26–27.
- Bateson, G. (4 February 1974). "The Non-Trivial". The Last Klein. University of California, Santa Cruz. pp. 1–2.
- Bateson, G. (1974). "Energy Does Not Explain". The CoEvolution Quarterly. No. 1. p. 45.
- Bateson, G. (1974). "Gratitude for Death". BioScience. 24 (1): 8. doi:10.2307/1296651. ISSN 0006-3568. JSTOR 1296651.
- Bateson, G. (1974). "Reading Suggested by G. Bateson". The CoEvolution Quarterly. No. 4. p. 28.
- Bateson, G. (1974). "Review of Acting: The First Six Lessons, by Richard Boleslavsky". The CoEvolution Quarterly. No. 4. p. 120.
- Bateson, G. (1974). "Review of Advanced Techniques of Hypnosis and Therapy: Selected Papers of Milton H. Erickson, M.D., edited by Jay Haley". In Brand, S. (ed.). Whole Earth Epilog. Penguin Books. p. 741.
- Bateson, G. (1974). "Review of Septem Sermones ad Mortuos, by C.G. Jung". Harper's. Vol. 248, no. 1487. p. 105.
- Bateson, G. (1974). "Review of Tracks by E.A.R. Ennion and N. Tinbergen". The CoEvolution Quarterly. No. 4. p. 123.
- Bateson, G. (1974). "The Creature and Its Creations". The CoEvolution Quarterly. No. 4. pp. 24–25.
- Bateson, G. (1975). "Coding and Redundancy". The CoEvolution Quarterly. No. 6. pp. 133–135.
- Bateson, G. (1975). "Quotation regarding "Sagan's Conjecture"". The CoEvolution Quarterly. No. 6. p. 7.
- Bateson, G. (1975). "Quotation regarding statisticians". The CoEvolution Quarterly. No. 6. p. 151.
- Bateson, G. (1975). "Quotation regarding wrapping up water in a Christmas package". The CoEvolution Quarterly. No. 6. p. 22.
- Bateson, G. (1975). "Comments". In Gilbert, R. (ed.). Edited Transcript AHP Theory Conference. San Francisco: Association for Humanistic Psychology. pp. 12–13, 14, 15, 16, 18–19, 43–44, 53–54.
- Bateson, G. (1975). "Ecology of Mind: The Sacred". In Fields, R. (ed.). Loka: A Journal from Naropa Institute. Anchor Books. pp. 24–27.
- Bateson, G. (1975). "Introduction". In Bandler, R.; Grinder, J. (eds.). The Structure of Magic: A Book About Language and Therapy. Science and Behavior Books. pp. ix–xi. ISBN 9780831400491.
- Bateson, G. (1975). "Letter in "Counsel for a Suicide's Friend"". The CoEvolution Quarterly. No. 5. p. 137.
- Bateson, G. (1975). "Orders of Change". In Fields, R. (ed.). Loka 2: A Journal From Naropa Institute. Anchor Books. pp. 59–63.
- Bateson, G. (1975). ""Reality" and Redundancy". The CoEvolution Quarterly. No. 6. pp. 132–135.
- Bateson, G. (1975). "Some Components of Socialization for Trance". Ethos. 3 (2): 143–155. doi:10.1525/eth.1975.3.2.02a00050. JSTOR 640225.
- Bateson, G. (1975). "Quotation regarding a church he would start". The CoEvolution Quarterly. No. 7. p. 51.
- Bateson, G. (1975). "What Energy Isn't". The CoEvolution Quarterly. No. 5. p. 29.
- Bateson, G. (1976). "Comments on Haley's "History": A Comment by Gregory Bateson". In Sluzki, C.E.; Ransom, D.C. (eds.). Double Bind: The Foundation of the Communicational Approach to the Family. Grune & Stratton. pp. 105–106.
- Bateson, G. (1976). "Foreword: A Formal Approach to Explicit, Implicit and Embodied Ideas and to Their Forms of Interaction". In Sluzki, C.E.; Ransom, D.C. (eds.). Double Bind: The Foundation of the Communicational Approach to the Family. Grune & Stratton. pp. xi–xvi.
- Bateson, G. (1976). "Quotation regarding Isak Dinesen on co-evolution". The CoEvolution Quarterly. No. 9. p. 90.
- Bateson, G. (1976). "Invitational Paper by Gregory Bateson". The CoEvolution Quarterly. No. 11. pp. 56–57.
- Bateson, G. (1976). "Answers to watershed quiz". The CoEvolution Quarterly. No. 12. p. 12.
- Bateson, G. (1976). "The Case Against the Case for Mind/Body Dualism". The CoEvolution Quarterly. No. 12. pp. 94–95.
- Bateson, G. (1976). "The Oak Beams of New College, Oxford". The CoEvolution Quarterly. No. 10. p. 66.
- Bateson, G. (1977). "Afterword". In Brockman, J. (ed.). About Bateson: Essays on G. Bateson. E.P. Dutton. pp. 235–247. ISBN 9780525474692.
- Bateson, G. (1977). "Epilogue: The Growth of Paradigms for Psychiatry". In Ostwald, P.F. (ed.). Communication and Social Interaction: Clinical and Therapeutic Aspects of Human Behavior. Grune & Stratton. pp. 331–337.
- Bateson, G. (1977). "Play and Paradigm". The Association for the Anthropological Study of Play Newsletter. 4 (1): 2–8.
- Bateson, G. (1977). "Quotation from Bateson's first meeting with the University of California Board of Regents". The CoEvolution Quarterly. No. 13. p. 143.
- Bateson, G. (1977). "Tank log, 28 October 1973". The Deep Self: Profound Relaxation and the Tank Isolation Technique. By Lilly, John C. Simon and Schuster. p. 185.
- Bateson, G. (1977). "The Thing of It Is". In Katz, M.; Marsh, W.P.; Thompson, G.G. (eds.). Earth's Answer: Explorations of Planetary Culture at the Lindisfarne Conferences. Lindisfarne Books/Harper and Row. pp. 143–154.
- Bateson, G. (1978). "Bateson's Workshop". In Berger, M.M. (ed.). Beyond the Double Bind: Communication and Family Systems, Theories, and Techniques with Schizophrenics. Brunner/Mazel. pp. 197–229. ISBN 9780876301845.
- Bateson, G. (1978). "Intelligence, Experience and Evolution". ReVision. 1 (2): 50–55.
- Bateson, G. (1978). "Nuclear Addiction: Bateson to Ellerbroek". The CoEvolution Quarterly. No. 18. pp. 16–17.
- Bateson, G. (1978). "Nuclear Addiction: Bateson to Saxon". The CoEvolution Quarterly. No. 18. p. 16.
- Bateson, G. (1978). "Number is Different from Quantity". The CoEvolution Quarterly. No. 17. pp. 44–46.
- Bateson, G. (1978). "Protect the trophies, slay the children". The CoEvolution Quarterly. No. 17. p. 46.
- Bateson, G. (1978). "Quotation regarding bosses". The CoEvolution Quarterly. No. 17. p. 90.
- Bateson, G. (1978). "Symptoms, Syndromes and Systems". The Esalen Catalog. Vol. 16, no. 4. pp. 4–6.
- Bateson, G. (1978). "The Birth of a Matrix or Double Bind and Epistemology". In Berger, M.M. (ed.). Beyond the Double Bind: Communication and Family Systems, Theories, and Techniques with Schizophrenics. Brunner/Mazel. pp. 39–64. ISBN 9780876301845.
- Bateson, G. (21 April 1978). "The Double-Bind Theory: Misunderstood?". Psychiatric News. No. 13. pp. 40–41.
- Bateson, G. (1978). "The Pattern Which Connects". The CoEvolution Quarterly. No. 18. pp. 4–15.
- Bateson, G. (1978). "Towards a Theory of Cultural Coherence: Comment". Anthropological Quarterly. 51 (1): 77–78. doi:10.2307/3317127. ISSN 0003-5491. JSTOR 3317127.
- Bateson, G. (1979). "Letter in "G. Bateson on Play and Work" by Phillips Stevens, Jr". The Association for the Anthropological Study of Play Newsletter. 5 (4): 2–4.
- Bateson, G. (1979). "Letter to the Regents of the University of California". The CoEvolution Quarterly. No. 24. pp. 22–23.
- Bateson, G. (1979). "Nuclear Armament as Epistemological Error: Letters to the California Board of Regents". Zero. No. 3. pp. 34–41.
- Bateson, G. (1979). "Response to inquiry regarding magazines". The CoEvolution Quarterly. No. 21. p. 75.
- Bateson, G. (1979). "The Magic of G. Bateson". Psychology Today. Vol. 13, no. 6. p. 128.
- Bateson, G. (1979). "The Science of Knowing". The Esalen Catalog. Vol. 17, no. 2. pp. 6–7.
- Bateson, G. (1980). "An Analysis of the Nazi Film "Hitlerjunge Quex"". Studies in Visual Communication. 6 (3): 20–55. doi:10.1111/j.2326-8492.1980.tb00121.x (inactive 12 August 2025). ISSN 0276-6558.
- Bateson, G. (1980). "Comments". In Piattelli-Palmarini, M. (ed.). Language and Learning: The Debate Between Jean Piaget and Noam Chomsky. Harvard University Press. pp. 76–77, 78, 222, 262, 263–264, 266, 269.
- Bateson, G. (1980). "Health: Whose Responsibility?". Energy Medicine. Vol. 1, no. 1. pp. 70–75.
- Bateson, G. (1980). "In July, 1979…". The Esalen Catalog. Vol. 19, no. 3. pp. 6–7.
- Bateson, G. (1980). "Men are Grass: Metaphor and the World of Mental Process". Lindisfarne Letter. No. 11.
- Bateson, G. (1980). "Seek the Sacred: Dartington Seminar". Resurgence. Vol. 10, no. 6. pp. 18–20.
- Bateson, G. (24 January 1980). "Syllogisms in Grass". London Review of Books. Vol. 2, no. 1. p. 2.
- Bateson, G. (1980). "The Oak Beams of New College, Oxford". In Brand, S. (ed.). The Next Whole Earth Catalog. Random House. p. 77.
- Bateson, G. (1981). "Allegory". The Esalen Catalog. Vol. 20, no. 1. p. 13.
- Bateson, G. (1981). "Letter in "Editor's Note: Sociobiology: A Paradigm's Unnatural Selection Through Science, Philosophy, and Ideology" by Anthony Leeds and Valentine Dusek". The Philosophical Forum: A Quarterly. Vol. 13, no. 2–3. pp. xxix–xxx.
- Bateson, G. (1981). "Paradigmatic Conservatism". In Wilder-Mott, C.; Weakland, J.H. (eds.). Rigor & Imagination: Essays from the Legacy of G. Bateson. Praeger Publishers. pp. 347–355.
- Bateson, G.; Caldecott, O. (1981). "Short excerpt from a letter to Oliver Caldecott". Life and Habitat. By Butler, Samuel. Wildwood House Ltd.
- Bateson, G. (1981). "The Eternal Verities". The Yale Review. Vol. 71, no. 1. pp. 1–12.
- Bateson, G. (1981). "The Manuscript". The Esalen Catalog. Vol. 20, no. 1. p. 12.
- Bateson, G. (1982). "Difference, Double Description and the Interactive Designation of Self". In Hanson, A.F. (ed.). Studies in Symbolism and Cultural Communication. University of Kansas Pubklications in Anthropology No. 14. University of Kansas. pp. 3–8.
- Bateson, G. (1982). Foreword. St. George and the Dandelion: 40 Years of Practice as a Jungian Analyst. By Wheelwright, Joseph B. The C.G. Jung Institute of San Francisco, Inc. pp. xi–xiii.
- Bateson, G. (1982). "They Threw God Out of the Garden: Letters from G. Bateson to Philip Wylie and Warren McCulloch". The CoEvolution Quarterly. No. 36. pp. 62–67.
- Bateson, G. (1985). "Excerpt from a letter to William Coleman dated December 1, 1966". Alfred North Whitehead: The Man and His Work, Volume I: 1861-1910. By Lowe, Victor. The Johns Hopkins University Press. pp. 206–207.
- Bateson, G. (1986). "The Prairie Seen Whole". Prairie: Images of Ground and Sky. By Evans, Terry. University of Kansas Press. ISBN 9780700602872.
- Bateson, G. (1991). "From Anthropology to Epistemology". In Donaldson, R.E. (ed.). A Sacred Unity: Further Steps to an Ecology of Mind. A Cornelia & Michael Bessie Book. pp. 89–90. ISBN 9780062501004.
- Bateson, G. (1991). ""Last Lecture"". In Donaldson, R.E. (ed.). A Sacred Unity: Further Steps to an Ecology of Mind. A Cornelia & Michael Bessie Book. pp. 307–313. ISBN 9780062501004.
- Bateson, G. (1991). "Our Own Metaphor: Nine Years After". In Donaldson, R.E. (ed.). A Sacred Unity: Further Steps to an Ecology of Mind. A Cornelia & Michael Bessie Book. pp. 225–229. ISBN 9780062501004.
- Bateson, G. (1991). "The Moral and Aesthetic Structure of Human Adaptation". In Donaldson, R.E. (ed.). A Sacred Unity: Further Steps to an Ecology of Mind. A Cornelia & Michael Bessie Book. pp. 253–257. ISBN 9780062501004.
- Bateson, G. (1997). "Epistemology of Organization: Inaugural Eric Berne Lecture in Social Psychotherapy, Southeast Institute, March 1977". Transactional Analysis Journal. 27 (2): 138–145. doi:10.1177/036215379702700210. ISSN 0362-1537.
- Bateson, G. (14 August 2007). "Adaptation, acclimation, addiction, remedy, etc". Kybernetes. 36 (7/8). M.S. Broecker, Georg Ivanovas (eds.): 855–858. doi:10.1108/03684920710777379. ISSN 0368-492X.
- Bateson, G. (14 August 2007). "Reflections on learning and addiction: porpoises and palm trees". Kybernetes. 36 (7/8). M.S. Broecker, Georg Ivanovas (eds.): 985–999. doi:10.1108/03684920710777504. ISSN 0368-492X.
- Bateson, G. (2015). "Form, Substance and Difference". ETC: A Review of General Semantics. 72 (1): 90–104. JSTOR 24761998.
- Bateson, G. (2016). "Letter: Gregory Bateson to Cecil P. Martin". Cybernetics and Human Knowing. 23 (3): 91–92.
- Bateson, G. (2017). "Metalogue: Is There a Conspiracy?". Transdyscyplinarne Studia o Kulturze (I) Edukacji: 24–33.
- Bateson, G. (2017). "Some 19th Century Problems of Evolution (1965)". Cybernetics and Human Knowing. 24 (1): 55–79.
- Bateson, G.; Brown, Edmund G. (1976). "Prayer Breakfast". The CoEvolution Quarterly. No. 9. pp. 82–84.
- Bateson, G.; Hall, Robert A. (1944). "A Melanesian Culture-Contact Myth in Pidgin English". The Journal of American Folklore. 57 (226): 255–262. doi:10.2307/535357. ISSN 0021-8715. JSTOR 535357.
- Bateson, G.; Jackson, Don D. (1964). "Social Factors and Disorders of Communication. Some Varieties of Pathogenic Organization". In Rioch, D.M.; Weinstein, E.A. (eds.). Research publications - Association for Research in Nervous and Mental Disease. Vol. 42. Williams & Wilkins. pp. 270–290. PMID 14265454.
- Bateson, G.; Jackson, Don D.; Haley, Jay; Weakland, John (1956). "Toward a Theory of Schizophrenia". Behavioral Science. 1 (4): 251–264. doi:10.1002/bs.3830010402.
- Bateson, G.; Jackson, Don D.; Haley, Jay; Weakland, John H. (1963). "A Note on the Double Bind—1962". Family Process. 2 (1): 154–161. doi:10.1111/j.1545-5300.1963.00154.x. ISSN 0014-7370.
- Bateson, G.; Mead, Margaret (1941). "Principles of Morale Building". Journal of Educational Sociology. 15 (4): 206–220. doi:10.2307/2262467. ISSN 0885-3525. JSTOR 2262467.
- Bateson, G.; Rieber, Robert W. (1980). "Mind and Body: A Dialogue". In Rieber, R.W. (ed.). Body and Mind: Past, Present, and Future. New York: Academic Press. pp. 241–252. ISBN 978-0-12-588260-6.
- Bateson, G.; Rogers, Carl (1989). "Dialogue Between G. Bateson and Carl Rogers". In Kirschenbaum, H.; Henderson, V.L. (eds.). Carl Rogers: Dialogues : Conversations with Martin Buber, Paul Tillich, B.F. Skinner, G. Bateson, Michael Polanyi, Rollo May, and Others. Houghton, Mifflin and Company.
- Bateson, G.; Ruderman, Sheldon (1971). "Comment on "An Open Letter to G. Bateson" by Sheldon Ruderman". ETC: A Review of General Semantics. 28 (2): 239–240. JSTOR 42576097.
- Bateson, G.; Ryan, Paul (1980). "A Metalogue". All Area. No. 1. pp. 46–67.
- Bateson, William; Bateson, G. (1925). "On certain aberrations of the red-legged partridges Alectoris rufa and Saxatilis". Journal of Genetics. 16 (16): 101–123. doi:10.1007/BF02983990. S2CID 28076556.
- Beels, C. Christian (1979). "Profile: G. Bateson". The Kinesis Report: News and View of Nonverbal Communication. 2 (2): 1–3, 15–16.
- Brand, Stewart (1973). "Both Sides of the Necessary Paradox". Harper's. Vol. 247, no. 1482. pp. 20–37.
- Brand, Stewart (1975). "Caring and Clarity: Conversation with G. Bateson and Edmund G. Brown, Jr., Governor of California". The CoEvolution Quarterly. No. 7. pp. 32–47.
- Brand, Stewart (1976). "For God's Sake, Margaret: A Conversation with G. Bateson and Margaret Mead". The CoEvolution Quarterly. No. 10. pp. 32–44.
- Brand, Stewart (1977). "Margaret Mead and G. Bateson on the Use of the Camera in Anthropology". Studies in the Anthropology of Visual Communication. 4 (2): 78–80. doi:10.1525/var.1977.4.2.78 (inactive 12 August 2025). Archived from the original on 20 July 2018.
- Deren, Maya; Bateson, G. (1980). "Letter in "An Exchange of Letters between Maya Deren and G. Bateson"". October. 14: 18–20. doi:10.2307/778528. ISSN 0162-2870. JSTOR 778528.
- Fields, Rick; Greene, Richard (1975). "A Conversation with G. Bateson". Loka: A Journal from Naropa Institute. Anchor Books. pp. 28–34.
- Goleman, Daniel (1978). "Breaking Out of the Double Bind". Psychology Today. Vol. 12, no. 8. pp. 42–51.
- Holt, Claire; Bateson, G. (1944). "Form and Function of the Dance in Bali". The Function of Dance in Human Society: A Seminar Directed by Franziska Boas. New York: The Boas School. pp. 46–52, Plates 11–19.
- Keeney, Bradford P. (1981). "G. Bateson: A Final Metaphor". Family Process. 20 (1): 1. doi:10.1111/j.1545-5300.1981.00001.x. ISSN 0014-7370.
- Ruesch, Jurgen; Bateson, G. (1949). "Structure and Process in Social Relations". Psychiatry. 12 (2): 105–124. doi:10.1080/00332747.1949.11022724. PMID 18152792.
- Ruesch, Jurgen; Bateson, G. (1951). "Communication and the System of Checks and Balances: An Anthropological Approach". Communication: The Social Matrix of Psychiatry. W.W. Norton. pp. 150–167.
- Ruesch, Jurgen; Bateson, G. (1951). "Individual, Group, and Culture: A Review of the Theory of Human Communication". Communication: The Social Matrix of Psychiatry. W.W. Norton. pp. 273–289.
- Thayer, Lee (1973). "A Conversation with G. Bateson". In Thayer, Lee (ed.). Communication: Ethical and Moral Issues. Gordon and Breach. pp. 247–248.
- Weakland, John (1981). "One Thing Leads to Another". In Wilder-Mott, Carol; Weakland, John H. (eds.). Rigor & Imagination: Essays from the Legacy of G. Bateson. pp. 56–63.
- Welwood, John (1978). "A Conversation with Gregory Bateson". ReVision. 1 (2): 43–49.

Documentary film

- Mead, M. & Bateson, G. (Producers). (1951). A Balinese Family (Film)., 2 reels.
- Mead, M. & Bateson, G. (Producers). (1952). First Days in the Life of a New Guinea Baby (Film)., 2 reels.
- Mead, M. & Bateson, G. (Producers). (1952). Karba's First Years (Film)., 2 reels.
- Mead, M. & Bateson, G. (Directors). (1952). Trance and Dance in Bali (Film)., 2 reels. The film was an inductee of the 1999 National Film Registry list.
- Mead, M. & Bateson, G. (Producers). (1954). Childhood Rivalry in Bali and New Guinea (Film)., 2 reels.
- Mead, M. & Bateson, G. (Producers). (1954). Bathing Babies in Three Cultures (Film)., 1 reel.
- Mead, M. & Bateson, G. (Producers). (1978). Learning to Dance in Bali (Film)., 1 reel.

== See also ==
- Ray Birdwhistell
- Coherence therapy § Hierarchical organization of constructs
- Complex systems
- Constructivist epistemology
- Family therapy
- Holism
- Ignacio Matte Blanco
- Macy Conferences
- Mary Catherine Bateson
- Mind-body problem
- Niklas Luhmann
- Second-order cybernetics
- Systems philosophy
- Systems theory in anthropology
- Systems thinking
