= Double bind =

Psychological dilemma

A double bind is a dilemma in communication in which an individual (or group) receives two or more mutually conflicting messages. In some scenarios (such as within families or romantic relationships), this can be emotionally distressing, creating a situation in which a successful response to one message results in a failed response to the other (and vice versa), such that the person responding will automatically be perceived as in the wrong, no matter how they respond.

Double bind theory was first stated by Gregory Bateson and his colleagues in the 1950s, in a theory on the origins of schizophrenia. It was theorized that schizophrenic responses were a reaction to an individual facing competing demands, leaving them with no clear way of responding.

Double binds are often utilized as a form of control without open coercion—the use of confusion makes them difficult both to respond to and to resist. In many of these choice situations or dilemmas, it's not possible to carry out both instructions given at once.

A double bind generally includes different levels of abstraction in the order of messages and these messages can either be stated explicitly or implicitly within the context of the situation, or they can be conveyed by tone of voice or body language. Further complications arise when frequent double binds are part of an ongoing relationship to which the person or group is committed.

More recent theoretical scholarship and empirical research have suggested that double bind communication may be a feature of personality disorder, specifically borderline personality disorder.

== Explanation ==
The double bind is often misunderstood to be a simple contradictory situation, where the subject is trapped by two conflicting demands. While it is true that the core of the double bind is two conflicting demands, the difference lies in how they are imposed upon the subject, what the subject's understanding of the situation is, and who (or what) imposes these demands upon the subject. Unlike the usual no-win situation, the subject has difficulty in defining the exact nature of the paradoxical situation in which they are caught. The contradiction may be unexpressed in its immediate context and therefore invisible to external observers, only becoming evident when a prior communication is considered. Typically, a demand is imposed upon the subject by someone whom they respect (such as a parent, teacher, or doctor) but the demand itself is inherently impossible to fulfill because some broader context forbids it. For example, this situation arises when a person in a position of authority imposes two contradictory conditions but there exists an unspoken rule that one must never question authority.

Gregory Bateson and his colleagues defined the double bind as follows (paraphrased):

1. The situation involves two or more people, one of whom (for the purpose of the definition), is designated as the "subject". The others are people who are considered the subject's superiors: figures of authority (such as parents), whom the subject respects.
2. Repeated experience: the double bind is a recurrent theme in the experience of the subject, and as such, cannot be resolved as a single traumatic experience.
3. A 'primary injunction' is imposed on the subject by the others generally in one of two forms:
  - (a) "Do X, or I will punish you";
  - (b) "Do not do X, or I will punish you."
  The punishment may include the withdrawing of love, the expression of hate and anger, or abandonment resulting from the authority figure's expression of helplessness.
4. A 'secondary injunction' is imposed on the subject, conflicting with the first at a higher and more abstract level. For example: "You must do X, but only do it because you want to." It is unnecessary for this injunction to be expressed verbally.
5. If necessary, a 'tertiary injunction' is imposed on the subject to prevent them from escaping the dilemma.
6. Finally, Bateson states that the complete list of the previous requirements may be unnecessary, in the event that the subject is already viewing their world in double bind patterns. Bateson goes on to give the general characteristics of such a relationship:
  1. When the subject is involved in an intense relationship; that is, a relationship in which he feels it is vitally important that he discriminate accurately what sort of message is being communicated so that he may respond appropriately;
  2. And, the subject is caught in a situation in which the other person in the relationship is expressing two orders of message and one of these denies the other;
  3. And, the subject is unable to comment on the messages being expressed to correct his discrimination of what order of message to respond to: i.e., he cannot make a metacommunicative statement.

Thus, the essence of a double bind is two conflicting demands, each on a different logical level, neither of which can be ignored or escaped. This leaves the subject torn both ways, so that whichever demand they try to meet, the other demand cannot be met. "I must do it, but I can't do it" is a typical description of the double-bind experience.

For a double bind to be effective, the subject must be unable to confront or resolve the conflict between the demand placed by the primary injunction and that of the secondary injunction. In this sense, the double bind differentiates itself from a simple contradiction to a more inexpressible internal conflict, where the subject really wants to meet the demands of the primary injunction, but fails each time through an inability to address the situation's incompatibility with the demands of the secondary injunction. Thus, subjects may express feelings of extreme anxiety in such a situation, as they attempt to fulfill the demands of the primary injunction albeit with obvious contradictions in their actions.

This was a problem in United States legal circles prior to the Fifth Amendment to the United States Constitution being applied to state action. A person could be subpoenaed to testify in a federal case and given Fifth Amendment immunity for testimony in that case. However, since the immunity did not apply to a state prosecution, the person could refuse to testify at the Federal level despite being given immunity, thus subjecting the person to imprisonment for contempt of court, or the person could testify, and the information they were forced to give in the Federal proceeding could then be used to convict the person in a state proceeding.

Sukaina Hirji (utilizing the interpretation of Marilyn Frye) defines the "oppressive double bind" as follows (paraphrased):

1. A double bind is a choice situation with few options that all lead to a form of punishment or deprivation. The resulting situation is the option to maintain invisibility through compliance of structural oppression or to challenge societal norms, leaving the individual with blame due to their identity.
2. Frye emphasizes that the context of social barriers as a form of reinforcing to the immobilization and success of certain members of society is a key element to understanding and interpreting the double bind. These societal barriers often favor specific groups, leaving those not associated ostracized from societal success.
  1. Societal barriers in society manifest in the form of stereotypes regarding race, class, gender, sexuality, etc.
3. A key element - both options in the situation leave the individual in a stale position. The individual often has a moral choice and prudential choice, either one robbing them of some sort of pride or benefit.
4. Even if the individual resists the oppressive norm, they will most likely face punishment. Their individual success or survival in a society that enforces this oppressive system is a form resistance but their experience being punished degrades their progress towards the goal of dismantling the oppressive system.

=== Example ===
The classic example given of a negative double bind is of a parent telling their child they love them, while at the same time turning away in disgust, or inflicting corporal punishment as discipline: the words are socially acceptable; the body language is in conflict with it. The child does not know how to respond to the conflict between the words and the body language and, because the child is dependent on the parent for basic needs, they are in a quandary. Small children have difficulty articulating contradictions verbally and can neither ignore them nor leave the relationship.

== Development of the hypothesis ==
The term double bind was coined by the anthropologist Gregory Bateson and his colleagues (including Don D. Jackson, Jay Haley and John H. Weakland) in the mid-1950s, in their discussions on complexity of communication in relation to schizophrenia. Bateson made clear that such complexities are common in normal circumstances, especially in "play, humour, poetry, ritual and fiction" (see Logical Types below). Their findings indicated that the tangles in communication often diagnosed as schizophrenia are not necessarily the result of an organic brain dysfunction. Instead, they found that destructive double binds were a frequent pattern of communication among families of patients, and they proposed that growing up amidst perpetual double binds could lead to learned patterns of confusion in thinking and communication.

While working in the United States' Veteran's Administration Hospital with World War II veterans from 1949 to 1962, Bateson and his colleagues hypothesized that schizophrenic thinking was not necessarily an inborn mental disorder but a pattern of learned helplessness in response to cognitive double-binds externally imposed.

The veterans had been able to function well in combat, but life-threatening stress had affected them. At that time, 18 years before post-traumatic stress disorder was officially recognized, the veterans had been saddled with the catch-all diagnosis of schizophrenia. Bateson didn't challenge the diagnosis but he did maintain that the seeming nonsense the patients said at times did make sense within context, and he gives numerous examples in section III of Steps to an Ecology of Mind, "Pathology in Relationship". For example, a patient misses an appointment, and when Bateson finds him later the patient says "the judge disapproves"; Bateson responds, "You need a defense lawyer". See following (pp. 195–6). Bateson also surmised that people habitually caught in double binds in childhood would have greater problems—that in the case of the person with schizophrenia, the double bind is presented continually and habitually within the family context from infancy on. By the time the child is old enough to have identified the double bind situation, it has already been internalized, and the child is unable to confront it. The solution then is to create an escape from the conflicting logical demands of the double bind, in the world of the delusional system (see in Towards a Theory of Schizophrenia – Illustrations from Clinical Data).

One solution to a double bind is to place the problem in a larger context, a state Bateson identified as Learning III, a step up from Learning II (which requires only learned responses to reward/consequence situations). In Learning III, the double bind is contextualized and understood as an impossible no-win scenario so that ways around it can be found.

Double bind communication has since been proposed as a feature of borderline personality disorder. In a series of publications, Mark L. Ruffalo has argued that individuals with borderline personality disorder engage in double bind communication as an expression of the disorder's characteristic "need-fear dilemma," involving a simultaneous desire for and fear of interpersonal closeness. A 2025 empirical study by Ruffalo and psychologist John Rucker reported that patients with personality disorders used language in ways consistent with double bind communication. In 2026, Ruffalo and psychiatrist Jerold J. Kreisman elaborated this proposal into a formal double bind theory of borderline personality disorder, published in the Bulletin of the Menninger Clinic.

== The double bind as a driver of evolution ==
After many years of research into schizophrenia, Bateson continued to explore problems of communication and learning, first with dolphins, and then with the more abstract processes of evolution. Bateson emphasized that any communicative system characterized by different logical levels might be subject to double bind problems. Especially including the communication of characteristics from one generation to another (genetics and evolution).

Evolution always followed the pathways of viability. As Lewis Carroll has pointed out, the theory [of natural selection] explains quite satisfactorily why there are no bread-and-butter-flies today."

Bateson used the fictional Bread and Butter Fly (from Through the Looking Glass, and What Alice Found There) to illustrate the double bind in terms of natural selection. The gnat points out that the insect would be doomed if he found his food (which would dissolve his own head, since this insect's head is made of sugar, and his only food is tea), and starve if he did not. Alice suggests that this must happen quite often, to which the gnat replies: "It always happens."

The pressures that drive evolution therefore represent a genuine double bind. And there is truly no escape: "It always happens." No species can escape natural selection, including our own.

Bateson suggested that all evolution is driven by the double bind, whenever circumstances change: If any environment becomes toxic to any species, that species will die out unless it transforms into another species, in which case, the species becomes extinct anyway.

Most significant here is Bateson's exploration of what he later came to call "the pattern that connects"—that problems of communication which span more than one level (e.g., the relationship between the individual and the family) should also be expected to be found spanning other pairs of levels in the hierarchy (e.g. the relationship between the genotype and the phenotype):

We are very far … from being able to pose specific questions for the geneticist; but I believe that the wider implications of what I have been saying modify somewhat the philosophy of genetics. Our approach to the problems of schizophrenia by way of a theory of levels or logical types has disclosed first that the problems of adaptation and learning and their pathologies must be considered in terms of a hierarchic system in which stochastic change occurs at the boundary points between the segments of the hierarchy. We have considered three such regions of stochastic change—the level of genetic mutation, the level of learning, and the level of change in family organization. We have disclosed the possibility of a relationship of these levels which orthodox genetics would deny, and we have disclosed that at least in human societies the evolutionary system consists not merely in the selective survival of those persons who happen to select appropriate environments but also in the modification of family environment in a direction which might enhance the phenotypic and genotypic characteristics of the individual members.

=== Positive double binds ===
Bateson also described positive double binds, both in relation to Zen Buddhism with its path of spiritual growth, and the use of therapeutic double binds by psychiatrists to confront their patients with the contradictions in their life in such a way that would help them heal. One of Bateson's consultants, Milton H. Erickson (5 volumes, edited by Rossi) eloquently demonstrated the productive possibilities of double binds through his own life, showing the technique in a brighter light.

== Double binds in society ==
=== Gender stereotypes ===
Societal expectations of gender can create situations where people are viewed negatively regardless of the actions or decisions they make. For example, the belief that masculinity means decisiveness can cause men who are cautious to be seen as less manly. Double binds can be used by those with influence to use stereotypes to cause harm to less powerful groups. In the case of gender, this means using gender stereotypes to force, typically women and nonbinary people, into boxes related to stereotypes. This is done by creating a contradiction of roles and then asserting that no person can be more complicated than those two options. This creates a no-win situation where a person cannot overcome the stereotypical expectations and create a third category or role. The most common way this shows up is related to gender in women in roles of power.

When women are assertive in business positions, politics, or personal lives, they are seen as too assertive and unpleasant. However, if women revert to socially acceptable and proper ways of being, they are seen as weak and undeserving of their accomplishments. This creates a no-win situation. Women also exist in a social construct that places unspoken responsibilities on females that males don't have. They are expected to give care, attention, and validation to men which can influence their decisions and increase the pressure in double bind situations. Kate Manne suggests that dominant groups in society act as a sort of "law enforcement" patrolling those who aren't in the "in-group" - another gendered factor that influences choice situations. In a patriarchal society, women are associated with certain beauty ideals and expectations surrounding their role in the societal structure. Those who reject this construct risk not being accepted or being disregarded. However, since frameworks of female beauty standards for women in society create norms where women are forced into restrictive roles as, for example, sexual objects, compliance with these roles also involves alienation and disregard. This forms a very broad double bind often remarked on in feminist scholarship.

=== Racial stereotypes ===
Much like the intersection of gender and the double bind, stereotypes about race are used to create a double bind. Racial groups exert power over less privileged groups by invoking stereotypes to explain why those groups do not have access to the privileges the powerful groups have in excess. Race and gender also intersect to create a “triple bind” where stereotypes are used against women of color to cause more harm and barriers to access opportunities. The concept of the double bind as it relates to race is common in Race, Nation, and Culture studies and Political Science studies.

== Double binds in science ==
One of the causes of double binds is the loss of feedback systems. Gregory Bateson and Lawrence S. Bale describe double binds that have arisen in science that have caused decades-long delays of progress in science because the scientific community had defined something as outside of its scope (or as "not science") on the paradigm of classical science versus that of systems theory and cybernetics. (See the foreword to Steps to an Ecology of Mind for Bateson's account of the development of the double bind hypothesis.)

== Girard's mimetic double bind ==
René Girard, in his literary theory of mimetic desire, proposes what he calls a "model-obstacle", a role model who demonstrates an object of desire and yet, in possessing that object, becomes a rival who obstructs fulfillment of the desire. According to Girard, the "internal mediation" of this mimetic dynamic "operates along the same lines as what Gregory Bateson called the 'double bind'." Girard found in Sigmund Freud's psychoanalytic theory, a precursor to mimetic desire. "The individual who 'adjusts' has managed to relegate the two contradictory injunctions of the double bind—to imitate and not to imitate—to two different domains of application. This is, he divides reality in such a way as to neutralize the double bind." While critical of Freud's doctrine of the unconscious mind, Girard sees the ancient Greek tragedy, Oedipus Rex, and key elements of Freud's Oedipus complex, patricidal and incestuous desire, to serve as prototypes for his own analysis of the mimetic double bind.

Far from being restricted to a limited number of pathological cases, as American theoreticians suggest, the double bind—a contradictory double imperative, or rather a whole network of contradictory imperatives—is an extremely common phenomenon. In fact, it is so common that it might be said to form the basis of all human relationships.

Bateson is undoubtedly correct in believing that the effects of the double bind on the child are particularly devastating. All the grown-up voices around him, beginning with those of the father and mother (voices which, in our society at least, speak for the culture with the force of established authority) exclaim in a variety of accents, "Imitate us!" "Imitate me!" "I bear the secret of life, of true being!" The more attentive the child is to these seductive words, and the more earnestly he responds to the suggestions emanating from all sides, the more devastating will be the eventual conflicts. The child possesses no perspective that will allow him to see things as they are. He has no basis for reasoned judgements, no means of foreseeing the metamorphosis of his model into a rival. This model's opposition reverberates in his mind like a terrible condemnation; he can only regard it as an act of excommunication. The future orientation of his desires—that is, the choice of his future models—will be significantly affected by the dichotomies of his childhood. In fact, these models will determine the shape of his personality.

If desire is allowed its own bent, its mimetic nature will almost always lead it into a double bind. The unchanneled mimetic impulse hurls itself blindly against the obstacle of a conflicting desire. It invites its own rebuffs and these rebuffs will in turn strengthen the mimetic inclination. We have, then, a self-perpetuating process, constantly increasing in simplicity and fervor. Whenever the disciple borrows from his model what he believes to be the "true" object, he tries to possess that truth by desiring precisely what this model desires. Whenever he sees himself closest to the supreme goal, he comes into violent conflict with a rival. By a mental shortcut that is both eminently logical and self-defeating, he convinces himself that the violence itself is the most distinctive attribute of this supreme goal! Ever afterward, violence will invariably awaken desire...

— René Girard, Violence and the Sacred: "From Mimetic Desire to the Monstrous Double", pp.156–157

== See also ==
- Ambiguity
- Barber paradox
- Buridan's bridge
- Catch-22 (logic)
- Cognitive dissonance
- Dialectic
- Doublethink
- Evaporating Cloud
- Expressed emotion
- False dilemma
- Four sides model
- Loaded question
- Master suppression techniques
- Meta-communication
- Mutually exclusive events
- No-win situation
- Procrastination
- R. D. Laing
- Schismogenesis
- The Self and Others
- Self-reference
- Zeno's Paradoxes
- Zugzwang
