= Mary Catherine Bateson =

American anthropologist (1939–2021)

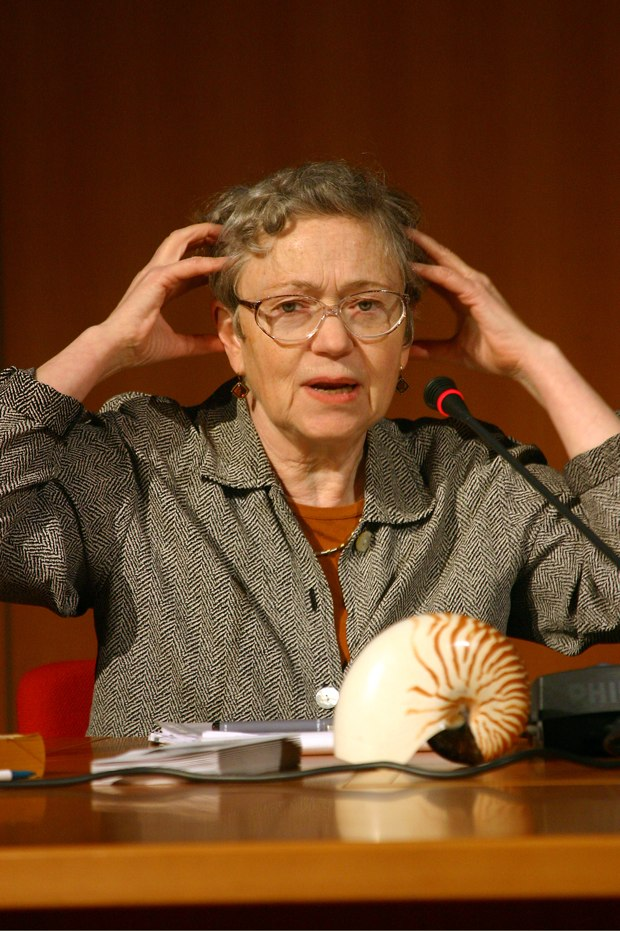
- Bateson in 2004
- Born: December 8, 1939; New York City, U.S.
- Died: January 2, 2021 (aged 81); New Hampshire, U.S.
- Education: Radcliffe College (BA); Harvard University (PhD)
- Occupation: Cultural anthropologist
- Spouse: J. Barkev Kassarjian (m. 1960)
- Children: 1
- Parents: Gregory Bateson; Margaret Mead
- Relatives: Jeremy Steig (cousin); William Steig (uncle); Leo Rosten (uncle); William Bateson (grandfather)

Mary Catherine Bateson (December 8, 1939 – January 2, 2021) was an American writer and cultural anthropologist.

The daughter of Margaret Mead and Gregory Bateson, Bateson was a noted author in her field with many published monographs. Among her books was With a Daughter's Eye: A Memoir of Margaret Mead and Gregory Bateson, a recounting of her upbringing by two famous parents. She taught at Harvard, Amherst, and George Mason University.

== Early life and education ==
Bateson was a graduate of the Brearley School and received her B.A. from Radcliffe in 1960 and her Ph.D. in linguistics and Middle Eastern Studies from Harvard in 1963. Her dissertation examined linguistic patterns in pre-Islamic Arabic poetry.

== Career ==
In the mid-1960s, Bateson became a visiting assistant professor of anthropology at the Ateneo de Manila University in the Philippines, studying Tagalog and helping organize a sociology seminar with businessman Sixto K. Roxas in 1968 to better address housing needs for the SSS Village then being built in the town of Marikina, Rizal.

Bateson considered herself an "activist for peace and justice" and stressed the importance in the years of “unanticipated longevity” of continuing to be willing to learn. Because of her work on aging and the changing role of women in modern society, Bateson has been referred to as one of the most important anthropologists of the past century. Lectures by Bateson have encouraged adults to become a lot more engaged in the world and not to retire.

At the beginning of her career, she was a linguist and studied Arabic poetry. Then, she shifted her focus from a professional interest in human patterns of communication to highly-formalistic studies, which started her career as an anthropologist. Changing focus in topics, Bateson began to use her own life experience to write.

Bateson was a fellow of the International Leadership Forum and was president of the Institute for Intercultural Studies in New York until 2010.

== Personal life and death ==
Bateson was married to Barkev Kassarjian, a professor of management at Babson College, from 1960 to her death. As graduate students, the young couple purchased, for a sum of $15,000, an 18th-century farmhouse on a wooded 100-acre New Hampshire property that served, in addition to a Cambridge, Massachusetts apartment, as their home for over 50 years. They had one daughter, Sevanne Margaret (born 1969), an actress who works professionally under the name Sevanne Martin, and two grandchildren.

Through her mother's side of the family, Bateson was also the cousin of Jeremy Steig as well as a niece of William Steig and Leo Rosten. Toward the end of Bateson's residence in Iran in 1979, Catherine's mother who was paying a visit to her family in Iran died in New York. Her father then died a year later in 1980.

Bateson died on January 2, 2021, at a hospice near her home in Hancock, New Hampshire, aged 81. She had suffered from brain damage from a fall a few months earlier.

== Works ==
=== Style ===
Bateson used her own experience as a woman, daughter, mother, scholar, and anthropologist, who went through many different situations, as a guide for her writings. Bateson liked to keep her readers engaged by having them question her ideology and entertain the readings own provoking thoughts with questions. She wrote in a similar style to journaling and often used personal examples or quotes for ideas and observations. She also used cross-cultural experiences of other individuals incorporated into her writings.

One of Bateson's first books was her memoir With a Daughter's Eye in which she reflected on her earlier life with her parents: Margaret Mead and Gregory Bateson. The memoir created a path for self-discovery and enablement of the experiences that she incorporated into her writings, such as her next book, Composing a Life. That book showed how deeply connected Bateson's own journey as a scholar as parallel was to a world in which she and other women faced overt sexism and female inferiority.

=== Publications ===
- Arabic Language Handbook (1967)
- Our Own Metaphor: A Personal Account of a Conference on the Effects of Conscious Purpose on Human Adaptation (1972)
- At Home in Iran (1974)
- With a Daughter's Eye: A Memoir of Margaret Mead and Gregory Bateson (1984)
- Angels Fear: Towards an Epistemology of the Sacred (1987) written with Gregory Bateson
- Thinking AIDS (1988) with Richard Goldsby
- Composing a Life (1991)
- Peripheral Visions - Learning Along the Way (1994)
- Full Circles, Overlapping Lives: Culture and Generation in Transition (2000)
- Willing to Learn: Passages of Personal Discovery (2004)
- Composing a Further Life: The Age of Active Wisdom (2010)
- Thinking Race: Social Myths and Biological Realities (2019) with Richard Goldsby
