= Schismogenesis =

Formation of social divisions

Schismogenesis is a term in anthropology that describes the formation of social divisions and differentiation. Literally meaning 'creation of division', the term derives from the Greek words σχίσμα (skhísma, 'cleft'; borrowed into English as schism), and γένεσις (génesis, 'generation, creation'). The term was introduced in the 1930s by anthropologist Gregory Bateson and has been applied to various fields. Bateson developed the concept in reference to social behavior between groups of the Iatmul people of New Guinea.

== Concepts ==
=== In anthropology ===
Gregory Bateson developed the concept of schismogenesis in the 1930s in reference to certain forms of social behavior between groups of the Iatmul people of the Sepik River in New Guinea. Bateson first used the term in a publication in 1935, but elaborated on the concept in his classic 1936 ethnography Naven: A Survey of the Problems suggested by a Composite Picture of the Culture of a New Guinea Tribe drawn from Three Points of View (reissued with a new epilogue in 1958). The word "naven" refers to an honorific ceremony among the Iatmul whereby certain categories of kin celebrate first-time cultural achievements. In a schematic summary, Bateson focused on how groups of women and groups of men (especially the honorees' mothers' brothers) seemingly inverted their everyday, gendered-norms for dress, behavior, and emotional expression. For the most part, these groups of people belonged to different patrilineages who not only did not regularly renew their marriage alliances, but also interacted through the mode he called schismogenesis. Men and women, too, interacted in this mode. And thus the naven ritual served to correct schismogenesis, enabling the society to endure.

In his 1936 book Naven, Bateson defined schismogenesis as "a process of differentiation in the norms of individual behaviour resulting from cumulative interaction between individuals" (p. 175). He continued:

It is at once apparent that many systems of relationship, either between individuals or groups of individuals, contain a tendency towards progressive change. If, for example, one of the patterns of cultural behaviour, considered appropriate in individual A, is culturally labelled as an assertive pattern, while B is expected to reply to this with what is culturally regarded as submission, it is likely that this submission will encourage a further assertion, and that this assertion will demand still further submission. We have thus a potentially progressive state of affairs, and unless other factors are present to restrain the excesses of assertive and submissive behaviour, A must necessarily become more and more assertive, while B will become more and more submissive; and this progressive change will occur whether A and B are separate individuals or members of complementary groups (p. 176).

Progressive changes of this sort we may describe as complementary schismogenesis. But there is another pattern of relationships between individuals or groups of individuals which equally contains the germs of progressive change. If, for example, we find boasting as the cultural pattern of behaviour in one group, and that the other group replies to this with boasting, a competitive situation may develop in which boasting leads to more boasting, and so on. This type of progressive change we may call symmetrical schismogenesis (pp. 176–177).

Bateson understood the symmetrical form of schismogenic behavior among Iatmul men – somewhat analogously to Émile Durkheim's concepts of mechanical and organic solidarity (see functionalism) – as a competitive relationship between categorical equals (e.g., rivalry). Thus one man, or a group of men, boast, and another man/group must offer an equal or better boast, prompting the first group to respond accordingly, and so forth. Complementary schismogenesis among the Iatmul was observed by Bateson between mainly men and women, or between categorical unequals (e.g., dominance and submission). Men would act dominant, leading women to act submissive, to which men responded with more dominance, and so forth. In both types of schismogenesis, the everyday emotional norms or ethos of Iatmul men and women prevented a halt to schismogenesis. The crux of the matter for Bateson was that, left unchecked, either form of schismogenesis would cause Iatmul society simply to break apart. Thus some social or cultural mechanism was needed by society to maintain social integration. That mechanism among the Iatmul was the naven rite. Bateson's specific contribution was to suggest that certain concrete ritual behaviors either inhibited or stimulated the schismogenic relationship in its various forms.

In The Dawn of Everything (2021), anthropologist David Graeber and archaeologist David Wengrow suggest that schismogenesis can describe differences between societies, as groups define themselves against their neighbors. Some examples of this would be Ancient Athens and Sparta, and the indigenous peoples of the Pacific Northwest Coast and the indigenous peoples of California.

=== In natural resource management ===
Bateson's treatment of conflict escalation has been used to explain how conflicts arise over natural resources, including human-predator conflicts in Norway and also for conflicts among stakeholder groups in shared fisheries. In the latter case, Harrison and Loring compare conflict schismogenesis to the Tragedy of the Commons, arguing that it is a similar kind of escalation of behavior also caused by the failure of social institutions to ensure equity in fisheries-management outcomes.

=== In music ===
Steven Feld (1994, p. 265-271), apparently in response to R. Murray Schafer's schizophonia and borrowing the term from Bateson, employs schismogenesis to name the recombination and recontextualization of sounds split from their sources.

=== In modern warfare and politics ===
There is documented usage of schismogenesis techniques by the U.S. Office of Strategic Services (OSS, an institutional precursor to the Central Intelligence Agency (CIA)), against Japanese-held territories in the Pacific during World War II. U.S. military academics have identified how China and Russia have pursued social-media strategies of schismogenesis against the U.S. and other Western liberal democracies in an attempt to polarize civil society across the political spectrum to damage policy-making processes and to weaken state/military power. Similarly, scholars in Ukraine have documented how Russia has relied on a strategy of schismogenesis to undermine Ukrainian identity and values as a way of promoting pro-Russian territories that can be used against Kyiv, to include forming their own militias which operate alongside Russian special operation forces.

=== In religion ===
The concept of schismogenesis has relevance to the numerous schisms which have occurred within religious thought and practice.

== Types ==
Bateson, in Steps to an Ecology of Mind describes the two forms of schismogenesis and proposes that both forms are self-destructive to the parties involved. He goes on to suggest that researchers look into methods that one or both parties may employ to stop a schismogenesis before it reaches its destructive stage.

=== Complementary schismogenesis ===
The first type of schismogenesis is best characterized by a class struggle, but is defined more broadly to include a range of other possible social phenomena. Given two groups of people, the interaction between them is such that a behavior X from one side elicits a behavior Y from the other side, The two behaviors complement one another, exemplified in the dominant-submissive behaviors of a class struggle. Furthermore, the behaviors may exaggerate one another, leading to a severe rift and possible conflict. Conflict can be reduced by narrowing information asymmetries between the two groups.

=== Symmetrical schismogenesis ===
The second type of schismogenesis is best shown by an arms race. The behaviors of the parties involved elicit similar or symmetrical behaviors from the other parties. In the case of the United States and the Soviet Union, each party continually sought to amass more nuclear weapons than the other party, a clearly fruitless but seemingly necessary endeavor on both sides.

A form of symmetrical schismogenesis exists in common sporting events, where the rules are the same for both teams.

== Interpersonal communication ==
In the field of communication, complementary schismogenesis is a force that can take effect in a conversation where people have different conversational styles, "creating a split in a mutually aggravating way". The effect causes two well-meaning individuals having a conversation to ramp up different styles, resulting in a disagreement that does not stem from actual difference of opinion. For example, if one person's conversational style favoured louder voices, while the other favoured softer speech, the first person might increase the loudness in their voice while the other spoke softer and softer, each trying to lead the conversation towards their style's conception of normal talking.

== Systems of holding back ==
Systems of holding back are also a form of schismogenesis. They are defined as "mutually aggregating spirals which lead people to hold back contributions they could make because others hold back contributions they could make."

In systems intelligence literature, it is held that “human interaction has a tendency to slide into such systems of holding back unless conscious effort is launched to counter this tendency.” For example, although most managers would want to give support to their team and most team members would like to receive such support many times support does not result. This is because both parties might feel that the other party is not giving enough and thus they will themselves hold back what they in the best case could give. It has been suggested that systems of holding back are “the single most important key to life-decreasing, reciprocity-trivializing and vitality-downgrading mechanisms in human life.”
