= John Weakland =

American family therapist (1919 – 1995)

John H. Weakland (8 January 1919 – 18 July 1995) was one of the founders of brief and family psychotherapy. At the time of his death, he was a senior research fellow at the Mental Research Institute (MRI) in Palo Alto, California, co-director of the famous Brief Therapy Center at MRI, and a clinical associate professor emeritus in the Department of Psychiatry and Behavioral Sciences at the Stanford University School of Medicine.

== A brief biography ==
Weakland was a native of Charleston, West Virginia He was a brilliant student who entered Cornell University at the age of 16 and received a degree in chemical engineering. He worked as a chemical engineer with various companies (including DuPont, M.W. Kellog Company) before a chance encounter with Gregory Bateson led him to pursue anthropology at Columbia University. While at Columbia, he worked on the Cultures at a Distance Project with Margaret Mead and Ruth Benedict. Weakland never obtained his doctorate from Columbia; rejecting his adviser's criticisms of his thesis, he refused to rewrite it.

At Bateson's invitation, Weakland moved to California with his wife, Anna Wu Weakland to participate in research. Weakland was the first person Bateson asked to join a research project that would become known as the Bateson Project that helped to give birth to family therapy and co-authored the seminal paper, "Towards a Theory of Schizophrenia" Weakland was also an early student and researcher of Milton Erickson.

Joining the Mental Research Institute in the early 1960s, Weakland was a founding member and co-director of MRI's Brief Therapy Center (along with Paul Watzlawick and Dick Fisch). This center helped to inspire many of the more influential psychotherapy approaches in brief and family therapy. Weakland mentored and befriended many therapists who would go on to make major contributions to the field.

Weakland died in Los Altos, California.

== Quotations ==
Weakland has often been quoted as saying

When you have a problem, life is the same damn thing over and over. When you no longer have a problem, life is one damn thing after another.

Weakland's final appeal to the field was published weeks before his death from ALS. He wrote in a letter to the Family Therapy Networker that:

While not always easy, one of the strengths of the field from its earliest days has been constructive reflection and discussion of its diversity. The emphasis on having things "my way" and needing something new each year has distracted us from serious and useful dialogue about what aids people in distress and facilitates change.

== Books ==
- Change: Principles of Problem Formation and Problem Resolution, with Paul Watzlawick and Richard Fisch (WW Norton, NY, 1974)
- The Tactics of Change: Doing Therapy Briefly, with Richard Fisch and Lynn Segal (Jossey Bass, SF, 1982)
- The Interactional View: Studies at the Mental Research Institute, Palo Alto, 1965–1974, edited with Paul Watzlawick (WW Norton, NY, 1979)
- Rigor and Imagination, Essays from the Legacy of Gregory Bateson, edited with Carol Wilder-Mott (Praeger, NY, 1981)
- Propagations: Thirty Years of Influence From the Mental Research Institute, edited with Wendel Ray (The Haworth Press, Inc., 1995)
