= Laurence J. Kirmayer =

Psychiatrist, academic, professor, director, Editor-in-chief

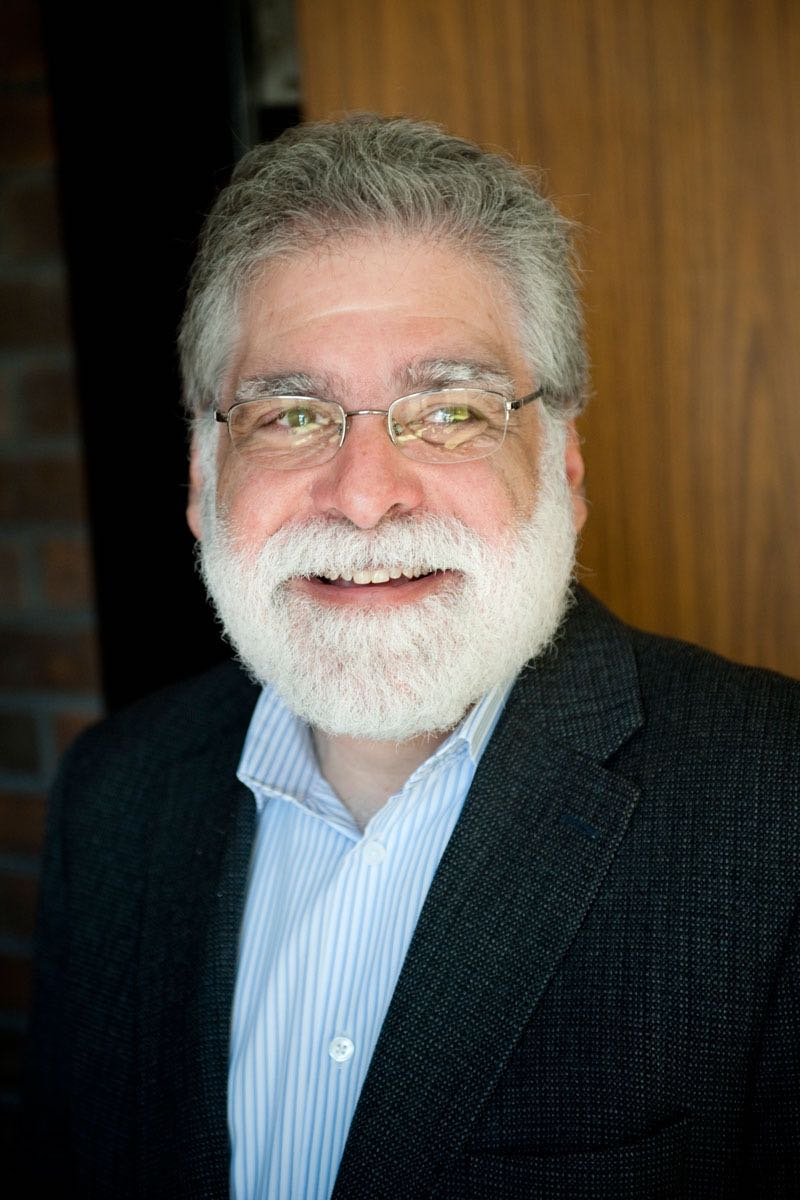
- Professor Laurence Kirmayer
- Born: October 23, 1952 (age 74); Montreal, Quebec, Canada
- Education: McGill University (BSc, MD); UC Davis Medical Center (residency)
- Known for: McGill Illness Narrative Interview; Cultural Consultation Service; Cultural–ecosocial systems approach to psychiatry
- Title: Distinguished James McGill Professor
- Awards: FRSC (2015); FCAHS (2013)
- Scientific career
- Fields: Cultural psychiatry Psychiatric anthropology Philosophy of psychiatry
- Workplaces: McGill University; Lady Davis Institute; Jewish General Hospital

Laurence J. Kirmayer (born October 23, 1952 in Montreal, Quebec) is a Canadian psychiatrist and expert in culture and mental health. He is Distinguished James McGill Professor and Director of the Division of Social and Transcultural Psychiatry, Department of Psychiatry, McGill University. He is a Fellow of the Canadian Academy of Health Sciences and the Royal Society of Canada (Academy of Social Sciences)

From 1991 through 2022, he was Editor-in-Chief of Transcultural Psychiatry, the official journal of the Section on Transcultural Psychiatry of the World Psychiatric Association. Currently, he is Editor-in-Chief Emeritus.

From 2021 to 2023, he was President of the Society for Psychological Anthropology of the American Anthropological Association.

== Career ==
Kirmayer completed undergraduate training in psychology (1971-1974) and in medicine (1974-78) at McGill University and an internship and residency in psychiatry (1978–81) at the University of California, Davis Medical Center in Sacramento, California. He is a Senior Investigator at the Lady Davis Institute, and Director of the Culture & Mental Health Research Unit at the Institute of Community and Family Psychiatry, Jewish General Hospital in Montreal.

In 1991, he founded the annual McGill Summer Program in Social and Cultural Psychiatry. In Canada, he also founded the national Network for Aboriginal Mental Health Research, the Cultural Consultation Service, and the online Multicultural Mental Health Resource Centre which are based at the Institute of Community and Family Psychiatry of the Jewish General Hospital.

== Work ==
His work has contributed to the development of culturally responsive services and interventions in primary care mental health and psychiatry. He has conducted research on the impact of culture and social context on common mental disorders (depression, anxiety, somatization, dissociation, and trauma-related disorders), symptom experience, and processes of resilience, healing and recovery among Indigenous peoples, migrants and marginalized groups. His most recent work has applied theories of embodied and enactive cognitive science to understand the social determinants of health and illness experience and resilience.

He has done epidemiological and ethnographic research on the mental health of Indigenous peoples in collaboration with communities and Indigenous scholars. This includes studies on Inuit concepts of mental health and illness, risk and protective factors for suicide among Inuit youth, Indigenous concepts of resilience, and mental health promotion for Indigenous youth. With Gail Guthrie Valaskakis, he edited the first book integrating social science and clinical perspectives on the mental health of Indigenous peoples in Canada.

Much of his early research concerned somatization, the bodily expression of psychiatric, psychological or emotional distress and medically unexplained symptoms. He clarified several distinct definitions of somatization and conducted clinical and community epidemiological studies of the cognitive and social correlates of somatoform disorders. With sociologist James Robbins, he co-developed the Symptom Interpretation Questionnaire, a measure of somatic symptom attribution that predicts high levels of health care utilization, persistent somatization, hypochondriacal worry, low rates of physician detection of psychosocial distress, and chronicity of fatigue in primary care patients.

He also co-developed the McGill Illness Narrative Interview, a method for eliciting and studying explanatory models and help-seeking, which has been translated into over 15 languages and widely used in global mental health and clinical ethnographic research.

He has worked to translate insights from cultural psychology and anthropology into new approaches to thinking about culture and social context in clinical settings. This includes establishing an innovative Cultural Consultation Service (CCS) to address cultural diversity in mental health care in primary and specialty care sectors. The CCS model has been adopted in Australia, France, Germany, the Netherlands, Spain, Sweden, Switzerland, the US and UK. Analysis of CCS data demonstrated the impact of systematic attention to culture on diagnosis and treatment and contributed to the development of the DSM-5 Cultural Formulation Interview. He led workgroups for the Canadian Collaboration for Immigrant and Refugee Health developing guidelines for the primary care prevent and treatment of common mental health problems. For the Canadian Psychiatric Association, he has led workgroups developing guidelines for training in cultural psychiatry and on cultural issues in the psychiatric training of international medical graduates.

Kirmayer also has made contributions to medical and psychological anthropology and the philosophy of psychiatry. He has collaborated on applying 4-E cognitive science to psychiatry and developing a model of cultural affordances in computational neuroscience. He has worked extensively on questions of the cognitive and social process of meaning-making in illness experience, developing theories of metaphoric embodiment and enactment of symptom experience and its ritual and therapeutic transformation. Most recently, he has advocated for an integrative cultural-ecosocial systems approach to understanding mental health and illness.

== Awards ==
- 2025 Wen-Shing Tseng Lifetime Achievement Award, World Association for Cultural Psychiatry.
- 2021 Judd Marmor Award, for contributions advancing the biopsychosocial model, American Psychiatric Association.
- 2020 Distinguished Contribution to Family Systems Research Award, American Family Therapy Academy.
- 2018 Goffredo Bartocci Special Achievement Award, World Association for Cultural Psychiatry.
- 2018 AMI-Québec Exemplary Psychiatrist Award.
- 2016 Walter J. Lonner Distinguished Invited Lecturer, International Association for Cross-Cultural Psychology.
- 2015 Fellow, Royal Society of Canada (Social Sciences Division of the Academy of Social Sciences).
- 2015 World Association for Cultural Psychiatry Creative Scholarship Award for “Cultural Consultation: Encountering the Other in Mental Health Care.”
- 2014 Dr. Praful Chandarana Award, Indo-Canadian Psychiatric Association.
- 2013 Fellow, Canadian Academy of Health Sciences.
- 2010 Lifetime Achievement Award, Society for the Study of Psychiatry and Culture.
- 2006 Creative Scholarship Award, Society for the Study of Psychiatry and Culture.
- 2004 Presidential commendation for dedication in advancing cultural psychiatry, Canadian Psychiatric Association.

== Bibliography ==
His publications include the books:

- Healing and the Invention of Metaphor: Toward a Poetics of Illness Experience. Cambridge: Cambridge University Press, 2025. ISBN 9781009617789
- Unraveling the World-Knot: Mind-Body Problems in Clinical Context. Cambridge: Cambridge University Press, 2026. ISBN 9781009772099

and over 400 articles and book chapters as well as several co-edited volumes:

- Current Concepts of Somatization: Research and Clinical Perspectives, edited by Laurence J. Kirmayer and James M. Robbins. Washington: American Psychiatric Association, 1991. ISBN 0880481986
- Understanding Trauma: Integrating Biological, Clinical and Cultural Perspectives, edited by Laurence J. Kirmayer, Robert Lemelson, & Mark Barad. New York: Cambridge University Press, 2007. ISBN 0521888409
- Healing Traditions: The Mental Health of Aboriginal Peoples in Canada, edited by Laurence J. Kirmayer and Gail Guthrie Valaskakis. Vancouver: UBC Press, 2009. ISBN 9780774815239
- Cultural Consultation: Encountering the Other in Mental Health Care, edited by Laurence J. Kirmayer, Jaswant Guzder, and Cécile Rousseau. New York: Springer, 2013. ISBN 9781493926923
- Revisioning Psychiatry: Cultural Phenomenology, Critical Neuroscience, and Global Mental Health, edited by Laurence J. Kirmayer, Robert Lemelson, and Constance A. Cummings. New York: Cambridge University Press, 2015. ISBN 9781107032200
- DSM-5® Handbook on the Cultural Formulation Interview, edited by Robert Lewis-Fernandez, Neil Krishan Aggarwal, Ladson Hinton, Devon Hinton and Laurence J. Kirmayer. Washington: American Psychiatric Pub, 2015. ISBN 9781585624928
- Cultural Clinical Psychology and PTSD. edited by Andreas Maercker, Eva Heim, and Laurence J. Kirmayer. Boston: Hogrefe Publishing GmbH, 2019 ISBN 9781616764975
- Culture, Mind, and Brain: Emerging Concepts, Models and Applications, edited by Laurence J. Kirmayer, Carol M. Worthman, Shinobu Kitayama, Robert Lemelson, and Constance A. Cummings. New York: Cambridge University Press, 2020. ISBN 1108705960

== Lectures ==
Video recordings of Kirmayer's lectures in cultural psychiatry are available online

Video interviews as part of an oral history of medical anthropology from Anthropologie et Societé are also available

== See also ==
- Cross-cultural psychiatry
- Cultural neuroscience
- Culture-bound syndrome
- Foundation for Psychocultural Research
- Indigenous peoples of the Americas
- Medically unexplained physical symptoms
- Robert Lemelson
- Suicide in Canada
- Transcultural Psychiatry
