= Pietro Scalia =

Italian-American film editor

- Born: March 17, 1960 (age 66); Catania, Sicily, Italy
- Education: University of California, Los Angeles (MFA)
- Occupations: Film editor, producer
- Awards: See below

Pietro Scalia (born March 17, 1960) is an Italian-American film editor and producer, best known for his work with directors Ridley Scott, Gus Van Sant and Oliver Stone. He has won two Academy Awards for Best Film Editing, for Stone's JFK (1991) and Black Hawk Down (2001), out of four total nominations. His other accolades include two American Cinema Editors Awards, two BAFTA Awards, and a Satellite Award.

== Early life and education ==
He was born in Catania, Sicily, and later emigrated to Aarau, Switzerland as a child with his parents. There, he attended Swiss-German schools until high school.

After graduation, he decided to move to the United States to pursue his college education. He spent two years at the University at Albany, The State University of New York, after which he was accepted as an undergraduate at UCLA. The Swiss government's scholarship helped him through five years of UCLA and in 1985 he earned his Master of Fine Arts from the UCLA Film School.

== Career ==
=== Assistant editor ===
After his MFA, a couple of short films, a screenplay, two video documentaries, and a 16 mm thesis film, he returned to Europe to pursue his desire to become a film director. Shortly afterward, he returned to the United States on a work visa to pursue his career in Hollywood as a film editor. He began as an assistant editor on Andrei Konchalovsky's Shy People. Later, he received an assistant editor position working with Oliver Stone. However, it was not easy to get the job. Scalia admired Oliver Stone's work, especially Salvador, so he decided he wanted to work with that director. He got a contact through the sister of one of the assistant editors. Scalia worked on such films as Wall Street (1987) and Talk Radio (1988). He later continued as an associate editor on Born on the Fourth of July and as an additional editor on The Doors.

=== Editor ===
After five years of working with Oliver Stone, Scalia was finally asked to fully edit a film. It was JFK, for which Scalia and his co-editor, Joe Hutshing, were honored with an Academy Award for Film Editing. Craig McKay was nominated the same year for editing The Silence of the Lambs. Scalia edited a sequel to the movie, Hannibal ten years later. He also received a BAFTA Award and A.C.E. Award for his work.

Pietro Scalia worked with Bernardo Bertolucci on Little Buddha (1993) and Stealing Beauty (1996), as well as with Sam Raimi on The Quick and the Dead (1995). He earned two more Academy Award nominations: first in 1997 for Good Will Hunting and second in 2000 for Gladiator, and a second Academy Award for director Ridley Scott's Black Hawk Down. He also edited G.I. Jane and a pilot episode of a TV series American Gothic in late 1990s.

In the recent years, Scalia edited such movies as Levity (2003) directed by Ed Solomon, a documentary entitled Ashes and Snow, The Great Raid directed by John Dahl, and Memoirs of a Geisha, one of the most publicized movies of 2005, directed by Rob Marshall. Scalia also worked on Hannibal Rising, a movie that tells a story of a teenaged Hannibal and his young sister Mischa Lecter after their parents are killed in World War II. It was directed by Peter Webber and released in 2007. He has a long lasting relationship with Ridley Scott working on movies such as American Gangster in 2007, Body of Lies in 2008 and Robin Hood in 2010. Most recently he worked with director Ridley Scott on The Martian, released in October 2015. In May 2017, Scalia replaced editor Chris Dickens on the film Solo: A Star Wars Story, which was released in May 2018.

== Personal life ==
Scalia lives in Los Angeles with his wife Teresa Sparks and two children, Julian and Maia Scalia.

== Filmography ==
Key
†	Denotes titles that have not yet been released

=== Film ===
Editor
Year	Film	Director	Notes
1990	Megaville	Peter Lehner	
1991	JFK	Oliver Stone	
1992	Jackpot	Mario Orfini	
1993	Little Buddha	Bernardo Bertolucci	
1995	The Quick and the Dead	Sam Raimi	
1996	Stealing Beauty	Bernardo Bertolucci	
1997	G.I. Jane	Ridley Scott	1st of 11 collaborations with Scott
1997	Good Will Hunting	Gus Van Sant	
1998	The Big Hit	Che-Kirk Wong	
1998	Playing by Heart	Willard Carroll	
2000	Gladiator	Ridley Scott	
2001	Hannibal	Ridley Scott	Also music producer
2001	Black Hawk Down	Ridley Scott	
2003	Levity	Ed Solomon	
2003	Masked and Anonymous	Larry Charles	Also associate producer
2005	The Great Raid	John Dahl	
2005	Memoirs of a Geisha	Rob Marshall	
2007	Hannibal Rising	Peter Webber	
2007	American Gangster	Ridley Scott	
2008	Body of Lies	Ridley Scott	
2010	Kick-Ass	Matthew Vaughn	
2010	Robin Hood	Ridley Scott	
2012	Prometheus	Ridley Scott	
2012	Ghost Recon: Alpha	François Alaux; Hervé de Crécy	Short film
2012	The Amazing Spider-Man	Marc Webb	
2013	The Counselor	Ridley Scott	Also music supervisor
2014	The Amazing Spider-Man 2	Marc Webb	
2015	Child 44	Daniel Espinosa	
2015	The Sea of Trees	Gus Van Sant	Also co-producer
2015	The Martian	Ridley Scott	
2016	13 Hours: The Secret Soldiers of Benghazi	Michael Bay	
2017	Alien: Covenant	Ridley Scott	
2018	Solo: A Star Wars Story	Ron Howard	
2022	Ambulance	Michael Bay	
2022	Morbius	Daniel Espinosa	Also associate producer
2022	The Gray Man	Russo brothers	
2023	Ferrari	Michael Mann	
2024	His Mother	Maia Scalia	Short film
2026	Whalefall	Brian Duffield	

Other credits
Year	Film	Director	Contribution	Notes
1985	Over the Summer	Teresa Sparks	Sound editor, camera assistant	
1987	Shy People	Andrei Konchalovsky	First assistant editor	
1987	Wall Street	Oliver Stone	Assistant editor	1st of 5 collaborations with Stone
1988	Cameron's Closet	Armand Mastroianni	Assistant editor	
1988	Haunted Summer	Ivan Passer	Assistant editor	
1988	Talk Radio	Oliver Stone	Assistant editor	
1989	Born on the Fourth of July	Oliver Stone	Associate editor	
1991	The Doors	Oliver Stone	Additional editor	
1995	White Man's Burden	Desmond Nakano	Consulting editor	
2004	Incident at Loch Ness	Zak Penn	Actor	Role; as Himself

=== Television ===
Editor
Year	Title	Notes
1995	American Gothic	Episode: "Pilot"

=== Documentaries ===
Editor
Year	Title	Director
2005	Ashes and Snow	Gregory Colbert
2007	The 11th Hour	Leila Conners; Nadia Conners
2009	40 Years of Silence: An Indonesian Tragedy	Robert Lemelson

Other credits
Year	Title	Role
2007	Breaking the Ice	Supervising editor

== Awards and nominations ==
Institution	Year	Category	Work	Result
Academy Awards	1992	Best Film Editing	JFK	Won
Academy Awards	1998	Best Film Editing	Good Will Hunting	Nominated
Academy Awards	2001	Best Film Editing	Gladiator	Nominated
Academy Awards	2002	Best Film Editing	Black Hawk Down	Won
American Film Institute Awards	2002	Editor of the Year	Black Hawk Down	Nominated
BAFTA Awards	1993	Best Editing	JFK	Won
BAFTA Awards	2001	Best Editing	Gladiator	Won
BAFTA Awards	2002	Best Editing	Black Hawk Down	Nominated
BAFTA Awards	2008	Best Editing	American Gangster	Nominated
BAFTA Awards	2016	Best Editing	The Martian	Nominated
Camerimage	2008	Special Award (for Editor with Unique Visual Sensitivity)	—N/a	Won
Critics' Choice Movie Awards	2016	Best Editing	The Martian	Nominated
David di Donatello	1996	Best Editing	Stealing Beauty	Nominated
Locarno Film Festival	2023	Vision Award	—N/a	Won
Nastro d'Argento	2006	Special Award (for editing)	Memoirs of a Geisha	Won
Nastro d'Argento	2014	Best Editing	The Counselor, The Amazing Spider-Man 2	Nominated
Satellite Awards	2001	Best Editing	Gladiator	Nominated
Satellite Awards	2007	Best Editing	American Gangster	Won
Satellite Awards	2016	Best Editing	The Martian	Nominated
