= Afflictions: Culture & Mental Illness in Indonesia =

Afflictions: Culture and Mental Illness in Indonesia
- Directed by: Robert Lemelson
- Produced by: Robert Lemelson
- Music by: Malcom Cross
- Production company: Elemental Productions
- Release date: 2010
- Running time: 185 minutes
- Country: Indonesia
- Language: English

Afflictions: Culture and Mental Illness in Indonesia is a six-part ethnographic documentary film series on the lives of the mentally ill living on the islands of Bali and Java in Indonesia. Each film documents the personal journey of a patient's diagnosis, care and treatment and the impact of culture, family, and community on the course of their illness. The films were directed and produced by ethnographic filmmaker and psychological anthropologist Robert Lemelson.

The films are based on Lemelson's ethnographic research from 1997 to 2010 on the relationship of psychiatric and neuropsychiatric disorders to culture. It is the first film series on mental illness in the developing world. Some emerging themes include: attitudes of family members, the power of culture in mental health outcomes, the merits of pharmaceutical treatment, and the importance of cultural context in understanding the experiences of the mentally ill.

== Films ==
Film	Release date	Directed by	Edited by	Runtime
Volume 1 - Psychotic Disorders
Shadows and Illuminations	2010	Robert Lemelson	Wing Ko	35 minutes
Memory of My Face	2011	Robert Lemelson	Sandra Angeline and Chisako Yokoyama	22 minutes
Ritual Burdens	2011	Robert Lemelson	Herbert Bennett and Mike Mallen	25 minutes
Volume 2 - Neuropsychiatric Disorders
The Bird Dancer	2010	Robert Lemelson	Herbert Bennett	40 minutes
Family Victim	2010	Robert Lemelson	Sandra Angeline	38 minutes
Kites & Monsters	2011	Robert Lemelson	Chisako Yokoyama	22 minutes

== Book ==
Afflictions: Steps Toward a Visual Psychological Anthropology discusses and complements the work presented in Afflictions: Culture and Mental Illness in Indonesia in order to explore issues in the cross-cultural study of mental illness and advocate for the role film can play both in the discipline and in participants’ lives. It integrates psychological and medical anthropology with the methodologies of visual anthropology, specifically ethnographic film.

== See also ==
- Health in Indonesia
