= Prometheus (2012 film) =

Film by Ridley Scott

- Theatrical release poster
- Directed by: Ridley Scott
- Written by: Jon Spaihts; Damon Lindelof
- Produced by: David Giler; Walter Hill; Ridley Scott
- Starring: Noomi Rapace; Michael Fassbender; Guy Pearce; Idris Elba; Logan Marshall-Green; Charlize Theron
- Cinematography: Dariusz Wolski
- Edited by: Pietro Scalia
- Music by: Marc Streitenfeld
- Production companies: 20th Century Fox; Scott Free Productions; Brandywine Productions; Dune Entertainment
- Distributed by: 20th Century Fox
- Release dates: May 31, 2012 (Empire); June 1, 2012 (United Kingdom); June 8, 2012 (United States)
- Running time: 124 minutes
- Countries: United Kingdom; United States
- Language: English
- Budget: $120–130 million
- Box office: $403.4 million

Prometheus is a 2012 science fiction horror film directed by Ridley Scott and written by Jon Spaihts and Damon Lindelof. It is the fifth installment of the Alien film series and features an ensemble cast including Noomi Rapace, Michael Fassbender, Guy Pearce, Idris Elba, Logan Marshall-Green, and Charlize Theron. Set in the late 21st century, the film centers on the crew of the spaceship Prometheus as it follows a star map discovered among the artifacts of several ancient Earth cultures. Seeking the origins of humanity, the crew arrives on a distant world and discovers a threat that could cause human extinction.

Scott and director James Cameron developed ideas for a film that would serve as a prequel to Scott's science-fiction horror film Alien (1979). In 2002, the development of Alien vs. Predator (2004) took precedence, and the project remained dormant until 2009 when Scott again showed interest. Spaihts wrote a script for a prequel to the events of the Alien films, but Scott opted for a different direction to avoid repeating cues from those films. In late 2010, Lindelof joined the project to rewrite Spaihts' script, and he and Scott developed a story that precedes the story of Alien but is not directly connected to the original series. According to Scott, although the film shares "strands of Alien's DNA," and takes place in the same universe, Prometheus explores its own mythology and ideas.

Prometheus entered production in April 2010, with extensive design phases during which the technology and creatures that the film required were developed. Principal photography began in March 2011, with an estimated $120–130 million budget. The film was shot using 3D cameras throughout, almost entirely on practical sets, and on location in England, Iceland, Scotland, Jordan, and Spain. It was promoted with a marketing campaign that included viral activities on the web. Three videos featuring the film's leading actors in character, which expanded on elements of the fictional universe, were released and met with a generally positive reception and awards.

Prometheus was released on June 1, 2012, in the United Kingdom and on June 8, 2012, in North America. The film earned generally positive reviews, receiving praise for the designs, production values, and cast performances. The film grossed over $403 million worldwide. A sequel, Alien: Covenant, was released in May 2017.

== Plot ==
As a spacecraft departs a planet, a tall humanoid alien drinks a black liquid, causing its body to dissolve. Its remains crumble into a waterfall, while its DNA breaks apart and recombines.

In 2089, archaeologists Elizabeth Shaw and Charlie Holloway discover a star map in Scotland that matches others found among unrelated ancient cultures. They interpret it as an invitation from humanity's forerunners, the "Engineers". Peter Weyland, the elderly CEO of Weyland Corporation, funds an expedition aboard the scientific vessel Prometheus to the distant moon LV-223. The crew travel in suspended animation, while the android David monitors the voyage.

The Prometheus lands on the barren, mountainous surface near a large artificial structure. Exploring it, the crew find stone cylinders, a monolithic statue of a humanoid head, and the decapitated corpse of a large alien. Shaw identifies the body as an Engineer and retrieves its head. Other corpses suggest the species is extinct. Crew members Millburn and Fifield become uneasy and try to return to the Prometheus, but become lost inside the structure. A storm forces the expedition to retreat. David secretly takes a cylinder, most of which ooze black liquid. The Engineer's DNA matches that of humans.

David investigates the liquid, deliberately contaminates a drink with a small sample, and offers it to Holloway, who drinks it after saying he would do anything for answers. Shortly afterwards, Shaw and Holloway have sex. Inside the structure, a snake-like creature kills Millburn and sprays corrosive fluid that melts Fifield's helmet, causing him to fall face first into a puddle. David discovers a control room containing an Engineer in stasis and a holographic star map highlighting Earth. Holloway rapidly becomes ill. He is taken back to the Prometheus, but mission director Meredith Vickers refuses him entry and, at his urging, burns him to death with a flamethrower. A medical scan then reveals that Shaw, previously infertile, is pregnant. She uses an automated surgery table to remove a squid-like creature from her abdomen. Shaw subsequently learns that Weyland, Vickers' father, has been in stasis aboard the ship. He intends to ask the Engineers how to overcome old age.

A mutated Fifield returns to the Prometheus and kills several crewmen before Captain Janek kills him. Janek theorises that the structure was an Engineer military base where a biological weapon escaped control. The base also contains a spacecraft. Weyland, David and the team return to the structure with Shaw. David awakens the surviving Engineer and speaks to him in Proto-Indo-European, explaining Weyland's request. The Engineer responds by decapitating David and killing Weyland and his companions, then reactivating the spacecraft. Shaw escapes and warns Janek that the Engineer intends to release the biological weapon on Earth and exterminate humanity. Janek and the remaining crew sacrifice themselves by ramming the Prometheus into the Engineer spacecraft, disabling it and allowing the lifeboat to escape. The spacecraft crashes, crushing Vickers but sparing Shaw.

In the lifeboat, Shaw discovers that the alien offspring she removed is still alive and has grown enormously. The Engineer forces open the airlock and attacks her, but Shaw releases the creature, which subdues him by thrusting an ovipositor down his throat. Shaw recovers David's surviving remains and decides to find the Engineers' home world to discover why they sought humanity's destruction. With David's help, she launches another Engineer spacecraft and leaves LV-223.

In the abandoned lifeboat, an alien creature bursts from the dead Engineer's chest.

== Cast ==
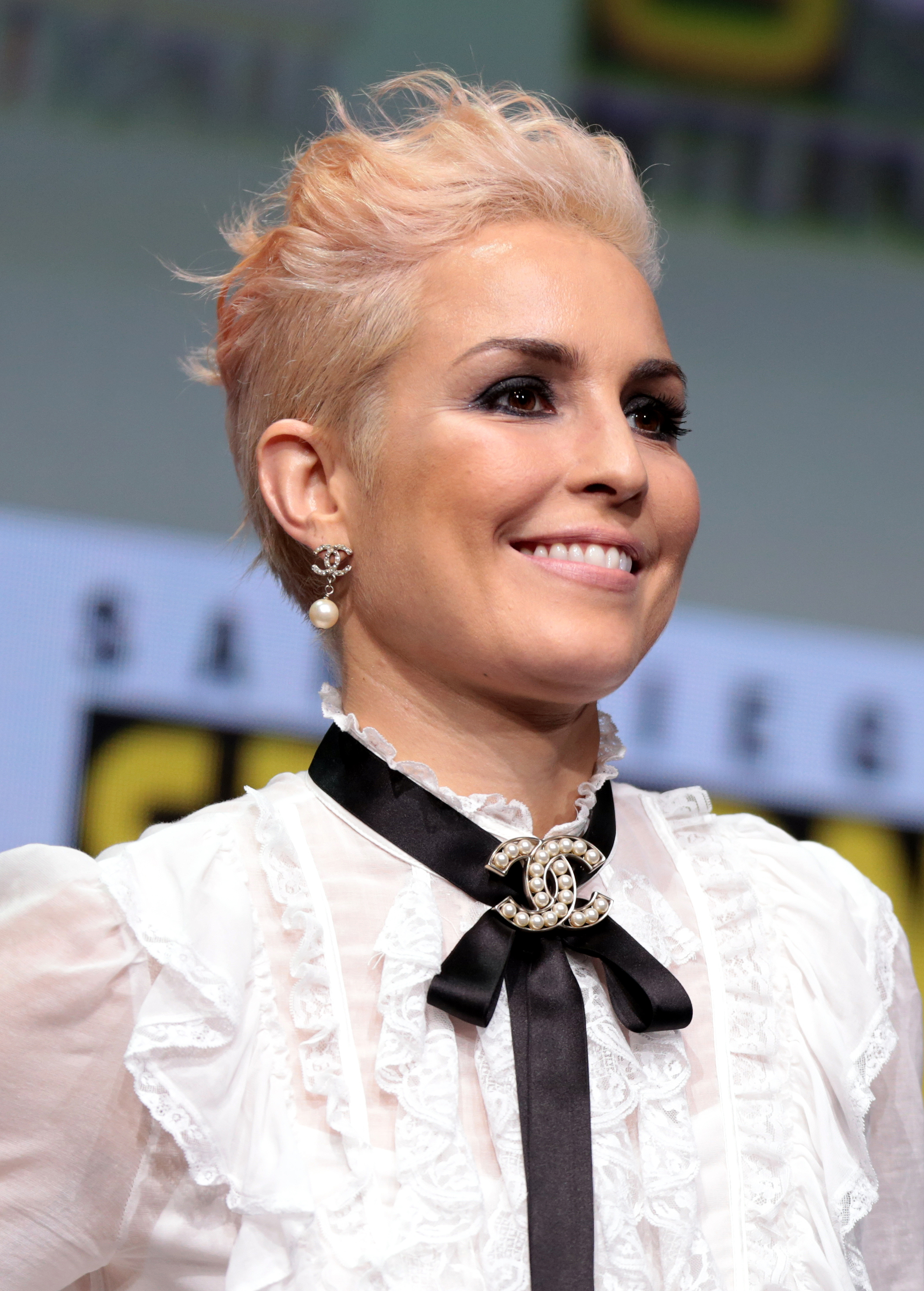
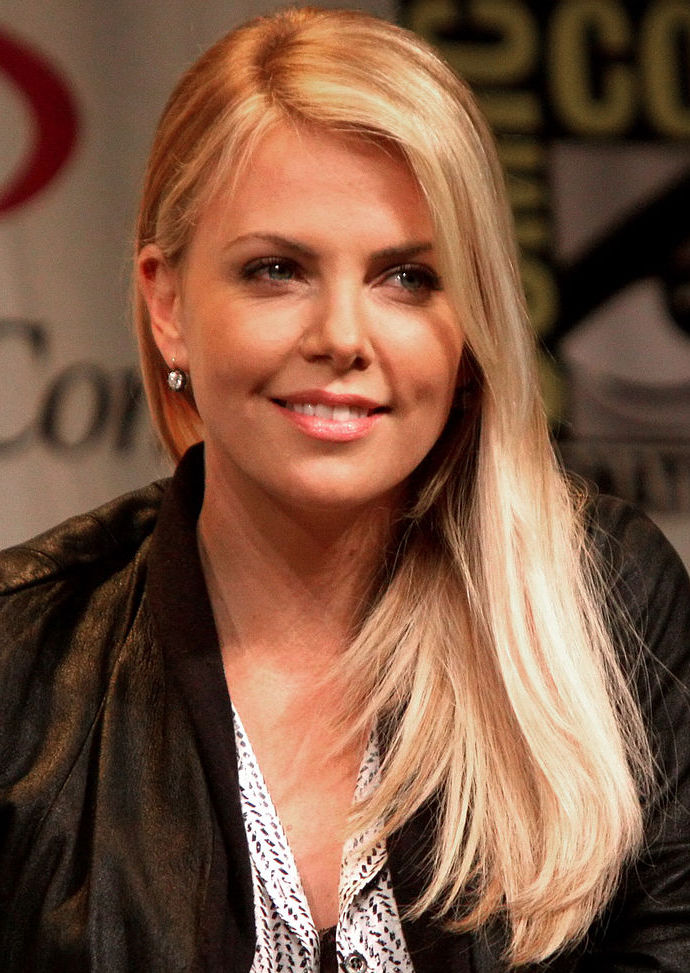
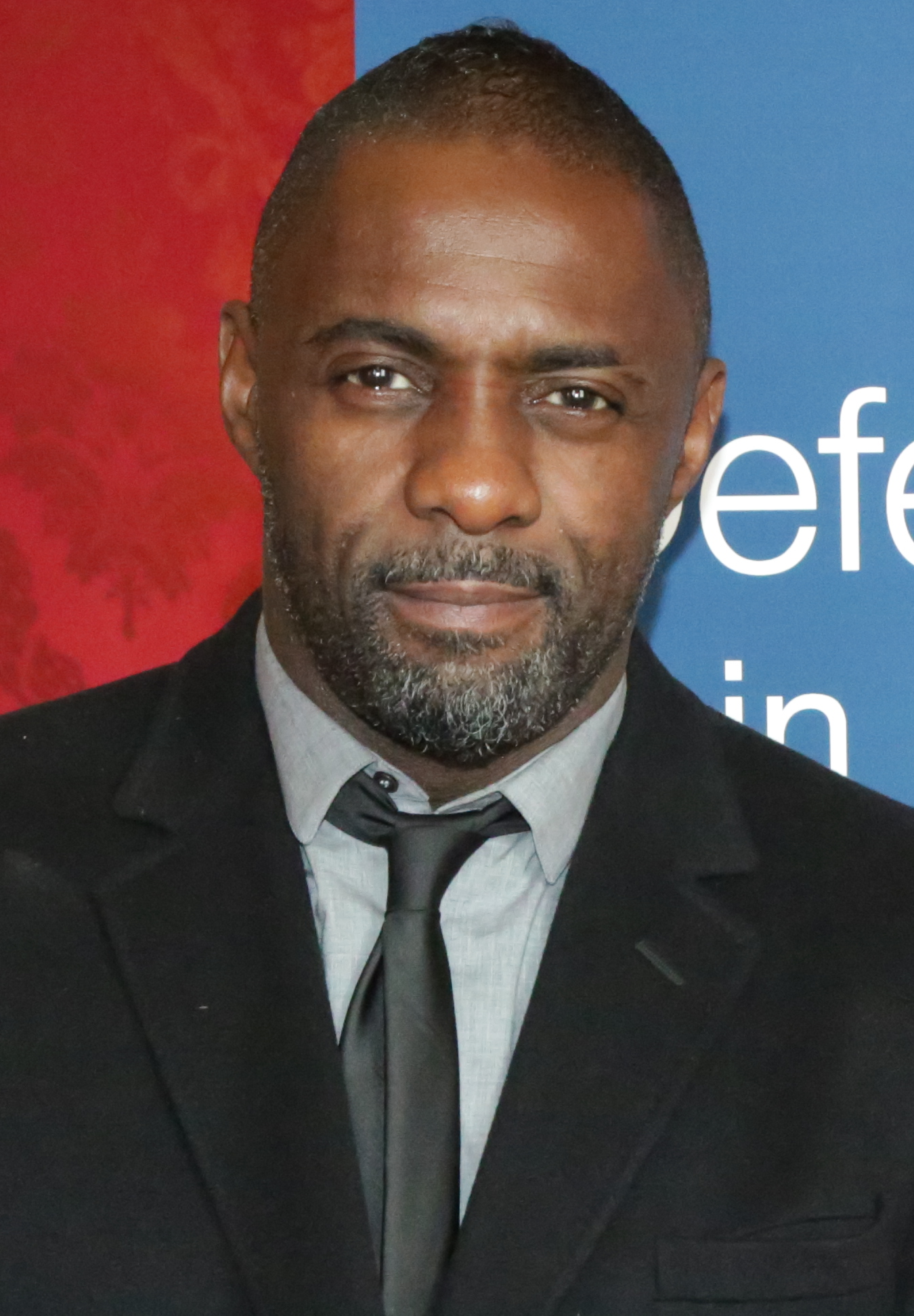
Top to bottom: Noomi Rapace, Charlize Theron, and Idris Elba play Elizabeth Shaw, Meredith Vickers and Janek, respectively
- Noomi Rapace as Elizabeth Shaw:

Rapace described Shaw, an archaeologist, as a believer in God with a very strong faith, and said that, "In the middle of the movie, things happen and she changes into more of a warrior. And in the end, she's such a survivor." To aid her method acting, she developed a complete backstory for Shaw, and worked with a dialect coach to achieve an English accent. She also asked her make-up artist to apply extra blood and sweat during filming to more accurately portray her character. Rapace said, "I was out there filming for about six months and it was super-intense, my body was in so much pain sometimes but it was absolutely amazing." She dismissed comparisons to the Alien franchise's Ellen Ripley. Rapace came to director Ridley Scott's attention for her performance as Lisbeth Salander in the 2009 drama film The Girl with the Dragon Tattoo. She met Scott in August 2010, and by January 2011 she had secured the role. Actresses Anne Hathaway, Natalie Portman, Gemma Arterton, Carey Mulligan, and Abbie Cornish were all considered for the role during development. Lucy Hutchinson, who was eight years old in 2012, portrays Shaw as a child.

- Michael Fassbender as David:

David is an android that acts as the ship's butler and maintenance man. It is designed to be indistinguishable from humans, and begins to develop "its own ego, insecurities, jealousy and envy." Writer Damon Lindelof stated that the character provides a non-human perspective on the film's events, and said, "What does the movie look like from the robot's point of view? If you were to ask him, 'What do you think about all of this? What's going on? What do you think about these humans who are around you?' Wouldn't it be cool if we found a way for that robot to answer those questions?" Fassbender said, "David's views on the human crew are somewhat childlike. He is jealous and arrogant because he realizes that his knowledge is all-encompassing, and therefore he is superior to the humans. David wants to be acknowledged and praised for his brilliance." In developing his character, Fassbender avoided watching the android characters of Alien (1979) and Aliens (1986), and instead studied the replicants in Scott's 1982 science fiction film Blade Runner, with a focus on Sean Young's character Rachael, whose "vacancy" and longing for a soul interested him. Fassbender drew further inspiration from the voice of the HAL 9000 computer in 2001: A Space Odyssey, the "funny walk and economy of movement" of Olympic diver Greg Louganis, and the performances of David Bowie in The Man Who Fell to Earth, Dirk Bogarde in The Servant, and Peter O'Toole in Lawrence of Arabia. David's blond hair was modeled on that of T. E. Lawrence. Scott favored Fassbender for the role; by January 2011 he was confirmed to have joined the cast, despite earlier reports that his agents had sought too high a fee.

- Charlize Theron as Meredith Vickers:

Vickers is a Weyland Corporation employee who is sent to monitor the expedition. Theron described the character as "a suit who slowly sheds [her] skin through the film," and also as "somewhat of a villain ... [who] definitely has an agenda." She stated, "Vickers is pragmatic, and desperately wants to control the situation." Scott wanted the character to lurk in the background of scenes watching other characters instead of being the focus. Theron said that this helped layer her character because "you're just so suspicious of her, instantly." The similarities between the appearances and mannerisms of Vickers and David were intended to raise the possibility that David was based on Vickers's DNA, or that Vickers is an android herself. After Theron was cast in the role, she developed three new scenes with Scott and Lindelof to expand her character. Physical action scenes, some of which involved her running through sand in 30-pound (14 kg) boots, were a problem for Theron. It was intended that Theron would portray Shaw, but a prior commitment to Mad Max: Fury Road prevented her involvement. When that film was delayed, she was able to rejoin Prometheus. Michelle Yeoh and Angelina Jolie were considered for the role.

- Idris Elba as Janek:

Janek is the captain of the Prometheus. Elba described the character as "a longshoreman and a sailor" with a military background. He said, "[Being the captain is] his life and the crew is his responsibility," and, "He's a realistic, pragmatic character. He has to get involved ... in a film with huge ideas, you need a character like this, who can go 'Wait ... why are we doing this?'"

- Guy Pearce as Peter Weyland:

Weyland is the billionaire founder and CEO of Weyland Corp. Lindelof described him as having a massive ego and suffering from a god complex. Applying the necessary prosthetics and make-up to transform Pearce into the aging Weyland took five hours, and an hour to remove it. Pearce observed elderly individuals to gain insight into the movement for his character, as he found replicating the impeded physical movement the most difficult part of the role. Max von Sydow was Scott's original choice to play Weyland, but the casting of Pearce made it possible for him to portray Weyland as both an elderly character and a younger man who appeared in an earlier script draft.

- Logan Marshall-Green as Charlie Holloway:

Holloway is an archaeologist and Shaw's love interest. Marshall-Green was cast after he was seen performing on stage "off-off-off Broadway." He described Holloway as the "X Games-type scientist," and said that he liked the character's "leap-before-looking" philosophy. He also said that Holloway "doesn't want to meet his maker. He wants to stand next to his maker. He's willing to go to the edge to get that." Describing the character's motivation, he said: "He goes to the extreme in everything he does, sometimes for the better, sometimes for the worse of the [Prometheus crew]. I think what drives him is the thrill of the search." Marshall-Green contrasted Holloway with Shaw, and said: "She's the believer. I'm the scientist. I'm the skeptic. I'm the atheist."

- Sean Harris as Fifield:

Fifield is a geologist who has become mentally unstable after many missions. Harris described the character as "someone who can sense when things are up. He's your audience guy, going, 'Don't go in that tunnel. We should not be doing this!'" Fifield's bright red mohawk hairstyle was designed by Harris and Scott based on Scott's sketch of a man with a "severe haircut."

- Rafe Spall as Millburn:

Millburn is a biologist. Spall auditioned for another role, but Scott wanted him to play Millburn. On his casting, Spall said, "Alien is one of the best films ever made, and it's a real buzz to be in a space suit on an Alien set with Ridley Scott coming and speaking to you. It's incredible. That's why I wanted to be an actor, to be in a space suit on an Alien set."

Other cast members include Kate Dickie as the ship's medic, Ford; Emun Elliott and Benedict Wong as, respectively, ship pilots Chance and Ravel; and Patrick Wilson as Shaw's father. Ian Whyte and Daniel James portray Engineers.

== Themes ==
The central theme in Prometheus concerns the eponymous Titan of Greek mythology who defies the gods and gives humanity the gift of fire, for which he is subjected to eternal punishment. The gods want to limit their creations in case they attempt to usurp the gods. The film deals with humanity's relationship with the gods—their creators—and the consequence of defying them. A human expedition intends to find them and receive knowledge about belief, immortality, and death. They find superior beings who appear godlike in comparison to humanity, and the Prometheus crew suffer consequences for their pursuit. Shaw is directly responsible for the events of the plot because she wants her religious beliefs affirmed, and believes she is entitled to answers from her god; her questions remain unanswered and she is punished for her hubris. The film offers similar resolution, providing items of information but leaving the connections and conclusions to the audience, potentially leaving the question unanswered. Further religious allusions are implied by the Engineers' decision to punish humanity with destruction 2,000 years before the events of the film. Scott suggested that an Engineer was sent to Earth to stop humanity's increasing aggression, but was crucified, implying it was Jesus Christ. However, Scott felt that an explicit connection in the film would be "a little too on the nose."

Artificial intelligence, a unifying theme throughout Scott's career as a director, is particularly evident in Prometheus, primarily through the android David. David is like humans but does not want to be like them, eschewing a common theme in "robotic storytelling" such as in Blade Runner. David is created in the image of humanity, and while the human crew of the Prometheus ship searches for their creators expecting answers, David exists among his human creators yet is unimpressed; he questions his creators about why they are seeking their own. Lindelof described the ship as a prison for David. At the conclusion of the film, David's creator (Weyland) is dead and his fundamental programming will end without someone to serve. Lindelof explained that David's programming becomes unclear and that he could be programmed by Shaw or his own sense of curiosity. Following Weyland's death, David is left with Shaw, and is sincere and interested in following her, partly out of survival and partly out of curiosity.

Another theme is creation and the question of "Who Am I? Who Made Me? Why Hast Thou Forsaken Me?". Development of the in-universe mythology explored the Judeo-Christian creation of humanity, but Scott was interested in Greco-Roman and Aztec creation myths about gods who create humans in their own image by sacrificing a piece of themselves. This creation is shown in the film's opening in which an Engineer sacrifices itself after consuming the dark liquid, acting as a "gardener in space" to bring life to a world. One of their expeditions creates humanity, who create artificial life (David) in their own image. David then introduces the dark liquid to Holloway who impregnates a sterile Shaw, and the resulting child impregnates an Engineer, creating the child of all three generations. Scott likened the Engineers to the fallen angels of John Milton's Paradise Lost, and said that humanity was their offspring and not God's.

Shaw is the only religious believer in the crew and openly displays her religious belief with a necklace of a Christian cross. Lindelof said that with her scientific knowledge, her beliefs felt outdated in 2093. Shaw is excited when she learns that she was created by the Engineers and not a supernatural deity, but rather than cause her to lose her faith, it reinforces it. Lindelof said that asking questions and searching for meaning is the point of being alive, and so the audience is left to question whether Shaw was protected by God because of her faith. Scott wanted the film to end with Shaw's declaration that she is still searching for definitive answers. In addition to the religious themes, Lindelof said that Prometheus is pro-science and explores whether scientific knowledge and faith in God can co-exist.

Besides drawing several influences from Paradise Lost, The Atlantic's Govindini Murty noted further influences, and wrote that "[t]he striking images Ridley Scott devises for Prometheus reference everything from Stanley Kubrick's 2001 to Leonardo da Vinci's Vitruvian Man and Mario Bava's Planet of the Vampires. Scott also expands on the original Alien universe by creating a distinctly English mythology informed by Milton's Paradise Lost and the symbolic drawings of William Blake."

== Production ==
=== Development ===
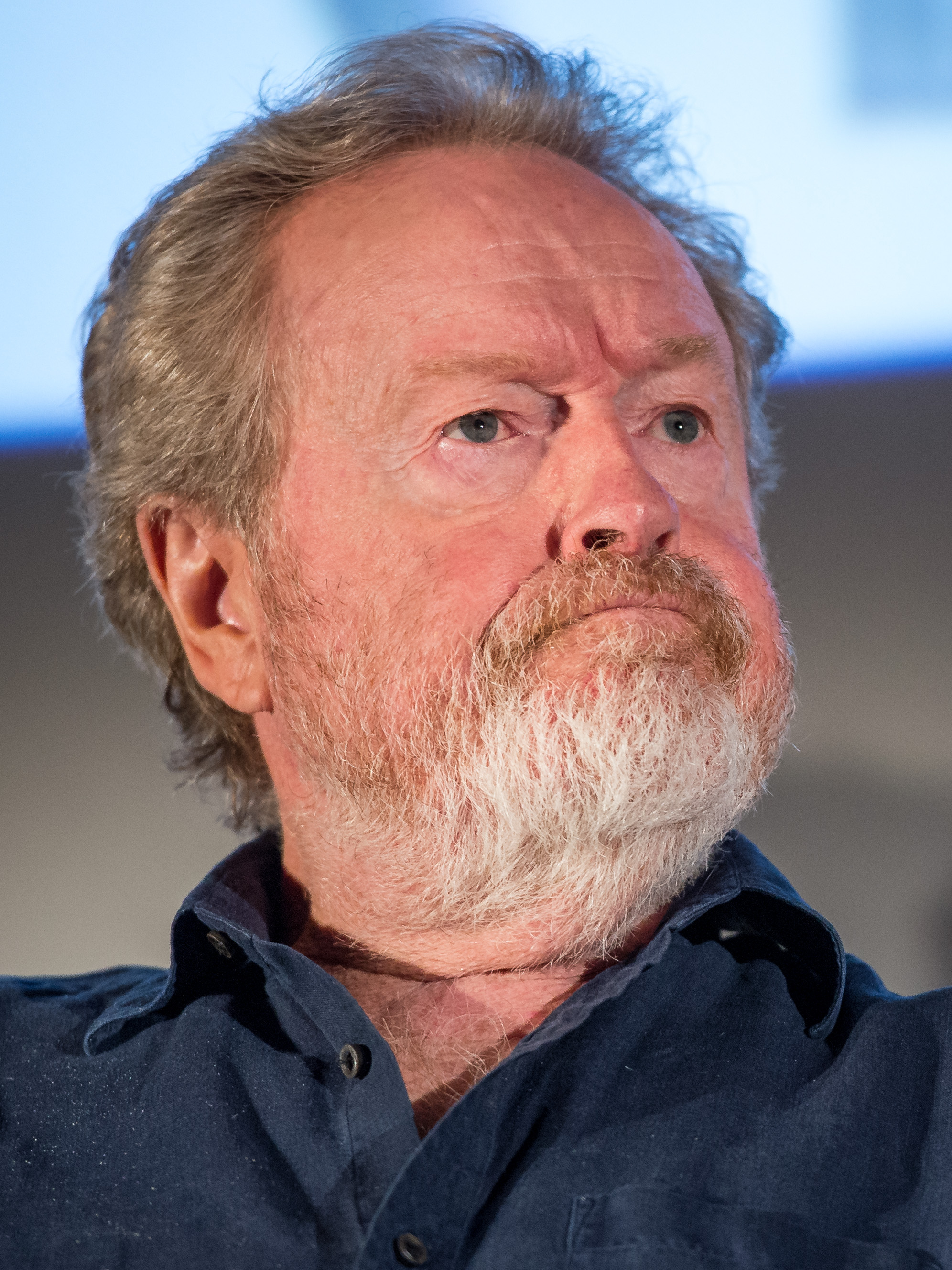
Director Scott in 2015

Development on a fifth film in the Alien franchise was in progress by 2002. Ridley Scott considered returning to the series he created with his 1979 science fiction horror film Alien, to pursue a sequel that would explore the engineered origins of the series' Alien creatures, and the "space jockey"—the extraterrestrial being, who briefly appears in Alien, as the deceased pilot of a derelict spaceship. Alien star Sigourney Weaver also expressed interest in returning to the series. Aliens director James Cameron discussed the potential for a sequel with Scott, and began working with another writer on a story for the film. It was then that 20th Century Fox approached Cameron with a script for a crossover film that would pit the series' monsters against the title characters of the Predator films; this project became the 2004 science fiction film Alien vs. Predator. After Fox confirmed that it would pursue the crossover, Cameron stopped working on his own project, believing the crossover would "kill the validity of the franchise." In 2006, Cameron confirmed that he would not return to the Alien sequel project, believing that the series was Fox's asset, and he was unwilling to deal with the studio's attempts to influence the potential sequel.

In May 2009, Fox said that the project was a "reboot" of the Alien franchise, and soon afterwards was reported as an untitled prequel to Alien. Development stopped in June 2009 when Fox clashed with Scott over his selection of former television advertisement director Carl Erik Rinsch as director. Fox was only interested in pursuing the project if Scott directed. By July 2009, Scott was contracted to direct the film, and screenwriter Jon Spaihts was hired to write the script based on his pitched idea for a direct Alien prequel. With the director and writer in place, and pleased with Spaihts' pitch, Fox scheduled a release date for December 2011, but this was eventually canceled. In June 2010, Scott announced that the script was complete and that pre-production would begin, and a filming date was set for January 2011. Fox eventually pushed to develop the project into an original work, and by July 2010, Lindelof had been hired to redevelop Spaihts' screenplay. In October 2010, Lindelof submitted his rewritten screenplay to Fox. Scott had initially requested a $250 million budget and an adult-oriented project, but Fox was reluctant to invest this amount of money, and wanted to ensure the film would receive a lower age-rating to broaden the potential audience.

In December 2010, it was reported that the film would be called Paradise, named after John Milton's poem Paradise Lost, but Scott considered that this would convey too much information about the film. Fox CEO Thomas Rothman suggested Prometheus, which was confirmed as the title in January 2011. A release date was scheduled for March 9, 2012, but weeks later the release was postponed until June 8, 2012. With the name confirmed, the production team began to publicly distance the film from its Alien origins, and were deliberately vague about the connection between the films, believing it would build audience anticipation for Prometheus. Scott stated that "while Alien was indeed the jumping-off point for this project, out of the creative process evolved a new, grand mythology and universe in which this original story takes place. The keen fan will recognize strands of Alien's DNA, so to speak, but the ideas tackled in this film are unique, large and provocative." In June 2011, Scott and Lindelof confirmed that Prometheus takes place in the same universe as the events of the Alien series. In July 2011, Scott stated that "by the end of the third act you start to realize there's a DNA of the very first Alien, but none of the subsequent [films]."

=== Writing ===
"It covers a vast expanse of time, past, present and future. It doesn't take place on Earth in any real significant way. The way we're exploring the future is away from Earth and [asking] what are people like now? What have they gone through and what are they thinking of? Space exploration in the future is going to evolve into this idea that it's not just about going out there and finding planets to build colonies. It also has this inherent idea that the further we go out, the more we learn about ourselves. The characters in this movie are preoccupied by the idea: what are our origins?"

— Damon Lindelof, concerning the scope of Prometheus.

Spaihts met Scott in late 2009 and they discussed Scott's desire to pursue an Alien prequel. Spaihts offered his concept, including a "bridge" that would connect the story of the film's human characters to the Alien saga. Spaihts was quickly hired, which he credited to the reception of his "bridge" idea. Spaihts claimed he created the concept spontaneously, without preconception. Spaihts wrote a 20-page "extremely detailed outline"; within three and a half weeks he had completed his first draft, and he submitted it to the producers on Christmas Day, 2009. Within 12 hours, Scott returned the script with notes for changes, and Spaihts spent the Christmas holiday redrafting.

Spaihts was tasked with exploring unresolved mysteries from Alien, such as the Space Jockey. He considered the mysteries of Alien to be alien in nature, and said, "all the mysteries have alien players: the exoskeleton nightmare and ... the elephantine titan that was called the 'space jockey' ... How do you make anyone care about events between creatures like this?" His solution was to link the alien mysteries to the past and future of humanity. He said: "If that story is somehow ours and deeply enmeshed with the human story, that story changes meaning within our life, things of such significance that we think of our own lives differently." Spaihts found translating Scott's stylistic visual concepts to text difficult, and he periodically constrained some of Scott's ideas. He reminded Scott that in the scene they were discussing, the characters were subject to gravity and so could not simply float. By April 2010, the script was on the fourth draft. Scott said about the script, "We are talking about gods and engineers. Engineers of space. And were the aliens designed as a form of biological warfare? Or biology that would go in and clean up a planet?"

In June 2010, Scott announced that the script was complete and ready for filming. However, Scott instead contacted Lindelof and asked him to review Spaihts' script. Within the hour, a messenger delivered the script to Lindelof and informed him that he would wait outside to return it as soon as Lindelof had finished reading it. Lindelof was unaware of what Scott and the producers liked about the existing script, and informed them that he found the general concept appealing, but that the story relied too heavily on elements of the Alien films, such as the Alien creatures' life-cycle. As a direct prequel to Alien, the story was shaped to lead into that film's story, and to recreate the familiar cues of that series, and Scott wanted to avoid repeating his previous accomplishments. Lindelof said, "If the ending to [Prometheus] is just going to be the room that John Hurt walks into that's full of [alien] eggs [in Alien], there's nothing interesting in that, because we know where it's going to end. Good stories, you don't know where they're going to end." Previously, Lindelof had stated that "A true prequel should essentially precede the events of the original film, but be about something entirely different, feature different characters, have an entirely different theme, although it takes place in that same world."

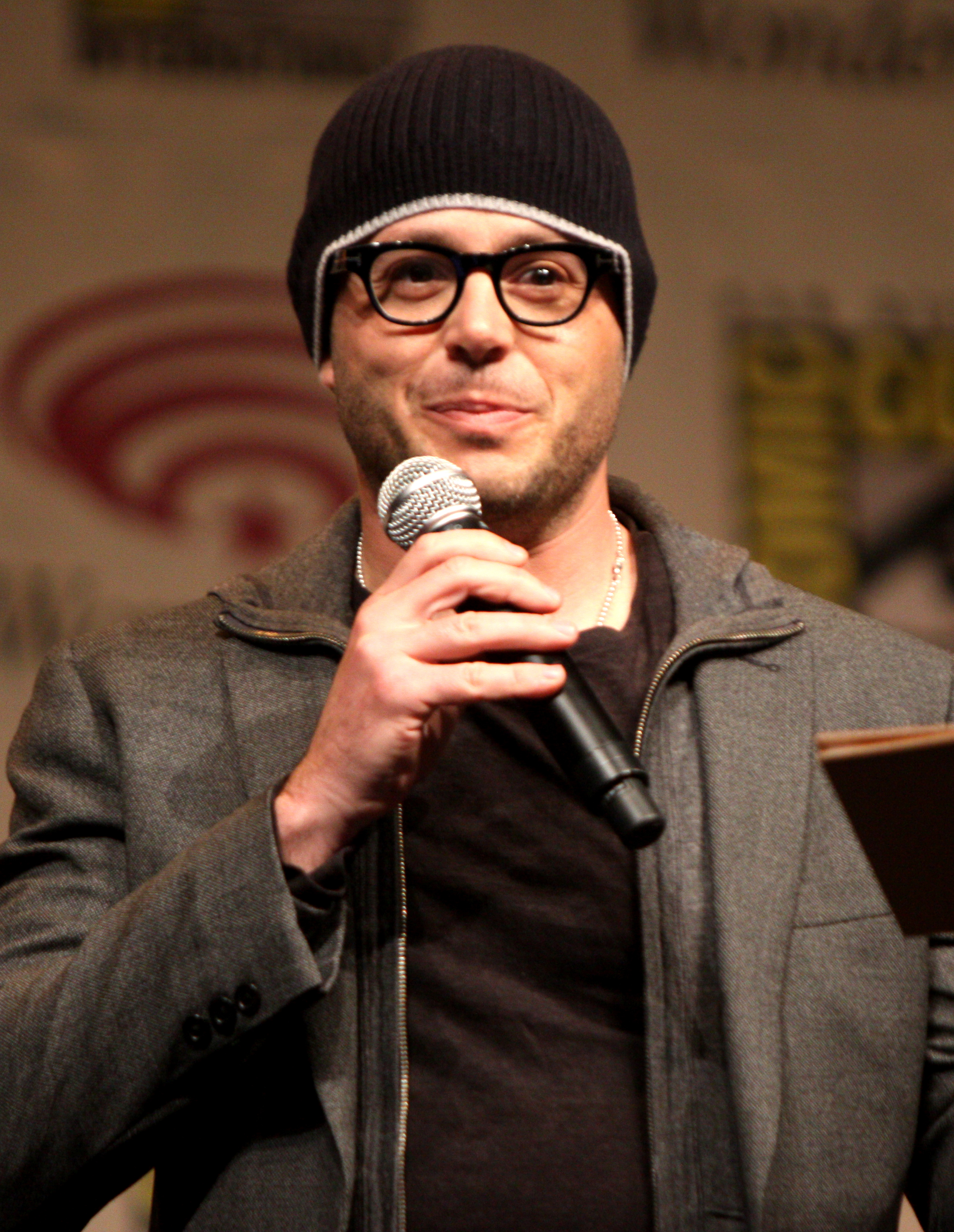
Writer Damon Lindelof promoting Prometheus at WonderCon in 2012. Lindelof was hired to rewrite Jon Spaihts's original script.

Lindelof said that the other parts of the script were strong enough to survive without the Alien hallmarks, such as the Alien creature, which he believed had been diluted by the exposure it had received. He said, "[The producers] were just looking for someone to say to them, Hey, we don't need the Alien stuff in here. It shouldn't be about that. It can be a part of this movie, but it shouldn't be what it's about." Lindelof said that the film could instead run parallel to the Alien series and that a sequel would be Prometheus 2 and not Alien, and submitted an idea for how such a sequel could work. Lindelof met with the producers the following morning, and was hired shortly afterward in late 2010. Under Lindelof, the script diverged from Spaihts' Alien prequel into an original creation. Scott and Lindelof worked together five days a week between July and August 2010 to construct the vision Scott wanted to convey and decide what script changes were needed, including scaling back the Alien symbolism and tropes. In August and September 2010, Lindelof spent almost five weeks writing his first draft, which he submitted in mid-September 2010. Inspired by Blade Runner and Spaihts' script, Lindelof thought that it would be possible to combine an Alien story of action and horror with "the Blade Runner thematic," to ask bigger questions than he felt were normally posed in science fiction films. Lindelof said,

Blade Runner might not have done well [financially] when it first came out, but people are still talking about it because it was infused with all these big ideas. [Scott] was also talking about very big themes in Prometheus. It was being driven by people who wanted the answers to huge questions. But I thought that we could do that without ever getting too pretentious. Nobody wants to see a movie where people are floating in space talking about the meaning of life ... That was already present in [Spaihts'] original script and [Scott] just wanted to bring it up more.

Scott's story concept was partially inspired by Chariots of the Gods?, Erich von Däniken's work about the theory of ancient astronauts which hypothesizes that life on Earth was created by aliens. Scott said, "NASA and the Vatican agree that [it is] almost mathematically impossible that we can be where we are today without there being a little help along the way ... That's what we're looking at [in the film], at some of Erich von Däniken's ideas of how did we humans come about." Spaihts originated the idea that David, the android, is like humans but does not want to be anything like them, eschewing a common theme in "robotic storytelling" such as in Blade Runner. He also developed the theme that while the human crew is searching for their creators, David is already among its creators. Scott liked these ideas and further explored them in Lindelof's rewrite. For Shaw, Lindelof felt it was important that she be distinct from Alien's Ripley, to avoid inevitable comparisons between the two characters. In Spaihts' draft, Shaw was directly responsible for the events of the plot because she wants to seek out potentially dangerous knowledge. As with David, Lindelof expanded this facet of the character during his rewrites. He spent approximately eight months developing the script, finishing in March 2011 as filming began.

=== Pre-production ===
Pre-production began in April 2010. A team developed graphic designs for the film. Scott convinced Fox to invest millions of dollars to hire scientists and conceptual artists to develop a vision of the late 21st century. The production of Prometheus was marked by a high degree of secrecy.

In July 2011, Lindelof said that the film would rely upon practical effects, and would use CGI generally for on-set pre-visualization of external space visuals. Scott said that "you can pretty much do anything you want" with digital technology, and, "Doug Trumbull once said to me 'If you can do it live, do it live.' That was 29 years ago. Even though we have remarkable digital capabilities, I still say do it live. It's cheaper." Cinematographer Dariusz Wolski convinced Scott that it would be possible to film in 3D with the same ease and efficiency of 2D filming. 3D company 3ality Technica provided some of the rigs and equipment to facilitate 3D filming, and trained the film's crew in their proper operation. According to Scott, the decision to film in 3D added $10 million to the film's budget. Since 3D films need high lighting levels on set, the hallmark dark and shadowy atmosphere of the Alien films was added in post-production using color grading processes, and the 3D equipment was based on post-Avatar technology.

=== Filming ===
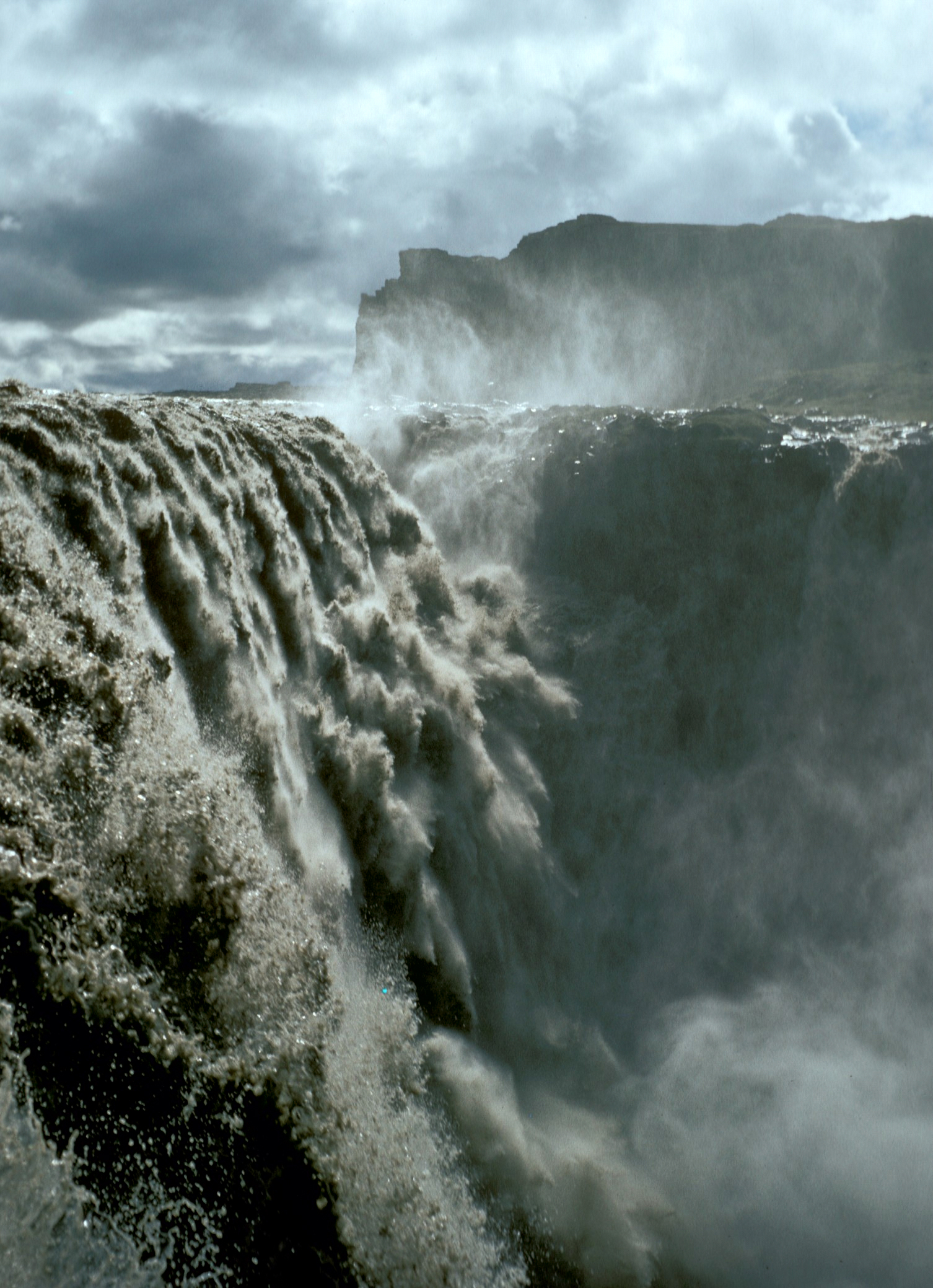
The Dettifoss waterfall in Iceland was used in the film's opening scene showing an Engineer creating life.

With an estimated $120–130 million budget, principal photography began on March 21, 2011, and lasted 82 days. Filming began at Shepperton Studios and Pinewood Studios in England. Scott used eight sound stages for filming, including the 007 Stage. Studio space was limited and the crew had to make five stages work for approximately 16 sets, and increased the size of the 007 Stage by over 30%.

Exterior shots of the alien world were shot in Iceland, where filming took two weeks. It commenced on July 11, 2011, at the base of Hekla, an active volcano in southern Iceland. Speaking about working at the volcano, Scott said, "If one is afraid of nature in this profession then it would be best to find a different job." Filming also took place at Dettifoss, one of the most powerful waterfalls in Europe. The Iceland shoot involved 160 Icelandic crew members and over 200 imported crew. Scott said that the filming in Iceland comprised approximately fifteen minutes of footage for the film, and that the area represented the beginning of time. Morocco had been chosen as a location for these scenes, but the 2010 Arab Spring protests forced the change of venue. Alternatives including the Mojave Desert had been considered, but Scott explained that Iceland was ultimately chosen because "here it is so rough and 'Jurassic-like' and that proved decisive."

In September 2011, filming moved to the Ciudad de la Luz audiovisual complex in Alicante, Spain. Shooting areas included the complex's large water tank, and a nearby beach. The complex was booked from August 22, 2011, through to December 10, 2011, and set construction occurred from August until late September. Approximately 250 people worked on the three-month-long Spain shoot, generating over €1 million in the local economy. Filming also took place in the Wadi Rum valley in Jordan.

Scott avoided using green screens unless necessary. Instead, he used various items so the actors would know where they should be looking in any particular scene on the practical sets where CGI elements would be inserted in post-production. Rapace said that green screens were used fewer than six times during filming. The production used five 3ality Technical Atom 3D rigs, four of which were configured with Red Epic 3D cameras set on camera dollies and tripods, which were continuously in use during filming. The fifth rig used an Epic camera as a steadicam, which was used only occasionally.

=== Post-production ===
Scott used the 3D footage to increase the illusion of depth. Despite this being his first 3D film he found the process easy. He said, "You can literally twiddle a knob and the depth will increase," and "the trick is not to overdo it." In December 2011, Rapace undertook additional dialogue recordings for the film. Additional pick-up scenes were filmed during January 2012, including a one-day shoot on the Isle of Skye, Scotland, and a new scene shot at a cave in the Scottish mountains. For dark scenes, the film was color graded to specifically compensate for the light loss of 3D glasses, to ensure the image was comparable to the 2D version.

In July 2011, Scott said that he was filming Prometheus with both adult-oriented R and more accessible PG-13 film ratings in mind, allowing the more adult content to be cut if necessary without harming the overall presentation. Scott said he had a responsibility to 20th Century Fox to be able to present a PG-13 cut of the film if the studio demanded, allowing it to be viewed by a wider potential audience. When asked about the rating, Scott said, "The question is, do you go for the PG-13, or do you go for what it should be, which is R? Financially it makes quite a difference ... essentially it's kinda R ... it's not just about blood, it's about ideas that are very stressful." Scott also said that, regardless of rating, he would present the most aggressive cut of the film he could, while Rothman said that Scott would not be forced to compromise the film's quality to avoid an R-rating. On May 7, 2012, Fox confirmed that the film had received an R-rating and would be released without any cuts being made. According to Scott, the scene of Shaw surgically removing her alien offspring was the significant cause of the restrictive rating, and it was suggested that removing the scene entirely would be the only way to gain a lower one. A fight scene between Shaw and the Engineer was shortened because Scott decided that Shaw directly wounding the Engineer diminished his role. Scott concluded work on the film in March 2012.

=== Music ===
Marc Streitenfeld, who had worked with Scott on earlier projects, composed the musical score for Prometheus. It took just over a week to record with a 90-piece orchestra at Abbey Road Studios in London, England. Streitenfeld began writing ideas for the score after reading the script before filming commenced. He used some unusual techniques to compose the score, and said, "I actually wrote out the sheet music backwards so the orchestra played it backwards and then I digitally flipped it. So you're hearing the score as it's written, the same melody, but with a backwards sounding orchestra which gives it a kind of unusual, unsettling sound." The Prometheus (Original Motion Picture Soundtrack) album was released on iTunes on May 15, 2012, and on CD on June 4, 2012. It features 23 tracks by Streitenfeld and two supplemental tracks by Harry Gregson-Williams. Frédéric Chopin's "Raindrop prelude" (1838) is also featured in the film.

== Design ==
Production designer Arthur Max led the film's design staff. His art team were tasked with deconstructing the art and visuals of Alien, and reverse-designing them for the chronologically earlier setting of Prometheus. Influence was drawn from the work of Alien creature designer H. R. Giger, and designers Ron Cobb and Chris Foss, including their designs for that film which Scott had been unable to develop at the time.

=== Costume design ===
For the crew's space suits, Scott was inspired to include spherical glass helmets after reading a story in Steve Jobs' biography about building an office out of Gorilla Glass. Scott said, "If I'm in 2083 and I'm going into space, why would I design a helmet that has blind spots. What I want is something where I have 360 [vision]. Glass, by then, will be light and you won't be able to break it with a bullet." The interior of the prop helmets had nine functioning video screens, internal lighting, an air supply provided by two fans, and battery packs concealed within a backpack. The helmet's exterior featured a functional light source and high definition video cameras with a transmitter and recorder. For the suit itself, Scott wanted to avoid the unwieldy NASA-style suit. His frequent collaborator, Janty Yates, used medical research concepts relating to skin replacement treatments and materials to develop a garment that would be believable, flexible and comfortable. The outfit comprised a neoprene suit worn under an outer space suit, a base to which the helmet could be attached, and a backpack.

Aboard the ship, Yates gave the characters their own distinct looks. Theron is dressed in an ice-silver, silk mohair suit. Yates said, "[Theron] is the ice queen. It was always our vision to make her look as sculptural as possible." Fassbender's David is dressed similarly to other crew members, but his outfit was given finer lines to produce a more linear appearance. To create a casual, relaxed appearance, Marshall-Green's Holloway was dressed in hoodies, fisherman pants, and flip-flops, while Elba wore a canvas-greased jacket to represent his long career at the helm of a ship.

=== Sets and vehicles ===
Arthur Max designed the sets such as the alien world landscape and structures, and the vehicles, including the Prometheus and the Engineer's ship. Digital 3D models and miniature replicas of each set were built to allow the designers to envisage the connections between them and to know where the CGI elements would be inserted. To better blend the practical and the digital, the design team took rock samples from the Iceland location so they could match the graphical textures with the real rocks. To create the Prometheus, Max researched NASA and European Space Agency spacecraft designs, and extended these concepts with his own ideas of how future space vehicles might look. He said that he wanted "to do something that was state-of-the-art, which would represent a flagship spacecraft with every technology required to probe into the deepest corners of the galaxy."

The interior of the Prometheus was built across a two-level structure, fronted by a large, faceted, wrap around windscreen. Theron's quarters were designed to represent her high status in the crew, and were furnished with modern and futuristic items, including Swarovski chandeliers and a Fazioli piano. The ship's garage was built on the backlot of Pinewood Studios in England. The vehicles inside were built in 11 weeks and were designed to operate on difficult terrain while having a futuristic aesthetic. Max created a large pyramid structure for the alien world, which had its main interior areas connected by a series of chambers, corridors, and tunnels; it was so large that some members of the film crew became lost inside it. The pyramid was enhanced in post-production to further increase its size. One of the key sets, the chamber where the crew find the humanoid-head statue, was designed to resemble the interior of a cathedral and convey a quasi-religious impression. Giger designed the murals that appear within the chamber.

For the scene of the Prometheus' descent to the alien moon LV-223, visual effects art director Steven Messing referenced NASA imagery, including vortex cloud structures. He also used aerial photographs of locations in Iceland and Wadi Rum shot by VFX supervisor Richard Stammers and his team. Messing painted over these images and combined them with 3D set extensions to create a realistic altered landscape. Scott wanted the ship's descent scenes to have a sense of grandeur to contrast the dark and shrouded descent featured in Alien. Much of LV-223s world was based upon the world visited in Alien, but scaled back as Scott felt some elements were too unrealistic. Other influences were the Martian mountain Olympus Mons and several large mountain structures on Earth. NASA advisers provided concepts for the aesthetics of alien worlds which were incorporated into the design work. MPC developed a digital representation of Wadi Rum using the design material, modified it to locate the alien pyramid and a landing area for the Prometheus, and resized the planet's natural features relative to the alien structures.

=== Creature effects ===
The practical model for the Adult Trilobite, featuring multiple long tentacle-like appendages and a mouth in the centre of its body

Neal Scanlan and Conor O'Sullivan developed the film's alien creatures, aiming to convey that each creature has a logical biological function and purpose. Scanlan said that much of Scott's inspiration for creature design is drawn from natural life, such as plants and sea creatures. Creature designer Carlos Huante chose to make the creature designs pale to contrast the black-toned, Giger-influenced aesthetic of Alien. Huante designed them to be white and embryonic because the events in the film occur before Giger's influence had taken effect. Huante took influences from references Scott was using to design the pale-skinned Engineers. Huante also referenced other Giger works, national monuments, large sculptures, and the Crazy Horse Memorial statue in South Dakota. Part of Huante's early design work included developing precursors to Alien's Facehugger, and a primitive Alien creature, but these were cut from the final release. When designing the Engineers, Scott and Huante referenced paintings by William Blake and J. M. W. Turner, and classical sculptures. Scott wanted the Engineers to resemble Greco-Roman gods, and instructed designer Neville Page to reference the Statue of Liberty, Michelangelo's David, and Elvis Presley. The 8-foot tall, humanoid Engineers were created by applying bulky, full-body prosthetics to the actors, whose facial features were diminished by the material, and were later digitally enhanced to preserve the "godlike" physical perfection. Scott described the Engineers as tall, elegant "dark angels."

The snake-like alien dubbed the "Hammerpede" was given life through a mixture of CGI and practical effects, and the wires controlling the practical puppet were digitally removed. For a scene in which the Hammerpede is decapitated, the VFX team digitally animated and inserted the spontaneous growth of a replacement head. During the scene in which the Hammerpede erupts from Spall's character's corpse, Scott controlled the puppet using wires. Scott did not inform Dickie about what was to occur in the scene and her screaming reaction was real. The creature's design was partially inspired by translucent sea creatures with visible arteries, veins, and organs beneath the skin's surface, and cobras. The designers gave the creature a smooth, muscular, and powerful appearance. Early designs of the "Trilobite," the tentacled offspring cut from Shaw, resembled an octopus or squid. Page redeveloped this creature as an embryo in an early state of development, with tentacles that began fused together and would gradually split, creating new tentacles, as the creature developed. The practical creature was a remotely operated animatronic creation with a silicone skin.

The mutated Fifield effects were achieved mainly through the use of make-up and prosthetics. Due to concerns that the practical effects would be unsatisfactory, the filmmakers completed an alternative version of the sequence, in which Fifield was rendered as "a digital character with elongated limbs and an engorged, translucent head, incorporating a semblance of Harris's face." Three other variations of the mutated Fifield were modeled, but these were rejected as being too inhuman.

For its grown form, the "Adult Trilobite," Max found inspiration from an arthropod-like creature from Earth's Cambrian period, and the alien octopus in Jean Giraud's illustrations for the comic strip The Long Tomorrow. Further inspiration came after Max found a formaldehyde-preserved giant squid, an image which met with Scott's approval. The film's last-unveiled creature, the "Deacon," was named by Scott for its long, pointed head that he considered resembled a bishop's mitre. Scanlan aimed to represent the creature's genetic lineage, beginning with Shaw and Holloway who produce the Trilobite which impregnates the Engineer, in its design. However, the creature was given a somewhat feminine appearance, since "it was born of a female before being born of a male." Messing drew inspiration for the Deacon's birth scene from the birth of foals, and created an iridescent appearance for its skin, based on the equine placenta. The Deacon's protruding jaw was inspired by the goblin shark.

=== Sound effects ===
Sound effects were generated with a variety of sources including Pop Rocks—a brand of popping candy—and a parrot. The glistening ice forming on the stone cylinders discovered in the film was created by applying the popping candy to materials such as wet metal and stone that was then sprayed with water to produce the "popping, cracking" sound. Sound designer Ann Scibelli's parrot was recorded over several weeks to document her variety of vocalizations which were then used as beeps, alarms and the cries of Shaw's alien offspring.

=== Visual effects ===
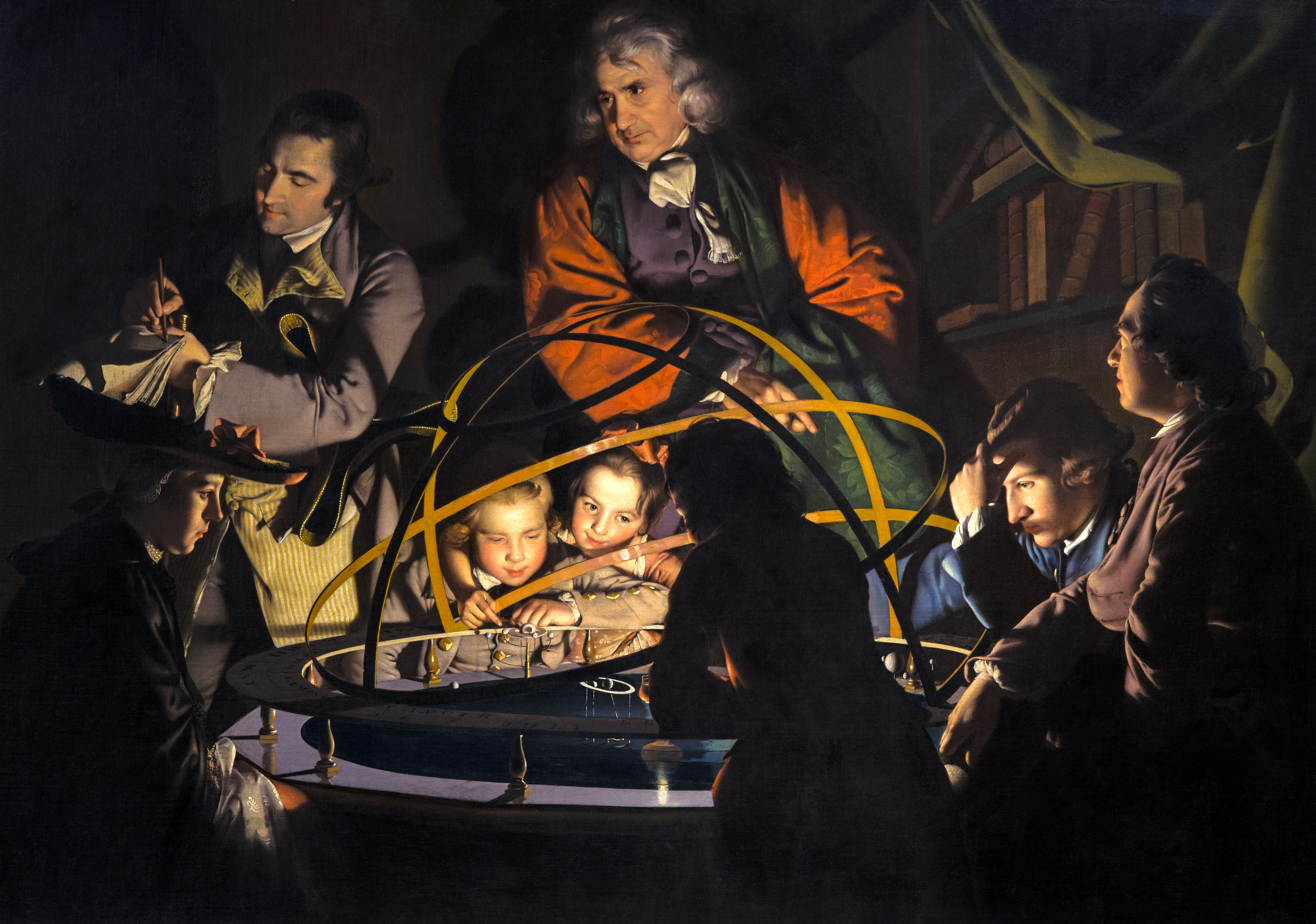
The film's star map sequence was inspired by Joseph Wright's painting A Philosopher Lecturing on the Orrery.

Prometheus contains approximately 1,300 digital effect shots. The main effects studio was Moving Picture Company (MPC), which produced 420 of the shots. Several other studios, including Weta Digital, Fuel VFX, Rising Sun Pictures, Luma Pictures, Lola Visual Effects, and Hammerhead Productions, also produced effects shots for the film.

The creation of life from the disintegration of an Engineer in the film's opening scene was created by WETA Digital. The scene was difficult to produce because it had to convey the story of the Engineer's DNA breaking apart, reforming and recombining into Earth DNA in a limited span of time. The team focused on making the DNA stages distinct to convey its changing nature. Scott requested the studio to focus on the destruction occurring within the Engineer. A light color scheme was used for the Engineer's DNA and decayed fish spines were used as an image reference, while the infected DNA had a melted appearance. To find methods of depicting the DNA destruction, the team carved vein-like structures from silicone and pumped black ink and oils into them while filming the changes occurring over an extended period of time.

A key scene involving a large 3D hologram star map, dubbed the Orrery, was inspired by the 1766 Joseph Wright painting A Philosopher Lecturing on the Orrery, in which a scientist displays a mechanical planetarium by candlelight. While discussing the necessity of a star map with Spaihts, Scott mentioned that he envisaged a physical representation being similar to the painting, although he was unaware of its title and described it as "circles in circles with a candle lit image." Using Scott's description, Spaihts located an image of the painting. Spaihts said, "making the leap from a star map, to an Enlightenment painting, and then back into the far future. [Scott's] mind just multiplexes in that way." The Orrery was one of the most complex visual effects, contained 80–100 million polygons, and took several weeks to render as a single, complete shot.

== Marketing ==
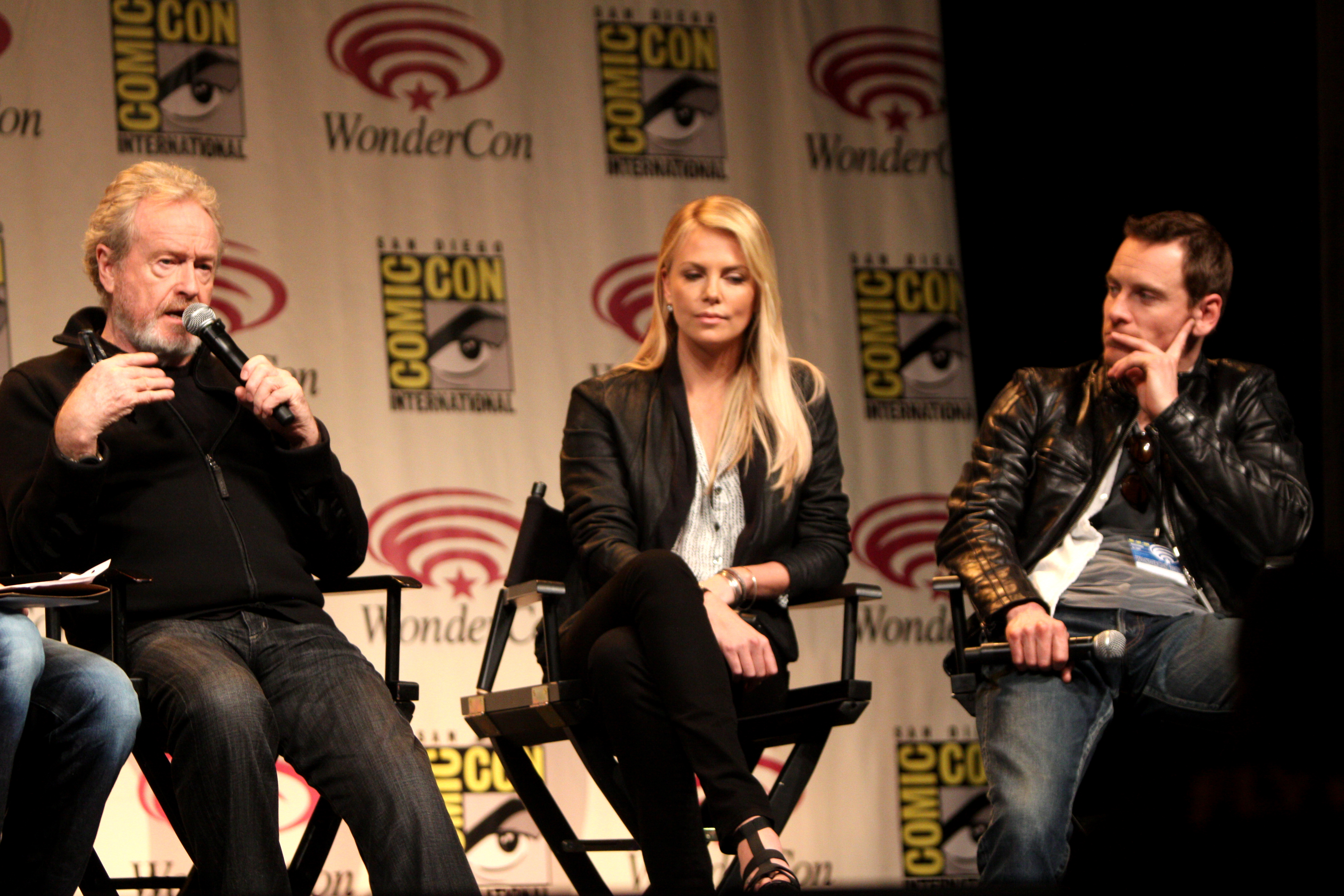
Ridley Scott, Charlize Theron, and Michael Fassbender promoting the film at WonderCon in March 2012

Prometheus' marketing campaign began on July 21, 2011, at San Diego Comic-Con, where images and footage from the film were presented by Lindelof and Theron; Scott and Rapace participated via satellite contribution. A segment of the footage showed Theron performing "naked" push-ups, which attracted much attention. A teaser poster was released on December 14, 2011, with the tagline, "The search for our beginning could lead to our end." A bootleg recording of an incomplete trailer was leaked online on November 27, 2011, but was quickly taken down by Fox. The trailer was released on December 22, 2011.

On March 17, 2012, Scott, in partnership with AMC Theatres, hosted the premiere of the first full Prometheus trailer at the AMC Downtown Disney during WonderCon in Anaheim, California. The event was streamed live via Facebook, Twitter, and the AMC Theatre website, and the trailer was posted on AMC's YouTube channel immediately after its debut. Reactions to the trailer from WonderCon attendees, and on Twitter, were generally positive, and it received nearly three million views in the three days following its release. On April 10, 2012, media outlets were shown a 13-minute montage of scenes in 3D from the film's opening at the Vue Cinema in Leicester Square, London. The screening, and in particular the 3D visuals and the performances of Fassbender, Rapace, Theron, and Elba, was well received.

On April 29, 2012, the international launch trailer debuted in the United Kingdom on Channel 4 during the first advertisement break of the TV show Homeland. Viewers were encouraged to share their opinions about the trailer on Twitter, some of which were then shared in a live broadcast during a later break. This was the first time that viewers' tweets were used in a broadcast advertisement. A competition, offering viewers a chance to win tickets to the film whenever the social platform Zeebox detected the advertisement airing, was launched on that site. On May 8, 2012, the advertisement became the subject of an investigation by the British broadcasting regulatory body Ofcom for allegedly breaching broadcast rules when a voiceover encouraged viewers to book tickets during the advertisement with the Channel 4 logo onscreen. The broadcast potentially broke a ruling that advertising and teleshopping must be clearly distinguishable from editorial content.

Although marketers typically avoid promoting adult-oriented films to reach a broader demographic, the film attracted several promotional partners including Coors, Amazon, and Verizon FiOS, which were estimated to have spent $30 million in marketing support. Amazon directed interested users to purchase tickets through Fandango, and placed promotional material in products shipped to customers; this was the first time that Amazon had allowed such marketing by an external company. The premiere in London was streamed live via the film's website and the Verizon FiOS Facebook page. The event was facilitated by BumeBox, which took audience questions from social sites and gave them to reporters to ask at the event. The National Entertainment Collectibles Association (NECA) released a series of Prometheus action figures in September 2012. A book, Prometheus: The Art of the Film, containing production art and behind-the-scenes photographs, was released on June 12, 2012.

=== Viral campaign ===
An advertisement for "David" printed in newspapers. The advert highlights the viral website campaign and the film's marketing partnership with Verizon.

A viral marketing campaign began on February 28, 2012, with the release of a video featuring a speech by Pearce, in character as Peter Weyland, about his vision for the future. Set in 2023, the TED 2023 short film presents a futuristic vision of a TED conference, an annual technology and design event held in Long Beach, California. The segment was conceived and designed by Scott and Lindelof, and directed by Scott's son, Luke. The production was made in collaboration with, and made available through TED because Lindelof wanted to introduce new audiences to the conference itself. Lindelof said that the scene takes place in a futuristic stadium because "a guy like Peter Weyland—whose ego is just massive, and the ideas that he's advancing are nothing short of hubris—that he'd basically say to TED, 'If you want me to give a talk, I'm giving it in Wembley Stadium.'"

TED community director Tom Rielly helped the film's producers gain approval for the use of the TED brand, which had not previously been used for promotional purposes. Rielly was involved in designing the 2023 conference, and said that the association generated millions of unique visits to the TED website. The video's release was accompanied by a fictional TED blog about the 2023 conference and a tie-in website for the fictional Weyland Corporation. On March 6, 2012, the Weyland website was updated to allow visitors to invest in the company as part of a game, which would reveal new Prometheus media.

During the 2012 WonderCon, attendees at the film's panel were given Weyland Corporation business cards that directed them to a website and telephone number. After calling the number, the caller was sent a text message from Weyland Corporation that linked them to a video that was presented as an advertisement for the "David 8" android, narrated by Fassbender. An extended version of the video, released on April 17, 2012, lists the android's features, including its ability to seamlessly replicate human emotions without the restrictions of ethics or distress. A full page "David 8" advertisement was placed in The Wall Street Journal; a Twitter account operated by a David8, that allowed Twitter users to ask the character questions, was included. A partnership with Verizon FiOS was launched, offering a virtual tour of the Prometheus spaceship. Another short film, Quiet Eye, starring Rapace as Shaw, was released on May 16, 2012, and debuted on the Verizon FIOS Facebook page. In a telephone call monitored by Yutani, a fictional company from the Alien series, Shaw requests Weyland's aid to seek out alien life. In France, the Saint-Martin ghost train station was converted to resemble alien architecture from the film, and was visible to passing commuters. The campaign continued after the film's release with a website that was listed during the film's end credits. The site referenced the philosophical novel Thus Spoke Zarathustra by Friedrich Nietzsche, and featured a video of Weyland, who quotes from the book. Another video followed in September 2012, featuring Elba's Captain Janek preparing for a mission.

At the May 2012 Digital Hollywood conference, Lindelof said that the videos originated from the question of the film's status as an Alien prequel. It was decided that creating videos with the film's stars would generate more interest than any commentary about its connection to the Alien films. He also said that the videos needed to be cool enough to justify their existence, but not so important that their absence from the final film would be an issue for audiences.

== Release ==
The premiere of Prometheus took place on May 31, 2012, at the Empire cinema in Leicester Square, London. The film was released in the United Kingdom on June 1, 2012, and in North America on June 8, 2012. It was simultaneously released in IMAX theaters and in 3D, and it is encoded for D-Box motion seats that provide physical feedback to the audience during the film.

=== Pre-release ===
In the United Kingdom, approximately £1 million ($1.6 million) of tickets were pre-sold. 18,827 tickets pre-sold for the London IMAX, the largest IMAX screen in the country, which broke the theater records for the highest grossing week of pre-sales with £293,312 ($474,687), and the highest grossing first day of pre-sales with £137,000 ($221,717). It extended this record to 30,000 tickets sold and £470,977 ($737,588) earned, and become the most pre-booked film at that theater, exceeding the performance of high-profile IMAX releases including Harry Potter and the Deathly Hallows – Part 2 and Avatar.

In North America, audience tracking showed high interest among males, but low among females. In the week before the film's release, predictions were conflicted on whether Prometheus or Madagascar 3: Europe's Most Wanted (the first family-oriented film of the summer), which were released simultaneously, would reach number 1 for that weekend. On June 6, 2012, Fandango reported that with 42% of daily sales, Prometheus was beating Madagascar 3. The online tracking for Prometheus surged with each additional promotional footage. Prometheus was predicted to earn approximately $30 million, and Madagascar 3 around $45 million. As the weekend approached, tracking suggested a $55 million debut for Madagascar 3 and $50–$55 million for Prometheus. Prometheus was disadvantaged by Madagascar opening in 264 more theaters, and by its own adult rating.

=== Box office ===
Prometheus was considered a financial success overall. After a strong start in North America, the film failed to meet the studio's expectations, but it continued to perform strongly in other territories until the end of its theatrical run. Prometheus earned $126.4 million (31.4%) in North America and $276.9 million (68.6%) elsewhere for a worldwide total of $403.4 million, making it the 18th highest-grossing film of 2012, and at its peak it was the 155th highest-grossing film worldwide unadjusted for inflation. The film made $31.8 million from global IMAX, making it the highest-grossing horror film in the said format.

Prometheus was released in 15 markets between May 30 and June 1, 2012—about a week before its North American release. The earlier start in these countries was timed to avoid competition with the start of the 2012 UEFA European Football Championship the following week. On its opening day, which varies depending on the country, it earned $3.39 million in the United Kingdom, $2.2 million in Russia, and $1.5 million in France. The film earned $34.8 million during its opening weekend from 4,695 theaters in 15 markets, and debuted at number 1 in 14 of them, with an average of $7,461 per theater. Its overall rank for the weekend was third behind Men in Black 3 and Snow White & the Huntsman. Its opening weekends in the United Kingdom, Ireland and Malta ($10.1 million), Russia and the CIS ($9.80 million), and France and the Maghreb region ($6.68 million) represented its largest takings. By June 8, the film had opened in a total of 50 markets, and was also successful during its opening weekends in Australia ($7.2 million) and South Korea ($4.2 million). During its late August opening in Japan, the film earned $9.6 million.

In North America, Prometheus earned $3.561 million in midnight showings at 1,368 theaters, including $1.03 million from 294 IMAX theaters, and went on to earn $21.4 million through its opening day. During its opening weekend, the film earned $51.05 million from 3,396 theaters—an average of $15,032 per theater—ranking second behind Madagascar 3 ($60.4 million), which made it the second largest opening for a film directed by Scott behind his 2001 thriller Hannibal, the third largest second-place opening, the ninth largest opening for a prequel, and the tenth largest for an R-rated film. The largest demographic of the opening weekend audience was over the age of 25 (64%) and male (57%). 3D showings accounted for 54% of ticket sales, while IMAX contributed 18%—the majority of which was accounted for in the 3D figure. The film closed on September 20, 2012, after 105 days (15 weeks) in release with a total gross of $126.4 million. The figure made it the number 43 highest-grossing film to never finish a week as the number 1 film.

=== Home media ===
In North America, Prometheus DVD and Blu-ray disc releases were listed for pre-order in partnership with Amazon on June 1, 2012, a week before the film was released in theaters. A limited number of cinema tickets for the film were offered as a pre-order incentive. In June 2012, FX obtained the rights to the film's network television premiere. On September 7, 2012, Fox announced that Prometheus would be the launch title of its new digital distribution initiative "Digital HD." The film was released on September 18, 2012, three weeks prior to its DVD, Blu-ray disc and Video on demand (VOD) release, for downloading and streaming through platforms including Amazon, iTunes, PlayStation Network and Xbox Live in over 50 countries. The film was released on Blu-ray disc and DVD on October 9, 2012. The Blu-ray disc edition of the film was released in a 2-disc set and a 4-disc "Collector's Edition." Both versions contain the theatrical cut of Prometheus, commentary by Scott, Lindelof and Spaihts, a DVD and digital copy of the film, alternate and deleted scenes, and other features. Additionally, the Collector's Edition contains the 3D version of the film and approximately 7 hours of supplemental features including a documentary on the film's production. On October 8, 2012, it was reported that Fox had requested an extended version of the film for home media, but Scott refused to edit cut scenes back into the theatrical version of the film, which he considered his director's cut. During its first week of sale in the United Kingdom, Prometheus was the number 1 selling film on DVD and Blu-ray Disc, outselling its nearest competitor by a factor of three. An Ultra HD Blu-ray version was released in September 2017.

== Reception ==
=== Critical reception ===
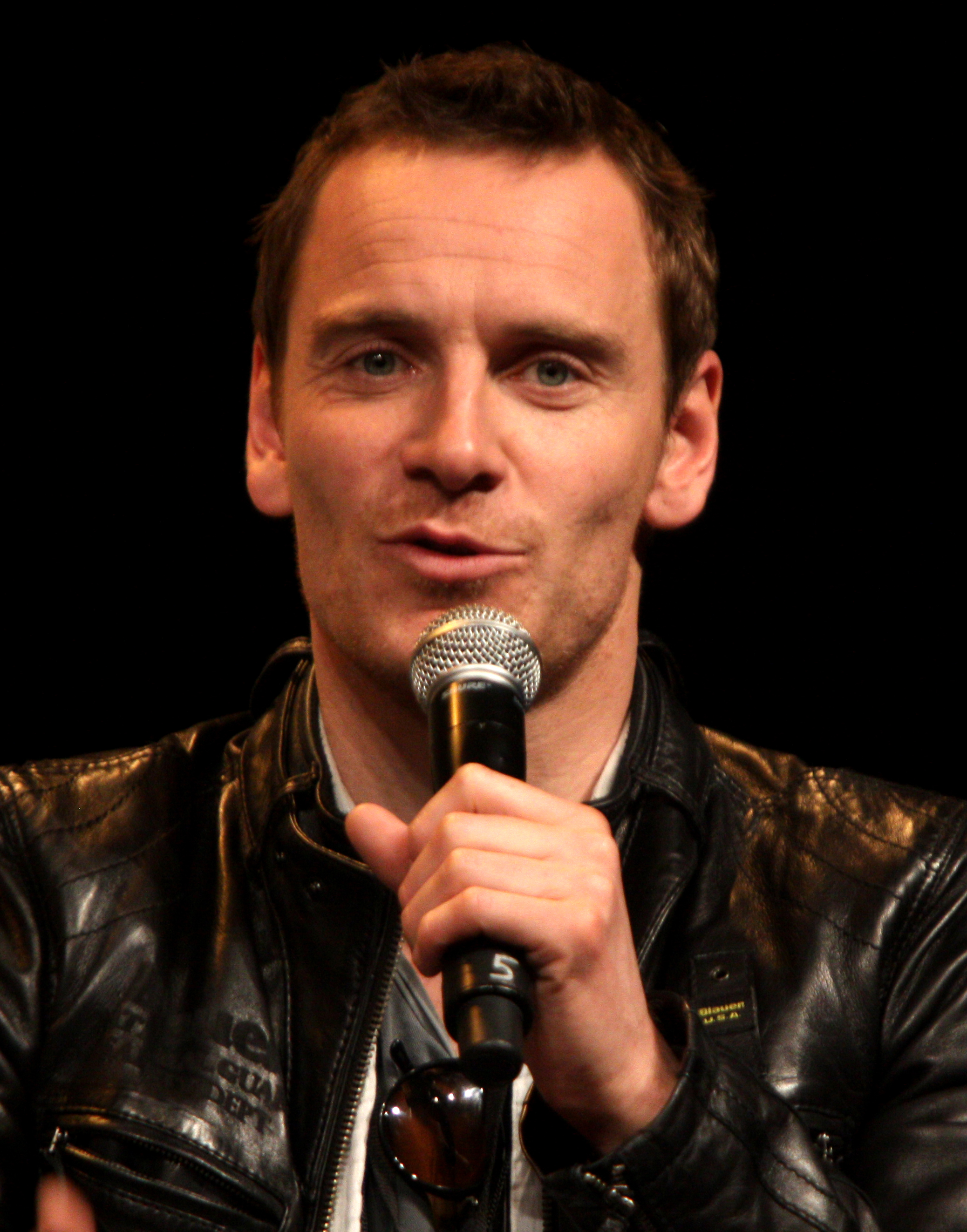
Fassbender in 2012. Critics praised his portrayal of the android David.

Prometheus has a 73% approval rating from 312 critics with an average rating of 7/10 on the review-aggregation website Rotten Tomatoes, which says, "Ridley Scott's ambitious quasi-prequel to Alien may not answer all of its big questions, but it's redeemed by its haunting visual grandeur and compelling performances—particularly Michael Fassbender as a fastidious android." Metacritic provides a score of 64 out of 100 from 43 critics, which indicates "generally favorable" reviews. CinemaScore polls reported that the average grade moviegoers gave the film was a "B" on a scale of A+ to F, while audience members under 25 rated it the highest at A−. Reviews frequently praised both the film's visual aesthetic, design, and Fassbender's performance as the android David. The plot drew a mixed response from critics, who criticized plot elements that remained unresolved or were predictable, tempered by appreciation for the action and horror set-pieces.

The Hollywood Reporter's Todd McCarthy called the film's visuals vivid, stunning, and magnificent on a technical level, and praised the performances of Fassbender, Rapace, and Theron, but wrote that the film "caters too much to imagined audience expectations when a little more adventurous thought might have taken it to some excitingly unsuspected destinations." Time Out London's Tom Huddleston wrote that "the photography is pleasingly crisp and the design is stunning," but that, "[t]he script feels flat ... the dialogue is lazy, while the plot, though crammed with striking concepts, simply fails to coalesce. After an enjoyable setup, the central act is baggy, confusing and, in places, slightly boring, while the climax has flash and fireworks but no real momentum." Emanuel Levy wrote that the writing was his only complaint about the film, which, he said, "is not only uneven, but promises more original ideas and thematic provocations than it can possibly deliver."

Roger Ebert gave the film four out of four stars, labeling it a "seamless blend of story, special effects and pitch-perfect casting, filmed in sane, effective 3-D that doesn't distract." Ebert wrote that Rapace's performance "continues here the tradition of awesome feminine strength begun by Sigourney Weaver in Alien," but considered that Elba's Janek has the most interesting character evolution. Ebert thought that the plot raises questions and does not answer them, which made the film intriguing and parallel to the "classic tradition of golden age sci-fi." He later went on to name it as one of the best films of 2012.

Total Film's Jonathan Crocker wrote that the plot successfully integrated itself with Alien's mythology while offering its own original ideas. Entertainment Weekly's Lisa Schwarzbaum was positive towards the cast, particularly Rapace, and the cinematography. Salon's Andrew O'Hehir wrote that the film was "somber, spectacular and ponderous," but that the "portentousness and grandiosity ... is at once the film's great strength and great weakness" and criticized the characters for lacking common sense. O'Hehir also mentioned Wolski's cinematography and Max's production design. The New York Times' A. O. Scott criticized the story as weak, and argued that the narrative's twists and reversals undermine its "lofty, mindblowing potential." He said the film has no revelations, just "bits of momentarily surprising information bereft of meaning or resonance," and that Rapace is a "fine heroine, vulnerable and determined."

Variety film critic Justin Chang wrote that the film's narrative structure was unable to handle the philosophical dimension of the plot, and that Prometheus was lazily deferring key plot points under the presumption that a sequel would be made. The Guardian's Peter Bradshaw wrote that Prometheus was "more grandiose, more elaborate—but less interesting" than Alien, and lacked the latter's "central killer punch." Ian Nathan of Empire magazine was unimpressed by Rapace—whom he described as an unconvincing lead—and said that with "a lack of suspense, threadbare characters, and a very poor script, the stunning visuals, gloopy madness, and sterling Fassbenderiness can't prevent Prometheus feeling like Alien's poor relation." The Village Voice's Nick Pinkerton wrote that the film is "prone to shallow ponderousness," and that Scott "can still mimic the appearance of an epic, noble, important movie—but the appearance is all." He criticized Rapace and Marshall-Green for failing to instill interest in their characters' relationship, but added: "There are a few set pieces here that will find a place of honor among aficionados of body horror and all things clammy and viscous."

Cameron said: "I enjoyed Prometheus. I thought it was great. I thought it was Ridley returning to science fiction with gusto, with great tactical performance, beautiful photography, great native 3D. There might have been a few things that I would have done differently, but that's not the point—you could say that about any movie." However, despite his praise, he also said he thought it "didn't add up logically."

=== Accolades ===
Year	Award	Category	Recipient	Result	Ref.
2012	Golden Trailer Awards	Summer 2012 Blockbuster Trailer	Prometheus / "Not Alone", 20th Century Fox, Wild Card	Nominated	
2012	Golden Trailer Awards	Best Sound Editing	Prometheus, 20th Century Fox, Skip Film	Nominated	
2012	Key Art Awards	Digital	"Weyland Industries" website	Won	
2012	Key Art Awards	Innovative Media	Prometheus	Won	
2012	Phoenix Film Critics Society	Best Visual Effects	Richard Stammers, Charley Henley and Martin Hill	Nominated	
2012	Satellite Awards	Visual Effects	Richard Stammers, Charley Henley and Martin Hill	Nominated	
2012	Satellite Awards	Sound (Editing and Mixing)	Victor Ray Ennis, Ann Scibelli, John Cucci and Mark P. Stoeckinger	Nominated	
2012	Sierra Awards	Best Art Direction	Alex Cameron	Won	
2012	Teen Choice Awards	Choice Movie: Breakout	Noomi Rapace	Nominated	
2012	Teen Choice Awards	Choice Summer Movie: Action	Prometheus	Nominated	
2012	Teen Choice Awards	Choice Summer Movie Star: Female	Charlize Theron (also for Snow White & the Huntsman)	Nominated	
2013	Academy Awards	Best Visual Effects	Richard Stammers, Trevor Wood, Charley Henley and Martin Hill	Nominated	
2013	ADG Excellence in Production Design Award	Fantasy Film	Arthur Max	Nominated	
2013	BAFTA Awards	Special Visual Effects	Richard Stammers, Charley Henley, Trevor Wood, Paul Butterworth	Nominated	
2013	Critic's Choice Award	Best Sci-Fi/Horror Movie	Prometheus	Nominated	
2013	Golden Reel Awards	Best Sound Editing — Sound Effects and Foley in a Feature Film	Prometheus	Nominated	
2013	Visual Effects Society	Outstanding Compositing in a Feature Motion Picture	Xavier Bourque, Sam Cole, Simone Riginelli, Denis Scolan for "Engineers & the Orrery"	Nominated	
2013	Visual Effects Society	Outstanding Created Environment in a Live Action Feature Motion Picture	Julien Bolbach, Marco Genovesi, Martin Riedel, Marco Rolandi for "LV-233"	Nominated	
2013	Visual Effects Society	Outstanding Visual Effects in a Visual Effects-Driven Feature Motion Picture	Paul Butterworth, Charley Henley, Allen Maris, Richard Stammers for Prometheus	Nominated	
2013	London Film Critics' Circle Awards	Supporting Actor of the Year	Michael Fassbender	Nominated	
2013	Saturn Awards	Best Science Fiction Film	Prometheus	Nominated	
2013	Saturn Awards	Best Supporting Actor	Michael Fassbender	Nominated	

== Sequels ==
Scott discussed a continuation of the series in March 2012, saying that Prometheus leaves many questions unanswered and that these could be answered in a sequel. In June 2012, Lindelof said that while plot elements were deliberately left unresolved so that they could be answered in a sequel, he and Scott had thoroughly discussed what should be resolved so that Prometheus could stand alone, as a sequel was not guaranteed. By August 2012, a sequel was announced to be in development for release no earlier than 2014. Lindelof chose not to work on the new film, citing other commitments.

Titled Alien: Covenant, the sequel premiered in London, England on May 4, 2017, and was released in the United States on May 19, 2017. Set eleven years after the events of Prometheus, Alien: Covenant's story follows the crew of the Covenant space ship who land on an uncharted and seemingly uninhabited planet. The film stars Katherine Waterston, Danny McBride, Demián Bichir, Jussie Smollett, Amy Seimetz, Carmen Ejogo, Callie Hernandez, Alex England and Billy Crudup. On release, Alien: Covenant earned a worldwide box office gross of $240.9 million (compared to Prometheus's $403.4 million), and received generally favorable reviews. In 2013, a comic book series was announced by Dark Horse Comics that serves as a spin-off to Prometheus. The series, titled Fire and Stone, is an Alien vs. Predator crossover featuring content exclusive to Prometheus. The first issue of Fire and Stone was released on September 10, 2014.
