= Kamaldeep Bhui =

Professor of Psychiatry

- Occupation: Professor of Psychiatry
- Awards: Commander of the Order of the British Empire (2017)

Academic background
- Education: United Medical & Dental Schools of Guy’s and St Thomas’ Hospitals (UMDS)

Academic work
- Institutions: University of Oxford; Queen Mary University of London

Kamaldeep Bhui is a Kenyan-born British clinical academic psychiatrist and psychoanalytic psychotherapist. He is an expert on cultural psychiatry, ethnic disparities in psychiatric disorders, cultural competency and public mental health. His interdisciplinary work includes creative arts, lived experience, digital interventions, air pollution and climate change. He is a Professor of Psychiatry at the University of Oxford and Honorary Professor in the Centre for Psychiatry at Queen Mary University of London. In 2017, Bhui was named a Commander of Order of the British Empire (CBE) in the Queen's New Years' Honors List in honor of his services to mental health care and research.

Bhui is NIHR Senior Investigator, Director of NIHR Applied Research Collaborative - Thames Valley, Director of the World Psychiatric Association Collaborating Centre. He is senior research fellow at Wadham College, Oxford; and a member of MQ Science Council.

== Biography ==
Bhui was born in Kenya to a family of Punjabi Sikh background, and educated in the United Kingdom.

Bhui graduated from the United Medical & Dental Schools of Guy’s and St Thomas’ Hospitals with a medical degree in 1988. He holds postgraduate qualifications in psychiatry, mental health studies, epidemiology, and psychotherapy. He completed clinical training in London, secured a first Consultant appointment in 1999, followed in 2000 and 2003 by Consultant/Senior Lecturer and Consultant/Professorial posts in East London Foundation Trust and Queen Mary University of London. Bhui was subsequently appointed Professor of Cultural Psychiatry and Epidemiology at the Research Centre for Psychiatry at St Bartholomew’s Hospital and the London School of Medicine.

Bhui is co-founder of Careif, an international mental health charity, past Editor in Chief or British Journal of Psychiatry (2013-2023) and past President of World Association of Cultural Psychiatry (2012-2018).

== Books ==
- Bhugra, D., & Bhui, K. (2001). Cross-cultural psychiatry: a practical guide. Arnold.
- Bhugra, D., & Bhui, K. (Eds.). (2018). Textbook of cultural psychiatry. Cambridge University Press.
- Bhugra, D., Bhui, K., Wong, S. Y. S., & Gilman, S. E. (Eds.). (2018). Oxford textbook of public mental health. Oxford University Press.
- Bhui, K. E. (Ed.) (2002). Racism and mental health: Prejudice and suffering. Jessica Kingsley Publishers.
- Bhui, K. (Ed.). (2013). Elements of culture and mental health: critical questions for clinicians. RCPsych Publications.
- Bhui, K. and Bhugra, D. (Eds.) (2020). Terrorism, Violent Radicalisation and Mental Health. Oxford University Press.
- The Maharaja’s Bodyguard, fantasy fiction, 2025, published by Troubador.
