= Foundation for Psychocultural Research =

US nonprofit organization

The Foundation for Psychocultural Research logo

The Foundation for Psychocultural Research (The FPR) is a 501(c)(3) nonprofit organization based in Los Angeles that supports and advances interdisciplinary and integrative research and training on interactions of culture, neuroscience, psychiatry, and psychology, with an emphasis on cultural processes as central. The primary objective is to help articulate and support the creation of transformative paradigms that address issues of fundamental clinical and social concern.

== History ==
The FPR was founded in December 1999 with a gift from Robert Lemelson, a documentary filmmaker and psychological anthropologist on the faculty of the University of California, Los Angeles (UCLA). The FPR supports research and other scholarly activities that encourage integrative approaches by bringing together experts from the neurosciences, psychology, psychiatry, and anthropology.

== Programs (2001–2016) ==
Participants in the FPR's inaugural interdisciplinary workshop at Ojai in June 2001 advocated research strategies that recognize and integrate multiple levels of analysis – from biological processes like postpartum olfactory learning, to psychological concepts like attachment, to social, cultural, economic, and political conditions affecting mother-infant interactions – and provide a better understanding of culture and context, including local variations in environments, behaviors, beliefs, and experiences.

The FPR was a key supporter of the FPR-UCLA Center for Culture, Brain, and Development (CBD) and the FPR-Hampshire College Program in Culture, Brain, and Development. The FPR CBD programs were designed to foster integrative, cross-disciplinary research that focuses on how culture and context interact with brain development. In 2009 the FPR created a program for Culture, Brain, Development, and Mental Health (CBDMH). The primary objective of CBDMH, which was co-directed by psychological anthropologist Doug Hollan of UCLA and cultural psychologist Steve López of USC, was to establish a strong program in cultural psychiatry, with an emphasis on integrating neuroscience and social science perspectives. The research initiative was based around ongoing, sustainable field sites and programs in various locations across the globe. A training component was embedded within each of the ongoing research projects.

== Workshops and conferences ==
Through a series of planning workshops and conferences, the FPR continues to bring together scholars, researchers, and clinicians with overlapping interests to think across disciplinary boundaries in order to address social and clinical issues. To date, the FPR has hosted six international, interdisciplinary conferences at UCLA: (1) Posttraumatic Stress Disorder: Biological, Clinical, and Cultural Approaches to Trauma's Effects (13–15 December 2002; (2) Four Dimensions of Childhood: Brain, Mind, Culture, and Time (11–13 February 2005); (3) Seven Dimensions of Emotion (30 March–1 April 2007); (4) Cultural and Biological Contexts of Psychiatric Disorder: Implications for Diagnosis and Treatment (22–24 January 2010); (5) Culture, Mind, and Brain: Emerging Concepts, Methods, and Applications 19–20 October 2012); and (6) A Critical Moment: Sex/Gender Research at the Intersections of Culture, Brain, and Behavior (23–24 October 2015).

Participants from these meetings have contributed papers to three published volumes linking several fields, including developmental psychobiology, cultural and biological anthropology, the study of psychological trauma, transcultural psychiatry, and social neuroscience: (1) Understanding Trauma: Integrating Biological, Clinical, and Cultural Perspectives (Cambridge University Press, 2007), edited by cultural psychiatrist Laurence Kirmayer (McGill University), Robert Lemelson, and physician/neuroscientist Mark Barad (UCLA); (2) Formative Experiences: The Interaction of Caregiving, Culture, and Developmental Psychobiology (Cambridge University Press, 2010), edited by biocultural anthropologist Carol M. Worthman (Emory University), developmental psychobiologist Paul M. Plotsky (Emory University), child psychiatrist Daniel Schechter (Université de Genève), and FPR project director Constance A. Cummings; and (3) Re-Visioning Psychiatry: Cultural Phenomenology, Critical Neuroscience, and Global Mental Health (Cambridge University Press, 2015), edited by Laurence Kirmayer (McGill University), Robert Lemelson, and Constance A. Cummings

== Current activities ==
The FPR is currently focusing on Culture, Mind, and Brain (CMB) research. CMB is an integrative approach to understanding human evolution, cognition, emotion, self, agency, ritual, religion, and other concepts that are not confined to any one scientific discipline. Crucially, advances in one discipline can redefine work in others, compelling researchers to bridge disciplines with new models that depict interactions between brain, mind, development, the social world, and cultural diversity.
