= 40 Years of Silence: An Indonesian Tragedy =

2009 Indonesian documentary film

- Taiwanese: 沉默之聲－印尼悲歌
- Directed by: Robert Lemelson
- Produced by: Robert Lemelson; Alessandra Pasquino
- Narrated by: Robert Lemelson; Romo Baskara Wardaya; Geoffrey Robinson; John Roosa
- Cinematography: Dag Yngvesson
- Edited by: Kathy Huang; Wing Ko; Emily Ng; Pietro Scalia; Heidi Zimmerman
- Music by: Malcolm Cross; Nyoman Wenten
- Production company: Elemental Productions
- Release date: 2009 (United States)
- Running time: 86 minutes
- Country: United States
- Language: English
- Budget: $400,000

40 Years of Silence: An Indonesian Tragedy is a documentary film by anthropologist Robert Lemelson about the personal effects of the Indonesian mass killings of 1965-1966. The film was shot on the islands of Bali and Java from 2002–2006. The score is a collaboration between the British composer Malcolm Cross and the Balinese musician Nyoman Wenten, and combines Western tonalities and chordal structures with Balinese and Javanese scalar progressions and melodies. The film was released in the United States in 2009, and has had limited screenings throughout Indonesia.

== Overview ==
An estimated 500,000 people were killed during a purge of suspected communists throughout Indonesia, in one of the largest mass-killings of the 20th century. General Suharto came to control of the Indonesian military and then the government following a failed coup d'état on September 30, 1965. 40 Years of Silence: An Indonesian Tragedy follows the testimonies of four individuals and their families from Central Java and Bali, two regions greatly affected by the purge. Each family discusses what it was like for survivors of the killings. The film uses three historians (Romo Baskara Wardaya, Geoffrey Robinson, John Roosa) and anthropologist Robert Lemelson as the narrators, providing the historical setting for the families’ stories. These historical explanations are intercut with each character's narration of their experience of the killings and their aftermath. As the stories unfold, the film narrates the significant political, economic and cultural events underlying the massacres. The film describes aspects of how the extrajudicial killings were enacted, as well as what life under Suharto’s autocratic “New Order” regime was like for survivors, many of whom were stigmatized as family PKI communist party members. The film concludes with a demonstration of the beginnings of a more open period in Indonesia's history after the fall of the Suharto regime and the establishment of a period of democratization and reformation.

== See also ==
- The Act of Killing (2012)
- The Look of Silence (2014)
