= Satellite contribution =

Means to transport video programming by satellite

A Satellite contribution link or service is a means to transport video programming by a satellite link from a remote source (such as an outside broadcast unit) to a broadcaster's studio or from the studio to a satellite TV uplink centre (for onward distribution by DTH, fibre, cable etc.).

Signal path for a Satellite Contribution link from a broadcaster's studio to DTH viewers

Such contribution links are often made by terrestrial connections (landline, fibre, etc.) but the use of a satellite "hop" provides advantages in some situations.

Satellite operators and third party agencies provide satellite contribution links for the occasional or regular use of the client broadcasters.

== Advantages ==
In remote locations, using terrestrial links such as fibre is prohibitively expensive whereas satellite can cheaply and easily overcome the "first-mile" connectivity gaps in rural and other remote areas. A comparable fibre service would have to use extremely diverse routing to achieve the same availability.

A single satellite link can span a huge distance that would take a terrestrial link through many countries and commercial operators. The satellite operator provides a single point of accountability whereas establishing a link and resolving service interruptions with fibre can prove difficult, especially across national borders and with multiple carriers.

Duplication of active components in the transmission and reception sites, and in-orbit backup satellite capacity provides a fully redundant contribution connection.

Monitoring of the signal allows for fast and effective changes before problems affect the service. E.g. uplink power may be automatically increased during adverse weather conditions.

SES provides an example service that provides permanent delivery of live and recorded TV and radio signals to the company's Luxembourg uplink facility (used for 15 satellites, serving over 120 million viewers) from almost any location across Europe.

== Technology ==
Whereas satellite contribution links may be provided using transmission in K_{u} band (or even C band) frequencies, it is increasingly common to use the higher frequency Ka-band uplink and downlink for the contribution feed, as that band is relatively unused.

Ka-band provides for a smaller contribution uplink dish size (typically 1.8m compared to a minimum of 2.4m using Ku-band) and it can also be used as a backup for the DTH uplink itself or when a full DTH uplink antenna (typically 9m) cannot be accommodated at the client's studio.

Signals at the studio playout centre or outside broadcast unit are typically MPEG-4 compressed and transmitted in DVB-S2 for turnaround uplink to the DTH satellites, without additional processing, although IP-over-satellite transmission may also be used.

In September 2022, satellite operator, SES and live video streaming specialists, LiveU, launched an integrated hybrid end-to-end video contribution and distribution system for broadcasting live events using 4G/5G to transmit video from the remote venue to SES teleports, as an alternative to an SNG truck, and reach a global audience over SES’s satellite and IP network.

== Advanced applications ==
Whereas a contribution link from a studio to a DTH uplink centre is usually provided within a single satellite footprint, the Astra 4A/Sirius 4 satellite provides for an innovative intercontinental contribution link service using a single Ka-band transponder with a European footprint and a Ku-band transponder serving southern Africa. Contribution feeds can be transferred from one region to the other, and in one frequency band to the other, in a single satellite hop.

== See also ==
- International Media Switzerland l Global Satellite Distribution Services
- SES
- Intelsat
- DirecTV
- AT&T
- Sirius
- Ka-band
