= Cross-cultural psychiatry =

Subfield of psychiatry

Cross-cultural psychiatry (also known as ethnopsychiatry or transcultural psychiatry or cultural psychiatry) is a branch of psychiatry concerned with the cultural context of mental disorders and the challenges of addressing ethnic diversity in psychiatric services. It emerged as a coherent field from several strands of work, including surveys of the prevalence and form of disorders in different cultures or countries; the study of migrant populations and ethnic diversity within countries; and analysis of psychiatry itself as a cultural product.

The early literature was associated with colonialism and with observations by asylum psychiatrists or anthropologists who tended to assume the universal applicability of Western psychiatric diagnostic categories. A seminal paper by Arthur Kleinman in 1977 followed by a renewed dialogue between anthropology and psychiatry, is seen as having heralded a "new cross-cultural psychiatry". However, Kleinman later pointed out that culture often became incorporated in only superficial ways, and that for example 90% of DSM-IV categories are culture-bound to North America and Western Europe, and yet the "culture-bound syndrome" label is only applied to "exotic" conditions outside Euro-American society. Reflecting advances in medical anthropology, DSM-5 replaced the term "culture-bound syndrome" with a set of terms covering cultural concepts of distress: cultural syndromes (which may not be bound to a specific culture but circulate across cultures); cultural idioms of distress (local modes of expressing suffering that may not be syndromes); causal explanations (that attribute symptoms or suffering to specific causal factors rooted in local ontologies); and folk diagnostic categories (which may be part of ethnomedical systems and healing practices).

== Definition ==
Cultural psychiatry looks at whether psychiatric classifications of disorders are appropriate to different cultures or ethnic groups. It often argues that psychiatric illnesses represent social constructs as well as genuine medical conditions, and as such have social uses peculiar to the social groups in which they are created and legitimized. It studies psychiatric classifications in different cultures, whether informal (e.g. category terms used in different languages) or formal (for example the World Health Organization's ICD, the American Psychiatric Association's DSM, or the Chinese Society of Psychiatry's CCMD). The field has increasingly had to address the process of globalization. It is said every city has a different culture and that the urban environment, and how people adapt or struggle to adapt to it, can play a crucial role in the onset or worsening of mental illness.

However, some scholars developing an anthropology of mental illness (Lézé, 2014) consider that attention to culture is not enough if it is decontextualized from historical events, and history in more general sense. An historical and politically informed perspective can counteract some of the risks related to promoting universalized 'global mental health' programs as well as the increasing hegemony of diagnostic categories such as PTSD (Didier Fassin and Richard Rechtman analyze this issue in their book The Empire of Trauma). Roberto Beneduce, who devoted many years to research and clinical practice in West Africa (Mali, among the Dogon) and in Italy with migrants, strongly emphasizes this shift. Inspired by the thought of Frantz Fanon, Beneduce points to forms of historical consciousness and selfhood as well as history-related suffering as central dimensions of a 'critical ethnopsychiatry' or 'critical transcultural psychiatry'.

== History ==
As a named field within the larger discipline of psychiatry, cultural psychiatry has a relatively short history. In 1955, a program in transcultural psychiatry was established at McGill University in Montreal by Eric Wittkower from psychiatry and Jacob Fried from the department of anthropology.

In 1957, at the International Psychiatric Congress in Zurich, Wittkower organized a meeting that was attended by psychiatrists from 20 countries, including many who became major contributors to the field of cultural psychiatry: Tsung-Yi Lin (Taiwan), Thomas Lambo (Nigeria), Morris Carstairs (Britain), Carlos Alberto Seguin (Peru) and Pow-Meng Yap (Hong Kong). The American Psychiatric Association established a Committee on Transcultural Psychiatry in 1964, followed by the Canadian Psychiatric Association in 1967. H.B.M. Murphy of McGill founded the World Psychiatric Association Section on Transcultural Psychiatry in 1970. By the mid-1970s there were active transcultural psychiatry societies in England, France, Italy and Cuba.

There are several scientific journals devoted to cross-cultural issues: Transcultural Psychiatry (est. 1956, originally as Transcultural Psychiatric Research Review, and now the official journal of the WPA Section on Transcultural Psychiatry), Psychopathologie Africaine (1965), Culture Medicine & Psychiatry (1977), Curare (1978), and World Cultural Psychiatry Research Review (2006). The Foundation for Psychocultural Research at UCLA has published an important volume on psychocultural aspects of trauma and more recently landmark volumes entitled Formative Experiences: the Interaction of Caregiving, Culture, and Developmental Psychobiology edited by Carol Worthman, Paul Plotsky, Daniel Schechter and Constance Cummings, Re-Visioning Psychiatry: Cultural Phenomenology, Critical Neuroscience, and Global Mental Health edited by Laurence J. Kirmayer, Robert Lemelson and Constance Cummings, and Culture, Mind, and Brain: Emerging Concepts, Models, and Applications edited by Laurence J. Kirmayer, Carol Worthman, Shinobu Kitayama, Robert Lemelson and Constance A. Cummings.

It is argued that a cultural perspective can help psychiatrists become aware of the hidden assumptions and limitations of current psychiatric theory and practice and can identify new approaches appropriate for treating the increasingly diverse populations seen in psychiatric services around the world. The recent revision of the nosology of the American Psychiatric Association, DSM-5, includes a Cultural Formulation Interview that aims to help clinicians contextualize diagnostic assessment. A related approach to cultural assessment involves cultural consultation which works with interpreters and cultural brokers to develop a cultural formulation and treatment plan that can assist clinicians.

== Organizations ==
The main professional organizations devoted to the field are the WPA Section on Transcultural Psychiatry, the Society for the Study of Psychiatry and Culture, and the World Association for Cultural Psychiatry. Many other mental health organizations have interest groups or sections devoted to issues of culture and mental health.

There are active research and training programs in cultural psychiatry at several academic centers around the world, notably the Division of Social and Transcultural Psychiatry at McGill University, Harvard University, the University of Toronto, and University College London. Other organizations are devoted to cross-cultural adaptation of research and clinical methods. In 1993 the Transcultural Psychosocial Organization (TPO) was founded. The TPO has developed a system of intervention aimed at countries with little or no mental health care. They train local people to become mental health workers, often using people who previously have provided mental health guidance of some kind. The TPO provides training material that is adapted to local culture, language and distinct traumatic events that might have occurred in the region where the organization is operating. Avoiding Western approaches to mental health, the TPO sets up what becomes a local non-governmental organization that is self-sustainable, as well as economically and politically independent of any state. The TPO projects have been successful in both Uganda and Cambodia.
