= Robert Lemelson =

- Born: Robert Bush Lemelson
- Education: University of Chicago (MA); University of California, Los Angeles (PhD)
- Occupations: Anthropologist; educator; film producer; journalist
- Organization: Elemental Productions

Robert Bush Lemelson is an American cultural anthropologist and film producer. He received his M.A. from the University of Chicago and Ph.D. from the Department of Anthropology at the University of California, Los Angeles. Lemelson's area of specialty is transcultural psychiatry; Southeast Asian Studies, particularly Indonesia; and psychological and medical anthropology. He is a research anthropologist in the Semel Institute of Neuroscience UCLA, and an adjunct professor of anthropology at UCLA. His scholarly work has appeared in journals and books. Lemelson founded Elemental Productions in 2008, a documentary production company, and has directed and produced numerous ethnographic films.

Lemelson is involved in a number of philanthropic ventures. He is the president of The Foundation for Psychocultural Research, a research foundation that supports work integrating the social and neurosciences. He also acts a director for The Lemelson Foundation, a foundation started by his father Jerome Lemelson to support inventors, invention and innovation in the United States and the developing world. Lemelson has also funded a number of programs supporting scholarship and research in Anthropology through the Robert Lemelson Foundation, which is a separate foundation from The Lemelson Foundation. These include the Lemelson Anthropological Scholars program at UCLA, and the Lemelson-SPA conference fund and the Lemelson-SPA student fellows program administered by the Society for Psychological Anthropology.

== Filmography ==
Film title	Type	Release date	Short Synopsis	TRT
Tajen	Documentary short	2016	A sensory ethnography exploring multiple elements of the Balinese cockfight.	29 min
Bitter Honey	Documentary Feature	2015	Chronicles the lives of three polygamous families living in Bali, Indonesia. The film follows the wives from their introduction to the polygamous lifestyle to the emotional hardships and jealousies to their struggle for empowerment and equal rights.	81 min
Standing on the Edge of a Thorn	Documentary short	2013	A portrait of a family in rural Central Java, Indonesia grappling with poverty, mental illness, and participation in the sex trade.	33 min
Jathilan: Trance and Possession in Java	Documentary Short	2012	A film about Jathilan, a folk dance practiced for centuries in Java that uses the power of music and dance to channel powerful and sometimes terrifying forces.	27 min
Ngaben: Emotion and Restraint in a Balinese Heart	Documentary Short	2012	A film about the Balinese funerary ritual called Ngaben.	27 min
Memory of My Face	Documentary Short	2011	Part of the documentary series Afflictions: Culture and Mental Illness in Indonesia - Volume 1, Psychotic Disorders. The film follows Bambang Rudjito and illustrates how the residues of colonialism and the pervasive influence of globalization affects the subjective experience of mental illness.	22 min
Ritual Burdens	Documentary Short	2011	Part of the documentary series Afflictions: Culture and Mental Illness in Indonesia - Volume 1, Psychotic Disorders. The film follows Ni Ketut Kasih and questions how communal spiritual obligations may be folded into personal schemas of stress to trigger episodes of mental illness	25 min
Kites and Monsters	Documentary Short	2011	Part of the documentary series Afflictions: Culture and Mental Illness in Indonesia - Volume 1, Psychotic Disorders. The film follows Wayan Yoga from boyhood to manhood and discovers the aspects of culture that may guide developmental neuropsychiatric processes.	22 min
Shadows and Illuminations	Documentary Short	2010	Part of the documentary series Afflictions: Culture and Mental Illness in Indonesia - Volume 1, Psychotic Disorders. The film follows Nyoman Kereta and explores how non-normative mental events and behavior, including auditory and visual hallucinations, can be understood or interpreted in multiple ways.	35 min
The Bird Dancer	Documentary Short	2010	Part of the documentary series Afflictions: Culture and Mental Illness in Indonesia - Volume 1, Psychotic Disorders. The film follows Gusti Ayu Suartini and focuses on the social stigma of neuropsychiatric disorder and the human suffering it entails.	40 min
Family Victim	Documentary Short	2010	Part of the documentary series Afflictions: Culture and Mental Illness in Indonesia - Volume 1, Psychotic Disorders. The film follows Estu Wardhani and examines the bi-directional influences between an individual considered to have a disruptive or troublesome personality and his social world.	38 min
40 Years of Silence: An Indonesian Tragedy	Documentary Feature	2009	The first documentary to explore the personal effects of the mass killings 500,000 to over a million people in Indonesia in 1965–66. The film follows the testimonies of four individuals and their families.	96 min
Movements and Madness	Documentary feature	2006	The story of an anthropologist's search to understand a person with a severe neuropsychiatric disorder in rural Indonesia, and the ethical dilemmas involved when a research scientist attempts to aid his subject.	71 min

== Select Journal Articles ==
- Lemelson, R.; Tucker, A. (2015). "Steps Toward an Integration of Psychological and Visual Anthropology: Issues Raised in the Production of the Film Series Afflictions: Culture and Mental Illness in Indonesia". Ethos. 43 (1): 6–39. doi:10.1111/etho.12070.
- Lemelson, R; Suryani, L.K (2006). "Cultural Formulation of Psychiatric Diagnoses: The Spirits, Penyakit Ngeb and the Social Suppression of Memory: A Complex Clinical Case from Bali". Culture, Medicine and Psychiatry. 30 (3): 389–413. doi:10.1007/s11013-006-9026-y. PMID 17089200. S2CID 22024051.
- Lemelson, R (2004). "Traditional Healing and its Discontents: Efficacy and Traditional Therapies of Neuropsychiatric Disorders in Bali". Medical Anthropology Quarterly. 18 (1): 48–76. doi:10.1525/maq.2004.18.1.48. PMID 15098427.
- Lemelson, R (2003). "Obsessive-Compulsive Disorder in Bali: The Cultural Shaping of a Neuropsychiatric Disorder". Transcultural Psychiatry. 4 (30): 377–408. doi:10.1177/13634615030403004. PMID 14649851. S2CID 36844273.

== Select Book Chapters ==
- "Afflictions: Psychopathology and Recovery in a Cultural Context" by Lemelson, R., and Tucker, A., in Kirmayer, L., Lemelson, R., and Cummings, C. eds. in Revisioning psychiatry: Cultural Phenomenology, Critical Neuroscience and Global Mental Health. 483–514. 2015.
- "Fear and Silence in Burma and Indonesia: Comparing Two National Tragedies and Two Individual Outcomes of Trauma" by Lemelson, R., Thein-Lemelson, S. in Ataria, Y., Gurevitz, D., Pedaya, H., and Neria, Y. eds. in Interdisciplinary Handbook of Trauma and Culture. 2016.
- "Anak PKI!: Multigenerational Trauma in a Javanese boy" by Lemelson, R., Ng, Emily and Supartini, N. in Worthman, C., Plotsky, P., Schecter, D. and Cummings C. Formative Experiences: The Interaction of Caregiving, Culture, and Developmental Psychobiology Cambridge: Cambridge University Press, 2010
- "Children and Post Traumatic Stress Disorder" by Lemelson, R. in Shweder, R. et al. Ed. Chicago Companion to the Child. Chicago: University of Chicago Press, 2009.
- "Neuropsychiatric Disorders and Traditional Healing in Indonesia: The Question of Efficacy" by Lemelson, R. in Maldonado, M. ed. Psychiatrists and Traditional Healers: Unwitting Partners in Global Mental Health. London, UK: John Wiley & Sons, 2008.
- "Trauma in Context: Integrating Biological, Clinical and Cultural Perspectives" by Lemelson, R., Kirmayer, L, Barad, M. in Kirmayer, L, Lemelson, R., Barad, M. eds. Understanding Trauma: Integrating Cultural, Psychological and Biological Perspectives. Cambridge: Cambridge University Press, 2007.
- "Epilogue: Trauma and the Vicissitudes of Interdisciplinary Integration" by Kirmayer, L, Lemelson, R., Barad, M. in Kirmayer, L, Lemelson, R., Barad, M. eds. Understanding Trauma: Integrating Cultural, Psychological and Biological Perspectives. Cambridge: Cambridge University, 2007

== Edited volumes ==
- Understanding Trauma: Integrating Cultural, Psychological and Biological Perspectives. Kirmayer, L, Lemelson, R., Barad, M. eds. Cambridge: Cambridge University Press, 2007.
- Re-Visioning Psychiatry: Cultural Phenomenology, Critical Neuroscience and Global Mental Health. Kirmayer, L, Lemelson, R., Cummings, C. eds. Cambridge: Cambridge University Press, 2015.]

== Books ==
- Afflictions: Steps Toward A Visual Psychological Anthropology. Lemelson, R. Tucker, A. New York: Palgrave Macmillan. 2017.]
