= Houston Galveston Institute =

Non-for-profit organization for Postmodern collaborative therapy

- Founded: 1977
- Founder: Harlene Anderson, Harry Goolishian, Paul Dell, George Pulliam
- Location: Houston, Texas
- Website: www.talkhgi.org

The Houston Galveston Institute is a non-profit organization that offers collaborative counselling and postmodern therapy to individuals, families and communities. The institute is strongly associated with collaborative language systems (or Collaborative therapy), a type of postmodern therapy that works with clients via a cooperative partnership to access their own natural resources and develop solutions to their problems. The Houston Galveston Institute is a sponsor of the International Journal of Collaborative Practices.

== History ==
The Houston Galveston Institute dates back to the 1950s at the University of Texas Medical Branch in Galveston, Texas, with the federally funded family therapy project to research the Multiple impact therapy. In 1978, the Galveston Family Institute was established by Harlene Anderson, Ph.D., Paul Dell, Ph.D., Harry Goolishian, Ph.D., and George Pulliam, M.S.W. to meet the demands of mental health professionals seeking to increase their understanding of families and further develop their skills in systems-oriented therapy with individuals, couples, families, and groups. From this group, and later including Harold Goolishian's protege Dr. Neil F. Ravella and Lee Winderman, the ideas of Collaborative Language System Theory emerged. The institute officially became the Houston Galveston Institute in the 1990s when the project expanded beyond Galveston. Other contributors are Diane Gehart, Sue Levin, Diana Carleton, Lynn Hoffmann, Tom Andersen, Vivien Burr, John Cromby, Kenneth Gergen, Mary Gergen, Lois Holzman, Imelda McCarthy, Susan McDaniel, Sheila McNamee, Robert Neimeyer, David Nightingale, Peggy Penn, Sallyann Roth, Jaakko Seikkula, John Shotter, Lois Shawver, and Michael White.

It was originally located in Houston's Montrose area.

== Collaborative approach ==
This type of approach formed at Houston Galveston Institute is that “problems are not solved, but dissolved in language.” Collaborative therapy is now recognized as one of the current schools of family therapy and is included in graduate school textbooks. Some of the general philosophic assumptions of the theory are:

- Maintaining Skepticism – A critical attitude about how knowledge is ‘known’
- Eluding Generalizations – Avoid the dominant discourse
- Knowledge as an Interactive Social Process – Dialectic, conversational knowledge
- Privileging Local Knowledge – Persons and communities know themselves
- Language as a Creative Social Process – Language creates our knowledge
- Knowledge and Language as Transforming – Conversations change people
- Postmodern is only One of Many Narratives – One of many languages

These assumptions are post-modern in nature and inform the clinical practice of the Collaborative therapy approach. The following list is of the various impacts that these assumptions have on the therapist and therapeutic relationship.

- Mutually Inquiring Conversational Partnership – Therapy as a partnership
- Relational Expertise – Client and therapist bring their expertise together
- Not-Knowing – Humility before the client
- Being Public – Therapist is open with their thoughts
- Living with Uncertainty – Enjoy the spontaneity of a conversation
- Mutually Transforming – Hermeneutic circle, reciprocal effect on client and therapist
- Orienting towards Everyday Ordinary Life – Tap into natural resilience of clients.

Collaborative therapy shares similar epistemological roots with Narrative Therapy and Solution-focused therapy. These therapies are similar yet distinct. An article by Gehart & Paré summarizes the differences between the therapies in the following way: “In collaborative language systems, the “dis-solving” of problems through conversation (Anderson & Goolishian, 1988; Goolishian & Anderson, 1992), in narrative therapy, reauthoring one's story about the problem (White 2004; White & Epston, 1990), and in solution-focused therapy (SFT), building solutions (Berg, 1994; de Shazer, 1994; Lipchik, 2002)”

== Current practice ==
The Houston Galveston Institute (HGI) is currently involved in the use of the Collaborative Approach in training, counselling, and researching. The office is located in Houston’s Greenway/Upper Kirby and is serving community needs while training students from local, national, and international programs. HGI also provides various training programs for mental health professionals who want to develop a collaborative and postmodern approach to therapeutic work with individuals, couples, families, groups, organizations, and communities.

== International and national affiliates ==
The institute currently offers an International Certificate in Collaborative Practices program with participation around the world. The program is sponsored by the Houston Galveston Institute and the Taos Institute. It is a response to the numerous practitioners around the world who are interested in expanding their knowledge and competency in collaborative practice. The Certificate Program provides practitioners across disciplines (therapy, organization development, education, and research) an intensive, in-depth study of collaborative practices based on postmodern-social construction philosophy. The Program includes the study of the theoretical and philosophical assumptions and their application to practice in a variety of contexts and cultures. The program is offered in Brazil, Colombia, Czech Republic, Germany, China, Mexico, United States, and Canada. In 2009, the International Journal of Collaborative Practices was founded in order to publish collaborative works developing worldwide.
