= Adverse childhood experiences =

Traumatic events that occur during childhood

Adverse childhood experiences (ACEs) include childhood emotional, physical, or sexual abuse and household dysfunction during childhood. The categories are verbal abuse, physical abuse, sexual abuse, parental domestic violence, violence against women, household substance abuse, household mental illness, incarcerated household members, and parental separation or divorce. The topic has been raised as an important emerging public health issue and framework following the publication of the Adverse Childhood Experiences Study in 1998 by the US Centers for Disease Control and Prevention (CDC) and Kaiser Permanente.

== Definition and types ==
=== The original ACEs framework ===
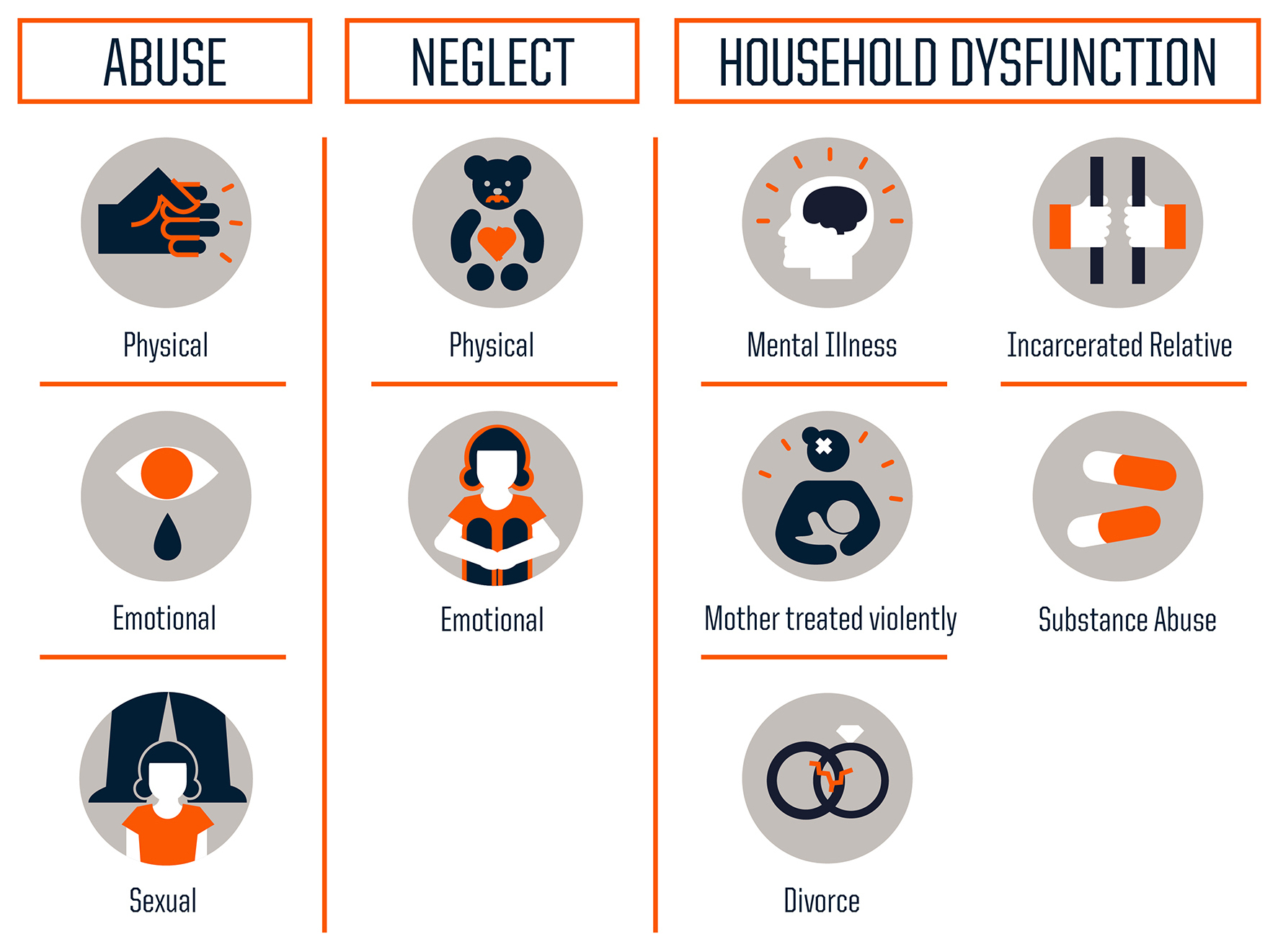
List of generalized events for adverse childhood experiences, which may be more common to occur in youth.

==== Abuse ====
- Physical abuse: causing physical harm, such as hitting, beating, or slapping.
- Emotional abuse: verbal threats, swearing at, insulting, or humiliating a child.
- Sexual abuse: abusive sexual behavior or contact.

==== Neglect ====
- Physical neglect: failure to meet a child's basic physical needs, such as food, shelter, or clothing.
- Emotional neglect: failure to meet a child's basic emotional needs, including love or affection.

==== Household dysfunction ====
- Witnessing violence against women: observing a woman in the family being treated violently.
- Household substance use: living with a household member who has a substance use disorder.
- Household mental illness: living with a household member who is mentally ill.
- Parental separation or divorce: experiencing the separation or divorce of parents.
- Incarcerated household member: having a household member serve time in jail or prison.

=== Community-Level ACEs ===
Exposure to ACEs is not limited to the home; they can also expand outside of the home and into the wider community. This can include:

- Seeing or experiencing community violence.
- Discrimination or racism.
- Living in an unsafe neighborhood.
- Bullying.
- Living in foster care.

== Prevalence ==
Adverse childhood experiences are common across all parts of societies. In 2009, the US Centers for Disease Control and Prevention (CDC) started collecting data on the prevalence of ACEs as part of the Behavioral Risk Factor Surveillance System (BRFSS). In the first year data was collected across five US states and included over 24,000 people. The prevalence of each ACE ranged from a high of 29.1% for household substance abuse to a low of having an incarcerated family member (7.2%). Approximately one quarter (25.9%) of respondents reported verbal abuse, 14.8% reported physical abuse, and 12.2% reported sexual abuse. For ACEs measuring family dysfunction, 26.6% reported separated or divorced parents; 19.4% reported that they had lived with someone who was depressed, mentally ill, or suicidal; and 16.3% reported witnessing domestic violence.

Men and women reported similar prevalences for each ACE, with the exception of sexual abuse (17.2% for women and 6.7% for men), living with a mentally ill household member (22.0% for women and 16.7% for men), and living with a substance-abusing family member (30.6% for women and 27.5% for men). Younger respondents more often reported living with an incarcerated and/or mentally ill household member. For each ACE, a sharp decrease was observed in prevalence reported by adults aged ≥55 years. For example, the prevalence of reported physical abuse was 16.9% among adults aged 18–24 years compared with 9.6% among those aged ≥55 years.

Approximately 41% of respondents reported having no ACEs, 22% reported one ACE, and 8.7% reported five or more ACEs. Men (6.9%) were less likely to report five or more ACEs compared with women (10.3%). Respondents aged ≥55 years reported the fewest ACEs, but the younger age groups did not differ from one another. Non-Hispanic blacks were less likely to report five or more ACEs (4.9%) compared with non-Hispanic whites (8.9%), Hispanics (9.1%), and other non-Hispanics (11.7%). However, non-Hispanic black respondents were not significantly more likely to report zero ACEs compared with other racial/ethnic groups. Respondents with the lowest educational attainment were significantly more likely to report five or more ACEs compared with those with higher education levels (14.9% versus 8.7% among high school graduates and 7.7% in those with more than a high school education). Overall, little state-by-state variation was observed in the number of ACEs reported by each respondent.

Sexual minority individuals have a higher prevalence of ACEs compared to heterosexual children. According to BRFSS data sexual minorities were more than twice as likely to report abuse, with bisexuals reporting the highest number of ACEs. This prevalence is slowly retreating with younger queer peoples experiencing fewer ACEs than previous generations, this should be tempered as ACEs are associated with early death. But rates among queer people of color are still some of the highest across all demographic groups, particularly among bisexual men and women of color.

There are no reliable global estimates for the prevalence of child maltreatment. Data for many countries, especially low- and middle-income countries, are lacking. Current estimates vary widely depending on the country and the method of research used. Approximately 20% of women and 5–10% of men report being sexually abused as children, while 25–50% of all children report being physically abused. Research has also demonstrated that ACE scores are related to increased rates and severity of psychiatric and mental disorders, as well as higher rates of prescription psychotropic medication use and higher rates of substance abuse/addiction.

Health outcome	Increased risk	Ref
Depression	34–317%	
Depression (postpartum)	131%	
Substance use (cannabis)	45%	
Substance use (illicit)	69%	
Heavy alcohol use	54%	

Health outcome	Increased risk	Ref
Asthma	32%	
Cancer (any)	117%	
COPD	44%	
Diabetes	52%	
Heart disease	107%	
Long COVID (ACEs 1-3)	31%	
Long COVID (ACEs 4+)	96%	

== Health outcomes due to ACEs ==
=== Childhood ===
With one in four children experiencing or witnessing a potentially traumatic event, the relationship between ACEs and poor health outcomes has been established for years. Exposure to multiple adverse childhood experiences can compound the effects of stress and adversity. Children who grow up in an unsafe environment can develop adverse health outcomes, affecting brain development, immune systems, and regulatory systems. Adverse childhood experiences can alter the structural development of neural networks and the biochemistry of neuroendocrine systems and may have long-term effects on the body, including speeding up the processes of disease and aging and compromising immune systems. Further research on ACEs determined that children who experience ACEs are more likely than their similar-aged peers to experience challenges in their biological, emotional, social, and cognitive functioning. Also, children who have experienced an ACE are at higher risk of being re-traumatized or suffering multiple ACEs. The amount and types of ACEs can cause significant negative impacts and increase the risk of internalizing and externalizing in children. Additionally behavioral challenges can arise in children who have been exposed to ACEs including juvenile recidivism, reduced resiliency, and lower academic performance.

Beyond the cumulative number of adverse experiences, research has increasingly examined whether the developmental timing of adversity influences outcomes. A systematic review of 118 studies published in The Lancet Psychiatry found that 74% of studies testing for timing effects of childhood maltreatment reported at least one sensitive period — a developmental window when exposure had a disproportionate impact on outcomes — though no consistent sensitive period was identified across studies for any given outcome. Related work has found that genetic pathways involved in regulating the opening of sensitive periods in brain development are associated with depression risk at the population level, and that these genetic factors may interact with caregiver physical or emotional abuse during early childhood (ages 1–5) to shape later depressive symptoms.

=== Adulthood ===
Adults with ACE exposure report having worse mental and physical health, more serious symptoms related to illnesses, and poorer life outcomes. Across numerous studies these effects go beyond behavioral and medical issues, and include changes in gene expression, higher levels of stress hormones, and reduced immune function.

==== Biological changes ====
Due to many of the early life stressors caused by exposure to ACEs, there are noted changes to the body in people with ACE exposures compared to people with little to no ACE exposure. This is most evident in structural changes in the brain with the hippocampus, the amygdala, and the corpus callosum being important targets of study. These areas of the brain are more vulnerable than others due to the higher density of glucocorticoid receptors in these regions of the brain. Multiple effects have been noted including diminished thickness, reduced size, and reduced size of connective networks in the brain.

==== Physical health ====
ACEs have been linked to numerous negative health and lifestyle issues into adulthood across multiple countries and regions including the United States, the European Union, South Africa, and Asia. Across all these groups researchers have reported seeing the adoption of higher rates of unhealthy lifestyle behavior including sexual risk taking, smoking, heavy drinking, and obesity. The associations between these lifestyle issues and ACEs shows a dose response relationship with people having four or more ACEs tend to have significantly more of these lifestyle problems. Two studies that also showed a dose-response relationship between ACEs and alcoholism found that individuals who had witnessed household substance abuse were more likely to abuse alcohol, regardless of ACE score.

Physical health problems arise in people with ACEs with a similar dose response relationship. Chronic illnesses such as asthma, arthritis, cardiovascular disease, cancer, diabetes, stroke, and migraines show increased symptom severity in step with exposure to ACEs.

Research shows that substance abuse is not an inevitable outcome of ACEs. Adoption of health-risky behaviors may be influenced by genetics and environmental factors.

=== Mental health ===
The link between mental health and childhood trauma and ACEs has been well known with multiple studies highlighting this link. Multiple mental health conditions have been found to have a dose response relationship with symptom severity and prevalence including depression, attention deficit hyperactivity disorder (ADHD), anxiety, suicidality, bipolar disorder and schizophrenia.

Depressive symptoms in adulthood show one of the strongest dose response relationships with ACEs, with an ACE score of one increasing the risk of depressive symptoms by 50% and an ACE score of four or more showing a fourfold increase. This relationship holds across ages, gender, and with different types of depression including postpartum depression. Mental health issues have been well known in the face of childhood trauma and exposure to ACEs is no different. According to a large study conducted in 21 countries, nearly one in three mental health conditions in adulthood are directly related to an adverse childhood experience.

Later research has also demonstrated that ACE scores are related to increased rates and severity of psychiatric and mental disorders, as well as higher rates of prescription psychotropic medication use and higher rates of substance abuse/addiction.

=== Epigenetic Transmission ===
Additionally, epigenetic transmission may occur due to stress during pregnancy or during interactions between mother and newborns. Maternal stress, depression, and exposure to partner violence have all been shown to have epigenetic effects on infants.

== Implementing practices ==
Globally knowledge about the prevalence and consequences of adverse childhood experiences has shifted policy makers and mental health practitioners towards increasing, trauma-informed and resilience-building practices. This work has been over 20 years in the making, bringing together research that is implemented in communities, education settings, public health departments, social services, faith-based organizations and criminal justice.

=== Communities ===
As knowledge about the prevalence and consequences of ACEs increases, more communities seek to integrate trauma-informed and resilience-building practices into their agencies and systems.

Indigenous populations show similar patterns of mental and physical health challenges as other minority groups. Interventions have been developed in American Indian tribal communities and have demonstrated that social support and cultural involvement can ameliorate the negative physical health effects of ACEs.

=== Education ===
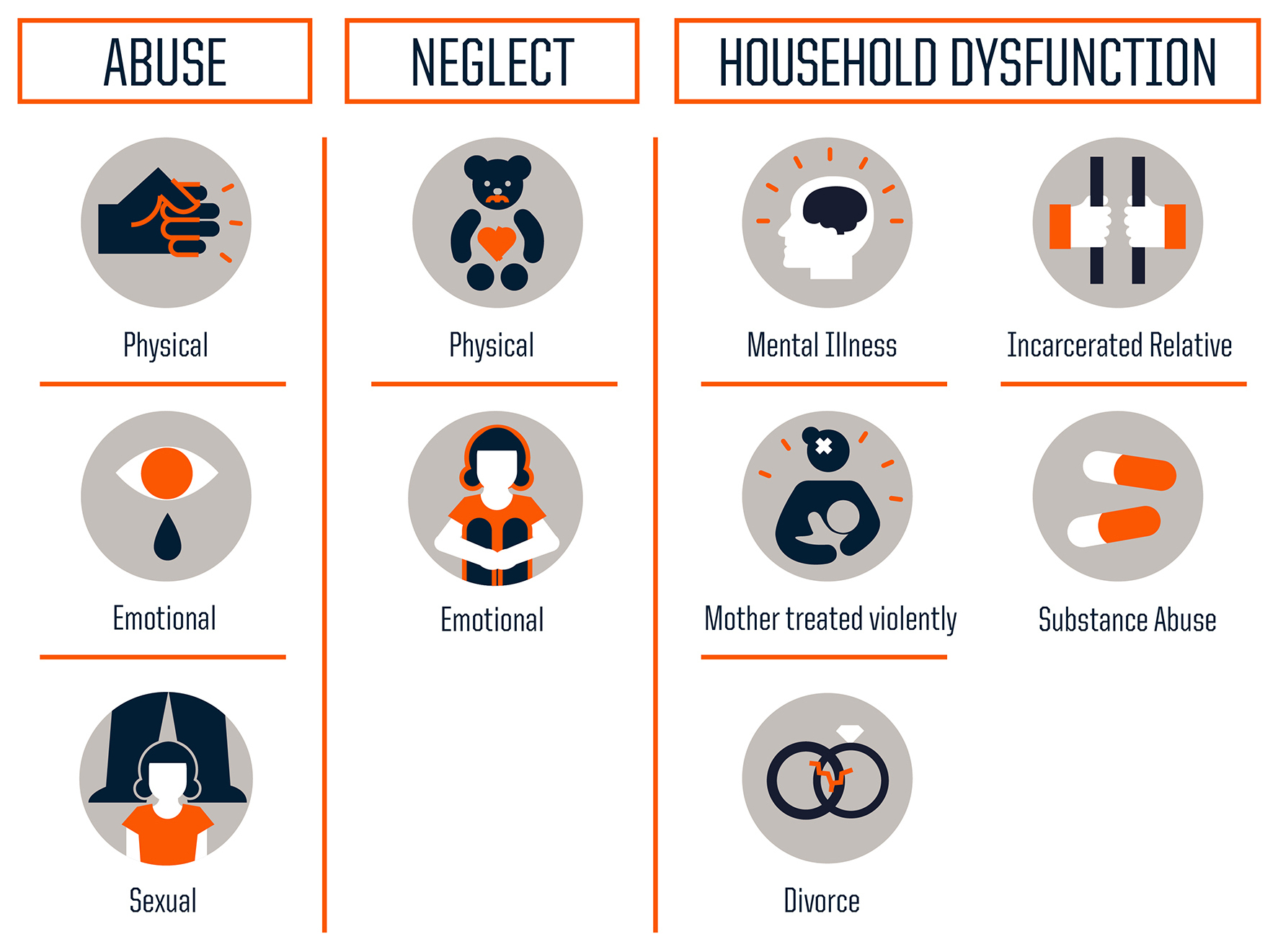
List of generalized events for adverse childhood experiences, which may be more common to occur in youth.

ACEs exposure is widespread globally, one study from the National Survey of Children's Health in the United States reported that approximately 68% of children 0–17 years old had experienced one or more ACEs. The impact of ACEs on children can manifest in difficulties focusing, self-regulating, trusting others, and can lead to negative cognitive effects. One study found that a child with 4 or more ACEs was 32 times more likely to be labeled with a behavioral or cognitive problem than a child with no ACEs.

Trauma-informed education refers to the specific use of knowledge about trauma and its expression to modify support for children to improve their developmental success. The National Child Traumatic Stress Network (NCTSN) describes a trauma-informed school system as a place where school community members work to provide trauma awareness, knowledge and skills to respond to potentially negative outcomes following traumatic stress. The NCTSN published a study that discussed the Attachment, Self-Regulation, and Competency (ARC) model, which other researchers have based their subsequent studies of trauma-informed education practices off of.

ACEs affect parts of the brain that involve memory, executive functioning, and attention. The parts of the brain and hormones that register fear and stress are in overdrive, whereas the prefrontal cortex, which regulates executive functions, is compromised. This impacts impulse control, focus, and critical thinking. The ability to process new information or collaborate with peers in school is eclipsed by the brain's necessity to survive the stress experienced in their environment. The inconsistency and instability of the home environment alters the many cognitive processes necessary for effective literacy acquisition.

Trauma-informed educators and clinicians can help remediate both young children and adolescents in school. With a knowledge and sensitivity of ACEs and their effects, proper and effective interventions can be implemented. This can also begin to create a stable environment in which children can learn and create stable attachments. Physical movement in the form of "brain energizers" can help regulate children's brains and alleviate stress when done 1–2 times during the school day. In one study, both behavior and literacy skills were assessed to see how effective the physical movement, or "brain energizers" were. Literacy scores for a classroom that used the brain energizers (which ranged from movement activities found online to other movement activities selected by the teacher and students), improved by 117% from beginning to end of year. In a school setting, the person who has experienced trauma and the person who is in the moment with the person trying to talk or write about it can connect, even when language fails to adequately describe the depth and complexity of the emotions felt. While there is an inherent discomfort in this, educators can embrace this discomfort and give children a space to express this, as best they can, in the classroom. Those who are able to develop more "resilience" might be able to function better in school, but this is dependent on the ratio of protective factors compared to ACEs.

==== Literacy ====
Building literacy skills can be impaired by the lack of literacy experiences in the home, missing parts of early-childhood education, or by actually altering brain development. There are techniques that can be employed by educators and clinicians to try and remediate the effects of the adverse experiences and move children forward in their literacy and educational development.

Young people who are refugees experience trauma whether they were part of the immigration process or were born in the country (where they currently attend school) where the family settled. During this resettlement phase many of the second-generation refugee child's problems come to light. The disruption in education and instability in the home, as a result of the family's journey, can lead to gaps in exposures to literacy in the home. Literacy experiences outside of school include parents reading with kids and borrowing or buying books for the home. Early-childhood literacy education includes explicit teaching of reading and writing skills, building phonological awareness, and academic vocabulary. Resettlement affects children's phonemic awareness and exposure to academic vocabulary since many families are unable to fully provide these out of school experiences. If the child was non-English speaking, then they are acquiring English as a new language. There already exists an achievement gap between native-English speakers in the United States and students who are learning English as their second (or third or fourth) language.

=== Social services ===
Social service providers—including welfare systems, housing authorities, homeless shelters, and domestic violence centers – are adopting trauma-informed approaches that help to prevent ACEs or minimize their impact. Utilizing tools that screen for trauma can help a social service worker direct their clients to interventions that meet their specific needs.

Housing authorities are also becoming trauma-informed. Supportive housing can sometimes recreate control and power dynamics associated with clients' early trauma. This can be reduced through trauma-informed practices, such as training staff to be respectful of clients' space by scheduling appointments and not letting themselves into clients' private spaces, and also understanding that an aggressive response may be trauma-related coping strategies.

A study in the UK looked at the views of young people exposed to ACEs on what support they needed from social services. The study grouped the findings into three categories: emotional support, practical support and service delivery. Emotional support included interacting with other young people for support and a sense solidarity, and supportive relationships with adults that are based on empathy, active listening and non-judgement. Practical support meant information about the available services, practical advice about everyday challenges and respite from these challenges through recreation. Young people expected service delivery to be continuous and dependable, and they needed flexibility and control over the support processes. The needs of young people with ACEs were found not to match the types of support they are offered.

=== Health care services ===
Screening for or talking about ACEs with parents and children can help to foster healthy physical and psychological development and can help doctors understand the circumstances that children and their parents are facing. By screening for ACEs in children, pediatric doctors and nurses can better understand behavioral problems. Some doctors have questioned whether some behaviors resulting in attention deficit hyperactivity disorder (ADHD) diagnoses are in fact reactions to trauma. Children who have experienced four or more ACEs are three times as likely to take ADHD medication when compared with children with less than four ACEs. Screening parents for their ACEs allows doctors to provide the appropriate support to parents who have experienced trauma, helping them to build resilience, foster attachment with their children, and prevent a family cycle of ACEs.

For people whose adverse childhood experiences were of abuse or neglect, cognitive behavioural therapy has been studied and shown to be effective.

=== Public health ===
Objections to screening for ACEs include the lack of randomized controlled trials that show that such measures can be used to actually improve health outcomes, the scale collapses items and has limited item coverage, there are no standard protocols for how to use the information gathered, and that revisiting negative childhood experiences could be emotionally traumatic. Other obstacles to adoption include that the technique is not taught in medical schools, is not billable, and the nature of the conversation makes some doctors personally uncomfortable. Some public health centers see ACEs as an important way (especially for mothers and children) to target health interventions for individuals during sensitive periods of development.

=== Resilience and resources ===
Resilience is the ability to adapt or cope in the face of significant adversity and threats such as health problems and stress experienced in the workplace or home. Resiliency can mediate the relationship of the effects of ACEs and health problems in adulthood. Being able to use emotional regulation skills such as cognitive reappraisal and mindfulness allows people to protect themselves from the potential negative effects of stressors. These skills can be taught to people but people living with ACEs score lower on measures of resilience and emotion regulation.

Resilience and access to other resources are protective factors against the effects of exposure to ACEs. Increasing resilience in children can help provide a buffer for those who have been exposed to trauma and have a higher ACE score. People and children who have fostered resiliency have the skills and abilities to embrace behaviors that can foster growth. In childhood, resiliency and attachment security can be fostered from having a caring adult in a child's life.

== Adverse Childhood Experiences Study ==
The Adverse Childhood Experiences Study was a collaborative effort between the US private healthcare organization Kaiser Permanente and the government-run Centers for Disease Control and Prevention to examine the long-term relationship between adverse childhood experiences and a variety of health behaviors and health outcomes in adulthood. An underlying thesis of the ACE Study is that stressful or traumatic childhood experiences have negative neurodevelopmental impacts that persist over the lifespan and increase the risk of a variety of health and social problems.

The ACE Study was based at Kaiser Permanente's San Diego Health Appraisal Clinic, a primary care clinic where each year more than 50,000 adult members of the Kaiser Permanente Health Maintenance Organization receive an annual, standardized, biopsychosocial medical examination. Each member who visits the Health Appraisal Clinic completes a standardized medical questionnaire. The medical history is completed by a health care provider who also performs a general physical examination and reviews laboratory test results with the patient. Appointments for most members are obtained by self-referral with 20% referred by their health care provider.

In the 1980s, the dropout rate of participants at Kaiser Permanente's obesity clinic in San Diego, California, was about 50%; despite all of the dropouts successfully losing weight under the program. Vincent Felitti, head of Kaiser Permanente's Department of Preventive Medicine in San Diego, conducted interviews with people who had left the program, and discovered that a majority of 286 people he interviewed had experienced childhood sexual abuse. The interview findings suggested to Felitti that weight gain might be a coping mechanism for depression, anxiety, and fear.

Felitti and Robert Anda from the Centers for Disease Control and Prevention (CDC) went on to survey childhood trauma experiences of over 17,000 Kaiser Permanente patient volunteers. The 17,337 participants were volunteers from approximately 26,000 consecutive Kaiser Permanente members. Participants were asked about different types of adverse childhood experiences that had been identified in earlier research literature: physical abuse, sexual abuse, emotional abuse, physical neglect, emotional neglect, exposure to domestic violence, household substance abuse, household mental illness, parental separation or divorce, and incarcerated household member.

This article incorporates text from this source, which is by David W Brown, Robert F Anda, Vincent J Felitti, Valerie J Edwards, Ann Marie Malarcher, Janet B Croft, and Wayne H Giles available under the CC BY 2.0 license.

=== Findings ===
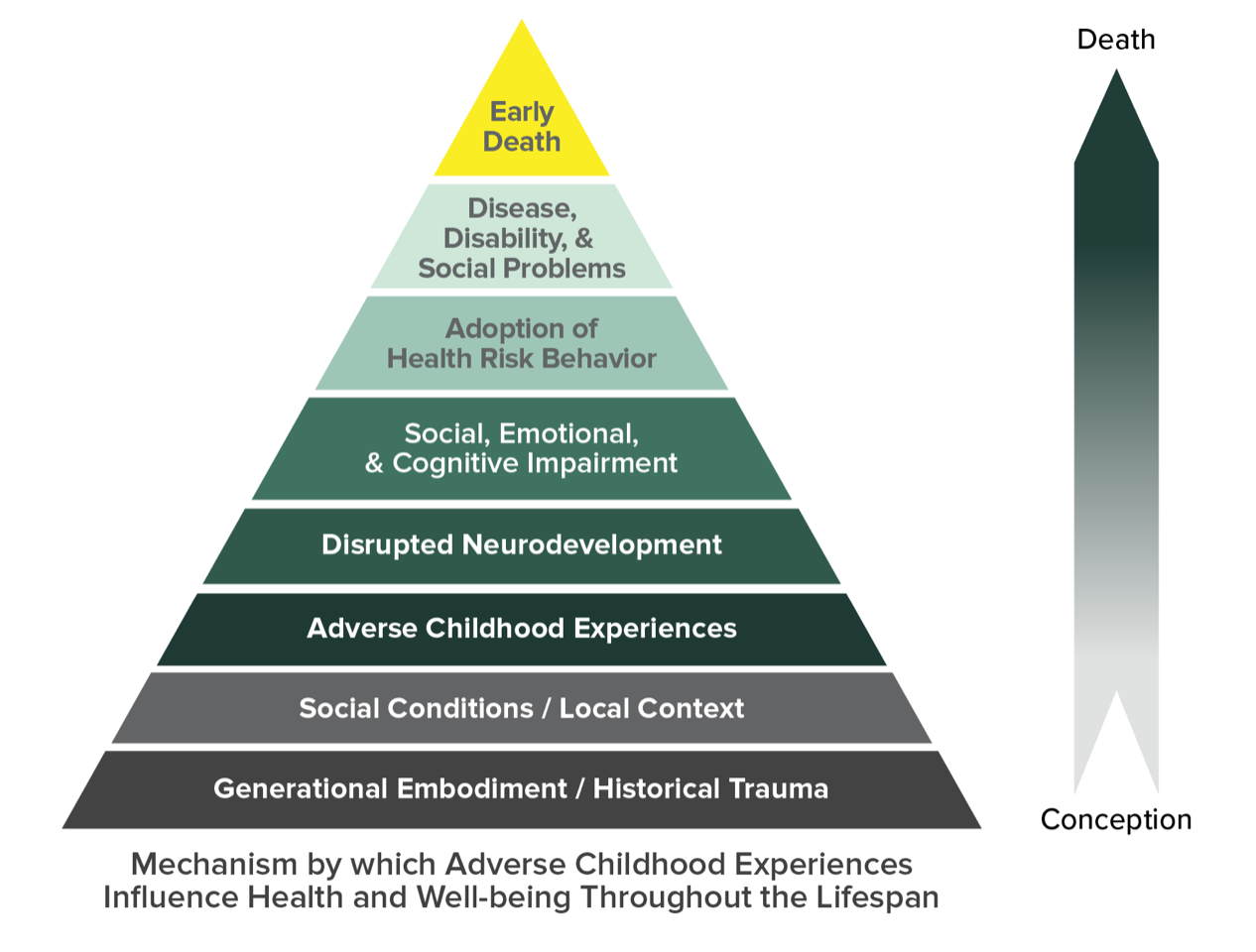
The ACE Pyramid represents the conceptual framework for the ACE Study, which has uncovered how adverse childhood experiences are strongly related to various risk factors for disease throughout the lifespan, according to the Centers for Disease Control and Prevention. Recent research suggests early death is not an inevitable outcome of ACEs. Weems and colleagues have proposed an alternative Pyramid that emphasizes potential resilience following ACEs.

According to the United States' Substance Abuse and Mental Health Services Administration, the ACE study found that:

- Adverse childhood experiences are common. For example, 28% of study participants reported physical abuse and 21% reported sexual abuse. Many also reported experiencing a divorce or parental separation, or having a parent with a mental and/or substance use disorder.
- Adverse childhood experiences often occur together. Almost 40% of the original sample reported two or more ACEs and 12.5% experienced four or more. Because ACEs occur in clusters, many subsequent studies have examined the cumulative effects of ACEs rather than the individual effects of each.
- Adverse childhood experiences have an exponential dose–response relationship with many health problems. As researchers followed participants over time, they discovered that a person's cumulative ACEs score has a strong, graded relationship to numerous health, social, and behavioral problems throughout their lifespan, including substance use disorders. Furthermore, many problems related to ACEs tend to be comorbid, or co-occurring.

About two-thirds of individuals reported at least one adverse childhood experience; 87% of individuals who reported one ACE reported at least one additional ACE. The number of ACEs was strongly associated with adulthood high-risk health behaviors such as smoking, alcohol and drug abuse, promiscuity, and severe obesity, which were correlated with ill health, including depression, heart disease, cancer, chronic lung disease and shortened lifespan. Compared to an ACE score of zero, having four adverse childhood experiences was associated with:

- a seven-fold (700%) increase in alcoholism
- an elevenfold (1100%) increase in using drugs
- a twofold (200%) increase in smoking
- a threefold (300%) increase in smoking before the age of 14
- a doubling risk of being diagnosed with cancer
- a four-fold increase in emphysema
- a 3.9-fold (390%) increase in risk of being diagnosed with COPD

An ACE score above six was associated with a 30-fold (3000%) increase in attempted suicide. The study also found that two-thirds of suicide attempts are directly linked to ACEs.

The effects of ACEs on lifestyle problems also depend on the types of ACEs experienced with studies reporting that individuals who experienced household substance abuse during childhood were 3.3 times as likely to abuse substances as adults compared to people with the same ACE score but who did not experience household substance abuse during childhood.

==== Other studies ====
One study conducted in the United Kingdom found that having four or more ACEs was associated with a twofold increase in alcoholism.

=== Subsequent surveys ===
The ACE Study has produced more than 50 articles that look at the prevalence and consequences of ACEs.

The original study questions have been used to develop a reduced-item screening questionnaire.

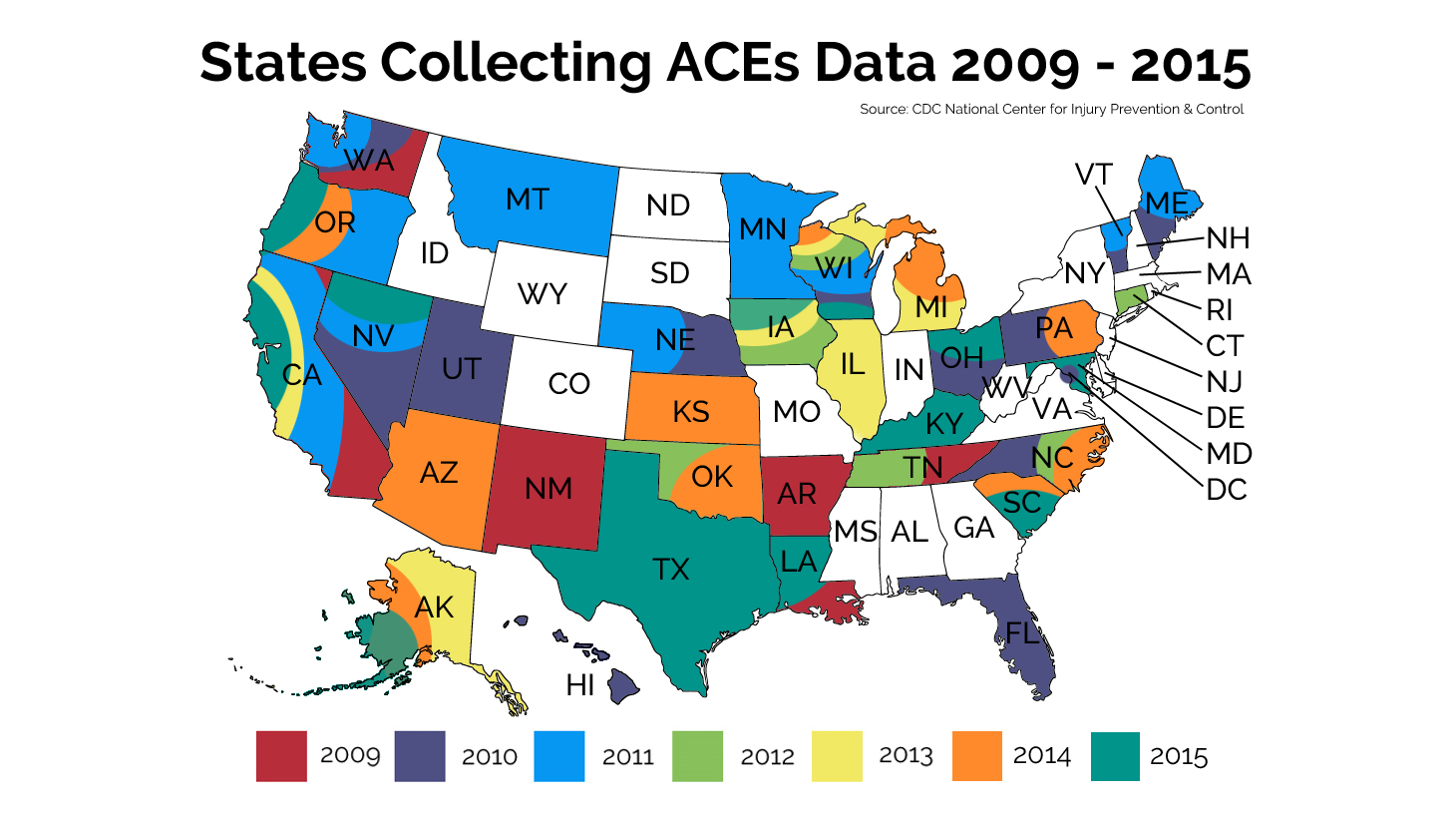
State ACEs Study surveys diagram color coded from the year 2009 to 2015

The Behavioral Risk Factor Surveillance System (BRFSS), which is run by the CDC, is an annual survey conducted in waves by groups of individual state and territory health departments. An expanded ACE survey instrument was included in several states found each state. Adverse childhood experiences were even more frequent in studies in urban Philadelphia and in a survey of young mothers (mostly younger than 19). Surveys of adverse childhood experiences have been conducted in multiple EU member countries.

A nationally representative study of Adverse Childhood Experiences (ACEs) in Mexico, conducted between 2021 and 2022, found that childhood adversity is highly prevalent among adults. Based on a sample of 13,781 Mexican adults across all 32 federal entities, 74.0% reported at least one ACE, while 40.98% reported four or more, with a mean ACE score of 2.49. The most common forms of adversity were emotional abuse (40.1%), emotional neglect (31.0%), and sexual abuse (28.8%), suggesting that psychological and relational trauma represent the predominant burden of childhood adversity in the Mexican population. These findings align with international evidence linking multiple ACE exposures to higher risks of depression, substance use, and chronic disease in adulthood, underscoring the need for trauma-informed public health and educational policies in Latin America.

== See also ==
- Complex post-traumatic stress disorder
- PTSD in children and adolescents
- Social determinants of health
- Stress in early childhood
  - Developmental impact of child neglect in early childhood
  - Early childhood trauma
