= Collaborative language systems =

Therapeutic approach

Collaborative language systems is a therapeutic approach largely based in contemporary hermeneutics, the study of interpretation as a way to produce understanding, while considering both context and cognition, as well as social constructionism. This approach involves a reciprocal relationship between both the therapist and client, through which the client works through his or her clinical problems using dialogical conversation with the therapist. The therapist and client work together, utilizing their own, individual knowledge and understanding of the issues, to conceptualize and illuminate the client’s problems and provide new context, meaning and comprehension to those problems based on the collaboration.

== Early sources ==
The theoretical approach known as collaborative language systems evolved from the traditional basis of collaborative therapy. Together, Harlene Anderson and Harry Goolishian took the core values incorporated into practiced therapeutic techniques involving reciprocal approaches toward the client-patient relationship and applied a cooperative understanding of the use of modern language and the role it plays in the formulation of ideas and perception, as well as Rogerian theory towards the therapeutic relationship. Goolishian and Anderson were later joined by Lynn Hoffman in expanding the application of their ideas. The approach corrected by the collective contributors was eventually expounded upon by Tom Andersen, who thrust the theories into a broader range of practice within the field family systems therapy.

== Creating collaborative therapy ==
Collaborative therapy emerged as a postmodernist concept rooted in philosophical principles as a way to challenge existing psychotherapeutic approaches. The basic foundations upon which collaborative language systems are based involve the formation of our understanding of events and situations based on the words used to describe them. Through narration and dialogue, it is theorized, we give meaning to situations. This meaning changes given the context of the conversation and how we choose to describe it. Collaborative therapists believe that knowledge and language, and thus the meaning each is given, are interdependent, dynamic processes that change through the exchange of information and ideas.

== Therapist–client relationship ==
Unlike traditional psychotherapy, the collaborative therapist plays a more active role in the therapist/patient relationship. As narration is essential to this form of therapy, the therapist constantly invites and facilitates the dialogue in order to sustain a constant exchange of ideas and experience. The therapist’s goal is to gain an understanding of the client’s problems through their narration by attempting to comprehend meaning from the perspective of the client. This process serves as a co-learning experience during which the therapist pays close attention to both what and how things are being said. Any comments or suggestions made by the therapist are used simply as a basis for continued conversation rather than an attempt at guidance or persuasion. The role of a collaborative therapist is to provide a context in which the client can begin to author, edit, and re-edit their own lives through the development and exchange of language. Despite the implicit implications regarding influence during this mutual exchange, the process most closely resembles the ethical practice of re-framing rather than coaching. The collaborative therapist believes that the open exchange of ideas and continuous dialogue will create opportunities for growth and transformation within the client.

== Application of Ideas ==
Collaborative language systems holds to certain core concepts during the conversational practice of therapy. Those concepts are:

- Conversational Partners
- Client Expertise
- "Not Knowing"
- Transparency
- Uncertainty
- "Everyday Ordinary Life"
- Mutual Transformation

These philosophies attempt to ensure, while working in tandem, the relationship between client and therapist grows in a mutually inclusive way, expounding upon the knowledge and understanding of situations by placing both the parties on the same level, providing the client the ability to share and explore their understanding openly and freely while setting and meeting their goals for therapy based on the end points they set for themselves. In this way, collaborative therapy builds upon the humanistic ideals with the client as the expert. It then builds upon the social constructionist view of identity through open dialogue. This theory involves the creation and understanding of problem an situations based upon the context and exchange in which they are formed. As the client and the therapist build their relationship through dialogical conversation, the context and meaning the client gives to the problems they are facing is altered as new perspectives and alternative viewpoints are offered by the therapist for consideration.

== See also ==
- Carl Rogers
- Humanistic psychology
- Narrative therapy
- Psychology
- Talk therapy
- Family therapy
