= Lynn Hoffman =

Lynn Hoffman (Paris, France, September 10, 1924; December 21, 2017) was an American social worker, family therapist, author and historian of family therapy. Her mother, Ruth Reeves was a painter, Art Deco textile designer and an originator of the American Index of Design. She graduated summa cum laude in English literature in 1946 from Radcliffe College, and after editing psychology works, she started MSW studies in 1969 and specialized in family therapy.

Originally a systems-strategic theorist and therapist, she became a proponent of post-systems/post-modern/collaborative approaches. She was an advisory editor of Family Process and Journal of Marital & Family Therapy. Until her retirement in 2000, she had for many years been on the faculty of the Ackerman Institute and the Smith College School of Social Work. She spent her last years as a lecturer at Saint Joseph College in West Hartford, Connecticut.

== Bibliography ==
- Haley, J. & Hoffman, L. (1967; 1994). Techniques of family therapy. New York: Basic Books. (1994 printing – Northvale, NJ: Aronson.)
- Hoffman, L. (1981). Foundations of Family Therapy: A Conceptual Framework for Systems Change. New York: Basic Books.
- Hoffman, L. (1985). "Beyond power and control: Toward a "second order" family systems therapy". Family Systems Medicine. 3 (4): 381–396. doi:10.1037/h0089674.
- Hoffman, L. (1990). "Constructing Realities: An Art of Lenses". Family Process. 29 (1): 1–12. doi:10.1111/j.1545-5300.1990.00001.x. PMID 2178969.
- Hoffman, L. (1991). "A reflective stance for family therapists". Journal of Strategic and Systemic Therapies. 10: 4–17. doi:10.1521/jsst.1991.10.3-4.4.
- Hoffman, L. (1993). Exchanging Voices: A Collaborative Approach to Family Therapy. London: Karnac Books.
- Hoffman, L. (1998). "Setting aside the model in family therapy". Journal of Marital & Family Therapy. 24 (2): 145–156. doi:10.1111/j.1752-0606.1998.tb01071.x. PMID 9583054.
- Hoffman, L. (2002). Family Therapy: An Intimate History. New York: W.W. Norton & Co.
- Hoffman, L. (2007). The art of "withness": A new bright edge. In H. Anderson & D. Gehart (Eds.), Collaborative therapy: Relationships and conversations that make a difference (pp. 63–79). New York, NY: Taylor & Francis Group.

== See also ==
- Harlene Anderson
- Jay Haley
