= Adverse childhood experiences among Hispanic and Latino Americans =

Adverse childhood experiences (ACEs) are identified as serious and traumatizing experiences, such as abuse, neglect, exposure to violence, substance use, and other harmful events or situations that occur within a child's household or environment. Unfortunately, exposure to ACEs within the child's community is all too common in low-income households and neighborhoods, with close to 43% of children in the United States (U.S.) living in low-income families. ACEs were first identified by the Centers for Disease Control and Prevention (CDC) and Kaiser Permanente's Adverse Childhood Experiences Study conducted from 1995 to 1997, where ACEs were examined and correlated with later-life well-being. With one in four children experiencing or witnessing a potentially traumatic event, children who grow up in an unsafe environment are at risk for developing adverse health outcomes, affecting brain development, immune systems, and regulatory systems.

Further research on ACEs determined that children who experience them are more likely than their similar-aged peers to experience challenges in their biological, emotional, social, and cognitive functioning. Also, children who have experienced an ACE are at higher risk of being re-traumatized or suffering multiple ACEs. The amount and types of ACEs can cause significant negative impacts and increase the risk of internalizing and externalizing in children.

To date, there is still limited research on how ACEs impact Latino children. As of 2019, there were nearly 61 million Latino individuals in the U.S. With the Latino population becoming one of the largest minority groups within the U.S., it is crucial to examine how ACEs negatively impact Latino children's development and develop ways to reduce the rate at which ACEs are experienced in this population.

== Latino Americans Trauma Experiences ==
When it comes to trauma, Latino children are at higher risk, almost twice as much, than their white peers of experiencing ACEs. Also, they are at higher risk of developing posttraumatic stress disorder (PTSD) or PTSD symptoms due to increased challenges that these families face. Challenges include immigration, discrimination, violence, low socioeconomic status (SES), alcohol and substance use. Many U.S.-born Latino children have a foreign-born parent who is considered an unauthorized immigrant, presenting many challenges for the family. For children who have migrated to the U.S. with their families are at higher risk of experiencing traumatic events, as they tend to experience trauma in their home country and during their migration and settlement to the U.S. Children who have undocumented parents, their chances of ACEs are further elevated since they may witness their parents being arrested, detained, or deported for being undocumented. With the increased stress that Latino families face because of the described challenges, there is a greater risk of gang involvement, exposure to substance use, mental health problems, harmful parenting practices, and medical difficulties.

Latino parents who have migrated to the U.S. tend to have less education and do not speak or understand English fluently. These barriers reduce their chances of finding stable and well-paying jobs, increasing the risk of low SES among this population. With the increased amount of barriers with language, education, and low SES, Latino families' stress may increase as they cannot access resources such as food assistance, health coverage, and mental health support, thereby increasing their likelihood of ACEs. There is minimal research on how ACEs impact children from Latino families because many of them may go unreported in fear of deportation or separation from the children.

Intimate and domestic violence is another example of an ACE that many Latino families face. Within this population, gender roles are clearly defined and implemented within the family dynamic. It is culturally expected that men present as powerful and dominant while women are submissive and self-sacrificing. Due to these gender roles and the transmission of these cultural roles, women tend to give in to their partner's power and endure various forms of violence. For many Latino women, incidents of domestic violence go unreported due to fear of affecting family cohesion, police involvement, deportation, and feelings of shame, embarrassment and criticism that they may endure from the extended family and community. A longitudinal study showed that 45% of females and 50% of males reported having witnessed physical violence between their parents during their childhood. With increased domestic violence observed in the home, Latino children are more likely to express or develop unhealthy coping skills and continue the transmission of violence in their own relationships.

Latino children who experience ACEs such as incarceration, maltreatment, and interpersonal trauma are at heightened risk and susceptibility for substance use disorders (SUDs) in later life. Research suggests that Latino children who experience household incarceration are at risk of increased binge drinking, marijuana use, and negative substance use consequences in emerging adulthood. Those who do not experience household incarceration but experience accumulative ACEs are at increased odds of cigarette smoking. Latino children who experience maltreatment are 23% more likely to have problematic alcohol use in adulthood.

== Protective Factors of ACEs ==
Protective factors are the variables within an individual or their community that help promote their well-being against adversity. Although Latino families are at risk of experiencing more ACEs, research suggests that Latino cultural values can be protective factors to ACEs and long-term trauma. Cultural values are the strong beliefs, traditions, and values that Latino holds firmly within their culture. Cultural values include the traditional values of respect, religion, familial, and gender roles. These cultural values are held in high regard in Latino culture and endorsed at a young age; without these values, families can experience increased levels of dysfunction. Parents must transmit their children's cultural values to continue the culture. Children also learn about the culture's values through socialization with extended family members.

Within the Latino population, family cohesion is embedded in the traditional cultural value known as familism. In Latino culture, familism refers to the emotional bonding and supportiveness between family members, which leads to positive family functioning. Within Latino culture, families must stick together and utilize family, both immediate and extended, as a support system, which ensures the children stay physically and psychologically healthy through social interactions and secure attachments with their family members. With an increased amount of support, the risk of parental stress experienced by Latino parents can be minimized, reducing the chances of ACE exposure. Family cohesion can be identified as a protective factor. For example, one study found that strong familial orientation among Latino families contributed to higher school success in Latino children.

Research suggests that high family cohesion minimizes the risk of exposure to violence and negative mental health outcomes in adolescence and adulthood. Still, for some Latino families, family cohesion is not as vital, which can be detrimental to the family dynamic when ACEs are present. Those who do not have substantial cohesion levels in their environments are more likely to experience negative mental health outcomes such as depression, anxiety, and psychotic symptoms. ACEs can lead to increased emotional and psychological distress in parents, which can negatively affect family cohesion. For this reason, it is essential to see how ACEs negatively impact family cohesion within the Latino population.
