= Lebow =

Lebow, also LeBow, is a surname. Notable people with the surname include:

- Bennett S. LeBow, American businessman and philanthropist
  - Bennett S. LeBow College of Business
- Fred Lebow (1932–1994), American runner, race director, and founder of the New York City Marathon
- Fredric Lebow, American screenwriter
- Jay Lebow (born 1948), American family psychologist
- Richard Ned Lebow (born 1942), American political scientist
- Theo Lebow (born 1986), American tenor
