= Ackerman Institute for the Family =

The Ackerman Institute for the Family is a training institute for family and couple therapy. The Institute was founded in 1960, in New York City, by Nathan Ackerman, who became its first president and from whom the Institute derives its name. It is located at 936 Broadway, New York City.

Ackerman Institute's function is to provide:

- Couple and family therapy services through its on-site Clinic (licensed by the State of New York Office of Mental Health).
- Training programs for mental health and other professionals on-site, in community settings and internationally.
- Research initiatives that focus on the development of new treatment models and training techniques.

== History ==
Dr. Nathan W. Ackerman founded the Ackerman Institute for the Family in 1960. Although trained as a classical analyst, Dr. Ackerman broke with this approach after World War II when he began to experiment with seeing patients and their families in a group. He published, taught and showed movies demonstrating this new method, pioneering not only a new type of therapy, but also the tradition of the audiovisual documentation of clinical work that became one of the cornerstones of family therapy training. In 1960, a group of families treated by Dr. Ackerman established a non-profit institute to allow him to expand his training activities.

In 1967, Donald Bloch became the Ackerman Institute's second director. Under his leadership, the Institute inaugurated an expanded clinical training program, developed a large family therapy clinic housed at the Institute and initiated a series of projects aimed at creating new approaches to particularly difficult clinical problems.

In 1970, Kitty LaPerriere became the Institute’s first Director of Training. LaPerriere established the tradition of training therapists together in groups, allowing students to learn from each other. Students enrolled in the clinical externship record their counseling sessions with families, then use the documentation to discuss their techniques with faculty members and classmates.

== Clinic ==
The Ackerman Institute maintains its Clinic, which is licensed by the New York State Office of Mental Health. The Ackerman Clinic serves every kind of family, including traditional nuclear families, single parent families, gay families, transgender families, intergenerational families, and stepfamilies.

== Notable faculty ==
Therapists who have taught, or currently teach at the Institute include: Nathan Ackerman, Lois Braverman, Donald Bloch, Martha Edwards, Virginia Goldner, Judy Grossman, Lynn Hoffman, Evan Imber-Black, Laurie Kaplan, Elana Katz, Kitty LaPerriere, Catherine Lewis, Jean Malpas, Peggy Papp, Peggy Penn, Constance Scharf, Michele Scheinkman, Marcia Sheinberg, Susan Shimmerlik, Olga Silverstein, Sippio Small, Peter Steinglass, Marcia Stern, Judy Stern-Peck, Fiona True, Gillian Walker, thandiwe Dee Watt-Jones, and Hinda Winawer.

== See also ==
- Couples therapy
- Family therapy
- Family Process (journal)
- Mental Research Institute
