= Peggy Papp =

American family therapist

Peggy Papp (February 20, 1923 – November 13, 2021) was an American family therapist and clinical social worker who pioneered research on the role gender plays in depression. Papp was a senior faculty member of the Ackerman Institute for the Family in New York City for over 50 years. Her work on gender and depression has been widely lauded. Papp received the American Association for Marriage and Family Therapy's Lifetime Achievement Award in 1991 and the University of Utah Distinguished Alumni Award in 2003.

== Early life and education ==
Papp was born as Peggy Marie Bennion in Salt Lake City, Utah in 1923. Papp's mother, Vera Weiler Bennion, married Heber Bennion Jr. in Salt Lake City in 1916. Papp's father was a rancher and politician who served as the Utah secretary of state for two terms. Her parents were Mormon homesteaders. Papp spent most of her childhood in Manila, UT on her family's ranch.

Papp graduated from the University of Utah in 1950. She earned dual Bachelor of Arts degrees, one in Journalism and the other in Drama. In the 1960s, she earned a Master of Arts in Social Work from Hunter College in New York, NY.

== Career in Hollywood and theater ==
Papp's love of the theater incentivized her to move to Hollywood to begin her career. She wrote feature articles for the Salt Lake Tribune and she freelanced for movie magazines. These experiences led Papp to develop a series called "I Had a Date With..." In this series, Papp wrote about the dates she had with Hollywood's most prominent leading men, including Burt Lancaster, Rex Harrison, and Peter Lawford.

After deciding she would rather act than write, Papp moved to New York and attended the Academy of Dramatic Arts.

== Work and publications ==
In the 1960s, Papp gave up acting to become a therapist.

Papp founded and directed a new model for treating adolescents that focused on family relationships. She based her model on the idea that families have implicit belief systems that govern their values and expectations.

Papp also founded the Gender and Depression Project, where she highlighted how gender difference shaped relationship dynamics. The Gender and Depression Project offered insights into the different reasons men and women develop depression. Papp's work specifically focused on how women and men cope with depression differently, and how taking care of a depressed spouse differs depending on the gender of that spouse.

Papp's best-known publication is her collaboration on The Women's Project with Betty Carter, Olga Silverstein, and Marianne Walters. She also wrote three other books: The Process of Change (1983); The Invisible Web: Gender Patterns in Family Relationships (1988); and Couples on the Fault Line: New Directions for Therapists (2002).

Papp presented her work in all 50 states and in 30 countries, including countries in Europe and Japan, Argentina, Israel, Hong Kong, and Turkey.

== Personal life ==
Papp met and married Joseph Papp, an American producer and director, while performing in Death of a Salesman in New York in 1951. Together, they had a son, Anthony Papp, and a daughter, Miranda Papp Adani.
