= Marianne Walters =

American feminist therapist

Marianne Walters (1930 – February 21, 2006) was an American therapist. A pioneer in the field of feminist-oriented family therapy, Walters founded the Family Therapy Practice Center in Washington, D.C.

== Early life and education ==
Marianne Lichtenstein Walters was born in Washington, DC in 1930. Walters' mother emigrated to the United States from Russia, and met Walters' father at a meeting of the Young Person's Socialist League.

Walters was, for a brief amount of time, a member of the Communist Party. At age 17–18, she was a delegate to an international youth and student congress in Prague, where Paul Robeson spoke.

She graduated from Woodrow Wilson High School and received her bachelor's degree in social work from the University of California at Berkeley in 1952 and her MSW from the University of Illinois in 1954.

== Early career ==
Throughout the 1960s, Walters was involved in civil rights marches, war protests, abortion rights sit-ins and gay rights demonstrations. She also worked with the Southern Christian Leadership Conference during the 1968 Poor People's March on Washington, helping organize Resurrection City, a tent city on the Washington Mall.

From 1963 to 1966, Walters was chief social worker for a pilot project sponsored by the Center for Youth and Community Studies at Howard University, and from 1966 to 1980 she was a family therapist in Philadelphia. From 1975 to 1980, she served as executive director of the Family Therapy Training Center at the Philadelphia Child Guidance Clinic, where she was known for her work with single-parent, low-income families.

== Feminist family therapy and the Family Therapy Practice Center ==
In 1978, Walters founded the Women's Project in Family Therapy alongside colleagues Betty Carter, Peggy Papp, and Olga Silverstein. According to Psychotherapy Networker, the Project:

"was a combination feminist think tank and SWAT team, which, in public workshops all over the country, challenged the underlying sexism in some of the most basic notions of family therapy."

Then, in 1980, she founded the Family Therapy Practice Center. It was one of the first family clinics in the country to be run by a woman. The Center trains therapists and counselors, administers research projects, and works with area family service agencies such as a local shelter for abused and runaway youth. The center also provides family therapy services to underserved populations in the area.

Walters is considered a pioneer of feminist family therapy, which, according to her, takes into account the influence of gender roles influence family dynamics and relationships, as well as the relationship between family and society.

== Personal life ==
Walters met Joseph Hart Walters while at the University of California at Berkeley, and the pair married in 1950. Their marriage ended in divorce; the couple had three daughters: Lisa, Suzanna, and Pamela. Marianne Walters died of lung cancer on February 21, 2006 in Washington, D.C.

== Works ==
Walters was the author of numerous articles and monographs, and the editor of several books.

=== Books ===
- The Invisible Web: Gender Patterns in Family Relationships (1988) New York: Guilford [with Women's Project colleagues]
