= Externalization (psychology) =

Concept in Freudian psychology

Externalization is a term used in psychoanalytic theory which describes the tendency to project one's internal states onto the outside world. It is generally regarded as an unconscious defense mechanism, thus the person is unaware they are doing it. Externalization takes on a different meaning in narrative therapy, where the client is encouraged to externalize a problem in order to gain a new perspective on it.

This concept originally stems from Freud's theory of projection, proposed in the early 20th century, and was regarded as one of his primary defense mechanisms. Compared to projection, externalization carries a broader and more generalized significance. Over years of evolution and interdisciplinary integration, externalization has come to be seen as a process through which humans engage with, interact with, and influence the external world. In this broader interpretation, externalization is often viewed as a conscious process. By the late 20th century, externalization was successfully incorporated into narrative therapy, where it achieved notable impact. In the early 21st century, research in neuroscience also explored how externalization affects human behavior—particularly behaviors related to danger, arousal, and aggression. These studies confirmed a connection between externalization processes and various forms of neurological dysfunction.

== Psychoanalysis ==
In Freudian psychology, externalization (or externalisation) is a defense mechanism by which an individual projects their own internal characteristics onto the outside world, particularly onto other people. For example, a patient who is overly argumentative might instead perceive others as argumentative and themselves as blameless.

Initially, externalization can be traced back to projection theory. In the early stages of theoretical development, Sigmund Freud did not systematically introduce the term "externalization" as a distinct phrase from projection, but rather generally regarded the definitions of the two as being consistent. Instead, it was established through a series of subsequent studies based on his projection theory. Freud’s interpretation of this mechanism is vividly illustrated in the famous case of Daniel Paul Schreber, whose delusional experiences involved projecting inner anxiety into divine persecution, leading to somatic symptoms—a process that closely supports Freud’s description of projection.

After Freud generally introduced the concept of externalization, it attracted significant attention from subsequent psychoanalysts. In the mid-20th century, psychologist Melanie Klein conducted a series of experiments to explore the characteristics of this concept, providing a more detailed and specific interpretation that deepened the understanding of the dynamic relationship between internalization and externalization. First, through studying how infants use internalization and projection to cope with anxiety, she introduced the concepts of "paranoid-schizoid position" and "depressive position." The former emphasizes that infants follow a consistent pattern when externalizing and projecting emotions, thus simplifying their feelings into two "good" and "bad" objects, and then externalize these feelings to the world. The latter represents a deeper stage in which children begin to recognize and integrate these split parts of the self, understanding that both good and bad objects can coexist within the self, thus forming a more complete sense of self-identity. Additionally, Klein introduced the important theory of “projective identification”, which highlights that when individuals externalize their emotions and feelings, they not only perceive the person being projected onto as sharing the same emotions but also unconsciously attempt to force others to believe and manifest those feelings. Severe form of externalization is considered to be a possible factor in the process of inducing schizophrenia.

Like other defense mechanisms, externalization can be a protection against anxiety and is, therefore, part of a healthy, normally functioning mind. However, if taken to excess, it can lead to the development of a neurosis. To illustrate Klein’s stronger version of externalization: a person filled with resentment toward life might externalize this negativity through specific behaviors, ultimately causing those around them to adopt a similarly pessimistic worldview—thereby reinforcing and reshaping the emotional climate.

From a psychoanalytic perspective, the appearing of externalization follows a structured process. First, individuals experience discomfort or distress triggered by an external factor. When this internal unease persists, they begin attributing it to external sources. Subconsciously, they assume others must feel the same way as a means of emotional reassurance. Eventually, through behavioral interactions, these attributions are reinforced and realized, completing the process of emotional and cognitive externalization.

== Social and Developmental Psychology ==
The social psychological understanding of externalization differs somewhat from that of psychoanalysis. In early research, Erving Goffman used theatrical metaphors to illustrate how individuals present themselves in daily interactions with the world. He emphasized that the "self" is not a fixed internal essence but rather a product of performance. His work was among the earliest to connect conscious acts of externalization with the ways individuals shape their personal image and influence the social structures around them. Building upon this, Peter Berger and Thomas Luckmann further developed the concept in their 1966 study. They proposed that reality is constructed through communication, and externalization is a continuous process by which this construction occurs. In this process, individuals express their subjective meanings through actions, language, and institutions, thereby integrating them into the fabric of the social world. More specifically, human activities actively shape and project reality, which is then objectified and internalized into the broader social order. Compared to the psychoanalytic approach, which focuses on intrapsychic mechanisms, the social psychological perspective places greater emphasis on how individuals articulate their subjective perceptions and emotions—and, through this expression, actively transform social reality. In short, externalization here refers to how people modify social structures through their actions.

A classic example that illustrates this is the classroom scenario. In a classroom, teachers and students engage in behaviours like raising hands or assigning homework, which follow socially constructed—rather than natural—rules. Through these actions, individuals externalize subjective meanings (e.g., the teacher's identity as a “knowledge authority”), thereby shaping and maintaining social reality.

Around the same period, developmental psychology also offered a new layer of understanding of externalization. Echoing the views of social psychology, the developmental school—represented by the work of Erik Erikson—similarly regarded externalization as a constructive and functional mechanism. It allows individuals to project their inner world outward through behavior, thereby facilitating mutual understanding, communication, and influence with the external environment. Erikson approached the concept from a more detailed and expansive perspective. His studies on how adolescents externalize internal conflicts into outward rebellious behaviors during puberty are particularly emblematic of his understanding of the concept.

As a result, with the later contributions of both social and developmental psychology, externalization gradually moved beyond being viewed merely as a pathological defense mechanism. Instead, it came to be understood and accepted as a vital factor in human social development—one that enables the self to navigate and respond to the complexities of social and environmental challenges through cognition and emotional expression.

== Narrative therapy ==
Narrative therapy offers another perspective on the practical role of externalization. In this approach, externalization plays a significant role as a discursive and linguistic practice, helping patients engage in the therapeutic process. This method requires the individual receiving therapy to have a certain degree of self-identity and interaction with cultural narratives, allowing them to actively participate in the dialogue and truly separate themselves from their problems. It enables patients to alleviate anxiety to varying degrees, improve mental health, and explore different forms of social constructions, thereby creating more diverse narrative possibilities and broadening opportunities for life choices.

Michael White states that the problem of the client is externalized, to alter the client's point of view.

== Neuroscience of externalization ==
Problems with self-regulation, including impulsivity, violence, sensation-seeking, and rule-breaking, are indicative of an externalizing risk pathway. A discrepancy exists between bottom-up reward-related circuitry, such as the ventral striatum, and top-down inhibitory control circuitry, which is located in the prefrontal cortex, linking externalizing behaviors. Externalization is often related to substance use disorders. In particular, alcohol use disorder is one of disorders that much externalization research has been dedicated to. Often, issues within the externalizing risk pathway, namely vulnerabilities in self-regulation, may impact the development of alcohol use disorder differently across stages of the addiction cycle. Likewise, adolescent marijuana use has been linked to an externalizing pathway that highlights aggressive and delinquent behavior. Another type of disorder that is linked to the externalizing pathway is Antisocial Personality Disorder due to its tendency to relate by lack of constraint. Much research has examined the similarities of antisocial personality disorder and substance use disorder in relation to externalizing behaviors.

== Criticism ==
Critiques of externalization are generally approached from an overarching perspective. One common concern is using externalization as a defense mechanism diminishes the role of internalization, potentially neglecting the complexity of introspective work. This could lead to clients in therapeutic settings (particularly narrative therapy) avoiding the critical introspection necessary for deep healing.

In neuroscience, a key concern is that attributing externalization behaviors mainly to neurobiological mechanisms may promote biological determinism, overlooking the environmental and social factors that also play a crucial role in human behavior.

== See also ==
- Internalization
