= Developmental impact of child neglect in early childhood =

Child neglect, often overlooked, is the most common form of child maltreatment. Most perpetrators of child abuse and neglect are the parents themselves. A total of 79.4% of the perpetrators of abused and neglected children are the parents of the victims, and of those 79.4% parents, 61% exclusively neglect their children. The physical, emotional, and cognitive developmental impacts from early childhood neglect can be detrimental, as the effects from the neglect can carry on into adulthood.

== Childhood ==
=== Physical health development ===
Research has shown that by the time a child reaches the age of six, if they have experienced adverse childhood experiences (ACEs), such as neglect, their chances of having overall poor physical health increases by two-fold. Exposure to ACEs, which exert effect by increasing an individual exposure to toxic stress during key periods of development, has also been linked to higher risks of chronic diseases, respiratory and heart disease, cancer and suicide.

More specifically, improper prenatal care increases the risk of premature births and complications during delivery. This can include prenatal neglect, such as the fetal exposure to controlled substances which result in withdrawal symptoms or the presence of the substance in the newborn. Fetal exposure to substances, especially those that can easily cross the placenta such as nicotine and cocaine, can affect the development of the fetus's nervous system and thus, have been linked to long-lasting effects on brain structure and function. Further, maltreatment and neglect during infancy has been linked to a variety of physical development issues, including poor growth and insufficient brain and neuronal development. Medical neglect can lead to a number of long-term physical consequences such as permanent loss of hearing from ear infections, vision impairment from strabismus, and chronic respiratory issues from untreated pneumonia.

A common outcome of neglect is non-organic failure to thrive in infants and children. "Non-organic" simply means that the child's failure to thrive cannot be explained by an organic cause, such as an illness or deficiency. The term "failure to thrive" refers to an abnormal pattern of weight gain or weight loss, or experiencing insufficient growth patterns in accordance with a child's age and developmental stage. These conditions can arise when a child does not receive adequate nutrition or necessary medical attention required for proper physical growth and development. Neglect can play a role in non-organic failure to thrive because children who experience neglect are often malnourished, not receiving proper nutrients, which hinders their physical growth and development. The most common symptoms of non-organic failure to thrive are insufficient weight gain or growth in height, and these common symptoms can affect a child over their life course by setting them back in weight class and can hinder their overall growth. Other symptoms of failure to thrive include symptoms such as iron deficiency or anemia, low insulin, dry or cracked skin, thin hair growth, pasty skin, and more. In more extreme cases, non-organic failure to thrive can affect a child over their whole life course by actually damaging their cognitive development and immune system due to insufficient calorie intake or lack of medical attention, making the child much more likely to miss developmental milestones and much more prone to illness even later into adulthood.

=== Cognitive development ===
==== Social and emotional development ====
A developing child requires proper nutrition, protection, and regulation for healthy attachment. About 80% of neglected children display attachment disorder symptoms and eventually form insecure attachments to their caregivers as a result of caregivers' unresponsive interactions. This disturbed attachment to their primary caregiver alters future relationships with peers by becoming emotional and physically isolated from others reducing the likelihood of forming emotional connections. Moreover, as a result of their past maltreatment, neglected children feel that forming intimate relationships with others loses their control in life and exposes them by increasing their vulnerability. A number of aspects may create a neglectful environment; however, substance abuse in parents is a common example. With parents who are addicted to drugs, children's basic needs are not met when parents are attempting to obtain their drugs as well as when they take them. This can create a weak parent–child relationship that is more likely to result in insecure attachment relationships as well as poor parenting practices. This example is one of many scenarios where neglect can affect a child's development, especially in how they form relationships with others.

Neglected children demonstrate lack of emotional regulation, understanding emotional expressions by others, and difficulty in distinguishing emotions. When posed with problem-solving tasks, neglected children reacted with anger and frustration, and were less enthusiastic with completing a new task. Neglected children often have distressing memories of their past to which they regulate their emotions by suppressing them.

==== Academic development ====
Neuroimaging studies using magnetic resonance imaging have shown that the brain structure of a neglected child is significantly altered. The overall cerebral volume of the brain of a neglected child is significantly diminished, with a reduced midsagittal area of the corpus callosum, and the ventricular system is enlarged thereby resulting in decreased cognitive growth, development, and functioning. Further studies show that neglected children have poor cerebral hemisphere integration and underdevelopment of the orbitofrontal cortex region which affects the child’s social skills.

Studies on academic progress in neglected children have indicated that these children may experience a drop in their academic performance. Children who have experienced neglect are more likely to have attention deficits and poorer academic achievements. Further, neglect in early childhood can result in a rise in stress levels in the child. Elevated stress levels from neglect can lead to a release of higher levels of cortisol causing damage to the hippocampus which can affects a child’s learning and memory.

A study examining the motor, language, and cognitive development of neglected children showed that the scores from the Bayley Scales of Infant Development were significantly lower than non-maltreated children. Neglected children displayed poor self-control and a lack of creativity in solving problems. Standardized tests become a challenge for neglected children as they perform poorly on intellectual functioning and academic achievement. Further, neglected children perform significantly poorer on IQ tests than non-maltreated children.

==== Protective factors ====
Preclinical and clinical data show that long-term effects of early-life stress can be blunted by the availability of positive supports and subsequent caregiving experiences. Clinical studies have shown that the availability of a caregiver, who is present and caring, is a factor that differentiates abused children with positive developmental outcomes versus those with negative outcomes. Age of onset may be another factor dictating the severity of symptoms, with some studies reporting that abuse that takes place during earlier stages of childhood development is associated with negative outcomes later on in life. Children who experience traumatic episodes early in life are at increased risk of developing major depressive disorder. However that risk may be attenuated by the presence of a functional polymorphism in the promoter region of the serotonin transporter gene 5HTTLPR, which can manifest in two different types of alleles, the "short" subtype and the "long" subtype, carriers of the long/long allele subtype were resistant to developing depression in response to early life trauma.

=== Biological mechanisms ===
Activation of the LHPA axis triggers the hypothalamus to secrete corticotrophin-releasing hormone (CRH); CRH stimulates the release of adrenocorticotrophic hormone (ACTH) by binding to CRH receptors in the anterior pituitary. ACTH in turn binds to G protein-coupled receptors in the adrenal cortex, especially in the zona fasciculata of the adrenal glands. Elevated central CRH and CRF occurs with the onset of trauma. While this CRF elevation persists into adulthood, initial elevations of ACTH and cortisol levels become attenuated with chronic exposure to elevated CRH (a.k.a. CRF). High CRH in turn causes adaptive down-regulation of pituitary CRH and neural CRF receptors after trauma onset. The long-term consequence of early trauma experiences and elevated CRF resets the regulation of the LHPA axis so that ACTH and cortisol secretions are set at lower 24-hour levels during baseline and non-stressful conditions. Cross-sectional studies show that trauma in infant primates and very young or prepubertal children living in orphanages show low morning and daytime cortisol production, suggesting that prepubertal children may be more sensitive to negative feedback control mechanisms for cortisol output than older school-age children who show higher cortisol levels.

Research involving humans has similarly demonstrated that negative life events can disrupt the body's regulation of oxytocin. Decreased levels of oxytocin have been found in women exposed to early maltreatment—a relationship that was shown to be especially strong when the form of maltreatment was emotional abuse.

== Long-term consequences ==
=== Adolescence & adulthood ===
==== Physical health development ====
Children who experience maltreatment may be at greater risk for chronic conditions such as cardiovascular problems (e.g. heart attack, hypertension), endocrine dysfunction (e.g. diabetes), neurologic and vision changes (stroke, migraines), pulmonary disease (emphysema, COPD, bronchitis), gastrointestinal issues (malnutrition) and joint and back issues.

==== Socio-emotional development ====
Adults and adolescents who have been victims of childhood neglect may also be at higher risk for substance use disorders, carceral system involvement, and the perpetration of abusive or neglectful parenting than those who have not experienced early childhood abuse.

==== Psychological development ====
Victims of childhood neglect are at increased risk of development of post-traumatic stress disorder (PTSD) which can lead to further adverse mental health outcomes (depression, suicidality, substance use, behavioral disorders, etc.). These mental health consequences of neglect may effect one's ability to engage with one's day to day obligations in a negative way.

== See also ==
- PTSD in children and adolescents
- Maslow's hierarchy of needs
- Complex post-traumatic stress disorder
