= Jay Lebow =

American family psychologist (born 1948)

- Born: Elizabeth, NJ
- Education: Northwestern University: BA (1970), MA (1973), PhD (1974)
- Known for: integration in couple and family therapy, interface of research and practice in psychotherapy, practice of couple and family therapy, editor of Family Process and numerous books
- Scientific career
- Fields: Clinical Psychology, Family Psychology, Marriage and Family Therapy
- Workplaces: The Family Institute at Northwestern and Northwestern University

Jay Lebow (born June 18, 1948) is an American family psychologist who is senior scholar at the Family Institute at Northwestern University, clinical professor at Northwestern University and is editor-in-chief of the journal Family Process. He is board certified by the American Board of Professional Psychology. Lebow is known for his publications and presentations about the practice of couple and family therapy, integrative psychotherapy, the relationship of research and psychotherapy practice, and psychotherapy in difficult divorce, as well as for his role as an editor in the fields of couple and family therapy and family science. He is the author or editor of 13 books and has written 200 journal articles and book chapters.

== Background ==
Born in Elizabeth, New Jersey in 1948, Lebow earned his BA (1970), MA (1973), and PhD (1974) in psychology from Northwestern University. He completed his clinical internship at the University of Mississippi Medical Center. Post-doctoral study (1978–1980) included participation in the Family Institute at Northwestern's Postgraduate Two-Year Training Program in Family Therapy.

== Career ==
Lebow is a proponent and developer of methods of integrative practice of couple therapy and family therapy (Evans, 2010; Wilson, 2010). Integrative couple and family therapy merges various theoretical approaches to couple and family therapy into a set of methods for best practice. Lebow's Couple and Family Therapy: An Integrative Map of the Territory (Lebow, 2014; Karam 2014) identifies the shared concepts and intervention strategies that are the foundation for modern couple and family therapy. Crucial are a set of common factors that are at work in all therapies, and another set of common factors specific to couple and family therapies. In Common Factors in Couple and Family Therapy, Lebow with Doug Sprenkle and Sean Davis (Seedall, 2011; Sprenkle, Davis, & Lebow, 2009) argued that factors shared across therapies account for more of the variance in outcome than specific model factors. These common factors include the therapeutic alliance, setting positive and realistic expectations, and maintaining a family systems perspective.

Building on such common factors and shared strategies of change, Lebow (with William Pinsof, Doug Breunlin, Bill Russell, Cheryl Rampage, and Anthony Chambers) is a developer of Integrative Systemic Therapy, an integrative model for individual, couple, and family therapy that subsumes a wide range of theoretical concepts and treatment strategies into a coherent structure for practice (Pinsof et al., 2011; Pinsof et al., 2018; Carr, 2012).

Lebow is also known for his more specific model for treating those involved in high conflict divorce. This approach, described in Treating the Difficult Divorce: A Guide for Therapists (Lebow, 2019), applies an integrative family systems perspective (as opposed to a focus on each parent and the child) to those having significant problems with this life transition.

Another major theme of Lebow's career has been bridging the gap between research and practice. Research for the Psychotherapist: From Science to Practice, a volume of essays focused on bridging the research–practice gap originally published in 2006 (Evans, 2010; Lebow, 2006) and recently released in its second edition (Lebow & Jenkins, 2018), envisions artful practice as solidly based in and interwoven with the findings from research, the two melding into a unified clinical science. For several years, Lebow wrote a column for the Psychotherapy Networker about the relationship of research and practice in psychotherapy.

Since 2012, Lebow has been editor-in-chief of the journal Family Process, the oldest journal in the field of family therapy (Imber-Black, 2011). Lebow brought his integrative focus to the journal, including articles about all couple and family therapy orientations, and bridging articles about research in family science and the practice of couple and family therapy.

Lebow edited several major books focused on theory, research, and practice of couple and family therapy including the Encyclopedia of Couple and Family Therapy (co-edited with Anthony Chambers and Doug Breunlin; Lebow, Chambers, & Breunlin, 2019), Clinical Handbook of Couple and Family Therapy (co-edited with Alan Gurman and Douglas Snyder (Gurman, Lebow, & Snyder, 2015), the Handbook of Family Therapy (co-edited with Tom Sexton; Sexton & Lebow, 2016); Twenty-First Century Psychotherapies (Lebow, 2008), and Family Psychology: The Art of the Science (co-edited with William Pinsof (Pinsof & Lebow, 2005).

Lebow is the author of 200 book chapters and articles, most of which focus on practice of couple and family therapy, the relationship of research and practice, integrative practice, and intervention strategies with divorcing families. He is the author of many highly cited review papers summarizing the state of theory, practice, and research in couple and family therapy including the decade review of couple therapy for Journal of Marital and Family Therapy, the decade review of couple therapy research for Journal of Marital and Family Therapy, the summary of couple and family therapy for The Handbook of Psychology, the summary of integrative methods for the Handbook of Family Therapy, and summaries of methods of family therapy in the Comprehensive Handbook of Psychiatry and the Psychologist PDR. His early paper about consumer satisfaction with medical care in Psychological Bulletin is a highly cited article.

Lebow has also played an advisory role in the Family Institute's progress research program, participating in the development, evaluation and deployment of the institute's STIC (Systemic Therapy Inventory of Change) system for collecting and feeding back client data to help therapists and clients co-assess and co-plan their therapy (Pinsof et al., 2015).

Lebow has engaged in clinical practice, teaching, supervision, and research on couple and family therapy for over forty years, and is board certified in family psychology and an approved supervisor and clinical member of the American Association for Marriage and Family Therapy. His clinical work is demonstrated in the videos Integrative Family Therapy (Hargrove & Malone, 2007) and Working With Issues in Divorce distributed by the American Psychological Association (APA). He is a past president of the Society for Couple and Family Psychology of the APA, and served for many years on the board of directors and as committee chairs of the American Family Therapy Academy.

== Recognition ==
Lebow was named "Family Psychologist of the Year" in 2007 by the Society for Couple and Family Psychology of the American Psychological Association, and in 2014 received the Lifetime Achievement Award of the American Family Therapy Academy. He is a fellow of the American Psychological Association and three of its divisions: Society for Couple and Family Psychology, Society for Advancement of Psychotherapy, and Society for Clinical Psychology. He has served as Visiting Faculty, Aitia Family Institute, Shanghai, China, and Distinguished Scholar, Chinese University of Hong Kong.

== Key publications ==
- Lebow, J. L. (2019). Treating the Difficult Divorce: A Guide for Therapists. Washington, DC: American Psychological Association.
- Lebow, J. L. (2014). Couple and Family Therapy: An Integrative Map of the Territory. Washington DC: APA books.
- Lebow, J., & Jenkins, P. H. (2018). Research for the Psychotherapist: From Science to Practice (2nd ed.). New York: Routledge.
- Pinsof, W. M., Breunlin, D. C., Russell, W. P., Lebow, J., Rampage, C., & Chambers, A. L. (2018). Integrative Systemic Therapy: Metaframeworks for Problem Solving with Individuals, Couples, and Families. Washington, DC: American Psychological Association.
- Sexton, T. and Lebow, J. L. (eds.) (2016). Handbook of Family Therapy. New York: Routledge.
- Gurman, A.S., Lebow, J. L. & Snyder, D.K. (2015). Clinical Handbook of Couple Therapy (5th ed.). New York: Guilford.
- Sprenkle, D., Davis, S., & Lebow, J. L. (2009). Common factors in couple and family therapy. New York: Guilford.
- Lebow, J. L. (ed.) (2008). 21st century psychotherapies. New York: John Wiley & Sons.
- Lebow, J. L. (2006). Research for the Psychotherapist: From Science to Practice. New York: Routledge.
- Pinsof, W. & Lebow, J. L. (eds.) (2005). Family psychology: The science of the art. New York: Oxford Press.
- Lebow, J. L. (ed.) (2005). Handbook of Clinical Family Therapy. New York: John Wiley & Sons
- Pinsof, W., Breunlin, D., Russell, W. and Lebow, J. (2011). Integrative problem centered metaframeworks therapy II—Planning, conversing and integrating feedback, Family Process.
- Lebow, J. L., Chambers, A., Christensen, A. & Johnson, S. M. (2012). Marital Distress. Journal of marital and family therapy. 38, 145–168
- Lebow, J. L. (2003). Integrative Family Therapy for Disputes Involving Child Custody and Visitation, Journal of Family Psychology, 17, 181–192
- Lebow, J. L. & Gurman, A. (1995). Research assessing couple and family therapy. Annual Review of Psychology, Annual Reviews Inc, Palo Alto, CA., 46, 27–57.
- Johnson, S. & Lebow, J. L. (2000). The coming of age of couples therapy: a decade review, Journal Marital and Family Therapy of, 26, 23–38.
- Lebow, J. L. (1982). Consumer satisfaction with mental health treatment. Psychological Bulletin, 91, 244–259.
