= American Association for Marriage and Family Therapy =

American trade association

American Association for Marriage and Family Therapists
- Abbreviation: AAMFT
- Founded: 1942; 84 years ago
- Website: aamft.org

The American Association for Marriage and Family Therapy (AAMFT) is a professional association in the field of marriage and family therapy representing more than 50,000 marriage and family therapists throughout the United States, Canada, and abroad.

== History ==
Founded in 1942 as the American Association of Marriage Counselors, the AAMFT has been involved with the problems, needs and changing patterns of couples and family relationships. A central premise of AAMFT is that marriage and family therapists should treat relationships within families rather than the symptoms of individuals based on a view that individuals are part of relationship systems.

== Goals ==
The association focuses on increasing understanding, research and education in the field of marriage and family therapy.

The AAMFT aims to:

1. Facilitate research, theory development and education,
2. Establish and implement standards for programs that serve as the basis for accreditation,
3. Establish implement standards for clinical supervision, professional ethics and the clinical practice of marriage and family therapy.
4. Serve as a recognized accreditor in North America for the accreditation of MFT academic programs in the United States and Canada.

== Continuing Education ==
The AAMFT conducts an annual national conference in the United States each fall as well as a week-long series of continuing education institutes in the summer and winter.

== Accreditation of Academic Programs ==
AAMFT's "is the nationally recognized accrediting agency that accredits Master's degree, doctoral degree, and post-graduate degree clinical training programs in marriage and family therapy throughout the United States and Canada."

== Licensing of Marriage and Family Therapists ==
Within the United States, marriage and family therapy is regulated by individual states.

== Marriage and Family Therapy Journals ==
- Contemporary Family Therapy
- Family Process
- Family Relations
- Journal of Child and Family Studies, ISSN 1062-1024 (Print) ISSN 1573-2843 (Online), Springer
- Journal of Family Psychology
- Journal of Marital and Family Therapy
