= David Epston =

Canadian social worker & therapist (born 1944)

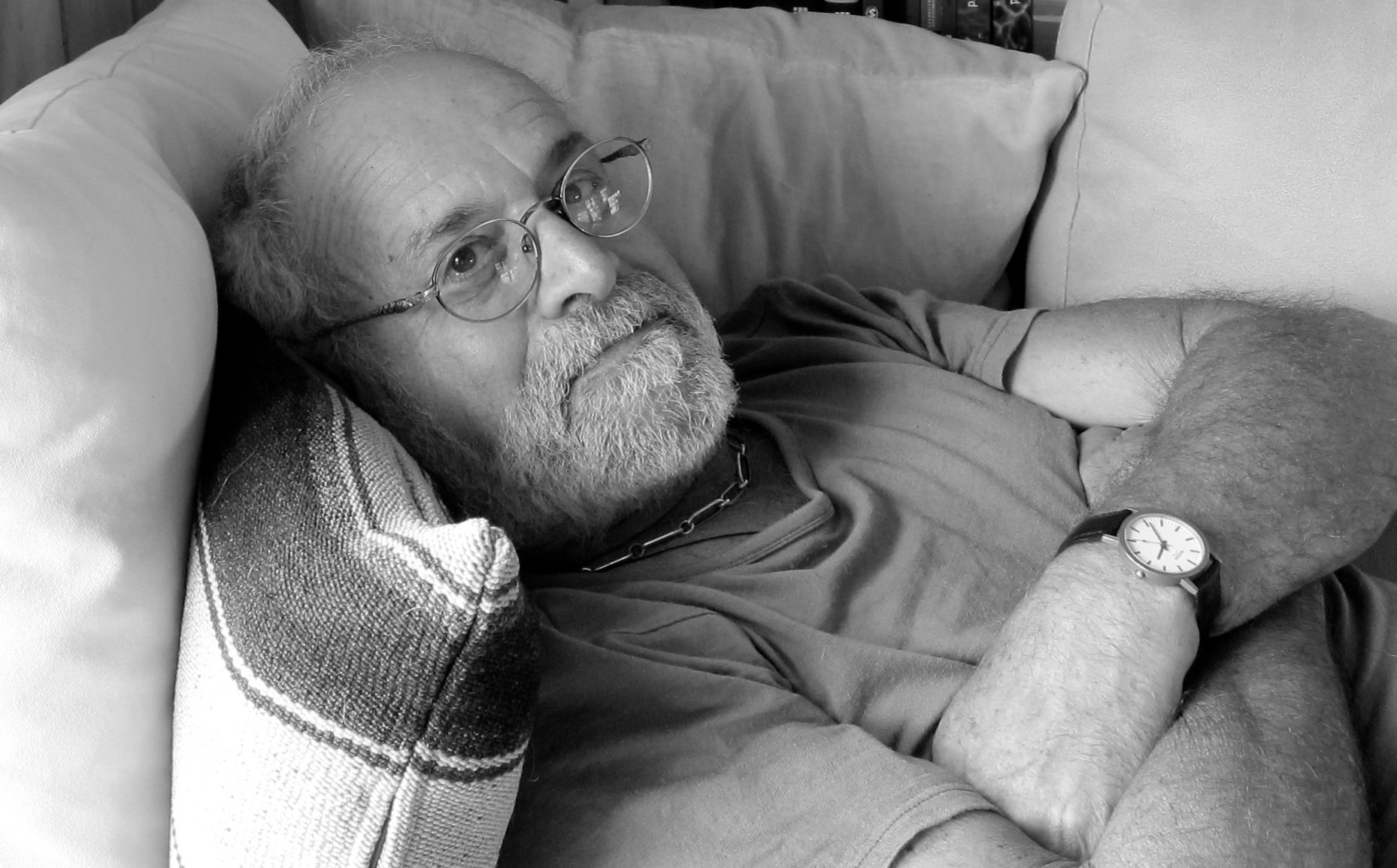
- Born: 30 August 1944 (age 82); Peterborough, Ontario, Canada
- Occupations: family therapist, author, social worker

David Epston (born 30 August 1944) is a New Zealand social worker and therapist, formerly co-director of the Family Therapy Centre in Auckland, New Zealand, formerly visiting professor at the John F. Kennedy University, formerly an honorary clinical lecturer in the Department of Social Work, University of Melbourne, and formerly an affiliate faculty member in the Ph.D program in Couple and Family Therapy at North Dakota State University. Epston and his late friend and colleague Michael White (social worker and psychotherapist) are known as originators of narrative therapy.

== Early life and education ==
David Epston was born in Peterborough, Ontario, Canada, where he grew up. He left Canada in 1963 when he was 19, arriving in New Zealand in 1964 where he attended the University of Auckland. He graduated from the University of Auckland in 1969 with a B.A. in Sociology and Anthropology. He received a Diploma in Community Development from the University of Edinburgh in 1971, an M.A. in Applied Social Studies from the University of Warwick in 1976, and a Certificate of Qualification in Social Work in 1977.

== Career in family therapy ==
In New Zealand Epston started working as a senior social worker in an Auckland hospital. From 1981 to 1987 he worked as consultant family therapist at the Leslie Centre, run by Presbyterian Support Services in Auckland. From 1987 to 2019 he was co-director of The Family Therapy Centre in Auckland.

In the late 1970s Epston and Michael White led the flowering of family therapy within Australia and New Zealand. Together they started developing their ideas, continuing during the 1980s, and eventually in 1990 published Narrative Means to Therapeutic Ends, the first major text in what came to be known as narrative therapy. In 1997 following the publication of Playful Approaches to Serious Problems Epston, along with his co-authors Dean Lobovits and Jennifer Freeman, initiated the website Narrative Approaches. It includes series of authored and co-authored papers, artwork, and poetry in the form of an "Archive of Resistance: Anti-Anorexia/anti-Bulimia."

Since the 1990s, Epston has continue to write books and present workshops on narrative therapy and other related topics, including bulimia and anorexia nervosa, child psychotherapy, and psychotherapy within the Māori community.

Epston has also taught at the UNITEC Institute of Technology's school of community studies in Auckland.

== Publications ==
- 1989. Literate Means to Therapeutic Ends. With Michael White. Adelaide: Dulwich Centre Publications.
- 1990. Narrative Means to Therapeutic Ends. With Michael White. W.W. Norton.
- 1992. Experience, Contradiction, Narrative and Imagination: Selected papers of David Epston & Michael White, 1989-1991. With Michael White. Adelaide, South Australia: Dulwich Centre Publications.
- 1997. Playful approaches to serious problems: narrative therapy with children and their families. With Jennifer Freeman and Dean Lobovits. W.W. Norton.
- 2004. Biting the hand that starves you: inspiring resistance to anorexia/bulimia. With Richard Linn Maisel and Ali Borden. W.W. Norton.
- 2008. Down under and up over: travels with narrative therapy. Edited by Barry Bowen. Karnac Books. ISBN 978-0-9523433-1-8
- 2016: with David Marsten and Laurie Markham. Narrative Therapy in Wonderland: Connecting with Children's Imaginative Know-how, W.W. Norton
- 2017: with Wiremu NiaNia and Allister Bush. Collaborative and Indigenous Mental Health Therapy: Tātaihono: Stories of Māori Healing and Psychiatry, Routledge
- 2022: with Travis Heath and Tom Carlson. Reimagining Narrative Therapy through Practice Stories and Auto Ethnography. Routledge.
