= Carl Weems =

American academic

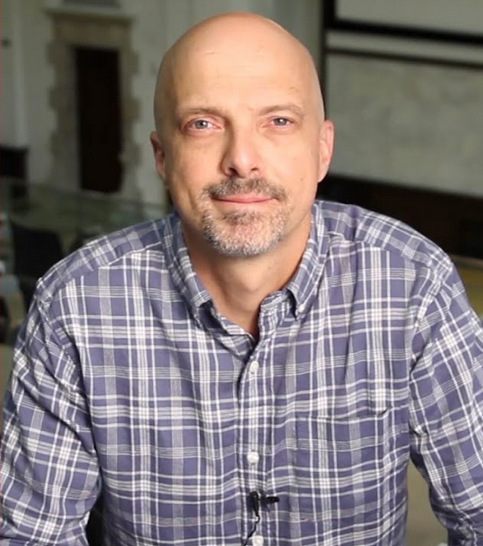

Professor and Chair at Iowa State University

Carl Weems is a Professor and was Chair of the Department of Human Development and Family Studies at Iowa State University from 2015 to 2025. Previously, he was a professor at the University of New Orleans.

== Education ==
Weems received his bachelor's degree in psychology from Florida State University, his master's degree in experimental psychology from Hollins University, his doctoral degree in lifespan developmental psychology from Florida International University, and he completed post-doctoral study at Stanford University.

== Scholarly and scientific career ==
Weems is known for his basic and translational research in developmental psychology. He has authored and co-authored over 160 peer-reviewed journal articles and a book titled "The Neuroscience of Pediatric PTSD".

Weems is the principal investigator of the main ISU Child Welfare Research and Training Project grants (CWRTP). He is also the Co-Principal Investigator/Co-director of Enabling Sustainable Community Health through a Transdisciplinary Translational Research Network (UTURN). Since 2008 he has served as editor-in-chief of the Child and Youth Care Forum, a multidisciplinary, peer-reviewed academic journal.

Weems' scientific contributions include: researching and creating a model describing the effect of traumatic stress on amygdala development, proposing a network model of PTSD in childhood and adolescence, and providing a revised model of adverse childhood experiences called Traumatic and Adverse Childhood Experiences (TRACEs) integrating resilience and the neuroscience of PTSD. The revised model has generated scientific and community use as an alternative view of the effect of adverse childhood experiences. His empirical work has also led to a theory for understanding the developmental expression of anxiety disorders across childhood and adolescence through understanding the role of statistical suppressor effects. Additionally, he has contributed to intervention development and prevention programming for child and youth anxiety and PTSD.

== Fellowship ==
Weems is a fellow of the American Psychological Association and Association for Psychological Science.
