= Nathan Ackerman =

American physician (1908–1971)

Nathan W. Ackerman (November 22, 1908 – June 12, 1971) was a Russian-born American psychiatrist, psychoanalyst, and one of the most important pioneers of the field of family therapy. He also was an expert in marriage counselling.

== Biography ==
Ackerman was born to a well-to-do Russian Jewish family in Bessarabia, Russian Empire. His parents, David Ackerman (? — 1948) and Bertha Gringberg (1883 — 1978), both pharmacists. The family decided to emigrate to New York City in 1912.

Ackerman obtained his medical degree from Columbia University in 1933. He assumed the post of chief psychiatrist at the Menninger Child Guidance Clinic (see Menninger Foundation) in 1937. In 1955, he contributed to the founding of the American Academy of Psychoanalysis. In 1957 he founded the Family Mental Health Clinic in New York, and the Family Institute in 1960, which was later renamed the Ackerman Institute after his death in New York in 1971. In 1961 he co-founded the first ever family therapy journal Family Process with Donald deAvila Jackson and Jay Haley.

Ackerman attended a public school in New York City. In 1929 he was awarded a B.A. from Columbia University, and in 1933 earned his M.D. from the same university. After a short spell (1933–34) as an intern at the Montefiore Hospital in New York, he interned at the Menninger Clinic and Sanitorium in Topeka, Kansas. He joined their psychiatric staff in 1935.

== Works ==
Ackerman greatly influenced and concentrated on the study on psychosexual stages on character formation and was one of the first clinicians to attempt to integrate insights from individual psychotherapy with the then newer ideas from systems theory. He is best known for his contribution to the development of the psychodynamic approach to family therapy. With regards to family therapy, Ackerman incorporated the idea of "the family being a social and emotional unit." His main focuses, with respect to family therapy, were intergenerational ties and conflicts, the influence of long-term social change impacting the family, the developmental stages of the family as a single unit, the importance of emotion within the family structure, and equal amounts of authority among parents.

== Death ==
Nathan Ackerman died of a heart attack in 1971 in Putnam Valley, New York

== Bibliography ==
- Ackerman, N.W. (1938). "The unity of the family". Archives of Pediatrics. 55: 51–62.
- Ackerman, N.W.; Sobel, R. (October 1950). "Family Diagnosis: an Approach to the Preschool Child". American Journal of Orthopsychiatry. 20 (4): 744–53. doi:10.1111/j.1939-0025.1950.tb05473.x. PMID 14789963.
- Ackerman, N.W. (1958). The Psychodynamics of Family Life. Basic Books: New York.
- Ackerman, N.W., Beatman, F.L. & Sherman, S.N. (Eds.) (1961). Exploring the base for family therapy: papers from the M. Robert Gomberg Memorial Conference (held on June 2 and 3 1960, at the Academy of Medicine, New York, N.Y.) Family Service Association of America: New York.
- Ackerman, N.W. (1962). Family Psychotherapy and Psychoanalysis: The Implications of Difference. Family Process. 1 (1) pp. 30–43, March 1962.
- Ackerman, N.W. (1966). Treating the Troubled Family. Basic Books: New York.
- Ackerman, N.W. (1970). Family process. Basic Books: New York.
- Ackerman, N.W., co-written with Javad Nurbakhsh and Hamideh Jahangiri (2019).

== See also ==
- Ackerman Institute for the Family
- Interpersonal therapy
- Harry Stack Sullivan
