= The Lancet Psychiatry =

- Discipline: Psychiatry
- Language: English
- Edited by: Joan Marsh

Publication details
- Publisher: Elsevier
- Impact factor: 21.1 (2025)

Standard abbreviations
- ISO 4: Lancet Psychiatry

Indexing
- ISSN: 2215-0366

Links
- Journal homepage

The Lancet Psychiatry is a peer-reviewed scientific journal published by Elsevier. It is a speciality journal of The Lancet.

== Abstracting and indexing ==
The journal is abstracted and indexed in:

- Science Citation Index Expanded
- Scopus
- Social Sciences Citation Index
- Embase
- MEDLINE

According to the Journal Citation Reports, the journal has a 2022 impact factor of 64.3 and is ranked second out of 155 journals in the category Psychiatry.
