= Journal of Marital and Family Therapy =

Quarterly peer-reviewed academic journal

- Discipline: Counseling
- Language: English
- Edited by: Lenore McWey

Publication details
- History: 1975–present
- Publisher: Wiley-Blackwell on behalf of the American Association for Marriage and Family Therapy
- Frequency: Quarterly
- Impact factor: 1.4 (2025)

Standard abbreviations
- ISO 4: J. Marital Fam. Ther.

Indexing
- ISSN: 1752-0606 (print); 1752-0606 (web)
- OCLC no.: 803727967

Links
- Journal homepage; Online access; Online archive

The Journal of Marital and Family Therapy is a quarterly peer-reviewed academic journal published by Wiley-Blackwell on behalf of the American Association for Marriage and Family Therapy. The journal was established in 1975. The current editor-in-chief is Lenore McWey (Florida State University). The journal covers research, theory, clinical practice, and training in marital therapy and family therapy.

According to the Journal Citation Reports, the journal has a 2025 impact factor of 1.4, ranking it 33 out of 66 journals in the category "Family Studies".
