= Family Process =

- Discipline: Family studies, clinical psychology, marriage and family therapy
- Language: English, Spanish, Chinese
- Edited by: Jay Lebow

Publication details
- History: 1962-present
- Publisher: Wiley-Blackwell on behalf of the Family Process Institute
- Frequency: Quarterly
- Impact factor: 3.532 (2020)

Standard abbreviations
- ISO 4: Fam. Process

Indexing
- ISSN: 0014-7370 (print); 1545-5300 (web)
- LCCN: 67003256
- OCLC no.: 1250061550

Links
- Journal homepage; Online access; Online archive

Family Process is a quarterly peer-reviewed academic journal covering research on family system issues, including policy and applied practice. It is published by Wiley-Blackwell on behalf of the Family Process Institute. Since 2007, the journal publishes its abstracts in Chinese and Spanish in addition to English. The journal publishes original articles, including theory and practice, philosophical underpinnings, qualitative and quantitative clinical research, and training in couple and family therapy, family interaction, and family relationships with networks and larger systems.

== Abstracting and indexing ==
The journal is abstracted and indexed in:

- CINAHL
- CSA databases
- Current Contents/Social and Behavioral Sciences
- EBSCO databases
- Index Medicus/MEDLINE/PubMed
- PASCAL
- ProQuest databases
- PsycINFO
- Scopus
- Social Sciences Citation Index

According to the Journal Citation Reports, the journal has a 2020 impact factor of 3.532.

== History ==
The journal was established in 1962 by Nathan Ackerman, Donald deAvila Jackson, and Jay Haley as a mutual project of the Mental Research Institute and the Family Institute (later to be named the Ackerman Institute for the Family). Haley became the first editor-in-chief. During this decade, the journal was sold for $1,000 to what would become the Family Process Institute.

Don Bloch became the second editor. Included in the journal during his tenure was the development of the many types of family therapy models, emphasis on the family life cycle, culture, immigration, marital therapy, and gender. In the early 1980s, Bloch retired as editor, and was succeeded by Carlos Sluzki. During his tenure, the journal became more focused on the diversity of families. Peter Steinglass became editor in the 1990s. Two different trends appeared: a growth of empirical research and the advancement of evidence-based and evidence-informed models of treatment, and the unfolding of the narrative approach in family therapy. These different paradigms, belief systems, sets of assumptions, and approaches to knowledge inhabited the journal side by side. Randomized clinical trials were reported in the journal for the first time.

From 1998 to 2003, the editorship passed to Carol Anderson, the journal's first woman editor.

In the first decade of the 21st century, Evan Imber-Black became editor with the journal publishing both clinical and research issues on such topics as divorce, Latino families, asthma, and interdisciplinary training. During this time, the first translations into Spanish appeared along with translated abstracts into simple Chinese and Spanish.

In 2012, Jay Lebow became the current editor. Video abstracts are now available online for many of the journal's articles, and the first Chinese translation of a full article was published in the journal in 2012.
