= Behavioral Risk Factor Surveillance System =

United States health survey

The Behavioral Risk Factor Surveillance System (BRFSS) is a United States health survey that looks at behavioral risk factors. Begun in 1984, the BRFSS is run by Centers for Disease Control and Prevention and conducted by participating individual state health departments. The survey is administered by telephone and is the world's largest such survey. In 2009, the BRFSS began conducting surveys by cellular phone in addition to traditional "landline" telephones.

== Description ==
The BRFSS is a cross-sectional telephone survey conducted by state health departments with technical and methodological assistance provided by the CDC. In addition to all 50 states, the BRFSS is also conducted by health departments in The District of Columbia, Guam, Puerto Rico, and the U.S. Virgin Islands.

Individual states can add their own questions to the survey instrument, which consists of a core set of questions on certain topics like car safety, obesity, or exercise. States get funding from the federal government to administer these questionnaires, and they pay for the additional questions themselves.

The U.S. federal government can then compare states based on the core questions to allocate funding and focus interventions. The states themselves also use the survey results to focus interventions for the public and to decide what is worth their while to focus on. City, county, tribal, and local governments also rely on BRFSS data for information about their jurisdictions.

== Research and public health applications ==
BRFSS data are used by public health agencies and researchers to estimate the prevalence of chronic conditions, health-related behaviors, use of preventive services, and access to health care. The data also support comparisons between states and population groups, the monitoring of trends over time, public health program planning, and policy evaluation. Published research using BRFSS has examined topics including physical activity, mental health, obesity, tobacco and alcohol use, immunization, preventive screening, and chronic disease.

BRFSS has also been used in forecasting studies. A 2019 study published in The New England Journal of Medicine combined self-reported body mass index data from BRFSS with measured data from the National Health and Nutrition Examination Survey to adjust for reporting bias and project state- and demographic-group-specific prevalence of adult obesity and severe obesity through 2030.

The survey's optional cognitive decline module measures subjective, or self-reported, cognitive decline rather than clinically diagnosed dementia. BRFSS data have been used to monitor cognitive decline at the state and national levels and to study how memory loss and confusion affect daily activities. One study using pooled 2015–2020 data identified mild, moderate, and severe patterns of subjective cognitive decline and examined their associations with demographic and socioeconomic characteristics.

== See also ==
- Centers for Disease Control and Prevention
- National Center for Health Statistics
- Remington PL. The Behavioral Risk Factor Public Health Surveillance System. Am J Prev Med. 2020 Dec;59(6):776-778. doi: 10.1016/j.amepre.2020.09.002. Epub 2020 Nov 18.https://pubmed.ncbi.nlm.nih.gov/33220751/
