= Journal of Child and Family Studies =

- Discipline: Family and child psychology
- Language: English
- Edited by: Cheri J. Shapiro and Anne F. Farrell

Publication details
- History: 1992-present
- Publisher: Springer Science + Business Media
- Frequency: Quarterly
- Impact factor: 1.310 (2019)

Standard abbreviations
- ISO 4: J. Child Fam. Stud.

Indexing
- CODEN: JCFSES
- ISSN: 1062-1024 (print); 1573-2843 (web)
- LCCN: 92643457
- OCLC no.: 25526090

Links
- Journal homepage; Online archive

Journal of Child and Family Studies is a quarterly peer-reviewed academic journal published by Springer Science+Business Media that focuses on family child, adolescent, and family psychology. The editors-in-chief are Cheri J. Shapiro and Anne F. Farrell.

== Abstracting and indexing ==
The journal is abstracted and indexed in:

- Social Sciences Citation Index
- Current Contents/Social & Behavioral Sciences
- Scopus
- PsycINFO
- Academic Search
- CSA Illumina
- CAB Abstracts
- Global Health
- ERIC System Database
- International Bibliography of the Social Sciences
- EMCare

According to the Journal Citation Reports, the journal has a 2019 impact factor of 1.310.
