= Harlene Anderson =

American psychologist (born 1942)

Harlene Anderson (born 1942) is an American psychologist and a cofounder of the Postmodern Collaborative Approach to therapy. In the 1980s, Anderson and her colleague Harold A. Goolishian pioneered a new technique that is used to relate to patients within therapy through language and collaboration, and without the use of diagnostic labels. This approach to therapy places the patient in control of the therapy session and asks the therapist to focus on the present session and ignore any preconceived notions they may have. This approach was first developed for the use of family and mental health therapists, but has since expanded into a variety of professional practices such as organizational psychology, higher education, and research.

== Education ==
Anderson has her PhD in Psychology and is licensed to practice professional counseling and marriage and family therapy. Anderson received both her Bachelor's and Master's Degree from the University of Houston, Texas. She went on to receive her Doctorate in Psychology with a focus around Marriage and Family Therapy from Union Institute and University which is located in Cincinnati, Ohio.

== Research ==
In 1997, Anderson published her first book based around her theory around collaborative therapy called "Conversation, Language, and Possibilities: A Postmodern Approach to Therapy". This theory, called the Postmodern Collaborative Approach, focuses on therapists collaborating with their clients in a non-judgmental way to ensure that the client is being accurately understood. Outside of therapy sessions, therapists must continuously go through a process of self-reflection and self-awareness so as to avoid the innate judgmental nature of humans from clouding their own opinion of a future therapy session. Within therapy sessions, therapists take on a conversational role with their client and view the client as the expert in the conversation rather than themselves. Contrary to other therapeutic approaches from the time, the postmodern collaborative approach requested that therapists do not use diagnostic labels either since these may have preconceived notions and opinions behind them which may alter a therapists' view as well.

== Career ==
Harlene Anderson cofounded several institutes that further research in both the psychology and therapy fields. First, she cofounded the Houston Galveston Institute when it opened in 1978 and has since served on the board of directors for the following 41 years. After this, Anderson cofounded the Taos Institute in 1993 where she has worked on the board of directors for the past 26 years and currently serves as an advisor in their doctoral program. In 2002 Anderson founded and became acting principal of Access Success International. Anderson is on the board of directors for Texas Medical Assistant and Development and the Family Business Institute. She currently works as a consultant for businesses, schools, and individuals and is a keynote speaker at conferences for family and marriage therapy as well.

== Accomplishments/awards ==
Harlene Anderson has won several awards throughout her career for her contributions to theory development, as well as innovative practices and training. These include:

- 1997 Texas Association for Marriage and Family Therapy award for Lifetime Achievement.
- 2000 American Association for Marriage and Family Therapy award for Outstanding Contributions to Marriage and Family Therapy.
- 2008 American Academy of Family Therapy Award for Distinguished Contribution to Family Therapy Theory and Practice.

== Published books ==
- Anderson, H. (1997). Conversation, language, and possibilities: A postmodern approach to therapy. Basic Books.
- Anderson, H., & Jensen, P. (Eds.). (2007). Innovations in the reflecting process. Karnac Books.
- Anderson, H., Cooperrider, D. L., Gergen, K. J., Gergen, M. M., McNamee, S., & Whitney, D. (2008). The appreciative organization. Chagrin Falls, OH: Taos Institute Publications.
- Anderson, H., & Gehart, D. (Eds.). (2012). Collaborative therapy: Relationships and conversations that make a difference. Routledge.

== Representative journal articles ==
- Anderson, H. & London, S. (2011). Collaborative learning: Teachers learning through relationships and conversations. Nova Perspectiva Sistemica.
- Anderson, H. & Swim, S. (1993). Learning as collaborative conversation: Combining the student's and the teacher's expertise. Human systems: The Journal of Systemic Consultation and Management, 4, 145-160.
- Gergen, K., Hoffman, L. & Anderson, H. (1995). Is diagnosis a disaster?: A constructionist trialogue. In F. Kaslow (Ed.), Handbook of relational diagnosis (pp. 102-118). New York: John Wiley & Sons.
- Goolishian, H. & Anderson, H. (1980, Summer). Discussion: Engagement techniques in family therapy. International Journal of Family Therapy, 2(2).
- Goolishian, H. & Anderson, H. (1987). Language systems and therapy: An evolving idea. Psychotherapy, 24, 529-538.
- London, S. (2012). Collaborative therapy. (Sylvia London with reflections by Harlene Anderson). In A. Rambo, C. West, A. L. Schooley & T. V. Boyd (Eds). Family therapy review: Contrasting contemporary models. New York: Routledge.

== See also ==
- Collaborative therapy
  - Collaborative-Dialogic therapy
- Collaborative-Dialogic Practices
