= Michael White (psychotherapist) =

Australian social worker and family therapist (1948–2008)

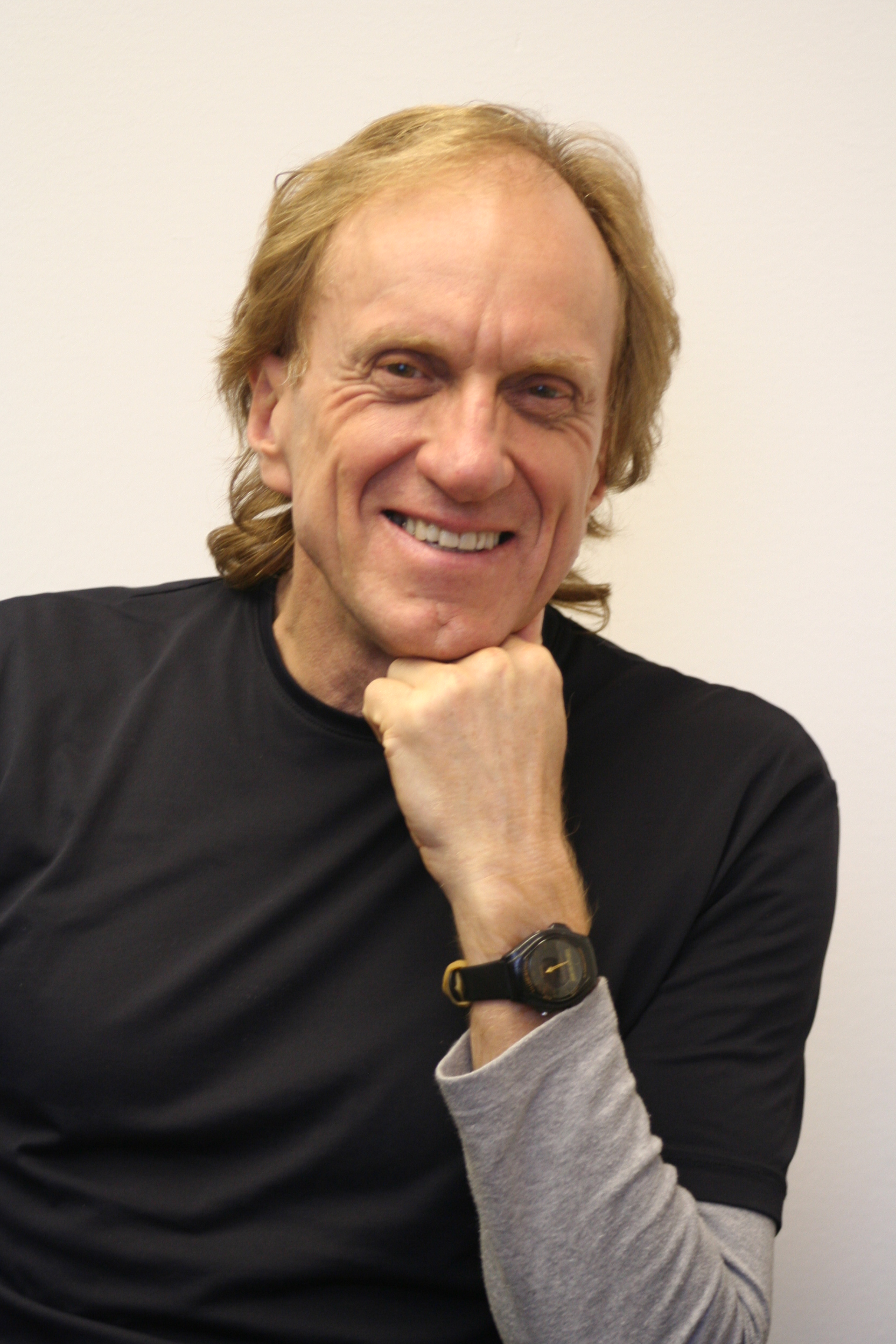
- Michael White, October 2006; photograph by Jill Freedman
- Born: 29 December 1948; Adelaide, South Australia
- Died: 4 April 2008 (aged 59); San Diego, California
- Occupations: social worker, family therapist, author

Michael White (29 December 1948 – 4 April 2008) was an Australian social worker and family therapist. He is known as the founder of narrative therapy, and for his significant contribution to psychotherapy and family therapy, which have been a source of techniques adopted by other approaches.

== Early life and education ==
Michael Kingsley White was born and raised in Adelaide, South Australia. He dropped out of school at sixteen years old and took a job in a draughtsman's office. He discovered that his skills were in talking to and listening to people, and so he eventually became a probation and welfare worker. He earned an undergraduate social work degree from the University of South Australia in 1979.

== Career ==
After university, White worked as a psychiatric social worker at the Adelaide Children's Hospital. He founded the Dulwich Centre in 1983 and began a private practice as a family therapist. He continued to be associated with Dulwich Centre until his death.

Together with David Epston, White developed the school of thought that came to be known as narrative therapy. One of their first collaborations, and perhaps their most influential book, was Narrative Means to Therapeutic Ends, published in 1990 by W.W. Norton.

White was also particularly known for his work with children and Indigenous Aboriginal communities, as well as with schizophrenia, anorexia/bulimia, men's violence, and trauma.

In January 2008, White set up the Adelaide Narrative Therapy Centre to provide counselling services and training workshops relevant to work with individuals, couples, families, groups and communities and to provide a context for exploring recent developments relevant to narrative practice."

He received the following awards, honours, invitations:

- International Fellow, American Association for Marriage and Family Therapy
- Masters Interview, American Association of Marriage and Family Therapy Conference, San Francisco, 1989.
- Honorary Doctorate of Humane Letters, John F. Kennedy University, Orinda, California.
- Distinguished Contribution to Family Therapy Theory & Practice Award, American Family Therapy Academy, 1999.

== Personal life and death ==
White was married to Cheryl White until 2006, when the couple separated. They had one child together.

He died in San Diego on April 4, 2008 from a heart attack at age 59.

== Work ==
=== Influences ===
While early influences included those of systems theory and cybernetics (Gregory Bateson), White's main work drew on a wide range of sources, including literary theory (Jerome Bruner), cultural anthropology (Clifford Geertz, Barbara Myerhoff, Victor Turner), non-structuralist psychology (William James, Lev Vygotsky) and French critical / post-structuralist philosophy (Jacques Derrida, Gilles Deleuze and Michel Foucault).

=== Theoretical and practice innovations ===
Key therapeutic ideas developed by White include 'externalizing the problem', commonly summarised as 'the person is not the problem, the problem is the problem'; 're-authoring' the dominant stories of people's lives; and the idea of 'double-listening' to accounts of trauma: not only the accounts of trauma itself, but how people have responded to trauma.

Key practices of narrative therapy and 'maps' of narrative practice include:

- The statement of position map / externalising conversations map
- Re-authoring conversations
- Re-membering conversations
- Definitional ceremonies
- Scaffolding conversations
- The absent but implicit
- Responding to personal failure conversations

== Publications ==
- 1989. Literate Means to Therapeutic Ends. With David Epston. Adelaide: Dulwich Centre Publications.
- 1990. Narrative Means to Therapeutic Ends. With David Epston. (WW Norton & Company, New York).
- 1995. Re-Authoring Lives: Interviews and Essays. Adelaide, South Australia: Dulwich Centre Publications. ISBN 0-646-22735-1
- 1995. Narratives of Therapists' Lives. Adelaide, South Australia: Dulwich Centre Publications.
- 2000. Reflections on Narrative Practice. Adelaide, South Australia: Dulwich Centre Publications.
- 2004. Narrative Practice and Exotic Lives: Resurrecting diversity in everyday life. Adelaide, South Australia: Dulwich Centre Publications.
- 1992. Experience, Contradiction, Narrative and Imagination: Selected papers of David Epston & Michael White, 1989-1991. With David Epston. Adelaide, South Australia: Dulwich Centre Publications.
- 2006. Narrative Therapy with Children and their Families. With Alice Morgan. Adelaide, South Australia: Dulwich Centre Publications.
- 2007. Maps of Narrative Practice. (WW Norton & Company, New York)
- 2011. Narrative Practice: Continuing the Conversations. (WW Norton & Company, New York)

Michael White's books have also been published in Danish, Spanish, Japanese, Swedish, Italian, German, Chinese, Finnish, French and Portuguese.

== Magazine articles and radio features ==
- Cowley, G. & K. Springen. (1995). Rewriting life stories. Newsweek, 17 April.
- Wylie, M.S. (1994). Panning for gold. Family Therapy Networker, 18(6), 40-48.
- Special report on narrative therapy, Life Matters, ABC Radio National, broadcast 23 December 1999 (repeated 8 October 2002).
- Writing on the Mind – the power of story telling, All in the Mind, ABC Radio National, broadcast 1 October 2005.
