= Collaborative therapy =

Therapy developed by Harlene Anderson

Collaborative therapy is a therapy developed by Harlene Anderson, along with Harold A. Goolishian (1924–1991), in the US. It is intended for clients who are well educated in any field, or for those that have distrust of psychotherapists due to past negative experiences with one or more.

== Overview ==
Collaborative therapy gives the client the option to have a "non-authoritarian" counsellor, for clients who are not heteronormative, who have gender dysphoria or are transgender, or who choose to live an alternative lifestyle. Anderson used collaborative therapy in family therapy and marriage therapy with success, and believed it could help families and partners to understand the client better, should the client find that they cannot adhere to social norms any more, such as coming out as transgender or homosexual.

Collaborative therapy is intended primarily for adults, and for those with dual diagnosis, (i.e. more than one mental health issue usually due to substance abuse such as alcohol and non-prescription drugs); bipolar disorder, chronic schizophrenia and parents with psychosis, body dysmorphic disorder.

The model is a postmodernist approach that maintains that human reality is created through social construction and dialogue, and aims to avoid "the traditional Diagnostic and Statistical Manual of Mental Disorders (DSM-IV) used to diagnose individuals". It uses the idea that the clients become subject to mental pain when they have tried to apply "oppressive [']stories['], which dominate the person's life. It posits that problems occur when the way in which peoples' lives are storied by themselves and others does not significantly fit with their lived experience. It also assumes that significant aspects of their lived experience may contradict the dominant narrative in their lives. It states that the client internalizes what they regard as unreasonable societal standards, and in doing so are aspiring to ideals of fulfillment and excellence, leading to, for example, self-starvation and anorexia, extreme self-criticism in clinical depression, or a sense of powerlessness in the face of threat and anxiety"; obsessive compulsive disorder (OCD), and trichotillomania (hair pulling). These last two mental health issues as well as anorexia can often symptoms of body dysmorphic disorder (BDD). Cognitive behavioral therapy (CBT) can also be useful to treat this last condition.) (page 2)

== Process ==
Using the principle of 'not-knowing', Goolishian and Anderson's term for the recommended approach that therapists should have towards their clients. In this approach therapists avoid taking dogmatic postures and try to remain flexible to have their perspectives altered by their clients. In her book, Conversation Language and Possibilities: A Postmodern Approach to Therapy, Anderson says, "The meaning that emerges [in therapy] is influenced by what a therapist bring into conversation and their interactions with each other about it. The issue of new meaning relies on the novelty (not-knowing). Fred Newman and Lois Holzman talk about something quite similar when they speak about the "end of knowing." Fred Newman discusses the concept of non-knowing in his book, The End of Knowing; A New Developmental Way of Learning.

The therapist stance according to Collaborative Theory is summarized in the following list:

- Mutually Inquiring Conversational Partnership – Therapy as a partnership
- Relational Expertise – Client and therapist bring their expertise together
- Not-Knowing – Humility before the client
- Being Public – Therapist is open with their invisible thoughts
- Living with Uncertainty – Enjoy the spontaneity of a conversation
- Mutually Transforming – Hermeneutic circle, reciprocal effect on client and therapist
- Orienting towards Everyday Ordinary Life – Tap into natural resilience of clients.

== Bibliography ==
- "Collaborative Therapy: Relationships and Conversations that make a Difference", (2007)
