= Narrative therapy =

Form of psychotherapy

- MeSH: D062525

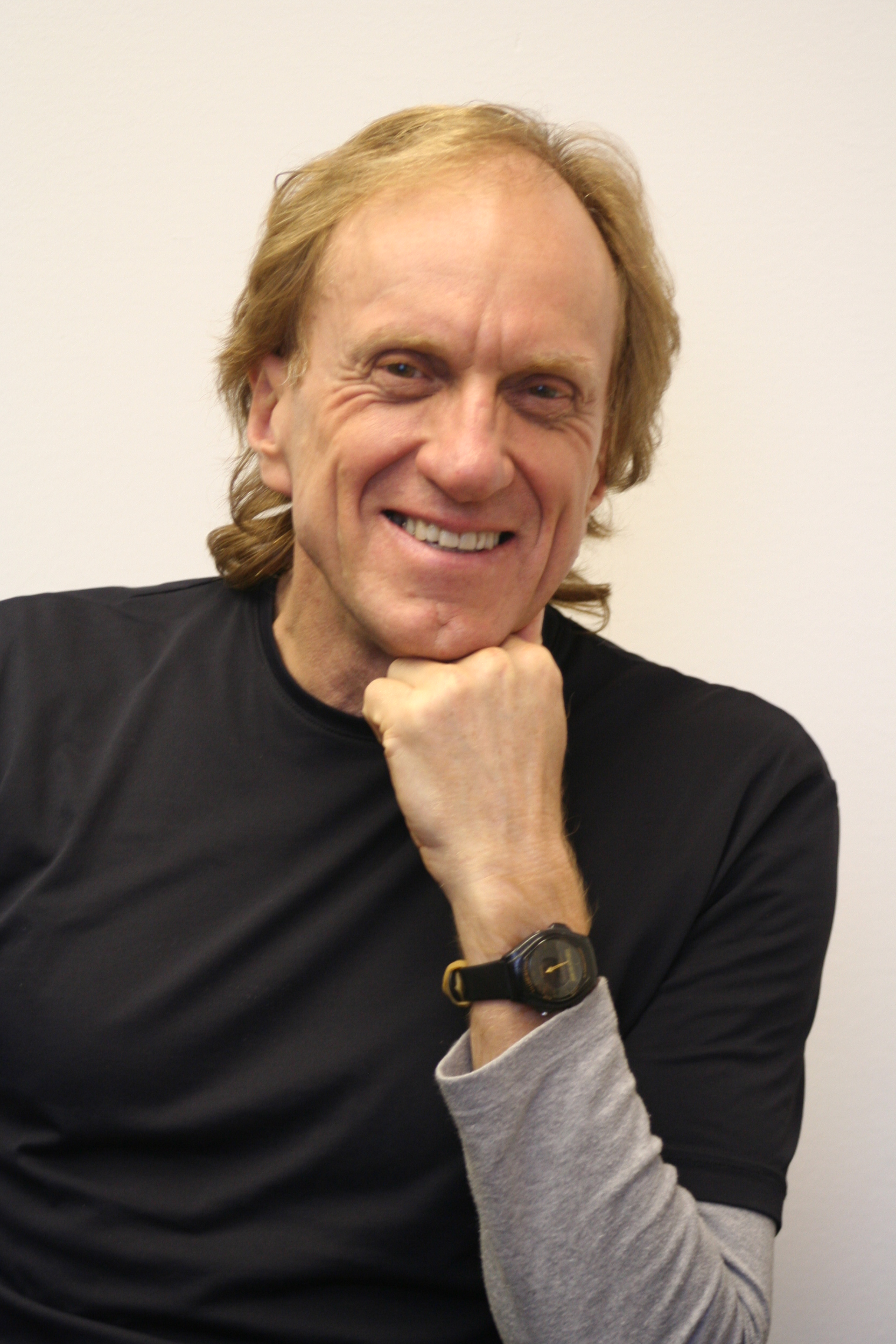
Michael White (pictured) helped develop narrative therapy.

Narrative therapy (or narrative practice) is a form of psychotherapy that seeks to help patients identify their values and the skills associated with them. It provides the patient with knowledge of their ability to embody these values so they can effectively confront current and future problems. The therapist seeks to help the patient co-author a new narrative about themselves by investigating the history of those values. Narrative therapy is a social justice approach to therapeutic conversations, seeking to challenge dominant discourses that shape people's lives in destructive ways. While narrative work is typically located within the field of family therapy, many authors and practitioners report using these ideas and practices in community work, schools and higher education. Narrative therapy has come to be associated with collaborative as well as person-centered therapy.

== History ==
Narrative therapy was developed during the 1970s and 1980s, largely by Australian social worker Michael White and David Epston of New Zealand, and it was influenced by different philosophers, psychologists, and sociologists such as Michel Foucault, Jerome Bruner, Lev Semyonovich Vygotsky etc.

== Conversation maps ==
=== Re-authoring identity ===
The narrative therapist focuses upon assisting people to create stories about themselves and their identities by way of listening and questioning. This work of "re-authoring identity" helps people identify their values and the skills to live out these values. By identifying the history of values throughout the client's life, narrative therapy is intended to support the client's ability to construct new stories about themself.

The story people tell about themselves and that is told about them is important in this approach, which asserts that the story of a person's identity may determine what they think is possible for themselves. The narrative process allows people to identify what values are important to them and how they might use their own skills and knowledge to live these values.

Narrative therapy focuses on "unique outcomes" (a term of Erving Goffman), or moments that contradict a client's personal "problem-saturated" narrative. Unique outcomes work by revealing a person's strengths, agency, and emotional vitality that are hidden behind a person's personal problem-focused narratives. Unique outcomes can help to reveal entryways to more positive alternative narratives that clients are encouraged to adapt.

=== Externalizing conversations ===
The concept of identity is important in narrative therapy. The approach aims not to conflate people's identities with the problems they may face or the mistakes they have made. Rather, the approach seeks to avoid modernist, essentialist notions of the self that lead people to believe there is a biologically determined "true self" or "true nature". Instead, identity, seen as primarily social, can be changed according to the choices people make.

To separate people's identities from the problems they face, narrative therapy employs externalizing conversations. The process of externalization allows people to consider their relationships with problems. Narrative therapy allows people to become separated from their "internalized" understandings or ideas of a problem by looking at the problem from a social context, engaging in the construction and performance of preferred identities, and externalizing a person's strengths or positive attributes.

An externalizing emphasis involves naming a problem so that a person can assess the problem's effects in their life, can analyze how the problem operates or works in their life, and in the end can choose their relationship to the problem.

=== "Statement of Position Map" ===
In a narrative approach, the therapist aims to adopt a collaborative therapeutic posture rather than imposing ideas on people by giving them advice. Michael White developed a conversation map called a "Statement of Position Map" designed to elicit the client's own evaluation of the problems and developments in their lives. Both the therapist and the client are seen as having valuable information relevant to the process and the content of the therapeutic conversation. By adopting a posture of curiosity and collaboration, the therapist aims to give the implicit message to people that they already have knowledge and skills to solve the problems they face. When people develop solutions to their own problems on the basis of their own values, they may become much more committed to implementing these solutions.

=== Re-membering practice ===
Narrative therapy identifies that identities are social achievements and the practice of re-membering draws closer those who support a person's preferred story about themselves and dis-engages those that do not support the person.

=== Absent but implicit ===
The concept of "absent but implicit" refers to the discernment people must make between their expressed experiences and other experiences that they had in the past and already assigned meaning to. The concept of "absent but implicit" is used to discover stories of oneself that lie underneath the problem narrative being provided. Inspired by the work of Jacques Derrida, Michael White became curious about the values implicit in people's pain, their sense of failure, and actions. Often, people only feel pain or failure when their values are abridged, or when their relationships and lives are not as they should be. Furthermore, there are often stalled initiatives that people take in life that are also guided by implicit values.

=== Outsider witnesses map ===
In this particular narrative practice, people will meet, listen, and respond to the preferred accounts of other's lives. This is referred to as "outsider witness practice" in narrative therapy. Often they are friends of the consulting person or past clients of the therapist who have their own knowledge and experience of the problem at hand. During the first interview, between therapist and consulting person, the outsider listens without comment.

Then the therapist interviews them with the instructions not to critique or evaluate or make a proclamation about what they have just heard, but instead to simply say what phrase or image stood out for them, followed by any resonances between their life struggles and those just witnessed. Lastly, the outsider is asked in what ways they may feel a shift in how they experience themselves from when they first entered the room.

Next, in similar fashion, the therapist turns to the consulting person, who has been listening all the while, and interviews them about what images or phrases stood out in the conversation just heard and what resonances have struck a chord within them.

In the end, an outsider witness conversation is often rewarding for witnesses. For the consulting person, the outcomes are remarkable: they learn they are not the only one with this problem, and they acquire new images and knowledge about it and their chosen alternate direction in life. The main aim of narrative therapy is to help clients to create new, positive stories that they can use to re-author their lives. Narrative therapy helps to separate and externalize people's problems so they can become empowered and retake control of their lives in a positive, meaningful ways.

== Therapeutic documents ==
Narrative therapy embodies a strong appreciation for the creation and use of documents, as when a person and a counsellor co-author "A Graduation from the Blues Certificate", for example. In some instances, case notes are created collaboratively with clients to provide documentation as well as markers of progress.

== Social-political therapeutic approach ==
A strong awareness of the impact of power relations in therapeutic conversations, with a commitment to checking back with the client about the effects of therapeutic styles in order to mitigate the possible negative effect of invisible assumptions or preferences held by the therapist. There is also an awareness of how social narratives such as femininity and masculinity can be corrupted and negatively influence peoples identities.

=== Eating disorders ===
Narrative therapy has made numerous contributions to the field of eating disorders. David Epston, Stephen Madigan and Catrina Brown have made the most significant contribution to bringing a depathologizing approach to this issue.

=== Men and domestic violence ===
Narrative therapy has also been applied to work with men who abuse their female partners. Alan Jenkins and Tod Augusta-Scott have been the most prolific in this field. They integrated a social-political analysis of the violence, while at the same time engaging men in a respectful, collaborative manner.

=== Community work ===
Narrative therapy has also been used in a variety of community settings. In particular, an exercise called "Tree of Life" has been used to mobilize communities to act according to their own values.

== Criticisms ==
There have been several formal criticisms of narrative therapy over what are viewed as its theoretical and methodological inconsistencies, among various other concerns.

- Narrative therapy has been criticised as holding to a social constructionist belief that there are no absolute truths, but only socially sanctioned points of view, and that Narrative therapists simply privilege their client's concerns over and above "dominating" cultural narratives.
- Several critics have posed concerns that narrative therapy has made gurus of its leaders, particularly in the light that its leading proponents tend to be overly harsh about most other kinds of therapy.
- Narrative therapy is also criticized for the lack of clinical and empirical studies to validate its many claims. Etchison & Kleist (2000) stated that narrative therapy's focus on qualitative outcomes is not congruent with larger quantitative research and findings which the majority of respected empirical studies employ today. This has led to a lack of research material which can support its claims of efficacy.

== See also ==
Theoretical foundations

- Constructivist epistemology
- Feminism
- Hermeneutics
- Postmodernism
- Poststructuralism

Related types of therapy

- Brief therapy
- Family therapy
- Logotherapy
- Response based therapy
- Script analysis
- Solution focused brief therapy

Other related concepts

- Dialogical self
- Lucid dream
- Narrative
