= List of clinical psychologists =

This list includes notable clinical psychologists and contributors to clinical psychology, some of whom may not have thought of themselves primarily as clinical psychologists but are included here because of their important contributions to the discipline.

== A ==
- Jonathan Abramowitz
- Alfred W. Adler (inferiority complex)
- Lauren Alloy
- Nathan Azrin

== B ==
- Richard Bandler, co-founder of neuro-linguistic programming (NLP)
- David H. Barlow, known for his study and treatment of anxiety and related disorders
- Albert Bandura
- Deirdre Barrett, researcher on dreams and hypnosis
- Aaron T. Beck, founder of cognitive therapy
- Kim Bergman, surrogacy psychologist
- Eric Berne
- Larry E. Beutler, systematic treatment selection
- Wilfred Bion
- Theodore H. Blau
- Nathaniel Branden, notable as a clinician for sentence stems technique, style of group therapy, clinical approaches to self-esteem work
- David D. Burns, cognitive-behavioral therapy/theory

== C ==
- James Cantor
- Robert Cialdini
- Stephen Connor

== D ==
- Lisa Damour
- Daniel O David
- Arthur A. Dole

== E ==
- Steve Eichel
- Albert Ellis, founder of rational-emotive therapy (RET)
- Erik Erikson
- Hans Eysenck

== F ==
- Ronald Fairbairn theorist of object-relations psychoanalysis
- Edna B Foa
- Anna Freud
- Sigmund Freud, Austrian neurologist and the founder of psychoanalysis

== G ==
- Paul Gilbert (psychologist), founder of compassion focused therapy (CFT)
- Pumla Gobodo-Madikizela
- Kurt Goldstein, theorist of holistic psychology and self-actualization
- Wayne Goodman

== H ==
- Lionel Haward, father of British forensic psychology
- Steven C. Hayes
- Stefan Hofmann
- Olivia Hooker
- Karen Horney, founder of feminist psychology and major theorist of conflict-based neuroses.
- Clark Hull

== I ==
- David Indermaur

== J ==
- Kay Redfield Jamison
- Arthur Janov, invented primal therapy
- Elizabeth Jeglic
- Mary Cover Jones
- Carl G. Jung, founder of analytical psychology

== K ==
- Alan E. Kazdin, developer of parent management training
- Melanie Klein

== L ==
- Michael Langone
- Robert Langs
- Jan van der Lans
- Arnold A. Lazarus, early writer in CBT
- Richard Lazarus
- Tatia Lee
- Harriet Lerner
- Marsha Linehan, founder of dialectical behavior therapy

== M ==
- Isaac Marks
- Paul R. Martin
- Abraham Maslow
- Rollo May
- Rufus May
- Paul Meehl
- Cindy Meston
- Jesse S. Miller
- Neal Miller
- Theodore Millon, known for his work on personality disorders

== O ==
- Joy Osofsky

== P ==
- Jordan Peterson
- Robert O. Pihl
- Rebecca Pillai Riddell

== Q ==
- Heinz Kohut, theorist of self psychology

== R ==
- Stanley Rachman
- Adam S. Radomsky
- Carl Rogers
- Richard Rogers
- Stephen Rollnick, co-founder of motivational interviewing with William R. Miller
- Marshall Rosenberg

== S ==
- Paul Salkovskis
- Edgar Schein
- Gernot Schiefer
- Kirk J. Schneider
- Martin Seligman
- Monte B. Shapiro
- Tamara Sher
- Hunter B. Shirley
- Margaret Singer
- B.F. Skinner
- Victor Skumin
- C. Michael Smith
- Daniel N. Stern
- Harry Stack Sullivan, founder of interpersonal psychoanalysis

== T ==
- Maurice K. Temerlin
- Edward Thorndike, behavior theorist

== V ==
- Douglas Vakoch

== W ==
- John B. Watson
- Adrian Wells
- D. W. Winnicott, object-relations psychoanalyst
- Joseph Wolpe
- Bobby E. Wright

== See also ==
- List of psychologists
- List of people by occupation
