= Steve Eichel =

American psychologist

- Born: Steve Kenneth Eichel; 1954 (age 71–72); United States
- Education: B.A., Columbia University; M.S., University of Pennsylvania; Ph.D., University of Pennsylvania
- Scientific career
- Fields: Psychology
- Workplaces: RETIRN
- Website: drsteveeichel.com

Steve K. D. Eichel (born Steve Kenneth Eichel; 1954) is a psychologist known primarily for his work on destructive cults, coercive persuasion, mind control, brainwashing, and deprogramming. He is a former president of the Greater Philadelphia Society of Clinical Hypnosis and the 2006–07 president of the American Academy of Counseling Psychology, the national membership academy comprising American Board of Professional Psychology (ABPP) Board-certified counseling psychologists. In 2012 he was installed as the President of the Board of the International Cultic Studies Association.

Eichel graduated with his Ph.D. in 1989 from the University of Pennsylvania. He has performed research with fellow psychologist Linda Dubrow in the area of procrastination. Dubrow and Eichel studied cult characteristics of the group Al-Qaeda after the September 11, 2001 attacks. Eichel was an expert witness in the 2003 case of Lee Boyd Malvo, where he testified that Malvo suffered from a form of dissociative disorder caused by coercive persuasion. He has worked to expose fraudulent practices of credentialing organizations, by obtaining numerous certifications for his pet cat, Zoe, including the National Guild of Hypnotists, the American Board of Hypnotherapy and the International Medical & Dental Hypnotherapy Association. Eichel has practiced clinical psychology in Philadelphia, Pennsylvania and Newark, Delaware. He has lectured on the subject of cults, brainwashing, and terrorism.

== Early life, family and education ==
Eichel is the child of survivors of the Holocaust; his parents spent time in Nazi concentration camps. His parents only recounted to him, "anecdotes here and there"; Eichel explained to The Philadelphia Inquirer, "Most of what I thought I knew about their experiences was my own fantasy that filled in the enormous gaps."

Eichel received a B.A. degree from Columbia University, and M.S. from University of Pennsylvania. He obtained his Ph.D. in 1989, at University of Pennsylvania. Eichel is a Board Certified Diplomate in Counseling Psychology, American Board of Professional Psychology.

== Research ==
In 1988, with fellow psychologist Linda Dubrow Eichel, he performed research in the area of procrastination. During the Persian Gulf war, Eichel said that images from the conflict affected his teenage clients, "Those two things really hit my teenage patients hard." He said that bad dreams about the battles were "little red lights, saying it's time to step back, think about yourself, think about your life, talk to other people, gather information, connect with people who are important to you. It is a warning sign that you should not go on with life as usual." He commented to The Philadelphia Inquirer in 2000 on the subject of the controversial religious group, the evangelical International Church of Christ; that the methodology behind the group "is that you give yourself over to the person who acts as your 'shepherd' or discipler, and they get tremendous control over you… Every minute [of your life] must be Christ-centered, and that when you give yourself over to Jesus, you give yourself over to the ICC." In 2000, Eichel said he had counseled approximately six former members of the group in his psychotherapy practice. Linda Dubrow and Eichel worked together at the organization Re-Entry Therapy, Information and Referral Network (RETIRN).

With Dubrow, Eichel has researched media coverage regarding September 11, 2001, attacks and has determined that the group Al-Qaeda is a cult. With Michael Langone and Arthur Dole, Eichel performed a series of studies researching and defining the concept of "new age"; their research was published in the Cultic Studies Journal.

Eichel was an expert witness in the 2003 criminal trial of Lee Boyd Malvo; in addition to psychologists Dewey Cornell and Diane Schetky and psychiatrist Neil Blumberg. Eichel testified that Malvo suffered from a form of dissociative disorder, caused by coercive persuasion.

Eichel exposed the nature of the mail-order credentialing of organizations in the United States by obtaining board certification from the "American Psychotherapy Association" for his pet cat, Zoe. The Washington Post reported in 2002: "Zoe has been issued credentials by the National Guild of Hypnotists, the American Board of Hypnotherapy and the International Medical & Dental Hypnotherapy Association, and is a Professional Member of the American Association of Professional Hypnotherapists." Eichel commented to BBC News regarding the motivation for this endeavor, "I felt I'd test my hypothesis and I did that by getting my cat certified by a number of the most prominent lay hypnosis organisations in the United States. It was a frighteningly simple process." The certifications were obtained for his cat, under the full name, "Dr. Zoe D. Katze".

Eichel utilizes hypnosis in his practice of psychotherapy. In 2003, Eichel practiced psychology in Philadelphia, Pennsylvania, and treated victims of sex addiction. He practiced in the area of clinical psychology. He lectured in 2008 on the subject of "Cults, Gangs, Terrorism or Brainwashing, Mind Control and the Law", at a conference on cults held by Creighton University. Eichel was scheduled to speak on June 19, 2010, at a conference titled: "Understanding Radicalization and De-Radicalization Strategies" in East Hartford, Connecticut, along with Pakistan's ambassador to the United States, Husain Haqqani, and psychologist Michael Langone.

In 2008, Eichel resided in Newark, Delaware.
