= Zeig =

Zeig is a surname. Notable people with the surname include:

- Jeffrey K. Zeig (born 1947), American psychotherapist, writer, and teacher
- Sande Zeig (born 1950), American film director and writer
