= Emory L. Cowen =

American psychologist

Emory L. Cowen (1926 – November 30, 2000) was an American psychologist who pioneered the promotion of wellness in mental health. Cowen is widely considered one of the fathers of community psychology and community mental health due to his research and implementation of early detection and primary and secondary prevention in mental health. In the field of psychology, he initiated the shift from treating dysfunction to preventing problems before they occurred.

== Biography ==
Cowen was born in Brooklyn, New York in 1926. He was raised on the “streets of Brooklyn” during the Great Depression, which left a lasting impression and became roots with which he identified throughout his life. Cowen married his high school sweetheart Renee Senna. Together they had four children: Rick, Peter, Lisa, and Andy, and later four grandchildren.

== Education ==
He attended Brooklyn College from 1940 to 1944 and received his bachelor's degree in psychology. He was the first in his family to attain a degree in higher education and his parents had visions of him becoming a history teacher, or even a lawyer with his degree. Cowen was less certain about his career goals. After receiving his bachelor's degree he served in the U.S. Navy for the next two years, from 1944 to 1946. Upon his return, a well-known and distinguished psychology faculty member at Brooklyn College, Abraham Maslow, convinced him to further his education in the field of psychology. At the time, Abraham Maslow had emphasized the new development of non-directive therapy within the field of psychology; thus in 1946, Cowen applied to and was accepted in a Clinical Psychology Program at Syracuse University, for graduate school to study with Arthur W. Combs, a former student of Carl Rogers. Cowen received his doctorate from Syracuse in 1950.

== Career ==
Cowen began his career as a faculty member at University of Rochester: he remained there until he retired. Throughout his career he made many notable contributions, including initiating the Primary Mental Health Project (PMHP), which is one of the most remarkable preventative initiatives, founding and directing the Center for Community Study in Rochester, NY, publishing over 300 articles, and mentoring approximately 80 graduate students, many of whom have continued on to become leaders in the field and perpetuate the legacy that began under Cowen's supervision.

Over the course of his career he held numerous influential positions. At the University of Rochester, Cowen was quickly promoted to Professor, and was later appointed as the Director of Clinical Training and the Associate Chairman of the Psychology Department. In addition, he served as associate or advisory editor of several journals, including the American Journal of Community Psychology, the Journal of Consulting and Clinical Psychology, and the Journal of Primary Prevention. He also held roles outside the walls of academia: he was president of APA Division 26 (Community Psychology) in 1974. Later, he served on the 1981–1988 APA Task Force on Promotion and Prevention in Mental Health. In 1978, he was a member of the Prevention Task Panel of President Carter's Commission on Mental Health. This panel was an interdisciplinary team that reviewed literature on primary prevention, which subsequently lead to a report that pushed for initiatives designed to give prevention an increased emphasis within NIMH.

Cowen has been honored with numerous awards from organizations for his pioneering efforts. These honors include the 1960 NIMH Special Senior Research Fellowship at the University of Paris, the 1979 Division 27 Distinguish Contribution Award to Community Psychology and Community Mental Health, 1984 Lela Rowland Prevention Award of the National Mental Health Association, 1989 Award for Distinguished Contributions to Psychology in the Public Interest, and the 1995 Seymour B. Sarason Award for novel and critical rethinking of basic assumptions and approaches in the human services, education, and other areas of community research and action. Further, he also received the Creative Community Program Award from the New York State Division of Youth, and the Outstanding Research Contribution Award from the NY State Psychological Association. Locally, he was awarded with the John Romano Award from the Mental Health Association of Rochester/Monroe Country and the Community Volunteer Service Award from Compeer. At the University of Rochester he was also honored with the University of Rochester Graduate Teaching Award. In addition to receiving many awards, in 1977 the Society for Community Research and Action (APA Division 27) created the Emory L. Cowen Dissertation Award for the Promotion of Wellness. This is awarded to the best dissertation within the range of topics that characterized Cowen's research program in wellness and prevention.

Cowen spread his influence through conceptual, empirical, and human service advances in the field. He touched the lives of the children he researched and his colleagues, students, friends and family. Cowen's research program spanned decades and his influence certainly surpasses his death from leukemia in 2000 (Sarason, 2001). George Albee, a pioneer in primary prevention has described Cowen as, “the tallest oak in the forest of prevention- sturdy, productive, deeply-rooted, and a guide to those unsure of their way. When the history of prevention is written a hundred years hence, Cowen's ideas, achievements, and influence will lead all the rest” (Albee, 2000).

== Program development ==
The most influential and important contribution of Cowen's career was the Primary Mental Health Program. Cowen and colleagues developed the well-defined and researched program to initiate early detection of emotional disturbances in the school setting and implement secondary prevention using non-professionals in the context of school. The project began in a single Rochester, New York elementary school in 1957 and was eventually implemented in over 500 school districts around the world. This helped shift mental health concepts and programs in more preventative directions.

Broadly, Cowen and colleagues created programs that target three areas: 1) training skills and competencies known to promote wellness, 2) modifying educational practices to enhance children's adaptation skills, and 3) helping children at risk cope with stressors (Emory L. Cowen, 1990). A detailed review of the program was documented and published in the book School Based Prevention for Children at Risk: The Primary Mental Health Project.

== Research ==
Cowen's research mapped nicely onto the programs he studied and implemented. In contrast, the research conducted by Cowen as a graduate student was different from the research he pursued later in life. In graduate school he began with topics such as nondirective therapy, threat rigidity, and problem solving. Although these topics seem unrelated to his work, that was far from the case. On one hand, collaboration during graduate school with William Cruickshank (Cowen, & Cruickshank, 1948; Cruickshank & Cowen, 1948) mirrored the intent of the work he later pursued in the evaluation of children. Maybe most importantly, his studies graduate school lead to two noteworthy realizations, which became the foundation for what colored the rest of his career.

One of his early realizations was based on his experience with nondirective therapy. He became convinced there were limitations to psychotherapy. He acknowledged that the current concepts in mental health were focused on end-state conditions (Cowen, 1973). That is, current interventions focused on undoing psychological damage once it passed a critical point. He found this method frustrating, costly, time-consuming, culture-bound, unavailable, and ineffective with large portions of society. This idea, spawned through his observations and frustrations in graduate school, lead to his widespread research and initiatives to effectively reach many more individuals. The shift in his approach was captured in a response to a request from the Annual Review of Psychology to write a review on psychotherapy in the mid-1960s. Cowen reported that despite his research and experience in psychotherapy, he refused to write a review. He saw one-on-one initiatives as an ineffective method for treating mental illness out of existence. Rather, he saw a more vital and effective way of approaching these problems through the schools and community (Albee, 2000). The limitations of psychotherapy effectively pushed Cowen to develop what is now known as community psychology.

Cowen's second realization was fostered by George G. Thompson at Syracuse University. It was then that he conceived his affinity for scientific inquiry, which was consistently reflected throughout his career. Cowen went on to value data and to push the implications of his findings. This encouraged the development and creation of new ways f thinking, which is exactly what he went on to do. His scientific inquiry directly influenced his basic research and indirectly strengthened his impact on the field as a whole and to those individuals he served. Not only did he implement programs that he thought would be more effective, but he made great efforts to evaluate the effectiveness of the programs he implemented. This constant evaluation is documented in both article (Cowen, Gesten, & Wilson, 1979) and book publications (Cowen et al., 1996).
Overall, the evolution of his research and publication history reflects the trajectory of his thought over his lifetime. From the beginning, in the 1950s until his death he published related to PMHP. Publications included books, such as New Ways in School and Mental Health (1975) and School Based Prevention for Children at Risk: the Primary Mental Health Program (1996), an article in Annual Review of Psychology (Cowen, 1973), and numerous journal articles (Cowen, Gesten, & Wilson, 1979; Farie, Cowen, & Smith, 1986)

During the late 1970s to the 1980s his focus was on the primary prevention of mental health, as captured by publication titles such as The Wooing of Primary Prevention (Cowen, 1980). He explored and documented the opportunities and barriers in the primary prevention movement (Cowen, 1977; Cowen, 1982a), proposed suggestions for models of primary prevention in mental health (Cowen, 1982b; Cowen, 1984), and also provided guides for training in primary prevention (Cowen, 1984b; Price, Cowen, Lorion, & Ramos-McKay, 1988). When evaluating his research during this period, his sole and remarkable influence on primary prevention at the time is reinforced by the number of first and single author publications on primary prevention. It is also evident that he had a collaborative relationship with Ellis L. Gesten, more than one third of Cowen's publications from 1977 to 1987 were coauthored by Gesten (21 out of 62). Joint publications covered a range of topics covering children's adjustment problems and potential layperson caregivers (i.e. barbers). Cowen contributed to the field of community psychology through his own individual ideas and through collaborations.

From the late 1980s until his death, his publications moved away from primary prevention broadly, and towards targeting approaches that specifically contribute to primary prevention, such as competence, resilience, and empowerment. In 1981, he published an article with Weissberg and others regarding competence building interventions in the elementary schools. Publications on competence building interventions continued (Cowen, 1985), as well as correlates of perceived competence in at risk youth (Wyman, Cowen, Hightower, & Pedro-Carroll, 1985). His focus on resilience is seen in his study of resilient children (Cowen & Work, 1988; Cowen, Wyman, Work, & Parker, 1990), correlates of psychological resilience (Wyman, Cowen, Work, & Parker, 1991), and a step further into the specific predictors of resilience (Wyman, et al., 1992). Cowen's publications increasingly focused on the promotion of factors that contribute to overall wellness (Cowen, 1994; Cowen, 2000).

Along the trajectory of Cowen's research, he constantly raised new questions and created new avenues. He was not only quick to consider and explore the potential of an idea or thought, but also the concomitant limitations, which contributed significantly to his pioneering influence in community psychology. As such, it is only fitting that in the final pages of The Promotion of Children and Wellness (2000), which was written in his honor, Cowen contributed a chapter that critically assessed the future and shortcomings of wellness and preventions. His research, programs, and overall influence has left lasting impression on the field of psychology.

== Graduate students ==
Cowen mentored Olivia Hooker.

== Publications ==
- Cowen, E. L. (1954). "The 'negative self-concept' as a personality measure". Journal of Consulting Psychology. 18 (2): 138–142. doi:10.1037/h0059364. PMID 13152250.
- Cowen, E. L. (1973). "Social and community interventions". Annual Review of Psychology. 24 (1): 423–472. doi:10.1146/annurev.ps.24.020173.002231. PMID 4579496.
- Cowen, E. L. (1975). New Ways in School Mental Health: Early Detection and Prevention of School Maladaptation. New York, NY: Human Sciences Press. ISBN 087705214X.
- Cowen, E. L. (1977). "Baby-steps toward primary prevention". American Journal of Community Psychology. 5 (1): 1–22. doi:10.1007/BF00884781. PMID 855833. S2CID 43677199.
- Cowen, E. L. (1980). "The wooing of primary prevention". American Journal of Community Psychology. 8 (3): 258–284. PMID 7416089.
- Cowen, E. L. (1982a). "Primary prevention research: Barriers, needs and opportunities". The Journal of Primary Prevention. 2 (3): 131–137. doi:10.1007/BF01324206. PMID 24301203.
- Cowen, E. L. (1982b). "The Special Number: A complete roadmap. Primary prevention research in mental health". American Journal of Community Psychology. 10 (3): 239–250. doi:10.1007/BF00896492. PMID 7113988. S2CID 143535032.
- Cowen, E. L. (1984a). "A general structural model for primary prevention program development in mental health". The Personnel and Guidance Journal. 62 (8): 485–490. doi:10.1111/j.2164-4918.1984.tb00261.x.
- Cowen, E. L. (1984b). "Training for primary prevention in mental health". American Journal of Community Psychology. 12 (2): 253–259. doi:10.1007/BF00897049. PMID 6731377. S2CID 46028010.
- Cowen, E. L. (1985). "Person-centered approaches to primary prevention in mental health: Situation-focused and competence-enhancement". American Journal of Community Psychology. 13 (1): 31–48. doi:10.1007/BF00923258. PMID 3969966. S2CID 40714081.
- Cowen, E. L. (1994). "The enhancement of psychological wellness: Challenges and opportunities". American Journal of Community Psychology. 22 (2): 149–179. doi:10.1007/BF02506861. PMID 7977176. S2CID 26462725.
- Cowen, E. L. (2000). "Community psychology and routes to psychological wellness". Handbook of Community Psychology. Springer. pp. 79–99.
- Cowen, E. L.; Chinsky, J. M.; Rappaport, J. (1980). "The 1979 Division 27 Award for Distinguished Contributions to Community Psychology and Community Mental Health: Emory L. Cowen". American Journal of Community Psychology. 8 (3): 253–284. doi:10.1007/BF00894342. PMID 6998279. S2CID 36451532.
- Cowen, E. L.; Combs, A. W. (1950). "Follow-up study of 32 cases treated by nondirective psychotherapy". The Journal of Abnormal and Social Psychology. 45 (2): 232–258. doi:10.1037/h0053590. PMID 15415186.
- Cowen, E. L.; Cruickshank, W. M. (1948). "Group therapy with physically handicapped children. II: Evaluation". Journal of Educational Psychology. 39 (5): 281–297. doi:10.1037/h0056681.
- Cowen, E. L.; Gesten, E. L.; Wilson, A. B. (1979). "The Primary Mental Health Project (PMHP): evaluation of current program effectiveness". American Journal of Community Psychology. 7 (3): 293–303. doi:10.1007/BF00890693. PMID 495575. S2CID 44502496.
- Cowen, E. L.; Hightower, A. D.; Pedro-Carroll, J. L.; Work, W. C.; Wyman, P. A.; Haffey, W. G. (1996). School-based prevention for children at risk: The primary mental health project. Washington, DC. ISBN 978-1-55798-353-4.
- Cowen, E. L.; Thompson, G. G. (1951). "Problem solving rigidity and personality structure". The Journal of Abnormal and Social Psychology. 46 (2): 165–176. doi:10.1037/h0059580. PMID 14840998.
- Cowen, E. L.; Work, W. C. (1988). "Resilient children, psychological wellness, and primary prevention". American Journal of Community Psychology. 16 (4): 591–607. doi:10.1007/BF00922773. PMID 3055936. S2CID 36607923.
- Cowen, E. L.; Wyman, P. A.; Work, W. C.; Parker, G. R. (1990). "The Rochester Child Resilience Project: Overview and summary of first year findings". Development and Psychopathology. 2 (2): 193–212. doi:10.1017/S0954579400000705. S2CID 146360468.
- Cruickshank, W. M.; Cowen, E. L. (1948). "Group therapy with physically handicapped children. I: Report of study". Journal of Educational Psychology. 39 (4): 193–215. doi:10.1037/h0063012.
- Price, R. H.; Cowen, E. L.; Lorion, R. P.; Ramos-McKay, J. (1988). Fourteen ounces of prevention: A casebook for practitioners. Washington, DC: American Psychological Association. ISBN 1557980365.
- Farie, A. M.; Cowen, E. L.; Smith, M. (1986). "The development and implementation of a rural consortium program to provide early, preventive school mental health services". Community Mental Health Journal. 22 (2): 94–103. doi:10.1007/BF00754548. PMID 3743007. S2CID 23954302.
- Weissberg, R. P.; Gesten, E. L.; Carnrike, C. L.; Toro, P. A.; Rapkin, B. D.; Davidson, E.; Cowen, E. L. (1981). "Social problem-solving skills training: A competence-building intervention with second-to fourth-grade children". American Journal of Community Psychology. 9 (4): 411–423. doi:10.1007/BF00918172. S2CID 143824880.
- Wyman, P. A.; Cowen, E. L.; Work, W. C.; Parker, G. R. (1991). "Developmental and family milieu correlates of resilience in urban children who have experienced major life stress". American Journal of Community Psychology. 19 (3): 405–426. doi:10.1007/BF00938033. PMID 1892136. S2CID 12957097.
- Wyman, P. A.; Cowen, E. L.; Work, W. C.; Raoof, A.; Gribble, P. A.; Parker, G. R.; Wannon, M. (1992). "Interviews with children who experienced major life stress: Family and child attributes that predict resilient outcomes". Journal of the American Academy of Child & Adolescent Psychiatry. 31 (5): 904–910. doi:10.1097/00004583-199209000-00019. PMID 1400124.
- Wyman, P. A.; Cowen, E. L.; Hightower, A. D.; Pedro-Carroll, J. L. (1985). "Perceived competence, self-esteem, and anxiety in latency-aged children of divorce". Journal of Clinical Child Psychology. 14 (1): 20–26. doi:10.1207/s15374424jccp1401_4.
