= Stephen R Lankton =

American psychotherapist

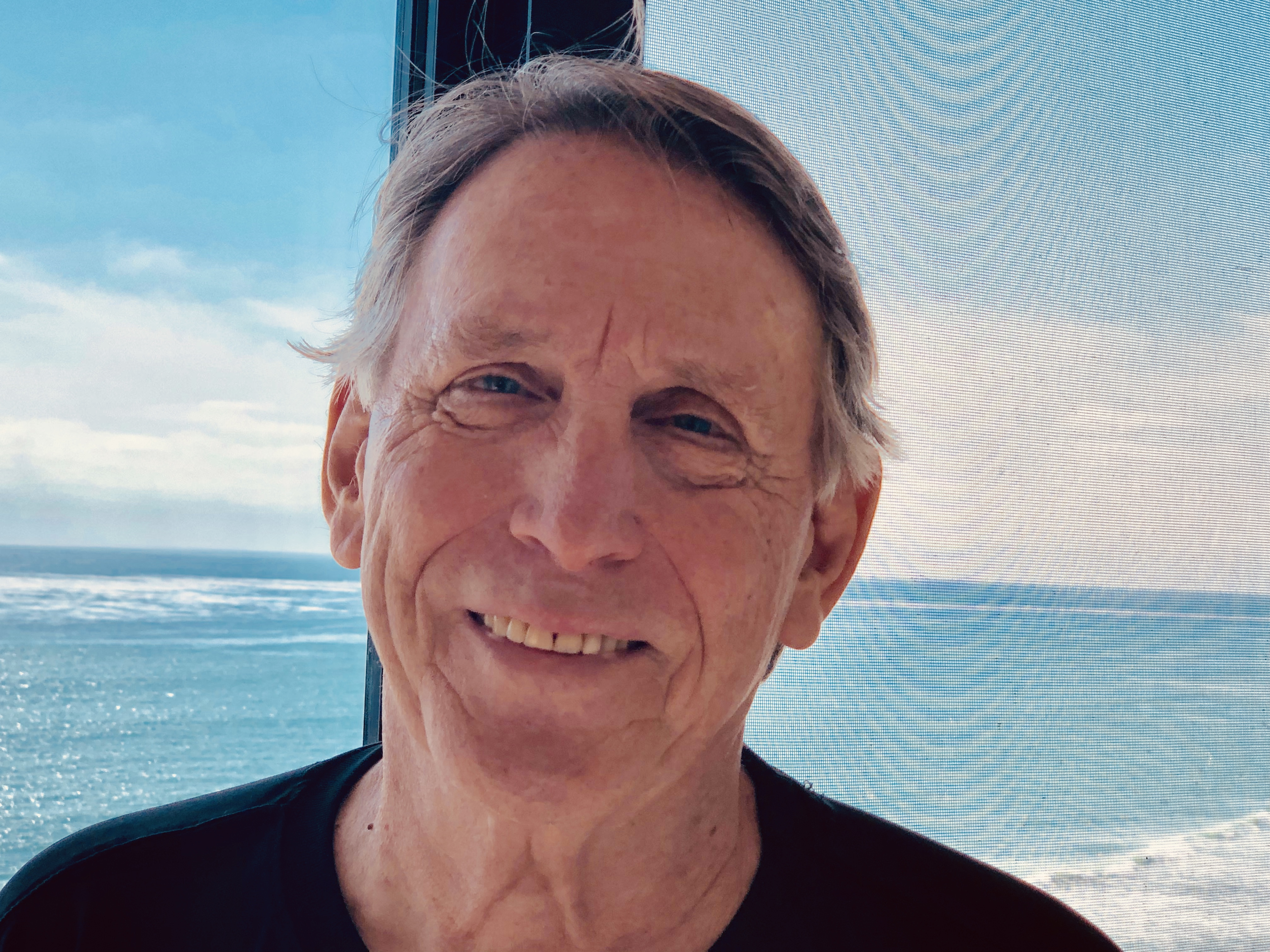
Stephen Lankton, MSW Psychotherapist & Trainer

Stephen R. Lankton, MSW, DAHB (born 29 May 1947) is a psychotherapist, consultant, and trainer. He is the current Editor-in-Chief of the American Journal of Clinical Hypnosis (2005–2025). He is a recipient of the American Society of Clinical Hypnosis' "Lifetime Achievement Award" and “Irving Sector Award for Advancement of the Field of Hypnosis”. as well as the Milton H. Erickson Foundation “Lifetime Achievement Award for Outstanding Contributions to the Field of Psychotherapy.”

Lankton is a Diplomate and Past-President of the American Hypnosis Board for Clinical Social Work and a Fellow and former Approved Consultant of the American Society of Clinical Hypnosis. He has been a Fellow and Approved Supervisor of the American Association of Marriage and Family Therapy and Diplomate of the American Psychotherapy Association.

He served as a Faculty Associate at Arizona State University, undergraduate school and Graduate School of Social Work (2004–2013). He was an Appointee to the Arizona State Board of Behavior Health Examiners Social Work Credentialing Committee (2008–2015) and was the Chair of the Arizona State Board of Behavioral Health Examiners (2012–2015).

A psychotherapist in private practice in Phoenix, Arizona, Lankton conducts training workshops and keynote addresses internationally. He continues to train as a teaching faculty of the Milton H. Erickson Foundation, Inc.’s Intensive Workshops, Congresses, and conferences.

== Biography ==
Stephen Lankton was born in Lansing, Michigan where he attended public schools, and lived in the rural area outside of the city. His father was a life-long employee of General Motor, Fisher Body Division and his mother was an accomplished seamstress and a homemaker. He also had one sister, Jo Ann, who was instrumental in guiding him to higher educational goals. He lived in Michigan until 1980 and relocated to Pensacola, Florida until 2001. He now lives in Phoenix, Arizona with his wife Julie, and his grown children and grandchildren work and live out of state.

== Training Background ==
Originally majoring in mathematics and electrical engineering, he become intensely interested in psychology and psychotherapy due to the combination of his part-time employment and an inspiring professor of an undergraduate psychology class. Switching majors, he received a Baccalaureate from Michigan State University in 1972 with a major in Social Science and four minors in Psychology, Anthropology, Linguistics, and History. He also acquired a secondary school teaching certificate. During this period, he worked part-time jobs as a youth outreach worker, a residential boy's camp counselor for pre-adjudicated juveniles, and participated as a volunteer in (at the time) the country's second-only suicide prevention center, the Listening Ear, in East Lansing, Michigan (1969–1972). He eventually became a center coordinator and authored, published, and distributed a city-wide guide to all community mental and public health resources. The training received during these jobs and extra-curricular largely shaped the direction of his later professional career.

He attended the University of Michigan, School of Social Work (1972–1974) where he studied with a simultaneous emphasis on both psychodynamic theory and behavior modification and received a master's degree in Social Work (1974). He concurrently participated weekly in an intensive post-graduate training program in Gestalt Therapy and Transactional Analysis (T.A.) at the Huron Valley Institute, Ann Arbor, Michigan (1971–1976). The training program famously provided a wide range of exposure to family therapies, body therapies, and communication-oriented therapies. He achieved a Clinical Membership in T.A. in 1975. During this period, he published papers on Transactional Analysis, and Bioenergetics.

Following graduate school, Lankton accepted employment at Family Services and Children's Aid in Jackson, Michigan (1974–1979) and obtained independent practice licenses in both Marriage and Family Therapy and Clinical Social Work. He concurrently consulted to the Crittenden Home, and organized and conducted a day-treatment center for individuals diagnosed with schizophrenia at the Community Mental Health Center in Jackson and conducted on-going therapy training groups wherein he invited specialists, including John Grinder, Ph.D., to teach topics such as NLP. During this time period he met Gregory Bateson, M.D., and Milton Erickson, M.D.

== Training with Milton H. Erickson, M.D. ==
Investigating how family communication and socialization is similar to hypnosis, he consulted with Gregory Bateson. Bateson pointed Lankton to seek training with Milton H. Erickson, M.D. This resulted in quarterly weeklong trips from Michigan to Phoenix to study with Erickson from mid-1975 to 1979. Lankton returned to Ann Arbor regularly after periodic visits with Dr. Erickson encouraging and inspiring many of the professionals in the Huron Valley Institute training program to also travel to Phoenix and train with Erickson. Such a large number of therapists continued to do so over the next few years that a memorial service for Dr. Erickson, attended by his son Lance, was held in Ann Arbor, in the week after Erickson's death in 1980.

Lankton's effort to promote, explain, and interpret Erickson's approach to hypnosis and therapy at the highest academic levels resulted in the inclusion of chapters in several well received scholarly publications. These include his chapters in the Oxford Handbook of Hypnosis; The Handbook of Clinical Hypnosis; and Handbook of Family Therapy Volume II; Social Workers’ Desk Reference; and The Handbook of Innovative Therapy; and several others.

Lankton was the founding Editor of the Ericksonian Monographs series of books from 1985 to 1995. His major publications include Practical Magic; The Answer Within; Enchantment and Intervention In Family Therapy; and Assembling Ericksonian Therapy; Tools of Intention, and others.

== Simultaneous work with corporations ==
He served as a behavior science expert in corporate consulting projects that have included the IRS, Xerox, American Express, New York State Tax and Finance, NY Welfare Department, Nortel, and other fortune 500 companies (1993–2000). He co-authored the Xerox 1998's Document Engineering Methodology that promoted a behaviorally driven interface-management/document-centered information engineering approach to enhance corporate profitability, accuracy, accountability, and efficiency.

== Publications ==
Lankton published many books and papers. Below is a selection of books.

- 2008. Tools of intention: Strategies that inspire change. Crown House Publications. ISBN 978-0-9823288-0-4.
- 2008/1983. The answer within: A clinical framework of Ericksonian hypnotherapy. With Carol Lankton. Crown House Publications. ISBN 978-184590121-9.
- 2007/1986. Enchantment and intervention in family therapy: Using metaphors in family therapy. With Carol Lankton. Crown Press. ISBN 978-184590083-0.
- 2004. Assembling Ericksonian therapy: The collected papers of Stephen Lankton. Zeig-Tucker. ISBN 1-932462-10-4.
- 2003/1980. Practical magic: A translation of basic neuro linguistic programming into clinical psychotherapy (Rev. Edition). Crown House. ISBN 1-904424-11-2.
- 1989. Tales of enchantment. With Carol Lankton. Taylor & Francis / Brunner-Routledge. ISBN 0-87630-504-4.
- 1988. A children's book to overcome Fears: The blammo - surprise book!. Brunner Mazel. ISBN 0-945354-11-8.
- 2017. Hypnotic Induction: Perspectives, Strategies, and Concerns. With V. K. Kumar. (Editors). Routledge.
- 1994. Ericksonian monographs: Number 10. Difficult contexts for therapy. With J. K. Zeig (Editors). Brunner Mazel. ISBN 0-87630-749-7.
- 1993. Ericksonian monographs: Number 9. Essence of single session success. With K. Erickson (Editors). Brunner Mazel. ISBN 0-87630-727-6.
- 2017/1991. Views on Ericksonian brief therapy, process and action: Number 8. With S. Gilligan & J. Zeig (Editors). Brunner Mazel. ISBN 0-87630-646-6 (hard); 978-1-138-00957-8.
- 1990. Ericksonian monographs: Number 7. Broader implications of Ericksonian therapy. (Editor). Brunner Mazel. ISBN 0-87630-582-6.
- 2014/1989. Ericksonian monographs: Number 6. Extrapolations: Demonstrations of Ericksonian therapy. With J. Zeig (Editors) Brunner Mazel. ISBN 978-1-138-00469-6.
- 1989. Ericksonian monographs: Number 5. Ericksonian hypnosis: Application, preparation, and research. Brunner Mazel. ISBN 0-87630-523-0.
- 1988. Developing Ericksonian psychotherapy: State of the arts. The proceedings of the third international congress on Ericksonian psychotherapy. With J. Zeig (Editors). Brunner Mazel. ISBN 0-87630-501-X.
- 2017/1988. Ericksonian monographs: Number 4. Research comparisons and medical applications. With J. Zeig (Editors). Brunner Mazel. ISBN 0-87630-510-9 (hard); 978-1-138-00458-0 (paper).
- 1988. Ericksonian monographs: Number 3. Special treatment populations. With J. Zeig (Editors). Brunner Mazel. ISBN 0-87630-494-3.
- 1987. Ericksonian monographs: Number 2. Central themes and underlying principles. (Editor). Brunner Mazel. ISBN 0-87630-470-6.
- 1985. Ericksonian monographs: Number 1. Elements and dimensions of an Ericksonian approach. (Editor). Brunner Mazel. ISBN 0-87630-411-0.
