= Milton H. Erickson =

American psychiatrist (1901–1980)

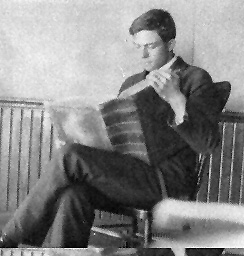
- Erickson before 1922
- Born: Milton Hyland Erickson; 5 December 1901; Aurum, Nevada, U.S.
- Died: 25 March 1980 (aged 78); Phoenix, Arizona, U.S.
- Education: University of Wisconsin-Madison
- Occupations: Psychiatrist and psychotherapist
- Spouse(s): Helen, Elizabeth

Milton Hyland Erickson (5 December 1901 – 25 March 1980) was an American psychiatrist and psychologist specializing in medical hypnosis and family therapy. He was the founding president of the American Society for Clinical Hypnosis. He is noted for his approach to the unconscious mind as creative and solution-generating. He is also noted for influencing brief therapy, strategic family therapy, family systems therapy, solution focused brief therapy, and neuro-linguistic programming.

== Early life and education ==
Biographical sketches have been presented in a number of resources, the earliest being by Jay Haley in Advanced Techniques of Hypnosis and Therapy which was written in 1968 and in collaboration with Erickson himself. Though they never met Erickson, the authors of The Worlds Greatest Hypnotists wrote a biography. The following information about his life is documented in that source.

Milton Hyland Erickson was the second child of nine of Albert and Clara Erickson. He was born in a mining camp in Aurum, Nevada where his father mined silver. The family moved to the farming community of Beaver Dam, Wisconsin when he was quite young and settled on a modest farm. The children (two boys and seven girls) all attended the one-room schoolhouse in nearby Lowell. The family farm demanded a great deal of physical labor.

Erickson was late in learning to speak and had difficulties in reading, which he described as dyslexia. He was also color blind and tone deaf. Later in life, when he explained what seemed to be extraordinary abilities, he stated that the disabilities (dyslexia, color blindness, being tone-deaf) helped him to focus on aspects of communication and behavior which most people overlooked. This is a typical example of emphasizing the positive, which is characteristic of his overall approach.

Though the family valued education, books were scarce. Erickson's desire to learn led him to repeatedly read the dictionary from front to back, along with the few other texts that the family treasured. He claimed to have overcome his dyslexia and described the pivotal moments in a paper entitled "Auto-hypnotic Experiences of Milton Erickson," which is found in The Collected Works of Milton H. Erickson, MD. He later characterized his early moments of creative change (which he described as a "blinding flash of light") as an early spontaneous auto-hypnotic experience.

Erickson became interested in hypnosis at an early age when a traveling entertainer passed through the area. According to his later description, he felt that hypnosis was too powerful a tool to be left to entertainers. He decided to bring this tool into the realm of scientific evaluation as well as into the practice of medicine. Erickson already admired the local community doctor and had committed himself to becoming a physician.

At age 17, he contracted polio which left him with additional lifelong disabilities. Having long been interested in hypnosis, the year of his recovery gave him the opportunity to explore the potential of self-healing through hypnosis. He began to recall "body memories" of the muscular activity of his own body. By concentrating on these memories, he claimed to have learned to tweak his muscles and to regain control of parts of his body, to the point where he was eventually able to talk and use his arms. Still unable to walk, he claimed to have trained his body by embarking on a thousand-mile canoe trip with only a few dollars, following which he was able to walk with a cane. He continued to use a cane throughout his adult life, requiring a wheelchair only in his last decade of life. Erickson attributed his own self-healing to giving him additional insight into hypnosis.

After recovering his ability to walk Erickson attended the University of Wisconsin-Madison, where he attained graduate degrees in both psychology and medicine. There he also embarked on formal studies of hypnosis in the laboratory of Clark Hull. However, because his ideas were somewhat different from Hull's, Erickson independently embarked upon rigorous scientific explorations regarding the nature of hypnosis. He received his M. D. degree from the University of Wisconsin School of Medicine with an emphasis on Neurology and Psychiatry in 1928. Between 1929 and 1948, Erickson then took a series of positions at state hospitals that facilitated active research. He continued research in hypnosis as he refined his practical therapeutic skills. He was already a prolific writer focusing primarily on case studies and experimental work. These earlier writings greatly advanced the general understanding of hypnosis and are included in The Collected Works of Milton Erickson, M.D.

During WWII, Erickson conducted physical and mental examinations of soldiers. Eventually the U.S. intelligence services asked him to meet with other experts in an effort to better understand the psychological and mental factors involved in communications relating to combat. In this capacity, Margaret Mead and Gregory Bateson were among those with whom Erickson worked and with whom he developed lifelong friendships. Over the subsequent decades these scholars collaborated on numerous projects.

In his late 40s Erickson developed post-polio syndrome. This resulted in additional muscle loss and pain. At that time Erickson, his wife Elizabeth, and his family of five children left Detroit and his position at Eloise State Hospital and relocated in Phoenix, Arizona, where they believed the weather conditions would be conducive to his healing. There Erickson established himself in private practice, working out of his home for the remainder of his life.

In Phoenix, Erickson became active in the Society for Clinical and Educational Hypnosis (SCEH). This organization promoted research and taught physicians how to use clinical hypnosis. Due to personality clashes and strong feelings regarding the most effective ways in which to bring clinical hypnosis into the hands of practicing physicians and dentists, Erickson broke away from the SCEH and formed the American Society of Clinical Hypnosis (ASCH) in July 1957. For a decade he was the founding editor of the American Journal of Clinical Hypnosis and had at least one article in every issue. He dedicated the next two decades of his life to professional writing, teaching other professionals, and maintaining a private practice. This was a productive period during which he developed and refined his own unique style of hypnotherapy, which caught the attention of other notables.

His ongoing relationship with Gregory Bateson led some to take an interest in Erickson's unique communication skills and therapeutic approaches. In 1973 Jay Haley published Uncommon Therapy, a book that first brought Erickson and his approaches to the attention of those outside the clinical hypnosis community. Erickson's fame and reputation spread rapidly, and so many people wished to meet him that he began holding teaching seminars. These continued until his death.

Throughout his professional career Erickson collaborated with a number of serious students. Colleagues who recognized the uniqueness and effectiveness of Erickson's approaches collected his publications into many volumes. His weekly workshops remained popular until his death. Towards the end of his life, Erickson's students began to formulate conceptual frameworks for his work and to explain and characterize it in their own way. Those efforts have influenced a vast number of psychotherapeutic directions, including brief therapy, family systems therapy, neuro-linguistic programming, among others.

Milton H. Erickson died in March 1980, aged 78, leaving behind his wife Elizabeth, four sons, four daughters.

== Hypnosis ==
=== Trance and the unconscious mind ===
Erickson's view of the unconscious mind was distinctly different from that of Freud whose ideas dominated the context of the times. Zeig quotes Erickson as describing "The unconscious mind is made up of all your learnings over a lifetime, many of which you have forgotten, but which serve you in your automatic functioning". Andre Weitzenhoffer points out: "The Ericksonian 'unconscious' lacks in particular the hostile and aggressive aspects so characteristic of Freud's system".

Erickson relied on a supposition of an active, significant, unconscious. It was Erickson's perspective that hypnosis provided a tool with which to communicate with the unconscious mind and access the reservoir of resources held within. He describes in a 1944 article on unconscious mental activity, "Since hypnosis can be induced and trance manifestations elicited by suggestion, the unwarranted assumption is made that whatever develops from hypnosis must be completely a result of suggestion, and primarily an expression of it. The hypnotized person remains an individual, and only certain limited general relationships and behavior are temporarily altered by hypnosis. Hypnosis is in fact the induction of a peculiar psychological state which permits subjects to reassociate and reorganize inner psychological complexities in a way suitable to the unique items of their own psychological experiences." In the same publication Erickson repeatedly comments about the autonomy of the unconscious mind and its capacity to solve problems.

The essential element of Erickson's jokes was not hostility, but surprise. It was not uncommon for him to slip indirect suggestions into a myriad of situations. He also included humor in his books, papers, lectures and seminars.

Early in his career Erickson was a pioneer in researching the unique and remarkable phenomena that are associated with that state, spending many hours at a time with individual subjects, deepening the trance. Erickson's work on depth of trance is detailed in his 1952 paper in which he provided history, justification, and ideas about its use. ("Trance states for therapeutic purposes may be either light or deep, depending on such factors as the patient's personality, the nature of his problem, and the stage of his therapeutic progress".)

Where traditional hypnosis is authoritative and direct and often encounters resistance in the subject, Erickson's approach is permissive, accommodating and indirect.

=== Techniques ===
While Erickson explored a vast arena of induction methodologies and techniques of suggestions, there are certain areas where his name is known as key in the development or popularity of the approaches. He used direct and indirect approaches, though he is most known for his indirect and permissive suggestion techniques.

=== Indirect suggestions ===
Erickson maintained that it was not consciously possible to instruct the unconscious mind, and that authoritarian suggestions were likely to be met with resistance. The unconscious mind responds to opportunity, metaphors, symbols, and contradictions. Therefore, effective hypnotic suggestion should be "artfully vague," leaving space for the subject to fill in the gaps with their own unconscious understandings – even if they do not consciously grasp what is happening. He developed both verbal and non-verbal techniques and pioneered the idea that the common experiences of wonderment, engrossment and confusion are, in fact, just kinds of trance. An excellent example of this can be viewed in the documentary film.

=== Metaphor ===
Erickson sometimes instructed people to climb a mountain or visit a botanical garden. His narrative and experiential metaphors are explored extensively in Sydney Rosen's My Voice Will Go With You, but an example is given in the first chapter of David Gordon's book Phoenix. The following quotes Erickson:

I was returning from high school one day and a runaway horse with a bridle on sped past a group of us into a farmer's yard looking for a drink of water. The horse was perspiring heavily. And the farmer didn't recognize it so we cornered it. I hopped on the horse's back. Since it had a bridle on, I took hold of the tick rein and said, "Giddy-up." Headed for the highway, I knew the horse would turn in the right direction. I didn't know what the right direction was. And the horse trotted and galloped along. Now and then he would forget he was on the highway and start into a field. So I would pull on him a bit and call his attention to the fact the highway was where he was supposed to be. And finally, about four miles from where I had boarded him, he turned into a farmyard and the farmer said, "So that's how that critter came back. Where did you find him?" I said, "About four miles from here." "How did you know you should come here?" I said, "I didn't know. The horse knew. All I did was keep his attention on the road."

=== Interspersal technique ===
Erickson describes hypnotic technique as a means to an end while psychotherapy addresses guidance of the subject's behaviors. As such, the same hypnotic technique can be applied towards diverse patient concerns. In his discussion of the applications of the interspersal technique, Erickson offers two case examples in which a similar application of the technique was made. One patient was suffering from intolerable malignant pain from a terminal condition, while the other subject was an intelligent though illiterate man who sought to relieve a disabling symptom of frequent urination. Erickson provides an interesting case write up for each of the cases chosen to illustrate his use of the interspersal technique. Erickson provides a transcript for the induction in which he interwove personalized therapeutic suggestion, selected specifically for the patient, within the hypnotic induction itself. The transcript offered illustrates how easily hypnotherapeutic suggestions can be included in the trance induction along with trance-maintenance suggestions. In the follow-up case discussions Erickson credits the patients' positive responses to the receptivity of their unconscious minds: they knew why they were seeking therapy, they were desirous of benefiting from suggestions. Erickson goes on to state that one should also give recognition to the readiness with which one's unconscious mind picks up clues and information. Erickson stated that "Respectful awareness of the capacity of the patient's unconscious mind to perceive the meaningfulness of the therapist's own unconscious behavior is a governing principle in psychotherapy. The patient's unconscious mind is listening and understanding much better than is possible for his conscious mind".

=== Confusion technique ===
"In all my techniques, almost all, there is a confusion". – Milton H. Erickson

Erickson describes the confusion technique of hypnotic induction that he developed as being done either through pantomime or through plays on words. Spoken to attentive listeners with complete earnestness, a burden of constructing a meaning is placed upon the subject, and before they can reject it another statement can be made to hold their attention. One example is offered in which he uses verb tenses to keep the subject "…in a state of constant endeavor to sort out the intended meaning". He offers the following example: One may declare so easily that the present and the past can be so readily summarized by the simple statement "That which is now will soon be yesterday's future even as it will be tomorrow's was. Thus the past, the present, and the future all used in reference to the reality of today". Erickson describes the second element of confusion to be the inclusion of irrelevancies and non-sequiturs. Taken in context these verbal distractions are confusing and lead progressively to the subject's earnest desire for and an actual need to receive some communication they can readily understand. A primary consideration of the confusion technique is the consistent maintenance of a general causal but definitely interested attitude and speaking in a gravely earnest and intent manner expressive of a certain utterly complete expectation of the subject's understanding. Erickson wrote several articles detailing the technique and results that can be achieved. This succinct overview comes from a 1964 article, one of several detailing the technique, the justification and the responses that could be achieved.

=== Handshake induction ===
Erickson describes the routine as follows:

- Initiation: When I begin by shaking hands, I do so normally. The "hypnotic touch" then begins when I let loose. The letting loose becomes transformed from a firm grip into a gentle touch by the thumb, a lingering drawing away of the little finger, a faint brushing of the subject's hand with the middle finger – just enough vague sensation to attract the attention. As the subject gives attention to the touch of your thumb, you shift to a touch with your little finger. As your subject's attention follows that, you shift to a touch with your middle finger and then again to the thumb.
- This arousal of attention is merely an arousal without constituting a stimulus for a response.
- The subject's withdrawal from the handshake is arrested by this attention arousal, which establishes a waiting set, and expectancy.
- Then almost, but not quite simultaneously (to ensure separate neural recognition), you touch the under-surface of the hand (wrist) so gently that it barely suggests an upward push. This is followed by a similar utterly slight downward touch, and then I sever contact so gently that the subject does not know exactly when – and the subject's hand is left going neither up nor down, but cataleptic.
- Termination: If you don't want your subject to know what you are doing, you simply distract their attention, usually by some appropriate remark, and casually terminate. Sometimes they remark, "What did you say? I got absentminded there for a moment and wasn't paying attention to anything." This is slightly distressing to the subjects and indicative of the fact that their attention was so focused and fixated on the peculiar hand stimuli that they were momentarily entranced, so they did not hear what was said
- Utilization: Any utilization leads to increasing trance depth. All utilization should proceed as a continuation of extension of the initial procedure. Much can be done nonverbally. For example, if any subjects are just looking blankly at me, I may slowly shift my gaze downward, causing them to look at their hand, which I touch and say "Look at this spot." This intensifies the trance state. Then, whether the subjects are looking at you or at their hand, or just staring blankly, you can use your left hand to touch their elevated right hand from above or the side – so long as you merely give the suggestion of downward movement. Occasionally a downward nudge or push is required. If a strong push or nudge is required, check for anesthesia.

=== Hand levitation ===
The nature of the induction is for the hypnotherapist to repeatedly suggest a lightness in the hand, which results in a dissociative response and the hand elevating unconsciously. Erickson was the first to describe the hand levitation method of induction, described as being broadly applicable.

Weitzenhoffer describes the technique as broadly applicable, quoting Lewis Wolberg's opinion that the hand levitation method of induction is "the best of all induction procedures. It permits the participation in the induction process by the patient and lends itself to non-directive and analytic techniques ... It is however, the most difficult of methods and calls for greater endurance on the part of the hypnotist".

=== Resistance ===
In the book Uncommon Therapy, Jay Haley identified several strategies that appeared repeatedly in Erickson's therapeutic approach. For Erickson, the classic therapeutic request to "Tell me everything about ...," was both aggressive and disrespectful. Instead he would ask the resistant patient to withhold information and only to tell what they were ready to reveal:

[Erickson] "I usually say, "There are a number of things that you don't want me to know about, that you don't want to tell me. There are a lot of things about yourself that you don't want to discuss, therefore let's discuss those that you are willing to discuss." She has blanket permission to withhold anything and everything. But she did come to discuss things. And therefore, she starts discussing this, discussing that. And it's always "Well, this is all right to talk about." And before she's finished, she has mentioned everything. And each new item – "Well, this really isn't so important that I have to withhold it. I can use the withholding permission for more important matters." Simply a hypnotic technique. To make them respond to the idea of withholding, and to respond to the idea of communicating."

Some people might react to a direction by thinking "Why should I?" or "You can't make me." This is called a "polarity response" because it motivates the subject to consider the polar opposite of the suggestion. The conscious mind recognizes negation in speech ("Don't do X") but according to Erickson, the unconscious mind pays more attention to the "X" than the injunction "Don't do." Thus, Erickson used this as the basis for suggestions that deliberately played on negation and tonally marked the important wording, to provide that whatever the client did, it would be beneficial: "You don't have to go into a trance, so you can easily wonder about what you notice no faster than you feel ready to become aware that your hand is slowly rising."

=== Double bind ===
Providing a worse alternative (The 'Double Bind') – Example: "Do you want to go into a trance now, or later?" The 'double bind' is a way of overloading the subject with two options, the acceptance of either of which represents acceptance of a therapeutic suggestion.

Erickson provides the following examples: "My first well-remembered intentional use of the double bind occurred in early boyhood. One winter day, with the weather below zero, my father led a calf out of the barn to the water trough. After the calf had satisfied its thirst, they turned back to the barn, but at the doorway the calf stubbornly braced its feet, and despite my father's desperate pulling on the halter, he could not budge the animal. I was outside playing in the snow and, observing the impasse, began laughing heartily. My father challenged me to pull the calf into the barn. Recognizing the situation as one of unreasoning stubborn resistance on the part of the calf, I decided to let the calf have full opportunity to resist, since that was what it apparently wished to do. Accordingly, I presented the calf with a double bind by seizing it by the tail and pulling it away from the barn, while my father continued to pull it inward. The calf promptly chose to resist the weaker of the two forces and dragged me into the barn".

=== Shocks and ordeals ===
Erickson is famous for pioneering indirect techniques, but his shock therapy tends to get less attention. Erickson was prepared to use psychological shocks and ordeals in order to achieve given results: The ordeal process is different from other therapeutic techniques originated by Erickson. Extending the dissociative effects of paradox and non sequitur, wherein confusion is used only as an entry to a trance state, the technique of ordeal superimposes a distressing but achievable challenge over the therapeutic aim such that the achievement of the former implies a positive outcome in the latter. Hence ordeal therapy is not merely an induction technique but a theory of change. The therapist's task is to impose an ordeal, appropriate to the problem the person wishes to change, an ordeal more severe than the problem. The main requirement is that it will cause distress equal to or greater than that caused by the symptom. It is also best that the ordeal is good for the person. The ordeal must have another characteristic: it must be something the person can do. It must be of such a nature that the therapist can easily say "This won't violate any of your moral standards and is something you can do". The final characteristic is that it should not harm anyone else. One final aspect of the ordeal is that sometimes the person must go through it repeatedly to recover from the symptom.

=== Influence on others ===
One of Erickson's first students and developers of his work was Jay Haley. Other important followers who studied directly with Erickson include Ernest Rossi, Stephen Gilligan, Jeffrey Zeig, Bill O'Hanlon, Michele Ritterman, Stephen Lankton, Richard Landis, Jane Parsons-Fein, Herb Lustig, Alex & Annellen Simpkins and Sidney Rosen.

Erickson eschewed rigid approaches to therapy and thus never accepted a binding framework or schematic set of procedures during his lifetime, though a multitude of other approaches grew from his perspective and practice. He had a strong influence on the diverse areas of Strategic therapy, Family Systems, Brief Therapy, Ordeal Therapy, Narrative Therapy, and Neuro-Linguistic Programming.

=== Ericksonian approaches ===
Following Erickson's death in 1980, The Erickson Foundation held a conference which at the time was the largest professional hypnosis conference ever held. Afterward, many participants began to teach Erickson's ideas in their own way. It was not until after Erickson's death that the word Ericksonian was used to describe his methodology. Over the decades that followed, there were various attempts to identify the key components that bring together the individual styles of an Ericksonian. In an attempt to identify the key elements of Erickson's work, Stephen Lankton contributed an extensive overview of Erickson's ideas and techniques which he referred to as the "Ericksonian Footprint". More recently, the development of Ericksonian Core Competencies spearheaded by Dan Short and Scott Miller defines Ericksonian approaches in a manner that makes it amenable to evidence-based studies.

Lankton and Matthews state that perhaps Erickson's greatest contribution to psychotherapy was not his innovative techniques, but his ability to de-pathologize people and consider a patient's problematic behavior as indicative of a best choice available to the individual. His approach was to facilitate the patient's access to inner resources to solve the problems.

A 1954 article by Erickson describes his technique of utilizing a patient's own personality and ideas, "Doing it His Own Way", in which a patient requested hypnosis for the explicit purpose of ceasing his reckless driving, and the patient did not want psychotherapy for any other purpose. Erickson worked with him and provided a summary of the case, after carefully assessing the patient's potential for safe practices, as well as his motivation for change. The discussion of working with the patient while allowing him to guide his own healing is a clear example of the concept of utilization for which Erickson has become known. Another key principle that is associated with Erickson's techniques is described in his 1964 paper entitled the "Burden of Effective Psychotherapy" whereby he describes the essential nature of the investment of the subject in the experiential process of healing.

An entry in the American Psychological Association Dictionary of Psychology defines Ericksonian psychotherapy as a "form of psychotherapy in which the therapist works with the client to create, through hypnosis and specifically through indirect suggestion and suggestive metaphors and real life experiences, intended to activate previously dormant intra-psychic resources".

== Controversy ==
A colleague, friend and fellow researcher, André Weitzenhoffer, an author in the field of hypnosis himself, has criticized some ideas and influence of Erickson in various writings, such as his textbook The Practice of Hypnotism. Weitzenhoffer displays a clear and explicitly stated, opposition to Ericksonian hypnosis in his book, in favor of what he terms the semi-traditional, scientific, approach. For Erickson, the shift from conscious to unconscious functioning is the essence of trance. Nowhere in his writing however, can one find an explicit definition of the term "unconscious" or, for that matter, of "conscious".

This criticism persists among clinicians and researchers of today, not only about Erickson himself, but also about his followers. Nash and Barnier note that some clinicians, especially those working in the tradition of Milton Erickson may discount the importance of hypnotizability.

In a book largely complementary to the works of Erickson, Rosen alludes to the uncertainty that can result from his clinical demonstrations: "This has nevertheless raised the question of whether or not the patient is playing a role by pretending not to feel pain…" Erickson's daughter Roxanna Erickson-Klein, also a trained psychotherapist, validated this uncertainty about the completeness of Erickson's case reports and demonstrations. She added that although he tirelessly advocated scientific investigations of hypnosis and was a prolific writer on techniques, he often left details out of case reports that could have been meaningful to clinicians of today. More importantly, critics often overlook the context of the times. He was a physician who worked from a framework of a country doctor, and clinicians of today are hasty to judge by today's standards, while not taking into consideration the context of the times.

Self-professed "skeptical hypnotist," Alex Tsander, cited concerns in his 2005 book Beyond Erickson: A Fresh Look at "The Emperor of Hypnosis", the title of which alludes to Charcot's characterization in the previous century as "The Napoleon of the Neuroses." Tsander re-evaluates a swathe of Erickson's accounts of his therapeutic approaches and lecture demonstrations in the context of scientific literature on hypnotism and his own experience in giving live demonstrations of hypnotic technique. Emphasizing social-psychological perspectives, Tsander introduces an "interpretive filter" with which he re-evaluates Erickson's own accounts of his demonstrations and introduces prosaic explanations for occurrences that both Erickson and other authors tend to portray as remarkable.

In an audiotape that is attributed to him, Dharma Teacher Tenshin, Reb Anderson of the Zen tradition, has referred to Erickson as a "Magician/Healer." Zeig concurs that professional skepticism and education is paramount for the advancement of a discipline. He states "Among psychotherapists there are some who worship Erickson with a reverence that borders on idolatry. Every word, sentiment, opinion, or act is presumed to have an inspired meaning. Such deification rooted in expectation of timeless power and omnipotence can ultimately lead to disillusionment. Equally prejudiced are those who regard Erickson as a maverick whose egregious methods are a passing fancy that will eventually be consigned to the dustbin of outmoded schemes. [Both] these attitudes do injustice to a highly creative and imaginative original mind... A poignant criticism of Erickson's strategic therapy is that it is overvalued by those who believe that clever tactics can substitute for disciplined training."

== See also ==
- Amusia
- Attachment-based therapy – Psychological interventions
- Brief psychotherapy – Form of psychotherapy
- Color blindness – Decreased ability to see color or color differences
- Covert hypnosis – Pseudo-scientific intellectual framework
- Dyslexia – Learning disability affecting reading
- Family therapy – Field of psychology centered on families
- Hypnosis – State of increased suggestibility
- Hypnotherapy – Type of complementary and alternative medicine
- Methods of neuro-linguistic programming – Pseudo-scientific intellectual framework
- Neuro-linguistic programming – Pseudoscientific approach to psychotherapy
- Solution-focused brief therapy – Goal-directed approach to psychotherapy
