= Edwin K. Yager =

American psychologist and hypnotherapist

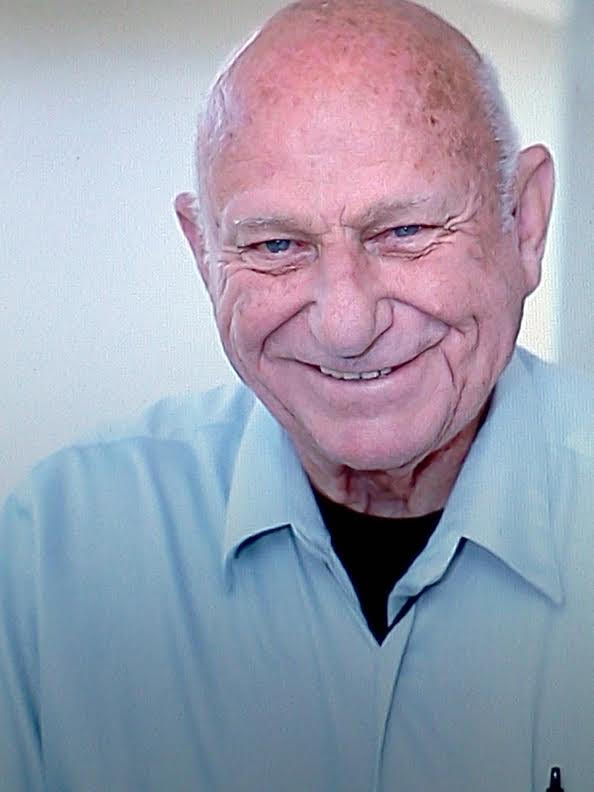
Edwin Yager

Edwin K. Yager (1925–2019) was an American psychologist and hypnotherapist. He contributed to the field of hypnosis with the Yager Code Therapy method he developed, also known as Yagerian Code.

== Life ==
Born as the first child and big brother of his 5 years younger sister, he had to take responsibility for the family at the age of 8 due to the early death of his father. He graduated from high school and served in the Navy on the USS Detroit, attended MSU in Dallas and earned a degree in electronics engineering. He developed an interest in hypnosis at a young age. He went on to study psychology, received his doctorate in 1980 and was a clinical professor in the Department of Psychiatry at the University of California, San Diego School of Medicine. He taught hypnosis and subliminal therapy, which later became known as Yager Therapy or the Yager Code.

== Yager Code ==
Edwin Yager used his understanding of engineering to develop subliminal therapy. He developed a uniform and structured list of questions that therapists working with his method could use to resolve the causes of illnesses, even if the patient was not rationally aware of them. This made it possible to prevent and also to work with patients who could not enter into the hypnotic trance. Together with Norbert Preetz, he spread the Yager Code in Germany and by 2022, more than 2,000 interested people and therapists had been trained in the method here alone.

== Teacher, author and mentor ==
For the last 40+ years of his professional life as a hypnotherapist, Yager has studied, practiced and taught the clinical use of hypnosis. He is certified as a "hypnosis consultant" by the American Society of Clinical Hypnosis and is a past president, board member and fellow of the San Diego Society of Clinical Hypnosis. He has taught and disseminated his therapy method in many countries around the world, including the U.S., Germany and other European countries, as well as in Iceland and Mexico. He is the author of several books and scientific publications.
