= Robert L. Moore (psychologist) =

American psychologist (1942–2016)

Robert Louis Moore (August 13, 1942 - June 18, 2016) was an American Jungian analyst and consultant in private practice in Chicago, Illinois. He was the Distinguished Service Professor of Psychology, Psychoanalysis and Spirituality at the Chicago Theological Seminary; a training analyst at the C.G. Jung Institute of Chicago; and director of research for the Institute for the Science of Psychoanalysis. Author and editor of numerous books in psychology and spirituality, he lectured internationally on his formulation of a Neo-Jungian paradigm for psychotherapy and psychoanalysis. He was working on Structural Psychoanalysis and Integrative Psychotherapy: A Neo-Jungian Paradigm at the time of his death.

== Life and career ==
Robert Louis Moore was born on August 13, 1942. His parents were Golden Franklin Moore Sr. and Margaret DePriest Moore. Moore has characterized his roots as "Cajun Catholic, Russian Jewish, and Scotch-Irish Protestant". He was married to Margaret Shanahan and lived in Chicago.

He earned a B.A. in Religion/Behavioral Science (1964, Hendrix College), an M.Th. in Psychology and Theology (1967, Southern Methodist University), an M.Th. in Counseling Psychology and Religion (1968, Duke University), followed by a M.A. and Ph.D in Psychology and Religion (in 1970 and 1975, University of Chicago). He earned certifications in Adlerian psychoanalysis (1983, Adler Institute) and Jungian psychology (1987, C. G. Jung Institute). Moore was deeply impressed with three University of Chicago professors, Mircea Eliade, Victor Turner, and Paul Tillich.

His employment history shows that he found a home at the Chicago Theological Seminary: 1973-1977: Western Illinois University, Assistant Professor of Philosophy and Religious Studies; 1977-1979: Chicago Theological Seminary, Assistant Professor of Psychology and Religion; 1979-1982: Associate Professor of Psychology and Religion; 1982-2005: Professor of Psychology, Psychoanalysis, and Spirituality; 2005–2016: Distinguished Service Professor of Psychology, Psychoanalysis, and Spirituality.

He was also employed from 1973 to 2016 in the private practice of psychotherapy; and from 1983 to 2016 in the private practice of psychoanalysis and as a consultant in organizational development and leadership and personal coaching.

Beginning in 2014 he had experienced a series of mini strokes and was subsequently suffering from vascular dementia. Reporting of his death in 2016 stated that he shot his wife and then himself in a murder-suicide.

== Contributions in perspective ==
=== Introduction ===
As a psychoanalytic scientist, Moore worked on decoding and mapping the deep structures of the human self. His work on ritual process and the masculine psyche is today in the forefront of theory in masculine psychology, spirituality, and initiation.

The Mythopoetic men's movement in the United States received a certain amount of notoriety for the practice of drumming. This practice is understood in terms of ritual processes. Many of our human ancestors worked out ritual processes, some of which did involve drumming and dancing and singing. From his cross-cultural study of ritual processes, Moore became convinced of the value of ritual process in actuating human potential. More specifically, he became convinced that ritual processes at their best can provide liminal experiences for certain participants that are instrumental in enabling those participants to actuate the potential of archetypal sources of energy (that is, sources of energy at the archetypal level of the human psyche).

Moore's views regarding ritual processes can be found in the transcribed lectures and essays published in The Archetype of Initiation: Sacred Space, Ritual Process, and Personal Transformation (2001), discussed below.

In addition to writing and editing numerous books, Moore frequently gave short courses at the C. G. Jung Institute of Chicago, many of which are available from the institute on audiotapes.

=== Five key books ===
Moore is probably most widely known as the senior author, with Douglas Gillette, of a series of five books on the in-depth structure of the male psyche, drawing on the account of the archetypal level of the human psyche developed by C. G. Jung.

1. King, Warrior, Magician, Lover: Rediscovering the Archetypes of the Mature Masculine is an introductory overview of four key sources of energy at the archetypal level of the human psyche.
2. The King Within: Accessing the King in the Male Psyche centers on the most important and most difficult source of energy for men to access.
3. The Warrior Within: Accessing the Knight in the Male Psyche centers on the source of energy that boys and men usually learn how to access relatively early in life, but it takes time and effort to learn how to access the optimally mature form of this source of energy in the human psyche.
4. The Magician Within: Accessing the Shaman in the Male Psyche centers on another form of energy that boys and men usually learn how to access at a relatively early age, but, once again, it takes time and effort to learn how to access the optimally mature form of this source of energy in the human psyche.
5. The Lover Within: Accessing the Lover in the Male Psyche centers on a very tricky source of energy in the human psyche.

According to Moore and Gillette, for each optimal orientation for each of these four key sources of energy, there are two corresponding "shadow" forms of the source of the energy—two ways for each of them to be misdirected for only one healthy or optimal way for each of them to be oriented. Just as the authors have given four key sources of energy in the human psyche very colorful names that seem to personify each source, so too the authors give each of the bipolar "shadow" forms very colorful names that seem to personify them.

Even though Moore stresses the positive potential of the archetypes of maturity, as he styles the healthy forms of the archetypes (as distinct from the "shadow" forms), he also stresses that archetypes are not friendly. By this he means that they can be dangerous because they can take over a person. So they are best approached with caution.

Moore has also noted that various forms of masculine behavior are immature, and so he thinks it is important for men today to develop guidelines for directing their own personal development and decision making.

=== Three recent books ===
The 21st century has seen the publication of three new books by Moore that carry forward certain dimensions of his thought:

- 2001: The Archetype of Initiation contains selected lectures and essays by Moore on sacred space, ritual process, and personal transformation. By the term "archetype" here Moore means the structure of personal initiation. By the term "initiation" here he means the processes whereby one leaves behind certain aspects of one's earlier life and moves toward a new constellation of one's life.
- 2002: The Magician and the Analyst is a short treatise on the archetype of the Magus in occult spirituality and Jungian analysis. One usually moves from one constellation of one's life to a new constellation with the assistance of someone else, or of several others. The person(s) who plays this pivotal enabling role for someone else is drawing on energies at the archetypal level of the human psyche that Moore refers to as Magician energies or Magus energies.
- 2003: Facing the Dragon: Confronting Personal and Spiritual Grandiosity is a collection of essays about various aspects of grandiosity. The point is to distinguish between grandiosity and true human greatness.

== Publications ==
=== Books by Moore ===
- John Wesley and Authority: A Psychological Perspective (Scholars Press, 1979).
- The Archetype of Initiation: Sacred Space, Ritual Process, and Personal Transformation (Xlibris, 2001).
- The Magician and the Analyst: The Archetype of the Magus in Occult Spirituality and Jungian Analysis (Xlibris, 2002).
- Facing the Dragon: Confronting Personal and Spiritual Grandiosity (Chiron Publications, 2003).

=== Book with J. Gordon Melton ===
- The Cult Experience: Responding to the New Religious Pluralism (Pilgrim Press, 1982).

=== Books with Douglas Gillette ===
- King, Warrior, Magician, Lover: Rediscovering the Archetypes of the Mature Masculine (HarperSanFrancisco, 1990).
- The King Within: Accessing the King in the Male Psyche (William Morrow, 1992).
- The Warrior Within: Accessing the Knight in the Male Psyche (William Morrow, 1992).
- The Magician Within: Accessing the Shaman in the Male Psyche (William Morrow, 1993).
- The Lover Within: Accessing the Lover in the Male Psyche (William Morrow, 1993).

=== Books edited by Moore ===
- Sources of Vitality in American Church Life (Exploration Press, 1978).
- Anthropology and the Study of Religion (with Frank Reynolds; Center for the Scientific Study of Religion, 1984).
- Jung's Challenge to Contemporary Religion (with Murray Stein; Chiron Publications, 1987).
- Carl Jung and Christian Spirituality (Paulist Press, 1988).
- Jung and Christianity in Dialogue: Faith, Feminism, and Hermeneutics (with Daniel J. Meckel; Paulist Press, 1990).
- Self and Liberation: The Jung-Buddhist Dialogue (with Daniel J. Meckel; Paulist Press, 1992).

Moore also edited, or served as series editor of, a number of books in the Jung and Spirituality Series published by Paulist Press.

- Carl Jung and Christian Spirituality, ed R. L. Moore.
- Jung and Christianity in Dialogue, eds R.L. Moore and Daniel J Meckel.
- Lord Of The Four Quarters, by John Weir Perry.
- Jung and Shamanism in Dialogue, by C. Michael Smith.
- Individuation and The Absolute, by Sean Kelly.
- Dancing Between The Worlds, by Fred R. Gufstason.
- In God's Shadow: The Collaboration of Victor White and C.G. Jung, by A. Lammers.
- Jesus' Parables by Robert Winterhalter, with George Fisk.
- The Unconscious Christian: Images Of God In Dreams, by James Hall.
