= Aurum, Nevada =

- Ghost town
- Location within Nevada
- Coordinates: 39°42′12″N 114°35′05″W
- Country: United States
- State: Nevada
- County: White Pine
- Elevation: 7,159 ft (2,182 m)
- GNIS feature ID: 862317

Aurum is a ghost town in White Pine County, Nevada, United States.

== History ==
Originally known as "Silver Canyon", after the nearby geographical feature, Aurum was founded as a mining community in 1878. When a post office opened on April 4, 1881, the community received its present name, Aurum. Aurum had two neighborhoods, defined by differing elevation. In the higher sections of the community, boarding houses accommodated miners working in the local area. Areas of the community with lower elevation contained mainly private residences, commercial businesses, and the post office. The higher-elevation neighborhood where the miners resided was referred to locally as "Doughburg." On February 11, 1884, an avalanche occurred in Silver Canyon, above the boarding house of the Sadie L Mine. Three people were killed. Two of the victims, H. W. Mickel, and Wallace McCrimmon, were buried at Aurum. The other victim, John Fox, was taken into Cherry Creek for burial.

Over the following decades, the community experienced multiple periods of boom and bust. During booms, the community's population rapidly swelled to hundreds of people. However, during busts, miners left, businesses closed, and the population rapidly dwindled. During one of these "busts", the population dropped to only one inhabitant - a local man named Simon Davis. Eventually, the mining activities in the area shut down permanently. The post office closed for the last time on May 31, 1938, and the area has been mostly uninhabited since.

The population was 10 in 1940.

== Notable people ==
- Milton H. Erickson, psychiatrist
