= Growing Generations =

American gestational surrogacy company

Growing Generations LLC
- Type: Private
- Industry: Assisted reproductive technology
- Founded: 1996, Los Angeles, California, United States
- Headquarters: California, United States
- Key people: Teo Martinez (chief executive officer), Erica Horton (president), Kim Bergman (senior partner), Stuart Bell (senior partner)
- Owner: North Star Fertility Partners
- Parent: North Star Fertility Partners LLC

Growing Generations, LLC is a U.S.-based company that provides gestational surrogacy, egg donation, and sperm donation coordination services. Founded in Glendale, California in 1996, the company was among the first surrogacy agencies in the United States to work with LGBTQ+ individuals and couples seeking to build families through assisted reproduction.

Growing Generations operates as a subsidiary of North Star Fertility Partners LLC, a Boston-based holding company within the Cortec Group portfolio.

== History ==
Growing Generations was established in 1996 in California as a limited liability company, with a focus on helping gay couples and single men to start their families. The company later expanded its services to support a broad range of intended parents. The company was also registered in West Virginia in 2010, and continues to operate under that jurisdiction. Psychologist, author, LGBTQ+ activist and surrogacy advocate Kim Bergman joined the company during its early stages, and later became co-owner.

In its early years, the company became one of the first surrogacy agencies in the United States to work openly with gay men seeking to become parents.

In 2003, it introduced an egg donation program that included video interviews as part of donor profiles to humanize the process of choosing a donor and provide donor-conceived people with insight into what their donor was like.

In 2006, the company began assisting HIV-positive men in having biological children through surrogacy.

In 2023, Growing Generations became part of North Star Fertility Partners, based in Boston, Massachusetts, joining a network of fertility and surrogacy organizations.

== Operations ==
Growing Generations provides coordination and support services for intended parents throughout the surrogacy and gamete donation process. Its services include matching intended parents with gestational surrogates or donors, coordinating with independent professionals such as attorneys, IVF physicians, obstetricians, delivery hospitals, escrow companies, and licensed mental health specialists.

The company assists intended parents through each stage of the surrogacy process, including match preparation and pre-screening, matching with a surrogate, medical screening with the chosen IVF provider, and coordination of legal contracts with independent attorneys. It also supports pregnancy preparation and monitoring with the intended parents’ selected IVF and OB-GYN professionals, as well as birth planning and post-birth arrangements, such as breast milk coordination when requested.

Growing Generations works with clients worldwide, coordinating surrogacy and gamete donation cases throughout the U.S. The company works with intended parents in all states; however, gestational surrogates participating in its program may not reside in Alaska, Indiana, Louisiana, Nebraska, New York, and Wyoming. The company facilitates arrangements governed by state-specific legal frameworks for surrogacy and assisted reproduction, including the use of pre- and post-birth parentage orders. Legal documentation is typically prepared and executed by independent attorneys representing the intended parents and surrogates.

Growing Generations is owned by North Star Fertility Partners LLC, a Delaware-registered entity.

As of 2025, Teo Martinez is chief executive officer, and Erica Horton is president. Senior partners include Kim Bergman and Stuart Bell.

As of 2025, the company had coordinated over 2,400 births through surrogacy and more than 1,000 donor cycles.

== Regulatory and professional affiliations ==
Growing Generations is licensed by the New York State Department of Health as a surrogacy agency (2024–present) and has been a member of the American Society for Reproductive Medicine (ASRM) since 2005. The company maintains documented screening protocols for prospective surrogates and donors, which include medical, psychological, and genetic evaluations conducted by independent specialists. The process involves reviewing applications for eligibility, conducting interviews, and educating candidates about the surrogacy process. It also includes medical record reviews by a maternal–fetal medicine specialist, criminal background checks, financial verifications, psychological testing by licensed mental health professionals, and insurance assessments carried out by brokers experienced in assisted reproduction. Growing Generations also coordinates evaluations of obstetricians and hospitals, and facilitates communication among medical, legal, and psychological professionals involved in the surrogacy process. The company manages appointment scheduling with IVF clinics, assists with travel arrangements, and coordinates hospital plans, including birth logistics.

== See also ==
- Surrogacy
- Egg donation
- Surrogate marriage
- Sexual surrogate
- Surrogacy laws by country
- Third-party reproduction
