= Zeita Merchant =

United States Coast Guard Rear Admiral

- Education: Tougaloo College, Bachelor's of Science (Biology); George Washington University, Master's of Public Administration
- Military career
- Allegiance: United States of America
- Branch: Coast Guard
- Service years: 1997-present
- Rank: Rear Admiral (Lower Half)
- Commands: 2016 Marine Safety Unit Chicago; 2024 U.S. Coast Guard Personnel Service Center; 2026 Commander of the U. S. Coast Guard East District
- Awards: 2018 Captain David H. Jarvis Inspirational Leadership Award

Zeita Merchant is the current Commander of the U. S. Coast Guard East District. In 2024 she became the first female African-American to be appointed rear admiral lower half in Coast Guard history.

== Education ==
Merchant graduated from Tougaloo College with a bachelor of science degree in biology. She also earned a master of public administration degree from George Washington University.

== Career ==
Merchant joined the Coast Guard in 1997 and stated the following about the organization's gender and race bias at the time: "Everywhere I served I saw other women but they were juniors, there were no senior African American women in the Coast Guard at that point in time. So I really couldn't see what I wanted to be".

In 2016, Merchant took command of Marine Safety Unit Chicago, becoming the first African-American woman to command a Prevention/Marine Safety Unit/Office in the Coast Guard. And was subsequently the commander of the U.S. Coast Guard Personnel Service Center.

In 2024 she became the first female African-American to be appointed rear admiral lower half in Coast Guard history.

== Awards ==
In 2018, Merchant was awarded the Captain David H. Jarvis Inspirational Leadership Award, making her the first African-American woman to be given this award.

On Veterans Day in 2021, Merchant received a Women in Service award from the American Red Cross.

== Military awards and decorations ==
Prevention Operations Ashore Insignia
Command Ashore Pin
Commandant Staff Badge

Legion of Meritwith 2 Gold Stars
Meritorious Service Medal Meritorious Service Medal with 2 Gold Stars and an Operational Device
Coast Guard Commendation Medal with 1 Silver Star and an Operational Device
Coast Guard Achievement Medal with 2 Gold Stars and an Operational Device
Commandant's Letter of Commendation Ribbon with 3 Gold Stars and an Operational Device
Presidential Unit Citation with Hurricane Device
DHS Outstanding Unit Award
Coast Guard Unit Commendation with Operational Device
Navy Meritorious Unit Commendation with 4 Gold Stars and an Operational Device
Coast Guard Meritorious Team Commendation with 3 Gold Stars and an Operational Device
National Defense Service Medal
Global War on Terrorism Service Medal
Armed Forces Service Medal
Humanitarian Service Medal with bronze service star
Military Outstanding Volunteer Service Medal with 2 bronze service stars
Transportation 9-11 Ribbon
Coast Guard Special Operations Service Ribbon with 3 bronze service stars
Coast Guard Rifle Marksmanship Ribbon
Coast Guard Pistol Marksmanship Ribbon

== Role model ==
One of Merchant's role models and mentors was Dr Olivia Hooker, who was the first African American woman to join the U.S. Coast Guard. Dr. Hooker joined the Coast Guard during World War II and the galley on the Coast Guard's Staten Island, New York base is named after her.
