= Norbert Preetz =

German psychologist and hypnotherapist

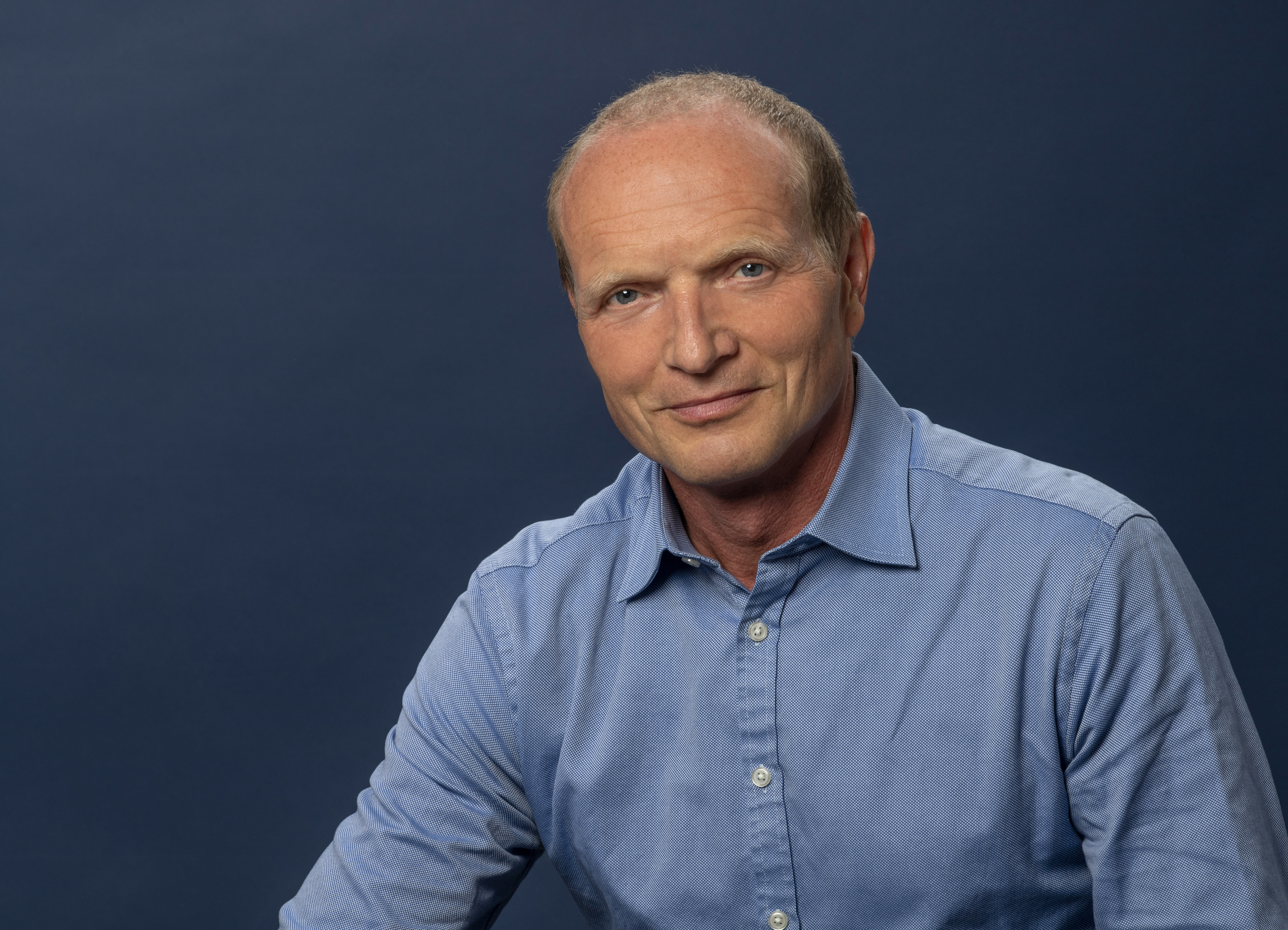
Norbert Preetz

Norbert Preetz (born 1959 in Brandenburg) is a German psychologist and hypnotherapist. He has contributed to the dissemination of Edwin Yager's Yager Code Therapy in Germany and Europe.

== Life ==
Born in Brandenburg, Germany, as the third child of two teachers, Preetz grew up in Rathenow. After finishing school, he trained as a toolmaker and worked as a vocational instructor at the Rathenow optical works. Preetz studied clinical psychology at Humboldt University in Berlin. Subsequently, he worked as a clinical psychologist at the Medical Academy Magdeburg and as a psychotherapist in private practice. In 1993, he received his doctorate from the Medical Academy Magdeburg.

In January 1999, he was licensed and registered as a medical practitioner. Today, he shares his experiences from patient therapy with young therapists and physicians and has been fully dedicated to training since 2021.

== Yager Code dissemination ==
It was in 2014 that Preetz's life was significantly impacted when he encountered Edwin Yager and his subliminal therapy. He began to incorporate this technique into his work and the successes he achieved motivated and obligated him to promote its dissemination in Germany, Europe, and worldwide. Together with Edwin Yager, he disseminated the Yager Code in Germany, and by 2026, more than 3,000 interested individuals and therapists in Germany alone had been trained in this method.

== Teacher, author, and mentor ==
Preetz is an author and teacher, and has trained more than 3000 students and therapists in recent years. With the regression therapy he applies, repressed memories can be processed and resolved. Through his work, Norbert Preetz has contributed to the further development and training of hypnotherapy in Germany, Austria, and Switzerland.

He passes on his experience in hypnotherapy to his students and graduates. With his international network, he brings renowned hypnotherapists from all over the world to Germany, such as Steve Bierman, Stephanie Conkle and Paul Aurand, with whom he organises seminars for German therapists and translates live.
