= American Hypnosis Society =

American Hypnosis Society (AHS) existed from 1965 until 2001 for the purpose of educating interested individuals and mental health professionals in the proper practice of hypnosis. The Society's stated objective was “..to advance understanding of, and research into, the beneficial use of properly practiced hypnotherapy and to dispel myths regarding its possible misuses.”

The Society was founded by New York City-based psychiatrist Michael Goldstein, M.D., Ph.D., whose practice was focused on the treatment of aberrant behavior, and the reintegration of social outcasts with their community.

Using a local training methodology, matching students with experienced instructors on a one-on-one basis the Society's hands on approach gained it quick acceptance in New York and eventually throughout the country. This, coupled with quarterly classroom based training, allowed Society members to learn hypnosis through personal interaction with subjects and knowledgeable professionals.

== Activities ==
The Society offered certification and training recognizing successful students as hypnotists after 200 hours of training and examination and as hypnotherapists after 800 hours of training and 120 hours of supervised client interaction (which time could be accounted against the 800 hours of training). Related class work from a properly accredited institution, such as a college, could be used to offset up to 500 hours of the required class material, if approved by the accreditation panel, but only actual client interaction by a previously certified hypnotherapist could be used for the 120-hour client requirement. Submission to examinations and demonstrations of accumulated knowledge were required by students at regular intervals during the education process.

At its apex, the Society had a membership consisting of over 750 hypnotherapists and mental health professionals, most on the Eastern half of the United States and Canada.

== Dissolution ==
The Society was eventually disbanded when, on behalf of the Board of Trustees, Secretary Edward J. Herman announced that the Board had discovered that the Treasurer, Patricia O’Neal had embezzled the majority of the Society's operating capital in the eighteen (18) months after Dr. Goldstein's death in 1999.

Since the dissolution of the Society, the majority of its former members have migrated to the Society For Psychological Hypnosis (division 30 of the American Psychological Association), the National Guild of Hypnotists, or to Dr. Milton Erickson's American Society of Clinical Hypnosis.
