= National Guild of Hypnotists =

International organization of hypnotists

The National Guild of Hypnotists (NGH) is a non-profit, membership-based, international organization for professional consulting hypnotists. The organization is headquartered in Merrimack, New Hampshire. As the oldest and largest hypnotism organization in the world, NGH has approximately 20,000 members across the United States and in more than 93 countries. As of 2020, the President of the National Guild of Hypnotists is Dr. Dwight F. Damon, who is also a founding member.

NGH sets professional standards for hypnotic practice and services. Guild members do not diagnose, treat, nor prescribe for clients regarding issues related to medical or mental health conditions. They work with clients only with the intent to enhance the client's own natural restorative and coping abilities, and can serve as success coaches, motivators, and guides.

== History ==
The NGH was founded in Boston, Massachusetts in 1951 by Dr. Rexford L. North. Throughout its history, it has received various honors and awards for its accomplishments and today it claims to be the preeminent professional hypnotism association in its field. NGH has been commended twice in the United States Congressional Record.

On May 11, 1993, the National Guild of Hypnotists was recognized by the 103rd Congress of the United States for its efforts toward establishing and maintaining a rigorous professional code of ethics, as well as high-quality educational resources in the advancement of professional hypnotism.

In 1994, The NGH chartered a union chapter through the Office and Professional Employees International Union (OPEIU), the National Federation of Hypnotists, Local 104, OPEIU-AFL-CIO, CLC, in order to provide additional legal and political assistance to NGH members by providing access to an official, unionized organization.

In 2000, the organization represented its members in discussions with the State of Indiana, which had set up a committee to license hypnotists.

From 2001 onwards its recruitment benefitted from the collapse of the American Hypnosis Society.

In August, 2013, Massachusetts Governor Deval Patrick awarded the National Guild of Hypnotists a Governor's Citation, in recognition of their 63rd anniversary. Mayor Arthur G. Vigeant declared August 10, 2013, to be National Guild of Hypnotists Day in the city of Marlborough, Massachusetts, in recognition of contributions made to the city, state, and country.

On December 11, 2014, U.S. Representative Steve Stockman of Texas recommended the NGH as "one of two organizations from which to seek referrals" for hypnosis.

== Activities ==
=== Certification ===
As part of ongoing services to the member community, the National Guild of Hypnotists has produced several certification, education, and training programs. In 1990, NGH set requirements of 15 hours of continuing education credits for active certification status. In 1991, the minimum number of training hours was raised to 100, with 75 class hours and 25 hours independent study. That year, a Forensic Hypnosis curriculum and the Train the Trainers Program and core curriculum were introduced. In 1992, a continuing education workshop program for NGH members was organized.

In 1995, the Registered Hypnotherapist designation was replaced with the Certified Hypnotherapist designation. In 1998, the NGH Certification Board was created, and a Pediatric Hypnotism curriculum was developed. In 1999, Medgar Evers College – City University of New York began offering a NGH Certification course, an Emergency Hypnotism curriculum and a Complementary Medical Hypnotism curriculum were added. In 2000, the NGH core curriculum was translated into Chinese, Danish, Dutch, French, Spanish and Polish. In 2003 and 2004, three new programs were added: Sports Hypnotism, and a 12-month Clinical Hypnotism curriculum, and a Hypno-Coaching program.

In 2006, NGH leadership accepted "Certified Consulting Hypnotist" as the organization's primary credential. In 2015, the NGH further amended its credentialing policies and decided that, moving forward, it would only issue the "Hypnotherapist" certification to applicants who were already licensed health practitioners. As of 2020, the NGH also offers the Certified Hypnotist and Board Certified Consulting Hypnotist (BCH) designations, as well.

The NGH also maintains an updated guide to state law and legal issues regarding hypnotism for public and member education.

=== Publications ===
Beginning in May 1951, the NGH established a magazine called Journal of Hypnotism. Founder Dr. Rexford L. North served as editor and publisher, with contributing editors and authors including current President Dwight Damon, Harry Arons, and Bernard Yanover. This publication serves as a trade journal for practicing professional hypnotists.

In 1987, NGH began a newsletter called Hypno-Gram with articles from guild members. Dr. Dwight F. Damon is the current editor of this publication.

The National Guild of Hypnotists has also acted as book publisher for some members, including NGH President Dwight Damon.

- Inside Secrets of Stage Hypnotism - Jerry Valley
- You Have Been Here Before: A Psychologist Looks at Past Lives - by Edith Fiore
- Raising Your Children with Hypnosis - Donald J. Mottin
- The Illustrated History of Hypnotism - by John C. Hughes
- Consumer Guide To Hypnotism - by Dwight F. Damon
- Hypnosis the Induction of Conviction - John C. Hughes
- The Crash Course In Selling Hypnosis - John Weir

=== Conventions ===
The first annual National Guild of Hypnotists Annual Convention was held in 1988 in Danvers, Massachusetts. The 1989 convention was held in New York City, New York.

From 1990 to 2004 the convention was held in Nashua, New Hampshire.

From 2005 to 2019, the convention has been held in Marlborough, Massachusetts.

The theme of the 26th annual convention held in 2013 was "A Legacy of Excellence". It featured both stage and consulting hypnotists, and was reported to have nearly 1,200 attendees. The 2014 Convention was held from August 8–10, with the theme of "Building Our Profession".

== Public awareness ==
The Guild also organizes presentations aimed at educating the public about the uses of hypnosis.

== See also ==
- American Hypnosis Society
