= Olivia Hooker =

American psychologist, professor, and the last known survivor of the Tulsa race massacre

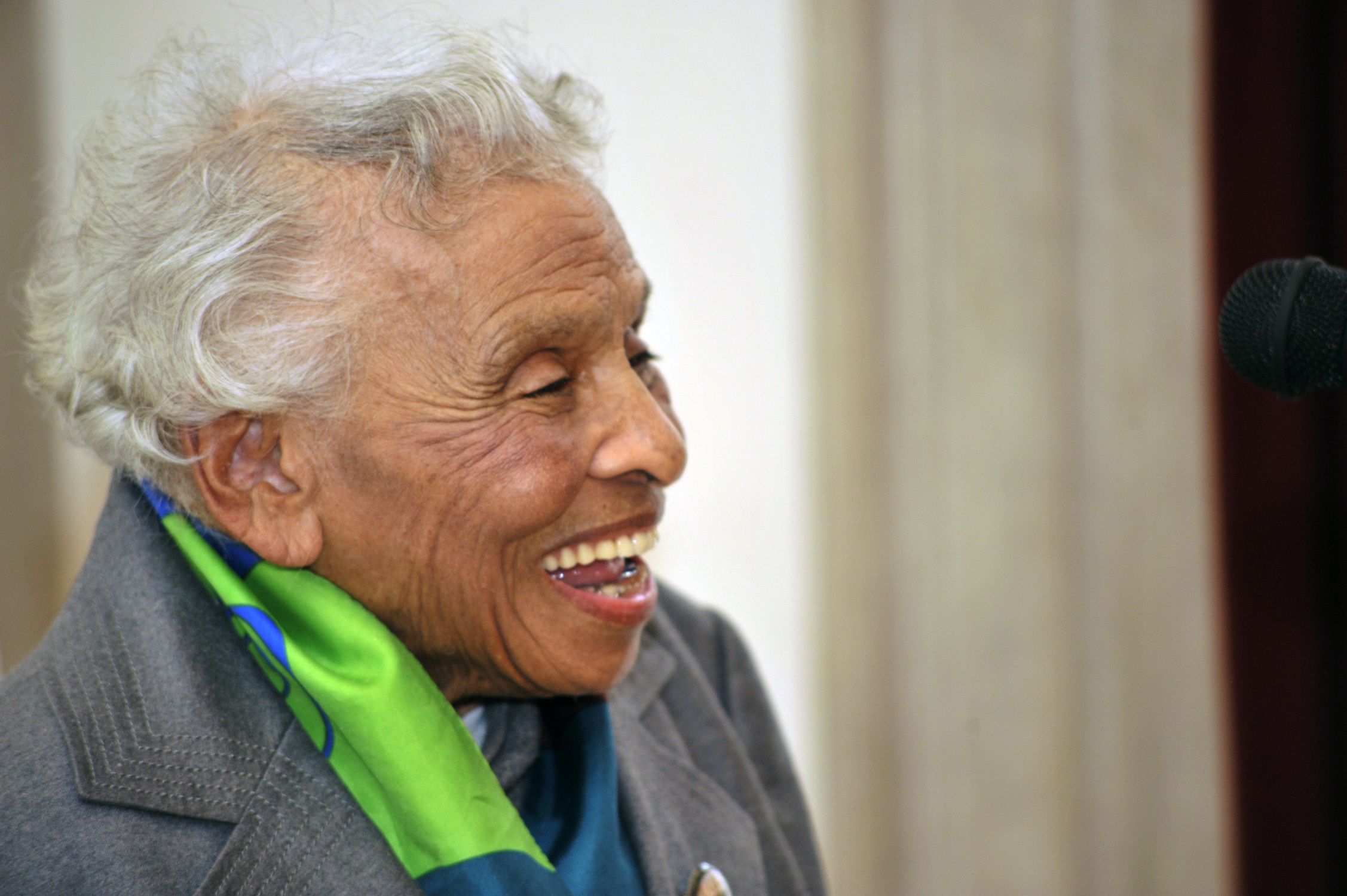
- Hooker in 2011
- Born: Olivia Juliette Hooker; February 12, 1915; Muskogee, Oklahoma, U.S.
- Died: November 21, 2018 (aged 103); White Plains, New York, U.S.
- Education: Ohio State University (BA); Teachers College, Columbia University (MA); University of Rochester (PhD)
- Military career
- Allegiance: United States
- Branch: U.S. Coast Guard
- Service years: 1945–1946
- Rank: Yeoman Third Class
- Unit: SPARS
- Conflicts: World War II
- Awards: Coast Guard Good Conduct Medal

Olivia Juliette Hooker (February 12, 1915 – November 21, 2018) was an American psychologist and professor. She was a survivor of the Tulsa race massacre of 1921, and the first African-American woman to enter the U.S. Coast Guard. During World War II, she became a member of the United States Coast Guard Women's Reserve, earning the rank of Yeoman Third Class during her service. She served in the Coast Guard until her unit was disbanded in mid-1946. Hooker then used her G.I. Bill to obtain her master's degree in psychological services and went on earn her PhD in clinical psychology. In 1973, she helped form the American Psychological Association's Division 33: IDD/ASD, which is dedicated to "advancing psychological research, professional education, and clinical services that increase quality of life in individuals with IDD/ASD across the life course."

== Early life and education ==
One of five children, Hooker was born in Muskogee, Oklahoma, to Samuel Hooker and Anita Hooker (née Stigger). The family was living in the Greenwood District of Tulsa on May 31, 1921, when a group of white men carrying torches entered their home and began destroying their belongings, including her sister's piano and her father's record player. She and her siblings crouched under a table, hidden by a tablecloth, until the men were gone. "It was a horrifying thing for a little girl who's only six years old," she told Radio Diaries in 2018, "trying to remember to keep quiet, so they wouldn't know we were there." The attack was part of the Tulsa race massacre of May 31 – June 1, 1921, in which members of the Ku Klux Klan and other white residents of Tulsa destroyed the Greenwood District—also known as Black Wall Street for the concentration of Black-owned businesses in the area—killing as many as 300 people and leaving more than 10,000 homeless.

After the riots, her family moved to Topeka, Kansas, and then to Columbus, Ohio.

She earned her bachelor of arts in 1937 from The Ohio State University. While at OSU, she joined the Delta Sigma Theta sorority, where she advocated for African-American women to be admitted to the U.S. Navy.

In 1947, she used her GI Bill to obtain her master's in psychological services from the Teachers College of Columbia University.

In 1961 she received her PhD in clinical psychology from the University of Rochester, with her dissertation focusing on the learning abilities of children with Down syndrome.

== Career ==
=== Elementary school teacher ===
Hooker worked as an elementary school teacher until joining the U.S. Coast Guard during World War II. During this time she understood the need for proper evaluations for special needs as she saw too many students referred simply because "they didn't sit still." She was deeply concerned with mischaracterization.

=== U.S. Coast Guard ===
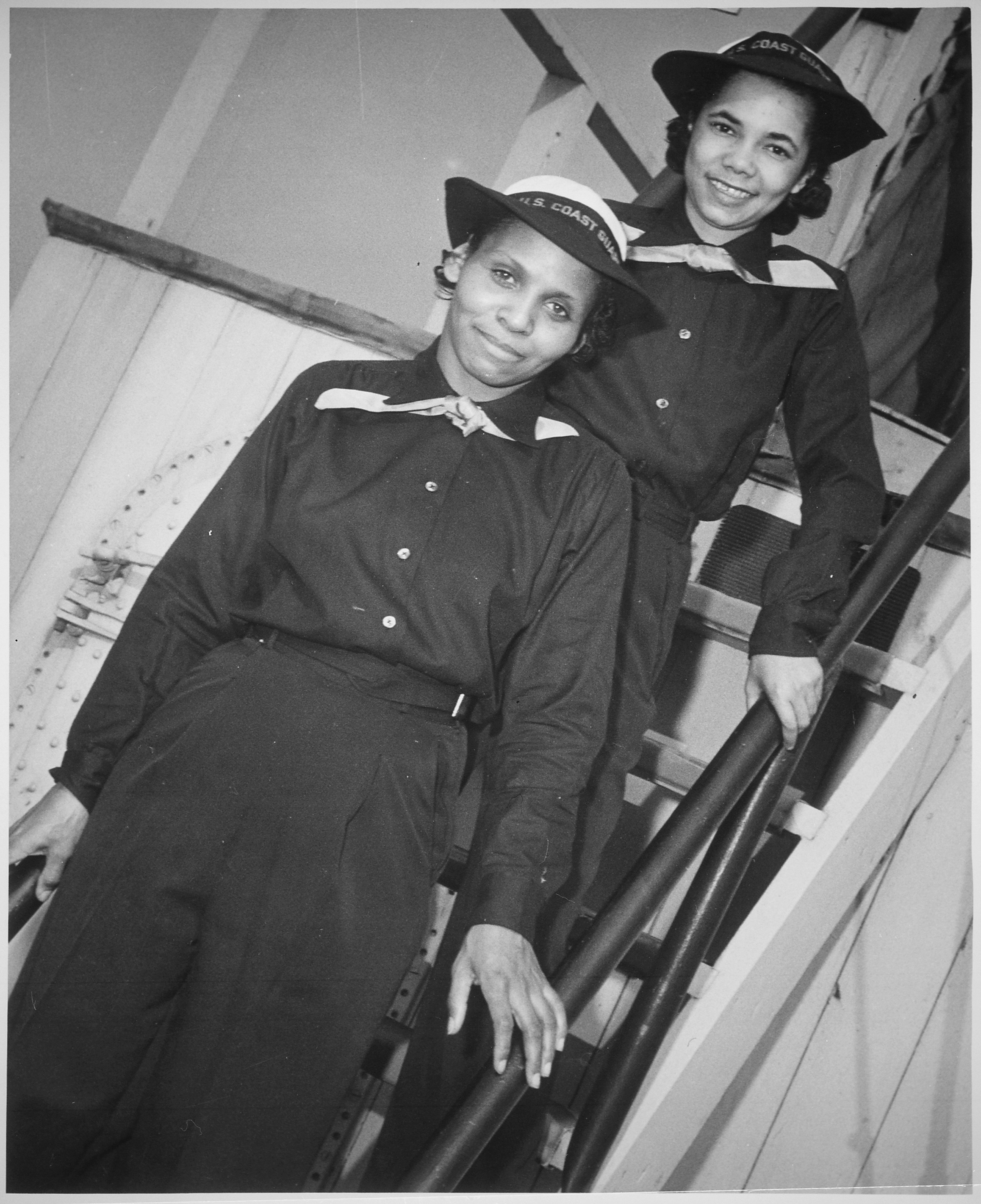
Olivia Hooker (front) with Aileen Anita Cooks (behind) on the USS Commodore (nicknamed USS Neversail) during basic training, Manhattan Beach, Brooklyn

Hooker applied to the Women Accepted for Volunteer Emergency Service (WAVES) of the U.S. Navy, but was rejected because she was African-American. She disputed the rejection due to a technicality and was accepted; however, she had already decided to join the Coast Guard. She entered the U.S. Coast Guard in February 1945. On March 9, 1945, she was sent to basic training for six weeks in Manhattan Beach, Brooklyn, New York. Throughout training, Hooker became a Coast Guard Women's Reserve (SPARS) and had to attend classes and pass exams. She was one of only five African-American females to first enlist in the SPARS program. After basic training, Hooker specialized in the yeoman rate and remained at boot camp for an additional nine weeks before heading to The Separation Center in Boston where she performed administrative duties and earned the rank of Yeoman Third Class in the Coast Guard Women's Reserve. In June 1946, the SPAR program was disbanded and Hooker earned the rank of petty officer 3rd class and a Good Conduct Award.

=== Psychology ===
After earning her master's degree from Teachers College of Columbia University, Hooker moved upstate to work in the mental hygiene department of a women's correctional facility in Albion County. Many women in this facility were considered to have severe learning disabilities by staff. Hooker felt they were treated unfairly and re-evaluated them in hopes to help the women pursue better education and jobs after their time in the facility. She credited this success with "approaching them with an open mind." The correctional facility today continues to help women earn a degree and job experience for when they are released.

Hooker worked as a clinical psychologist at Albion State School from 1948 to 1951 and then Westfield Farm from 1951 to 1954. She worked at Rochester State Hospital first as a graduate trainee (1955–57) then as a clinical psychologist(1957–58). While working as a senior research scientist at Letchworth Village, she completed her dissertation titled, "Formboard Performance in Mongoloid, Undifferentiated, and Brain-injured children." Hooker focused on motivational learning in children with developmental disabilities, especially those with Down syndrome.

Her dissertation was completed under the supervision of Emory L. Cowen.

Hooker’s decades long research was focused on clinical child psychology and developmental disabilities.

In 1963, she joined Fordham University as a senior clinical lecturer and an APA Honors psychology professor; eventually she served as an associate professor until 1985 when she earned the title, professor emerita.

She worked as a psychologist at Fred S. Keller School for Behavioral Analysis from 1992 to 2002.

Hooker was one of the founders of the American Psychological Association's (APA) Division 33, Intellectual and Developmental Disabilities and was later honored by the Association for her work with children.

She served as an early director of the Kennedy Child Study Center in New York City where she gave evaluations, extra help, and support/therapy to children with learning disabilities and developmental delays. During this time she worked alongside Kenneth Bancroft Clark and contributed to some of his work.

== Later life and legacy ==
She was an associate member of Sigma Xi.

Hooker was an active member of the White Plains/Greenburgh NAACP.

In 1997, Hooker and other survivors of the massacre founded the Tulsa Race Riot Commission, to investigate the massacre, its aftermath, and seek reparations.

In February 1999, Hooker was bestowed the award of Honorary Chief Petty Officer in the U.S. Coast Guard. The award was presented by the Eighth Master Chief Petty Officer of the Coast Guard, Vince Patton.

In 2000, Hooker met Zeita Merchant, a black woman who in 2021 became the first person of an ethnic minority to hold the role of Commanding Officer of the U.S. Coast Guard Sector New York. Up until Hooker's death, she was a mentor to Merchant.

Hooker retired in 2002, at the age of 87.

In 2003, she was one of the plaintiffs in a federal lawsuit filed against the state of Oklahoma and the city of Tulsa by more than 100 survivors and about 300 descendants of people who lost their lives or property in the attacks, seeking compensation due to the local governments' involvement in the massacre. The US Supreme Court dismissed the case without comment in 2005.

She joined the Coast Guard Auxiliary at age 95 and served as an auxiliarist in Yonkers, New York.

In 2008, she starred as herself in the documentary Before They Die! and was said to be involved in many aspects of its inception.

Hooker received the American Psychological Association Presidential Citation in 2011.

In 2012, she was inducted into the New York State Senate Veterans' Hall of Fame.

On February 9, 2015, Kirsten Gillibrand spoke in Congress to "pay tribute" to Hooker. In the same year, the Olivia Hooker Dining Facility on the Staten Island coast guard facility was named in her honor. A training facility at the Coast Guard's headquarters in Washington, D.C. was also named after her that same year.

On May 20, 2015, President Barack Obama recognized Hooker's Coast Guard service and legacy while in attendance at the 134th Commencement of the United States Coast Guard Academy.

On September 18, 2016, at the age of 101, Dr. Hooker, alongside Jonathan Galente received the first ever Manhattan Psychological Association (MPA) Anne Anastasi Award for being a "pioneering psychology teacher, researcher and practitioner".

On November 11, 2018, Google honored her by telling her story as part of a Google Doodle for the Veterans Day holiday.

Hooker died of natural causes in her home in White Plains, New York on November 21, 2018, at the age of 103.

Tulsa Girl, by Shameen Anthanio-Williams, is a children's book focused on Hooker's experiences in the Tulsa race massacre.

In October 2019, it was announced that the sixty-first Coast Guard fast response cutter would be named in her honor. The USCGC Olivia Hooker was commissioned at her homeport of Pascagoula, Mississippi on January 22, 2026.
