= Rebecca Pillai Riddell =

Canadian clinical psychologist and behavioral scientist

- Born: Rebecca Rita Elizabeth Pillai
- Citizenship: Canada
- Spouse: Steffan Riddell
- Children: 2

Academic background
- Education: B.A., 1996, York University; M.A., 2000; PhD 2004, University of British Columbia
- Thesis: Attributions of pain to infants: a comparative analysis of parents, nurses and paediatricians. (2004)

Academic work
- Institutions: York University

Rebecca Rita Elizabeth Riddell (née Pillai) is a Canadian clinical psychologist and a basic-behavioural scientist. She is a full professor at York University and Tier 2 York Research Chair in Pain and Mental Health.

She was also appointed Associate Vice-President of Research at York University in 2017. Two years later, she was elected a member of the College of New Scholars of the Royal Society of Canada.

== Career ==
After earning her PhD, Pillai Riddell became the director of the Opportunities to Understand Childhood Hurt (OUCH) Laboratory at York University. OUCH Lab at York University was launched in 2004 to understand how caregivers and children interact within the context of pain.

In 2014, Pillai Riddell was named the Co-Principal Investigator for the Pain in Child Health initiative. On January 14, 2015, she was named the inaugural Tier 2 York Research Chair in Pain and Mental Health. By May 2016, the OUCH Laboratory published a study concluding that there was a strong connection between preschool aged children experiencing anxiety prior to vaccinations and their parents’ behaviour during vaccinations in infancy.

Pillai Riddell was also the recipient of the President's Emerging Research Leadership Award from York University. Due to her voluminous research on the topic of pain, she was appointed Associate Vice-President of Research at York University in November 2017.

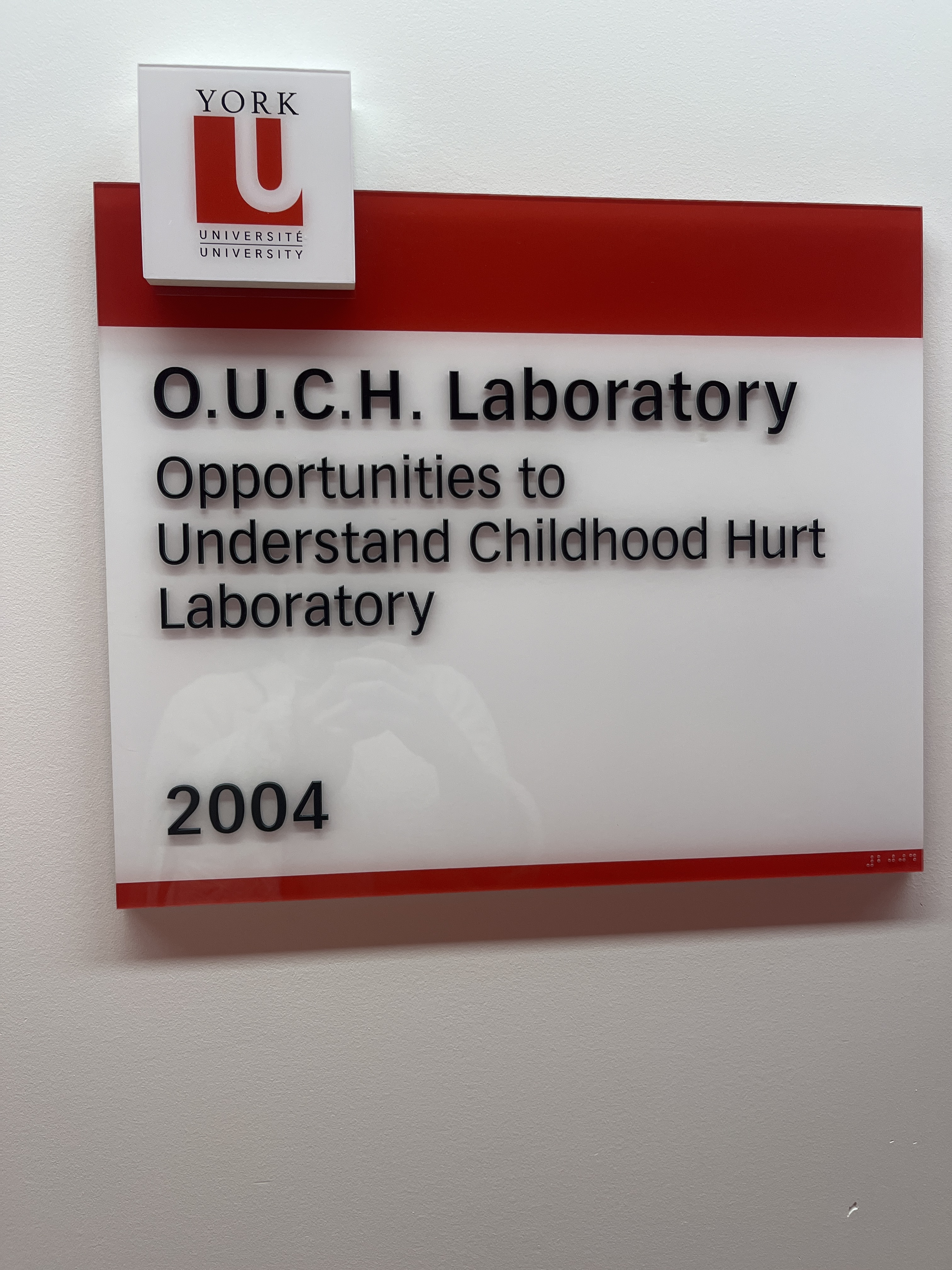
sign outside of OUCH laboratory.

In March 2018, she was honoured by the Faculty of Graduate Studies with the Faculty's Teaching Award for her achievements in graduate teaching and supervisory excellence.

On May 5, 2019, Pillai Riddell and fellow researchers with OUCH Laboratory were awarded a $1.5-million grant from the Canadian Institutes of Health Research, the Social Sciences and Humanities Research Council and the Natural Sciences and Engineering Research Council.

That same month, she was the recipient of the 2019 Jeffrey Lawson Award for Advocacy in Children's Pain Relief and announced plans to create a Research Commons for research grants. In September 2019, she elected a member of the College of New Scholars of the Royal Society of Canada.

During the COVID-19 pandemic, Pillai Riddell worked to reduce post-vaccination stress in young children.

In September 2021, she was elected a Fellow of the Canadian Academy of Health Sciences.

== Personal life ==
Rebecca Pillai Riddell and her husband, Steffan Riddell, have two daughters together.
