= Jeffrey K. Zeig =

American psychologist

Jeffrey K. Zeig (born 6 November 1947), is a writer, teacher and practitioner of psychotherapy. He has edited, co-edited, authored or coauthored more than 20 books on psychotherapy that appear in fourteen languages. He organises several conferences on psychotherapy, and is the founder and director of the Milton H. Erickson Foundation.

== Background ==
Zeig is the architect of The Evolution of Psychotherapy Conferences, which attract leading psychotherapists. He organizes the Brief Therapy Conferences, the Couples Conferences, and the International Congresses on Ericksonian Approaches to Hypnosis and Psychotherapy. Zeig is on the Editorial Board of numerous journals; is a Fellow of the American Psychological Association (Division 29, Psychotherapy); and Fellow of the American Society of Clinical Hypnosis. He is a Distinguished Practitioner in the National Academy of Practice in Psychology of the National Academies of Practice.

Zeig has served as a Clinical Member of the International Transactional Analysis Association (1974–1985), and an Adjunct Assistant Professor of Clinical Psychology at Arizona State University (1988–1992).

A psychologist and marriage and family therapist in private practice in Phoenix, Arizona, Zeig conducts workshops internationally (40 countries). Zeig speaks at major universities and teaching hospitals including The Mayo Clinic, Menningers and MD Anderson. He is president of Zeig, Tucker & Theisen, Inc., publishers in the behavioral sciences.
