= Elizabeth Jeglic =

American clinical psychologist

Elizabeth L. Jeglic
- Occupations: Clinical Psychologist and a Professor of Psychology at John Jay College

Academic background
- Education: Postdoctoral Fellowship, University of Pennsylvania (2004) Ph.D., Clinical Psychology Binghamton University (2003) M.A., Clinical Psychology Binghamton University (2001) B.A Psychology Honors, University of Ottawa (1998) BSc. Biochemistry University of Ottawa (1996)
- Alma mater: University of Pennsylvania
- Doctoral advisor: Dr. Pepper

Academic work
- Discipline: Clinical Psychology
- Sub-discipline: Sexual Violence Prevention, Sexual Grooming, Child Sexual Abuse and Sexual Assault

Elizabeth Lillian Jeglic is a licensed clinical psychologist and professor of psychology at John Jay College of Criminal Justice and the CUNY Graduate Center. She is an internationally renowned expert in sexual violence prevention, sexual grooming, child sexual abuse and sexual assault.

== Education and academic career ==
Jeglic received her B.Sc. degree in Biochemistry from the University of Ottawa in 1996 and her B.A. degree in Psychology with Honors in 1998 from the same university. She attended graduate school at Binghamton University where she obtained her Masters of Arts (2001) and Ph.D. in clinical psychology (2003) under the supervision of Carolyn M. Pepper and wrote her dissertation entitled An Analysis of Suicidal Behavior in College. Jeglic completed her postdoctoral fellowship at the University of Pennsylvania under the mentorship of Aaron Beck.

During her postdoctoral fellowship at Penn, Jeglic was appointed as an assistant professor at John Jay College of Criminal Justice. After completing her fellowship, she continued her academic career at John Jay College, where she was promoted to associate professor in 2008 and full professor in 2013.

In January 2020, Jeglic began working as an expert witness and consultant for civil, criminal, and military court-martial cases, specializing in matters involving child sexual abuse, sexual grooming, sexual assault, historical abuse cases, and institutional responsibility in sexual violence prevention. She also provides presentations, keynote addresses, organizational consulting regarding sexual violence prevention policies and training to schools and colleges, government entities, community and parenting groups, criminal justice organizations, the military, and public and private sector companies. Jeglic presented her research findings identifying specific pre-offense behaviors linked to sexual grooming at the 23rd Annual Safe at Home Conference: Empowering Professionals, Championing Survivors, and Advancing Prevention Tactics in Family Violence October 10, 2023. Her presentation explored the implications of these findings for the education, prevention, and investigation of child sexual abuse. She also recently presented at the 36th Annual Crimes Against Children Conference on August 12–13, 2024. Her presentations, Expert Testimony in Cases of Child Sexual Abuse and Identification of Red Flag Sexual Grooming Behaviors: Implications for Practice, were offered live and are also available on demand. She has also featured as a guest expert on the One in Ten podcast episode titled The Real Red Flags of Grooming. In this episode, she discussed her research from John Jay, which identifies red flag behaviors that mandatory reporters, parents, and professionals can recognize to help prevent abuse.

=== Honors and awards ===
Jeglic has received numerous awards and accolades throughout her career, recognizing her scholarly achievements, mentorship, and contributions to sexual violence prevention. Notable honors include the Faculty Excellence Award from John Jay College in 2007 and 2016, the Fay Honey Knopp Award from the New York State Association for the Treatment of Sexual Abusers in 2014, and multiple mentorship awards from John Jay College in 2009, 2013, and 2015. Additionally, she was awarded a doctoral fellowship from the Social Sciences and Humanities Research Council of Canada (2001-2003) and participated in the Summer Research Institute for Suicide Prevention with the National Institute of Mental Health in 2005.

=== Teaching ===
Jeglic has taught a wide range of psychology courses at both the undergraduate and graduate levels at John Jay College. Her undergraduate courses cover introductory psychology, abnormal psychology, and clinical topics, while her graduate-level courses focus on counseling and rehabilitation of offenders, psychopathology, and psychotherapy. At the 2023 Safe at Home Conference, she taught a workshop titled Does Adult Sexual Abuse Also Involve Grooming?, where she presented her research on the prevalence of sexual grooming behaviors in cases of adult sexual abuse to inform sexual violence prevention, detection, and intervention efforts. Some of her lectures such as The Treatment of Sexual Offenders, Lecture 1 Diagnosis and Classification Updated to DSM 5 TR, and Lecture 2 Therapeutic Alliance and Structure of Therapy, are available on her YouTube channel @ejeglic

== Research ==
=== Research grants ===
Jeglic has secured numerous research grants throughout her career, supporting her work on sexual offender management, recidivism, and suicide prevention. She has served as principal investigator on several PSC-CUNY research grants, including studies on Social Support and Case Management Model of Released Sexual Offenders (2015), Barriers to Reentry: Sex Offenders Speak about the Impact of Sex Offender Laws (2013), and the Predictive Validity of the Emotional Stroop Test (2011). She was awarded a National Institute of Justice grant in 2007 for nearly $300,000 to analyze sex offender management and treatment aimed at reducing sexual violence. Additionally, she has co-led collaborative research grants, such as a City University of New York Collaborative Grant on The economics of sex crime policy and the reduction of sexual recidivism (2012) and studies on sex offender recidivism funded by the Forensic Psychology Research Institute. Jeglic's research has also explored suicide prevention, including a pilot study on suicidal behavior among Latino college students, funded by the American Foundation for Suicide Prevention (2007). Along with Cynthia Calkins, Jeglic is co-director of the Sex Offender Research Lab.

Jeglic's work has been cited in The New York Times, The Associated Press, and Time Magazine, and others. In addition to her academic contributions, she regularly writes for Psychology Today, where she blogs on topics related to sexual violence prevention. This extensive engagement with the public and professional communities underscores the impact of her research, which is reflected in her portfolio of over 140 peer-reviewed articles and book chapters.

=== Books ===
Jeglic has co-authored several books focusing on child sexual abuse prevention and grooming. In Sexual Grooming: Integrating Research, Practice, Prevention, and Policy (2022), co-authored with Georgia Winters, she provides a comprehensive overview of sexual grooming, examining the manipulative process offenders use to facilitate abuse while avoiding detection, and reviews key models, historical context, and the broader impact on victims, families, and communities. She also co-authored Protecting Your Child from Sexual Abuse: What You Need to Know to Keep Your Kids Safe (2018, 2nd ed. 2020) with Cynthia Calkins.

==== Editorial work ====
Jeglic is on the board of Sexual Abuse, the official journal of the Association For The Treatment & Prevention Of Sexual Abuse. She is also the co-editor of four books: Handbook of Youth Suicide Prevention (Springer, 2022), Handbook of Issues of Criminal Justice Reform in the U.S. (Springer, 2021), New Frontiers in Offender Treatment: The Translation of Evidence Based Practices to Correctional Settings (Springer, 2018), Evidence Based Sex Offender Legislation: Policy and Prevention (Springer, 2016). The latter provides an edited volume that explores the gap between legislation, research, and practice in sexual violence prevention. It highlights that current policies, such as residence restrictions and registration statutes, mainly target repeat offenders, despite evidence showing that these measures may destabilize offenders, limit their reintegration into society, and increase recidivism, while the majority of sex crimes (95%) are committed by first-time offenders.
