= Kim Bergman =

American psychologist and surrogacy advocate

- Occupations: Clinical psychologist Surrogacy advocate
- Years active: 1994 to present
- Known for: Co-owner of Growing Generations
- Awards: Hostetter-Habib Family Award from the Family Equality Council

Kim Bergman is an American psychologist, author, and surrogacy advocate. Her book Your Future Family: The Essential Guide to Assisted Reproduction was published in 2019.

== Career ==
Bergman began working in the surrogacy field in 1994. Prior to this she was a clinical psychologist. In 1996, she closed her practice and began work as a psychologist for Growing Generations, where she is now a co-owner. At Growing Generations, Bergman has been involved in more than 1700 surrogacies, and has worked as an advocate for LGBTQ rights and civil rights legislation. She has also discussed surrogacy issues in the media.

== Works ==
Kim Bergman's research has been published in journals including Psychology of Sexual Orientation and Gender Diversity and the Journal of GLBT Family Studies. Her book Your Future Family: The Essential Guide to Assisted Reproduction was published in 2019. The book focuses on assisted reproduction issues and provides advice to prospective parents.

== Honors and awards ==
- 2019 Hostetter-Habib Family Award by the Family Equality Council.

== Personal life ==
Bergman and her wife Natalie have two daughters.
