= C. Michael Smith =

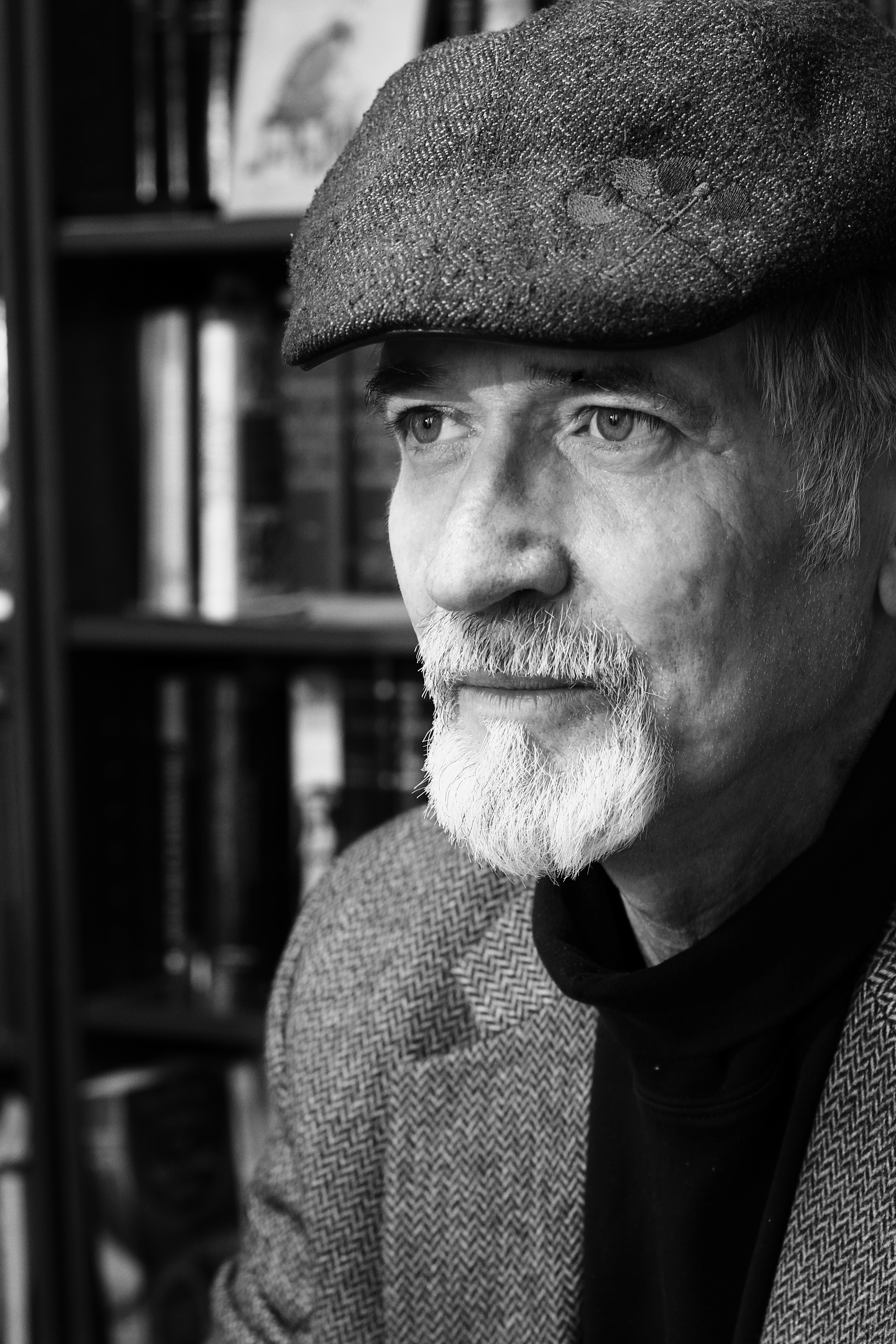
- Born: August 29, 1950; Indianapolis, Indiana
- Other name: Mikkal

C. Michael Smith (born August 29, 1950, in Indianapolis, Indiana) is a clinical psychologist and scholar whose medical anthropological and theoretical work has focused on the study of healing systems across cultures. He holds that study of indigenous healing systems can help clarify the strengths and weaknesses of our own modern health care systems.

== Biography ==
C. Michael Smith attended the University of Chicago where he studied with the French philosopher Paul Ricoeur and the cultural psychologist Sudhir Kakar. He took two doctorates from the [Chicago Theological Seminary] in a joint program with the [University of Chicago], under Robert L. Moore. He holds a certificate in Analytical Psychology from the CG Jung Institute of Chicago.

He is director and founder of Crows Nest Center for Shamanic Studies USA, France and Belgium, and has taught at Center Trimurti in Paris and Cogolin, France 2009–2023, and has taught at Institut Resources (PNL) in Bruxelles, Belgium. He taught in the third year analyst training program at the C.G. Jung Institute, Bangalor, India, for the Moscow Society of Jungian Analysts and the Russian Academy of Science (2021), for Instituto Mediterraneo Di Psychologia (Sicily) and lectured for the Italian Institute for Analytical Psychology (CIPA), 2022. His special area of focus has been in bridging indigenous medical systems with depth psychology.In 2018 he gave the Keynote Lectures in Clinical and Humanistc Psychology at Saybrook University. He is author of Jung and Shamanism in Dialogue and Psychotherapy and the Sacred, for which he won acclaim (NAAP Gradiva Nominee Award) in 1996.

== Teachings ==
Smith's work has been an interdisciplinary enterprise in applying the phenomenological-hermeneutic and dialogic method of inquiry, learned while a student of the French philosopher Paul Ricoeur at the University of Chicago. This methodology was then combined with medical-anthropological methods of analysis and interpretation of healing systems across cultures, derived from his studies with Sudhir Kakar, also at Chicago.

Finally he combined all this with the scheme of "ritual process and leadership in establishing and maintaining the boundaries of transformative sacred space" created by his doctoral chair, the Jungian analyst and theorist Robert L. Moore, of the Chicago Theological Seminary. Smith credits these three figures with giving his own scholarly and practical work, its orientation and thrust.

=== Medical Anthropology ===
Smith has defined medical-anthropology thus: Medical anthropology is a multi-disciplinary field examining the relationship between culture and health care systems, and the way disease is engendered, shaped, managed, diagnosed, and treated within a given society.

From his first publication in 1981, "Theology and the Human Story" [Encounter: Creative Theological Scholarship, Winter 1981, Vol. 42, No.1] Smith has shown increasing interest in the applications of sacred story and myth to the problems of human suffering. In his medical anthropological writing he has extended this interest into identifying all manner of sacred resources within a cultural or religion bond context (myth, symbol, ritual, rites of passage, sacred texts, theological doctrines, sacred architecture, use of mandalas, geometrix, charms, amulets, etc.).

Smith has been especially interested in the clinical applications of his study of health care systems across cultures. He advocates that the study of other cultural health care systems can illuminate the strengths and weaknesses of our own.

=== Framework for the Sacred ===
Smith contends that there is an unacknowledged public grieving over the loss of the role of the sacred in modern western psychological and psychiatric practices, claiming that modern people are disappointed when their problems and suffering are not placed in a context of ultimate meaning [Psych & Sacred 21]. In Psychotherapy and the Sacred, he criticized American psychotherapy professions for lack of understanding and skill in working with the spiritual and religious needs of the patient [Psych & Sacred 3–14].

Smith also criticized the field of transpersonal psychology for an over-emphasis on Eastern mysticisms and practices [Psych & Sacred 12-13], claiming that more attention needed to be given to western religious traditions, to the indigenous American and shamanic peoples of the circumpolar regions, and of the Americas, North, Central, and South. While acknowledging the great value of Eastern resources, Smith has been more consistently interested in Western and indigenous forms of healing, and he claims they have much spiritual healing wisdom that can address some of the maladies and problems in living that are widespread in modern culture.

=== Axis Mundi ===
Much of Smith's focus developed into the role of the sacred, and particularly the sacred center, or axis mundi (Mircea Eliade). He claims it is found, phenomenologically and experientially, within the psyche, and within the cultural, mythic, and religious institutions. Smith contends that we need a psychological model that has included within it the spiritual center of the client, an interior axis mundi.

If the sacred is built solidly into our psychological theories, it may then enter legitimately into our therapeutic and clinical practices. In Psychotherapy and the Sacred, Smith describes how this sacred center is addressed in various traditional cultures: India (Sufi, Islamic Unani healing system tradition), Africa (Yoruban healing system), 18th Century German pastoral care system, and a rare modern American example of a Pastoral Psychotherapy of a Psychosis. Smith draws on his Jungian theory and the process philosophy inspired by A.N. Whitehead, to develop a theory of the sacred as integral to the psyche and its health. He focuses particularly on Jung's concept of the archetypal Self, and its Spiritus Rector function as the most likely model of how the sacred can be present and effective in the psyche, and support clinical healing efforts. The spiritus rector is the central interior wisdom directing the psyche as a whole in its quest for wholeness and health. It is a precursor that influenced Stanislav Grof's concept of the holotropic (from holo-trepein = moving towards wholeness).

=== Jung and Shamanism: Building Bridges ===
Smith emphasizes the interior axis mundi as this spiritus rector function at work in the psyche in his subsequent work. In his most well-known book, Jung and Shamanism in Dialogue [Paulist Press, 1997] he used the dialogic method (Ricoeur) to build a theoretical bridge between shamanism and the Jungian psychological model. Smith takes Jung's life and work and creates a dialogue between classic shamanism as a proposed dialogic partner. Each of Jung's major concepts as well as his psychological and therapeutic methods are rigorously compared and contrasted. The scope of the project ranges across the therapeutic use of non ordinary states of consciousness [NOSCs] associated with shamanism and Jung's psychology (dreams, active imagination, visions, and psychoses with spiritual content) and across evolutionary, neurobiological, and cultural phenomena, such as the therapeutic use of myth, chant, amulet, ritual space and containment, correlations of soul loss and contemporary dissociation theory. In the course of the book Smith advocates the need to develop a contemporary shamanic-psychotherapeutic type model for our time and place, so that we have a solid model for the active use of sacred resources in therapeutically addressing human problems in living. This book is used as a text at academic institutions rooted in depth psychology.

In this work he showed the application of this bridge-model to treatment of a variety of life-crises and trauma disorders, including post traumatic stress disorder (PTSD) and dissociative identity disorder (DID). In the 2nd edition [Trafford, 2007], Smith links his process model interpretation of the archetypal Self and spiritus rector conceptions theoretically to the concept of the heart in shamanistic and indigenous American healing systems.

== Bibliography ==
- Jung and Shamanism in Dialogue. 2nd Edition with revisions and new preface, Trafford Publishing, ISBN 1-4251-1543-8 (1997) http://crowsnestshamanism.com/blog/jung-and-shamanism-in-dialogue/jung-and-shamanism-in-dialogue/
- Jung and Shamanism in Dialogue: Retrieving Soul / Retrieving the Sacred.. Mahwah, N.J. The Paulist Press (1997) https://www.amazon.com/gp/product/customer-reviews/0809136678/ref=cm_cr_dp_pt/102-6955935-2956135?ie=UTF8&n=283155&s=books
- Psychotherapy and the Sacred: Religious Experience and Religious Resources in Psychotherapy Chicago: Center for the Scientific Study of Religion Press. ISBN 0-913348-28-7 (1995) https://web.archive.org/web/20080820004549/http://www.ctschicago.edu/content/ctspub/exp-detailid12.php
- Indigenous Views of Heart Health and Disease: A Medical-Anthropological Study with Kye Nelson in Psychological Factors in Cardiovascular Disorders: The Role of Stress and Psychosocial Influences (2009) Edited by Leo Sher, M.D.
- Seeking a Path with Heart: Finding Your Direction through Earth, Self, and Spirit in Charting Your Course: A Life-Long Guide to Heath and Compassion University of Notre Dame Press, 1998. pp 221–232. Edited by Sally Coleman, and David S. Anderson
- The Shamanic Applications Review (8 vols) (1997–2004) Edited with Dennis Waite, Ed.D.
- The Pastoral Psychotherapy of Psychosis: The Active Use of Religious Resources in a Parish Context in Creative Ministries in Contemporary Christianity Chicago: Exploration Press (1991) Edited by Perry Lefevre, Ph.D. and W. Widick Schroeder, Ph.D. https://web.archive.org/web/20080820004222/http://www.ctschicago.edu/content/ctspub/exp-detailid14.php
- Threads, Knotts, Tapestries, a Review Article (2003) http://www.threadsknotstapestries.com/pr_20040301.pdf
- Theology and the Human Story Encounter: Creative Theological Scholarship, Winter 1981, Vol. 42, No.1

== Notes ==
- Review of Jung and Shamanism in Dialogue (peer review)
- A book drawing on C. Michael Smith's research in Jungian psychology and shamanism: "Becoming: An Introduction to Jung’s Concept of individuation" by Deldon Anne McKneely, 2010. Fisher King Press.
- C. Michael Smith's work discussed in the Science of Shamanism, Pierre F Walter, 2010.
- Source in the Spiritual Emergency Resource Bibliography
- Grand Rapids Press Interview
- Grand Valley State University Lanthorn Article
