= Compeer =

Non-profit mental health organisation

- Formation: 1973
- Founder: Bernice W. Skirboll
- Founded at: Rochester, New York
- Type: Incorporated
- Legal status: Non-profit
- Purpose: Support for individuals affected by mental illness
- Methods: Adult men and women volunteer to regularly spend time with an adult or youth who is receiving mental health services.
- Members: 5000
- Website: compeer.org

Compeer, Inc. is an international, non-profit organization centered around support for mental illness. The first Compeer program was established in Rochester, New York in 1973 by Bernice W. Skirboll.

== Volunteer-based model ==
The Compeer model matches a volunteer from the community with an individual with mental illness from the same community. The volunteers are provided training and resources related to mental health care throughout the program. Adult volunteers then go on to spend time regularly with an adult or youth who is receiving mental health services. The organization's goal is to provide supportive friendships for people in mental health care, typically in complement to other therapies, in order to support them towards recovery from mental illness.

The National Institute of Mental Health chose Compeer as a model program in 1982 and helped fund the development of similar programs throughout the United States. Today, Compeer is an international mental health organization with approximately 5,000 volunteers at nearly 100 locations in the U.S., Canada, and Australia. The volunteer program has more than 80 chapters that serve about 65,000 adults and children around the world.
