= Cindy Meston =

Canadian-American clinical psychologist

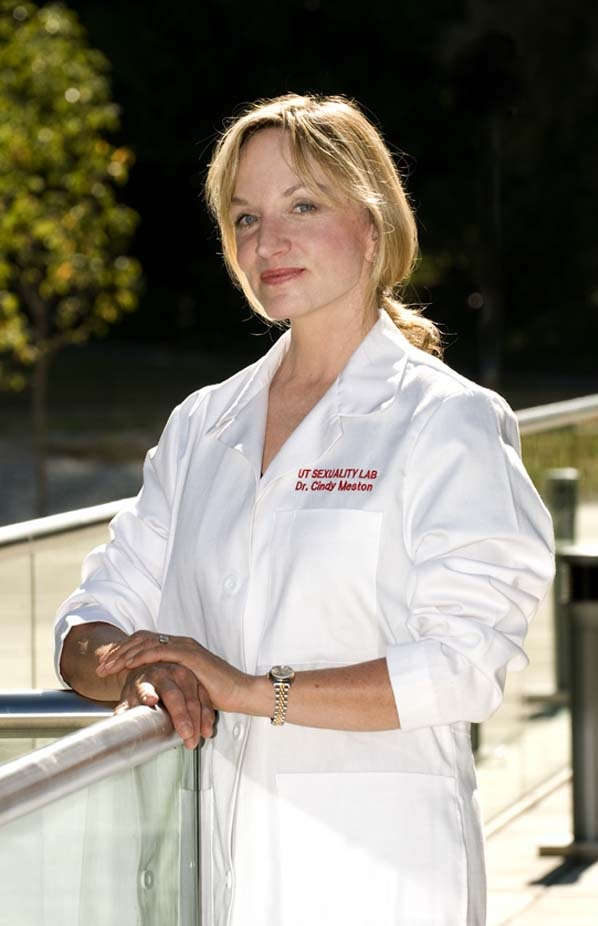

Cindy Meston is a Canadian-American clinical psychologist well-known for her research on the psychophysiology of female sexual arousal. She is a Full Professor of Clinical Psychology at the University of Texas at Austin, Director of the Female Sexual Psychophysiology Laboratory, and author of Why Women Have Sex (with co-author Dr. David M. Buss). In 2016, the BBC, London, England named Meston one of the 100 most influential and inspirational women in the world.

== Early life ==
Meston was born in Abbotsford, British Columbia, Canada. Prior to becoming a noted sex researcher, Meston lived in Vancouver, B.C. where she worked in fashion design and then as the Western Canadian Sewing Specialist for White/Elna Sewing Machine Company.

== Education and career ==
Meston received a Ph.D. in Clinical Psychology from the University of British Columbia in 1995. She completed most of her postgraduate training at the University of Washington Medical Center in the departments of Sexual and Reproductive Medicine, Psychiatry, and Urology. From 1996-1998 she received a Fellowship from the Ford Foundation in New York to study the effects of early childhood sexual abuse on adult sexual function. In 1998, she accepted a position as Assistant Professor at the University of Texas at Austin and was promoted to Full Professor of Clinical Psychology in 2007.

Meston has published over 200 peer-reviewed articles and book chapters and given over 300 conference presentations on women’s sexuality. Her book, Why Women Have Sex (co-authored with Dr. David Buss) has been translated into nine languages and has received extensive media coverage. Articles on her research and book have appeared in over 300 newspapers (e.g., Science Times, New York Times), magazines (e.g., NewYorker, Cosmopolitan, Harper’s Bazaar, Elle, Glamour), and online publications. She has made several television appearances (e.g., The Rachel Ray Show, The Dr. Phil Show, ABC (20/20), NBC National News) and conducted over 50 national radio interviews (e.g., NPR) and podcasts. Meston is also a co-author (with Irwin Goldstein, Susan Davis, and Abulmaged Traish) of the book Women’s Sexual Function and Dysfunction, which was published in 2006.

She is a past president of the International Society for the Study of Women’s Sexual Health and an elected member of the International Academy of Sex Research, the Society for the Scientific Study of Sex, and the Association for Psychological Science.

In 2005, Meston was selected as Chair of the orgasm committee for the World Health Organization. The express goal of the committee was to develop an operational definition of female orgasm. The definition developed by Meston and colleagues is still in active use by the W.H.O. Meston has served as a consultant to the U.S. Food and Drug Administration and to numerous pharmaceutical companies who are developing drugs to enhance women’s sexual function.

Awards for Meston’s research include a fellowship from The Ford Foundation, an International Research Award from the Athena Institute for Women’s Wellness, a Distinguished Professor Award from the Canadian Research Foundation, the Raymond Dickson Centennial Endowed Teaching Fellowship, the Wulf H. Utian Endowed Lecturer Award from the North American Menopause Society, and the Career Service Award from the International Society for the Study of Women’s Sexual Health. She has won ten awards for best peer-reviewed manuscript by international academic societies. She is an elected Fellow of the Society for the Scientific Study of Sexuality.

== Selected research areas ==
Female Sexual Arousal and the Sympathetic Nervous System: Historically, clinicians, researchers, and theorists believed the early stages of arousal in women were facilitated by the parasympathetic nervous system (PNS) and inhibited by the sympathetic nervous system (SNS). While this relationship had never been tested empirically in women, it was assumed to be true based on analogous research on the erectile response in men. Meston was the first researcher to directly examine the role of the SNS in the female sexual response, conducting a series of experiments on humans and animals and finding that, contrary to popular thought, SNS activation does not simply impair sexual arousal in women. Rather, Meston’s research suggests that optimal SNS activation seems to be necessary for the development of female physiological sexual arousal. Meston has conducted numerous follow-up studies examining how these results vary in women with autonomic impairments as a function of anxiety, post-traumatic stress disorder, and antidepressant usage. Most recently, Meston has explored the overall balance between the SNS and PNS (i.e., heart rate variability) as an important marker and treatment target for female sexual function.

Sexual Motivation: Few researchers have historically examined sexual motives in women, assuming such motives were likely self-explanatory: for pleasure, for procreation, for love. Together with evolutionary psychologist David Buss, Meston questioned the simplicity of these assumptions and conducted a large-scale study of sexual motives, finding that women actually report 237 distinct reasons for having sex that range from experience-seeking to mate-guarding. Meston has also conducted a series of follow-up studies finding that such motives vary based on sexual satisfaction levels and age.

Childhood Sexual Abuse: Among the long-term symptoms found to exist decades following childhood sexual abuse (CSA) is a broad spectrum of sexual difficulties in adulthood. Meston has conducted a series of studies seeking to understand the mechanisms by which those sexual difficulties develop, including the degree to which the CSA is integrated into the individual’s sexual self-schema and the degree to which the individual identifies as being a victim of sexual abuse. Based on these cognitive mechanisms, Meston developed an expressive writing intervention for sexual trauma that has been found to be efficacious in reducing sexual difficulties following CSA.

Psychometric Development: Meston has developed a number of questionnaires and psychometric tools to measure constructs in sexuality ranging from sexual function to sexual satisfaction. She co-authored the Female Sexual Function Index, which is the most widely used psychometric measure of female sexual function. She also authored the Sexual Satisfaction Scale for Women, the Why Have Sex Questionnaire, and the Cues for Sexual Desire Scale.

== Books ==
- Meston, C. M., & Buss, D. M. (2009). Why Women Have Sex: Sexual Motivation from Adventure to Revenge (and Everything in Between). New York: Henry Holt and Company, Inc. (Translated into 9 languages).
- Goldstein, I, Meston, C. M., Davis, S. R., & Traish, A. M. (Eds.) (2006). Women’s Sexual Function and Dysfunction. London: Taylor & Francis Group.

== Selected publications ==
- Meston, C. M., & Gorzalka, B. B. (1995). The effects of sympathetic activation on physiological and subjective sexual arousal in women. Behaviour Research and Therapy, 33, 651-664.
- Meston, C. M., & Frohlich, P. F. (2000). The neurobiology of sexual function. Archives of General Psychiatry, 57, 1012-1030.
- Meston, C. M., Rellini, A. H., & Heiman, J. R. (2006). Women’s history of sexual abuse, their sexuality, and sexual self-schemas. Journal of Consulting and Clinical Psychology, 74, 229-236.
- Meston, C. M., & Buss, D. (2007). Why humans have sex. Archives of Sexual Behavior, 36, 477-507.
- Lorenz, T. K., & Meston, C. M. (2012). Acute exercise improves physical sexual arousal in women taking antidepressants. Annals of Behavioral Medicine, 43, 352-361.
- Meston, C. M., Lorenz, T, K. A., & Stephenson, K. R. (2013). Effects of expressive writing on sexual dysfunction, depression, and PTSD in women with a history of childhood sexual abuse: Results from a randomized clinical trial. Journal of Sexual Medicine, 10, 2177-2189.
- Harte, C. B., Watts, T. W., & Meston, C. M. (2013). Predictors of 1-, 6-, and 12-month smoking relapse among smokers completing a tobacco cessation intervention program. Journal of Substance Abuse, 18, 405-416.
- Lorenz, T. K., & Meston, C. M. (2014) Exercise improves sexual function in women taking antidepressants: results from a randomized crossover trial. Depression and Anxiety, 31, 188-195.
- Kilimnik, C. D., Boyd, R. L., Stanton, A. M., & Meston, C. M. (2018). Identification of nonconsensual sexual experiences and the sexual self-schemas of women: Implications for sexual functioning. Archives of Sexual Behavior, 47, 1633-1647.
- Meston, C. M. & Stanton, A. S. (2018). Desynchrony between subjective and physiological sexual arousal in women: Theoretically interesting but clinically irrelevant. Current Sexual Health Reports, 1-3.
- Stanton, A. S., Boyd, R. L., Fogarty, J. J., & Meston, C. M. (2019). Heart rate variability biofeedback increases sexual arousal among women with female sexual arousal disorder: Results from a randomized-controlled trial. Behavior Research and Therapy, 115, 90-102.
- Meston, C. M., & Stanton, A. S. (2019). Understanding sexual arousal and subjective-genital arousal desynchrony in women. Nature Reviews Urology, 16, 107-120.
- Freihart, B. K.., & Meston, C. M. (2019). Preliminary evidence for a relationship between physiological synchrony and sexual satisfaction. Journal of Sexual Medicine, 16 (12), 2000 – 2010.
