= Arthur A. Dole =

American psychologist

- Born: United States
- Education: Antioch College, 1946
- Scientific career
- Fields: Psychology, education
- Workplaces: University of Pennsylvania

Arthur A. Dole is an emeritus professor of education at the University of Pennsylvania. In 1992, Dole was inducted into the group of faculty at University of Pennsylvania who have served more than twenty-five years, the "Twenty-five Year Club". After retiring, he became president of People for Educational Advancement and Community Enhancement (PEACE). During the Second War, he was a "war resister" - choosing a five-year prison sentence rather than be labelled a "conscientious objector". After the war, he returned to his job at the American Friends Service Committee.
