= American Society of Clinical Hypnosis =

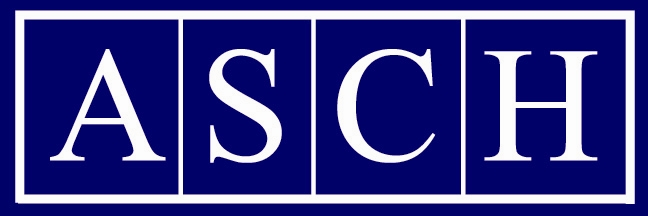
- Abbreviation: ASCH
- Established: 1957
- Founder: Milton H. Erickson
- Legal status: Organization
- Headquarters: Des Plaines, Illinois
- Members: 3100 (1998)
- Official language: English

The American Society of Clinical Hypnosis (ASCH) is a professional organization based in Bloomingdale, Illinois, dedicated to the use of hypnosis in clinical settings. Founded by Milton H. Erickson in 1957, ASCH is a U.S. based organization for health and mental health care professionals concerning clinical hypnosis.

In 1994, ASCH published Standards of Training in Clinical Hypnosis in order to standardize the process of studying and training clinicians. These were extensively updated in 2019 with revised scientific terminology.

ASCH holds an annual scientific meeting and workshops on clinical hypnosis along with a program detailing non-statutory voluntary credentialing in clinical hypnosis.

ASCH publishes the American Journal of Clinical Hypnosis (AJCH). The journal, which was founded in 1957, is peer reviewed and focuses on the scientific research and case studies on clinical hypnosis.

The society had 4500 members in 1983, but only 3100 in 1998. From 2001 onwards its recruitment benefitted from the collapse of the American Hypnosis Society.

== See also ==
- Hypnotherapy
- British Society of Clinical Hypnosis
