= 2009 Birthday Honours =

British and commonwealth honours and awards

The Queen's Birthday Honours 2009 were appointments by some of the 16 Commonwealth realms of Queen Elizabeth II to various orders and honours to recognise and reward good works by citizens of those countries. The Birthday Honours are awarded as part of the Queen's Official Birthday celebrations during the month of June.

The Queen's Birthday Honours were announced on 12 June 2009 in the United Kingdom, on 8 June 2009 in Australia, on 1 June 2009 in New Zealand, and on 15 June 2009 in The Bahamas, Grenada, Papua New Guinea, the Solomon Islands, Tuvalu, Saint Lucia, Belize, and Antigua & Barbuda.

The recipients of honours are displayed as they were styled before their new honour and arranged by the country (in order of precedence) whose ministers advised The Queen on the appointments, then by honour with grades i.e. Knight/Dame Grand Cross, Knight/Dame Commander etc. and then divisions i.e. Civil, Diplomatic and Military as appropriate.

== United Kingdom ==
=== Knight Bachelor ===
- Professor Sabaratnam Arulkumaran, Professor and Head of Obstetrics and Gynaecology and President, Royal College of Obstetricians and Gynaecologists. For services to Medicine.
- Professor David Charles Baulcombe, FRS, Professor of Botany and Royal Society Research Professor, University of Cambridge. For services to Plant Science.
- Andrew John Cash, OBE, Chief Executive, Sheffield Teaching Hospitals NHS Foundation Trust. For services to Healthcare.
- Paul Martin Ennals, CBE, Chief Executive, National Children's Bureau. For services to Children and Young People.
- Nicholas Alexander Faldo, MBE. For services to Golf.
- Paul Joseph Patrick Grant, Headteacher, Robert Clack School of Science, Barking and Dagenham, London. For services to local and national Education.
- Dr William George Hastings, CBE, Chairman, Hastings Hotels. For services to the Tourism Industry and to the community in Northern Ireland.
- John Garry Hawkes, CBE. For services to Business and to Vocational Training.
- Professor David Forbes Hendry, Professor of Economics, University of Oxford. For services to Social Science.
- Professor Deian Rhys Hopkin, Vice-Chancellor, London South Bank University. For services to Higher Education and to Skills.
- William Ian Ridley Johnston, CBE, QPM, Chief Constable, British Transport Police. For services to the Police.
- Christopher Frank Carandini Lee, CBE, Actor. For services to Drama and to Charity.
- Andrew Motion, lately Poet Laureate. For services to Literature.
- Professor Charles Duncan Rice, Principal and Vice-Chancellor, University of Aberdeen. For services to Higher Education.
- Professor Christopher Bruce Ricks, Professor of Poetry, University of Oxford and Professor of The Humanities, Boston University, USA. For services to Scholarship.
- Peter Rogers, Chief Executive, London Development Agency. For services to Local Government.
- Geoffrey Robert Rowland, Bailiff of Guernsey. For services to the Crown and the community in Guernsey.
- David Chetwode Samworth, CBE. For charitable services.
- Professor William Arnot Wakeham, Vice-Chancellor, University of Southampton. For services to Chemical Engineering and to Higher Education.

Diplomatic Service and Overseas List

- Professor Ian Brownlie, CBE, QC, Emeritus Professor of International Law, Oxford University and lately Member and Chairman of the UN International Law Commission. For services to public international law.
- Henry Neville Lindley Keswick, Chairman, Jardine Matheson. For services to British business interests overseas and charitable activities in the UK.

=== Order of the Bath ===
==== Dame Commander of the Order of the Bath (DCB) ====
Civil Division

- Karen Dunnell, National Statistician and Registrar General for England and Wales, Office for National Statistics.

==== Knight Commander of the Order of the Bath (KCB) ====
Military Division

- Vice Admiral Alan Michael Massey, CBE, ADC, C025962K.
- Lieutenant General Nicholas Ralph Parker, CBE, late The Royal Green Jackets, 496852.
- Lieutenant General Peter Anthony Wall, CBE, late Corps of Royal Engineers, 497536.
- Air Marshal Stephen Gary George Dalton, CB, Royal Air Force.

Civil Division

- Hugh Henderson Taylor, CB, Permanent Secretary, Department of Health.

==== Companion of the Order of the Bath (CB) ====
Military Division

- Rear Admiral David John Cooke, MBE, C022522H.
- Rear Admiral Neil Morisetti, C024536E.
- Rear Admiral Anthony John Rix, C023856A.
- Lieutenant General John Cooper, DSO, MBE, late The King's Own Scottish Borderers, 499682.
- Major General Christopher Colin Wilson, CBE, late Royal Regiment of Artillery, 495598.
- Air Vice-Marshal Timothy Michael Anderson, DSO, Royal Air Force.
- Air Vice-Marshal Martin John Routledge, Royal Air Force.

Civil Division

- Desmond John Bowen, CMG, Senior Civil Servant, Ministry of Defence.
- Roger Bright, Chief Executive, The Crown Estate. For public service.
- Graham Donaldson, Senior Chief Inspector, HM Inspectorate of Education, Scottish Executive.
- Victor Hogg, Deputy Director-General, Crime and Policing, Home Office.
- Vicky Pryce, Director-General Economics and Joint Head, Government Economic Service, Department for Business, Enterprise and Regulatory Reform.

=== Order of Saint Michael and Saint George ===
==== Dame Commander of the Order of St Michael and St George (DCMG) ====
- Denise Mary Holt, CMG, HM Ambassador, British Embassy, Spain.

==== Knight Commander of the Order of St Michael and St George (KCMG) ====
- Stewart Graham Eldon, CMG, OBE, UK Permanent Representative, UK Delegation to the North Atlantic Treaty Organisation, Brussels.

==== Companion of the Order of St Michael and St George (CMG) ====
- Nicholas Bernard Frank Fishwick, Counsellor, Foreign and Commonwealth Office.
- Simon James Fraser, Director General, Europe and Globalisation, Foreign and Commonwealth Office.
- Sarah Gillett, MVO, Director, Protocol, Foreign and Commonwealth Office.
- Simon Manley, Director, Defence and Strategic Threats, Foreign and Commonwealth Office.
- Christopher Norman Russell Prentice, HM Ambassador, British Embassy, Iraq.
- Geraldine Mary Nicole Reffo, lately Assistant Director, Human Resources Directorate, Foreign and Commonwealth Office.

=== Royal Victorian Order ===
==== Dame Commander of the Royal Victorian Order (DCVO) ====
- Florence Mary Fagan, JP, Lord Lieutenant of Hampshire.

==== Knight Commander of the Royal Victorian Order (KCVO) ====
- John Knollys Bather, formerly Lord Lieutenant of Derbyshire.
- The Right Reverend and Right Honourable Dr. Richard John Carew Chartres, Bishop of London and Dean of Her Majesty's Chapels Royal.
- Dr Henry William George Elwes, JP, Lord Lieutenant of Gloucestershire.
- William Joseph Hall, JP, Lord Lieutenant of County Down.
- Samuel George Armstrong, The Right Honourable The Lord Vestey, Master of the Horse.

==== Commander of the Royal Victorian Order (CVO) ====
- (Jeffrey) Michael Blackburn, formerly Trustee, The Duke of Edinburgh's Award.
- Philip Henry Christopher Jackson, Sculptor.
- Christopher James Lowe, Senior Trustee, The Duke of Edinburgh's Award.
- Rear Admiral Colin Herbert Dickinson Cooke-Priest, CB, Gentleman Usher to The Queen.
- Eric William Rainey, MBE, Director, The Duke of Edinburgh's Award, Northern Ireland.
- Colin Adair Sherman Sturmer, MVO, Formerly Land Steward, Isles of Scilly, Duchy of Cornwall.

==== Lieutenant of the Royal Victorian Order (LVO) ====
- John Douglas Chilcott, formerly Official Secretary to the Governor of Tasmania.
- Samantha Helen Cohen, Communications and Press Secretary, Royal Household.
- Group Captain Timothy Chetnole Hewlett, OBE, Royal Air Force, Director of Royal Travel.
- Professor (Norman) Ashley George Mowat, Physician to The Queen in Scotland.
- Graham Paul Sharpe, MVO, Director of Property Services, Royal Household.
- The Reverend Nicholas Charles Wheeler, Head of Church Appointments, Cabinet Office.
- Ronald John Wilkie, Operations Director, Ascot Racecourse.
- Keith Charles Willis, Finance Director, Duchy of Cornwall.

==== Member of the Royal Victorian Order (MVO) ====
- Graham Miles Bann, Executive Director, Business in the Community.
- Douglas Alexander Bowie, Director of Finance, The Prince's Scottish Youth Business Trust.
- Ian David Cornish, Head of Audit Services, Royal Household.
- Stephen John Luke Davies, Financial Controller, Duchy of Lancaster.
- Rosanna Young De Sancha, Paintings Conservator, Royal Collection.
- Leona Mary Harvey, Personal Secretary to the Governor of Newfoundland and Labrador.
- Paul Hughes, Chief Clerk and Accountant, The Duke of Edinburgh's Household.
- Dr Joanna Mary Marschner, Senior Curator, Kensington Palace, Historic Royal Palaces.
- Allan David Masson, RVM, Mechanic, Balmoral Estate.
- Sergeant Stephen William Mayne, Metropolitan Police. For services to Royalty Protection.
- Nigel Robert McEvoy, RVM, Palace Steward, Royal Household.
- Edward Peter Mills, RVM, French Polisher, Royal Household.
- Victor James Mitchell, Steward of the Bellringers, College of St. George.
- Shutica Patel, Head of Photographic Services, Royal Collection.
- Inspector Charles Caird Walker, Metropolitan Police. For services to Royalty Protection.

==== Medal of the Royal Victorian Order (RVM) ====
In Silver

- Thomas Oliver Biddlecombe, Head Gardener, Royal Lodge.
- Anthony David Chambers, Plumber, Crown Estate, Windsor.
- George Martin Clink, Foreman, Palace of Holyroodhouse.
- Philip Ernest Easton, formerly Deputy Custody Supervisor, Hampton Court Palace.
- David Robert Fagg, Divisional Sergeant Major, The Queen's Bodyguard of the Yeomen of the Guard.
- Peter Charles Golden, Telegraph Clerk, Court Post Office, Buckingham Palace.
- Clive Peter Hobbs, Assistant Valet to The Prince of Wales.
- James Priestley Hoyle, Warehouse Manager, Royal Collection Enterprises.
- Huw Gordon Jones, Tractor Driver/Stock Man, Royal Farms, Windsor.
- Anne McGowan, Senior Retail Assistant, Lower Ward Shop, Windsor Castle.
- Alan Michael Palmer, Gardener, Crown Estate, Windsor.
- Constable Jean-François Phillips, Metropolitan Police. For services to Royalty Protection.
- Charles Edwards Potts, formerly Security Officer Team Leader, Palace of Holyroodhouse.
- John Revill, Valet to The Duke of York.
- John Albert Tarrant, Assistant Warden/Cleaner, Queen's Gate Flats, Windsor.

=== Order of the British Empire ===
==== Dame Commander of the Order of the British Empire (DBE) ====
Civil Division

- Dr Barbara Ann Hakin, OBE, Chief Executive, NHS East Midlands Strategic Health Authority. For services to Healthcare.
- Prof Linda Partridge, CBE, Weldon Professor of Biometry and Director, Institute of Healthy Ageing, University College London. For services to Science.
- Gail Ruth Rebuck, CBE, Chair and Chief Executive, The Random House Group UK. For services to the Publishing Industry.
- Dr Philippa Margaret Russell, CBE. For services to Disabled Children, Young People and Family Carers.
- Prof Joan Kathleen Stringer, CBE, Principal and Vice-Chancellor, Edinburgh Napier University. For services to local and national Higher Education.
- Mitsuko Uchida, CBE, Pianist. For services to Classical Music.

==== Commander of the Order of the British Empire (CBE) ====
Military Division

Royal Navy

- Commodore Eric Fraser, C025300M.
- Commodore David John Jarvis, C022597L.
- Commodore David George Steel, C027654J.

Army

- Colonel Kevin Thomas Haugh, MBE, late The Staffordshire Regiment, 505976.
- Major General Alan Hawley, OBE, QHP, late Royal Army Medical Corps, 504232.
- Major General David McDowall, MBE, late Royal Corps of Signals, 505997.
- Brigadier Christopher John Raymond Parker, OBE, late Royal Army Medical Corps, 520533.

Royal Air Force

- Group Captain Russell William La Forte, MBE, Royal Air Force Regiment.
- Air Commodore Gordon Moulds, MBE.
- Group Captain Mark Andrew Sibley.

Civil Division

- Dr Anas Al-Shaikh Ali, Academic Adviser, London Office, International Institute of Islamic Thought. For services to Community Relations.
- Sarah Andrews, Director of Nursing, Eastern Coastal Kent Primary Care Trust. For services to Healthcare.
- Prof Andrew Ashworth, Chairman, Sentencing Advisory Panel. For services to the Administration of Justice.
- Narendra Bajaria. For services to Urban and Rural Planning and to the Peak District National Park.
- Dr Nicholas Martin Limer Barnes. For services to Civil Engineering.
- Prof Carol Elaine Baxter, Head of Equality and Diversity, NHS Employers. For services to Equal Opportunities.
- Keith Leonard Bedell-Pearce, Chairman, Directgov. For public service.
- Michael John Bell, lately Group Director of Safety Regulation, Civil Aviation Authority. For services to the Aviation Industry.
- Cicely Frances Berry, OBE, Voice Director, Royal Shakespeare Company. For services to Drama.
- Dr Penelope Jane Bevan, Director of Emergency Preparedness Division, Department of Health.
- David Blanchflower. For services to Economics and to the Monetary Policy Committee, Bank of England.
- Michael Thomas Brace, OBE, lately Chairman, Paralympics GB. For services to Disabled Sport.
- The Rev Dr Stuart John Burgess, Chairman, Commission for Rural Communities. For public and voluntary service.
- Prof Yvonne Helen Carter, OBE, Pro-Vice-Chancellor for Regional Engagement, University of Warwick. For services to Medical Education.
- Christopher John Adrian Chivers, lately Chief Inspector of Criminal Justice. For services to the Administration of Justice in Northern Ireland.
- Roy Clark, QPM, Director, Criminal Investigations, HM Revenue & Customs.
- Christopher Michael Clarke, Director, National Gallery of Scotland. For services to the Visual Arts.
- Dr Stephen Cleobury, Director of Music, King's College, University of Cambridge. For services to Music.
- Nicholas David Coleridge, Managing Director, Condé Nast UK. For services to the Magazine Publishing Industry.
- John Francis Collins, lately Deliverer of the Vote, House of Commons.
- Prof Paul David Corrigan, lately Director of Strategy and Commissioning, NHS London Strategic Health Authority. For services to Healthcare.
- Prof Anne Dell, Professor of Carbohydrate Biochemistry, Imperial College London. For services to Science.
- James Robert Drummond, Director for South Asia, Department for International Development.
- Lindsay Vere Duncan, Actor. For services to Drama.
- Prof Steven Edwards, lately Chief Executive, Veterinary Laboratories Agency, Department for Environment, Food and Rural Affairs.
- James French, Chairman and Chief Executive Officer, Flybe. For services to the Airline Industry.
- Margaret Galliers, Principal, Leicester College. For services to local and national Further Education.
- Stephen John Geraghty, Commissioner, Child Maintenance Enforcement Commission, Department for Work and Pensions.
- Prof Lynn Faith Gladden, OBE, Shell Professor of Chemical Engineering and Head, Department of Chemical Engineering and Biotechnology, University of Cambridge. For services to Chemical Engineering.
- Dr William James Gunnyeon, Director, Health, Work and Wellbeing and Chief Medical Adviser, Department for Work and Pensions.
- Peter Hawthorne, Head of 14-19 Development, Wolverhampton City Council. For services to Education and to Local Government.
- Alastair Hignell, lately Rugby Commentator. For services to Sport and to Charity.
- Susan Katrina Hodgkiss, Chair, William Hare. For services to Industry and to the community in the North West.
- William Frederick Hughes, QPM. For services to Law Enforcement.
- Dr Judith Ann Hulf, Consultant Anaesthetist, University College London Hospitals NHS Foundation Trust and President, Royal College of Anaesthetists. For services to Medicine.
- June Jacobs. For services to Human Rights and to Inter-Faith Relations.
- Dean James, Chief Operating Officer, Corporate IT, Department for Work and Pensions. For public and voluntary service.
- John Henry Kellas, lately Chairman, International Auditing and Assurance Standards Board. For services to the Accountancy Profession.
- Rosemary Margaret Kennedy, TD, Chief Nursing Officer for Wales, Welsh Assembly Government. For public and voluntary service.
- Peter Arthur King, lately Chief Executive, British Cycling Federation. For services to Sport.
- Prof Christopher John Lamb, FRS, Director, John Innes Centre, Norwich. For services to Plant Science.
- Patricia Anne Langham, Headmistress, Wakefield Girls' High School and Co-Chair, Independent and State Schools Partnership Forum. For services to local and national Education.
- Alastair Lansley, Architect. For services to Public Transport Architecture.
- Prof Quentin John Leiper, Group Chief Engineer, Carillion and lately President, Institution of Civil Engineers. For services to the Sustainability Agenda.
- John Paul Martin, Chief Social Services Officer, Department of Health and Social Services, Northern Ireland Executive. For public and voluntary service.
- Brian McAlinden, Headteacher, Castlemilk High School, Glasgow. For services to Education.
- Paula McDonald, Deputy Director, Economic and Domestic Affairs Secretariat, Cabinet Office.
- Judith McKnight, OBE. For services to Trade Unions and to Equal Opportunities.
- The Very Rev Dr Andrew Rankin Cowie McLellan, HM Chief Inspector of Prisons for Scotland.
- Dr Elaine McMahon, Chief Executive and Principal, Hull Group of Colleges. For services to local and national Further Education.
- Isabella McNally, Principal, Fountain Primary School, Londonderry. For services to Education in Northern Ireland.
- Councillor John Merry, Leader, Salford City Council. For services to Local Government.
- David Mlinaric. For services to Interior Design and to Heritage.
- Shaukat Moledina. For services to Social Housing and to Charity.
- Lindsay Stuart William Montgomery, Chief Executive, Scottish Legal Aid Board. For services to the Administration of Justice.
- John O'Neill, Director of Social Security Policy and Legislation Division, Department for Social Development, Northern Ireland Executive. For public and voluntary service.
- Stephen John Pollard, Director Commercial, Directorate General Saudi Armed Forces Projects, Ministry of Defence.
- Simon John Preston, OBE, Organist. For services to Classical Music.
- Dr Katharine Bridget Pretty, Principal, Homerton College, Cambridge, and Pro-Vice-Chancellor, University of Cambridge. For services to Higher Education.
- Sir William Henry Proby, Bt., DL, lately Chairman, National Trust. For services to Conservation and to Heritage.
- Jonathan Pryce, Actor. For services to Drama.
- Alice Loretto Quinn, Chair, Health Promotion Agency Northern Ireland. For services to Healthcare.
- Dr June Munro Raine, Director, Vigilance and Risk Management of Medicines, Medicines and Healthcare products Regulatory Agency, Department of Health.
- Joyce Redfearn, Chief Executive, Wigan Borough Council. For services to Local Government.
- Elizabeth Rushton Redfern, Director, Patient Care and Nursing, South West Strategic Health Authority. For services to Healthcare.
- Philip Francis Robinson, Managing Director, SELEX Communications. For services to the Defence Industry.
- Guy Ryder. For services to International Trade Unionism.
- Patricia Samuel, Deputy Director, Public Sector Partnerships, Office of the Third Sector, Cabinet Office. For public and voluntary service.
- Peter Saraga, OBE, Vice-President, Royal Academy of Engineering and lately President, Institute of Physics. For services to Science and to Engineering.
- Peter Sebastian, Senior Civil Servant, Ministry of Defence.
- Ian Shott. For services to the Chemical Engineering Industry.
- Dr Elizabeth Sidwell, Chief Executive, Haberdashers' Aske's Federation, Lewisham, London. For services to local and national Education.
- Dr Malcolm Skingle, Director, Academic Liaison, Worldwide Business Development, GlaxoSmithKline. For services to the Pharmaceutical Industry.
- Jane Slowey, Chief Executive, Foyer Federation. For services to Disadvantaged Young People.
- Delia Smith, OBE, Cookery Writer and Broadcaster. For services to the Food Industry.
- Dr James Matheson Smith, Chairman, Shell UK. For services to the Oil and Gas industries.
- Michael Thomas Smyth, Partner, Clifford Chance. For services to Pro Bono Legal Work.
- Paul Snell, lately Chief Inspector of Social Services. For services to Local Government.
- Christine Joy Stewart, lately Director, Criminal Law and Sentencing Policy, Ministry of Justice.
- James Robert Stewart, Chairman, Warrenpoint Harbour Authority. For services to the Ports Industry in Northern Ireland.
- Christopher Tailby, Director, Anti-Avoidance Group, HM Revenue & Customs.
- Jeffrey Tatham-Banks. For services to the Fashion Industry and to Charity.
- Richard James Thomas, Information Commissioner. For public service.
- Prof Peter Toyne. For services to the community in Liverpool.
- David Turrell, Headteacher, Sir Bernard Lovell School, Bristol, and Chairman, Kingswood 14-19 Partnership. For services to local and national Education.
- Rumi Verjee. For charitable services.
- Graham Vick, Artistic Director, Birmingham Opera Company. For services to Opera.
- John Robert Walker, lately Chief Executive, English Partnerships. For services to Regeneration.
- Sandra Walker, Deputy Director, Children's Services Division, Legal Advisers' Office, Department for Children, Schools and Families.
- James Wardrope, Consultant in Emergency Medicine, Northern General Hospital NHS Trust, Sheffield. For services to Medicine.
- Prof David Allan Warner, Vice-Chancellor, Swansea Metropolitan University. For services to local and national Higher Education.
- Robert Warner, lately Chief Executive, Remploy. For services to Disabled People.
- Prof David Clifford Stephen White, lately Director, Institute of Food Research. For services to Biological Sciences.
- Keith George White, Chief Executive, Crown Agents. For services to International Development.
- Pamela Whittle, lately Director of Public Health, Scottish Executive.
- Peter Kenneth Wilkinson, Managing Director of Policy, Research and Studies, Audit Commission. For services to Local Government.
- Alwen Williams, Chief Executive, Tower Hamlets Primary Care Trust. For services to Healthcare.
- Anne Elizabeth Williams, lately Strategic Director, Health and Social Care, Salford Council. For services to Local Government.
- Dr Juliet Susan Durrant Williams. For services to the Tourist and Creative Industries.
- Peter Robert Williams, Chief Executive, Quality Assurance Agency, and lately President, European Association for Quality Assurance in Higher Education. For services to Quality Assurance.
- Prof George Gray Youngson, Consultant Paediatric Surgeon, Royal Aberdeen Children's Hospital, and Honorary Professor of Paediatric Surgery, Aberdeen University. For services to Medicine.
- Prof Graham John Zellick, lately Chairman, Criminal Cases Review Commission. For services to the Administration of Justice.

Diplomatic Service and Overseas List

- Stephen Burrows, Principal of Arup. For services to civil engineering overseas.
- The Honourable Alfred Thomas Oughton, MBE, lately President of the Senate, Bermuda.
- Prof Elmer Gethin Rees, Counsellor, Foreign and Commonwealth Office.
- Vidal Sassoon. For services to the British hairdressing industry.

==== Officer of the Order of the British Empire (OBE) ====
Military Division

Royal Navy

- Commander Alan Joseph Dorricott, C033137X.
- Commander Paul Edward Dunn, C034996D.
- Commodore Richard Culworth Hawkins, C022638R.
- Commander Colin Ross MacKay, C033523P.
- Colonel John Alexander McCardle, Royal Marines, N029187H.
- Commander Mark Anthony Pomeroy, C036420F.
- Commander David Shutts, C032682B.
- Commander (now Captain) John Stuart Weale, C032877C.

Army

- Lieutenant Colonel Benjamin Lister Baldwin, The Parachute Regiment, 519627.
- Acting Colonel Robert James Carruthers, TD, Warwickshire and West Midlands (South Sector) Army Cadet Force, 485135.
- Colonel Neil James Dalton, late Army Air Corps, 526878.
- Lieutenant Colonel Brian Giles De La Haye, The Royal Regiment of Scotland, 498920.
- Lieutenant Colonel Frederick Ernest Hargreaves, Royal Corps of Signals, 539573.
- Lieutenant Colonel Frazer Micheal Lawrence, The Duke of Lancaster's Regiment, 533497.
- Colonel Derek Arthur McAvoy, late Corps of Royal Electrical and Mechanical Engineers, 534072.
- Colonel Nicholas Paul McRobb, late Royal Regiment of Artillery, 525444.
- Lieutenant Colonel Adrian Gareth Parker, Corps of Royal Engineers, 523955.
- Lieutenant Colonel Jonathan Charles Price, MBE, The Yorkshire Regiment, 537537.
- Lieutenant Colonel Peter Antony Stanworth, TD, Royal Army Medical Corps, Territorial Army, 469520.
- Lieutenant Colonel George Clark Wilson, The Royal Regiment of Scotland, 518980.

Royal Air Force

- Group Captain Kevin Douglas Connor (8141093D).
- Group Captain Antony James Innes (8029410H).
- Group Captain Michael Christopher Longstaff (8027030S).
- Group Captain Gavin Douglas Anthony Parker (5207719R).
- Group Captain Paul Christopher Ridge (5203288J).
- Wing Commander James Edwin Savage (2633340G).
- Wing Commander Martin George Smith (8217247B).

Civil Division

- Gurdev Kaur Abrol. For voluntary service to Sikh and Asian Women in the West Midlands.
- Professor David Llewellyn Adamson. For services to Regeneration in Wales.
- David Allan. For services to Mountain Rescue in England and Wales.
- Philippa Allan. For services to Business in the East Midlands and to International Trade.
- James Allan Anderson, MBE. For services to Swimming.
- Margaret Anderson, Headteacher, Sele First School, Hexham, Northumberland. For services to Education.
- Michael Gordon Ankers, Chief Executive, Construction Products Association. For services to the Construction Industry.
- Paul Stephen Aplin. For public service and for services to the Accountancy Profession.
- Jennette Arnold. For services to Local Government and to the community in London.
- John Christopher Aston. For services to Business.
- Reshard Sheik Mahmad Auladin, lately Deputy Chairman, Metropolitan Police Authority. For services to the Police and to the Administration of Justice.
- Richard Austin, Headteacher, Higher Bebington Junior School, Wirral. For services to Education.
- Herbert Howard Baggaley, Chairman, Baggaley Group Ltd. For services to Training and to Business.
- Jennifer Ann Barraclough, Television Producer. For services to Documentary Film Making and to Charity.
- Lawrence Neil Barry. For services to Humanitarian Aid.
- Andrew John Beale. For services to Intellectual Property and to Business in Wales.
- Ian Agar Bell, Director, ARC Addington Fund. For services to Farming Families.
- Professor Mark Anderson Bellis, Director, Centre for Public Health, John Moores University. For services to Healthcare.
- Amanda Sonia Berry, Chief Executive, British Academy of Film and Television Arts. For services to the Film Industry.
- Michael Gerald Alexander Black, lately Director, Northern Ireland Science Park Foundation Ltd. For services to Business.
- Adam Krysztof Bogusz, Deputy Head of Banking, London, HM Revenue and Customs.
- Professor David John Breeze, lately Chief Inspector of Ancient Monuments, Historic Scotland, Scottish Executive.
- Elizabeth, Lady Brighouse, Leader of Labour Group, Oxfordshire County Council. For services to Local Government.
- Nigel Brook, Assistant Chief Officer and Director of Finance, West Yorkshire Police. For services to the Police.
- Professor Peter Brophy, lately Professor of Information Management, Manchester Metropolitan University. For services to Visually Impaired People.
- Derek Brown, Managing Director, FTX Logistics. For services to the Defence Industry.
- Mary Elizabeth Brown. For voluntary service to the Association of Wrens.
- Richard Broyd. For services to Heritage and to Conservation.
- Lindsey Alexander Bucknor, Head, Workforce Expansion, Jobcentre Plus, Department for Work and Pensions.
- Professor Robert Burch, lately McClay Professor of Physical Chemistry and Head of the School of Chemistry and Chemical Engineering, Queen's University Belfast. For services to Chemistry.
- Professor Frank Burchill. For services to the Advisory, Conciliation and Arbitration Service.
- Arthur James Burden. For charitable services.
- Michael John Clement Burgess, Coroner for Surrey. For services to the Administration of Justice.
- Roy Button, Senior Vice-President and Managing Director, Warner Brothers Productions. For services to the Film Industry.
- Karen Evelyn Campbell, Grade 7, Department of Health, Social Services and Public Safety, Northern Ireland Executive.
- Mary Lorrimer Beatrix Campbell. For services to Equal Opportunities.
- Patrick John Casement, Chairman, National Trust's Committee for Northern Ireland. For services to Heritage.
- Dr Timothy Lachlan Chambers, JP, Consultant Physician and Nephrologist, Bristol Royal Hospital for Children. For services to Medicine.
- Lucy Bertha, Lady Chandler. For services to the Voluntary Sector.
- Martin Cheeseman, Director of Housing and Community Care, London Borough of Brent. For services to Local Government.
- Nasso Christou, Head of Archway Children's Centre, London Borough of Islington. For services to Children and Families.
- Ailsa Claire, Chief Executive, Barnsley Primary Care Trust. For services to Healthcare.
- Dr Thomas Antony Coffey, General Medical Practitioner, South West London. For services to Healthcare.
- Felicity Elaine Collier. For services to Children and Families.
- Richard Collins, lately Executive Director for Policy, Legal Services Commission. For services to the Administration of Justice.
- Marilyn Comrie, Managing Director, LeaderGen. For services to Women's Enterprise.
- Carol Lesley Coombes. For services to Leadership and to the Voluntary Sector in Birmingham.
- Philip Coppard, Chief Executive, Barnsley Metropolitan Borough Council. For services to Local Government.
- Alison Mary Egerton Corbett. For voluntary service to the Soldiers', Sailors' and Airmen's Families Association in Gwynedd.
- John Barrie William Corless, Chairman and Trustee, PHAB. For voluntary service to Disabled People.
- Anita Cormac, Executive Director, Focus on Food Campaign and Co-director, Design Dimension Educational Trust. For services to Special Education.
- Professor Frances Marie Corner, Head, London College of Fashion. For services to the Fashion Industry.
- Professor David Cox, Chairman, South Birmingham Primary Care Trust. For services to Healthcare.
- Gary Crosby, Artistic Director, Tomorrow's Warriors. For services to Music.
- Mary Gray Cuthbert, Head, Tobacco Control, Sexual Health and HIV, Health Directorate, Scottish Executive. For public and voluntary service.
- Thomas Emment Meredydd David, Principal, Reaseheath College, Cheshire. For services to local and national Further Education.
- Elaine Debono, Head of Rural Payments, Welsh Assembly Government.
- Mary Dhonau, Chief Executive, National Flood Forum. For services to the Environment.
- The Honourable Peter Malcolm de Brissac Dickinson, Author and Poet. For services to Literature.
- Dr Annette Doherty, Senior Vice-President, Pfizer Global Research and Development, Sandwich Laboratories UK. For services to the Pharmaceutical Industry.
- Helen Donoghue. For services to Charity Taxation.
- Katharine Emma Dore, Co-founder, TreeHouse School, Muswell Hill, London. For services to Special Needs Education.
- Carol Dover, lately Headteacher, Lees Brook Community Sports College, and Da Vinci Community College, Derby. For services to Education.
- Janet Dunn, Headteacher, I CAN Meath Non-Maintained Special School, Ottershaw, Surrey. For services to Special Needs Education.
- Joseph Dunne. For services to Victim Support in Northern Ireland.
- Anthony John Durcan, President, Society of Chief Librarians and Head, Culture, Libraries and Lifelong Learning, Newcastle upon Tyne City Council. For services to Local Libraries.
- Peter Ronald Dymond, Project Manager and lately Chief Coastguard, Maritime and Coastguard Agency, Department for Transport.
- Timothy East, Deputy Director (Operations), Information Management Services, HM Revenue and Customs.
- Eurwen Holland Edwards, BEM. For voluntary service to the community in North Wales.
- Suzy Maria Brain England, Chair, Standards Committee, Department for Work and Pensions. For public service.
- Dr Margaret Lindsay Faull, Director, National Coal Mining Museum for England. For services to Industrial Heritage.
- Nelson Fernandez, lately Deputy Director, Visiting Arts. For services to the Arts.
- James Ferris, lately Chief Executive, Percy Hedley Foundation, Newcastle upon Tyne. For services to local and national Special Needs Education.
- Rokhsana Fiaz, Director, Change Institute. For services to Black and Minority Ethnic People.
- John Allan Findlay, Chief Executive, National Association of Local Councils. For services to Local Government.
- John Fletcher. For services to the Inland Waterways.
- Paul Foweather, Senior Manager A, HM Prison Hull, Ministry of Justice. For public and voluntary service.
- Tim Foy. For public service.
- Dr Derek John Fry. For public service.
- Keith Fryer, lately Head of Centre, Harperley Hall, National Policing Improvement Agency. For services to Forensic Science.
- Patricia Gamble, Court Manager, Nottingham Crown Court, Ministry of Justice.
- Michael Gelling, Chairman, Tenants' and Residents' Organisations of England. For services to Social Housing.
- Annette Gibbons. For services to the Food and Farming Industries in Cumbria.
- Judith Kyle Gillespie. For public service.
- Professor Helen Gleeson, Head of School of Physics and Astronomy, University of Manchester. For services to Science.
- Lois Patricia Golding (Peaches Golding). For services to Black and Minority Ethnic People in the South West.
- Professor Peter Mitchell Grant, Regius Professor of Engineering and Electronics, University of Edinburgh. For services to Science.
- Richard Grant. For services to the Energy Industry.
- Malcolm David Graves, Press Secretary, Communications, HM Treasury. For public and voluntary service.
- John Bullard Gray, Chairman, Coatbridge College Board of Management. For services to Further and Higher Education.
- John Norman Gripper. For services to Rhino Conservation and to Animal Welfare.
- Terence Michael Grote, lately Managing Director, The Independent. For services to the Publishing Industry.
- David Leslie Grove, Chairman, West Midlands Industrial Board. For services to Business.
- Henry Grunwald, QC. For services to the Jewish community and to Inter-Faith Relations.
- Thomas Hanna Haire. For public and voluntary service.
- Nigel Hancock, Senior Manager A, Safer Custody Group, HM Prison Service, Ministry of Justice.
- Dr Christopher Handy, Chief Executive, Accord Housing Group and Chairman, Walsall Housing Regeneration Agency. For services to the Housing Sector in the West Midlands.
- Dr Robert Wallace Harland. For services to Sports and Exercise Medicine in Northern Ireland.
- Ann Whyte Harris, Deputy Director, Investment Management, Department for Work and Pensions.
- Margaret Mary Haskell, Director of Human Resources, Avon Fire and Rescue Service. For services to Local Government.
- Lynda Hassall, Head, Sure Start Children's Centre, Carlisle South. For services to Children and Families.
- Professor Gerard Hastings, Director, Institute of Social Marketing, and Centre for Tobacco Control Research, Stirling, and The Open University. For services to Healthcare.
- Geoffrey Heath, lately Chief Executive, NCsoft Europe. For services to the Computer Games Industry.
- Professor Andrew Hurst Henderson. For services to Cardiology in Wales.
- Alan William Henry, lately Northern Ireland Civil Service Commissioner and Human Rights Commissioner. For public service.
- Alan Eric Hepper, Grade B1, Ministry of Defence.
- Marilyn Holness, Deputy Principal, Southlands College, Roehampton University. For services to Teacher Education.
- Susan Hooton, Associate Director, Clinical Governance and Effectiveness, 5 Boroughs Partnership NHS Trust. For services to Nursing.
- Dr Mohammed Kamal Hossain, Director, Research and International Co-operation, National Physical Laboratory. For services to Industry.
- Andrew William Howarth, Director of Operations, Land Registry, Ministry of Justice.
- Peter Howson. For services to the Visual Arts.
- Bernard Clement John Hughes, Chairman, Regional Management Board, Fire and Rescue Service South West. For services to Local Government.
- Dr Robert William Gainer Hunt. For services to the Field of Colour Science and to Young People through Crusaders.
- Sue Johnston, Actor. For services to Drama and to Charity.
- Brian Keith Jones, Regional Director, North West, Forestry Commission.
- Glyn Hywel Jones, Principal, Pembrokeshire College. For services to Education and to Training in Wales.
- Louis Bernard Jones, Deputy Chief Fire Officer, Northern Ireland Fire and Rescue Service. For services to Local Government.
- Rhoda Emlyn Jones, Principal Officer for Substance Misuse Services, Cardiff and the Vale of Glamorgan. For services to Disadvantaged People.
- Imelda Ann Jordan, Principal, St Colm's High School, Twinbrook, Belfast. For services to Education in Northern Ireland.
- Mary Helen Karaolis, Headteacher, The Ravenscroft School and Technology College, Barnet, London. For services to Education.
- Sister Eileen Kelleher, lately Chair of Council and Pro-Chancellor, Liverpool Hope University. For voluntary service to Education.
- Andrew Kilpatrick, lately Headteacher, Northumberland Park Community School, Haringey, London. For services to Education.
- Professor Terence Robert James Lappin, Professor of Haematology, Queen's University Belfast. For services to Medicine.
- Fiona Larden, Principal, Fircroft College, Birmingham. For services to Adult Education.
- Richard James Vincent Larn. For services to Nautical Archaeology and Marine Heritage.
- James Victor Lawlor, Deputy Director with Detection, London, UK Border Agency, HM Revenue and Customs. For public and voluntary service.
- Anne Marie Ledger. For services to Asylum Seekers and Refugees.
- Dr Aileen Lee. For services to Veterinary Medicine, Department for Environment, Food and Rural Affairs.
- Professor Gwyneth Helen Lewis, National Lead for Maternal Health and Maternity Services, Department of Health.
- Colin Liddell, Director, Liddell Thomson. For services to Business and to Charity in Scotland.
- Brian Martin Lomax, Chairman, Supporters Direct. For services to Football.
- Jennifer Lomax. Director, Camden Arts Centre. For services to the Visual Arts.
- Fiona MacCarthy, Biographer and Cultural Historian. For services to Literature.
- Angus MacDonald, Director, Financial News, and Chairman, Specialist Waste Recycling. For services to the community in the Highlands.
- Hugh Millar MacDonald, Assistant Director, Apprenticeship Unit, Department for Innovation, Universities and Skills.
- Ann Macfarlane, MBE. For services to Disabled People.
- John Learmonth MacLellan, Senior User, MOT Computerisation, Vehicle and Operator Services Agency, Department for Transport.
- Dr Linda Magee. For services to the Biotechnology Industry.
- Margaret Fay Mansell, Chair, National Federation of Women's Institutes. For services to Women.
- Richard Mawer. For services to Save the Children UK.
- Morrison McAllister, lately Director, Food Standards Agency, Northern Ireland.
- Dennis Norman McAuley, Principal Scientific Officer, Forensic Science Northern Ireland. For public and voluntary service.
- Gracia Mary McGrath, Chief Executive, Chance UK. For services to Children with Special Needs.
- Roger Andrew McKenzie, lately Regional Secretary, Midlands Trades Union Congress. For services to Diversity and to Equal Opportunities.
- Lynn Jacqueline McNair, Head of Centre, Cowgate Under 5s Centre, Edinburgh. For services to Early Years Education.
- Kay Mellor, Writer. For services to Drama.
- Penny Melville-Brown. For services to Disabled and Disadvantaged People.
- Peter Methven. For services to the Marine Industry.
- Group Captain John Middleton, Grade B2, Ministry of Defence. For public and voluntary service.
- Margaret Glynis Miles-Bramwell, Founder and Chair, Slimming World. For services to Healthcare and to Charity.
- Alan Geoffrey Moore. For services to the Energy Industry.
- Professor Pamela Mary Moores, Executive Dean, School of Languages and Social Sciences, Aston University. For services to Modern Languages.
- Dr Elaine Morgan, Author. For services to Literature and to Education.
- James Ian Morris, President, Institute of Chartered Accountants in England and Wales. For services to the Accountancy Profession.
- Pamela Anne Morton. For services to the Voluntary Sector.
- Fiyaz Mughal, Director, Faith Matters. For services to the Voluntary Sector.
- Annie Rosaleen Mullins, Member, Home Secretary's Task Force on Child Protection on the Internet. For services to Children and Young People.
- Norris Geoffrey Myers. For services to Business in the South West and to International Trade.
- Eric Stanley Nash, lately Postgraduate Dean, Dental School, University Hospital of Wales, Cardiff. For services to Healthcare.
- Thomas Arthur Nelson. For services to Forensic Science and to the community in North Berwick, East Lothian.
- Professor Diane Newell, lately Senior Scientific Consultant, Veterinary Laboratories Agency. For services to Science.
- Michael Andrew Newman, Managing Director, Fujitsu Services Defence and Security Business Unit. For services to the Ministry of Defence.
- Professor Catherine Ann Niven. For services to Nursing and to the Allied Health Professions.
- Elaine Noad. For services to Disabled People in Scotland.
- Peter Robert Norfolk, MBE, Quad Wheelchair Tennis Champion. For services to Disabled Sport.
- Dr Margaret Rose Oates, Consultant Perinatal Psychiatrist, Nottinghamshire Healthcare Trust. For services to Mental Healthcare.
- John Owen, Managing Director, Creative Management Development. For services to the Bus Industry.
- Michael Barry Owen, Chairman, Mason Owen Partnership. For services to Business and to Charity in Liverpool.
- Lorraine Petersen, Chief Executive Officer, National Association for Special Educational Needs. For services to Education.
- James William Rodney Peyton, TD, Consultant Surgeon, South Tyrone and Craigavon Hospitals. For services to Medicine in Northern Ireland.
- Steven Pickering, Grade B2, Ministry of Defence.
- Dr Mary Piper, Senior Public Health Adviser, Offender Health, Department of Health.
- Jane Pitman, Lead Member for Children's Services, Hertfordshire County Council. For services to Local Government.
- Marion Grace Plant, Principal and Chief Executive, North Warwickshire and Hinckley College. For services to Further Education.
- Timothy George Alexander Prince, Director, Royal International Air Tattoo. For services to the RAF Charitable Trust.
- Dr Helen Raine. For services to the Agri-Food Industry.
- Dr Richard Ellison Raistrick, Grade B2, Ministry of Defence.
- Professor Ian Ralston. For services to Archaeology in Scotland.
- Dr Guduru Gopal Rao, Consultant Microbiologist, Northwick Park Hospital. For services to Medicine.
- Dr Malcolm Graham Charles Read, Executive Secretary, Joint Information Systems Committee. For services to Higher and Further Education.
- Harry Reeves, Deputy Director of Culture, Department for Culture, Media and Sport. For public and voluntary service.
- Neil John Remsbery, Team Leader, Pupil Well-being Health and Safety Unit, Department for Children, Schools and Families.
- Kim Richardson, Chair, Naval Families Federation. For services to the Royal Navy.
- Peter Anthony Lloyd Roberts, Nursing Officer, Ministry of Defence.
- Peter Fowler Robinson. For services to Business and to the community in Lancashire.
- Trevor Robinson, Creative Director, Quiet Storm. For services to the Advertising Industry.
- Professor Sheila Anne Rodwell, Director, Medical Research Council Centre for Nutrition, University of Cambridge. For services to Healthcare.
- Warwick James Rodwell. For services to Ecclesiastical Archaeology.
- Wendy Elizabeth Rose, Vice-Chair, Homestart UK. For services to Children and Families.
- Councillor Keith John Ross, Leader, West Somerset District Council, and Deputy Chairman, Local Government Association. For services to Local Government.
- Professor Christopher James Rowe, Professor of Greek, University of Durham. For services to Scholarship.
- Barbara Patricia Russell, Service Manager, Action for Children Fostering, Wessex Community Project. For services to Children and Families.
- Professor Marian Scott, Head of Department and Professor of Environmental Statistics, University of Glasgow. For services to Social Science.
- Steven Sharratt, Group Chief Executive, Bio Group Ltd. For services to Business.
- The Reverend Professor Douglas William David Shaw. For charitable services in Scotland.
- Trevor Halliday Shears. For charitable services in the North East.
- John Anthony Sherlock, Sculptor. For services to the Visual Arts in Northern Ireland.
- Jean Mary Sherriff, MBE. For services to the Citizens' Advice Bureau, Denbighshire.
- Dr John Richard Shortland, Commander, South and West Yorkshire. For voluntary service to the St. John Ambulance Brigade.
- Brian Paul Shrubsall, Grade B2, Ministry of Defence.
- Dr Caroline Mary Shuldham, Director of Nursing, Clinical Governance and Informatics, Royal Brompton Hospital and Harefield NHS Trust. For services to Healthcare.
- Colin Brian Simkins, Lead Consultant Headteacher, Specialist Schools and Academies Trust and lately Headteacher, Hodgson School, Lancashire. For services to local and national Education.
- Councillor John Hyde Smith. For voluntary service to the community in Evesham, Worcestershire.
- Michael Lynas Smith. For services to People with Disabilities.
- Ronald Smith, General-Secretary, Educational Institute of Scotland. For services to Education.
- Stuart Graham Smith, lately President, Lawn Tennis Association. For services to Sport.
- Sylvia Mary Smith, President, National Association of Swimming Clubs for People with Disabilities.
- Douglas Squires, Choreographer and Director. For services to the Performing Arts.
- Allan Stewart, Principal, Selby College, North Yorkshire. For services to local and national Further Education.
- David George Hovenden Stewart, Chairman, North East Rural Affairs Forum. For services to the Environment.
- Roger Stone, Leader, Rotherham Metropolitan Borough Council. For services to Local Government.
- Colonel Piers Atherley David Storie-Pugh, MBE, TD, DL, Head of Remembrance Travel. For services to the Royal British Legion.
- David Lewis Summers, JP. For public and charitable service.
- Peter Swingler, Benefit Delivery Centre Manager, Jobcentre Plus, Department for Work and Pensions. For public and voluntary service in the North West.
- Prof Katharine Ellen Sykes, Professor of Sciences and Society, University of Bristol. For services to Science and Technology.
- Peter William Syme, Director, The Open University in Scotland. For services to Higher Education.
- Ilana Antoinette Tahan, Head of Hebrew Collections, The British Library. For services to Scholarship.
- Virginia Tandy, Director of Culture, Manchester City Council. For services to the Arts.
- Peter Rowland Taylor. For services to the Tyre Industry.
- Peter Thackwray. For services to Small Businesses in London and to International Trade.
- George David Thompson, Business Development Director, BVT Surface Fleet Ltd. For services to the Shipbuilding Industry.
- Professor Tamar Thompson, Independent Health Service Adviser. For services to Healthcare.
- Robert Torrens. For services to Cricket and Football in Northern Ireland.
- Jane Elizabeth Tozer, MBE. For public and voluntary service.
- Leonard Tyler, Chief Executive Officer, EADS Defence and Security Systems Ltd. For services to the Defence Industry.
- Professor Denis Wesley Vernon, Head of Podiatry Services and Research Lead, Sheffield Primary Care Trust. For services to Healthcare.
- Geoffrey Harold Walker, Matron, Medical Wards and Departments, Poole Hospital NHS Foundation Trust. For services to Healthcare.
- David Ogilvie Maclogan Wedderburn, Chairman, Building Standards Advisory Committee. For services to the Construction Industry.
- William James Wilkinson, Chief Executive and Treasurer, South Yorkshire Police Authority. For public service.
- Billy Williams, Cinematographer. For services to the Film Industry.
- Professor Clyde Williams, Professor of Sports Science, Loughborough University. For services to Sports Science.
- Frederick George Wilson. For services to Entrepreneurship and to Engineering.
- Malcolm Irving Wilson, Managing Director, M-Sport, and Team Director, Ford World Rally Team. For services to the Motorsport Industry.
- Simon Winters, Charity Consultant. For services to the Voluntary Sector.
- Andrew William Lewis Wolstenholme, Director, Capital Projects, British Airports Authority. For services to the Construction Industry.
- Zena Jane Wooldridge, Director of Sport, University of Birmingham and Chair, England Squash. For services to Sport.
- Robert Andrew Woolley, Manager, Debt Relief Order Unit, Department for Business, Enterprise and Regulatory Reform. For public and voluntary service.
- John Yelland. For voluntary service to the community in Worcester.
- Anthony Yorke, National Manager, Paralympic Cycling Team. For services to Sport.

Diplomatic Service and Overseas List

- Robert Manus O'Donel Alexander, First Secretary, Foreign and Commonwealth Office.
- Trevor Andrews, First Secretary, Foreign and Commonwealth Office.
- Judith Elise Hall-Bean, Assistant Cabinet Secretary, Cabinet Office. For public service, Bermuda.
- David Vincent Wilkin Chew, Cellist, Music Teacher and Founding Director of the Rio International Cello Festival. For services to music in Brazil.
- James George Clover, First Secretary, Foreign and Commonwealth Office.
- Alan Cumming, Actor, Producer and Presenter. For services to film, theatre and the arts and to activism for equal rights for the gay and lesbian community, USA.
- Keith Robert Davies, lately Director, British Council, Vietnam.
- Robert James Harrison, First Secretary, Foreign and Commonwealth Office.
- Dr Christopher Michael Haynes, lately Managing Director, Nigeria LNG. For services to the British oil and gas industry in Nigeria.
- Isabel Nancy Hilton, Founder and Editor, China Dialogue. For services to promoting environmental awareness in China.
- Amanda Jane Ivemy, UK Border Agency International Group Regional Manager, Russian Federation and Commonwealth of Independent States.
- Benedict Hugh Kevin Llewellyn-Jones, First Secretary, Foreign and Commonwealth Office.
- Dominic MacSorley, Operations Director, Concern Worldwide, USA. For services to international humanitarian aid.
- Dr Alan Milner, Editor and Publisher of law reports. For services to good governance in Africa, the Overseas Territories and Crown Dependencies.
- Edna Marie Moyle, lately Speaker of the Legislative Assembly, Cayman Islands.
- Paul Nicholls, President and Founder, Team Continuum Inc. For services to cancer patients and their families in the US and the UK.
- Martin Elliott Rack, First Secretary, Foreign and Commonwealth Office.
- Dr Deanna Ruth Tak Yung Rudgard, Philanthropist. For services to promoting links between universities in Hong Kong and the UK.
- James Scarth, Director, British Council, Saudi Arabia.
- Rosemary Thomas, lately First Secretary, Counter Narcotics Team, British Embassy, Afghanistan.
- Ian Turner, lately Senior Prisons Adviser, British Embassy, Afghanistan.
- Prof Michael Walker, Research and Development Director, Vodafone. For services to the telecommunications industry.

==== Member of the Order of the British Empire (MBE) ====
Military Division

Royal Navy

- Chief Petty Officer Air Engineering Technician (Avionics) Garry Alexander Adams, D199085U.
- Petty Officer Logistics (Personnel) Jonathan Andrew Crockett, D226692S.
- Warrant Officer Class 1 Marine Engineering Mechanic Phillip Wilfred Drewball, D166637F.
- Chief Petty Officer Logistics (Catering Services) Mark James Finnigan, D204695L.
- Captain (Acting Major) Paul Scott Gellender, Royal Marines, N029664R.
- Major Benjamin Erik Halsted, Royal Marines, N029372V.
- Commander David Malcolm Harding, C032697A.
- Surgeon Lieutenant Lara Jane Herbert, V030836L.
- Chaplain Michael John Hills, C038474W.
- Chief Petty Officer Engineering Technician (Marine Engineering) Christopher Philip Parry, D207526V.
- Colour Sergeant (Local Warrant Officer Class 2) Philip Albert Shuttleworth, Royal Marines, P030138C.
- Lieutenant Commander Kevan William Slimmon, C038112E.
- Chief Petty Officer Air Engineering Artificer (Mechanical) Ian Macmillan Smith, D171028R.
- Warrant Officer Class 1 (Communications Information Systems Specialist) Julie Marie Wilde, W135152T.
- Petty Officer Writer Sarah Jayne Adams, W139082F. (Dated 12 June 2004)

Army

- Major Mark David Bairstow, Adjutant General's Corps (Educational and Training Support Branch) 554645.
- Major John Robert Timothy Balding, GM, The Royal Logistic Corps, 540568.
- Major Hugh James Bardell, Royal Corps of Signals, 494502.
- Major Erik Jan Bengtsson, Royal Regiment of Artillery, 539682.
- Major Alexandra Emily Carol Benn, Corps of Royal Engineers, 550621.
- Lieutenant Colonel Richard Glen Bishop, Army Air Corps, 545033.
- Major Paul Jason Blakesley, The Duke of Lancaster's Regiment, 542298.
- Major Mark William Bower, QGM, The Yorkshire Regiment, 520598.
- Major David Simon Clarke, Royal Regiment of Artillery, 539972.
- Major Paul James Clayton, The Royal Welsh, 542307.
- Warrant Officer Class 1 Simon Darran Cook, Adjutant General's Corps (Staff and Personnel Support Branch), 24706659.
- Major Joanne Sarah Devitt, Royal Army Medical Corps, 545113.
- Captain Martyn Griffiths, The Rifles, 565011.
- Major Guptaman Gurung, MVO, The Royal Gurkha Rifles, 545807.
- Lieutenant Colonel Alexander Hans Hay, Corps of Royal Engineers, 531848.
- Staff Sergeant Jacqueline Linda Herbert, Royal Corps of Signals, W0446515.
- Major Robert John Hewson, Corps of Royal Engineers, 545970.
- Warrant Officer Class 1 Peter John Hurry, Army Air Corps, 24682262.
- Acting Major Robert Charles Jones, Gwynedd Army Cadet Force, 492055.
- Captain Albert Thomas Keeling, Royal Army Medical Corps, 563204.
- Warrant Officer Class 2 Neil Gavin MacDonald, Royal Regiment of Artillery, 24884213.
- Major Brian Hillon MacIntyre, The Royal Logistic Corps, 516767.
- Lance Corporal David Alexander Mair, Royal Corps of Signals, Territorial Army, 24591426.
- Captain Thomas Malloy, The Parachute Regiment, 24697311.
- Warrant Officer Class 2 Ian Martinez, The Royal Gibraltar Regiment, GR/6857.
- Major John Stuart Douglas McCrann, The Royal Logistic Corps, 543826.
- Major John Michael McMaster, Royal Army Medical Corps, Territorial Army, 534036.
- Lieutenant Colonel Robert Alfred McPherson, Royal Regiment of Artillery, 541373.
- Sergeant Paul Thomas Moody, Royal Regiment of Artillery, 25018092.
- Captain Paul Malcolm Nicholson, Corps of Royal Electrical and Mechanical Engineers, Territorial Army 566261.
- Lieutenant Colonel Julian John Olver, TD, Royal Army Medical Corps, Territorial Army, 497220.
- Major Neil John Painter, Corps of Royal Engineers, 498789.
- Captain Christopher Patrick Pawlowski, The Rifles, 556771.
- Captain Robert Alaric Peters, The Parachute Regiment, 24678649.
- Major Victoria Caroline Reid, The Royal Logistic Corps, 545442.
- Warrant Officer Class 1 Ian Stewart Richardson, Corps of Royal Electrical and Mechanical Engineers, 24497560.
- Captain Ian John Robinson, The Royal Anglian Regiment, 24707915.
- Major James Christopher Roddis, The Royal Regiment of Scotland, 541524.
- Warrant Officer Class 2 Neil Royston, The Rifles, 24841214.
- Lieutenant Colonel Nicholas John Rynn, The Yorkshire Regiment, 497503.
- Major Samantha Jayne Shepherd, Royal Regiment of Artillery, 547185.
- Major Richard Harris Sinclair, Scots Guards, 542777.
- Major Mark Railton Legh-Smith, Royal Regiment of Artillery, 537196.
- Warrant Officer Class 1 Nicholas James Smith, The Royal Logistic Corps, 24756741.
- Major David John Stubbington, Corps of Royal Electrical and Mechanical Engineers, 545399.
- Warrant Officer Class 2 Martyn William Thomson, Corps of Royal Electrical and Mechanical Engineers, 24725060.
- Major Matthew Charles Richard Thorp, The Royal Regiment of Fusiliers, 537218.
- Major Milan Torbica, TD, The London Regiment, Territorial Army, 543083.
- Lieutenant Colonel John Sydney Walker, The Queen's Royal Hussars, 547382.
- Major John Howell-Walmsley, Royal Corps of Signals, 550954.
- Captain Richard George Waygood, Life Guards, 553515.

Royal Air Force

- Sergeant Christopher Charles Almond (C8230203).
- Squadron Leader Shane William Anderson, DFC, (8701025A).
- Flight Lieutenant Paul Richard Barton (5204860C).
- Squadron Leader John Lee Chappell (5206383H).
- Squadron Leader Tara Alexandra McLuskie-Cunningham (8302766R).
- Warrant Officer Eileen Patricia Fearon (H8064854).
- Sergeant Douglas Mark Freeman (L8290396).
- Warrant Officer Graham Glynn (Q8172751).
- Corporal Julie Ann Gorman (A8311003).
- Warrant Officer Dennis Hawkins (S8127904).
- Wing Commander Piers Timothy Westcott Holland (8300578T).
- Master Aircrew Paul Douglas John Holmes, DFM, AFM. (H8260152).
- Sergeant Susan Margaret Jackson (Q8238533).
- Warrant Officer Stephen Anthony McMillan (F8020610).
- Flying Officer Stephen Paul New (0211531N), Royal Air Force Volunteer Reserve (Training).
- Corporal Martin James O'Hara (H8440365).
- Wing Commander David Christopher Tait (8300176H).

Civil Division

- Anna Elizabeth Adair. For voluntary service to Animal Welfare in North Wales.
- Wendy Adams. For services to People with Learning Disabilities in Lincolnshire.
- Dotun Adebayo, Broadcaster and Publisher. For services to the Arts.
- Jamila Aftab. For services to the community in St Paul's, Bristol.
- Ashuk Ahmed. For services to Young People.
- Isabel Aiken. For services to the community in Kendal, Cumbria.
- Adam Alexander, Senior Development Manager, Oaklee Housing Association Ltd. For services to Social Housing in Northern Ireland.
- Richard Thomas Allan. For voluntary service to the community in Kelso, Roxburgh.
- Dorothy Jane Allen, lately Head, Library and Heritage Services, Wandsworth Council. For services to Local Government in South West London.
- Patricia Allen. For voluntary service to Disabled People in Cumbria.
- Caroline Anne Anderson. For services to the Tourist Industry in the Forest of Dean and Wye Valley.
- Raymond Foster Anderson. For services to Business and to the community in Newcastle upon Tyne, Tyne and Wear.
- Tony Antoniou. For services to the community in the London Borough of Brent.
- Susan Ashby, Grade D, Ministry of Defence.
- Patricia Ann Astwood, Chair of Governors, Halifax High School, Calderdale, and Chair, Calderdale Association of School Governing Bodies. For voluntary service.
- Myrtle Augee, Senior Officer, HM Prison Pentonville, London, Ministry of Justice.
- Beryl Austin. For voluntary service to the community in Fort William, Highlands.
- Alice Avis, Chair, Sanctuary Spa Group. For services to the Beauty Industry.
- Captain Carl Bagwell, Harbour Master, Rye, East Sussex. For services to the Maritime Industry.
- Christopher Bailey, Creative Director, Burberry. For services to the Fashion Industry.
- Honor Lucie Bailey. For services to Heritage and to the community in Richmond-upon-Thames.
- Roger Baines. For voluntary service to the community in Preston, Lancashire.
- Dr Ian Martin Baker, Engineering Consultant, SELEX Galileo. For services to the Defence Industry.
- Rosina Matilde Giacopazzi Ballentine. For services to the community in Montrose, Angus.
- Robert James Balsdon. For services to the community in Reading, Berkshire.
- John Kenneth Banfield. For voluntary service to the RAF Ex-Prisoners of War Association.
- Jennifer Elizabeth Barker, lately School Secretary and Clerk to the Governors, Woolsery Village Primary School, Bideford, Devon. For services to Education.
- Peter Slade Bartlett, lately Chairman, South West Royal Yachting Association. For services to Sport.
- Trevor Halliwell Barton. For voluntary service to Sport in Wigan.
- Betty Bateson. For services to the community in Hatfield, Doncaster.
- Sheila Bearcroft. For services to Trade Unionism.
- Anne Baggot Beaumont. For services to the community in St. David's, Pembrokeshire.
- Henry Francis Beaumont. For services to the community in St. David's, Pembrokeshire.
- Denis Neil Beeston. For services to Local Government in Bestwood, Nottingham.
- Syeda Rowgi Begum. For services to Bengali and Somali People in Tower Hamlets, London.
- Mark Anthony Belamarich, Sea Survival and Safety Equipment Supervisor, Ministry of Defence.
- Brian Belcher, Former Chairman of Governors, The King John School, Essex. For voluntary service to Education.
- Barbara Muriel Bell, Classics Teacher, Clifton High School, Bristol. For services to local and national Education.
- Geoffrey Thomas Bell, Flood Risk Manager, Environment Agency. For services to the Water Industry.
- Barbara Helen Benfield. For services to the community in Alderney, Channel Islands.
- Andrew Bennett, Food and Beverage Manager, The Park Lane Hotel. For services to the Hospitality Industry and to Skills Training.
- Malcolm Berridge. For services to the community in Lowestoft, Suffolk.
- Joyce Beynon. For voluntary service to West Kirby Primary School, Wirral. For services to Education.
- Kuljit Bhamra. For services to Bhangra and British Asian Music.
- David Biddle, Deputy Chief Executive, Crime Reduction Initiatives. For services to Disadvantaged People in East Sussex.
- Brian William Birch, BEM. For voluntary service to Heritage in Derbyshire.
- Eric Campbell Black. For services to the community in Rhyl, Denbighshire.
- James Christopher Bolam, Actor. For services to Drama.
- Richard Christopher Cluley Bolsin, General Secretary, Workers' Educational Association. For services to Adult Education.
- Barbara Ann Bond, Pro-Chancellor, lately Chair of Board of Governors, University of Plymouth. For services to Higher Education.
- Mostapha Bouker, Deputy Race Equality Officer, Prison Officer, HM Prison Belmarsh, London, Ministry of Justice.
- Carolyn Bourton. For services to the community in Dorking, Surrey.
- Gillian Elaine Bowden (Mrs Core). For services to Mental Healthcare in Norfolk.
- Dawn Boyfield, Trustee, Parliamentary Advisory Council for Transport Safety. For services to Road Safety.
- Thomas Strahan Boyle, JP, Chairman, Acceptable Enterprises Larne Ltd. For services to Social Enterprise and to Disadvantaged People in Northern Ireland.
- William Amos Bratt, Chairman, Port Vale Football Club. For services to Sport.
- Helen Therese Bree, Administrative Officer, Offshore Safety Division, Health and Safety Executive, Department for Work and Pensions. For public and voluntary service.
- David Bridge. For services to Christian Aid in Scarborough.
- Mandy Bridge, Executive Officer, Jobcentre Plus, Department for Work and Pensions. For public and voluntary service.
- Robin David Bridgman, lately Assistant Headteacher, Hall Green School, Birmingham. For services to Education and to the community in the West Midlands.
- Jayne Ellison-Briggs, Senior Executive Officer, Jobcentre Plus, Department for Work and Pensions.
- Keith Broadbent. For public service in West Glamorgan.
- Veronica Broderick. For voluntary service to Animal Welfare in County Durham.
- Dawn Brooks, Treatment Manager, Hertfordshire Probation Area. For services to the Probation Service.
- Francis David Brooks, lately Chairman, Mercian Housing Association. For services to the community in the West Midlands.
- Joseph Roger Brown. For services to Music.
- Martin Granger Brown. For charitable services.
- Nigel Barton Brown, Police Constable, Nottinghamshire Police. For services to the Police.
- Selvin Brown, Deputy Head, Race Equality Diversity Division, Department for Communities and Local Government. For public and voluntary service.
- Stephen Aubrey Brown, Senior Officer, HM Prison and Young Offenders' Institution, Brinsford, Wolverhampton, Ministry of Justice.
- Derek Michael William Milliken Browne. For voluntary service to the community in Northern Ireland.
- Shirley Ann Bruce, lately Caretaker, Blessed William Howard Catholic High School, Stafford. For services to Education.
- Stewart Andrew Buchanan. For voluntary service to the Boys' Brigade in Northern Ireland.
- Elisabeth Buck, Play Group Manager, New Ark Adventure Playground, Peterborough. For services to Children and Families.
- Ronald James Bundock. For services to the community in Rhondda Cynon Taff.
- Professor Leslie Bunt, Founding Director, The MusicSpace Trust. For services to Music Therapy.
- David Albert Burgess, Chairman, Carers UK (Swansea Branch). For services to Disadvantaged People.
- Catherine Mary Burns, Head, Corporate Services, Northern Ireland Transport Holding Company. For services to Public Transport and to the community in Northern Ireland.
- Bernice Virginia Augustine Burton, lately Specialist Counsellor, Sickle Cell and Thalassaemia Service, Newham Health Service and Primary Care Trust. For services to the NHS in East London.
- Robert Burton, lately Executive Officer, Child Support Agency, Department for Work and Pensions. For public and voluntary service.
- Jonathan Butterworth, Director, UK Operations, National Grid. For services to the Gas Industry.
- Liam Byrne. For voluntary service to Downpatrick Catholic Scout Group, Northern Ireland.
- Frank Edward Caddy. For services to Community Transport in Northern Ireland.
- Dr Ian Wallace Campbell, General Medical Practitioner and Obesity Specialist, Nottingham. For services to Healthcare.
- Margaret Campbell. For voluntary service to the Historic Environment of Assynt, North West Highlands of Scotland.
- Sheila Campbell, Regional Manager, Visitor Services South of Scotland. For services to the Tourist Industry.
- Gemma Cartwright. For services to the community in Longbridge, Birmingham.
- Meryl Castanha, Office Manager and Diary Secretary, HM Treasury. For public and voluntary service.
- Gabriel Chanan. For services to Community Development.
- Christine Anne Chapman, lately Project Manager, Action for Children Rowans Support Project, Milton Keynes. For services to Children and Families.
- Edward Douglas Chapman. For services to Light Entertainment and to Charity.
- Anthony Hugh Chignell, lately Hospitaller, The St John of Jerusalem Eye Hospital. For services to Ophthalmology.
- Agnes McPhee Graham Chisholm. For voluntary service to Ladies' Golf.
- Colin Dale Chitty, Managing Director, Cobham Flight Inspection Ltd. For services to the Aviation Industry.
- Victor Emanuel Christopher, Training Manager, Ministry of Defence. For public and voluntary service.
- Lisa Clark, Customer Services Manager, East Anglia Group, Valuation Office Agency, HM Revenue and Customs. For public and voluntary service.
- Daphne Elizabeth Clarke. For services to the community in Northern Ireland.
- David Alan Clarke. For voluntary service to Sir Graham Balfour School, Stafford.
- Sally Vanessa Clarke, Chef and Restaurateur, Clarke's. For services to the Hospitality Industry.
- Esther Coghlan. For services to Save the Children in Northern Ireland.
- Deborah Cohen, Editor, BBC Radio Science. For services to Broadcasting and to Science.
- Elizabeth Cole. For services to the community in Deal and Walmer, Kent.
- Andrea Margaret Collingridge, Maternity Social Worker, Leicestershire County Council. For services to Local Government.
- John Collins. For services to Basketball.
- John Connor, lately Gardener, Altnagelvin Area Hospital, Londonderry. For services to Healthcare in Northern Ireland.
- Marie Ann Connors, Customer Care Manager, Companies House, Department for Business, Enterprise and Regulatory Reform. For public and voluntary service.
- Ann Violet Conway, School Crossing Warden, Solihull Council. For services to Education.
- George Leonard Cooke, Chairman, Middlesbrough Football Club in the Community. For services to Sport.
- Tania Cooper, Managing Director, Alexander Technologies Europe Ltd. For services to International Trade and to Business in the North East.
- Rosemary Ann Coote. For services to Disadvantaged Children in Romania.
- Doreen Corcoran. For voluntary service to Heritage in Northern Ireland.
- Maria Costello. For services to Motorcycling.
- Beverley Lorraine Cousins, Group Support Manager, Customer Operations South Wales, HM Revenue and Customs. For public and voluntary service.
- Cynthia Cowley, Caretaker and Lunchtime Supervisor, St. James and St. John Church of England School, Akeley, Buckinghamshire. For services to Education.
- David Graham Cox. For services to the community in the South Wirral.
- Group Captain Edward Reginald Cox, Director, The Air League. For services to the Aviation Industry.
- George Arthur Cox. For services to the community in Sedgley, West Midlands.
- Nicola Ann Cox, Founder and Editor, First News. For services to Children.
- Lynne Coy, lately Teacher, Yewlands School, Sheffield. For services to Education.
- Laura Crawford. For services to the Voluntary Sector and to Disabled People in Wales.
- Philip Edmund Crawley. For services to the Burma Star Association.
- Alberto Crisci, Catering Services Manager, HM Prison High Down, Sutton, Surrey. For services to the Catering Industry.
- Christine Cronogue. For voluntary service to New Parks Estate, Leicester.
- John Cross, Non-Executive Director, Departmental Board, Department for Work and Pensions. For public service.
- Pamela Jean Cruise, Senior Officer, Stamp Taxes, Worthing, HM Revenue and Customs.
- Brian Curtis. For voluntary service to Disadvantaged People in Jersey.
- Aideen Carmel D'Arcy, Director of Development, Helm Housing. For services to Disadvantaged People in Northern Ireland.
- Christine Dale, Childminder, Stockport, Cheshire. For services to Children and Families.
- Judith Mary Dalgarno, Leader, Stafford Borough Council. For services to the Local Government and to the community in Stafford.
- Norma Jean Darter. For charitable services in Walton-on-the Hill, Surrey.
- Dr. Shobha Das, Deputy Director, Support Against Racist Incidents. For services to Community Relations in Bristol.
- Laurence Charles Davidson, lately Development Manager, Devon Partnership NHS Trust. For services to Mental Healthcare.
- Brenda Teresa Davies. For services to the community in Erewash, Nottinghamshire.
- Joan Florence Rocliffe Davies. For services to the community in Staffordshire.
- Malcolm Derek Davies. Foster Carer, Shropshire. For services to Children and Families.
- Patricia Jean Davies, Foster Carer, Shropshire. For services to Children and Families.
- Peter Wilton Davies, DL. For services to the community in Cornwall.
- Dr Terence Rees Davies, Medical Director, Carmarthenshire Local Health Board. For services to Medicine and to the NHS in Wales.
- William Davis. For voluntary service to Youth Justice in Nottingham.
- Natalia Dawkins. For services to Vulnerable Women in London.
- Vanda Maureen Dawson. For services to the community in Craven Arms, Shropshire.
- Florence Ann Max De Boo. For services to Science Education and to the community in North London.
- Dr Michael Anthony de Podesta, Research Scientist, National Physical Laboratory. For services to Science.
- Marcelle Elizabeth De Sousa, Nurse Specialist, Adolescent Unit, University College Hospitals NHS Foundation Trust. For services to Healthcare.
- Janet Dean, School Crossing Warden, Heswell Primary School, Wirral. For services to Education.
- Clare Brabner Delpech, Founder, Association for Post Natal Illness. For services to Mental Healthcare.
- Kamwarjit Singh Dhillon, Forensic Operations Manager, Bedfordshire Police. For services to the Police.
- Gillian Mary Dibden. For services to Youth Choral Music in Berkshire.
- Felicity Mary Dick. For voluntary service to Asylum Seekers.
- Zoe Dixon, Grade 7, Shared Services Directorate, Department for Work and Pensions. For public and voluntary service.
- Dr Penelope Dobson, lately Director of Education and Resources for Improving Childhood Continence. For services to Healthcare.
- William Thomas Docherty. For services to the community in the North West.
- Bridget Dollard. For services to the community in Yeovil, Somerset.
- Gillian Marie Donnell, Chief Superintendent, Dorset Police. For services to the Police.
- Professor Raymund John Donnelly, Founder and President, Roy Castle Lung Cancer Foundation. For voluntary service to Healthcare.
- Theodore Dorel. For services to Local Government and to the community in Monmouthshire.
- Francis Dornan, Manager, Cloona Oasis Centre, Belfast. For services to the community in Northern Ireland.
- The Reverend Dr. Fiona Carol Douglas, Chaplain, University of Dundee. For services to Higher Education.
- Keren Down, Director, Foundation for Assistive Technology. For services to Older and Disabled People.
- Caroline Drummond. For services to the Agriculture Industry.
- Paul Edward Du Feu. For voluntary service to Swimming in Jersey.
- Michael Duckett, Catering Manager, Royal Brompton Hospital. For services to the NHS.
- Maurice Duckworth, Special Inspector, Lancashire Constabulary. For voluntary service to the Police.
- John William Duffill, District Manager, Jobcentre Plus, Department for Work and Pensions.
- Virginia Duncanson. For services to the Farming Industry and to Conservation in Kent.
- Ann Echlin. For services to the community in North Kent.
- Joyce Edgar. For voluntary service to Children and Families in the Wirral.
- Charlotte Edwards, Captain, England Women's Cricket Team. For services to Sport.
- Michael Reginald Elmes, Duke of Edinburgh Award Leader, St. Bernard's High School and Arts College, Westcliff-on-Sea, Essex. For services to Young People.
- Gail Elizabeth Emms. For services to Badminton.
- Robert Erskine, Coxswain, Royal National Lifeboat Institution, Portpatrick, Stranraer. For voluntary service to Maritime Safety.
- Professor Edward Parry Evans. For services to Environmental Science.
- Linda Mariane Evans. For services to the Metal Finishing Industry in the West Midlands.
- Mark Singleton Evans. For services to the community in Scarborough, North Yorkshire.
- Michael Rowland Evans. For services to the community in Farnborough, Hampshire.
- Penelope Ann Evans. For services to the community in the Vale of Glamorgan.
- Philip Steven Evans, Head of Information Communication Technology, Caerphilly County Borough Council. For services to Local Government.
- Roger Evans, Plant Director, Schaeffer (UK) Ltd, Llanelli. For services to the Engineering Industry in Wales.
- Bernardine Evaristo, Author. For services to Literature.
- Mary Brigid Everett. For services to the community in Ushaw Moor, County Durham.
- David Wyn Cole Eynon, Head of 14-19 Development, Caerphilly County Borough Council. For services to Education in Wales.
- Barbara Farndon, Higher Executive Officer, Pension, Disability and Carers' Service, Department for Work and Pensions. For public and voluntary service.
- Geoffrey Richard Dudley Farr, DL. For services to the community in Luton, Bedfordshire.
- Diana Farrelly, Lifelong Learning Manager, Armagh Campus, Southern Regional College. For services to Further Education in Northern Ireland.
- Victor Alan Faulkner. For services to People with Special Needs in Amersham, Buckinghamshire.
- Henry Ferguson. For voluntary service to Football and to the Seagull Trust in Edinburgh.
- Dennis Michael Field. For services to Heraldic Art.
- Michael Fielding. For services to the community in Huyton, Merseyside.
- Ernie Finch. For public service.
- Gareth Fitzpatrick, Director of the Living Landscape Trust and Chief Executive, Heritage Education Trust. For services to Heritage.
- Sandra Fitzpatrick, Head, Children, Young People and Families, Sandwell Primary Care Trust. For services to Healthcare.
- Dudley Fletcher. For voluntary service to Rowing in Doncaster.
- John Forbes, Foster Carer, Leeds. For services to Children and Families.
- Shelagh Margaret Forbes, Officer, Customer Operations, Tyne and Wear, HM Revenue and Customs. For public and voluntary service.
- Stephanie Forbes, Foster Carer, Leeds. For services to Children and Families.
- Evelyn Ellen Ford. For voluntary service to the Royal National Lifeboat Institution, Berkhamsted, Hertfordshire.
- Lillian Eileen Forster. For voluntary service to Edgewood Primary School, Hucknall, Nottinghamshire.
- Fay Rosemary Foster. For services to the community in Haslemere, Surrey.
- Petronelle Fowler-Watts, Matron Manager, Lister House. For services to the Royal British Legion.
- Anthony Fox, Prison Officer, New Hall, Wakefield, Ministry of Justice. For public and voluntary service.
- John Noble Franks. For services to Disabled People in Northampton.
- Sheila Franks, Foster Carer, Hertfordshire. For services to Children and Families.
- Roy Freer. For services to the community in Dunnington, York.
- Kamini Gadhok, Chief Executive and Professional Director, Royal College of Speech and Language Therapists. For services to the Allied Health Professions.
- Dr Roger Gadsby, General Medical Practitioner, Nuneaton. For services to Diabetes Care and to the NHS.
- Patricia Gale, North East Regional Programme Leader, Together for Children. For services to Children and Young People.
- John Patrick Gallienne. For voluntary service to the Royal Hospital Chelsea and to the communities in Guernsey and Sark.
- Kathryn Susan Galvin, Adoption Contact Co-ordinator, Devon County Council. For services to Children and Families.
- Nina Rajarani Ganguly. For services to South Asian Dance.
- Olive Mary Gardiner. For services to the Accountancy Profession in Scotland.
- Dennis Garner. For services to the Environment and to the local community in the East Riding of Yorkshire.
- Fiona Gasper, Executive Producer, Liverpool Culture Company. For services to the Arts.
- Maria Georgiou. For voluntary service to Neighbourhood Watch, Castle Point District and The Weald, Canvey Island, Essex.
- Colin Gibson. For public service.
- Hilary Gibson, Administrative Officer, Child Support Agency, Department for Work and Pensions. For public and voluntary service.
- Susan Fiona Gilroy. For services to Table Tennis.
- The Honourable Richard Thomas Godber, DL. For services to Agriculture and to Young People in Buckinghamshire.
- Janice Mary Godfrey. For services to Young People and to the community in Wayland, Norfolk.
- Thomas Gondris. For voluntary service to Conservation and Heritage in Suffolk.
- Doris Goode. For services to the community in North East Warwickshire.
- Violet Donna Gostling. For services to the community in Waltham Forest, East London.
- Samuel George Gracey, Station Watch Commander, Dromore Northern Ireland Fire and Rescue Service. For services to Local Government.
- William James Graham, lately Medical Engineering Technician, North East Ambulance Service NHS Trust. For services to Healthcare.
- John Grant, Patent Attorney. For services to Intellectual Property.
- Joseph Grant, lately General-Secretary, Scottish Police Federation. For services to the Police.
- Edith Wendy Gray, Director, Centre for Youth and Community Development, Luton. For services to Young People.
- Ian Stuart Gray, Policy Officer, Chartered Institute of Environmental Health. For services to Public Health.
- Professor Robert Hugh Gray, Professor of Social and Environmental Accounting, University of St Andrews. For services to the Accountancy Profession.
- Eric Alwyn Green. For voluntary service to the Air Training Corps in Durham and Northumberland.
- Raymond Edwin Green. For voluntary service to Sport and to Education in Wolverhampton, West Midlands.
- John Richard Greenwood. For services to the community in Balcombe, West Sussex.
- Dr Anthony Wayne Griffiths. For voluntary service to Welsh Culture and to Sport in Carmarthenshire.
- Brenda Grixti, Manager, Benchill Community Centre, Wythenshawe, Manchester. For services to Children and Families.
- Tony Gumbleton, Inspector, Metropolitan Police Service. For services to the Police.
- Michael Brian Gurney, Chairman of Governors, Torquay Community College, Torbay. For voluntary service to Education.
- Ian Charles Gurr. For services to the Loch Lomond Highland Games and to the community in Balloch, Dunbartonshire.
- Melissa Joanne Hackney, Press Office Manager, Merseyside Police. For services to the Police.
- Rosalind Eleanor Jane Hall. For voluntary service to the RAF and Dependants' Disabled Holiday Trust.
- John Louis Halls. For services to the community in Walton-on-the-Naze, Essex.
- Elizabeth Hamilton. For voluntary service to Older People in Ballygowan, County Down.
- Barbara Trevorrow Hamnett, lately Principal Deputy Headteacher, JFS School, Brent, London. For services to Education.
- Betty Hampson. For voluntary service to Older People in Clophill, Bedfordshire.
- Maurice Hancock. For voluntary service to the Treherbert Boys' and Girls' Club, South Wales.
- Douglas Lawson Hands, Chairman of Governors, Lewisham College, London. For voluntary service to Further Education.
- Councillor Ahmadul Haque, Chairman, Al Islah Community Trust. For services to the community in Sandwell, West Midlands.
- Dr David John Hardman, Managing Director, Aston Science Park. For services to Science.
- Philip James Hargreaves. For voluntary service to People with Autism in Lancashire.
- Ruth Harman. For voluntary service to Heritage Conservation in Sheffield.
- Ann Lucy Mary Harpwood. For voluntary service to Justice for Dogs Charity.
- Anthony Harrington. For services to the community in Bournemouth.
- Anne Mary Ida Harris. For services to the community in Stourbridge, West Midlands.
- Esmond Havelock Melville Harris. For services to Forestry and to Conservation in the South West.
- Dale Harrison. For services to the community in North and West Belfast.
- Hilda Stephanie Harvey, Chair, Bury Primary Care Trust. For services to the NHS and to the community in Greater Manchester.
- Theodora Haskins. For voluntary service to the community in North Wales.
- Henry William Hawkes. For services to Conservation in Warwickshire.
- Elaine Hay. For services to the Children's Hearings System in Stirling.
- Stuart Leask Hay, Deputy Headteacher, Anderson High School, Shetland. For services to local and international Education.
- Eileen Margaret Hayes. For services to Children and Families.
- Paul Heathcote, Restaurateur. For services to the Hospitality Industry in the North West.
- John Hefin. For services to Welsh Film and Drama.
- John Francis Henderson. For services to the community in Rushbury, Shropshire.
- Gordon Henshall. For voluntary service to the Scouts in Essex.
- Raymond Leonard Herbert. For services to the community in North Wales.
- Phyllis Herriot. For services to the community in Edinburgh.
- Roy Alphanso Hewitt. For services to the community in Sandwell, West Midlands.
- George Lockhart Hibberd. For services to the Earl Mountbatten Hospice, Isle of Wight.
- Curline Hibbert, Home Care Assistant, Westminster City Council. For services to Local Government in London.
- Graeme Ashley Hick, lately Cricketer. For services to Sport.
- Stephen Hillier. For services to Ballroom Dancing.
- Maurice Hilton. For services to Young People in Shevington, Wigan.
- Guy Jonathan Hirst, Caseworker and Welsh Language Co-ordinator, Valuation Office Agency Wales, HM Revenue and Customs.
- Timothy William Hockenhull, Grade B2, Ministry of Defence.
- John Hodgson. For services to the Probation Service in Cumbria.
- Phillip Hodgson, Inspector, Cheshire Police. For services to the Police.
- Richard Michael Holdsworth, Heritage Director, Chatham Historic Dockyard Trust. For services to Heritage in Kent.
- Olivia Mary Holmes. For voluntary service to Brunswick Park School, Southwark, London.
- Richard Taylor Holmes. For services to the community in Northern Ireland and Romania.
- Colin Holt. For services to the community in Lytham-St-Annes, Lancashire.
- Janette Irene Holt. For voluntary service to Young People and to the Cleveland Ironstone Mining Museum, North Yorkshire.
- Iris May Horn, Station Master, Stogumber Railway Station. For voluntary service to the Rail Industry in Somerset.
- Lieutenant Commander Reginald John Horner. For voluntary service to the Sea Cadet Corps in Huddersfield.
- Brian Thomas Houssart. For charitable services.
- Helen Somerset How. For services to the Rainbow Centre for Conductive Education in Fareham, Hampshire.
- Commander David Allen Howard. For voluntary service to Older People in Lansdown, Bath.
- John Christopher Howard. For services to the community in Edenthorpe, Doncaster.
- Susan Catherine Howard. For services to Nature Conservation in South Wales.
- Elizabeth Howcroft. For charitable services in Swansea.
- Susan Howley, Chair of Governors, Fairfield Park School, Stotfold and Greenleas Lower School, Leighton Buzzard, Bedfordshire. For voluntary service to Education.
- Cicely Anne Llewellyn Hughes. For voluntary service to the Royal National Lifeboat Institution, Pontypool.
- Elizabeth Hughes, lately School Secretary, Beechfield Infant School, Somerset. For services to Education.
- Glyn Hughes, Musical Director, Brymbo Male Choir. For services to Music and to Charity in North Wales.
- Janice Marilyn Hughes, lately Nurse Practitioner, North West Wales NHS Trust. For services to Healthcare.
- John Henry Hughes. For services to Local Government and to the community in Powys.
- Rosa Hui, DL, Director, Bristol and Avon Chinese Women's Group. For services to the Chinese community in Bristol and South Gloucestershire.
- Gareth Humphreys. For voluntary service to Lawn Bowls.
- Sheila Humphreys. For services to the Longshaw Sheep Dog Trials Association, Derbyshire.
- Christopher Hurst, For voluntary service to the Royal National Lifeboat Institution, Fleetwood, Lancashire.
- Henry Edward George Hurt. For services to the Knitting Industry in Nottinghamshire.
- Iftakhar Hussain. For services to Asian People in Hartlepool, County Durham.
- Dr. Brian Irvine. For services to Music in Northern Ireland.
- Nurul Islam. For services to Bengali People.
- Brian David Jackson. For voluntary service to Muscular Dystrophy Charities.
- Ronald James. For voluntary service to Mountaineering.
- Michael Jarrett, Children's Centres County Manager, Shropshire County Council. For services to Local Government.
- Elizabeth Jefferies. For services to the community in Everton, Nottinghamshire.
- Mercy Jeyasingham, Non-Executive Director, National Institute for Health and Clinical Excellence. For services to Healthcare.
- Gareth John, Chairman, Federation of Disability Sports Wales. For voluntary service to Sport.
- Maureen Harriett Johnston. For public service.
- Clare Jean Lewis-Jones, Chief Executive, Infertility Network UK. For services to Healthcare.
- James Jones. For services to the community in Bourne, Lincolnshire.
- James Albert Claude Jones, lately Chairman, Gorlestone Football and Social Club. For services to Sport in Great Yarmouth.
- Dr Mohga Kamal-Yanni. For services to Oxfam.
- Maxine Kasicki. For voluntary service to Victim Support, West Suffolk.
- Xenophon Kelsey. For services to Music.
- Robert James Kennett, lately Chief Inspector, Kent Police. For services to the Police.
- Thomas Frederick Kerr. For services to the Arts in Northern Ireland.
- Ebrahim Kharodia. For services to Pharmacy in Central London and to Charity in Malawi.
- Malkit Kharpal, Grade C2, Ministry of Defence.
- Brenda Mary King, Tissue Viability Nurse Specialist, Sheffield Primary Care Trust. For services to Healthcare.
- Jacqueline Olivia King. For services to People with Eating Disorders in Northern Ireland.
- Lee Francis Kirkham, Senior Executive Officer, Strategy, Information and Pensions Directorate, Department for Work and Pensions. For public and voluntary service.
- Dr. Mary Helen Elizabeth Kirkpatrick, General Medical Practitioner, Dromara. For services to Healthcare in Northern Ireland.
- Christina Audrey Ruth Patric Kitchen. For services to Oxfam, Epsom.
- Donald Henry Kitt. For voluntary service to Ipswich Holiday Help for Children.
- Colin Richard Kneller. For services to Law Enforcement.
- Professor John Knibbs, lately Vice-Chairman, Northamptonshire Healthcare NHS Trust. For services to Healthcare.
- Jean Knox, Secretary, Brownlow High School, Craigavon. For services to Education in Northern Ireland.
- Geoffrey Charles Knupfer, Chief Officer, Durham Special Constabulary. For services to the Police.
- Danny Lafayette, Knife Crime Policy Adviser and Chairman, The Network, Home Office.
- Elizabeth Lambert, Senior Personal Assistant, Prime Minister's Office, Cabinet Office.
- Richard John Laslett. For voluntary service to Sport and to Young People in the communities of Canterbury and Eastry in Kent.
- Frances Lawrence. For charitable services to the Philip Lawrence Awards.
- Pamela Lawrence, lately Chief Executive, The Edward Lloyd Trust. For services to People with Learning Disabilities.
- Margaret Laybourn, Operations Manager, Personal Tax, County Durham, HM Revenue and Customs.
- Dr. Minh Son Le, Technology Development Manager, United Utilities. For services to the Water Industry.
- Peter Le Beau, JP, Managing Director, Le Beau Visage. For services to the Insurance Industry and to Charity.
- Stewart Leach, lately Principal Officer, HM Prison Service, London, Ministry of Justice.
- Peter Legg. For services to Vocational Education and to Skills Training.
- Audrey Helene Leonard, Chair, Whaley Bridge Branch, Royal National Lifeboat Institution, Derbyshire. For voluntary service to Maritime Safety.
- Nyree Elise Lewis, Swimmer. For services to Disability Sport.
- Paul Anthony Liburd. For services to Dance.
- Lieutenant Colonel Julian Gordon Linington, TD, Chairman, Connaught Drill Halls Trust. For voluntary service to the Reserve Forces and Cadets in the South East.
- Trudie Caroline Anne Lobban, Founder and Chief Executive, Syncope Trust and Reflex Anoxic Seizures Charity. For services to Healthcare.
- Rachel Tanya Lowe, Managing Director, RTL Games. For services to Business.
- David Trevor Luney, Grade C1, Ministry of Defence.
- Dr Roy Lurvey. For services to the community in Torfaen, South Wales.
- John David Richard Lyon. For services to the Armed Forces.
- Euan James Stuart MacDonald. For services to People with Motor Neurone Disease in Scotland.
- Frazer Andrew Macdonald, Watch Manager, Tayside Fire and Rescue. For services to the Prince's Trust.
- Carol MacGruer, Study Co-ordinator, Ayr Centre College. For services to Further Education and to the community in Ayrshire.
- Christine MacKechnie. For services to the Children's Hearings System in Scotland.
- Robert MacLeod, Managing Director, Assessment North East. For services to Investors in People and to International Trade.
- Anne MacNeary, Chair of Governors, Keyworth Primary School and Chair, Interim Executive Board, Geoffrey Chaucer Technology College, Southwark, London. For voluntary service to Education.
- Hamish MacPhee, Principal Educational Psychologist, Fife Council. For services to Children and Families.
- Lorraine Mary MacPherson. For services to the community in Boat of Garten, Inverness-shire.
- Monica Lee-MacPherson. For services to Chinese People in the Scottish Highlands and Moray.
- Paul Maley. For services to the community in the West Midlands.
- Jane Elizabeth Mallinson, Life President, Tamworth Nursery, Staffordshire. For services to Special Needs Education.
- Violet Olive Marriott. For services to Theatre Administration.
- Barbara Marshallsay, Assistant Director, North East Lincolnshire Care Trust Plus. For services to Social Care.
- Carolyn Sarah Martin. For voluntary service to Victim Support and Witness Care in Winchester.
- David Martin, Head of Planning, Operational Services, Metropolitan Police Service. For services to the Police.
- Patrick Martin. For voluntary service to the Citizens' Advice Bureau and to the community in Coatbridge, Lanarkshire.
- Robert John Harry Martin. For services to Life-Saving.
- Dr Kathryn Elizabeth Mashiter, Scientific Support Manager, Lancashire Constabulary. For services to the Police.
- Natalie Sara Massenet, Founder and Chair, Net-A-Porter.com. For services to the Fashion Industry.
- Graham Masterman, Grade C2, Ministry of Defence.
- Susan Mathews, Curator, Stained Glass Museum. For services to the Visual Arts.
- John Maw. For voluntary service to Higher Education and to the community in York.
- Annie Elizabeth Esme Maxwell, Information Desk Assistant, Belfast International Airport. For services to the Aviation Industry and to Charity.
- Martin Mayers. For services to the Probation Service in Greater Manchester.
- Vincent McAllister. For services to Disadvantaged Young People.
- Archibald McAvoy, Director, Abbey Bond Lovis. For services to Health and Safety in Northern Ireland.
- Anne-Marie McClure, Chief Executive, Opportunity Youth. For services to Young People in Northern Ireland.
- Claire McColgan, Executive Producer, Liverpool Culture Company. For services to the Arts.
- Dorothy Anne McConnell. For voluntary service to Disabled People in Essex.
- Alison Patricia McCullough. For services to Speech and Language Therapy in Northern Ireland.
- Barrie Duncan McGill. For voluntary service to the Royal National Lifeboat Institution, Abersoch, Lleyn Peninsula.
- Bernard McGill. For services to Lifelong Learning and to Trade Unions in the North East.
- Ellie McKay, Alderman and Councillor, North Down Borough Council. For services to Local Government in Northern Ireland.
- Milton Emmanuel McKenzie. For services to Trade Unionism and to Diversity and Equal Opportunities in Barking and Dagenham.
- Eileen Elizabeth McKiernan, Chair, Meningitis Association Scotland. For voluntary service to Healthcare.
- Maureen McLaughlin, Operations Director, Diamond Corrugated Cases. For services to Women's Enterprise in Northern Ireland.
- Linda Jane McLuckie, Executive Officer, Jobcentre Plus, Department for Work and Pensions. For public and voluntary service.
- Mary Colette McMenamin, Front-Line Manager, Customer Operations, Merseyside, HM Revenue and Customs. For public and voluntary service.
- Sandra McMillan, Manager, Chulmleigh Business and Enterprise Centre, North Devon. For services to Adult Education.
- Robert Stewart McMinn, lately Director, Technical Services Dungannon and South Tyrone Borough Council. For services to Local Government in Northern Ireland.
- Bridget McNally. For charitable services to Cancer Research UK.
- Neil McNally, Instructional Officer, HM Prison Frankland, County Durham, Ministry of Justice.
- Keith Meakin. For services to the British Limbless Ex-Service Men's Association.
- Robert Walter Meldrum, HM Principal Inspector, Health and Safety Executive, Department for Work and Pensions. For public and voluntary service.
- Ronald Clunie Melville, Regional Director for London, Forestry Commission. For public and voluntary service.
- Matsie Meneely. For charitable services to Cancer Research UK in Northern Ireland.
- Jean Michie. For services to Older People and to the community in Glasgow.
- John Reginald George Miles. For voluntary service to Cancer Charities in Bristol.
- David Antony Miller. For services to Horticulture in Guernsey.
- Theresa Moira Miller. For services to Health and Safety in the Printing Industry.
- Alan Milliner, Constable, Devon and Cornwall Constabulary. For services to the Police.
- John Mills. For services to Christian Aid in Monmouthshire.
- Frank Millsopp, General Manager, Community Opportunities for Participation in Enterprise. For services to Social Enterprise.
- Safia Laila Minney, Founder and Director, People Tree. For services to Fair Trade and to the Fashion Industry.
- Gillian Barbara Mitchell. For voluntary service to Simpson's Special Care Babies' Charity, Edinburgh.
- Mary Buller Vint Mitchell. For charitable services in Bellshill, Glasgow.
- Leslie Michael John Mitton. For services to the community in Nottingham.
- David Douglas Moar. For voluntary service to Cancer Charities in Norfolk and North Suffolk.
- Ivor Woodhouse Moon, JP. For voluntary service to Adult Education and to the community in the East Midlands.
- Raymond John Kentigern Moore. For voluntary service to the Soldiers', Sailors' and Airmen's Families Association in Inverness-shire.
- Deane Wieland Morrice. For services to Local Government in Northern Ireland.
- Malcolm Brian Moss, Retained Leading Firefighter, Leicestershire and Rutland Fire and Rescue Service. For services to Local Government.
- David Stephen Moulson. For voluntary service to Heritage in Alcester, Warwickshire.
- William Tulloch Muir. For services to the community in North Ronaldsay, Orkney.
- William Mulholland. For public service.
- Jill Patricia Muncey, lately Chartered Physiotherapist, Whipps Cross University Hospital NHS Trust. For services to the Allied Health Professions.
- Pamela Gwyn Munro. For voluntary service to Headway, Tunbridge Wells and District.
- Rosemary Murray. For services to Disabled Children and Young People in Northern Ireland.
- Robin Myers, Archivist Emeritus, Worshipful Company of Stationers and Newspaper Makers. For services to Bibliography and Book History.
- Graham Timothy Naughton, lately Detective Constable, British Transport Police. For services to the Police.
- Javaid Naveed. For services to Black and Minority Ethnic People in Northern Ireland.
- Oswald Newell. For voluntary service to Nottingham Stroke Services Partnership Action Group.
- Frank Newhouse. For voluntary service to the Arnhem Veterans' Club.
- Susan Nicholas. For voluntary service to the Independent Monitoring Board, HM Young Offenders' Institution, Onley, Barby, Northamptonshire and to the National Council.
- Andrew Nixon. For services to the community in Daventry, Northamptonshire.
- Robert Ross Noble. For services to the community in the Scottish Highlands.
- Keda Norman. For services to Young People in Hexham, Northumberland.
- Barbara Rose O'Hanlon. For services to Business in the Isle of Man.
- James Desmond O'Mahony. For voluntary service to the Air Training Corps in Cheshire.
- Sally Mary Olohan, Head of Student Support Services, Nottingham Trent University. For services to Higher Education.
- Colin Sidney Osborne, Trustee, Orchid Cancer Appeal. For services to Healthcare.
- Philip Barnes Park, Regional Manager, Youth Justice Board. For services to Young People in the North West.
- Charles John Parker. For services to the community in Gosforth, Newcastle upon Tyne.
- Mary Catherine Parry. For services to the Performing Arts and to Charity in North Wales.
- Lopa Patel, Founder, Redhotcurry.com. For services to the Creative Industries.
- Pravina Patel. For voluntary service to Victim Support and Witness Care in London.
- Urvashi Patel, Senior Executive Officer, Adult Basic Skills Strategy Unit, Department for Innovation, Universities and Skills. For public and voluntary service.
- George Patience. For voluntary service to the Algerines Association.
- Ann Mursell Pattinson. For services to the Meirionydd Special Riding Group and to Disabled People in Gwynedd.
- David Martin Patton, Chairman, Patton Group. For services to the Construction Industry in Northern Ireland.
- Marilyn Sandra Payne. For voluntary service to Skaterham Community Centre, Caterham-on-the-Hill, Surrey.
- Dr David John Paynton, Managing Director, Commercial Services, Southampton City Primary Care Trust. For services to Healthcare.
- David Peacock. For voluntary service to Whickham Community Garden, Tyne and Wear.
- Keith David Pearce, Detective Superintendent, Metropolitan Police Service. For services to the Police.
- Madeleine Pearce. For voluntary service to the St. John Ambulance Brigade in Hertfordshire.
- Richard Job Pearce. For services to Disadvantaged People in Bristol.
- Sandra Margaret Pell, Chair, Suffolk Waste Management Group. For services to Local Government.
- Graham Pennington, Principal Officer, HM Prison Manchester, Ministry of Justice.
- Sheila Perks. For voluntary service to Netball.
- Craig Dearden-Phillips, Founder and Chief Executive, Speaking Up Charity. For services to Social Enterprise.
- Sheila Phoenix, Telephony and Systems Administrator, Peterlee Contact Centre, HM Revenue and Customs. For public and voluntary service.
- The Rev Dr Hugh Rayment-Pickard. For service to the community in the Royal Borough of Kensington and Chelsea.
- Daniele Piermattei. For services to the community in Stannington, Sheffield.
- Michael James Piggott, Head of Enforcement Policy, Department for Environment, Food and Rural Affairs. For public and voluntary service.
- John Reginald Powell, Head of Department, Music and Performing Arts, Davenant Foundation School, Loughton, Essex. For services to Education.
- Susanne Ruth Powlesland. For voluntary service to Black and Minority Ethnic People in East London.
- Philip Charles Price. For voluntary service to the community in Northern Ireland.
- Robert Edward Price. For voluntary service to the Plumbing and Heating Industry and to the community in Great Yarmouth, Norfolk.
- Russell Profitt. For services to the community in Southwark, London.
- Christopher John Thomas Quallington. For services to Heritage and to the community in Shropshire.
- Agnes Joan Radcliffe. For voluntary service to the St. John Ambulance Brigade and to the community in the Isle of Man.
- James Leonard Rainey, Deputy Principal, ICT and Innovation Branch, Department for Employment and Learning, Northern Ireland Executive.
- Susan Ralph. For services to the community in Oldbury, West Midlands.
- Patricia Agnes Ramage. For voluntary service to Girlguiding in South Lanarkshire.
- Lysbeth Ann Graham Ramsay, School Crossing Warden. For services to the community in Uplawmoor, East Renfrewshire.
- Grace Lilian Randell, Chair of Governors, Valley Park Community School, Sheffield. For voluntary service to Education.
- David Vernon Read. For services to Brass Band Music.
- William Reed. For services to the community in Lyme Regis, Dorset.
- Joanne Rees, Head of Customer Service, Department of Health.
- Nesta Rees, lately Director of Nursing, Flintshire Local Health Board. For services to the NHS in Wales.
- Michael Arthur Ferard Reeve. For charitable services.
- Gordon Desmond Reilly, District Manager, Northern Ireland Housing Executive. For services to Social Housing.
- Joseph Reilly, Director and General Manager, Warship Support and Port and Property Services, Babcock Marine. For services to the Ship Repair Industry.
- Maureen Dorothy Ann Reynel. For voluntary service through Families in Need, Ipswich, Suffolk.
- Jennifer Reynolds, lately Deputy Headteacher, Douglas Bader Centre Pupil Referral Unit, Norfolk. For services to Education.
- Peter John Richards, lately Headteacher, St. Joseph's Cathedral Primary School, Swansea. For services to Education in Wales.
- Peter Ricketts, Chairman, Neath and Tennant Canals Trust. For services to Heritage Conservation in Wales.
- Christine Ann Roberts. For services to the community in Fairford, Gloucestershire.
- James Richard Roberts, Coastguard Rescue Officer, Maritime and Coastguard Agency. For voluntary service to Maritime Safety in the Isle of Wight.
- Linda Irene Roberts, Area Manager for Control Function, North Wales Fire and Rescue Service. For services to Local Government.
- Dr James Downie Robertson. For services to the Visual Arts in Scotland.
- Trevor David Rodda. For services to the Rural Economy in Cornwall.
- John William Rogers. For voluntary service to Young People in Perthshire.
- Christopher Allen Rollason. For voluntary service to the Royal Sussex Regimental Association.
- Victoria Rosin, Assistant Chief Executive of Cultural Services, Manchester City Council. For services to Local Government.
- Archie Ross. For services to the community in Greenford, Middlesex.
- Margaret Rothwell. For services to the community in North Liverpool.
- Dennise Jennifer Rowe, Unison Branch Secretary, Gloucestershire Constabulary. For services to the Police and to the Voluntary Sector.
- Alan Thomas Rowntree. For voluntary service to Blackburn Cathedral and to the community in East Lancashire.
- Chinwe Chukwuogo-Roy, Artist. For services to Art.
- Elizabeth Kinloch Roy. For voluntary service to Heritage in Clackmannanshire.
- Julie Rudge. For services to the community in Hartlepool.
- Michael John Runswick. For services to the Dunn Human Nutrition Unit, Medical Research Council, Cambridge.
- Margaret Rushton, Community Crime Prevention Officer, Lancashire Constabulary. For services to the Police.
- Yusuf Saleh, Administration Officer, Pension Disability and Carers' Service, Department for Work and Pensions. For public and voluntary service.
- Avtar Singh Sandhu. For services to the community in North West Kent.
- Philip Norman Saunders. For voluntary service to Hearing-Impaired People in Bath.
- Doreen Savage, Member, Felixstowe Town Council. For services to Local Government.
- Peter John David Scarlett. For services to the community in Bishop's Stortford, Hertfordshire.
- Richard Joseph Schembri, Vehicle Examiner, Ministry of Defence.
- Euna Janet Scott. For services to the community in Perthshire.
- Janet Grace McFarlane Scott. For services to Speech and Language Therapy in Scotland.
- John Brough Scott, Chairman, Injured Jockeys' Fund and Horseracing Journalist. For services to Sport.
- Philemon Alexis Carlisle Sealy, JP. For services to the community in the London Borough of Brent.
- David Simon Segelman. For services to Jewish People in North London.
- Ian Shand, lately Janitor, Arduthie Primary School, Stonehaven, Aberdeenshire. For services to Education.
- Thomas Henry Shanks. For services to the community in Lanark.
- Philip Sharp, Technical Manager, QinetiQ. For services to the Defence Industry.
- Patricia Sheridan. For voluntary service to Stockfield Community Association, South East Birmingham.
- Terence Eric Short, Coastguard Helicopter Aircrewman, Maritime and Coastguard Agency, Department for Transport. For public and voluntary service.
- Allan George Sinclair. For services to the Funeral Profession.
- Sangeeta Elizabeth Singh, Founder, Duke of Cambridge. For services to the Organic Gastropub Trade.
- Michael Andrew Skuce. For public service.
- Dr Isobel Alice Smart. For voluntary service to the community in Wimborne, Dorset.
- Roger Guy Smee. For voluntary service to Young People in Berkshire.
- Martin Smiddy. For services to Education and to Young People in Frodsham, Cheshire.
- Derek George Smith. For services to the City of London Corporation.
- Elaine Smith. For services to the community in Blackpool, Lancashire.
- Elaine Smith, Road Safety Assistant, Central Scotland Police. For services to the community in Stirling.
- Jean Margaret Smith, Grade C1, Ministry of Defence.
- Judith Smith. For voluntary service to the community in Revidge, Blackburn, Lancashire.
- Raymond Smith. For services to the community in Poole, Dorset.
- Stephen Andrew Smith. For voluntary service to Young People with Special Needs through the Camp Cando Organisation.
- The Reverend Eric Smyth. For services to the community in Belfast.
- Helen Watkins-Snart. For voluntary service to the Croydon Music Festival.
- Councillor Manjula Sood. For services to the community in Leicester.
- Glyn Spalding, QPM. For services to the Voluntary Sector.
- Rosemary Spencer, Higher Officer, Customer Correspondence Business Manager, HM Revenue and Customs.
- Donald Robert Stacey. For services to the community in Haslemere, Surrey.
- Sister Sabina Staff, Co-Founder, Fireside Day Centre. For voluntary service to Homeless People in Birmingham.
- Raymond Stafford. For charitable services to the community in Crewe, Cheshire.
- Julia Margarita Stallibrass, lately Head of Specialised Commissioning, National Specialised Commissioning Group. For services to the NHS.
- Jane Stanton-Roberts. For voluntary service to the Dancing Eye Support Trust.
- The Very Rev Henry Edward Champneys Stapleton. For services to the Church of England.
- Hilary Vera Steel. For voluntary service to Rugby League in the North West.
- David Brian Stevens, Grade B2, Ministry of Defence.
- Robert Stevenson. For voluntary service to Sport and to the Scouts in Northern Ireland.
- Ronald Nelson Stewart. For public service.
- Jennifer Gwenfron Stiling, Vice-Chair, Weymouth College Corporation. For services to Further Education and to the community in Weymouth and Portland, Dorset.
- Donald Stirling. For voluntary service to People with Learning Disabilities in Scotland.
- Lynn Stokes. For services to the community in Hereford.
- Professor Helen Storey, Professor, London College of Fashion. For services to Art.
- Alan Sturley. For services to Young People in Warwickshire.
- Pauline Anne Stuttard, Executive Officer, Jobcentre Plus, Department for Work and Pensions.
- Rabbi Aryeh Moshe Sufrin. For services to the Jewish Community Relations and to Drugsline in North East London.
- Stuart Tagg, Chief Executive, Greenham Common Community Trust. For services to Business and to the community in Berkshire and Hampshire.
- Dr Haifa Takruri-Rizk, Senior Lecturer in Engineering, University of Salford. For services to Women, Black and Minority Ethnic People in Science, Engineering and Technology Education.
- Daniel Henry Taubman. For services to Adult and Further Education.
- Emily Anita Taylor. For voluntary service to St Rocco's Hospice, Warrington, Cheshire.
- The Rev Canon Stephen Taylor. For services to the community in Sunderland.
- Paula Vivien Thacker. For voluntary service to Disabled People in Peterborough.
- Antonia Rosalinde Claire Thoday. For voluntary service to Chesham High School Pony Club, Buckinghamshire.
- Doris Ceinwen Thomas. For services to the community in Anglesey.
- Eleri Thomas, Head of Save the Children in Wales.
- Councillor Raymond Thomas. For services to Local Government in Merthyr Tydfil.
- Hugh Thompson, lately IT Director, Northumbria Police. For services to the Police.
- Phillip Roger Thompson, Public Affairs Officer, Chevron Texaco Ltd. For charitable services in Pembrokeshire.
- Sandra Denise Tilley, Assistant Director, UK Border Agency, Home Office.
- John Tinker. For services to the community in Barwick-in-Elmet, West Yorkshire.
- Robert Douglas Topping, Deputy Principal, Office of the First Minister and Deputy-First Minister, Northern Ireland Executive.
- William George Tranter. For charitable services in Uttoxeter, Staffordshire.
- Sally Jean Trotter, lately Assistant Traffic Manager. For services to the City of London Corporation.
- Margaret Teresa Mary Tuppen, President, Brighton Swimming Club and Secretary, Sussex County Amateur Swimming Association. For voluntary service to Sport.
- Councillor (Alderman) Eric Turner, Member, Derwentside District Council. For services to Local Government in County Durham.
- William Tyler, Chairman of Governors, North East Essex Adult Community College. For services to Adult Education.
- David John Tymon, Spacetrack Leader, Serco. For services to Science.
- Bernard Unsworth. For voluntary service to the Independent Monitoring Board at HM Prison Kirkham, Preston, Lancashire.
- Kenneth Unwin. For services to Rural Communities in Staffordshire.
- Caroline Jayne Vaughan, Grade C1, Ministry of Defence.
- Edna Sibley Walker, Bed Manager, The Walton Centre for Neurology and Neurosurgery NHS Trust. For services to Healthcare.
- Caroline Margaret Wallace, Quality Assurance Manager, Fire Service College, Department for Communities and Local Government. For public and voluntary service.
- Linda Helen Wallace, Director, Policy and Professional Services, British Dental Association. For services to Healthcare.
- Melvin John Walton, Caretaker, Norton College, North Yorkshire. For services to Education.
- Michael John Ward. For services to the community in Stone, Staffordshire.
- Stephen Douglas Wareing, Constable, British Transport Police. For services to the Police.
- Lieutenant Colonel Ronald Ernest Warren. For services to the community in Saxmundham, Suffolk.
- Gillian Watson. For services to Equestrian Sport.
- John Anthony West, lately Chief Technician, Nottingham City Hospital. For services to the NHS.
- Carole Westall. For voluntary service to Young People in Neath Port Talbot.
- Keith Weston, Lecturer in Fine Art, Staffordshire University. For services to Higher Education.
- Violet Susannah Weston, Proprietor, Olde Worlde Café, Bosherston. For services to the Hospitality and Tourist Industries in Pembrokeshire.
- Piers Adam White, Non-Executive Director, Ordnance Survey. For public service.
- Councillor Derek Waine Whitehead. For services to Stroke Patients.
- Valerie Ann Whiting, Administrator and Secretary, Oaklands College, Hertfordshire. For services to Further Education.
- John Robert Harry Whitwell, Senior Executive Officer, Jobcentre Plus, Department for Work and Pensions.
- Roslyn Joy Whitwell. For voluntary service to the community in Hardingham, Norfolk.
- Ann Carolyn Williams, Head, Electronic Customer Services, Electronic Vehicle Licensing, Driver and Vehicle Licensing Agency, Swansea, Department for Transport.
- Brian Stuart Williams. For voluntary service to Hereford Police Male Voice Choir.
- Prof Elizabeth Anne Williams, Professor of Education, University of Winchester. For services to Teacher Training.
- John Isgoed Williams. For services to Local Government in Wales.
- Justice Amariah Williams. For service to Young People in Birmingham.
- William Lloyd Williams. For services to the Meat Industry.
- Edmund Henry Wilson. For services to Athletics in Northern Ireland.
- John Dennis Wilson, Broadcaster and Author. For services to Angling.
- Judith Wilson, Enrolled Nurse, Southern General Hospital, Glasgow. For services to Healthcare.
- Mary Evelyn Wilson. For service to the community in Lytham St. Annes, Lancashire.
- Maurice Edward Wilson, House Team Manager, Scottish Government Headquarters, Scottish Executive.
- Anna Wing, Actor. For services to Drama and to Charity.
- Donald Herbert Charles Wix. For services to the community in Loughborough, Leicestershire.
- Joy Wolfe. For services to the community in Greater Manchester.
- Margaret Wolski, Customer Services Manager, Hunter Boot Ltd. For services to the Scottish Textile Industry.
- John Wood. For services to the Hairdressing Industry and to the community in Manchester.
- Malcolm Reginald Oliver Wood, Officer, Live Service Support, Information Management Services, HM Revenue and Customs. For public and voluntary service.
- Colin Robert Woodcock. For services to Law Enforcement.
- Hilary Woods, Senior Executive Officer, Jobcentre Plus, Department for Work and Pensions. For public and voluntary service.
- Dr Hazel Woodward, University Librarian and Director, Cranfield University Press. For services to Higher Education.
- Russell George Woolcock. For services to Agricultural and Rural Affairs in Devon.
- Stephen Woolford, Head of Interpretation and Collections, Imperial War Museum Duxford. For services to Heritage.
- Alfred Edward Youell. For charitable services.
- Iain Young, Chief Test Pilot, Marshall Aerospace. For services to the Aviation Industry.
- Margaret Elizabeth Young. For services to Nursing and to the community in Selkirk, Scottish Borders.
- Norman Edward Young. For charitable services in Northern Ireland.
- Margaret Eva Zier. For services to the community in Newport, South Wales.

Diplomatic Service and Overseas List

- John Philip Aspinall, President, Virgin Islands Search and Rescue. For services to the community, British Virgin Islands.
- Jonathan David Barker, Senior Consultant, Literature Department, British Council.
- Mesod Belilo, President, Justice of the Peace. For services to justice and to the community, Gibraltar.
- Fiona Mary Florence Bishop, Treasurer, The Royal British Legion. For services to British ex-servicemen and women, Hong Kong.
- Antony Brown, lately Pro-Consul, British High Commission, South Africa.
- The Honourable Dorothy Neletha Isobel Butterfield, JP, M.P., Founding Owner and Director, Children and Adults Reaching for Education (CARE). For services to education, Bermuda.
- Jacqueline Lesley Connor, Joint Co-founder and former Chair, Foreign and Commonwealth Office Lesbian and Gay Group.
- The Reverend Peter James Crooks. For services to seafarers and the community, Yemen.
- Graeme John Croxson, Second Secretary, Foreign and Commonwealth Office.
- Gerardo Del Guercio, Current IT Systems Workstream Manager, UK Border Agency International Group. For services to the creation and implementation of major IT systems.
- Susan Peta Donegan, lately Third Secretary, Foreign and Commonwealth Office. For services to consular assistance.
- Jonathan Iqbal Drew, Joint Co-founder and former Chair, Foreign and Commonwealth Office Lesbian and Gay Group.
- Alistair James Fortune, Military English Support Project Manager, British Council, Bosnia and Herzegovina.
- Joanna Elizabeth Genter, Third Secretary, Foreign and Commonwealth Office.
- Joy Katharine Ivy Goodricke. For services to charitable activities in Spain.
- Dorothy Heleen Hobbs, Vice Consul Nationality, British High Commission, South Africa.
- Richard Eric Blake-James, Second Secretary, Foreign and Commonwealth Office.
- Laurence Edward Jemetta, First Secretary, Foreign and Commonwealth Office.
- George Fender Jones. For services to the British war dead at the Dürnbach Commonwealth War Grave, Munich.
- Cecil William Lake. For services to culture, sports and the community, Montserrat.
- Alastair Stronach MacDonald. For services to the resolution of boundary disputes in Africa and to cartography more generally.
- Robin Andrew Marshall, Journalist. Lately Managing Editor, The Budapest Sun. For services to British/Hungarian relations.
- Francis McGurk, lately Deputy Director, European School of Brussels. For services to education in Belgium.
- Emily Adamberry Olivero. For services to the community in the field of mental health, Gibraltar.
- Emma Elizabeth Ross, Second Secretary, Foreign and Commonwealth Office.
- Dr. Geoffrey Denis Summers, Lecturer, Middle East Technical University, Ankara. For services to British archaeological research in Turkey.
- James Brian Thompson, Manager, Trade and Investment, British Consulate-General, Australia.
- David Lawson Waters. For services to underprivileged young people and to cricket in Kenya.
- Coral Rose Yon, Lieutenant, Salvation Army. For services to the community, St. Helena.

=== Royal Red Cross (RRC) ===
==== Associate of the Royal Red Cross (ARRC) ====
- Captain Christine Birkby, Queen Alexandra's Royal Army Nursing Corps, 559278.
- Warrant Officer Class 2 Angela Allison Jones, Queen Alexandra's Royal Army Nursing Corps, Q1018524.

=== Queen's Police Medal (QPM) ===
England and Wales

- Mohammed Aziz, Constable, West Yorkshire Police.
- Laura Anne Burford, Constable, West Midlands Police.
- Simon Charles Foy, Commander, Metropolitan Police Service.
- Brian Gaddas, Superintendent, Merseyside Police.
- Graeme Gerrard, Deputy Chief Constable, Cheshire Constabulary.
- Alun Goode, lately Superintendent, Metropolitan Police Service.
- Stewart John Gull, Detective Chief Superintendent, Suffolk Constabulary.
- Jennifer Lynne Harding, Detective Sergeant, Surrey Police.
- Peter Jones, Detective Sergeant, Devon and Cornwall Constabulary.
- Kenneth Kelly, Detective Chief Superintendent, Leicestershire Constabulary.
- Carolyn Heather Kinrade, Superintendent, Isle of Man Constabulary.
- Alexander John Marshall, Chief Constable, Hampshire Constabulary.
- Nigel Mark Mawer, Detective Chief Superintendent, Metropolitan Police Service.
- Peter Rawkins, Sergeant, Bedfordshire Police.
- Graham Mark Sunderland, lately Assistant Chief Constable, Cumbria Constabulary.
- Michael Taylor, Detective Superintendent, Metropolitan Police Service.
- Anthony Christopher Hall-Turner, Detective Constable, Metropolitan Police Service.
- Christopher Wiltshire, Constable, Kent Police.

Scotland

- John Geates, Director, Scottish Police College.
- John Neilson. Assistant Chief Constable, Strathclyde Police.

Northern Ireland

- Alan Robert William Gawne, Sergeant, Police Service of Northern Ireland.
- David Hugh Kirk, Sergeant, Police Service of Northern Ireland.
- Robert Alexander Toner, Assistant Chief Constable, Police Service of Northern Ireland.

=== Queen's Fire Services Medal (QFSM) ===
England and Wales

- Leslie Bowman, Watch Manager, London Fire Brigade.
- Nicholas Collins, Assistant Commissioner, London Fire Brigade.
- Ian Goodman, Fire-fighter, Cleveland Fire Brigade.
- Christopher Griffin, Deputy Chief Fire Officer, Gloucestershire Fire and Rescue Service and Head of Gloucestershire's Emergency Management Service.

Scotland

- Joseph James Harkins, Crew Commander, Strathclyde Fire and Rescue.
- Brian Ritchie Hughes, Retained Watch Manager, Tayport Fire Station, Fife Fire and Rescue Service.
- David Hutchison, Assistant Chief Officer, Strathclyde Fire and Rescue.

=== Queen's Volunteer Reserves Medal (QVRM) ===
Royal Navy

- Chief Petty Officer Air Engineering Artificer (Electrical) Christopher Bailes, Royal Naval Reserve, D975634G.
- Lieutenant Commander Clive Francis Langmead, RD, Royal Naval Reserve, C991155F.

Army

- Warrant Officer Class 2 Thomas Sayoue Barney, The Parachute Regiment, Territorial Army, 24167611.
- Colonel Maria Alicia Josephina Guzkowska, TD, late Intelligence Corps, Territorial Army, 513057.
- Colonel Richard Clive Hambleton, TD, late The Royal Logistic Corps, Territorial Army, 515260.
- Warrant Officer Class 2 Peter Arthur Mudd, The Royal Logistic Corps, Territorial Army, 24654844.
- Brigadier Gregory Stephen Smith, TD, DL, late The Royal Green Jackets, Territorial Army, 517219.

Royal Air Force

- Flight Sergeant Allan McFarlane Robertson (S2629992), Royal Auxiliary Air Force.

=== Colonial Police and Fire Service Medal (CPM) ===
- Michael William Needham, Police Superintendent, Royal Cayman Islands Police Service.

== Australia ==
The Queen's Birthday Honours 2009 for Australia were announced on 8 June 2009.

== New Zealand ==
The 2009 Queen's Birthday Honours for New Zealand were announced on 1 June 2009.

== The Bahamas ==
=== Order of Saint Michael and Saint George ===
==== Companion of the Order of St Michael and St George (CMG) ====
- Anita Doreen Bernard. For services as a public officer.
- Frederick A. Hazlewood (Jr). For services to business.
- Bishop Elgarnet Rahming. For services to Religion.

=== Order of the British Empire ===
==== Officer of the Order of the British Empire (OBE) ====
Civil Division

- Dr. Robert O. Antoni. For services to health and to the community.
- George Cox. For services to civil and structural engineering.
- Lowell Mortimer. For public service and services to the Church and to the community.
- Harcourt Lowell Turnquest. For services as a public officer.

==== Member of the Order of the British Empire (MBE) ====
Civil Division

- Basil Christe. For services to the community, education, Religion and to the Special Olympics.
- Canon Fitz Goodridge. For services to Religion.
- Cecil Bernard Longley. For services to education.
- Sandra Moore. For services to the Church and to the community.
- Fred Solomon Ramsey. For services to politics and to the insurance industry.
- John L. Rolle (Sr). For services to business.
- Edna Mae Russell. For services to education.

=== British Empire Medal (BEM) ===
Civil Division

- Maria Forbes. For services to education.
- Wendell Carver Grant (Sr). For services to civics and to Religion.
- Doddridge MacLagan Hunt. For public service and services to the Church and to the community.
- Sheila McDonald. For public services and services to the community.
- Oswald Cory Munnings. For services to the financial industry and to the Church.
- The Reverend Wilbur St.Clair Outten. For services to Religion and to the community.
- Arthur M. Sherman (Jr). For services to civics and to Religion.
- Dennis Lloyd Turnquest. For services to politics, sport, business, insurance management and to the community.

=== Queen's Police Medal (QPM) ===
- Shannondor Harold Evans, Assistant Commissioner, Royal Bahamas Police Force.
- Sylvester Augustus George, lately Chief Superintendent, Royal Bahamas Police Force. For services as musician, arranger, conductor and administrator, Royal Bahamas Police Band.

== Grenada ==
=== Order of the British Empire ===
==== Officer of the Order of the British Empire (OBE) ====
Civil Division

- George Anthony Richard Menezes. For services to business.

=== British Empire Medal (BEM) ===
Civil Division

- Dexter F. Leggard. For services to youth and to culture.
- Anthony Welsh. For services to the State.

== Papua New Guinea ==
=== Knight Bachelor ===
- Leonard Wilson Kamit, CBE. For services to the Bank of Papua New Guinea and to the management of the national monetary policy.

=== Order of Saint Michael and Saint George ===
==== Knight Commander of the Order of St Michael and St George (KCMG) ====
- The Right Honourable Sir Mekere Morauta. For services to the community, to the public service and to politics.

==== Companion of the Order of St Michael and St George (CMG) ====
- The Most Reverend Bishop Ambrose Kiapseni. For services to the Catholic Church as Bishop of Kavieng, and to the community of New Ireland.

=== Order of the British Empire ===
==== Knight Commander of the Order of the British Empire (KBE) ====
Civil Division

- The Honourable Dr. Puka Temu, CMG. For services to public administration, politics and the community.

==== Commander of the Order of the British Empire (CBE) ====
Civil Division

- Peter Garth Johnson. For services to commerce, politics and to the East Sepik Province.
- Dr. Joseph Kaven. For services to health and medical research, particularly in infectious disease control.
- The Honourable Dr. Allan S. M. Marat, MP. For services to law, national government and the East New Britain community.
- Jeffrey Charles Wall, OBE. For services to the Australia–Papua New Guinea relationship.

==== Officer of the Order of the British Empire (OBE) ====
Military Division

- 86426 Colonel Vagi Oala, Papua New Guinea Defence Force.

Civil Division

- Lawrence Samogoto Acanufa. For services to the government, the legal profession and to the community.
- Henry Francis Evans. For services to education and to the community of the Sandaun Province.
- Don Fox. For services to commerce, the community and sport.
- The Reverend Andrew Kalai. For services to the community, welfare services and to the Salvation Army.
- David Webb Kanawi. For services to the community and to agricultural development.
- Richard Emmanuel Kassman. For services to commerce, the International Education Agency and to Transparency International (PNG) Inc.
- Sister Peter Mary Kennedy. For services to the Catholic Church, education and religious formation of women.
- Friend Ila'ava Kini. For services to commerce and journalism.
- The Reverend Father Paul Mercieca. For services to the Catholic Church in West and East Sepik and the National Capital District.
- Nelson Paulias. For services to public administration and tourism.
- The Right Reverend Sommy Setu. For services to the community and to the Evangelical Lutheran Church.
- Andrew Dallas Sterns, MBE. For services to the Royal Papua New Guinea Constabulary.
- Simon Tosali. For public service, particularly as Secretary of the Department of Treasury.

==== Member of the Order of the British Empire (MBE) ====
Military Division

- 811615 Major P. Guri Kaminiel, Papua New Guinea Defence Force.
- 88107 Lieutenant Colonel Peter Nugam, Papua New Guinea Defence Force.
- 88665 Lieutenant Colonel Carl Wrakonei, Papua New Guinea Defence Force.

Civil Division

- William Alu. For services to education and the community.
- Linda Angai. For services to the Church and to healthcare.
- Vere Arava. For services to business management and to the United Church.
- Charlie Arua. For public service in Agriculture and Livestock.
- Matthew Bine. For public service in the Correctional Services.
- Stanley John Carswell. For services to the community through promoting Australia–Papua New Guinea relations.
- Janetta Douglas. For services to commerce and charities, especially through helping people living with disabilities.
- Sister Shirley Gallagher. For services to the Catholic Church and to education.
- Ere Kariko. For services to public administration and to the legal profession.
- Giossi Labi, QPM. For services to the Royal Papua New Guinea Constabulary.
- Dr. Samuel Boro Lahis. For public service in Agriculture and Livestock.
- Blasius Loi. For services to agriculture and rural development.
- The Reverend Elisha Bob Lutu. For services to the community and to the Christian Life Centre.
- Pius Mark. For services to the community and to the Mount Hagen Technical College.
- Molly Asera Moihau. For public service in the Correctional Services.
- Dr. Rona Nibeta Nadile. For public service in the administration of employment and training.
- Kapi Natto. For services to the community and the Prison Fellowship Papua New Guinea Council.
- Sang Chung Poh. For services to commerce and to charities.
- Simon Paul Poraituk. For services to the community and to the National Museum and Art Gallery.
- Rosemary Robertson. For services to the community, education and charitable organisations.
- Jonathan Saing. For services to the community.
- Sam Masakuman Tasion. For services to commerce and to the community.
- Dominic Tomar. For public service in the Correctional Services.
- Anthony Wagambie, QPM. For services to the Royal Papua New Guinea Constabulary.
- Lynn Wood. For services to education and to the Summer Institute of Linguistics.

=== Companion of the Imperial Service Order (ISO) ===
- Tom Dangiaba. For public service.
- Mervyn Gairi Sumpa. For public service.

=== British Empire Medal (BEM) ===
Military Division

- 88892 Sergeant Washington Banian, Papua New Guinea Defence Force.
- 88110 Warrant Officer Wanu Jonah Gegama, Papua New Guinea Defence Force.
- 85090 Warrant Officer Robert Kua, Papua New Guinea Defence Force.
- 87987 Chief Warrant Officer Michael Ntona, Papua New Guinea Defence Force.
- 87213 Chief Warrant Officer Linus Numiman, Papua New Guinea Defence Force.

Civil Division

- Samson Andalu Anga. For services to education and to the Evangelical Church.
- Siwok Apuai. For public service in the Correctional Services.
- Kani Avaovao. For services to Village Court and to the community.
- Francis Awuar. For services to education.
- Habia Babe. For services to education and the Hela community.
- Thomas Berum. For services to the community.
- Pukari Gerald. For public service in Agriculture and Livestock.
- Iuki Gereson. For public service in the Correctional Services.
- Solomon Hopkos. For public service.
- Noke Kaiye. For services to the community.
- Michael M. Karapen. For services to the community and to sport.
- Getru Kiagi. For services to rural healthcare.
- Michael Koke. For services to the community.
- Kiko Konto. For public service.
- Yombi Kumbiye. For services to education and to the community.
- Willie Kunauna. For services to the Church and to the community.
- Kani Kut. For services to the community.
- James Lembo. For public service.
- Hariba Mamaea. For services to the Police Force and to the community.
- Randolph Naembo. For services to the Police Force and to Government House.
- Jenny Nindil. For services to education and to the community.
- Janet Gerea Pat Okirua. For services to the community and to education.
- Pius Porifau. For public service in the Correctional Services.
- Tauna Puka. For services to education and to the community.
- Martin Sangon. For services to the community and to local level government.
- Judy Tara. For public service in the Correctional Services.
- Materua Taureka. For services to the community and to the United Church.
- Anis Tiki. For services to the community.
- Linus Tondrih. For public service.
- Katop Tun. For services to education.
- Boroba Benson Uware. For services to the community.
- Thalavu Varaelea. For services to the community and to land mediation.
- Nina Gani Verave. For public service in Agriculture and Livestock.
- Pala Walo. For services to education and to the community.
- Alung Wang. For services to the community.
- John Wanoe. For services to the community and to the Foursquare Gospel Mission.

== Tuvalu ==
=== Order of the British Empire ===
==== Officer of the Order of the British Empire (OBE) ====
Civil Division

- Solofa Uota. For public service and services to the community.

==== Member of the Order of the British Empire (MBE) ====
Civil Division

- Taulu Isaako. For public service and services to the community.
- Saaga Kine. For services to the community.
- Fauoa Maani. For public service and services to the community.

=== British Empire Medal (BEM) ===
Civil Division

- Lovine Anelu. For services to the community.
- Samola Puga. For services to the community.
- Senitima Saitala. For services to the community.

== Saint Lucia ==
=== Order of Saint Michael and Saint George ===
==== Companion of the Order of St Michael and St George (CMG) ====
- Edwin Pontien Joseph Laurent, OBE. For services to international relations and diplomacy.

=== Order of the British Empire ===
==== Officer of the Order of the British Empire (OBE) ====
Civil Division

- Cosmos Damian Richardson. For services to the Nation and to the public sector.
- Eldridge Stephens. For services to the community and small business development.

==== Member of the Order of the British Empire (MBE) ====
Civil Division

- Monsignor Justin Albert Dowling Barthelmy. For services to the Catholic Church in St. Lucia.
- Jeff Eyre Titus Elva. For services to music and to the disabled community.
- Joan Alexander Stowe. For services to the tourism industry.
- Horace Denis Walters. For services to the fisheries sector.

=== British Empire Medal (BEM) ===
Civil Division

- Martha Francis-Biscette. For services to the Girl Guide movement.
- Verena Marcelle Felicien. For services to sport in the field of women's cricket.
- David Hutchinson. For services to tourism and to the transportation sector.
- Benedicte Martha Nelson. For services to the Scout movement.
- Gilbert John Popo. For services to agriculture.

== Belize ==
=== Order of the British Empire ===
==== Officer of the Order of the British Empire (OBE) ====
Civil Division

- Ignacio Federico Vega. For public and community service.

==== Member of the Order of the British Empire (MBE) ====
Civil Division

- M. Salvador Habet (Sr.), JP. For services to business and to the community.
- Simon Quan, JP. For services to business and to the community.
- Lindsay Wade (Jr.). For public service.

== Antigua and Barbuda ==
=== Order of the British Empire ===
==== Member of the Order of the British Empire (MBE) ====
Civil Division

- Rosemarie V. McMaster. For public service.
