= Alison McCullough =

Speech and language therapist

Alison Patricia McCullough MBE
- Occupation: Speech Therapist

Alison Patricia McCullough MBE is a speech and language therapist and the current head of the Northern Ireland office of the Royal College of Speech and Language Therapists. McCullough was appointed MBE for services to speech and language in the 2009 Birthday Honours. In March 2019 she was a joint winner of the 'Lifetime Commitment to the Third Sector' award from the Northern Ireland Chamber of Commerce.

== Publications ==
- 2001. "Viability and Effectiveness of Teletherapy for Pre-School Children with Special Needs", International Journal of Language & Communication Disorders 36, 321–326.
