= Barbara Hakin =

Former health executive

Dame Barbara Ann Hakin DBE (born December 1952) is a former Deputy Chief Executive of NHS England. She was formerly the Chief Executive of the East Midlands Strategic Health Authority. She was formerly a General Practitioner in Bradford. She was involved a controversy around patient safety, in which she was referred to the General Medical Council. The case was closed in 2017. Hakin was created a Dame Commander of the Order of the British Empire in the 2009 Queens Birthday Honours List.

== Life ==
Barbara Ann Hakin was born in December 1952. She is a former Deputy Chief Executive of NHS England. She was formerly the Chief Executive of the East Midlands Strategic Health Authority. She was also formerly a General Practitioner in Bradford. She was said by the Health Service Journal to be the 16th most powerful person (and most influential woman) in the English NHS in December 2013, and her salary (£195,000) in 2013 was the seventh highest in the NHS. As of 2015, Hakin was paid a salary of between £200,000 and £204,999 by NHS England, making her one of the 328 most highly paid people in the British public sector at that time.

Hakin was created a Dame Commander of the Order of the British Empire in the 2009 Queens Birthday Honours List.

In July 2015 she announced that she would retire by the end of the year.

== Controversy ==
She was accused of disregarding patient safety in a drive to ensure trusts met performance targets when chief executive of the East Midlands Strategic Health Authority in 2009 by Private Eye journalists Andrew Bousfield and Dr. Phil Hammond. 17 allegations were made by and related mainly to her treatment of former United Lincolnshire Hospitals NHS Trust chief executive Gary Walker. She was referred to the General Medical Council. In October 2013, GMC case examiners ruled that the case be closed as there was no realistic prospect of finding her fitness to practice as a physician had been impaired in relation to any of the claims.
