= Solofa Uota =

Tuvaluan politician

Solofa Uota is a Tuvaluan politician and diplomat who has served in various functions in his country's government.

He has been Permanent Secretary of Education, and, more recently, Secretary to Government.

He had previously served as a diplomat, and was Acting High Commissioner to Fiji.

From 2001 to 2002, he was Secretary of the Tuvalu Trust Fund Directory.

In the 2009 Birthday Honours, he was appointed Officer of the Order of the British Empire (OBE) by the Queen of Tuvalu, Elizabeth II, for "public service and services to the community".
