= Katharine Doré =

Katharine Emma Doré, OBE, (born February 1960) is a British theatrical producer who established the Adventures in Motion Pictures troupe. She is a vice-president and co-founder of Ambitious about Autism. Doré was appointed Officer of the British Empire in the 2009 Birthday Honours list for "services to Special Needs Education".
