= Marilyn Comrie =

British technology entrepreneur

Marilyn Comrie Order of the British Empire
- Education: University of Birmingham; University of Central Lancashire
- Awards: Kofi Annan African Leadership Excellence Award

Marilyn Comrie is a British technology entrepreneur who is Director of Business for the Blair Project. She was awarded an Order of the British Empire in the 2009 Birthday Honours. She serves as Vice President of the Greater Manchester Chambers of Commerce.

== Early life and education ==
Comrie studied chemistry at the University of Birmingham, and graduated in 1984. She was the first woman to serve as President of the Afro-Caribbean society. She moved to the University of Central Lancashire to complete a postgraduate diploma in radio and television.

== Career ==
Comrie joined the BBC in 1986, where she spent fifteen years on the production of television programmes. Comrie has three sons, two of whom are passionate about motorsport. Together they established a social enterprise that supports people from disadvantaged backgrounds build and race cars. The enterprise, the Blair Project, helps high school students to use 3D printing to create cars that compete in challenges. Comrie was appointed Director of Business Development for the Blair Project in 2014. Since her appointment, Comrie has concentrated on supporting young people who are at risk of becoming involved with gangs in identifying meaningful employment in professions that combat climate change. The Blair Project was awarded £4 million to create an Innovation Activities Hub in Manchester that looks to re-skill low-income residents who are unemployed. Keen to support girls and women in motorsport, Comrie launched Formula Girl, a sports brand aimed at women.

She was named a Fellow of the In-Four group in 2019. The scheme supported Comrie to increase access to computer-aided design and additive manufacturing. It involves providing equipment, training and support to business owners and managers. Comrie simultaneously established STEM the Gap, which looks to improve gender equality in technology and engineering. She was elected to the Board of the Greater Sport in 2020, an organisation that looks to increase Mancunian's participation in sport.

Comrie is Vice President of the Greater Manchester Chambers of Commerce, a non-profit that supports business people in Manchester.

== Awards and honours ==
Comrie was appointed a Officer of the Order of the British Empire for services to women's enterprise in 2009. She was also awarded the Kofi Annan African Leadership Excellence Award. In 2018 she received an honorary doctorate from the University of Birmingham.
