= Jane Slowey =

Jane E. Slowey CBE (died 2017) was a British charity worker who was the Chief Executive of The Foyer Federation.

Jane Slowey became Chief Executive of the young people's housing charity The Foyer Federation in 2004. She was Chair of 'Skills – Third Sector', a national charity that champions skills development among volunteers and paid staff in voluntary organizations, charities and social enterprises. Slowey was Vice Chair of the National Council for Voluntary Organisations from 2003 to 2008. She was previously chief executive of Birmingham Voluntary Youth Service Council. Slowey was the Vice Chair of the West Midlands Regional Assembly. She was an elected Labour councillor on Birmingham City Council from 1988 to 1992 and from 1994 to 1998, and chaired the Community Affairs Committee of the Council. Slowey stood as Labour candidate in the 1992 general election for the Birmingham Hall Green constituency, coming in second place.

Slowey was appointed a Commander of the Order of the British Empire for services to disadvantaged young people in the 2009 Birthday Honours. She was awarded the honorary degree of Doctor of Laws by Newman University for her contribution to the third sector and charitable works. She was also awarded an honorary degree of Doctor of the University (DUniv) by the University of Birmingham in 2014.

Jane Slowey graduated from Birmingham University in 1974 with a BA degree in French and Italian. She sang in the Parliament Choir. She was married to Birmingham Northfield MP Richard Burden.

Jane Slowey died of cancer on 7 October 2017.
