= Frances Corner =

British fashion academic (born 1959)

Frances Corner OBE FRSA
- Born: Frances Marie Agnew
- Education: Central Saint Martins (BA); Chelsea College of Arts (MA); University of Oxford (DPhil)
- Spouse: Anthony Corner (m. 1980)
- Children: 1
- Website: Official website

Frances Marie Corner, OBE, FRSA (née Agnew; born 25 February 1959) is a British art and design historian and academic, specialising in fashion. She was the head of the London College of Fashion from 2005 to 2019, and a pro vice-chancellor of the University of the Arts London from 2013 to 2019. She taught at the University of Gloucestershire and London Metropolitan University. Corner was Warden of Goldsmiths, University of London from 2019.

== Education ==
Corner received her BA at Central Saint Martins and her MA from the Chelsea School of Art. She went to Oxford University for her DPhil.

== Goldsmiths ==
Corner became Warden of Goldsmiths, University of London in 2019. During Corner’s tenure, Goldsmiths faced financial pressures and pursued cost-cutting and restructuring proposals, including staff reductions. The cuts were opposed by the Goldsmiths University and College Union (UCU) and students.

On 1 October 2025 it was announced that Professor Frances Corner had stepped down with immediate effect as Vice-Chancellor of Goldsmiths.

== Personal life ==
In 1980, the then Frances Marie Agnew married Anthony Peter Corner. Together, they have one son.

In the 2009 Queen's Birthday Honours, Corner was appointed an Officer of the Order of the British Empire (OBE) for services to the fashion industry.

== Books ==
- Corner, Frances (2014). Why Fashion Matters. London: Thames & Hudson. ISBN 978-0500517376.
