= Andrew John Cash =

English hospital administrator (born 1955)

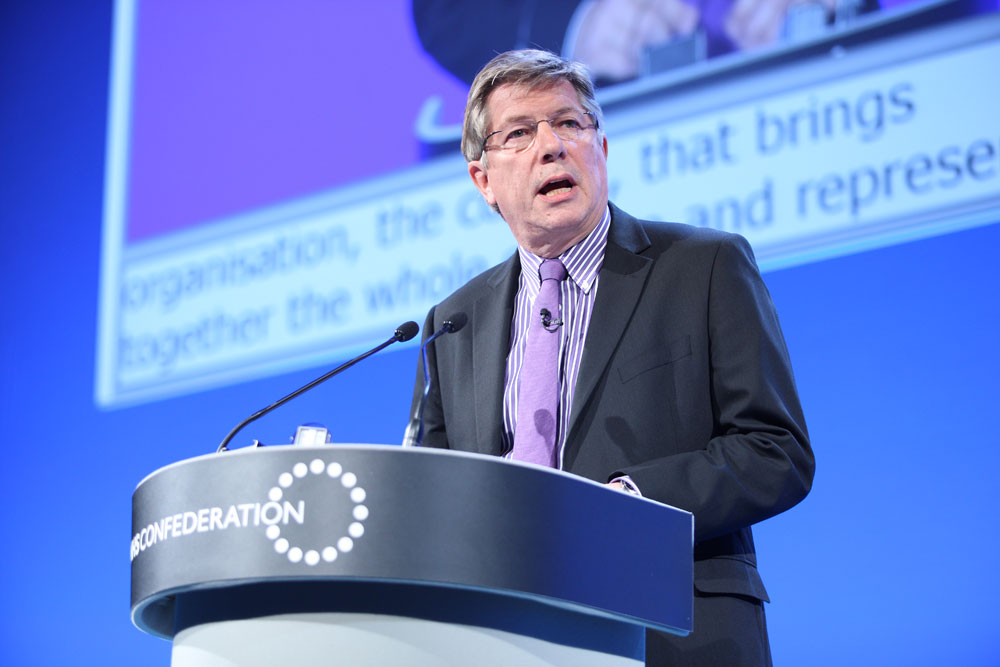
Sir Andrew Cash

Sir Andrew John Cash OBE GCStJ (born 14 October 1955) was Chief Executive of Sheffield Teaching Hospitals NHS Foundation Trust. He retired from the role early 2019.

He was educated at Bristol Grammar School, the University of East Anglia (BA, Economic and Social History) and the University of Leeds.

In 2015 the Health Service Journal judged him as the second to top Chief Executive in the National Health Service.

== Honours ==
Cash was appointed an Officer of the Order of the British Empire (OBE) for services to Health Care in the 2001 New Year Honours. He was later knighted in the 2009 Birthday Honours, again for services to Healthcare.

Cash was awarded an Honorary DCL degree by the University of East Anglia in 2012.

He was made a Knight of Justice of the Order of Saint John of Jerusalem (KStJ) on 29 January 2020, and promoted to Bailiff Grand Cross of the same Order (GCStJ) on 21 January 2026.
