= Joseph Kaven =

Joseph Kaven CBE is a Papua New Guinean physician who works at Nonga Base Hospital, Rabaul, East New Britain. He has worked on improving health service access to rural areas of Papua New Guinea.

Kaven was appointed Commander of the Order of the British Empire (CBE) in the 2009 Birthday Honours for "service to health and medical research, particularly in infectious disease control".
