= Change, Grow, Live =

UK voluntary sector organisation

Change Grow Live
- Abbreviation: CGL
- Type: Company Limited by Guarantee in England and Wales No. 3861209
- Registration no.: Registered Charity in England and Wales No. 1079327 and Scotland No. SC039861
- Headquarters: Brighton, United Kingdom
- Website: www.changegrowlive.org
- Formerly called: Crime Reduction Initiatives (CRI)

Change Grow Live (CGL) is a voluntary sector organisation specialising in substance misuse and criminal justice intervention projects in England and Wales. All of its funding is statutory-based. As of 2012 the organisation employed over 1,800 workers and was supported by over 250 volunteers. CGL was formerly named Crime Reduction Initiatives (CRI), but changed its name in 2016.

== History ==
The organisation traces its origins to the Sussex Association for the Rehabilitation of Offenders (Saro), a prisoner rehabilitation charity established in 1977. This subsequently adopted a national remit, and changed its name to Crime Reduction Initiatives. As it broadened its activities from dealing with criminal rehabilitation to wider aspects of social support, it changed its name again in 2016 to Change Grow Live.

== Services ==
CGL is a national provider of support, treatment and rehabilitation programmes for those with substance misuse problems, crime and lack of opportunity. CGL's service users include:

- Adults and young people with substance misuse problems
- People who are homeless and living and working on the streets
- Offenders in prison and those serving community sentences
- Families and communities affected by crime, substance misuse and anti-social behaviour
- Victims of domestic abuse

CGL services include: Key-work sessions, Counselling, Benefits and housing advice, Outreach, Mutual Aid meetings (such as SMART Recovery, Narcotics Anonymous), Needle exchange, Sexual Health awareness, Medical assistance, Prescribing, Complementary therapies and general support in living a healthy and balanced life. CGL partners with many agencies to provide treatment and co-ordinated care pathways that include housing, employment, education and training.

CGL have a variety of different services across the nation. Notable services include their Wirral Ways to Recovery which featured in the 2022 BBC documentary, Addiction: The Recovery. The documentary followed two service users over the period of a year and looked into the "Recovery Village" that Wirral Ways to Recovery and Change Grow Live have set up in Birkenhead.

In the 2000–01 financial year, CGL's income was £2.1m. In 2011–12 it was £80.8m.
