= Gwyneth Lewis (scientist) =

Maternal health researcher

- Education: University College London
- Awards: Order of the British Empire
- Scientific career
- Workplaces: University College London

Gwyneth Helen Lewis OBE is a British physician who is a professor at University College London. She previously served as National Clinical Director for Maternal Health and Maternity Services for the Department of Health. Lewis helped to write Maternity Matters, a strategy that outlined the future of maternity care in the United Kingdom.

== Early life and education ==
Lewis attended Oxford High School, England. She attended the UCL Medical School, where she earned her bachelor's degree in medicine and surgery and started her medical career as a surgical specialist. Lewis developed severe arthritis in her hands. She held positions in general practise and obstetrics. She believed that she would have a greater impact in the Department of Health and Social Care, working to support the National Health Service, and trained in public health. One of her first responsibilities was leading an HIV/AIDS clinic at the height of the first epidemic.

== Research and career ==
Lewis was recruited to the University College London Institute for Women's Health as Lead for International Women's Health Research. She studies national and international maternal health. Lewis was responsible for the UK Confidential Enquiries into Maternal Deaths. This research project, has helped reduce poor health and morbidity. In the 1999 report, Lewis identified that maternal mortality rates were higher for very young women, those from lower socioeconomic backgrounds and those from particular socioeconomic groups. She served as tsar for maternity services until 2011.

Lewis worked with the World Health Organization on Beyond the numbers, a study and guidebook that looks to improve the quality of maternal and newborn care. She received funding from the British Council to create My Sister, My Self, a short film that explored birth, motherhood and child loss amongst mothers around the world.

== Awards and honours ==
- 2008 Bournemouth University Honorary Doctorate
- 2009 Order of the British Empire for her work on Maternal Health
- 2010 City, University of London Doctor of Science Honoris Causa

== Selected publications ==
- Jennifer Hall; Sue Mann; Gwyneth Lewis; Judith Stephenson; Chelsea Morroni (26 October 2015). "Conceptual framework for integrating 'Pregnancy Planning and Prevention' (P3)". BMJ Sexual and Reproductive Health. 42 (1): 75–76. doi:10.1136/jfprhc-2015-101310. ISSN 1471-1893. PMID 26504110. Wikidata Q59944930.
- Gwyneth Lewis (1 February 2012). "Saving Mothers' Lives: the continuing benefits for maternal health from the United Kingdom (UK) Confidential Enquires into Maternal Deaths". Seminars in Perinatology. 36 (1): 19–26. doi:10.1053/j.semperi.2011.09.005. ISSN 0146-0005. PMID 22280861. Wikidata Q37978987.
- Gwyneth Lewis (1 January 2003). "Beyond the numbers: reviewing maternal deaths and complications to make pregnancy safer". British Medical Bulletin. 67: 27–37. doi:10.1093/bmb/ldg009. ISSN 0007-1420. PMID 14711752. Wikidata Q34288602.
- Marian Knight; William M. Callaghan; Cynthia Berg; et al. (April 2010). "Trends in Postpartum Hemorrhage in High Resource Countries: A Review and Recommendations From the International Postpartum Hemorrhage Collaborative Group". Obstetrical & Gynecological Survey. 65 (4): 211–212. doi:10.1097/01.ogx.0000371705.17102.c4. ISSN 0029-7828. Wikidata Q54968055.
- Gwyneth Lewis (1 September 2008). "Maternal mortality in the developing world: why do mothers really die?". Obstetric medicine. 1 (1): 2–6. doi:10.1258/om.2008.080019. ISSN 1753-495X. PMC 5010106. PMID 27630738. Wikidata Q30392965.
