= Da Vinci Academy =

Location
- St Andrew's View; Breadsall, Derby, Derbyshire, DE21 4ET; England; 52.9405°N 1.4446°W

Information
- Type: Academy
- Established: 1988
- Local authority: Derby
- Trust: LEAD Academy Trust
- Department for Education URN: 144066 Tables
- Ofsted: Reports
- Head Teacher: Jayne Scattergood
- Gender: Coeducational
- Age: 11 to 16
- Website: https://www.davinciacademy.co.uk/

Da Vinci Academy is a co-educational secondary school located in Derby, Derbyshire, England.

The school originally opened in 1988 as High View Community Education Centre. It also became known as High View School and Technology Centre and High View Technology Centre. The school was formally closed and replaced by da Vinci Community College in September 2004 and moved into new buildings in 2006.

In January 2012, the school became a co-operative - "owned" by the school's pupils, parents, teachers, and the community. As a foundation school, da Vinci Community College was administered by Derby City Council, the University of Derby, Derby College, the Workers' Educational Association and the Midlands Co-operative Society. In May 2017 da Vinci Community School converted to academy status and was renamed Da Vinci Academy. The school is now sponsored by the LEAD Academy Trust.
