= Roy Clark (police officer) =

Scottish politic administrator

Roy Clark CBE QPM is a former Metropolitan Police Deputy Assistant Commissioner and head of Scotland Yard's Anti-Corruption Squad. Upon retiring from the Metropolitan Police, Clark became Director of Crimestoppers UK, then Director of Investigations at the Independent Police Complaints Commission. He was the Director of Criminal Investigations for HM Revenue and Customs from its formation in 2005 until 2011.

Clark was appointed Commander of the Order of the British Empire (CBE) in the 2009 Birthday Honours.
