= Janetta Douglas =

Janetta Douglas, née Smith, MBE is a Papua New Guinean charity worker.

In the late 1960s, she was "a young teacher in Madang", where she "encouraged the women to continue to make pots, assisted with marketing to surrounding villages and to Australia", and helped stimulate a "tourist trade in pottery".

Douglas is the author of a book on Tourism in Papua New Guinea (Institute of Papua New Guinea Studies, Port Moresby, 1975).

Dame Carol Kidu has described her as an "unsung hero", and said that "without people like Janetta Douglas, the disability data for Moresby South would not be being collected".

In June 2009, she was made a Memder of the Order of the British Empire by the Queen of Papua New Guinea, Elizabeth II, for "service to commerce and charities, especially through helping people living with disabilities".
