= Connirae Andreas =

American psychotherapist

- Born: 1953 (age 72–73); Hillsboro, Kansas, United States
- Occupations: Writer, consultant, public speaker
- Known for: co-creator of neuro-linguistic programming (NLP)
- Spouse: Steve Andreas
- Website: conniraeandreas.com

Connirae Andreas is an American author and personal development trainer with a PhD in psychotherapy. She is best known for her earlier contributions within the field of Neuro-linguistic programming (NLP).

== Education ==
Connirae Andreas studied undergraduate psychology at Bethel College (1971–73) and the University of Kansas (1973–1975). Having won a Danforth Foundation Fellowship for graduate study she entered the PhD programme in clinical psychology at the University of Colorado (Boulder) in 1975, and completed her MA in 1979. She was awarded a PhD in psychotherapy from National Christian University (NCU) in 1989.

== Career ==
Connirae Andreas, along with her partner and future husband Steve Andreas, was introduced to NLP in 1977, while she was still a postgraduate student. The couple began teaching it themselves in early 1978. In 1979 they established NLP Comprehensive, based in Colorado, to organise NLP trainings.

They went on to publish multiple books on NLP through Real People Press, a publishing house established by Steve Andreas. Their early NLP books, credited with bringing the new field of NLP into mainstream awareness, were produced from transcripts of workshops taught by the field's founders, Richard Bandler and John Grinder, including Frogs into Princes (1979). The Andreases went on to edit three further books of this kind, Trance-Formations (1981), Reframing (1982), and Using Your Brain — for a Change (1985), before starting to publish their own original works, Change Your Mind — and Keep the Change (1987) and Heart of the Mind (1989).

In their 2013 book, The Clinical Effectiveness of Neurolinguistic Programming: A Critical Appraisal, Lisa Wake, Richard Gray, and Frank Bourke described Connirae and her husband Steve as "two of the founding lights in NLP and its most well-known interpreters."

Later, Connirae Andreas became the originator of Core Transformation, a brief therapy approach to emotional and spiritual healing, in which limitations and unwanted feelings are used as a pathway to profound inner states such as peace, oneness, and presence. Andreas taught that process with her sister and co-author, Tamara Andreas. In a 2025 interview with Roni F. Matar, Andreas described her encounter with Milton H. Erickson in 1979 as the pivotal event that eventually led her to develop Core Transformation, recounting that during Erickson's workshop she experienced an unexpected shift in consciousness that she spent years attempting to recreate and systematise.

Andreas has developed other personal transformation methods, including Aligning Perceptual Positions, first published in Anchor Point in 1991 in an article co-authored with Tamara Andreas, which has since been cited in academic literature on phenomenological interview methods, and again together with Steve Andreas, Eye Movement Integration Therapy. Andreas has been an invited speaker at multiple Milton H. Erickson Foundation conferences, presenting at the Foundation’s Brief Therapy Congress in 2015 and 2016, including a clinical demonstration of Core Transformation and a presentation titled Metaphors of Movement. She is a honorary fellow of the Association for Neuro Linguistic Programming.

After a personal health crisis resulting in a longer pause in public teaching, and her return to it in 2012, Andreas has led live in-person Wholeness Work trainings internationally, 2024 in Amsterdam, 2025 in Wageningen and 2026 in Cologne, Germany. Beyond that, the method is taught by a network of certified trainers. The European Association for The Wholeness Work (EATWW e. V.), founded in Vienna in 2018, coordinates coach and trainer certification in Europe.

=== The Wholeness Work ===
In recent years, Andreas developed "The Wholeness Work," a psychological / spiritual modeling process centered on the integration of the "ego-structure" or the felt sense of the "I.". The method uses a structured protocol to dissolve boundaries between the self and experience to resolve emotional and behavioral issues. The process has been presented at the 13th Milton H. Erickson Foundation Congress, where it was described as a method for achieving outcomes similar to mindfulness through a precise experiential process.

== Selected publications ==
=== Authored books ===
- Andreas, Connirae; Andreas, Tamara (1994). Core transformation : reaching the wellspring within. Moab, Utah: Real People Press. ISBN 0-911226-32-X.
  - Reprint: Andreas, Connirae (1994). Core transformation : reaching the wellspring within. Tamara Andreas. Moab, Utah: Real People Press. ISBN 0-911226-32-X. OCLC 29182466.
  - German Translation: Andreas, Connirae (1995). Der Weg zur inneren Quelle Core-Transformation in der Praxis; neue Dimensionen des NLP. Tamara Andreas. Paderborn. ISBN 9783873871403. OCLC 75605849.
- Andreas, Connirae & Steve Andreas, Change your mind—and keep the change, advanced NLP submodalities interventions, Boulder, CO : Real People Press, 1987, ISBN 0-911226-28-1
- Andreas, Connirae & Steve Andreas, Heart of the mind: engaging your inner power to change with neuro-linguistic programming, Boulder, CO : Real People Press, 1989, ISBN 0-911226-30-3
  - Fourth most popular non-fiction book in Lithuania in 2020
  - Also in French
- Coming to Wholeness. How to Awaken and Live with Ease. Real People Press. 2018. ISBN 978-0-911226-51-5.
  - Auf dem Weg zur Ganzheit. Mit der Wholeness-Methode zur persönlichen Transformation (in German). Translated by Sadler, Christine. Paderborn: Junfermann. 2020. ISBN 978-3-955-71900-5.
- The Wholeness Work. Essential Guide. Level I: Healing & Awakening. Real People Press. 2024. ISBN 978-0-911226-78-2.

=== Edited books ===
- Bandler, Richard; Andreas, Connirae; Andreas, Steve (1985). Using your brain – for a change. Moab, Utah: Real People Press. ISBN 978-0-911226-27-0.
- Bandler, Richard; Grinder, John; Andreas, Steve; Andreas, Connirae (1982). Reframing. Neuro-linguistic Programming and the Transformation of Meaning. Moab, Utah: Real People Press. ISBN 978-0-911226-25-6.
- Bandler, Richard; Grinder, John; Andreas, Connirae (1981). Trance-Formations. Neuro-Linguistic Programming and the Structure of Hypnosis. Moab, Utah: Real People Press. ISBN 978-0-911226-23-2.

=== Book chapters ===
- Claire, Claire, ed. (2009). "Aligning Perceptual Positions: A New Distinction in NLP". Ten Years of Viewing Within: The Legacy of Francisco Varela. Charlottesville, VA: Imprint Academic. pp. 217–230. ISBN 978-1845401740.
- Andreas, Tamara; Andreas, Connirae (1998). "Core Transformation. A Brief Therapy Approach to Emotional and Spiritual Healing". In Hoyt, Michael F. (ed.). Constructive Therapies. Vol. 2. New York, London: The Guilford Press. pp. 275–305. ISBN 978-1-572-30424-6.
- Andreas, Steve; Andreas, Connirae (1992). "Neuro-linguistic programming". In Budman, Simon H.; Hoyt, Michael F.; Friedman, Steven (eds.). The first session in brief therapy. New York, London: The Guilford Press. pp. 14–35. ISBN 978-0898621389.

== Podcasts ==
- Harris, Jordan (June 24, 2019). "EP 25: Connirae Andreas and Awakening the Wisdom Within". The Informed Simplicity Project (Podcast). podcasts.apple.com.
- The Essential Coaching Skills Podcast (July 20, 2020). "Episode 7: Creator of Core Transformation Connirae Andreas". Listen Notes (Podcast).
