= Steve Andreas =

American psychotherapist and author

- Born: 1935
- Died: September 7, 2018 (aged 82–83); Colorado, U.S.
- Education: BA in Chemistry at Caltech in 1957 MA in Psychology at Brandeis University in 1961
- Spouse: Connirae Andreas
- Website: www.steveandreas.com

Steve Andreas (born John O. Stevens; 1935 – September 7, 2018) was an American psychotherapist and author specializing in Neuro-linguistic programming.

Steve Andreas was the son of Barry Stevens, a writer and gestalt therapist. He founded Real People Press, a publisher of works on psychology and personal change in 1967, in order to publish a book by Carl Rogers and Barry Stevens entitled Person to Person.

Andreas got a BA in chemistry from Caltech in 1957, then worked as a chemist at Shell. Afterwards he went to graduate school at Brandeis University under Abraham Maslow and received an MA degree in psychology in 1961. After working as an analytical chemist for the U.S. Bureau of Mines for a year, he got a junior college teaching credential, and taught psychology and social science at Diablo Valley College in Pleasant Hill CA from 1962 to 1970.

He was introduced to Gestalt therapy in 1967 by Fritz Perls, and edited his books, Gestalt Therapy Verbatim and In and Out the Garbage Pail. He wrote Awareness, a book of exercises based on Gestalt Therapy in 1971. In 1971 he retired from teaching to focus on running Real People Press and setting up a small experimental community based on the principles of his book.

He was responsible for the compilation of Gestalt Therapy Verbatim, the media event that brought Gestalt therapy to public attention in the late 1960s. He was also the editor of the 1973 book Embrace Tiger, Return to Mountain: The Essence of Tai Chi by Chungliang Al Huang, for which he and Barry Stevens wrote the preface.

He became interested in Neuro-linguistic programming in 1977 and was active in the field thereafter. In 1979 Steve Andreas and his third wife Connirae Andreas established NLP of Colorado, now known as NLP Comprehensive, to develop the training arm of their business. Together they developed Eye movement Integration (EMI) several years before Danie Beauliau popularized it. They transferred ownership of NLP Comprehensive to Tom Dotz in 1998.

He was on the board of trustees of the Research & Recognition project for scientific research of NLP interventions. The project started by focusing on running trials for a version of the NLP Fast Phobia Cure that they standardized under the name Reconsolidation of Traumatic Memories. In multiple clinical trials they reported a positive effect of the procedure for veterans who suffered from PTSD. Andreas died on September 7, 2018.

== Books and publications ==
Richard Bandler and John Grinder titles edited by Steve and Connirae Andreas which are well known in the NLP field include:

- Frogs Into Princes (Bandler & Grinder, 1979)
- Trance-Formations (Grinder & Bandler, 1981)
- Reframing (Bandler and Grinder, 1982)
- Using Your Brain for a Change (Bandler, 1985)

Titles authored by Steve and Connirae Andreas include

- Change Your Mind and Keep the Change (1987)
- Heart of the Mind (1989)
- Core Transformation (Connirae & Tamara Andreas, 1994).

Steve Andreas's more recent works include

- Virginia Satir: The Patterns of Her Magic (1991)
- NLP: The New Technology of Achievement (Charles Faulkner, Kelly Gerling, Tim Hallbom, Robert McDonald, Gerry Schmidt, Suzi Smith ) (1994)
- Transforming Your Self (2002)
- Six Blind Elephants, Volumes I & II (2006)
- Transforming Negative Self-Talk (2012)
- MORE Transforming Negative Self-Talk (2014)
