= Methods of neuro-linguistic programming =

Pseudo-scientific intellectual framework

The methods of neuro-linguistic programming are the specific techniques used to perform and teach neuro-linguistic programming, which teaches that people are only able to directly perceive a small part of the world using their conscious awareness, and that this view of the world is filtered by experience, beliefs, values, assumptions, and biological sensory systems. NLP argues that people act and feel based on their perception of the world and how they feel about that world they subjectively experience.

NLP claims that language and behaviors (whether functional or dysfunctional) are highly structured, and that this structure can be 'modeled' or copied into a reproducible form. Using NLP a person can 'model' the more successful parts of their own behavior in order to reproduce it in areas where they are less successful or 'model' another person to effect belief and behavior changes to improve functioning. If someone excels in some activity, it can be learned how specifically they do it by observing certain important details of their behavior. NLP embodies several techniques, including hypnotic techniques, which proponents claim can affect changes in the way people think, learn and communicate.

== Internal 'maps' of the world ==
NLP claims that our mind-body (neuro) and what we say (language) all interact together to form our perceptions of the world, or maps (programming) and that said map of the world determines feelings and behavior.

As an approach to personal development or therapy it claims that people create their own internal 'map' or world, recognizing unhelpful or destructive patterns of thinking based on impoverished maps of the world, then modifying or replacing these patterns with more useful or helpful ones. There is also an emphasis on ways to change internal representations or maps of the world with the intent of increasing behavioral flexibility.

== Modeling ==
"Modeling" in NLP is the process of adopting the behaviors, language, strategies and beliefs of another person or exemplar in order to 'build a model of what they do. The original models were: Milton Erickson (hypnotherapy), Virginia Satir (family therapy), and Fritz Perls (gestalt therapy). NLP modeling methods are designed to unconsciously assimilate the tacit knowledge to learn what the master is doing of which the master is not aware. As an approach to learning it can involve modeling exceptional people. As Bandler and Grinder state "the function of NLP modeling is to arrive at descriptions which are useful." Einspruch & Forman 1985 state that "when modeling another person the modeler suspends his or her own beliefs and adopts the structure of the physiology, language, strategies, and beliefs of the person being modeled. After the modeler is capable of behaviorally reproducing the patterns (of behavior, communication, and behavioral outcomes) of the one being modeled, a process occurs in which the modeler modifies and readopts his or her own belief system while also integrating the beliefs of the one who was modeled." Modeling is not confined to therapy, but can be, and is, applied to a broad range of human learning. Another aspect of modeling is understanding the patterns of one's own behaviors in order to 'model' the more successful parts of oneself.

== Representational systems ==
The notion that experience is processed by the sensory systems or representational systems, was incorporated into NLP from psychology and gestalt therapy shortly after its creation. This teaches that people perceive the world through the senses and store the information from the senses in the mind. Memories are closely linked to sensory experience. When people are processing information they see images and hear sounds and voices and process this with internally created feelings. Some representations are within conscious awareness but information is largely processed at the unconscious level. When involved in any task, such as making conversation, describing a problem in therapy, reading a book, kicking a ball or riding a horse, their representational systems, consisting of images, sounds, feelings (and possibly smell and taste) are being activated at the same time. Moreover, the way representational systems are organised and the links between them impact on behavioral performance. Many NLP techniques rely on interrupting maladaptive patterns and replacing them with more positive and creative thought patterns which will in turn impact on behavior.

Preferred representational systems

Originally, NLP taught that most people had an internal preferred representational system (PRS) and preferred to process information primarily in one sensory modality. The practitioner could ascertain this from external cues such as the direction of eye movements, posture, breathing, voice tone and the use of sensory-based predicates. If a person repeatedly used predicates such as "I can see a bright future for myself", the words "see" and "bright" would be considered visual predicates. In contrast "I can feel that we will be comfortable" would be considered primarily kinesthetic because of the predicates "feel" and "comfortable". These verbal cues could also be coupled with posture changes, skin color or breathing shifts. The theory was that the practitioner by matching and working within the preferred representational system could achieve better communication with the client and hence swifter and more effective results. Many trainings and standard works still teach PRS

Although there is some research that supports the notion that eye movements can indicate visual and auditory (but not kinesthetic) components of thought in that moment, the existence of a preferred representational system ascertainable from external cues (an important part of original NLP theory) was discounted by research in the 1980s.

Submodalities

Submodalities are the fine details of representational systems. For example, the submodalities of sight include light/dark, colour/monochrome, sharp/blurred. Submodalities involve the relative size, location, brightness of internal images, the volume and direction of internal voices and sounds, and the location, texture, and movement of internally created sensations. A typical change process may involve manipulating the submodalities of internal representations. For example, someone may see their future as 'dark and cloudy' with associated emotions, but would seek through NLP to perceive, and feel it, as 'light and clear'. Other training exercises develop a person's ability to move around internal images, change the quality of sounds and find out how these affect the intensity of internal feelings or other submodalities. Although NLP did not discover submodalities, it appears that the proponents of NLP may have been the first to systematically use manipulation of submodalities for therapeutic or personal development purposes, particularly phobias, compulsions and addictions.

== Meta-programs ==
Neuro-linguistic programming (NLP) uses the term 'meta-programs' specifically to indicate general, pervasive and usually habitual patterns used by an individual across a wide range of situations. Examples of NLP meta-programs include the preference for overview or detail, the preference for where to place one's attention during conversation, habitual linguistic patterns and body language, and so on.

Related concepts in other disciplines are known as cognitive styles or thinking styles.

In NLP, the term programs is used as a synonym for strategy, which are specific sequences of mental steps, mostly indicated by their representational activity (using VAKOG), leading to a behavioral outcome. In the entry for the term strategy in their encyclopedia, Robert Dilts & Judith Delozier explicitly refer to the mind as computer metaphor:

A strategy is like a program in a computer. It tells you what to do with the information you are getting, and like a computer program, you can use the same strategy to process a lot of different kinds of information.

In their encyclopedia, Dilts and Delozier then define metaprograms as

[programs] which guide and direct other thought processes. Specifically they define common or typical patterns in the strategies or thinking styles of a particular individual, group or culture.

== Techniques ==
=== Anchoring ===
NLP teaches that we constantly make "anchors" (classical conditioning) between what we see, hear and feel; and our emotional states. While in an emotional state if a person is exposed to a unique stimulus (sight, sound or touch), then a connection is made between the emotion and the unique stimulus. If the unique stimulus occurs again, the emotional state will then be triggered. NLP teaches that anchors (such as a particular touch associated with a memory or state) can be deliberately created and triggered to help people access 'resourceful' or other target states.

=== Future pacing ===
A technique of asking a person to imagine doing something in the future and monitoring their reactions. It is typically used to check that a change process has been successful, by observing body language when the person imagines being in a difficult situation before and after an intervention. If the body language is the same, then the intervention has not been successful.

=== Swish ===
The swish pattern is a process that is designed to disrupt a pattern of thought from one that used to lead to an unwanted behavior to one that leads to a desired behavior. This involves visualizing a 'cue' which leads into the unwanted behavior, such as a smokers hand moving towards the face with a cigarette in it, and reprogramming the mind to 'switch' to a visualization of the desired outcome, such as a healthy-looking person, energetic and fit. In addition to visualization, auditory sound effects are often imagined to enhance the experience.

=== Reframing ===
Another technique, "reframing" functions through "changing the way you perceive an event and so changing the meaning. When the meaning changes, responses and behaviors will also change. Reframing with language allows you to see the world in a different way and this changes the meaning. Reframing is the basis of jokes, myths, legends, fairy tales and most creative ways of thinking." There are examples in children's literature; for example, the fictional Pollyanna would play The Glad Game whenever she felt down about life, to remind herself of the things that she could do, and not worry about the things she couldn't. Alice Mills also says that this occurs in Hans Christian Andersen's story where, to the surprise of the ugly duckling, the beautiful creatures welcome and accept him; gazing at his reflection, he sees that he too is a swan. Reframing is common to a number of therapies and is not original to NLP.

=== Well-formed outcome ===
In NLP this is one of a number of 'frames' wherein the desired state is considered as to its achievability and effect if achieved. A positive outcome must be defined by the client for their own use, be within the clients power to achieve, retain the positive products of the unwanted behaviors and produce an outcome that is appropriate for all circumstances.

=== VK/D ===
VK/D stands for 'Visual/Kinesthetic Dissociation'. This is a technique designed to eliminate bad feelings associated with past events by re-running (like a film, sometimes in reverse) an associated memory in a dissociated state. It combines elements of Ericksonian techniques, spatial sorting processes from Fritz Perls, reframing and 'changing history' techniques.

Metaphor

Largely derived from the ideas of Bateson and the techniques of Erickson, 'metaphor' in NLP ranges from simple figures of speech to allegories and stories. It tends to be used in conjunction with the skills of the Milton model to create a story which operates on many levels with the intention of communicating with the unconscious and to find and challenge basic assumptions.

State management

Sometimes called state control, is a neuro-linguistic programming (NLP) technique involving actively trying to control the emotional and mental state of an individual. One method to actively achieve state management anchoring where an individual associates a particular physical stimulus.

=== Covert hypnosis ===
Covert hypnosis is purportedly a method of using language patterns to hypnotise or persuade other people. Referred to as "sleight of mouth" by Robert Dilts. building off the phrase "sleight of hand", which refers to a magician's skills in making things happen which appear impossible.
