= Representational systems (NLP) =

Pseudoscientific neuro-linguistic model

Representational systems (also abbreviated to VAKOG) is a postulated model from neuro-linguistic programming, a collection of models and methods regarding how the human mind processes and stores information. The central idea of this model is that experience is represented in the mind in sensorial terms, i.e. in terms of the putative five senses, qualia.

According to Bandler and Grinder our chosen words, phrases and sentences are indicative of our referencing of each of the representational systems. So for example the words "black", "clear", "spiral" and "image" reference the visual representation system; similarly the words "tinkling", "silent", "squeal" and "blast" reference the auditory representation system. Bandler and Grinder also propose that ostensibly metaphorical or figurative language indicates a reference to a representational system such that it is actually literal. For example, the comment "I see what you're saying" is taken to indicate a visual representation.

Further, Bandler and Grinder claim that each person has a "most highly valued" (now commonly termed preferred) representational system in which they are more able to vividly create an experience (in their mind) in terms of that representational system, tend to use that representational system more often than the others, and have more distinctions available in that representation system than the others. So for example a person that most highly values their visual representation system is able to easily and vividly visualise things, and has a tendency to do this more often than recreating sounds, feelings, etc.

Representational systems are one of the foundational ideas of NLP and form the basis of many NLP techniques and methods.

== Representational systems within NLP ==
"At the core of NLP is the belief that, when people are engaged in activities, they are also making use of a representational system; that is, they are using some internal representation of the materials they are involved with, such as a conversation, a rifle shot, a spelling task. These representations can be visual, auditory, kinesthetic, or involve the other senses. In addition, a person may be creating a representation or recalling one. For example, a person asked to spell a word may visualize that word printed on a piece of paper, may hear it being sounded out, or may construct the spelling from the application of a series of logical rules." Daniel Druckman (Ed.) (1988), Enhancing Human Performance: Issues, Theories, and Techniques (pp. 138–139)

For many practical purposes, according to NLP, mental processing of events and memories can be treated as if performed by the five senses. For example, Albert Einstein credited his discovery of special relativity to a mental visualization strategy of "sitting on the end of a ray of light", and many people as part of decision-making talk to themselves in their heads.

The manner in which this is done, and the effectiveness of the mental strategy employed, is stated by NLP to play a critical part in the way mental processing takes place. This observation led to the concept of a preferred representational system, the classification of people into fixed visual, auditory or kinesthetic stereotypes. This idea was later discredited and dropped within NLP by the early 1980s, in favor of the understanding that most people use all of their senses (whether consciously or unconsciously), and that whilst one system may seem to dominate, this is often contextualized – globally there is a balance that dynamically varies according to circumstance and mood.

NLP asserts that for most circumstances and most people, three of the five sensory based modes seem to dominate in mental processing:

- visual thoughts – sight, mental imagery, spatial awareness
- auditory (or linguistic) thoughts – sound, speech, dialog, white noise
- kinesthetic (or proprioceptive) sense – somatic feelings in the body, temperature, pressure, and also emotion.

The other two senses, gustatory (taste) and olfactory (smell), which are closely associated, often seem to be less significant in general mental processing, and are often considered jointly as one.

For this reason, one often sees the term VAK in NLP reference texts, to signify these three primary representational systems, as well as the term 4-tuple (or VAKOG) if the author wishes to include all senses including taste/smell. The same term is also known as First Access (John Grinder), or primary experience (Freud).

=== Notation and strategies ===
In documenting mental strategies and processing by the senses, NLP practitioners often use a simple shorthand for different modalities, with a letter indicating the representation system concerned, and often, a superscript to indicate how that system is being used. Three key aspects are commonly notated: The representation system being used (visual/V, auditory/A, kinesthetic/K, and occasionally, O/G), whether the direction of attention is internal ^{(i)} or external ^{(e)}, and whether the event is a recollection of an actual past event ^{(r)} or construction of an imaginary event ^{(c)}. Due to its importance in human cognitive processing, auditory internal dialogue, or talking in one's head, has its own shorthand: A^{id}.

Putting these together, this is a very simplified example of some steps which might actually be involved in replying to a simple question such as "Do you like that dress?". The table below is useful for teaching how to identify and access each representational system in context:

Step	Activity	Notation	What it's being used for
1	auditory external	A^{e}	Hear the question
2	visual internal	V^{i}	picture to oneself the meaning of the question
3	visual external	V^{e}	look at the dress
4	visual internal constructed	V^{ic}	create a mental image of the dress worn by the person
5	kinesthetic internal	K^{i}	get an internal feeling from looking at it
6	auditory internal dialog	A^{id}	ask oneself 'Do I like that impression?'
7	auditory external	A^{e}	reply

Logically, these or similar steps must take place somewhere in consciousness in order to cognitively make sense of the question and answer it. A sequence of this kind is known in NLP as a strategy – in this case, a functional outline of the strategy used by the mind in answering that question. In a similar way, the process leading to a panic attack of the form "I see the clock, ask myself where the kids are, imagine everything that could be happening and feel scared" might be notated as having a subjective structure: V^{e} → A^{id} → V^{ic} → K^{i}, signifying that an external sight leads to internal dialog (a question), followed by internal and constructed images, leading to a feeling.

Generally speaking, most human perceptual and cognitive processing occurs before conscious awareness. For example, few people would ordinarily be aware that between question and even considering an answer, there must be steps in which the mind interprets and contextualizes the question itself, and steps which explore various possible strategies to be used to obtain an answer and select one to be followed. The mental occurrence of these steps is often identified by deduction following skilled observation, or by careful inquiry, although their presence is usually self-apparent to the person concerned once noticed.

=== Sensory predicates and eye accessing cues ===
Grinder and Bandler believed they identified pattern of relationship between the sensory-based language people use in general conversation, and for example, their eye movement (known as eye accessing cues).

A common (but not universal) style of processing in the West is shown in the attached chart, where eye flickers in specific directions often seem to tie into specific kinds of internal (mental) processing.

NLP also suggests that sometimes (again not universally) such processing is associated with sensory word use; for example, a person asked what they liked about the beach, may flick their eyes briefly in some characteristic direction (visual memory access, often upwards) and then also use words that describe it in a visual sense ("The sea looked lovely", and so on). Likewise asked about a problem, someone may look in a different direction for a while (kinesthetic access, typically downwards) and then look puzzled and say "I just can't seem to get a grip on things". Taken together, NLP suggests such eye accessing cues (1) are idiosyncratic and habitual for each person, and (2) may form significant clues as to how a person is processing or representing a problem to themselves unconsciously.

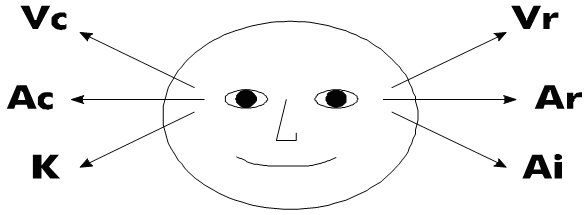
The most common arrangement for eye accessing cues in a right-handed person. Note: – NLP does not say it is 'always' this way, but rather that one should check whether reliable correlations seem to exist for an individual, and if so what they are

Common (but not universal) Western layout of eye accessing cues:

- Upwards (left/right) – Visual (V) – "I can imagine the big picture"
- Level (left/right) – Auditory (A) – "Let's tone down the discussion"
- Down-right—Kinesthetic (K) – "to grasp a concept" or "to gather you've understood."
- Down-left Auditory internal dialogue (A^{id}) – talking to oneself inside

Eye movement to the left or right for many people seems to indicate if a memory was recalled or constructed. Thus remembering an actual image (V^{r}) is associated more with up-left, whilst imagining one's dream home (V^{c}) tends (again not universally) to be more associated with up-right.

=== Subjective awareness ===
When we think about the world, or about our past experiences, we represent those things inside our heads. For example, think about the holiday you went on last year. Did you see a picture of where you went, tell yourself a story about what you did, feel the sun on your back and the wind in your hair? Can you bring to mind the smell of your favourite flower or the taste of a favourite meal??

The use of the various modalities can be identified based by learning to respond to subtle shifts in breathing, body posture, accessing cues, gestures, eye movement and language patterns such as sensory predicates.

=== Uses ===
NLP's interest in the senses is not so much in their role as bridges to the outside world, but in their role as internal channels for cognitive processing and interpretation. In an NLP perspective, it is not very important per se whether a person sees or hears some memory. By contrast, NLP views it as potentially of great importance for the same person, to discover that some auditory sounds presented almost out of consciousness along with the memory, may be how the brain presents to consciousness, and how consciousness knows, whether this is a heart-warming pleasant memory, or a fearsome phobic one.

Representational systems are also relevant since some tasks are better performed within one representational system than by another. For example, within education, spelling is better learned by children who have unconsciously used a strategy of visualization, than an unconscious strategy of phonetically "sounding out". When taught to visualize, previously poor spellers can indeed be taught to improve. NLP proponents also found that pacing and leading the various cues tended to build rapport, and allowed people to communicate more effectively. Certain studies suggest that using similar representational systems to another person can help build rapport whilst other studies have found that merely mimicking or doing so in isolation is perceived negatively.

Skinner and Stephens (2003) explored the use of the model of representational systems in television marketing and communications.

Some exercises in NLP training involve learning how to observe and respond to the various cues in real time.

== The preferred representational system (PRS) ==
Originally NLP taught that people preferred one representational system over another. People could be stuck by thinking about a problem in their "preferred representational system" (PRS). Some took this idea further and categorised people as auditory, kinesthetic, and visual thinkers (see also: learning styles). It was claimed that swifter and more effective results could be achieved by matching this preferred system. Although there is some research that supports the notion that eye movement can indicate visual and auditory (but not kinesthetic) components of thought in that moment, the existence of a preferred representational system ascertainable from external cues (an important part of original NLP theory) was discounted by research in the 1980s. Some still believe the PRS model to be important for enhancing rapport and influence. Others have de-emphasized its relevance and instead emphasize that people constantly use all representational systems. In particular, new code emphasizes individual calibration and sensory acuity, precluding such a rigidly specified model as the one described above. Responding directly to sensory experience requires an immediacy which respects the importance of context. John Grinder has stated that a representational system diagnosis lasts about 30 seconds.

In a review of research findings, Sharpley (1987) found little support for individuals to have a "preferred" representational system (PRS), whether in the choice of words or direction of eye movement, and the concept of a preferred representation system (PRS). Similarly, The National Research Committee found little support for the influence of PRS as presented in early descriptions of NLP, Frogs into Princes (1979) and Structure of Magic (1975). However, "at a meeting with Richard Bandler in Santa Cruz, California, on July 9, 1986, the [National Research Committee] influence subcommittee... was informed that PRS was no longer considered an important component of NLP. He said that NLP had been revised." (p. 140) The NLP developers, Robert Dilts et al. (1980) proposed that eye movement (and sometimes bodily gesture) correspond to accessing cues for representations systems, and connected it to specific sides in the brain.

== See also ==
- Neuro-linguistic programming
- Sensory systems
- Mental models
- Mental imagery
- Auditory imagery
- Learning styles
