= The Structure of Magic =

1970s book series

- The Structure of Magic I: A Book About Language and Therapy; The Structure of Magic II: A Book About Communication and Change
- Author: Richard Bandler; John Grinder
- Country: United States
- Language: English
- Discipline: Communication
- Publisher: Science and Behavior Books
- Published: 1975–1976
- No. of books: 2

The Structure of Magic is a two-volume book series (1975, 1976) by John Grinder and Richard Bandler, co-founders of neuro-linguistic programming (NLP), which is considered a pseudoscience. The series explores how humans construct internal models of the world through language and nonverbal communication. They introduce a process of modeling, through which the authors sought to identify the replicable patterns of thought, language, and behavior modeled from "outstanding psychotherapists", namely Fritz Perls (Gestalt therapy) and Virginia Satir, a family systems therapist. The foreword to the first volume was written by Virginia Satir and the introduction by Gregory Bateson.

According to psychiatrist Robert S. Spitzer, after months of careful listening and transcribing Fritz Perls and Virginia Satir working with clients, Bandler began to incorporate the speech patterns and mannerisms of these therapists into his own communication. The Structure of Magic presents a formal model of linguistic patterns intended to make those patterns explicit and learnable.
