= Malminder Gill =

- Known for: Hypnotherapist and Author
- Website: www.malmindergill.com

Malminder Gill (born in Kent, United Kingdom) is a self-help author and holistic therapist from England.

== Career ==
Prior to starting her career in Hypnosis and Coaching, Gill worked in the Digital Industry focusing on the development and integration of digital in emerging markets.

In 2008 she started training in NLP (neuro-linguistic programming) Coaching in Buenos Aires, Argentina. She later became involved in Hypnosis and Life Coaching. Gill went on to practice Hypnotherapy at the established Harley Street Therapy Centre.

She has written a sleep book titled, Drift: Bedtime Stories for a Good Night's Sleep, published by Octopus Books, part of Hachette Livre. Gill regularly provides opinions and commentary on sleep and other areas for press such as the New York Times, Women's Health, and Glamour UK.

== Publications ==
=== Books ===
- Drift: Bedtime Stories for a Good Night's Sleep, Malminder Gill 2026

=== Studies ===
- Anatomy and Pathophysiology of Chronic Pain and the Impact of Hypnotherapy Malminder Gill 2017
