= Juan Poblete =

Juan Poblete is Professor of Latin American Literature and Cultural Studies at the University of California, Santa Cruz. Poblete began his career as a UCSC Assistant Professor in 1997. He is also the provost of Kresge College at UCSC and a Governing Board Member of the Latino Literary Cultures Project/Proyecto Culturas Literarias Latinas.

Poblete earned his Bachelor of Arts from the University of Chile and his Ph.D. from Duke University where he studied literary markets in Chile, the role subaltern readers play in influencing these markets, and the influence of cultural values on curricular choices in schools. One of Poblete's professors at Duke University was Argentine born Walter Mignolo who contributed to Poblete's Critical Latin American and Latino Studies.

Poblete's current research focuses on the 19th century Latin America and contemporary Latino culture. His research on the 19th century culture focuses on literature as a disciplinary discourse for the formation of national subjects, as a set of social practices, and as a product in the cultural market.

In addition, Poblete has written and researched various aspects of Latin American and Latino culture and experiences, with consideration to modern phenomenons including globalization and transnationalism. His studies on US Latinos and contemporary Chilean culture “participate in an effort to rethink Latin/o American Studies in a global framework. That is to say, capable of encompassing Latin America and the United States from interdisciplinary angles, which can do justice to the new complex cultural, social and political developments of a globalized Latin/o America.” Poblete's work has also often analyzed literary works (including comics, film, and literature) and their political or social role in the U.S./Latin America.

== Family ==
Juan Poblete is the son of Clara Garrido and Juan Poblete. He has four siblings: Haifa, Clara, Fernando, and Juan Claudio Poblete.

== Contributions to the field ==
=== Affect in a Post-Social Space ===
Poblete refers to the productivity of affect in a post-social space to describe a space dominated by fear and insecurity between different bodies and experiences as a result of both virtual and real, social/political, and economic circumstances. When Poblete uses the concept “post-social space,” he refers to societies where social security, pensions, health care, education, and other social services or rights are fully or partially privatized, leading to an increase in insecurity and anxiety within society. In this post-social context, it becomes easier and seems necessary for members of society to receive privatized services through the work afforded by racialized immigrants who work for less than the minimum wage. Therefore, a post-social space leads to both confidence in and interdependence between the migrant and non-migrant as well as fear, suspicion, and externalization of the “other.” Poblete explains how non-migrants need migrants for the services they offer in a post-social space, while migrants need non-migrants' employment for their own economic survival. Despite this interdependence, mutual effects including fear, anxiety, and resentment within conditions of exploitation lead to insecurity. As a result of this externalization or “otherization,” the migrant and non-migrant are both affected by a form of exclusion dominated by what becomes a subconscious form of fear and suspicion.

=== Production of in/visibility ===
In his focus on undocumented migrants, Poblete notes that more than a third of U.S. immigrants have been undocumented and a large percent has been Latino. Within this context, Poblete analyzes the dialectics of both visibility and invisibility affecting migrant populations in the United States. By in/visibility, Poblete refers to the ways migrants are invisibilized as political actors who have contributed to the economy of U.S., while they are visibilized as publics, audiences, and consumers. Their invisibilization as political actors therefore allows for their exploitation and vulnerability while their visibility as publics and consumers allows society to profit from them as a market, often representing them in a culturally homogeneous or stereotyped fashion.

== Latino Literary Cultures Project, UCSC ==
Juan Poblete is a governing board member of the Latino Literary Cultures Project/Proyecto Culturas Literarias Latinas. This project was formed in 1992 and connects faculty and graduate students from the University of California, Santa Cruz, with local, regional, and global groups to promote transnational and interdisciplinary research focused on the Americas. The project also promotes creative writing by and about Latin@s, sponsoring a major biennial conference and smaller events involving students, scholars, writers, reviewers, and librarians.

== Books & monographs ==
- 2018 Editor, New Approaches to Latin American Studies: Culture and Power New York: Routledge
- 2010 Co-editor (with Fernando Blanco), Desdén al infortunio: Sujeto, comunicación y público en la narrativa de Pedro Lemebel, Santiago: Cuarto Propio.
- 2009 Co-Editor (with Beatriz Gonzalez-Stephan), Andres Bello, Serie Críticas, Instituto Internacional de Literatura Iberoamericana.
- 2009 Co-Editor (with Héctor Fernández-L' Hoeste). Latin American Comics and The Graphic Construction of Cultural Identities, Palgrave.
- 2006 Editor, Cambio cultural y lectura de periódicos en el siglo XIX. (Cultural Change and the Reading of Periodicals in Nineteenth Century Latin America). A Special issue of Revista Iberoamericana, 214, January – March.
- 2003 Literatura chilena del siglo XIX: entre públicos lectores y figuras autoriales. (Nineteenth Century Chilean Literature: Between Reading Publics and Authorial Figures), Editorial Cuarto Propio, Chile.
- 2002 Editor with an Introduction: Critical Latin American and Latino Studies, University of Minnesota Press.

== Articles in professional journals ==
- 2011 “Los Cómics en un país tropical: Palomar de Gilbert Hernández”, Revista Iberoamericana, Vol. LXXVII, 234, January – March
- 2009 “Literatura, Mercado y nación: la literatura Latina en los Estados Unidos”, Revista de Crítica Literaria Latinoamericana, 69.
- 2009 “Crónica, ciudadanía y representación juvenil en Pedro Lemebel”, Nuevo Texto Crítico, XXII, 43–44.
- 2006 “Culture, Neoliberalism and Citizen Communication: the Case of Radio Tierra in Chile”, Global Media and Communication, vol. 2, 3.
- 2006 “U.S. Latino Studies in a Global Context: Social Imagination and the Production of In/visibility”, Work and Days, special issue on “Intellectual Intersections and Racial/Ethnic Crossings edited by Lingyan Yang, 47/48, vol.24.

== Chapters in books ==
- 2009 “Latinoamericanismo”, Diccionario de estudios culturales latinoamericanos, Monica Szurmuk and Robert McKee Irwin (editors), Mexico: Siglo XXI/ Instituto Mora.
- 2008 " Reading National Subjects," in Sara Castro-Klarén, editor, The Blackwell Companion to Latin American Culture and Literature.
- 2007 “The High Stakes Adventure of Reading (in) Kiss of the Spider Woman”, in Daniel Balderston and Francine Masiello, editors, Kiss of the Spider Woman, Modern Language Association, New York.
- 2007 “Crónica y ciudadanía en tiempos de globalización neoliberal: la escritura callejera” (Cronica and citizenship in the epoch of neoliberal globalization: street writing), in Graciela Falbo, editor, Tras las Huellas de una escritura en tránsito. La Crónica contemporánea en América Latina, Ediciones Al Margen/ Editorial de la Universidad de La Plata, Buenos Aires, Argentina.
- 2006 “Globalización, mediación cultural y literatura nacional” (Globalization, Cultural Mediation and National Literature), in Sanchez Prado, Ignacio, ed. América Latina en la “Literatura Mundial”, Instituto Internacional de Literatura Iberoamericana, Pittsburgh.

== Courses taught at University of California, Santa Cruz ==
- LALS 200 - Latin American and Latino Studies: An Interdisciplinary Graduate Introduction
- LTSP 130D - Latin/o American Testimonio
- LTSP 130F - US Latino/a Writing in Spanish, English and Spanglish
- LTSP 134G - Latin/o American Popular Culture
- LTSP 226 - Latin/o American Critical Theory in/of Globalization
- LTWL 109 - Topics Cultural Study (focus changes: reception theory, history of consumption, popular culture, globalization)
