= Sally Paine =

Sally Paine may refer to:

- Sally Pierone (10 February 1921 – 22 June 2018; née Paine), US artist and art director for the Marshall Plan
- S. C. M. Paine, US historian, author, and professor of strategy and policy at the U.S. Naval War College
- Sally Paine (May 15, 1744 – June 6, 1816; née Cobb), wife of Founding Father of the United States Robert Treat Paine
  - Their daughter (March 7, 1772 – January 26, 1823)
- Sally Peck (née Paine), wife of US Baptist missionary John Mason Peck
