= Frogs into Princes =

1979 neuro-linguistic programming book

Frogs into Princes: Neuro Linguistic Programming
- Author: John Grinder; Richard Bandler
- Language: English
- Subject: Communication
- Publisher: Real People Press
- Publication date: 1979
- Publication place: United States
- Pages: 194
- ISBN: 0-911226-19-2

Frogs into Princes: Neuro Linguistic Programming (1979) is a book by Richard Bandler and John Grinder, co-founders of neuro-linguistic programming (NLP), which is considered a pseudoscience. The book is one of several produced from transcripts of their seminars from the late 1970s and has sold more than 270,000 copies. The book offers examples of Bandler and Grinder employing various NLP techniques, including representational systems, rapport-building, anchoring, and reframing.

== Preferred Representational Systems (PRS) ==
An "eye accessing cue chart" as it appears as an example in Bandler & Grinder's Frogs into Princes (1979). The six arrow are claimed to indicate "visual construct", "visual recall", "auditory construct", "auditory recall", "kinesthetic" and "auditory internal dialogue".

The authors emphasized the role of representational systems in how individuals process the world. They noted that people tend to rely on visual, auditory, kinesthetic (feeling), olfactory (smell), or gustatory (taste) systems to represent experiences. The book delves into how to identify someone's preferred system, the significance of eye-accessing cues and importance of matching sensory-based language to enhance rapport and communication.

A review of research findings suggested many underlying principles presented in this book lacked rigorous scientific validation. Some of the underlying principles presented in this book, like the idea that people have preferred representation systems, the methods used to identify a client's preferred systems, or that therapists should match their clients' sensory predicates, are claimed to be crucial for effective communications and therapy. However, these principles lack solid support within the psychological research.

== Rewinding ==
Rewinding of traumatic memories was a concept first described by Bandler and Grinder in Frogs into Princes and further defined in Richard Bandler's book Using your brain—for a change. Limited studies have been performed based on the concept of rewinding, and they have not produced conclusive evidence towards the efficacy of rewinding as a therapeutic protocol.
