= Kresge College =

Residential colleges of University of California, Santa Cruz

Coordinates: 36.99844°N 122.06639°W

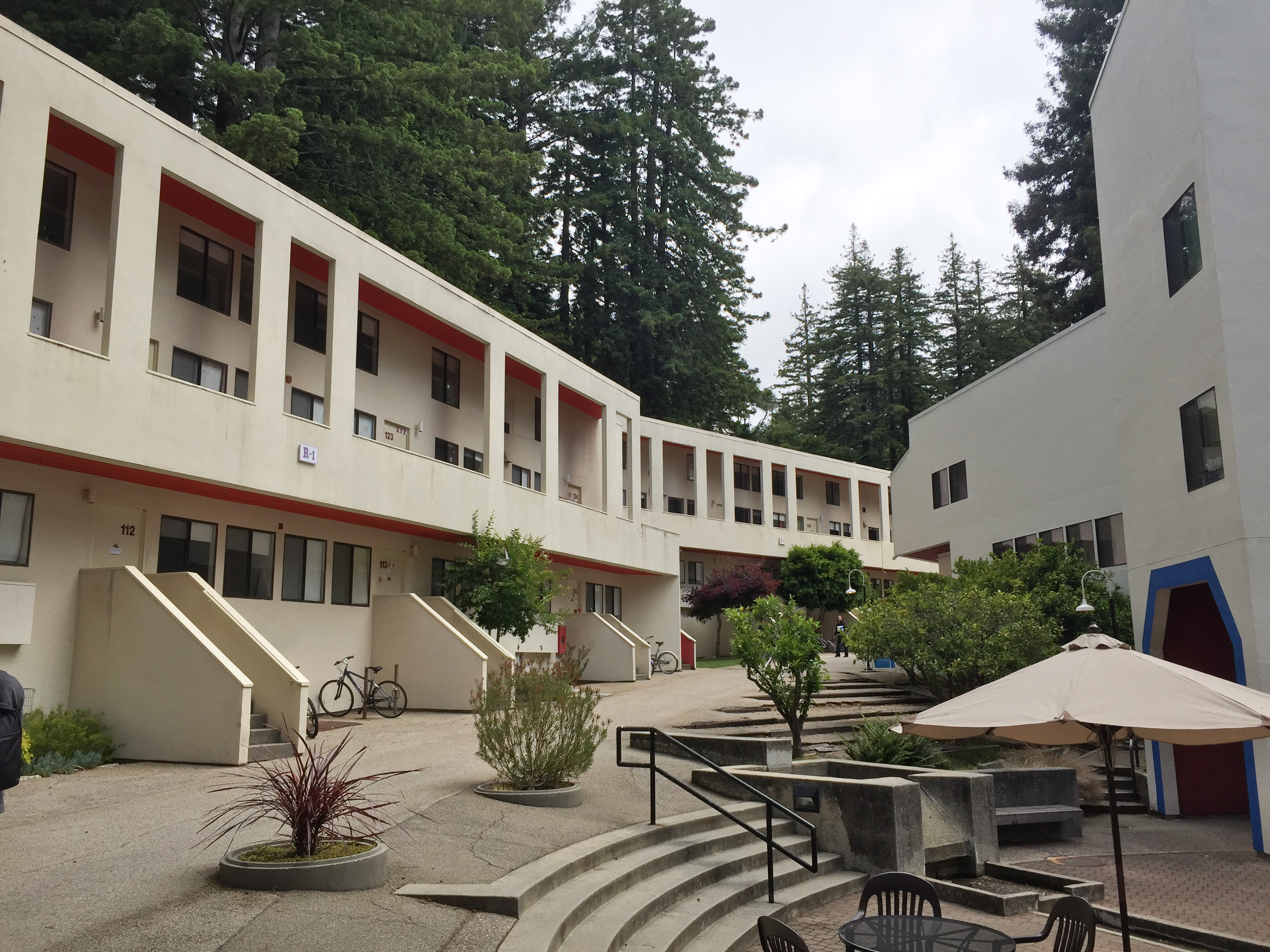
- Motto: "Independence, Creativity, Community"
- Type: Residential college
- Established: 1971
- Provost: Mayanthi Fernando
- Undergraduates: 1352
- Location: 1156 High Street, Santa Cruz, California
- Campus: Suburban/Sylvan
- Colors: Orange; Yellow; Red
- Mascot: KC Owl
- Website: kresge.ucsc.edu

Kresge College is one of the residential colleges that make up the University of California, Santa Cruz.

== Origin ==
Founded in 1971 and named after Sebastian Kresge, Kresge college is located on the western edge of the UCSC campus. Kresge is the sixth of ten colleges at UCSC, and originally one of the most experimental. The first provost of Kresge, Bob Edgar, had been strongly influenced by his experience in T-groups run by NTL Institute. He asked a T-group facilitator, psychologist Michael Kahn, to help him start the college. When they arrived at UCSC, they taught a course, Creating Kresge College, in which they and the students in it designed the college. Kresge was a participatory democracy, and students had extraordinary power in the early years. The college was run by two committees: Community Affairs and Academic Affairs. Any faculty member, student or staff member who wanted to be on these committees could be on them. Students' votes counted as much as the faculty or staff. These committees determined the budgets and hiring. They were also run by consensus. Early faculty members included Gregory Bateson, Philip Slater, John Grinder, and William Everson.

Graduates from the early days of Kresge College include Doug Foster and Richard Bandler.

== Architecture ==
The architecture of Kresge College is designed to resemble a residential area in Tuscany, and includes a piazzetta next to the college office and mail room. The informal quality of the space, especially the narrow street, was a reaction against the modernist skyscrapers of the previous generation of dormitory buildings.

Kresge students are offered the opportunity to create murals around Kresge to keep the College representative of its current age. There are approved mural areas on buildings R1, R3, R6, and R8.

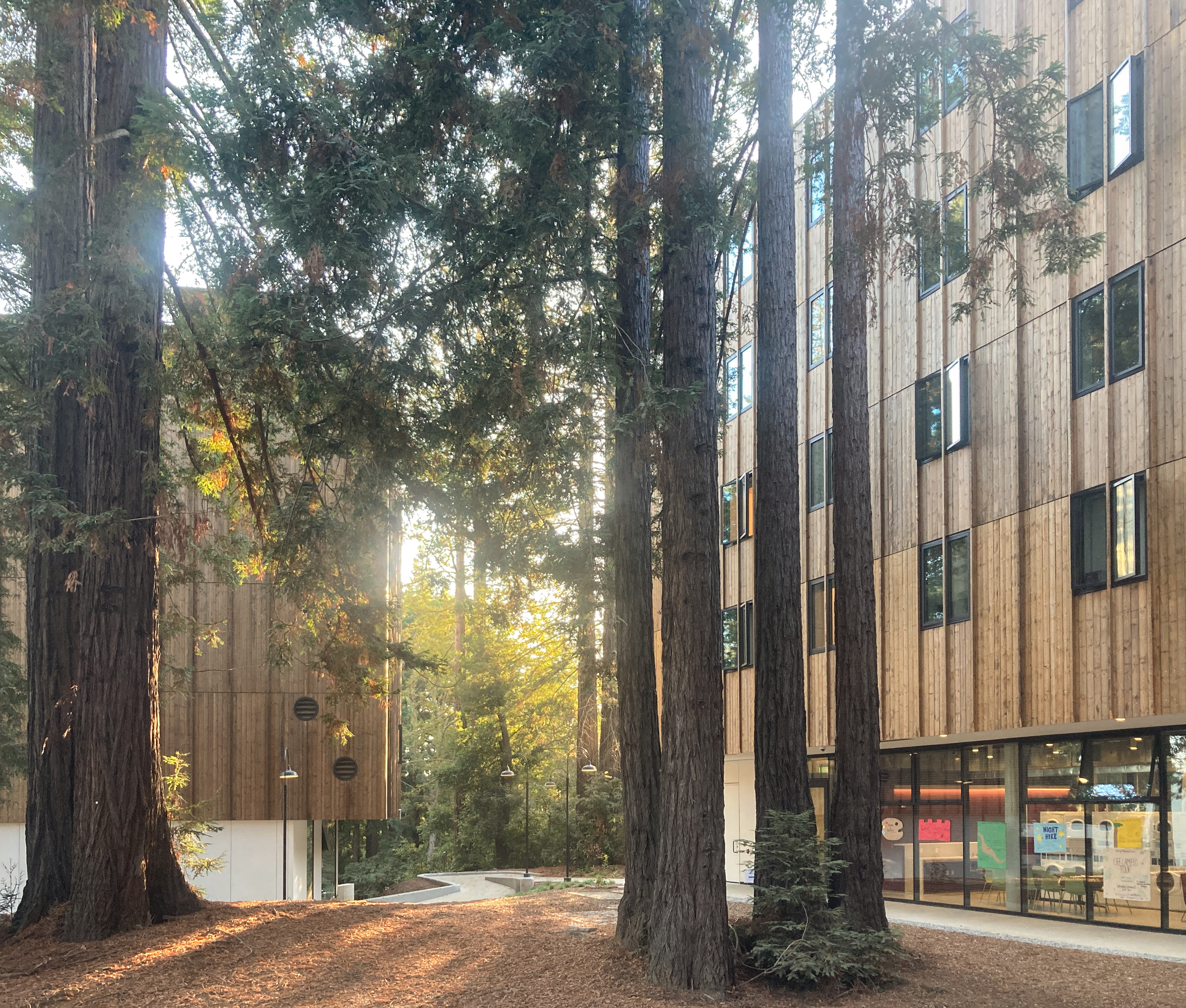
The new residential halls at Kregse College gently bend to avoid disturbing the surrounding redwood trees.

The Kresge Renewal Project is renovating Kresge College to address the University's housing crisis. Buildings R7, the Triplets, and the Recreation Center were demolished to make room for three new dormitory buildings, which opened in 2023. Designed by Studio Gang, the curved, mass-timber buildings were shaped to preserve as many redwoods as possible and open up views of the forest. The geometry and bright colors of the end facades resonate with the campus' original architecture by Charles Moore and William Turnbull of MLTW. Social spaces and student amenities occupy the ground floors while residences are located above. The buildings are among the first cross-laminated buildings in California.

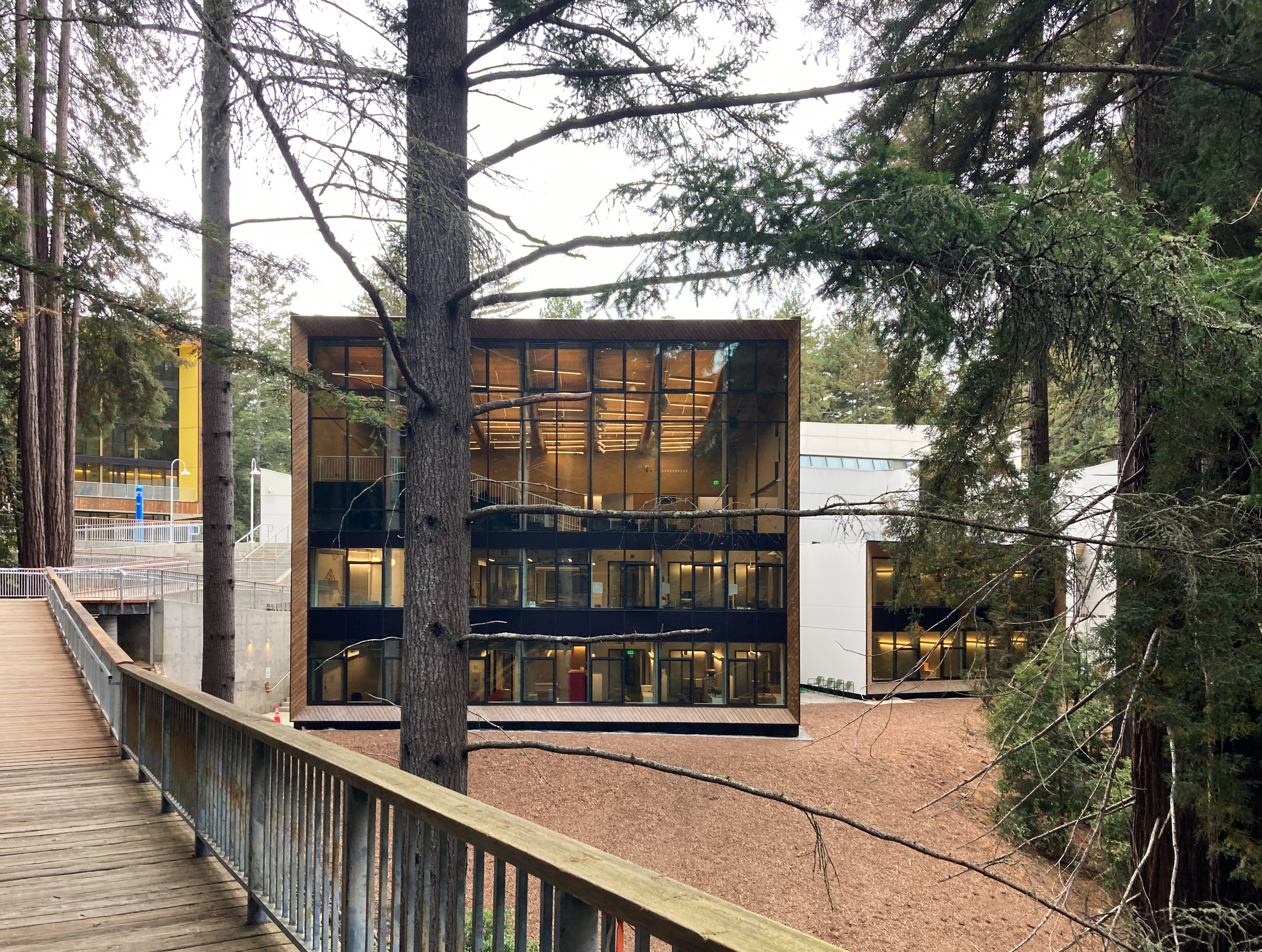
The new pedestrian walkway brings students to the new academic center.

The new Kresge Academic Center, also designed by Studio Gang, opened in 2023 on Upper Street, where the old Town Hall previously stood. It includes two lecture halls, classrooms, academic offices, work and meeting areas, and an outdoor terrace. The design employs a technique used by polypore fungi — stepping down and flaring out as it descends the steep slope. Large windows look out to the forest and ravine and bring natural light into the building, together with clerestory windows along the passageways. Organic, gently curved outer walls are finished with white plaster, tying the materials of the new building with the original architecture.

A new Kresge Town Hall will be built where R11 was located. The Renewal Project will also aid in helping Kresge College becoming ADA compliant, raising the North "Kresge Bridge". Notable features such as the waterfall steps, piazzetta, and Mayor's Stand will remain; the piazzetta has plans to be renovated as well however. Keeping with the tradition of Kresge's design, focus groups and town halls were hosted to gain student input to the renovations.

== The early years ==
According to UC President Clark Kerr, Edgar had been influenced by the work of Carl Rogers and was attempting to translate Rogers' notion of client-centered psychotherapy into a form of student-centered education. Kerr sarcastically explained in his memoirs how this turned out: "A recipe for total anarchy. A recipe for Kresge." The problem with running the college as a participatory democracy was that only the most committed activists could make it work; everyone else was either sidelined or simply fled.

In the early days, Kresge had a threefold focus: humanistic psychology, women's studies and environmental studies. The best history of the early days of the college is a chapter in Gerald Grant and David Reisman's award-winning book on experimental colleges in the United States, The Perpetual Dream: Reform and Experiment in the American College (University of Chicago Press, 1979). Today, the literature, feminist studies and writing departments have moved to the new Humanities building while the Writing Program and the Science Communication Program remain in Kresge.

Each UCSC college has one "core" course mandatory for all first-year affiliates. Kresge's current core course is Academic Literacy and Ethos, focused on intellectual development within the academic context. Previous core courses include Power and Representation, which examined the ways in which an individual relates to communities by focusing on representations of gender, ethnicity, class, sexual orientation and race.

Kresge's idiosyncratic architecture, designed by architects William Turnbull and Charles Moore, is based on a fantasy Italian village which winds up the hillside. Instead of dormitories, Kresge housing consisted of apartments, suites (which allowed students to have small single rooms), and octets. The octets were large housing spaces intended for eight students, which the architects deliberately left unfinished. When the college opened, each group of eight students was given $2,000 to design and build the inner walls and floors. The earlier octets had significant open and communal spaces, but the ones designed later had more walls and individual rooms. The openness created such an interpersonal intensity that by the end of the first year, thirty one of the thirty two original students had left the octets for other housing. Also, in the first quarter, they went from octets housing eight students, to sextets housing six students. Today most of the apartments, suites, and sextets serve the same purpose as dorm rooms, although they contain private kitchens, bathrooms, and living rooms. The college is acclaimed in architectural circles. For example, it is included in G. E. Kidder Smith's 1996 book Sourcebook of American Architecture: 500 Notable Buildings from the 10th Century to the Present (Princeton University Press).

At the north end of the college was the Kresge Town Hall, which has seen many groundbreaking performances, including the third Talking Heads concert on the west coast, given Dec 4, 1977. 1977 was also the year that the legendary conference, "LSD: A Generation Later" was held at Kresge College. The conference was attended by both counterculture figures such as Timothy Leary PhD, Allen Ginsberg, Ram Dass, Stephen Gaskin, and Ralph Metzner PhD, as well as early psychedelic researchers including Oscar Janiger, MD, William McGlothlin, PhD, Stanley Krippner, PhD, Claudio Naranjo, MD and Willis Harman PhD.

During the day, Town Hall served as a classroom. In the evenings and weekends, it was still used for events such as concerts and films. Annual events include the Fall Film Festival and Halloween showings of The Rocky Horror Picture Show with a live cast.

In 1979, Chancellor Robert L. Sinsheimer implemented major reforms at the Santa Cruz campus which finally ended the most unusual aspects of the Kresge experiment.

Kresge was originally endowed by the Kresge family trust, whose fortune was derived from K-Mart; one of the early (and very ironic) nicknames of Kresge was 'K-Mart' college; considering its traditionally counter-cultural orientation, it was about as far from the middle American K-Mart image as could be imagined. The architects originally wanted to put a neon sign from an S. S. Kresge department store at the entrance to the college, but this idea met too much resistance.

== Student life ==
Kresge College is currently home to several co-ops (Natural Foods Co-op, Photo Co-op, Garden Co-op) as well as the social justice organization, Common Grounds. Residential housing themes include the Writer's House, the Eco-Village, Trans Inclusive Housing, Substance Free, Sober and Clean Recovery Housing, Single Gender, and Mixed Gender.

Services for Transfer and Re-entry Students (STARS), the Veterans Resource Center (VETS), and the Student Lounge which has a public kitchen and restrooms are all services within Kresge College, located next to the Piazzetta, west of Lower Street.

Kresge Parliament, and the Kresge Multicultural Education Committee (KMEC), and Orientation Leaders are ways that Kresge students can get more involved in student life. Kresge Parliament is the student government representing Kresge College. It is open to all Kresge affiliates, from first years to transfer students, and engages in community service, funding requests, and occasionally hosts events. KMEC sponsors PRIDE, an annual campus wide event starting at the Bookstore and ending in Kresge Lower Street. PRIDE often has resources, food, and performances from various student clubs. Orientation Leaders meet before the school year and welcome in the incoming freshmen. They help with move in, and welcome week where they host various events to create a community in Kresge and help with any move in nerves. An annual welcome week tradition is the Board Walk Frolic where UCSC students collectively go to the Santa Cruz Beach Boardwalk.

Next to the computer lab, there is a Free Book Library where students can leave and take books as needed. This Library was added in 2017 by Kresge Parliament. Parliament also purchased a ping pong table which is located in the laundry room where students are able to play against each other while waiting for their clothes to finish washing.

The Kresge Programs Office hosts events for students yearlong. Every quarter, there is a Late Night Breakfast where the Porter/Kresge Dining Hall is reserved only for Kresge Affiliates. The Programs Office also offers supplies for students to check out including board games, Giant Jenga, and frisbees.

== Interesting points ==
One of the alumni of Kresge, Marti Noxon, went on to produce Buffy the Vampire Slayer, and managed to sneak in-joke references to Kresge as well as Santa Cruz into many of the scripts, most recently in the Angel spin-off where a supporting character (Eve) is described as a graduate of Kresge. Another alumnus, Richard Bandler, developed Neuro-Linguistic programming with one of his Kresge professors, John Grinder. Alumnus Doug Foster went on to become the editor of Mother Jones magazine and an Emmy Award-winning TV producer.

In 1987, a chicken, named Chick Chick, lived in/around the Octagon sextet, and was known to wander around campus looking for things to eat. Later, a loose pet hamster would unknowingly fall down a heating duct in the same sextet and die, producing a lingering foul smell every time the heat was turned on.

Kresge may also be a place where the Jewish Renewal movement was advanced as Reb Zalman-Schacter visited Professor Michael Kahn, one of the founders of humanistic psychology, several times in the early 1970s. Reb Zalman also taught one semester at Kresge.

Adam Carson, drummer for the band AFI, lived in an apartment in Kresge his sophomore year of college which he "spent all my time hanging out with Fritch at Stevenson. Then I dropped out and went on tour..." He recalls it as "the bigger mistake" he made, after living at Rachel Carson College his freshman year.

Kresge symbolically "seceded" in April 1990 from the rest of the main university "in the name of the environment ... [and] in the name of the Earth."

== Dining ==
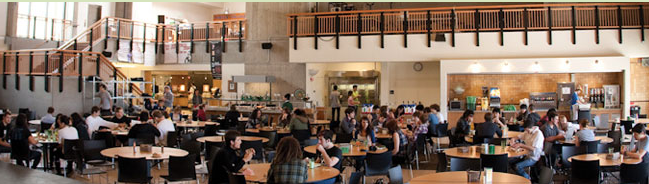
Porter/Kresge Dining Hall

The closest dining hall is the Porter/Kresge dining hall in Porter College, with the Porter Slug Cafe (previously known as the Hungry Slug, and before that a worker's collective called Sluggo's Pizza) adjacent to the dining hall. The servery offers chef-customized traditional style entrees, signature salads, and pizzas. The dining hall is well known for having a variety of vegetarian and vegan options and also has a wonderful outside deck with a view of the adjacent Porter meadow and the Monterey Bay ocean view. Formerly, at the end of Kresge Upper Street was the Owl's Nest, which acted as Kresge's official cafe (the Slug being that of Porter). The cafe was well known for having exotic, delicious fruits and vegetables smoothies. In addition, it served a variety of entree options. Due to the Kresge Renewal Project, Owl's Nest was temporarily taken down until construction was complete, but it reopened in the spring of 2024. It now primarily serves breakfast and Mediterranean bowls.
