= Sally Pierone =

American art director

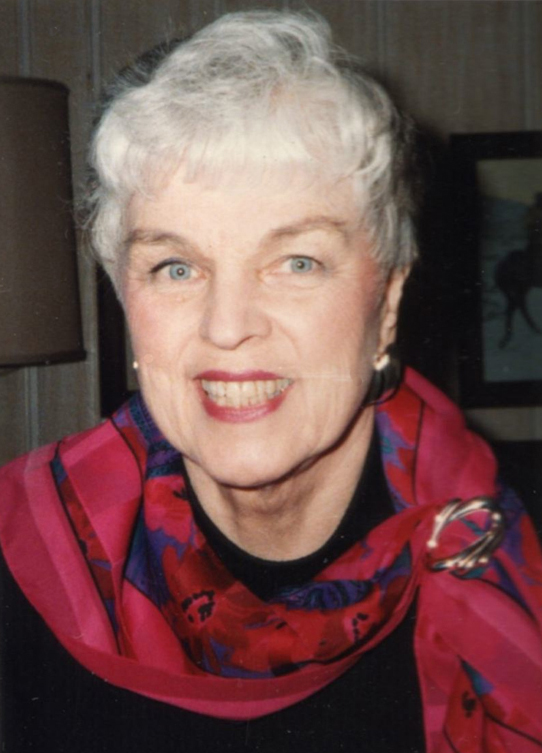
- Born: 10 February 1921; Spokane, Washington, U.S.
- Died: 22 June 2018 (aged 97); Pasadena, California, U.S.
- Occupations: Artist, Family Counselor

Sarah Nettleton "Sally" Pierone (10 February 1921 – 22 June 2018) was an American art director of the Marshall Plan who in 1952 worked at the American Embassy in Paris creating posters, booklets and displays to help rebuild Europe after World War II.

A family counselor as well as an artist, Pierone created the image of "The Raft", enlarging upon Virginia Satir's concepts of family roles by showing how four personality stereotypes counterbalance one another. She is the subject of a biography, Sally — The Older Woman's Illustrated Guide to Self-Improvement, by Judy Laddon.

== Early life ==
Sally Pierone was born Sarah Nettleton Paine on 10 February 1921 in Spokane, Washington. She was the second of two children born to Clara Abercrombie Paine and attorney Alan Paine. Her sister, Harriet, was a year older. Her maternal grandfather, William Ralph Abercrombie, had been the first soldier to arrive in the small settlement of Spokane in 1877.

The newborn Sally was a blue baby who suffered from inattention because her mother was hemorrhaging during childbirth. Clara Paine survived, but for six weeks the baby remained in the hospital. This lack of early maternal bonding, in Pierone's view, caused psychological trauma that she addressed through her art.

Her father was a prominent attorney, eventually a partner in a Spokane law firm that still bears his name, Paine Hamblen. The Paine grandparents owned a family compound in nearby Hayden Lake, Idaho, where Sally and her sister spent their summers. Bing Crosby was a seasonal neighbor and friend.

== Education ==
- 1936-1938 Pierone boarded at a private high school, Seattle's The Bush School.
- 1938-1940 She attended Chouinard Art Institute (now California Institute of the Arts) in Los Angeles, studying with Italian artist Rico Lebrun and becoming close friends with fellow student Tom Keogh, who became a successful artist, costume and set designer, and who married [[Theodora

Keogh|Theodora Roosevelt]], President Theodore Roosevelt's granddaughter.

- 1940-1942 School of Boston Museum of Fine Arts. During the summer of 1941 she worked for Cape Cod folk artist Peter Hunt, who was a national phenomenon, painting bright, primitive pictures on cheap, antiqued furniture. Pierone painted a four-panel screen for opera star Lily Pons.
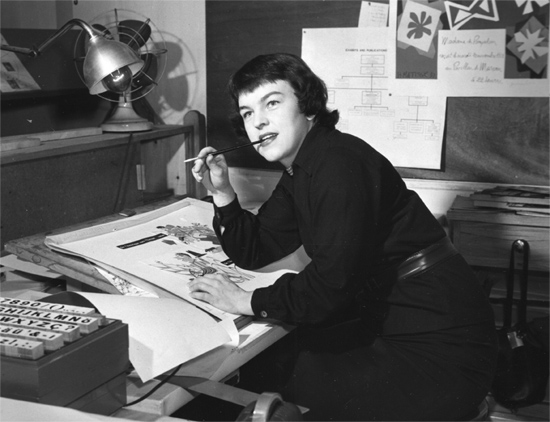

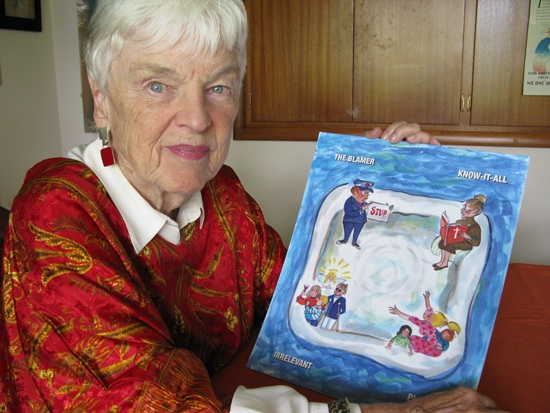

== Work experience ==
1942-1946 Lived in New York City with her Boston friend Mary Helen Brown. Pierone worked as a full-time assistant art director of W. T. Grant, the burgeoning chain of dime stores. She reconnected with her friend Tom Keogh, also living in New York and working as a costume and set designer/illustrator for Barbara Karinska, costume director for the New York City Ballet.

1946 Returned to Spokane, where she took a job as artist in a small ad agency, Pierone and Associates, owned by a young man, Bob Pierone. They dated for four years.

1950-1952 Sally traveled to Europe with her friend Mary Virginia Gordon, sailing tourist class on the Italian ship Saturnia, arriving in Naples. After stays in Rome and Florence, the young women moved to Paris, where Pierone stayed through 1952. It was in Paris that she took the job of art director of the Marshall Plan, working at the American Embassy and creating posters, booklets, and displays for the European Freedom Train. She also drew illustrations for Newsweek, the New York Times and the Paris Review.

== European social scene ==
In Florence Pierone became friends with Arthur Penn, who later became the famous film producer. Their group of stylish ex-pats obtained recordings of Broadway musicals, which they enacted during dinner parties at a Florentine villa.

In Paris she remained close to Tom Keogh, who was drawing illustrations for books and magazines, including the cover of the first Paris edition of Vogue (magazine). She was also close to Tom's wife, novelist Theodora Roosevelt, granddaughter of President Teddy. She knew society arts patron Marie-Laure, Vicomtesse de Noaille, as well as Julian Stein (Gertrude Stein's nephew), French illustrator William Pene duBois, and American humorist Art Buchwald. Pierone illustrated Buchwald's book Paris After Dark.

== Later life ==
She returned to Spokane at the end of 1952 and fell into a depression, beginning what became many years of psychotherapy. Her marriage to Bob Pierone in 1953 did not prove happy, despite the birth of their three sons: Nick, Peri and Dino. Bob Pierone, an Army code-breaker during World War II, became a prominent Spokane clothier. In her search to understand the source of her problems, Sally studied with famed family therapist Virginia Satir and began to gain tools for reshaping her life. Despite her divorce in 1974, she built a fulfilling life as an artist and family counselor. She created the concept of "The Raft," enlarging upon Satir's personality stereotypes of the Blamer, Super-Reasonable, Placater, and Irrelevant. In her 80s Pierone embarked on a new kind of painting, based upon the teachings of Frenchwoman Michele Cassou. Pierone died in June 2018 at the age of 97.
