= Michele Cassou =

American painter, teacher and author

- Born: September 27, 1942 (age 83); U.S.
- Known for: Painter, Teacher, Author
- Website: www.michelecassou.com

Michele Cassou (born 27 September 1942) is an American painter, teacher, writer and author.

== Biography ==
Cassou is an artist who holds dual citizenship in France and the United States. She is known for her use of the "Point Zero Painting" technique. Her early works have been included in the Collection de l'art brut, a collection curated by Jean Dubuffet and permanently displayed in Lausanne.

She began teaching in her early twenties, in Paris, Ottawa, Montreal, then in the United States, including San Francisco. She teaches the Point Zero Method and conducts workshops around the USA and Europe including: the Esalen Institute in Big Sur, California, the New York Open Center, the Mabel Dodge Luhan House in Taos, New Mexico, and various Zen centers.

== Publications ==
- Cassou, Michele; Cubley, Stewart (1995). Life, Paint and Passion: Reclaiming the magic of spontaneous expression. Penguin Putnam Inc. ISBN 0-87477-810-7.
- Cassou, Michele (2001). Point Zero; Creativity without limits. Penguin Putnam Inc. ISBN 1-58542-085-9.
- Cassou, Michele (2004). Kids Play: Igniting Children's Creativity. New York, USA: Penguin Group (USA) Inc. ISBN 1-58542-328-9.
- Cassou, Michele (2009). Questions: To awaken your creative power to the fullest. New York, USA: Point Zero Publishing. ISBN 978-0980225914.
- Cassou, Michele (2011). Teachers That Dare: Using the creative process to teach the creative process. DeHart's Publishing USA. ISBN 978-0-9802259-2-1.
- Cassou, Michele (2016). Answering the Call of Creativity. ISBN 9781514167496.
- Cassou, Michele (2017). A Graphic Approach to Creativity. ISBN 9781977578396.
- Cassou, Michele (2020). Painting Between Worlds: A Life of Creative Passion. ISBN 978-1650986944.

She contributed an essay Inside the heartbeat of creation to the 1999 publication The soul of creativity : insights into the creative process ed. Tona Pierce Myers (Pub. New World Library)

== Videos ==
Cassou released several videos, including:

- Birth of a Process (1999)
- Creativity and Passion (1999)
- Point Zero: Insights and Images (2003)
- The Flowering of Children's Creativity (2006)
- Awakening of the Mystic (2009)
- Body, Sexuality, and Spirit (2010)
