= Virginia Satir =

American psychotherapist (1916–1988)

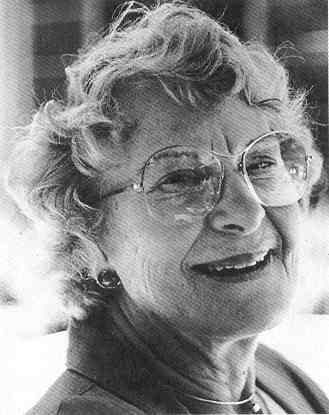
- Born: June 26, 1916; Neillsville, Wisconsin, US
- Died: September 10, 1988 (aged 72); Menlo Park, California, U.S.
- Education: Milwaukee State Teachers College (now University of Wisconsin-Milwaukee), (BA, 1936), University of Chicago (MSSA, 1948)
- Occupations: Social worker, therapist, author
- Known for: Family systems therapy
- Spouse(s): Gordon Rodgers (divorced 1949), Norman Satir (divorced 1957)
- Children: 2

Virginia Satir (June 26, 1916 – September 10, 1988) was an American author, clinical social worker and psychotherapist, recognized for her approach to family therapy. Her pioneering work in the field of family reconstruction therapy honored her with the title "Mother of Family Therapy". Her best known books are Conjoint Family Therapy, 1964, Peoplemaking, 1972, and The New Peoplemaking, 1988.

She is also known for creating the Virginia Satir Change Process Model, a psychological model developed through clinical studies. Change management and organizational "gurus" of the 1990s and 2000s embrace this model to define how change impacts organizations. She died in 1988 in Menlo Park, California, of pancreatic cancer, aged 72.

== Early years ==
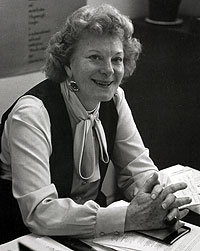
Virginia Satir

Virginia Satir was born on June 26, 1916 in Neillsville, Wisconsin. She was the eldest of five children born to Oscar Alfred Reinnard Pagenkopf and Minnie (Happe) Pagenkopf. When she was five years old, Satir suffered from appendicitis. Her mother, a devout Christian Scientist, refused to take her to a doctor. By the time Satir's father decided to overrule his wife, the young girl's appendix had ruptured. Doctors were able to save her life, but Satir was forced to stay in the hospital for several months.

When Satir was three years old, she taught herself to read and by age nine, she had read all of the books in the library of her small one-room school. From early years, Satir demonstrated an interest in family dynamics. When she was five, she decided that she would grow up to be "a children's detective on parents, inclinations that would later become true through her therapeutic practices." She later explained that "I didn't quite know what I would look for, but I realized a lot went on in families that didn't meet the eye."

In 1929, her mother insisted that the family move from their farm to Milwaukee so that Satir could attend high school. Satir's high school years coincided with the Great Depression, and to help her family she took a part-time job and also attended as many courses as she could so that she could graduate early. In 1932, she received her high school diploma and promptly enrolled in Milwaukee State Teachers College (now University of Wisconsin–Milwaukee.) To pay for her education she worked part-time for the Works Projects Administration and for Gimbels Department Store and further supplemented her income by babysitting. She graduated with a bachelor's degree in education, and worked as a teacher for a few years.

During her time as a schoolteacher, she recognized that involved and supportive parents not only help students in the classroom but could also heal family dynamics. Satir began meeting and cooperating with the parents of her students and saw the family system as a reflection of the world at large, stating "if we can heal the family, we can heal the world."

Beginning in 1937, for three summers she took courses at Northwestern University in Chicago. Her interest in families led her to enroll full-time at the University of Chicago School of Social Services Administration where she obtained a master's degree in social work. She finished her coursework for her master's degree in 1943, and completed her thesis for her degree in 1948.

== Career as a therapist ==
After graduating social work school, Satir began working in private practice. She met with her first family in 1951, and by 1955 was working with Illinois Psychiatric Institute, encouraging other therapists to focus on families instead of individual patients. By the end of the decade she had moved to California, where she cofounded the Mental Research Institute (MRI) in Palo Alto, California. MRI received a grant from NIMH in 1962, allowing them to begin the first formal family therapy training program ever offered; Satir was hired as its training director.

Satir's skills and views about the important role the family has and its connection to an individual's problems and/or healing process led her into becoming a renowned therapist. One of Satir's most novel ideas at the time was that the "presenting issue" or "surface problem" itself was seldom the real problem; rather, how people coped with the issue created the problem. Satir also offered insights into the particular problems that low self-esteem could cause in relationships. In addition to Satir's influence in human sciences, she helped establish organizations with the purpose of educating therapists around the world and granting them with resources to help families and clients.

Long interested in the idea of networking, Satir founded two groups to help individuals find mental health workers or other people who were suffering from similar issues to their own. In 1970, she organized Beautiful People, which later became known as the International Human Learning Resources Network. In 1977 she founded the Avanta Network, which was renamed to the Virginia Satir Global Network in 2010.

Two years later, Satir was appointed to the Steering Committee of the International Family Therapy Association and became a member of the advisory board for the National Council for Self-Esteem.

She has also been recognized with several honorary doctorates, including a 1978 doctorate in Social Sciences from the University of Wisconsin–Madison.

Honors and awards received

- 1976: Awarded Gold Medal of "Outstanding and Consistent Service to Mankind" by the University of Chicago.
- 1978: Awarded honorary doctorate in Social Sciences from the University of Wisconsin–Madison.
- 1982: Selected by the West German Government as one of the twelve most influential leaders in the world today.
- 1985: Time magazine quotes a colleague, "She can fill any auditorium in the country", after her stellar contribution to the Evolution of Psychotherapy Conference in Phoenix, Arizona.
- 1985: Selected by the prestigious National Academy of Practice as one of two members to advise on health concerns to the Congress of the United States.
- 1986: Selected as member of the International Council of Elders, a society developed by the recipients of the Nobel Peace Prize.
- 1987: Named Honorary Member of the Czechoslovak Medical Society.
- She was honored in the California Social Work Hall of Distinction.
- In two national surveys of psychiatrists, psychologists, social workers, and marriage and family therapists, she was voted the most influential therapist.

== Work and influence ==
Satir's entire work was done under the umbrella of "Becoming More Fully Human". From the possibility of a nurturing primary triad of father, mother, and child she conceived a process of Human Validation. She viewed the reconciliation of families as a way to reconcile the world. As she said: "The family is a microcosm. By knowing how to heal the family, I know how to heal the world." (Align, 1988, p. 20) With this overview she established professional training groups in the Satir Model in the Middle East, the East Aisa, Western and Eastern Europe, Central and Latin America, and Russia. The Institute for International Connections, Avanta Network, and the International Human Learning Resources Network are concrete examples of teaching people how to connect with one another and then extend the connections. Her world impact could be summed up in her universal mantra: peace within, peace between, peace among.

In the mid-1970s, her work was extensively studied by the co-founders of neuro-linguistic programming (NLP), Richard Bandler and John Grinder, who used it as one of the three fundamental models of NLP. Bandler and Grinder also collaborated with Satir to author Changing With Families for Science and Behavior Books, which bore the subtitle 'A Book About Further Education for Being Human'. The Virginia Satir Global Network, originally named AVANTA by Satir, is an international organization that carries on her work and promotes her approach to family therapy.

In 1984, Satir encouraged marriage and family therapists to shift their focus to relationship education:

We're at a crossroads, an important crossroads of how we view people. That's why it's possible now for all the different kind of therapies to go into education, education for being more fully human, using what we know as a pathology is only something that tells us that something is wrong and then allows us to move towards how we can use this to develop round people. I'm fortunate in being one of the people who pushed my way through to know that people are really round. That's what it means to me to look at people as people who have potential that can be realized, as people who can have dreams and have their dreams work out. What people bring to me in the guise of problems are their ways of living that keep them hampered and pathologically oriented. What we're doing now is seeing how education allows us to move toward more joy, more reality, more connectedness, more accomplishment and more opportunities for people to grow.

Steve Andreas, one of Bandler and Grinder's students, wrote Virginia Satir: The Patterns of Her Magic (1991) in which he summarized the major patterns of Satir's work, and then showed how Satir applied them in a richly annotated verbatim transcript of a videotaped session titled "Forgiving Parents". In this session, Satir works with a woman who hated her mother, and had difficulty connecting with others as a result. Using a variety of role-plays, including a "family reconstruction", this woman came to see her mother as her "best friend", as detailed in a 3½ year follow-up interview.

== Process of Change Model ==
Another of Satir's work that would have lasting impacts on many fields, including organizational management, is the Process of Change model. This model illustrates how individuals go through change and how they can cope with such change to improve their relationship with each other. The Process of Change Model is divided into four stages: late status quo, chaos, practice and integration, and new status quo.

In the first stage of change, the late status quo, Satir argued the individual is in a predictable environment. Status quo involves a set routine, fixed ideas about the world, and an established behavior. This stage is all about predictability and familiarity.

The second stage of change is chaos. Chaos, as described by Satir, occurs when something in the environment or in the individual changes. This change brings a sense of unfamiliarity and the previously stable routine can no longer be held. In the stage of chaos, here are many strong feelings like sadness, fear, confusion, stress, among others. Satir argues that in the change stage of chaos, therapists must help families and individuals navigate these emotions.

The third stage of change is practice and integration. In this stage new ideas are being implemented and individuals are figuring out what works best. Like any other skill, it requires patience and practice.

The final stage of change is the new status quo. In this stage, the new ideas, behaviors, and changes are not so new anymore. Individuals tend to acclimate to the change, figure out what works, and become better at their new skill.

Satir points out that this change process is not linear. On some occasions, individuals might have found a temporary coping skill or solution, but if it does not bring the desired results, they might regress to the stage of chaos. For this reason, it is important that therapists are aware of this process to help guide their clients.

== Career as author ==
Satir published her first book, Conjoint Family Therapy, in 1964, developed from the training manual she wrote for students at MRI. Her reputation grew with each subsequent book, and she travelled the world to speak on her methods. She also became a Diplomate of the Academy of Certified Social Workers and received the American Association for Marriage and Family Therapy's Distinguished Service Award.

Satir often integrated meditations and poetic writing into both her public workshops and writings. One of her most well-known works, "I Am Me," was written by Satir in response to a question posed by an angry teenage girl.

=== I Am Me ===
My declaration of self-esteem

I am me
In all the world, there is no one else exactly like me
Everything that comes out of me is authentically mine
because I alone chose it – I own everything about me
My body, my feelings, my mouth, my voice, all my actions,
whether they be to others or to myself – I own my fantasies,
my dreams, my hopes, my fears – I own all my triumphs and
successes, all my failures and mistakes Because I own all of
me, I can become intimately acquainted with me – by so doing
I can love me and be friendly with me in all my parts – I know
there are aspects about myself that puzzle me, and other
aspects that I do not know – but as long as I am
friendly and loving to myself, I can courageously
and hopefully look for solutions to the puzzles
and for ways to find out more about me – However I
look and sound, whatever I say and do, and whatever
I think and feel at a given moment in time is authentically
me – If later some parts of how I looked, sounded, thought
and felt turned out to be unfitting, I can discard that which is
unfitting, keep the rest, and invent something new for that
which I discarded – I can see, hear, feel, think, say, and do
I have the tools to survive, to be close to others, to be
productive, and to make sense and order out of the world of
people and things outside of me – I own me, and
therefore I can engineer me – I am me and

I AM OKAY

== Bibliography ==
- Satir, Virginia S. (1972). Peoplemaking. Robert S. Spitzer. ISBN 0-8314-0031-5.
- Satir V (1976). Making contact. Millbrae, Calif: Celestial Arts. ISBN 0-89087-119-1.
- Satir V; Bandler R; Grinder J (1976). Changing with families. Palo Alto, CA: Science and Behavior Books. ISBN 0-8314-0051-X.
- Satir V (1978). Your many faces. Berkeley, Calif: Celestial Arts. ISBN 0-89087-120-5.
- Satir V; Stachowiak J; Taschman HA (1994). Helping Families to Change. Northvale, N.J: Jason Aronson. ISBN 1-56821-227-5.
- Satir V (1983). Conjoint family therapy. Palo Alto, CA: Science and Behavior Books. ISBN 0-8314-0063-3.
- Satir V, Baldwin M (1983). Satir step by step: a guide to creating change in families. Palo Alto, CA: Science and Behavior Books. ISBN 0-8314-0068-4.
- Satir V (1988). The new peoplemaking. Palo Alto, CA: Science and Behavior Books. ISBN 0-8314-0070-6.
- Satir V; Gomori M; Banmen J; Gerber JS (1991). The Satir model: family therapy and beyond. Palo Alto, CA: Science and Behavior Books. ISBN 0-8314-0078-1.
- Satir V (1990) [1972]. Peoplemaking. Souvenir Press Ltd. ISBN 0-285-64872-1.
- Englander-Golden; P; Satir, V. Say It Straight: From Compulsions to Choices, Science and Behavior Books, Palo Alto, CA 1991. ISBN 9780831400743
- Satir V (2001). Self Esteem. Berkeley, Calif: Celestial Arts. ISBN 1-58761-094-9.

== See also ==
- Family systems therapy
- Humanistic psychology
- Systems psychology
- Carl Whitaker
- Sally Pierone
