= John Grinder =

American linguist (born 1940)

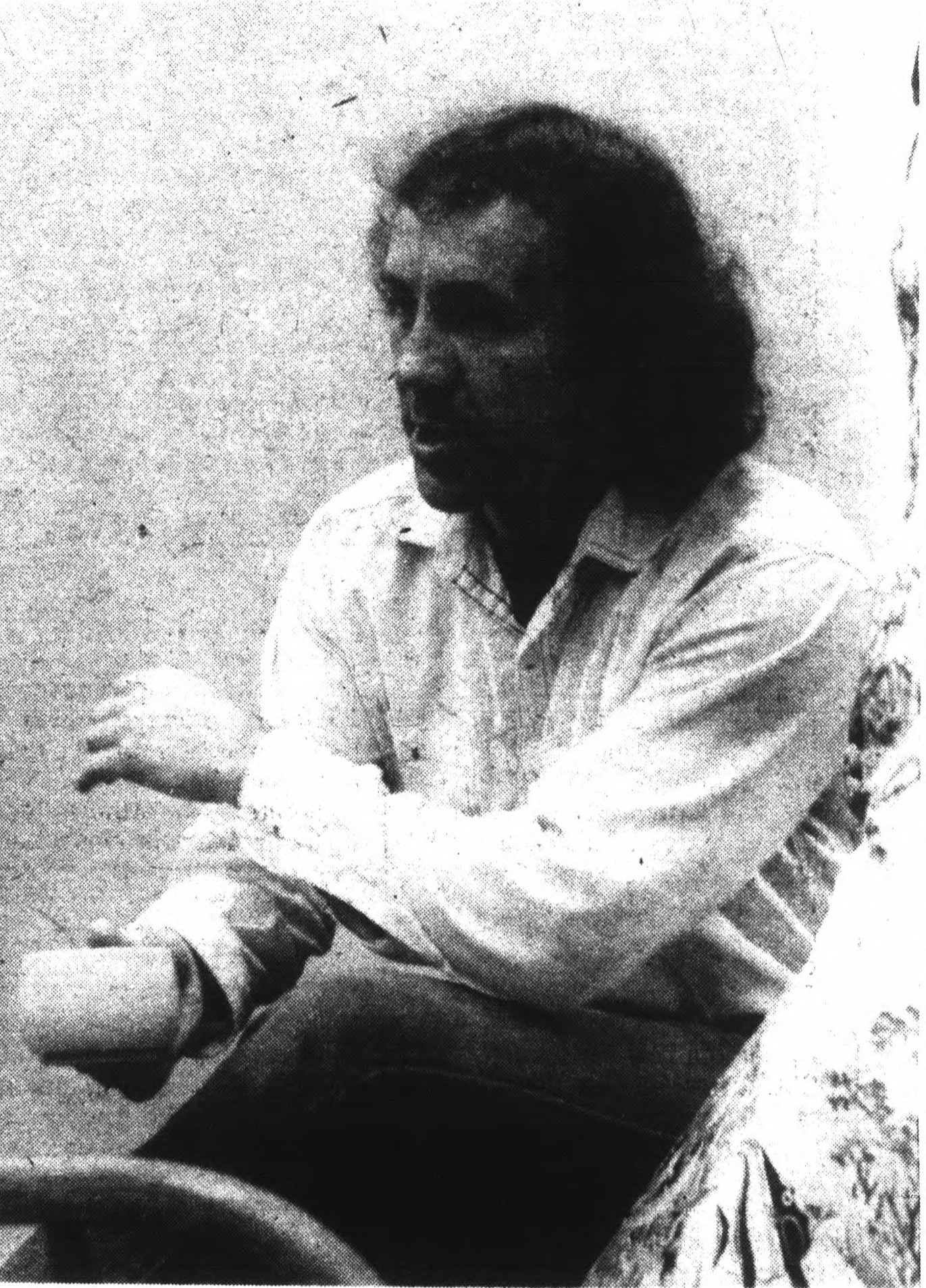
- Grinder in 1976
- Born: January 10, 1940 (age 86); United States
- Spouse: Carmen Bostic St Clair

Philosophical work
- School: Neuro-linguistic programming
- Main interests: Transformational grammar, NLP modeling, Cybernetic epistemology
- Notable ideas: Neuro-linguistic programming, New Code of NLP
- Website: johngrinder.com

John Thomas Grinder Jr. (/ˈɡrɪndər/ GRIN-dər; born January 10, 1940) is an American linguist, writer, management consultant, trainer and speaker. Grinder is credited with co-creating the pseudoscience known as neuro-linguistic programming (NLP) with Richard Bandler. He is co-director of Quantum Leap Inc., a management consulting firm founded by his partner Carmen Bostic St. Clair in 1987 (Grinder joined in 1989). Grinder and Bostic St. Clair also run workshops and seminars on NLP internationally.

== Life and career ==
Grinder graduated from the University of San Francisco with a B.A. degree in psychology in the early 1960s. Grinder then entered the United States Army and served as a captain in the US Special Forces in Europe during the Cold War; following this he went on to work for a US intelligence agency. In the late 1960s, he returned to college to study linguistics and received his Ph.D. degree from the University of California, San Diego in 1971. His dissertation, titled On Deletion Phenomena in English, was published by Mouton in 1976.

In the early 1970s, Grinder worked in George A. Miller's laboratory at Rockefeller University. After receiving his doctorate, Grinder took a full-time position as an assistant professor in the linguistics faculty at the University of California, Santa Cruz (UCSC). He engaged in undergraduate teaching, graduate teaching, and research. His research focused on Noam Chomsky's theories of transformational grammar specializing in syntax and deletion phenomena. He published several research papers with Paul Postal on the syntactical structures relating to "missing antecedents" or missing parasitic gaps for the pronoun. They argued that the syntactic structure of a deleted verb phrase (VP) is complete. Edward Klima, doctoral adviser to both Postal and Grinder at UCSC, became involved in the early development of generative semantics.

Grinder co-authored, with Suzette Elgin, a linguistics text book titled A Guide to Transformational Grammar: History, Theory, Practice. In 2005, Grinder published Steps to an Ecology of Emergence with Tom Malloy and Carmen Bostic St Clair in the journal Cybernetics and Human Knowing.

== Development of neuro-linguistic programming ==
In 1972 (during Grinder's stint at University of California, Santa Cruz) Richard Bandler, an undergraduate student of psychology, approached him for assistance in specific aspects of modeling Gestalt therapy. Bandler, along with good friend Frank Pucelik, had spent much time recording and editing recordings of Fritz Perls (founder of Gestalt therapy) and had learned Gestalt therapy implicitly during intense group sessions. After some time, Grinder was invited to participate in group discussions. Although at first Grinder sat quietly, he eventually approached Bandler and Pucelik with some observations and questions. Grinder left a lasting impression on Pucelik and was later dubbed 'the real genius'. Bandler and Pucelik invited Grinder to team up, eventually creating a close group. Although Bandler, Grinder and Pucelik were the main driving force, there were several other students at the university who contributed ‘a hell of a lot’ according to Pucelik. In the end, hours of unpaid research significantly aided the formation of Meta - modern day NLP.

From there Grinder and Bandler modelled the various cognitive behavioral patterns of therapists such as Perls, a leading figure in family therapy Virginia Satir and later the leading figure in hypnosis in psychiatry Milton Erickson. As a result, The Structure of Magic Volumes I & II (1975, 1976), Patterns of the Hypnotic Techniques of Milton H. Erickson, Volumes I & II (1975, 1977) and Changing With Families (1976) were published. This work formed the basis of the methodology that became the foundation of neuro-linguistic programming.

The trio began hosting seminars and practice groups. These served as a place to practice and test their newly discovered patterns while allowing them to transfer the skills to the participants. Several books were published based on transcripts of their seminars, including Frogs into Princes (1979). During this period, a creative group of students and psychotherapists were asked to join including Robert Dilts, Leslie Cameron-Bandler, Judith DeLozier, Stephen Gilligan and David Gordon (All of whom are considered the second generation of co-developers; recruited by Bandler, Grinder and Pucelik after the original team graduated from university).

In the 1977, Bandler requested that Pucelik be removed from the group for personal reasons - which was agreed to by immediate mutual consent. It wasn't long after that that Bandler, Grinder and their group of associates split acrimoniously, and stopped working together. Following this, some members of their group went out on their own and took NLP in their own directions. Some of Bandler and Grinder's books went out of print for a while due to legal problems between the co-authors. Structure I & II, and Patterns I & II – considered the foundation of the field – were later republished. Bandler attempted to claim legal ownership of the term neuro-linguistic programming; however, it was eventually deemed to be a generic term, and could therefore not be trademarked. Grinder and Bandler settled their claims around 2001, clearing a platform for the future development of NLP as a legitimate field of endeavor.

=== New code of neuro-linguistic programming ===
Between 1982 and 1987, strongly influenced by anthropologist and systems theorist Gregory Bateson, who had a strong focus on ecology as a psychological construct, Grinder and Judith DeLozier collaborated to develop the "New Code of NLP". (Grinder and Bateson had met during their affiliation with Kresge College at the University of California, Santa Cruz during the 1970s.) Grinder and Delozier presented an aesthetic framework for the "classic code" of NLP that explicates the involvement of ecology and the unconscious mind in change-work. "Ecology" in NLP involves respecting the integrity of a system as a whole when assessing a change to that system; the "system" in this case comprises a person's model of the world and the consequences of that model in the person's environment. Practically speaking, this consideration entails asking questions like "What are the intended effects of this change? What other effects might this change have, and are those effects desirable? Is this change still a good idea?"

The seminars were transcribed and published in 1987 as Turtles All the Way Down; Prerequisites to Personal Genius.

John Grinder and Carmen Bostic St Clair have further developed The New Code of NLP. (Bostic St Clair founded Quantum Leap Inc., a cultural-change consultancy firm.) As of 2014 Grinder and Bostic St Clair continue to present public seminars on NLP internationally. In 2001, Grinder (with Bostic St Clair) published Whispering in the Wind with a "set of recommendations as to how specifically NLP can improve its practice and take its rightful place as a scientifically based endeavor with its precise focus on modeling of the extremes of human behavior: excellence and the high performers who actually do it". Grinder has since begun to strongly encourage the field to make a recommitment to what he considers the core activity of NLP: modeling.

== Publications ==
=== Linguistics ===
- John Grinder (1969). "Conjunct splitting in Samoan". Linguistic Notes from la Jolla (La Jolla, CA). 2. University of California, San Diego, Dept. of Linguistics: 46–79. OCLC 16334022.
- Grinder, J. (1970). "Super Equi-NP Deletion". In M. Campbell (ed.). Papers from the Sixth Regional Meeting of the Chicago Linguistic Society. Sixth Regional Meeting of the Chicago Linguistic Society. Chicago, Illinois: University of Chicago. pp. 297–317.
- Grinder, John T. (1971). On Deletion Phenomena in English (Ph.D. linguistics thesis). San Diego, California: University of California. p. 190. OCLC 17641707.
- John Grinder; Paul Postal (Winter 1971). "A Global Constraint on Deletion". Linguistic Inquiry. 2 (1). MIT Press: 110–112. JSTOR 4177614.
- John Grinder (Autumn 1971). "Double Indices". Linguistic Inquiry. 2 (4). MIT Press: 572. JSTOR 4177667.
- John Grinder (Spring 1971). "Chains of Co-reference". Linguistic Inquiry. 2 (2). MIT Press: 183–202. JSTOR 4177624.
- John Grinder; Paul Postal (Summer 1971). "Missing Antecedents". Linguistic Inquiry. 2 (3). MIT Press: 269–312. JSTOR 4177639.
- John Grinder (1971). "A Reply to Super Equi-NP Deletion as Dative Deletion". In Douglas, A. (ed.). Papers from the Seventh Regional meeting, Chicago Linguistic Society. Chicago, Illinois. pp. 101–111.
- John Grinder (1972). "On the Cycle in Syntax". In John P. Kimball (ed.). Syntax and Semantics I. New York, Academic Press. pp. 81–112.
- John Grinder & Suzette Elgin (1975). "Bully for Us". Syntax and Semantics. 4. Los Angeles, CA: Academic Press: 239–47.
- John Grinder; Suzette Elgin (1973). A Guide to Transformational Grammar: History, Theory, Practice. Austin, TX: Holt, Rinehart and Winston. ISBN 0-03-080126-5.
- John Grinder (1976). On deletion phenomena in English. Janua linguarum. Series minor. The Hauge: Mouton. ISBN 90-279-3005-8. OCLC 2807166.

=== Neuro-linguistic programming ===
- Bandler, Richard; John Grinder (1975a). The Structure of Magic I: A Book About Language and Therapy. Palo Alto, CA: Science and Behavior Books. ISBN 0-8314-0044-7.
- Bandler, Richard; John Grinder (1975b). The Structure of Magic II: A Book About Communication and Change. Palo Alto, CA: Science and Behavior Books. ISBN 0-8314-0049-8.
- Satir, Virginia; Grinder, John. & Bandler, Richard (1976). Changing with Families: a book about further education for being human. Palo Alto, CA: Science and Behavior Books. ISBN 0-8314-0051-X.
- Grinder, John; Richard Bandler (1976). Patterns of the Hypnotic Techniques of Milton H. Erickson, M.D. Volume I. Cupertino, CA: Meta Publications. ISBN 1-55552-052-9.
- Grinder, John; Richard Bandler & Judith Delozier (1977). Patterns of the Hypnotic Techniques of Milton H. Erickson, M.D. Volume II. Cupertino, CA: Meta Publications. ISBN 1-55552-053-7.
- John Grinder; Richard Bandler (1979). Frogs into Princes: Neuro Linguistic Programming. Moab, UT: Real People Press. pp. 194pp. ISBN 0-911226-19-2.
- Dilts, Robert; John Grinder; Richard Bandler; Leslie Cameron-Bandler & Judith Delozier (1980). Neuro-Linguistic Programming: Volume I: The Study of the Structure of Subjective Experience. Scotts Valley, CA: Meta Publications. ISBN 0-916990-07-9.
- Grinder, John; Richard Bandler (1981). Connirae Andreas (ed.). Trance-Formations: Neuro-Linguistic Programming and the Structure of Hypnosis. Moab, UT: Real People Press. ISBN 0-911226-23-0.
- Grinder, John; Richard Bandler (1983). Reframing: Neuro-linguistic programming and the transformation of meaning. Moab, UT: Real People Press. ISBN 0-911226-25-7.
- Grinder, John & Frank Pucelik, eds. (2013). Origins of Neuro Linguistic Programming. Crown House. p. 288. ISBN 978-1845908584.

=== New code of neuro-linguistic programming ===
- Grinder, John; Judith DeLozier (1987). Turtles All the Way Down: Prerequisites to Personal Genius. Scotts Valley, CA: Grinder & Associates. ISBN 1-55552-022-7.
- Grinder, John; Michael McMaster (1993). Precision: A New Approach to Communication: How to Get the Information You Need to Get Results. Scotts Valley, CA: Grinder & Associates. ISBN 1-55552-049-9.
- Charlotte Bretto Milliner; John Grinder & Sylvia Topel, eds. (1994). Leaves before the wind: leading edge applications of NLP. Scotts Valley, CA: Grinder & Associates. ISBN 1-55552-051-0.
- Carmen Bostic St Clair; John Grinder (2001). Whispering in the Wind. Scotts Valley, CA: J & C Enterprises. ISBN 0-9717223-0-7.
- Tom Malloy; Carmen Bostic St Clair; John Grinder (2005). "Steps to an ecology of emergence" (PDF). Cybernetics and Human Knowing. 11 (3): 102–119. Archived from the original (PDF) on 2006-09-21.
