= Neuro-linguistic programming =

Pseudoscientific approach to psychotherapy

Neuro-linguistic programming (NLP) is a pseudoscientific approach to communication, personal development, and psychotherapy that first appeared in Richard Bandler and John Grinder's book The Structure of Magic I (1975). NLP asserts a connection between neurological processes, language, and acquired behavioral patterns, and that these can be changed to achieve specific goals in life. According to Bandler and Grinder, NLP can treat problems such as phobias, depression, tic disorders, psychosomatic illnesses, near-sightedness, (Note: Note that, in a seminar, Bandler & Grinder 1982, p. 166, said that a single session of NLP combined with hypnosis could eliminate certain eyesight problems such as myopia and cure the common cold (op.cit., pp. 169, 174).) allergy, the common cold, and learning disorders, often in a single session. They also say that NLP can model the skills of exceptional people, allowing anyone to acquire them. (Note: Bandler 1993, p. vii: "In single sessions, they can accelerate learning, neutralize phobias, enhance creativity, improve relationships, eliminate allergies, and lead firewalks without roasting toes. NLP achieves the goal of its inception. We have ways to do what only a genius could have done a decade ago.")

NLP has been adopted by some hypnotherapists as well as by companies that run seminars marketed as leadership training to businesses and government agencies.

No scientific evidence supports the claims made by NLP advocates, and it has been called a pseudoscience. Scientific reviews have shown that NLP is based on outdated metaphors of the brain's inner workings that are inconsistent with current neurological theory, and that NLP contains numerous factual errors. Reviews also found that research that favored NLP contained significant methodological flaws, and that three times as many studies of a much higher quality failed to reproduce the claims made by Bandler, Grinder, and other NLP practitioners.

== Early development ==
According to Bandler and Grinder, NLP consists of a methodology termed modeling, plus a set of techniques that they derived from its initial applications. They derived many of the fundamental techniques from the work of Virginia Satir, Milton Erickson and Fritz Perls. Bandler and Grinder also drew upon the theories of Gregory Bateson, and Noam Chomsky (particularly transformational grammar).

Bandler and Grinder say that their methodology can codify the structure inherent to the therapeutic "magic" as performed in therapy by Perls, Satir and Erickson, and indeed inherent to any complex human activity. From that codification, they say, the structure and its activity can be learned by others. Their 1975 book, The Structure of Magic I: A Book about Language and Therapy, is intended to be a codification of the therapeutic techniques of Perls and Satir.

Bandler and Grinder say that they used their own process of modeling to model Virginia Satir so they could produce what they termed the Meta-Model, a model for gathering information and challenging a client's language and underlying thinking. They say that by challenging linguistic distortions, specifying generalizations, and recovering deleted information in the client's statements, the transformational grammar concept of surface structure yields a more complete representation of the underlying deep structure and therefore has therapeutic benefit. Also derived from Satir were anchoring, future pacing and representational systems.

In contrast, the Milton-Model—a model of the purportedly hypnotic language of Milton Erickson—was described by Bandler and Grinder as "artfully vague" and metaphoric. The Milton-Model is used in combination with the Meta-Model as a softener, to induce "trance" and to deliver indirect therapeutic suggestion.

Psychologist Jean Mercer writes that Chomsky's theories "appear to be irrelevant" to NLP. Linguist Karen Stollznow describes Bandler's and Grinder's reference to such experts as namedropping. Other than Satir, the people they cite as influences did not collaborate with Bandler or Grinder. Chomsky himself has no association with NLP, with his work being theoretical in nature and having no therapeutic element. Stollznow writes, "[o]ther than borrowing terminology, NLP does not bear authentic resemblance to any of Chomsky's theories or philosophies—linguistic, cognitive or political."

According to André Muller Weitzenhoffer, a researcher in the field of hypnosis, "the major weakness of Bandler and Grinder's linguistic analysis is that so much of it is built upon untested hypotheses and is supported by totally inadequate data." Weitzenhoffer adds that Bandler and Grinder misuse formal logic and mathematics, redefine or misunderstand terms from the linguistics lexicon (e.g., nominalization), (Note: Weitzenhoffer 1989, pp. 304–305: "I have chosen nominalization to explain what some of the problems are in Bandler and Grinder's linguistic approach to Ericksonian hypnotism. Almost any other linguistic concept used by these authors could have served equally well for the purpose of showing some of the inherent weaknesses in their treatment.") create a scientific façade by needlessly complicating Ericksonian concepts with unfounded claims, (Note: Weitzenhoffer 1989, p. 307: "As I have mentioned in the last chapter, any references made to left and right brain functions in relation to hypnotic phenomena must be considered as poorly founded. They do not add to our understanding of nor our ability to utilize hypnotic phenomena in the style of Erickson. Indeed, references such as Bandler and Grinder make to these functions give their subject matter a false appearance of having a more scientific status than it has.") make factual errors, (Note: Weitzenhoffer 1989, p. 306: "This work [Trance-formation], incidentally, contains some glaring misstatements of facts. For example, Freud and Mesmer were depicted as contemporaries!") and disregard or confuse concepts central to the Ericksonian approach. (Note: Weitzenhoffer 1989, p. 306: One of the most striking features of the Bandler/Grinder interpretation is that it somehow ignores the issue of the existence and function of suggestion, which even in Erickson's own writings and those done with Rossi, is a central idea.")

More recently, Bandler has stated, "NLP is based on finding out what works and formalizing it. In order to formalize patterns I utilized everything from linguistics to holography ... The models that constitute NLP are all formal models based on mathematical, logical principles such as predicate calculus and the mathematical equations underlying holography." There is no mention of the mathematics of holography nor of holography in general in Spitzer's, or Grinder's account of the development of NLP.

On the matter of the development of NLP, Grinder recollects:

My memories about what we thought at the time of discovery (with respect to the classic code we developed—that is, the years 1973 through 1978) are that we were quite explicit that we were out to overthrow a paradigm and that, for example, I, for one, found it very useful to plan this campaign using in part as a guide the excellent work of Thomas Kuhn (The Structure of Scientific Revolutions) in which he detailed some of the conditions which historically have obtained in the midst of paradigm shifts. For example, I believe it was very useful that neither one of us were qualified in the field we first went after—psychology and in particular, its therapeutic application; this being one of the conditions which Kuhn identified in his historical study of paradigm shifts.

The philosopher Robert Todd Carroll responded that Grinder has not understood Kuhn's text on the history and philosophy of science, The Structure of Scientific Revolutions. Carroll replies: (a) individual scientists never have nor are they ever able to create paradigm shifts volitionally and Kuhn does not suggest otherwise; (b) Kuhn's text does not contain the idea that being unqualified in a field of science is a prerequisite to producing a result that necessitates a paradigm shift in that field and (c) The Structure of Scientific Revolutions is foremost a work of history and not an instructive text on creating paradigm shifts and such a text is not possible—extraordinary discovery is not a formulaic procedure. Carroll explains that a paradigm shift is not a planned activity, rather it is an outcome of scientific effort within the dominant paradigm that produces data that cannot be adequately accounted for within the current paradigm—hence a paradigm shift, i.e. the adoption of a new paradigm. In developing NLP, Bandler and Grinder were not responding to a paradigmatic crisis in psychology nor did they produce any data that caused a paradigmatic crisis in psychology. There is no sense in which Bandler and Grinder caused or participated in a paradigm shift. "What did Grinder and Bandler do that makes it impossible to continue doing psychology ... without accepting their ideas? Nothing," argues Carroll.

=== Commercialization and evaluation ===
By the late 1970s, the human potential movement had developed into an industry and provided a market for some NLP ideas. At the center of this growth was the Esalen Institute at Big Sur, California. Perls had led numerous Gestalt therapy seminars at Esalen. Satir was an early leader and Bateson was a guest teacher. Bandler and Grinder have said that in addition to being a therapeutic method, NLP was also a study of communication and began marketing it as a business tool, writing that, "if any human being can do anything, so can you." After 150 students paid $1,000 each for a ten-day workshop in Santa Cruz, California, Bandler and Grinder gave up academic writing and started producing popular books from seminar transcripts, such as Frogs into Princes, which sold more than 270,000 copies. According to court documents relating to an intellectual property dispute between Bandler and Grinder, Bandler made more than $800,000 in 1980 from workshop and book sales.

A community of psychotherapists and students began to form around Bandler and Grinder's initial works, leading to the growth and spread of NLP as a theory and practice. For example, Tony Robbins trained with Grinder and utilized a few ideas from NLP as part of his own self-help and motivational speaking programmes. Bandler led several unsuccessful efforts to exclude other parties from using NLP. Meanwhile, the rising number of practitioners and theorists led NLP to become even less uniform than it was at its foundation. Prior to the decline of NLP, scientific researchers began testing its theoretical underpinnings empirically, with research indicating a lack of empirical support for NLP's essential theories. The 1990s were characterized by fewer scientific studies evaluating the methods of NLP than the previous decade. Tomasz Witkowski attributes this to a declining interest in the debate as the result of a lack of empirical support for NLP from its proponents.

== Main components and core concepts ==
According to Bandler and Grinder, people experience the world subjectively, creating internal representations of their experiences. These representations involve the five senses and language. In other words, our conscious experiences take the form of sights, sounds, feelings, smells, and tastes. When we imagine something, recall an event, or think about the future, we utilize these same sensory systems within our minds. (Note: Dilts et al. 1980, pp. 13–14: "There are three characteristics of effective patterning in NLP which sharply distinguish it from behavioural science as it is commonly practiced today. First, for a pattern or generalization regarding human communication to be acceptable or well–formed in NLP, it must include in the description the human agents who are initiating and responding to the pattern being described, their actions, their possible responses. Secondly, the description of the pattern must be represented in sensory grounded terms which are available to the user. This user–oriented constraint on NLP ensures usefulness. We have been continually struck by the tremendous gap between theory and practice in the behavioural sciences—this requirement closes that gap. Notice that since patterns must be represented in sensory grounded terms, available through practice to the user, a pattern will typically have multiple representation—each tailored for the differing sensory capabilities of individual users [...] Thirdly, NLP includes within its descriptive vocabulary terms which are not directly observable [i.e. representational systems].") Furthermore it is stated that these subjective representations of experience have a discernible structure, a pattern.

Bandler and Grinder assert that behavior (both our own and others') can be understood through these sensory-based internal representations. Behavior here includes verbal and non-verbal communication, as well as effective or adaptive behaviors and less helpful or "pathological" ones. (Note: Dilts et al. (1980), p. 36: "The basic elements from which the patterns of human behaviour are formed are the perceptual systems through which the members of the species operate on their environment: vision (sight), audition (hearing), kinesthesis (body sensations) and olfaction/gustation (smell/taste). The neurolinguistic programming model presupposes that all of the distinctions we as human beings are able to make concerning our environment (internal and external) and our behaviour can be usefully represented in terms of these systems. These perceptual classes constitute the structural parameters of human knowledge. We postulate that all of our ongoing experience can usefully be coded as consisting of some combination of these sensory classes.") They also assert that behavior in both the self and other people can be modified by manipulating these sense-based subjective representations. (Note: Dilts et al. (1980), p. 7: "NLP presents specific tools which can be applied effectively in any human interaction. It offers specific techniques by which a practitioner may usefully organize and re–organize his or her subjective experience or the experiences of a client in order to define and subsequently secure any behavioural outcome.")

NLP posits that consciousness can be divided into conscious and unconscious components. The part of our internal representations operating outside our direct awareness is referred to as the "unconscious mind". (Note: Dilts et al. 1980, pp. 77–80: "Strategies and representations which typically occur below an individual's level of awareness make up what is often called or referred to as the 'unconscious mind'.")

Finally, NLP uses a method of learning called "modeling", designed to replicate expertise in any field. According to Bandler and Grinder, by analyzing the sequence of sensory and linguistic representations used by an expert while performing a skill, it's possible to create a mental model that can be learned by others.

== Techniques or set of practices ==
An "eye accessing cue chart" as it appears as an example in Bandler & Grinder's Frogs into Princes (1979). The six directions represent "visual construct", "visual recall", "auditory construct", "auditory recall", "kinesthetic" and "auditory internal dialogue".

According to one study by Steinbach, a classic interaction in NLP can be understood in terms of several major stages including establishing rapport, gleaning information about a problem mental state and desired goals, using specific tools and techniques to make interventions, and integrating proposed changes into the client's life. The entire process is guided by the non-verbal responses of the client. The first is the act of establishing and maintaining rapport between the practitioner and the client which is achieved through pacing and leading the verbal (e.g., sensory predicates and keywords) and non-verbal behavior (e.g., matching and mirroring non-verbal behavior, or responding to eye movements) of the client.

Once rapport is established, the practitioner may gather information about the client's present state as well as help the client define a desired state or goal for the interaction. The practitioner pays attention to the verbal and non-verbal responses as the client defines the present state and desired state and any resources that may be required to bridge the gap. The client is typically encouraged to consider the consequences of the desired outcome, and how they may affect their personal or professional life and relationships, taking into account any positive intentions of any problems that may arise. The practitioner thereafter assists the client in achieving the desired outcomes by using certain tools and techniques to change internal representations and responses to stimuli in the world. Finally, the practitioner helps the client to mentally rehearse and integrate the changes into their life. For example, the client may be asked to envision what it is like having already achieved the outcome.

According to Stollznow, "NLP also involves fringe discourse analysis and 'practical' guidelines for 'improved' communication. For example, one text asserts 'when you adopt the "but" word, people will remember what you said afterwards. With the "and" word, people remember what you said before and after.'"

== Applications ==
=== Alternative medicine ===
NLP has been promoted as being able to treat a variety of diseases including Parkinson's disease, HIV/AIDS and cancer. Such claims have no supporting medical evidence. People who use NLP as a form of treatment risk serious adverse health consequences as it can delay the provision of effective medical care.

=== Psychotherapeutic ===
Early books about NLP had a psychotherapeutic focus given that the early models were psychotherapists. As an approach to psychotherapy, NLP shares similar core assumptions and foundations in common with some contemporary brief and systemic practices, such as solution focused brief therapy. NLP has also been acknowledged as having influenced these practices with its reframing techniques which seeks to achieve behavior change by shifting its context or meaning, for example, by finding the positive connotation of a thought or behavior.

The two main therapeutic uses of NLP are, firstly, as an adjunct by therapists practicing in other therapeutic disciplines and, secondly, as a specific therapy called Neurolinguistic Psychotherapy.

According to Stollznow, "Bandler and Grinder's infamous Frogs into Princes and their other books boast that NLP is a cure-all that treats a broad range of physical and mental conditions and learning difficulties, including epilepsy, myopia and dyslexia. With its promises to cure schizophrenia, depression and Post Traumatic Stress Disorder, and its dismissal of psychiatric illnesses as psychosomatic, NLP shares similarities with Scientology and the Citizens Commission on Human Rights (CCHR)." A systematic review of experimental studies by Sturt et al. (2012) concluded that "there is little evidence that NLP interventions improve health-related outcomes." In his review of NLP, Stephen Briers writes, "NLP is not really a cohesive therapy but a ragbag of different techniques without a particularly clear theoretical basis ... [and its] evidence base is virtually non-existent." Eisner writes, "NLP appears to be a superficial and gimmicky approach to dealing with mental health problems. Unfortunately, NLP appears to be the first in a long line of mass marketing seminars that purport to virtually cure any mental disorder ... it appears that NLP has no empirical or scientific support as to the underlying tenets of its theory or clinical effectiveness. What remains is a mass-marketed serving of psychopablum."

André Muller Weitzenhoffer—a friend and peer of Milton Erickson—wrote, "Has NLP really abstracted and explicated the essence of successful therapy and provided everyone with the means to be another Whittaker, Virginia Satir, or Erickson? ... [NLP's] failure to do this is evident because today there is no multitude of their equals, not even another Whittaker, Virginia Satir, or Erickson. Ten years should have been sufficient time for this to happen. In this light, I cannot take NLP seriously ... [NLP's] contributions to our understanding and use of Ericksonian techniques are equally dubious. Patterns I and II are poorly written works that were an overambitious, pretentious effort to reduce hypnotism to a magic of words."

Clinical psychologist Stephen Briers questions the value of the NLP maxim—a presupposition in NLP jargon—"there is no failure, only feedback". Briers argues that the denial of the existence of failure diminishes its instructive value. He offers Walt Disney, Isaac Newton and J.K. Rowling as three examples of unambiguous acknowledged personal failure that served as an impetus to great success. According to Briers, it was "the crash-and-burn type of failure, not the sanitised NLP Failure Lite, i.e. the failure-that-isn't really-failure sort of failure" that propelled these individuals to success. Briers contends that adherence to the maxim leads to self-deprecation. According to Briers, personal endeavour is a product of invested values and aspirations and the dismissal of personally significant failure as mere feedback effectively denigrates what one values. Briers writes, "Sometimes we need to accept and mourn the death of our dreams, not just casually dismiss them as inconsequential." Briers also contends that the NLP maxim is narcissistic, self-centered and divorced from notions of moral responsibility.

=== Other uses ===
Although the original core techniques of NLP were therapeutic in orientation their generic nature enabled them to be applied to other fields. These applications include persuasion, sales, negotiation, management training, sports, teaching, coaching, team building, public speaking, and in the process of hiring employees.

== Scientific criticism ==
In the early 1980s, NLP was advertised as an important advance in psychotherapy and counseling, and attracted some interest in counseling research and clinical psychology. However, as controlled trials failed to show any benefit from NLP and its advocates made increasingly dubious claims, scientific interest in NLP faded.

Numerous literature reviews and meta-analyses have failed to show evidence for NLP's assumptions or effectiveness as a therapeutic method. (Note: See, for instance, the following: Sharpley, 1984 and 1987; Druckman and Swets, 1988; Heap, 1988; von Bergen et al., 1997; Druckman, 2004; Witkowski, 2010) While some NLP practitioners have argued that the lack of empirical support is due to insufficient research which tests NLP, (Note: See the following: Einspruch and Forman, 1985; Murray, 2013; Sturt et al., 2012; Neuro-Linguistic Programming and Research; Tosey and Mathison, 2010) the consensus scientific opinion is that NLP is pseudoscience (Note: See the following: Witkowsi, 2010; The Skeptic's Dictionary, 2009; Beyerstein, 1990; Corballis, in Della Sala and Anderson, 2012; Singer and Lalich; Lilienfeld, Lynn and Lohr, 2004; Della Sala, 2007; Williams, 2000; Lum, 2001; Lilienfeld, Lohr and Morier, 2001; Dunn, Halonen and Smith, 2008; Molfese, Segalowitz and Harris, 1988) (Note: For a description of the social influence tactics used by NLP and similar pseudoscientific therapies, see Devilly, 2005) and that attempts to dismiss the research findings based on these arguments "[constitute]s an admission that NLP does not have an evidence base and that NLP practitioners are seeking a post-hoc credibility."

Surveys in the academic community have shown NLP to be widely discredited among scientists. (Note: In 2006, Norcross and colleagues found NLP to be given similar ratings as dolphin-assisted therapy, equine-assisted therapy, psychosynthesis, scared straight programmes, and emotional freedom technique. In 2010, Norcross and colleagues listed it as seventh out of their list of ten most discredited drug and alcohol interventions. Glasner-Edwards and colleagues also identified it as discredited in 2010.) Among the reasons for considering NLP a pseudoscience are that evidence in favor of it is limited to anecdotes and personal testimony that it is not informed by scientific understanding of neuroscience and linguistics, and that the name "neuro-linguistic programming" uses jargon words to impress readers and obfuscate ideas, whereas NLP itself does not relate any phenomena to neural structures and has nothing in common with linguistics or programming. (Note: For more information on the use of neuroscience terms to lend the appearance of credibility to arguments, see Weisburg et al., 2008) In education, NLP has been used as a key example of pseudoscience.

== As a quasi-religion ==
Sociologists and anthropologists have categorized NLP as a quasi-religion belonging to the New Age and/or Human Potential Movements.

Medical anthropologist Jean M. Langford categorizes NLP as a form of folk magic; that is to say, a practice with symbolic efficacy—as opposed to physical efficacy—that is able to effect change through nonspecific effects (e.g., placebo). To Langford, NLP is akin to a syncretic folk religion "that attempts to wed the magic of folk practice to the science of professional medicine".

Bandler and Grinder were influenced by the shamanism described in the books of Carlos Castaneda. Concepts like "double induction" and "stopping the world", central to NLP modeling, were incorporated from these influences.

Some theorists characterize NLP as a type of "psycho-shamanism", and its focus on modeling has been compared to ritual practices in certain syncretic religions. The emphasis on lineage from an NLP guru has also been likened to similar concepts in some Eastern religions. Aupers, Houtman, and Bovbjerg identify NLP as a New Age "psycho-religion". Bovbjerg argues that New Age movements center on a transcendent "other". While monotheistic religions seek communion with a divine being, this focus shifts inward in these movements, with the "other" becoming the unconscious self. Bovbjerg posits that this emphasis on the unconscious and its hidden potential underlies NLP techniques promoting self-perfection through ongoing transformation.

Bovbjerg's secular critique echoes the conservative Christian perspective, as exemplified by David Jeremiah. He argues that NLP's emphasis on self-transformation and internal power conflicts with the Christian belief in salvation through divine grace.

== Legal disputes ==
=== Founding, initial disputes, and settlement (1979–1981) ===
In 1979, Richard Bandler and John Grinder established the Society of Neuro-Linguistic Programming (NLP) to manage commercial applications of NLP, including training, materials, and certification. The founding agreement conferred exclusive rights to profit from NLP training and certification upon Bandler's corporate entity, Not Ltd. Around November 1980, Bandler and Grinder had ceased collaboration for undisclosed reasons.

On September 25, 1981, Bandler filed suit against Grinder's corporate entity, Unlimited Ltd., in the Superior Court of California, County of Santa Cruz seeking injunctive relief and damages arising from Grinder's NLP-related commercial activities; the Court issued a judgment in Bandler's favor on October 29, 1981. The subsequent settlement agreement granted Grinder a 10-year license to conduct NLP seminars, offer NLP certification, and utilize the NLP name, subject to royalty payments to Bandler.

=== Further litigation and consequences (1996–2000) ===
Bandler commenced further civil actions against Unlimited Ltd., various figures within the NLP community, and 200 initially unnamed defendants in July 1996 and January 1997. Bandler alleged violations of the initial settlement terms by Grinder and sought damages of no less than US$10,000,000.00 from each defendant.

In February 2000, the Court ruled against Bandler. The judgment asserted that Bandler had misrepresented his exclusive ownership of NLP intellectual property and sole authority over Society of NLP membership and certification.

=== Trademark revocation (1997) ===
In December 1997, a separate civil proceeding initiated by Tony Clarkson resulted in the revocation of Bandler's UK trademark of NLP. The Court ruled in Clarkson's favor.

=== Resolution and legacy (2000) ===
Bandler and Grinder reached a settlement in late 2000, acknowledging their status as co-creators and co-founders of NLP and committing to refrain from disparaging one another's NLP-related endeavors.

Due to these disputes and settlements, the terms "NLP" and "neuro-linguistic programming" remain in the public domain. No single party holds exclusive rights, and there are no restrictions on offering NLP certifications.

The designations "NLP" and "neuro-linguistic programming" are not owned, trademarked, or subject to centralized regulation. Consequently, there are no restrictions on individuals self-identifying as "NLP master practitioners" or "NLP master trainers". This decentralization has led to numerous certifying associations.

=== Decentralization and criticism ===
This lack of centralized control means there is no single standard for NLP practice or training. Practitioners can market their own methodologies, leading to inconsistencies within the field. This has been a source of criticism, highlighted by an incident in 2009 where a British television presenter registered his cat with the British Board of Neuro Linguistic Programming (BBNLP), demonstrating the organization's lax credentialing. Critics like Karen Stollznow find irony in the initial legal battles between Bandler and Grinder, considering their failure to apply their own NLP principles to resolve their conflict. Others, such as Grant Devilly, characterize NLP associations as "granfalloons"—a term implying a lack of unifying principles or a shared sense of purpose.

== See also ==
- Avatar Course
- Brain training
- Family systems therapy
- Frank Farrelly
- List of New Age topics
- List of unproven and disproven cancer treatments
- Solution-focused brief therapy
