= Richard Bandler =

American writer (born 1950)

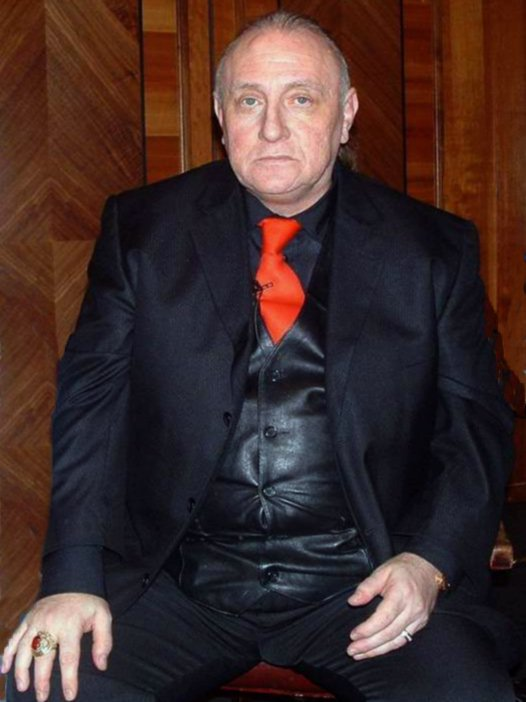
- Born: Richard Wayne Bandler; 1950 (age 75–76); Teaneck, New Jersey, United States
- Occupations: Writer, consultant, public speaker
- Known for: co-creator of neuro-linguistic programming (NLP)
- Website: richardbandler.com

Richard Wayne Bandler (born 1950) is an American writer, consultant, and public speaker in the field of self-help. With John Grinder, he founded the neuro-linguistic programming (NLP) approach to psychotherapy in the 1970s.

== Early life and education ==
Richard Wayne Bandler was born in Teaneck, New Jersey and attended high school in Sunnyvale, California. He has stated that he was beaten as a child so badly that every bone in his body was broken. After his parents separated, he moved with his mother and stayed mostly in and around San Francisco. Bandler obtained a BA degree in philosophy and psychology from the University of California, Santa Cruz (UCSC) in 1973, and an MA degree in psychology from Lone Mountain College in San Francisco in 1975.

== Neuro-linguistic programming ==
Bandler helped publisher Robert S. Spitzer (of Science and Behavior Books, Inc.) edit The Gestalt Approach (1973) based on a manuscript by gestalt therapist Fritz Perls (who had died in 1970). He also assisted with checking transcripts for Eye Witness to Therapy (1973). According to Spitzer, "[Bandler] came out of it talking and acting like Fritz Perls."

While a student at UCSC, Bandler also led a Gestalt therapy group. John Grinder, a professor at the University, said to Bandler that he could explain almost all the questions and comments Bandler made using transformational grammar. Grinder's specialty was in linguistics. Together, they created what they called a therapist training group. This was the basis for their first book, The Structure of Magic (1975). Bandler and Grinder claim to have later codified some of the foundational models for neuro-linguistic programming in part by studying the methods of Milton Erickson and Virginia Satir.

== Murder trial and acquittal ==
In 1986, Corine Ann Christensen (December 8, 1954 – November 3, 1986), a former girlfriend of Bandler's friend and cocaine dealer, James Marino, was shot dead in her Santa Cruz townhouse with a .357 magnum owned by Bandler. Authorities charged Bandler with her murder. Bandler testified that he had been at Christensen's house, but that Marino had shot Christensen. After a short deliberation, a jury found Bandler not guilty.

== Publications ==
- Bandler, Richard; Grinder, John (1975a). The Structure of Magic I: A Book About Language and Therapy. Palo Alto, CA: Science & Behavior Books. ISBN 0-8314-0044-7.
- Grinder, John; Bandler, Richard (1975b). Patterns of the Hypnotic Techniques of Milton H. Erickson, M.D. Vol. I. Cupertino, CA: Meta Publications.
- Bandler, Richard; Grinder, John (1976a). The Structure of Magic II: A Book About Communication and Change. Palo Alto, CA: Science & Behavior Books. ISBN 0-8314-0049-8.
- Bandler, Richard; Grinder, John; Satir, Virginia (1976b). Changing with Families: A Book About Further Education for Being Human. Vol. I. Palo Alto, CA: Science & Behavior Books. ISBN 0-8314-0051-X.
- Grinder, John; Bandler, Richard; DeLozier, Judith (1977). Patterns of the Hypnotic Techniques of Milton H. Erickson, M.D. Vol. II. Cupertino, CA: Meta Publications.
- Grinder, John; Bandler, Richard (1979). Frogs into Princes: Neuro Linguistic Programming. Moab, UT: Real People Press. ISBN 0-911226-19-2.
- Grinder, John; Bandler, Richard (1981). Andreas, Connirae (ed.). Trance-Formations: Neuro-Linguistic Programming and the Structure of Hypnosis. Moab, UT: Real People Press. ISBN 0-911226-23-0.
- Grinder, John; Bandler, Richard (1982). Reframing: Neurolinguistic programming and the transformation of meaning. Moab, UT: Real People Press. ISBN 0-911226-25-7.
- Bandler, Richard (1985). Using Your Brain for a Change. Real People Press. ISBN 0-911226-27-3.
- Bandler, Richard; MacDonald, Will (1988). An Insider's Guide To Sub-Modalities. Meta Publications. ISBN 0-916990-22-2.
- Bandler, Richard (1992). Magic in Action. Meta Publications. ISBN 0-916990-14-1.
- Bandler, Richard (1993). Time for a Change. Meta Publications. ISBN 0-916990-28-1.
- Bandler, Richard (1993). The Adventures of Anybody. Meta Publications. ISBN 0-916990-29-X.
- Bandler, Richard; La Valle, John (1996). Persuasion Engineering. Meta Publications. ISBN 978-0-916990-36-7.
- Bandler, Richard (2008). Get The Life You Want: The Secrets to Quick and Lasting Life Change with Neuro-Linguistic Programming. HCi. ISBN 978-0-7573-0776-8.
- Bandler, Richard (2008). Richard Bandler's Guide to Trance-formation: How to harness the power of hypnosis to ignite effortless and lasting change. HCi. ISBN 978-0-7573-0777-5.
- Bandler, Richard; Fitzpatrick, Owen (2009). Conversations with Richard Bandler: Two NLP Masters Reveal the Secrets to Successful Living (Freedom Is Everything and Love Is All the Rest). Health Communications. ISBN 978-0-9551353-0-9.
- Bandler, Richard; Thomson, Garner (2011). The Secrets of Being Happy: The Technology of Hope, Health, and Harmony. IM Press. ISBN 978-0-9827804-0-4.
- Bandler, Richard; Roberti, Alessio; Fitzpatrick, Owen (2013). The Ultimate Introduction to NLP: How to build a successful life. HarperCollins. ISBN 978-0-00-749741-6.
- Bandler, Richard; Fitzpatrick, Owen; Roberti, Alessio (2014). How to Take Charge of Your Life: The User's Guide to NLP. HarperCollins. ISBN 978-0-00-755593-2.
- Bandler, Richard; Benson, Kate (2016). Teaching Excellence. Bandler Benson Publications. ISBN 978-0-9956406-0-3.
- Bandler, Richard; Bradstock, Glenda; Fitzpatrick, Owen (2019). Thinking on Purpose, a 15 Day Plan to a Smarter Life. New Thinking Publications. ISBN 978-0-9987167-3-2.
