= Eve Lipchik =

American psychotherapist

Eve Lipchik (born August 2, 1931) is an Austrian-American psychologist. She was a member of the original team in the development of Solution-Focused Brief Therapy (SFBT). The practice is a goal-directed collaborative approach to psychotherapeutic change that is conducted through direct observation of clients' responses to a series of precisely constructed interview questions. Lipchik is a certified member and approved supervisor of the American Association for Marriage and Family Therapy, as well as co-founder of ICF Consultants, Inc., in Milwaukee, Wisconsin. After retiring from active practice, Lipchik has taught, lectured and consulted in the United States, Canada, Europe, Asia and Australia.

== Early life and education ==
Lipchik was born in Vienna, Austria, to Austrian-Jewish parents, Walter and Lily (Loebel) Seuer. She escaped the Nazi persecution and emigrated to the United States in 1940. At age 16, she received a bachelor's degree in English literature from New York University in 1951. For several years Lipchik worked in television production and as a translator. She pursued a postgraduate degree from University of Rochester in 1976 where she worked in play therapy. She also graduated with a masters in social work from the University of Wisconsin–Milwaukee in 1978.

== Career ==
During her time earning her postgraduate degree at the University of Rochester, she interned as a child aide for Primary Mental Health Project, Rochester. Following that, she interned for Family Services of Milwaukee from 1978 to 1980. Once licensed, she was a family therapist and associate director at Brief Family Therapy Center in Milwaukee from 1980 to 1988. She served as vice president and co-founder of ICF Consultants, Inc, Milwaukee, starting in 1988. Lipchik then took on a role as a clinical supervisor for Milwaukee Women's Center. She was a consultant at the Home and Community Treatment program in Washington County, Wisconsin, since 1986 and Ozaukee County, Wisconsin, from 1986 to 1989. Lipchik is also trained and certified in Eye Movement Desensitization and Reprocessing (EMDR).

=== Solution-focused brief therapy ===
In 1978 Lipchik trained under supervisor Insoo Kim Berg at Family Service of Milwaukee, where she learned of some experimental work that was happening after-hours. Upon completion of her training, she joined as a member in the research and development of Solution-focused brief therapy; the efforts led by husband and wife Steve de Shazer and Insoo Kim Berg. Other members of the team were Jim Derks, Elam Nunnally, Marilyn LaCourt, as well as students Pat Bielke, Dave Pakenham, John Walter, Jane Peller, Elam Nunnally, Alex Molnar, and Michele Weiner-Davis. Eve and the team sat in on cases together, with one therapist conducting the interview and the others behind a one-way mirror.

What the team found in Solution-focused brief therapy, rather than identifying as a "therapist" or a "healer," was that therapists were encouraged to see themselves as professional collaborators. Instead, they concentrate on identifying clients' goals and developing a detailed description of life when the goal is reached, and the problem is either resolved or managed satisfactorily. To devise effective solutions, they examined clients' life experiences for "exceptions," or moments when some aspect of their goal was already happening to some extent. Eve brought in a unique emphasis on emotions and the importance of exploring those in SFBT.

== Personal life ==
Lipchik married Elliot O. Lipchik on August 30, 1953, and had three children. She lives in Milwaukee, Wisconsin, and is retired from active practice, but is still consults and provides SFBT training.

== Honors and awards ==
Lipchik has earned several awards for her research and clinical work, including recipient of the "Therapist of the Year" award from the Wisconsin Association for Marriage and Family Therapy and the Carl A. Whitaker Award. Other honors include the Distinguished Family Therapist Award from Edgewood College and an Honorary Fellowship from the Austrian Society for Systemic Therapy. In 2020, she won the Distinguished Contribution to Family Therapy Theory & Practice Award from the American Family Therapy Academy (AFTA).

== Selected publications ==
Lipchik has authored two books and more than 35 articles, books chapters, and online publications.

- Interviewing (1988)
- Beyond Technique in Solution-Focused Therapy: Working with Emotions and the Therapeutic Relationship (2011)
- Multifaceted Approaches in Spouse Abuse Treatment (2008)
- My Story About Solution-Focused Brief Therapist/Client Relationships (1997)
- A consumer's perspective on domestic violence interventions (1993)
- The integration of emotion in solution-focused therapy (1993)
- Brief Therapy: Focused Solution Development (1986)
- The Purposeful Interview (1986)

== See also ==
- Family therapy
- Future-oriented therapy
- Narrative therapy
- Response-based therapy
