= Clinical supervision =

Oversight of counsellors and psychotherapists

Supervision is used in counselling, psychotherapy, and other mental health disciplines as well as many other professions engaged in working with people. Supervision may be applied as well to practitioners in somatic disciplines for their preparatory work for patients as well as collateral with patients. Supervision is a replacement instead of formal retrospective inspection, delivering evidence about the skills of the supervised practitioners.

It consists of the practitioner meeting regularly with another professional, not necessarily more senior, but normally with training in the skills of supervision, to discuss casework and other professional issues in a structured way. This is often known as clinical or counselling supervision (consultation differs in being optional advice from someone without a supervisor's formal authority). The purpose is to assist the practitioner to learn from his or her experience and progress in expertise, as well as to ensure good service to the client or patient. Learning shall be applied to planning work as well as to diagnostic work and therapeutic work.

Derek Milne defined clinical supervision as: "The formal provision, by approved supervisors, of a relationship-based education and training that is work-focused and which manages, supports, develops and evaluates the work of colleague/s". The main methods that supervisors use are corrective feedback on the supervisee's performance, teaching, and collaborative goal-setting. It therefore differs from related activities, such as mentoring and coaching, by incorporating an evaluative component. Supervision's objectives are "normative" (e.g. quality control), "restorative" (e.g. encourage emotional processing) and "formative" (e.g. maintaining and facilitating supervisees' competence, capability and general effectiveness).

Some practitioners (e.g. art, music and drama therapists, chaplains, psychologists, and mental health occupational therapists) have used this practice for many years. In other disciplines the practice may be a new concept. For NHS nurses, the use of clinical supervision is expected as part of good practice. In a randomly controlled trial in Australia, White and Winstanley looked at the relationships between supervision, quality of nursing care and patient outcomes, and found that supervision had sustainable beneficial effects for supervisors and supervisees. Waskett believes that maintaining the practice of clinical supervision always requires managerial and systemic backing, and has examined the practicalities of introducing and embedding clinical supervision into large organisations such as NHS Trusts (2009, 2010). Clinical supervision has some overlap with managerial activities, mentorship, and preceptorship, though all of these end or become less direct as staff develop into senior and autonomous roles.

Key issues around clinical supervision in healthcare raised have included time and financial investment. It has however been suggested that quality improvement gained, reduced sick leave and burnout, and improved recruitment and retention make the process worthwhile.

== United Kingdom ==
Clinical supervision is used in many disciplines in the British National Health Service. Registered allied health professionals such as occupational therapists, physiotherapists, dieticians, speech and language therapists and art, music and drama therapists are now expected to have regular clinical supervision. C. Waskett (2006) has written on the application of solution focused supervision skills to either counselling or clinical supervision work. Practising members of the British Association for Counselling and Psychotherapy are bound to have supervision for at least 1.5 hours a month. Students and trainees must have it at a rate of one hour for every eight hours of client contact.

The concept is also well used in psychology, social work, the probation service and at other workplaces.

== United States ==
In the United States, clinical supervision is a condition of licensure rather than a continuing feature of practice. Counsellors, marriage and family therapists, clinical social workers and psychologists are licensed separately by each state, and every state requires a period of supervised post-degree experience before a practitioner may practise independently. The requirement is set by state statute and board rule and varies in length and composition: California, for example, requires 3,000 hours of post-master's supervised experience gathered over at least 104 weeks for licensure as a clinical social worker, of which at least 1,700 must be supervised by a licensed clinical social worker.

Boards also specify who may supervise. Some require the supervisor to hold a specific credential, such as the American Association for Marriage and Family Therapy's Approved Supervisor designation or the Approved Clinical Supervisor credential issued by the Center for Credentialing & Education. The American Psychological Association's guidelines treat supervision as a distinct professional competency and set expectations for supervisor training and for the supervisor's responsibility for client welfare. Once a practitioner is independently licensed, continuing supervision is generally not required by state boards, and the career-long supervision expected of members of bodies such as the British Association for Counselling and Psychotherapy is instead undertaken voluntarily or as peer consultation.

The word supervision carries a second and distinct meaning in American health law. Statutes and board rules use it for the oversight a physician provides to a nurse practitioner, physician assistant or pharmacist working under a written instrument, variously named a supervision agreement, a practice agreement, a written protocol, a delegation agreement or a prescriptive authority agreement. This is a division of legal responsibility and a condition of the second practitioner's licensure rather than the educational and reflective relationship described above. The instrument records the clinical duties delegated, any restriction on prescribing, and arrangements for consultation, referral and chart review; in most states it does not require the physician to be present at the practice site or to discuss individual cases. The requirement has been contested on competition and access grounds, and many states have narrowed or removed it for nurse practitioners since 2010.

== Models or approaches ==
There are many different ways of developing supervision skills which can be helpful to the clinician or practitioner in their work. Specific models or approaches to both counselling supervision and clinical supervision come from different historical strands of thinking and beliefs about relationships between people. A few examples are given below.

Peter Hawkins (1985) developed an integrative process model which is used internationally in a variety of helping professions. His "Seven Eyed model of Supervision" was further developed by Peter Hawkins along with Robin Shohet, Judy Ryde and Joan Wilmot in "Supervision in the Helping Professions" (1989, 2000 and 2006 and 2012) and with Nick Smith in "Coaching, Mentoring and organisational Consultancy: Supervision and Development" (2006 and 2013) and is taught on the courses of the Centre for Supervision and Team Development as well as many other supervision training courses.

S. Page and V. Wosket describe a cyclical structure.

F. Inskipp and B. Proctor (1993, 1995) developed an approach based on the normative, formative and restorative elements of the relationship between supervisor and supervisee. The Brief Therapy practice teaches a solution focused approach based on the work of Steve de Shazer and Insoo Kim Berg which uses the concepts of respectful curiosity, the preferred future, recognition of strengths and resources, and the use of scaling to assist the practitioner to progress (described in). Waskett has described teaching solution-focused supervision skills to a variety of professionals

Evidence-based CBT supervision is a distinctive and recent model that is based on cognitive-behaviour therapy (CBT), enhanced by relevant theories (e.g. experiential learning theory), expert consensus statements, and on applied research findings (Milne & Reiser, 2017). It is therefore an example of evidence-based practice, applied to supervision. CBT supervision meets the general definition of clinical supervision, adding some distinctive features that reflect CBT as a therapy. This includes a high degree of session structure and direction (e.g. detailed agenda-setting), but within a fundamentally collaborative relationship. Also, there is a primary emphasis on cognitive case conceptualization, mainly through the use of case discussion, intended to develop diagrammatic CBT formulations. But discussion should properly be combined with other CBT techniques, including Socratic questioning, guided discovery, educational role-play, behavioural rehearsal, and corrective feedback. Another distinctive aspect is a focus on evidence-based principles and methods, including the use of reliable instruments for feedback and evaluation, in relation to both therapy and supervision. Perhaps the single most defining characteristic of evidence-based CBT supervision is the active and routine commitment to research methods and findings: where other approaches refer to theory and clinical/supervisory experience for guidance, evidence-based CBT supervision appeals ultimately to 'the data'. Examples of the use of relevant theories, expert consensus statements and research, together with six formally-developed supervision guidelines (illustrated through video clips), can be found in Milne & Reiser (2017).

Deliberate practice supervision is a focused and structured approach where therapists continuously work on refining specific skills through targeted exercises and feedback. Supervisors help identify areas for improvement, set clear objectives, and provide real-time, constructive feedback. Based on the work of K. Anders Ericsson, deliberate practice supervision emphasizes repetitive practice and reflection to enhance clinical effectiveness and adaptability, ultimately aiming to bridge the gap between current capabilities and desired performance levels in therapeutic settings. Over 20 peer-reviewed empirical studies have examined the process and outcome of deliberate practice supervision. A review published in 2024 described two major models of deliberate practice supervision. The Better Results model, created by Scott Miller, Mark Hubble, and Daryl Chow, uses data from Feedback Informed Treatment to guide deliberate practice supervision. The Sentio Supervision Model, created by the Sentio Marriage and Family Therapy MA program in California, systematically integrates psychotherapy skill building with the use of clinical videos and outcome data to increase trainees' clinical competence and confidence.

Developmental models of supervision view supervisees as progressing through distinct stages of professional growth, requiring different types of supervision at each stage. Stoltenberg & Delworth’s Integrated Developmental Model (IDM) proposes three levels of supervisee development (beginner, intermediate, advanced), each with increasing autonomy and complexity in clinical skills. Loganbill, Hardy, & Delworth's developmental model describes cycles of stagnation, confusion, and integration as supervisees develop.

In the Discrimination Model of supervision by Janine Bernard, supervisors take on three roles: Teacher (instructing and guiding), Counselor (helping with emotional reactions), and Consultant (collaborative problem-solving), and focus on three skill areas: Process (e.g., interpersonal dynamics), Conceptualization (understanding client issues), and Personalization (how the therapist uses themselves in therapy).

== Research on the effectiveness of supervision ==
Some studies have suggested that supervision may improve clinical effectiveness. Other studies have raised questions about the effectiveness of supervision. Three literature reviews of research in this topic raised concerns about the reliability of these findings and voiced caution in assuming that supervision may improve clinical effectiveness.

== Training in supervision ==
Counselling or clinical supervisors will be experienced in their discipline and normally then have further training in any of the above-mentioned approaches, or others. The guidelines of the American Psychological Association, American Counseling Association, and American Association for Marriage and Family Therapists provide standards for supervisor competence and training. There are many different ways of developing supervision skills which can be helpful to the clinician or practitioner in their work. Training programs in psychology, counseling, social work, and other allied fields often provide graduate-level coursework in supervision. Post-graduate supervisor training is also offered, often by non-profit organizations. For example, the non-profit Sentio Counseling Center offers a one-year Deliberate Practice supervisor training program that provides over 50 hours of video-based training in Deliberate Practice supervision methods, aiming to enhance supervisory skills through close mentorship with experienced trainers.

== See also ==
- The works of Lawrence Shulman
- Behavioral psychotherapy
