= Michele Weiner-Davis =

American family therapist and writer

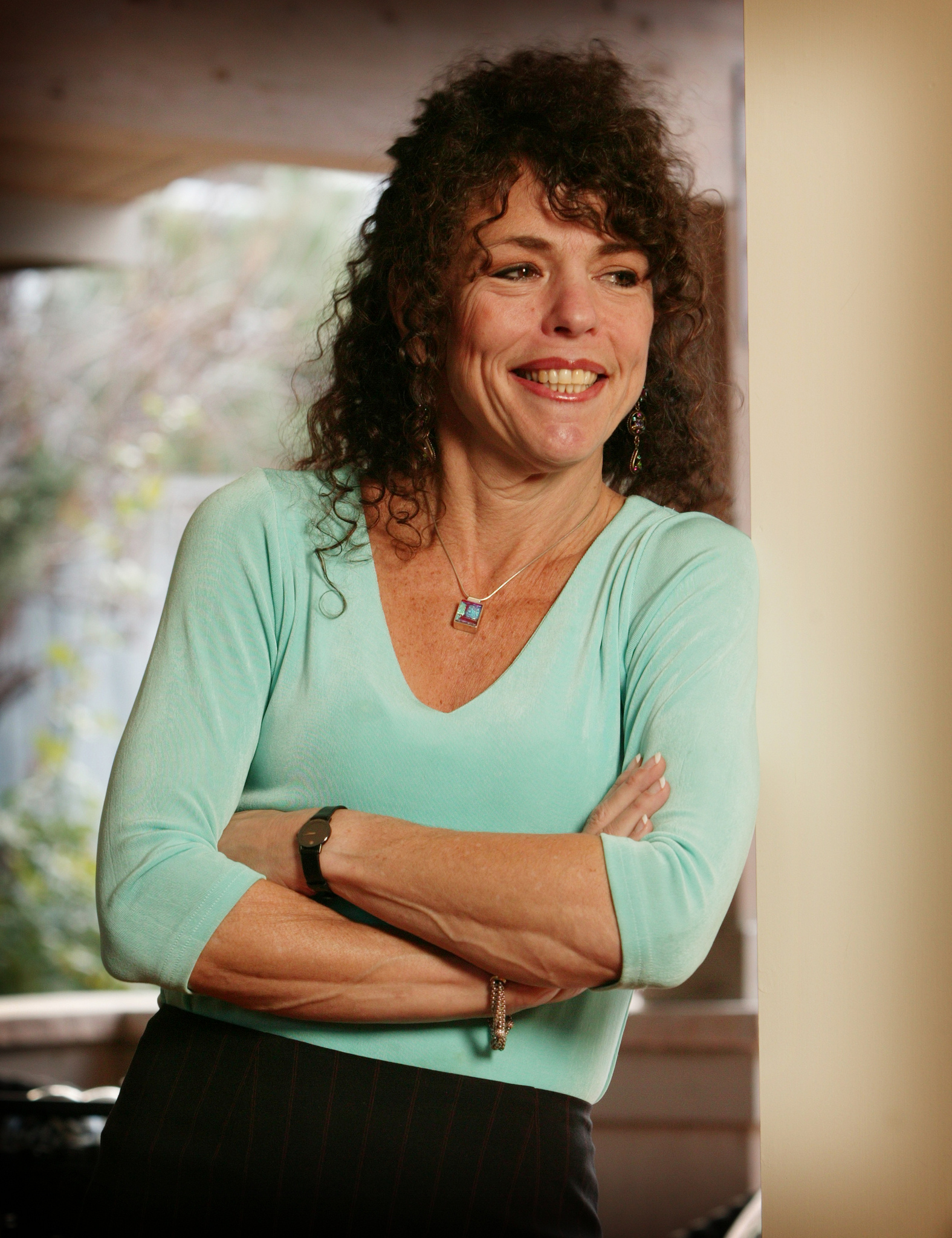
- Michele Weiner-Davis in 2007
- Born: New York City, New York
- Education: Grinnell College, University of Kansas
- Occupations: marriage therapist, author
- Known for: Solution-focused brief therapy, Divorce Busting
- Website: www.DivorceBusting.com

Michele Weiner-Davis is a licensed clinical social worker, marriage and family therapist and author in the field of family therapy. She is frequently quoted in the media and has been interviewed significantly on television news programs regarding divorce prevention. Weiner-Davis has often been referred to as The Divorce Buster after coining the term “divorce busting” at an American Association for Marriage and Family Therapy conference in 1989. She currently writes a regular column, Divorce Busting: Musings From an Unabashed Marriage Saver in Psychology Today.

== Personal life ==
'''Weiner-Davis''' was born on March 27, 1951, in New York City where she grew up along with two brothers. She has described her young childhood as idyllic, similar to the "Walton Family". During Weiner-Davis' senior year in high school, her parents divorced after twenty-three years of marriage. Her mother had been speaking with a therapist for several years, and she had been advised by the therapist that the differences between her and her husband were irreconcilable. Because of her parents' divorce, and due to the fact that many family counselors considered divorce to be a therapeutic option as a first resort in the 1960s, Weiner-Davis became a believer in the sanctity of marriage and a champion for saving the relationships of others.

Weiner-Davis has two children, a son and a daughter, and has been married since 1977.

== Career ==
Weiner-Davis received a Bachelor of Arts degree in 1973 from Grinnell College. She then earned a Master's Degree in Social Work (MSW) in 1977 from the University of Kansas. She began her early career in private practice, counseling young couples with relationship issues. During this time in her career, she believed that a separation was inevitable if one spouse had pre-determined that they wanted a divorce. In those situations, Weiner-Davis would counsel the couples on how to make the divorce easier on the family.

During the 1980s, while working with the McHenry County Youth Service Bureau in Woodstock, Illinois, she became involved with Steve de Shazer and Insoo Kim Berg and his team at The Brief Family Therapy Center in Milwaukee, Wisconsin. She was part of the group of researchers that made contributions in the field of psychotherapy to help develop what is known as Solution Focused Brief Therapy (SFBT).

During this period of her career, after her publications in the Journal of Marital & Family Therapy, she wrote her first book on divorce prevention: Divorce Busting, published in 1992. She opened her first Divorce Busting Center in Woodstock, Illinois. After moving to Boulder, Colorado, she opened her second Divorce Busting Center where she continues to see individuals and couples as a marriage and family therapist. Weiner-Davis says her patients are usually out of therapy in about six visits, while many marriage therapies last months or years. She advocates an action-based approach and asks each partner in a marriage to "provide what the other needs regardless of whether the giver understands it". She launched an online marital support website, Divorcebusting.com in June 1998. It attracts thousands of people each day. Her free Open Messageboard web forums gives the public a place and a way to communicate with Weiner-Davis and has become a place of last resort for many couples before they end up in divorce court.

Weiner-Davis is a clinical member and approved supervisor for the American Association for Marriage and Family Therapy Therapists from many countries come to the U.S. for her professional training seminars and some of her books and publications based on SFBT are used by university professors and professional organizations for classroom and continuing education credits. She also works directly over the phone with couples from many countries including Hong Kong, Singapore, India and Japan.

She is also involved in education and support in supplying advice for several online internet groups including Redbook, Planet-Therapy.com, IVillage, and The National Registry of Marriage Friendly Therapists.

Weiner-Davis was a State-of-the-Art Faculty presenter in 2005 and in 2009 for the Evolution of Psychotherapy Conference that is held every five years by The Milton H Erickson Foundation.

Weiner-Davis maintains a private practice in Woodstock, Illinois.

== Books ==
In 1989 Weiner-Davis co-authored her first book, In Search of Solutions:A New Direction in Psychotherapy with Bill O'Hanlon. This book was aimed at practicing psychotherapists and based on the principles of Solution focused brief therapy (SFBT), which is said to have derived in part from the influence and work of Milton H. Erickson and their research from the Brief Family Therapy Center. A revised second edition of the book In Search of Solutions, which contained new material in the advances in the field of (SFBT), was re-released in 2003.

After years of experience in private practice Weiner-Davis came to the conclusion that in many cases divorced couples were merely exchanging one set of problems for another. She desired to translate the principles of (SFBT) into everyday English and to spread the word of its effective use, believing that most marriages are worth saving and their problems solvable. To accomplish this goal she wrote the self-help book Divorce Busting: A Step-By-Step Approach to Making Your Marriage Loving Again. The book challenged mainstream psychotherapeutic techniques at the time and gave her national recognition as a notable therapist in family therapy. Weiner-Davis believed that far from the traditional fairy-tale notion of "happily ever after," successful marriages involve working through and surviving problems, setbacks, and conflicts to become stronger. The core of the book's principles is that even if only one spouse desired to save the relationship or make a change, a marriage could be saved.

In 1996 Weiner-Davis released her third book, Change Your Life and Everyone In It: How to. It was written in order to expand upon the other more personal issues outside of relationships that she believed an effective (SFBT) approach might be able to solve or help with. The book used real life case examples of past experiences she had seen during therapy over the years in helping others to deal with personal problems caused by stress, depression and anxiety. The book was originally released in 1995 with the title Fire Your Shrink! before being renamed. She outlines techniques which break with traditional psychotherapy and focuses on finding solutions rather than root causes of problems. Weiner Davis said her practice focuses on the future rather than the past and commented that: "Analyzing the past can be enlightening and educational, but can be a complete waste of time....This should not be called psychotherapy. It's a process of change, not introspection".

In 1999 Weiner-Davis wrote her 4th book Getting Through to the Man You Love:The No-Nonsense, No-Nagging Guide for Women. This book was written for women in an attempt to help women get through to their spouse more effectively. The book was based on both personal experiences during therapy with women and the trend in divorce rates that show women file for divorce two-thirds of the time.

In 2001 Weiner-Davis released a sequel to Divorce Busting, The Divorce Remedy:The Proven 7-Step Program for Saving Your Marriage. After hearing from thousands of readers over the years who asked particular questions about their own marital circumstances, Weiner-Davis extracted the ideas from her experience and past books and then broke down the ideas into seven specific steps a person could follow. She also discusses some other key relationship issues such as depression, infidelity, Internet obsession, sexual problems & midlife crisis.

In 2003 Weiner-Davis released her book The Sex-Starved Marriage: A Couple's Guide to Boosting Their Marriage Libido. She found herself writing about this particular subject after she saw a pattern developing in her practice and determined that a lack of physical intimacy between couples had been leading couples further apart. The book was written in order to take a more proactive stance to help married couples achieve better relationships before their love fades.

Her book The Sex-Starved Wife: What to Do When He's Lost Desire was released in 2008. The book was undertaken after Weiner-Davis was inundated with telephone calls and letters from many women who said they were having this issue within their marriage and were seeking information to resolve the issue with their husbands. To help determine the extent of the issue Weiner-Davis did a study with the help of Redbook which showed that two-thirds of the women who responded said they desired sex at least as much or more as their husbands did.

Weiner-Davis' latest book Healing From Infidelity: The Divorce Busting Guide to Rebuilding Your Marriage After an Affair was released in January 2017. Due to the high percentage of couples in her practice who face betrayal, she developed a step-by-step program for rebuilding trust and reinventing couples' marriages. The book, though intended for the general public is considered a useful resource for the therapists who treat them.

== In mass media ==
Weiner-Davis made her first television appearance on the talk show Donahue, reporting that 85% of the couples using the methods and advice of Solution-Focused Brief Therapy (SFBT) were leaving from her therapy with their marriages intact.

She also made two other guest appearances on the talk show The Oprah Winfrey Show, discussing how the innovative but simple methods of SFBT could save relationships and make marriages stronger, contending that a person did not need a degree in psychology in order to improve their marriage.

The success of Weiner-Davis last two books, The Sex-Starved Marriage and The Sex-Starved Wife, led Weiner-Davis to appear on several television news programs including Today, ABC News 20/20, The CBS Early Show, The O'Reilly Factor, and PBS.

Over the span of her career Weiner-Davis has been interviewed and referred to in newspaper and magazine articles including The New York Times, Time, Los Angeles Times, Chicago Tribune, Newsweek, USA Today, Cosmopolitan, Daily News, The Washington Times, U.S. News & World Report.

Weiner-Davis has also been involved in a reality based show for the BBC about helping couples save their marriages.

She also gave a TED Talk on "The Sex-Starved Marriage" in 2014 that has over five million views.

== Recognition ==
Weiner-Davis, along with 21 other American therapists, was profiled in the 2003 book Bad Therapy: Master Therapists Share Their Worst Failures by Jeffrey Kottler and Jon Carlson. In it Weiner-Davis describes how she could sometimes tend to focus more on technique as a young therapist and then how she eventually learned from those experiences with couples how to become a better therapist.

Weiner-Davis received an award for Outstanding Contribution to Marriage and Family Therapy in 2001 from The American Association for Marriage and Family Therapy, which represents the professional interests of more than 24,000 marriage and family therapists throughout the United States, Canada and abroad.

Weiner-Davis received an Impact Award during the 7th Annual Smart Marriages Conference (The Coalition for Marriage, Family, and Couples Education) in 2003. According to their website, "the Impact Awards are presented to those whose research, books, political or grassroots action, leadership and brilliant reconceptualizations have given us new hope about reversing the epidemic of divorce and family breakdown".

Weiner-Davis received The Washington Times Inaugural Founding Spirit Award in 2007 recognizing her work in community activism.
