= Gracia McGrath =

Gracia McGrath OBE
- Born: 20 July 1961 (age 63); Birkenhead, Cheshire, England
- Education: Holt Hill Convent
- Occupation: CEO of Chance UK
- Years active: 2001-present
- Awards: OBE
- Website: www.chanceuk.com -->

Gracia Mary McGrath O.B.E. (born 20 July 1961) is the former chief executive officer of London-based charity Chance UK.

== Biography ==
Gracia McGrath was born on 20 July 1961, in Birkenhead, Cheshire (now Merseyside), the youngest of eight children to Denis and Mary McGrath. She attended Holt Hill Convent but was expelled for an argument with the head teacher at 16. Encountering problems in her own school life, she was influenced to work with children with behavioural difficulties who undoubtedly experienced similar problems.

=== Work for Chance UK ===
McGrath has worked in the voluntary sector for more than 20 years. She became CEO of Chance UK in 2001, which has grown significantly under her leadership. It runs a pioneering franchise scheme that sees the Chance UK programme run in partnership with other organisations across the UK.

== Recognition ==
In 2009, McGrath received an O.B.E. for services to children with special needs.
