= Islington Town Hall =

Municipal building in London, England

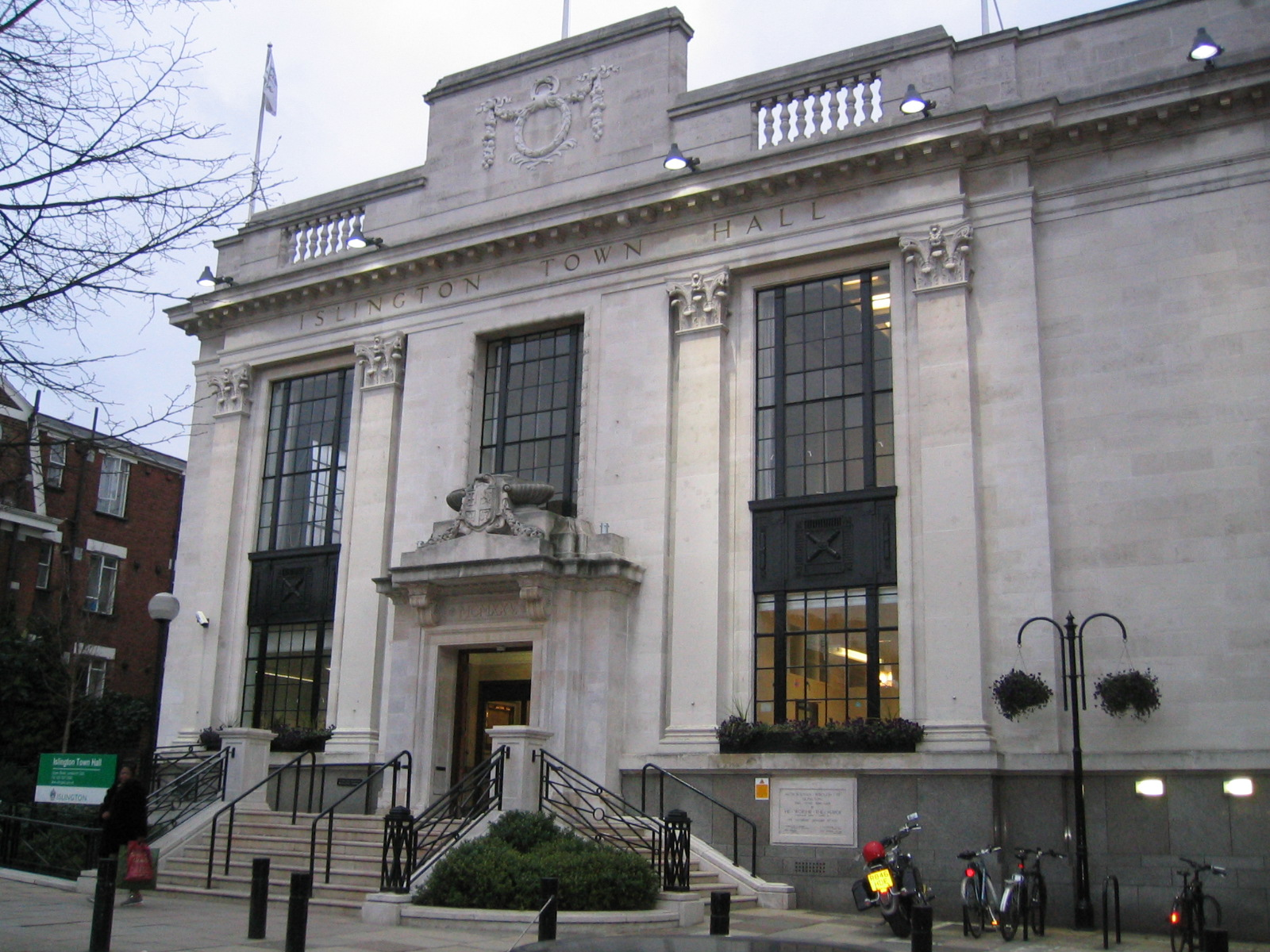
- Islington Town Hall

- Shown in Islington
- 51.5417°N 0.1024°W
- Location: Upper Street, Islington

History
- Built: 1930

Site notes
- Architect: Edward Charles Philip Monson
- Architectural style: Neoclassical style

Listed Building – Grade II
- Designated: 30 September 1996
- Reference no.: 1297950

Islington Town Hall is a municipal facility in Upper Street, Islington, London. The town hall, which is the headquarters for Islington London Borough Council, is a Grade II listed building.

== History ==
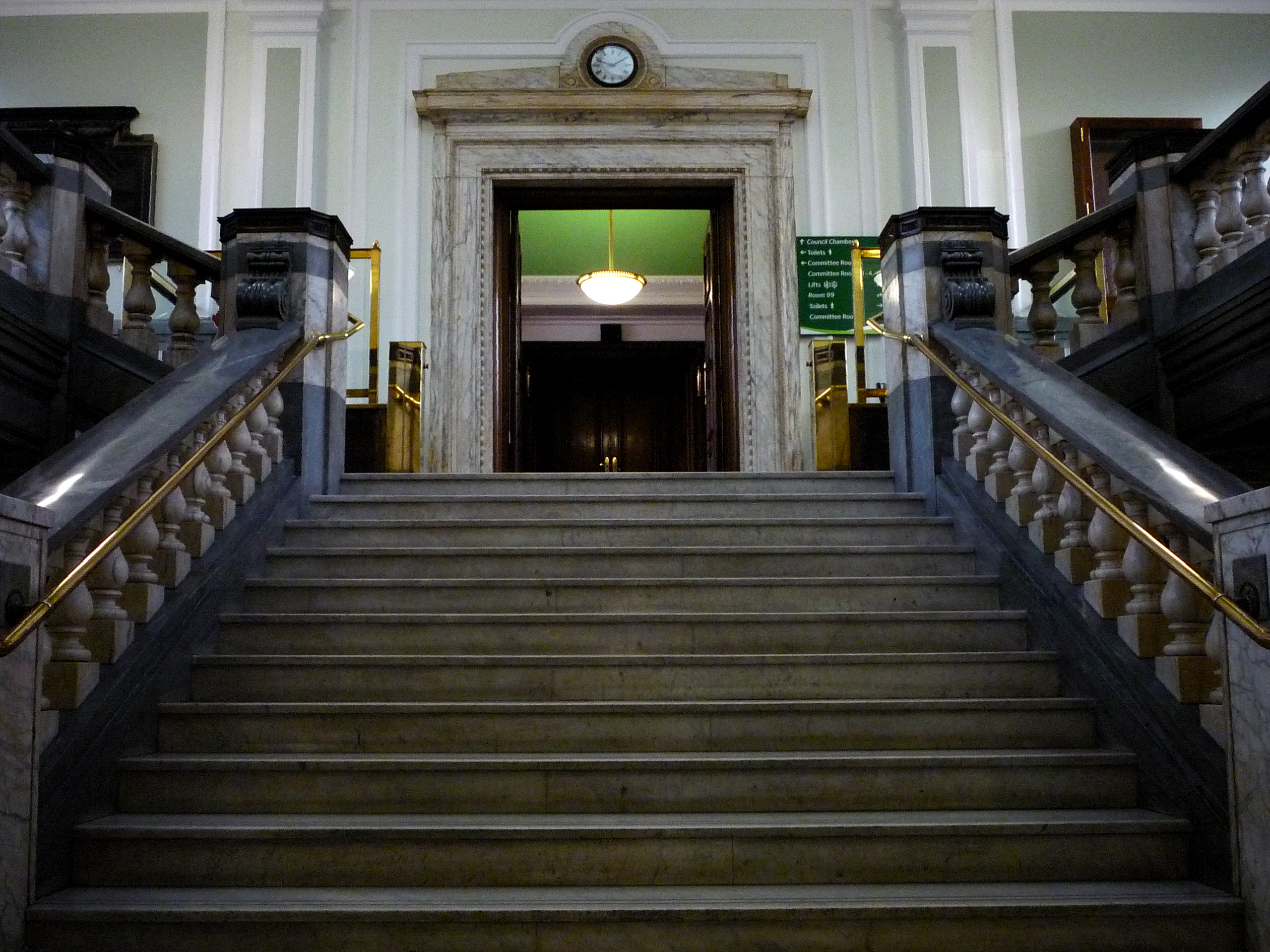
The stairs leading up to the council chamber

The building was commissioned to replace the ageing mid-19th century vestry hall on Upper Street which had been used by the Parish of St Mary's, Islington. The vestry hall had become the headquarters of the Metropolitan Borough of Islington in 1900. After the vestry hall had become inadequate for the council's needs, civic leaders decided to procure a new town hall; they purchased a 136,000 square feet (12,600 m^{2}) site with a row of Georgian era terraced houses known as Tyndale Place for this purpose in 1920.

The new building was designed by Edward Charles Philip Monson in the neoclassical style and built in three stages: first the rear wing facing Richmond Grove in 1922, second the northern part in Upper Street in 1925 and third the assembly hall in 1929. The complex was officially opened by the mayor, Alderman William Manchester, on 15 March 1930.

The design for the northern section involved a symmetrical main frontage with three bays facing onto Upper Street; it featured a stone porch with the borough coat of arms above flanked by full-height windows and Corinthian order pilasters to either side; there was also a window in a similar style on the first floor above the doorway. The principal rooms were the mayor's parlour, which was in the rear wing facing Richmond Grove, and the council chamber, which was in the northern part in Upper Street. Pevsner was impressed by the "lavish marble imperial stair to the octagonal council chamber".

Since 1930, when Arsenal won their first FA Cup against Huddersfield Town, victory receptions have been held at the town hall. Queen Elizabeth II visited the town hall and met with civic leaders to mark her coronation in 1953.

The building served as the town hall of the Metropolitan Borough of Islington and continued to serve as the local seat of government after Islington London Borough Council was formed in 1965. However, the council moved many of its officers and their departments to new municipal offices designed by T P Bennett on the opposite side of Upper Street in 1983. Other developments in the 1980s included an underground bunker constructed for protection against nuclear attack.

Islington Museum, which had previously been based in the town hall, moved out of the building in preparation for its move to Finsbury Library in December 2006. The town hall hosted a high-profile reception, attended by the Duchess of Cambridge, to promote Chance UK's early intervention child mentoring program in October 2015.
