= Feedback informed treatment =

Behavioral Health intervention

- Specialty: Behavioral health
- Uses: Assessing and improving the therapeutic relationship and progress of care
- [edit on Wikidata]

Feedback Informed Treatment (FIT) is an empirically supported, pantheoretical approach for evaluating and improving the quality and effectiveness of behavioral health services, originally developed by psychologist Scott D. Miller. It involves routinely and formally soliciting feedback from clients regarding the therapeutic relationship and progress of care and using the resulting information to inform and tailor service delivery.

FIT utilizes empirically validated, client-rated measurement tools at each session. Although any validated measures could be used, due to their brevity, the Outcome Rating Scale (ORS) and Session Rating Scale (SRS) are commonly employed by FIT Practitioners. The ORS measures the client’s therapeutic progress while asking about their level of distress and functioning. The SRS measures the quality of the therapeutic relationship.

A number of studies and meta-analyses have demonstrated the benefit of routinely monitoring and using client outcome data and feedback to inform care. Studies using the ORS and SRS document:

- Improved client outcomes (27%)
- Increased client retention
- Reduction of deterioration rates (50%)
- Shortening the length of time spent in care

== Relationship to therapist development and deliberate practice ==
A central question in psychotherapy research is whether therapists improve in effectiveness over the course of their careers. Studies of therapist effects have repeatedly documented substantial differences among individual therapists in the clinical outcomes their clients achieve. A large longitudinal study analyzing outcomes from over 6,500 patients treated by 170 therapists found that patient outcomes did not improve with accumulated therapist experience and showed a small but statistically significant decline over time. However, a companion study at a different agency that had integrated routine outcome monitoring into supervision and deliberate practice of therapeutic skills found small but statistically significant improvements in therapist effectiveness over time. A subsequent randomized clinical trial also found that the positive effects of routine outcome monitoring increased as training and supervisory support for its use increased.

These findings contributed to growing interest in integrating client outcome data into clinical supervision and training. Miller and Hubble argued that clinical mastery begins with establishing a baseline of one's own effectiveness through outcome data, then using that baseline to pinpoint specific areas of deficit and design targeted practice activities accordingly. In graduate training contexts, this framework can be applied by having trainees collect and review outcome data on their own caseloads under supervision, using the data to set individualized learning goals, and structuring practice activities around identified growth areas. This approach transforms routine clinical work into a vehicle for deliberate skill development rather than mere accumulation of hours. Researchers have described strategies for using outcome monitoring in supervision, including training students to obtain and use objective client feedback and identifying patterns across clients to guide supervisee development. Broader frameworks have proposed using FIT data as the basis for a cyclical process of therapist development, in which outcome and alliance measures identify areas for improvement that then become the focus of structured skill practice. In this approach, tools such as the ORS and SRS serve not only as clinical decision aids but also as a performance measurement system for ongoing professional development. Some graduate training programs integrate FIT and deliberate practice into their curricula. One example of this integration is the Sentio University Marriage and Family Therapy program, a nonprofit graduate institution in Los Angeles, California. Sentio's curriculum is built around the "Clinic-to-Classroom" method, in which real FIT data from the program's integrated training clinic are brought directly into the classroom to inform deliberate practice skills training.
