= Chance UK =

British charity

- Type: Charity
- Founded: 1995
- Headquarters: London, United Kingdom
- Services: Early Intervention
- Website: www.chanceuk.com

Chance UK is a British charity that is based around early intervention in order to prevent crime and anti-social behaviour, providing mentors to children with behavioural difficulties. Based in London, England, it and has helped over 800 children since its 1995 founding. Chance UK is the only organisation in the UK to offer a year of weekly one-to-one mentoring with children aged between five and twelve.

== History ==
Chance UK was set up by policeman Russ Horne who was working in Islington in 1995. He worked with young offenders, and noticed that many of the children he encountered went on to be early entrants to the youth justice system. He started with the belief that with better role models, people who nurtured the child's best qualities and believed in them, young people could be steered away from a life of criminal and anti-social behaviour.

A small amount of pump-priming funding, just £28,000 to cover the first years costs, was received from the Cripplegate Foundation and Sir John Cass Foundation. The steering committee, made up of Russ and a number of others, drawn from the Educational Welfare Department, the Police service, and Neighborhood Service, recruited Dave Conroy as its first employee. He set up the charity and designed its 'solution focused' approach to early intervention, based on the pioneering work of Steve de Shazer and his wife Insoo Kim Berg. Additional funding was received at the end of 1995 through a Home Office 'reducing criminality' initiative which enabled the fledgling charity to pilot its approach over the following three years.

Dave ran the charity from February 1995 to October 1999, supported by two co-ordinators, Jenny van Dyk and Bev Light, several social work placement students and some irregular volunteer office support. For the first several months CHANCE UK operated from a desk located in the offices of the Safer Islington Partnership. As Dave says, 'on my first day I turned up and was shown a desk, phone and empty in-try, nothing else existed but Russ's idea!'. From 1999 Balwant Singh was Chief Executive Officer, finishing in 2001 when Gracia McGrath O.B.E. took over as CEO of the charity.

== Funding ==
Chance UK is a registered UK charity (charity no. 1046947), therefore the funding comes from a variety of sources, including direct from Councils and Boroughs, fund raising, BBC Children in Need, partner charities and philanthropic donations.

== Major awareness campaigns ==
=== The Big Influence ===
During October and November 2010, Chance UK ran The Big Influence campaign, encouraging celebrities and the general public to speak about who influenced them as a child. The campaign's aim was to highlight the positive impact that adults had on the lives of the celebrities when they were young, and to encourage people to become that positive influence for today's children. Some Notable celebrities that took part in the campaign included Nick Jonas, Jamie Oliver, Paloma Faith and Jo Brand.

=== Christopher Eccleston’s BBC Radio 4 Appeal ===
On 8 September 2011, Christopher Eccleston made an appeal on behalf of Chance UK for BBC Radio 4. During the 3 minute broadcast Eccleston highlighted the important work the charity does with young children.

== Evaluation and success ==
In 2008, the Department of Psychology at Goldsmiths, University of London completed an independent evaluation of Chance UK's London work. They found that:

- 98% of children showed reductions in levels of behavioural difficulty
- 51% showed no behavioural difficulty at all by the end of the mentoring year

=== Recognition and awards ===
Chance UK has received several awards for its work with children, including:

- Queen's Golden Jubilee Award for Voluntary Service 2006
- Mentor UK Alcohol Misuse Prevention Award 2006
- Judges for 2006 Longford Prize - Honorable Mention for Outstanding Work in the Fields of Prison and Social Reform
- Children and Young People's Services Awards 2008 – Preventative Work Award
- CSJ Awards 2009
- Neighbourhood Builder Awards 2010 – Neighbourhood Excellence Initiative
- Britain's Most Admired Charities – Most Innovative Charity 2011
