= Divorce Busting =

Book by Michele Weiner-Davis

- Author: Michele Weiner-Davis
- Language: English
- Subject: Divorce Marriage Self-help
- Publisher: Simon & Schuster
- Publication date: 1992
- Publication place: United States of America
- ISBN: 978-0-671-79725-6

Divorce Busting:A Step-By-Step Approach to Making Your Marriage Loving Again is a self-help book written by Michele Weiner-Davis.

The book, which became a bestseller, was inspired after obtaining positive results in therapy with married couples. The book also challenged mainstream psychotherapeutic techniques at the time.

Weiner-Davis maintains throughout the book that marriages are worth saving and when relationships are in a crisis situation an action-oriented approach needs to be taken in order to save the relationship. Success of the book Divorce Busting lead to the opening of the "Divorce Busting Center" that utilizes telephone coaching and free online community forums.
