= Solution-focused brief therapy =

Goal-directed approach to psychotherapy

Solution-focused (brief) therapy (SFBT) is a brief form of psychotherapy developed in the late 1970s and 1980s by Steve de Shazer and Insoo Kim Berg that focuses on helping clients identify goals and practical solutions rather than analyzing problems. SFBT focuses on addressing what clients want to achieve without exploring the history and provenance of problem(s). SF therapy sessions typically focus on the present and future, focusing on the past only to the degree necessary for communicating empathy and accurate understanding of the client's concerns.

SFBT is a future-oriented and goal-oriented interviewing technique that helps clients generate solutions to acute problems. Elliott Connie defines solution building as "a collaborative language process between the client(s) and the therapist that develops a detailed description of the client(s)' preferred future/goals and identifies exceptions and past successes". SFBT is strengths-based, focused on clients' strengths and resilience.

== General introduction ==
The solution-focused brief therapy approach grew from the work of American social workers Steve de Shazer, Insoo Kim Berg, and their team at the Milwaukee Brief Family Therapy Center (BFTC) in Milwaukee, Wisconsin. A private training and therapy institute, BFTC was started by dissatisfied former staff members from a Milwaukee agency who were interested in exploring brief therapy approaches then being developed at the Mental Research Institute (MRI) in Palo Alto, California. The initial group included married partners, Steve de Shazer and Insoo Berg, and Jim Derks, Elam Nunnally, Judith Tietyen, Don Norman, Marilyn La Court and Eve Lipchik. Their students included John Walter, Jane Peller, Michele Weiner-Davis and Yvonne Dolan. Steve de Shazer and Berg, primary developers of the approach, co-authored an update of SFBT in 2007, shortly before their deaths. SFBT evolved from the Brief Therapy that was practiced at MRI.

The solution-focused approach was developed inductively rather than deductively; Berg, de Shazer, and their team spent thousands of hours carefully observing live and recorded therapy sessions. Any behaviors or words on the part of the therapist that reliably led to positive therapeutic change on the part of the clients were painstakingly noted and incorporated into the SFBT approach. In most traditional psychotherapeutic approaches starting with Freud, practitioners assumed that it was necessary to make an extensive analysis of the history and cause of their clients' problems before attempting to develop any sort of solution. Solution-focused therapists see the therapeutic change process radically differently and informed by the observations of de Shazer, which recognize that although "causes of problems may be extremely complex, their solutions do not necessarily need to be".

SFBT might be best defined by what it does not do because SFBT presents an innovative and radically different approach from traditional psychotherapy. Traditional psychotherapy looks at how problems happen, manifest, and resolve. The problem-solving approach is influenced by the medical model, where the symptoms are assessed to diagnose and treat the malady. Outside of SFBT, the almost universal belief is that the clinician must define and understand the problem to help. To do this, the practitioner must develop some information about the nature of problems that they will help resolve and ask questions about the client's symptoms. The more common problem-solving approach includes a description of the problem, an assessment of the problem, and plan and execute interventions to resolve or mitigate the impact of the problem. This is followed by an evaluation determining the success of the intervention and follow-up if necessary.

SFBT posits that a therapist can help clients resolve their problems without identifying the details or source problem and completely avoids exploring the details and context of the problem. SFBT asserts focusing on the problem serves to shift the client away from the solution, based on a fundamental belief that the nature of the solution can be completely different from the problem. SFBT focuses on building solutions by conceptualizing a preferred future with clients. SFBT seeks to guide the client in generating alternatives to the problem, rather than identifying and eliminating the problem.

SFBT is strengths-based and supports clients' self-determination. Using the client's language, SFBT uses the client's perspective and fosters cooperation. SFBT is influenced by social constructivist ideas, emphasizing how meaning and solutions are shaped through language and interaction. The focus on the strengths and resources of clients is a factor in why some social workers choose SFBT.

SFBT is designed to help people change their lives in the fastest way possible. By finding and amplifying exceptions, change is efficient and effective. Treatment usually lasts less than six sessions, and it can work in about two sessions. Its brevity and its flexibility have made SFBT the choice of intervention for many health care settings. Interventions in a medical setting many times need to be brief. Agencies also choose SFBT because its efficiency translates into monetary savings.

== History ==
Solution-focused brief therapy is one of a family of approaches known as systems therapies that have been developed since the late 1970s, first in the US, and eventually evolving around the world, including Europe. The title SFBT, and the specific steps involved in its practice, are attributed to husband and wife Steve de Shazer and Insoo Kim Berg, two American social workers, and their team at the Brief Family Therapy Center (BFTC) in Milwaukee, US. Core members of this team were Jim Derks, Elam Nunnally, Marilyn LaCourt, and Eve Lipchik as well as students Pat Bielke, Dave Pakenham, John Walter, Jane Peller, Alex Molnar, and Michele Weiner-Davis. Wallace Gingerich and Gale Miller joined a few years later as research assistants.

In the 1970s, de Shazer, Berg, and colleagues conducted Brief Family Therapy at Family Service of Milwaukee, a community agency, and installed one-way mirrors to observe sessions with clients to study which activities were most beneficial for the clients. The group of therapists used to meet in the couple's home, where a therapist saw clients pro bono in the living room while the others observed, after which they would discuss their thoughts together in a bedroom. In 1978, when the administration disallowed the one-way mirrors, de Shazer and Berg put together a team of practitioners and students and founded the Brief Family Therapy Center in Milwaukee, Wisconsin, to continue their work. The result was the eventual development of SFBT. BFTC served as a research center to study, develop, and test techniques of psychotherapy to find those that are most efficient and effective with clients. Besides mental health professionals, the team included educators, sociologists, linguists, engineers, and philosophers. Steve de Shazer, the director of BFTC, referred to this group as a "therapeutic think tank". Over time people began to request training, so BFTC became a research and training center.

SFBT has its roots in brief family therapy, a type of family therapy practiced at the Mental Research Institute (MRI). In the 1970s, de Shazer, the primary creator of SFBT, studied the work done at MRI and founded BFTC to serve as "the MRI of the Midwest". John Weakland at MRI influenced him to develop simple techniques in brief goal-focused therapy, and at MRI he was introduced to the work of Milton Erickson which ultimately had a significant influence on the development of SFBT.

In 1982 there was the watershed moment where the founders of SFBT, Berg, de Shazer, and their team transformed their brief therapy practice to become solution-focused. A family came to be treated at the Milwaukee Brief Family Therapy. During the assessment, the family provided a list of 27 problems. The team was at a loss as to what to suggest the family try to do differently. They suggested that the family come back with a list of things they want to continue to happen. The effectiveness of this spontaneous intervention led to the understanding that the solution is not necessarily related to the problem. This was the beginning of solution-focused brief therapy.

SFBT practice began to be popularized starting in the late 1980s and experienced tremendous growth in its first 15–20 years. Their work in the early 1980s built on that of a number of other innovators, among them Milton Erickson and the group at the MRI – Gregory Bateson, Donald deAvila Jackson, Paul Watzlawick, John Weakland, Virginia Satir, Jay Haley, Richard Fisch, Janet Beavin Bavelas and others. SFBT gained popularity in the UK in the late 1990s and the 2000s. At that time, it also spread worldwide to be a leading brief therapy, with many agencies adopting SFBT as their only modality.

== SFBT practice ==
In SFBT, practitioners employ conversational skills to facilitate a discussion focused on solutions, as opposed to dwelling on problems. The questions themselves serve as the intervention, directing clients toward a mindset that fosters positive change and reduces negative emotions. These questions help clients reinterpret their experiences, enabling them to recognize potential for change where they might not have seen it before.

The primary tools of the solution-focused approach are questions and compliments. SFBT therapists refrain from making interpretations and rarely confront clients; rather, the client's ways of thinking are affirmed. Instead, they concentrate on identifying clients' goals and developing a detailed description of life when the goal is reached, and the problem is either resolved or managed satisfactorily. To devise effective solutions, they examine clients' life experiences for "exceptions," or moments when some aspect of their goal was already happening to some extent.

SFBT therapists believe personal change is constant. By helping clients identify positive directions for change and focusing on changes they wish to continue, SFBT therapists assist clients in constructing a concrete vision of a preferred future.

One way to understand SFBT is through the acronym MECSTAT, which stands for Miracle questions, Exception questions, Coping questions, Scaling questions, Time-out, Accolades, and Task. SFBT questions prompt clients to discuss their preferred future and describe what would be different when the problem is solved or managed. The "miracle question" is one such tool, asking clients to imagine that their problem was miraculously solved without their knowledge and to identify the first clues that would indicate the problem is resolved.

Therapists also ask questions that focus on previous solutions or "exceptions" to the problem. In SFBT, exceptions are times when the problem is less severe or better managed. Identifying exceptions helps build solutions by highlighting what is working in clients' lives. By discovering and amplifying minor exceptions to the problem, therapists encourage clients to do more of what already works.

When seeking exceptions, the practitioner does not attempt to convince the client of their significance. Instead, the therapist adopts a genuinely curious stance and asks the client to explain the exception's importance. Therapists must maintain a not-knowing stance, which can be challenging for emerging SFBT practitioners.

SFBT practitioners use tools such as starting sessions with the question "What's been better since we last talked?" to help clients identify exceptions. Scaling questions are another tool, using a scale to measure clients' progress toward their goals. Clients are asked to provide details about times when the problem was less severe or absent and to identify behaviors that work for them.

SFBT sessions are highly structured, following a specific format and employing formulated interviewing techniques. However, adhering to the underlying philosophy of SFBT is considered more important than strictly following the techniques. Central to SFBT is the belief that clients are the experts in their lives and possess the knowledge necessary to achieve their goals. Therapists are considered experts in asking questions that evoke the change process.

Maintaining a curious and not-knowing stance is vital for effective SFBT. In authentic SFBT practice, practitioners treat client resistance as a signal to re-investigate the situation and alter their therapeutic approach. Despite its apparent simplicity, SFBT is difficult to master. It requires disciplined practice, which can be challenging for many practitioners. As a result, some may only use components of SFBT instead of using exclusively SFBT, often due to the difference from a problem-focused stance found in other therapeutic modalities. Conversely, new SFBT trainees may struggle with being overly optimistic and not genuinely validating clients' pain. This may be because concentrating on newly learned SFBT skills and techniques takes focus away from being present with the client.

Effective SFBT practice demands that therapists remain highly attuned to clients' verbal and non-verbal communication, adapting their questions to better understand and engage with the client's perspective. By doing so, SFBT practitioners can effectively facilitate client movement toward their goals and preferred futures.

== Evidence-based status ==
SFBT has been criticized as inadequately researched or evidence-based from its development through the early 2000s. A 2000 review of empirical SFBT research indicated preliminary support for the efficacy of SFBT. In 2010, research on SFBT grew to a level where the evidence was promising. From the mid-2010s, several meta-analyses have shown SFBT to be effective with internalizing issues. SFBT has a growing evidence base recommending it for use when deemed a good fit for the client and their problem; i.e., low-risk clients; with simple, acute, behaviourally-based problems; with strong solution-building capacities; and, no history of long-term mental health challenges.

SFBT has been examined in two meta-analyses and is supported as evidence-based by the United States SAMHSA's National Registry of Evidence-Based Programs & Practices (NREPP) and Canadian Centre for Innovation in Student Mental Health. The conclusion of the two meta-analyses and the systematic reviews supports solution-focused brief therapy as an effective approach to the treatment of mild psychological problems, with short-term effect sizes similar to other evidence-based approaches, such as CBT and IPT, found after an average of fewer sessions.

== Applications ==
SFBT is adaptable to low-risk patients in outpatient settings, including school- and workplace-based interventions. Practitioners take their language from the words the client uses to describe their life and preferred future. SFBT considers the client to be the expert. Practitioners present interventions drawn from clients' way of understanding and acting. Techniques such as the miracle question can be adapted to make them more culturally relevant and come across in ways more empathetic and supportive based on the culture and needs of the population being served.

SFBT can be applied to simple family-related situations. It is effective with adolescents, pregnant and postpartum people, couples, and parents. SFBT was shown to be effective for families in the child welfare system, with case management in social welfare programs, and with therapy groups for generalized anxiety disorder.

SFBT has been applied to many settings, including education and business, coaching, and counselling. It is effective in schools and with college students. It has been helpful with increasing sense of hope among family members of children with serious illnesses in China and Iran.

Translated and adapted forms of SFBT is effective with people in many countries and cultures, including people from Nigeria, Turkey, Chile, Korea, Iran, and China. A systematic review showed it to be effective with Latinos.

SFBT shows mixed results as a first-line treatment for people who experienced acute trauma. It has limited use with patients that are suicidal or in crisis families coping with suicide, and patients with eating disorders, substance use disorders, insomnia, and obesity. It was also suggested as a promising intervention for individuals with a brain injury and was helpful with those with intellectual disabilities.

SFBT is effective in treating clients with depression. It has been shown to be effective in helping increase self-esteem self-efficacy hope, good behavior, and social competence among adolescents and children.

Researchers have suggested SFBT's ability to engender hope is what makes it effective for patients suffering from depression, as the presence of hope is shown to have an inverse relationship with depression.

It has been shown to be effective at reducing perceived stigma and work-family conflict. It is effective at reducing vaccine refusal.

Workers with child protective services report in a qualitative study that integrating SFBT training and supervision was helpful for them to work in a more cooperative and strengths-based way and improved the overall mood and atmosphere of their encounters. Because SFBT alone does not take an authoritative approach, models designed for child protection services incorporate only some aspects of SFBT.

== See also ==
- Family therapy
- Future-oriented therapy
- Narrative therapy
- Response-based therapy
