= Lawrence Shulman =

Lawrence Shulman (born May 17, 1937) is the former Dean of the University at Buffalo, The State University of New York. His scholarship covers several subfields of social work, group work, supervision, child welfare, and teaching. Among his books are:

- The Skills of Helping: Individuals, Families, Groups and Communities,
- Interactional Supervision; and Mutual Aid Groups Vulnerable and Resilient Populations, and
- The Life Cycle.
