= Response-based therapy =

Form of psychotherapy

Response-Based Therapy is the application of response-based practice (abbreviated as RBP) in the area of therapy. The overall approach conceptualizes humans as active agents responding to and within richly complex social contexts. It is informed by social justice, and human rights. This approach leaves behind the radical, intra-psychic focus on the individual in isolation that is so common in psychology and psychotherapy. The therapeutic approach is a relatively new psychotherapeutic approach for responding to people who are experiencing difficulties of any sort (e.g., marriage, grief, victimization, perpetration of violence, etc.). The approach was developed in the 1990s by Allan Wade with contributions by Nick Todd and Linda Coates. The approach involves analyzing social interaction, social context, social responses, and how the individual is responding to and making sense of this complexly rich psycho-social situation.

The approach has been found to be extremely useful in working with victims and perpetrators of violence. Allan Wade is an expert in social interaction and this background allowed them to analyze what victims and perpetrator's actually do rather than accept widespread myths about what they are thought to do. Coates and Wade articulated the difference between mutual and unilateral acts and that violent acts are frequently misrepresented as mutual. In keeping with this, victim's are falsely understood as passive recipients of violence whereas they actually actively resist it (cf., "Small Acts of Living: Everyday Resistance to Violence and Other Forms of Oppression". However, after decades of practice and research, it has been shown that whenever people are mistreated, they resist.

The approach uses a client-based encompassing definition of resistance to allow for the fact that victims resist mentally, spiritually, physically, and psychologically. Resistance includes:

Any mental or behavioural act through which a person attempts to expose, withstand, repel, stop, prevent, abstain from, strive against, impede, refuse to comply with, or oppose any form of violence or oppression (including any type of disrespect), or the conditions that make such acts possible, may be understood as a form of resistance. Resistance is prudent—victims correctly anticipate that resistance will be met with escalated violence and abuse and so they tend to resist covertly.

This approach has been increasingly picked up around the world. The Calgary Women's Emergency Shelter website for example states:

"Whenever people are abused, they do many things to oppose the abuse and to keep their dignity and their self-respect. This is called resistance. The resistance might include not doing what the perpetrator wants them to do, standing up against, and trying to stop or prevent violence, disrespect, or oppression. Imagining a better life may also be a way that victims resist abuse." (Calgary Women's Emergency Shelter, 2007, p. 5).

In traditional therapies, professionals (and others) tend to focus on what the victim "didn't do" and blame the victims for being "passive" or failing to take certain actions (For example, not screaming for help). These approaches fail to take into account the details of the social context that factored into the victim's actual response. For example, a woman may be criticized for not crying out for help but when asked she explains she did not cry out for help because she wanted to protect children from witnessing the attack upon her.

In Response-Based Practice, the client is viewed as an "agent" who has the capability to respond to an act, and is acting in a social context. RBP focus on what the victim actually did. Example: the Response-Based Therapist would not ask a victim "How did that make you feel?", but instead would ask "When [act of violence] was done to you, how did you respond? What did you do?"

== Related reading ==
- Calgary Women's Emergency Shelter. (2007). Honouring Resistance: How Women Resist Abuse in Intimate Relationships (formerly Resistance to Violence and Abuse in Intimate Relationships: A Response-Based Perspective) Available from Calgary Women's Emergency Shelter, P.O. Box 52051 Edmonton Trail N., Calgary, Alberta T2E 8K9.
- Coates, L. & Wade, A. (2004). Telling It Like It Isn't: Obscuring Perpetrator Responsibility for Violent Crime. Discourse and Society, 15(5), 3-30.
- Coates, L. & Wade, A. (2007). Language and Violence: Analysis of Four Discursive Operations. Journal of Family Violence, 22(7), 511–522.
- Maddeaux-Young, H. N. (2006). Therapeutic Responses To Violence: A Detailed Analysis Of Therapy Transcripts. Master of Arts Thesis, University of Lethbridge, Department of Sociology. .
- Renoux, M. & Wade, A. (2008, June). Resistance to Violence: A Key Symptom of Chronic Mental Wellness. Context, 98, 2–4.
- Todd, N. and Wade, A. (2001). The Language of Responses Versus the Language of Effects: Turning Victims into Perpetrators and Perpetrators into Victims, unpublished manuscript, Duncan, British Columbia, Canada.
- Todd, N. & Wade, A. (2003). 'Coming to Terms with Violence and Resistance: From a Language of Effects to a Language of Responses', in T. Strong & D. Pare (eds), Furthering Talk: Advances in the Discursive Therapies, New York: Kluwer Academic Plenum.
- Wade, A. (1997). Small Acts of Living: Everyday Resistance to Violence and Other Forms of Oppression, Journal of Contemporary Family Therapy, 19, 23–40.
- Wade, A. (1999). Resistance to Interpersonal Violence: Implications for the practice of therapy. University of Victoria, Ph.D. Dissertation, Department of Psychology.
- Wade, A. (2007a). Despair, resistance, hope: Response-based therapy with victims of violence. In C. Flaskas, I. McCarthy, and J. Sheehan (Eds.), Hope and despair in narrative and family therapy: Adversity, forgiveness and reconciliation (pp. 63–74). New York, NY : Routledge/Taylor & Francis Group. HF
- Wade, A. (2007b). Coming to Terms with Violence: A Response-Based Approach to Therapy, Research and Community Action. Yaletown Family Therapy: Therapeutic Conversations.
- Weaver, J., Samantaraya, L., & Todd. N. (2005). The Response-Based Approach in Working with Perpetrators Of Violence: An Investigation. Calgary Women's Emergency Shelter
