= Insoo Kim Berg =

Korean American psychotherapist (1934–2007)

- Born: Insoo Kim(김인수); July 25, 1934; Korea
- Died: January 10, 2007 (aged 72); Milwaukee, United States
- Education: Ewha Womans University; University of Wisconsin-Milwaukee; Family Institute of Chicago; Menninger Foundation; Mental Research Institute
- Occupations: Psychotherapist, social worker
- Spouses: Charles H. Berg; Steve de Shazer

Insoo Kim Berg (25 July 1934 – 10 January 2007) was a Korean-born American psychotherapist and social worker who was a pioneer of solution focused brief therapy.

== Biography ==
Berg was born and raised in Seoul, Korea. She was a pharmacy major at Ewha Womans University in Seoul. In 1957, she travelled to the United States after her marriage to Charles Berg, to continue her studies. With her background in pharmacy, she worked as a tech, then worked in an animal lab, and worked with a stomach cancer researcher. She continued her studies in pharmacy and science because that is what her parents wanted, but then realized she could pick whatever she wanted, so went into social work. She began her studies at University of Wisconsin-Milwaukee in 1960, earning undergraduate and graduate degrees in social work. She subsequently began her social work practice in Milwaukee. Berg and her first husband, Charles, divorced in 1972. They have a daughter, Sarah K. Berg.

Berg completed post-graduate studies at the Family Institute of Chicago, the Menninger Foundation in Kansas, and the Mental Research Institute (MRI) in Palo Alto, California. At the MRI she also met her future husband, Steve de Shazer. She and Steve married in June 1977.

Berg died on January 10, 2007, in Milwaukee, at the age of 72.

== Solution-focused heritage ==
=== Solution-focused brief therapy ===
In 1978, Berg and de Shazer co-founded the Brief Family Therapy Center (BFTC) in Milwaukee. Berg was the executive director and a clinician at the BFTC. Berg and de Shazer are recognized as the primary developers of solution-focused brief therapy, which emerged from research they conducted at the BFTC in the 1980s, building upon studies conducted at the Mental Research Institute.

Berg led training workshops on solution-focused therapy in countries around the world, including Japan, South Korea, Denmark, Sweden, Norway, Russia, Israel, Australia, Singapore, United Kingdom, France, Switzerland and Germany. She authored a number of books on solution-focused approaches to therapy. Her books include Interviewing for Solutions (with Peter De Jong), Brief Coaching for Lasting Solutions, Family Based Services:A Solution Based Approach, Children's Solution Work (with Therese Steiner), Working with the Problem Drinker (with Scott D. Miller), Tales of Solution (with Yvonne Dolan), Building Solutions in Child Protective Services (with Susan Kelly), Solutions Step by Step:A Substance Abuse Treatment Manual (with Norman H. Ruess), and Brief Coaching for Lasting Solutions (with Peter Szabo).

== Works ==
- Berg, Insoo Kim, and Scott Miller. Working with the Problem Drinker: A Solution-focused Approach. New York: Norton, 1992. ISBN 978-0393701340
- Berg, Insoo Kim, Family-based Services: A Solution-focused Approach. New York: Norton, 1994. ISBN 978-0393701623
- Berg, Insoo Kim & Susan Kelly. Building Solutions in Child Protective Services. New York: Norton, 2000. ISBN 978-0393703108
- Berg, Insoo Kim & Yvonne M. Dolan. Tales of Solutions: A Collection of Hope-inspiring Stories. New York: Norton, 2001. ISBN 9780393703207
- Berg, Insoo Kim & Peter Szabó. Brief Coaching for Lasting Solutions. 2005. ISBN 9780393704723
- Berg, Insoo Kim & Therese Steiner. "Children's Solution Work". New York: Norton, 2003.ISBN 9780393703870
- Berg, Insoo Kim & Norman H. Reuss. "Solutions Step by Step: A Substance Abuse Treatment Manual. New York: Norton, 1998. ISBN 9780393702514
- De Jong, Peter & Insoo Kim Berg. Interviewing for Solutions(4th ed.) Pacific Grove, Calif.: Brooks/Cole, 2012. ISBN 978-1111722203

== See also ==
- Solution-focused brief therapy
