= Steve de Shazer =

American psychotherapist

Steve de Shazer (June 25, 1940, Milwaukee – September 11, 2005, Vienna) was a psychotherapist, author, and developer and pioneer of solution focused brief therapy. In 1978, he founded the Brief Family Therapy Center (BFTC) in Milwaukee, Wisconsin with his wife Insoo Kim Berg.

De Shazer was originally trained as a classical musician and worked as a jazz saxophonist. He received a Bachelor in Fine Arts and an MSSW in Social Work from the University of Wisconsin–Milwaukee. De Shazer wrote six books and was translated into 14 languages. He was a lifelong friend of John Weakland, whom he saw as his mentor.

De Shazer died in Vienna while traveling on a training and consulting tour in Europe from pneumonia. De Shazer has a nephew, Tony de Shazer whose wife is Marie Laure de Shazer, educator and author, and two great nieces Elodie and Amelie de Shazer.

== Solution-focused heritage ==
=== Solution-Focused Brief Therapy ===
In 1978, de Shazer and Insoo Kim Berg co-founded the Brief Family Therapy Center (BFTC) in Milwaukee. With this move, the couple are recognized as the primary developers of solution-focused brief therapy, which emerged from research they conducted at the BFTC in the 1980s, building upon studies conducted at the Mental Research Institute.

BFTC served as a research center to study, develop, and test techniques of psychotherapy to find those that are most efficient and effective with clients. The team at BFTC was very diverse, with practitioners with various backgrounds, educations, and academic disciplines. Besides mental health professionals, the team included educators, sociologists, linguists, and even engineers and philosophers. Steve de Shazer, the director of BFTC, referred to this group as a "therapeutic think tank". Over time people began to request training, so BFTC became a research and training center.
