= Santa Clara University =

Jesuit university in Santa Clara, California

Coordinates: 37°20′57″N 121°56′17″W

- Former names: Santa Clara College (1851), University of Santa Clara (1912–1984)
- Motto: Ad Majorem Dei Gloriam (Latin)
- Motto in English: For the Greater Glory of God
- Type: Private university
- Established: 1851; 175 years ago
- Religious affiliation: Catholic Church (Jesuit)
- Academic affiliations: AJCU; NAICU; ACCU; Space-grant
- Endowment: $1.555 billion (2024)
- President: Julie Sullivan
- Provost: James M. Glaser
- Faculty: 911 (564 full-time)
- Students: 9,635 (fall 2024)
- Undergraduates: 6,484
- Postgraduates: 3,151
- Other students: 281
- Location: Santa Clara, California, U.S.
- Campus: Suburban 106 acres (43 ha)
- Newspaper: The Santa Clara
- Colors: Red and white
- Nickname: Broncos
- Sporting affiliations: NCAA Division I – West Coast Conference
- Mascot: Bucky Bronco
- Website: scu.edu

Santa Clara University is a private Jesuit university in Santa Clara, California, United States. Established in 1851, Santa Clara University is the oldest operating institution of higher learning in California. The university's campus surrounds the historic Mission Santa Clara de Asís which traces its founding to 1777. The campus mirrors the Mission's architectural style and contains Mission Revival architecture and other Spanish Colonial Revival styles. The university is classified as a "Doctoral/Professional" university.

The university offers bachelor's degrees, master's degrees, and doctoral degrees through its six colleges, the College of Arts and Sciences, School of Education and Counseling Psychology, Leavey School of Business, School of Engineering, Jesuit School of Theology, and School of Law. It enrolls 6,484 undergraduate students and about 3,151 postgraduate students as of Fall 2024.

Santa Clara's sports teams are called the Broncos. Their colors are red and white. The Broncos compete at the NCAA Division I levels as members of the West Coast Conference in 19 sports. Broncos have won NCAA championships in both men's and women's soccer. Santa Clara's student athletes include current or former 58 MLB, 40 NFL, and 12 NBA players and 13 Olympic gold medalists.

== History ==
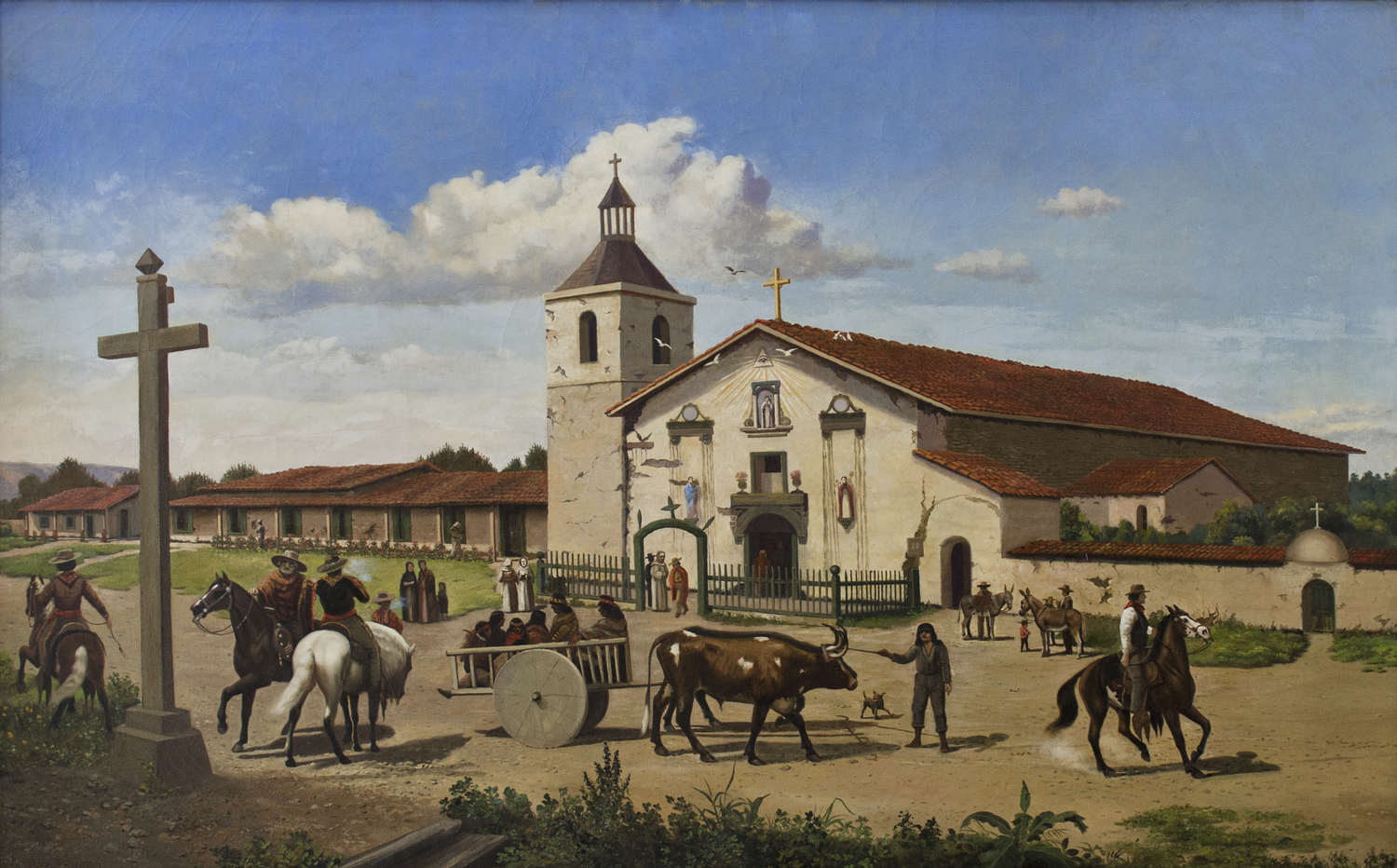
Mission Santa Clara de Asís, founded by the Spanish Empire in 1777

=== California mission era ===
Inheriting the grounds of Mission Santa Clara de Asís, Santa Clara University's campus, library holdings, art collection, and many of its defining traditions date back to 1777, almost 75 years before its founding. In January of that year, Saint Junipero Serra, a Spanish Franciscan friar, established Mission Santa Clara as the eighth of 21 Alta California missions. Fray Tomás de la Peña chose a site along the Guadalupe River for the future church, erecting a cross and celebrating the first Mass a few days later. The campus was built on the land of the Ohlone people who relocated after suffering a decline in population due to epidemics and a loss of natural resources in the area.

Natural disasters forced early priests to relocate and rebuild the church on several occasions, moving it westward and away from the river. Built of wood, the first permanent structure quickly flooded and was replaced by a larger adobe building in 1784. This building suffered heavy damage in an 1818 earthquake and was replaced six years later by a new adobe edifice.

=== Early college history ===
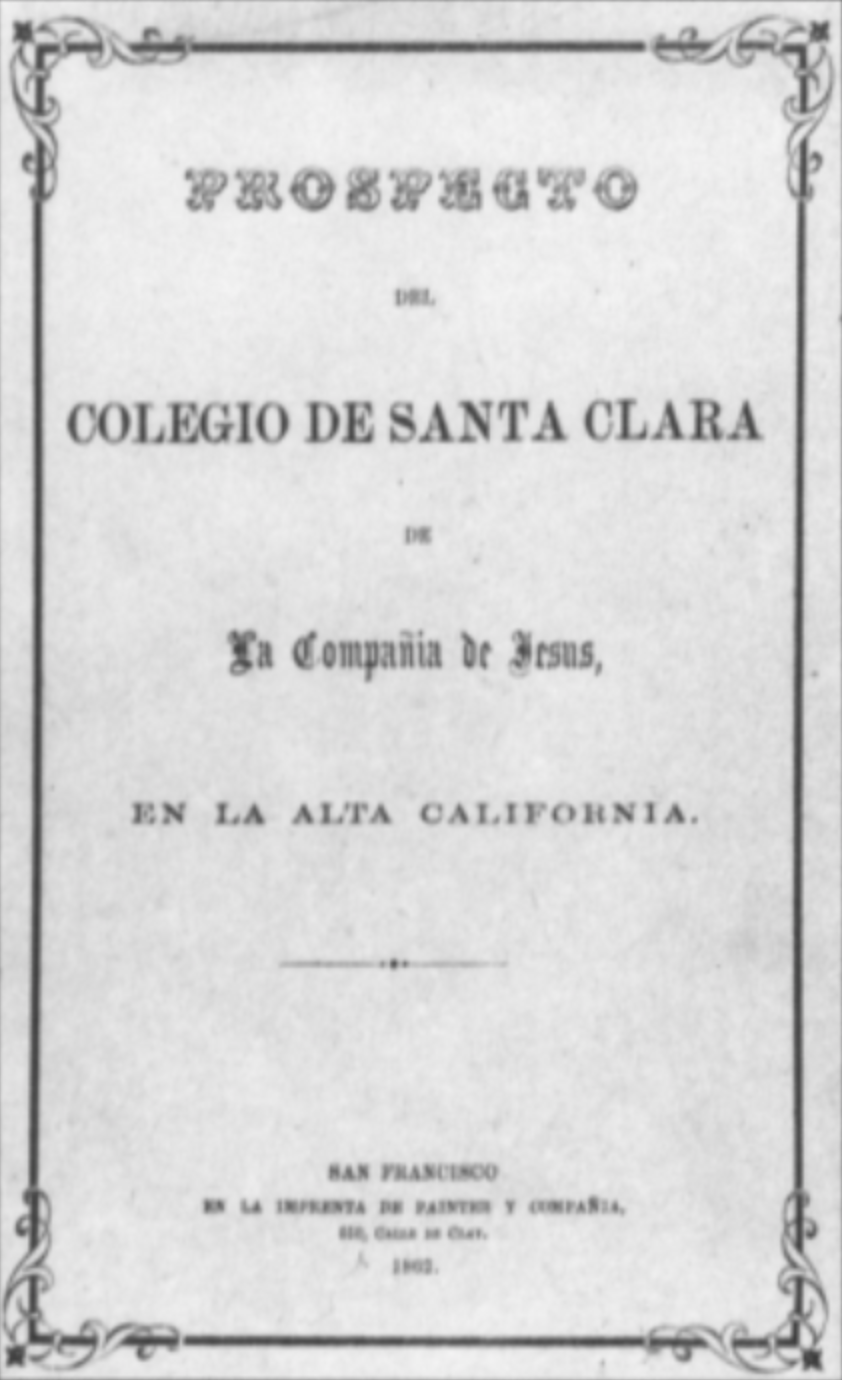
Prospectus in Spanish for the College of Santa Clara (Colegio de Santa Clara), published c. 1862

The mission flourished for more than 50 years despite these setbacks. Beginning in the 1830s, however, the mission lands were repossessed in conjunction with government policy implemented via the Mexico's secularization, and church buildings fell into disrepair. The bishop of Monterey, Dominican Joseph Sadoc Alemany, offered the site to Italian Jesuits John Nobili and Michael Accolti in 1851 on condition that they found a college for California's growing Catholic population when it became part of the United States following the Mexican–American War (1846–48).

Two colleges were organized during 1851 in the small agricultural town of Santa Clara, at the height of the Gold Rush, less than a year after California was granted statehood. Santa Clara College, forerunner of Santa Clara University, was the first to open its doors to students and is the state's oldest operating institution of higher education. Shortly after Santa Clara began instruction, the Methodist-run California Wesleyan College (now known as University of the Pacific) received a charter from the State Superior Court on July 10, 1851—the first granted in California—and it began enrolling students in May of the following year. Santa Clara's Jesuit founders lacked the $20,000 endowment required for a charter, which was eventually accumulated and a charter granted on April 28, 1855.

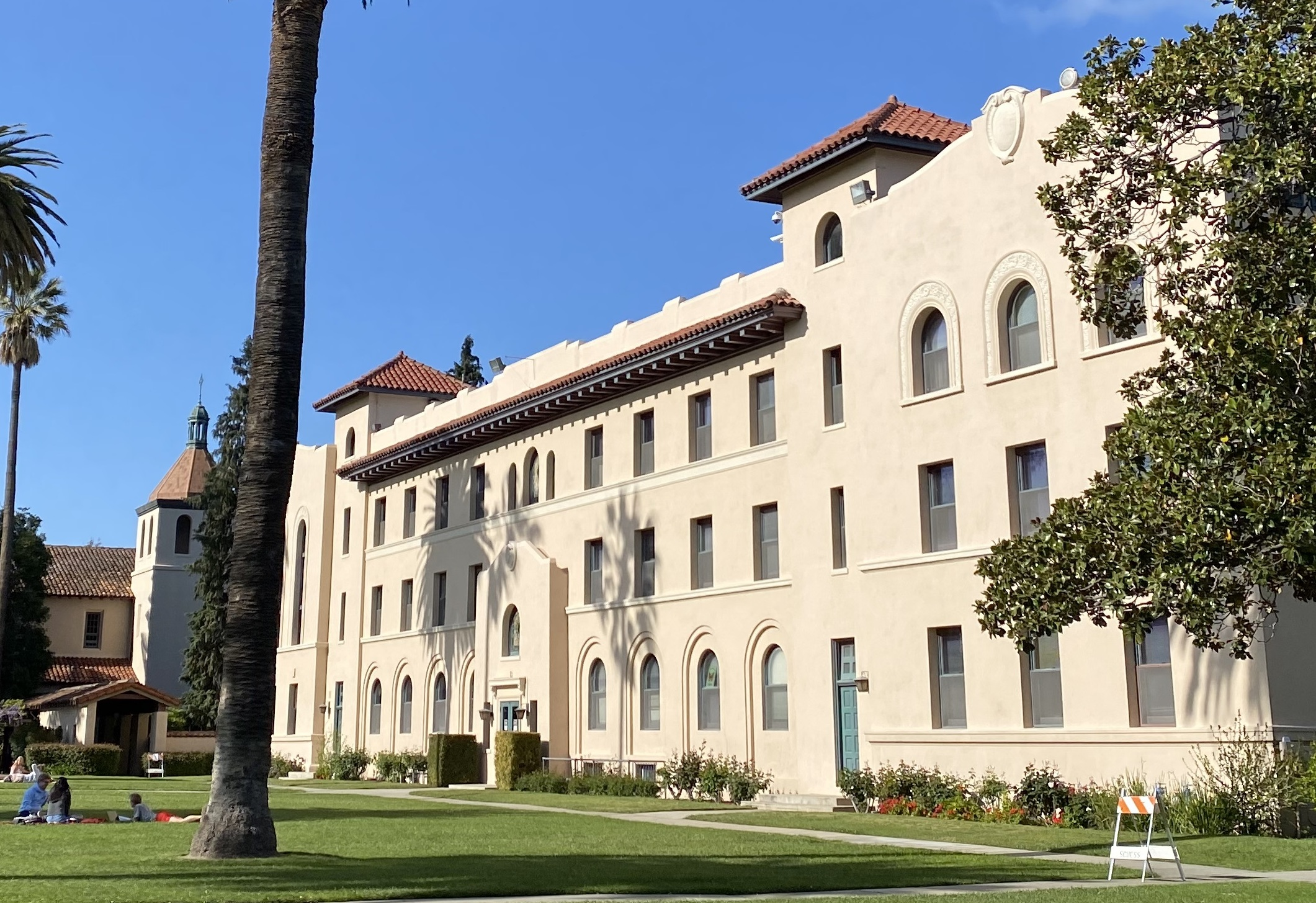
St. Joseph's Hall, built in a Mission Revival style in 1911

Santa Clara bears the distinction of awarding California's first bachelor's degree, bestowed upon Thomas I. Bergin in 1857, as well as its first graduate degree granted two years later.

The California Historical Society, the official state historical society of California, was founded in June 1871 on the campus of the College of Santa Clara by a group of prominent Californian politicians and professors, led by Californian Assemblyman John W. Dwinelle (an influential founder of the University of California).

=== Modern era ===
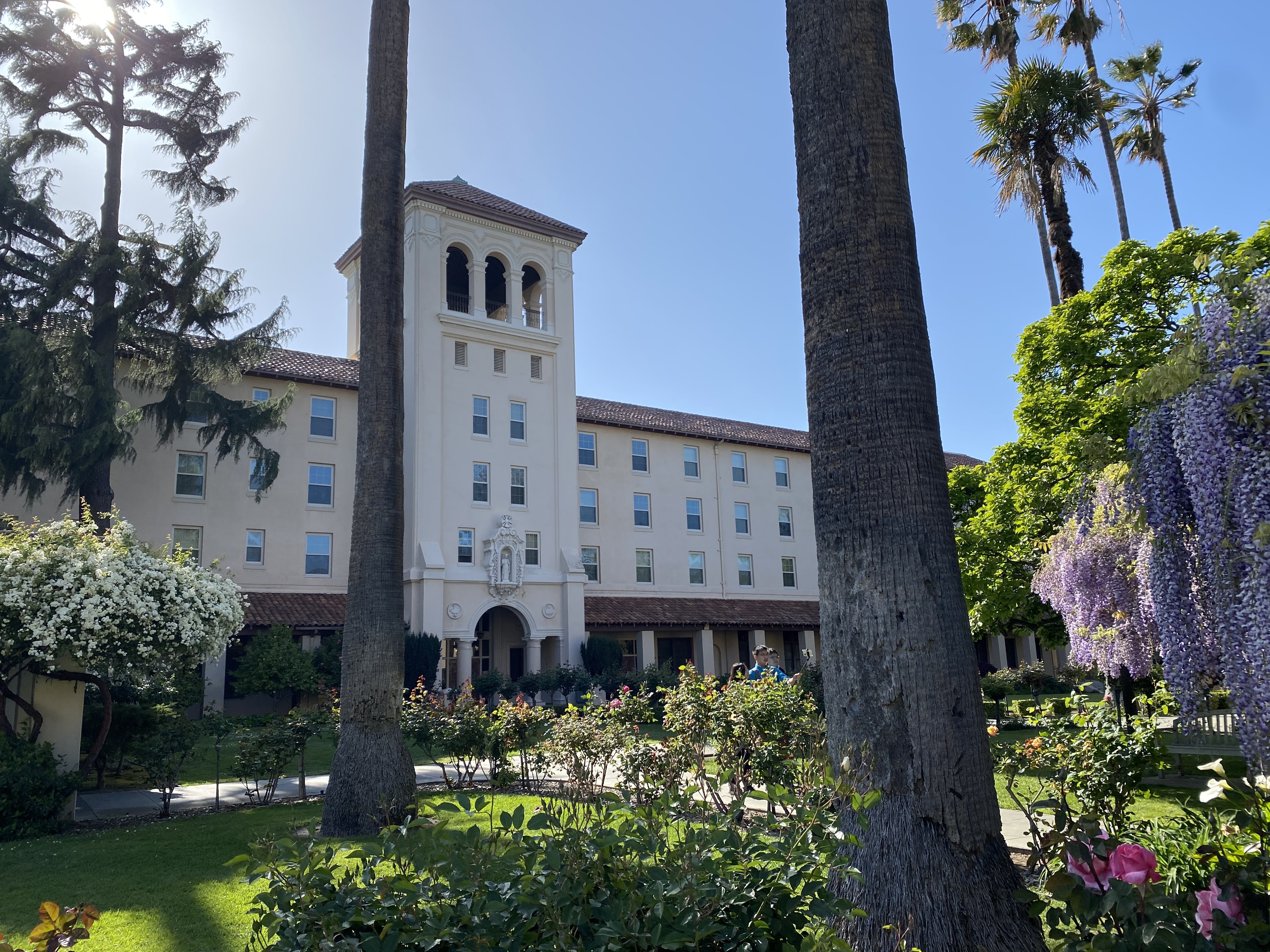
Nobili Hall, built in 1930 in a California Churrigueresque style

In 1912, the College of Santa Clara separated out its secondary-school component, Santa Clara Prep (now known as Bellarmine College Preparatory), and became the University of Santa Clara, with the addition of the School of Law and the School of Engineering.

In 1923, the Leavey School of Business was founded.

Women were first admitted in 1961 to what had been an all-men's university, making Santa Clara University the first Catholic university in California to admit both men and women.

In 1985, in part to avoid confusion with the University of Southern California (USC), the University of Santa Clara, as it had been known since 1912, changed its name to Santa Clara University. Diplomas were printed with the new name beginning in 1986.

In 2001 the School of Education and Counseling Psychology was formed to offer Master's level and other credential programs.

In 2012, Santa Clara University celebrated 50 years of having women attend Santa Clara University.

In May 2026, SCU's leaders announced that they would be launching a new medical school in partnership with Sutter Health, funded by a US$175 million donation by SCU alumnus and billionaire venture capitalist Mark Stevens and his wife, alumna and university board of trustees member Mary Stevens. It will be the first new medical school in the San Francisco Bay Area in over a century and is expected to enroll its first students in approximately 2029-2031.

== Campus ==
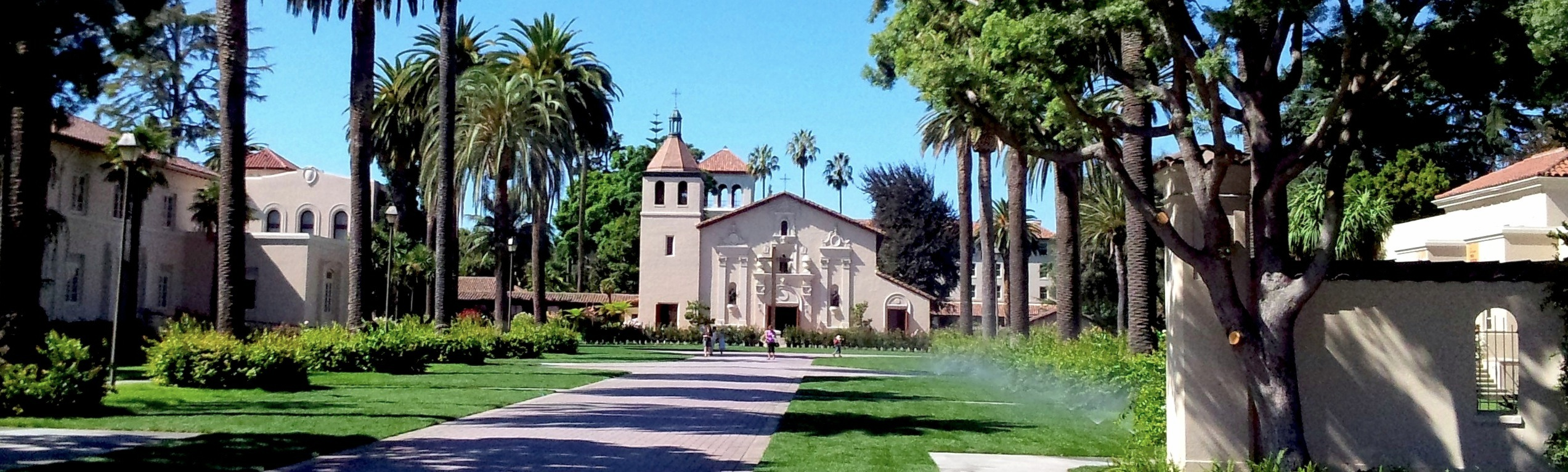
Mission Santa Clara de Asís is at the heart of SCU's historic campus.

The university address is in Santa Clara, California, though a significant part of the campus lies over the border into San Jose, California. Over the last century and a half, the Santa Clara University campus has expanded to more than 106 acres (43 ha).

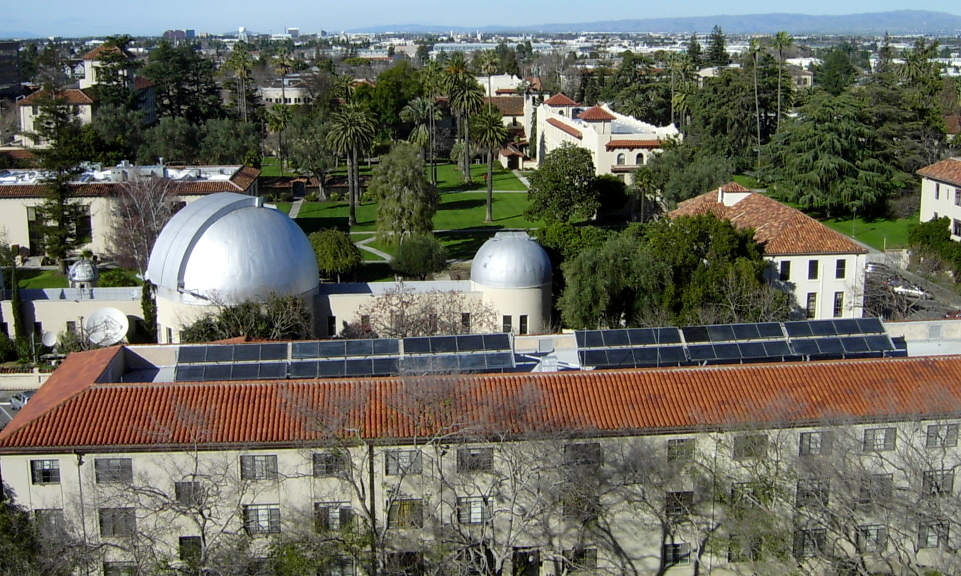
Aerial view of the Mission Gardens in the western part of campus

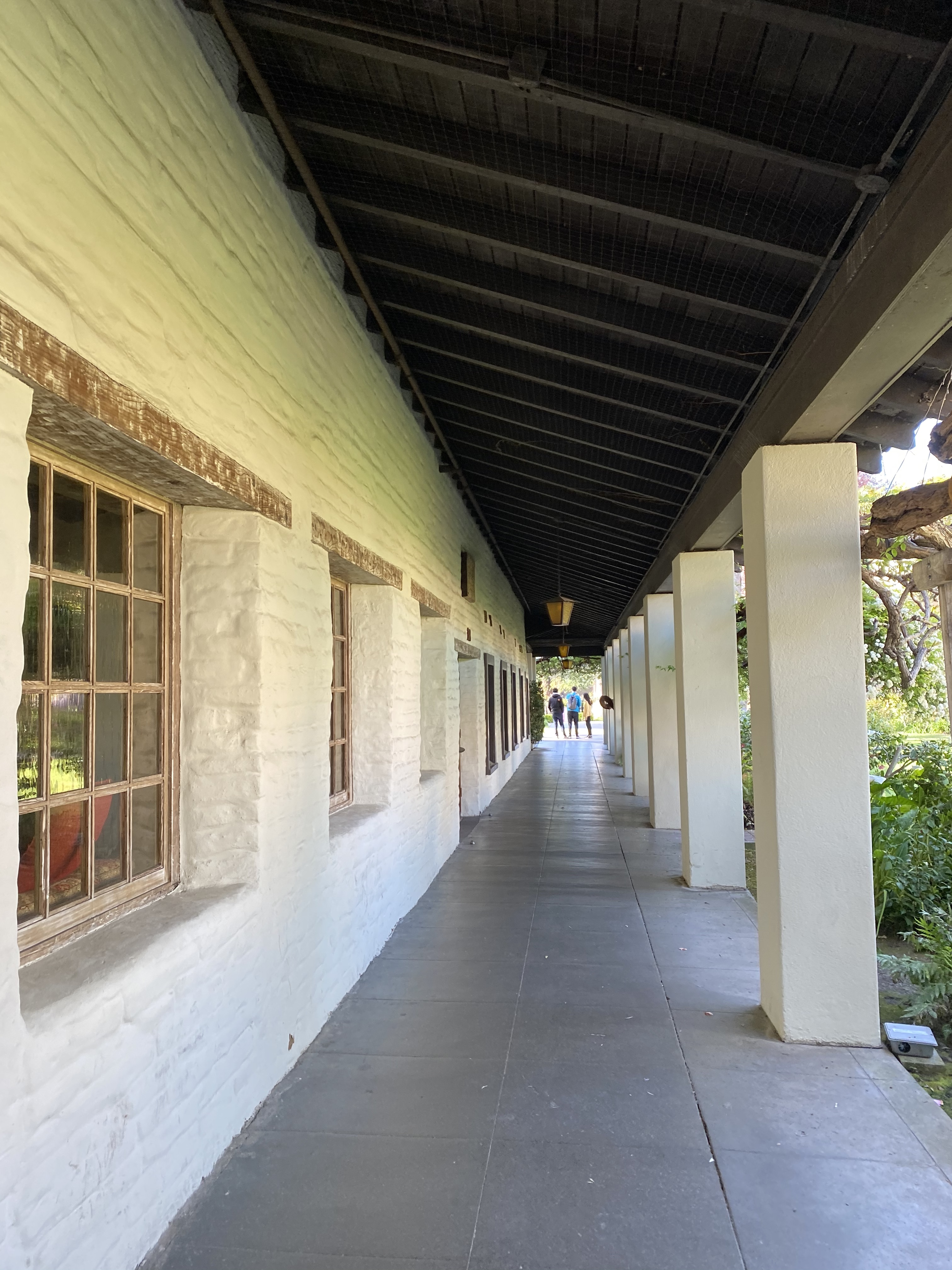
Built in 1822, Adobe Lodge is the oldest non-religious building on campus.

In the 1950s, after the university constructed Walsh Hall and the de Saisset Museum on two of the last remaining open spaces on the old college campus, Santa Clara began purchasing and annexing land from the surrounding community. The first addition, which occurred slightly earlier, brought space for football and baseball playing fields. Thereafter, particularly in the 1960s when women were admitted to the school, more land was acquired for residence halls and other new buildings and facilities.

In 1989 the Santa Clara University campus was unified when The Alameda (California State Route 82), a major thoroughfare that had bisected the university, was rerouted. Several interior roads were also closed and were replaced by sparsely landscaped pedestrian malls and plazas. The current five-year campus plan calls for integration of these areas with the gardens of the campus core.

The 1990s brought a number of campus additions, including the Music and Dance Building, a new science wing, the Arts and Sciences Building, the Malley Fitness Center, the Sobrato Residence Hall, and the first on-campus parking structure. Santa Clara carried out all deferred maintenance, including the renovation of Kenna Hall, the Adobe Lodge, and many other historic buildings. One unique feature of Santa Clara University's undergraduate education is the Residential Learning Community program. Eight Residential Learning Communities (RLCs), each with a distinct theme, integrate the classroom and resident life experience.

=== Recent development ===
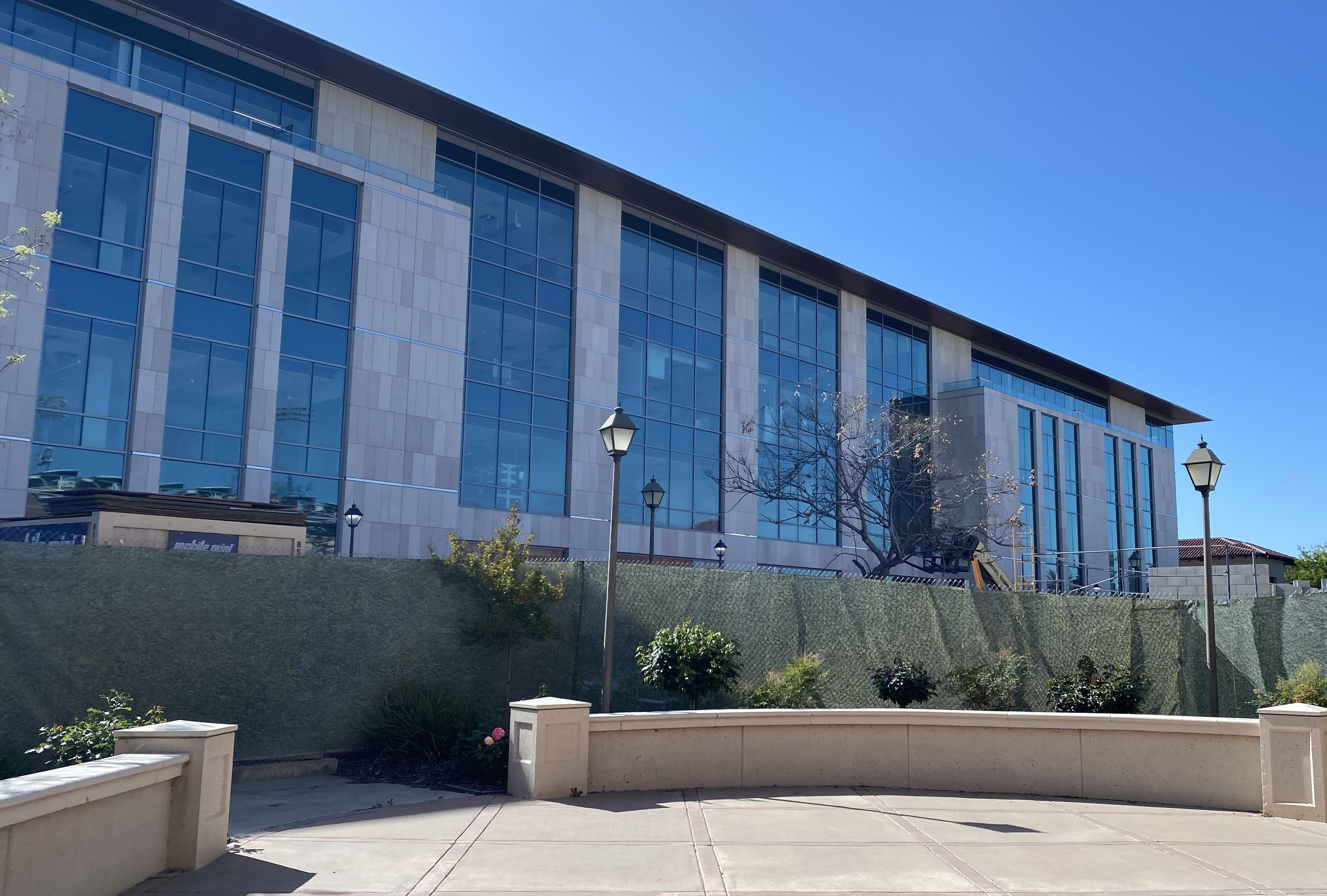
The Sobrato Campus for Discovery and Innovation

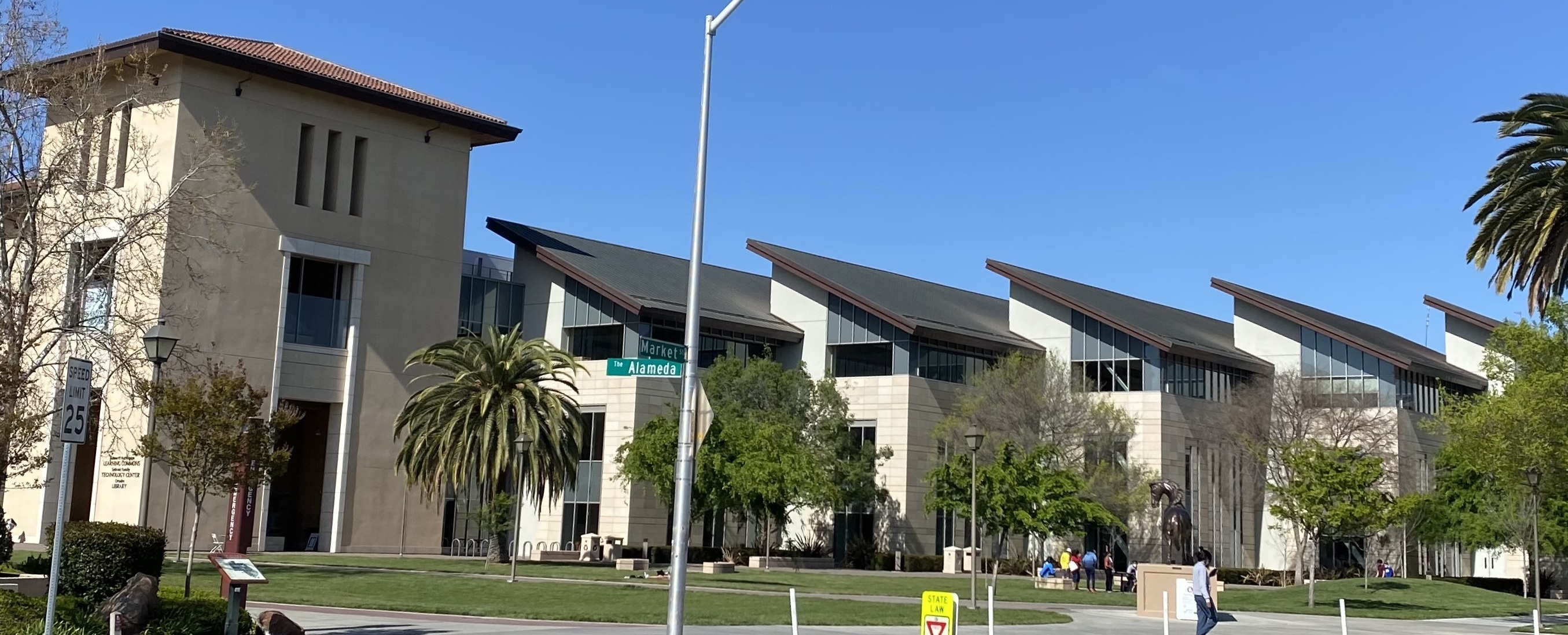
SCU Library & Learning Commons

Recently completed expansion projects include a new baseball field (Stephen Schott Stadium, 2005), a renovated basketball arena (Leavey Center, 2000), Kennedy Mall – the campus' first "green building" (2005), a Jesuit community residence (2006), a 194,000-square-foot (18,000 m^{2}; 1.80 ha) library (2008), a new 85,000-square-foot (7,900 m^{2}; 0.79 ha) building for the Leavey School of Business (2008), a new residence hall, Graham (2012), a new Admission and Enrollment Services building (2012), and a new Art and Art History Building (2016). The new Charney Hall (2018) replaces and consolidates Bannan Hall and the Heafey Law Library into the new Law School.

The university's main entrance, Palm Drive, was closed to automobiles in 2013 to create a new gateway to Santa Clara's campus. The new pedestrian mall was designed to "highlight the Mission Church as the centerpiece of the campus." In 2014, Alviso Street between Franklin and Market was also closed to cars and remodeled.

In 2022, Santa Clara University completed construction of the $300 million dollar, 270,000 square foot Sobrato Campus for Discovery and Innovation. Spanning three buildings, SCDI is one of the largest STEM educational facilities in the country. It is home to 13 academic departments from the School of Engineering and the College of Arts & Sciences, the Innovation Zone, Robotics Systems Lab, Latimer Energy Lab, and Imaginarium virtual reality lab. It also features natural science and flex labs, collaboration hubs, and multidisciplinary project spaces.

In 2025, the university began to relocate the Jesuit School of Theology of Santa Clara University from its current location in Berkeley to the main campus in Santa Clara.

=== Points of interest ===
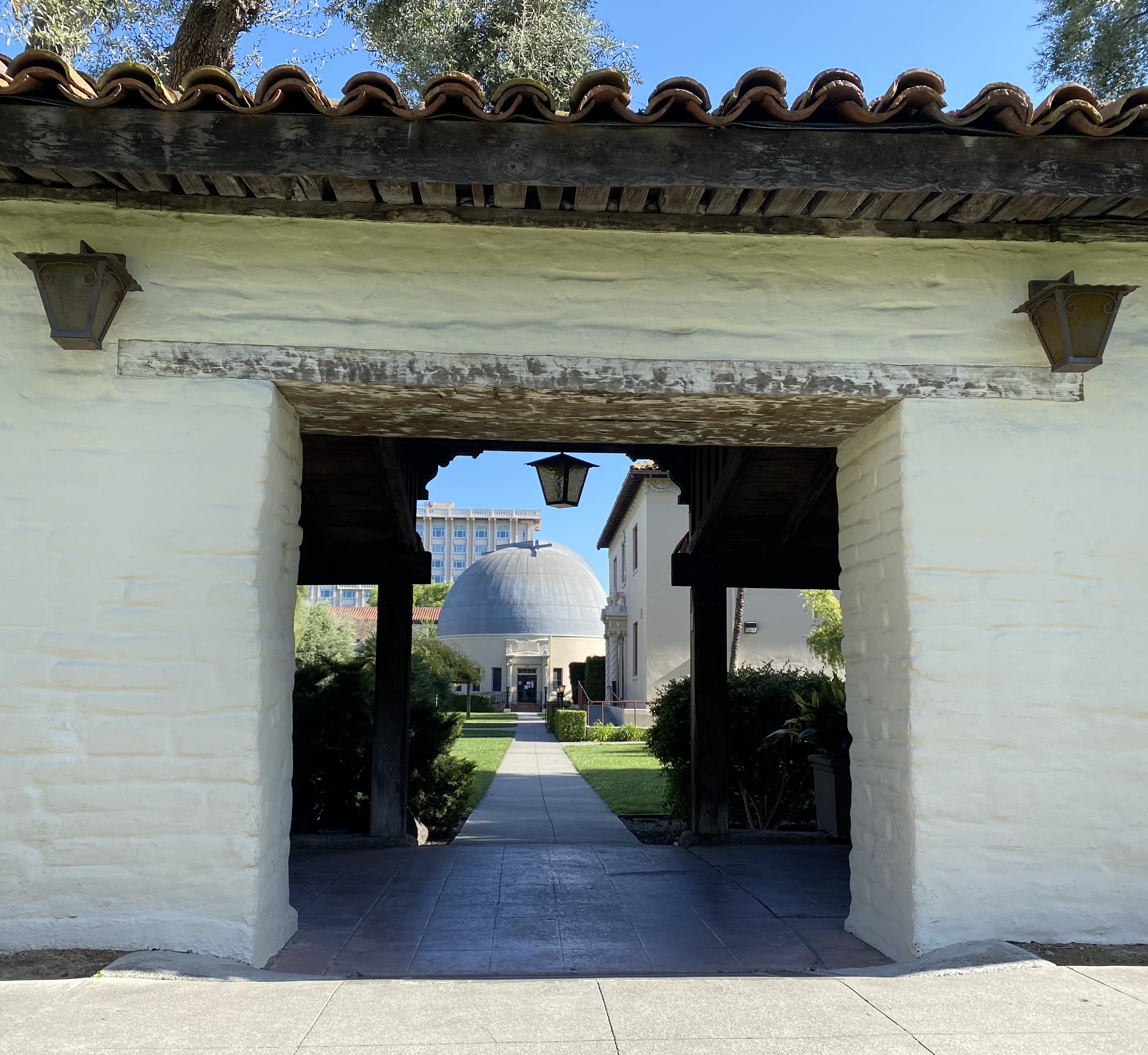
View through one of the old Spanish adobe covered walkways

- Mission Santa Clara de Asís: University Chapel and historical mission dating back to 1777. The current location is the third site; it was built in 1828, destroyed by fire in 1925, and rebuilt in 1929.
- Bellomy Field: Bellomy is used for intramural sports and for casual student use.
- Malley Fitness Center: Santa Clara University's center for recreational sports, indoor intramurals, weightlifting, and fitness classes. Malley Fitness Center has three full basketball/volleyball courts, a large weight room, two locker rooms, a 2,100-square-foot (200 square meter) multipurpose room, lounge space, and new offices for recreation and wellness programs.
- Saint Clare School: The mission's first elementary school (K-8). Founded by the Sisters of Notre Dame de Namur in 1856. Located behind Nobili Hall at Lafayette and Lexington Street.
- Saint Clare Parish and St. Clare Parish Hall: In 1926 St Clare's Parish was built one block behind the Mission Santa Clara to take over the parish functions of the Mission church after it suffered a fire in 1925.

=== Sustainability ===
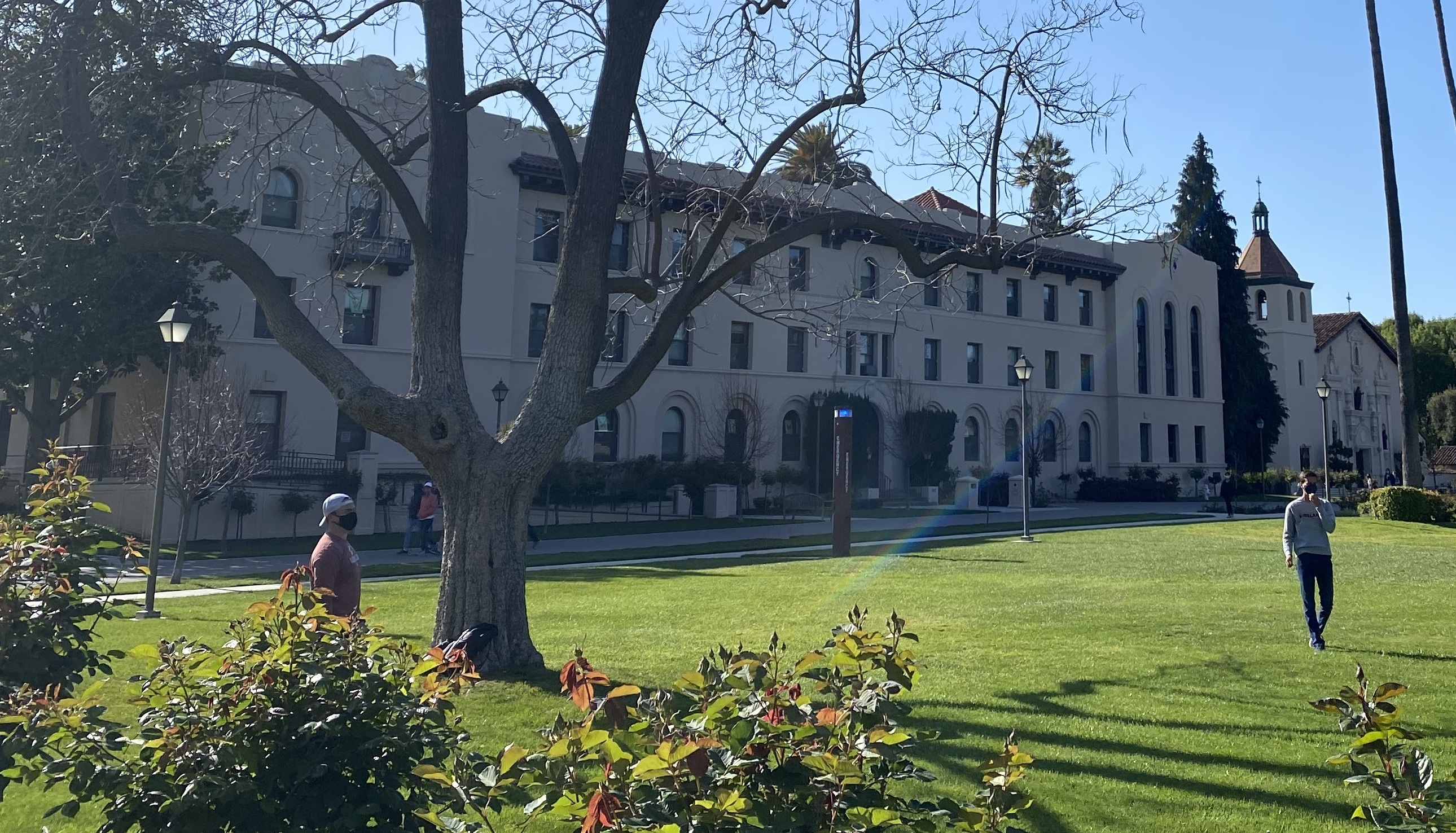
The Alviso Mall

In 2014, Santa Clara University received the STARS Gold Rating by Association for the Advancement of Sustainability in Higher Education (AASHE). In 2015, Santa Clara University ranked No.19 on the Princeton Review's new "Top 50 Green Colleges" list and is also featured in The Princeton Review Guide to 353 Green Colleges as one of the most environmentally responsible colleges.

In 2013, the Center for Sustainability was established to advance academic and public understanding of the ways in which social justice and sustainability intersect by integrating principles of social, environmental, and economic sustainability into campus operations, academic and student life, and outreach programs.

Santa Clara University is a member of The Green Building Council, the overseeing body of the LEED rating system. In the fall of 2011, Paul Locatelli, S. J. Student Activities Center was certified LEED Gold. In addition, Schott Admission and Enrollment Services, Donohoe Alumni House, and Graham Residence Hall have all been designed to LEED gold standards and are pending certification. All new buildings are designed with the Sustainable Building Policy, adopted in May 2014.

== Administration ==
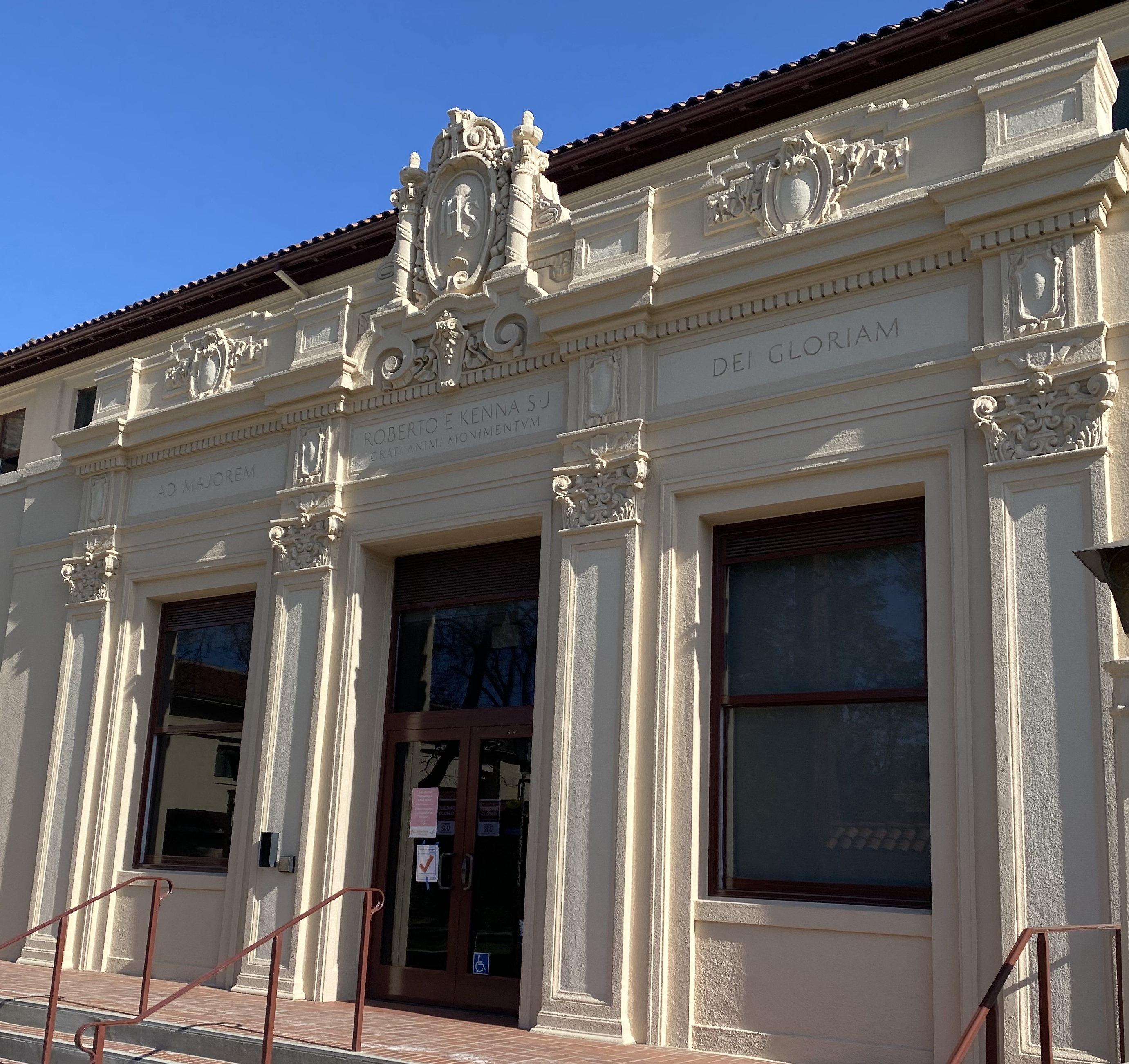
Kenna Hall, built in a Spanish Colonial Revival style in 1924

Santa Clara University is a private corporation owned and governed by a privately appointed board of trustees composed of 44 members. Built around historic Mission Santa Clara, the present university is home to a population of approximately 5,435 undergraduate and 3,335 master's, Juris Doctor, and PhD students. The institution employs 522 full-time faculty members, who are divided between four professional schools and the College of Arts and Sciences, all of which are located on the 106-acre (43 ha) mission campus. In July 2009 the Jesuit School of Theology at Berkeley (JST), formerly an independent institution, legally merged with the university, taking the name "Jesuit School of Theology of Santa Clara University." Although a division of SCU, it retains its campus in Berkeley, California. JST is one of two Jesuit seminaries in the United States with ecclesiastical faculties approved by the Vatican's Congregation for Catholic Education. The other, Weston Jesuit School of Theology, completed a similar affiliation with Boston College in June 2008, becoming Boston College School of Theology and Ministry.

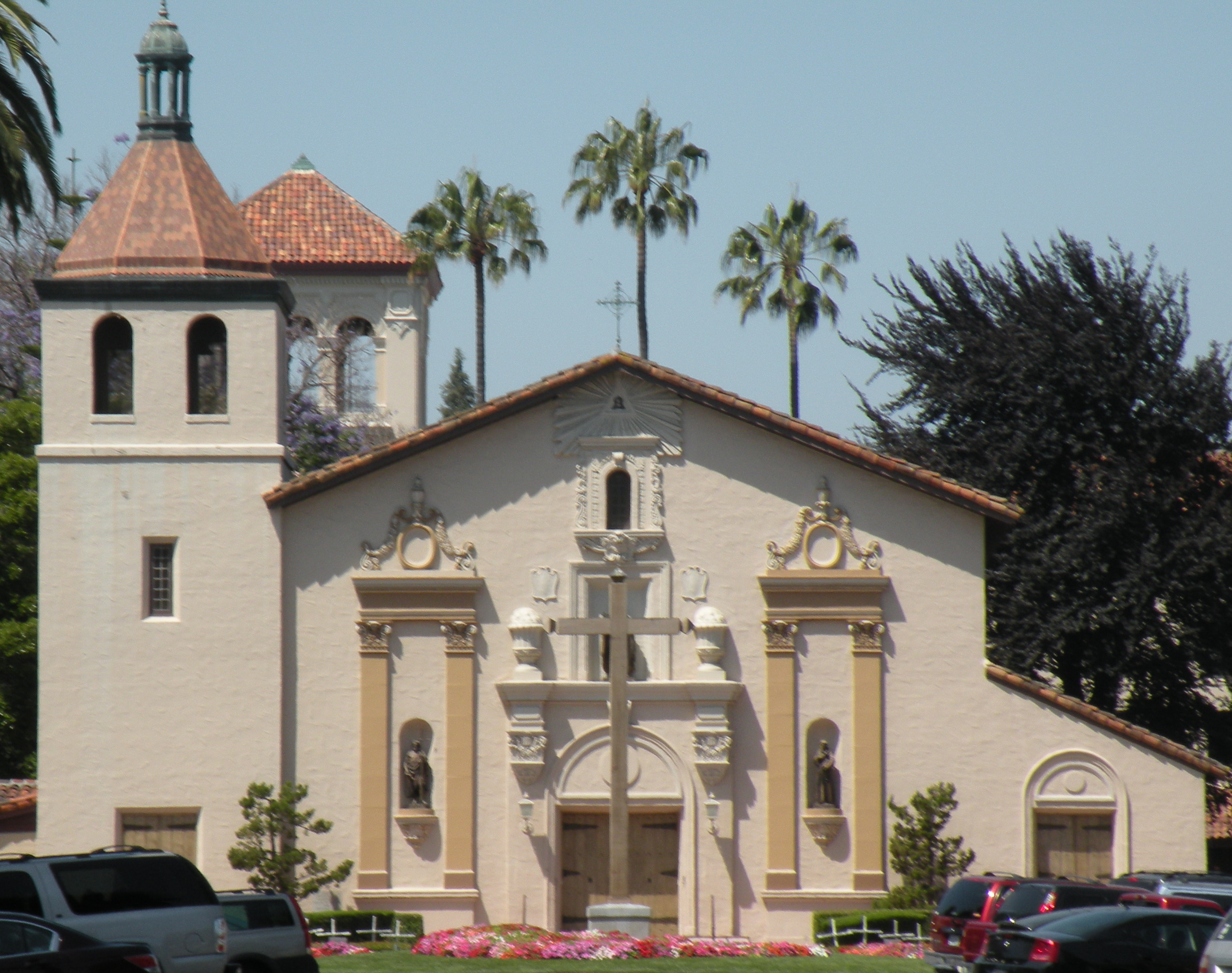
Mission Santa Clara de Asís

Santa Clara University is civilly chartered and governed by a board of trustees, which appoints the president. By internal statute, the president must be a member of the Jesuit order, although the members of the board are primarily non-Jesuits. About 42 Jesuit priests and brothers are active teachers and administrators in various departments and centers located on the main campus in Santa Clara. An additional 15 Jesuits currently hold faculty positions at the university's Jesuit School of Theology in Berkeley. Jesuits comprise around 7% of the permanent faculty and hold teaching positions in biology, computer engineering, counseling psychology, economics, English, history, law, philosophy, physics, political science, psychology, religious studies, and theater arts in addition to theology. They also serve in campus and residence-hall ministry, and some act as faculty directors in residential learning communities (RLC's).

On March 18, 2021, Santa Clara University Board of Trustees Chairman John M. Sobrato announced Kevin F. O'Brien had been placed on leave pending an inquiry into "exhibited behaviors in adult settings, consisting primarily of conversations, which may be inconsistent with established Jesuit protocols and boundaries". On May 12, 2021, John M. Sobrato announced to students and faculty that Kevin F. O'Brien resigned May 9, 2021 at the conclusion of this inquiry, coinciding with his enrollment in a therapeutic outpatient program to address "related personal issues, including alcohol and stress counseling". As of June 30, 2021, Santa Clara University's endowment was $1.54 billion.

Julie H. Sullivan, Ph.D., the first layperson and first woman to serve as president, began her term on July 1, 2022. She was formerly the president of the University of St. Thomas in Minnesota.

In 2024, Santa Clara announced the Santa Clara University California Promise and the Santa Clara University Cristo Rey Promise, committing the university to meeting the full demonstrated financial need of admitted first-year students who qualify for Cal Grants and graduates from national Cristo Rey Network high schools.

== Colleges and schools ==
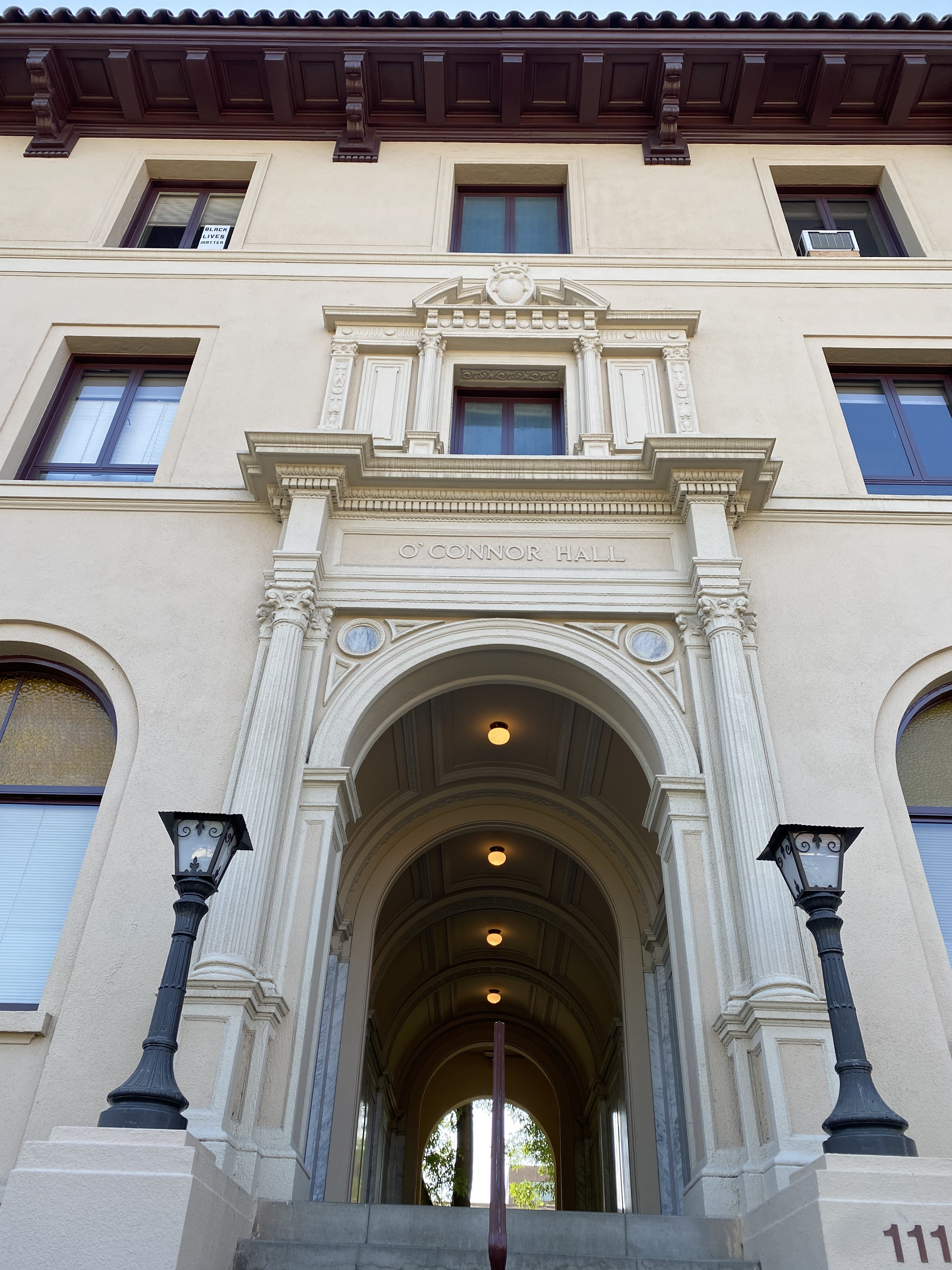
O'Connor Hall on the Alviso Mall

Santa Clara University is organized into six professional schools, the School of Arts and Sciences, School of Education and Counseling Psychology, SCU Leavey School of Business, School of Engineering, Jesuit School of Theology, and the School of Law. The university's professional schools are all led by an academic dean.

=== College of Arts and Sciences ===
The College of Arts and Sciences offers Bachelor of Science and Bachelor of Arts degrees.

=== Leavey School of Business ===
The Leavey School of Business was founded in 1923 and accredited by the Association to Advance Collegiate Schools of Business thirty years later. Students can earn a Bachelor of Science in Commerce, Master of Business Administration, Executive Master of Business Administration, and Master of Science in Information Systems (MSIS).

Drew Starbird has been dean of the school since 2010. He was replaced by Caryn Beck-Dudley starting in the 2015–16 school year.

=== Education, Counseling Psychology, and Pastoral Ministries ===
The School of Education, Counseling Psychology, and Pastoral Ministries was created in fall 2001, bringing together graduate programs in Counseling Psychology, Education, and Pastoral Ministries. Approximately 800 graduate students are enrolled in the school, with 200 studying psychology, 400 studying education, and the remainder studying pastoral ministries.

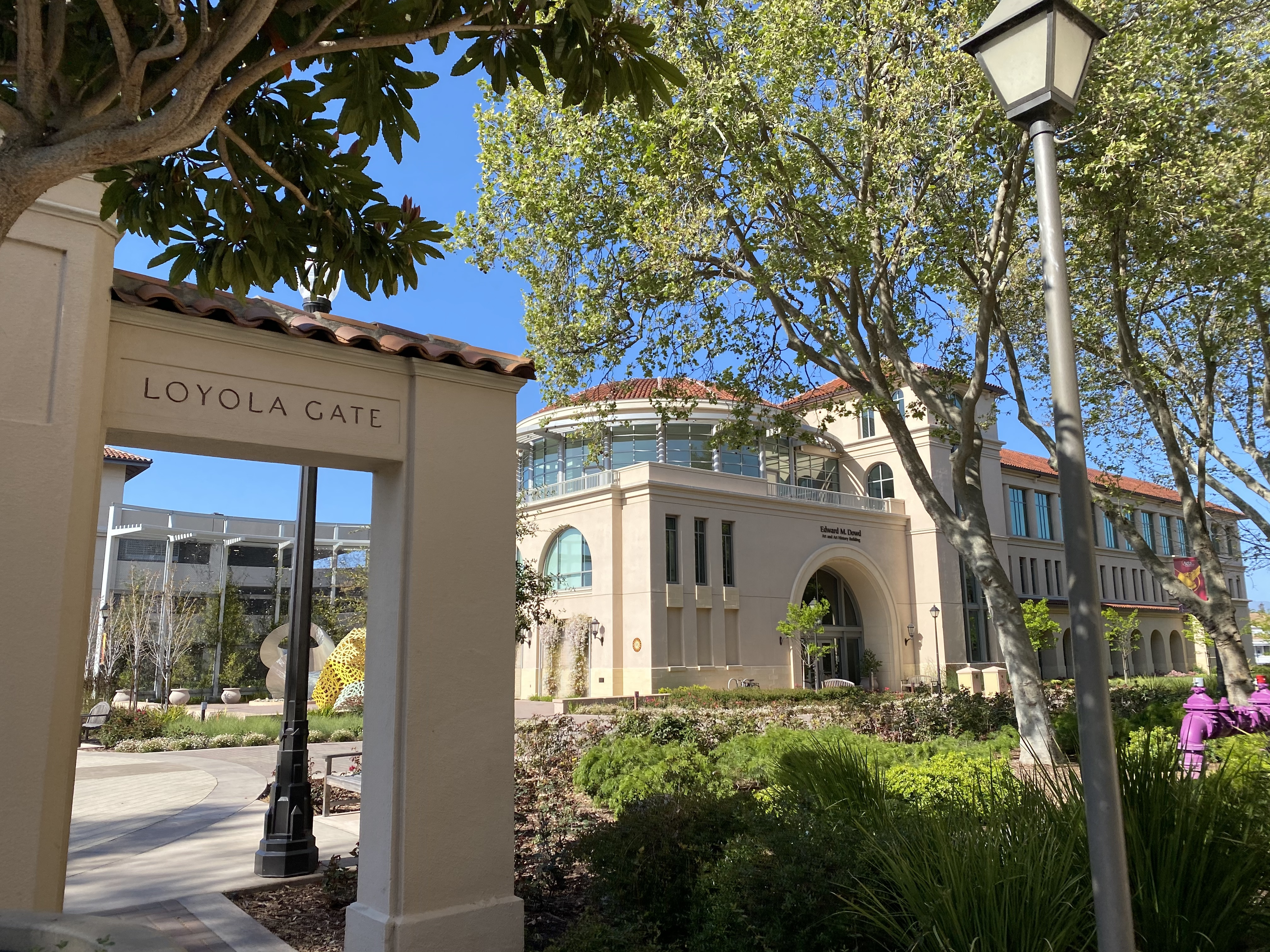
Dowd Arts Building & Loyola Gate

=== School of Engineering ===
The School of Engineering was founded and began offering bachelor's degrees in 1912. Over the next century, the school added Master's and doctoral programs designed to meet Silicon Valley's growing need for expert engineers. Today, the Valley provides opportunities for the school's students and faculty, particularly those in electrical engineering and information technology, to work closely with high-tech companies and government institutions. This ranges from individual internships to larger partnerships with projects such as O/OREOS.

=== Jesuit School of Theology ===
The Jesuit School of Theology is a Divinity School of Santa Clara University located in Berkeley, California, and one of the member colleges of the Graduate Theological Union. The school was founded in 1934 and merged with Santa Clara University in 2009. Prior to its merger with Santa Clara University, it was known as the Jesuit School of Theology at Berkeley.

=== School of Law ===
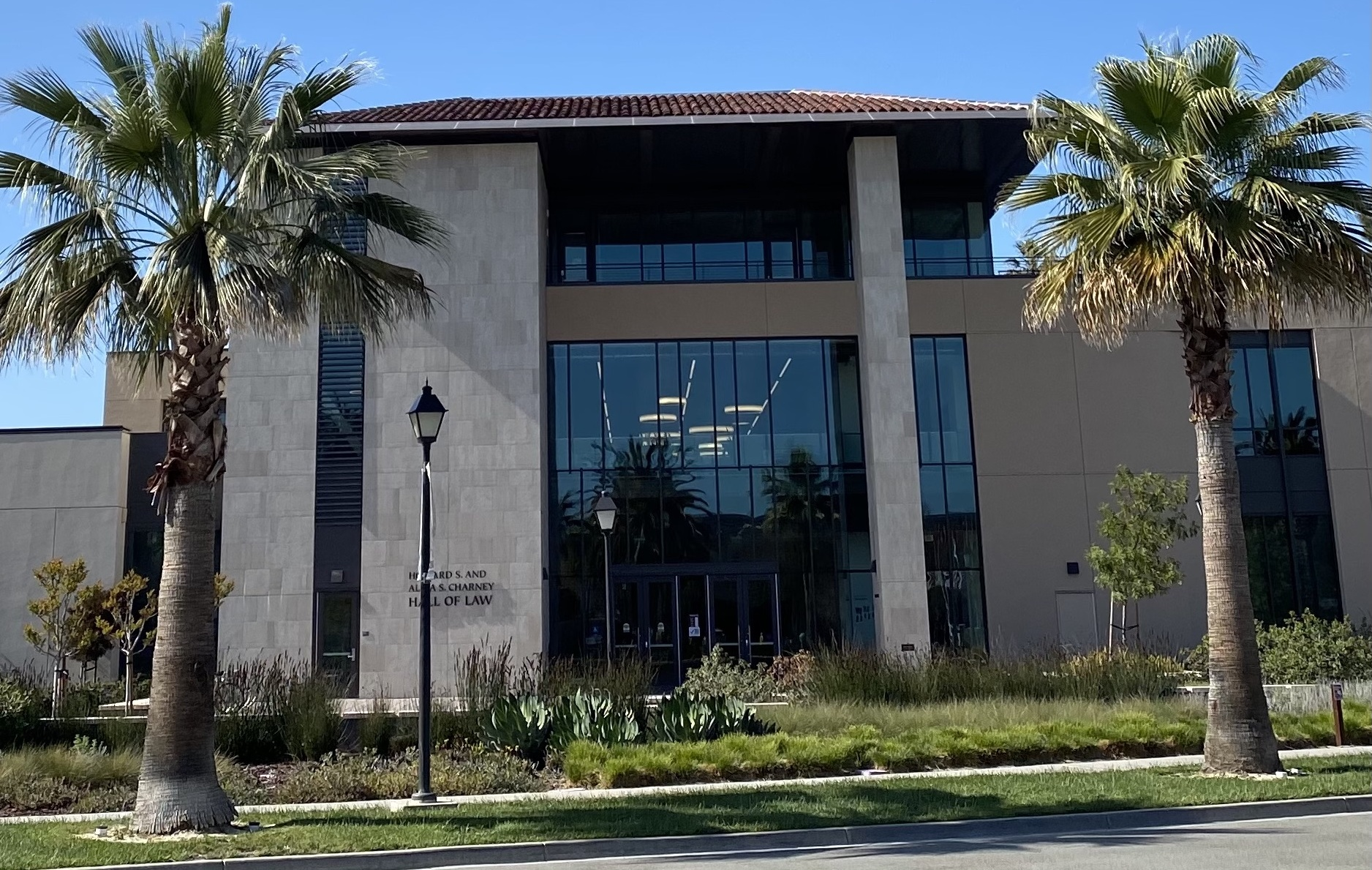
Charney Hall of the Santa Clara University School of Law

The School of Law was founded in 1911. The school offers the Juris Doctor degree. It also offers several double degree programs, including JD/Master of Business Administration and JD/Master of Science in Information Systems offered in conjunction with Santa Clara University's Leavey School of Business.

The school offers Master of Laws degrees in Intellectual Property. Santa Clara Law features specialized curricular programs in High Tech and Intellectual Property law, International law, and Public Interest and Social Justice law.

== Academics and rankings ==
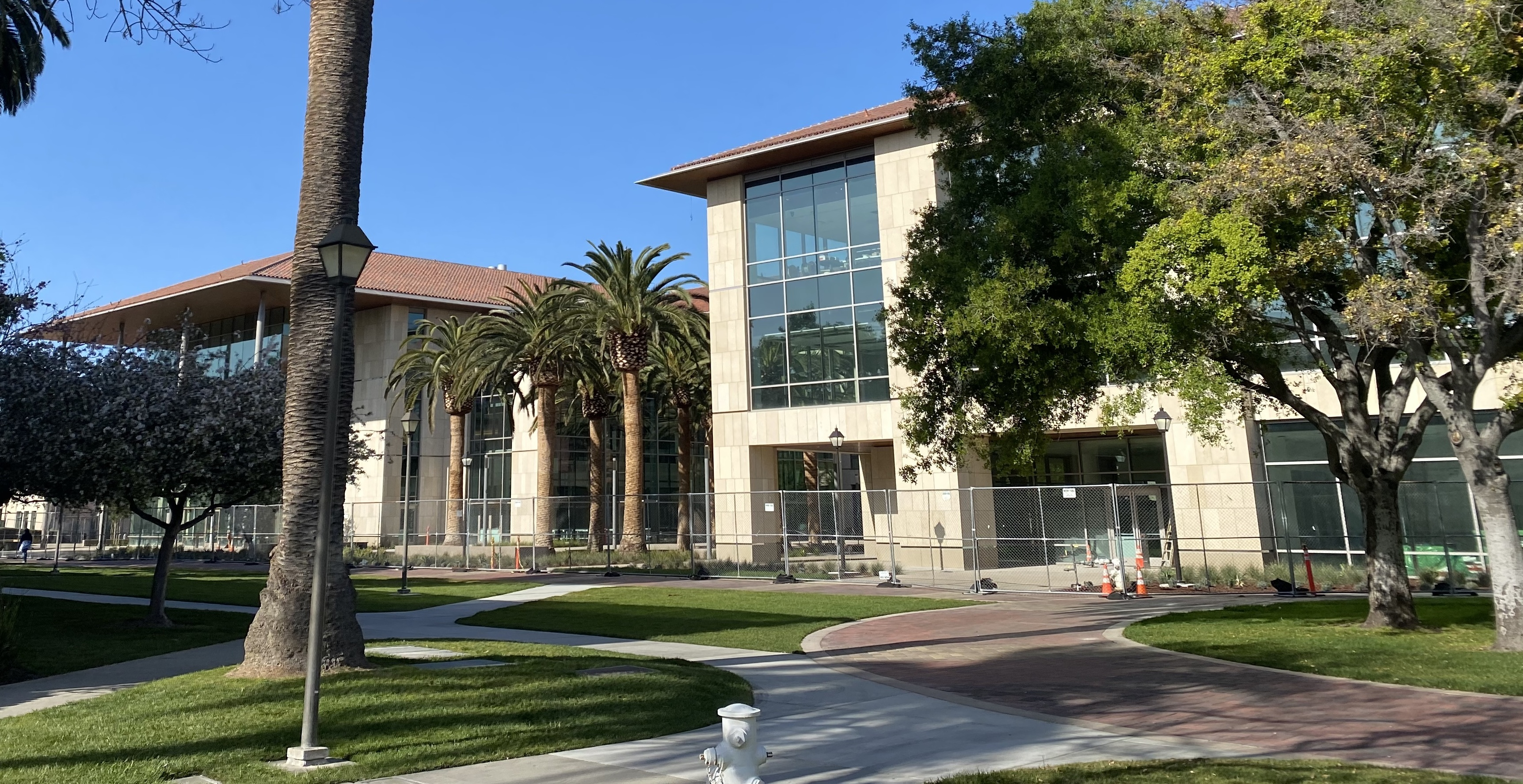
The Sobrato Campus for Discovery and Innovation

Undergraduate demographics as of fall 2022
Race and ethnicity	Total
White	40%
Asian	21%
Hispanic	19%
Other (Note: Other consists of multiracial Americans & those who prefer to not say.)	11%
Foreign national	6%
Black	3%
Economic diversity
Low-income (Note: The percentage of students who received an income-based federal Pell grant intended for low-income students.)	11%
Affluent (Note: The percentage of students who are a part of the American middle class at the bare minimum.)	89%

As of 2024, Santa Clara has an enrollment of 6,484 undergraduate students and 3,151 graduate students (total of 9,728 students). The undergraduate gender ratio is approximately 50:50.

Santa Clara offers undergraduates the opportunity to pursue 45 majors in its three undergraduate schools and colleges: the College of Arts and Science, the School of Engineering, and the Leavey School of Business. Santa Clara University also has six graduate and professional schools, including the School of Law, School of Engineering, the Leavey School of Business, the School of Education and Counseling Psychology, and the Jesuit School of Theology (campus located in Berkeley, California).

The student to faculty ratio is 11:1 with 99.5% of all classes being fewer than 50 students.

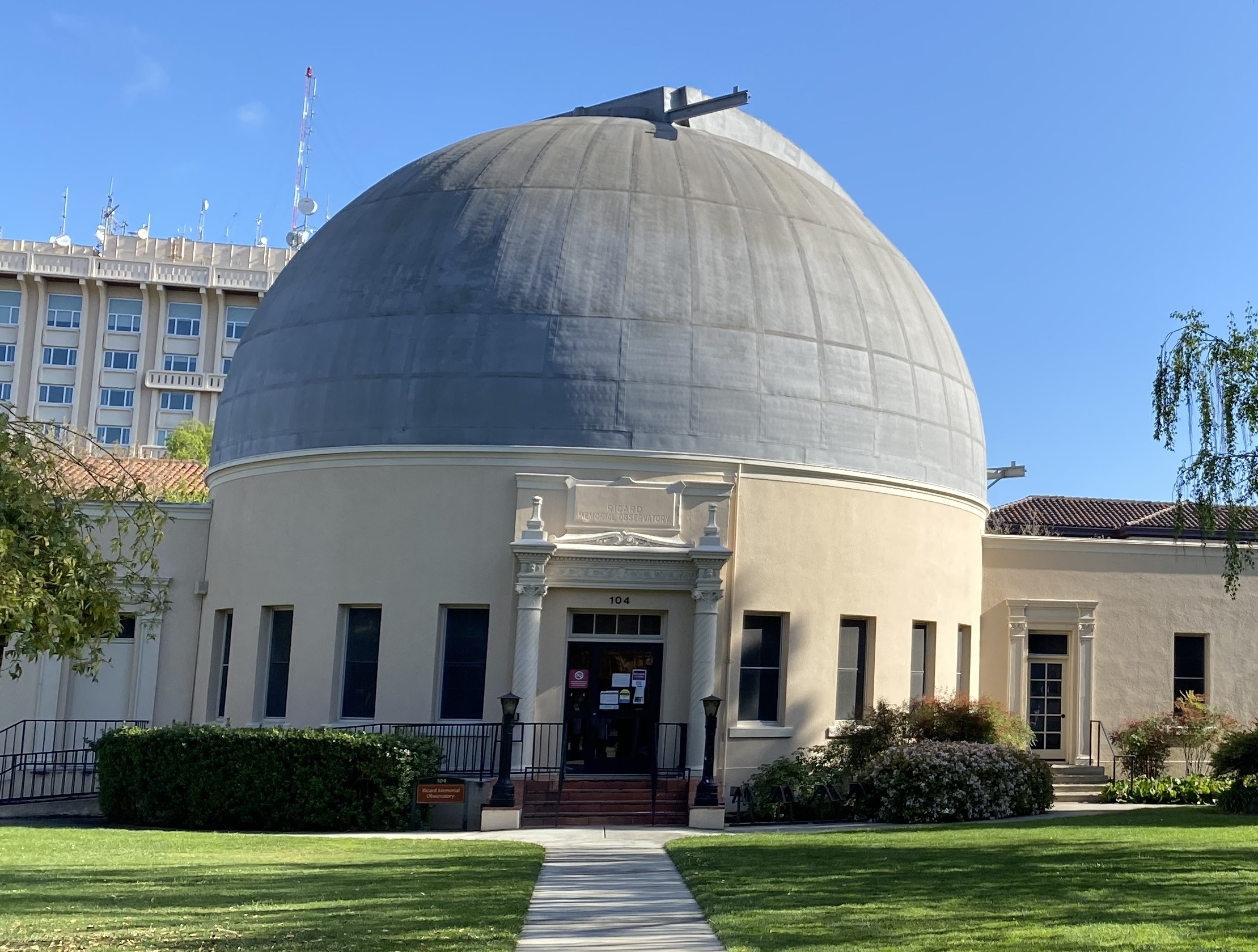
Ricard Observatory

U.S. News & World Report categorizes Santa Clara University as 'more selective'. For the Class of 2027 (enrolled Fall 2023), Santa Clara received 18,839 applications, accepting 42% of applicants. As of 2025, SCU receives over 20,000 applications for its incoming class. SCU's freshman retention rate is 95%, with 86% going on to graduate within six years.

The enrolled first-year class of 2023 had the following standardized test scores: the middle 50% range (25th percentile-75th percentile) of SAT scores was 630–700 for SAT Evidence-Based Reading and Writing and 650–740 for SAT Math, while the middle 50% range of ACT scores was 28–32. The middle 50% high school grade point average (GPA) was 3.56–3.87 (unweighted 4-point scale).

For SCU's 2024–2025 school year, undergraduate tuition and fees were $62,760, room and board cost $19,446, a university enhancement fee cost $753, and total indirect costs (including books, transportation, and personal expenses) estimated at $5,691, totaling $88,650.

SCU maintains its Catholic and Jesuit affiliation and supports numerous initiatives intended to further its religious mission. Students are encouraged, but not required, to attend the Sunday evening student Masses in the mission church and are also encouraged to participate in campus ministry programs and lectures. All bachelor's degrees require three religious studies courses as part of the academic core. An emphasis on social justice is furthered through the Pedro Arrupe Partnership and Kolvenbach Solidarity programs, which offer service opportunities in the community and immersion opportunities throughout the world.

=== Rankings ===
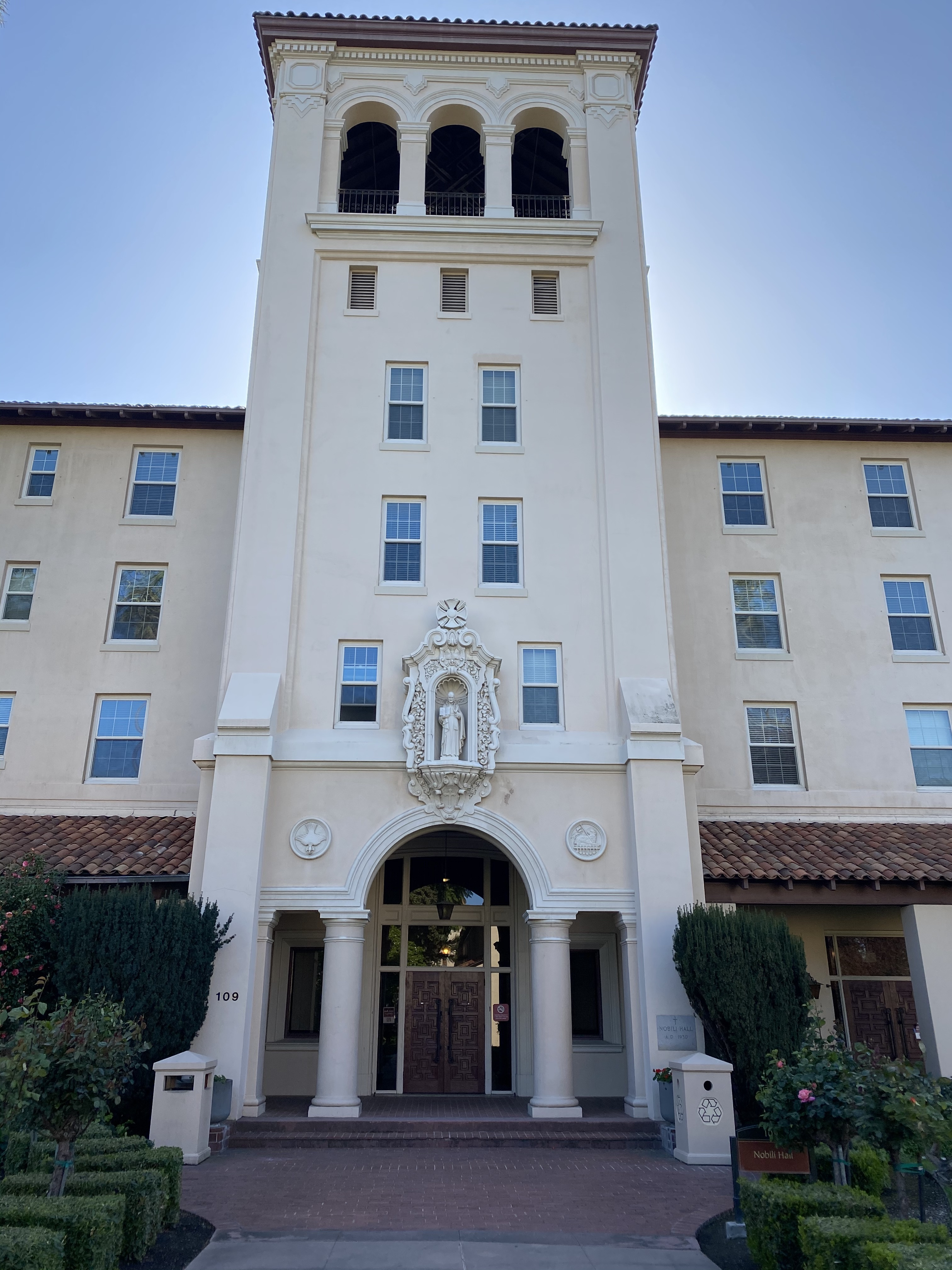
The Nobili Hall tower

Academic rankings

National
- Forbes: 61
- U.S. News & World Report: 59
- Washington Monthly: 132
- WSJ/College Pulse: 38

In 2024, the Wall Street Journal/College Pulse ranked SCU 38th on the list of "2025 Best Colleges in the US."

In U.S. News & World Report's 2026 ranking of national universities, Santa Clara University tied for 59th overall and tied for 17th for best undergraduate teaching. US News also listed SCU as one of its 22 "Colleges with the Best Return on Investment."

Forbes ranked Santa Clara University 61st out of the top 500 rated private and public colleges and universities in America for the 2024–25 report. Santa Clara was also ranked 43rd among private colleges and 15th in the West. In 2008, the first year of the list, Santa Clara was ranked No. 318 out of 569.

In 2025, Santa Clara was ranked 7th in "Best Universities For a Bachelor's Degree" by PayScale, up from 9th in 2023. Santa Clara was ranked 2nd for Engineering majors, 3rd for Communications majors, and 6th for Business majors. It also ranked highly for Humanities, Social Science, Computer Science, and Art majors.

Kiplinger's Personal Finance ranked SCU 39th on the 2019 Best Values in Private Universities list, 123rd overall, and fifth in California.

On College Factual's list of Best Catholic Colleges, SCU ranked 5th. On its list of Best Colleges nationwide, SCU ranked 50th.

In 2017, Money Magazine ranked the Leavey School of Business tenth in the nation.

Graduate programs within Leavey School of Business, School of Engineering, School of Law rank nationally on U.S. News & World Report. As of 2025, SCU's Part-time MBA Program ranked 19th, Business Analytics MBA Program ranked 5th, and the Finance MBA Program ranked 6th. SCU's Intellectual Property Law program ranked 4th.

Santa Clara University was named to the 2009, 2010, 2011, 2012, 2013 and 2014 President's Higher Education Community Service Honor Roll for community service programs and student involvement.

In 2012, Newsweek ranked Santa Clara University as the second most beautiful college in America.

=== Centers and institutes ===
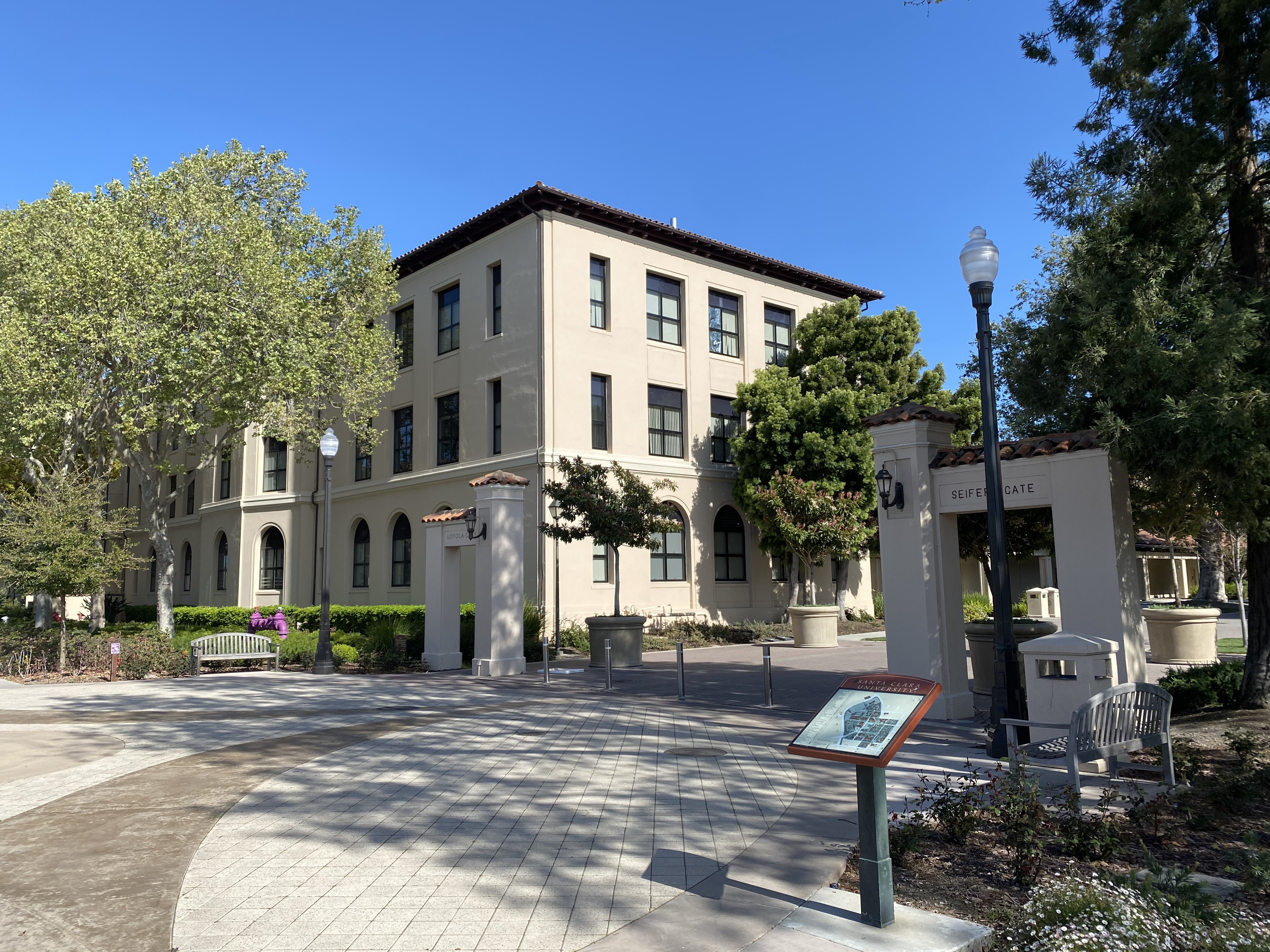
The Loyola & Seifert Gates

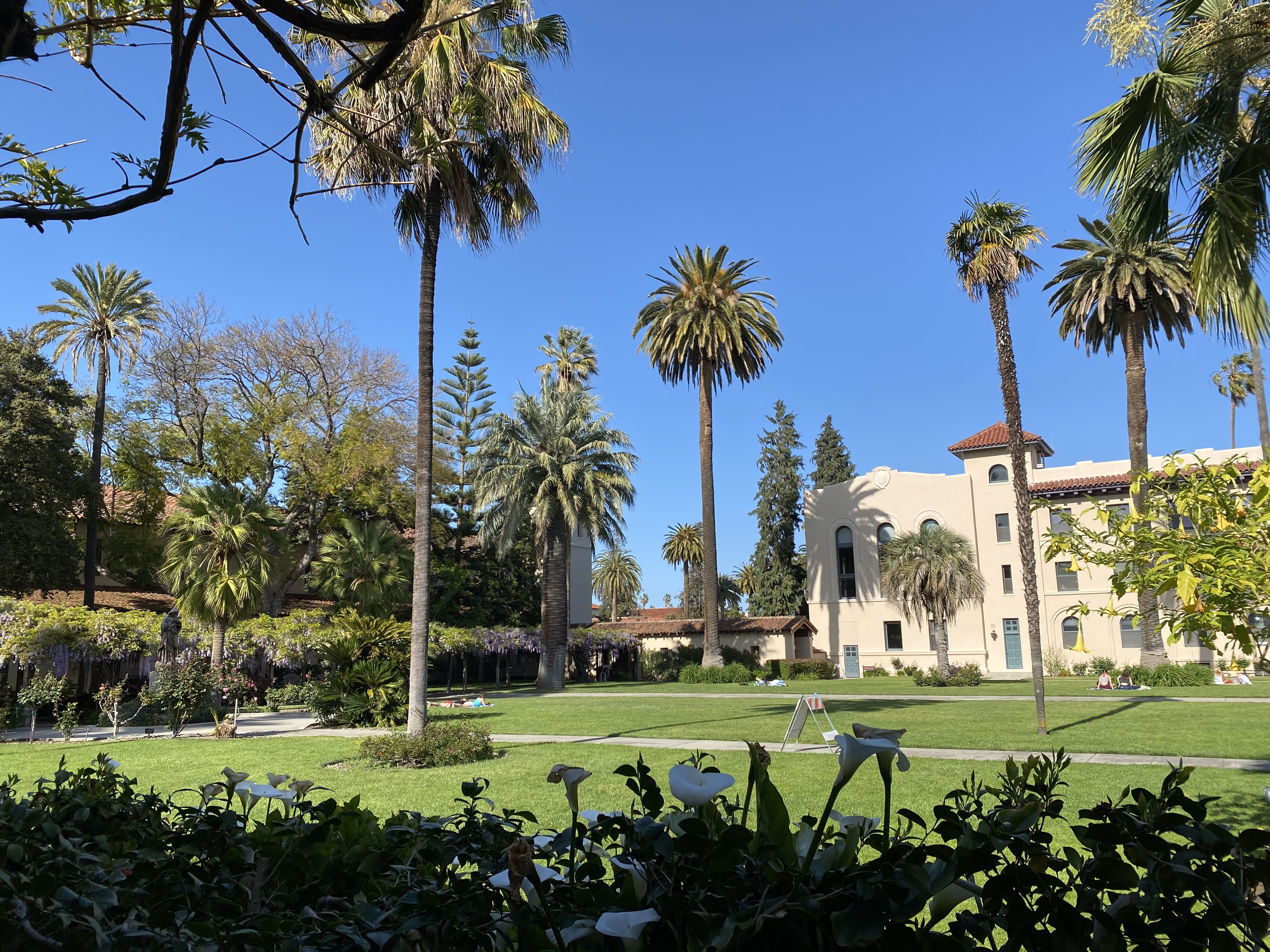
The Mission Gardens

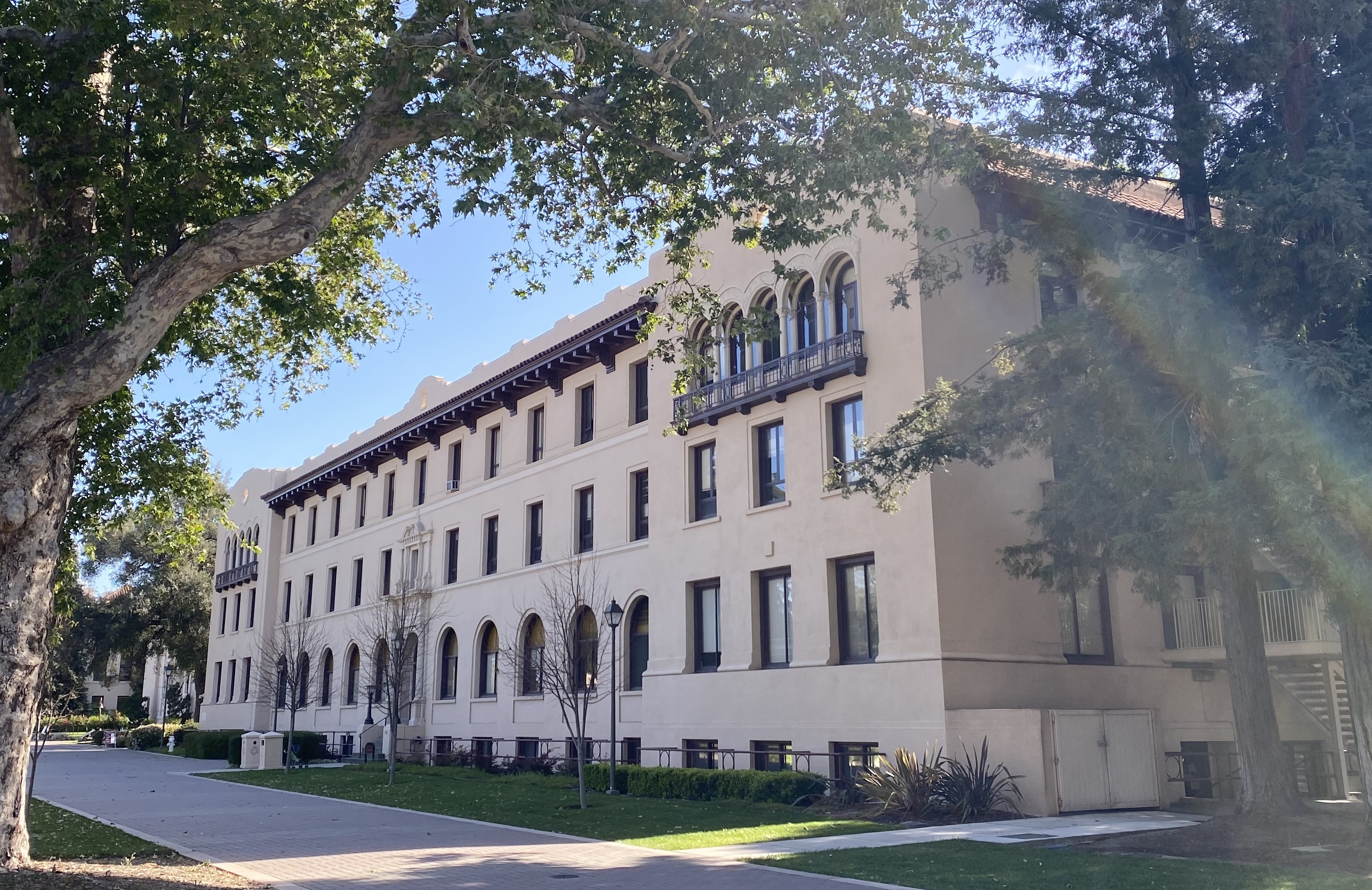
O'Connor Hall on the Alviso Mall

Four Centers of Distinction:

- The Ignatian Center for Jesuit Education is the result of a 2005 merger between the Bannan Center for Jesuit Education and the Pedro Arrupe Center for Community-Based Learning. In addition to maintaining the functions of these two programs, the center has added Kolvenbach Solidarity Programs, which focus on student immersion trips to developing countries.
- The Markkula Center for Applied Ethics provides an academic forum for research and dialogue concerning all areas of applied ethics. The center engages faculty, students, and members of the community as well as its own staff and fellows in ethical discussions in a number of focus areas, including business, health care, and biotechnology, character education, government, global leadership, technology, and emerging issues in ethics.
- The Miller Center for Social Entrepreneurship accelerates global, innovation-based entrepreneurship in service to humanity. Its strategic focus is on poverty eradication through its three areas of work: The Global Social Benefit Institute, Impact Capital, and Education and Action Research.
- The Cunningham Shoquist Center for Applied AI and Human Potential, rooted in the University’s Jesuit, humanistic mission and with a focus on real-world applications serves as an interdisciplinary hub where faculty, students, staff, and industry partners collaborate to contemplate, design, and deploy AI technologies that benefit society by enhancing efficiency, problem-solving capabilities, safety, sustainability, and quality of life.
- The Center for Professional Development is a professionally oriented organization geared towards working professionals with graduate degrees in the areas of counseling psychology and education. The accredited Center offers classes in seminar and workshop form over the weekend.
- The Osher Lifelong Learning Institute (OLLI) at Santa Clara University is endowed by the Osher Foundation and seeks to support students over the age of 50 by providing university-level courses to OLLI members.
- The Executive Development Center (EDC) is part of Santa Clara University's Leavey School of Business. The center creates custom programs to help business leaders drive success.
- The Center for Innovation and Entrepreneurship (CIE) prepares students for entrepreneurial leadership through opportunities such as networking and educational and advisor services.
- The Center for Accounting Education and Practice (CAEP) seeks to create and develop relationships between business students and faculty and Silicon Valley accounting professionals.
- The Center for Nanostructures (CNS) conducts activities in the interdisciplinary research and education of nanoscience and nanotechnology, and collaborates with the Miller Center for Social Entrepreneurship.
- The Center for Teaching Excellence
- The Equity Professional Institute
- The Civil Society Institute
- The Food & Agribusiness Institute
- The Retail Management Institute
- The Center for Global Law & Policy
- The Center for Social Justice and Public Service
- The High Tech Law Institute
- The Institute for Redress and Recovery
- The Katherine & George Alexander Community Law Center
- The Northern California Innocence Project
- The Center for Advanced Study and Practice
- California Legacy Project, preserves California's culture through a book series with publisher, Heyday Books and radio segment productions with KAZU Public Radio

== Student life ==
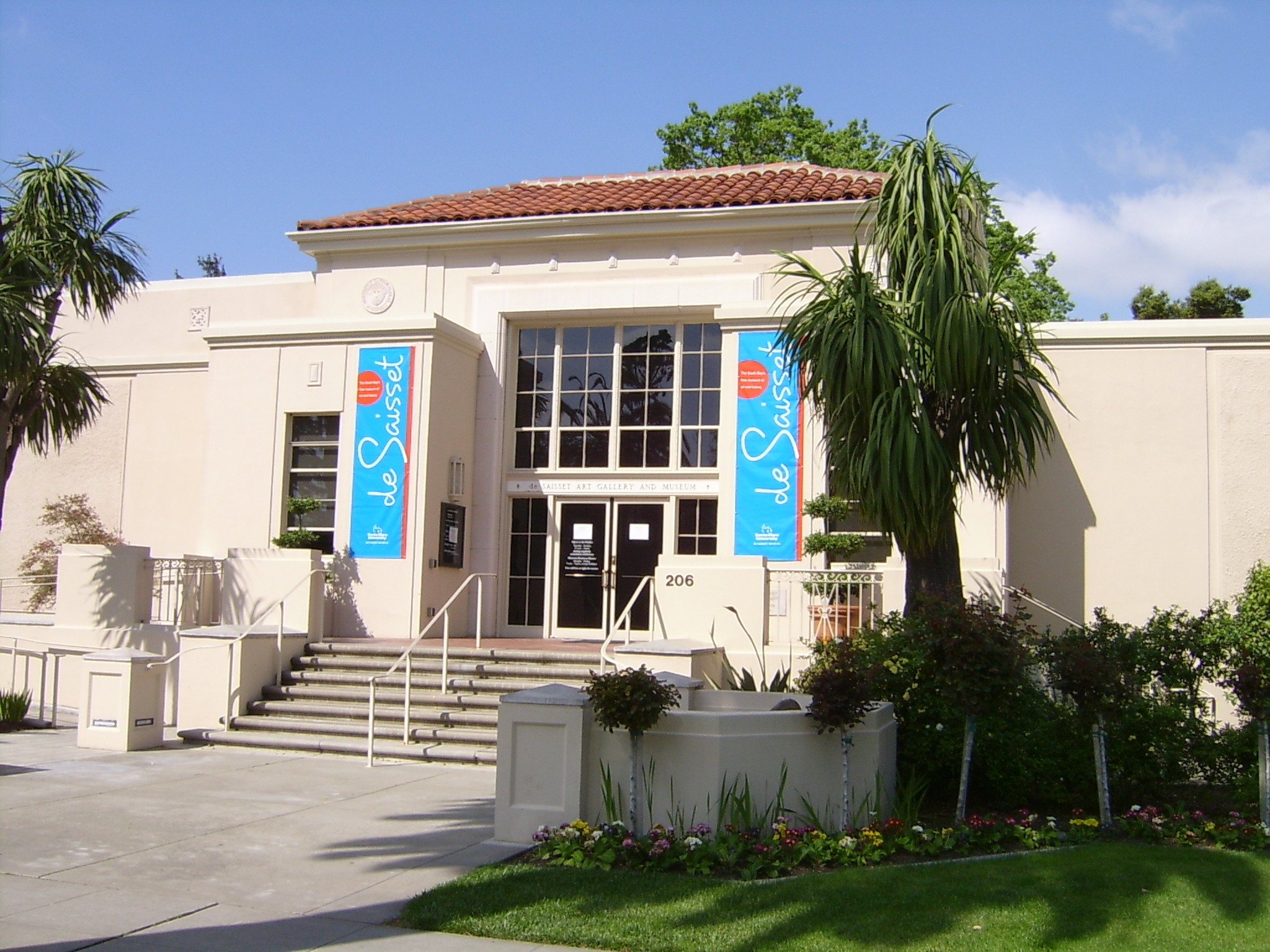
The de Saisset Museum is home to one of the finest collections of Californian history and art.

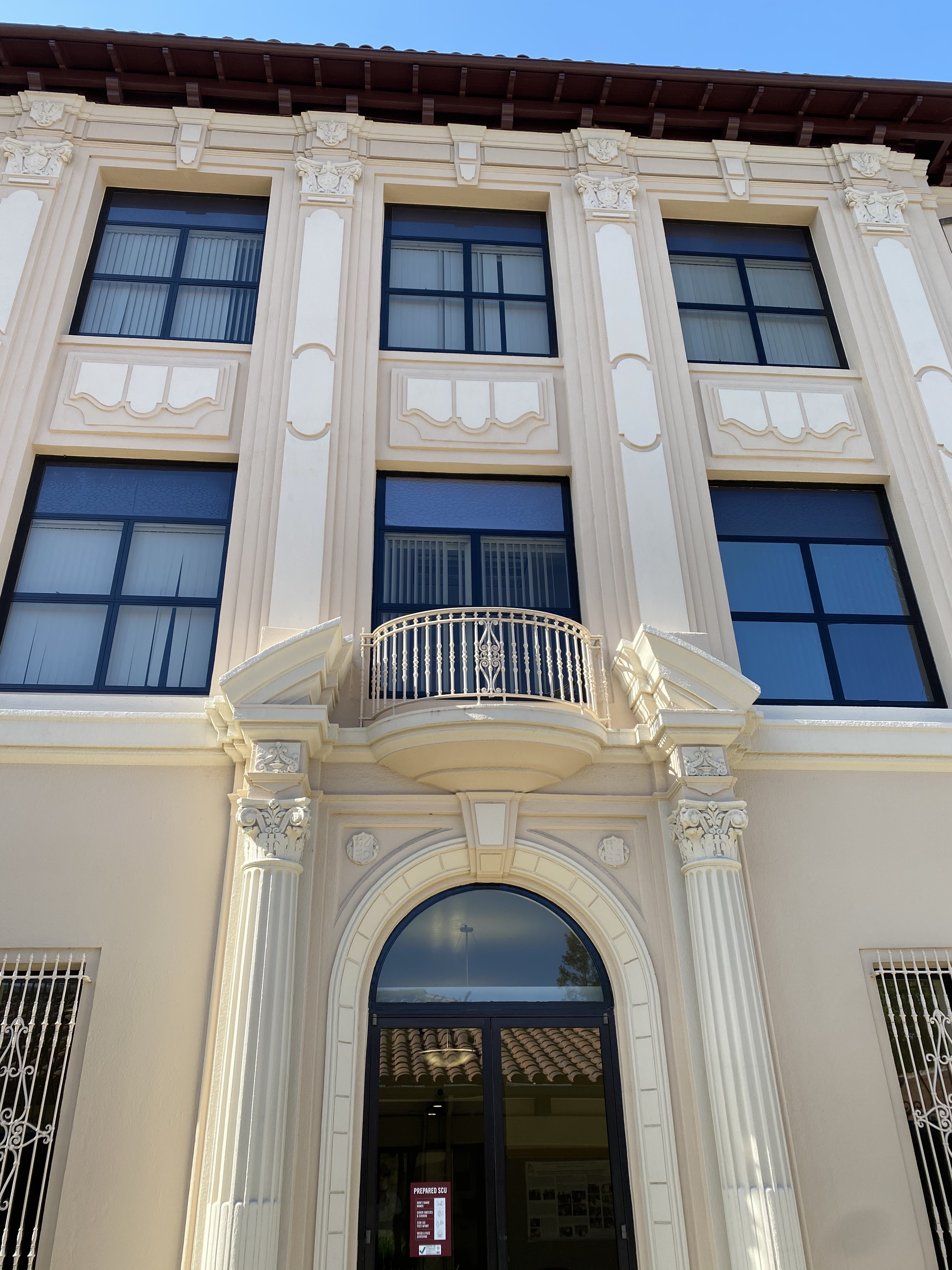
Alumni Science Building

=== Student organizations ===
Santa Clara offers its students the opportunity to engage in over 125 registered student organizations (or clubs). RSO's are partially funded by the university via the student government, ASG. These Organizations span from Athletic/Recreational, Careers/Pre-professional, Community Service, Ethnic/Cultural, Business Fraternities, Health/Counseling, Media/Publications, Music/Dance/Creative Arts, Political/Social Awareness to Religious/Philosophical.

RSO groups include:

- SCU Ski & Snowboard, the largest RSO on campus, which hosts weekly ski trips to Lake Tahoe.
- SCEO, Santa Clara Entrepreneurs Organization is an organization that hosts speakers, workshops and helps connect student entrepreneurs to investors and potential partners.
- Santa Clara Accounting Associations is a pre-professional organization aimed at mentoring students who want to enter a career in accounting, through professional and social activities.
- Santa Clara Finance is a pre-professional organization aimed at mentoring students who want to enter a career in accounting, through providing an open forum for networking, and mentoring with the business community.
- Society of Women Engineers is an organization that empowers women to succeed and advance in the field of engineering, and to be recognized for their life-changing contributions as engineers and leaders through an array of training and development programs, networking opportunities, scholarships, outreach and advocacy activities.

SCU also has nine chartered student organizations (CSOs), including:

- APB, the Activities Programming Board (est. 1994), provides university-wide programs.
- SCCAP, Santa Clara Community Action Program, is a community-based, service organization providing students the ability to volunteer in areas of empowerment, education & mentoring, homelessness, health & disabilities.
- The Redwood is the university's student-run yearbook. It was founded in 1904 and is published every spring. On June 3, 2013, The Redwood published its first complete digital interactive yearbook to the Apple App Store.
- The Santa Clara is the university's weekly student newspaper. It has been published since 1922.
- KSCU 103.3 FM is Santa Clara's own student-operated radio station.
- Santa Clara Review is a literary magazine. It publishes poetry, fiction, non-fiction, art, which are drawn nationally from students, staff, and community members.

Finally, SCU has several organizations that are not linked to the RSO or CSO structure, including:

- SCU EMS, Santa Clara University Emergency Medical Services, is a volunteer, student-run emergency service that responds to on-campus emergencies from 5 pm until 8 am.
- SCU Ruff Riders, the Athletics-focused student spirit organization

=== Outreach programs ===
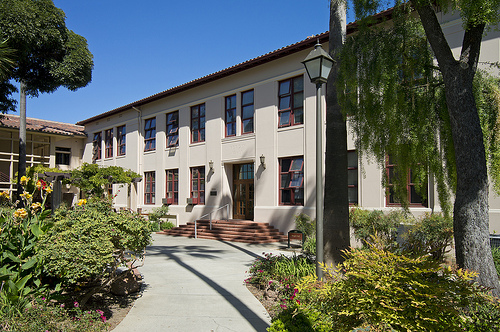
Bergin Hall

The Center for Sustainability hosts the Sustainability Liaison Network. The Network consists of over 150 Sustainability Liaisons that act as peer educators for sustainability and experts on how sustainability interplays with their respective groups. The Network is a resource and collaborative space for people who are interested in working/living more sustainably in their life on and off campus.

At the start of the 2015 academic year, Santa Clara University announced the creation of the Campus Sustainability Investment Fund (CSIF) as a revolving green fund to support sustainability projects on the SCU campus. Similar green funds at other college campuses have netted projects like installing motion-sense lights in classrooms or information campaigns to encourage the use of re-usable water bottles.

=== Student government ===
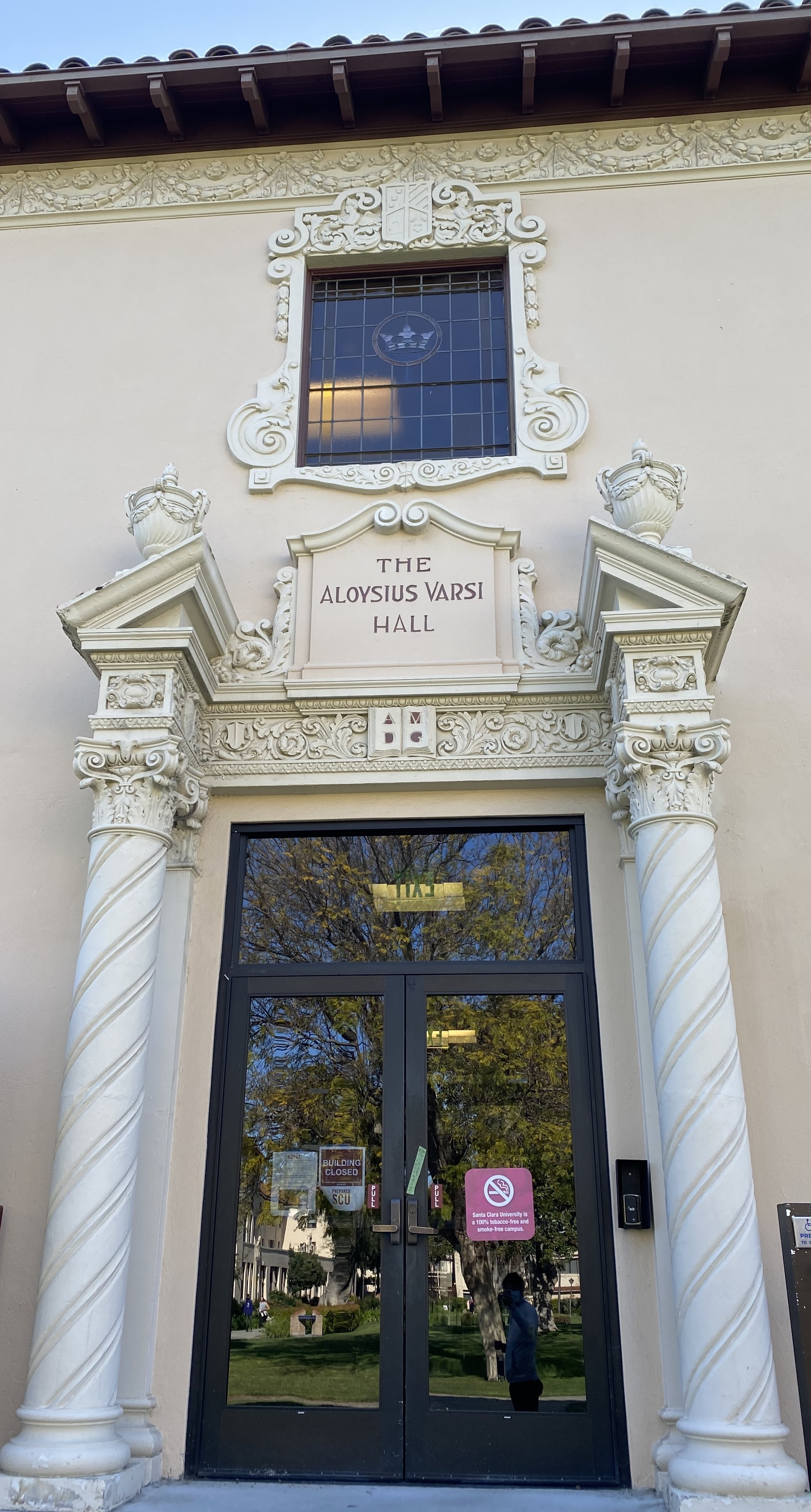
Varsi Hall

The Associated Student Government of Santa Clara University (ASGSCU) is Santa Clara University's student government, an elected representative body for undergraduate students. The Associated Student Government is made up of the executive board, the Senate, Community Development, and the Judicial Branch.

=== ROTC ===
The Santa Clara US Army ROTC Battalion was established in 1861 due to the outbreak of the American Civil War. The unit was known as the Senior Company of Cadets. On September 10, 1863, Leland Stanford, then Governor of California, presented the Corps of Cadets with forty Springfield rifles, Model 1839. Today, the rifles are preserved in the University Museum. In return for his generosity, an armory was built in his honor in 1936. The armory was located southwest of the athletic field with the pistol range located below the stage of the auditorium.

Paul Locatelli, (former) president of Santa Clara, was a cadet at the university prior to his military service and his entrance into the Jesuit Order. Two Jesuits from Santa Clara, McKinnon and McQuaide, volunteered as chaplains in the Spanish–American War. Both were part of Theodore Roosevelt's American Expeditionary Force that attacked San Juan Hill on July 1, 1898.

On February 2, 2010, the Santa Clara University ROTC "Bronco Battalion" won the MacArthur Award granted by the U.S. Army's Cadet Command and the General Douglas MacArthur Foundation. In 2011 the Santa Clara ROTC once again won the MacArthur Award. The award, named after late General Douglas MacArthur, is granted to the year's most excellent Reserve Officers' Training Corps program among 33 battalions in the West Coast eighth Brigade. The award takes into consideration factors such as the battalion's physical fitness, navigation skills, leadership, and success in commissioning officers after ROTC.

== Athletics ==
Official Athletics wordmark

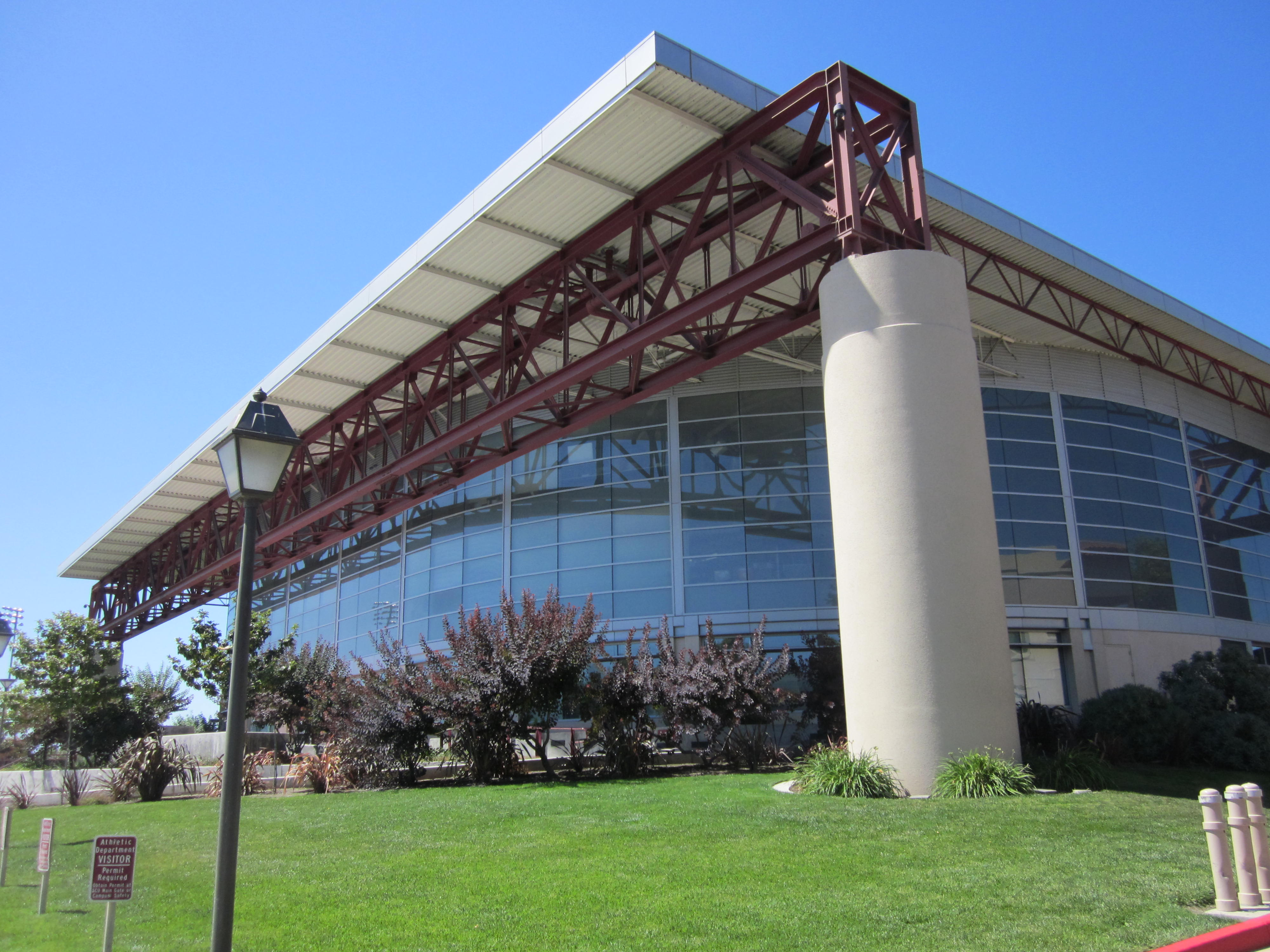
The Leavey Center

Santa Clara participates in NCAA's Division I and is a member of the West Coast Conference. It also participates in the West Water Polo Association for both men's and women's waterpolo. Santa Clara has 19 varsity sports (10 female, 9 male) and 18 club sports. The school colors are Santa Clara red and white (the school's football team uniforms featured gold trim) and the team mascot is the "Bronco," in past illustrations depicted as a "bucking bronco." The school is renowned for its successful men's and women's soccer programs in addition to historically successful men's basketball teams. Santa Clara athletes have participated in 12 different Olympic Games.

=== Athletic programs ===
On February 2, 1993, Santa Clara president Paul Locatelli, S.J. announced the discontinuation of football at the university. For many years, Santa Clara participated in NCAA Division II in football, including reaching the NCAA Division II Championship semi-finals in 1980, because of an NCAA bylaw that allowed Division I schools to participate in lower divisions in football; however, the rule was changed in the mid-1990s, and the program was forced to move into Division I-AA (now FCS). Other teams were Division I, including the men's and women's soccer teams, both of which are past NCAA Division I National Champions. The basketball teams have made regular appearances in NCAA Division I playoffs.

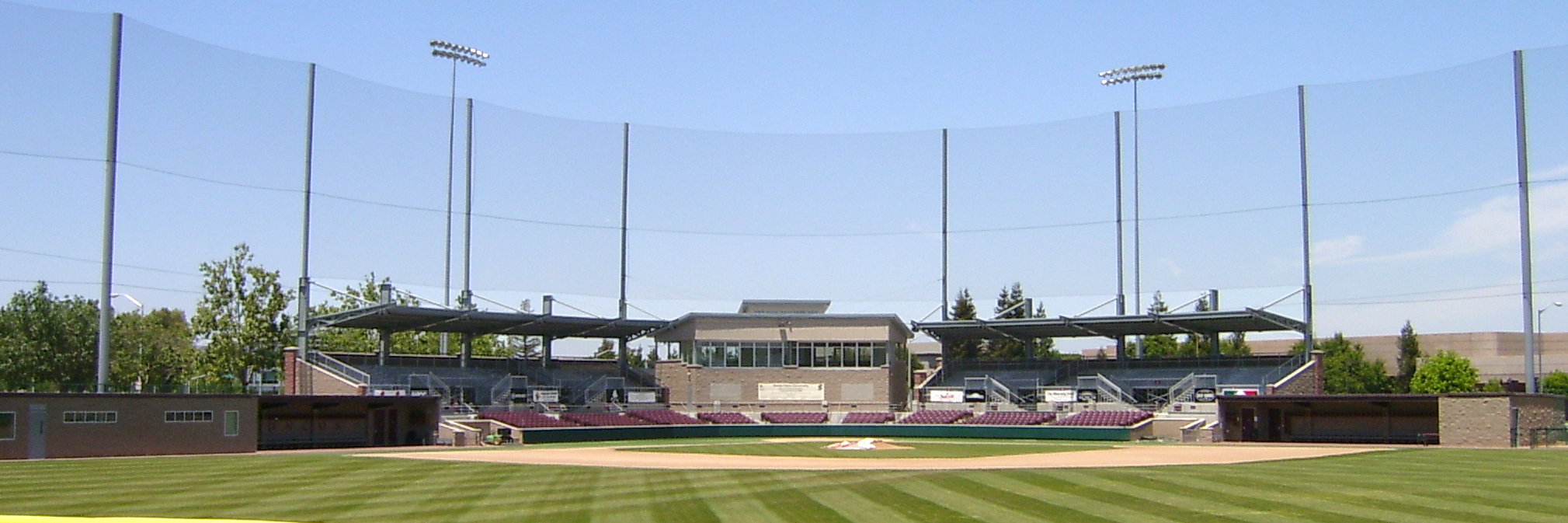
Stephen Schott Stadium

- The women's soccer team is consistently ranked in the top 25 nationally. Jerry Smith is the current head coach and led the program to a national title in the 2001 and 2020 NCAA Women's Soccer Championship. The 2001 team was led by future United States Women's National Soccer Team member Aly Wagner. Now married to Jerry Smith, Brandi Chastain was a member of the team's 1988 and 1989 final four seasons. Keira Knightley and Parminder Nagra's characters win soccer scholarships to Santa Clara in the film Bend It Like Beckham.
- The men's basketball team has participated in the NCAA tournament on several occasions in past decades; the 1992–1993 team (led by future NBA MVP Steve Nash) was the second of seven No. 15 seeds to defeat Arizona the No. 2 seed in the tourney. On February 12, 2007, the men's basketball team snapped Gonzaga's 50-game home winning streak. At the time, it was the longest home winning streak in the NCAA.
- The women's basketball team started in 1963. Their most notable accomplishment was winning the WNIT in 1991. In 2014, JR Payne was hired as the coach.
- The men's baseball program holds the best single-season record in program history, 43–18–1, participated in the West I Regional at Fresno State. That 1988 team lost in the regional to a John Olerud–led Washington State Cougar team, twice. The team was led by current Long Beach State coach Troy Buckley, World Series Champion Ed Giovanola (Atlanta Braves 1996), Detroit Tiger first round pick Greg Gohr (1989), Kansas City Royal draft choice Victor Cole (1988), San Diego Padres draftee Matt Toole (1989), and Wes Bliven, a California Angel draft choice (1988). During the regular season, the 1988 squad snapped the 33 game winning streak of Fresno State. That team also knocked off nationally ranked teams such as Stanford University, UC Berkeley, Loyola Marymount University, and Pepperdine University. The coach of the 1988 team was John Oldham.

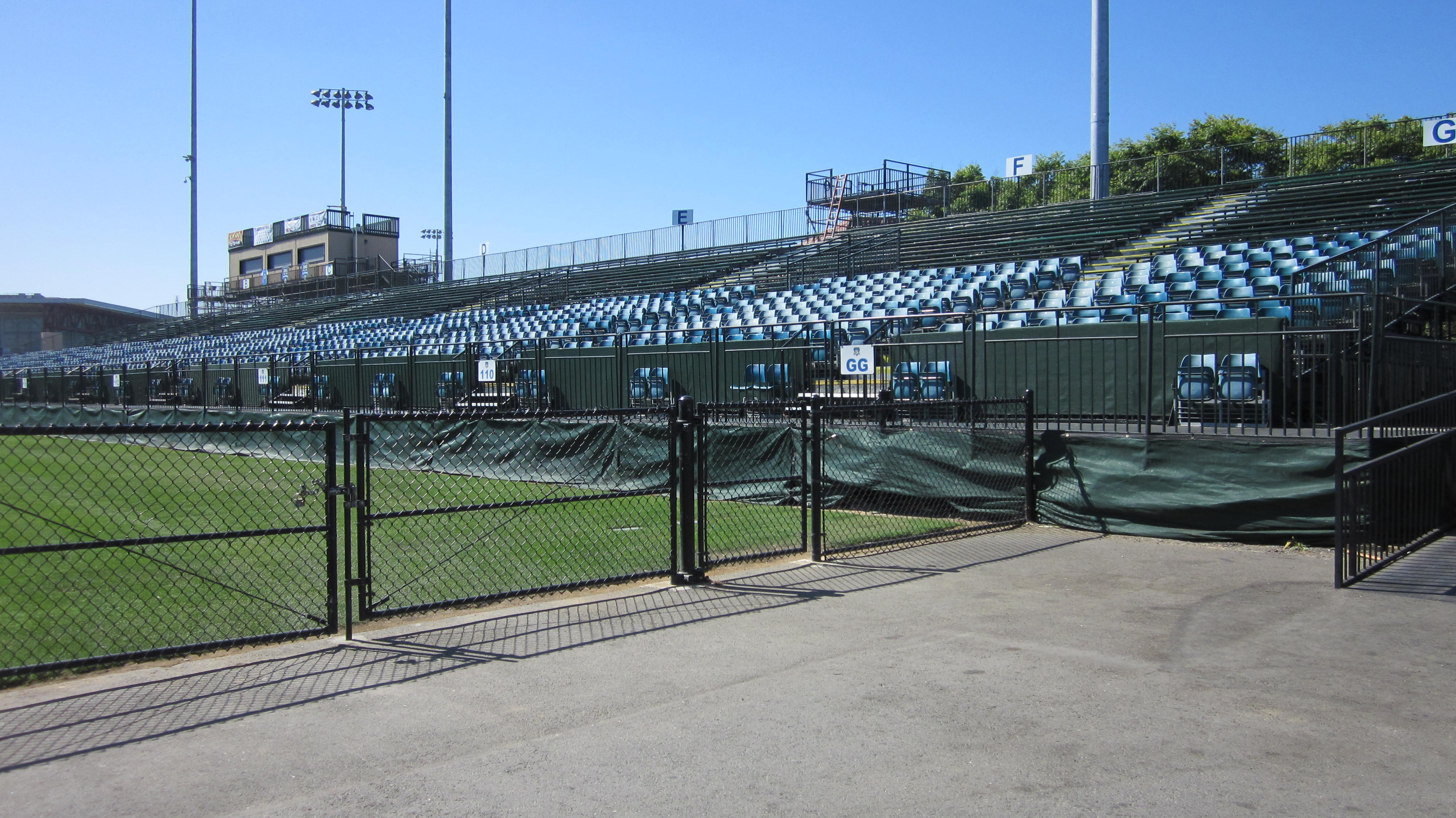
Stevens Stadium

=== Club sports programs ===
Sports include boxing, cycling, equestrian, paintball, men's lacrosse, women's lacrosse, men's rugby, women's rugby, men's Ultimate, women's Ultimate, men's volleyball, women's volleyball, men's ice hockey, sailing, Shotokan karate, swimming, triathlon, and women's field hockey.

=== Athletic facilities ===
- Buck Shaw Stadium: Named after Lawrence T. "Buck" Shaw, the school's football coach (1936–1942) and an inductee into the College Football Hall of Fame. Shaw later coached at the University of California, Berkeley, and with the San Francisco 49ers and Philadelphia Eagles, whom he guided to the NFL Championship in 1960. The stadium, longtime home of Bronco football and baseball, is now entirely dedicated to SCU's soccer programs. The stadium was expanded to 10,300 seats after the 2007 season, and the soccer pitch and stadium facilities were modernized and improved. The stadium was temporarily home to Major League Soccer's San Jose Earthquakes, who began their return to the league in April 2008.
- Leavey Center: Santa Clara University's Arena is home to the men's and women's basketball teams and volleyball team. The Leavey Center is used as a concert venue and a hall for large lectures and speeches. The Leavey Center houses athletic department offices, a weight room, an academic center, team rooms, a video control room, lower and upper-level seating, and a suite that overlooks the court. The university's pool is adjacent to the arena. The Leavey Center has a capacity of 4,500.
- SCU Softball Stadium; Located adjacent to Bellomy Field and the Leavey Center. Prior to the construction of this stadium, home games were played at West Valley College.
- Stephen Schott Stadium: Home to Santa Clara's baseball team, the $8.6 million Stephen Schott Stadium opened in April 2005. The stadium seats 1,500 fans in the stands and has additional seating in a suite.
- Degheri Tennis Center: Home to Santa Clara's Men's and Women's tennis team, the Santa Clara University tennis center opened in 1999 at a cost of $2.5 million. The facility includes nine championship-lighted courts and seats for 750 spectators.
- The Sullivan Aquatic Center: Home to Santa Clara's men's and women's water polo teams, it opened in late 2008.
- Wipfler Family Golf Facility: Home to Santa Clara's golf teams. It offers a lounge area, two enclosed hitting bays, and an artificial turf short game area. It opened in the summer of 2024.

== Faculty and alumni ==
Santa Clara's faculty and alumni include U.S. senators and House representatives, a Pulitzer Prize winner, billionaires and U.S. governors, a director of the CIA, a U.S. secretary of defense, a U.S. secretary of agriculture, a White House press secretary and a United States secretary of homeland security. Santa Clara has Fulbright Scholars as well as four Rhodes Scholars.

Notable alumni of Santa Clara University

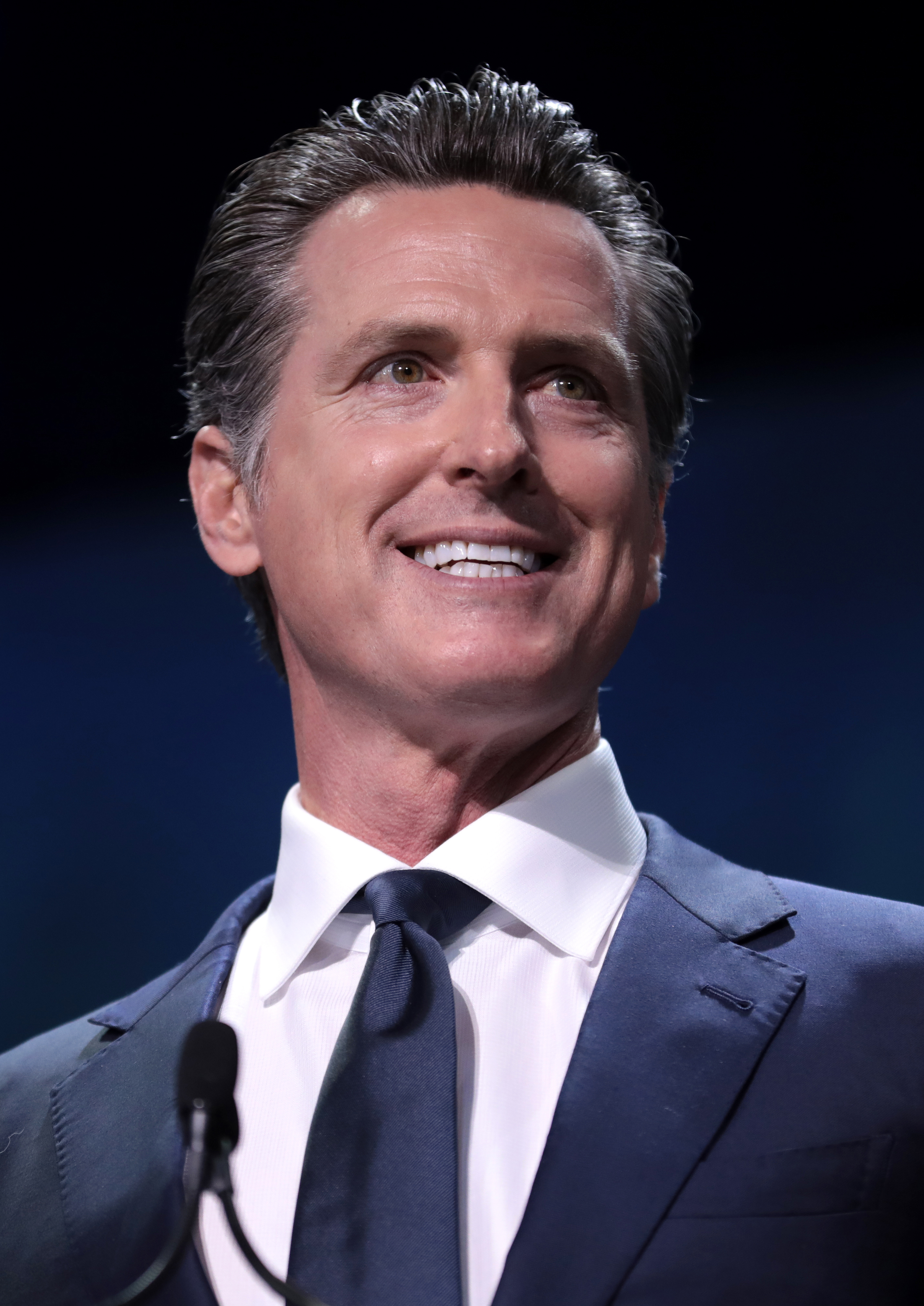
Gavin Newsom, current governor of California

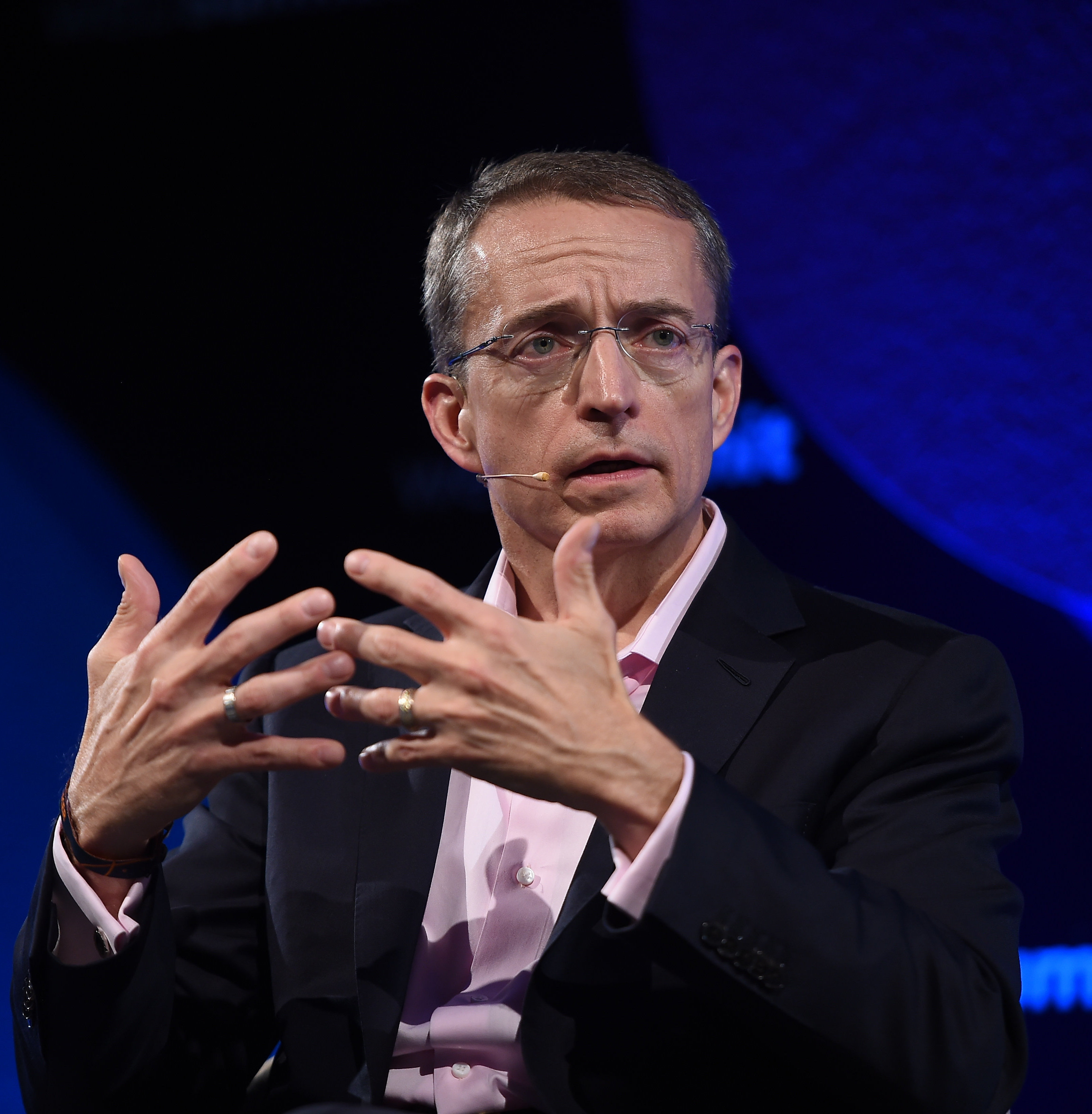
Pat Gelsinger, former CEO of Intel

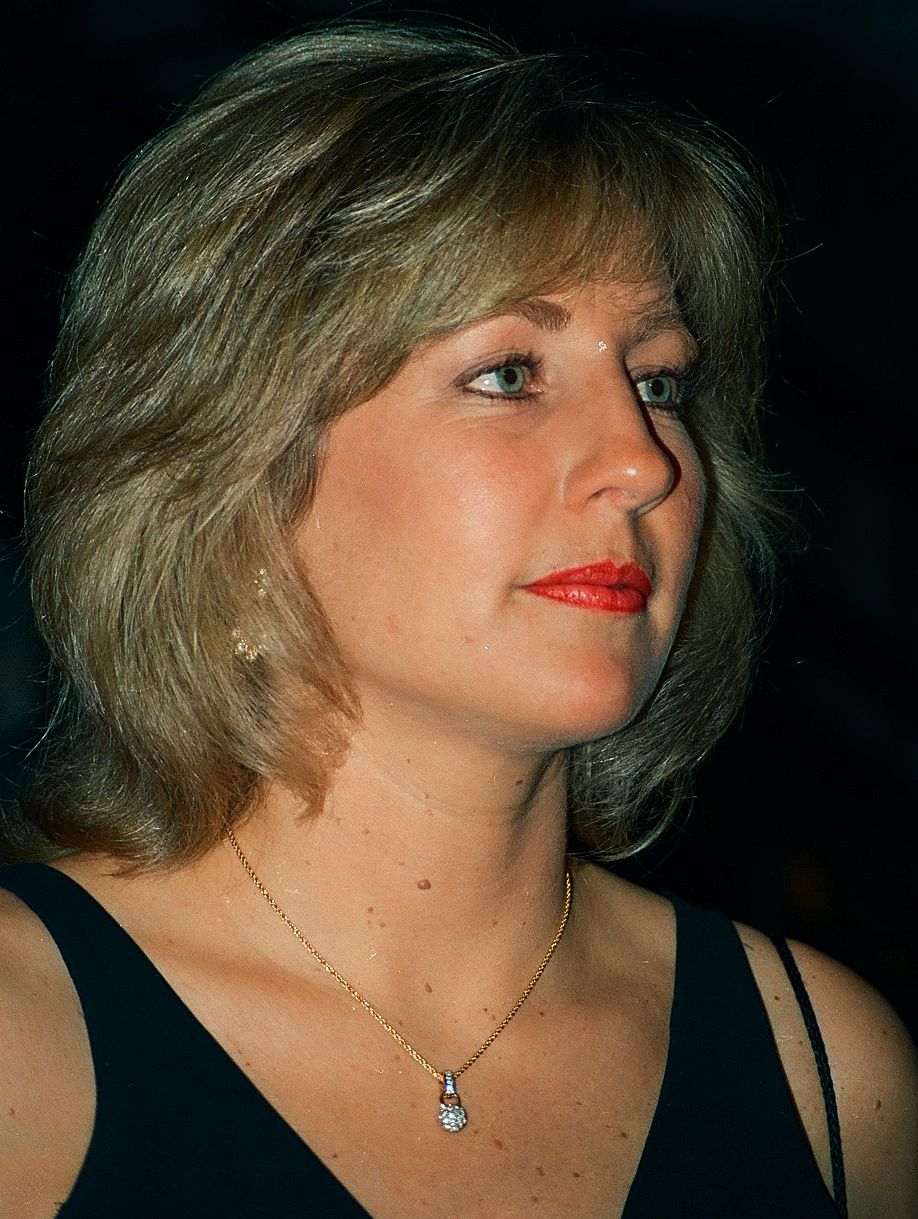
Dee Dee Myers, first woman to serve as White House Press Secretary

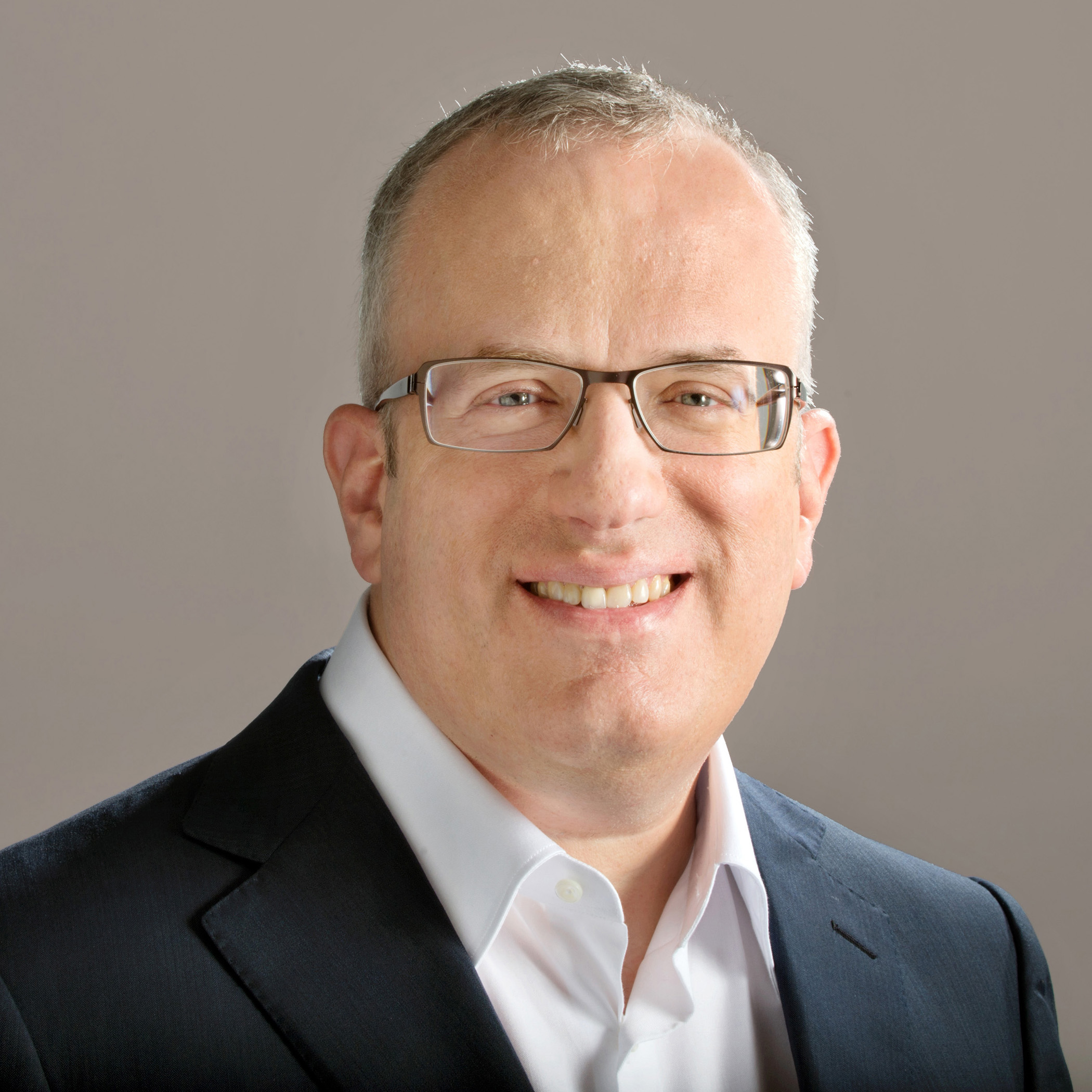
Brendan Eich, creator of JavaScript and founder of Mozilla

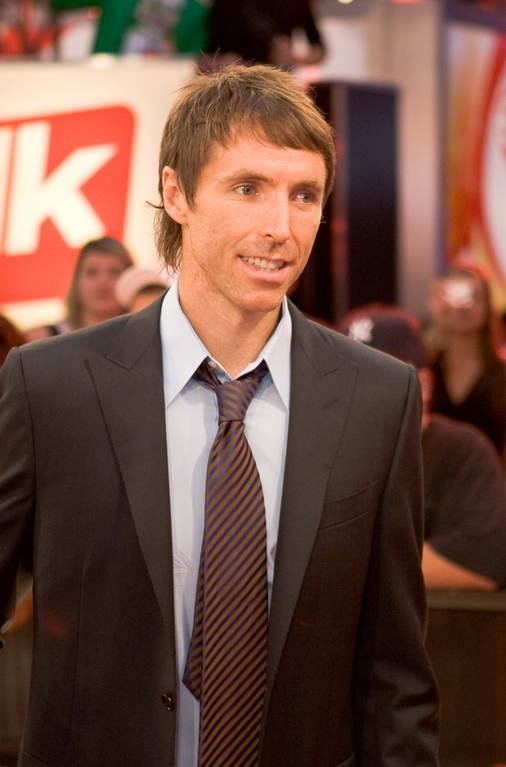
Steve Nash, 2-time NBA MVP

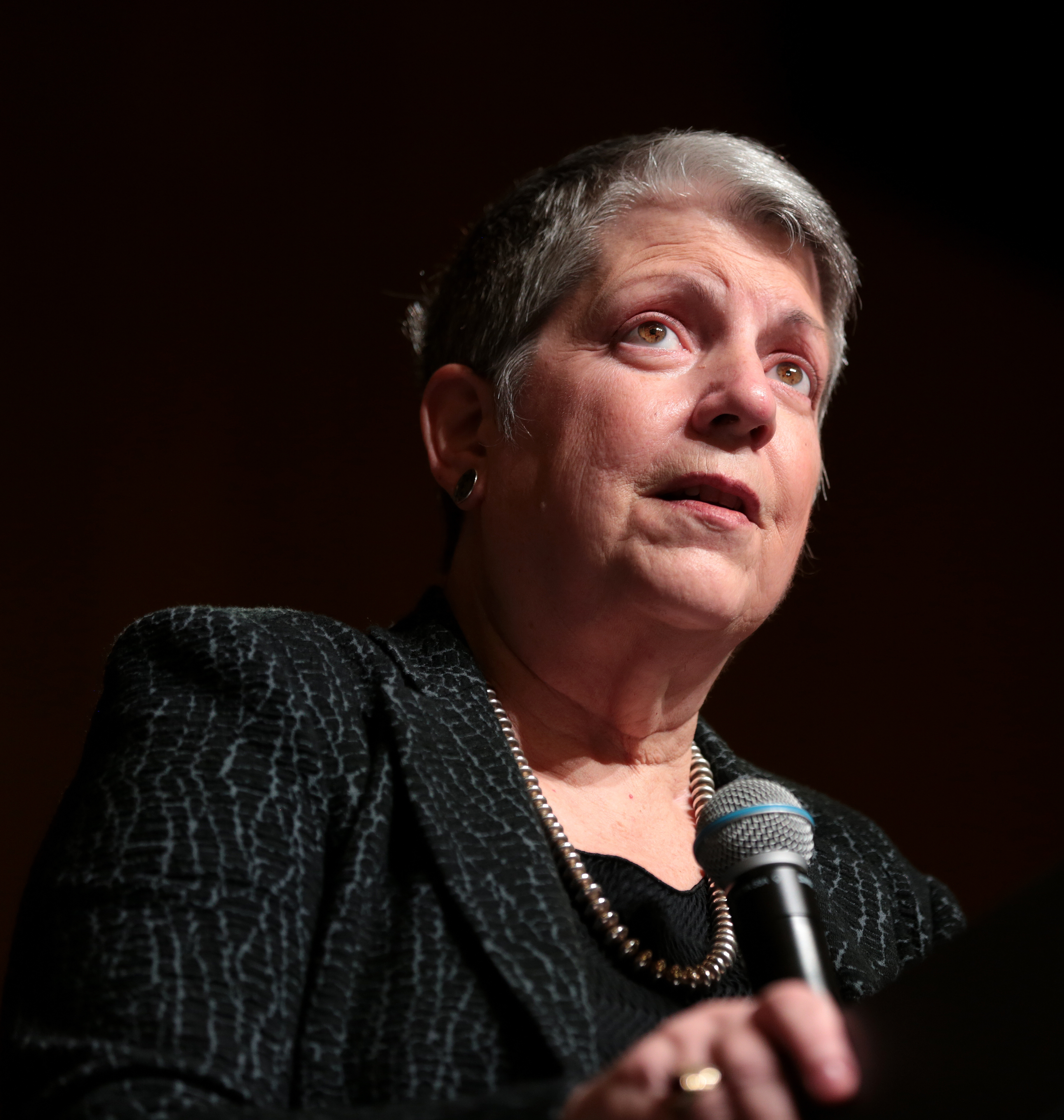
Janet Napolitano, former U.S. Secretary of Homeland Security and governor of Arizona

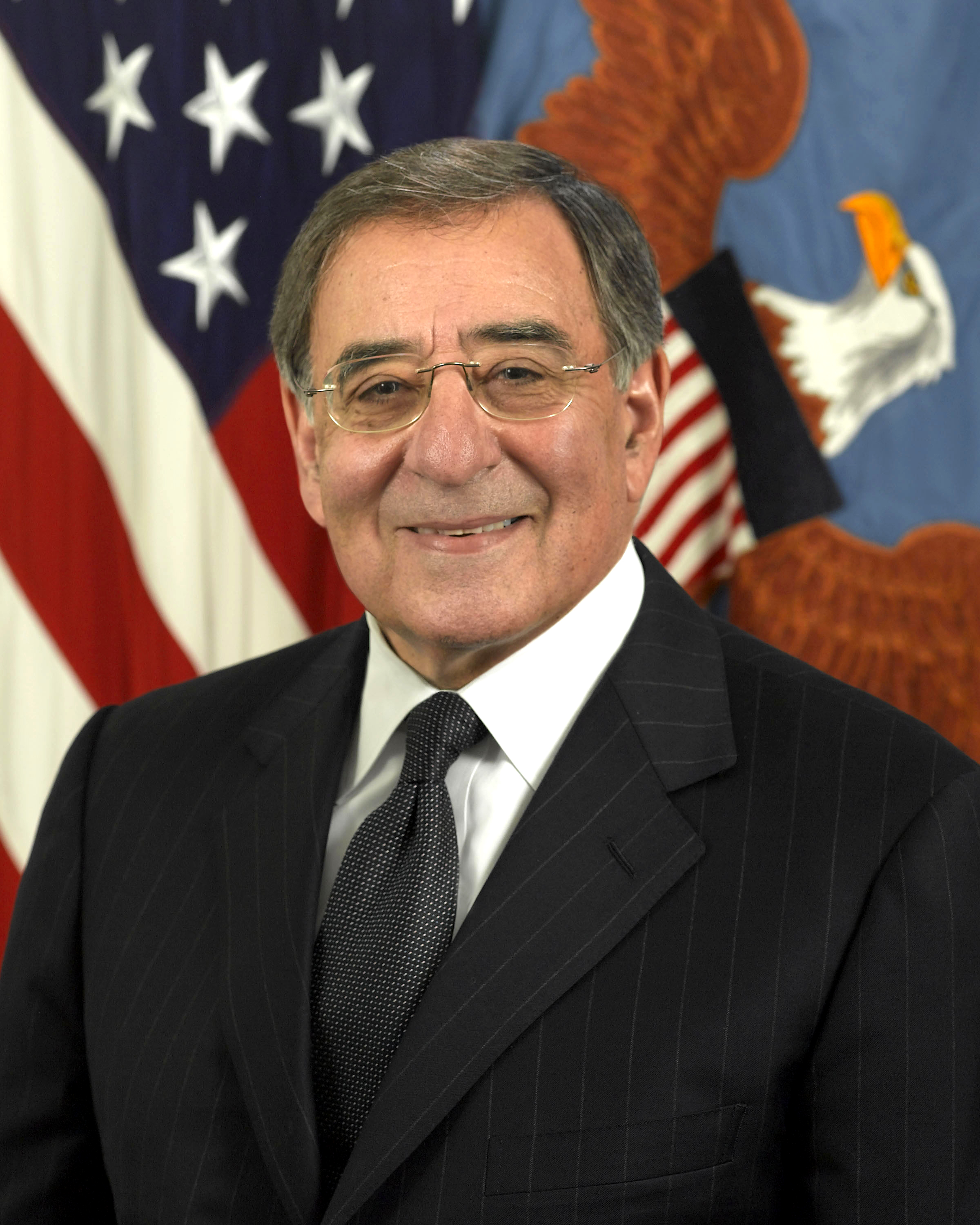
Leon Panetta, former U.S. Secretary of Defense and director of the CIA

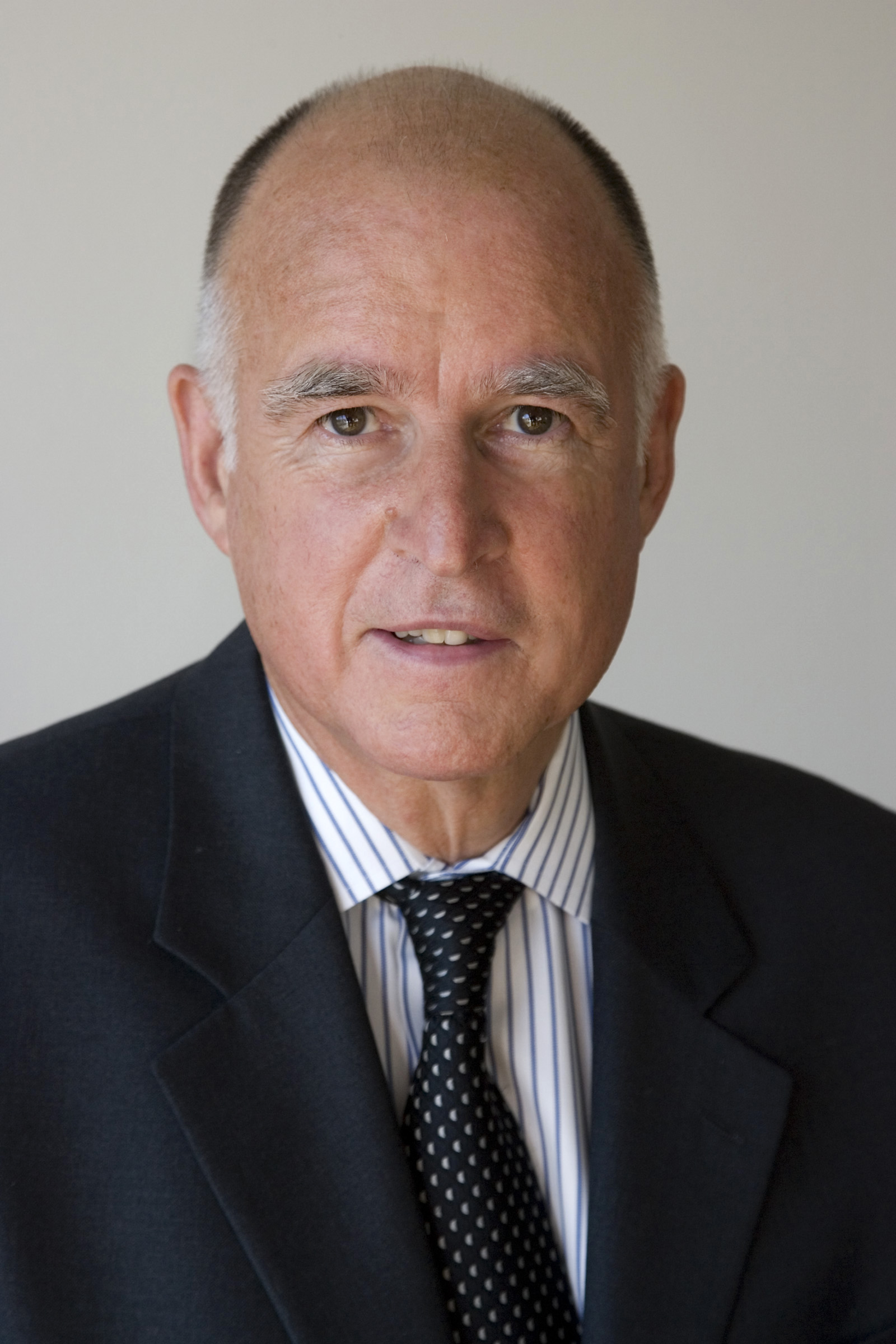
Jerry Brown, 34th and 39th governor of California

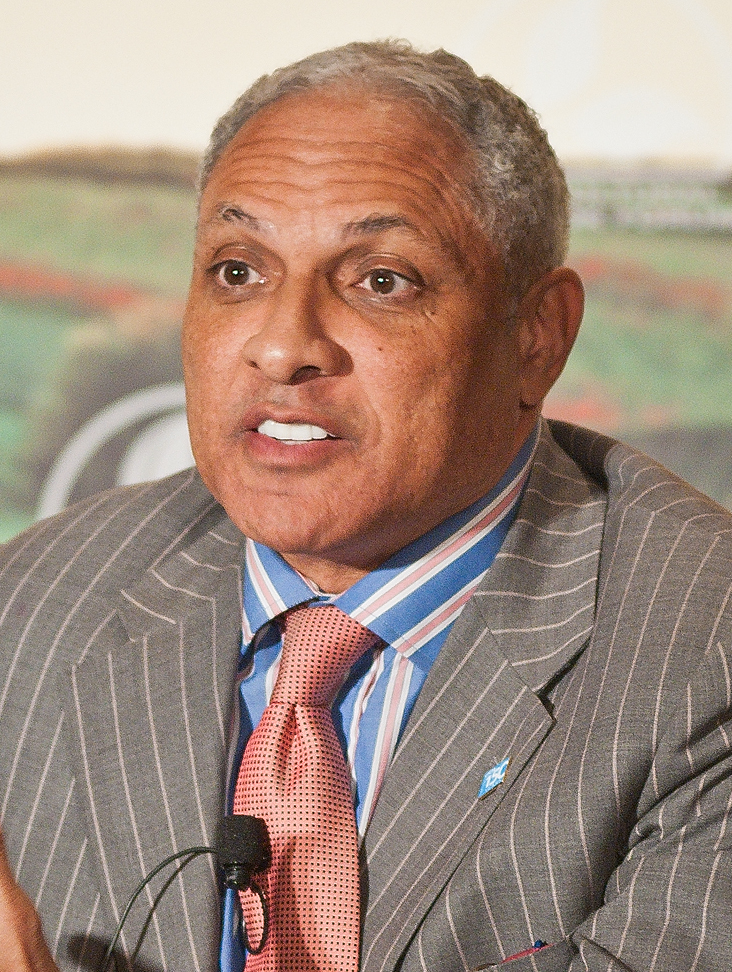
Mike Espy, first African-American U.S. Secretary of Agriculture
