= Counseling psychology =

Counseling theory

- ICD-10-PCS: GZ6
- ICD-9-CM: 94.45-94.49
- MeSH: D003376

Counseling or counselling psychology is an international discipline. It is practiced in the United States and Canada, the United Kingdom and Ireland, Australia and New Zealand, Hong Kong and Korea, and South Africa.

Counseling psychology in the United States initially focused on vocational counseling but later focused upon adjustment counseling. It currently includes many sub-disciplines, for example marriage and family counseling, rehabilitation counseling, clinical mental health counseling, educational counseling, etc. In each setting, they are all required to follow the same guidelines.

The Society for Counseling Psychology in the United States states:

Counseling Psychology is a generalist health service (HSP) specialty in professional psychology that uses a broad range of culturally informed and culturally sensitive practices to help people improve their well-being, prevent and alleviate distress and maladjustment, resolve crises, and increase their ability to function better in their lives. It focuses specifically but not exclusively on normative life-span development, with a particular emphasis on prevention and education as well as amelioration, addressing individuals as well as the systems or contexts in which they function. It has particular expertise in work and career issues.

== History ==
=== Before the end of World War II ===
Before World War II, qualified psychologists in the United States typically pursued science, rather than the direct treatment of patients. This task was the domain of psychiatrists who had both a medical degree and psychological training.

In 1896, the first psychological patient clinic was opened at the University of Pennsylvania by psychologist Lightner Witmer. He coined the term clinical psychology to describe his work. In the first half of the 20th century, clinical psychology focused on children's psychological assessment, with little attention given to treatment or adults.

The Vocation Bureau was established in Boston in 1908 by Frank Parsons. Parsons coined the term vocational guidance that year, and the Bureau soon became the concept's national body. The Bureau supported the work of vocational counselors, and successfully advocated for a large number of them to be appointed by Boston schools. Parson's influential book Choosing a Vocation was published in 1909. The Boston YMCA offered the first vocational guidance training.

Building on the work of the Bureau, the National Vocational Guidance Association (NVGA) was founded in 1913.

The National Social Workers' Exchange began in 1917, and in 1921 expanded its scope and became the American Association of Social Workers.

Abraham and Hannah Stone began a marriage consultation centre in New York in 1929. The American Institute for Family Relations (AIFR) was established by Paul Popenoe in Los Angeles in 1930. Emily Mudd founded the Marriage Council of Philadelphia in 1932. This kind of organisation was first found in Germany, and had grown through parts of Europe.

During World War II, the term counseling was used by American psychologist Carl Rogers to describe therapy provided by psychologists. In 1942, Rogers published the book Counseling and Psychotherapy. In that book's introduction he said the terms "counselling" and "psychotherapy" were equivalents, the main difference being that different professions tended to use one term or the other. He noted that people who did this work might call themselves "a psychologist, a college counselor, a marital adviser, a psychiatrist, a social worker, a high-school guidance counselor, an industrial personnel worker, or [use] some other name."

1942 also saw the establishment of the American Association of Marriage Counselors (AAMC). The Stones and Mudd took part in this.

=== A great adjustment ===
The end of World War II in 1945 saw many combatants return home. Over 3.2 million American veterans applied for training under the GI Bill, creating a strong need for vocational and personal adjustment counseling at the US Veterans Administration (VA). That year, Rogers was invited to set up a counseling center at the University of Chicago.

It was also at this time that clinical psychologists began offering therapy to adults in large numbers, with many employed by the VA.

The end of the war also saw the American Psychological Association establish Divisions, providing interest groups for its members to join. Divisions 11 and 12 of were formed in 1945, with the two merging in 1946 to become the "Division of Clinical and Abnormal Psychology" (as Division 12).

Division 17 of the APA was formed in 1946 as the "Division of Personnel and Guidance Psychologists".

Also in 1946, Connecticut became the first US state to require psychologists to be licensed. The last to do so was Missouri in 1977.

In 1947, Rogers was elected president of the APA.

The Marriage Council of Philadelphia started the first US marriage counsellor training program in 1948, training Navy chaplains.

It was suggested that "personal adjustment counseling is actually a psychotherapeutic supplement to vocational counseling for problems not serious enough to require psychiatric treatments," in 1949.

More than 500 people had joined Division 17 in 1949. Around half of these provided guidance (or supervised it) in an educational setting. Approximately 20% guided people in the VA. 40% of Division 17 members were also members of the NVGA.

=== Counseling psychology and other counseling ===
In 1951, the APA's Division 17 became the "Division for Counseling Psychology". This body united psychologists, students and professionals who were dedicated to promote education and training, practice, scientific investigation, diversity and public interest in the field of counseling psychology. (It would later become known as the "Society for Counseling Psychology").

In 1952, the American Personnel and Guidance Association (APGA) was founded, merging the NVGA, the National Association of Guidance and Counselor Trainers (NAGCT), the Student Personnel Association for Teacher Education (SPATE), and the American College Personnel Association (ACPA).

Starting in the early 1950s, the first counseling psychology PhD programs were at the University of Minnesota; Ohio State University; University of Maryland, College Park; University of Missouri; Teachers College, Columbia University; and University of Texas at Austin.

At times, counseling psychologists with qualifications from university education departments had difficulty being registered as psychologists by US states, due to difficulty proving that their study was sufficiently psychological in nature.

In 1955, the National Association of Social Workers was established through the consolidation of seven groups including the American Association of Social Workers and the National Association of School Social Workers.

In 1960, the AIFR in Los Angeles was described "the world's largest and best known marriage-counseling center," with a staff of seventy. By that year, the institute had given training to over 300 marriage counselors and shorter courses around the US to over 1500 other people.

The US National Association of School Psychologists (NASP) began in 1969.

The AAMC became the American Association for Marriage and Family Therapy (AAMFT) in 1974.

In 1976, the American Mental Health Counselors Association (AMHCA) was founded to represent mental health counselors who did not qualify for APA membership, and didn't fit in the college counseling focused APGA. The AMHCA became a part of the latter in 1978.

Individual US states began to license counselors in the 1970s. In 1981, the APGA established The Council for Accreditation of Counseling and Related Educational Programs to standardise counseling education. In 1982, the APGA established an independent body, the National Board for Certified Counselors (NBCC), to provide a national certification system for counselors who were not qualified psychologists.

The APGA changed its name in 1983 to the "American Association of Counseling and Development" (AACD), and then in 1992 to the "American Counseling Association" (ACA). (Also in 1992, the ACPA left the organisation.)

The AIFR ceased operating in the 1980s.

A 1986 study found that of APA Division 17 members, 80% did personal adjustment counseling, 71% did vocational counseling, 69% did long-term psychotherapy and 58% did family counseling. It found that "there appear to be few, if any, empirical bases on which to distinguish counseling psychologists from their colleagues in clinical psychology."

In the late 1980s and 1990s, US states increasingly required the licensing of family councilors. The Association of Marital & Family Therapy Regulatory Boards was established to allow for nationally harmonised accreditation.

The ACA defined "counseling" in 2010 as "a professional relationship that empowers diverse individuals, families, and groups to accomplish mental health, wellness, education, and career goals."

In 2019, the American Mental Health Counselors Association (AMHCA) separated from the ACA.

As much as their practitioners did many of the same things, clinical psychology came to focus on treating abnormal psychology issues, while counseling psychology came to focus on addressing normal psychology matters.

Counseling, as overseen by the ACA and AMHCA, came to include all the subject areas listed by Rogers in 1942 that didn't require its practitioners to have psychology or psychiatry qualifications, including those that use "some other name". However, while it had Divisions for family counseling and social work, other bodies would have many more members from those fields.

Many US states now require people describing themselves as counselors to be licensed by the NBCC, such counselors becoming a National Certified Counselor.

Books describing the present international state of the field include the Handbook of Counseling and Psychotherapy in an International Context; the International Handbook of Cross-Cultural Counseling; and Counseling Around the World: An International Handbook. Taken together these volumes trace the global history of the field; explore divergent philosophical assumptions, counseling theories, processes, and trends in different countries; and review a variety of global counselor education programs. Moreover, traditional and indigenous treatment and healing methods that may predate modern counseling methods by hundreds of years remain of significance in many non-Western and Western countries.

== Variables in the Counseling Process ==
Counseling psychologists are interested in answering a variety of research questions about counseling process and outcome. Counseling process refers to how or why counseling happens and progresses. Currently, it is becoming more common for one to be concerned with their emotions and motivations, as well as learning how to control and manage their unwanted habits or emotions. Counseling psychology is sometimes used in order to achieve this. Counseling outcome addresses whether counseling is effective, under what conditions it is effective, and what outcomes are considered effective—such as symptom reduction, behavior change, or quality of life improvement. Topics commonly explored in the study of counseling process and outcome include therapist variables, client variables, the counseling or therapeutic relationship, cultural variables, process and outcome measurement, mechanisms of change, and process and outcome research methods. Classic approaches appeared early in the US in the field of humanistic psychology by Carl Rogers who identified the mission of the counseling interview as "to permit deeper expression that the client would ordinarily allow himself"

=== Therapist variables ===
Therapist variables include characteristics of a counselor or psychotherapist, as well as therapist technique, behavior, theoretical orientation and training. In terms of therapist behavior, technique and theoretical orientation, research on adherence to therapy models has found that adherence to a particular model of therapy can be helpful, detrimental, or neutral in terms of impact on outcome.

A recent meta-analysis of research on training and experience suggests that experience level is only slightly related to accuracy in clinical judgment. Higher therapist experience has been found to be related to less anxiety, but also less focus. This suggests that there is still work to be done in terms of training clinicians and measuring successful training.

=== Client variables ===
Client characteristics such as help-seeking attitudes and attachment style have been found to be related to client use of counseling, as well as expectations and outcome. Stigma against mental illness can keep people from acknowledging problems and seeking help. Public stigma has been found to be related to self-stigma, negative attitudes towards counseling, and unwillingness to seek help.

In terms of attachment style, clients with avoidant styles have been found to perceive greater risks and fewer benefits to counseling, and are less likely to seek professional help, than securely attached clients. Those with anxious attachment styles perceive greater benefits, as well as risks, to counseling. Educating clients about what to expect from counseling can improve client satisfaction, treatment duration and outcomes, and is an efficient and cost-effective intervention.

=== Counseling relationship ===
The relationship between a counselor and a client consists in the feelings and attitudes that a client and therapist have towards one another and the manner in which those feelings and attitudes are expressed. Some theorists have suggested that the relationship may be thought of in three parts: transference and countertransference, working alliance, and the real—or personal—relationship. Other theorists argue that the concepts of transference and countertransference are outdated and inadequate.

Transference can be described as the client's distorted perceptions of the therapist, which can significantly affect the therapeutic relationship. For instance, if the therapist may have a facial feature that reminds the client of their parent, the client may associate the therapist with the parent and project strong positive or negative feelings onto the therapist. This can affect the therapeutic relationship in a few ways. For example, if the client has a very strong bond with their parent, they may see the therapist as a father or mother figure and have a strong connection with the therapist, potentially compromising the professional distance the therapist is ethically required to maintain. On the other hand, if the client has a very negative relationship with their parent, the client may feel negative feelings toward the therapist, which can also affect the therapeutic relationship. For example, a client projecting feelings of distrust toward their parent onto their therapist may have trouble opening up to the therapist.

Another theory about the mechanism of the counseling relationship is known as the secure-base hypothesis, which is related to attachment theory. This hypothesis proposes that the counselor acts as a secure base from where clients can explore and check in. Secure attachment to one's counselor and secure attachment in general have been found to be positively related to client exploration, while insecure attachment styles have been correlated with less session depth than secure attachment styles.

=== Cultural variables ===
Counseling psychologists are interested in how culture relates to help-seeking and counseling process and outcome. Standard surveys exploring the nature of counseling across cultures and various ethnic groups include Counseling Across Cultures by Paul B. Pedersen, Juris G. Draguns, Walter J. Lonner and Joseph E. Trimble, Handbook of Multicultural Counseling by Joseph G. Ponterotto, J. Manueal Casas, Lisa A. Suzuki and Charlene M. Alexander and Handbook of Culture, Therapy, and Healing by Uwe P. Gielen, Jefferson M. Fish and Juris G. Draguns. Janet E. Helms' racial identity model can be useful for understanding how the counseling relationship and counseling process might be affected by the client's and counselor's racial identities. Recent research suggests that clients who are Black are at risk for experiencing racial micro-aggression from counselors who are White.

Research in cultural adaptation in counseling allows for counselors to develop better sensitivity to other cultures. This developing research can help develop the model of counseling practice in a way that is applicable throughout the world. Cultures are each unique in the way they impact mental health and one's view on mental health, varying in language, what stories are told and how mental stress is perceived. It is important for counseling psychologists to be aware of how the unique experiences of marginalized individuals impact their lives.

The efficacy of treatment of clients who are lesbians, gay men, or bisexual might be related to therapist demographics, gender, sexual identity development, sexual orientation, and professional experience. Clients who are multiply oppressed might be especially likely to experience unhelpful situations with counselors, so counselors may require extra training before working with clients who are lesbian, gay, bisexual, or transgender people of color, and other clients from multiply oppressed populations.

Gender role socialization can also present issues for clients and counselors. Implications for practice include the need for counseling psychologists to be aware of stereotypes and biases about male and female identity, roles and behavior, such as emotional expression. The APA guidelines for multicultural competence outline expectations for counseling psychologists to take culture into account in practice and research.

=== Counseling ethics and regulation ===
Perceptions on ethical behavior by counseling psychologists vary depending upon geographical location, but ethical mandates are similar throughout the global community. Ethical standards are created to help practitioners, clients and the community avoid any possible harm or potential for harm, as well as to better protect and serve both client and counselor. The standard ethical behaviors are centered on "doing no harm" and preventing harm. Ethical codes often resemble the APA's Ethics Principles of Psychologists and Code of Conduct, which lists the ethical requirements expected of psychologists. The Code includes expectations for the psychologist such as respecting clients' rights, ensuring proper professional competence, ensuring the client's welfare, and requiring informed consent. Several states require counselors to follow the American Counseling Association's Code of Ethics which was revised and updated in 2014. Failure to follow this code can lead to license revocation or more severe consequences.

Generally, counselors must review with their clients verbally and in writing the responsibilities and rights that the counselor and client have. Counselors must share their techniques with the client, including the goals they have for the client and what to expect from the procedures that will be used in each session. The provider may discuss their qualifications and credentials in order to establish trust in the relationship and should address any concerns or misgivings a patient might share about their choice to seek counseling.

Counselors cannot share any confidential information that is obtained through the counseling process without specific written consent by the client or legal guardian, except to prevent clear, imminent danger to the client or others, or when required to do so by a court order. Insurance companies or government programs will also be notified of certain information about a patient's diagnosis and treatment to determine if care is covered. Those companies and government programs are bound by HIPAA in the United States and the GDPR in Europe to keep such information strictly confidential.

Counselors are held to a higher standard than most professionals because of the intimate nature of their delivery of therapeutic services. Counselors are not only to avoid fraternizing with their clients but should avoid any kind of dual relationship with a client and should never engage in a sexual relationship with a client. While explicitly personal relationships must be avoided, the counselor should strive to maintain a positive relationship that is mutually respectful, collaborative, and responsive to feedback in order for treatment to be successful. Counselors are also prohibited from counseling their friends and family members to ensure they can remain objective. They are also prohibited from engaging in online relationships, such as a relationship over social media, with clients.

The National Board for Certified Counselors states that counselors "shall discuss important considerations to avoid exploitation before entering into a non-counseling relationship with a former client. Important considerations to be discussed include amount of time since counseling service termination, duration of counseling, nature and circumstances of client's counseling, the likelihood that the client will want to resume counseling at some time in the future; circumstances of service termination and possible negative effects or outcomes."

Counselors are generally discouraged from accepting gifts, favors, or trade for therapy. In some communities, it may be possible to avoid accepting a gift given the community's economic environment, but the gift-giver may feel personally rejected. In some cases, if the gift is something small such as a cookie, or a small token gesture like a drawing from a child, it may be appropriate to accept the gift. Counselors must exercise judgment in these circumstances, but in most cases, it is possible to avoid accepting gifts, favors, and trade.

Counselors must pass examinations that assess their training and knowledge before being able to practice, such as the National Counselor Examination (NCE) administered by the National Board for Certified Counselors; the National Clinical Mental Health Counselor Examination (NCMHCE), also administered by the NBCE; the Certified Rehabilitation Counselor Examination (CRCE) administered by the Commission on Rehabilitation Counselor Certification, or the Examination for Professional Practice in Psychology (EPPP). The most common exam utilized for counselor licensure is the NCE.

== Training and supervision ==
=== Education and training ===
Counseling psychologists are trained in graduate programs, most of which take 5–6 years to complete. Almost all programs grant a PhD, but a few grant a Psy.D. or Ed.D. Graduate work in counseling psychology includes coursework in general psychology and statistics, counseling practice, and research. Students must complete an original dissertation at the end of their graduate training. Students must also complete a one-year full-time internship at an accredited site before earning their doctorate. In order to be licensed to practice, counseling psychologists must gain a set number of hours of clinical experience under supervision as well as pass a standardized exam.

In the United States, the pathway to becoming a counseling psychologist generally begins with obtaining a bachelor’s degree in psychology, sociology, anthropology, or another human services-related field from a four-year university. This is typically followed by graduate training at the master’s and/or doctoral level. While some individuals may enter counseling practice after completing a master’s degree as a Licensed Professional Counselor or a Licensed Clinical Social Worker, doctoral-level training is required for licensure as a counseling psychologist. In some programs, students may complete master’s and doctoral training concurrently. Within doctoral education, the distinction between degrees is important: a PsyD (Doctor of Psychology) emphasizes clinical practice, whereas a PhD (Doctor of Philosophy) places greater emphasis on research and clinical science. Enrollment in an accredited program is essential, particularly in the United States, where accreditation is overseen by the American Psychological Association (APA). Accreditation ensures that training programs meet established professional and scientific standards necessary for ethical, competent, and effective psychological practice.

=== Common competency requirements ===
Common competencies in counseling psychology practice involve a structured clinical process integrating assessment, diagnosis, formulation, and intervention. This includes conducting a clinical interview, performing a mental status examination (MSE), and using psychometric tools to assess symptom presence and severity, followed by case formulation and diagnosis, which informs the delivery of evidence-based psychological interventions, along with ongoing outcome monitoring to evaluate treatment effectiveness and client progress over time.

=== Training models and research ===
Counseling psychology includes the study and practice of counselor training and counselor supervision. As researchers, counseling psychologists may investigate what makes training and supervision effective. As practitioners, counseling psychologists may supervise and train a variety of clinicians. Counselor training tends to occur in formal classes and training programs. Part of counselor training may involve counseling clients under the supervision of a licensed clinician. Supervision can also occur between licensed clinicians, as a way to improve clinicians' quality of work and competence with various types of counseling clients.

As the field of counseling psychology formed in the mid-20th century, initial training models included Robert Carkuff's human relations training model, Norman Kagan's Interpersonal Process Recall, and Allen Ivey's microcounseling skills. Modern training models include Gerard Egan's skilled helper model, and Clara E. Hill's three-stage model (exploration, insight, and action). A recent analysis of studies on counselor training found that modeling, instruction, and feedback are common to most training models, and seem to have medium to large effects on trainees.

=== Supervision models and issues ===
Like the models of how clients and therapists interact, there are also models of the interactions between therapists and their supervisors. Edward S. Bordin proposed a model of supervision working alliance similar to his model of therapeutic working alliance. McNeill and Stoltenberg's Integrated Development Model considers the level of a trainee's motivation/anxiety, autonomy, and awareness of self and others. The Systems Approach to Supervision views the relationship between supervisor and supervised as the most important element of successful therapeutic training, in addition to the supervisor's personal characteristics, counseling clients, training setting, and the tasks and functions of supervision. The Critical Events in Supervision model focuses on important moments that occur between the supervisor and supervised.

Problems can arise in supervision and training. The amount of formal training a supervisor needs to be a competent supervisor is a commonly disputed issue. Recent research suggests that conflicting, multiple relationships can occur between supervisors and clients, such as that of the client, instructor, and clinical supervisor. The occurrence of racial micro-aggression against Black clients suggests potential problems with racial bias in supervision. In general, conflicts between a counselor and his or her own supervisor can arise when supervisors demonstrate disrespect, lack of support, and blame.

== Categories of counseling ==
=== Career counseling ===
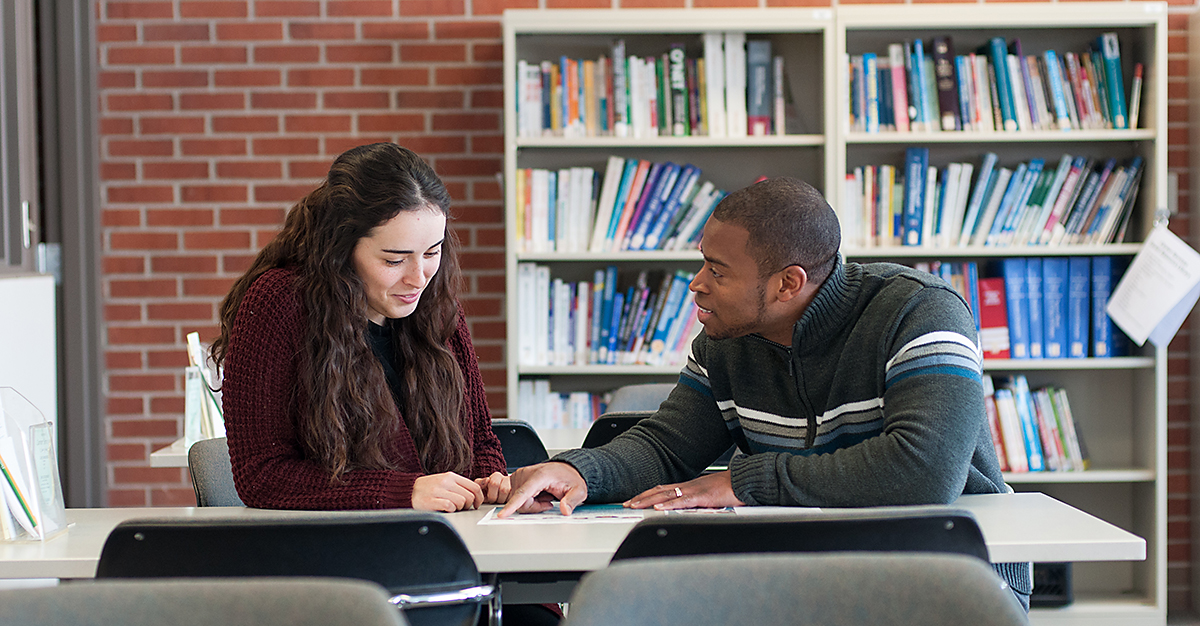

The goal of career counseling is to help provide guidance during all stages of a person's career trajectory. Career Counseling looks to help an individual understand themselves and the ongoing world around them so they may make an informed decision regarding their life and career. Career counselors provide a wide array of services, such as attempting to help individuals discover themselves and the actual goals or achievements they may want to complete in life regarding education, career, or their life in general. While also helping individuals figure out what they may want to become, career counselors also help find resources and information that may be of use to people in achieving their future goals. Career counselors may create a roadmap of sorts to help individuals visualize where they are along in their journey of achieving their dreams.

One factor that counselors deal with is people tend to think unemployment can be permanent; however, counselors must make sure that unemployment is only temporary and their status will eventually change. So counselors must do their best to give positive reinforcement to focus more on finding their path in life. Career counseling may include provision of occupational information, modeling skills, written exercises, and exploration of career goals and plans. Career counseling can also involve the use of personality or career interest assessments, such as the Myers-Briggs Type Indicator, which is based on Carl Jung's theory of psychological type, or the Strong Interest Inventory, which makes use of John L. Holland's career development model. An individual's skills, abilities, and values are also commonly assessed in career counseling. Career counselors have the flexibility to decide whether to conduct sessions using a group or individual setting, and whether to do so face-to-face or online. Currently, there is no internationally accepted standard to become a qualified career counselor; qualifications and certification will vary depending on local, state, and internal regulations.

=== Marriage and family counseling ===
The purpose of marriage and family counseling is to explore the relationships and interactions in the family and discuss the positive actions already taken, and how to change the negative actions in order to bring productive change to the family. Marriage and family counseling allows the family to discover how they can work together to make the household functional and find solutions, when necessary.

=== Rehabilitation counseling ===
The purpose of rehabilitation counseling is to work alongside people with disabilities in order to achieve their academic, career, or personal goals. In rehabilitation counseling, a counselor works closely with the client to develop personal, vocational, and independent living goals and come up with a plan to achieve those goals.

=== Clinical mental health counseling ===
Clinical mental health counseling is addressing a variety of issues such as addiction, family and relationship issues, abuse, and stress. Clinical mental health counseling provides guidance on how to handle and cope with these life struggles. They help make any adjustments in order to improve the quality of life for each client.

=== Educational counseling ===
The purpose of educational counseling is to work with students in elementary, junior high, and high school to discuss future education goals. For elementary and junior high, educational counselors are there to provide support and work alongside teachers and parents in order to avert negative actions and replace them with positive. In high school, an educational counselor is mainly there to help guide students to success after graduation.

== Professional journals ==
In the United States, the main scholarly journals of the profession are the Journal of Counseling Psychology and The Counseling Psychologist. The Journal of Counseling Psychology publishes “theoretical, empirical, and methodological articles on multicultural aspects of counseling.” It also focuses on assessment, intervention, consultations, educational requirements, and the treatment of special populations of clients such as unhoused clients, clients with developmental issues, and clients who may or may not be severely disturbed. The Journal of Counseling Psychology publishes research that focuses on emphasizing development and benefiting the well-being of people. The Counseling Psychologist is the official publication of the Society of Counseling Psychology and one of the first journals within the field. It publishes scholarly articles expanding the field of counseling psychology through debates and development of new areas, as well as new practices.

Publications of counseling psychology are different throughout the world. In Australia, counseling psychology articles are published in the counseling psychology section of the Australian Psychologist. In Europe, the scholarly journals of the profession include the European Journal of Counselling Psychology (under the auspices of the European Association of Counselling Psychology) and the Counselling Psychology Review (under the auspices of the British Psychological Society). Counselling Psychology Quarterly is an international interdisciplinary publication of Routledge (part of the Taylor & Francis Group).

== See also ==
- Clinical psychology
- Coaching psychology
- List of counseling topics
- Outline of psychology
- Professional practice of behavior analysis
