= Clinical mental health counseling =

Profession within the field of mental health

Clinical mental health counseling is a healthcare profession addressing issues such as substance abuse, addiction, relational problems, stress management, as well as more serious conditions such as suicidal ideation and acute behavioral disorders. Practitioners may also assist with occupational growth in neurodivergent populations and behavioral and educational development. Clinical mental health (CMH) counselors include psychologists, psychiatrists, mental health technicians, marriage counselors, social workers, and family therapists.

== Historical perspectives ==
=== Origins of counseling ===
In the early 1900s, counseling had not yet developed into treating mental health issues and was more focused on education. Frank Parsons, developed a plan to educate counselors and began the Vocational Guidance Movement. He was concerned with the problems of youth as youth unemployment became a major concern for adolescents as urbanization occurred, and sustainable work and family income generated on family farms was not as prevalent. At this time, counselors were considered vocational, initiating the approach that began to form the more contemporary counseling process. Around the same time, Clifford Beers, a former patient of mental health hospitals, wrote a book exposing the terrible conditions of mental health institutions and advocated for reform. Beers later founded the National Committee for Mental Hygiene, which became the National Mental Health Association. Jessie B. Davis was the first individual to make guidance a regular part of the school curriculum. He was a superintendent or administrator and advocated for what became school guidance and counseling.

During the Great Depression, counseling methods and strategies for employment grew as it was greatly needed at the time. In 1932, Brewer wrote a book entitled Education as Guidance, which promoted the broadening of counseling beyond just occupation. He suggested that every teacher share the implementation of counseling and that guidance needed to be in every school curriculum. In the 1940s, Carl Rogers began the development of counseling and psychotherapy. He believed that the client knows best and that only they could explain what their needs are and what direction to go in counseling based on what problems were crucial and needed attention. Rogers clearly indicated that he was not doing psychology and the courses he taught were based in the Department of Education.

World War II brought to the forefront the importance of testing and placement as there was a strong need for the selection and training of specialists for the military. Counselors and Psychologists had the necessary skills to fill this much needed role. The Veterans Administration provided professional counseling services to soldiers after their discharge and in 1945, the VA granted stipends and internships for students in counseling and psychology, boosting the support and training available to counselors. This time marked the beginning of government spending on counselor preparation as we know it today. Clinical psychologists were trained to treat and diagnose individuals with chronic disorders, and counseling psychologists were trained to deal with issues presented by people with more severe mental health issues. This led to a new division or category of psychologists and the Division of Counseling and Guidance of the American Psychological Association changed its title to the Division of Counseling Psychology.

=== Professionalization of mental health counseling ===
In the 1950s, flaws in the existing mental health system were being exposed and clinically effective pharmacological treatments were also being developed that could be provided in outpatient settings. This led to a need for community-based clinics, but access to these services was limited. The Community Mental Health Act of 1963 was very important in the development of the counseling profession. After the government analyzed the problems with mental illness and effective treatments, President John F. Kennedy believed that high-quality treatment centers located in the patient's community could lead to the phasing out of state mental hospitals and drastically improve the mental health system in the United States. The national network of community mental health centers created a demand for counselors and the profession began to expand and increase the number of counselors.

As the counseling profession grew, there became a need to regulate the quality of services being provided by professionals via state licensure. In 1974, a special committee was appointed by the American Personnel and Guidance Association that focused on counselor licensure. This began the steps towards the first counselor licensure law in Virginia in 1976. By the 1980s, mental health counseling had clearly established itself as a profession with a distinct set of regulations and methods for providing services. According to Gerig, a distinct professional is characterized by "role statements, codes of ethics, accreditation guidelines, competency standards, licensure, certification, and other standards of excellence." The counseling profession as we know it today has established all of these facets of a distinct profession and is being recognized more and more as a valuable and much-needed helping profession in our society.

== Education, licensure, and certification ==
=== Licensure ===
Counselor licensure is established by state law and is required of all professional counselors in the United States and U.S. territories. Receiving a license in counseling indicates that one has met the minimum standards to practice counseling in that state. State laws vary in the requirements that must be met to obtain a license. Candidates must have at least received a master's degree, have had post-master's supervised practice, and have passed a national exam.

The number of credit hours to be completed varies from one state to another, as does the number of supervised hours that must be completed, and the counselor titles used. Moving from one state to another may require taking additional courses in order to qualify for the license in the other state.

==== Common education requirements ====
In order to become licensed as a Licensed Professional Counselor (LPC) or Licensed Professional Counselor Associate (LPCS), students need to study for many hours in different fields of mental health, general psychology, and others. These usually include:

- Internship Experience for Certification
- Orientation to the Counseling Profession
- Research
- Career, Vocational, and Lifestyle Development
- Human growth and Development
- Social and Cultural Foundations
- Counseling Theories and Techniques
- Appraisal from peers
- Group Work
- Practicum and Internship

==== Examination requirements ====
The LPC applicant must obtain a passing score on a national exam, such as the National Counselor Exam (NCE), the National Clinical Mental Health Counseling Exam (NCMHCE), or the Certified Rehabilitation Counselor Exam (CRC). The first two exams are offered by the National Board for Certified Counselors (NBCC) and the third exam is offered by the Commission on Rehabilitation Counselor Certification (CRCC). In addition to the national exam, applicants must complete a no-fail Jurisprudence Exam, which covers information on laws and ethical codes.

==== Supervision requirements ====
Applicants must have completed over 3,000 hours of supervised counseling practice. Supervisees should receive one hour of live supervision per forty hours of practice. 2,000 or more hours must involve direct client contact.

=== Certification ===
Certification is a voluntary credential that can be acquired by counselors as well. According to Remley and Herlihy, there are two national certification agencies for the counseling profession. These are the National Board for Certified Counselors (NBCC) and the Commission on Rehabilitation Counselor Certification (CRCC). The NBCC also offers specialty certifications. The information regarding the certifications provided by the NBCC is outlined below.

==== National Certified Counselor (NCC) ====
According to Remley and Herlihy, this certification is granted by the National Board for Certified Counselors (NBCC) after an individual has met certain requirements. These include:

- Completion of a master's degree in counseling
- Completion of two years post-master's experience
- If an individual graduates from a program that is accredited by the Council for the Accreditation of Counseling and Related Educational Programs (CACREP), the two years of post-master's experience requirement is waived.
- Acquisition of a passing grade on the National Counselor Exam (NCE)

==== Certified Clinical Mental Health Counselor (CCMHC) ====
According to Gerig, counselors seeking the CCMHC specialty credential must meet the following requirements:

- Obtain the National Certified Counselor (NCC) certification
- Complete 60 hours of graduate coursework including courses in:
1. Theories of Counseling
2. Psychotherapy
3. Personality
4. Abnormal Psychology and Psychopathology
5. Human Growth and Development
6. Professional Orientation and Ethics
7. Research
8. Testing
9. Social/Cultural Foundations
- Complete an academic program with 9–15 hours of clinical training in a supervised practicum/internship in a mental health counseling setting
- Acquire a passing score on the National Clinical Mental Health Counseling Exam (NCMHCE)
- Submit an audiotape or videotape of a counseling session

==== Master Addictions Counselor ====
According to Gerig, the Master Addictions Counselor (MAC) specialty certification is intended for counselors treating substance abuse and dependence. Counselors seeking this credential must complete the following requirements:

- Obtain a National Certified Counselor (NCC) certification
- Document at least 12 semester hours of graduate work in addictions or 500 hours of continuing education units
- Complete 3 years of supervised experience as an addiction counselor
- Obtain a passing score on the Examination for Master Addiction Counselors (EMAC)

== Professional organizations ==
Professional organizations exist to serve many different functions. They provide an assembly for professionals to gather to discuss issues and problems that exist within the profession. Organizations allow the members of a profession to address issues as a group rather than facing these issues independently. Professional organizations provide an outlet for legislative activity and leadership regarding particular issues that affect the profession at all levels. Continuing education is a critical requirement for members of a profession as it ensures that all professionals' skills and expertise are continuously updated to reflect the most current research and recommendations; professional organizations provide this continuing education to their members. These organizations also assist in keeping professionals up to date by providing scholarly journals, books, and media resources to their members. Lastly, professional organizations publish and enforce a code of ethics for their members.

The following professional organizations are the primary ones available to those within the clinical mental health counseling profession.

=== American Counseling Association (ACA) ===
American Counseling Association is "a not-for-profit, professional and educational organization that is dedicated to the growth and enhancement of the counseling profession". Headquartered in Alexandria, VA, with 56 chartered branches in the United States, Europe, and Latin America, it was founded in 1952 and is noted to be the world's largest association that exclusively represents professional counselors in a variety of practice settings. ACA is divided into 20 divisions that are tailored to specialized areas and/or principles of counseling. ACA has membership available for all stages of the counseling profession from students to retirees. In addition to the professional and advocacy benefits, ACA also offers its members discounts on malpractice liability, auto, home, and personal insurance products, prescription, lab, and imaging services, and discounts from industry leaders in hotel, travel, credit cards, as well many other consumer services. Members can choose to additionally join one or more of the 20 divisions, which offer their own unique professional benefits.

==== American Mental Health Counselors Association (AMHCA) ====
American Mental Health Counselors Association is an independent nonprofit 501(c)6 professional membership association made up of more than 7,000 clinical mental health counselors. Its mission is "to enhance the profession of clinical mental health counseling through licensing, advocacy, education, and professional development". The American Mental Health Counselors Association (AMHCA) is an independent non-profit, membership-owned, and operated association.

The vision of AMHCA is to position clinical mental health counselors to meet the health care needs of those we serve while advancing the profession.

The mission of AMHCA is to advance the profession of clinical mental health counseling by setting the standard for collaboration, advocacy, research, ethical practice, and education/training/professional development.

AMHCA association bylaws are the rules and regulations enacted by the association to provide a framework for its operation and management. The bylaws define elections, titles, terms of office, and responsibilities of the AMHCA officers of the association, as well as certain responsibilities of the chief executive officer. The bylaws also specify the qualifications, rights, and liabilities of membership, and the powers, duties, and responsibilities of state chapters and affiliate associations/organizations as well as grounds for dissolution of a chapter, the removal of an officer of the AMHCA, or the revocation of a membership. Standing committees are also identified as are certain fiduciary processes, obligations, and limitations. Clinical mental health counselors at all stages of their professional journey, including students, are eligible to join AMHCA. Member benefits also include professional liability insurance plan discounts, continuing education opportunities, networking via AMHCA's annual conference, and a quarterly journal with the latest clinical mental health counseling research.

=== National Board for Certified Counselors (NBCC) ===
National Board for Certified Counselors is a not-for-profit, independent certification organization that was established in 1982. Its primary purposes are "to establish and monitor a national certification system, to identify those counselors who have voluntarily sought and obtained certification, and to maintain a register of those counselors". NBCC has four voluntary certifications, the National Certified Counselor (NCC), Certified Clinical Mental Health Counselor (CCMHC), National Certified School Counselor (NCSC), and Master Addictions Counselor (MAC). The NCC and MAC are both accredited by the National Commission for Certifying Agencies (NCCA). Obtaining National Counselor Certification (NCC) through NBCC, though not required, has many professional benefits including showing the public and employers that you have voluntarily met high national standards for the practice of counseling. Additionally, NCCs receive a number of other benefits including access to low-cost liability insurance, the ability to market oneself using the certification, a free six-month listing in the Therapy Directory, and continuing education credit, among others. The fees paid for certification go towards supporting NBCC's advocacy efforts for the counseling profession.

== Working environments ==
=== Community Mental Health Agency ===
This type of counseling setting generally provides a wide array of services, especially depending on particular populations served, as well as geographical settings. Services may include, but are not limited to: individual, family, and group of outpatient talk therapy; twenty-four-hour crisis intervention, or mobile crisis management; rape, sexual abuse, and domestic violence services; testing and assessment for career interests, and broader mental health issues; community psycho-education and outreach; day treatment (for mentally ill and/or developmentally disabled); intensive in-home treatment; jail diversion programs; and case management.

=== Private practice ===
Although private practices are common in the American mental health counseling community, a licensed counselor often enters this kind of setting after several professional years have passed and following the completion of a master's degree program. Before making the transition into the private setting, many therapists work for a larger community-based agency, hospital, or treatment facility. The advantages include independence in providing therapy; the ability to be more selective when it comes to the clientele and population(s) served; and incorporating unique skills and special training, such as play therapy, EMDR (Eye Movement Desensitization and Reprocessing), etc. However, the act of operating a private practice is akin to running a small business. In order to prosper, it is crucial for the counselor to have proper business and public representation skills. In deciding to hang a shingle, one must be prepared to establish and maintain a respectable presence in his or her community, oftentimes promoting awareness (and thus one's business) on one's own time. Awareness activities include visiting places of worship, community centers, local businesses, etc. to perform psycho-educational workshops. As described in the previous section of Community Mental Health Agencies, the same standards of insurance coverage, as well as sliding scale payment, apply to private practice settings. A big difference is that independent counselors are often responsible for processing their own billing if they do not have an administrative assistant.

=== Alcohol and substance abuse treatment programs (residential and outpatient) ===
In this mental health setting, there are many commonalities shared with the more overarching community agencies. Both environments encompass similar services, such as individual, family, and group outpatient counseling; twenty-four-hour crisis intervention; day treatment for mentally ill and/or developmentally disabled clients; and case management. Although alcohol/substance abuse programs have an obvious focus on recovery and rehabilitation, counseling services also apply to assisting in comorbidity, or dual diagnoses (e.g., bipolar disorder and alcohol dependence). Recovery programs provide specialized group counseling sessions for clients dealing with comorbidity, for gender-specific clientele, and for clients receiving methadone treatment. Clients may enter treatment through self- or family referrals. The majority of clients are ordered to participate in a recovery program by a judge in Drug Court, on account of criminal charges pertaining to drunk driving, possession of illegal substances, etc. The majority of clients receive funding through Medicaid or the state, but private insurance can also be accepted. Both outpatient and residential services last an average of thirty to ninety days. Due to this brief span of time for treatment, counselors strongly encourage their clients struggling with addiction(s) to become regular attendees of local AA and/or NA meetings, and to obtain a sponsor as soon as possible.

=== University and college counseling centers ===
This counseling setting is typically based within a wellness or health center of a school on campus. Ordinarily, there are an average of eight to ten free sessions allocated to every student for each academic year, with each session lasting roughly one hour. It is not uncommon for a client's appointments to occur once every two to three weeks, as the counseling staff serve hundreds to even thousands of students per semester. That being said, therapists in this type of employment setting treat a variety of mental health concerns.

The clientele are principally both traditional young adults, and adult students. College and university counseling staff assist students within a broad scope of subject matter, "such as depression, anxiety, self-mutilation, eating disorders, post-traumatic disorders, and self-esteem issues". The strictly designated number of sessions for each student is designed to make the therapy process temporary and brief. However, if a client reveals a more severe mental disorder, the staff are responsible for referring the individual to specialized services in the community.

== Theoretical orientations to counseling ==
Counseling theories are interrelated principles that describe, explain, predict, and guide the actions of the counselors within different situations. The use of theory provides a tool for counselors to use in order to identify important aspects of and clearly organize a client's story or narrative. These integrated systems are evaluated by multiple criteria: precision and clarity, comprehensiveness, testability, utility, and heuristic value. Counseling theories can be classified into four distinct categories: analytic, humanistic-existential, action-based, and postmodern/multicultural approaches.

=== Analytic approaches ===
1. Psychodynamic theory, or psychodynamics, involves personality and how it can be analyzed in order to more fully understand the client's presenting problem and quality of life. Both psychoanalytic and psychodynamic approaches to counseling include analyzing or conceptualizing personality, developing and fostering insight on behalf of the client, and then using those insights to create interventions or take action.
2. Jungian analytic theory is based on the idea of a collective unconscious, which is a storing of history, stories, fairy tales, and other experiences that make up the psyche which, in turn, can be used in therapy for psychological healing. The ultimate goal of counselors who utilize this theory is to combine the conscious and unconscious aspects of the self in order to foster a connection with the universe that is whole and complete. See also Analytical psychology.
3. Adlerian individual psychology is used by counselors who believe that each individual develops their own style of life, which helps to make sense of the world around them. Adlerian counselors direct their clients to choose a new lifestyle when the old is faulty or no longer serves its purpose for the client. This approach is brief and directive, with the aim of helping clients develop insight and self-understanding.

=== Humanistic-existential approaches ===
1. Person centered is an influential theory in counseling. The founder of this theory, Carl Rogers, stated that three conditions are necessary for therapeutic change to occur: a) congruence or genuineness, b) accurate empathy, and c) unconditional positive regard. Many counselors consider therapeutic presence to be a necessary condition, as the goal of person centered therapy is to allow clients to become more fully themselves and experience this through the counseling relationship.
2. Existential theory focuses on the meaning of life, identity crises, confronting lonesomeness, and other anxieties involving "big picture" ideas. Counselors who utilize existential therapy focus on existential roots and emphasize the idea that human beings are ultimately responsible for the choices they make and the actions they take.
3. Gestalt theory involves helping clients become aware of their true selves. This includes present moment awareness of self and environment. Gestalt therapy techniques include active and experiential methods and the main goal of this approach to counseling is a reintegration of the self, including parts that have been metaphorically cutoff.

=== Action-based approaches ===
1. Behavioral approaches to counseling include techniques such as classical conditioning, operant conditioning, and social learning theory. Behavior therapy oriented counselors tend to conduct their interventions on behaviors that are both observable and measurable.
2. Cognitive-behavioral theory combines both cognitive and behavioral approaches to counseling. In addition to cognitive behavioral therapy, there are numerous other forms of this approach including Multimodal therapy, Rational Emotive Behavior Therapy, Reality therapy, and Mindfulness-based cognitive therapy.
3. Systemic/family approaches to counseling focus on the importance of the larger relational system, such as the family of origin, family of procreation, and other societal groups and communities. Counselors who utilize this theory view client's presenting problems as related to the systems that they are involved in and view symptoms with neutrality in order to help clients create new relational patterns within family therapy and systemic therapy.

=== Postmodern and multicultural approaches ===
1. Solution based counseling theory is related to systemic family counseling and involves encouraging clients to make small consistent changes in their lives. Solution based theory views the counselor and clients are collaborators in order to create goals and bring about measurable change. This type of theory involves solution focused brief therapy and it is utilized in schools, and managed care environments, among other time-limited environments.
2. Feminist theory is often misinterpretation as being used by counselors who work only with female clients. However, this theory focuses on multiple aspects of identity, such as gender, culture, race, sexual orientation, to name a few. Feminist theory counselors hold the belief that human beings seek connections with others in order to establish growth. This theoretical orientation labels disconnection as the root of the client's presenting problems and the ultimate goal of feminist therapy is to create growth-fostering relationships.
3. Narrative theory involves the idea that each individual operates from a dominant discourse, which is the societal expectations by which human beings live. The purpose of narrative therapy is to focus on separating the person from the problem and guiding clients to choose alternative ways to act and interact with others throughout their daily lives.
4. Collaborative theory is an approach that involves counselor and clients working together to explore and create an understanding of the presenting problems. Counselors with this theoretical orientation use the collaborative therapy technique of mutual puzzling, which is shared inquiry of discovering how the problem occurs and also how to move forward.
5. Reflecting teams are not so much a theory as they are a technique utilized by postmodern counselors. Guidelines for reflecting teams are as follows: client must give permission, client can choose to listen or not to listen to the teams' conversation, conversation should focus on what is seen or heard, conversation should stem from a questioning, speculative perspective, the reflecting team should not address the client or clients directly, and the reflecting team should listen for what is appropriately unusual.

== Ethics in counseling ==
A code of ethics contains standards of behavior or practice that are agreed upon as acceptable by professionals within a given field. There are multiple ethical codes within the field of counseling that counselors are expected to abide by within their work and professional role. These codes are then enforced by ethics committees and licensure boards. A violation of code may lead to a number of consequences, dependent upon the severity of the violation, and varying in such: one might be placed on probation, suspended, or even have their license revoked.

While law clarifies a profession's scope of practice, ethics are important to each profession for a number of reasons. Not only do codes of ethics provide standards to which members of the profession are held accountable, but they also aid in the improvement of provided services. Ethical codes promote professionalism and provide evidence of the intent of members within a profession to regulate and moderate their behavior. They assist in identifying appropriate courses of action for situations that arise without clear and easy resolution. Also, while ethical codes cannot be entirely preventative, they protect consumers from dangerous and/or inappropriate practice. Different professional organizations within each field may have their own personal code of ethics as well, such as the American Counseling Association and the American Mental Health Counselors Association in the profession of counseling.

It has been concluded that ethics encompasses five different features: possessing adequate knowledge, skills, and judgment to produce effective interventions; respecting the dignity, freedom, and rights of the client; using power inherent in the counselor's role judiciously and responsibly; conducting oneself in such a way that promotes the public's confidence in the profession; maintaining the client's welfare as the highest priority of the mental health professional.

Similarly, six different principle ethics are often considered as crucial to take into account when faced with an ethical decision: the principle of autonomy, which relates to the client's right to control their own life, decisions, future, etc.; non-maleficence, which translates to doing no harm to the client; somewhat oppositely, beneficence, which means doing good for or promoting the welfare of your client; justice, referring to fairness and equality on the part of the professional; fidelity, which requires the professional to fulfill a responsibility of faithfulness and trust; and veracity, which means being truthful and honest with clients.

The newest 2014 edition of the American Counseling Association's Code of Ethics contains nine sections that each address a separate area of ethical conduct: the counseling relationship; confidentiality and privacy; professional responsibility; relationships with other professionals; evaluation, assessment, and interpretation; supervision, training, and teaching; research and publication; distance counseling, technology, and social media; and resolving ethical issues. A brief description of some of these predominant realms follows.

=== Confidentiality ===
Confidentiality refers to the respect of a client's privacy. Almost all information that a client reveals during counseling is protected, unless the client intends to cause harm to themselves or others. The client's consent is almost always required for the reveal of information to a third party. Laws of privileged communication within applicable states also further protect the privacy of clients. Where privileged communication is present, confidential information does not need to be disclosed in court without the client's permission. Confidentiality is crucial to create the safety, trust, and honesty required in an effective, beneficial counseling relationship.

Outside of privileged communication, there are generally four instances in which confidential information may be released to a third party: if the client allows the counselor to do so with a signed release of information if the client discloses or is suspected to be an imminent threat of safety or danger to self or others, if current abuse or the intent of abuse of another is disclosed, or if a court order or subpoena requires the release of client records or testimony of the counselor.

=== Competence ===
This concept of competence requires proof of minimum competency for a professional, while also striving to practice in an ideal manner. For each credential that a counselor earns, such as a degree and licensure, there are minimum prerequisites of performance that must be met. A counselor may also be competent or incompetent in different types of counseling, working with different populations, or specializing in different theoretical orientations. Competency also needs to be maintained over time and should be self-monitored. Counselors should continue to access and review current research, and continuing education credits can be earned through workshops, seminars, webinars, etc. When this ethical concept is not maintained, a counselor may be risking professional misconduct, and may even face trial for malpractice.

=== Informed consent ===
Informed consent is typically addressed through a form at the beginning of a counseling relationship and pertains to the client's right to be aware of the nature of that relationship and the counseling process itself. Informed consent should be present throughout the entire period that a client is receiving services. This information should be presented both in written form and discussed verbally with the client. A professional disclosure statement is typically provided to the client, which should include but is not limited to counselor credentials, issues of confidentiality, the use of tests and inventories, diagnosis, reports, billing, and therapeutic process.

=== Professional boundaries ===
There are multiple boundaries that could be crossed between a client and a counselor, including physical, psychological, emotional, and social boundaries. Some of these boundary lines may be blurry. For example, there are differing opinions on whether touch is ever appropriate between a counselor and their client. Sexual intercourse, however, is generally uniformly disagreed upon. Dual relationships, where a counselor holds two or more different roles within a client's life at the same time, are also typically avoided, as well as the acceptance of gifts of significant monetary value.

== Then and now ==
Many Community Mental Health (CMH) specialists operate under the holistic philosophy that in order to reach optimal health and wellness mental health professionals must look not only at the individual but also at the interacting communities and environment that surrounds that individual. The principal philosophy is no longer removing the disordered person from a normal family, social and community settings into a sheltered institutionalized environment but rather to a community-based treatment center for support and rehabilitation.

Important dates and figures such as Dorothea Dix in 1843 and the National Mental Health Act of 1946 brought attention to the living situations of the mentally ill and the need for financial funding and more appropriate programs. In 1963 the Community Mental Health Act provided federal funding for CMH services. Thanks to the development of available economic resources, a supply of mental health professionals and multidisciplinary team approaches to mental health has been deinstitutionalized.

CMH is now in the era of post deinstitutionalization. The rates of psychiatric patients treated in inpatient facilities have declined and the shift has turned to more cost-effective alternatives. New techniques and models are used to provide care for people that formerly would have been sent to inpatient treatment.

=== Least restrictive treatment environment ===
The idea behind the least restrictive treatment environment is to match the treatment's intensity with the severity of the client's condition so that restrictions to client personal freedom are minimal. This has been achieved by decreasing the clients' average lengths of stay in hospitals and emphasizing stabilization instead of intense therapy. Once stabilized, clients are released to the care of community-based agencies and practitioners for outpatient treatment plans. However, a revolving-door phenomenon occurs when patients are admitted, stabilized, released and then readmitted many times over a short period. Strong communication networks between mental health providers and the hospital must be utilized to help with the revolving–door phenomenon.

=== Case management models ===
Case management models help clients coordinate their schedules while integrating various community services. One of the most comprehensive case management model approaches is the Assertive community treatment approach.

==== Assertive community treatment ====
In the ACT approach, a team of professional counselors, social workers, nurses, rehabilitators and psychiatrists provide comprehensive, community-based treatment and support to clients. The team's caseload is small, and the responsibility is shared among team members. Services may include medication delivery, rehabilitation, and behavioral training in basic adaptive living skills, problems of nonattendance and transportation needs. It also includes 24-hour emergency services, medication management, money management, and assistance with daily living.

=== The recovery and consumer movement ===
This is the belief that mental health consumers should be able to develop control of treatment and end oppressive stigmas. Results of this movement include consumer-developed systems of care, self-help groups, consumer advocacy organizations and the recovery perspective.

Support groups like Alcoholics Anonymous (AA) have increased from around 50 in 1942 to well over 58,000 in 2012. Parents without Partners (PWP) started in 1957 with one group of two women and is now the world's largest nonprofit membership organization. Formed in 1976, the National Self-Help Clearinghouse now communicates information about the activities of more than 500,000 self-help groups that now exist in the United States.

The National Alliance on Mental Illness (NAMI) is a self-help support group and advocacy organization that consists of over 1,000 local affiliates and 50 state organizations. NAMI advocates for increased funding for research, housing, jobs, rehabilitation, and suitable health insurance.

The rise of the recovery perspective in community mental health is changing the underlying philosophy of what it means to be mentally ill. The U.S. government's Substance Abuse and Mental Health Services Administration (SAMHSA) defines recovery as "a journey of healing and transformation enabling a person with a mental health problem to live a meaningful life in a community of his or her choice with striving to achieve his or her full potential." The ten fundamental components of recover philosophy are: 1) Self-Direction, 2) Person-Centered, 3) Empowerment, 4) Holistic, 5) Non-linear, 6) Strength-based, 7) Peer Support, 8) Respect, 9) Responsibility, and 10) Hope.

Under the recovery consumers of mental health care are viewed as capable and responsible persons who can take charge and manage his or her condition. Wellness strategies are implemented in recovery work such as journaling, visiting friends, exercising, nutritious eating, praying, meditation, doing acts of kindness, and practicing gratitude. Consumers in recovery that offer service to their peers in mental health treatment are called Peer support specialist. They often help connect consumers with mental help professionals and are usually trained to counsel.

=== Evidence based treatment ===
Many health professionals argue that counseling is as much art as it is science. Evidence-based practices or treatments are often mandated in professional settings, even though some people find science-based outcome studies less helpful than practice-based evidence. This is because professional organizations, third-party reimbursers, and consumers want more attention given to quality control and accountability.

Evidence-based treatment is typically a study in which a particular treatment produces change, which is evident in randomized controlled trials, in comparison with another approach or no treatment at all. SAMHSA has developed the National Registry of Evidence-based Programs and Practices. This database provides summaries, target populations, target age demographics, types of outcomes achieved, costs, and expert ratings. More broadly, evidence-based treatment involves integrating the best available research evidence with clinical expertise and client characteristics to ensure treatment is effective.
