= Licensed professional counselor associate =

A licensed professional counselor associate (LPCA) is a provisionally licensed professional counselor who has completed a master’s level counseling program, passed necessary national examinations, and is currently working toward full licensure by completing a designated amount of supervised clinical counseling hours. Other common titles for this provisional license are licensed associate counselor (LAC), licensed associate professional counselor (LAPC), limited license professional counselor (LLPC), and licensed professional counselor – intern (LPC-I). Titles vary by state.

== Tiered Licensure ==
Several states in the US have implemented a tiered licensure system for professional counselors. These systems are either two or three tiers and provide both professional development and mentorship for new counselors, as well as added assurance for clients that they are receiving the best care possible. In two-tier systems, an LPC Associate is licensed to practice under the supervision of a fully licensed professional counselor (LPC) with a sufficient amount of post-graduate counseling experience. Once the LPC Associate has accrued the required number of hours (usually accomplished in about two years, depending on state regulations), they may apply to be an LPC and practice independently. In a three-tier system, in addition to an LPCA and LPC, there is a separate level of licensure for supervisors (Licensed Professional Counselor Supervisor (LPCS), or equivalent title) that requires additional coursework, training, and years of experience. In this type of system, only an LPCS may supervise an LPCA.

== Educational Requirements ==
For all programs accredited by the Council for Accreditation of Counseling and Related Educational Programs (CACREP), clinical mental health concentrations beginning after July 1, 2013 must require a minimum of 60 credit hours. These 60 credit hours must include a core curriculum of 8 classes: Professional Identity, Social and Cultural Diversity, Human Growth and Development, Career Development, Helping Relationships, Group Work, Assessment, and Research and Program Evaluation. There are additional elective requirements based on one’s specialty or concentration. CACREP also has strict requirements regarding faculty qualifications, faculty student ratios, learning environment, evaluation and administration practices, and ethical standards, among other things. In addition to academic course work, CACREP requires 100 hours of practicum experience (including 40 direct client hours) as well as 600 hours of internship experience (including at least 240 direct client hours).

== Exams ==
The most commonly required licensure exams to become a licensed professional counselor associate are the National Counselor Exam (NCE) or National Clinical Mental Health Counselor Exam (NCMHCE), though requirements vary from state to state.

== See also ==
- Clinical mental health counseling
