= Stephanie Moulton Sarkis =

American writer

- Born: Stephanie Moulton
- Education: PhD
- Alma mater: University of Florida
- Occupation: Self-help author
- Writing career
- Subject: Attention deficit hyperactivity disorder self-help books
- Website: www.stephaniesarkis.com

Stephanie Moulton Sarkis is an author who has written six self-help books.

== Self-help books ==
Sarkis is the author of the following books:

- Sarkis, Stephanie Moulton (2008-07-02). Making the Grade with ADD: A Student's Guide to Succeeding in College with Attention Deficit Disorder. New Harbinger Publications. ISBN 978-1572245549. OCLC 3902049338.
- Sarkis, Stephanie Moulton (2009-12-02). ADD and Your Money: A Guide to Personal Finance for Adults with Attention Deficit Disorder. New Harbinger Publications. ISBN 978-1572247079. OCLC 322469398.
- Sarkis, Stephanie Moulton (2011-03-01). Adult ADD : A Guide for the Newly Diagnosed. New Harbinger Publications. ISBN 978-1608820054. OCLC 656937916.
- Sarkis, Stephanie Moulton (2011-11-01). 10 Simple Solutions to Adult ADD: How to Overcome Chronic Distraction & Accomplish Your Goals. New Harbinger Publications. ISBN 978-1608821846. OCLC 3902049338.
- Sarkis, Stephanie Moulton (2015-07-01). Natural Relief for Adult ADHD: Complementary Strategies for Increasing Focus, Attention, and Motivation With or Without Medication. New Harbinger Publications. ISBN 978-1626251649. OCLC 2486760004.
- Sarkis, Stephanie Moulton (2017-12-01). Executive Function Difficulties in Adults: 100 Ways to Help Your Clients Live Productive and Happy Lives. PESI Publishing and Media. ISBN 978-1683730989. OCLC 5367820129.
- Sarkis, Stephanie Moulton (2018-10-01). Gaslighting: Recognize Manipulative and Emotionally Abusive People and Break Free. Da Capo Press, an imprint of Hachette Book Group. ISBN 978-0738284668. OCLC 5214974857.

== Biography ==
Stephanie Moulton Sarkis is a self-help author.

She has blog articles posted in Psychology Today, Forbes and Huffington Post. She writes about autism spectrum disorder and anxiety disorders, and their impact on college performance and personal finance. . Sarkis' experience with having ADHD herself is profiled in the book The Gift of Adult ADD by Lara Honos-Webb. Along with blog articles, Sarkis has published multiple books with topics ranging across different areas of psychology.

In graduate school, Sarkis was a co-recipient of an American Psychological Association Outstanding Dissertation Award; the study was subsequently published in the Journal of Attention Disorders. In 2002, she received a PhD in mental health counseling from the University of Florida, and is an American Mental Health Counselors Association Diplomate and Clinical Specialist in Child and Adolescent Counseling. Her professional qualifications include Licensed Mental Health Counselor and National Certified Counselor.
