= Laci Green =

American YouTuber

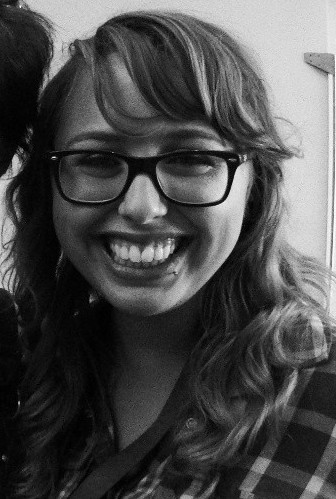
- Laci Green at 2014 VidCon
- Born: Valacia Nusheen Cyrus; October 18, 1989 (age 37); Salt Lake City, Utah, U.S.
- Education: Sierra College; University of California, Berkeley (BA); Wake Forest University (MA)
- Occupations: YouTuber; sex educator; mental health counselor

Instagram information
- Page: lacigreen
- Followers: 37.9 thousand

YouTube information
- Channel: lacigreen
- Years active: 2008–2021
- Genres: Sex education; vlog
- Subscribers: 1.31 million
- Views: 140 million
- Last updated: November 16, 2025
- Website: lacigreen.tv

Valacia Nusheen Cyrus (born October 18, 1989), better known as Laci Green, (/ˈleɪsi/ LAY-see) is an American clinical mental health counselor and former YouTuber. Her content focuses on sex education; Green also hosted Braless, the first MTV YouTube channel, as part of a 12-week deal with MTV. The first episode aired November 4, 2014. In 2016, Time named her one of the 30 most influential people on the Internet.

== Early life and education ==
Green was born in Salt Lake City, Utah. Her mother is a Mormon from a small American town, and her father, from a Shia Muslim family, is from Iran. Her father converted to the Church of Jesus Christ of Latter Day Saints. When she was two years old, her family moved to Portland, Oregon, and when she was twelve, they moved to California for her father's job. As she grew older she began to question the Mormon faith because of its strict gender roles and expectations of her as a woman. Growing up, Green was interested in theater and was supported by her mother, who owns a theater company.

Green initially attended Sierra College and then transferred to the University of California, Berkeley. In 2011, Green graduated with a bachelor's degree from the University of California, Berkeley in legal studies and education.

In 2021, Green moved to North Carolina to pursue a career as a clinical mental health counselor. Green graduated from Wake Forest University with a master's degree in counseling in 2024.

== Career ==
=== YouTube and sex education career ===
Green's videos were originally a hobby, but as they grew more popular, she took greater interest in sex education. As of October 2014, her YouTube channel had more than 1,000,000 subscribers. As a sex educator, she has given lectures at several universities and on behalf of Planned Parenthood. Green is a former co-host of DNews, (now known as “Seeker”) a YouTube channel with short science-based shows, launched by the Discovery News website. On January 18, 2013, Green appeared on Dr. Phil in an episode titled "Girls Who Bash Girls Who Dress Sexy". She spoke about how slut-shaming is wrong and how it is used to degrade a woman's sexuality.

Green advances the sex-positive movement in her videos and lectures. She has said that she wants to "get people to talk about sex in a way that isn't shameful, awkward, or weird. People are uneducated and this creates so many stigmas that don't need to be there."

After fellow YouTuber Sam Pepper posted a video of himself grabbing women's bottoms, Green wrote an open letter, co-signed by several other YouTube bloggers, asking Pepper to "stop violating women". Channel 4 and the BBC interviewed her about sexual harassment in the YouTube community.

In 2012, Green allegedly received death threats via the Internet for using the term "tranny" in a video in 2009; she apologized and took the video down, saying that the comment had been made years earlier when she had been very uneducated. After a month-long break, she returned to her YouTube channel in August 2012.

Green won a 2016 Streamy Award for Science or Education.

In May 2017, Green had a series of dialogs on Twitter, in her own videos, and in the videos of other YouTubers, with critics of identity politics, gender identity, and modern feminism. She said that some of the points these critics made were "more valid than they'd previously seemed" and though she did not repudiate any of her past positions on these issues, the critics welcomed Green's overtures.

In 2018, Green published her first book, Sex Plus: Learning, Loving and Enjoying Your Body. From 2019 to 2022, Green hosted a podcast, titled Indirect Message, which "explores how the internet is changing society."

=== Clinical mental health counseling career ===
On July 1, 2024, Green received an associate license from the North Carolina Board of Licensed Clinical Mental Health Counselors. 30 days later, Green founded her therapy clinic, that would later be called Green Center Therapy in Winston-Salem, North Carolina. Green's therapy clinic also offered pro bono therapy sessions for Western North Carolina residents impacted by Hurricane Helene.

== Personal life ==
Soon after leaving the Church of Jesus Christ of Latter-day Saints, Green fell into a state of deep depression and struggled with self-harm and suicidal thoughts. She began to work with a therapist who helped her through her depression. She is now an atheist, and occasionally attends the Unitarian Universalist church.

Green identifies as pansexual. She is married and currently lives in Winston-Salem, North Carolina.

== See also ==
- List of LGBT people from Portland, Oregon
