= Questioning (sexuality and gender) =

Process of self-exploration

The questioning of one's sexual orientation, sexual identity, gender, or all three is a process of exploration by people who may be unsure, still exploring, or concerned about applying a social label to themselves for various reasons. The letter "Q" is sometimes added to the end of the acronym LGBTQ (lesbian, gay, bisexual, transgender, queer), making it LGBTQQ, with the second "Q" referring to "questioning".

Sexual orientation, sexual identity, or gender does not always coincide with one other, meaning, for example, if an individual identifies themselves as a heterosexual, they may not only be attracted to someone of the opposite sex and have sexual interactions with someone who is of the same sex without necessarily identifying themselves as bisexual. The understanding that one does not need to apply any type of gender or sexuality label to oneself is relatively publicly and socially prominent in the modern day, along with gender and sexual fluidity, which is also more openly discussed and accepted in today's society. Individuals who do not identify themselves as male, female, transgender, heterosexual, homosexual, bisexual, asexual or feel their sexuality is fluid, may refer to themselves as gender neutral, genderqueer, non-binary, or agender.

== Adolescents and other youths ==
During the stage of adolescence, the notions of questioning one's sexuality or gender, along with the diverse areas related to it, can arise as the construction of identity begins to form. It is a stage where exploration, learning, and experimenting often occur. While some youths have little to no issue in self-identifying, many youths encounter a great deal of confusion and uncertainty at this stage. They may have issues in understanding their sexuality, sexual orientation, gender identity, or whether or not they fit into any preconceived social normative labels. Studies have shown that 57% of people first had questioning thoughts on their sexuality or gender between the ages of 11 and 15.

=== Behaviors and development ===
According to Sarah Gardner, the ways in which humans behave are based on five basic needs: survival, love and belonging, power, freedom, and enjoyment. An individual will shift their behaviors in order to satisfy these needs. In the case of questioning youth, some or all of these needs are not met. When one or more of these needs are not fulfilled, their behaviors may become aggravated, confused or discouraged in trying to satisfy the need to either survive, feel loved or that they belong, achieve freedom, gain power or feel a sense of enjoyment.

Gender identity is crucial in the development of young individuals as it is a big part of their personal social identity. The confusion and questioning involved in one's formation of gender identity can be influenced by the need to fit into gender binaries or adhere to social ideals constructed by mainstream society. The assigned sex of a person at birth, otherwise known as natal sex, is not always interchangeable with the terms gender identity and gender role. Natal sex and gender identity are, however, different components of identity, and gender identity does not necessarily unfold in the direction of one's natal sex. Gender identity is not the same as gender role; gender identity is a core sense of self, whereas gender role involves the adaptation of socially constructed markers (clothing, mannerism, behaviors) traditionally thought of as masculine and feminine. Natal sex, gender identity, and gender role interact in complex ways and each of these is also separate from the direction of one's sexual attraction. The social constructs of masculinity and femininity may also play a factor in causing confusion for youths; it may impact the way they feel they have to behave if they identify with certain gender identities or sexual orientations.

The awareness of sexual orientation strongly contributes to the formulation of gender identity. The two are equally important in contributing to the development of an individual during the adolescent stage. The questioning of a young individual's sexuality or sexual orientation comes into play in a variety of situations; regardless of experience or lack thereof. For example, an individual who generally identifies themselves as homosexual may also have sexual interactions with the opposite sex, but do not necessarily feel that they are bisexual. Furthermore, an individual may also identify with a definitive sexual orientation or gender without having any, or only some sexual interactions or experiences.

=== Social ===
The social aspect is a significant factor that can cause questioning youth to feel they have an unsafe environment in establishing their sexuality or gender. The need for social acceptance by their peers and other members of society during adolescence gives the individual the feeling of belonging; therefore, the fear of rejection or discrimination can keep youths from being public with their uncertain identity.

Heteronormativity can contribute to the hesitation of youths in being public with their gender identity and sexuality. This can be due to the fact that one may feel they do not fit with the social constructs of heterosexuality, masculinity, or femininity – which are ideals that do not necessarily include the exceptions and differences of other genders and sexualities. Gender acceptance has two main influences: misunderstanding and fear of the unknown. An inner conflict may arise when the individual transitions to another gender. The social construct of heteronormativity is directly related to gender binary; these two constructs are often conditioned in the mainstream to be more accepted, therefore impacting the acceptance of other genders and sexualities, ones that may not fit into those norms or are fluid between multiple categories.

Some youths avoid coming out or even acknowledging their sexual orientation because of homophobia. Acknowledging their lesbian, gay or bisexual identity, or other identity, can bring an end to confusion. With regard to gender identity, terms for those who do not comply to the gender binary system are, for example, genderqueer, agender, or gender neutral. An article in The Journal of Counseling & Development states, "Sexual minorities experience two types of stigma stress that differ based on the objective and subjective nature of stress. Because of its persistent nature, stigma stress can be characterized as a chronic stressor that sexual minorities face, placing them at higher risk than individuals who are not sexual minorities of developing a ruminative coping style." When an individual feels that none of the existing gender identity terms apply to them, or that they do not fit accurately into any binaries, it may often lead to feelings of pressure, loneliness, abnormality and hopelessness.

According to the American Psychological Association, those who struggle with acknowledging their sexuality or gender identity may be at higher risk of experiencing suicidal thoughts, depression, unprotected sex or turning to harmful coping mechanisms such as drug abuse, alcohol or self harm. Studies show that questioning youth are at higher risk for victimization, suicidal thoughts, and drug and alcohol abuse even more so than lesbian, gay and bisexual youth, possibly due to marginalization from straight and LGB peers alike.

The Advocates for Youth Organization states that "studies establish links between attempting suicide and gender nonconformity, early awareness of sexual orientation, stress, violence, lack of support, school dropout, family problems, homelessness, and substance use." For questioning adolescent individuals, not only is the acceptance from their peers important to them, the acceptance of their family is also equally as important. However, not all youths receive the support they require from their families during the process of questioning. Ryan C. et al., of San Francisco State University state, "GLBTQ youth with more rejecting families are eight times more likely to report having attempted suicide, nearly six more times as likely to report high levels of depression, more than three times as likely to use illegal drugs, and three times as likely to be at high risk for HIV and sexually transmitted diseases than GLBTQ youth with less rejecting families." The social community is a crucial aspect in contributing to the wellness of one's being and mental health. Individuals often feel more positive about their sexual orientation and gender identity through support and positive reinforcement, especially from family, friends, and acquaintances.

Adolescents who are questioning and receive support can often live satisfying and healthy lives and move through the usual process of adolescent development; those who face bullying, ostracism or other forms of oppression are more likely to be at risk of experiencing suicidal thoughts, and to engage in high-risk activities, such as unprotected sex and alcohol and drug abuse. Questioning youth are at higher risk for victimization, suicidal thoughts, and drug and alcohol abuse even more so than lesbian, gay and bisexual youth, possibly due to marginalization from straight and LGBTQ+ peers alike. A disorder of anxiety or depression related to an uncertainty about one's gender identity or sexual orientation has been classified as sexual maturation disorder by the World Health Organization in the ICD-10, under "Psychological and behavioural disorders associated with sexual development and orientation". Sexual orientation by itself is not a disorder and is not classified under this heading. It also differs from ego-dystonic sexual orientation where the sexual orientation or gender identity is repressed or denied.

=== Support and help ===
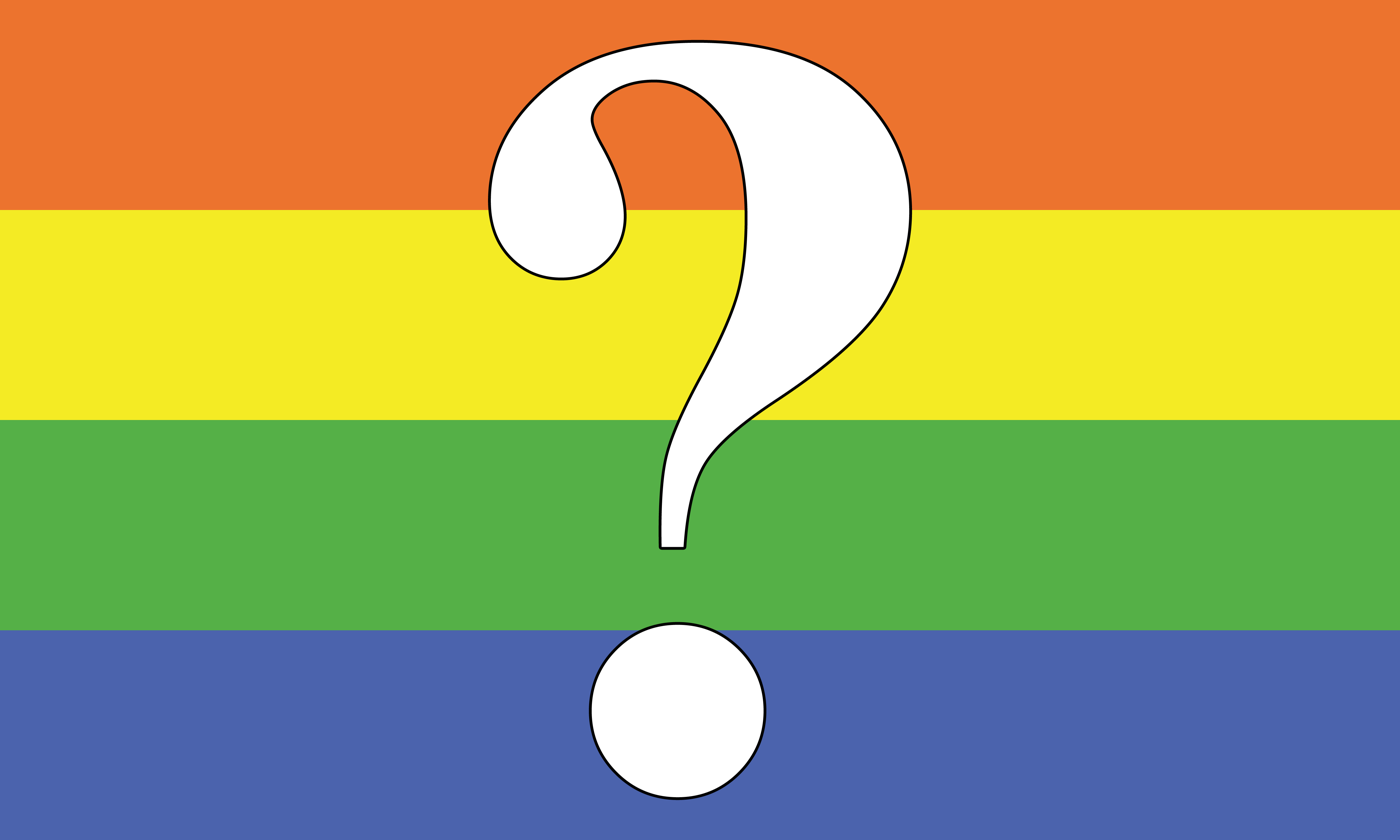
The questioning flag

Many LGBT student groups and literature include questioning; in the case of gay–straight alliance groups, they do so in part so students are not compelled to label themselves or choose a sexual identity. The pressures, stigmas and fear of discrimination by peers and society, may discourage many to face the problems developed through questioning gender and sexuality. The support of friends and family is important during the stage of adolescence as it is the time where one is developing their identity and experiencing the most change physically and mentally. The LGBTQ community has formed many support groups, help centers and online spaces that can assist youths who seek guidance and provide helpful information in regards to one's questioning of gender and sexuality. It is suggested by psychology practitioners for questioning individuals to seek help through platforms such as therapy, support groups, online community forums, mental health organizations, suicide prevention lifelines and counseling.

An example of a national organization dedicated to providing crisis intervention, support and suicide prevention services for LGBTQ youths is The Trevor Project. They provide services such as Trevor Lifeline, TrevorChat, TrevorText and Trevor Support Centre.

== Adults ==
Because of the fluidity of identity and sexuality, exploration and questioning can also occur in adulthood. Studies have shown that adults spanning from ages 18 to 75 years can identify a shift in their attractions and/or gender-identity throughout their lifetime. In a survey research participated by self-identified transgender and gender-nonconforming adults, 58.2% reported having changed attractions in their lifetime. In a longitudinal study with participants made up of polyamorous and monogamous adults with varying sexual identities and sexual orientation, 34% of participants reported some kind of sexuality shift throughout the experiment and just over 10% of participants shifted between the seven coded sexual identity categories.

Being surrounded by a heteronormative and non-queer friendly environment is one factor that can delay or prevent an individual from questioning or exploring their sexual orientation and identity. A study found that the absence of accurate and positive LGBTQ+ information and discussions are strongly associated with higher levels of stress in adults who are in the questioning or exploration process.

=== Heterosexual women ===
In comparison to heterosexual-identified men and both sexual minority-identified men and women, heterosexual-identified women are more likely to be in an identity development phase called identity foreclosure, a non-explorative state where the individual has yet to question a part of their identity including their sexual orientation or gender. This often results in the adoption of the default sexual standard of society, committing to heterosexuality without question. Adrienne Rich writes about how society encourages heterosexuality in all aspects of female livelihood in her essay "Compulsory Heterosexuality and Lesbian Existence" by not only shaping institutions to provide social and economic benefits for adopting the heterocentric mindset, but also creating barriers to behaviors that challenge the standard, including homosexuality.

When looking into events or behaviors that may begin exploration or questioning by young women, a study composed of female college students categorized five events that had induced the questioning process within them. Among the five, the most popular experiences revolved around being surrounded by a more positive and open LGBTQ-friendly community, and self-assessments of same-sex behavior. Examples of such self-assessments would involve reflecting on their feelings after kissing a female, or comparing that experience to their feelings towards men.

== See also ==
- Bi-curious
- Kinsey scale
