= Journal of College Counseling =

- Discipline: Psychotherapy & Counseling
- Language: English
- Edited by: Joshua C. Watson

Publication details
- History: 1998-present
- Publisher: Wiley-Blackwell on behalf of the American Counseling Association
- Frequency: Biannual

Standard abbreviations
- ISO 4: J. Coll. Couns.

Indexing
- ISSN: 1099-0399 (print); 2161-1882 (web)

Links
- Journal homepage; Online access; Online archive

Journal of College Counseling is a quarterly peer-reviewed academic journal published by Wiley-Blackwell on behalf of the American Counseling Association and the American College Counseling Association. The journal was established in 1998. Its current editor-in-chief is Joshua C. Watson. The journal focuses on college counseling research and the practice of counselors working in higher education settings.
