= Santa Clara University School of Education and Counseling Psychology =

Coordinates: 37.345927°N 121.93293°W

The School of Education and Counseling Psychology at Santa Clara University was created in the fall of 2001 and brought together graduate programs in Counseling Psychology and Education. Approximately 800 graduate students are enrolled in the school, with 200 studying psychology and 400 studying education.
