= Journal of Addictions & Offender Counseling =

- Discipline: Psychotherapy & Counseling
- Language: English
- Edited by: Trevor Buser

Publication details
- History: 1980–present
- Publisher: Wiley-Blackwell on behalf of the American Counseling Association
- Frequency: Biannual

Standard abbreviations
- ISO 4: J. Addict. Offender Couns.

Indexing
- ISSN: 1055-3835 (print); 2161-1874 (web)

Links
- Journal homepage; Online access; Online archive

Journal of Addictions & Offender Counseling is a biannual peer-reviewed academic journal published by Wiley-Blackwell on behalf of the American Counseling Association and the International Association of Addictions and Offender Counselors. The journal was established in 1980. Its current editor-in-chief is Trevor Buser. The journal focuses on prevention and treatment programs, the attitudes and behaviors of substance abuse professionals, tested techniques, treatment of adolescents and adults, and qualitative and quantitative studies.
