= History of school counseling in the United States =

The history of school counseling in the United States of America shares a fairly common early history, then begins to vary greatly, depending on how local communities have chosen to provide academic, college and career readiness, social skills, and interpersonal competencies to primary school through secondary school students. Much of these differences are based on varying economic resources and social capital needs and resources, and differences between what is allowed in public versus private educational settings. Modern school counseling is generally done by what is now referred to as a guidance counselor, as part of a school's school counseling (or guidance counseling) program.

== History ==
=== Early years ===
The first school counselors in the United States emerged in the late 1800s, the time of the Industrial Revolution. However, the United States may not be the first place that school counseling was recognized. There have been traces of school counselors dating back to the late 16th century. An argument has been made that says that counseling and guidance principles began in ancient Greece and Rome with the philosophical teachings of Plato and Aristotle. Evidence suggests that techniques of modern-day counseling was practiced by Catholic priests in the Middle Ages. Tomaso Garzoni wrote a book called "Universal Plaza of all the Professions in the World" (1626), which was a text about career options. This relates to what a school counselor in high school and college would talk to students about today.

In the United States, the school counseling profession began as a vocational guidance movement. Jesse B. Davis is considered the first school counselor in the United States because he was the first to implement systematic guidance programs in schools. In 1907, he became the principal of a high school and encouraged the school English teachers to use compositions and lessons to relate career interests, develop character, and avoid behavioral problems. Many others during this time did the same. For example, in 1908, Frank Parsons, "Father of Vocational Guidance" established the Bureau of Vocational Guidance to assist young people in making the transition from school to work.

From the 1920s to the 1930s, school counseling and guidance grew because of the rise of progressive education in schools. National Association for College Admission Counseling is founded in 1937. This movement emphasized personal, social, moral development. Many schools reacted to this movement as anti-educational, saying that schools should teach only the fundamentals of education. This, combined with the economic hardship of the Great Depression, led to a decline in school counseling and guidance.

In the 1940s, the U.S. used psychologists and counselors to select, recruit, and train military personnel. This propelled the counseling movement in schools by providing ways to test students and meet their needs. Schools accepted these military tests openly. Also, Carl Rogers' emphasis on helping relationships during this time influenced the profession of school counseling.

=== 1950s and 60s ===
In the 1950s the government established the Guidance and Personnel Services Section in the Division of State and Local School Systems. In 1957, the Soviet Union launched Sputnik I. Out of concern that the Russians were beating the U.S. in the space race, which had military implications, and that there were not enough scientists and mathematicians, the American government passed the National Defense Education Act, which spurred a huge growth in vocational guidance through large amounts of funding. Since the 1960s, the profession of school counseling has continued to grow as new legislation and new professional developments were established to refine and further the profession and improve education. On January 1, 2006, congress officially declared February 6–10 as National School Counseling Week.

The 1960s was also a time of great federal funding in the United States for land grant colleges and universities interested in establishing and growing what are now known as Counselor Education programs. School counseling began to shift from a focus exclusively on career development to a focus on student personal and social issues paralleling the rise of social justice and civil rights movements in the United States. It was also in the late 60s and early 1970s that Norm Gysbers began the work to shift from seeing school counselors as solitary professionals into a more strategic and systemic goal of having a comprehensive developmental school counseling program for all students K-12. His and his colleagues' work and research evidence showing strong correlations between fully implemented school counseling programs and student academic success was critical to beginning to show an evidence base for the profession especially at the high school level based on their work in the state of Missouri.

=== 1980s and 90s ===
But school counseling in the 1980s and early 1990s in the United States was not seen as a player in educational reform efforts buffeting the educational community. The danger was the profession becoming irrelevant as the standards-based educational movement gained strength in the 1990s with little evidence of systemic effectiveness for school counselors. In response, Campbell & Dahir (1997) consulted widely with school counselors at the elementary, middle, and high school levels and created the ASCA National Model: A Framework for School Counseling Programs with three core domains (Academic, Career, Personal/Social), nine standards, and specific competencies and indicators for K-12 students.

The publication of the ASCA standards in 1997 ushered in a unique period of professionalization and strengthening of school counseling identity, roles, and programs. A year later, the first systemic meta-analysis of school counseling was published and gave the profession a wake-up call in terms of the need to focus on outcome research and the small set of methodologically accurate school counseling outcome research studies in academic, career, and personal/social domains.

=== National Center for Transforming School Counseling ===
The National Center for Transforming School Counseling (NCTSC) at The Education Trust was founded in 2003. Its foci included (1) changing how school counseling was taught at the graduate level in Counselor Education programs and (2) changing the practices of K-12 school counselors in districts throughout the US to teach school counselors prevention and intervention skills to help close achievement and opportunity gaps for all students. By 2008, NCTSC consultants had worked in over 100 districts including most major cities.

In 2008, Rowman Littlefield Education published The New School Counselor: Strategies for Universal Academic Achievement. The text, written by Rita Schellenberg, a practicing school counselor and counselor educator, describes the new vision for school counseling and guides school counselors and pre-service school counselors through accountable, data-driven programming. Schellenberg introduces Standards Blending, a crosswalking strategy that hold the potential to be culturally sensitive and effective in enhancing academic achievement and closing the achievement gap.

=== Recent history ===
In 2002, the American School Counselor Association released the ASCA National Model framework for school counseling programs, written by Dr. Trish Hatch and Dr. Judy Bowers, comprising some of the top school counseling components in the field into one model—the work of Norm Gysbers, Curly & Sharon Johnson, Robert Myrick, Dahir & Campbell's ASCA National Standards, and the skill-based focus for closing gaps from the Education Trust's Pat Martin and Reese House into one document. ASCA also developed the RAMP (Recognized ASCA Model Programs) Awards to honor school counseling programs that have fully implemented the ASCA National Model with demonstrable evidence of success for K-12 students (www.schoolcounselor.org).

In 2003, the Center for School Counseling Outcome Research was developed as a clearinghouse for evidence-based practice with regular research briefs disseminated and original research projects developed and implemented with founding director Jay Carey. One of the research fellows, Tim Poynton, developed the EZAnalyze software program for all school counselors to use as free-ware to assist in using data-based interventions.

In 2004, the ASCA Code of Ethics was substantially revised to focus on issues of equity, closing gaps, and ensuring all students received access to a K-12 school counseling program. The National Office for School Counselor Advocacy (NOSCA) developed scholarships for research on college counseling by K-12 school counselors and how it is taught in School Counselor Education programs. They also created Advocacy Awards to focus on best practices in college counseling programs in K-12

- that show effective school counseling practices in creating college-going cultures with demonstrated results in ensuring high rates of college admissions for large percentages of students of nondominant backgrounds.

In 2008, The first NOSCA study was released by Jay Carey and colleagues focusing on innovations in selected College Board "Inspiration Award" schools where school counselors collaborated inside and outside their schools for high college-going rates and strong college-going cultures in schools with large numbers of students of nondominant backgrounds. Also in 2008, the American School Counselor Association released School Counseling Competencies focused on assisting school counseling programs to effectively implement school counseling programs based on the ASCA Model.

The ASCA Model encourages professional school counselors to use crosswalking strategies and to create action plans and results reports that demonstrate "how" school counselors are making a difference in the lives of students. The most recent version of the ASCA National Model was published in 2012.
