= American College Counseling Association =

Association of mental health professionals

- Formation: 1991
- Headquarters: Indianapolis, Indiana
- Website: https://collegecounseling.org/

The American College Counseling Association (ACCA) is a division of the American Counseling Association (ACA) for counselors working in higher education.

== History ==
ACCA was created in 1991, in response to the disaffiliation of the American College Personnel Association (ACPA), to ensure a continued place within ACA (then American Association for Counseling and Development) for those working in colleges and universities. Gene Meadows served as the first president of ACCA.

Visions, the organization's newsletter, is published three times per year and is now disseminated electronically. The Journal of College Counseling was initiated in 1998 as a scholarly journal with an orientation to the work of practitioners.

Since 2002, ACCA has also sponsored a biennial national conference, co-hosted with one of its state divisions, in addition to its annual business meeting and other activities held at the ACA conference.
