= Licensed professional counselor =

Professional license

Licensed professional counselor (LPC) is a licensure for mental health professionals in some countries.

In the US, licensed professional counselors (or in some states, "licensed clinical mental health counselors" or "licensed clinical professional counselors" or "licensed mental health counselors") provide mental health and substance abuse care to millions of Americans. Licensed professional counselors (LPCs) are doctoral and master's-level mental health service providers, trained to work with individuals, families, and groups in treating mental, behavioral, and emotional problems and disorders. LPCs make up a large percentage of the workforce employed in community mental health centers, agencies, universities, hospitals, and organizations, and are employed within and covered by managed care organizations and health plans. LPCs also work with active duty military personnel and their families, as well as veterans.

Licenses are awarded for professional counselors (LPC) and professional counselor supervisors (LPC-S); Licensed Professional Counselor Associates, who are accruing hours towards full licensure under supervision, may be designated with the suffix "-A"; this also applies to associate Licensed Marriage and Family Therapists (LMFT) who are designated as: LMFT-A.

In the U.S., the exact title varies by state, but the other most frequently used title is licensed mental health counselor (LMHC). Several U.S. states, including Illinois, Maine, and Tennessee, have implemented a two-tier system whereby both the LPC and LCPC (or equivalent) are used. In those states, higher tier professionals are granted the privilege to practice independently. However, in most states, LPC's or LMHC's may practice independently. Licensed Professional Counselors are one of the six types of licensed mental health professionals who provide psychotherapy in the United States.

LPCs are required to complete supervised clinical experience and pass a state licensing exam, which varies across different states. Examples include the National Counselor Examination for Licensure and Certification (NCE) and the National Certified Mental Health Counselor Examination (NCMHCE). Federal and state laws regulate LPCs, protecting their titles and defining their scope of practice, while also ensuring client protections. Additionally, LPCs who are members of professional associations or hold additional certifications must adhere to the respective codes of ethics of those organizations or certification bodies.

== Requirements for professional counselors ==
=== United States ===
LPC (or variations e.g., LCPC, LMHC, etc.) licensure is recognized in 50 states in the United States, as well as the District of Columbia, Guam, and Puerto Rico. The requirements vary from one jurisdiction to the next. Most states require some combination of a master's degree, counseling experience and supervision, as well as passing a national examination, such as the National Counselor Examination (NCE) and/or the National Clinical Mental Health Counseling Examination (NCMHCE).

A summary of requirements from the state of Texas LPC board serves as an example; requirements vary from state to state. For example, practicum/internship requirements (during the master's degree) vary significantly between states (e.g., 300 hours in Texas and 1000 hours in Vermont). Course requirements and credit amounts also vary, making reciprocity between states difficult for many licensed counselors. The Counseling Compact, an interstate licensure compact, allows a counselor licensed in one member state to obtain a "privilege to practice" in other member states. By April 2026, 38 states and the District of Columbia had enacted compact legislation, and Arizona, Minnesota, Ohio and Louisiana had begun granting privileges.

1. A master's degree or doctoral degree in counseling or a related field.
2. Academic course work in each of the following areas: normal human growth and development; abnormal human behavior; appraisal or assessment techniques; counseling theories; counseling methods or techniques (individual and group); research; lifestyle and career development; social, cultural and family issues; and professional orientation.
3. As part of the graduate program, a supervised practicum experience that is primarily counseling in nature. The practicum should be at least 300 clock-hours with at least 100 clock-hours of direct client contact. Academic credit for the practicum must appear on the applicant's transcript.
4. After completion of the graduate degree and before application, an applicant must take and pass the National Counselor Exam and the Texas Jurisprudence Exam. After receiving a temporary LPC license from the board, the applicant may begin the supervised post-graduate counseling experience (internship). 3000 clock-hours with at least 1,500 being direct client contact of internship under the supervision of a board-approved supervisor is required. The 3000 clock-hours may not be completed in a period of less than 18 months."

Beginning January 1, 2024, mental health counselors became eligible to enroll in Medicare and bill for their services directly, under section 4121 of the Consolidated Appropriations Act, 2023.

==== Exemptions ====
Some states, such as Oregon, have broad exemptions that allow the practice of professional counseling without a license.

In Alabama, nothing in the chapter regulating professional counseling applies to the activities, services, titles, and descriptions of persons employed, as professionals or as volunteers, in the practice of counseling for IRS recognized 501(c)(3) public and private nonprofit organizations or charities. [Alabama Code 34-8A-3-a-6]

=== Canada ===
In the Canadian province of Quebec, the Ordre des conseillers et conseilleres d'orientation et psychoeducateurs et psychoeducatrices du Quebec (OCCOPPQ) grants counselor licensure. The Canadian Counselling and Psychotherapy Association, CCPA offers a distinct certification, Canadian Certified Counsellor (CCC), separate from the regular professional membership.

The Canadian Professional Counsellors Association (CPCA) is a national competency-based association that provides the designation of Registered Professional Counsellor (RPC) to its members. Unlike degree-based associations, a specific degree level does not automatically qualify applicants for membership. Instead, the CPCA requires core competencies in education and experience prior to taking a qualifying exam and undergoing psychological testing as part of the membership application process. Counsellors must then embark on a two-year candidacy under the supervision of an approved Clinical Supervisor prior to becoming a full member. The CPCA membership roles are a mixture of Diploma, Bachelor, Master, and PhD level degree holders, and its primary purpose is the protection of the public and the promotion of competency in the mental health profession in Canada.

The Canadian Addiction Counsellors Certification Federation (CACCF) promotes, certifies and monitors the competency of addiction specific counsellors in Canada using current and effective practices, which are internationally recognized. The certifications CACCF issues and its professional conduct review process provide public protection for counsellors, employers, regulatory agencies, clients and their families.

=== China ===
The Ministry of Labor and Human Resources grants counselor licensure.

=== Malaysia ===
In Malaysia, Lembaga Kaunselor Malaysia grants counselor licensure.

== See also ==
- List of counseling topics
- Mental health counselor
