= Student teaching =

Period of supervised practice for pre-service teachers

Student teaching or teaching practice is a supervised instructional experience; usually the culminating course in a university or college undergraduate education or graduate school program leading to teacher education and certification. Student teaching is part of pre-service teacher education programs such as Early Childhood (Birth-Grade 3), Middle Childhood (Grades 4-9), and Adolescence to Young Adult (Grades 7-12). It is required by those earning either a Bachelor of Education or Master of Education degree, as well as liberal arts Bachelor of Science or Bachelor of Arts degrees with a major in education.

Student teaching is required for practicing teachers who are not yet certified to teach. It is different from a practicum, which is required when a student already holds certification to teach, yet wants a certificate extension to teach another area of specialization; they are both college-supervised field-based experiences.

The student teaching experience lasts about the length of a school term, semester or quarter; long enough to fulfill the college’s assigned tasks. This experience gives the prospective teaching professional an opportunity to teach under the supervision of a permanently certified teacher. It is typically and unpaid internship, however states across the U.S have been making efforts to pay their student teachers.

California, Colorado, Georgia, Illinois, Kentucky, Massachusetts, Maryland, Missouri, Minnesota, New Jersey, New Mexico, Pennsylvania, South Dakota, and Utah have all passed bills that allow schools or student teachers to apply for compensation. The specific amount allotted is dependent on the state and their policies. Some states offer compensation to school districts and allow them to supply it to their student teachers. Other state prefers the educators to apply themselves.

The student teacher is usually placed in a neighboring or participating school. The student teacher is monitored by the cooperating teacher from the school, as well as a supervisor through the college. The supervisor acts as a liaison between the cooperating teacher and the head of the college’s student teaching department.

The student teacher normally initially shadows the cooperating teacher, eventually gaining more responsibility in teaching the class as the days and weeks progress. Eventually, the student teacher will assume most of the teaching responsibilities for the class including class management, lesson planning, assessment, and grading. Thus, the student teacher is able to experience the role of the teacher more fully as the classroom teacher takes on the observation role in the class. There is sometimes a "phasing out" week when the student teacher returns the teaching role back to the regular teacher. In the Philippines, observation is separated in a different subject called Field Study, while student teaching is different subject on the second semester of the academic year.

The supervisor, as well as cooperating teacher, monitor the progress of the student teacher throughout the experience, ensuring satisfactory work. A grade of Pass or Fail in student teaching, as well as satisfactory completion of a school's education program, is an indication as to whether the college recommends the student for certification to teach.

== Student teaching as a learning challenge ==
Student teaching has been used as a challenge to foreign language learners to facilitate the integration of their language skills by placing them at the center of classroom activities.

Student teaching philosophy has proven to be a decisive between the newer cohort of teachers, and older educators. Trained under differing teaching philosophies, both groups have a difference of opinion on instructional methodology. The two most prevalent teaching philosophies in America are called Modern teaching philosophy and Traditional teaching philosophy respectively. The former relies on inquiry-based instruction, while the later relies heavily on lecture-based teaching. The differing of philosophies is being seen at every rung of the educational ladder, from Pre-K to Collegiate instruction.

In describing the difference between the two methodologies, one can note characteristics that define them. In traditional teaching methods, there is a high emphasis on attending lectures, reading texts, and solving problems. In modern teaching approaches, there is a high premium put on developing one's unique knowledge through the pursuit of the scientific method, using such didactic methods as observation and hypothesis.

Another hallmark of the modern teaching approach is the incorporation of technology, a highly useful skill that is required of most who intend on entering the job market in future years. Examples of technological inclusion within the classroom has become supported in many counties through the United States. Most schools are equipped with smart boards and include roaming laptop carts that allow all students, regardless of financial ability, gain experience with the technology that will make them successful in the next steps of their lives.
