= School counselor =

Education occupation of guidance and counseling

A school counselor is a certified/licensed professional who provides academic, career, college readiness, and social-emotional support for school students. There are school counselor positions within each level of schooling (elementary, middle, high, and college). By developing and following a school counseling program, school counselors are able to provide students of all ages with the appropriate support and guidance needed for overall success.

== Purpose ==
Professional school counselors ideally implement a school counseling program that promotes and enhances student achievement.

=== Methods ===
The four main school counseling program interventions include school counseling curriculum classroom lessons and annual academic, career/college access/affordability/admission, and social-emotional planning for every student; and group and individual counseling for some students.

School counselor interventions include individual and group counseling for some students. For example, if a student's behavior is interfering with his or her achievement, the school counselor may observe that student in a class, provide consultation to teachers and other stakeholders to develop (with the student) a plan to address the behavioral issue(s), and then collaborate to implement and evaluate the plan. They also provide consultation services to family members such as college access/affordability/admission, career development, parenting skills, study skills, child and adolescent development, mental health issues, and help with school-home transitions.

School counselor interventions for all students include annual academic/career/college access/affordability/admission planning K–12 and leading classroom developmental lessons on academic, career/college, and social-emotional topics. The topics of mental health, multiculturalism (Portman, 2009), anti-racism, and school safety are important areas of focus for school counselors. Often school counselors will coordinate outside groups to help with student needs such as academics, or coordinate a program that teaches about child abuse or drugs, through on-stage drama.

School counselors develop, implement, and evaluate school counseling programs that deliver academic, career, college access/affordability/admission, and social-emotional competencies to all students in their schools. For example, the ASCA National Model includes the following four main areas:

- Foundation (Define as of 2019) – a school counseling program mission statement, a vision statement, a beliefs statement, SMART Goals; ASCA Mindsets & Behaviors & ASCA Code of Ethics;
- Delivery System (Deliver as of 2019) – how school counseling core curriculum lessons, planning for every student, and individual and group counseling are delivered in direct and indirect services to students (80% of school counselor time);
- Management System (Manage as of 2019) – calendars; use of data tool; use of time tool; administrator-school counselor agreement; school counseling program advisory council; small group, school counseling core curriculum, and closing the gap action plans; and
- Accountability System (Assess as of 2019) – school counseling program assessment; small group, school counseling core curriculum, and closing-the-gap results reports; and school counselor performance evaluations based on school counselor competencies.

The school counseling program model (ASCA, 2012, 2019) is implemented using key skills from the National Center for Transforming School Counseling's Transforming School Counseling Initiative: Advocacy, Leadership, Teaming and Collaboration, and Systemic Change.

School counselors are expected to follow a professional code of ethics in many countries. For example, In the US, they are the American School Counselor Association (ASCA) School Counselor Ethical Code, the American Counseling Association (ACA) Code of Ethics, and the National Association for College Admission Counseling (NACAC) Statement of Principles of Good Practice (SPGP).

=== Role confusion ===
School counselors have constantly reported being burdened with tasks not related to the emotional, social, and academic support of their students, such as clerical activities, serving as substitute teachers, or conducting disciplinary actions. This has led to role confusion, the phenomenon of school counselors losing sight of the roles and responsibilities they were trained to do. Role confusion arose as a result of the lack of a clear definition for what the day-to-day role of a counselor is in various school settings before ASCA in 2012. Even after ASCA guidelines were published, many counselors were unable to shift their roles and responsibilities to match these guidelines and continued their roles as they were prior.

Role confusion has also been attributed to general overwork of counselors, as even if they know what they can do, they do not have the time or resources to serve their students. ASCA guidelines recommend a 250:1 ratio of students to school counselors, yet figured from 2014-2015 school year show that on average, schools have a 482:1 ratio of students to counselors.

== Types of school counselors ==
=== Elementary school counselor ===
Elementary school counselors provide academic, career, college access, and personal and social competencies and planning to all students, and individual and group counseling for some students and their families to meet the developmental needs of young children K–6. Transitions from pre-school to elementary school and from elementary school to middle school are an important focus for elementary school counselors. Increased emphasis is placed on accountability for helping close achievement and opportunity gaps at the elementary level as more school counseling programs move to evidence-based work with data and specific results.

School counseling programs that deliver specific competencies to all students help to close achievement and opportunity gaps. To facilitate individual and group school counseling interventions, school counselors use developmental, cognitive-behavioral, person-centered (Rogerian) listening and influencing skills, systemic, family, multicultural, narrative, and play therapy theories and techniques. Sink & Stroh (2003) released a research study showing the effectiveness of elementary school counseling programs in Washington state.

=== Middle school counselor ===
Middle school counselors provide school counseling curriculum lessons on academic, career, college access, and personal and social competencies, advising and academic/career/college access planning to all students and individual and group counseling for some students and their families to meet the needs of older children/early adolescents in grades 7 and 8.

Middle School college access curricula have been developed to assist students and their families before reaching high school. To facilitate the school counseling process, school counselors use theories and techniques including developmental, cognitive-behavioral, person-centered (Rogerian) listening and influencing skills, systemic, family, multicultural, narrative, and play therapy. Transitional issues to ensure successful transitions to high school are a key area including career exploration and assessment with seventh and eighth grade students. Sink, Akos, Turnbull, & Mvududu released a study in 2008 confirming the effectiveness of middle school comprehensive school counseling programs in Washington state.

=== High school counselor ===
High school counselors provide academic, career, college access, and personal and social competencies with developmental classroom lessons and planning to all students, and individual and group counseling for some students and their families to meet the developmental needs of adolescents (Hatch & Bowers, 2003, 2005, 2012). Emphasis is on college access counseling at the early high school level as more school counseling programs move to evidence-based work with data and specific results that show how school counseling programs help to close achievement, opportunity, and attainment gaps ensuring all students have access to school counseling programs and early college access/affordability/admission activities. The breadth of demands high school counselors face, from educational attainment (high school graduation and some students' preparation for careers and college) to student social and mental health, has led to ambiguous role definition. Summarizing a 2011 national survey of more than 5,330 middle school and high school counselors, researchers argued: "Despite the aspirations of counselors to effectively help students succeed in school and fulfill their dreams, the mission and roles of counselors in the education system must be more clearly defined; schools must create measures of accountability to track their effectiveness; and policymakers and key stakeholders must integrate counselors into reform efforts to maximize their impact in schools across America".

Transitional issues to ensure successful transitions to college, other post-secondary educational options, and careers are a key area. The high school counselor helps students and their families prepare for post-secondary education including college and careers (e.g. college, careers) by engaging students and their families in accessing and evaluating accurate information on what the National Office for School Counselor Advocacy calls the eight essential elements of college and career counseling: (1) College Aspirations, (2) Academic Planning for Career and College Readiness, (3) Enrichment and Extracurricular Engagement, (4) College and Career Exploration and Selection Processes, (5) College and Career Assessments, (6) College Affordability Planning, (7) College and Career Admission Processes, and (8) Transition from High School Graduation to College Enrollment. Some students turn to private college admissions advisors but there is no research evidence that private college admissions advisors have any effectiveness in assisting students attain selective college admissions.

Significant literature points to the correlation between visiting guidance counselors and heighetened academic success. Robinson and Roska's study highlight how as college-going culture increases across the United States, more interactions with guidance counselors is correlated with greater academic success. Lapan, Gysbers & Sun showed correlational evidence of the effectiveness of fully implemented school counseling programs on high school students' academic success. Carey et al.'s 2008 study showed specific best practices from high school counselors raising college-going rates within a strong college-going environment in multiple USA-based high schools with large numbers of students of non-dominant cultural identities.

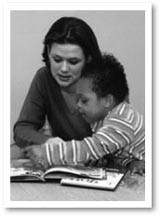
Some school counselors use bibliotherapy, i.e., books and other media, to help students in individual and group counseling and classroom counseling lessons.

== Global overview of school counselling ==
School counseling is established in 62 countries and emerging in another seven. A school counselor is an integral part of the education system in countries representing over half of the world's population and in other countries it is emerging as a critical support for elementary, middle, and high school learning, as well as post-secondary options.

Countries that provide school counseling
Armenia	Australia	Austria	Bahamas	Belgium
Bhutan	Botswana	Brazil	Canada	China
Costa Rica	Croatia	Cyprus	Czech Republic	Denmark
Egypt	Estonia	Finland	France	Gambia
Georgia	Germany	Ghana	Greece	Netherlands
Hong Kong	Iceland	India	Indonesia	Iran
Ireland	Israel	Italy	Japan	Jordan
Latvia	Lebanon	Lithuania	Macau	Malaysia
Malta	Nepal	New Zealand	Nigeria	Norway
Oman	Philippines	Poland	Portugal	Romania
Rwanda	Saudi Arabia	Serbia	Singapore	Slovakia
South Korea	Spain	St. Kitts	Sweden	Switzerland
Syria	Taiwan	Tanzania	Thailand	Trinidad & Tobago
Turkey	Uganda	United Arab Emirates	United Kingdom	United States
Venezuela	Vietnam			

Countries vary in how a school counseling program and services are provided based on economics (funding for schools and school counseling programs), social capital (private versus public schools), and school counselor certification and credentialing movements in education departments, professional associations, and local, state/province, and national legislation.

An international scoping project on school-based counseling showed school counseling is mandatory in 39 countries, 32 USA states, one Australian state, three German states, two countries in the United Kingdom, and three provinces in Canada. Some countries within the Americas, Africa, Asia, Europe, and the Pacific Islands lack formal school counseling programs and instead utilize teachers or psychologists to fulfill the school counselor position with an emphasis on career development. Moreover, In some countries, school counseling is provided by school counseling specialists (for example, Botswana, China, Finland, Israel, Malta, Nigeria, Romania, Taiwan, Turkey, United States). In other cases, school counseling is provided by classroom teachers who either have such duties added to their typical teaching load or teach only a limited load that also includes school counseling activities (India, Japan, Mexico, South Korea, Zambia). The IAEVG focuses on career development with some international school counseling articles and conference presentations. Both the IAEVG and the Vanguard of Counsellors promote school counseling internationally.

== Practice by country ==
=== Australia ===
Students attending Catholic schools in Tasmania are supported by a state-wide school counselling programme operated by CatholicCare Tasmania.

=== Canada ===
The roots of school counseling stemmed from a response to the conditions created by the industrial revolution in the early 1900s. Originally, school counseling was often referred to as vocational guidance, where the goal of the profession was to help individuals find their path in a time where individuals previous ways of making a living had been displaced. As people moved towards industrialized cities, counseling was required to help students navigate these new vocations. With a great discrepancy between the rich and the poor, vocational counseling was initiated to help support disadvantaged students. After World War II, vocational guidance began to shift towards a new movement of counseling, which provided a theoretical backing. As the role of school counselors progressed into the 1960s, 1970s and 1980s there has become more uncertainty as to what the role entails. This role confusion continues into the 21st century, where there is a lack of clear consensus between counselors, other teachers, administration, students and parents on what school counselors should be prioritizing.

=== China ===
China has put substantial financial resources into school counseling with strong growth in urban areas, but China does not mandate school counseling and less than 1% of rural students receive a service.

In China, Thomason & Qiong discussed the main influences on school counseling as Chinese philosophers Confucius and Lao-Tzu, who provided early models of child and adult development who influenced the work of Abraham Maslow and Carl Rogers.

Only 15% of high school students are admitted to college in China, so entrance exams are fiercely competitive. Students entering university graduate at a rate of 99%. Much pressure is put on children and adolescents to study and attend college. This pressure is a central focus of school counseling in China. An additional stressor is that there are not enough places for students to attend college, and over one-third of college graduates cannot find jobs,[19] so career and employment counseling and development are also central in school counseling.

In China, there is a stigma related to social-emotional and mental health issues; therefore, even though most universities and many (urban) primary and secondary schools have school counselors, many students are reluctant to seek counseling for issues such as anxiety and depression. There is no national system of certifying school counselors. Most are trained in Western-developed cognitive methods including REBT, Rogerian, Family Systems, Behavior Modification, and Object Relations. School counselors also recommend Chinese methods such as qigong (deep breathing) and acupuncture, as well as music therapy. Chinese school counselors work within a traditional Chinese worldview of a community and family-based system that lessens the focus on the individual. In Hong Kong, Hui (2000) discussed work moving toward comprehensive school counseling programs and eliminating the older remediation-style model.

Middle school students are a priority for school counseling services in China.

=== United States ===
In the United States, a framework for appropriate and inappropriate school counselor responsibilities and roles is outlined in the American School Counselor Association (ASCA)'s National Model. School counselors are employed in elementary, middle, and high schools, in district supervisory settings, in Counselor Education faculty positions (usually with an earned Ph.D. in Counselor Education in the USA or related graduate doctorates abroad), and post-secondary settings doing academic, career, college access/affordability/admission, and social-emotional counseling, consultation, and program coordination. Their work includes a focus on developmental stages of student growth, including the needs, tasks, and student interests related to those stages.

Professional school counselors meet the needs of students in four basic domains: academic development, career development and college access/affordability/admission, and social-emotional development (Dahir & Campbell, 1997; Hatch & Bowers, 2003, 2005; ASCA, 2012). Knowledge, understanding and skill in these domains are developed through classroom instruction, appraisal, consultation, counseling, coordination, and collaboration. For example, in appraisal, school counselors may use a variety of personality and career assessment methods (such as the Self-Directed Search [SDS] or Career Key [based on the Holland Codes]) to help students explore career and college needs and interests.

Schools play a key role in assessment, access to services, and possible referral to appropriate outside support systems. They provide intervention, prevention, and services to support students' academic, career, and post-secondary education as well as social-emotional growth. The role of school counselors is expansive. School counselors address mental health issues, crisis intervention, and advising for course selection. School counselors consult with all stakeholders to support student needs and may also focus on experiential learning, cooperative education, internships, career shadowing, and entrance to specialized high school programs.

In 2021, the median pay for school counselors in the United States was $60,510 annually or $29.09 per hour. But, a school counselor's salary can range anywhere between $37,550 to $98,190 according the most recent report completed by the U.S. Bureau of Labor Statistics.

Most State Education Boards require that school districts offer school counselors health, dental, and vision insurance. Additionally, school counselors can receive retirement plans as well as professional development assistance. Lastly, school counselors enjoy the same vacation time as students, meaning counselors receive time off for each holiday that falls within the school calendar as well as a summer vacation each year.

The U.S. Bureau of Labor Statistics projects the school counselor position to grow 10% between 2021 and 2031, meaning there will be an additional 32,000 job openings within the next 10 years.

== School counseling associations ==
School counselors around the world are affiliated with various national and regional school counseling associations, and abide by their guidelines. These associations include:

- African Counseling Association (AfCA)
- Asociacion Argentina de Counselors (AAC-Argentina)
- Associacao Portuguesa de Psicoterapia centrada na Pessoa e de Counselling (APPCPC-Portugal)
- Australian Guidance and Counselling Association (AGCA)
- Hong Kong Association of Guidance Masters and Career Masters (HKAGMCM)
- Cypriot Association of School Guidance Counsellors (OELMEK)
- European Counseling Association (ECA)
- France Ministry of Education
- Hellenic Society of Counselling and Guidance (HESCOG-Greece)
- International Baccalaureate (IB)
- International Society of Psychotherapy and Counselling (ISPC)
- International Vanguard of Counsellors (IVC)
- International Association for Educational and Vocational Guidance (IAEVG)
- Association Internationale d'Orientation Scolaire et Professionnelle (AIOSP)
- Internationale Vereinigung für Schul- und Berufsberatung (IVSBB)
- Asociación Internacional para la Orientación Educativa y Profesional (AIOEP)
- Institute of Guidance Counselors (IGC) (Ireland)
- Kenya Association of Professional Counselors (KAPC)
- Department of Education-Malta
- New Zealand Association of Counsellors/Te Roopu Kaiwhiriwhiri o Aotearoa (NZAC)
- Counseling Association of Nigeria (CASSON)
- Philippine Guidance and Counseling Association (PGCA)
- Counseling & Psychotherapy in Scotland (COSCA)
- Singapore Association for Counseling (SAC)
- Federación Española de Orientación y Psicopedagogía (FEOP-Spain)
- The Taiwan Guidance and Counseling Association (TGCA)
- Counselling Children and Young People (BACP affiliate, UK)
- British Association for Counselling and Psychotherapy (BACP-UK)
- American Counseling Association (ACA-USA)
- American School Counselor Association (ASCA-USA)
- Center for Excellence in School Counseling and Leadership (CESCaL) (USA)
- Center for School Counseling Outcome Research (CSCOR-USA) Council for the Accreditation of Counseling and Related Educational Programs (CACREP-USA and international)
- National Board for Certified Counselors (NBCC, USA)
- National Office for School Counselor Advocacy (NOSCA) at The College Board (USA)
- National Center for Transforming School Counseling (NCTSC) at The Education Trust (USA)
- Overseas Association of College Admissions Counselors (OACAC an affiliate of National Association of College Admissions Counselors-USA)
- Canadian Counselling and Psychotherapy Association – National School Counsellors Chapter (CPPA)
- Newfoundland and Labrador Counsellors' and Psychologists' Association
- PEI Counselling Association
- British Columbia School Counsellors
- Guidance Council of the Alberta Teachers' Association
- Ontario School Counsellors' Association
- Nova Scotia School Counsellors Association

== Education, certification, training and accreditation ==
In the United States, a master's degree in counseling, school counseling, or related fields is required to become a school counselor. A few states may require additional training and/or certification to be eligible for employment. However, all public school counselors must receive a state government issued credential in order to practice counseling. Obtaining certification/licensure requires a master's degree, an internship and/or practicum experience with a licensed school counselor, and completion of either a state or national test. A few states may require counselors to have classroom teaching experience prior to becoming a school counselor.

Those wanting to pursue a career in school counseling should ensure that their university program maintains the appropriate accreditation. In the United States, the largest accreditation body for Counselor Education/School Counseling programs is the Council for the Accreditation of Counseling and Related Educational Programs (CACREP). International Counselor Education programs are accredited through a CACREP affiliate, the International Registry of Counselor Education Programs (IRCEP).

The education of school counselors around the world varies based on the laws and cultures of countries and the historical influences of their educational and credentialing systems and professional identities related to who delivers academic, career, college readiness, and personal/social information, advising, curriculum, and counseling and related services.

== Notable school counselors ==
- Jamaal Bowman, US politician
- Fernando Cabrera, US politician
- Donn Charnley, US politician
- Ern Condon, Canadian politician
- Derrick Dalley, Canadian politician
- Susie Sadlowski Garza, US politician
- François Gendron, Canadian politician
- Nellie Shaw Harnar, US historian and educator
- Steve Lindberg, US politician
- Lillian Ortiz-Self, US politician
- Tony Resch, US lacrosse player
- Tom Tillberry, US politician
- Tom Villa, US politician

== See also ==
- Advocacy
- Career counseling
- Career development
- Character education
- Counselor education
- Educational equity
- Educational leadership
- Frank Parsons
- List of counseling topics
- Mental health counseling
- Multicultural education
- Play therapy
- School social worker
- School psychology
