= Practicum =

Practical work experience for students

Work Practicum is the American term for a work placement and is an undergraduate or graduate-level course, often in a specialized field of study, that is designed to give students supervised practical application of a previously or concurrently studied field or theory. Practicums (student teaching) are common for education, mental health counselor, and social work majors. In some cases, the practicum may be a part-time student teaching placement that occurs the semester before a student's full-time student teaching placement.

The process resembles an internship; however, a practicum focuses on observation over work experience. In the case of student teaching placements within the United States, students gain insight into the professional responsibilities of classroom teachers by working under the direct supervision of experienced, state-licensed educators. Student educators work directly with cooperating teachers to plan and implement effective lessons using a variety of teaching strategies and methods to provide differentiated instruction within classrooms and meet the needs of diverse students. To ensure the safety of students and faculty members, background checks are required and must be completed before any teaching candidate can begin their practicum experience.

== Use in Mental Health Training ==
In the United States, the term "practicum" refers to a specific type of training experience that is a core component of educational programs in fields such as psychology, counseling, social work, and other health-related disciplines. This hands-on training is conducted at designated sites where trainees gain practical experience under the supervision of experienced professionals. Practicum sites are often clinics, hospitals, or community service agencies where students apply theoretical knowledge in real-world settings, interact with clients, and develop clinical skills essential for their professional development. Some graduate programs have dedicated practicum sites for their students to attend. Other graduate schools have students find external practicum sites, which has been reported as challenging by some students. The American Psychological Association (APA) and the Council for Accreditation of Counseling and Related Educational Programs (CACREP) provide guidelines and standards for practicum experiences, ensuring that they meet the educational requirements necessary for licensure and professional practice.
