= National Board for Certified Counselors =

National Board for Certified Counselors, Inc. and Affiliates
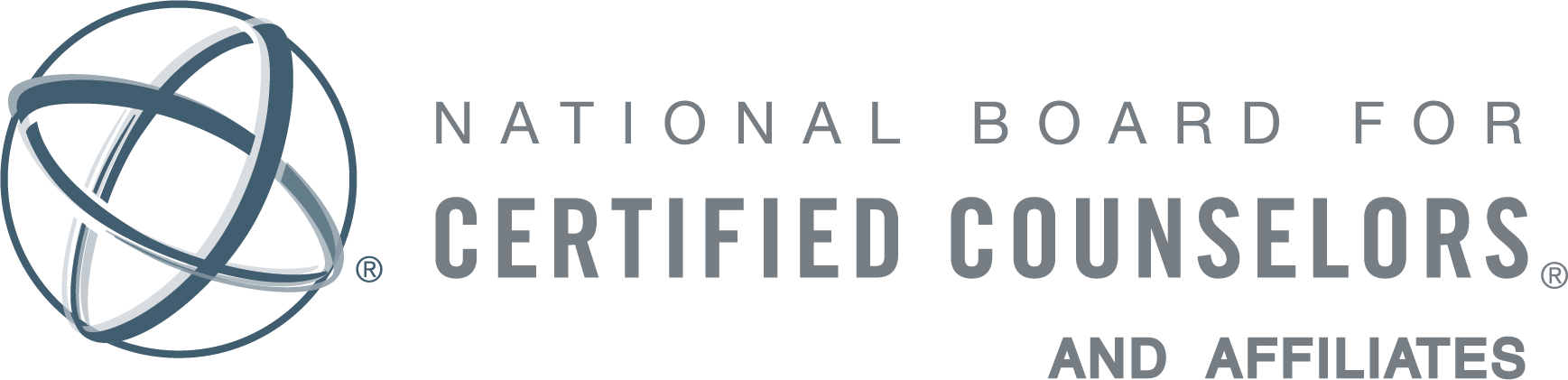
- Formation: 1982
- Headquarters: Greensboro, North Carolina, United States
- President and CEO: Kylie P. Dotson-Blake
- Website: nbcc.org

The National Board for Certified Counselors, Inc. and Affiliates (NBCC) is an international certifying organization for professional counselors in the United States. It is an independent, not-for-profit credentialing organization based in Greensboro, North Carolina. The purpose of the organization is to establish and monitor a national certification system for professional counselors, to identify certified counselors, and to maintain a register of them. NBCC also certifies Coaches through its affiliate Center for Credentialing and Education. Individuals may earn the Board Certified Coach credential through third party programs, including online programs in Life Coaching and Psychosynthesis Coaching.

NBCC has more than 66,000 certified counselors across the U.S. and in more than 40 countries. Its examinations for professional counselors are used by all 50 states, the District of Columbia and Puerto Rico to license counselors.

== History ==
In December 1979, the American Personnel and Guidance Association (APGA) Board of Directors approved a plan to create a generic counselor certification registry. In February 1982, the APGA President chose the members of the first NBCC Board, and the board’s first meeting was in April 1982. In July 1982, NBCC was incorporated as a not-for-profit entity separate from APGA. The separation ensured an unbiased certification process and an assumption of liability on the part of NBCC.

The NBCC established and now monitors a national certification system, to identify for professionals and the public those counselors who have voluntarily sought and obtained certification. Unlike other professional mental health entities such as the American Counseling Association (ACA), the American Psychological Association (APA), and the Association for Counselor Education and Supervision (ACES), NBCC does not have members. Instead, NBCC sets its own policies and procedures for national certification in professional counseling, administers the National Counselor Examination to applicants, and keeps a register of counselors who achieve certification.

Since 2001, NBCC has worked to pass legislation adding licensed professional counselors (LPC) and marriage and family therapists (MFT) to Medicare. Medicare is the largest health care program in the United States and currently recognizes psychiatrists, psychologists, clinical social workers and psychiatric nurses for outpatient mental health services, but does not reimburse LPCs or MFTs for behavioral health services. As a result, a client who sees an LPC or MFT has to immediately cease therapy at the age of 65, when the government mandates that they must leave their health insurance to enroll in Medicare. NBCC believes that this Medicare exclusion of LPCs and MFTs should be removed, because they can play an important role in a functioning mental health system by maximizing the capacity of the behavioral health workforce.

== Certifications ==
The certification program recognizes counselors who have met predetermined standards in their training, experience, and performance on the National Counselor Examination for Licensure and Certification (NCE).

=== National Certified Counselor (NCC) ===
NBCC's flagship certification is the National Certified Counselor (NCC). The NCC is a generic certification for professional counselors and does not designate a particular specialty area. Holding an NCC indicates that a counselor is nationally board certified. There are currently over 63,000 NCCs in the U.S. and many other countries.

The current requirements to become an NCC include:

- A graduate degree in counseling (or one with a major in counseling) from a regionally accredited college or university
- At least 48 semester hours of graduate-level coursework, including at least one course in each of nine specified areas, as well as at least six semester hours of supervised field experience
- At least 3,000 hours of post-master's counseling experience in an applied setting over a minimum of 24 months, 100 of which must be supervised by a qualified supervisor
- A passing score on the associated National Counselor Exam (NCE).

After January 1, 2022, NCC applicants will be required to have a degree from a counselor education program accredited by the Council for Accreditation of Counseling and Related Educational Programs (CACREP), which includes a minimum of 60 semester hours of coursework.

The NCC is the board certification for counselors. It is not required for supervised or independent practice; it identifies counselors who have voluntarily sought and met established professional standards, and who continue to fulfill requirements governing continuing education credits and certification renewal. Certification is not a substitute for state-mandated licensure. However, many states use the NCE examination as part of their licensing requirements.

=== Specialty certifications ===
In addition to the NCC, NBCC administers three specialty certifications that each have the NCC credential as a prerequisite, along with other requirements.

- Certified Clinical Mental Health Counselor (CCMHC)
- Master Addictions Counselor (MAC)
- National Certified School Counselor (NCSC)

== Affiliates and Divisions ==
Since its establishment in 1982, NBCC has expanded to include:

=== Center for Credentialing & Education (CCE) ===
Created in 1995, CCE provides practitioners and organizations with assessments, business support services, and credentialing in a variety of fields, including counseling supervision, coaching, distance counseling, and human services. CCE manages the Mental Health Facilitator (MHF) program, which educates community members and leaders in providing basic mental health care and resources to their neighbors, especially in locations where mental health care is difficult to access.

=== NBCC International (NBCC-I) ===
Created in 2003, NBCC-I's purpose is to promote the counseling profession worldwide. With a focus on cultural sensitivity and understanding, as well as public awareness of the meaning of quality in professional counseling, NBCC-I offers programs and institutes all over the world. NBCC-I also manages the international portion of the MHF program.

=== The NBCC Foundation (NBCCF) ===
Created in 2005, NBCCF uses scholarships, fellowships, and capacity-building grants to encourage counselors and counselors-in-training to pursue careers as professional counselors serving high-priority populations. Increasing access to mental health care in rural, military, and minority communities is a major focus for NBCCF.

=== The European Board for Certified Counselors (EBCC) ===
Created in 2010, EBCC is the hub for NBCC-I's work in Europe. EBCC provides support for European countries that are developing their own professional counseling efforts.

=== The Professional Counselor (TPC) ===
Published by NBCC since 2011, TPC is a peer-reviewed, open-access, academic journal. It is published online in a continuous format, and covers a wide range of topics including: mental and behavioral health counseling; school counseling; career counseling; couple, marriage, and family counseling; counseling supervision; theory development; professional counseling ethics; international counseling and multicultural issues; program applications; and integrative reviews from counseling and related fields.
