= Journal of Counseling & Development =

- Discipline: Psychotherapy, counseling, applied psychology
- Language: English
- Edited by: Spencer G. Niles

Publication details
- Former name(s): National Vocational Guidance Bulletin, Vocational Guidance Magazine, Occupations: The Vocational Guidance Journal, The Personnel and Guidance Journal
- History: 1921–present
- Publisher: Wiley-Blackwell on behalf of the American Counseling Association (United States)
- Frequency: Quarterly
- Impact factor: 0.622 (2011)

Standard abbreviations
- ISO 4: J. Couns. Dev.

Indexing
- ISSN: 0748-9633 (print); 1556-6676 (web)
- LCCN: 85647714
- OCLC no.: 11046863

Links
- Journal homepage; Online access; Online archive

The Journal of Counseling & Development is a peer-reviewed academic journal published quarterly by Wiley-Blackwell on behalf of the American Counseling Association. The journal was established in 1921 as the National Vocational Guidance Bulletin. In 1924 the titled changed to Vocational Guidance Magazine and, again, to Occupations: The Vocational Guidance Journal. In 1952 the titled became The Personnel and Guidance Journal and in 1984 the journal adapted the current name, Journal of Counseling & Development. The current editor-in-chief is Matthew E. Lemberger-Truelove (University of North Texas).

According to the Journal Citation Reports, the journal has a 2017 impact factor of 1.356, ranking it 57th out of 82 journals in the category "Psychology, Applied".
