= Adjustment (psychology) =

Adapting to conditions in social environment

In psychology, adjustment is the condition of a person who is able to adapt to changes in their physical, occupational, and social environment. In other words, adjustment refers to the behavioral process of balancing conflicting needs or needs challenged by obstacles in the environment. Due to the various changes experienced throughout life, humans and animals have to regularly learn how to adjust to their environment. Throughout their lives, individuals encounter various phases that demand continuous adjustment, from changes in career paths and evolving relationships to the physical and psychological shifts associated with aging. Each stage presents unique challenges and requires individuals to adapt in ways that support their growth and well-being. For example, when they are stimulated by their physiological state to seek food, they eat (if possible) to reduce their hunger and thus adjust to the hunger stimulus. Successful adjustment equips individuals with a fulfilling quality of life, enriching their experiences as they navigate life’s challenges.

Adjustment disorder occurs when there is an inability to make a normal adjustment to some need or stress in the environment. Those who are unable to adjust well are more likely to have clinical anxiety or depression, as well as experience feelings of hopelessness, anhedonia, difficulty concentrating, sleeping problems, and reckless behavior.

In psychology, "adjustment" can be seen in two ways: as a process and as an achievement. Adjustment as a process involves the ongoing strategies people use to cope with life changes, while adjustment as an achievement focuses on the end result—achieving a stable and balanced state. Together, these models provide insight into how individuals adapt and reach well-being.

Achieving successful adjustment offers individuals increased emotional resilience and an enriched quality of life. However, in times of high stress or significant challenges, some may resort to defense mechanisms such as denial, displacement, or rationalization to manage their emotions. These coping strategies can provide temporary relief but may also prevent individuals from fully addressing the underlying issues.

== Adjustment as an achievement ==
This model addresses adjustment at a specific moment in time, considering an individual's adjustment to one challenge, not to all the challenges they have faced. Successfully adjusting to one scenario can be independent of struggling to adjust to another unrelated scenario. An example of this type of approach is observing a poor student beginning to study during recess because they do not have a home environment where they can effectively study. Beginning to study at another time would be considered adequately adjusting to this scenario, but does not consider the other ways it may impact their life (i.e.: inhibiting social interactions with peers.)

== Adjustment as a process ==
The 'adjustment as a process' theory portrays that, since the moment we are born, humans are in a constant state of adjustment. Since we exist in a state of constant, oftentimes rapid change, it follows that we cannot break these changes down into separate, unrelated challenges. This method of consideration asserts there is no way to 'adjust successfully' because something will always be about to change and prompt further adjustment. This approach views all life events as inextricable from some form of adjustment.

The two primary processes that contribute to adjustment process are assimilation and accommodation. Assimilation involves integrating new experiences and information into existing mental frameworks. Accommodation requires altering those frameworks to adapt to new situations. Together, these processes support healthy adjustment, which is the individual’s ongoing ability to meet personal, social, and biological needs effectively. Through this balance, individuals establish a sense of stability and harmony, enabling them to respond flexibly to life’s challenges while maintaining a well-rounded sense of well-being.

== Successful adjustment ==
Successful adjustment is also called being 'well adjusted' and is critical to mental health. Colloquially, being well-adjusted is defined as a person who "is reasonable and has good judgement...their behavior is not difficult or strange." Adjustment is a continuum, not a simple dichotomy; people can fluctuate and be adept at adjusting in different circumstances.

=== Coping ===
Successful adjustment can also be determined by the ability of the individual to address the core problem and employ coping strategies to help individuals adjust to a changing environment. Coping is known as the conscious effort to implore strategies to manage, reduce, or adapt to the challenges and pressures posed by stress. It encompasses a variety of approaches aimed at mitigating the impact of stressors, allowing individuals to maintain emotional balance and regain a sense of control over their circumstances. These strategies can be problem-focused, targeting the source of stress, or emotion-focused, aimed at managing emotional responses to stress.

Two major coping strategies are problem-focused coping and emotion-focused coping. Problem-focused coping involves directly addressing the source of stress. This strategy is typically action-oriented, where individuals actively take steps to eliminate, reduce, or resolve the stressor. Emotion-focused coping, on the other hand, aims to manage the emotional responses associated with stress rather than the problem itself. Techniques like meditation, talking with friends, journaling, or engaging in relaxing activities are common examples. Both strategies are essential and can be used in tandem, depending on whether a person can change the stressor directly or simply needs to adapt to it emotionally.

=== Characteristics of a well-adjusted person ===
In general, a person that is well-adjusted will have the following characteristics:

- An understanding of personal strengths and weaknesses and a tendency to play up strengths while limiting the appearance of weaknesses
- Personal respect and appreciation, a well-adjusted individual finds themselves to be inherently valuable
- Appropriate aspirations that require hard work and capitalizing on strengths without being too far out of reach and setting them up for failure
- Basic needs such as food, water, shelter, and sleep are consistently met, as well as a general feeling of security and positive self-esteem
- Positive attitude and a tendency to find the goodness in other people, objects, and activities. A well-adjusted person will acknowledge others' weaknesses but not actively search for faults.
- Flexibility to respond to and accommodate for changes in the environment
- Ability to handle adverse circumstances: well-adjusted people are able to take negative life events in stride; they will be motivated to take action to remedy the problem rather than passively accept it
- A realistic perception of the world that allows for a healthy amount of distrust of others and encourages pragmatic thinking
- A feeling of ease within surrounding environments. A well-adjusted person feels comfortable in different aspects of their community, such as home, school, work, neighborhood, religious organization, etc.
- A balanced life philosophy that accounts for and acknowledges the impact that the world has on an individual, as well as the impact an individual can have on the world

These more detailed characteristics listed above can be synthesized into these main criteria:

- ability to adequately function
- ability to perform adaptive tasks
- high positive affect and low negative affect
- general satisfaction in various life domains
- absence of debilitating psychological disorders

An individual who does not have these characteristics or is not consistently meeting the listed criteria could be diagnosed with an Adjustment disorder. If diagnosed, they would likely be treated with psychotherapy to help them develop these skills and abilities. Ways to encourage these healthy adjustment mechanisms may include:

- encouraging talking about and processing emotions
- understanding and offering support, especially during periods of transition
- reassuring them that they are normal and worthy of inclusion
- monitoring progress in different environments (i.e.: home and school)
- emphasizing decision making, especially starting out with simple, relatively inconsequential decisions (i.e.: what to eat for breakfast, what toy to play with)
- promoting participation in hobbies and activities that are enjoyable and play to their individual strengths

== Defense Mechanisms ==
Many methods used for adjustment are also defense mechanisms. Defense mechanisms can be either adaptive or maladaptive depending on the context and the use. In a 2003 study, researchers found that elementary school children who utilized appropriate defense mechanisms had higher performance in academic, social, conduct, and athletic domains.

Defense mechanisms can buffer certain feelings regarding difficult situations by reducing the immediate impact of stressors. When faced with intense emotions or threats to self-esteem, defense mechanisms can temporarily shield individuals, allowing them to navigate distressing events without feeling completely overwhelmed, helping them adjust for a period.

=== Examples of Defense Mechanisms ===
==== Day Dreaming ====
- Daydreams are brief detachments from reality while awake. Episodes generally include fantasizing about hopes for the future and other pleasant thoughts.
- Adaptive example: daydreaming about positive social interactions could reduce social anxiety
- In a 2016 study, researchers studied 103 students as they transitioned to university. They found that those who daydreamed more frequently and whose daydreams had higher rates of positive characteristics and positive emotional outcomes were less likely to feel lonely by the end of the study. Participants' daydreams fostered feelings of connection and social inclusion during an anxiety-ridden period. Findings from this study suggest that daydreaming can help individuals with socio-emotional adjustment.

==== Displacement ====
- Displacement is a defense mechanism where an individual redirects emotions or impulses from an original, threatening source to a safer or more acceptable substitute. This can help temporarily reduce anxiety by shifting difficult feelings onto less risky targets.
- Adaptive example: feeling frustrated at work after a difficult interaction with their supervisor. Instead of confronting the supervisor directly, they might channel their frustration into a productive activity, like exercising or tackling a challenging project at home.

==== Denial ====
- Denial is a defense mechanism where an individual refuses to accept reality or acknowledge a distressing aspect of their life. This subconscious strategy allows the person to avoid facing painful feelings or situations temporarily, helping them cope with overwhelming emotions in the short term.
- Adaptive example: someone who has been diagnosed with a chronic illness denies the severity of the diagnosis.

===== Additional Examples =====
- Compensation: emphasizing a strength to diminish the appearance of a real or imagined weakness
  - Adaptive example: developing strong interpersonal skills to compensate for difficulty with academics
- Intellectualization: focusing on the abstract side of something as opposed to the practical or emotional sides
  - Adaptive example: researching a disease after being diagnosed rather than contemplating the life changing impact
- Rationalization: understanding the reasoning behind actions; often touted as "making excuses" but can be adaptive
  - Adaptive example: knowing that you need to be stern and harsh to a friend in order to tell them the truth and help them improve
- Identification: associating oneself with another individual (often a friend or relative) that is extremely accomplished
  - Adaptive example: associating with the success of sibling when you have helped them achieve a goal
- Projection: displacing personal feelings/opinions as those of another person (consciously or unconsciously)
  - Adaptive example: mitigating personal guilt by saying a friend has anger issues rather than acknowledging your internal anger

== See also ==
- Adjustment disorder
- Psychological adaptation
- Emotional well-being
