= Dual relationship =

Concept in mental health ethics

In the mental health field, a dual relationship is a situation where multiple roles exist between a therapist, or other mental health practitioner, and a client. Dual relationships are also referred to as multiple relationships, and these two terms are used interchangeably in the research literature. The American Psychological Association (APA) Ethical Principles of Psychologists and Code of Conduct (also referred to as the APA ethics code) is a resource that outlines ethical standards and principles to which practitioners are expected to adhere. Standard 3.05 of the APA ethics code outlines the definition of multiple relationships. Dual or multiple relationships occur when:

- a professional and personal relationship take place simultaneously between the psychologist and the client
- the psychologist has a relationship with a person closely related to or connected to their client
- the psychologist has intentions to enter into a future relationship with the client or someone closely related to the client

In addition, the standard provides a description of when to avoid multiple relationships (e.g., when the relationship causes harm to the client or impairs the psychologist's competence) and when these relationships are not considered unethical (e.g., when the relationship does not exploit the client or impair competence).

== In other fields ==
Several "helping" fields which are not strictly psychological in nature, but which still involve a therapeutic counseling environment, also have stringent policies involving dual relationships and the avoidance of such relationships. For example, the National Association of Social Workers [NASW], which regulates 132,000 social workers across the world, names multiple types of dual relationships. This includes sexual, financial, personal or religious relationships which could become exploitative due to the differences in power between the worker and the client. Social workers are advised by the NASW to communicate with their clients when such a relationship arises or could arise, and are advised to take steps to avoid dual relationships wherever possible. The NASW recognizes, however, that dual relationships can be unavoidable in some types of communities, such as in rural communities or military installations.
