= American Mental Health Counselors Association =

- Abbreviation: AMHCA
- Formation: May 1976
- Founders: Jim Messina, Nancy Spisso
- Type: Professional organization
- Professional title: Diplomate and Clinical Mental Health Specialist (DCMHS)
- Headquarters: Alexandria, Virginia
- Services: Licensing, education, and ethics standards for mental health counselors
- Members: ~7,000 (2015)
- Website: www.amhca.org

The American Mental Health Counselors Association (abbreviated AMHCA) is an organization of licensed mental health counselors in the United States. Its activities include setting and enforcing standards for education, licensing, and ethics for American mental health counselors. It also publishes the Journal of Mental Health Counseling (formerly the American Mental Health Counselors Association Journal).

== History ==
The American Mental Health Counselors Association was founded in 1976 by Jim Messina and Nancy Spisso of the Escambia County Mental Health Center in Florida. At the time, mental health counselors lacked a clearly defined identity or an organization to represent their distinctive interests.

The American Mental Health Counselors Association became a division of the American Personnel and Guidance Association (now the American Counseling Association) in 1978. Before separating from the ACA in 2019, the AMHCA was one of the American Counseling Association's largest divisions.

== Recognition ==
The American Counseling Association's Encyclopedia of Counseling credits the AMHCA's activities with significantly impacting "...the development of mental health counseling as a distinct and nationally recognized profession on several levels."

== Membership ==
In 1987, the AMHCA had about 12,000 members, and as of 2015, its membership was just under 7,000. To become a member of the AMHCA, it is necessary to follow the organization's clinical practice standards, and to have a master's degree in counseling or a related field.

== See also ==
- Institute for the Psychological Sciences
