= Council for Accreditation of Counseling and Related Educational Programs =

Council for Accreditation of Counseling & Related Educational Programs
- Abbreviation: CACREP
- Formation: 1981
- Type: United States higher education programmatic accreditor
- Headquarters: Alexandria, Virginia, U.S.
- Chair: Sonja Sutherland
- President and CEO: Sylvia Fernandez
- Website: www.cacrep.org

The Council for Accreditation of Counseling & Related Educational Programs (CACREP) is a programmatic accreditor of counseling education programs at colleges and universities in the United States. It is recognized by the Council for Higher Education Accreditation (CHEA).

== History ==
The Council was established in 1981 in order to set standards for counselor training. The first national conference was held from 7 to 10 October 1988 in St. Louis. The Association for Counselor Education and Supervision (ACES) and the American Personnel and Guidance Association (a precursor to the American Counselor Association) discussed cooperative accreditation efforts for counseling programs. This ultimately led to CACREP's establishment.

CACREP serves as one of the four major entities of the counseling profession in the United States; the other three entities are the American Counseling Association, the National Board of Certified Counselors, and the American Mental Health Counselors Association.

== Accreditation ==
CACREP accredits both master's and doctoral degree counseling programs. Current types of programs that can be accredited are:

Master's degree programs

- Addiction Counseling
- Career Counseling
- Clinical Mental Health Counseling
- Clinical Rehabilitation Counseling
- College Counseling and Student Affairs
- Marriage, Couple and Family Counseling
- Rehabilitation Counseling
- School Counseling

Doctoral degree programs

- Counselor Education and Supervision

Accreditation can no longer be sought for programs under the following titles:

- Community Counseling
- College Counseling
- Gerontological Counseling
- Marriage & Family Therapy
- Mental Health Counseling
- Student Affairs
- Student Affairs and College Counseling

== See also ==
- List of recognized accreditation associations of higher learning
