= Mental health counselor =

Professional providing mental health support

A mental health counselor (MHC), often simply counselor (counsellor in British English), is a person who works with individuals and groups to promote optimum mental and emotional health. Such persons may help individuals deal with issues associated with addiction and substance abuse; family, parenting, and marital problems; stress management; self-esteem; and aging. The United States Bureau of Labor Statistics distinguishes "Mental Health Counselors" from "Social Workers", "Psychiatrists", and "Psychologists".

== Duties ==
The legal definition of a counselor varies due to the different specializations within counseling. In their own jurisdictions, there are counselors, marriage and family therapists, and psychologists. In spite of such definitions, many mental health professionals reject the medical model (which assumes that clients are "disordered") in favor of broader viewpoints, such as those that emerged from systems psychology.

== Service users ==
MHCs work with individuals, couples, families, and groups to address and treat emotional and mental disorders and to promote mental health. Most mental health counselors in the U.S. work in outpatient and residential care centers, individual and family services, and local governments. They are trained in a variety of therapeutic techniques used to address issues, including depression, anxiety, addiction and substance abuse, suicidal impulses, stress, problems with self-esteem, and grief. They also help with job and career concerns, educational decisions, issues related to mental and emotional health, and family, parenting, marital, or other relationship problems. Some career concerns include helping employees who have mental health conditions to manage their health condition whilst adhering to organizational demands to demonstrate performance and commitment to their work.

MHCs also continue to play a growing role in the military mental health crisis, helping military personnel and their families deal with issues such as PTSD. MHCs often work closely with other mental health specialists, such as psychiatrists, psychologists, clinical social workers, psychiatric nurses, and school counselors. Many mental health counselors look to help their clients have a concise whole body treatment plan that addresses all the needs of the client. In the United States, MHCs diagnose as well as treat mental illness, though the scope of practice for mental health practitioners varies from state to state.

There are some mental health counselors who are able to prescribe medication. There are psychiatrists and mental health practitioners. Recently, there have been a few states that have allowed licensed psychologists with additional training to be able to prescribe. And there is a recent motion that is allowing interstate practice, meaning that counselors can use their license in other states than the one they received their license in.

== Regulation ==
=== United States ===
Licensing requirements can vary depending on which state a mental health counselor practices in. Across the United States, mental health counseling licensure is required to independently practice, but can be practiced without a license if under close supervision of a licensed practitioner. Licensing titles for mental health counselors vary from state to state: Licensed Mental Health Counselor (LMHC), Licensed Professional Counselor (LPC), Licensed Professional Clinical Counselor (LPCC), and various forms of these titles may list differently per state statues. The title "Mental Health Counselor" (or variation thereof) is often a protected title and thus it may be a violation of state law for persons to hold themselves as such without a proper credential.

A licensed mental health counselor holds a minimum of a master's degree in counseling or another closely related field in mental health care. After obtaining a master's degree, mental health counselors complete two to three years (depending on various state statutes) of clinical work under the supervision of a licensed or certified mental health professional. The qualifications for licensure are similar to those for marriage and family therapists and for clinical social workers. Becoming a counselor and using it in daily life to help others to learn more about themselves is not a reason for someone to pursue a degree within this field. Ethics within this profession require the counselor to remain professional to be able to adequately treat patients. Remaining detached as the witness to a client's thought, feelings, and emotions can be a hard thing to do, but will ultimately reassure a patient that there are no judgement to what they will share. Guiding a patient to understand themselves and their choices is also another aspect of this profession.

== See also ==
- List of counseling topics
- Mental health professional
- Psychotherapist
- Nonviolent communication
- Social worker
- Psychologist
- Psychiatrist
- Occupational therapist
- Expressive therapy
- Behavior therapy
- Cognitive behavioral therapy
- Rational emotive behavior therapy
- Dialectical behavioral therapy
