= American Counseling Association =

Member organization of professional counselors

- Abbreviation: ACA
- Formation: 1952
- Type: Nonprofit, Professional Society
- Purpose: Advancing the counseling profession, mental health and well-being through education, advocacy, community, inclusion and research.
- Headquarters: Alexandria, Virginia
- Members: 60,000
- President: Elsa Soto Leggett
- Publication: Counseling Today
- Website: www.counseling.org

The American Counseling Association (ACA) is a membership organization representing licensed professional counselors (LPCs), counseling students, and other counseling professionals in the United States. It is the world's largest association exclusively representing professional counselors.

Its stated mission is to "enhance the quality of life in society by promoting the development of professional counselors, advancing the counseling profession, and using the profession and practice of counseling to promote respect for human dignity and diversity".

The association's headquarters are located in Alexandria, Virginia.

== History ==
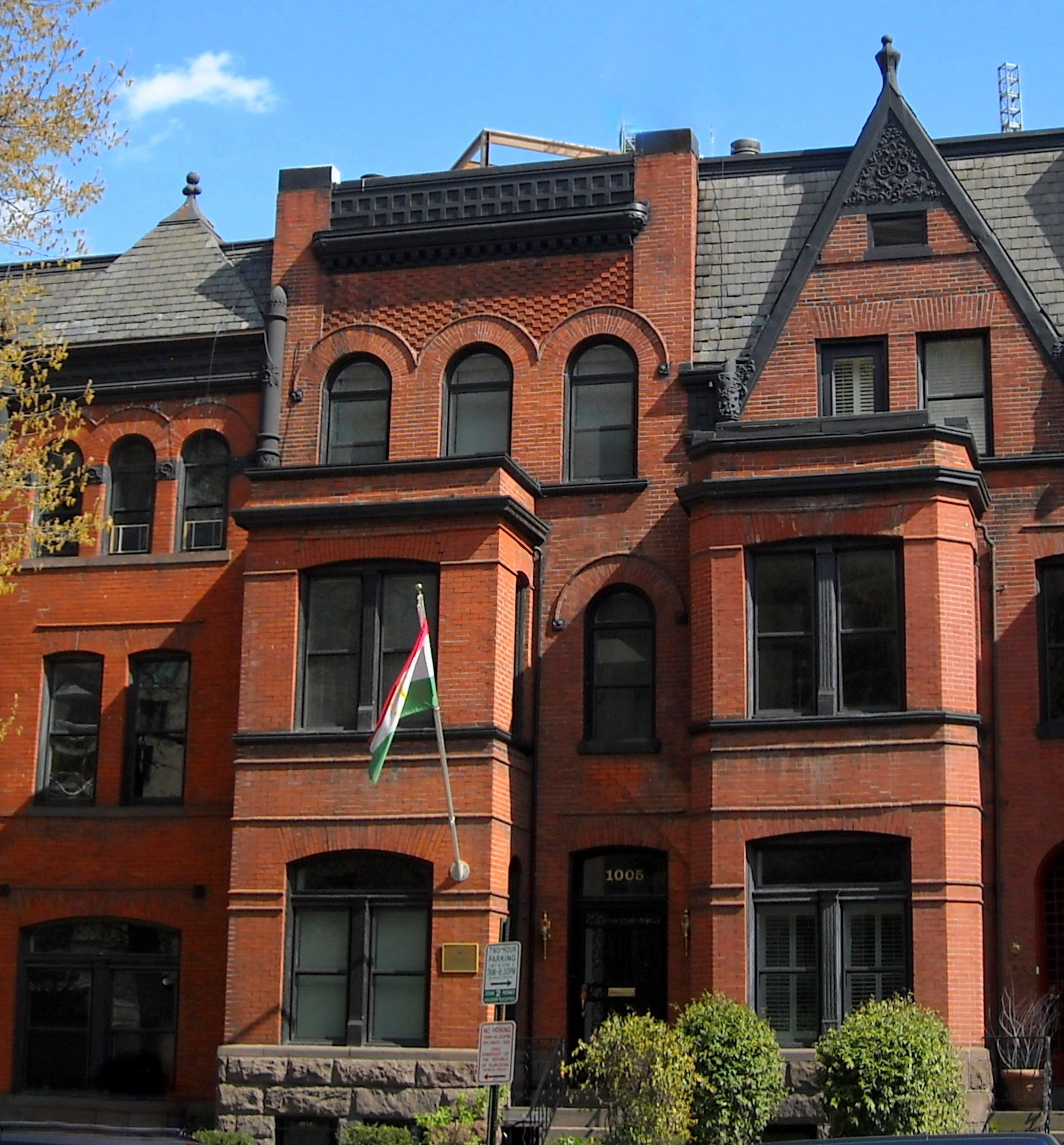
Former headquarters of the American Personnel and Guidance Association in Washington, D.C.

The group was founded in 1952 as the American Personnel and Guidance Association (APGA), formed by the merger of the National Vocational Guidance Association (NVGA), the National Association of Guidance and Counselor Trainers (NAGCT), the Student Personnel Association for Teacher Education (SPATE), and the American College Personnel Association (ACPA). The American Personnel and Guidance Association changed its name to the American Association of Counseling and Development (AACD) in 1983.

On July 1, 1992, the association adopted its current name.

=== Divisions, regions and branches ===
There are 20 chartered divisions within the American Counseling Association. They are listed here with their founding date:

- Association for Adult Development and Aging (AADA) (1986)
- Association for Assessment and Research in Counseling (AARC) (1965)
- Association for Child and Adolescent Counseling (ACAC) (2010)
- Association for Creativity in Counseling (ACC) (2004)
- American College Counseling Association (ACCA) (1991)
- Association for Counselor Education and Supervision (ACES) (1940)
- Association for Humanistic Counseling (AHC) (1931)
- Association for Multicultural Counseling and Development (AMCD) (1972)
- American Rehabilitation Counseling Association (ARCA) (1958)
- Association for Spiritual, Ethical, and Religious Values in Counseling (ASERVIC) (1974)
- Association for Specialists in Group Work (ASGW) (1973)
- Counselors for Social Justice (CSJ) (1999)
- International Association for Resilience and Trauma Counseling (IARTC) (2021)
- International Association of Addictions and Offender Counselors (IAAOC) (1972)
- International Association of Marriage and Family Counselors (IAMFC) (1989)
- Military and Government Counseling Association (MGCA) (1984)
- National Career Development Association (NCDA) (1913)
- National Employment Counseling Association (NECA) (1966)
- Society for Sexual, Affectional, Intersex, and Gender Expansive Identities (SAIGE) (1975)
- Affiliate: Association of Counseling Sexology and Sexual Wellness (ACSSW) (in or before 2018)

The ACA also has multi-state regional bodies, and branches for various US states and territories. There is also a "Europe" branch.

=== Publications ===
ACA publishes books, journals and other educational materials on counseling topics including Journal of Counseling & Development. The organization's flagship magazine, Counseling Today, is published once a month and sent to all ACA members via U.S. mail.

=== 2017 conference ===
In 2016, ACA moved its 2017 San Francisco Conference & Expo from Nashville, Tennessee to San Francisco, California after Tennessee's legislature passed a bill, HB 1840/SB 1556, targeting members of the LGBTQ community and others. The bill allowed counselors in Tennessee to turn clients away based on "strongly held principles". The ACA stated that the legislation "denies services to those most in need, targets the counseling profession, and violates the ACA's code of ethics".
