= Zaheer (name) =

Zaheer (ظہیر) is an Urdu male given name and surname, a variant of Arabic Zahir. Notable people with the name include:

== Given name ==
- Zaheer Abbas (born 1947), Pakistani cricketer
- Ajmal Zaheer Ahmad, American film director, writer and producer
- Zaheer Ahmad (1948–2011), Pakistani American medical doctor, chief executive of the Shifa International Hospital, Islamabad
- Zaheer Ali (born 1981), Trinidadian cricketer
- Zaheer-ul-Islam (born 1956), former Director-General of Pakistan's Inter-Services Intelligence (ISI)
- Anwar Zaheer Jamali (born 1951), Pakistani jurist, 24th Chief Justice of Pakistan
- Zaheer Khan (born 1978), Indian cricketer
- Zaheer Khan (Pakistani cricketer) (born 1979), Pakistani cricketer
- Zaheer Maqsood (born 1985), Emirati cricketer
- Zaheer Mohamed (born 1985), Guyanese cricketer
- Syed Zaheer Rizvi (born 1968), Pakistani music director and teacher
- Zaheer Sher (born 1975), English cricketer

== Surname ==
- Ehsan Elahi Zaheer (1945–1987), Pakistani Islamic theologian, leader of the Ahl-i Hadith movement
- Omar Zaheer (born 1990), contestant on season 42 of Survivor
- S. M. Zaheer (born 1947), Indian actor
- Sajjad Zaheer (1905–1973), Urdu writer, Marxist ideologue and radical revolutionary in both India and Pakistan
- Syed Ali Zaheer (1896–1983), Indian politician and a minister in the first cabinet formed by Prime Minister Jawaharlal Nehru
- Syed Husain Zaheer (1901–1975), Indian chemist, politician, director general of the Council of Scientific and Industrial Research (CSIR)
- Syed Iqbal Zaheer (born 1944), Indian Islamic scholar and writer
- Zafar Zaheer (born 1974), Bahraini cricketer

== See also ==
- Zaheer (The Legend of Korra), major recurring character in Nickelodeon's animated television series The Legend of Korra
- Dr. S. Hussain Zaheer Memorial High School
- Zaheera
- Zahir (disambiguation)
