= Bill Copeland =

Bill Copeland may refer to:

- Bill Copeland (umpire) (1929–2011), Australian Test cricket match umpire
- Bill Copeland (poet) (1946–2010), American poet, writer and historian
- Bill Copeland (sailor) (1928–2017), Canadian sailor
