= Steven L. West =

American research scientist and rehabilitation counselor

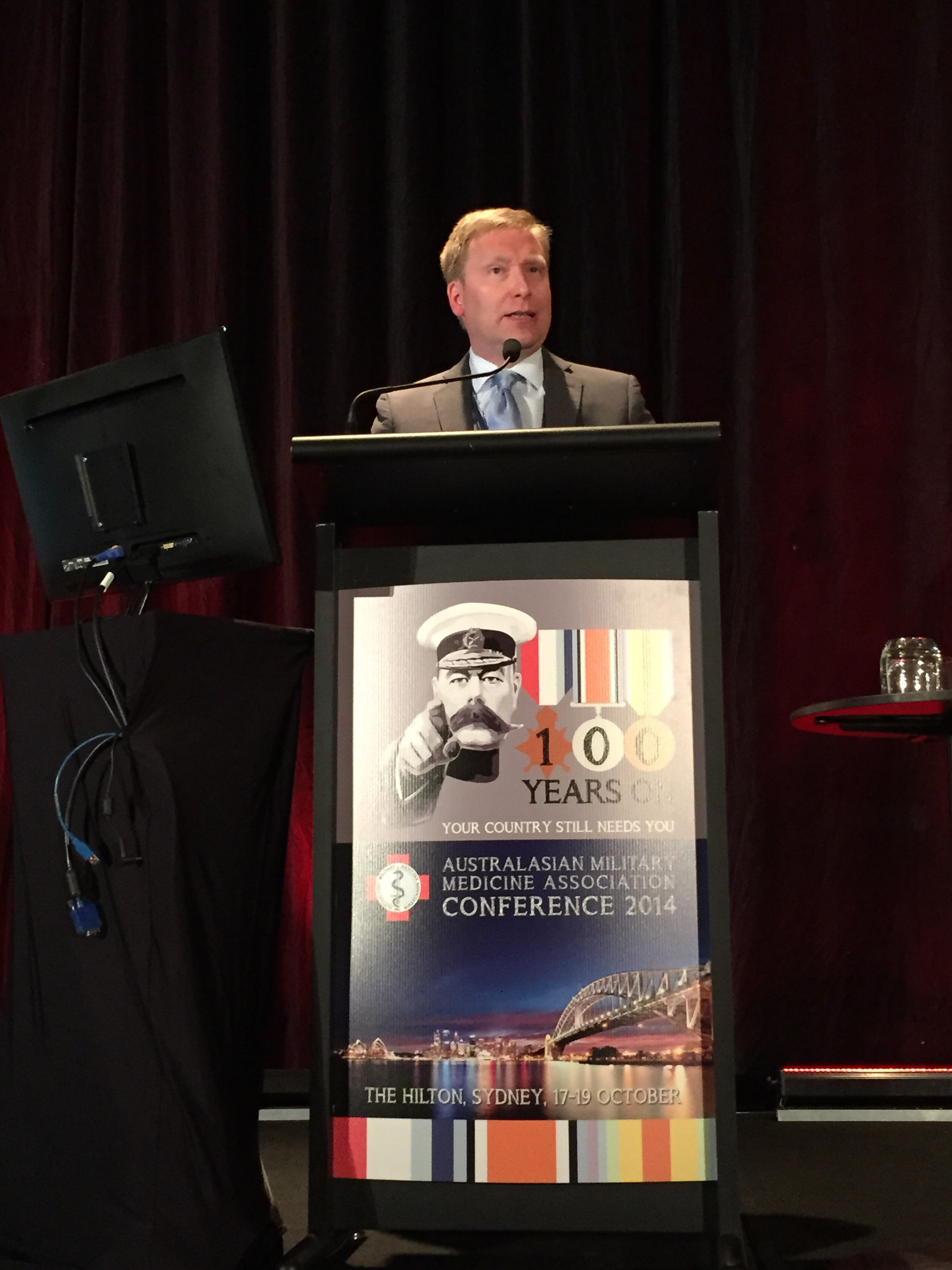
- Citizenship: American
- Education: University of Tennessee (BA, MS); Austin Peay State University (MS); Texas Tech University (PhD)
- Years active: Late 1990s to Present
- Employer: University of Memphis
- Known for: Physical Medicine and Rehabilitation research

Steven L. West is an American research scientist and rehabilitation counselor specializing in addictions issues among persons with disabilities. He is a Professor in the Department of Counseling, Educational Psychology and Research at the University of Memphis in Memphis, TN.

== Education ==
He trained as a rehabilitation counselor at the University of Tennessee where his mentor was James H. Miller, a noted rehabilitation counselor and rehabilitation educator. At UT West began his initial research into addictions issues and people with disabilities. He later completed his doctoral studies at the Texas Tech University under the mentorship of Dr. Alan Reifman.

== Professional service ==
As an advocate for persons with disabilities, he served as a member of the Virginia Department of Rehabilitative Services' Human Research Review Committee In 2014, West began serving a five-year term as a member of the board of directors of the Commission on Rehabilitation Counselor Certification, the national certifying organization for professional rehabilitation counselors; he is Past President of the Board. He is a past member of the Board of Directors and Board Treasurer of the National Commission on Certification of Physician Assistants (NCCPA) Foundation, a 501c(3) charitable nonprofit organization that designs solutions for improving the capacity of certified PAs to impact quality and accessibility of health care delivery. In 2026, he joined the Board of Directors of the Board of Pharmacy Specialties, the division of the American Pharmacists Association (APhA) which serves as the certifying entity for Board Certified Pharmacists.

== Research ==
=== Addiction Issues Among Persons with Disabilities ===
West is a leading scholar on substance abuse treatment access for persons with disabilities (PWDs). Along with colleagues at Virginia Commonwealth University, West pioneered the self-report assessment of the impact of access barriers to substance abuse treatment in two studies considering persons spinal cord injury, or SCI, and a number of other disabilities. In the first of these efforts, service denials based on physical inaccessibility to individuals with SCI and traumatic brain injury (TBI), were explored in a sample of 144 substance abuse treatment providers in the Mid-Atlantic region. Self-report surveys to these counselors asked about the number of individuals with these two types of disabilities who sought but who were denied services due to the presence of physical barriers in the respondent's treatment location. Although the number of individuals with these types of disabilities who presented for treatment was relatively small, the percentage of denials was notable. In sum, 55% of individuals with SCI and 42% of individuals with TBI who presented for treatment were declined services due to physical barriers in the respondents’ treatment locations. The denial of services based on physical barriers was not related to practice affiliation (private or public) or practice type (outpatient, non-medical residential, or hospital-based).

He extended these findings by assessing treatment denials experienced by individuals with a variety of disabilities including persons with multiple sclerosis (MS), muscular dystrophy (MD), non-paralytic mobility impairment, SCI, and TBI. As in their first treatment denial study, West and colleagues mailed surveys to licensed treatment professionals (n = 200), this time in a single state, asking about the number of individuals with one of the target disabilities who sought but were denied services due to barriers in the respondent’s treatment location. A total of 800 individuals with one of the target disabilities sought treatment from these providers, of whom 527 (66%) were denied care due to the presence of barriers. Denial rates across all disability groups were: 87% for MS, 75% for MD, 65% for non-paralytic mobility impairments, 67% for SCI, and 68% for TBI. Alternately, when viewed from the perspective of treatment providers, generally high rates of service denials were also evidenced. A total of 51 respondents were approached by someone with TBI seeking services; 37 of these respondents (73%) declined services to at least one such individual. Overall denial rates from this perspective ranged from a low of 67% for individuals with MD to a high of 91% for those with MS, with an overall denial rate of 72%. West and his colleagues conducted the first such evaluation of treatment denials in the United Kingdom and found denial rates based on disability status to be equal to or greater than those found in U.S. substance abuse treatment facilities.

West has also been instrumental in developing a body of research to indicate that the number of barriers to access in substance abuse treatment facilities is numerous. In a national self-report survey of treatment centers in the United States, he and his colleagues found rates of access barriers to be commonplace. 33 Using a self-report survey, respondents were queried not only about the physical accessibility of their facilities, but also about the programmatic accessibility of their services. Substantial numbers of barriers to physical access were found. Some 20% of respondents reported that they did not have accessible restrooms, about 25% did not have accessible entrances, and 26% of residential centers did not have accessible bathing facilities. The vast majority (84%) of all facilities did not have anyone on staff that could use American Sign Language (ASL) or signed English. Similarly, most (95%) could not produce materials in Braille, nor did the majority maintain Braille or other accessible format materials (88%). The respondents also overwhelmingly acknowledged that they were uncertain as to how to obtain interpreter services or alternate format materials. He and his colleagues replicated such findings with samples of treatment providers in Great Britain and Canada as well.

He was awarded the Young Investigator Award by the American Society of Addiction Medicine in 2005.
