= Nastaran =

Nastaran is a given name. Notable people with the name include:

- Nastaran Makaremi (born 1978), Iranian writer, journalist, and documentary filmmaker
- Nastaran Mohseni (born 1992), Iranian film director and cartoonist
- Nastaran Zahir, American bioengineer
