= Lindsey A. Criswell =

American physician

Lindsey Criswell
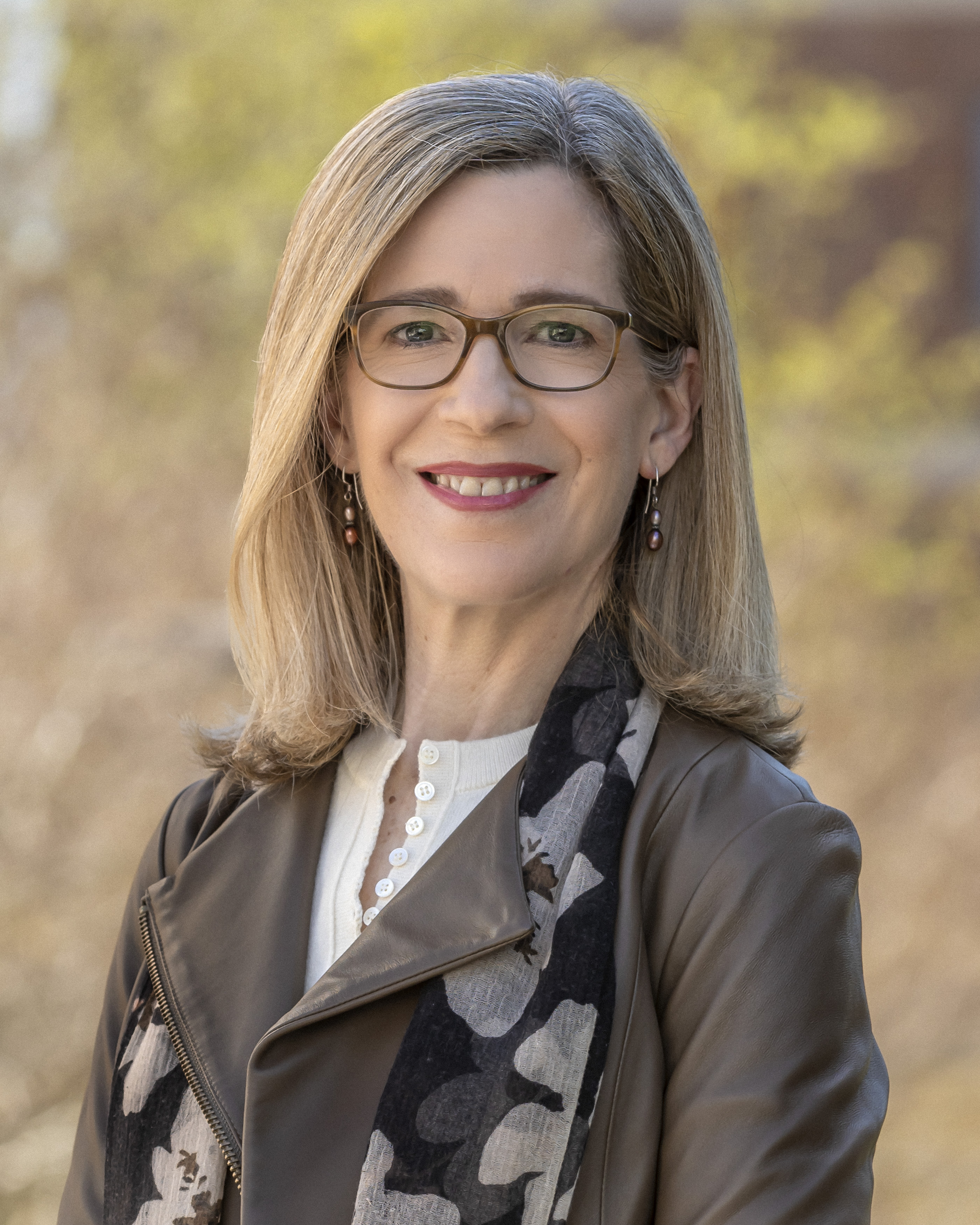

Director of the National Institute of Arthritis and Musculoskeletal and Skin Diseases
- Incumbent
- Assumed office 2021
- Deputy: Robert H. Carter
- Preceded by: Stephen I. Katz

Personal details
- Education: University of California, Berkeley (BS, MPH); Netherlands Institute for Health Sciences (DSc); University of California, San Francisco (MD)

Lindsey A. Criswell is an American rheumatologist and physician-scientist. She is director of the National Institute of Arthritis and Musculoskeletal and Skin Diseases. Criswell was vice chancellor of research at University of California, San Francisco where she held the Jean S. Engleman Distinguished Professorship in Rheumatology.

== Education ==
Criswell earned a bachelor’s degree in genetics and a master’s degree in public health from the University of California, Berkeley; a D.Sc. in genetic epidemiology from the Netherlands Institute for Health Sciences; and a M.D. from University of California, San Francisco. Criswell completed a residency in internal medicine and a fellowship in rheumatology. She is certified as a first responder in wilderness medicine.

== Career ==
Criswell is a rheumatologist. She was vice chancellor of research at the University of California, San Francisco (UCSF). Criswell was the Kenneth H. Fye, M.D., endowed chair in rheumatology, professor of orofacial sciences in the school of dentistry and held the Jean S. Engleman Distinguished Professorship in Rheumatology. Starting in 1994, Criswell was a principal investigator on multiple NIH grants and published more than 250 peer-reviewed journal papers. Her research focused on the genetics and epidemiology of human autoimmune disease, particularly rheumatoid arthritis and systemic lupus erythematosus. Using genome-wide association and other genetic studies, her research team contributed to the identification of more than 30 genes linked to these disorders. Criswell won a Henry Kunkel Young Investigator Award from the American College of Rheumatology. She also received UCSF’s 2014 Resident Clinical and Translational Research Mentor of the Year.

In early 2021, Criswell succeeded Stephen I. Katz as director of NIAMS. Criswell has many duties and ambitions in this position like managing the annual budget, pioneering research, and making information available to researchers. In 2021, she was elected to the Association of American Physicians. Criswell was elected to the National Academy of Medicine in 2024.
