= Robert H. Carter (rheumatologist) =

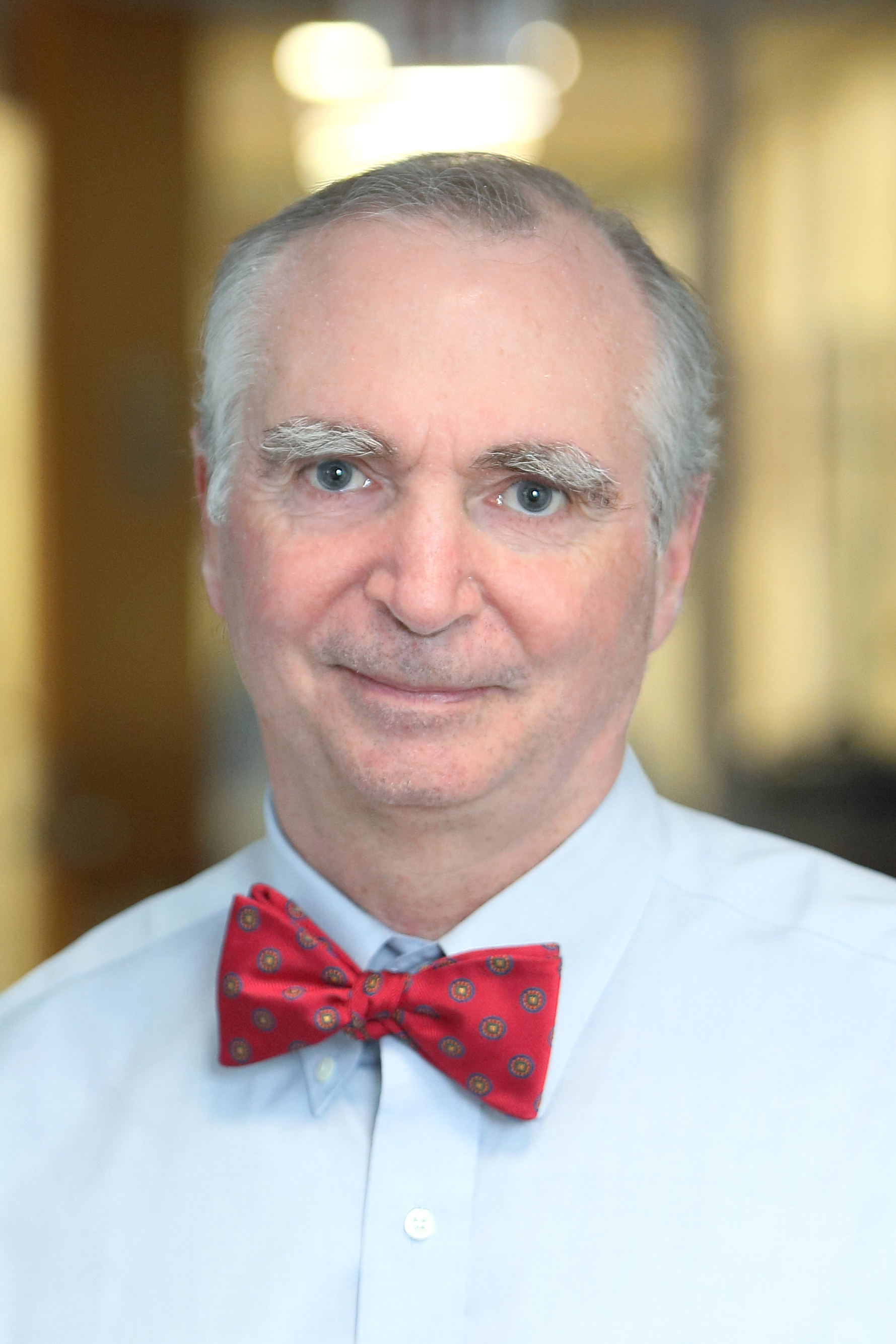
- Carter in 2019

Director of the National Institute of Arthritis and Musculoskeletal and Skin Diseases
- Acting
- In office December 2018 – February 2021
- Preceded by: Stephen I. Katz
- Succeeded by: Lindsey A. Criswell

Personal details
- Education: Williams College; Harvard Medical School
- Occupation: Rheumatologist, physician-scientist

Robert H. Carter is an American rheumatologist and physician-scientist serving as the deputy director of the National Institute of Arthritis and Musculoskeletal and Skin Diseases (NIAMS) since 2008. He was the acting director of NIAMS from December 2018 until February 2021.

== Life ==
In 1978, Carter completed a bachelor’s degree in biology from Williams College, magna cum laude. He received his M.D. from the Harvard Medical School in 1982. He trained in internal medicine at the University of Virginia Health Sciences Center. He was a fellow in rheumatology and immunology at Brigham and Women’s Hospital, and in molecular and clinical rheumatology at the Johns Hopkins School of Medicine. He is board certified in internal medicine and rheumatology.

Carter was professor of medicine at the University of Alabama at Birmingham (UAB) and served as director of the division of clinical immunology and rheumatology. He was the principal investigator (PI) of the National Institute of Arthritis and Musculoskeletal and Skin Diseases (NIAMS)-supported UAB Rheumatic Disease Core Center and the PI of an Autoimmunity Center of Excellence supported by the National Institute of Allergy and Infectious Disease (NIAID). He also served as staff physician at the Birmingham Veterans Affairs Medical Center.

Carter became deputy director of NIAMS in 2008. He leads the Accelerating Medicines Partnership in Rheumatoid Arthritis and Lupus, a public-private partnership between government, industry, advocacy organizations and academic centers focused on tissues with active disease from patients. Carter led the development of the back pain consortium as part of National Institutes of Health's Helping to End Addiction Long-term® (HEAL) Initiative. Following the death of NIAMS director Stephen I. Katz, Carter was named acting director in December 2018. He served in that role until rheumatologist Lindsey A. Criswell succeeded him in February 2021.
