= Dahir =

Dahir may refer to:

== People ==
- Dahir Mohammed (1973-2024), Ethiopian-born American soccer player
- Dahir Riyale Kahin (born 1952), the third president of the self-declared Republic of Somaliland
- Raja Dahir (661-712), last Hindu ruler of Sindh and parts of Punjab in modern-day Pakistan

== Places ==
- Dahir, Fujairah, a settlement in Fujairah, United Arab Emirates

== Other ==
- Berber Dahir, a decree created by the French protectorate in Morocco on May 16, 1930
- Moroccan Dahir, a decree by the King of Morocco

== See also ==
- Dheer (surname), Indian surname
- Zahir (disambiguation)
