= Zahir =

Zahir (Arabic: ظاهر Ẓāhir) may refer to:

== Philosophy ==
- Aẓ-Ẓāhir, one of the names of God in Islam, meaning "The Manifest, The Evident, The Outer".
- Zahir (Islam), in Islam, the exterior, surface, or apparent meaning of things
- Ẓāhiri, a school of thought in Islamic Jurisprudence

== Artistic works ==
- "The Zahir" (in the original Spanish, "El Zahir"), a 1949 short story by Argentine writer Jorge Luis Borges
- The Zahir (novel) (in the original Portuguese, O Zahir), a 2005 novel from the Brazilian writer Paulo Coelho

== People ==
- Zahir (surname)
- Al-Zahir li-i'zaz Din Allah (1005–1036), seventh caliph of the Fātimids
- Az-Zahir of Aleppo (1172–1216), son of Saladin, leader of Ayyubid dynasty
- Az-Zahir (Abbasid caliph) (1176–1226), Abbasid Caliph in Baghdad from 1225 to 1226
- al-Ẓāhir Baybars (1223/1228–1277), Mamluk sultan of Egypt and Syria
- az-Zahir Sayf ad-Din Barquq (1336–1399), first sultan of the Mamluk Burji dynasty
- Zahir-ud-Din Babur (1483–1531), established the Mughal dynasty in India in 1526
- Zahir Al Ghafri (1956–2024), Omani poet
- Zahir al-Umar (1689/90-1775), virtual Arab ruler of northern Palestine in the 18th century
- Zahir Pajaziti (1962–1997), first Commander of the Kosovo Liberation Army
- Zahir Porter (born 2000), American basketball player in the Israeli Basketball Premier League
- Mohammed Zahir Shah (1914–2007), last king of Afghanistan

== Places ==
- Zahir Mosque, Kedah's state mosque in Alor Setar

== See also ==
- Zaheer (name), Urdu spelling
- Abdul Zahir (disambiguation)
- Zahir al-Din (disambiguation)
- Dahir (disambiguation)
