= Abdulhadi al-Iraqi =

Iraqi al-Qaeda member (born 1961)

Nashwan Abdulrazaq Abdulbaqi al-Tamir
- Born: 1961 (age 64–65); Mosul, Iraq
- Citizenship: Iraqi
- Detained at: Guantanamo
- Other name: Abd al-Hadi al-Iraqi
- ISN: 10026
- Alleged to be a member of: Al-Qaeda
- Charges: Violation of 10 U.S.C. § 950t(6), Denying Quarter; Violation of 10 U.S.C. § 950t(4), Attacking Protected Property; Violation of 10 U.S.C. § 950t(17), Using Treachery Or Perfidy; Violation of 10 U.S.C. § 950t(28), Attempted Use of Treachery Or Perfidy
- Status: Pleaded guilty

Nashwan Abdulrazaq Abdulbaqi al-Tamir (Arabic: نشوان عبدالرزاق عبدالباقي التامر; born 1961), better known as Abd al-Hadi al-Iraqi (Arabic: عبد الهادي العراقي) is an Iraqi member of Al-Qaeda who is now in United States custody at Guantanamo Bay detention camp in Cuba.

== Early life ==
Al-Iraqi was born in Mosul to a Sunni Arab family in 1961. He speaks Arabic as his first language, and later learned Urdu, Pashto, Kurdish, and Persian. He served in the Iraqi Army and fought in the Iran–Iraq War. He later travelled to Afghanistan to fight the Soviet invasion.

== Alleged terrorism activities ==
According to information about him provided by the Pentagon, Hadi was a key paramilitary commander in Afghanistan during the late 1990s before taking charge of cross-border attacks against the US and coalition troops from 2002 to 2004. He was accused of commanding attacks on Afghanistan coalition forces and involvement in plots to assassinate Pakistani President Pervez Musharraf. Following the American invasion in 2001, he clashed with Ahmed Khadr arguing that front line battle would prove more useful than guerilla tactics around Shagai, Pakistan.

Al-Iraqi was alleged to have managed the Ashara guest house, in Kabul's diplomatic district, from where he was alleged to command Al-Qaeda's army, and to have served as al-Qaeda's accountant.

He had been wanted in Iraq since at least February 2005. The most recent U.S. State Department wanted poster said

Abd al-Hadi al-Iraqi is one of Usama bin Laden’s top global deputies, personally chosen by bin Laden to monitor al Qaeda operations in Iraq. Al-Hadi was the former Internal Operations Chief for al Qaeda. He has been associated with numerous attacks in Afghanistan and Pakistan and has been known to facilitate communication between al Qaeda in Iraq and al Qaeda. Al-Hadi rose to the rank of Major in Saddam Hussein’s army before moving to Afghanistan to fight against the Soviet Union. He has a reputation for being a skilled, intelligent, and experienced commander and is an extremely well-respected al Qaeda leader. He has commanded numerous terrorist training camps in Afghanistan. Al-Hadi is reportedly still in contact with Usama bin Laden.

The Newsweek article claimed that al-Iraqi brokered a 2005 reconciliation between Osama bin Laden and Abu Musab al-Zarqawi. Newsweek asserted that bin Laden had failed to anticipate the strength of the Iraqi's anti-occupation resistance and that he dispatched al-Iraqi to take charge of establishing an Al-Qaeda presence in the resistance. Newsweek asserted that Zarqawi had left a bad impression on his fellow veterans of the struggle to evict the Soviet invaders and that bin Laden didn't trust him. However, al-Iraqi recommended that Al-Qaeda would be better served by naming Zarqawi the head of Al-Qaeda in Iraq than by trying to compete with him for volunteers and establish a parallel effort—explaining the reconciliation.

It was reported in January 2002 that someone with the same pseudonyms, Abd al-Hadi al-Iraqi and Abu Abdullah, had been captured in Afghanistan. That person was also described as a training camp commander. However, despite these coincidences, the two suspects are now known to be distinct people.

Despite the report that Abd al-Hadi spoke several regional languages, several of the charges against Abdul Zahir stem from him serving as a translator for Abd al-Hadi.

A captured letter dated June 13, 2002, and thought to be from Saif al-Adel, mentions an Abd al-Hadi al-Iraqi who is relatively senior in al-Qaeda and is at large (probably in Afghanistan) at the time of that writing. The US DoD statement says that Abdul-Hadi "during 2002–04, was in charge of cross-border attacks in Afghanistan" and that before his capture, he "was trying to return to his native country, Iraq, to manage al-Qai`da's affairs and possibly focus on operations outside Iraq against Western targets".

== Capture ==
On April 27, 2007, it was reported that he was detained at Guantanamo Bay. He was previously held by the CIA. According to BBC News, US sources told them that al-Iraqi was arrested "late last year", meaning in 2006.

On September 6, 2006, US President George W. Bush officially confirmed that the CIA maintained a secret network of overseas interrogation camps when he announced that fourteen "high value detainees" had been transferred to Guantanamo from those secret camps.

Bush claimed that the transfer of these fourteen men had emptied the CIA's secret interrogation camps. Critics pointed out that Bush had not announced the closure of the camps and that the date of al-Iraqi's capture had not been made known. Al-Iraqi had a writ of habeas corpus filed on his behalf.

The Department of Defense announced on August 9, 2007, that all fourteen of the "high-value detainees" who had been transferred to Guantanamo from the CIA's black sites had been officially classified as "enemy combatants". Although judges Peter Brownback and Keith J. Allred had ruled two months earlier that only "illegal enemy combatants" could face military commissions, the Department of Defense waived the qualifier and said that all fourteen men could now face charges before Guantanamo military commissions.

== Medical condition ==
Al-Iraqi suffers from a spinal condition. Camp authorities flew in a neuro-surgical team for an emergency operation, hours before Cuba was struck by Hurricane Irma. According to Carol Rosenberg, writing in the Miami Herald, his lawyers blamed the severity of his spinal condition on a decade of medical mistreatment. On the other hand, military spokespeople used him as an example of the high-quality treatment the USA provides to captives.

According to his lawyers, a CT scan performed in January 2017 pointed out the need for surgery. Camp authorities only scheduled his surgery after he couldn't feel his legs anymore and could no longer control his urination or defecation.

On September 15, 2017, his lawyers announced that he needed another surgery on his spine and in his neck.
