= Ashara guest house =

The Ashara guest house was an al Qaeda guest house located in "Kart-E-Parwan district of Kabul, Afghanistan" [sic]. The house was reported to have been managed by Abdul Hadi al-Iraqi—widely described as al Qaeda's third in command.

Abdul Zahir, the tenth Guantanamo captive to face charges before a Guantanamo military commission, was alleged to have worked under al Iraqi, and to have assisted him in running the guesthouse.

The house was reported to have been jointly financed by al Qaeda and the Taliban Defense Ministry. In addition to serving as Abdul Hadi's headquarters for paying his network, it is reported that the graduates of al Qaeda's Afghan training camps were billeted there, prior to their assignments.

The house was also known as the "Number Ten Safe House". It was capable of housing 25-50 occupants.

Guantanamo captives Mohammed Ahmed Said Haidel, Hail Aziz Ahmad al Maythal, Omar Khalifa Mohammed Abu Bakr, Mohammed Ali Abdullah Bwazir, Omar Deghayes and Zuhail Abdo Anam Said Al Sharabi had their continued detention justified, in part, by allegations they had stayed at the guest house.
