= Abu Sayyaf (disambiguation) =

Abu Sayyaf is a Jihadist militant and pirate group in the Philippines.

Abu Sayyaf may also refer to:

- Abu Sayyaf (ISIL leader), Fathi bin Awn bin Jildi Murad al-Tunisi (died 2015)
- Abu Sayyaf (Jordan), Mohammad al-Shalabi, a Jordanian Salafi cleric
