= Mark G. Lebwohl =

American professor of dermatology

- Education: Columbia University; Harvard Medical School
- Years active: 1983-present
- Known for: psoriasis pseudoxanthoma elasticum
- Medical career
- Profession: dermatologist
- Institutions: The Mount Sinai Hospital

Mark G. Lebwohl is an American dermatologist and author who is Professor and Chairman Emeritus of the Kimberly and Eric J. Waldman Department of Dermatology and the Dean for Clinical Therapeutics at the Icahn School of Medicine at Mount Sinai in New York City.

Lebwohl's books include the book on dermatologic therapy, Treatment of Skin Disease (ISBN 0323036031), as well as Atlas of the Skin and Systemic Disease (ISBN 044306539X). He has authored more than 500 publications, multiple book chapters and has been named as one of New York Magazine’s “Best Doctors” every year since the inception of the annual list. Dr. Brian S. Kim is director of a Center for Neuroinflammation and Sensation named in Mark Lebwohl's honor at Icahn School of Medicine at Mount Sinai.

== Biography ==
=== Education ===
Lebwohl graduated from Columbia University in 1974. He earned his medical degree from Harvard Medical School in 1978 and subsequently completed residencies in both internal medicine and dermatology at the Icahn School of Medicine at Mount Sinai.

=== Career ===
In 1983, he was made assistant professor of dermatology at Mount Sinai. In 1997, he was named Chairman of the Department which, under his leadership, has been at the forefront of the management of psoriasis.

Lebwohl was the first to report the cardiac complications of pseudoxanthoma elasticum, and, additionally, he has developed new techniques for diagnosing the disease. He was also the first to use immunomodulators (imiquimod) to treat precancerous skin lesions; the first to use topical calcineurin inhibitors to treat psoriasis; and the first to identify interactions between topical vitamin D analogues such as calcipotriol and calcitriol with other topical medications and with ultraviolet light.

=== Memberships ===
Lebwohl has served as president of the New York Dermatological Society, the Manhattan Dermatologic Society, and the New York State Society of Dermatology, and as chairman of the Dermatology Section of the New York Academy of Medicine. He served as chairman of the National Psoriasis Foundation's medical board chairman of the Psoriasis Task Force of the American Academy of Dermatology (AAD) and was a member of the Scientific Assembly Council. He chaired the academy's summer meeting in 2001 in California and the AAD annual meeting in Washington, D.C. in 2004. He was elected to the Board of Directors of the AAD for 2010–2014. In 2020, he was elected to the board of the American Skin Association.

== Awards and honors ==
Lebwohl earned Presidential Citations in 2002, 2005 and 2006 from the American Academy of Dermatology. Additional awards include:

- 1993 Founder's Award, National Psoriasis Foundation
- 2001 PXE International Award
- 2003 The Jacobi medallion, Mount Sinai Medical Center
- 2003 British Medical Association Medical Books Competition
- Highly commended electronic media award for Treatment of Skin Disease, PDA version.
- 2005 Distinguished Service Award, American Dermatological Association
- 2006 Winner, The Society of Authors and the Royal Society of Medicine Book Awards for New Edition of an Edited Book, Treatment of Skin Disease: Comprehensive Therapeutic Strategies (2nd edition)

== Publications ==
=== Journals ===
Lebwohl is on the editorial board of the Journal of the American Academy of Dermatology and was the editor of the Dermatology Section of Scientific American Medicine, now called ACP Medicine. He is a founding editor of Psoriasis Forum and was medical editor of the bulletin of the National Psoriasis Foundation, Psoriasis Advance.

=== Books ===
- Lebwohl M, Heymann WR, Berth-Jones J, Coulson I, editors. Treatment of Skin Disease, 3rd edition (2010). London, Mosby 2nd edition (2006) 1st edition (2002) Also published in electronic versions and in Polish and Portuguese. ISBN 0-7020-3121-6
- Koo, JM, Lebwohl, MG, Lee, CS. (Eds.). (2009). Moderate-to-Severe Psoriasis. New York: Informa Healthcare. ISBN 1-4200-8867-X
- Koo JM, Lebwohl MG, Lee CS, editors. Mild-to-Moderate Psoriasis 2nd edition(2008). New York, Informa Healthcare 1st edition (2006) ISBN 1-4200-8860-2
- Lebwohl MG. The Skin and Systemic Disease: A Color Atlas and Text, 2nd edition (2004). New York, Churchill Livingstone Also published in French. ISBN 0-443-06539-X
- Lebwohl M. Atlas of the Skin and Systemic Disease (1995). New York, Churchill Livingstone ISBN 0-443-06539-X
- Lebwohl M, editor. Difficult Diagnoses in Dermatology (1988). New York, Churchill Livingston ISBN 0-443-08460-2
- Lebwohl M, author, treatment of Skin Disease: Comprehensive Therapeutic Strategies (2013), Saunders; 4 edition, ISBN 0-702-03375-8

=== Publications ===
Partial list:

- Roenigk, Henry H.; Auerbach, Robert; Maibach, Howard; Weinstein, Gerald; Lebwohl, Mark (March 1998). "Methotrexate in psoriasis: Consensus conference". Journal of the American Academy of Dermatology. 38 (3): 478–485. doi:10.1016/s0190-9622(98)70508-0. PMID 9520032.
- Rudikoff, Donald; Lebwohl, Mark (June 1998). "Atopic dermatitis". The Lancet. 351 (9117): 1715–1721. doi:10.1016/S0140-6736(97)12082-7. PMID 9734903. S2CID 12190324.
- Lebwohl, Mark (April 2003). "Psoriasis". The Lancet. 361 (9364): 1197–1204. doi:10.1016/S0140-6736(03)12954-6. PMID 12686053. S2CID 208794075.
- Papp, Kim A; Langley, Richard G; Lebwohl, Mark; Krueger, Gerald G; Szapary, Philippe; Yeilding, Newman; Guzzo, Cynthia; Hsu, Ming-Chun; Wang, Yuhua; Li, Shu; Dooley, Lisa T; Reich, Kristian (May 2008). "Efficacy and safety of ustekinumab, a human interleukin-12/23 monoclonal antibody, in patients with psoriasis: 52-week results from a randomised, double-blind, placebo-controlled trial (PHOENIX 2)". The Lancet. 371 (9625): 1675–1684. doi:10.1016/S0140-6736(08)60726-6. PMID 18486740. S2CID 22327170.
- Lebwohl, Mark (January 1997). "New treatments for alopecia areata". The Lancet. 349 (9047): 222–223. doi:10.1016/S0140-6736(05)64857-X. PMID 9014905. S2CID 31942949.
- Kalb, Robert E.; Strober, Bruce; Weinstein, Gerald; Lebwohl, Mark (May 2009). "Methotrexate and psoriasis: 2009 National Psoriasis Foundation Consensus Conference". Journal of the American Academy of Dermatology. 60 (5): 824–837. doi:10.1016/j.jaad.2008.11.906. PMID 19389524.
- Lebwohl, Mark; Ellis, Charles; Gottlieb, Alice; Koo, John; Krueger, Gerald; Linden, Kenneth; Shupack, Jerome; Weinstein, Gerald (September 1998). "Cyclosporine consensus conference: With emphasis on the treatment of psoriasis". Journal of the American Academy of Dermatology. 39 (3): 464–475. doi:10.1016/S0190-9622(98)70325-1. PMID 9738783.
- Lebwohl, Mark; Bagel, Jerry; Gelfand, Joel M.; Gladman, Dafna; Gordon, Kenneth B.; Hsu, Sylvia; Kalb, Robert E.; Kimball, Alexa Boer; Korman, Neil J.; Krueger, Gerald G.; Mease, Philip; Morison, Warwick L.; Paller, Amy; Pariser, David M.; Ritchlin, Christopher; Strober, Bruce; Van Voorhees, Abby; Weinstein, Gerald D.; Young, Melodie; Horn, Liz (January 2008). "From the Medical Board of the National Psoriasis Foundation: Monitoring and vaccinations in patients treated with biologics for psoriasis". Journal of the American Academy of Dermatology. 58 (1): 94–105. doi:10.1016/j.jaad.2007.08.030. PMID 17980456.
- Gold, Michael H.; Lebwohl, Mark; Biesman, Brian S.; Robinson, Deanne Mraz; Luo, Lei; Berk, David R.; Ahluwalia, Gurpreet; Alvandi, Nancy (September 2018). "Daily oxymetazoline cream demonstrates high and sustained efficacy in patients with persistent erythema of rosacea through 52 weeks of treatment". Journal of the American Academy of Dermatology. 79 (3): e57–e59. doi:10.1016/j.jaad.2018.05.037. PMID 29860043.
- Gold, Linda Stein; Lebwohl, Mark G.; Sugarman, Jeffrey L.; Pariser, David M.; Lin, Tina; Martin, Gina; Pillai, Radhakrishnan; Israel, Robert; Ramakrishna, Tage (August 2018). "Safety and efficacy of a fixed combination of halobetasol and tazarotene in the treatment of moderate-to-severe plaque psoriasis: Results of 2 phase 3 randomized controlled trials". Journal of the American Academy of Dermatology. 79 (2): 287–293. doi:10.1016/j.jaad.2018.03.040. PMID 29614243.
- Zachariae, Claus; Gordon, Kenneth; Kimball, Alexandra B.; Lebwohl, Mark; Blauvelt, Andrew; Leonardi, Craig; Braun, Daniel; McKean-Matthews, Missy; Burge, Russel; Cameron, Gregory (August 2018). "Efficacy and safety of ixekizumab over 4 years of open-label treatment in a phase 2 study in chronic plaque psoriasis". Journal of the American Academy of Dermatology. 79 (2): 294–301.e6. doi:10.1016/j.jaad.2018.03.047. PMID 29653208. S2CID 4846284.
- Czarnowicki, Tali; He, Helen; Leonard, Alexandra; Kim, Hyun Je; Kameyama, Naoya; Pavel, Ana B.; Li, Randall; Estrada, Yeriel; Wen, Huei-Chi; Kimmel, Grace W.; Kim, Hee J.; Chima, Margot; Lebwohl, Mark; Krueger, James G.; Guttman-Yassky, Emma (June 2019). "Blood endotyping distinguishes the profile of vitiligo from that of other inflammatory and autoimmune skin diseases". Journal of Allergy and Clinical Immunology. 143 (6): 2095–2107. doi:10.1016/j.jaci.2018.11.031. PMID 30576756.
- Kaushik, Shivani B.; Lebwohl, Mark G. (January 2019). "Psoriasis: Which therapy for which patient". Journal of the American Academy of Dermatology. 80 (1): 43–53. doi:10.1016/j.jaad.2018.06.056. PMID 30017706.
- Mikhaylov, Daniela; Pavel, Ana; Yao, Christopher; Kimmel, Grace; Nia, John; Hashim, Peter; Vekaria, Anjali S.; Taliercio, Mark; Singer, Giselle; Karalekas, Rachel; Baum, Danielle; Mansouri, Yasaman; Lebwohl, Mark G.; Guttman-Yassky, Emma (11 November 2018). "A randomized placebo-controlled single-center pilot study of the safety and efficacy of apremilast in subjects with moderate-to-severe alopecia areata". Archives of Dermatological Research. 311 (1): 29–36. doi:10.1007/s00403-018-1876-y. PMID 30417279. S2CID 53250523.
- Menter, Alan; Gelfand, Joel M.; Connor, Cody; Armstrong, April W.; Cordoro, Kelly M.; Davis, Dawn M.R.; Elewski, Boni E.; Gordon, Kenneth B.; Gottlieb, Alice B.; Kaplan, Daniel H.; Kavanaugh, Arthur; Kiselica, Matthew; Kivelevitch, Dario; Korman, Neil J.; Kroshinsky, Daniela; Lebwohl, Mark; Leonardi, Craig L.; Lichten, Jason; Lim, Henry W.; Mehta, Nehal N.; Paller, Amy S.; Parra, Sylvia L.; Pathy, Arun L.; Prater, Elizabeth Farley; Rahimi, Robert S.; Rupani, Reena N.; Siegel, Michael; Stoff, Benjamin; Strober, Bruce E.; Tapper, Elliot B.; Wong, Emily B.; Wu, Jashin J.; Hariharan, Vidhya; Elmets, Craig A. (June 2020). "Joint American Academy of Dermatology–National Psoriasis Foundation guidelines of care for the management of psoriasis with systemic nonbiologic therapies". Journal of the American Academy of Dermatology. 82 (6): 1445–1486. doi:10.1016/j.jaad.2020.02.044. PMID 32119894.
- Lebwohl, Mark; Rivera-Oyola, Ryan; Murrell, Dedee F. (May 2020). "Should biologics for psoriasis be interrupted in the era of COVID-19?". Journal of the American Academy of Dermatology. 82 (5): 1217–1218. doi:10.1016/j.jaad.2020.03.031. PMC 7156810. PMID 32199889.
