= Ahlus Sunnah Wal Jamaah =

Ahlus Sunnah Wal Jamaah (ASWJ) is the formal name used by Sunni Muslims to refer to Sunni Islam. It may also refer to:

- Achli Sunah wal Djamaah, an Indonesian armed militia
- Ahlus Sunnah Wal Jam'ah Association of Australia, a Sunni organisation
- Ahlu Sunna Waljama'a, a Sufi militia in Somalia
- Al-Shabaab of Mozambique (Ahlu Sunna Wal Jammah), an Islamist militant group active in Cabo Delgado Province, Mozambique
- Sipah-e-Sahaba Pakistan (Ahl-e-Sunnat Wal Jamat Party), a Pakistani Sunni Deobandi Islamist political party
- Barelvi Movement, a Sunni revivalist movement in South-Asia that is also known as Ahl al-Sunnah wal-Jama'ah
- Jamaat Ahle Sunnat, Sunni Barelvi organisation in Pakistan
