= An Educational Encyclopedia of Islam =

Reference work by Syed Iqbal Zaheer

- Author: Syed Iqbal Zaheer
- Language: English
- Genre: Encyclopedia
- Published: 2010 (Iqra Publication, Bangalore, India)
- Publication place: India
- Media type: Print (hardcover)
- Pages: 1300 (2 volumes)
- ISBN: 978-603-90004-40

An Educational Encyclopedia of Islam is a 2010 encyclopedia written by Islamic scholar Syed Iqbal Zaheer from Bangalore, India and published by Iqra Publishers. He is the editor of the Young Muslim Digest – a monthly Islamic magazine since 1976. He is also the author of several books like Islam: The Religion You Can No Longer Ignore, Fake Pearls: A Collection of Fabricated Prophetic Sayings and Tafsir Ishraq Al-Ma'ani.

This two volume encyclopedia which consists of 1300 pages is covering all the aspects of Islam in depth with graphical illustrations. This encyclopedia has significant notes, four dozen full-scale and unique multi-color maps. Apart from Muhammad and the earliest Muslims, the encyclopedia also explores the lives of prominent figures from modern Islamic history like Jamaluddin Al-Afghani, Muhammad Iqbal, Syed Abul A’la Mawdudi, Maulana Muhammad Ilyas and Hassan Al-Banna.

This information bank is available on the Internet and can be accessed by universities, students from around the world. “An educational encyclopedia of Islam” is also accessible on apps store. This app was developed on 21 August 2013 by Utrade studios.
