= Alberta Banner Turner =

American academic (1909–2008)

- Born: March 17, 1909
- Died: January 31, 2008 (aged 98); Hilo, Hawai’i
- Education: Ohio State University (B.A., M.A., Ph.D.)
- Scientific career
- Fields: Psychology
- Thesis: The Effect of Practice on the Perception and Memorization of Digits Presented in Single Exposures

Alberta Banner Turner (March 17, 1909 – January 31, 2008) was an African American professor and psychologist, and a noted civil rights and women's rights activist in the field of psychology.

== Professional life ==
=== Education ===
Turner attended Ohio State University, in Columbus, Ohio, for all 3 of her college degrees. Turner was a dedicated OSU student and Alpha Kappa Alpha alumna; she earned her bachelor's degree in 1929 and a master's degree in education in 1931 from the university. Turner then received her Ph.D. in 1935 for her dissertation entitled: "The Effect of Practice on the Perception and Memorization of Digits Presented in Single Exposures." Turner is credited as being the third black women to each a doctorate in psychology in the United States, after Inez Prosser, and Ruth Howard.

=== Career ===
Turner became the head of the home economics department at what was then known as Winston-Salem College in North Carolina from 1935 through 1936 before moving on to become the chair of the Home Economics Division at Lincoln University in Missouri from 1936 through 1937; from 1938 to 1939 head of the Department of Home Economics at Southern University in Louisiana; 1939 head of the home economics department at Bennett College for Women in North Carolina. During this period she lectured on consumer issues at the college and in the summer of 1941 was awarded a fellowship to Stephens College in Columbia, Missouri, for study at the school's Institute of Consumer Education. She was the first black woman to do so. In 1944 Turner returned to Ohio as a clinician at the Ohio Bureau of Juvenile Research (what is now known as the Ohio Department of Youth Services).

Upon her return to Ohio, Turner grew very active in her research and during the 1950s she lectured at the Ohio State University in the areas of psychopathology and juvenile delinquency while continuing as a psychologist at what is now known as Ohio Department of Youth Services. She earned the position of Supervising Psychologist at the Juvenile Diagnostic Center in 1953 and was promoted to Chief Psychologist in 1959. This period of her life is also marked her diligent work as a clinical psychologist working with juveniles at Marysville Reformatory for Women (now known as Ohio Reformatory for Women). In 1963 Turner was promoted to the Central Administrative Office of the Ohio Youth Commission and became the director of research for the Ohio Youth Commission, while continuing her work at the Ohio State University and the Ohio Reformatory for Women. Turner's rigorous activities included her role with the Criminal Justice Supervisory Commission from 1972 to 1976. During this time, she also served as a consultant to the National Advisory Council on Vocational Rehabilitation.

=== Community involvement ===
Turner was a fierce advocate for civil rights for African Americans. During high school, she attended a "whites-only" prom to challenge the discrimination against Black students. Shortly after graduating, Turner and other students tried to go into a "whites-only" movie theatre, from which they were denied access and took legal action against the manager.

Turner was also active in African American social organizations. She served as the fourth president of the National Jack and Jill of America Foundation in 1953. Turner then became the founding president of the Columbus chapter and the first national program director of The Links Inc., which has 10,000 members nationwide. She has been instrumental in establishing the Prelude Scholarship and Recognition Program, a partnership of Links, Ohio State, and the Columbus Public Schools to honor minority students. Links also has funded an endowed scholarship at Ohio State to support minority students.

=== Recognition and awards ===
In 1966, she was named one of the "Ten Women of the Year" by the Columbus Citizen-Journal. Upon her retirement in 1971 she was awarded a citation from the State of Ohio for a lifetime of work in the field of Juvenile Rehabilitation and Treatment. In 1999 The Ohio State University recognized Turner with Distinguished Service Award duly noting: "Through her professional and academic activities, Turner has served as a role model and counselor for young people, especially troubled teenagers, and she has been a pioneer for African Americans in the diagnosis and treatment of delinquent behavior. She has been a strong advocate for racial, civil and religious rights and has worked tirelessly to ensure them for others". Her tireless efforts were not overlooked by the Ohio Psychological Association who in 2003 awarded Turner the “Achievement Award for a Psychologist in the Public Interest.” The motivating stories of Turner's lifelong accomplishments are well written about in articles ranging from Jet magazine to Psychology of Women Quarterly and in each and every instance Turner is righteously held out as role model and inspiration for today's youth.
