= Kathleen Kenna =

Canadian journalist

Kathleen Kenna is a Canadian journalist who was injured in a grenade attack in Afghanistan on March 4, 2002.

== Adult life and career ==
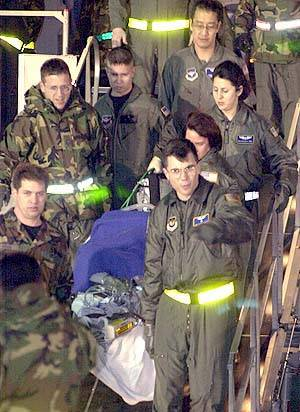
Members of Ramstein's 86th Aeromedical Airlift Squadron carry Canadian reporter Kathleen Kenna, injured in Afghanistan, from a C-9 Nightingale of the 75th Airlift Squadron to a waiting ambulance upon arrival at Ramstein AB, Germany, March 6.

Kenna has been involved in journalism since the age of 15, and obtained a degree in Journalism from Carleton University aged 21. She began her career at the Toronto Star in 1981 and worked reporting primarily on Canadian political affairs. In 1997 she was promoted from reporter to editor at the Washington Bureau, and worked there until 2001, marrying in 2000 to Hadi Dadashian.

In 2001 Kenna became the Star's South-east Asia Bureau chief. After the September 11 attacks in the U.S., Kenna went to Afghanistan to report on the war.

Kenna was injured in an attack in Afghanistan on March 4, 2002. While traveling with her husband Hadi Dadashian, Toronto Star photographer Bernard Weil, and an Afghan driver on the road from Kubul to Gardez, a grenade thrown into the car exploded underneath Kenna's seat, seriously injuring her. Following the attack she was taken to a medical facility in Gardez with the help of Agence France-Presse journalists who were also on the road at the same time. After treatment at the medical compound she airlifted by helicopter to Bagram air base in Kabul and then transported to a United States air base in Karshi-Khanabad Uzbekistan where two operations were performed, then to Rammstein Air Base in Germany for further treatment and finally back to Canada.

On January 16, 2006 Abdul Zahir was charged by a Guantanamo military commission for allegedly playing a role in the attack on Kenna.

== Education ==
In 2004 Kenna became a visiting scholar at the University of California, Berkeley during a one year fellowships in Journalism and Canadian studies at the Graduate School of Journalism. She delivered the September 23, 2004 Sproul lecture, entitled: "Heroism in the Desert: a Canadian journalist and her American rescuers in Afghanistan."

After finishing the fellowship at Berkeley, Kenna studied at San Francisco State University between 2005 and 2008 towards a masters qualification in rehabilitation counseling and became involved in helping people who have suffered severe and traumatic wounds deal psychologically with their injuries.

Kenna wrote an op-ed about her feelings about Abdul Zahir's trial on December 27, 2009. She wrote that she and her companions weren't interested in retribution. She wrote that she hopes Abdul Zahir has a truly fair trial. She wrote that she and her companions couldn't identify their attackers. She wrote that she had witnessed an aerial bombardment, in the area, earlier that day, and she speculated that her attackers may not have been prepared to distinguish between the foreigner forces bombarding Afghanistan and foreign journalists reporting on the conflict.
