= Brian S. Kim =

American academic

- Born: New York, NY
- Education: Haverford College, University of Washington School of Medicine, University of Pennsylvania School of Medicine
- Occupations: Sol and Clara Kest Professor, Vice Chair of Research, Site Chair, Director of Mark Lebwohl Center
- Medical career
- Field: Dermatology, Allergy, Immunology, Neuroimmunology, Sensory Biology
- Institutions: Mount Sinai Health System
- Website: Kim Lab

Brian S. Kim is Vice President and Chief Biotechnology Officer at Northwell Health, Head of Intellectual Asset Management at the Feinstein Institutes for Medical Research, and the inaugural Robin and Jack Ross Chair in Bioelectronic Medicine and Neuroimmunology and Professor in the Institute of Bioelectronic Medicine.

== Education ==
Kim received his B.S. in chemistry with honors from Haverford College in 2001 and his M.D. from the University of Washington in 2007. He was a Howard Hughes Medical Institute-National Institutes of Health Research Scholar under Stephen I. Katz, and completed his residency in dermatology at the Perelman School of Medicine at the University of Pennsylvania. He completed a postdoctoral fellowship under David Artis, leading to a Master of Translational Research.

== Career ==
Kim previously served as the Sol and Clara Kest Professor, Vice Chair of Research, and Site Chair of Mount Sinai West and Morningside in the Kimberly and Eric J. Waldman Department of Dermatology at Icahn School of Medicine at Mount Sinai. He was also Director of the Mark Lebwohl Center for Neuroinflammation and Sensation and lead of the Allen Discovery Center for Neuroimmune Interactions at the Icahn School of Medicine at Mount Sinai.

== Research ==
He was the first to identify IL-4 receptor signaling on sensory neurons, which critically informed new therapies like dupilumab. Kim's group also was the first lab to identify JAK1 signaling in sensory neurons, building on previous research which showed a significant reduction of itch symptoms in response to treatment with JAK inhibitors. While these previous works investigated JAK inhibition as an anti-inflammatory treatment, Kim and colleagues found that disruption of neuronal JAK1 signaling limits both inflammatory and non-inflammatory itch, suggesting that JAK inhibitors may represent a novel neuromodulatory approach to target itch in atopic dermatitis Kim also designed the pivotal phase 2 clinical trial that ultimately led to the approval of topical ruxolitinib for atopic dermatitis.
