= Abu Sayyaf (Jordan) =

Salafi cleric

Mohammad al-Shalabi (in Arabic محمد الشلبي, born in Ma'an, Jordan) better known as Abu Sayyaf (in Arabic أبو سياف) is a Salafi cleric and the head of the Jordanian Jihadi Salafist Movement (in Arabic التيار السلفي الجهادي في الأردن). He was sentenced to death in 2006 because of Ma'an riots he was accused of instigating and leading in January 2002 against Jordanian authorities. He was also thought to have links to the Muslim Brotherhood in Jordan and to Al Qaeda and at least some level of involvement in the assassination of USAID official Laurence Foley outside his home in Amman, Jordan on October 28, 2002. Abu Sayyaf denied any connection to the murder, though he did reportedly condone the action.

After being pursued by security forces for months, he was ultimately arrested in 2004, charged and sentenced to a death in 2006. In 2007 a special pardon commuted his sentence to serve 15-year imprisonment with hard labor. In June 2011, a new special pardon permitted his release just four years into his new sentence. He remains influential in the Jordanian Salafi movement particularly in Ma'an.

After release from prison, he joined less radical salafi groups for a more mainstream political role in what became known as the progressive Salafi-Jihadis in Jordan and institutionalization of his movement within Jordan's broader political life and leading the efforts for establishing a Shura Council to represent Salafi-Jihadis across Jordan, comprising representatives from each of the country's 12 governorates.

He also reportedly encourages Islamists to go to Syria to fight. He remains a respected figure by locals mediating with tribal chiefs in disputes with the Jordanian authorities, saying his followers have no interest in destabilizing Jordan.
