= Thomas Bogar =

American lawyer

Thomas J. Bogar is an American lawyer and officer in the United States Army Reserves. He was a Guantanamo Bay attorney, for Abdul Zahir.

Bogar was appointed to defend Abdul Zahir, an Afghan from the same guest house in Faisalabad where Abu Zubaydah was captured. He has been at Guantanamo Bay since then. Bogar made two trips Afghanistan, to help prepare Abdul Zahir's defense. Bogar reports that Abdul Zahir has been subjected to non-traditional interrogations techniques, including:"Hoods, loud music, putting him in extremely hot and cold rooms, strapping him to chairs in uncomfortable positions."

Bogar was an early proponent for trying terrorism suspects by adopting the rules for courts-martial---spelled out in the Uniform Code of Military Justice.

In 2007, LTC Bogar presented his lecture, "Guantanamo - Still a legal black hole?" at the Wisconsin Bar Annual Convention. After two years with the Military Commissions, Bogar returned home. Soon thereafter, he received an emergency call from his former client, Abdul Zahir, still in Guantanamo Bay. Abdul Zahir required emergency spinal surgery and requested Bogar's counsel and advice. This operation was referenced in a later op-ed by former JTF Commander. Following the successful operation, Bogar returned to Guantanamo one last time to visit with Abdul Zahir before his next military tour. Abdul Zahir remains in custody at Guantanamo Bay. In April 2009, Mr. Bogar's law review article titled "Unlawful Combatant or Innocent Civilian? A Call to Change the Current Means for Determining Status of Prisoners in the Global War on Terror," appeared in the April 2009 edition of the Florida Journal of International Law. The foreword was written by Israeli Supreme Court Justice Eliezier Rivlin.

Bogar returned home to his private legal practice in August 2009 following almost 5 years of active military service after 9/11. However, he is considered a terrorism expert and is often sought to speak. Following discussions on whether to try the 9/11 terrorists in the United States, Mr. Bogar published an opinion editorial in March 2010 opposing bringing any of the 9/11 terrorism suspects to the continental United States for detention and/or trial.
