= Salem bin Suweid and Yasser Freihat =

Libyan and Jordanian Islamist militants

Salem bin Suweid (alias Abu Suheib Habib, Salem bin Suriya) and Yasser Freihat (alias Yasser Fathi Ibraheem) (both died 11 March 2006) were Islamist militants who were executed in 2006 for the 2002 assassination of American diplomat Laurence Foley in Amman, Jordan.

Bin Suweid, a Libyan, and Freihat, a Jordanian, were arrested in Jordan on 14 December 2002 and charged with the shooting death of Foley. Jordan claimed that the two men were paid to kill Foley by Abu Musab al-Zarqawi, an Islamist militant leader, later the commander of al-Qaeda in Iraq. Both Bin Suweid and Freihat confessed and in 2004 were sentenced to death by hanging by the State Security Court. Al-Zarqawi was also sentenced to death in absentia.

Prior to their executions, Bin Suweid and Freihat alleged that Jordanian officials had forced them to confess to the assassination. Both men were hanged at Swaka Prison near Amman on 11 March 2006.
