= Syed Iqbal Zaheer =

Indian Islamic scholar and writer (born 1944)

- Born: 1944; Bombay, British India
- Died: 2 April 2026 (aged 81–82); United Arab Emirates
- Occupation: Engineer by profession
- Known for: Religious scholar
- Notable work: An Educational Encyclopedia of Islam, Tafsir Ishraq Al-Ma'ani, Islam: The Religion You Can No Longer Ignore, editor Young Muslim Digest

Syed Iqbal Zaheer (1944 – 2 April 2026) was an Indian Islamic scholar and writer. By profession, he was an engineer. He was trained in Islamic disciplines by traditional scholars and had proficiency in English, Arabic, and Urdu. A polymath and prolific writer, he wrote on a wide range of subjects, including advanced scientific topics such as cellular biology, quantum physics, and astrophysics.

Zaheer served as the editor of the monthly magazine Young Muslim Digest, published from Bangalore, for over three decades. His editorials and responses in the “Letters to the Editor” section were widely read and appreciated by readers across several countries.

He died on 2 April 2026 in the United Arab Emirates.

== Literary work ==
Syed Iqbal Zaheer is also the author of several books:

=== Islam: The Religion You Can No Longer Ignore ===
This book is all about the introduction of Islam. This book deals with the readers relationship with God.

=== Fake Pearls ===
It is a collection of fabricated prophetic sayings. This work – collected from five different books – is a short collection of such reports as falsely attributed to Muhammad, and which have somehow been popular among the masses through the centuries.

=== A Short History of Israel ===
With introduction by Abul Hasan Ali Nadwi, it presents the history of the Jews from the times of Abraham until the end of the last century.

=== Bilal, the Abyssinian Out runner ===
It is about the life of Bilal written in a story style, but within the parameters of historical evidences.

=== Muhammad the Unlettered Prophet Who Changed the World in 23 years ===
A short biography of Muhammad.

=== An Educational encyclopedia of Islam ===
This two volume Islamic Encyclopedia which consists of 1300 pages is covering all the aspects of Islam in depth. It is written in very simple language. Though basically intended for use as a school text book, the encyclopedia is also an ideal tool for home schooling involving both the parents and the children.

=== Abul Hasan Ali Nadwi ===
It is a biography of Syed Abul Hasan Ali al-Nadwi in 110 pages.

=== Fundamentals of the Islamic Creed ===
The book is a summary of the faiths and beliefs of the Ahl al-Sunnah wa al-Jama’ah, the mainstream Muslim creed.

=== A Voice to Hear ===
Many non-Muslims wish to know what the Qur'an is about, but are not sure if they should procure a copy. These passages should give them some idea of the central theme of the Qur'anic message: Man’s creation by God, sending of Prophets, destruction of the world, raising up of the dead, accounting and judgment.

=== Tafsir Ishraq al-Ma`ani ===
In 8 volumes, some 3500 pages presents opinions of scholars of first few generations, and majority opinions of the commentators throughout Muslim history, with the provision that such opinions do not contradict a meaning given out by the majority of the Salaf.

== Lectures and Dars ==
His weekly Qur'anic Dars and lectures are fairly well attended by the educated class. But, following the fatwa of classical Deoband scholars, he does not allow filming of his talks, does not believe in globe-trotting, and strongly objects to any praise directed at him as he believes that men who deserved praise are in their graves.

== Social work ==
He runs an Islamic Institute for Girls teenage and older in the town of Hassan near Bangalore, whose syllabus emphasizes the Arabic language.
