= Zahir (surname) =

Zahir is an Arabic surname. Notable people with the surname include:

- Abdul Zahir (politician) (1910–1983), Prime Minister of Afghanistan from 1971 to 1972
- Abdul Zahir (Guantanamo Bay detainee 753) (born 1972)
- Ahmad Zahir (1946–1979), singer from Afghanistan
- Mohommad Zahir (born 1953), Guantanamo Bay detainee
- Mohamed Zahir (born c. 1950), Chief of Staff of the Republic of Maldives National Defence Force
- Nastaran Zahir, American bioengineer
- Shahidul Zahir (1953–2008), Bangladeshi novelist and short story writer
