= Commission on Rehabilitation Counselor Certification =

U.S. certifying organization

- Formation: 1973
- Headquarters: Schaumburg, Illinois, United States
- Executive Director: Pamela Shlemon
- Website: crccertification.com

The Commission on Rehabilitation Counselor Certification is a national certifying organization for professional rehabilitation counselors. Based in Schaumburg, Illinois, it is an independent, not-for-profit organization whose purpose is to establish, maintain, and monitor a national certification program for Certified Rehabilitation Counselors, including maintaining a register of all certified counselors and providing certification status for the public. The commission also maintains and updates a Code of Professional Ethics for Rehabilitation Counselors under which all certified rehabilitation counselors must practice. The certification program is accredited by the National Commission for Certifying Agencies, the accrediting organization of the Institute for Credentialing Excellence.

The commission has over 15,000 certified rehabilitation counselors. While the majority practice in the United States, some also practice in other countries worldwide.

== History ==
The road to the creation of the CRCC officially began in 1963 when the Professional Standards Committee of the National Rehabilitation Counseling Association (NRCA) proposed a professional certification for rehabilitation counselors and an associated governing body. No substantive movement would occur until 1969, when the Professional Relations Committee of the American Rehabilitation Counseling Association (ARCA) and the External Relations Committee of the NRCA held a joint meeting to discuss certification. Together, these bodies penned a proposal to form a joint committee with membership from the two groups to conduct a role and function analysis of rehabilitation counseling based on the work being performed in the field. A committee of 12 individuals subsequently met in April 1971 and developed the proposal to determine the professional standards required for potential certification both in terms of educational requirements and work experience, and to establish an independent credentialing body.

Subsequently, in 1973, ARCA/NRCA created the Joint Committee on Rehabilitation Counselor Certification. It was incorporated in January 1974 and renamed the Commission on Rehabilitation Counselor Certification. For its first three decades, the governing body of the commission included representatives appointed by other rehabilitation counseling organizations. Since the early 21st century, the commission is governed by an independently elected Board of Directors.

The commission continues to work with the two counseling associations and others to further the profession of rehabilitation counseling. In addition, the organizations also pursue different goals: the American Rehabilitation Counseling Association and the National Rehabilitation Counseling Association concentrate on membership association activities such as conferences, professional development, and publications, while the Commission on Rehabilitation Counselor Certification concentrates on promoting quality rehabilitation counseling services for individuals with disabilities through certification.

== Certifications ==
Individuals who pass the voluntary certification examination, become qualified as Certified Rehabilitation Counselors (CRCs). To maintain certification, counselors are required to stay current either through re-examination or by meeting specific ongoing educational requirements every five years.

=== Certified Rehabilitation Counselor ===
The requirements include the following:

- A master's or doctorate degree in
1. Rehabilitation counseling
2. Counseling, or a
3. Qualifying counseling-related major plus a post-graduate advanced certificate or degree with specific coursework
- Requisite rehabilitation counseling experience including
1. acceptable internship under a certified rehabilitation counselor's supervision, and/or
2. acceptable employment under certified rehabilitation counselor's supervision
- A passing score on the Certified Rehabilitation Counselor Exam

Certification is voluntary and not required for supervised or independent practice, although it may be a hiring requirement of certain employers. It identifies rehabilitation counselors who have voluntarily sought and met established standards. It is not a substitute for state-mandated licensure. Many states use the certification exam as part of their licensing requirements, which may provide license portability for rehabilitation counselors who wish to practice in more than one state.

=== Additional certifications ===
The commission also maintains additional certifications:

- Canadian Certified Rehabilitation Counselor
- Certified Vocational Evaluation Specialist
- Certified Work Adjustment Specialist
- Certified Career Assessment Associate

While there are several hundred counselors holding these credentials, they are no longer offered to new applicants.

== Job skills and work settings ==
Rehabilitation counselors are the only professional counselors educated and trained specifically to serve individuals with disabilities. They assist individuals with physical, mental, developmental, cognitive, and emotional disabilities to achieve their personal, career, and independent living goals by engaging in a complete counseling process.

Certified rehabilitation counselors may specialize within many areas of rehabilitation counseling for people with disabilities, including:

- Employee assistance programming
- Expert testimony
- Job development/job placement
- Life care planning
- Marriage and family counseling
- Mental health counseling
- Return-to-work coordination
- School, education, and career counseling
- Substance abuse and addiction counseling
- Teaching and education
- Vocational evaluation
- Vocational rehabilitation

Certified rehabilitation counselors are employed in a variety of work settings including:

- Forensics
- Government agencies
- Independent living centers
- Hospitals
- Insurance companies
- Mental health centers
- Private practice
- Rehabilitation facilities
- Schools and universities
- Other organizations where individuals with disabilities are being counseled with the goal of going or returning to work
