= Achli Sunah wal Djamaah =

- Founder: Hadji Engkar
- Leader: Hadji Engkar
- Founded: February 1954
- Dates active: 1954–1955
- Dissolved: August 1955
- Active regions: Bogor Regency, West Java, Indonesia
- Wars: Darul Islam rebellion

Achli Sunah wal Djamaah (abbreviated as ASWD) was an insurgent group active in Bogor Regency, Indonesia from 1954 to 1955.

== Background ==
In 1953, the TNI launched several military operations against a DI/TII unit led by Hadji Engkar in Jonggol, undermining the group's strength. This situation led Achmad Sungkawa, DI/TII commander, to take over command from Hadji Engkar, and the conflict between Engkar and Sungkawa ensued. As a result, Engkar decided to leave DI/TII and created an armed group named Achli Sunah wal Djamaah.

== Operation ==
=== 1954 ===
Responding to the creation of ASWD, Kartosoewirjo entrusted Djaelani to defeat ASWD and kill Engkar. ASWD clashed with a DI/TII unit led by Sungkawa on 13 May 1954 in the Bogor and Cianjur region, killing one ASWD member. The clash between the two belligerents ended when TNI attacked both groups. On 22 June, three people were killed, and eight were injured near Passir Maung estate, Bogor, and ASWD was believed to be the mastermind of the killing. Twelve ASWD militias attacked Cileteuh hamlet, Cipayung, Bogor for food supplies in November 1954. During the attack, they looted villagers' properties and abducted one person.

=== 1955 ===
Eight ASWD members surrendered and handed over two Steyr rifles and one Mauser rifle to the government in Bantarkalong, Bogor in April 1955. ASWD attacked village guards near Babakan Sari, Pabuaran, Cariu, Jonggol and the clash resulted in the death of eight ASWD member. On 18 August 1955, TNI captured Hadji Engkar alive in Ciawi and it resulted to the dissolvement of ASWD.
