= National Institute of Arthritis and Musculoskeletal and Skin Diseases =

U.S. health institute

Coordinates: 39.00140°N 77.09914°W

National Institute of Arthritis and Musculoskeletal and Skin Diseases (NIAMS)

Agency overview
- Formed: August 4, 1986; 40 years ago
- Jurisdiction: Federal Government of the United States
- Agency executive: Lindsey A. Criswell, Director
- Parent department: Department of Health and Human Services
- Parent agency: National Institutes of Health
- Website: www.niams.nih.gov

The National Institute of Arthritis and Musculoskeletal and Skin Diseases (NIAMS) is one of the institutes and centers that make up the National Institutes of Health, an agency of the United States Department of Health and Human Services (HHS).

NIH is the primary federal agency that conducts and supports basic, clinical and translational medical research. The institute investigates the prevention, diagnosis, causes, treatments and cures for both common and rare diseases.

== Mission ==
NIAMS' mission is to support the research of arthritis, musculoskeletal and skin diseases. The institute also disseminates information on research progress in these diseases. NIAMS supports and conducts basic, clinical, translational and epidemiologic research and research training at universities and medical centers.

The institute also conducts and supports basic research on the normal structure and function of bones, joints, muscles, and skin. Basic research involves a wide variety of scientific disciplines, including immunology, genetics, molecular biology, structural biology, biochemistry, physiology, virology, and pharmacology. Clinical research includes rheumatology, orthopedics, dermatology, metabolic bone diseases, heritable disorders of bone and cartilage, inherited and inflammatory muscle diseases, and sports and rehabilitation medicine.

== Legislative chronology ==
August 1950—An arthritis program was established within the National Institute of Arthritis and Metabolic Diseases under Public Law 81-692.

May 1972—P.L. 92-305 renamed the institute the National Institute of Arthritis, Metabolism, and Digestive Diseases.

1973—Senator Alan Cranston introduced legislation that would eventually lead to the National Arthritis Act. Companion legislation was introduced in the House by Congressman Paul Rogers.

January 1975—The National Arthritis Act (P.L. 93-640) established the National Commission on Arthritis and Related Musculoskeletal Diseases to study the problem of arthritis and to develop an arthritis plan. The act established the position of associate director for arthritis and related musculoskeletal diseases and authorized an interagency arthritis coordinating committee; community demonstration project grants; an arthritis data bank; an information clearinghouse; and comprehensive centers for research, diagnosis, treatment, rehabilitation and education.

April 1976—After a year of study and public hearings, the commission issued a comprehensive plan aimed at diminishing the physical, economic and psychosocial effects of arthritis and musculoskeletal diseases. It laid the groundwork for a national program encompassing research, research training, education and patient care.

October 1976—The Arthritis, Diabetes, and Digestive Diseases Amendments of 1976 (P.L. 94-562) established the National Arthritis Advisory Board to review and evaluate the implementation of the Arthritis Plan, prepared in response to the National Arthritis Act (P.L. 93-640).

December 1980—P.L. 96-538 changed the name of the institute to the National Institute of Arthritis, Diabetes, and Digestive and Kidney Diseases.

1982—HHS conferred bureau status on the institute, resulting in the creation of the Division of Arthritis, Musculoskeletal and Skin Diseases and the appointment of a Division Director.

November 1985—The Health Research Extension Act of 1985, P.L. 99–158, established the National Institute of Arthritis and Musculoskeletal and Skin Diseases to increase research emphasis. The legislation provided for the development of a plan for a national arthritis and musculoskeletal diseases program and established two interagency coordinating committees, one on arthritis and musculoskeletal diseases and one on skin diseases. It also expanded the activities of the National Arthritis Advisory Board to include these diseases.

September 1993—The NIH Revitalization Act of 1993 (P.L. 103–43) directed NIAMS to establish "an information clearinghouse on osteoporosis and related bone disorders to facilitate and enhance knowledge and understanding on the part of health professionals, patients, and the public through the effective dissemination of information."

October 2000—The Children's Health Act of 2000 (P.L. 106–310) directed NIAMS to expand and intensify research programs on juvenile arthritis and related conditions, in coordination with other NIH Institutes and the Arthritis and Musculoskeletal Diseases Interagency Coordinating Committee. The institute directed to include resources on juvenile arthritis and associated conditions in its clearinghouse.

November 2000—The Lupus Research and Care Amendments of 2000, which passed as part of the Public Health Improvement Act (P.L. 106–505), required NIAMS to expand and intensify research and related activities regarding lupus. Among other provisions, the bill called for information and education programs.

December 2001—The Muscular Dystrophy Community Assistance, Research, and Education Amendments of 2001, or the MD-CARE Act (P.L. 107–84), called on several components of the NIH, including the NIAMS, to enhance research on muscular dystrophy, including establishing centers of excellence.

February 2003—The Omnibus Appropriations Act for FY 2003 (P.L. 108–7) directed Office of the Secretary, HHS, to establish a federal working group on lupus for the purpose of exchanging information and coordinating federal efforts regarding lupus research and education initiatives. NIAMS led this federal working group. The group has representatives from all relevant HHS agencies and other federal departments.

October 2008—The Paul D. Wellstone Muscular Dystrophy Community Assistance, Research, and Education (MD-CARE) Amendments of 2008 (P.L. 110–361) officially named the related centers of excellence after the senator. In addition, the Muscular Dystrophy Coordinating Committee was authorized to give special consideration to enhance the clinical research infrastructure to test emerging therapies.

September 2014—The Paul D. Wellstone Muscular Dystrophy Community Assistance, Research and Education (MD-CARE) Amendments of 2014 (P.L. 113–166) made several changes to the program's authorization, including expanding the types of muscular dystrophy for which NIH must conduct research, expanding the membership of the MDCC and requiring it to meet two times each year, and expanding the items to be covered in the Action Plan for the Muscular Dystrophies.

== Directors ==
Directors from 1986–present

No.	Portrait	Name	Term start	Term end	Refs.
1		Lawrence E. Shulman	April 1986	October 31, 1994	
Acting		Michael D. Lockshin	November 1, 1994	July 31, 1995	
2		Stephen I. Katz	August 1, 1995	December 20, 2018 (Note: Died in office)	
Acting		Robert H. Carter	December 21, 2018	February 15, 2021	
3		Lindsey A. Criswell	February 16, 2021	Present	

Table Notes:

== Programs ==
The NIAMS supports a multidisciplinary program of basic, clinical, and translational investigations; epidemiologic research; research centers; and research training for scientists within its own facilities as well as grantees at universities and medical schools nationwide. It also supports the dissemination of research results and information through the National Institute of Arthritis and Musculoskeletal and Skin Diseases Information Clearinghouse and through the NIH Osteoporosis and Related Bone Diseases National Resource Center.

The NIAMS Extramural Program supports research supports research via grants and contracts in the Division of Extramural Research. Researchers pursue a wide array of basic, translational, and clinical research and research training in the fields of rheumatology, muscle biology, orthopedics, bone and mineral metabolism, and dermatology through these programs.

The Intramural Research Program of the NIAMS conducts innovative basic, translational, and clinical research relevant to the health concerns of the institute and provides training for investigators interested in careers in these areas. The ultimate goals are: 1) to provide new insights into the normal function of immune cells, bones, muscles, and skin, and diseases that affect them, especially immune and inflammatory diseases; and 2) to generate a cadre of well-trained investigators to continue toward a complete understanding of these structures and the disease conditions that affect them adversely.

=== Extramural research ===
==== Division of Extramural Research ====
The NIAMS Division of Extramural Research (DER) supports scientific research via grants and contracts in the NIAMS mission areas. Most funding from the NIAMS supports investigators involved in a variety of basic, clinical, epidemiologic, training, and other programs in universities, medical schools, academic health centers, and small business concerns, all of which comprise the extramural research community.

Spanning the fields of rheumatology, muscle biology, orthopedics, bone and mineral metabolism, and dermatology, the DER is divided into five distinct research areas, each of which encompasses several individual scientific programs. As well, the DER includes an Office of Extramural Operations (OEO), which is responsible for assuring compliance with NIH and NIAMS policies and procedures with regard to scientific review, grants management, and clinical research administration.

Systemic Rheumatic and Autoimmune Diseases. The overall goals of the programs comprising Systemic Rheumatic and Autoimmune Diseases are to advance high-quality basic, translational, and clinical research in autoimmune and arthritis-related chronic disorders. These disorders include the adult diseases of rheumatoid arthritis, systemic lupus erythematosus (lupus), scleroderma, vasculitis, the spondyloarthropathies (e.g., ankylosing spondylitis, psoriatic arthritis), gout, fibromyalgia, and Sjögren's syndrome. Pediatric diseases, such as juvenile idiopathic arthritis, periodic fever syndromes, and juvenile lupus are also included. Additionally, the programs support studies focused on the natural history of these disorders, as well as molecular mechanisms of autoimmunity and inflammation, with the goal of finding ways to disrupt them and improve patient outcomes. The NIAMS is committed to pursuing new opportunities in genetics and genomics research, clinical trial design, pain, and biopsychosocial aspects of diseases in this portfolio. It is also committed to identification of risk factors for these disorders, enhancement of disease prediction, and advancement of prevention strategies.

The NIAMS Systemic Rheumatic and Autoimmune Diseases research area encompasses the following individual scientific programs:

- Arthritis Biology Program
- Rheumatic Diseases Integrative Biology Research Program
- Scleroderma, Fibrosis, and Autoinflammatory Disease Program
- Systemic Autoimmune Disease Biology Program

Bone Biology and Diseases. The programs comprising Bone Biology and Diseases cover the development of common and rare bone diseases; their prevention, diagnosis, and treatment; and approaches to understanding the genetic, molecular, and cellular mechanisms involved in bone biology. Research areas include the mechanisms of bone formation, resorption, and mineralization; the effects of hormones, growth factors, and other signaling molecules on these processes; genetics, genomics, and epigenetics of bone; bone fracture repair; bone imaging, and determinants of bone quality; and the interaction and communication of bone with other tissues and organs. The programs emphasize the application of fundamental knowledge of bone biology to the development of strategies to prevent bone diseases and bone fractures, as well as therapies for their treatment, while also supporting the characterization of the natural history of osteoporosis and rare bone diseases and disorders, with the ultimate goal of developing better prevention strategies, diagnostic tools, and treatment options for bone diseases.

The Bone Biology and Diseases research area encompasses the following individual scientific programs:

- Bone Biology, Metabolic Bone Disorders, and Osteoporosis Program
- Clinical, Integrative Physiology, and Rare Diseases of Bone Program

Muscle Biology and Diseases. The programs comprising Muscle Biology and Diseases support a wide range of basic, translational, and clinical research projects in skeletal muscle biology and diseases, with a focus on the fundamental biology of muscle development, physiology, and muscle imaging. Particular interests include the basic biology of satellite and muscle stem cells, excitation-contraction coupling, muscle metabolism, and adaptation of muscle to exercise. The programs address a need for translational research to develop discoveries that enhance treatment and improve management of muscle and musculoskeletal diseases and disorders with a focus on the interaction of muscle with other organs and tissues. The overarching objective is to advance the understanding of—and ultimately prevent and treat—muscular dystrophies, inflammatory myopathies, muscle ion channel diseases, and muscle disorders such as disuse atrophy and age-related loss of muscle mass.

The Muscle Biology and Diseases research area encompasses the following individual scientific programs:

- Muscle Development and Physiology Program
- Muscle Disorders and Therapies Program

Joint Biology, Diseases, and Orthopedics. The programs comprising Joint Biology, Diseases, and Orthopedics focus on understanding the fundamental biology of joints and their component tissues, and on translating this knowledge to a variety of diseases and conditions. Research includes the study of the causes and treatments of acute and chronic injuries—including fractures, tendon and ligament injury and repair, and low back pain—as well as clinical and epidemiological studies of osteoarthritis. The program supports developmental and functional investigations of articular cartilage, growth plate, tendons, ligaments, menisci, infrapatellar fat pad, and intervertebral discs, with emphasis on contrasting normal and pathogenic phenotypes. The technology development component includes methods for imaging bone and cartilage to improve the diagnosis and treatment of skeletal disorders, or to facilitate the repair of damage caused by trauma to otherwise healthy musculoskeletal tissues including bone, cartilage, tendon, ligament, intervertebral disc, and meniscus. Therapeutic approaches include drugs, nutritional interventions, joint replacement, bone and cartilage transplantation, and gene therapy. Tissue engineering, regenerative medicine, sports medicine, and musculoskeletal fitness are areas of special emphasis.

The Joint Biology, Diseases and Orthopedics research area encompasses the following individual scientific programs:

- Cartilage and Connective Tissue Program
- Clinical Osteoarthritis and Diagnostic Imaging Program
- Musculoskeletal Tissue Engineering and Regenerative Medicine Program
- Orthopaedic Implant Science Program
- Orthopaedic Research Program

Skin Biology and Diseases. The programs comprising Skin Biology and Diseases support a broad portfolio of basic, translational, and clinical research in skin. These efforts include work on the developmental and molecular biology of skin and skin appendages (such as the hair follicle), the study of skin as an immune organ, and the genetics of skin diseases. Areas of particular emphasis include investigations of stem cells found in skin; studies related to wound healing and fibrosis; heritable disorders of connective tissue (such as Marfan's syndrome); studies related to itch; metabolic studies of skin, such as the effects of hormones and the role of enzymes in skin barrier formation; and immunologically mediated cutaneous disorders, such as atopic dermatitis, contact dermatitis, and vasculitis. Research is underway to better understand keratinizing and inflammatory disorders such as psoriasis and ichthyosis; disorders of pigmentation such as vitiligo; and bullous diseases such as pemphigus, pemphigoid, and epidermolysis bullosa. Other studies encompass acne and the physiologic activity of the sebaceous glands, as well as disorders of the hair, such as alopecia areata. The NIAMS also pursues a deeper understanding of the basic biology of skin functions, new approaches for developing artificial skin, and advances in imaging technologies for diagnosis and tracking of skin disease progression.

The Skin Biology and Diseases research area encompasses the following individual scientific programs:

- Epidermis, Dermis and Skin Senses Program
- Skin Immunology and Diseases, Skin Microbiome Program
- Skin Repair, Pigmentation and Appendages, Vasculature/Lymphatic Systems Program

==== Office of Extramural Operations ====
This Office within the DER manages the NIAMS grants policies and procedures, including oversight of grants administration, scientific review, and clinical management functions. It serves as the primary liaison for the NIAMS with the NIH Office of Extramural Research and with other Institutes that share research interests. The Office handles scientific integrity and ethical questions in research and manages the NIAMS Advisory Council, a congressionally mandated second tier of the NIH peer review system.

The Scientific Review Branch (SRB) conducts the initial peer review of specific research applications assigned to the NIAMS. These include applications for Centers, program projects, single and multi-site clinical trials, scientific conferences, training and career development awards, as well as applications responding to initiatives published by the NIAMS including contract solicitations. Members of the scientific community are selected to serve as peer reviewers.

The Grants Management Branch (GMB) works with scientists and institutional research administrators to issue, manage, and close out awards. The branch has legal responsibility for the fiscal management of the institute's extramural grants.

The Clinical Management Team (CMT) provides logistical and operational support for the institute's clinical trial activities. The CMT assesses study risk, implementing data and safety monitoring oversight, tracking enrollment progress, and mitigating study related issues for the complete portfolio of NIAMS funded clinical trials and select human subject observational studies with some level of risk. The CMT also implements NIH policies pertaining to clinical trials, in addition to being subject matter experts on Federal Policies for Protection of Human Subjects and FDA regulations.

=== Intramural Research ===
The NIAMS Intramural Research Program (IRP) consists of: Office of the Scientific Director, Office of the Clinical Director, Autoimmunity Branch, Clinical Trials and Outcomes Branch, Community Research and Care Branch, Dermatology Branch, Laboratory of Molecular Immunogenetics, Laboratory of Muscle Stem Cells and Gene Regulation, Laboratory of Oral Connective Tissue Biology, Laboratory of Skin Biology, Laboratory of Structural Biology Research, Molecular Immunology and Inflammation Branch, Office of Science and Technology, Pediatric Translational Research Branch, Protein Expression Laboratory, Systemic Autoimmunity Branch, Rheumatology Fellowship and Training Branch, and the Career Development and Outreach Branch

==== Office of the Scientific Director ====
The Office of the Scientific Director is responsible for the development of broad decisions concerning program planning, budget and policy formulation, and resource allocation of the intramural program. The Scientific Director represents the NIAMS in discussions of NIH-wide intramural policies and programs and serves as the principal advisor to the Director of the NIAMS concerning all ongoing and projected intramural research programs.

==== Office of the Clinical Director ====
The Office of the Clinical Director implements innovative clinical research programs that relate to the broad fields of rheumatologic, musculoskeletal, and skin disorders. Through specific programs in clinical research, rheumatology fellowships and advanced training in translational medicine, and health partnerships, the Office of the Clinical Director plays an important role in establishing cutting-edge therapeutic paradigms, in providing medical education in the field of rheumatology, and in reaching out to the community to reduce health care disparities and to improve the understanding of rheumatic and related diseases. The Translational Genetics and Genomics Unit in the Office of the Clinical Director focuses on understanding the mechanisms that underlie human inflammatory disease. Using an approach that integrates genomics, bioinformatics, and mechanistic investigations, the program aims to identify the causes of genetically complex autoinflammatory diseases, including systemic juvenile idiopathic arthritis and Behçet's disease.

The Clinical Trials and Outcomes Branch conducts research on the health outcomes of patients with rheumatic diseases and orthopaedic conditions. Studies focus on the development and testing of measures of health and disease, identification of predictors of good and poor health outcomes, examination of treatment effectiveness, and investigations of socioeconomic and ethnic disparities in health outcomes. The Clinical Trials and Outcomes Branch also conducts studies on the outcomes of many important orthopaedic conditions. The studies use large clinical databases to investigate rare femur fractures, uncommon hip infections, and novel fracture treatments, as well as studying rare, genetic bone diseases. The goal is to provide clinical insights into conditions that cannot be examined in traditional clinical studies.

The Community Research and Care Branch coordinates activities within the NIAMS Community Health Clinic, a health information resource that provides health care services to underserved populations affected by arthritis, lupus, and other rheumatic diseases. The clinic offers patient care with access to specialists, education programs, and referral to clinical investigations for the prevention and treatment of rheumatic diseases.

The Autoimmunity Branch conducts basic and clinical research on the pathophysiology and treatment of autoimmune diseases. Signal transduction pathways that differentiate normal and pathological immune responses are studied in mouse models and human tissue samples to gain insights into how these processes drive autoimmune diseases, and how therapies that minimize generalized immune suppression can best be developed for these diseases.

The Branch focuses on the TNF-family of cytokines and their receptors, from basic investigation of the trafficking and signaling by these molecules to the study of human diseases involving TNF-family cytokines and their receptors. The Branch also studies intracellular signaling and how this leads to immune-mediated disease. Individuals with known or currently undiagnosed rare genetic syndromes are evaluated by genetic and biochemical investigations.

The Dermatology Branch investigates fundamental and clinical aspects of neoplastic and inflammatory skin disease as well as normal skin function, while also providing all dermatology patient care at the NIH Clinical Center. The Branch includes research focused on clinical and translational research in rare disease populations, including new clinical syndromes and trials of new therapies, and houses three sections devoted to cutaneous research areas. The Branch studies signaling pathways that regulate development and maintenance of normal skin, and the changes in these signals that occur during the formation of skin cancer. One area of focus is skin sensory neuroendocrine cells, Merkel cells, and the pathogenesis and treatment of Merkel cell carcinoma (MCC). An important area of research for the Branch includes investigation of the skin microbiome in health and disease. The Branch also aims to extend knowledge of interactions of immune cells in skin and skin appendage niches, combining mouse genetics, bioinformatics, immunology and cell biology. Closely related is the Laboratory of Skin Biology, which conducts research on the regulation of epidermal differentiation, skin barrier formation, and inflammatory responses associated with barrier dysfunction. A major focus is basic investigation of ectodermal appendage development and the study of human ectodermal dysplasias.

The Laboratory of Molecular Immunogenetics conducts research on B lymphocytes focusing on the regulation of gene expression and chromatin organization in normal cells and in the setting of cancer.

The Laboratory of Muscle Stem Cells and Gene Regulation investigates the cellular and molecular mechanisms that regulate differentiation and regeneration of skeletal muscle in physiological and pathological conditions. The ultimate goal of these studies is to provide a conceptual, as well as practical, framework for the diagnosis and treatment of human diseases affecting skeletal muscle. The Lab also focuses on dissecting the composition of ribonucleoproteins involved in cellular RNA transport and control of RNA stability, and inflammatory and autoimmune human muscle disease as well as the basic biology of skeletal muscle regeneration.

The Laboratory of Oral Connective Tissue Biology studies the molecular biology of dental-oral-craniofacial development, with a focus on the teeth, gums, and related jaw structure. The aim of these studies is to understand cells and signals influencing tooth, bone, and periodontal ligament development in order to identify improved regenerative strategies.

The Laboratory of Structural Biology Research conducts research into the structural basis of the assembly and functioning of macromolecules and their complexes (such as viruses and cytoskeletal proteins), and the mechanisms and proteins that control their assembly. These studies make extensive use of cryoelectron microscopy and three-dimensional image processing in studies of virus infection and replication; renewal of the epidermis, with maintenance of barrier function; prionogenesis (structural transitions of infectious proteins called prions); and intracellular protein quality control by energy-dependent proteases.

The Molecular Immunology and Inflammation Branch conducts basic and clinical investigations of the molecular mechanisms underlying immune and inflammatory responses in rheumatic and autoimmune diseases. A major focus is the study of receptor-mediated signal transduction and how these processes link to the regulation of genes involved in inflammatory responses.

The Office of Science and Technology encompasses an infrastructure of research and support facilities designed to enhance the research capabilities of all IRP scientists. In addition, staff members advise the Scientific Director, Laboratory and Branch Chiefs, and other key officials on collaborative and cooperative activities, training programs, and proper use of laboratory animals. Staff members also negotiate and facilitate scientific collaborations that involve trans-Institute and trans-NIH initiatives and agreements. The Office includes the following:

- The Flow Cytometry Section provides state-of-the-art multiparameter analytic and cell sorting capabilities for IRP investigators.
- The Laboratory Animal Care and Use Section supports all IRP Branches and Laboratories that utilize animal models in their research initiatives.
- The Light Imaging Section offers IRP scientists access to light imaging equipment and expertise in light microscopy techniques.
- The Biodata Mining and Discovery Section assists with computational and bioinformatics approaches to support NIAMS intramural research.
- The Translational Immunology Section provides NIAMS investigators with services, consultative advice, and in-depth instructions in a variety of immunologic methods to interpret immunoassays.

The Pediatric Translational Research Branch conducts basic, translational, and clinical research to dissect the pathways involved in the pathogenesis of immune-mediated inflammatory diseases. The mechanisms by which specific gene mutations and polymorphisms predispose to inflammation, and how they contribute to unique phenotypic manifestations of individual diseases, are being investigated using a variety of approaches.

The Protein Expression Laboratory plans and conducts research on the expression, purification, and structural characterization of human immunodeficiency virus (HIV) and HIV-related proteins. Laboratory scientists also collaborate with NIH intramural researchers studying the structure and function of HIV and HIV-related proteins. The Lab serves as a support and resource group for the expression and purification of these proteins.

The Systemic Autoimmunity Branch focuses on unraveling the fundamental mechanisms that lead to the development and perpetuation of systemic autoimmune disorders, particularly systemic lupus erythematosus (SLE) and rheumatoid arthritis (RA), and their associated organ damage. By identifying the mechanisms of tissue damage in SLE and RA, the Branch is exploring whether specific pharmacologic interventions that block identified pathways can mitigate complications in these and other immune disorders. The Vasculitis Translational Research Program based in the Systemic Autoimmunity Branch develops clinical and translational research initiatives across many types of systemic vasculitis. The program's key objectives include comprehensive clinical evaluation of patients with known or suspected vasculitis, assessment of vascular inflammation through imaging studies, discovery of novel biomarkers through genomic profiling, and clinical trials of novel therapeutics. The program works closely with the NIH Clinical Center and has established an ongoing collaboration with the international NIH-funded Vasculitis Clinical Research Consortium.

The Rheumatology Fellowship and Training Branch is dedicated to the clinical and research training of physicians wishing to pursue careers in biomedical or translational research related to rheumatic diseases. Led by the NIAMS, the NIH Rheumatology Training Program is two years in duration with extensions available for individuals interested in advanced research training as NIAMS Scholars in Translational Medicine. The program is accredited by the Accreditation Council for Graduate Medical Education (ACGME), and graduates are eligible to sit for the certifying examination in the subspecialty of rheumatology.

The Career Development and Outreach Branch advises the Scientific Director, Laboratory and Branch Chiefs, and other key officials within the NIAMS IRP on current and potential training programs; coordinates resources available for NIAMS fellows and their sponsors; and works in partnership with existing NIAMS and NIH components to ensure the quality of incoming trainees at the postdoctoral, post-baccalaureate, and graduate student levels. In addition, the Branch leads Institute career outreach activities, administers the summer internship program, and supports the annual NIAMS Intramural Scientific Training.
