= Nastaran Zahir =

American bioengineer

- Education: University of California, Berkeley; University of Pennsylvania
- Scientific career
- Fields: Bioengineering, cancer research
- Workplaces: National Institutes of Health

Nastaran Zahir is an American bioengineer serving as the acting director of the National Cancer Institute Center for Cancer Training.

== Education ==
Zahir earned a Bachelor of Science in nuclear engineering from the University of California, Berkeley while a research scientist at the Lawrence Berkeley National Laboratory in the areas of plasma physics and radiation biology and imaging.

She completed a Ph.D. in bioengineering from the University of Pennsylvania at the Institute for Medicine and Engineering where she investigated spatial-mechanical regulation of mammary morphogenesis and therapeutic resistance. Her postdoctoral training was at the National Institute of Arthritis and Musculoskeletal and Skin Diseases where she studied stem cell biology in the context of tissue engineering and regenerative medicine.

== Career ==
Zahir joined National Cancer Institute (NCI) in 2009 as a program director and project scientist in the Office of Physical Sciences-Oncology. She served as associate director at the NCI Division of Cancer Biology from 2013 to 2021 where she coordinated interdisciplinary programs that integrate physical sciences and engineering perspectives and approaches with cancer research.

Zahir is the acting director of the NCI center for cancer training and branch director of the cancer training branch. Zahir leads strategic initiatives for training in cancer research and designs operational frameworks for a portfolio of over a thousand fellowships, training grants, research education, and career development programs with annual NCI investments of over $230 million. In 2023, Zahir was inducted as a fellow of the American Institute for Medical and Biological Engineering.

Zahir has taught undergraduate courses in cancer biology at the University of Pennsylvania and graduate courses in tissue engineering and regenerative medicine at the National Institutes of Health's Foundation for Advanced Education in the Sciences (FAES).
