= Dahir, Fujairah =

Dahir
- Location within United Arab Emirates
- Coordinates: 25°32′0″N 56°9′0″E
- Country: United Arab Emirates
- Emirate: Fujairah
- Elevation: 356 m (1,168 ft)

Dahir is the name of a settlement in Fujairah.

Wadi al-Lahbah (25.54494°N 56.15483°E) is nearby which has two pools that are of interest for their regional heritage species. In particular, there are several species of dragonfly and damselfly of interest including Ischnura evansi, Anax imperator, Orthetrum ransonnetii, and Trithemis arteriosa.
