= Stephen I. Katz =

American physician

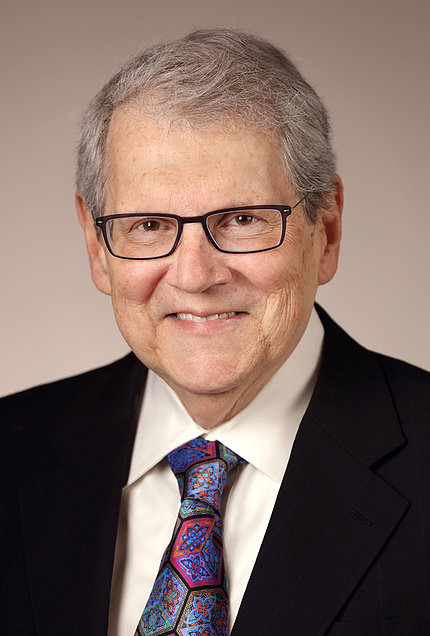
- Katz in 2017
- Born: 1941; New York, U.S.
- Died: December 20, 2018 (aged 77)
- Education: University of Maryland, College Park; Tulane University School of Medicine; University of London
- Children: 3
- Scientific career
- Fields: Immunodermatology
- Workplaces: National Institutes of Health; Uniformed Services University of the Health Sciences

Stephen Ira Katz (1941 – December 20, 2018) was an American immunodermatologist who served as the director of the National Institute of Arthritis and Musculoskeletal and Skin Diseases from 1995 to 2018. He was the Marion B. Sulzberger Professor of Dermatology at the Uniformed Services University of the Health Sciences from 1989 to 1995.

== Early life and education ==
Katz was born in New York in 1941. Katz attended Bethesda-Chevy Chase High School. He graduated with honors from the University of Maryland, College Park. He completed a M.D. at Tulane University School of Medicine with honors in 1966. He conducted a medical internship at the Los Angeles County Hospital and did his dermatology residency at the University of Miami Medical Center from 1967 to 1970. He served in the U.S. military at Walter Reed Army Medical Center from 1970 to 1972. From 1972 to 1974, Katz did a postdoctoral fellowship at the Royal College of Surgeons of England and obtained a Ph.D. in immunology from the University of London in 1974.

== Career ==
Katz then became senior investigator in the dermatology branch of the National Cancer Institute (1974–2014) and assumed the position of acting chief in 1977. In 1980, he became chief of the branch, a position he held until 2002.

In 1989, Katz also assumed the position of Marion B. Sulzberger Professor of Dermatology at the Uniformed Services University of the Health Sciences, a position that he held until 1995.

Katz focused his studies on immunology and the skin. His research demonstrated that skin is an important component of the immune system both in its normal function and as a target in immunologically-mediated disease. In addition to studying Langerhans cells and epidermally-derived cytokines, Katz and his colleagues investigated inherited and acquired blistering skin diseases. Katz trained a large number of immunodermatologists in the U.S., Japan, Korea, and Europe.

Katz was a former president of the Society for Investigative Dermatology, The International League of Dermatological Societies, and the International Committee of Dermatology.

In 1995, the NIH director, Harold E. Varmus selected Katz as the second director of National Institute of Arthritis and Musculoskeletal and Skin Diseases (NIAMS). He served as director from August 1995 until he died on December 20, 2018.

== Awards and honors ==
He was a recipient of the Order of the Rising Sun. He had honorary membership in the American Academy of Dermatology and the Society for Investigative Dermatology. Katz was elected to the National Academy of Medicine. He received Doctor Honoris Causa Degrees from Semmelweis University, LMU Munich, the University of Athens, and University College Dublin. Katz received the Distinguished Executive Presidential Rank Award. In honor of Katz, the National Institutes of Health has established the Stephen I. Katz Early Stage Investigator Research Project Grant.

== Personal life ==
Katz was married to Linda. He had three children. Katz died suddenly on December 20, 2018.

== Notable Trainees ==
Thomas J. Lawley (former Dean of Emory University School of Medicine); Kevin D. Cooper (Chair of Dermatology at Case Western Reserve University School of Medicine), S. Wright Caughman (former Executive Vice President of Health Affairs at Emory University School of Medicine), Russell Hall (former Chair of the Department of Dermatology at Duke University School of Medicine), Kunihiko Tamaki (former Chair of the Department of Dermatology at the University of Tokyo), Brian S. Kim (Professor and Vice Chair of Dermatology at Mount Sinai Health System).
