= Bill Copeland (sailor) =

Canadian sailor

Bill Copeland (8 December 1928 – 2017) was a Canadian sailor who competed in the 1952 Summer Olympics.
