= Immunodermatology =

Immunodermatology studies skin as an organ of immunity in health and disease. Several areas have special attention, such as photo-immunology (effects of UV light on skin defense), inflammatory diseases such as Hidradenitis suppurativa, allergic contact dermatitis and atopic eczema, presumably autoimmune skin diseases such as vitiligo and psoriasis, and finally the immunology of microbial skin diseases such as retrovirus infections and leprosy. New therapies in development for the immunomodulation of common immunological skin diseases include biologicals aimed at neutralizing TNF-alfa and chemokine receptor inhibitors.

== Testing sites ==
There are multiple universities currently do Immunodermatology:

- University of Utah Health.
- University of North Carolina.

== See also ==
- Dermatology
- Immune response
