= Rehabilitation counseling =

Counseling process

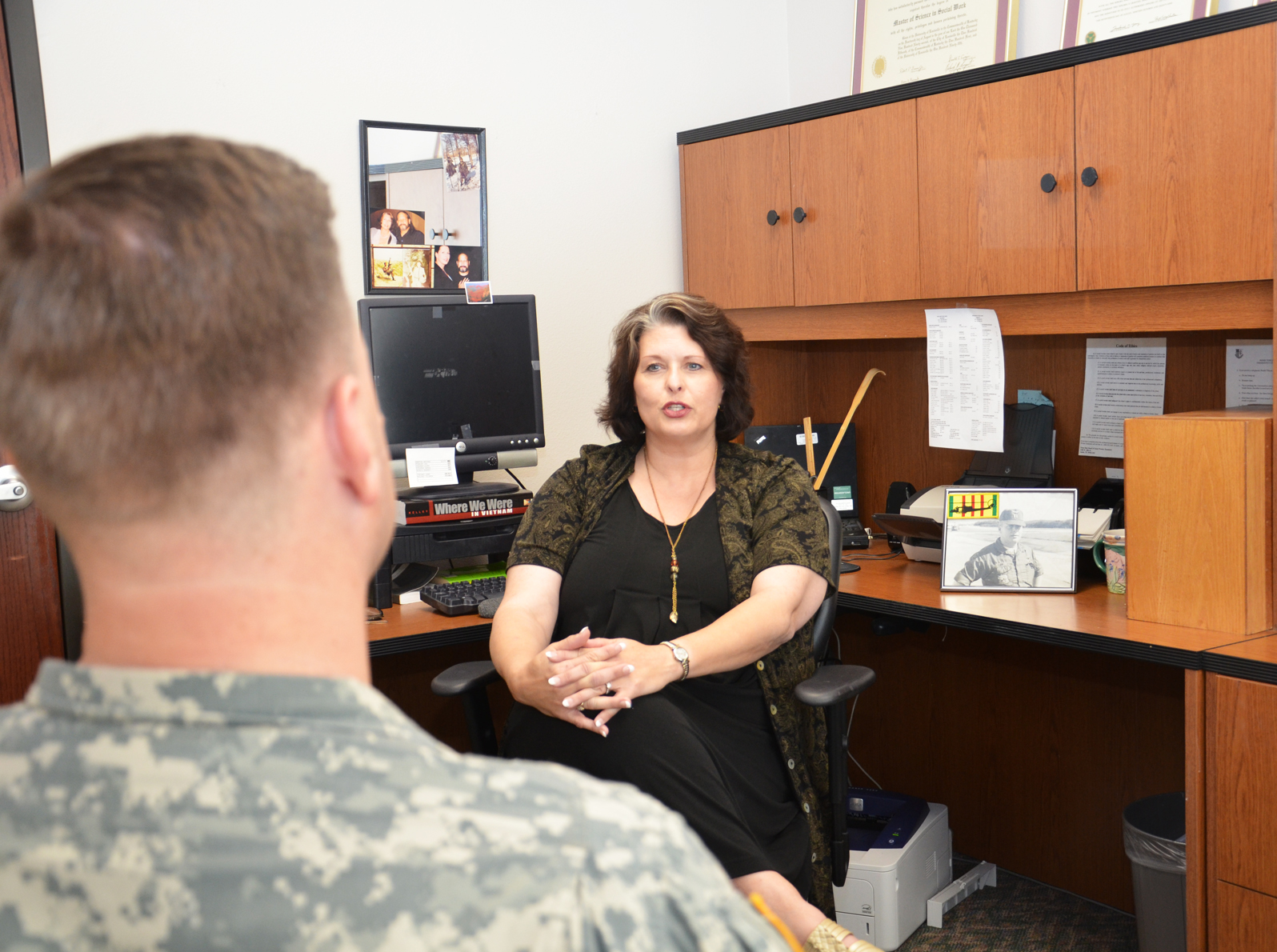
A counselor working with her patient in her office

Rehabilitation counseling is counseling people with physical, mental, emotional or cognitive disabilities and chronic illness to achieve their personal, social, educational, career, independent living goals.

Rehabilitation counselors can be found in private practice, in rehabilitation facilities, hospitals, universities, schools, government agencies, insurance companies and other organizations where people are being treated for congenital or acquired disabilities. Over time, with the changes in social work being more psychotherapy-oriented, rehabilitation counselors take on more and more community engagement work, especially as it relates to special populations. Some rehabilitation counselors focus solely on community engagement through vocational services, others in various states qualify as both a certified rehabilitation counselor (CRC) and a licensed professional counselor (LPC), enabling them to focus on psychotherapy.

== History ==
=== United States ===
Historically, rehabilitation counselors primarily served working-age adults with disabilities. Today, the need for rehabilitation counseling services extends to persons of all age groups who have disabilities. Rehabilitation counselors also may provide general and specialized counseling to people with disabilities in public human service programs and private practice settings.

Initially, rehabilitation professionals were recruited from a variety of human service disciplines, including public health nursing, social work, and school counseling. Although educational programs began to appear in the 1940s, it was not until the availability of federal funding for rehabilitation counseling programs in 1954 that the profession began to grow and establish its own identity.

==== Education and training ====
Though no specific undergraduate degree is required, the majority of rehabilitation counseling graduate students have undergraduate degrees in rehabilitation services, psychology, sociology, or other human services-related fields. As a master's degree is required at a minimum, rehabilitation counselors are trained at the graduate level, with most earning a master's degree, and a few continuing on to the doctoral level. The Council on Rehabilitation Education (CORE) formerly accredited qualifying rehabilitation counselor education programs, but the Council for Accreditation of Counseling and Related Educational Programs (CACREP) assumed this function in 2017. Not all programs meet accreditation requirements. Graduates of unaccredited programs may experience difficulty applying for state licensure and national certification. Rehabilitation counselors are trained in the following areas:

- Individual and group counseling
- Medical and psychosocial information
- Problems and community engagement of special populations
- Evaluation and assessment
- Research utilization
- Employment and occupational choice
- Case and caseload management
- Job development and placement

Accredited rehabilitation counselor education programs typically provide 60 credit hours of academic and field-based clinical training. Clinical training consists of at least a semester of practicum and a minimum of 600 hours of supervised internship experience. Clinical field experiences are available in a variety of community, state, federal, and private rehabilitation-related programs.

==== Professional certification and licensure ====
Some states have requirements for licensure, scopes of practice, and other regulations regarding the practice of Rehabilitation Counseling in some settings. For example to provide services in a school as a Rehabilitation Counselor in New Mexico, you must have a license from the New Mexico Department of Public Education.

Some US States and Territories have Licensed Rehabilitation Counselors (LRC), some of which places LRCs at the same level as other licensed social service professionals. In other states the CRC qualifies the rehabilitation counselor to obtain the Licensure as a Professional Counselor (LPC). Certification is highly desirable to many employers.

The Commission on Rehabilitation Counselor Certification (CRCC) grants certification to counselors who meet educational requirements and have passed an examination indicating that they possess the competency and skill to become a Certified Rehabilitation Counselor, (CRC in the United States; CCRC in Canada). A Master's degree is required to obtain certification.

Credentialling as a Certified Rehabilitation Counselor or eligibility to sit for the certification exam is mandated by federal law for those wishing to work for federal vocational rehabilitation systems at Veteran Affairs.

==== Social relevancy ====
Community service to a culturally and ethnically diverse population, professional functions, critical thinking, advocacy, applied research activities, and ethical standards are integrated throughout rehabilitation counselor preparation and development. Though rehabilitation counselors are adept at understanding medical issues surrounding the disability (as proven by certification/licensure), they are trained in the social model of disability, which identifies systemic barriers, negative attitudes and exclusion by society (purposely or inadvertently) that mean society is the main contributory factor in disabling people. Rehabilitation Counselors are often advocates in the community for people with disabilities outside of the workplace, with most doing some form of community engagement. As a good portion of counselors have disabilities themselves, the counseling process often emphasizes self-advocacy skills. Rehabilitation counselors can be found in the leadership of many prominent organizations that support human rights and civil rights for people with disabilities such as American Coalition of Citizens with Disabilities, National Black Deaf Advocates, etc.

===== Notable rehabilitation counselors =====
- Antonia Darder Aguilo – Public Intellectual, Leavey Presidential Endowed Chair in Ethics and Moral Leadership in the School of Education at Loyola Marymount University
- Bill Copeland – Award-winning Poet
- Laurence M. Foley – American Diplomat to Jordan
- Patricia Gerard – First female Mayor of Largo, FL
- Juan de Dios Ramírez Heredia – Spanish Romani politician
- Al Jarreau – Grammy-winning Jazz Musician
- Young Woo Kang – First Korean man with vision impairment to earn a PhD, Creator of braille alphabet for the Korean language
- Robert Kelly – Navy Veteran, Film-inspiration
- Kathleen Kenna – Canadian Journalist in Afghanistan
- Erin Pac – U.S. Olympic Bobsledder, 2010 Bronze-medal winner
- Dianne Primavera – U.S. Legislator for the state of Colorado
- Kathleen Hawk Sawyer – Former Director of U.S. Federal Bureau of Prisons
- Alberta Banner Turner – First African-American woman to earn a PhD in Psychology from The Ohio State University

== Rehabilitation counseling careers ==
=== Careers in the profession ===
In the United States, many rehabilitation counselors work in a variety of arenas. The predominant placement of rehabilitation counselors are state rehabilitation programs as Vocational Counselors, social service agencies as Administrators, and at the collegiate level as Disability Counselors/Specialists:

==== State rehabilitation programs ====
The predominant need for rehabilitation counselors is within federal/state funded vocational rehabilitation programs. While the Veterans Benefits Administration has its own vocational rehabilitation program, the rest of Federal/State Vocational Rehabilitation Programs are funded and regulated by the Rehabilitation Services Administration (RSA), a division of the U.S Department of Education. Although policies vary from state to state, rehabilitation counselors who work in the federal/state systems typically must hold a master's degree in rehabilitation counseling, special education or a related field, and are required to be certified or be eligible to sit for the certification examination. People accepting employment in the federal/state Vocational Rehabilitation programs do so with the agreement they will meet these qualifications by a specified date to maintain employment.

==== Social service agencies and the corporate sector ====
Rehabilitation Counselors can work in the non-profit/corporate sector in various ways. Though the majority start as counselors, specializing in career counseling, most rehabilitation counselors that work in the non-profit arena rise to the administration level, either in supervising staff or directing programs for people with disabilities. Others supervise staff that work in case management programs that serve people with disabilities. Some rehabilitation counselors work with Independent Living Centers, doing community engagement, advocacy, outside referrals, and social service provision for people with disabilities. Entrepreneurial rehabilitation counselors also work as consultants, establishing their own private service agencies. Counselors in working with corporations focus on community relations or corporate service, serving as liaisons between companies and charities or service programs.

==== College disability counselors and specialists ====
By law all community colleges, colleges and universities are required to make reasonable accommodations for students with disabilities. To satisfy this requirement most collegial settings have a Disability Resources Center, a Special Needs Coordinator or a similar office. Staff are responsible for coordinating services that may include but are not limited to: advocacy/liaison, computer access, counseling (academic, personal, vocational), equipment loan, information/referral services, in-service awareness programs, notetakers, on campus orientation and mobility training for visually impaired students, priority registration assistance, readers, scribes, shuttle (on-campus), sign language interpreters, test proctoring/testing accommodations, and tutors.

Some adaptive technological accommodations may include but are not limited to: Adaptive computer technology (including voice activated and speech output), Assistive listening devices, Films/videotapes about disabilities, Kurzweil personal reader, Large print software, Print enlargers (CCTV), Raised-line drawing kit, Tactile map of campus, Talking calculators, Tape recorders/APH Talking Book Machine, TDD for hearing impaired, Wheelchair, Wheelchair access maps.

Students who have documentation proving their disability status and the staff are trained to access or have knowledge of the necessary services according to the students' unique need. As the college level is different from the primary school system, the same services that a student may have received within a special education program in high school may not be required at the collegiate level. A wide variety of students with disabilities can be served, some examples are individuals with: learning disabilities, sensorial disabilities (hearing loss, vision loss, etc.), physical disabilities (cerebral palsy, etc.) and psychological disabilities.

==== Forensic rehabilitation counselors ====
Forensic rehabilitation counselors can work as consultants, serving as witnesses and advocates in the legal profession. Forensic rehab counselors serve as legal advisors with specialized information on disability in the areas of higher education access, Social Security, marital dissolution, personal injury, and Worker's Compensation.

According to a survey of 1,220 Certified Rehabilitation Counselors (CRC) conducted by the Commission on Rehabilitation Counselor Certification (CORE), CRCs working within a forensic/expert witness job function have the highest annual salary ($93,000) of all job functions analyzed. Furthermore, when average salaries were analyzed by primary work setting, CRCs working within business or industry have the highest annual salary ($78,000) of all settings listed, which is $30,000 more than CRCs working in state/federal rehabilitation agencies. High annual salaries in the forensic area may be a key attraction for CRCs seeking to transition from the public sector. Academic programs require a graduate degree from an accredited rehabilitation counseling program, and enable the student to: learn about the role that counselors provide within the legal system; gain expertise in the ethical standards expected of expert witnesses; learn about the processes followed within legal cases when testifying on one's expert opinion; gain an understanding of the business aspects of a forensic counselor's work that breed success in this area of specialization.

== Growth of the field ==
=== Job outlook ===
As of 2024 there were 91,900 working in the field. Jobs for rehabilitation counselors are expected to grow by 1 percent from 2024 to 2034, slower than the average for all occupations.

=== Professional development ===
Professional organizations for rehabilitation counselors include the American Rehabilitation Counseling Association (a chartered division of the American Counseling Association since 1958), National Rehabilitation Counseling Association and American Rehabilitation Action Network. The Commission on Rehabilitation Counselor Certification (CRCC) does a lot of work in organizing rehabilitation counselors that pursue the professional advancement. CRCC offers specialty certifications in the field including Certified Rehabilitation Counselor (CRC), Certified Vocational Evaluation Specialist (CVE) and National Certified Rehabilitation Leadership Certification (CRL).

== See also ==
- Career development
- Commission on Accreditation of Rehabilitation Facilities
- European Platform for Rehabilitation
- Public service
- Social change
- Social development
