= Laurence Foley =

American diplomat (1942–2002)

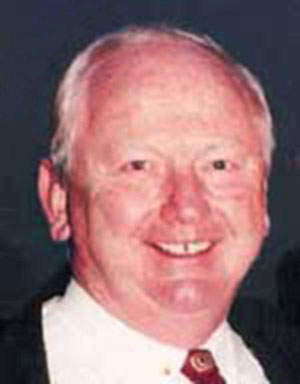
- Laurence M. Foley
- Born: October 5, 1942; Boston, Massachusetts, U.S.
- Died: October 28, 2002 (aged 60); Amman, Jordan
- Cause of death: Murder by gunshots

Laurence Michael Foley, Sr. (October 5, 1942 – October 28, 2002) was an American diplomat. He was murdered outside his home in Amman, Jordan in 2002.

== Biography ==
Born in Boston, Massachusetts, Foley became a Peace Corps volunteer in 1965, serving two years in India upon graduating from Boston State College, now University of Massachusetts. After earning a master's degree in Rehabilitation Counseling at San Francisco State University in 1969, he served as a probation officer in Contra Costa County, California. He later worked for the Peace Corps, serving as Associate Director of the Peace Corps program in the Philippines from 1980 to 1985. He served as Director of Administration at the Rehabilitation Services of Northern California until joining the United States Agency for International Development (USAID) in 1988. After working in Bolivia, Peru, and Zimbabwe, Foley became Supervisory Executive Officer of USAID/Jordan in 2000.

== Murder and aftermath ==
On the morning of October 28, 2002, Foley was killed by gunshots from a 9 mm pistol as he walked to his car outside his Amman home. On December 14, two men, Libyan Salem bin Suweid and Jordanian Yasser Freihat, were arrested and charged with killing Foley. According to the Jordanian government, the men were paid to kill Foley by Abu Musab al-Zarqawi, an Islamist militant leader, who at that time was the commander of the group named Jama'at al-Tawhid wal-Jihad. Though the men confessed, they later claimed they were forced to by Jordanian authorities.

In April 2004, the two men were sentenced to death for killing Foley. Zarqawi was sentenced to death in absentia for his role in the assassination, but was killed in a U.S. airstrike on June 7, 2006. Foley's assassins were executed on March 11, 2006. Another conspirator, Mohammed Ahmed Youssef al-Jaghbeer, was sentenced to death on July 13, 2009.
