= Nastaran Makaremi =

Iranian writer and documentary filmmaker

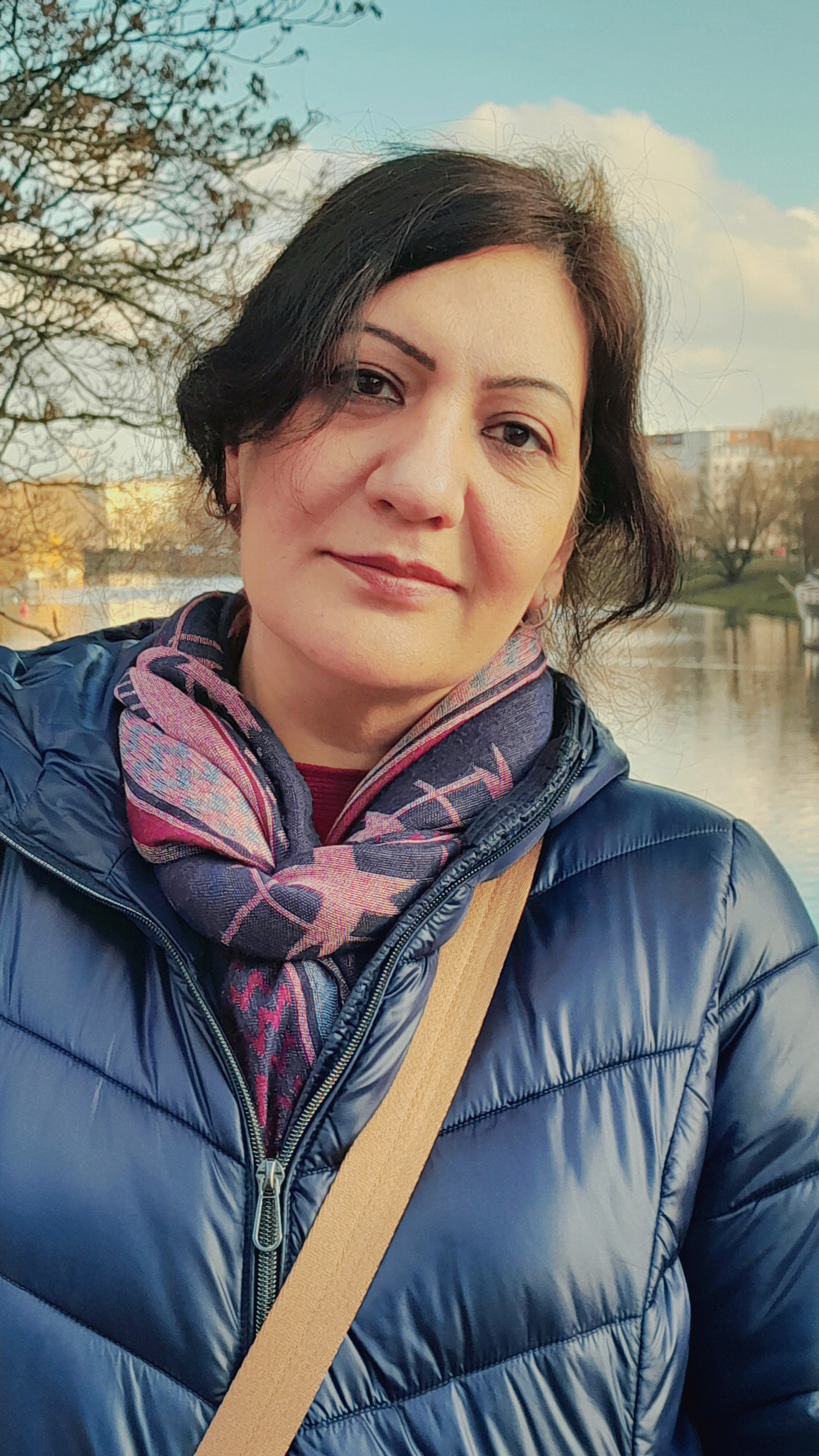
Nastaran Makaremi in Berlin, 2025

Nastaran Makaremi (born 1978) is an Iranian writer, journalist, and documentary filmmaker based in Berlin. She is best known for her literary fiction exploring memory, trauma, and exile, and has been featured in Persian-language media such as BBC Persian, IBNA, and Ketab News. Her works have received awards in Iran and abroad and have been translated into other languages, including German.

== Early life and education ==
Makaremi was born in Abadan, Iran, in 1978. She holds a bachelor's degree in Fine Arts (2001), which informed her interdisciplinary work in visual arts and literature.

== Career ==
=== Teaching and arts ===
Between 2001 and 2009, she taught painting, Islamic art, Persian miniature, and art history at institutions in Tehran and Isfahan. She also works in photography, performance-based storytelling, and environmental art.

=== Journalism and literary criticism ===
From 2010 to 2014, Makaremi contributed book reviews and cultural criticism to Iranian newspapers including Etemaad, Bahar, and Farhikhtegan. In 2013, she received the Tehran Seasonal Journalism Award for Best Book Review.

=== Literary work ===
Makaremi is the author of multiple novels and short story collections. Her writing often addresses the psychological effects of loss, silence, and generational trauma.

Her short story, Occupied House, won the South Story Literary Award and was later profiled by BBC Persian in a 2021 feature that highlighted her focus on displacement and women's inner worlds. The story was also translated into German and published by the German literary platform Weiter Schreiben.

Her novel, Total (2020) was described by Ketab News as "a daring and psychological dissection of buried family history in modern Iran." The novel was also a finalist for the Mehregan Literary Prize.

=== Notable publications ===
Novels

- Ordibehesht Deadlock (2015) – Qoqnoos
- Soiree After the Funeral (2017) – Butimar (Finalist, Bushehr Literary Prize)
- Bergamot of Sun (2017) – teen novel commissioned by the National Carpet Center of Iran
- Total (2020) – Saless (Finalist, Mehregan Prize)
- Distress Stages (2024) – Saline

Short stories

- No One Is Good (2014)
- Pink Dust (2018)
- Occupied House – Winner, South Story Literary Award; published in German

Poetry

- Hell Candy – poetry collection

=== Documentary filmmaking ===
Makaremi's nonfiction work includes two documentaries:

- Snow and Fire (2020) – on oil transportation in remote areas of Iran, commissioned by the National Iranian Oil Pipeline and Telecommunications Company
- Stones and Signs – exploring cultural heritage and rituals

== Recognition and awards ==
- DAAD Artist Fellowship, Berlin
- Winner, Tehran Journalist Award (2013)
- Winner, South Story Literary Award – *Occupied House* (2016)
- Finalist, Tirgan Canada Literary Award – *Sabroo* (2017)
- Finalist, Bushehr Literary Prize – *Soiree After the Funeral* (2019)
- Winner, Jamalzadeh Literary Award – *Zele Zalil* and *Tahereh’s Trauma* (2020)
- Finalist, Mehregan and MA Literary Prizes – *Total* (2022)
- Selected for International Human Rights Artists Festival (IHRAF) – *Sabroo* (2021)

== Advocacy ==
Makaremi has organized public campaigns calling for the release of imprisoned Iranian writers (2018 and 2021), and in 2022 she helped coordinate a writers’ declaration in support of the Women, Life, Freedom movement.
