= Bill Copeland (poet) =

American writer

- Born: Lilburn, Georgia, U.S.
- Died: October 19, 2010 (aged 64); Lilburn, Georgia, U.S.
- Occupations: Poet; writer; historian

Bill Copeland was an American poet, writer and historian. He was born at the Emory University Hospital in 1946. He was raised in DeKalb County, Georgia and lived above his father's country store. During the 1970s Copeland earned his master's degree in rehabilitation counseling from the University of Georgia. Copeland has held many jobs throughout his life consisting of a probation counselor, a parole officer in Augusta, and also a disability adjudicator for people seeking social security in Atlanta. He then started his own private practice before retiring in 1995 at the age of 49. It wasn't until after his retirement that Copeland began to write. He was a member of the Georgia Writers Association, the National Writers Association, and Libros International. Copeland lived in Lilburn Georgia throughout his adult years. He died 19 October 2010 due to complications from liver failure. Bill Copeland is remembered by his wife, Kathy Copeland, as well as his daughter, Lily Copeland

== Awards ==
Despite Bill Copeland's short career as a writer, he was able to win many awards for his writings. In 2006 Copeland won the National Writers Association Contest. In 2008 Copeland won the AmazonClicks.com Authors Choice Award for his novel Ashes to the Vistula. Copeland then went on to receive the Taran Family Memorial Award for historical fiction. He was elected a nominee for Georgia Author of the Year in 2008. Geri Taran, the creator of the Taran Family Memorial Award, said that "In Ashes to the Vistula the first person approach to the novel was so real that the story could easily be mistaken for a painful memoir. Perhaps it is an affirmation of the human spirit's ability to empathize that the novel was conceived and written by an author with a passion for historical clarity. A successful writing indeed. It is my honor and pleasure to recognize Ashes to the Vistula and Bill Copeland for his outstanding achievement in Historical Fiction."

== Works ==
Copeland was a man of many passions; however, some of his favorite things to write about were the Holocaust, World War II, Native Americans and many other topics. He was a historian and that aspect reveals itself in many of his works. It was not easy for Copeland to get his works published as he did countless research online, joined different writing groups and talked with fellow writers. He was finally able to find a publisher out of Spain that liked his first novel, Ashes to the Vistula. In 2007, Libros International went on to publish this novel as well as his second one, Desert Peoples Trilogy.

=== Poetry ===
Below are a list of Bill Copeland's Poetry:

SEEK THE NIGHT

Seek the night; find solace in shadows and observe a quieter world free of probing eyes and questioning stares...

THE LAST CANDLE

I watch the candles burn slowly with their flickering light, giving softness to the gaiety of the evening. One-by-one they flicker their last flame, signaling the end of the night, the bleakness of the season...

WINDS OF THOUGHT

It's in the wind and can be seen in things bending to please, shaped by force. A tree, gnarled and twisted, points to the wind's goal bowing after this majesty...

- Lonely Watch
- Clouds
- Ride the Roads
- Daisy
- Run, Daisy, Run
- Birds in a Field
- Owl Doth Fly
- Do You Remember
- Helen
- The Rose
- Gentle Memory
- Man as an Island
- Dawn
- Moving Times
- Infinite Thoughts
- A Soul Rising
- No More Roses
- Finding Strength
- Lonely Call

=== Novels ===
Ashes to the Vistula (2007) is perhaps Copeland's most well known novel. It was his first novel published and won multiple awards. It is a story about two boys that are taken to Auschwitz and forced to overcome hardships together despite the hardships that they already face.

"Desert People's Trilogy" was Copeland's second novel to be published and it won him the National Writer's Association Novel Contest. This is a unique trilogy that represents the white man's takeover of the Native American tribes.

Hindu Moon is Copeland's third novel and it depicts a story of both romance, mystery, and tragedy.

=== Holocaust poetry ===
As a historian it is obvious that Bill Copeland took great interest in the horror that was the Holocaust. This is evident through his use of descriptive language and vivid imagery that he uses in holocaust poems.

A Dark Pall A dark pall hangs over the earth time sanity vanished replaced with ruthlessness unimaginable evil. Tyrants rose from the muck cloaked in black, adorning death heads stone faces masking evil hiding sinister intentions. Ruses perpetuated disarming many innocents shading villainous intentions a final solution...

The Ruse Down from the train the ruse begins words of cheer amid the guards facing guns fearing dogs. To the showers the ruse portrays no diseases here crowding together walking slowly on the ashes of kin...

Other famous holocaust poets are Mahmoud Darwish and Martin Niemoller.

== Interviews ==
Copeland uses vivid details in all of his poems, especially the holocaust ones, and part of the reason for this is his extensive research that he put into whatever he was talking about. With regards to his holocaust poetry Copeland not only did plenty of research on the Holocaust and WWII, but he also was able to get a primary source perspective from actual soldiers that fought in the war. He interviewed both a US Army and a US Navy veteran and took what he learned and turned it into poetry.

Copeland's first interview was with Private First Class Russell Scott, a member of the 802nd Field Artillery Battalion. It becomes obvious where Copeland got his gruesome dialect for his poems as during part of the interview PFC Russell Scott states that: "What did I think when I saw them? I vomited. [He holds his hands together to form a circle about three inches in diameter.] Their legs weren't any bigger than this. I didn't know people could live like that. It's sickening to this day. The worst was Nordhausen, near Halle, Germany. It was a death camp, with the bodies stacked like cord wood. That was sickening, and the local people said they didn't know it was happening, but they knew. They couldn't have not known. They knew." -Private First Class Russell Scott

PFC Scott goes on to talk about the rest of the war and how seeing these horrible things prevented him from staying in the army.

In Copeland's second interview with Petty Officer Bill York of the US Navy, it becomes clear where a lot of the emotional aspects to the poetry comes from. Throughout the interview Officer York comes off as a tough character who doesn't seem to show emotion until he brings up his brother. "At that time, he learned his only brother had been wounded in Normandy on D-Day, but had been taken to Paris for recuperation. "Then I learned he had been killed at Bastogne in the Battle of the Bulge. Johnny's death was the greatest personal loss in my life, and still is today."-Petty Officer Bill York

For the rest of the interview Officer York shows just how emotional war can make even the toughest people seem.

Bill Copeland's third interview was with Corporal Theodore Suroweic, a member of the 747th Tank Battalion. In this interview Suroweic goes into great detail about how much preparation it took to get to the point where they were ready for battle. Suroweic talks about the rough trip over and how he had no idea what lay ahead of him. The interview takes a huge turn when he starts going into detail about landing on the beach and all of the death that was around him. It seemed everything was on fire; tanks, trucks, everything.... I remember seeing the bodies of soldiers, all lined up with their boots sticking straight up; a lot of bodies; our guys. They were lying all over the beach, and some were still floating in the water."-Corporal Theodore Suroweic

Not only does this interview depict the agony of having to watch ones fellow soldiers being slaughtered, but also how it feels to be personally brutalized. The fire had burned my clothes and I was lying there mostly naked with burns all over my body. There was no bleeding or pain, which had to be a blessing at the time, but my left leg was shattered. I knew I was in trouble when I looked at it. I remember thinking, "What a mess it was in". -Corporal Theodore Suroweic

This interview provides another rare first person perspective into what it was like to live through this war as a soldier. Copeland incorporates much of this into his holocaust poetry.

== Critiques ==
Author Sandra J. Cropsey on Ashes to the Vistula "Mr. Copeland could have bombarded his readers with one atrocity after another," she wrote, "but instead he carefully controls the story while at the same time giving his readers a glimpse into the misery and inhumanity of the Holocaust enough to remind us that we should never forget history, lest we surely repeat it."

Author Philip Spires on Ashes to the Vistula: "This is one of the strengths of Bill Copeland's book. It has an immediacy, a present that it is uncomplicated by received hindsight. On many issues, Bill Copeland leaves the jury out, enabling the reader to empathise with the dilemmas that confronted wartime and immediate post-war experience. This is the book's subtlety. Though it is primarily plot-led, the plot is genuinely surprising, ultimately engaging and, in a few late chapters, both confronts and rounds off several themes that the reader has registered throughout the narrative."
