= Abdul Zahir (Guantanamo Bay detainee 753) =

Afghan Guantanamo Bay detainee

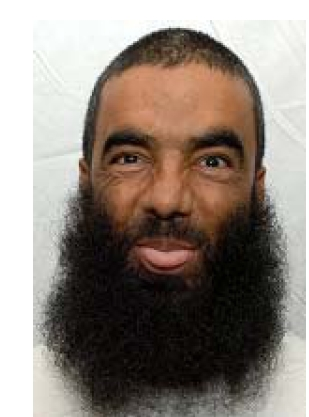
- Abdul Zahir's Guantanamo ID portrait
- Born: 1972 (age 53–54); Logar Province, Afghanistan
- Detained at: Guantanamo
- ISN: 753
- Charge: War crimes charges against Mr. Zahir have been dismissed
- Status: "Temporarily" transferred to Oman

Abdul Zahir (عبدالظاهر; born 1972) is a citizen of Afghanistan, who was held in extrajudicial detention in the United States' Guantanamo Bay detention camps, in Cuba. He was the tenth captive, and the first Afghan, to face charges before the first Presidentially authorized Guantanamo military commissions. After the US Supreme Court ruled that the President lacked the constitutional authority to set up military commissions, the United States Congress passed the Military Commissions Act of 2006. He was not charged under that system.

Zahir was approved for transfer on July 11, 2016. On January 17, 2017, four days before the inauguration of Donald Trump, ten men were transferred from Guantanamo, while American and Omani officials declined to identify the men, Abdul Zahir's lawyer told the Associated Press that he had been released.

== Background ==
Abdul Zahir was transferred to Guantanamo on October 28, 2002.

Zahir was charged with conspiracy, aiding the enemy and attacking civilians in connection with the grenade attack that wounded Canadian reporter Kathleen Kenna. Kenna wrote an op-ed about her feelings about Abdul Zahir's trial on December 27, 2009. She wrote that she and her companions weren't interested in retribution. She wrote that she hoped Abdul Zahir got a truly fair trial. She wrote that she and her companions couldn't identify their attackers. According to historian Andy Worthington, author of The Guantanamo Files, Kenna's op-ed should have shamed the US Government.

After living in a war zone for months in Afghanistan, and closely following the war’s progress since then, we have strong convictions that any prisoner-of-war should be treated with dignity, and afforded all the rights guaranteed by the Geneva Conventions and international human rights laws. It’s what we would demand for any Canadian, American or other citizen — whether combatant or aid worker — captured and held in a country of war. It’s what we want for Zahir and all the Guantánamo detainees. —Kathleen Kenna

== Official status reviews ==
Originally the Bush Presidency asserted that captives apprehended in the "war on terror" were not covered by the Geneva Conventions, and could be held indefinitely, without charge, and without an open and transparent review of the justifications for their detention. In 2004, the United States Supreme Court ruled, in Rasul v. Bush, that Guantanamo captives were entitled to being informed of the allegations justifying their detention, and were entitled to try to refute them.

=== Office for the Administrative Review of Detained Enemy Combatants ===
Combatant Status Review Tribunals were held in a 3x5 meter trailer where the captive sat with his hands and feet shackled to a bolt in the floor.

Following the Supreme Court's ruling the Department of Defense set up the Office for the Administrative Review of Detained Enemy Combatants.

According to The New York Times Guantanamo Docket Zahir had annual status reviews in 2004 and 2007. There is no record that he had an annual reviews in 2005, 2006 or 2008.

Scholars at the Brookings Institution, led by Benjamin Wittes, listed the captives still held in Guantanamo in December 2008, according to whether their detention was justified by certain common allegations:

- Abdul Zahir was listed as one of the captives who had faced charges before a military commission.
- Abdul Zahir was listed as one of the captives who had been charged before a Guantanamo military commission, and had subsequently had the charges dropped.
- Abdul Zahir was listed as one of the captives who "The military alleges ... are members of al-Qaeda."
- Abdul Zahir was listed as one of the captives who "The military alleges that the following detainees stayed in Al Qaeda, Taliban or other guest- or safehouses."
- Abdul Zahir was listed as one of the captives who was an "al Qaeda operative".
- Abdul Zahir was listed as one of the captives "who have been charged before military commissions and are alleged Al Qaeda operatives."
- Abdul Zahir was listed as one of the captives who "deny affiliation with Al Qaeda or the Taliban yet admit facts that, under the broad authority the laws of war give armed parties to detain the enemy, offer the government ample legal justification for its detention decisions."
- Abdul Zahir was listed as one of the captives who admitted "serving Al Qaeda or the Taliban in some non-military capacity."

=== Joint Review Task Force ===
Habeas corpus petition of Abdul Zahir

When he assumed office in January 2009 President Barack Obama made a number of promises about the future of Guantanamo. He promised the use of torture would cease at the camp. He promised to institute a new review system. That new review system was composed of officials from six departments, where the OARDEC reviews were conducted entirely by the Department of Defense. When it reported back, a year later, the Joint Review Task Force classified some individuals as too dangerous to be transferred from Guantanamo, even though there was no evidence to justify laying charges against them. On April 9, 2013, that document was made public after a Freedom of Information Act request. Abdul Zahir was one of the 71 individuals deemed too innocent to charge, but too dangerous to release. Although Obama promised that those deemed too innocent to charge, but too dangerous to release would start to receive reviews from a Periodic Review Board less than a quarter of men have received a review.

=== Formerly secret Joint Task Force Guantanamo assessment ===
On April 25, 2011, whistleblower organization WikiLeaks published formerly secret assessments drafted by Joint Task Force Guantanamo analysts. Joint Task Force Guantanamo drafted a 12 page assessment on November 19, 2008. Zahir's assessment recommended his continued detention under DoD control and was signed by camp commandant David M Thomas Jr.

== Charged before a military commission ==
Zahir was charged with conspiracy, aiding the enemy and attacking civilians in connection with the grenade attack that wounded Canadian reporter Kathleen Kenna. Kenna wrote an op-ed about her feelings about Abdul Zahir's trial on December 27, 2009. She wrote that she and her companions weren't interested in retribution. She wrote that she hopes Abdul Zahir has a truly fair trial. She wrote that she and her companions couldn't identify their attackers.

Abdul Zahir was transferred to Guantanamo on October 28, 2002.

The first hearing in Zaher's case was held on April 5, 2006. Although the rules for Military Commissions required the suspect to be given a copy of the charges against them in a language they could read, Zahir had not been given a translation. Officials could not explain why the hearing had been convened without hiring a Farsi translator, so Zahir could understand what was going on.

According to Jamil Dakwar, the director of the ACLU's Human Rights Program, an observer at Zahir's April 5 hearing, the military commission system "...is a deficient system rife with legal and procedural problems..." Dakwar noted that Zahir's hearing was the first when the Presiding Officer wore a black robe, like a civilian judge. He noted that the charge "conspiracy to commit war crimes" was not a crime recognized under any international law.

Zahir's second hearing was held on May 17, 2006. It was convened because Zahir sole defense attorney, Lieutenant Colonel Thomas Bogar, had filed a motion questioning whether the Presiding Officer Colonel Robert Chester should recuse himself due to inherent bias. Bogar dropped his motion, telling reporters later he was satisfied with the answers he received from Chester and the jury members.

== Transfer to Oman ==
On January 17, 2017, Oman accepted the transfer of ten men from Guantanamo. The names of the transferred men was withheld, by both American and Oman authorities. Oman officials said the men had been granted "temporary residence". Vermont lawyer David Sleigh, Zahir's pro-bono habeas attorney, told the Associated Press he was one of the transferred men.
