= Ritual =

Activities performed according to a set sequence

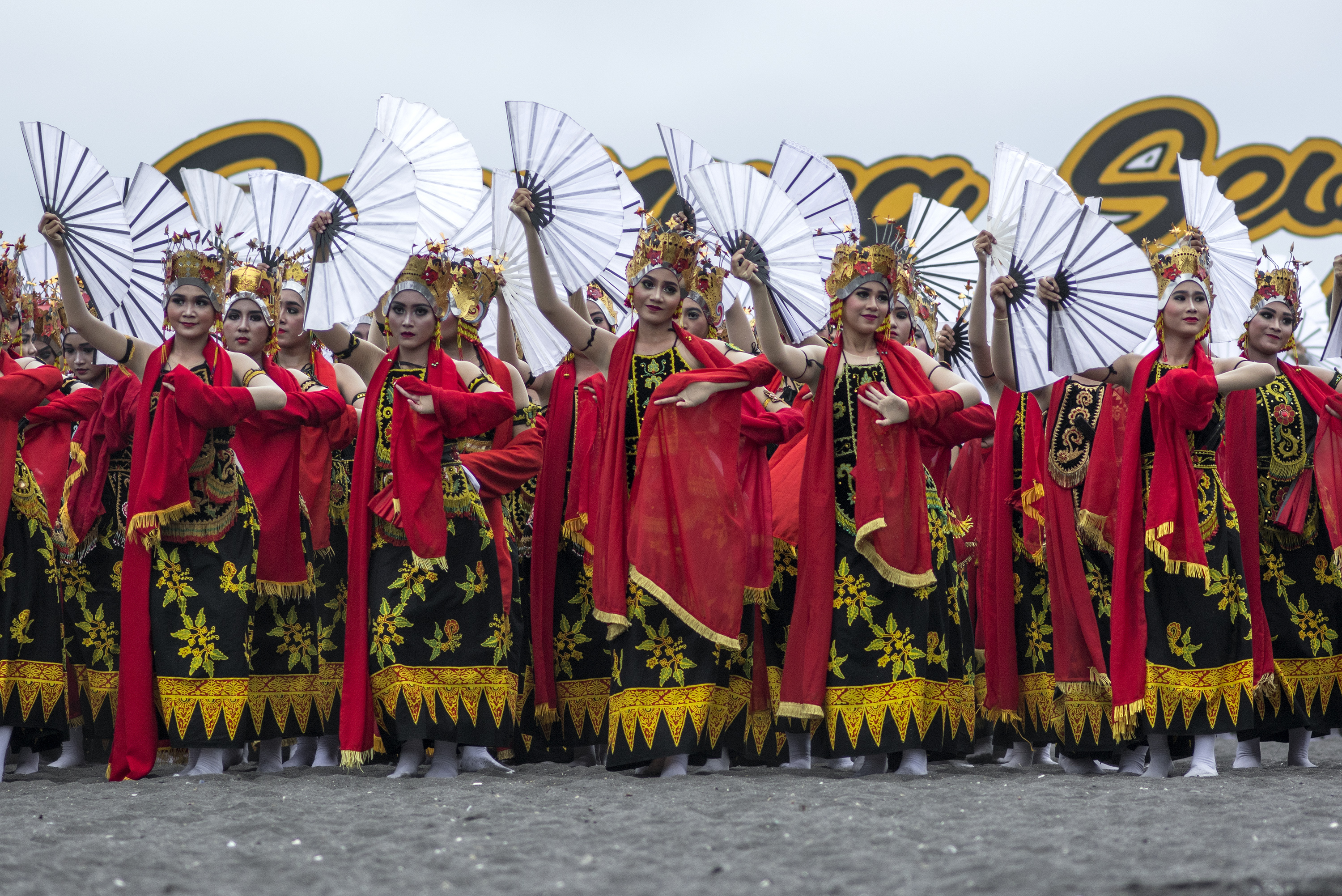
A Javanese ritual dance dedicated to the goddess of rice and fertility, Dewi Sri

A ritual is a repeated, structured sequence of actions or behaviors that alters the internal or external state of an individual, group, or environment, regardless of conscious understanding, emotional context, or symbolic meaning. Traditionally associated with gestures, words, or revered objects, rituals also occur in non-human species, such as elephant mourning or corvid object-leaving. They may be prescribed by tradition, including religious practices, and are often characterized by formalism, traditionalism, rule-governance, and performance.

Rituals are a feature of all known human societies. They include not only the worship rites and sacraments of organized religions and cults, but also rites of passage, atonement and purification rites, oaths of allegiance, dedication ceremonies, coronations and presidential inaugurations, marriages, funerals and more. Even common actions like hand-shaking and saying "hello" may be termed as rituals.

The field of ritual studies has seen a number of conflicting definitions of the term. One given by Kyriakidis is that a ritual is an outsider's or "etic" category for a set activity (or set of actions) that, to the outsider, seems irrational, non-contiguous, or illogical. The term can be used also by the insider or "emic" performer as an acknowledgement that this activity can be seen as such by the uninitiated onlooker.

In psychology, the term ritual is sometimes used in a technical sense for a repetitive behavior systematically used by a person to neutralize or prevent anxiety; it can be a symptom of obsessive–compulsive disorder but obsessive-compulsive ritualistic behaviors are generally isolated activities.

== Etymology ==
The English word ritual derives from the Latin ritualis, "that which pertains to rite (ritus)". In Roman juridical and religious usage, ritus was the proven way (mos) of doing something, or "correct performance, custom". The original concept of ritus may be related to the Sanskrit ṛtá ("visible order)" in Vedic religion, "the lawful and regular order of the normal, and therefore proper, natural and true structure of cosmic, worldly, human and ritual events". The word "ritual" is first recorded in English in 1570, and came into use in the 1600s to mean "the prescribed order of performing religious services" or more particularly a book of these prescriptions.

== Characteristics ==
There are hardly any limits to the kind of actions that may be incorporated into a ritual. The rites of past and present societies have typically involved special gestures and words, recitation of fixed texts, performance of special music, songs or dances, processions, manipulation of certain objects, use of special dresses, consumption of special food, drink, or drugs, and much more.

Catherine Bell argues that rituals can be characterized by formalism, traditionalism, invariance, rule-governance, sacral symbolism and performance.

=== Formalism ===
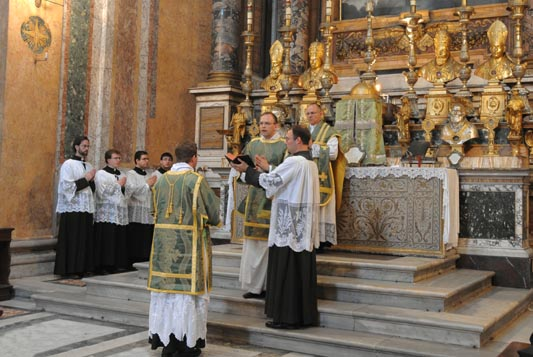
The use of Latin in a Tridentine Catholic Mass is an example of a "restricted code".

Ritual uses a limited and rigidly organized set of expressions which anthropologists call a "restricted code" (in opposition to a more open "elaborated code"). Maurice Bloch argues that ritual obliges participants to use this formal oratorical style, which is limited in intonation, syntax, vocabulary, loudness, and fixity of order. In adopting this style, ritual leaders' speech becomes more style than content. Because this formal speech limits what can be said, it induces "acceptance, compliance, or at least forbearance with regard to any overt challenge". Bloch argues that this form of ritual communication makes rebellion impossible and revolution the only feasible alternative. Ritual tends to support traditional forms of social hierarchy and authority, and maintains the assumptions on which the authority is based from challenge.

=== Traditionalism ===
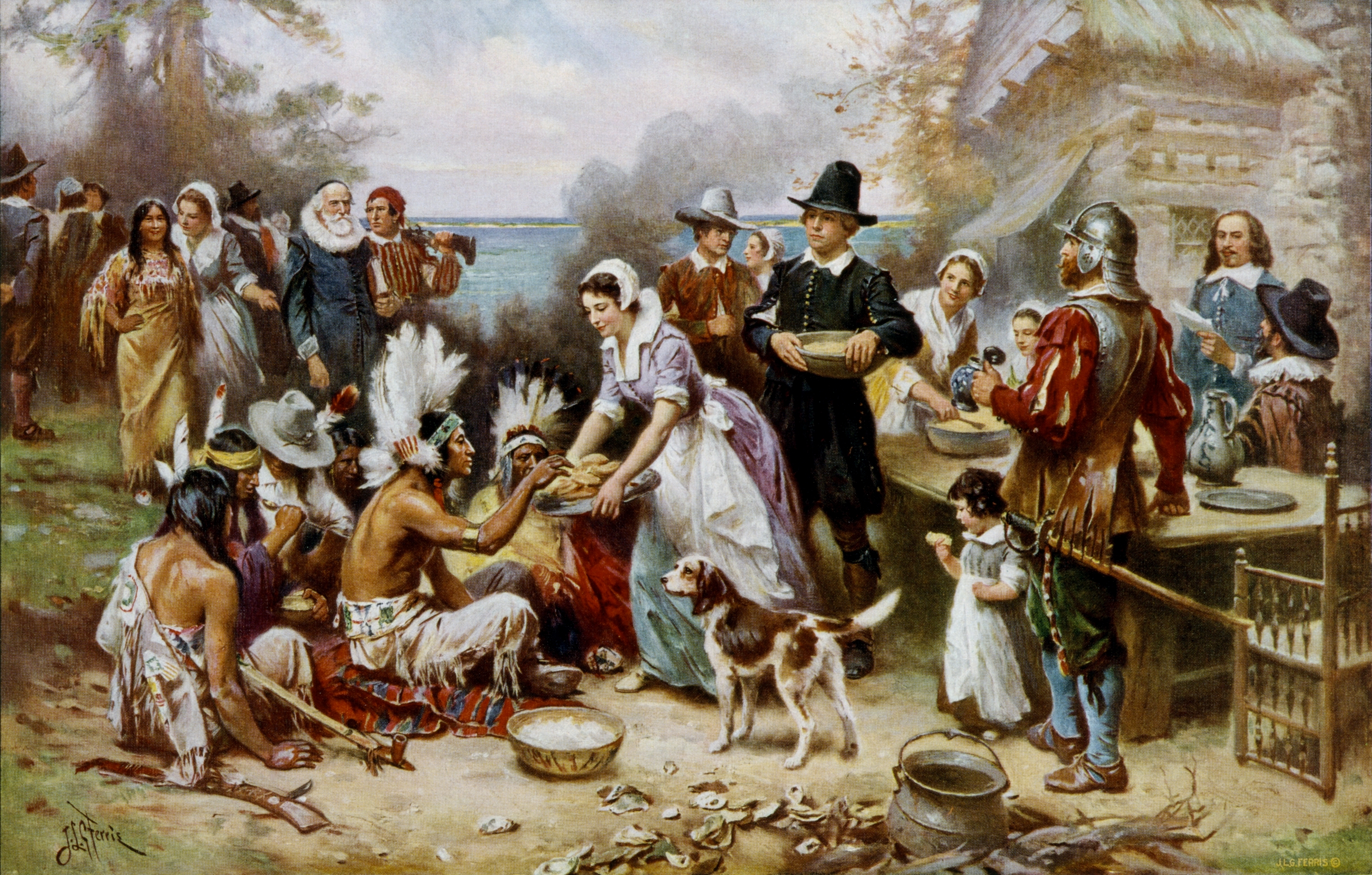
The First Thanksgiving 1621, oil on canvas by Jean Leon Gerome Ferris (1863–1930). The painting shows common misconceptions about the event that persist to modern times: Pilgrims did not wear such outfits, and the Wampanoag are dressed in the style of Plains Indians.

Rituals appeal to tradition and are generally continued to repeat historical precedent, religious rite, mores, or ceremony accurately. Traditionalism varies from formalism in that the ritual may not be formal yet still makes an appeal to the historical trend. An example is the American Thanksgiving dinner, which may not be formal, yet is ostensibly based on an event from the early Puritan settlement of America. Historians Eric Hobsbawm and Terrence Ranger have argued that many of these are invented traditions, such as the rituals of the British monarchy, which invoke "thousand year-old tradition" but whose actual form originate in the late nineteenth century, to some extent reviving earlier forms, in this case medieval, that had been discontinued in the meantime. Thus, the appeal to history is important rather than accurate historical transmission.

=== Invariance ===
Catherine Bell states that ritual is also invariant, implying careful choreography. This is less an appeal to traditionalism than a striving for timeless repetition. The key to invariance is bodily discipline, as in monastic prayer and meditation meant to mold dispositions and moods. This bodily discipline is frequently performed in unison, by groups.

=== Rule-governance ===
Rituals tend to be governed by rules, a feature somewhat like formalism. Rules impose norms on the chaos of behavior, either defining the outer limits of what is acceptable or choreographing each move. Individuals are held to communally approved customs that evoke a legitimate communal authority that can constrain the possible outcomes. Historically, war in most societies has been bound by highly ritualized constraints that limit the legitimate means by which war was waged.

=== Sacral symbolism ===
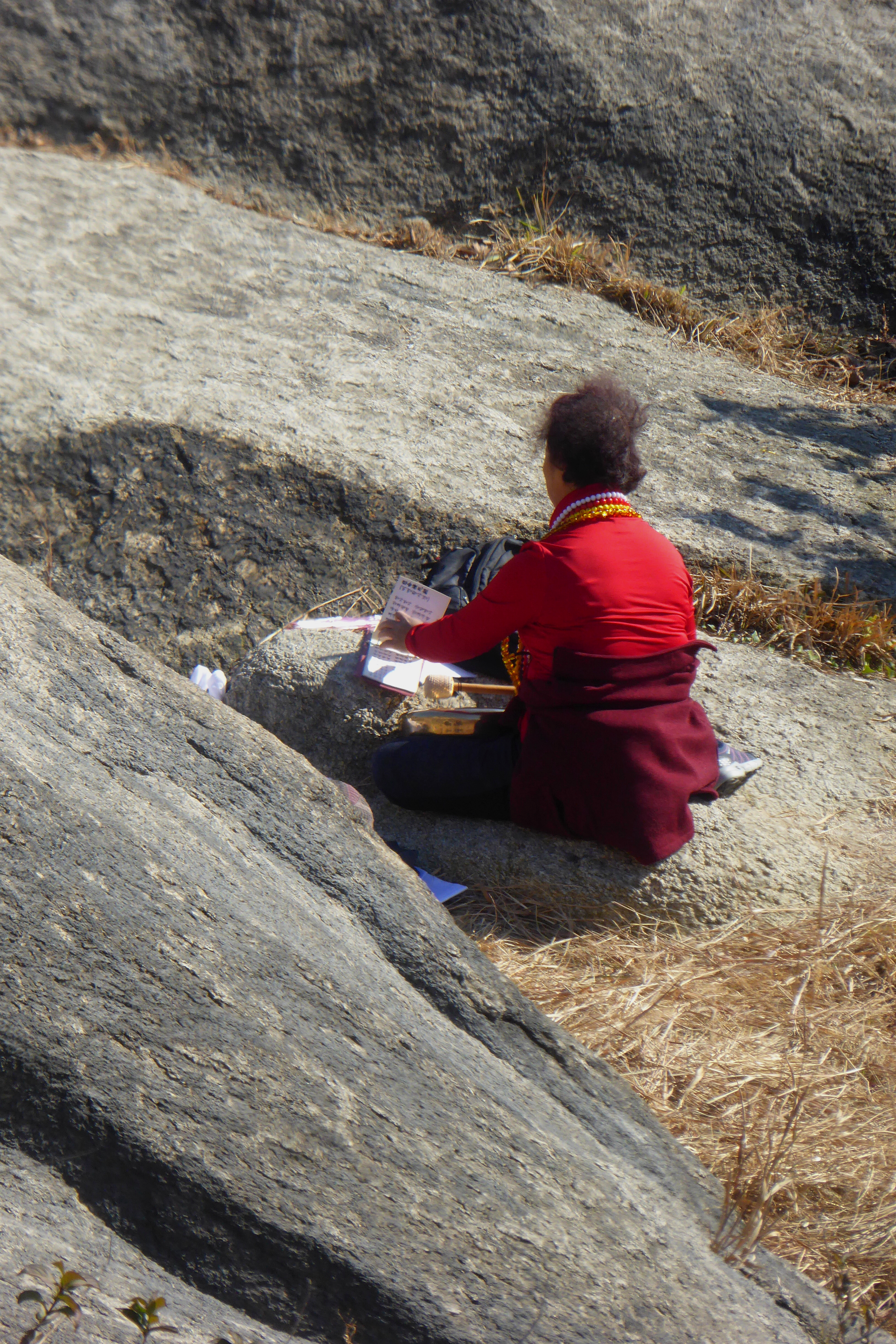
Ritual practitioner on Inwangsan Mountain, Seoul, South Korea

Activities appealing to supernatural beings are easily considered rituals, although the appeal may be quite indirect, expressing only a generalized belief in the existence of the sacred demanding a human response. National flags, for example, may be considered more than signs representing a country. The flag stands for larger symbols such as freedom, democracy, free enterprise or national superiority. Anthropologist Sherry Ortner writes that the flag:

does not encourage reflection on the logical relations among these ideas, nor on the logical consequences of them as they are played out in social actuality, over time and history. On the contrary, the flag encourages a sort of all-or-nothing allegiance to the whole package, best summed [by] 'Our flag, love it or leave.'

Particular objects become sacral symbols through a process of consecration which effectively creates the sacred by setting it apart from the profane. Boy Scouts and the armed forces in any country teach the official ways of folding, saluting and raising the flag, thus emphasizing that the flag should never be treated as just a piece of cloth.

=== Performance ===
The performance of ritual creates a theatrical-like frame around the activities, symbols and events that shape participant's experience and cognitive ordering of the world, simplifying the chaos of life and imposing a more or less coherent system of categories of meaning onto it. As Barbara Myerhoff put it, "not only is seeing believing, doing is believing."

The theatricality of ritual may overlap with performance art.

== Genres ==
For simplicity's sake, the range of diverse rituals can be divided into categories with common characteristics, generally falling into one three major categories:

- rites of passage, generally changing an individual's social status;
- communal rites, whether of worship, where a community comes together to worship, such as Jewish synagogue or Mass, or of another character, such as fertility rites and certain non-religious festivals;
- rites of personal devotion, where an individual worships, including prayer and pilgrimages, pledges of allegiance, or promises to wed someone.

However, rituals can fall in more than one category or genre, and may be grouped in a variety of other ways. For example, the anthropologist Victor Turner writes:

Rituals may be seasonal, ... or they may be contingent, held in response to an individual or collective crisis. ... Other classes of rituals include divinatory rituals; ceremonies performed by political authorities to ensure the health and fertility of human beings, animals, and crops in their territories; initiation into priesthoods devoted to certain deities, into religious associations, or into secret societies; and those accompanying the daily offering of food and libations to deities or ancestral spirits or both.

— Turner (1973)

=== Rites of passage ===
A rite of passage is a ritual event that marks a person's transition from one status to another, including adoption, baptism, coming of age, graduation, inauguration, engagement, and marriage. Rites of passage may also include initiation into groups not tied to a formal stage of life such as a fraternity. Arnold van Gennep stated that rites of passage are marked by three stages:

1. Separation
Wherein the initiates are separated from their old identities through physical and symbolic means.
2. Transition
Wherein the initiated are "betwixt and between". Victor Turner argued that this stage is marked by liminality, a condition of ambiguity or disorientation in which initiates have been stripped of their old identities, but have not yet acquired their new one. Turner states that "the attributes of liminality or of liminal personae ("threshold people") are necessarily ambiguous". In this stage of liminality or "anti-structure" (see below), the initiates' role ambiguity creates a sense of communitas or emotional bond of community between them. This stage may be marked by ritual ordeals or ritual training.
3. Incorporation
Wherein the initiates are symbolically confirmed in their new identity and community.

=== Rites of affliction ===
Anthropologist Victor Turner defines rites of affliction actions that seek to mitigate spirits or supernatural forces that inflict humans with bad luck, illness, gynecological troubles, physical injuries, and other such misfortunes. These rites may include forms of spirit divination (consulting oracles) to establish causes—and rituals that heal, purify, exorcise, and protect. The misfortune experienced may include individual health, but also broader climate-related issues such as drought or plagues of insects. Healing rites performed by shamans frequently identify social disorder as the cause, and make the restoration of social relationships the cure.

Turner uses the example of the Isoma ritual among the Ndembu of northwestern Zambia to illustrate. The Isoma rite of affliction is used to cure a childless woman of infertility. Infertility is the result of a "structural tension between matrilineal descent and virilocal marriage" (i.e., the tension a woman feels between her mother's family, to whom she owes allegiance, and her husband's family among whom she must live). "It is because the woman has come too closely in touch with the 'man's side' in her marriage that her dead matrikin have impaired her fertility." To correct the balance of matrilineal descent and marriage, the Isoma ritual dramatically placates the deceased spirits by requiring the woman to reside with her mother's kin.

Shamanic and other ritual may effect a psychotherapeutic cure, leading anthropologists such as Jane Atkinson to theorize how. Atkinson argues that the effectiveness of a shamanic ritual for an individual may depend upon a wider audiences acknowledging the shaman's power, which may lead to the shaman placing greater emphasis on engaging the audience than in the healing of the patient.

=== Death, mourning, and funerary rites ===
Many cultures have rites associated with death and mourning, such as the last rites and wake in Christianity, shemira in Judaism, the antyesti in Hinduism, and the antam sanskar in Sikhism. These rituals often provide a structured way for communities to grieve and honor the deceased. In Tibetan Buddhism, for example, the rituals described in the Bardo Thodol guide the soul through the stages of death, aiming for spiritual liberation or enlightenment. In Islam, the Janazah prayer is an communal act of grief. Indigenous practices, such as the Australian Aboriginal smoking ceremony, intended to cleanse the spirit of the departed and ensure a safe journey to the afterlife.

In many traditions can be found the belief that when man was first made the creator bestowed soul upon him, while the earth provided the body. In Genesis is offered the following description of the creation of man: "And the Lord God formed man of the dust of the ground, and breathed into his nostrils the breath of life; and man became a living soul". As a result at the moment of death each of the two elements needs to be returned to its source, the body returns to earth, while the soul to the heavenly creator, by means of the funerary ritual.

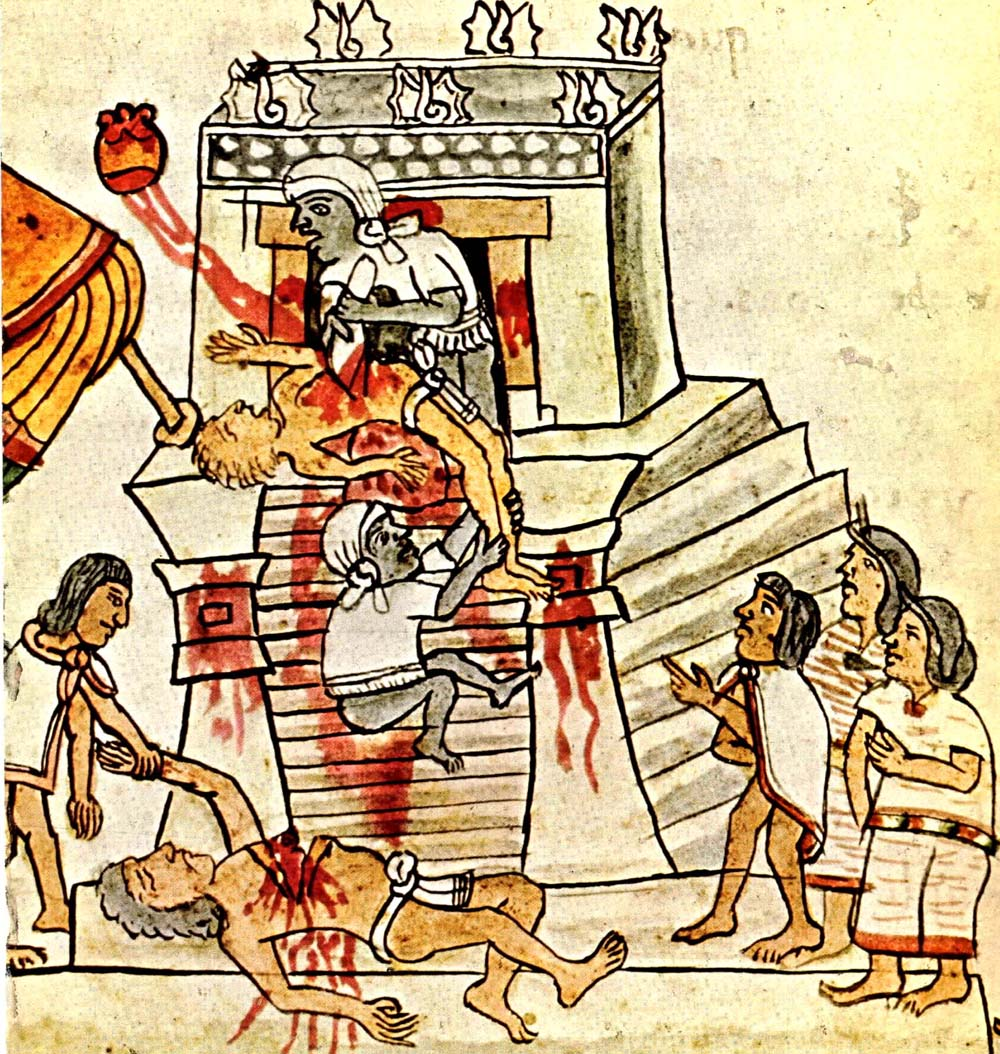
Aztec ritual human sacrifices, Codex Mendoza

=== Calendrical and commemorative rites ===
Calendrical and commemorative rites are ritual events marking particular times of year, or a fixed period since an important event. Calendrical rituals give social meaning to the passage of time, creating repetitive weekly, monthly or yearly cycles. Some rites are oriented towards a culturally defined moment of change in the climatic cycle, such as solar terms or the changing of seasons, or they may mark the inauguration of an activity such as planting, harvesting, or moving from winter to summer pasture during the agricultural cycle. They may be fixed by the solar or lunar calendar; those fixed by the solar calendar fall on the same day (of the Gregorian, Solar calendar) each year (such as New Year's Day on the first of January) while those calculated by the lunar calendar fall on different dates (of the Gregorian, Solar calendar) each year (such as Chinese lunar New Year). Calendrical rites impose a cultural order on nature. Mircea Eliade states that the calendrical rituals of many religious traditions recall and commemorate the basic beliefs of a community, and their yearly celebration establishes a link between past and present, as if the original events are happening over again: "Thus the gods did; thus men do."

=== Rites of sacrifice, exchange, and communion ===
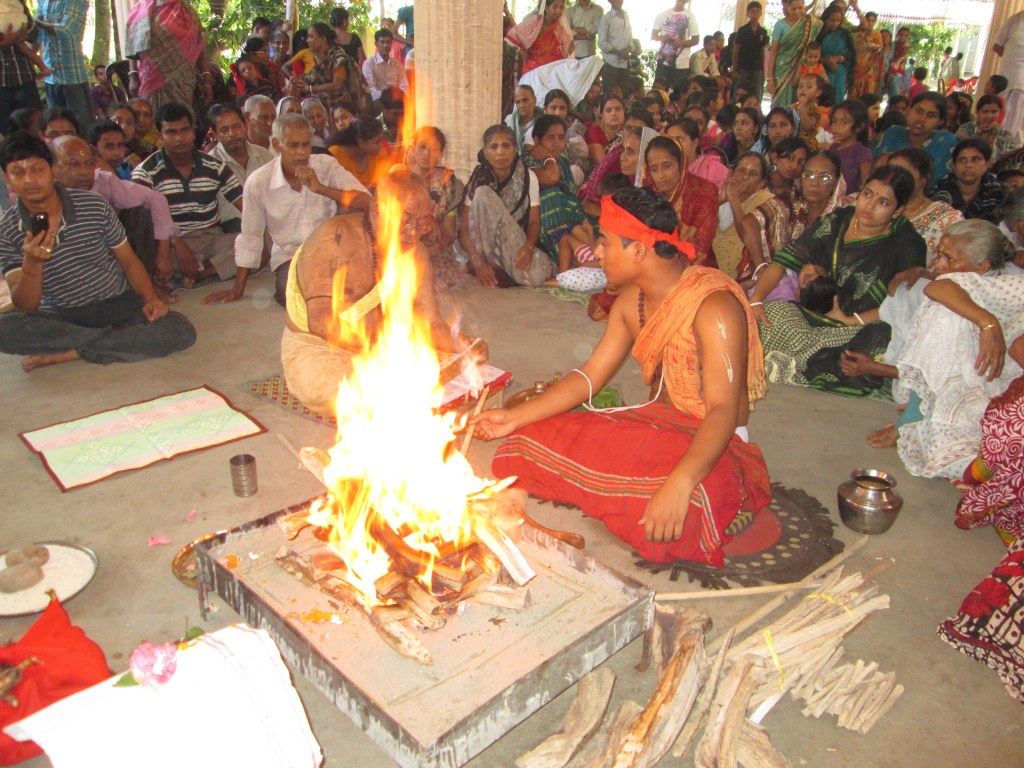
Deva yajna performed during Durga Puja in Bangladesh

This genre of ritual encompasses forms of sacrifice and offering meant to praise, please or placate divine powers. According to early anthropologist Edward Tylor, such sacrifices are gifts given in hope of a return. Catherine Bell, however, points out that sacrifice covers a range of practices from those that are manipulative and "magical" to those of pure devotion. Hindu puja, for example, appear to have no other purpose than to please the deity.

According to Marcel Mauss, sacrifice is distinguished from other forms of offering by being consecrated, and hence sanctified. As a consequence, the offering is usually destroyed in the ritual to transfer it to the deities.

=== Rites of feasting, fasting, and festivals ===
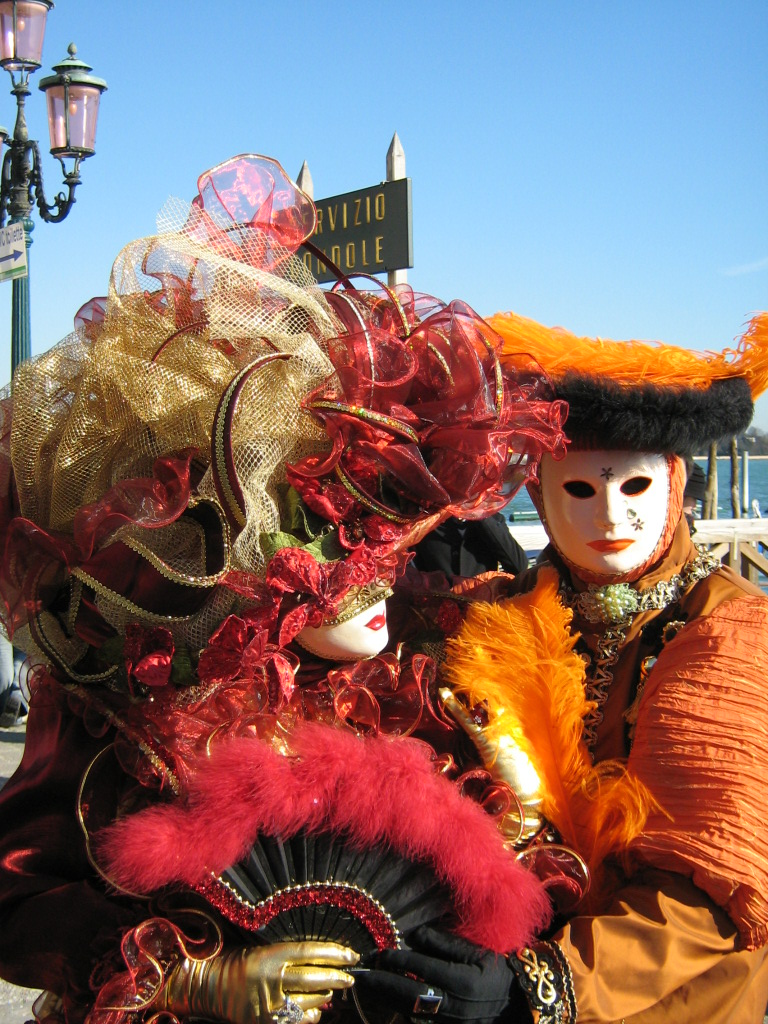
Masquerade at the Carnival of Venice

Rites of feasting and fasting are those through which a community publicly expresses an adherence to basic, shared religious values, rather than to the overt presence of deities as is found in rites of affliction where feasting or fasting may also take place. It encompasses a range of performances such as communal fasting during Ramadan by Muslims; the slaughter of pigs in New Guinea; Carnival festivities; or penitential processions in Catholicism. Victor Turner described this "cultural performance" of basic values a "social drama". Such dramas allow the social stresses that are inherent in a particular culture to be expressed and worked out symbolically in a ritual catharsis; as the social tensions continue to persist outside the ritual, pressure mounts for the ritual's cyclical performance. In Carnival, for example, the practice of masking allows people to be what they are not, and acts as a general social leveller, erasing otherwise tense social hierarchies in a festival that emphasizes play outside the bounds of normal social limits. Yet outside carnival, social tensions of race, class and gender persist, hence requiring the repeated periodic release found in the festival.

=== Water rites ===
A water rite is a rite or ceremonial custom that uses water as its central feature. Typically, a person is immersed or bathed as a symbol of religious indoctrination or ritual purification. Examples include the Mikveh in Judaism, a custom of purification; misogi in Shinto, a custom of spiritual and bodily purification involving bathing in a sacred waterfall, river, or lake; the Muslim ritual ablution or Wudu before prayer; baptism in Christianity, a custom and sacrament that represents both purification and initiation into the religious community (the Christian Church); and Amrit Sanskar in Sikhism, a rite of passage (sanskar) that similarly represents purification and initiation into the religious community (the khalsa). Rites that use water are not considered water rites if it is not their central feature. For example, having water to drink during or after ritual is common, but does not make that ritual a water ritual unless the drinking of water is a central activity such as in the Church of All Worlds waterkin rite.

=== Fertility rites ===
Fertility rites are religious rituals that are intended to stimulate reproduction in humans or in the natural world. A group of people performing such rites is a fertility cult. Such rites may involve the sacrifice of "a primal animal, which must be sacrificed in the cause of fertility or even creation".

=== Sexual rituals ===
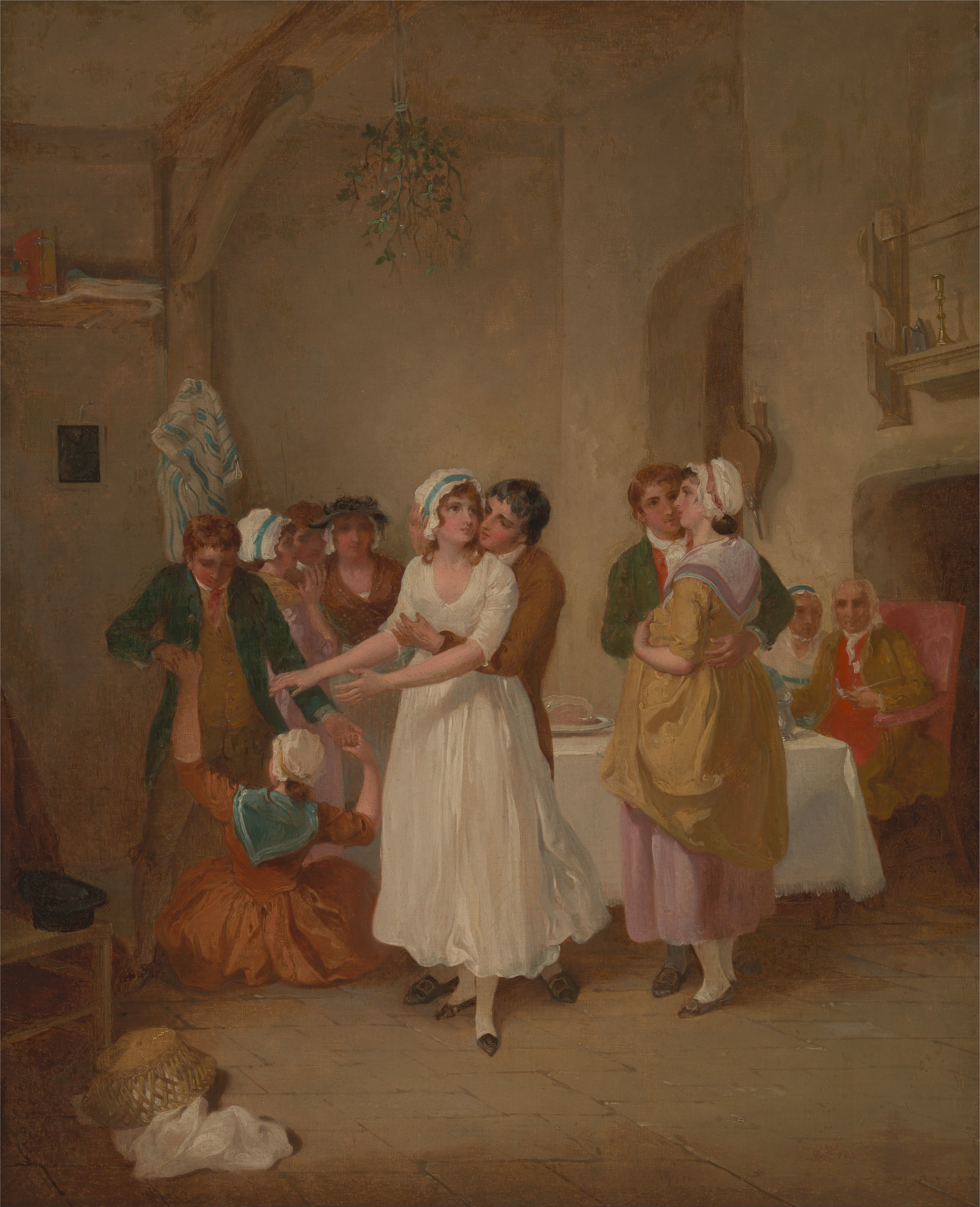
Kissing under the mistletoe as a surviving ritual

Sexual rituals fall into two categories: culture-created, and natural behaviour, the human animal having developed sex rituals from evolutionary instincts for reproduction, which are then integrated into society, and elaborated to include aspects such as marriage rites, dances, etc. Sometimes sexual rituals are highly formalized and/or part of religious activity, as in the cases of hieros gamos, the hierodule, and Ordo Templi Orientis (O.T.O.).

=== Political rituals ===
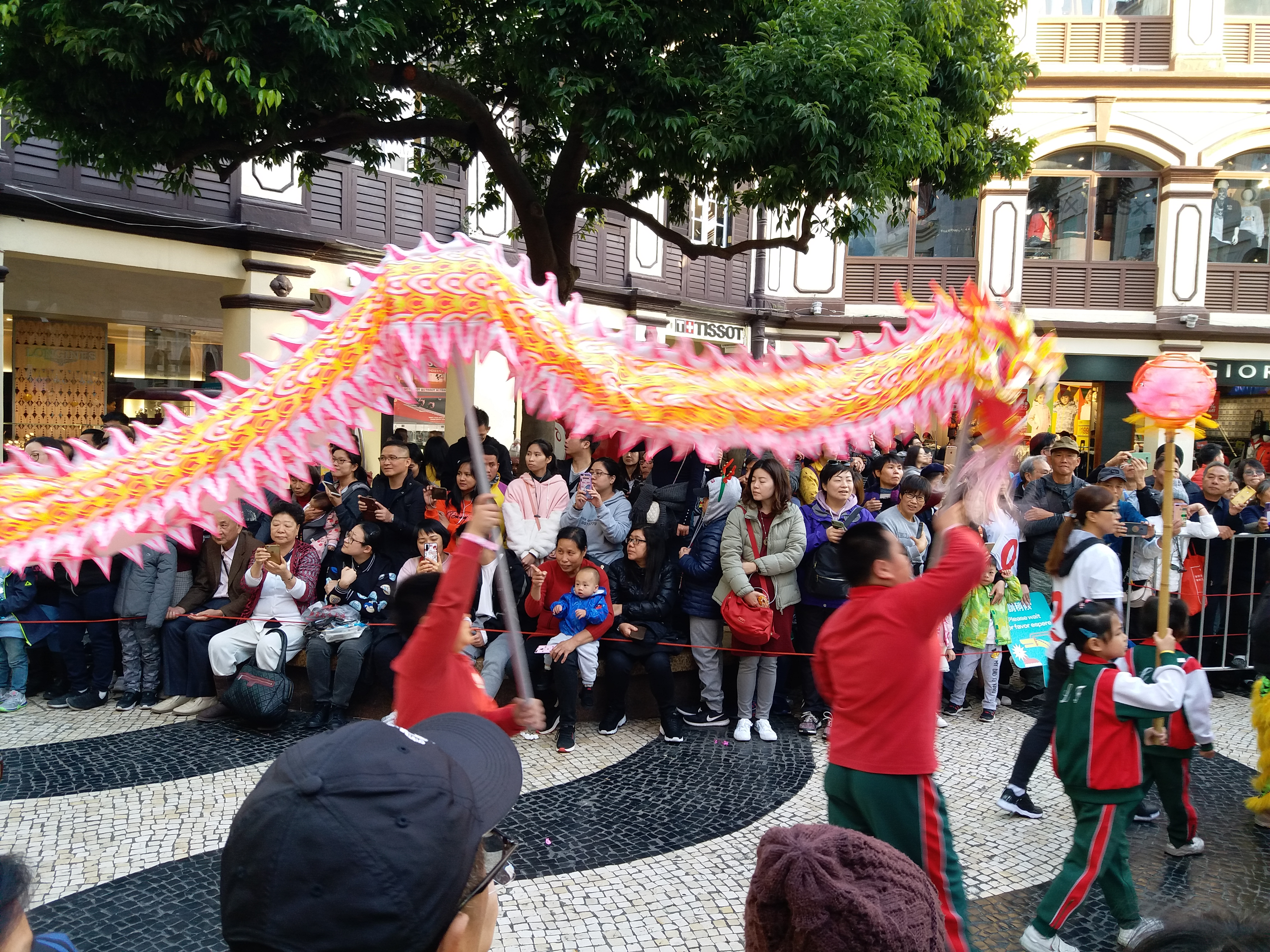
Parade through Macao, Latin City (2019). The Parade is held annually on December 20th to mark the anniversary of Macao's Handover to China.

According to anthropologist Clifford Geertz, political rituals actually construct power; that is, in his analysis of the Balinese state, he argued that rituals are not an ornament of political power, but that the power of political actors depends upon their ability to create rituals and the cosmic framework within which the social hierarchy headed by the king is perceived as natural and sacred. As a "dramaturgy of power" comprehensive ritual systems may create a cosmological order that sets a ruler apart as a divine being, as in "the divine right" of European kings, or the divine Japanese Emperor. Political rituals also emerge in the form of uncodified or codified conventions practiced by political officials that cement respect for the arrangements of an institution or role against the individual temporarily assuming it, as can be seen in the many rituals still observed within the procedure of parliamentary bodies.

Ritual can be used as a form of resistance, as for example, in the various Cargo Cults that developed against colonial powers in the South Pacific. In such religio-political movements, Islanders would use ritual imitations of western practices (such as the building of landing strips) as a means of summoning cargo (manufactured goods) from the ancestors. Leaders of these groups characterized the present state (often imposed by colonial capitalist regimes) as a dismantling of the old social order, which they sought to restore. Rituals may also attain political significance after conflict, as is the case with the Bosnian syncretic holidays and festivals that transgress religious boundaries.

=== Rituals Doing Gender ===
Cäcilia "Cillie" Rentmeister, a German scholar of art and culture, focused her research on Rituals and Ritualizations to the question, how in "western" and "traditional" societies Rites of Passage are "doing gender", shaping and confirming womenhood and masculinity. She describes, how in the lives of women an men, "Rites of Passage" accompany changes of status as well as all crises: pregnancy and birth, puberty and sexlife, marriage and divorce, dying and death, and also – with rites of initiation - all stages in education and profession. In this context, she also notes that "modern" cultures are by no means "ritually poor" in contrast to the "ritually rich" in "traditional" cultures.

For example, in her Essay Women's festivals as rites of passage. The Flying Lesbians make the liberated relationships dancing she describes the procedures and functions of the women's festivals held in many German cities in the 1970s - which were often attended by 1,000 to 2,000 women - as rites of passage introducing participants to the new, autonomous women's liberation movement. The sense of community was strengthened, new women ventured across the low threshold of a festival to make their first contacts with the women's movement, and new bonds were forged through dancing to the music of all-female bands, by film screenings, self-defense demonstrations, short lectures, and, of course, an abundant selection of food and drinks, and a steady increase in emotional involvement as the night goes on, with singing and dancing to anthems of the women's movement such as "Women Together are Strong".

== Anthropological theories ==
=== Functionalism ===
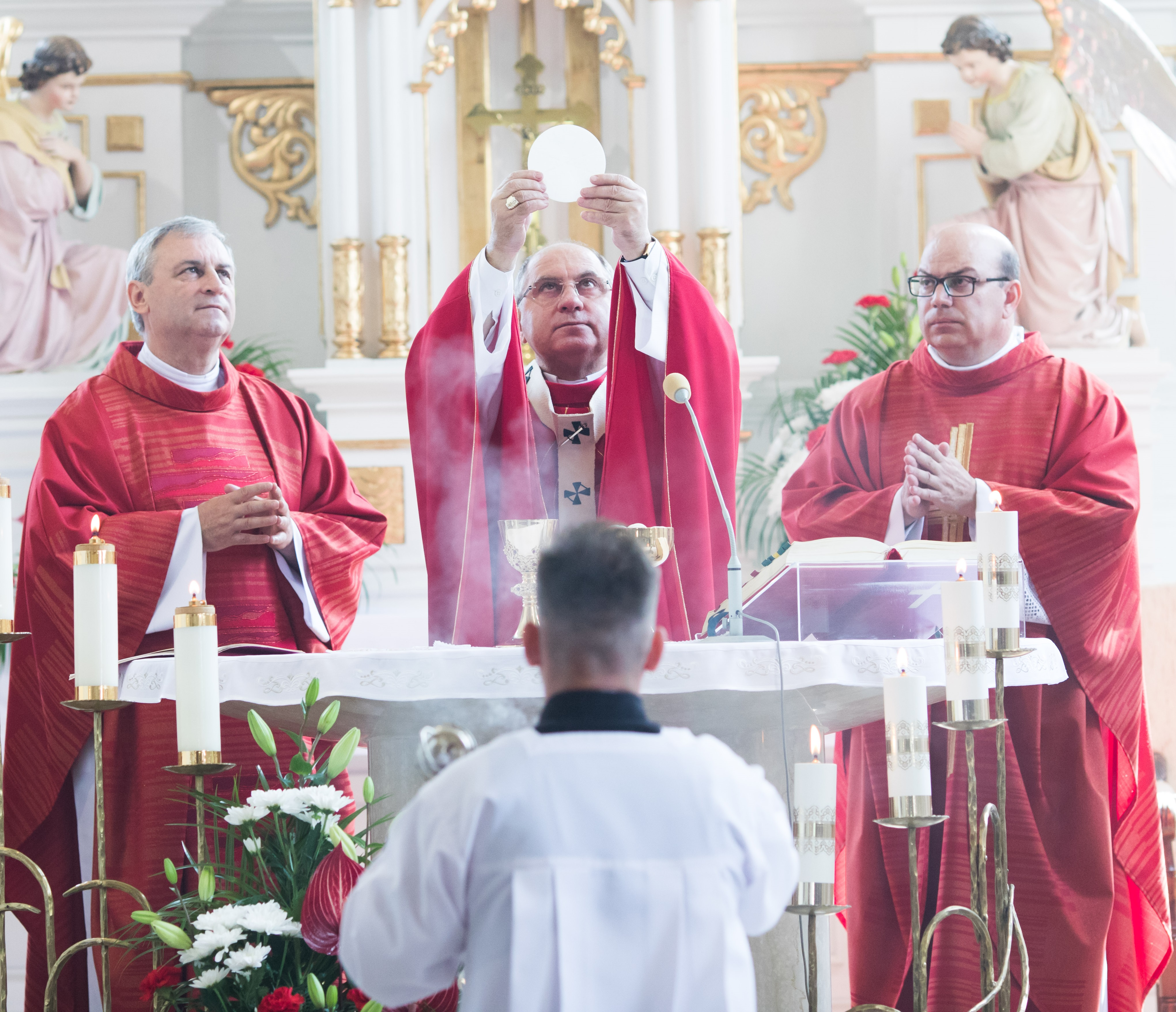
A priest elevates the host during a Catholic Mass, one of the most widely performed rituals in the world.

Nineteenth century "armchair anthropologists" were concerned with the basic question of how religion originated in human history. In the twentieth century their conjectural histories were replaced with new concerns around the question of what these beliefs and practices did for societies, regardless of their origin. In this view, religion was a universal, and while its content might vary enormously, it served certain basic functions such as the provision of prescribed solutions to basic human psychological and social problems, as well as expressing the central values of a society. Bronislaw Malinowski used the concept of function to address questions of individual psychological needs; A.R. Radcliffe-Brown, in contrast, looked for the function (purpose) of the institution or custom in preserving or maintaining society as a whole. They thus disagreed about the relationship of anxiety to ritual.

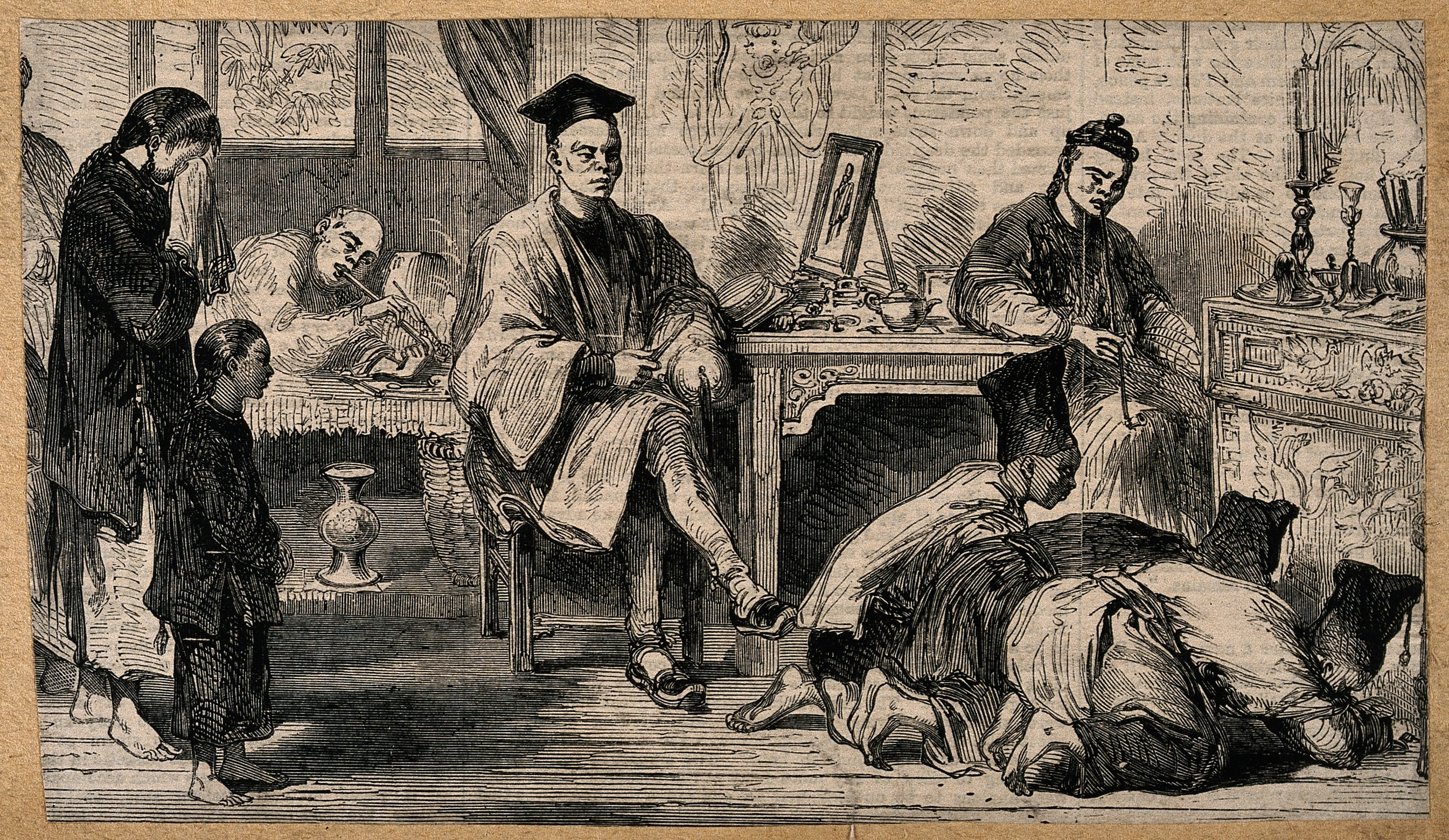
Kowtowing in a court, China, before 1889

Malinowski argued that ritual was a non-technical means of addressing anxiety about activities where dangerous elements were beyond technical control: "magic is to be expected and generally to be found whenever man comes to an unbridgeable gap, a hiatus in his knowledge or in his powers of practical control, and yet has to continue in his pursuit." Radcliffe-Brown in contrast, saw ritual as an expression of common interest symbolically representing a community, and that anxiety was felt only if the ritual was not performed. George C. Homans sought to resolve these opposing theories by differentiating between "primary anxieties" felt by people who lack the techniques to secure results, and "secondary (or displaced) anxiety" felt by those who have not performed the rites meant to allay primary anxiety correctly. Homans argued that purification rituals may then be conducted to dispel secondary anxiety.

A.R. Radcliffe-Brown argued that ritual should be distinguished from technical action, viewing it as a structured event: "ritual acts differ from technical acts in having in all instances some expressive or symbolic element in them." Edmund Leach, in contrast, saw ritual and technical action less as separate structural types of activity and more as a spectrum: "Actions fall into place on a continuous scale. At one extreme we have actions which are entirely profane, entirely functional, technique pure and simple; at the other we have actions which are entirely sacred, strictly aesthetic, technically non-functional. Between these two extremes we have the great majority of social actions which partake partly of the one sphere and partly of the other. From this point of view technique and ritual, profane and sacred, do not denote types of action but aspects of almost any kind of action."

==== As social control ====
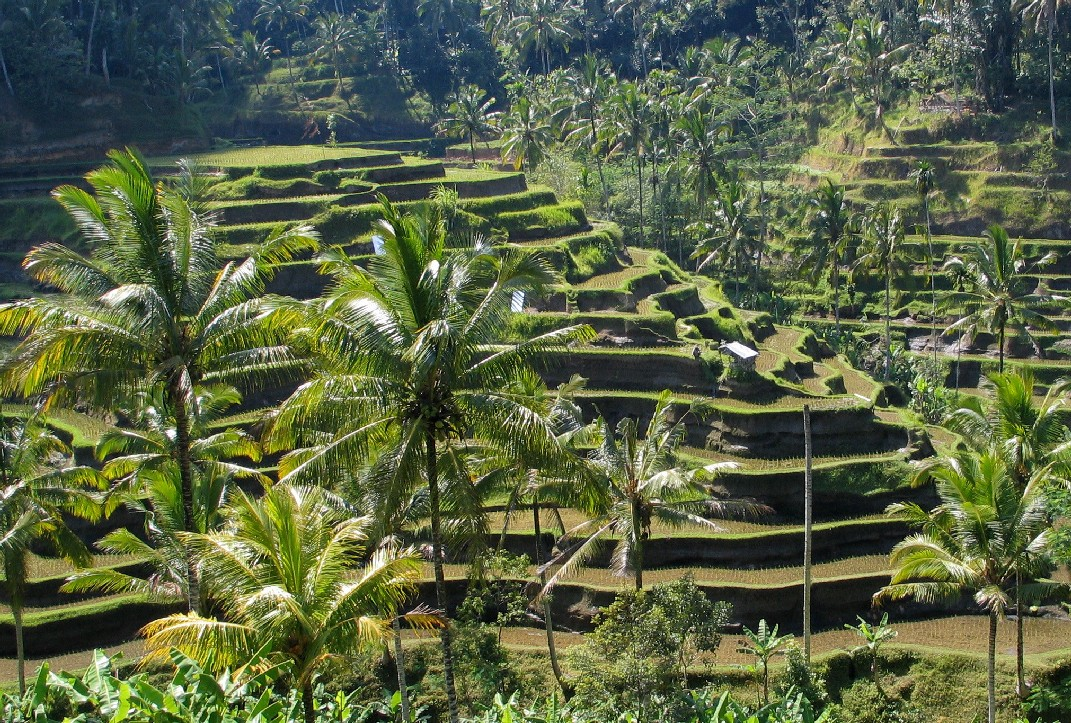
Balinese rice terraces regulated through ritual

The functionalist model viewed ritual as a homeostatic mechanism to regulate and stabilize social institutions by adjusting social interactions, maintaining a group ethos, and restoring harmony after disputes.

Although the functionalist model was soon superseded, later "neofunctional" theorists adopted its approach by examining the ways that ritual regulated larger ecological systems. Roy Rappaport, for example, examined the way gift exchanges of pigs between tribal groups in Papua New Guinea maintained environmental balance between humans, available food (with pigs sharing the same foodstuffs as humans) and resource base. Rappaport concluded that ritual, "...helps to maintain an undegraded environment, limits fighting to frequencies which do not endanger the existence of regional population, adjusts man-land ratios, facilitates trade, distributes local surpluses of pig throughout the regional population in the form of pork, and assures people of high quality protein when they are most in need of it". Similarly, J. Stephen Lansing traced how the intricate calendar of Hindu Balinese rituals served to regulate the vast irrigation systems of Bali, ensuring the optimum distribution of water over the system while limiting disputes.

==== Rebellion ====
While most Functionalists sought to link ritual to the maintenance of social order, South African functionalist anthropologist Max Gluckman coined the phrase "rituals of rebellion" to describe a type of ritual in which the accepted social order was symbolically turned on its head. Gluckman argued that the ritual was an expression of underlying social tensions (an idea taken up by Victor Turner), and that it functioned as an institutional pressure valve, relieving those tensions through these cyclical performances. The rites ultimately functioned to reinforce social order, insofar as they allowed those tensions to be expressed without leading to actual rebellion. Carnival is viewed in the same light. He observed, for example, how the first-fruits festival (incwala) of the South African Bantu kingdom of Swaziland symbolically inverted the normal social order, so that the king was publicly insulted, women asserted their domination over men, and the established authority of elders over the young was turned upside down.

=== Structuralism ===
Claude Lévi-Strauss, the French anthropologist, regarded all social and cultural organization as symbolic systems of communication shaped by the inherent structure of the human brain. He therefore argued that the symbol systems are not reflections of social structure as the Functionalists believed, but are imposed on social relations to organize them. Lévi-Strauss thus viewed myth and ritual as complementary symbol systems, one verbal, one non-verbal. Lévi-Strauss was not concerned to develop a theory of ritual (although he did produce a four-volume analysis of myth) but was influential to later scholars of ritual such as Mary Douglas and Edmund Leach.

=== Structure and anti-structure ===
Victor Turner combined Arnold van Gennep's model of the structure of initiation rites, and Gluckman's functionalist emphasis on the ritualization of social conflict to maintain social equilibrium, with a more structural model of symbols in ritual. Running counter to this emphasis on structured symbolic oppositions within a ritual was his exploration of the liminal phase of rites of passage, a phase in which "anti-structure" appears. In this phase, opposed states such as birth and death may be encompassed by a single act, object or phrase. The dynamic nature of symbols experienced in ritual provides a compelling personal experience; ritual is a "mechanism that periodically converts the obligatory into the desirable".

Mary Douglas, a British Functionalist, extended Turner's theory of ritual structure and anti-structure with her own contrasting set of terms "grid" and "group" in the book Natural Symbols. Drawing on Levi-Strauss' Structuralist approach, she saw ritual as symbolic communication that constrained social behaviour. Grid is a scale referring to the degree to which a symbolic system is a shared frame of reference. Group refers to the degree people are tied into a tightly knit community. When graphed on two intersecting axes, four quadrants are possible: strong group/strong grid, strong group/weak grid, weak group/weak grid, weak group/strong grid. Douglas argued that societies with strong group or strong grid were marked by more ritual activity than those weak in either group or grid. (see also, section below)

==== Anti-structure and communitas ====
In his analysis of rites of passage, Victor Turner argued that the liminal phase – that period 'betwixt and between' – was marked by "two models of human interrelatedness, juxtaposed and alternating": structure and anti-structure (or communitas). While the ritual clearly articulated the cultural ideals of a society through ritual symbolism, the unrestrained festivities of the liminal period served to break down social barriers and to join the group into an undifferentiated unity with "no status, property, insignia, secular clothing, rank, kinship position, nothing to demarcate themselves from their fellows". These periods of symbolic inversion have been studied in a diverse range of rituals such as pilgrimages and Yom Kippur.

==== Social dramas ====
Beginning with Max Gluckman's concept of "rituals of rebellion", Victor Turner argued that many types of ritual also served as "social dramas" through which structural social tensions could be expressed, and temporarily resolved. Drawing on Van Gennep's model of initiation rites, Turner viewed these social dramas as a dynamic process through which the community renewed itself through the ritual creation of communitas during the "liminal phase". Turner analyzed the ritual events in 4 stages: breach in relations, crisis, redressive actions, and acts of reintegration. Like Gluckman, he argued these rituals maintain social order while facilitating disordered inversions, thereby moving people to a new status, just as in an initiation rite.

=== Symbolic approaches to ritual ===
Arguments, melodies, formulas, maps and pictures are not idealities to be stared at but texts to be read; so are rituals, palaces, technologies, and social formations.

— Geertz (1980), p. 135

Clifford Geertz also expanded on the symbolic approach to ritual that began with Victor Turner. Geertz argued that religious symbol systems provided both a "model of" reality (showing how to interpret the world as is) as well as a "model for" reality (clarifying its ideal state). The role of ritual, according to Geertz, is to bring these two aspects – the "model of" and the "model for" – together: "it is in ritual – that is consecrated behaviour – that this conviction that religious conceptions are veridical and that religious directives are sound is somehow generated."

Symbolic anthropologists like Geertz analyzed rituals as language-like codes to be interpreted independently as cultural systems. Geertz rejected Functionalist arguments that ritual describes social order, arguing instead that ritual actively shapes that social order and imposes meaning on disordered experience. He also differed from Gluckman and Turner's emphasis on ritual action as a means of resolving social passion, arguing instead that it simply displayed them.

=== As a form of communication ===
Whereas Victor Turner saw in ritual the potential to release people from the binding structures of their lives into a liberating anti-structure or communitas, Maurice Bloch argued that ritual produced conformity.

Maurice Bloch argued that ritual communication is unusual in that it uses a special, restricted vocabulary, a small number of permissible illustrations, and a restrictive grammar. As a result, ritual utterances become very predictable, and the speaker is made anonymous in that they have little choice in what to say. The restrictive syntax reduces the ability of the speaker to make propositional arguments, and they are left, instead, with utterances that cannot be contradicted such as "I do thee wed" in a wedding. These kinds of utterances, known as performatives, prevent speakers from making political arguments through logical argument, and are typical of what Weber called traditional authority instead.

Bloch's model of ritual language denies the possibility of creativity. Thomas Csordas, in contrast, analyzes how ritual language can be used to innovate. Csordas looks at groups of rituals that share performative elements ("genres" of ritual with a shared "poetics"). These rituals may fall along the spectrum of formality, with some less, others more formal and restrictive. Csordas argues that innovations may be introduced in less formalized rituals. As these innovations become more accepted and standardized, they are slowly adopted in more formal rituals. In this way, even the most formal of rituals are potential avenues for creative expression.

=== As a disciplinary program ===
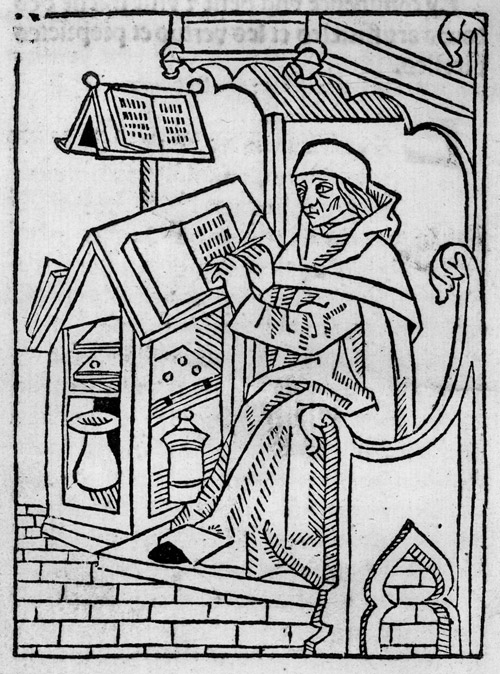
Scriptorium monk at work. "Monks described this labor of transcribing manuscripts as being 'like prayer and fasting, a means of correcting one's unruly passions.'"

In his historical analysis of articles on ritual and rite in the Encyclopaedia Britannica, Talal Asad notes that from 1771 to 1852, the brief articles on ritual define it as a "book directing the order and manner to be observed in performing divine service" (i.e., as a script). There are no articles on the subject thereafter until 1910, when a new, lengthy article appeared that redefines ritual as "...a type of routine behaviour that symbolizes or expresses something". As a symbolic activity, it is no longer confined to religion, but is distinguished from technical action. The shift in definitions from script to behavior, which is likened to a text, is matched by a semantic distinction between ritual as an outward sign (i.e., public symbol) and inward meaning.

The emphasis has changed to establishing the meaning of public symbols and abandoning concerns with inner emotional states since, as Evans-Pritchard wrote "such emotional states, if present at all, must vary not only from individual to individual, but also in the same individual on different occasions and even at different points in the same rite." Asad, in contrast, emphasizes behavior and inner emotional states; rituals are to be performed, and mastering these performances is a skill requiring disciplined action.

In other words, apt performance involves not symbols to be interpreted but abilities to be acquired according to rules that are sanctioned by those in authority: it presupposes no obscure meanings, but rather the formation of physical and linguistic skills.

— Asad (1993), p. 62

Drawing on the example of Medieval monastic life in Europe, he points out that ritual in this case refers to its original meaning of the "...book directing the order and manner to be observed in performing divine service". This book "prescribed practices, whether they had to do with the proper ways of eating, sleeping, working, and praying or with proper moral dispositions and spiritual aptitudes, aimed at developing virtues that are put 'to the service of God.'" Monks, in other words, were disciplined in the Foucauldian sense. The point of monastic discipline was to learn skills and appropriate emotions. Asad contrasts his approach by concluding:

Symbols call for interpretation, and even as interpretive criteria are extended so interpretations can be multiplied. Disciplinary practices, on the other hand, cannot be varied so easily, because learning to develop moral capabilities is not the same thing as learning to invent representations.

— Asad (1993), p. 79

=== As a form of social solidarity ===
Ethnographic observation shows ritual can create social solidarity. Douglas Foley Went to North Town, Texas, between 1973 and 1974 to study public high school culture. He used interviews, participant observation, and unstructured chatting to study racial tension and capitalist culture in his ethnography Learning Capitalist Culture. Foley refers to football games and Friday Night Lights as a community ritual. This ritual united the school and created a sense of solidarity and community on a weekly basis involving pep rallies and the game itself. Foley observed judgement and segregation based on class, social status, wealth, and gender. He described Friday Night Lights as a ritual that overcomes those differences: "The other, gentler, more social side of football was, of course, the emphasis on camaraderie, loyalty, friendship between players, and pulling together". In his ethnography Waiting for Elijah: Time and Encounter in a Bosnian Landscape, anthropologist Safet Hadži Muhamedović suggests that shared festivals like St George's Day and St Elijah's Day structure interfaith relationships and appear as acts of solidarity against ethno-nationalist purifications of territory in Bosnia.

=== Ritualization ===
Asad's work critiqued the notion that there were universal characteristics of ritual to be found in all cases. Catherine Bell has extended this idea by shifting attention from ritual as a category, to the processes of "ritualization" by which ritual is created as a cultural form in a society. Ritualization is "a way of acting that is designed and orchestrated to distinguish and privilege what is being done in comparison to other, usually more quotidian, activities".

=== Sociobiology and behavioral neuroscience ===
Anthropologists have also analyzed ritual via insights from other behavioral sciences. The idea that cultural rituals share behavioral similarities with personal rituals of individuals was discussed early on by Freud. Dulaney and Fiske compared ethnographic descriptions of both rituals and non-ritual doings, such as work to behavioral descriptions from clinical descriptions of obsessive–compulsive disorder (OCD). They note that OCD behavior often consists of such behavior as constantly cleaning objects, concern or disgust with bodily waste or secretions, repetitive actions to prevent harm, heavy emphasis on number or order of actions etc. They then show that ethnographic descriptions of cultural rituals contain around 5 times more of such content than ethnographic descriptions of other activities such as "work". Fiske later repeated similar analysis with more descriptions from a larger collection of different cultures, also contrasting descriptions of cultural rituals to descriptions of other behavioral disorders (in addition to OCD), in order to show that only OCD-like behavior (not other illnesses) shares properties with rituals. The authors offer tentative explanations for these findings, for example that these behavioral traits are widely needed for survival, to control risk, and cultural rituals are often performed in the context of perceived collective risk.

Other anthropologists have taken these insights further, and constructed more elaborate theories based on the brain functions and physiology. Liénard and Boyer suggest that commonalities between obsessive behavior in individuals and similar behavior in collective contexts possibly share similarities due to underlying mental processes they call hazard precaution. They suggest that individuals of societies seem to pay more attention to information relevant to avoiding hazards, which in turn can explain why collective rituals displaying actions of hazard precaution are so popular and prevail for long periods in cultural transmission.

=== Ritual as a methodological measure of religiosity ===
According to the sociologist Mervin Verbit, ritual may be understood as one of the key components of religiosity. And ritual itself may be broken down into four dimensions; content, frequency, intensity and centrality. The content of a ritual may vary from ritual to ritual, as does the frequency of its practice, the intensity of the ritual (how much of an impact it has on the practitioner), and the centrality of the ritual (in that religious tradition).

In this sense, ritual is similar to Charles Glock's "practice" dimension of religiosity.

== Religious perspectives ==
In religion, a ritual can comprise the prescribed outward forms of performing the cultus, or cult, of a particular observation within a religion or religious denomination. Although ritual is often used in context with worship performed in a church, the actual relationship between any religion's doctrine and its ritual(s) can vary considerably from organized religion to non-institutionalized spirituality, such as ayahuasca shamanism as practiced by the Urarina of the upper Amazon. Rituals often have a close connection with reverence, thus a ritual in many cases expresses reverence for a deity or idealized state of humanity.

=== Ancient Mesopotamia ===
The Sumerians used the term Me (mythology) to refer to rituals, a word that was later equated with parṣu in the Akkadian language by the Babylonians and Assyrians. In Mesopotamia, these rituals were considered to be the property of the gods, and only certain individuals, such as kings and religious experts, had knowledge of them. From an ancient perspective, the gods themselves could also perform rituals, or acquire them from other gods to increase their power. This is a reflection of historical power struggles on a theological and political level.

=== Christianity ===
This Lutheran pastor administers the rite of confirmation on youth confirmands after instructing them in Luther's Small Catechism.

In Christianity, a rite is used to refer to a sacred ceremony (such as anointing of the sick), which may or may not carry the status of a sacrament depending on the Christian denomination (in Roman Catholicism, anointing of the sick is a sacrament while in Lutheranism it is not). The word "rite" is also used to denote a liturgical tradition usually emanating from a specific center; examples include the Roman Rite, the Byzantine Rite, and the Sarum Rite. Such rites may include various sub-rites. For example, the Byzantine Rite (which is used by the Eastern Orthodox, Eastern Lutheran, and Eastern Catholic churches) has Greek, Russian, and other ethnically based variants.

=== Islam ===
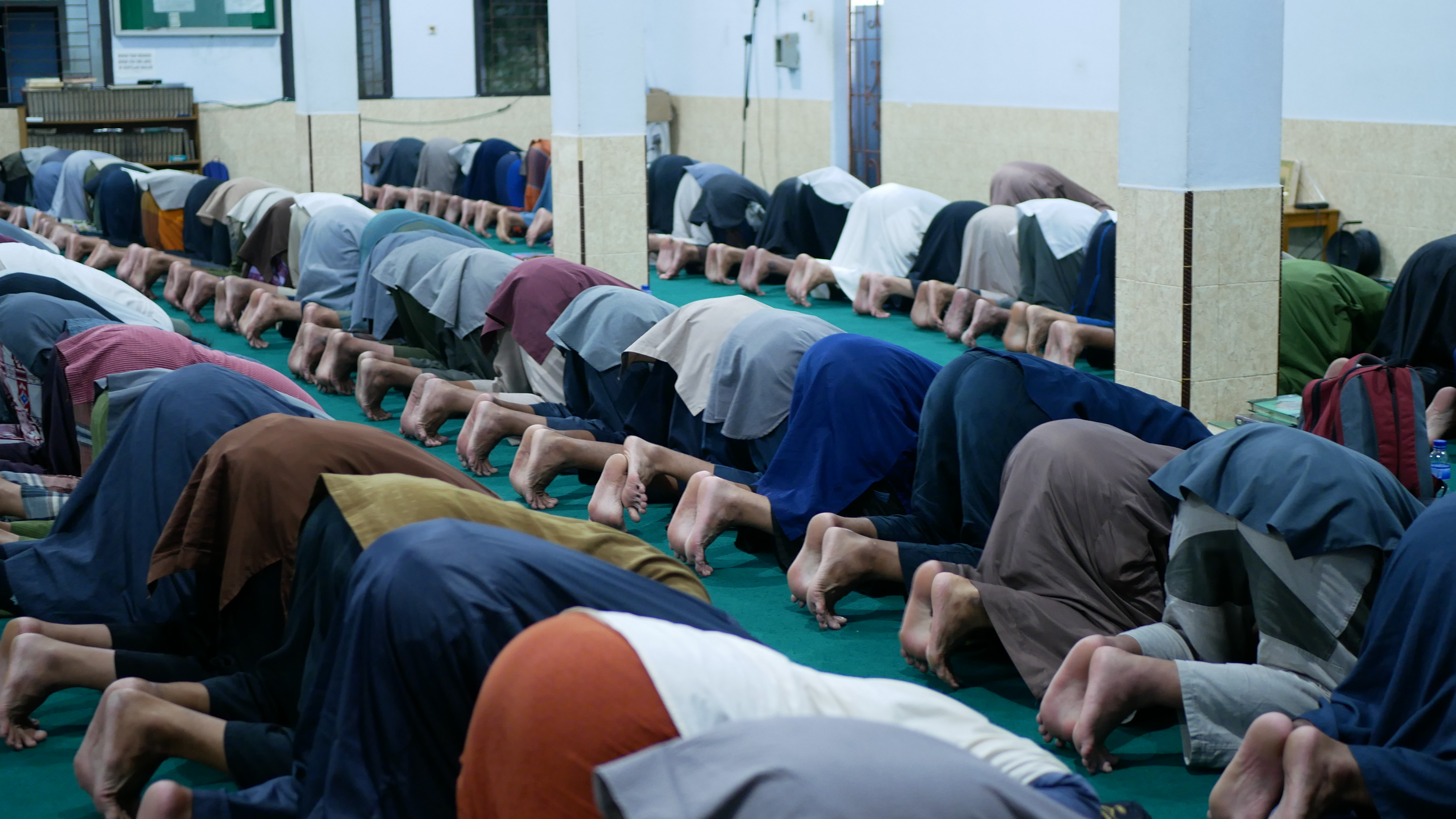
In Islam, Sujud (prostrations) occupy a quintessential position in the five obligatory daily formal prayers.

For daily prayers, practicing Muslims must perform a ritual recitation from the Quran in Arabic while bowing and prostrating. Quranic chapter 2 prescribes rituals such as the direction to face for prayers (qiblah); pilgrimage (Hajj), and fasting in Ramadan. Iḥrām is a state of ritual purity in preparation for pilgrimage in Islam.

Hajj rituals include circumambulation around the Kaʿbah.... and show us our rites – these rites (manāsik) are presumed the rituals of ḥajj. Truly Ṣafā and Marwah are among the rituals of God Saʿy is the ritual travel, partway between walking and running, seven times between the two hills.

== Freemasonry ==
In Freemasonry, rituals are scripted words and actions which employ Masonic symbolism to illustrate the principles espoused by Freemasons. These rituals are progressively taught to entrusted members during initiation into a particular Masonic rite comprising a series of degrees conferred by a Masonic body. The degrees of Freemasonry derive from the three grades of medieval craft guilds; those of "Entered Apprentice", "Journeyman" (or "Fellowcraft"), and "Master Mason". In North America, Freemasons who have been raised to the degree of "Master Mason" have the option of joining appendant bodies that offer additional degrees to those, such as those of the Scottish Rite or the York Rite.

== See also ==
- Behavioral script – Expected behaviors
- Builders' rites – Ceremonies associated with construction
- Chinese ritual mastery traditions – Chinese folk religious order
- Confucianism § Rite and centring – Chinese ethical and philosophical system
- Gut (ritual) – Korean shamanic rite
- Kagura – Type of ceremonial dance in Shinto ritual
- List of substances used in rituals
- Nabichum
- Nuo rituals – Indigenous Chinese religion
- Process art – Art movement
- Processional walkway – Structure
- Religious symbolism – Icon representing a particular religion
- Ritualism in the Church of England – Emphasis on the rituals and liturgical ceremony of the church
- Symbolic boundaries – Theory of social grouping
- Taiping Qingjiao – Taoist festival
- The Rite of Spring – 1913 ballet by Igor Stravinsky

== Bibliography ==
- Asad, Talal (1993). "Toward a genealogy of the concept of ritual". Genealogies of Religion. Baltimore: Johns Hopkins University Press.
- Bell, Catherine (1997). Ritual: Perspectives and Dimensions. New York: Oxford University Press.
- Geertz, Clifford (1980). Negara: the Theatre State in Nineteenth-Century Bali. Princeton: Princeton University Press.
- Lessa, William A.; Vogt, Evon Z., eds. (1979). Reader in Comparative Religion: An Anthropological Approach. New York: Harper & Row. ISBN 9780060439910.
- Tolbert, Elizabeth (1990a). "Women Cry with Words: Symbolization of Affect in the Karelian Lament". Yearbook for Traditional Music. 22: 80–105. doi:10.2307/767933. JSTOR 767933. S2CID 192949893.
- Tolbert, Elizabeth (1990b). "Magico-Religious Power and Gender in the Karelian Lament". In Herndon, M.; Zigler, S. (eds.). Music, Gender, and Culture, vol. 1. Intercultural Music Studies. Wilhelmshaven, DE.: International Council for Traditional Music, Florian Noetzel Verlag. pp. 41–56.
- Turner, Victor W. (1967). The Forest of Symbols: Aspects of Ndembu Ritual. Ithaca, NY: Cornell University Press.
- Turner, Victor W. (1969). The Ritual Process: Structure and Anti-Structure. Ithaca, NY: Cornell University Press.
- Wilce, James M. (2006). "Magical Laments and Anthropological Reflections: The Production and Circulation of Anthropological Text as Ritual Activity". Current Anthropology. 47 (6): 891–914. doi:10.1086/507195. S2CID 11691889.
