= The Headless Republic =

2005 book by Jesse Goldhammer

The Headless Republic: Sacrificial Violence in Modern French Thought
- Author: Jesse Goldhammer
- Language: English
- Publisher: Cornell University Press
- Publication date: May 15, 2005
- Publication place: United States
- Media type: Print
- Pages: 218
- ISBN: 978-0-8014-4150-9

The Headless Republic: Sacrificial Violence in Modern French Thought is a book by the political scientist Jesse Goldhammer that explores the purportedly sacrificial significance given to revolutionary violence during the French Revolution. The work argues that revolutionaries who overthrew the Ancien Régime believed that sacrifice, defined as "a public spectacle of ritual violence", was necessary for the foundation of a new regime. Goldhammer shows how the insurgents "consistently referred to their acts of violence in sacrificial terms and used sacrificial themes to imagine different relationships between bloodshed and political beginnings."

The categorization of the violence during the French Revolution as "sacrificial" was not made by the revolutionaries themselves: instead, this was done by intellectuals responding to it (in particular the execution of Louis XVI). The three writers whose views Goldhammer examines are Joseph de Maistre, Georges Sorel, and Georges Bataille.

The specific episodes of violence that Goldhammer regards as sacrificial are the regicide, the insurrectionary events of August 10, 1792, the September Massacres in the same year, the Terror, and the execution of Robespierre. Goldhammer argues that the revolutionaries made reference to ancient Roman and Christian traditions of sacrifice in order to guide their "sacrilegious plan to end the French monarchy."

The logic of sacrifice is conceptualized in Goldhammer's book as the slaying of a scapegoat in order to prevent further, "potentially limitless" violence. The sacrificial act establishes the boundaries between the sacred and the profane.

== Reception ==
The political scientist James Martel described The Headless Republic as "a thorough and engaging explication of the logic of sacrifice in French political thought." William Safran described the book as an "unusual and provocative study in intellectual history. ... The author is aware that a mix of policies and rationales can be subsumed under the rubric of sacrifice and that, as in the case of the al Qaeda suicide bombings, the distinction between self-sacrifice or martyrdom and the killing of others as a political strategy can become confused and perverted."

== See also ==
- Political theology
- Political violence
