= CVT =

CVT may refer to:

== Science and technology ==
- Capacitor voltage transformer, an electrical transformer commonly used in high-voltage transmission line applications
- Centroidal Voronoi tessellation, a geometric object
- Chemical vapor transport, a method for growing crystals
- Constant voltage transformer, a type of saturating transformer as an alternating current voltage stabilizer
- Coordinated Video Timings, specified by VESA
- Cytoplasm-to-vacuole targeting, an autophagy-related pathway in yeast
- Compound Value Type, a type within Freebase which is used to represent data where each entry consists of multiple fields
- Cardiovascular thoracic surgery (see cardiothoracic surgery), a field of medicine involved in surgical treatment of diseases affecting organs inside the thorax (the chest)—generally treatment of conditions of the heart (heart disease) and lungs (lung disease)
- Cerebral venous thrombosis or cerebral venous sinus thrombosis.
- Drill chucks

== Organizations ==
- Center for Victims of Torture, a non-profit organisation that provides counseling and social services to victims of politically motivated torture
- Centro di Volo a Vela del Politecnico di Torino, the gliding section of the Turin Polytechnic; see List of gliders
- Creative Vision Technologies, see Northgate Computers

== Transportation and military ==
- Continuously variable transmission, a vehicle transmission providing an infinite number of possible gear ratios
- Coventry Airport (IATA airport code), United Kingdom
- Peran (ICAO airline designator), Kazakhstan; see Airline codes-P
- Aircraft Carrier, Training (former hull classification symbol), a training aircraft carrier in the United States Navy

== Other uses ==
- Cape Verde Time, a time zone used in Cape Verde
- Certified Veterinary Technician
- Cognitive valence theory, a theoretical framework that describes and explains the process of intimacy exchange within a dyad relationship
- Complete Vocal Technique, a singing method developed by Cathrine Sadolin
- Corneliu Vadim Tudor (1949 – 2015), Romanian politician
