= Child sexual abuse prevention programmes =

Child sexual abuse prevention programs are programs designed to lower the incidence of sexual abuse amongst those that access them. Programs can be provided to children and young people, those employed in childcare, people who would have otherwise have abused a young person, and situations where abuse can take place.

== Child sexual abuse prevention programs provided to children ==
Child sexual abuse prevention programs provided to children are said to be the most common type of primary prevention of child sexual abuse.

Child-focused, school-based sexual abuse prevention programs were first developed in the United States in the 1970s in response to growing concerns about the prevalence and effects of child sexual abuse. Studies had shown that offenders targeted children perceived as being more compliant and less likely to disclose any molestation. Such programs are now popular in America; one study suggests more children have been involved in such programs than not.

Child-focused, school-based sexual abuse prevention programs aim to increase the knowledge and skills of children and to increase their confidence that they can do things to prevent abuse. Types of knowledge that programs try to improve include being able to identify abusers, potentially abusive situations, and boundary violations. Children are instructed in how to refuse approaches and invitations, break off interactions, and report abuse. It has been argued that the programs "empower" children to act against attempts at abuse by teaching that CSA is wrong and not the victim's fault, and by reinforcing children's right to say who can touch them and where. It is suggested this strategy strengthens their sense of control in a sexual conflict, confirms children's preference for harmless refusal strategies, and demonstrates that disclosing abuse can lead to getting help for both the victim and the offender. Some programs offer a safe and private context for children to talk to the teacher or trainer about incidents of abuse.
