= Profane (religion) =

Lack of respect for things that are held to be sacred

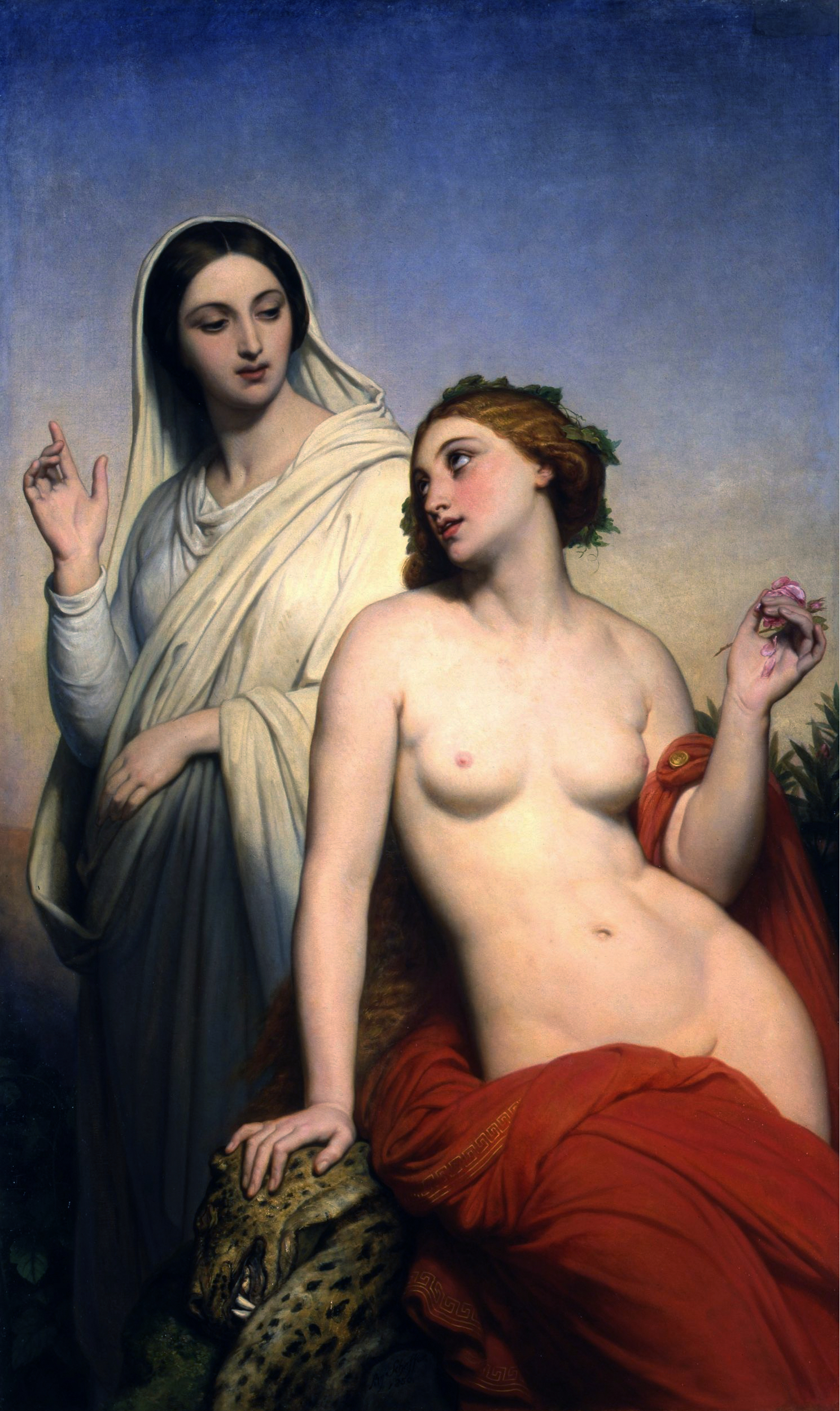
Dutch: De hemelse en aardse liefde Heavenly and Earthly Love

Profane, or profanity in religious use may refer to a lack of respect for things that are held to be sacred, which implies anything inspiring or deserving of reverence, as well as behaviour showing similar disrespect or causing religious offense. The word is also used in a neutral sense for things or people not related to the sacred; for example profane history, profane literature, etc. In this sense it is contrasted with "sacred", with meaning similar to "secular".

The distinction between the sacred and the profane was considered by Émile Durkheim to be central to the social reality of human religion.

== Etymology ==
The term profane originates from classical Latin profanus, literally "before (outside) the temple", "pro" being outside and "fanum" being temple or sanctuary. It carried the meaning of either "desecrating what is holy" or "with a secular purpose" as early as the 1450s. Profanity represented secular indifference to religion or religious figures, while blasphemy was a more offensive attack on religion and religious figures, considered sinful, and a direct violation of The Ten Commandments. Moreover, many Bible verses speak against swearing. In some countries, profanity words often have pagan roots that after Christian influence were turned from names of deities and spirits to profanity and used as such, like the famous Finnish profanity word perkele, which was believed to be an original name of the thunder god Ukko, the chief god of the Finnish pagan pantheon.

Profanities, in the original meaning of blasphemous profanity, are part of the ancient tradition of the comic cults which laughed and scoffed at the deity or deities: an example of this would be Lucian's Dialogues of the Gods satire.

== Sacred–profane dichotomy ==
The sacred–profane dichotomy is a concept posited by the French sociologist Émile Durkheim in 1912, who considered it to be the central characteristic of religion: "religion is a unified system of beliefs and practices relative to sacred things, that is to say, things set apart and forbidden." In Durkheim's theory, the sacred represents the interests of the group, especially unity, which were embodied in sacred group symbols, or totems. The profane, however, involves mundane individual concerns. Durkheim explicitly stated that the sacred–profane dichotomy is not equivalent to good–evil, as the sacred could be either good or evil, and the profane could be either as well.

The profane world consists of all that people can know through their senses; it is the natural world of everyday life that people experience as either comprehensible or at least ultimately knowable — the Lebenswelt or lifeworld.

In contrast, the sacred, or sacrum in Latin, encompasses all that exists beyond the everyday, natural world that people experience with their senses. As such, the sacred or numinous can inspire feelings of awe, because it is regarded as ultimately unknowable and beyond limited human abilities to perceive and comprehend. Durkheim pointed out however that there are degrees of sacredness, so that an amulet for example may be sacred yet little respected.

== Transitions ==
Rites of passage represent movements from one state—the profane—to the other, the sacred; or back again to the profane.

Religion is organized primarily around the sacred elements of human life and provides a collective attempt to bridge the gap between the sacred and the profane.

== Profane progress ==
Modernization and the Enlightenment project have led to a secularisation of culture over the past few centuries – an extension of the profanum at the (often explicit) expense of the sacred. The predominant 21st-century global worldview is as a result empirical, sensate, contractual, this-worldly – in short, profane.

Carl Jung expressed the same thought more subjectively when he wrote that "I know – and here I am expressing what countless other people know – that the present time is the time of God's disappearance and death".

== Counter reaction ==
The advance of the profane has led to several countermovements, attempting to limit the scope of the profanum. Modernism set out to bring myth and a sense of the sacred back into secular reality — Wallace Stevens was speaking for much of the movement when he wrote that "if nothing was divine then all things were, the world itself".

Fundamentalism – Christian, Muslim, or other – set its face against the profanum with a return to sacred writ.

Psychology too has set out to protect the boundaries of the individual self from profane intrusion, establishing ritual places for inward work in opposition to the postmodern loss of privacy.

== Cultural examples ==
Seamus Heaney considered that "the desacralizing of space is something that my generation experienced in all kinds of ways".

== See also ==
- Carnival and carnivalesque
- Deconsecrate
- Desecrate
- Grotesque body
- Kegare
- Sacred site
- Sacrilege
- Secular religion
- Secular state
- Symbolic boundaries
- Wickedness
