= Catherine Bell (religious studies scholar) =

American religious studies scholar

- Born: 1953; New York City, United States
- Died: May 23, 2008 (aged 54–55)
- Education: Manhattanville College (BA); University of Chicago Divinity School (MA, PhD)
- Occupation: Religious studies scholar
- Employers: Seishin Joshi Gakuin (1982–83); International University of Japan (1983); Santa Clara University (1985–2005)
- Spouse: Steven Gelber

Catherine Bell (1953 – May 23, 2008) was an American religious studies scholar who specialised in the study of Chinese religions and ritual studies. From 1985 until her death she worked at Santa Clara University's religious studies department, of which she was chair from 2000 to 2005.

Born in New York City, she studied at Manhattanville College and University of Chicago Divinity School before briefly teaching in Japan at the Seishin Joshi Gakuin and International University of Japan. Returning to the United States, she began work at Santa Clara in 1985, devoting her research to Chinese ritual, resulting in her most prominent publication, Ritual Theory, Ritual Practice (1992). In 1998 she became the Bernard Hanley Professor of Religious Studies, before becoming chair of the religious studies department in 2000. Retiring due to persistent health problems in 2005, she continued to research until her death.

== Biography ==
Born in New York City, Bell undertook her undergraduate studies at Manhattanville College, gaining a double-major BA in philosophy and religion in 1975. She proceeded to complete her MA in the History of Religion at the University of Chicago's Divinity School in 1976, continuing with a PhD there, completed in 1983. Moving to Japan, she taught at the Seishin Joshi Gakuin in Tokyo from 1982 to 1983, before moving to the International University of Japan in Niigata in 1983. She then undertook a post-doctoral fellowship for Chinese language study in Taiwan. Covering the costs for her international research, she obtained award fellowships from the Mellon Foundation, the American Council of Learned Societies, and the National Endowment for the Humanities. Becoming a fellow of the Center for Chinese Studies at the University of California, Berkeley, and involved in their Chinese Popular Culture project, her studies of ritual praxes in Chinese religions led to her book Ritual Theory, Ritual Practice, published in 1992.

In 1985 she began work at Santa Clara University. Focused on teaching undergraduates, courses she ran included "Ways of Studying Religion," "Asian Religions," "Magic, Science and Religion," "Time and the Millennium" and "Religion and Violence," each of which she based around a core intellectual question. Involved in restructuring the department's curriculum, in 1996 she was awarded the Brutocao Award for Excellence in Curriculum Innovation. She was also involved in the creation of a Women's Faculty Group and Faculty Development Program to aid junior members in the department. In 1998 she was named Bernard Hanley Professor of Religious Studies, that year being awarded the College of Arts and Sciences' Beyma Research Award. In 2001 she was then awarded the President's Award for distinction.

Bell served as chair of the department from 2000 to 2005, then stepping down to become professor emeritus; she took early retirement due to an inability to cope following her diagnosis with multiple sclerosis in 2000. In 2005, the University of Chicago Divinity School named her "Alumna of the Year", on their website praising her as "a great scholar and teacher... [and] a skilled administrator". She began work on a new project, Believing: Assuming Universality, Describing Particularity in the Study of Religion, funded by another fellowship from the National Endowment for the Humanities, but it was left unfinished at the time of her death. Her unfinished manuscript, titled Believing and the Practice of Religion, was later stored in Santa Clara's university library.

Bell died aged 55 on May 23, 2008, after a long illness. She was survived by her mother, sister, three brothers, and husband, Steven Gelber, who was a professor of history at Santa Clara. The chair of the Santa Clara religious studies department, Paul Crowley, described her as "a magnificent colleague, a scholar of international standing, [and] an inspiring mentor to generations of students". Historian of religion Reza Aslan asserted that she would be remembered for generations to come due to her "rigorous scholarship", and that she was "unmatched" as an academic. Having known her personally, Aslan also commented on her "razor sharp wit, her boundless compassion, and refusal to accept anything but the best from her students."

== Published work ==
=== Ritual Theory, Ritual Practice ===
The work was published in two editions, the original Oxford University Press edition in 1992, and an edition also from Oxford University Press in 2009 with a new prologue, which is also available in electronic versions. Both editions share the same pagination.

Religious studies scholar Diane Jonte-Pace opined that the book "changed the framework for understanding the nature and function of ritual", constituting Bell's "greatest contribution" to religious studies. Having known Bell personally, Jonte-Pace thought that the book exhibited her "fearless intellectual style" and "sense of freedom" from past frameworks. Public intellectual Reza Aslan claimed that it "launched a revolution" in the way that scholars understood the subject, becoming "required reading" for students of religious studies.

It was awarded "Best First Book in the History of Religions" from the American Academy of Religion in 1994.

Because of the importance of this work for the field of ritual studies, a survey of the work is in order. The book is organized into three major sections: "The Practice of Ritual Theory" (chapters 1–3), which generally surveys the prior work in the field and situates Bell's book in that context; "The Sense of Ritual" (chapters 4–6), which develops the concept of ritual in terms of bodies and the external systems within which they work; and "Ritual and Power" (chapters 7–9), which frames the discussion of ritual in society, with the attending questions of power and authority.

==== Chapter 1, Constructing Ritual ====
Catherine Bell introduces the study of ritual theory in chapter 1. (19) She presents the idea of dichotomies and how they differentiate between conceptual blueprints (such as beliefs and myths) and ritual (something acted out). Ritual is seen as a performance of conceptual orientations. (19) Bell integrates the ideas and theories of Edward Shils, Durkheim, Stanley Tambiah, Victor Turner, Marshall Sahlins and Claude Levi-Strauss all pertaining to ritual studies. Ritual is understood as a structural mechanism that reintegrates the two opposing dichotomies of thought and action, which is equivalent to the belief and behavior dichotomy. (20) In the sense of community, ritual is seen as a way to create a collective set of beliefs or ideals. In an ever changing society, ritual is the bridge between tradition and constant social change. (20) Ritual symbolism plays a role in the natural struggle of humans with their moral self and external “socio-political” order and constraints of the world. (24) However, this theory of ritual symbolism is seen as incomplete because 1) it does not have any cultural analysis in its explanation and 2) it does not take into consideration the duality of human nature. Bell reestablishes the different dichotomies that are at play against one another: continuity and change, individual experience and social forms, beliefs and behaviors, and thought and action. (25)

==== Chapter 2, Constructing Meaning ====
Catherine Bell maintains the idea that a successful ritual is one in which both cultural and sociological aspects work together. (34, 35) Bell bases her model of ritual on three elements: ritual as an activity, as a fusion of thought and activity, and the dichotomy between actor and thinker. (31) Ritual performs and enacts a system of symbols by integrating the conceptual and dispositional (i.e., the worldview and ethos). Ritual actors integrate worldview and the ethos (conceptual and dispositional) while the theorist integrates these conceptual categories. (32)

Building on the idea of the "acting actor", (31) ritual is now seen as “cultural performance” (37) and is “dramatisized”. (38) Comparing symbols with either indexicality or iconicity allows for many interpretations of symbolism. (42) Iconicity, for example, within Christianity might include all images of a man hanging on a cross symbolize to a crucifix (reference: http://dictionary.reference.com/browse/crucifix) . Ritual may be understood as communication among people, rather than individuals with the divine. (43) An Islamic example might be going to "jumu'ah" so others perceive the actor as pious. After a debate of what meaning is, from the views of Clifford Geertz and Stanley Jeyaraja Tambiah, the next dichotic lens in which to view ritual is drama vs. performance. (43–44) Drama insinuates the individual participating in the ritual is like an actor; they are simply doing the actions and saying things, while their internal thoughts are irrelevant. (43) Performance may simply be the act of the ritual, the participant may be disregarded. Through text analogy one may see ritual as a text. (43) Text may be seen as unchanging, knowable and designed to be knowable, yet when studying text one may interpret and analyze it for oneself; that allows for variation of meaning, change over time, fluidity, which is essential for ritual. (43–45) However, texts are made to communicate directly with a reader, yet not all rituals communicate in the same way. (45)

==== Chapter 5, The Ritual Body ====
The body is seen in various ways with different functionalities and uses, where some view its purpose as a connector between the individual and society. (94) Bell discusses the ideas of Durkheim, Mauss, and Hertz on the body, arguing that bodily expressions are social in nature and acquired in practice. (94) In contrast to this perception, Bell includes Lakoff’s argument that these basic categories are inherent and rooted in the sociobiological body. (96) Bell argues that the body is no longer a physical instrument to perform rituals but in fact a social body that connects to society. (97)

The ritualized body is one that contains a ‘sense’ of values of ritual.(98) The ritual body is produced through interactions of the body with structure and a structured environment, therefore forming a relationship between the body and the environment around it, such as Muslims' prayer in a mosque. The actions that take place in a “ritual space” have a connection to the environment because it molds the way the environment is presented.(100) Yet the physical actions such as standing up straight or kneeling down during salat do not express inner states such as emotions or intentions of the individual. What one individual sees in terms of ritual action is not the display of one's inner state or values.(100) Many rituals take part in certain performances that are mandated by the authority of history, such as Muslims sacrificing animals on the day of Eid Al-Adha. If one believes in the exact repetition of an age-old ritual in the present day then no ritual style is autonomous.(101)

Bell describes a hierarchical system created via linguistic or physical means and organized by the creation of oppositions through ritualization. (104) She describes that although these oppositions may be in contrast, they do not always necessarily balance one another out, and some dominate over others (for example, the receiving of Eucharist (or the inner) dominates the act of lifting and lowering heads (or the outer) in the Catholic church). (102) She describes how the body molds a ritualized agent through the production of a structured environment based on oppositions. (106) However, this interaction of body and environment, or ritualization, simply shifts the nature of social problems to endless circular schemes, where no resolution is produced, only implied. (106–7)

Bell holds, ritualized agents see their purpose, but not what they actually do in ritually changing a situation. This is what she states Althusser views as the “...intrinsic blindness of practice.” (108) As far as ritual and language are concerned, Bell states that there are two main controversies: first, comparing ritual language to verbal/textual language; second, the role of aforementioned verbal/textual language in ritual. (110) Bell mentions Tambiah and other scholars see ritual communication as not only another form of expression, but a way of expressing things that would be impossible to express in any other manner. (111) Bell argues language may be the most important part of some rituals. (113) She closes this section stating, “That is to say within the medium of formally explicit discourse, there is nothing there to grasp, just a variety of culturally instinctive and flexible schemes with which to avoid and undermine everything but the ritual acts themselves.” (114)

Since there is a difference between thought and action in ritual the same idea applies for what theoretical practice sees and does not see itself doing (the object-unity of theoretical discourse). (114) Seeing and not-seeing is the production of agents embodying sense of ritual constituted by and expressed in particular schemes of ritualization.(114) The schemes start to shape the world and spread out causing disposition of ritualization.(115) Shared culture may strategically transform the way one group practices from another in terms of the simple alterations of actions in ritual, which are then deployed around the area. The saying "fake it till you make it" is a good way to sum up the thoughts of Bell because as children are younger they learn so many rituals in our respective faiths but it is not until later in life that they give those rituals meaning and practice them as more than mere action. It is necessary to explore the actual contexts of ritualization by looking at a more accurate actions for ritualization, and the history behind the traditions practiced.(117)

==== Chapter 8, Ritual, Belief, and Ideology ====
In chapter 8, Bell evaluates the symbiotic relationship between ritual and belief. (182) Bell states that ritual is typically viewed as an expression of belief and holds social power, which generates change. (182) Bell believes that religious belief is understood in many different ways and that personal interpretation makes it difficult to analyze in a social context, despite being social in nature. (183) Bell also points out that belief is complex and its association with ritual is challenged. The intended belief behind ritual may be misunderstood by the participants, indicating that their participation in the ritual may not necessarily support or understand the initial institutional belief. (183)

Bell gives a detailed description of two notions of ideology. Although Bell describes two views, she discusses ideology implemented within a society as a way for the dominant class to maintain power and control. (188–92) Bell maintains Gramsci’s belief that the dominated class rarely passively accepts and internalizes the dominant class' values, but instead consents to a more appropriate alternative. (190) She concludes that in this way, ideology is a unifying form of power which creates a greater distribution of control than relationships that exist with the use of pure force. (193)

Bell’s presentation maintains the notion that ritual, political power and legitimation of power are three interdependent theories. Historically, ritual was cast as a mere “artifice” used to conceal the "brute exercise of real power". Thus sacred kingships throughout the past centuries used ritual as a tool to install hierarchy and fulfill political agendas. She invites the readers to question ritual as no longer a self-fulfilling tool but also a power tool for mass governance. Ritual constructs an argument, all while maintaining social order. It does not ‘disguise the exercise of power’ - it is in itself the power.

==== Chapter 9, The Power of Ritualization ====
Power and authority play a strong role in Bell's view of ritual: one does not necessarily have both. (197) A person in power may use that control to affect views within society, limiting other's individual autonomy. (198) The power may be used through symbolic power, where it may be used to help understand the actions and meanings of the world. (199) The top of the hierarchy only has power if the bottom responds to the directions from the top. (200) The individual, she concludes, is ultimately in power. (203) Bell seems to present the power relationship between individuals and society as a complex strategy to organize social norms. (204)

One aspect of ritualization is the differentiation and privileging of certain activities. (204) Features by which these activities differentiate themselves are not universal. Since ritual is a “way of acting” that is distinguished by a certain culture or situation, generalizing ritual strategies into a universal phenomenon undermines its logic. (205) Ritualizing strategies may be implemented without the involvement of religious activities. The purpose of ritualization might be to incite a controversy or to create certain impressions. Any moderately socialized person may use ritualization, both in its cultural and situational forms, as a strategy by distinguishing or blurring the boundary that makes an activity a “specific way of acting”. (206) Bell suggests that the deployment of ritualization is the construction of power relationships - one of domination, consent or resistance. While ritualization may be an effective strategy of power in some certain conditions, it has specific limits and may even be counterproductive in other scenarios. (206) Ritualization has two basic dimensions. The first dimension is the dynamics of the social body and its projection of a structured environment, where ritualization produces and objectifies the constructions of power. (207) The second dimension illustrates the limits of most ritual practice, which is the empowerment of those who were initially controlled by ritual relations, due to the fact that participation in ritual activities requires a conscious consent. (209) Bell then emphasizes that both participation in ritualization and objectification of power are negotiated processes, and since ritualization may foster a misrecognition of the level of consensus, it limits the social efficacy of ritualization and affects both those who dominate and those who are dominated. (210)

Ritualization may be viewed as a source of power and authority for people in a position to influence ritual, and as a source of power for the individual. (211) In one form, ritual may be seen as a “‘blunt tool.’” (212) Bell asserts that ritual power is interpreted as an external power tapped into by whoever holds an office. She maintains that there are three forms of empowerment for those in charge of ritualization: objectification of office, hierarchization of practices, and creating tradition. (211) Furthermore, in some ways ritual defines the self. Tambiah and Bloch in contrast to some other scholars view the formalization of ritual as furthering the divide between one’s sense of self and one’s ritual practices. (216) Bell in part looks at ritual through the lens of individual empowerment. "The person who has prayed to his or her god, appropriating the social schemes of the hegemonic order in terms of an individual redemption, may be stronger because these acts are the very definitions of power, personhood, and the ability to act.” (217–8)

=== Ritual: Perspectives and Dimensions ===
Bell's second major work was published in 1997. She intended it to be "a more holistic and pragmatic orientation to multiple dimensions of the phenomenon of ritual"
