= Symbolic boundaries =

Theory of social grouping

Symbolic boundaries are a theory of how people form social groups proposed by cultural sociologists. Symbolic boundaries are "conceptual distinctions made by social actors ... that separate people into groups and generate feelings of similarity and group membership".

Symbolic boundaries are a necessary but insufficient condition for social change. Only when symbolic boundaries are widely agreed upon can they take on a constraining character and become social boundaries.

== Durkheim ==
Émile Durkheim saw the symbolic boundary between sacred and profane as the most profound of all social facts, and the one from which lesser symbolic boundaries were derived. Rituals - secular or religious - were for Durkheim the means by which groups maintained their symbolic/moral boundaries.

Mary Douglas has subsequently emphasised the role of symbolic boundaries in organising experience, private and public, even in a secular society; while other neo-Durkheimians highlight the role of deviancy as one of revealing and making plain the symbolic boundaries that uphold moral order, and of providing an opportunity for their communal reinforcement. As Durkheim himself put it, "Crime brings together upright consciences and concentrates them...to talk of the event and wax indignant in common", thereby reaffirming the collective barriers that have been breached.

== Transgressing boundaries ==
Prejudice is often the result of crossing the symbolic boundaries that preserve a group's sense of itself - boundaries that, like a nation's frontiers, may in fact be real as well as symbolic. (The ancient ceremony of beating the bounds highlights that overlapping of real and symbolic bounds.) Salman Rushdie has emphasised the role of the migrant as a postmodern representative, transgressing symbolic boundaries, and (potentially at least) demonised by their upholders in the host nation as a result.

Marjorie Garber has explored the role of the transvestite in crossing the symbolic boundaries of gender - something which she considered tended to challenge those of race as well.

== Symbolic/social boundaries ==
Symbolic boundaries are distinct from “social boundaries" that are "objectified forms of social differences manifested in unequal access to an unequal distribution of resources… and social opportunities.”

== Play ==
Playing may be seen as a way of testing social boundaries - the unspoken frames set about social activities. Humour too provides a way of illuminating, testing and perhaps also shifting symbolic boundaries.

== Cultural examples ==
- Michael Jackson, in Garber's opinion, erases and detraumatises not only the boundaries between male and female, youth and age, but also between black and white internalising cultural category crises.

== See also ==
- Boundary-work
- Cognitive schemata
- Imagined communities
- Liminality
- Microsociology
- Moral panic
- Personal boundaries
- Social capital
- Social identity theory
