= Santa Clara University College of Arts and Sciences =

Coordinates: 37°21′4.08″N 121°56′22.87″W

- Motto: Ad Majorem Dei Gloriam (Latin)
- Motto in English: For the Greater Glory of God
- Type: Private Roman Catholic (Jesuit)
- Established: 1851; 175 years ago
- Affiliations: Santa Clara University
- Endowment: $1.54 billion parent institution
- Dean: Daniel Press (July 2020)
- Faculty: 279 (full-time); 136 (part-time)
- Students: 3,025 (2017-18)
- Undergraduates: 2,938
- Postgraduates: 87
- Location: Santa Clara, California, United States
- Colors: Red and White
- Website: www.scu.edu/cas

The Santa Clara University College of Arts and Sciences is a private academic institution at Santa Clara University. It is the largest of the professional schools at Santa Clara University.

== Academics ==
The College of Arts and Sciences at Santa Clara University offers degree programs in the arts, humanities, natural sciences, and social sciences, with interdisciplinary and cross-disciplinary options. As the home of the Core Curriculum, the College serves roughly 5,300 undergraduate students, 2,900 of whom are students within the College.

Made up of 27 departments and programs, the College offers 33 majors and 40 minors for undergraduate students and an M.A. in Pastoral Ministries for graduate students. It serves as the home of the Center for the Arts and Humanities and offers programming through various initiatives, including the Sinatra Chair in the Performing Arts, the Digital Humanities Initiative, and the DeNardo Lectureship in the Health Sciences.

=== Majors ===
- Anthropology
- Art History
- Biochemistry
- Biology
- Chemistry
- Child Studies
- Classical Studies
- Communication
- Computer Science
- Economics
- Engineering Physics
- English
- Environmental Science
- Environmental Studies
- Ethnic Studies
- History
- Individual Studies
- Mathematics
- Modern Languages: French
- Modern Languages: Italian
- Modern Languages: Spanish
- Music
- Neuroscience
- Philosophy
- Physics
- Political Science
- Psychology
- Public Health Science
- Religious Studies
- Sociology
- Studio Art
- Theatre and Dance
- Women's and Gender Studies

=== Minors ===
- Anthropology
- Arabic, Islamic and Middle Eastern Studies
- Art History
- Asian Studies
- Biology
- Biotechnology
- Catholic Studies
- Chemistry
- Classical Studies
- Communication
- Computer Science
- Creative Writing
- Dance
- Economics
- English
- Environmental Studies
- Ethnic Studies
- History
- Latin American Studies
- Mathematics
- Medieval & Renaissance Studies
- Modern Languages: French
- Modern Languages: Italian
- Modern Languages: Japanese
- Modern Languages: Spanish
- Music
- Musical theatre
- Philosophy
- Physics
- Political Science
- Professional Writing
- Public Health Science
- Religious Studies
- Sociology
- Studio Art
- Sustainability
- Theatre
- Theatre Design & Technology
- Urban Education
- Women's & Gender Studies
