= Personal boundaries =

Values set to limit a person's interactions

Personal boundaries or the act of setting boundaries is a life skill that has been popularized by self help authors and support groups since the mid-1980s. Personal boundaries are established by changing one's own response to interpersonal situations, rather than expecting other people to change their behaviors to comply with your boundary. For example, if the boundary is to not interact with a particular person, then one sets a boundary by deciding not to see or engage with that person, and one enforces the boundary by politely declining invitations to events that include that person and by politely leaving the room if that person arrives unexpectedly. The boundary is thus respected without requiring the assistance or cooperation of any other people. Setting a boundary is different from making a request. Setting a boundary is also different from issuing an ultimatum.

The concept of boundaries has been widely adopted by the counseling profession. Universal applicability of the concept has been questioned.

== Concept ==
A boundary is a rule that affects the behavior of the person who chooses to make the rule. The point of a boundary is to control one's own reaction, rather than controlling other people's behavior.

Author and therapist K. C. Davis says "boundaries are an internal understanding of where I end and where you begin. It’s where my feelings end and your feelings begin. It’s where my ability to affect my own decisions and actions end, and your decisions and actions begin."

Setting boundaries does not always require telling anyone what the boundary is or what the consequences are for transgressing it. For example, if a person decides to leave an unwanted discussion, that person may give an unrelated excuse, such as claiming that it is time to do something else, rather than saying that the subject must not be mentioned.

== Usage and application ==
Setting and enforcing boundaries is usually emotionally uncomfortable and requires effort from the person setting the boundary.

Co-Dependents Anonymous recommends setting limits on what members will do to and for people and on what members will allow people to do to and for them, as part of their efforts to establish autonomy from being controlled by other people's thoughts, feelings and problems.

The National Alliance on Mental Illness tells its members that establishing and maintaining values and boundaries will improve the sense of security, stability, predictability and order, in a family even when some members of the family resist. NAMI contends that boundaries encourage a more relaxed, nonjudgmental atmosphere and that the presence of boundaries need not conflict with the need for maintaining an understanding atmosphere.

Examples of boundaries and other responses
| Situation | Response | Category |
|---|---|---|
| Someone drops by without an invitation or notice. | Telling the person that they have to stop coming over unannounced | Request for the other person to change |
| Someone drops by without an invitation or notice. | Not opening the door or letting the uninvited guest inside | Personal boundary |
| Someone regularly discusses a sensitive subject. | Asking the person to not bring up that subject | Request for the other person to change |
| Someone regularly discusses a sensitive subject. | Silently resolving not to let that person's view of the subject affect one's own values, beliefs, or thoughts | Personal boundary |
| Someone regularly discusses a sensitive subject. | Changing the subject to a mutually acceptable subject | Personal boundary |
| Someone regularly discusses a sensitive subject. | Not answering the phone if the person calls | Personal boundary |
| Someone is communicating in a disrespectful manner. | Saying "Don’t talk to me that way" | Request for the other person to change |
| Someone is communicating in a disrespectful manner. | Ignoring a disrespectful message | Personal boundary |
| Someone is communicating in a disrespectful manner. | Ending the conversation, with an invitation to continue it another time | Personal boundary |
| Someone frequently cancels plans at the last minute. | Avoiding making plans in advance with this person | Personal boundary |
| A stressful work situation bleeds into family and home life (or the other way around). | Naming what is happening (e.g., "I am still upset about it, even though I want to leave that problem at work") and making an effort to refocus on the immediate task or situation | Personal boundary |
| A stressful work situation bleeds into family and home life (or the other way around). | Using a physical ritual to help mentally separate work time from home time (e.g., taking a shower, putting on a uniform) | Personal boundary |

== Process ==
=== Critical aspects ===
Boundary setting is the practice of openly communicating and asserting personal values as a way to preserve and protect against having them compromised or violated. The three critical aspects of managing personal boundaries are:

- Defining values: A healthy relationship is an “inter-dependent” relationship of two “independent” people. Healthy individuals should establish values that they honor and defend regardless of the nature of a relationship (core or independent values). Healthy individuals should also have values that they negotiate and adapt in an effort to bond with and collaborate with others (inter-dependent values).
- Asserting boundaries: In this model, individuals use verbal and nonverbal communications to assert intentions, preferences and define what is inbounds and out-of-bounds with respect to their core or independent values. When asserting values and boundaries, communications should be present, appropriate, clear, firm, protective, flexible, receptive, and collaborative.
- Honoring and defending: Making decisions consistent with the personal values when presented with life choices or confronted or challenged by controlling people or people not taking responsibility for their own life. In a dysfunctional relationship, respecting one's own boundaries by honoring and defending them often provokes unwanted and uncomfortable responses from the people who are crossing the boundary lines. They may respond with disapproval, shame, resentment, pressure not to change the relationship, or other behaviors designed to restore the familiar old behavior patterns.

Having healthy values and boundaries is a lifestyle, not a quick fix to a relationship dispute.

Values are constructed from a mix of conclusions, beliefs, opinions, attitudes, past experiences and social learning. Jacques Lacan considers values to be layered in a hierarchy, reflecting “all the successive envelopes of the biological and social status of the person” from the most primitive to the most advanced.

Personal values and boundaries operate in two directions, affecting both the incoming and outgoing interactions between people. These are sometimes referred to as the 'protection' and 'containment' functions.

=== Scope ===
The three most commonly mentioned categories of values and boundaries are:

- Physical – Personal space and touch considerations; physical intimacy
- Mental – Thoughts and opinions
- Emotional – Feelings; emotional intimacy

Some authors have expanded this list with additional or specialized categories such as spirituality, truth, and time/punctuality.

=== Assertiveness levels ===
Nina Brown proposed four boundary types:

- Soft – A person with soft boundaries merges with other people's boundaries. Someone with a soft boundary is easily a victim of psychological manipulation.
- Spongy – A person with spongy boundaries is like a combination of having soft and rigid boundaries. They permit less emotional contagion than soft boundaries but more than those with rigid. People with spongy boundaries are unsure of what to let in and what to keep out.
- Rigid – A person with rigid boundaries is closed or walled off so nobody can get close either physically or emotionally. This is often the case if someone has been the victim of physical, emotional, psychological, or sexual abuse. Rigid boundaries can be selective which depend on time, place or circumstances and are usually based on a bad previous experience in a similar situation.
- Flexible – Similar to spongy rigid boundaries but the person exercises more control. The person decides what to let in and what to keep out, is resistant to emotional contagion and psychological manipulation, and is difficult to exploit.

=== Unilateral vs collaborative ===
There are also two main ways that boundaries are set:

- Unilateral boundaries – One person decides to impose a standard on the relationship, regardless of whether others support it. For example, one person may decide to never mention an unwanted subject and to make a habit of leaving the room, ending phone calls, or deleting messages without replying if the subject is mentioned by others.
- Collaborative boundaries – Everyone in the relationship group agrees, either tacitly or explicitly, that a particular standard should be upheld. For example, the group may decide not to discuss an unwanted subject, and then all members individually avoid mentioning it and work together to change the subject if someone mentions it.

== Situations that can challenge personal boundaries ==
=== Communal influences ===
Freud described the loss of conscious boundaries that may occur when an individual is in a unified, fast-moving crowd.

Almost a century later, Steven Pinker took up the theme of the loss of personal boundaries in a communal experience, noting that such occurrences could be triggered by intense shared ordeals like hunger, fear or pain, and that such methods were traditionally used to create liminal conditions in initiation rites. Jung had described this as the absorption of identity into the collective unconscious.

Rave culture has also been said to involve a dissolution of personal boundaries, and a merger into a binding sense of communality.

=== Unequal power relationships ===
Also unequal relations of political and social power influence the possibilities for marking cultural boundaries and more generally the quality of life of individuals. Unequal power in personal relationships, including abusive relationships, can make it difficult for individuals to mark boundaries.

=== Dysfunctional families ===
This life skill is particularly applicable in environments with controlling people or people not taking responsibility for their own lives.

- Overly demanding parents In the dysfunctional family the child learns to become attuned to the parent's needs and feelings instead of the other way around.
- Overly demanding children Parenting is a role that requires a certain amount of self-sacrifice and giving a child's needs a high priority. A parent can, nevertheless, be codependent towards a child if the caretaking or parental sacrifice reaches unhealthy or destructive levels.
- Codependent relationships Codependency often involves placing a lower priority on one's own needs, while being excessively preoccupied with the needs of others. Codependency can occur in any type of relationship, including family, work, friendship, and also romantic, peer or community relationships. While a healthy relationship depends on the emotional space provided by personal boundaries, codependent personalities have difficulties in setting such limits, so that defining and protecting boundaries efficiently may be for them a vital part of regaining mental health. In a codependent relationship, the codependent's sense of purpose is based on making extreme sacrifices to satisfy their partner's needs. Codependent relationships signify a degree of unhealthy clinginess, where one person does not have self-sufficiency or autonomy. One or both parties depend on the other for fulfilment. There is usually an unconscious reason for continuing to put another person's life first — often the mistaken notion that self-worth comes from other people.
- Mental illness in the family People with certain mental conditions are predisposed to controlling behavior including those with obsessive compulsive disorder, paranoid personality disorder, borderline personality disorder, and narcissistic personality disorder, attention deficit disorder, and the manic state of bipolar disorder.
- Borderline personality disorder (BPD): There is a tendency for loved ones of people with BPD to slip into caretaker roles, giving priority and focus to problems in the life of the person with BPD rather than to issues in their own lives. Too often in these relationships, the codependent will gain a sense of worth by being "the sane one" or "the responsible one". Often, this shows up prominently in families with strong Asian cultures because of beliefs tied to the cultures.
- Narcissistic personality disorder (NPD): For those involved with a person with NPD, values and boundaries are often challenged as narcissists have a poor sense of self and often do not recognize that others are fully separate and not extensions of themselves. Those who meet their needs and those who provide gratification may be treated as if they are part of the narcissist and expected to live up to their expectations.

== See also ==
- Bodily integrity
- Boundaries of the mind
- Comfort zone
- Symbolic boundaries
