= Cognitive valence theory =

Psychological framework for understanding relations between pairs of people

Cognitive valence theory (CVT) is a theoretical framework that describes and explains the process of intimacy exchange within a dyad relationship. Peter A. Andersen, PhD created the cognitive valence theory to answer questions regarding intimacy relationships among colleagues, close friends and intimate friends, married couples and family members. Intimacy or immediacy behavior is that behavior that provides closeness or distance within a dyad relationship. Closeness projects a positive feeling in a relationship, and distance projects a negative feeling within a relationship. Intimacy or immediacy behavior can be negatively valenced or positively valenced. Valence, associated with physics, is used here to describe the degree of negativity or positivity in expected information. If your partner perceives your actions as negative, then the interaction may repel your partner away from you. If your partner perceives your actions as positive, then the interaction may be accepted and may encourage closeness. Affection and intimacy promotes positive valence in a relationship. CVT uses non-verbal and verbal communications criteria to analyze behavioral situations.

== Cognitive valence theory: the focus of CVT ==
CVT focuses on how intimate relationships are initiated and why only a few relationships are extended past initial contact. CVT employs six factors or schemata to explain verbal and non-verbal intimacy behaviors, interpersonal perceptions, physiological arousal, social cognition and relational outcomes within a specified relationship. CVT utilizes six types of schemata that regulate interpersonal interaction: culture, personality, interpersonal valence, situation, state, and the relationship. Each schema explores intimacy or immediacy behavior when interlaced with human emotion. CVT focuses on these six schemata in relations to moderate levels of arousal in human emotions. Moderate levels of arousal are acceptable in a dyad relationship, but high levels of arousal may cause undue excitement, panic, fear, anger and disorientation.

== Nonverbal and verbal communications ==
Nonverbal communication is the process of communications by sending and receiving messages without speaking. Intimate relations may be affected by the use of nonverbal communications. Nonverbal communications are transmitted through messaging that utilizes haptic communications (touching, hugs, kisses and caressing someone); body language (physical appearance, posture, gestures and eye contact); oculesics (or eye behavior, including pupil dilation); kinesics (facial expressions and receptive contact from others); and chronemics (time spent with someone else or waiting for someone). All these nonverbal behaviors can affect intimacy or immediacy within a relationship.

Verbal communication or dialogue communications also plays an important part in a dyad relationship. While nonverbal communication provides a forum conducive to wordless conversation, verbal conversation can provide the monologue or dialogue to vocally express personal feelings, emotions and supplement nonverbal actions. However, research has shown that only 7% of all communications is directly related to verbal communications. Research further reports that 38% of communications are by the tone of voice and 55% of communication is determined by body language—posture, gestures and eye contact.

=== Negative and positive valence ===
Negative valence behavior is nonverbal communication transmission of a behavioral feeling or emotion received in a negative manner. The receiver perceives the negative transmission and may repel your contact or interaction. As in physics, negative particles repel which may cause the receiver of the transmission or communication to avoid your contact. As the example stated above, initial contact of noticing another person in the grocery store or gas station may not be returned, through an acknowledgement of the initiator's smile or gesture or the gesture of acknowledgement may purport a stare, frown or other look suggesting “leave me alone” or “not interested.” Intimacy or immediacy may be detrimental to a relationship if that immediacy is negatively accepted by the receiver.

Positive valence behavior is another non-verbal transmission of a behavioral feeling or emotion from one person to another and received in a positive manner. The receiver perceives the positive transmission and may be attracted to that person. Positive behavior may affect intimacy or immediacy within the dyad relationship, but this positive behavior must be recognized and acknowledged by the receiver or partner. Initial contact within an impending dyad relationship may be as simple as noticing another person in a grocery store or gas station. A first look or glance from the initiator may be returned with a smile or gesture of acknowledgement by the receiver. This gesture may then be returned to the initiator as a positive, and further contact may be encouraged.

== Cognitive schemata ==
Andersen (1993, Planap, 1985) suggests that cognitive schemata or our social knowledge help interpret various social interactions. CVT incorporates these six schemata into the regulation or guidance of interpersonal interaction.

=== Culture ===
Culture is the total expression of one's behavior patterns, arts, values, goals, and practices of a population or community. Geertz (1973) further argues “…this school of thought holds that culture is composed of psychological structures by means of which individuals or groups of individuals guide their behavior”. Culture plays a definitive role in the formation of human behavior. In some cultures, it is permissible to hold hands; other cultures this open act of compassion is forbidden. Looking or gazing upon another is accepted; other cultures, the eyes are not directed at anyone not of your family. Public affection is acceptable in one country but to kiss, touch or hold someone's hand is blasphemous. This behavior may be deemed negatively valenced.

=== Personality ===
Personality or personality traits also affect intimacy or immediacy within a dyad relationship. Just as humans differ in their size, weight and emotional attributes, human personalities differ in their degree of sociability, their likes and dislikes, the level of tolerance towards shyness and openness and their adherence to proxemics or the distance displaced from one person towards another. Essentially, this is where knowing your partner's personality is crucial to a happy relationship. This relationship promotes positive valence or misinterpreting your partner's personality may promote a negative valence.

=== Interpersonal valence ===
Interpersonal Valence can be best described as a nonverbal communication typology. A touch from someone you like is received differently than an unwanted touch. Interpersonal valence has a positive affect for socially and physically attractive people and a negative valence for those not so attractive. This degree of attraction may be within the initiator's point of view or may also be perceived from the receiver.

=== State ===
Andersen argues here that state is the internal, short-term condition affecting communications. This form of state suggests that external behavioral situations affect one's internal behavioral, coping adaptability. Simply, disagreements at home or at the office signal a negative valence of immediacy or intimacy. An argument with your boss or a disrespectful employee may lower your internal coping adaptability, and negative valence emerges. However, one's acceptance of intimacy or immediacy is higher when positive valence is experienced. A good day at the office, congratulations on the successful completion a special project or a home cooked meal may amplify positive valence and increase immediacy or intimacy.

=== The relationship ===
The relationship is the most important part of the cognitive schemata model. Partnership within a dyad has numerous labels. Within relationships (interpersonal relationships), we label our dyad partners as acquaintances, friends, colleagues, professional coworkers, personal friends, family members, fellow college students and college professors and, those people whose paths cross with ours simply as convenient contacts. Each dyad partner, whether initial or long-term may display a level of intimacy or immediacy based on a degree of appropriateness for the situation. Public forums are the stage in which positive or negative valence performs. As stated earlier, an unwanted look or a touch may heighten the degree of negative valence. In contrast, a look or an accepted touch may heighten the degree of positive valence and be the most desirable behavior for each of the dyad partners. Relationships are dependent upon both partners and their commitment to the dyad. Relationships therefore are fragile. Cognitive Valence Theory or CVT offers one explanation for this fragility. Negative valence received from any of the cognitive schemata can result in a negative relational outcome. Negative valence reduces the intimacy or immediacy strength within a relationship. Negative valence can also thwart healthy dyad growth by heightening the lack of love and care within the dyad. Positive valence acts in a 180 degree fashion as positive feeling promotes growth and strengthens the love and care within the dyad. With positive valence, there can still be risks, but the rewards may outweigh the costs.

=== Valence violations ===
As mentioned above, valence is the degree of positivity or negativity in expected information. Relational outcomes will become negatively valenced when violations occur within the six schemata. Negative valence here can be associated with the amount of relationships we initially form and the amount of relationships that become long lasting. Andersen's cognitive valence theory points out (under relational outcome) how violations of any of the six schemata will affect a dyad relationship. Negative violations can result in (1) negative cognitive and affective appraisals of your partner; (2) compensation/reduction intimacy behaviors, and (3) reductions in relational closeness or disengagement. The theory further describes the degree of positivity associated with positive relational outcomes within a dyad relationship. Andersen's cognitive valence theory also points that (under relational outcome) how positive valenced intimacy can show (1) positive cognitive and affective appraisals of one's partner; (2) reciprocity or an increase in intimacy behaviors, and (3) increase in relational growth and closeness.

== Related theories ==
Expectancy violations theory (EVT) focuses on people's reactions to unexpected human behavior. Expectancies are primarily based upon social norms and specific characteristics of the communicators. EVT requires determining whether one interactant's behavior change qualifies as a positive or negative violation. Within the realm of involvement and immediacy changes, it predicts that (a) unexpected positive behavior by a positively valenced interactant will produce reciprocal behavior, (b) unexpected negative behavior by a positively valenced interactant will produce compensatory behavior, (c) unexpected negative behavior by a negatively valenced interactant will produce reciprocal negative behavior, and (d) unexpected positive behavior by a negatively valenced interactant may produce either reciprocal or compensatory behavior, depending on which is more salient – the valence of the behavior or the valence of the interactant. The Arousal-Labeling theory (ALT) likewise posits that both compensation and reciprocity may occur, but the focus of this model is on how the undifferentiated arousal engendered by a partner's behavior change is effectively labeled – positive labels producing reciprocity and negative labels producing compensation. Discrepancy-Arousal theory (DAT) combines arousal and affect with expectancies, predicting that discrepancies from expected behavior patterns produce arousal change, that moderate arousal change is effectively positive and elicits approach (typically reciprocity), and that high arousal change is effectively negative and elicits avoidance (typically compensation).

== See also ==
- Communication accommodation theory (CAT) and Uncertainty reduction theory (URT)
- Interpersonal communication

== Conclusion ==
Cognitive valence theory seeks to describe and explain the process of intimacy exchange within a dyad relationship. CVT accomplishes this process through the employment of six schemata: culture, personality, interpersonal valence, situation, state, and the relationship. Intimacy behaviors provide the strength and positivity to generate close, personal friendships. These friendships may be found in the home family, an impending personal relationship and/or marriage. Additionally, if you want to have a happy marriage, be the kind of person who generates positive energy and sidesteps negative energy rather than empowering it.
