= St. Claire =

While there are no saints named St. Claire in English, there are several saints named St. Clare. They are spelled "Ste. Claire" in French.

- Clare of Assisi (1194 – 1253), founder of the Poor Clares and companion of St. Francis of Assisi
- Clare of Montefalco (c. 1268 – 1308), also known as Saint Clare of the Cross
- Claire de Remiremont, or Clarisse or Saint Cécile or Sigeberge, abbess of the Abbey of Remiremont in the Vosges
- Claire Argolanti, died 1346
- Claire Gambacorti

There is also a traditional third-century French (male) bishop and saint Clair of Nantes.

St. Claire might also refer to:

== Places ==
- Cape St. Claire, Maryland, an unincorporated community and a census-designated place in Anne Arundel County, Maryland
- Castel Sainte-Claire, a villa in France
- Lake St. Clair, a lake between Ontario and Michigan
- The Westin San Jose, formerly The Sainte Claire Hotel, a hotel in San Jose, California
- Sainte-Claire, Quebec, a village in Quebec
- Upper St. Clair Township, Pennsylvania, a township located 10 miles southwest of Pittsburgh, founded in 1788

== People ==
- Bonnie St. Claire, stage name of Dutch singer Bonje Cornelia Swart
- Ebba St. Claire, American baseball player
- Erin St. Claire, pen name of American author Sandra Brown
- Jasmin St. Claire, pornographic actress
- Julie St. Claire, American actress, director, and producer
- Josephine Sainte-Claire, French ballerina
- Randy St. Claire, American baseball player, son of Ebba
- St. Claire Drake, American sociologist
- St. Claire Pollock, honored by New York's Amiable Child Monument
- René Lepage de Sainte-Claire, Canadian pioneer
- Tracy St. Claire, Canadian politician

== Transport ==
- Wills Sainte Claire, American automobile
- SS Ste. Claire, American steamship

== Variant spellings ==
See also:

- Saint Clair (disambiguation)
- Saint Clare (disambiguation)
- Santa Clara (disambiguation) (Spanish and Portuguese)
- Santa Chiara (disambiguation) (Italian)
- Santa Clarita (disambiguation)
- Sinclair (disambiguation)
