= Saint Clare =

Saint Clare may refer to:

== People ==
- Saint Clare of Assisi (1194–1253), the founder of the Poor Clares and companion of Saint Francis of Assisi
- Saint Clare of Montefalco (1268–1308), the Italian abbess also called Saint Clare of the Cross

== Other uses ==
- Saint Clare (film), a 2024 American thriller film starring Bella Thorne
- MV St Clare, a car ferry operating between Portsmouth and the Isle of Wight, England
- St. Clare Castle, a mansion in Appley on the Isle of Wight, England
- St. Clare's (series), a series of children's books by Enid Blyton
- St. Clare Entertainment, an American television production company
- Clare (given name)

== See also ==
- St. Clare's (disambiguation)
- St. Clare's Church (disambiguation)
- St. Clare's Convent (disambiguation)
- St. Clare's Hospital (disambiguation)
- St. Clare's Monastery (disambiguation)
- St Clare's School (disambiguation)
- St Clears, Carmarthenshire, Wales
- Saint Clair (disambiguation)
- St. Claire (disambiguation)
- Santa Chiara (disambiguation)
- Santa Clara (disambiguation)
