= St. Clare's =

St Clare's can refer to:

- St. Clare's (series), children's books by Enid Blyton about a fictitious boarding school
- St Clare's, Middlesbrough, a Roman Catholic parish in Middlesbrough Diocese, England
- St. Clare's, Oxford, an independent international boarding school in Oxford, England
- St Clare's College, Canberra, a private school in Canberra, Australia
- St Clare's College, Waverley, a day school for girls in Sydney, Australia
- St. Clare's Priory, Stockholm, a former nunnery in Stockholm, Sweden

== See also ==
- Saint Clare (disambiguation)
- St. Clare's Church (disambiguation)
- St. Clare's Convent (disambiguation)
- St. Clare's Hospital (disambiguation)
- St. Clare's Monastery (disambiguation)
- St Clare's School (disambiguation)
