= St Clere =

St Clere, St. Clere and Saint Clere are variants of the name Sinclair, notably found in Essex, England. They are the names of numerous people and things, among them:

- St Clere (family), a noble family from Danbury, Essex
- St Clere's School, Stanford-le-Hope, Essex
- Saint Clere, Kansas
- St. Clere Township, Pottawatomie County, Kansas
- St Clere, Kent, England
- George John St Clere Gage, 7th Viscount Gage
- Collet of St. Clere, Kent, an extinct English baronetcy
- Sir Thomas St Clere, a 15th-century English landholder

== See also ==
- Saint Clair (disambiguation)
- Sinclair (disambiguation)
