= Clarita =

Clarita may refer to:

== Film ==
- Clarita (film), a 2019 Philippine horror film

== Places ==
- Clarita, Oklahoma, US
- Clarita Formation, a geologic formation in Oklahoma

== People ==
- Clarita Berenbau, or Clara Berenbau (1980–2013), Uruguayan presenter, actress, and writer
- Clarita Carlos (born 1946), Philippine political analyst and academic
- Clarita de Quiroz (born 1987), Scottish singer, songwriter, and model
- Clarita de Uriburu (1908-1995), Argentinian socialite
- Clarita Heath (1916–2003), American alpine skier
- Clarita Hunsberger (1906–2001), American diver
- Clarita Stauffer, or Clara Stauffer (1904–1984), Spanish Falangist and Nazi ratline operator
- Clarita Vidal (1883–1919), Edwardian musical comedy actress
- Clarita von Trott (1917–2013), German medical doctor and psychotherapist, widow of Nazi resister Adam von Trott zu Solz

== See also ==
- Claritas (disambiguation)
- Santa Clarita (disambiguation)
