= Sinclair Township =

Sinclair Township may refer to one of the following places:

In Canada

- Sinclair Township, Muskoka District Municipality, Ontario (historical)

In the United States

- Sinclair Township, Jewell County, Kansas
- Sinclair Township, Clearwater County, Minnesota
- Sinclair Township, Stutsman County, North Dakota

See also

- St. Clair Township (disambiguation)
- Sinclair (disambiguation)
