= St. Clair Township =

St. Clair Township may refer to:

Places in Canada

- St. Clair Township, Ontario

Places in the United States

- St. Clair Township, St. Clair County, Illinois
- St. Clair Township, Benton County, Iowa
- St. Clair Township, Monona County, Iowa
- St. Clair Township, St. Clair County, Michigan
- St. Clair Township, Butler County, Ohio
- St. Clair Township, Columbiana County, Ohio
- St. Clair Township, Allegheny County, Pennsylvania, a former township
- St. Clair Township, Pennsylvania
- and also:
  - East St. Clair Township, Bedford County, Pennsylvania
  - Upper St. Clair Township, Pennsylvania
  - West St. Clair Township, Pennsylvania

== See also ==
- Sinclair Township (disambiguation)
- Saint Clair (disambiguation)
