= 1973 Salta earthquake =

- Location within Argentina
- UTC time: 1973-11-19 11:19:35
- ISC event: 754567
- USGS-ANSS: n/a
- Local date: 19 November 1973
- Magnitude: 5.6 mb
- Depth: 24 kilometers (15 mi)
- Epicenter: 24.3412°S 64.3447°W
- Areas affected: Salta, Argentina
- Max. intensity: MMI VII (Very strong)
- Casualties: None

The 1973 Salta earthquake occurred in the Province of Salta, in the Republic of Argentina, at a depth of 12 kilometres (7.5 mi), on 19 November, with a magnitude of 5.6 on the mb scale.

== Damage and casualties ==
The destructive force of the 1973 Salta earthquake was measured at VII (Very strong) on the Mercalli intensity scale. It caused damage to communities towards the east of the provinces of Salta and Jujuy, particularly in Santa Clara (Jujuy).

== See also ==
- List of earthquakes in 1973
- List of earthquakes in Argentina
