= Santa Chiara =

Santa Chiara is Italian for Saint Clare, and may refer to:

== Churches ==
- Basilica di Santa Chiara, in Assisi
- Monastero di Santa Chiara, a church in San Marino
- Santa Chiara a Vigna Clara, a church in Rome
- Santa Chiara, Bra, a church in Bra, Cuneo, Piedmont, Italy
- Santa Chiara, Camerino, a church and monastery in Camerino, Macerata, Marche, Italy
- Santa Chiara, Carpi, in Carpi, Emilia-Romagna, Italy
- Santa Chiara, Correggio, a church and convent in Correggio, Reggio Emilia, Emilia-Romagna, Italy
- Santa Chiara, Fanano, a church and convent in Fanano, Modena, Emilia-Romagna, Italy
- Santa Chiara, Naples, a religious complex in Naples, Italy
- Santa Chiara all'Albergaria, a monastery and church in Palermo, Italy
- Santa Chiara, Pieve di Cento, a church in Pieve di Cento, Emilia-Romagna, Italy
- Santa Chiara, Pisa, a church in Pisa, Tuscany, Italy
- Santa Chiara, Rimini, a church in Rimini, Italy
- Santa Chiara, Rome, a church in Rome, Italy
- Santa Chiara, Sansepolcro, a former church in Sansepolcro, Arezzo, Tuscany, Italy
- Santa Chiara, Treia, a church in Treia, Macerata, Marche, Italy
- Santa Chiara, Turin, a church in Turin, Italy
- Santa Chiara, Urbania, a former church and convent in Urbania, Marche, Italy
- Santi Cosma e Damiano, Alcamo, a church and convent in Alcamo, Trapani, Sicily, Italy, also called Chiesa di Santa Chiara

== People ==
- St. Clare of Assisi, founder of the Poor Clares and companion of St. Francis
- St. Clare of Montefalco, an Augustinian nun and abbess of the 13th century
- Expressionist Master of Santa Chiara (fl. 1290–1330), an Umbrian painter

== See also ==
- St. Clare's Church (disambiguation)
