= Claritas =

Claritas may refer to:

- Claritas (typeface), a modified version of Times New Roman
- Claritas Fossae, an area of highland terrain on Mars
- Claritas Rupes, a scarp on Mars
- Claritas Genomics, a genetic and genomic testing lab affiliated with Boston Children's Hospital, Massachusetts, US
- Claritas Prizm, a system of US demographic classification developed by Claritas, Inc.

== See also ==
- Clarita (disambiguation)
