= Saint Clair =

Saint Clair (also spelled St. Clair or St Clair, and sometimes pronounced "Sinclair") may refer to:

== Saints ==
- Clair of Nantes (3rd century), first bishop of Nantes, the Saint named Clair
- Clare of Assisi (1194–1253), source name for many "St. Clair" place names

== Places ==
=== Australia ===
- St Clair, South Australia, a newer suburb of Adelaide
- St Clair, New South Wales, a suburb of Sydney
- Lake St Clair (Tasmania), a lake in the Central Highlands area of Tasmania

=== Canada ===
- St. Clair, Ontario
- St. Clair Beach, Ontario
- St. Clair Carhouse, a former streetcar facility located in Toronto
- St. Clair River
- St. Clair station, a subway station located in Toronto
- St. Clair West station, another subway station located in Toronto
- St. Clair Avenue, located in Toronto
- St. Clair College, located in Southwestern Ontario
- St. Clair National Wildlife Area, located in Southwestern Ontario

=== France ===
- Hérouville-Saint-Clair, in the Calvados département
- Saint-Clair, Ardèche
- Saint-Clair, Lot
- Saint-Clair, Tarn-et-Garonne
- Saint-Clair, Vienne
- Saint-Clair-d'Arcey, in the Eure département
- Saint-Clair-de-Halouze, in the Orne département
- Saint-Clair-de-la-Tour, in the Isère département
- Saint-Clair-du-Rhône, in the Isère département
- Saint-Clair-sur-Epte, in the Val-d'Oise département
- Saint-Clair-sur-Galaure, in the Isère département
- Saint-Clair-sur-l'Elle, in the Manche département
- Saint-Clair-sur-les-Monts, in the Seine-Maritime département
- Saint-Clair, a district of the commune of Le Lavandou, in the Var département

=== United States ===
- St. Clair County, Alabama
- Saint Clair, Georgia
- St. Clair County, Illinois
- St. Clair Township, Benton County, Iowa
- St. Clair, Michigan
- St. Clair Shores, Michigan
- St. Clair, Minnesota
- St. Clair, Missouri
- St. Clair County, Missouri
- St. Clair, Pennsylvania, in Schuylkill County
- St. Clair, Blair County, Pennsylvania
- St. Clair (Pittsburgh), Pennsylvania, a neighborhood of Pittsburgh
- St. Clair Village, of the Pittsburgh Housing Authority
- St. Clair Township (disambiguation)
- Upper St. Clair Township, Pennsylvania
- Saint Clair, Tennessee

=== Other places ===
- St Clair, Port of Spain, Trinidad and Tobago
- St Clair, New Zealand, a suburb of Dunedin

== People ==
=== Surname ===
- Arthur St. Clair (1737–1818), U.S. revolutionary general
- Ashley St. Clair (born 1998), U.S. political commentator
- Blair St. Clair (born 1995), American drag queen
- Bob St. Clair (1931–2015), American sportsman
- Charlie St. Clair (1950–2026), American non-profit leader and politician
- Dayne St. Clair (born 1997), Canadian soccer goalkeeper
- Earl St. Clair, American musician
- Gairy St. Clair (born 1975), Australian boxer
- Herbert M. St. Clair (1868–1949), American businessman, politician
- Isla St Clair (born 1952), Scottish singer
- James D. St. Clair (1920–2001), American lawyer
- James St Clair-Erskine, 2nd Earl of Rosslyn (1762–1837), a Scottish soldier and politician
- Jean Helen St. Clair Campbell, Girl Guide Chief Commissioner for the British Commonwealth
- Jeffrey St. Clair (born 1959), American journalist
- Lindi St Clair (born 1952), British political campaigner
- Malcolm St. Clair (filmmaker) (1897–1952), American film director, writer, producer, and actor
- Malcolm St Clair (politician) (1927–2004), British Conservative Party politician
- Margaret St. Clair (1911–1995), American writer
- Matthew St. Clair, American environmentalist
- Richard St. Clair (born 1946), American composer and poet
- Sally St. Clair (died 1782), American soldier
- Stuart St. Clair (born 1949), Australian lobbyist and politician
- Tavien St. Clair (born 2006), American football player
- Terry St Clair (born 1951), British singer-songwriter
- Veronica St. Clair (born 1994), American actress
- William Saint-Clair (disambiguation), multiple people

=== Given name ===
- St Clair Leacock, member of parliament in Saint Vincent and the Grenadines
- St. Clair Lee (1944–2011), singer and member of The Hues Corporation
- St. Clair McKelway (1905–1980), writer and editor for The New Yorker magazine
- St. Clair Smith (1889–1988), Justice of the South Dakota Supreme Court
- Saint Clair Cemin (born 1951), Brazilian sculptor

== Other ==
- Saint-Clair (grape), another name for the French wine grape Saint-Pierre Doré
- SS Ste. Claire
- St. Clair, a predecessor of the Lake Cities (Amtrak train)
- St. Clair Entertainment Group, a discount music distributor
- St. Clair's Falls
- St. Clair Winery
- St. Clair (collection), 1986 poetry collection by John A. Scott

== See also ==
- Saint Clare (disambiguation)
- Santa Clara (disambiguation) (Spanish and Portuguese)
- St. Clair County (disambiguation)
- St. Claire (disambiguation)
- Sinclair (disambiguation)
- Clair (disambiguation)
