= Ryot Covered Bridge =

- U.S. National Register of Historic Places
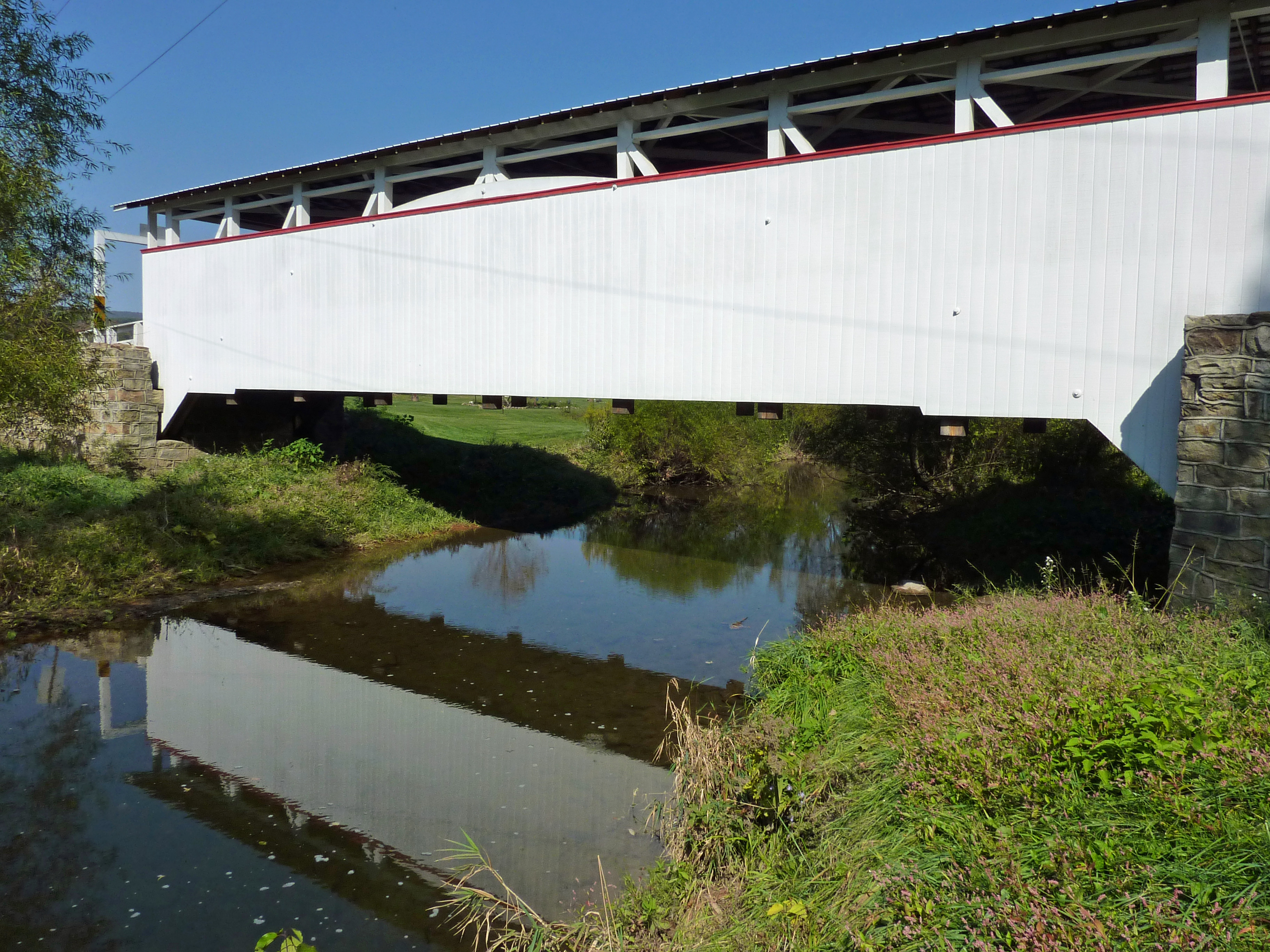
- The bridge in October 2010

- Location within Pennsylvania Location within the United States
- Location: South of Alum Bank on Township 559, northwest of Fishertown, West St. Clair Township, Pennsylvania
- Coordinates: 40°8′32″N 78°37′30″W
- Area: less than one acre
- MPS: Bedford County Covered Bridges TR
- NRHP reference No.: 80003416
- Added to NRHP: April 10, 1980

The Ryot Covered Bridge is an historic wooden covered bridge in West St. Clair Township in Bedford County, Pennsylvania, United States.

It was listed on the National Register of Historic Places in 1980.

== History and architectural features ==
This historic structure is a low to medium Burr Truss bridge with a shallow gable roof. It is one of fifteen historic covered bridges that are located in Bedford County. It was damaged by fire in 2002, and reconstructed.

It was listed on the National Register of Historic Places in 1980. A request to remove the bridge from the National Register was submitted after it was badly damaged by a fire in 2002.

=== Rehabilitation, fire and restoration ===
The bridge was set on fire by teenage arsonists in 2002. Most of the wooden parts of the bridge were badly damaged. The Ryot Bridge was rehabilitated only seven years earlier, so most of the added steel supports remained intact, along with the stone abutments. The bridge was restored by P. Joseph Lehman, Inc., at a total cost of $300,000.
