= Dr. Knisley Covered Bridge =

- U.S. National Register of Historic Places
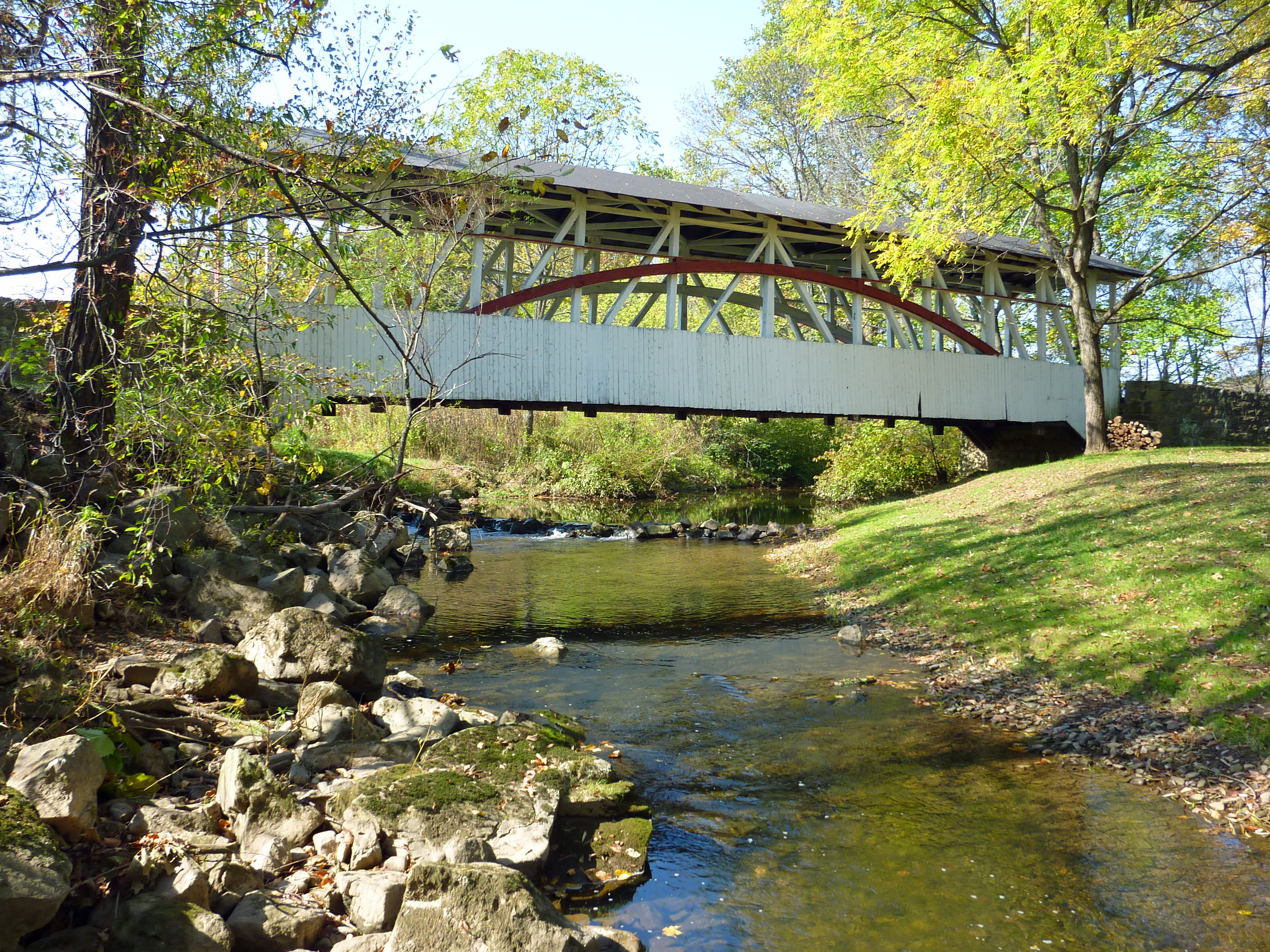
- The bridge in October 2010

- Location within Pennsylvania Location within the United States
- Location: Southeast of Alum Bank on Legislative Route 05098, West St. Clair Township, Pennsylvania
- Coordinates: 40°9′36″N 78°36′8″W
- Area: less than one acre
- MPS: Bedford County Covered Bridges TR
- NRHP reference No.: 80003411
- Added to NRHP: April 10, 1980

The Dr. Knisley Covered Bridge is a historic wooden covered bridge located at West St. Clair Township in Bedford County, Pennsylvania, USA. It is an 80-foot-long (24 m), medium Burr Truss bridge with a shallow gable roof. It crosses Dunning Creek. It is one of 15 historic covered bridges in Bedford County.

It was listed on the National Register of Historic Places in 1980.
