= Sinckler (surname) =

Sinckler is a surname. Notable people with the surname include:

- Christopher Sinckler (born 1967), Barbadian politician
- Kyle Sinckler (born 1993), English professional rugby union player

== See also ==
- Sinclair (surname)
- St. Clair (disambiguation)
