= Clare of Assisi =

Foundress of the Franciscan Second Order and saint

Saint Clare of Assisi OSC
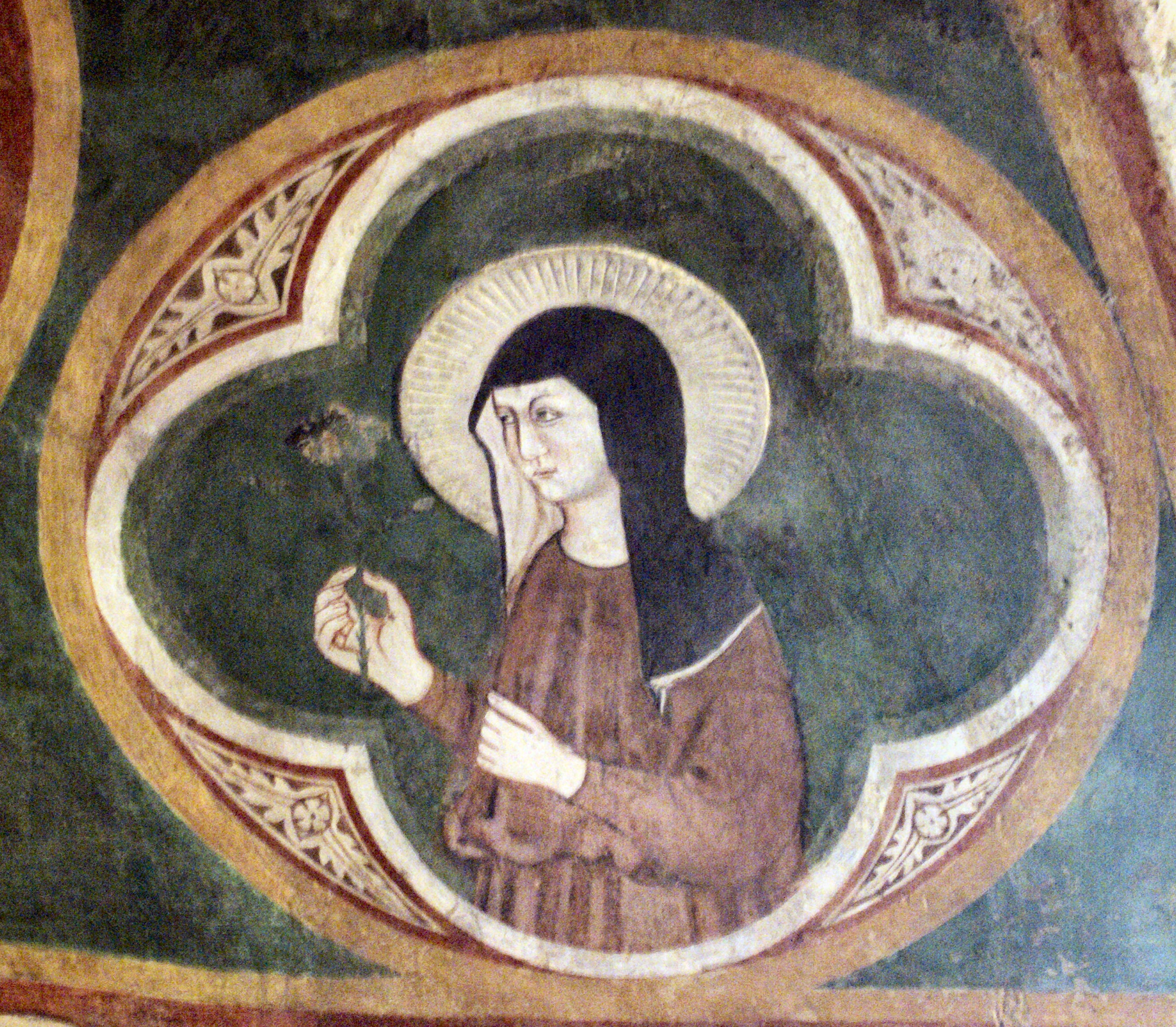
- Fresco in San Damiano

Virgin
- Born: Chiara Offreduccio; 16 July 1194; Assisi, Duchy of Spoleto, Holy Roman Empire
- Died: 11 August 1253 (aged 59); Assisi, Papal States
- Venerated in: Catholic Church; Anglican Communion; Lutheran Church
- Canonized: 26 September 1255, Rome by Pope Alexander IV
- Major shrine: Basilica of Saint Clare, Assisi
- Feast: 11 August
- Attributes: Monstrance, pyx, lamp, crozier, habit of the Poor Clares
- Patronage: Television, eye disease, goldsmiths, laundry, bicycle messengers, good weather, needleworkers, fertility, Santa Clara, California, Santa Clara Pueblo, New Mexico, Obando, Bulacan

Chiara Offreduccio (16 July 1194 – 11 August 1253), known as Clare of Assisi (sometimes spelled Clara, Clair or Claire; Italian: Chiara d'Assisi), is an Italian saint who was one of the first followers of Francis of Assisi.

Inspired by the teachings of St. Francis, St. Clare founded the Order of Poor Ladies, a monastic religious order for women in the Franciscan tradition. The Order of Poor Ladies was different from any other order or convent because it followed a rule of strict poverty. Clare wrote their Rule of Life, the first set of monastic guidelines known to have been written by a woman. Following her death, the order she founded was renamed in her honor as the Order of Saint Clare, commonly referred to today as the Poor Clares. Her feast day is on the 11th of August every year.

== Early life ==
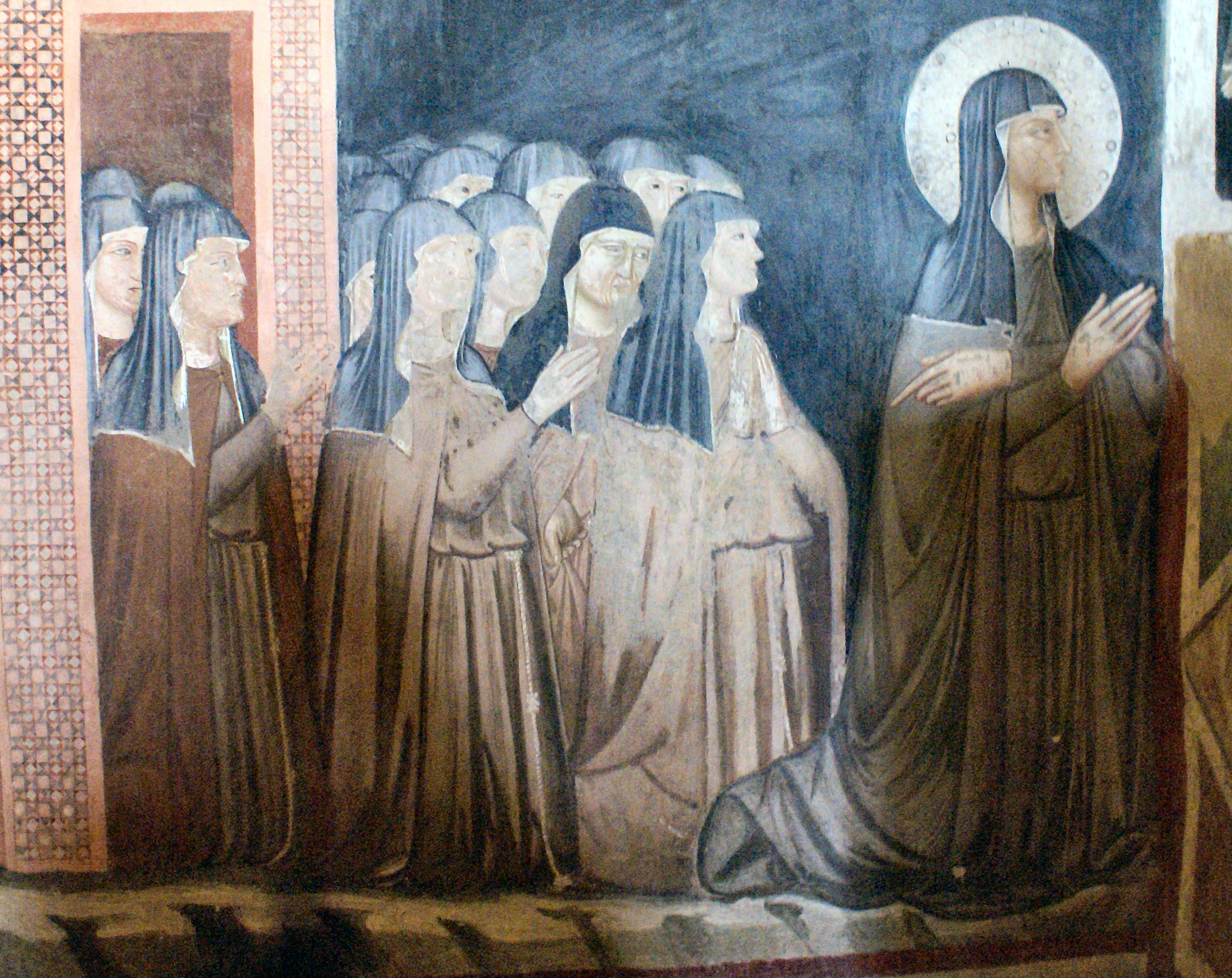
Fresco of Saint Clare and sisters of her order, church of San Damiano, Assisi

Clare was born in Assisi to the Offreduccio household during the High Middle Ages, the eldest daughter of Favarone or Favorino Sciffi, Count of Sasso-Rosso, and his wife Ortolana. Traditional accounts say that Clare's father was a wealthy representative of an ancient Roman family, who owned a large palace in Assisi and a castle on the slope of Mount Subasio. Ortolana belonged to the noble family of Fiumi, and was a very devout woman who had undertaken pilgrimages to Rome, Santiago de Compostela, and the Holy Land. Later in life, after being widowed, Ortolana entered Clare's monastery.

Clare's younger sisters, Beatrix and Catarina, followed her into religious life. (The latter took the name Agnes and became an early abbess in the order. She established it in additional communities, and was declared a saint herself in the mid-18th century.)

As children, Clare and her sisters were taught the ways of Christianity by their mother; they all became very religious and devoted to prayer. When Clare was 12 years old, her parents wanted her to marry a wealthy young man; however, she protested and said that she did not want to marry until she turned 18. As a teen, she heard Francis preach during a Lenten service in the church of San Giorgio at Assisi.

Inspired by his words and knowing that marriage was rapidly approaching, Clare went to Francis and asked him to help her to live after the manner of the Gospel. On the evening of Palm Sunday, 20 March 1212, with the consent of Guido II, bishop of Assisi, Clare left her father's house accompanied by her aunt Bianca and another companion, and proceeded to the chapel of the Porziuncula to meet Francis. There, her hair was cut, and she exchanged her rich gown for a plain robe and veil. Fully cutting a woman's hair was a symbolic act showing that she was no longer bound by the laws of man or society but rather that she followed the will of God.

== Life in the convent ==
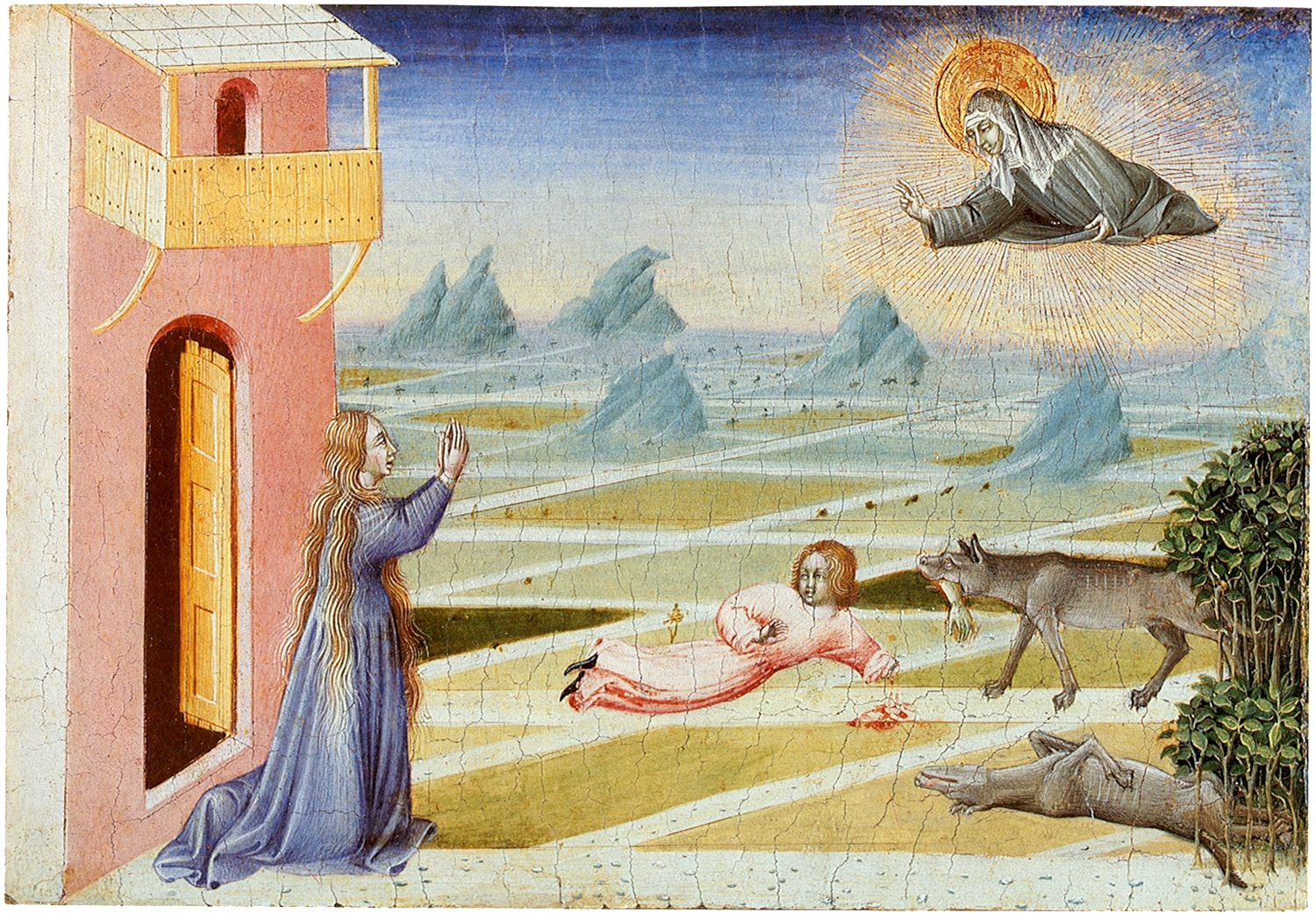
Saint Clare intervenes to save a child from a wolf; panel by Giovanni di Paolo, 1455.

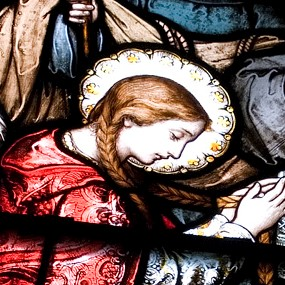
Saint Clare makes vows into the hands of Saint Francis. Stained glass window in the convent of the Holy family in Manitowoc, Wisconsin.

Francis placed Clare in the convent of the Benedictine nuns of San Paulo, near Bastia. Her father, along with other members of her family, attempted to convince her to return home. At first, they tried to persuade her by enticing her with wealth, and the privileges of nobility through marriage, but she resisted each attempt, professing that she would have no other husband but Jesus Christ.

Finally, when they tried to use force she clung to the altar of the church and threw aside her veil to show her cropped hair. It was only after seeing her cropped hair that her family relented and left her in peace. In order to provide the greater solitude Clare desired, a few days later Francis sent her to Sant'Angelo in Panzo, another monastery of the Benedictine nuns on one of the flanks of Subasio.

Her sister Catarina unexpectedly joined Clare 16 days later and took the name 'Agnes'. This caused a tremendous uproar in Clare's family as now two of their girls had refused marriage and left the family. Clare's uncle Monaldo, who was head of the family, came to Sant'Angelo with a group of men to bring Agnes back. He confronted Agnes forcefully while Clare was praying for her sister's safety. In the end, Monaldo left empty-handed as he and his men failed to force Agnes to return home.

The sisters remained with the Benedictines until a small dwelling was built for them next to the church of San Damiano, which Francis had repaired some years earlier. The dwelling was built hastily, as Francis and the Benedictines feared further conflict with Monaldo and other relatives of Clare and Agnes. Other women joined the sisters, and they became known as the "Poor Ladies of San Damiano". They lived a simple life of poverty, austerity, and seclusion from the world, according to a Rule which Francis gave them as a Second Order (Poor Clares).

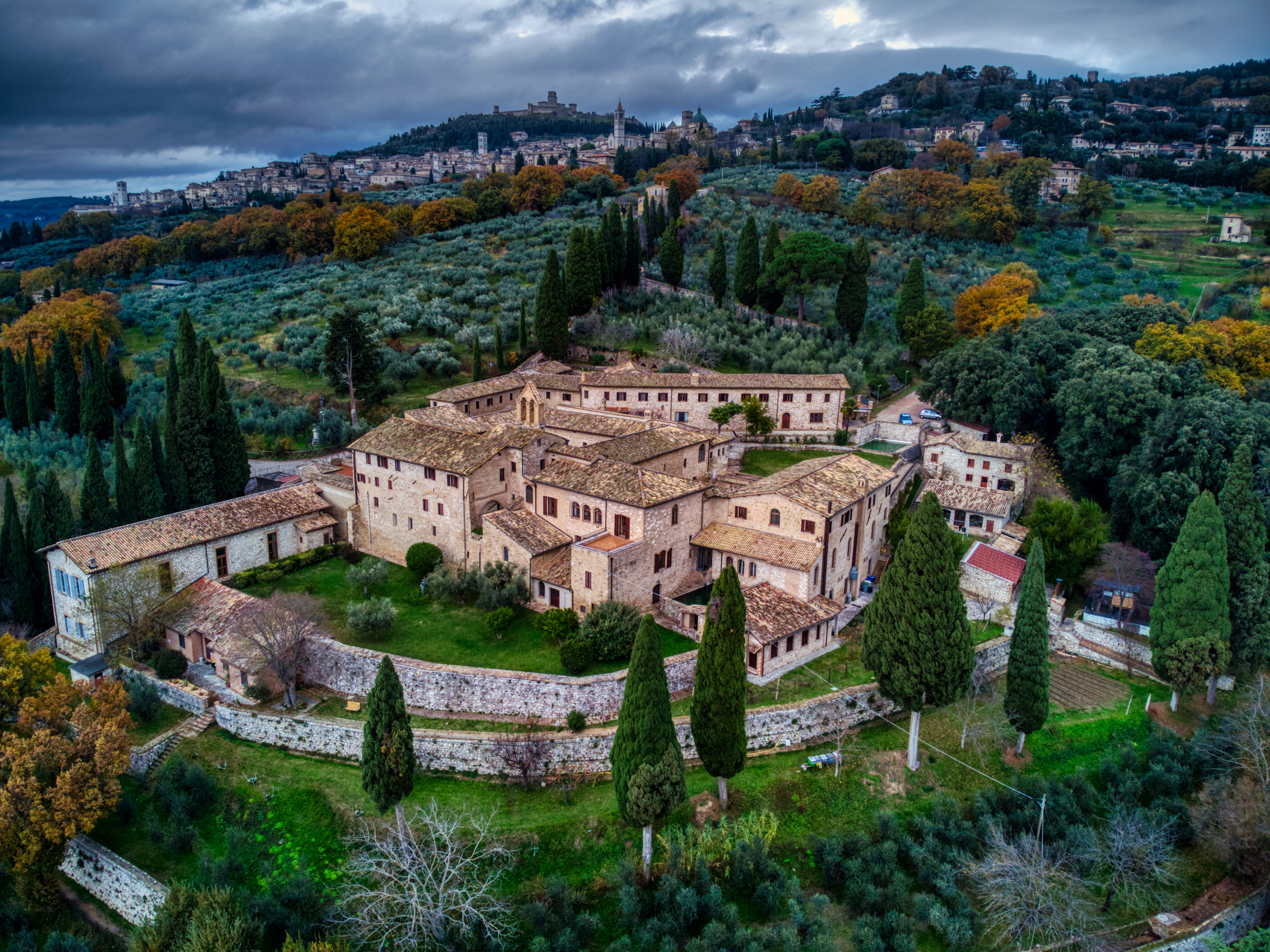
San Damiano

San Damiano became the centre of Clare's new religious order, which was known in her lifetime as the "Order of Poor Ladies of San Damiano". San Damiano is traditionally considered the first house of this order; it may have been affiliated with an existing network of women's religious houses organised by Hugolino (who later became Pope Gregory IX). Hugolino wanted San Damiano as part of the order he founded because of the prestige of Clare's monastery. San Damiano emerged as the most important house in the order, and Clare became its undisputed leader. By 1263, just ten years after Clare's death, the order had become known as the Order of Saint Clare.

Unlike the Franciscan friars, whose members moved around the country to preach, Clare's sisters lived in enclosure, since an itinerant life was hardly conceivable at the time for women. Their life consisted of manual labour and prayer. The nuns went barefoot, slept on the ground, ate no meat, and observed almost complete silence. This was in accordance with the strict teachings of poverty assigned to Clare by Francis. Francis and Clare believed that through poverty they could become closer to Jesus as they would live the way he did. They were not inconvenienced by this lifestyle, but rather they believed it was a blessing, as they were following in the footsteps of Jesus Christ.

For a short period, the order was directed by Francis himself. In 1216, however, Clare reluctantly accepted the role of abbess of San Damiano. As abbess, Clare had more authority to lead the order than when she was the prioress and required to follow the orders of a priest heading the community. Clare did not care for titles or power within the Order, and took on the role of abbess only on the instruction of Francis. Clare referred to herself by such terms as mother, handmaid, or servant rather than an abbess. She was very shy and did not like giving orders. On the rare occasions when she would give orders, she would do so with great humility and shyness. Clare would purposefully save the most tedious tasks for herself because she always wished to take care of her sisters. Clare sought to imitate Francis's virtues and way of life so much so that she was sometimes titled alter Franciscus, 'another Francis'. She also played a significant role in encouraging and aiding Francis, whom she saw as a spiritual father figure, and she took care of him during his final illness.

After Francis's death, Clare continued to promote the growth of her order, writing letters to abbesses in other parts of Europe, including Agnes of Prague, with whom she had formed a close friendship. However, with Francis gone, she faced another challenge.

The Fourth Lateran Council, in 1215, decreed that any new religious communities that had not yet been approved would have to adopt an established order. This established order was very similar to the Rule of Saint Benedict, which was the common rule that monasteries followed. Clare vigorously fought to keep her rule of strict poverty. Ultimately, when the other priests and bishops refused to accept her rule of strict poverty, she sought to get a special privilege from the pope. If granted, this special privilege of poverty ("Privilegium Paupertatis") from the pope would allow her order to keep living in strict poverty as they wanted. Although Innocent III had approved Clare's privilege and his successor Honorius III had no issue with it, Honorius III's successor Gregory IX did have a problem with Clare's lifestyle of strict poverty. Gregory IX was the Cardinal Huglino who had previously known and worked with Clare and her order at San Damiano.

During this time, he came to care for Clare and she became very dear to him. Gregory IX worried that the health of the sisters would suffer unduly under the strict vow of poverty Clare wanted. During a visit to San Damiano, Gregory IX urged Clare to give up her way of strict poverty, stating that "if you fear because of your vow, We dispense you from it", to which she immediately responded, "Holy Father, never and in no way do I wish to be dispensed from following Christ!" At that moment, the Pope had no more objections, and during his second year as Pope reapproved the Privilegium Paupertatis.

== Late life ==
Following the Order's approval from the Pope, Clare wanted to make a Rule based on Francis's teachings, which her sisters would be able to follow long after she died. Clare began writing her own Rule, keeping Francis's teachings at the forefront of her mind. Her Rule especially emphasized the absolute non-possession of property. She had her Rule approved by both Cardinal Rainaldo and Pope Innocent IV. Clare's Franciscan theology of joyous poverty in imitation of Christ is evident in the Rule she wrote for her community and in her four letters to Agnes of Prague.

As Holy Roman Emperor Frederick II battled Pope Gregory IX for control of Italy during the Crusades era, separately in September 1240 and June 1241, a pair of Saracen armies attacked the monastery of San Damiano and the town of Assisi. Both targets were successfully defended as Clare prayed to Christ, present in the Blessed Sacrament.

In her later years, Clare endured a long period of poor health. She died on 11 August 1253 at the age of 59, one day after having her Rule approved by Pope Innocent IV. Her last words are reported to have been, "Blessed be You, O God, for having created me."

== Death ==
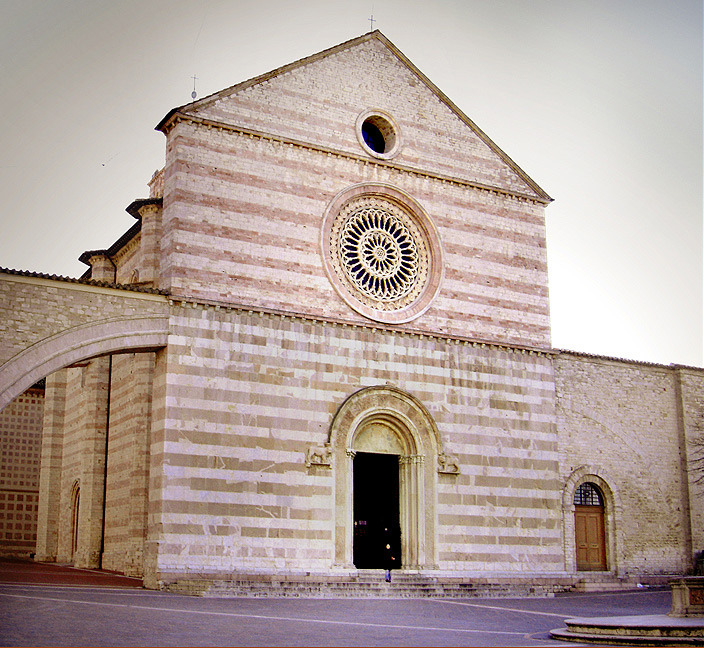
Basilica of Saint Clare, Assisi

On 9 August 1253 two days before her death, the papal bull Solet annuere of Pope Innocent IV confirmed that Clare's rule would serve as the governing rule for Clare's Order of Poor Ladies. Her remains were interred at the chapel of San Giorgio while a church to hold her remains was being constructed. At her funeral, Pope Innocent IV insisted the friars perform the Office for the Virgin Saints as opposed to the Office for the Dead. This move by Pope Innocent ensured that the canonization process for Clare would begin shortly after her funeral. Pope Innocent was cautioned by multiple advisers against having the Office for the Virgin Saints performed at Clare's funeral. The most vocal of these advisers was Cardinal Raynaldus, who would later become Pope Alexander IV and, in two years' time, would canonize Clare. At Pope Innocent's request the canonization process for Clare began immediately. While the whole process took two years, the examination of Clare's miracles took just six days. On 26 September 1255, Pope Alexander IV canonized Clare as Saint Clare of Assisi. Construction of the Basilica of Saint Clare was completed in 1260, and on 3 October of that year Clare's remains were transferred to the newly completed basilica where they were buried beneath the high altar. In further recognition of the saint, Pope Urban IV officially changed the name of the Order of Poor Ladies to the Order of Saint Clare in 1263.

On her deathbed, Clare was heard to say to herself, "Go forth in peace, for you have followed the good road. Go forth without fear, for He Who created you has made you holy, has always protected you, and loves you as a mother. Blessed be You, my God, for having created me."

Some 600 years later in 1872, Clare's relics were transferred to a newly constructed shrine in the crypt of the Basilica of Saint Clare, where her relics can still be venerated today.

== Legacy ==
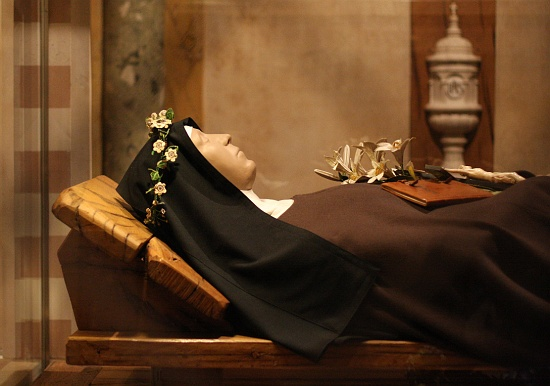
The wax figure of Saint Clare of Assisi at the Basilica of Saint Clare, in Assisi

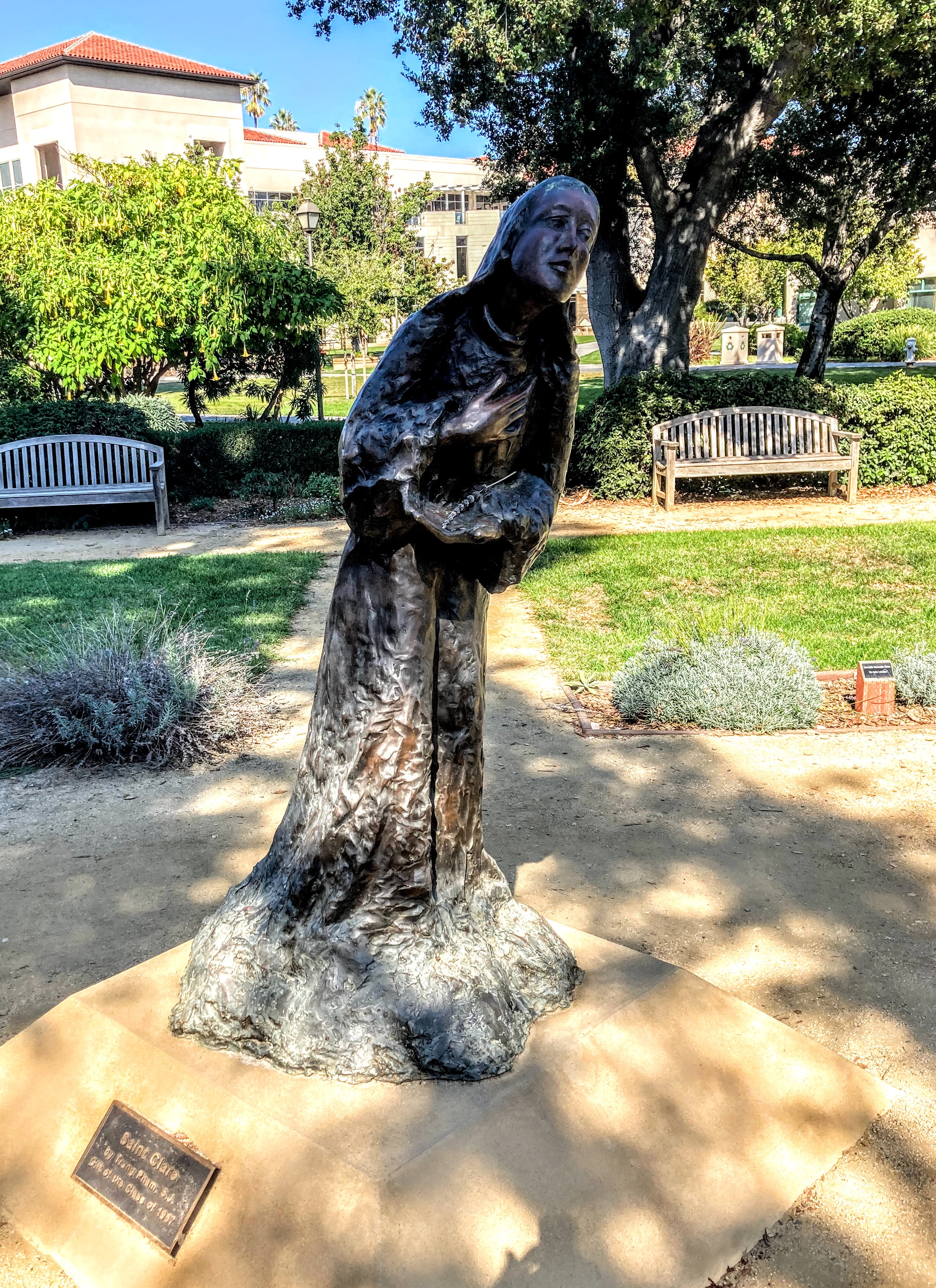
Statue of Saint Clare on the campus of Santa Clara University (2022)

Clare was canonized on 26 September 1255 by Pope Alexander IV, and her feast day was immediately inserted in the General Roman Calendar for celebration on 12 August, the day after her death, as 11 August was already assigned to Saints Tiburtius and Susanna, two 3rd-century Roman martyrs. The celebration was ranked as a Double (as in the Tridentine calendar) or, in the terminology of 1960, a Third-Class Feast (as in the General Roman Calendar of 1960). The 1969 calendar revision deleted the feast of Saints Tiburtius and Susanna from the calendar, and moved the memorial of Saint Clare to be celebrated on 11 August, the anniversary of her death.

Construction of the Basilica di Santa Chiara began a year after Clare's canonization, and her relics were translated there on 3 October 1260 from the Church of Saint George, also in Assisi. Her bones are enshrined in the basilica crypt, having been rediscovered in 1850.

In art, Clare is often shown carrying a monstrance or pyx, in commemoration of when she drove away the invading troops of Frederick II from her convent by exposing the Blessed Sacrament and kneeling in prayer.

Pope Pius XII designated Clare as the patroness saint of television in 1958, on the basis that when one Christmas night she was too ill to attend Midnight Mass, Clare reportedly had been able to hear the liturgical chants and see the crib as if she were present in the church.

There are traditions of offering chicken eggs to the Poor Clares so they may pray for good weather, especially for weddings. This tradition has remained popular in the Philippines, particularly at the Real Monasterio de Santa Clara in Quezon City, and Obando, Bulacan. According to the Filipino essayist Alejandro Roces, the practice arose because of a similarity to Clare's name: the Castilian clara refers to an interval of clear weather, and egg white (albumen).

Many places, including churches, convents, schools, hospitals, towns, and counties, are named for Saint Clare, Santa Clara, or other variants. Lake Saint Clair, between Lake Erie and Lake Huron, was navigated and named on her feast day in 1679. The Saint Clair River, St. Clair Shores, Michigan, and St. Clair County, Michigan were also consequently named for her.

Mission Santa Clara, founded by Spanish missionaries in Northern California in 1777, has given its name to the university, city, county, and Santa Clara Valley, the valley in which it sits, the latter of which has been famously nicknamed "Silicon Valley" since the 1970s.

Some 260 miles (420 km) to the southeast of Santa Clara Valley, Southern California's Santa Clara River gave its name to the nearby city of Santa Clarita.

The early California missions were founded by Franciscan Friars, who had a special devotion to Saint Clare.

Santa Clara Pueblo, New Mexico, celebrates its Santa Clara Feast Day annually on 12 August, as the feast was celebrated before the 1969 calendar change.

The first convent in Cuba, Convento de Santa Clara de Asis, was dedicated to Saint Clare, as well as her namesake city and its cathedral, Catedral de Santa Clara de Asís.

Columbus's ship known as Niña, which visited Cuba twice, was officially named Santa Clara.

Clare is one of five characters in the oratorio Laudato si', composed in 2016 by Peter Reulein on a libretto by Helmut Schlegel, the others being an angel, Mary, Francis of Assisi, and Pope Francis.

Clare of Assisi is remembered in the Church of England and other churches of the Anglican Communion with a Lesser Festival on 11 August.

She was played by Dolores Hart - who later became a nun herself - in the 1961 film Francis of Assisi.

== In art ==
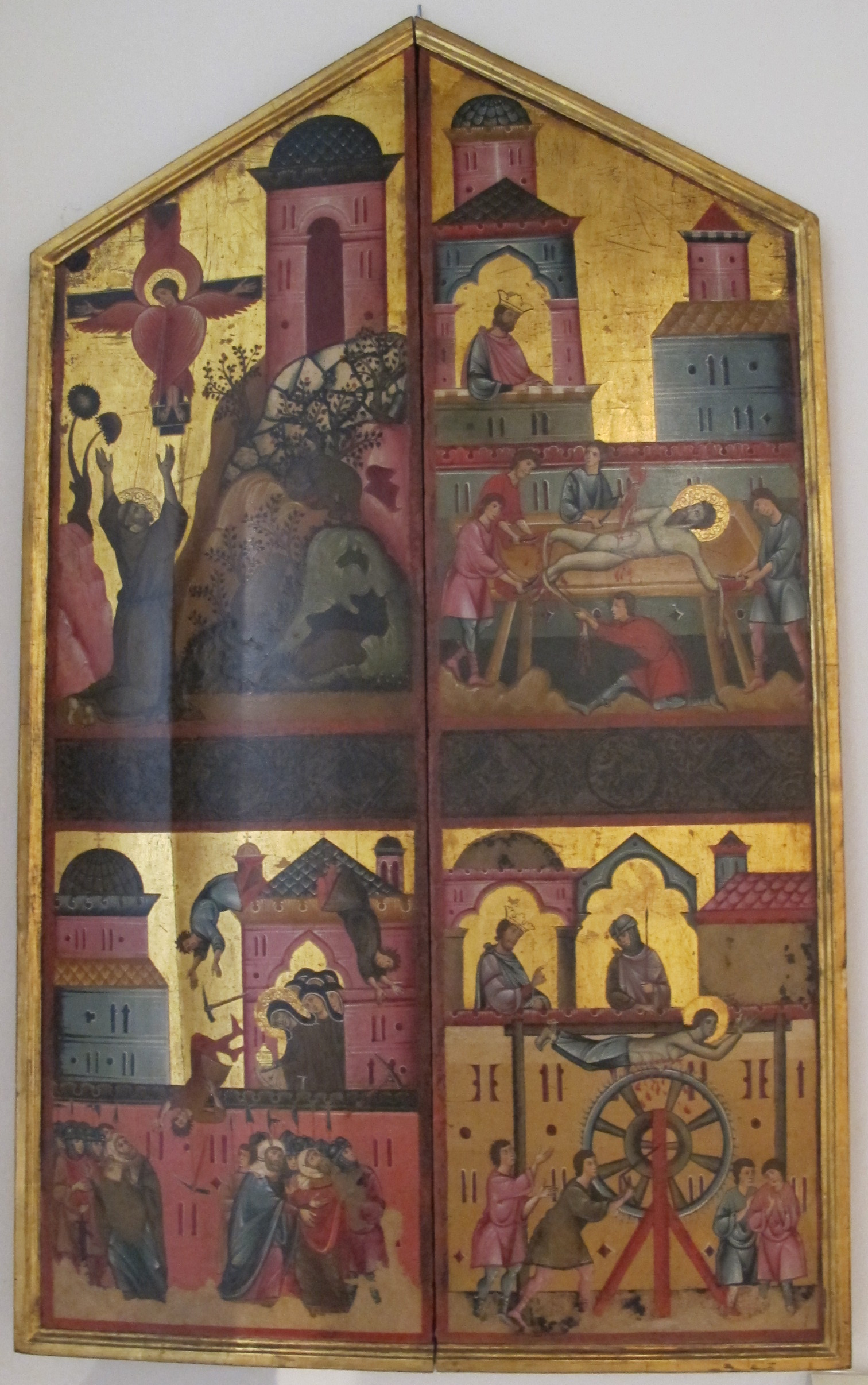
Guido da Siena, Diptych of St. Clare (1260)

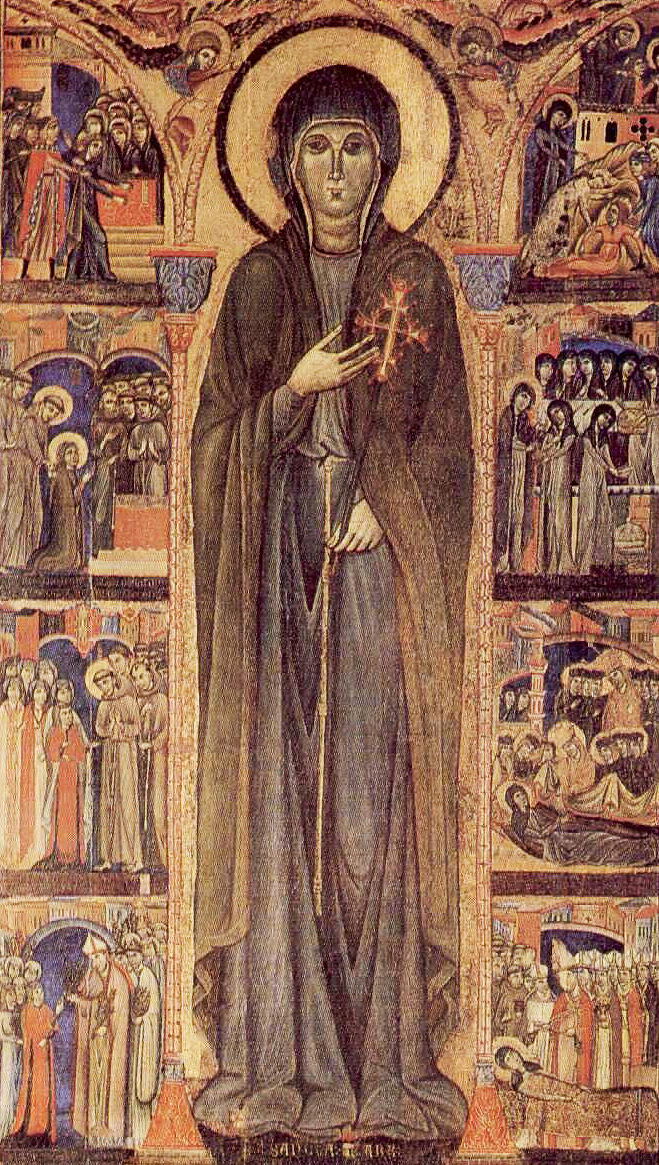
Master of Saint Clare, Saint Clare altarpiece (1283)

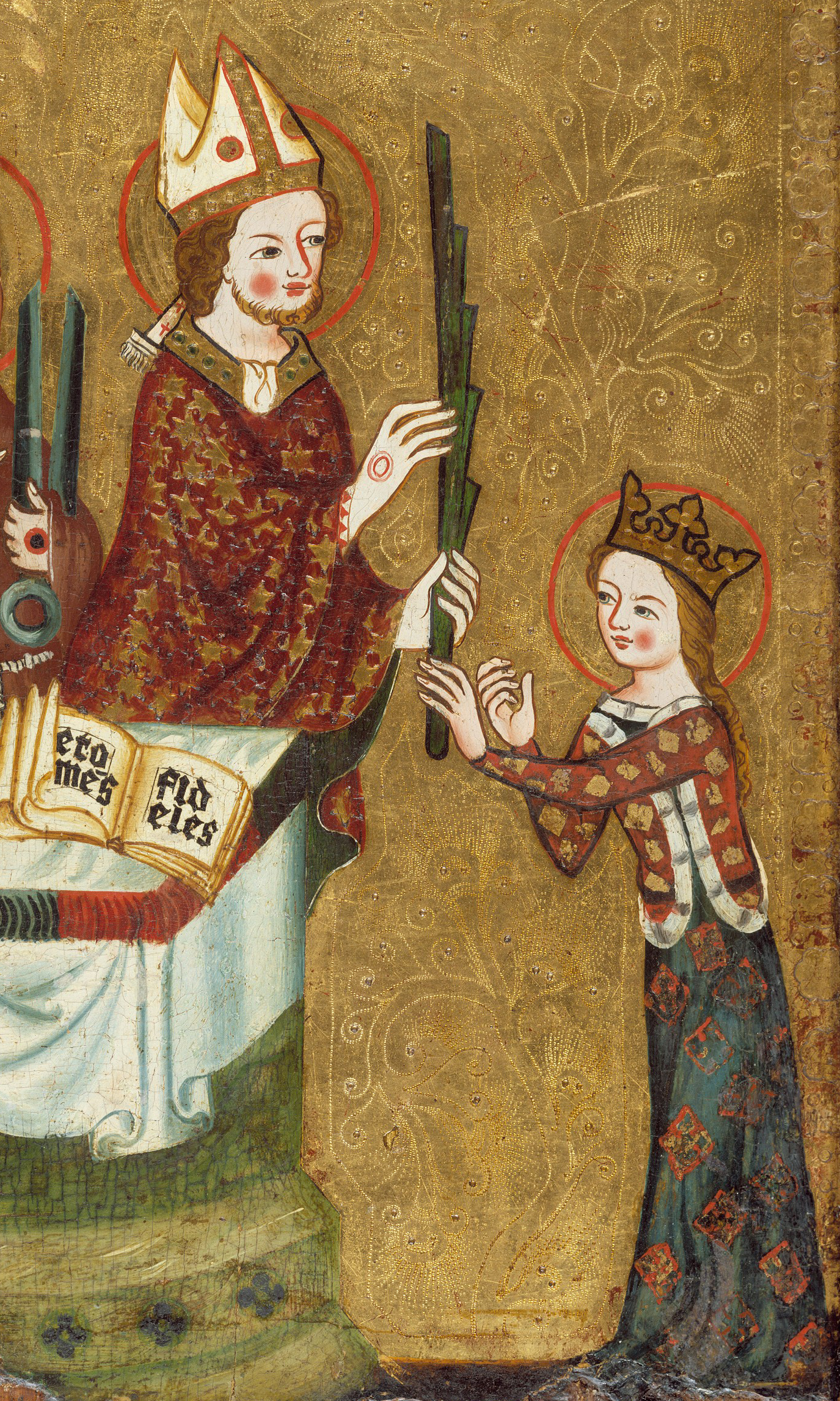
The bishop of Assisi giving a palm to Saint Clare (1360)

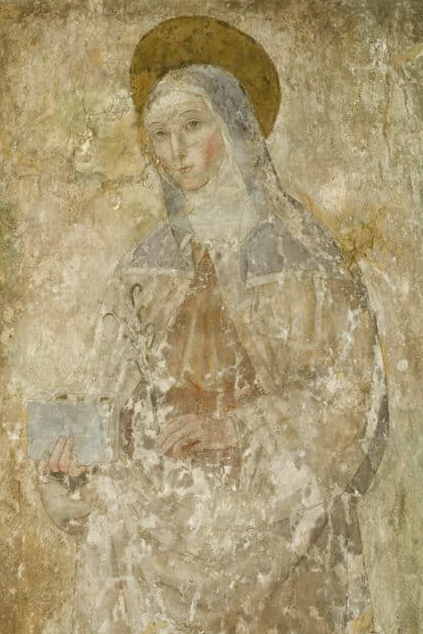
Tiberio of Assisi, Saint Clare of Assisi (early 16th c)

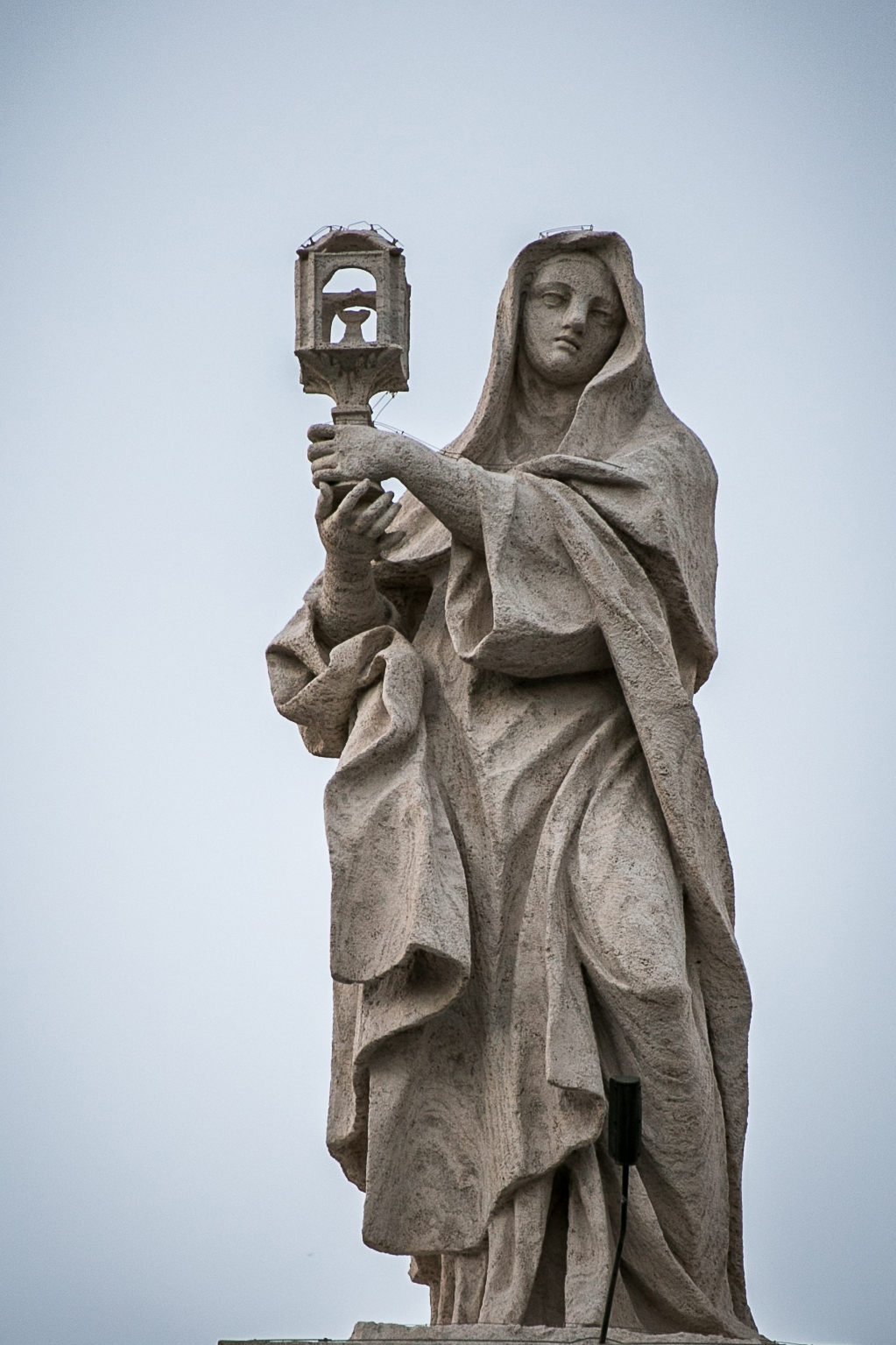
Gian Lorenzo Bernini and Lazzaro Morelli, St. Clare (1667–1668)

== See also ==
- Saint Clare of Assisi, patron saint archive
