= Sinclaire =

Sinclaire is a surname. Notable people with the name include:

- Breanna Sinclairé (born c. 1991), American transgender singer
- Bratt Sinclaire, Italian Eurobeat/Italo disco producer
- Frederick Sinclaire (1881–1954), New Zealand Unitarian minister, pacifist, social critic, university professor and essayist
- Nikki Sinclaire (born 1968), British politician
- Stephanie Sinclaire (born 1954), also known as Stephanie Crawford, is a painter and director in theatre and film
- William Sinclaire, American polo player

== See also ==
- Elexis Sinclaire, a fictional character in the SiN first-person shooter video game series by Ritual Entertainment
- Sinclair
