= Sinclair =

Sinclair may refer to:

== Places ==
- Lake Sinclair, near Milledgeville, Georgia
- Mount Sinclair, Canada
- Sinclair, Iowa
- Sinclair, Maine
- Sinclair, West Virginia
- Sinclair, Wyoming
- Sinclair Mills, British Columbia
- Sinclair Township, Minnesota
- Sinclair, Manitoba
- Sinclair, Western Australia, a locality of the Shire of Esperance

== People ==
- Sinclair (surname), list of people with the surname
- Clan Sinclair, Scottish family
- Lord Sinclair, a title in the Peerage of Scotland
- Sinclair Armstrong, Irish professional footballer
- Sinclair Lewis (1885–1951), Nobel Prize–winning American writer
- Sinclair (singer), stage name of French singer-songwriter Mathieu Blanc-Francard (born 1970)
- Sir Clive Sinclair (1940–2021), English entrepreneur and inventor known for his work in consumer electronics

== Companies ==
- Sinclair Broadcast Group, operator of American television stations
- Sinclair Oil Corporation, American petroleum company
- Sinclair Radionics Ltd, British electronics company founded in 1961
- Sinclair Research Ltd, British consumer electronics company founded in 1973, and the successor to Sinclair Radionics
- Sinclair Telecable, American radio broadcasting company
- Timex Sinclair, a joint venture between the British company Sinclair Research and Timex Corporation

== Schools ==
- Sinclair (high school), Uddevalla, Sweden
- Sinclair Community College, Dayton, Ohio, U.S.
- Sinclair Secondary School, Ontario, Canada

== Highways ==
- Sinclair Freeway (Interstate 680)

== Transportation ==
- USS Sinclair (DD-275), a United States Navy destroyer named for Captain Arthur Sinclair
- Sinclair C5, a one-person battery electric velomobile

== Fictional characters ==
- Augustus Sinclair, a character in the 2010 video game BioShock 2
- Jeffrey Sinclair, a character from US TV series Babylon 5
- Lord Brett Sinclair, a character from the 1971 TV series The Persuaders!
- Synclaire James, a character in the 1993 Fox network sitcom Living Single
- Rahne Sinclair (Wolfsbane), a mutant superhero from Marvel Comics
- Helga Sinclair, a character in the 2001 Disney animated sci-fi movie Atlantis: The Lost Empire
- Skylar Sinclair, a character in the 2009 video game The Saboteur
- Lucas Sinclair, a character in the 2016 Netflix series Stranger Things
- Ryan Sinclair, a companion in series 11 and 12 of BBC series Doctor Who
- the Sinclair family, protagonists in ABC's Dinosaurs (TV series)
- Enid Sinclair, a character in the 2022 Netflix series Wednesday
- Emil Sinclair, protagonist in the 1919 novel Demian
- Emil Sinclair, a character in the 2023 video game Limbus Company
- Victor, Trudy, Vincent, Bo and Lester Sinclair, characters from the 2005 film House of Wax (2005 film)
- Trina Sinclair, a character from the 2000 film Ginger Snaps (film)
- Paige Sinclair, a character in the 2014 animated series BoJack Horseman
- The magnificent Sinclair, a character from the upcoming video game Deadlock (video game)

== See also ==
- Saint Clair (disambiguation)
- Saint Clare (disambiguation)
- Santa Clara (disambiguation)
- Bob Sinclar (born 1969), French record producer and DJ
- Sinclaire
- Sinckler (surname)
