= West St. Clair Township, Pennsylvania =

Township in Pennsylvania, US

Coordinates: 40.1768°N 78.6498°W

- Township
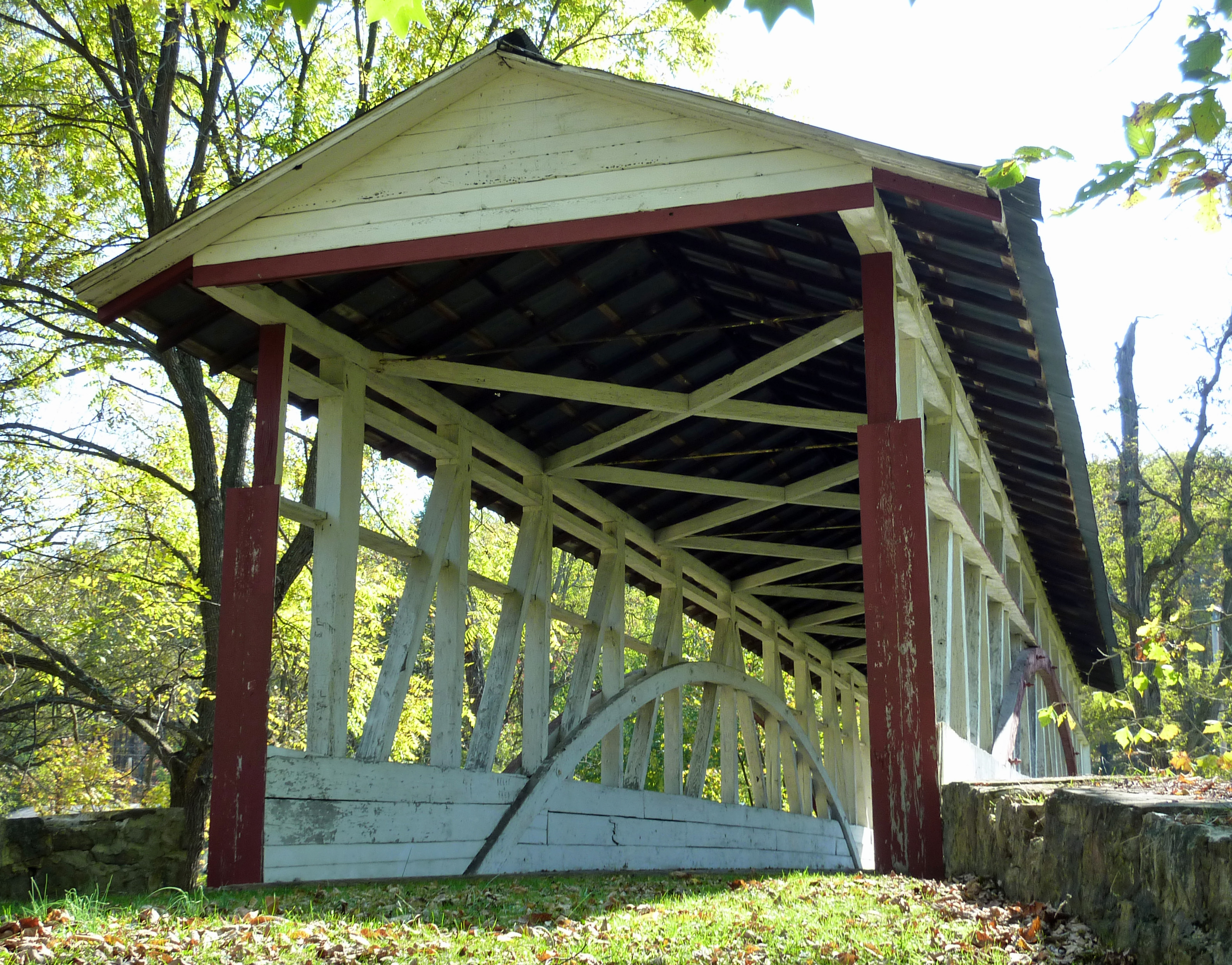
- Dr. Knisley Covered Bridge

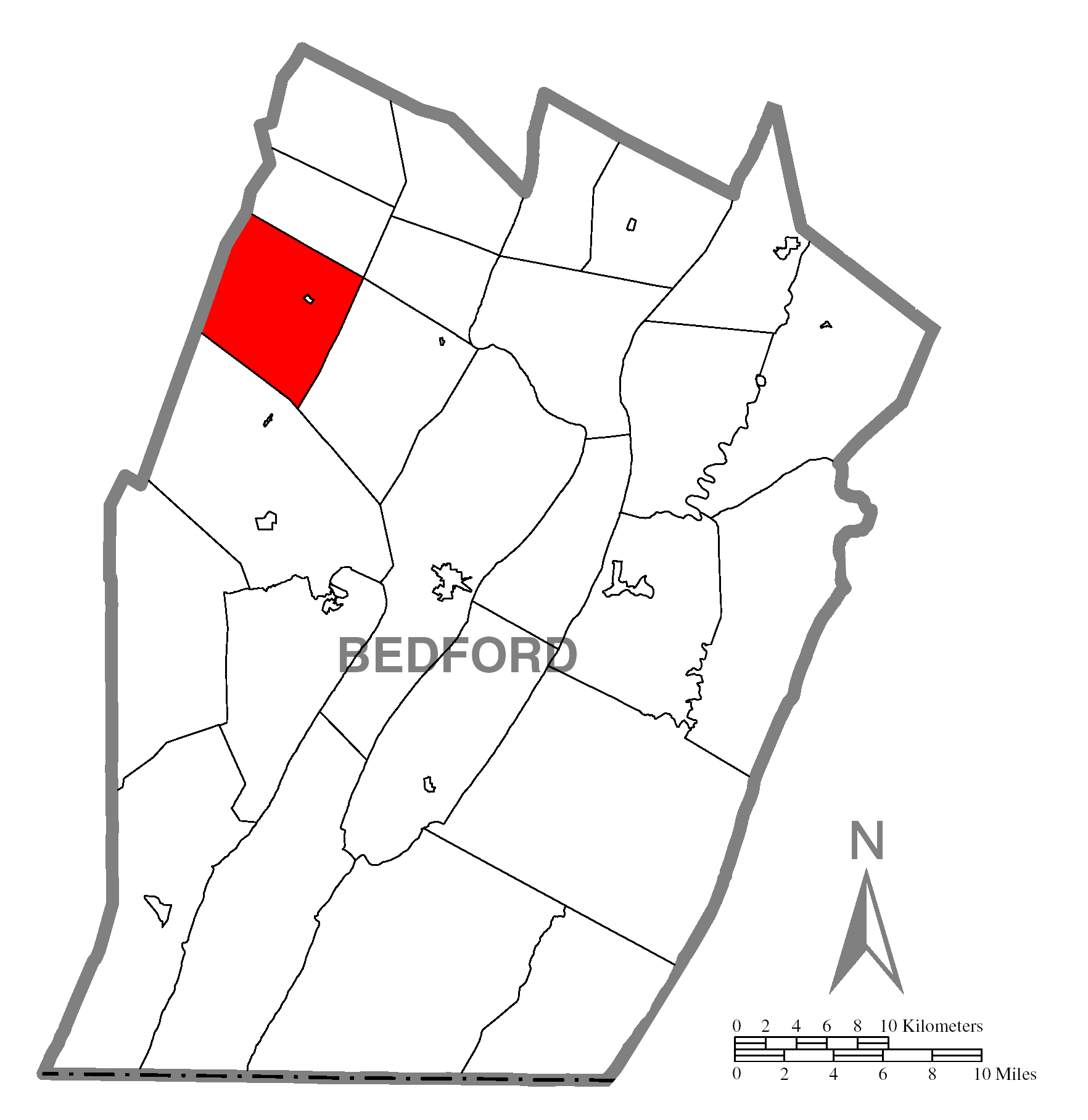
- Map of Bedford County, Pennsylvania highlighting West St. Clair Township

- Map of Bedford County, Pennsylvania
- Country: United States
- State: Pennsylvania
- County: Bedford
- Settled: 1782
- Incorporated: 1875

Area
  - Total: 29.85 sq mi (77.31 km^{2})
  - Land: 29.85 sq mi (77.30 km^{2})
  - Water: 0.0039 sq mi (0.01 km^{2})

Population (2020)
  - Total: 1,647 ▼
  - Estimate (2023): 1,646
  - Density: 57.1/sq mi (22.06/km^{2})
- Time zone: UTC-5 (Eastern (EST))
  - Summer (DST): UTC-4 (EDT)
- Area code: 814
- FIPS code: 42-009-83972
- Website: West St. Clair Township

West St. Clair Township is a township that is located in Bedford County, Pennsylvania, United States. The population was 1,647 at the time of the 2020 census.

== History ==
The Dr. Knisley Covered Bridge and Ryot Covered Bridge were listed on the National Register of Historic Places in 1980.

== Geography ==
West St. Clair Township is located in northwestern Bedford County and is bordered to the west by Somerset County. The borough of Pleasantville (or "Alum Bank") is surrounded by the township but is separate from it.

According to the United States Census Bureau, the township has a total area of 29.8 square miles (77.3 km^{2}), all land.

== Demographics ==
Historical population
Census	Pop.	Note	%±
2010	1,730		—
2020	1,647		−4.8%
2023 (est.)	1,646		−0.1%
U.S. Decennial Census

As of the census of 2000, there were 1,647 people, 594 households, and 472 families residing in the township.

The population density was 55.0 inhabitants per square mile (21.2/km^{2}). There were 681 housing units at an average density of 22.7/sq mi (8.8/km^{2}).

The racial makeup of the township was 98.12% White, 0.12% Native American, 0.18% Asian, 0.67% from other races, and 0.91% from two or more races. Hispanic or Latino of any race were 1.03% of the population.

There were 594 households, out of which 37.0% had children who were under the age of eighteen living with them, 69.5% were married couples living together, 6.6% had a female householder with no husband present, and 20.5% were non-families. Out of all of the households that were documented, 18.4% were made up of individuals, and 8.9% had someone living alone who was sixty-five years of age or older.

The average household size was 2.77 and the average family size was 3.14.

Within the township, the population was spread out, with 28.0% of residents who were under the age of 18, 7.2% from 18 to 24, 29.5% from 25 to 44, 22.1% from 45 to 64, and 13.2% who were 65 years of age or older. The median age was 36 years.

For every one hundred females, there were 100.1 males. For every one hundred females who were aged eighteen or older, there were 97.3 males.

The median income for a household in the township was $32,222, and the median income for a family was $33,750. Males had a median income of $27,792 compared with that of $17,644 for females.

The per capita income for the township was $13,440.

Approximately 14.0% of families and 15.7% of the population were living below the poverty line, including 22.8% of those who were under the age of eighteen and 13.7% of those who were aged sixty-five or older.
