= Monastery Saint Claire (Nazareth) =

Coordinates: 32°41′45″N 35°17′41″E

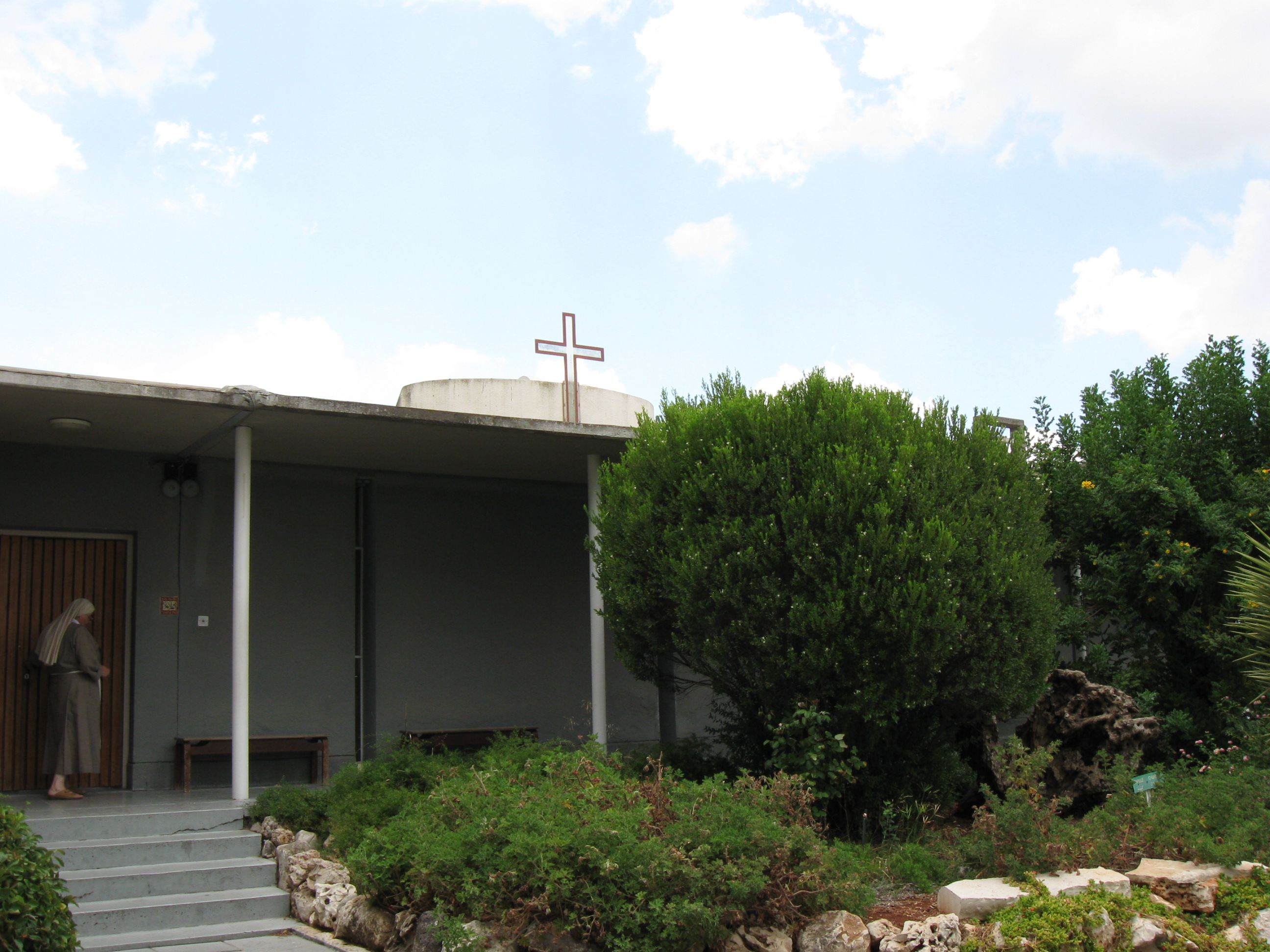
The exterior of the chapel of the Sisters of St Clare in present-day Nazareth

The Monastery Saint Claire (French: Monastère Sainte-Claire; Hebrew: נזירות סנט קליר, Nazirot Sanat Qlīr; Arabic: راهبات القدیصة کلارا, Rāhibāt al-Qudīṣah Klārā), also known as the Convent of Mary's Fear and by other names, is a convent of the Poor Clares on Tremor Hill in southern Nazareth, Israel. Established in 1884, it is primarily known for the productive time the now-sainted Charles de Foucauld spent there at the end of the 19th century. Expelled from the Ottoman Empire at the onset of World War I, the nuns of the abbey relocated to Malta, founding a new community there. The Sisters of St Clare returned to Nazareth in 1949 but used newer facilities on 3105 Street on the north slope of Tremor Hill. Their former location beside what is now Paulus HaShishi (Pope Paul VI) Street was repaired by the Servants of Charity for use as a special needs school in the 1970s.

== Names ==
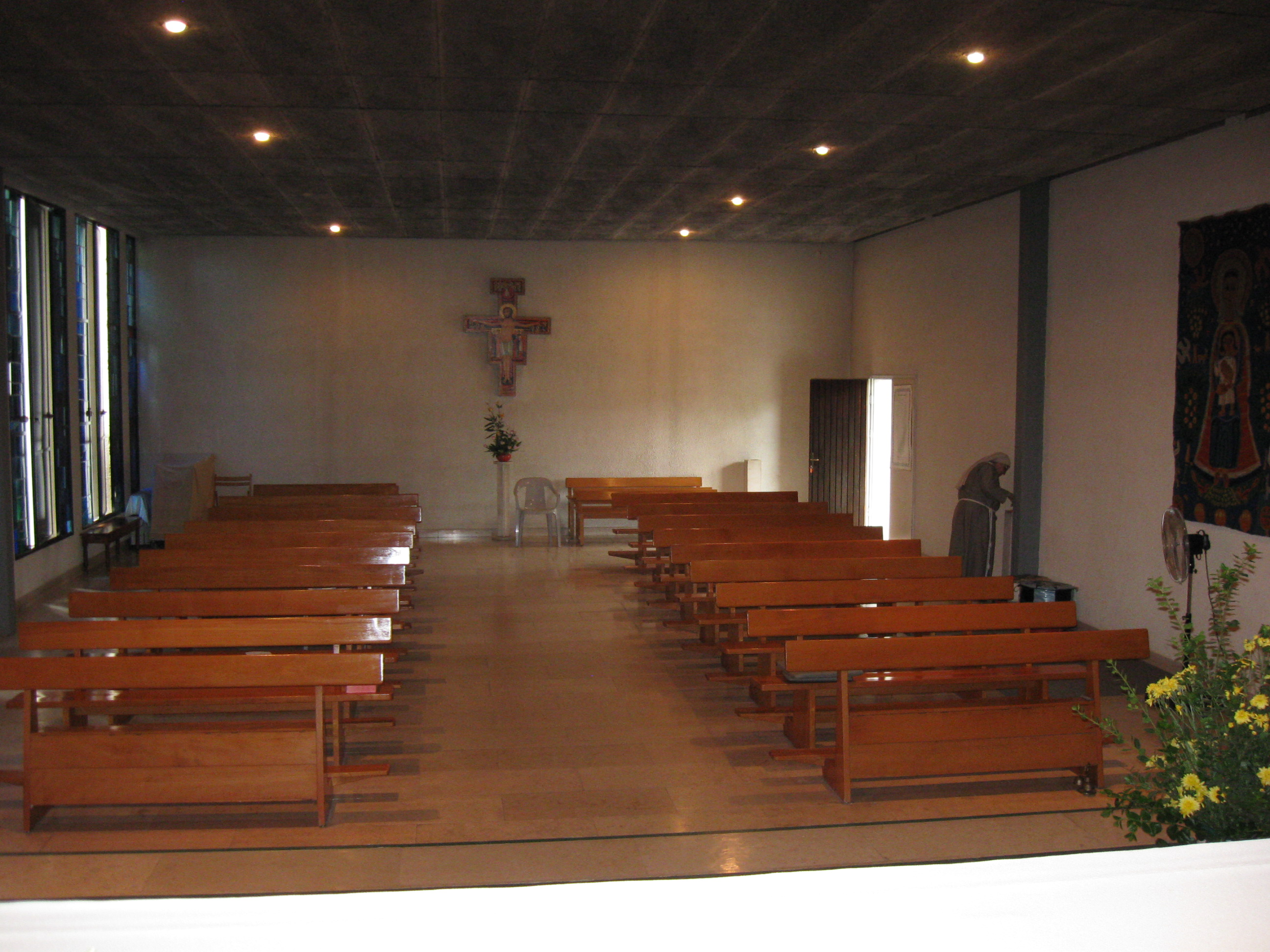
The interior of the chapel

From its position on Tremor Hill (Hebrew: גבעת הרעידה, Givʿat HaRʿida), the monastery is sometimes known as the Convent of Mary's Fear. Formally known to the Vatican as the Monastery Saint Claire (French: Monastère Sainte-Claire; Italian: Monastero S. Chiara), it is also variously referenced in formal and informal sources as the Monastery of St. Clare of Nazareth (Monastère de Ste Claire de Nazareth), the Clarissan Monastery (Monastère des Clarisses; Monastero delle Clarisse di Nazaret), Poor Clare's or Poor Claire's Convent, and the Chapel of Poor Clares.

== Legends ==
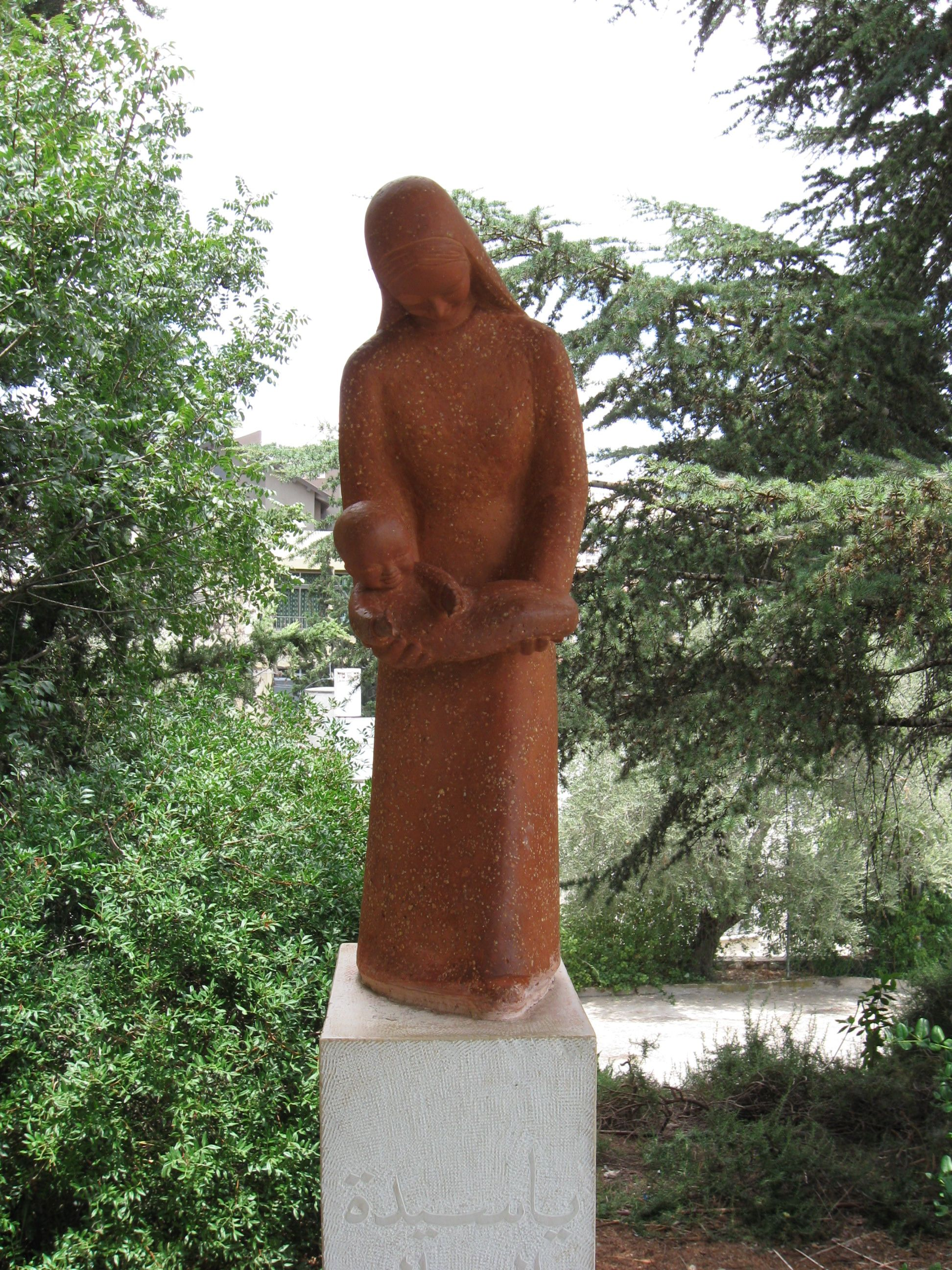
The Madonna and Child statue at the convent

Christian legend considered the nearby Mount Qedumim ("Mount Precipice") to have been the site of one of Jesus's rejections by the Jewish community of his time. After he expounded on Isaiah, the Jews of Nazareth supposedly took him to the steep cliff to throw him off when he disappeared from within their midst. In local folklore related to the story, the mob was said to have returned to Nazareth from the mountain and passed near the terrified Mary, who was miraculously sheltered from their view by a rock which took her shape. This rock was exhibited to pilgrims during the Crusader period. The site was thereafter known as Tremor Hill.

The Visitation of Elizabeth by Mary is usually associated with locations closer to Jerusalem such as Ein Karem and Hebron but were sometimes placed on this same hill during the Middle Ages. Elizabeth's husband Zechariah was a priest. The accounts of his service in the New Testament are usually placed at Herod's Temple in Jerusalem but a Byzantine chapel on or near Tremor Hill claimed that he had performed his office in a synagogue at Nazareth and exhibited an altar supposed to be the place where he had been visited by the archangel Gabriel. 13th century sources differ, though, as to whether it was run by the Greeks or Armenians.

== History ==
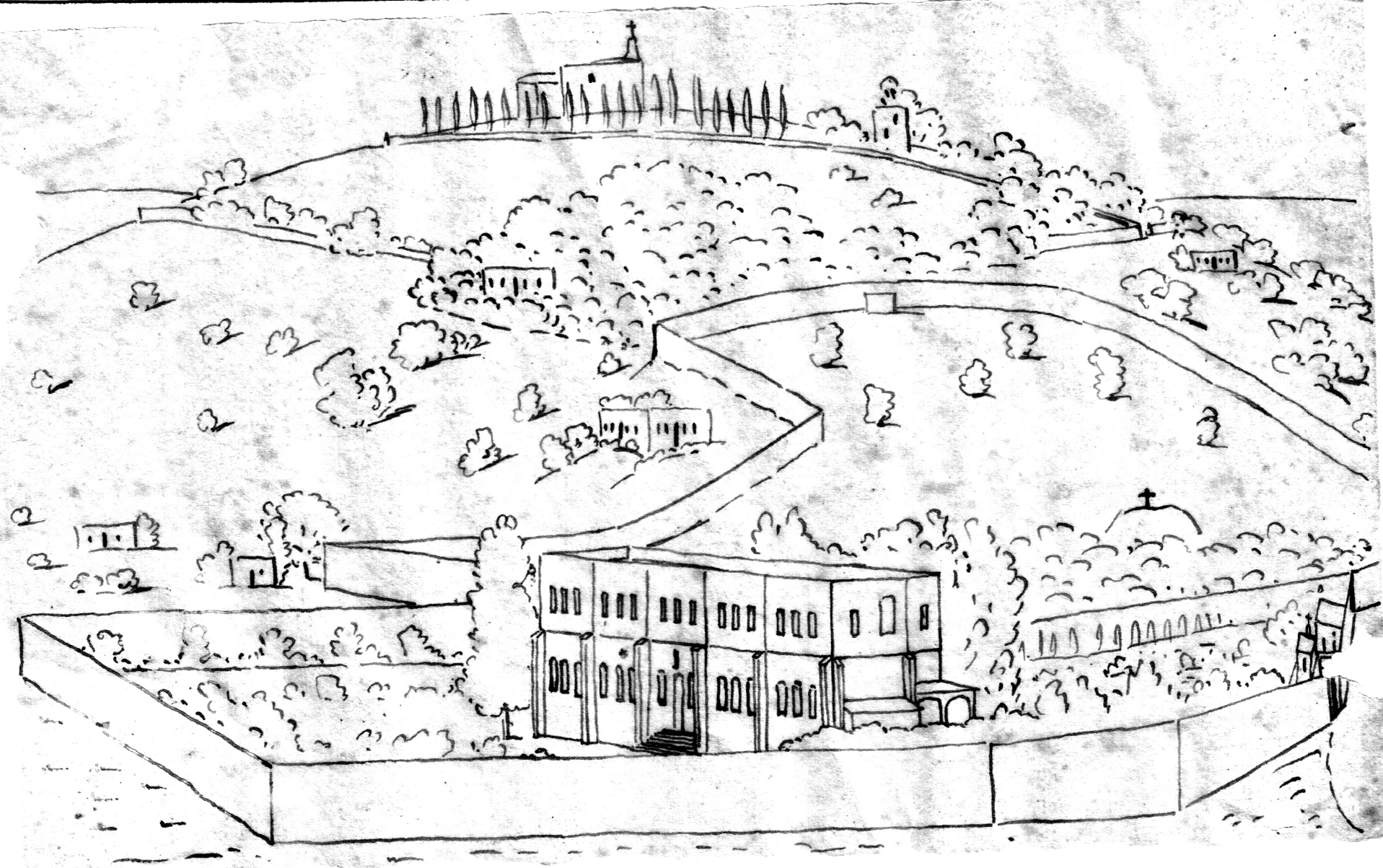
A sketch of the original convent—now the Holy Family School—by St Charles de Foucauld, showing the empty grounds used for the present-day convent and the ruined chapel of Our Lady of the Fright atop Tremor Hill behind it

Catholic holdings in Ottoman Palestine had been limited from 1551 until their establishment as a millet in 1831. The Latin Patriarchate of Jerusalem was reestablished in 1847, and French involvement in support of the Ottoman Empire in the Crimean War in the 1850s further improved relations. During this period, the French Empire frequently supported related Catholic institutions abroad as a way of expanding its local influence. The Nazarene convent of the Order of Saint Clare was first established by a group of 16 nuns from the Clarissan community at Paray-le-Monial, France, in 1884, four years before its sister convent in Jerusalem. Its first abbess was Elizabeth of Calvary (French: Élisabeth du Calvaire, Italian: Elisabetta del Calvario).

St Charles de Foucauld worked at the convent from 1897, living in a small wooden lean-to separate from the nuns' dormitory and previously used only for spare lumber storage. Hearing of "a servant who dressed like a tramp, spoke and wrote as a man of learning, and prayed like a saint", Elizabeth of Calvary—now the abbess of the Jerusalem convent—had him visit in 1888 and thereafter he divided his time between the two communities before returning to France in 1900. It was during this period in Nazareth that De Foucauld studied for the priesthood and produced most of his spiritual writings. There is now a small museum on the grounds of the monastery to accommodate interested pilgrims, housing some of the artifacts from his time at the convent.

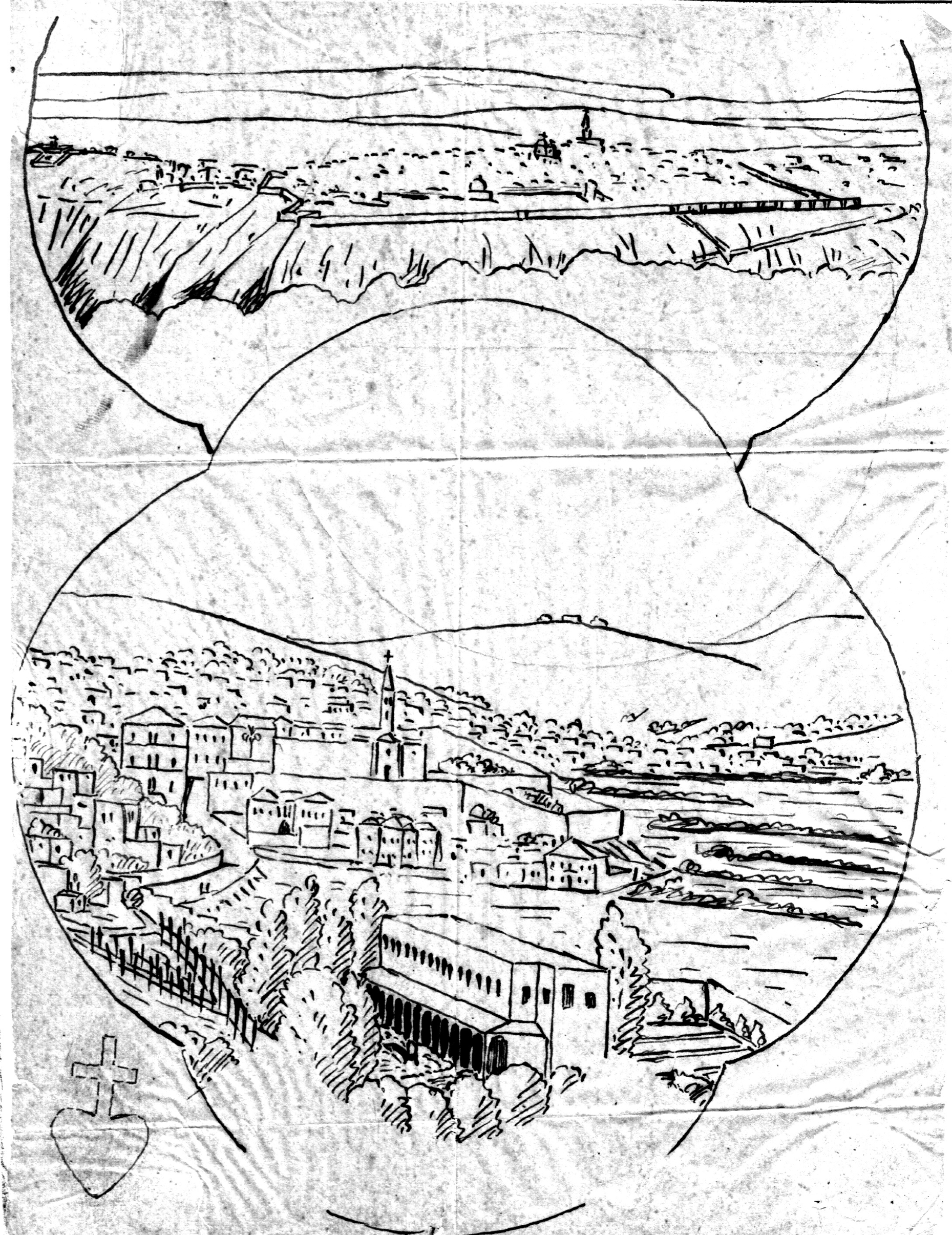
Another sketch of the original convent by St Charles

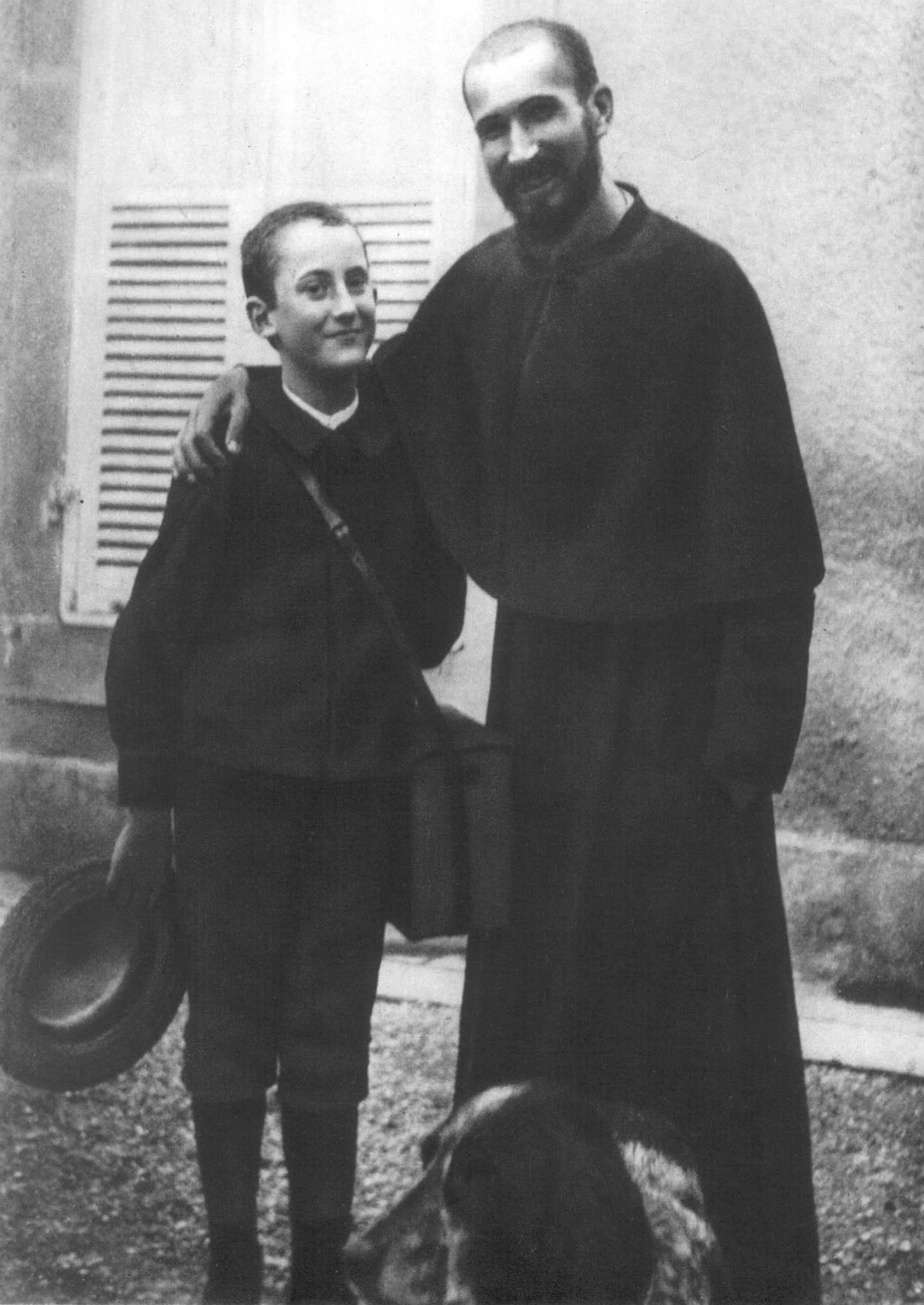
St Charles just after returning to Europe in 1900

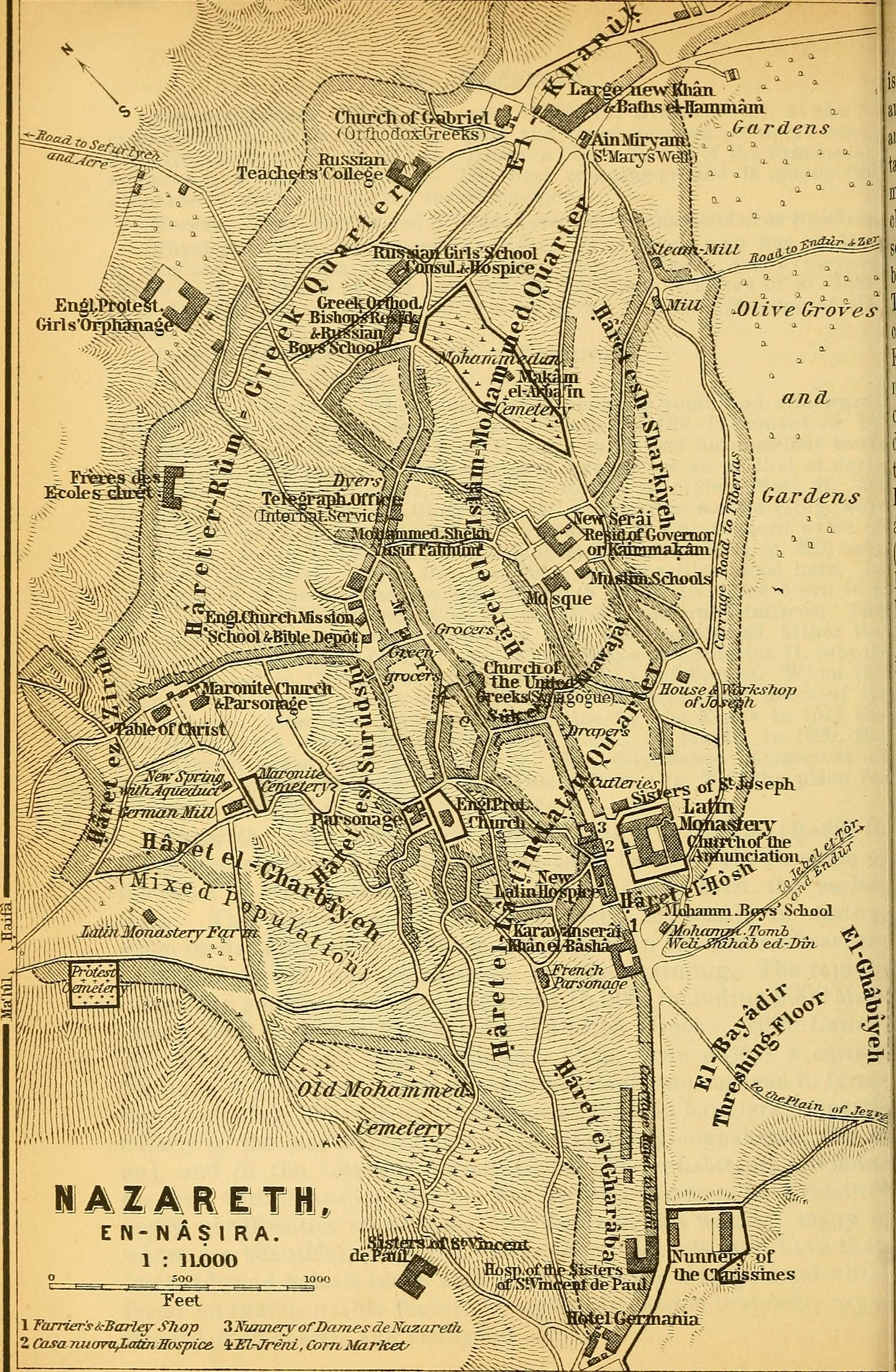
A 1906 map of Nazareth showing the original Nunnery of the Clarissines

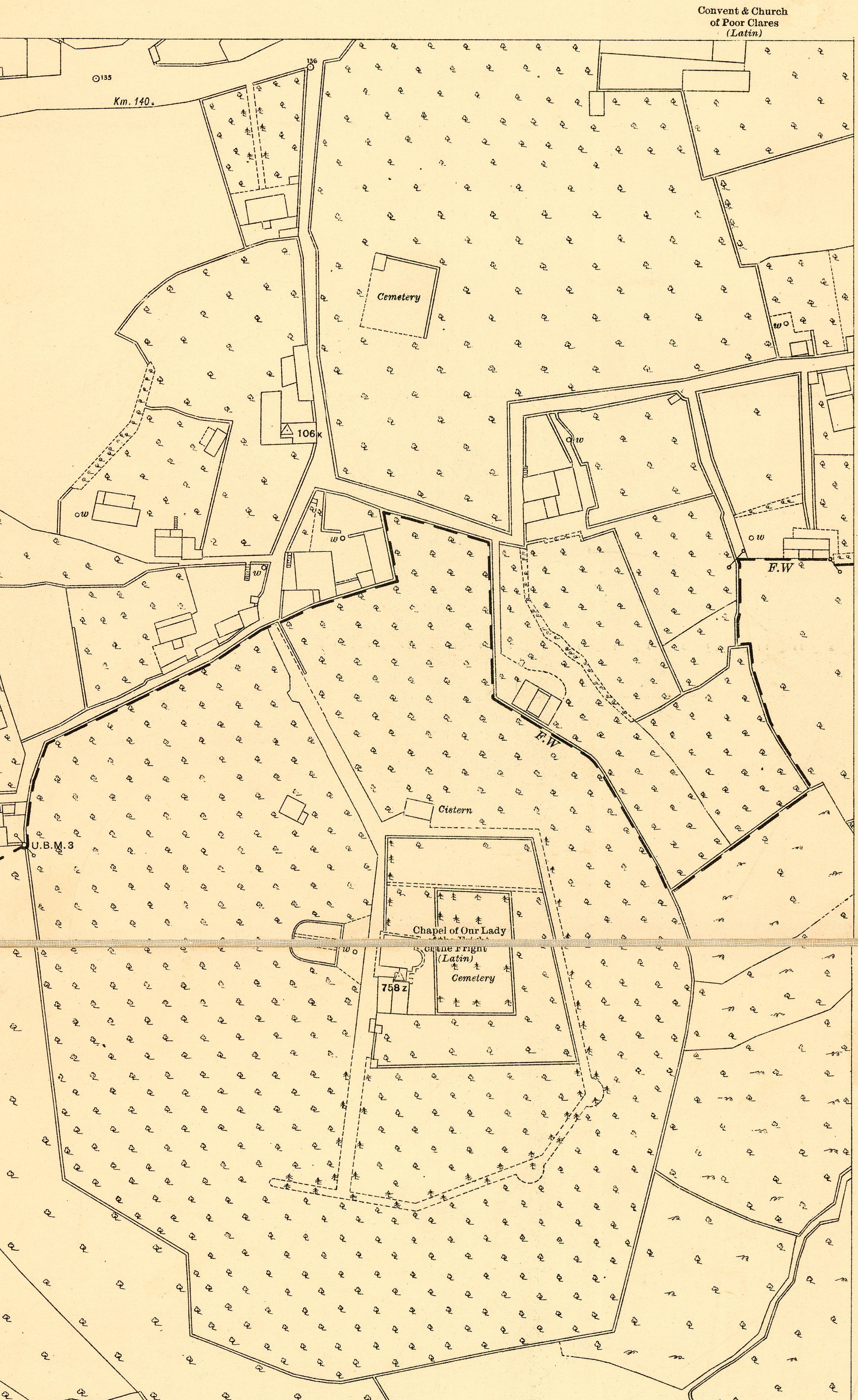
1930s map

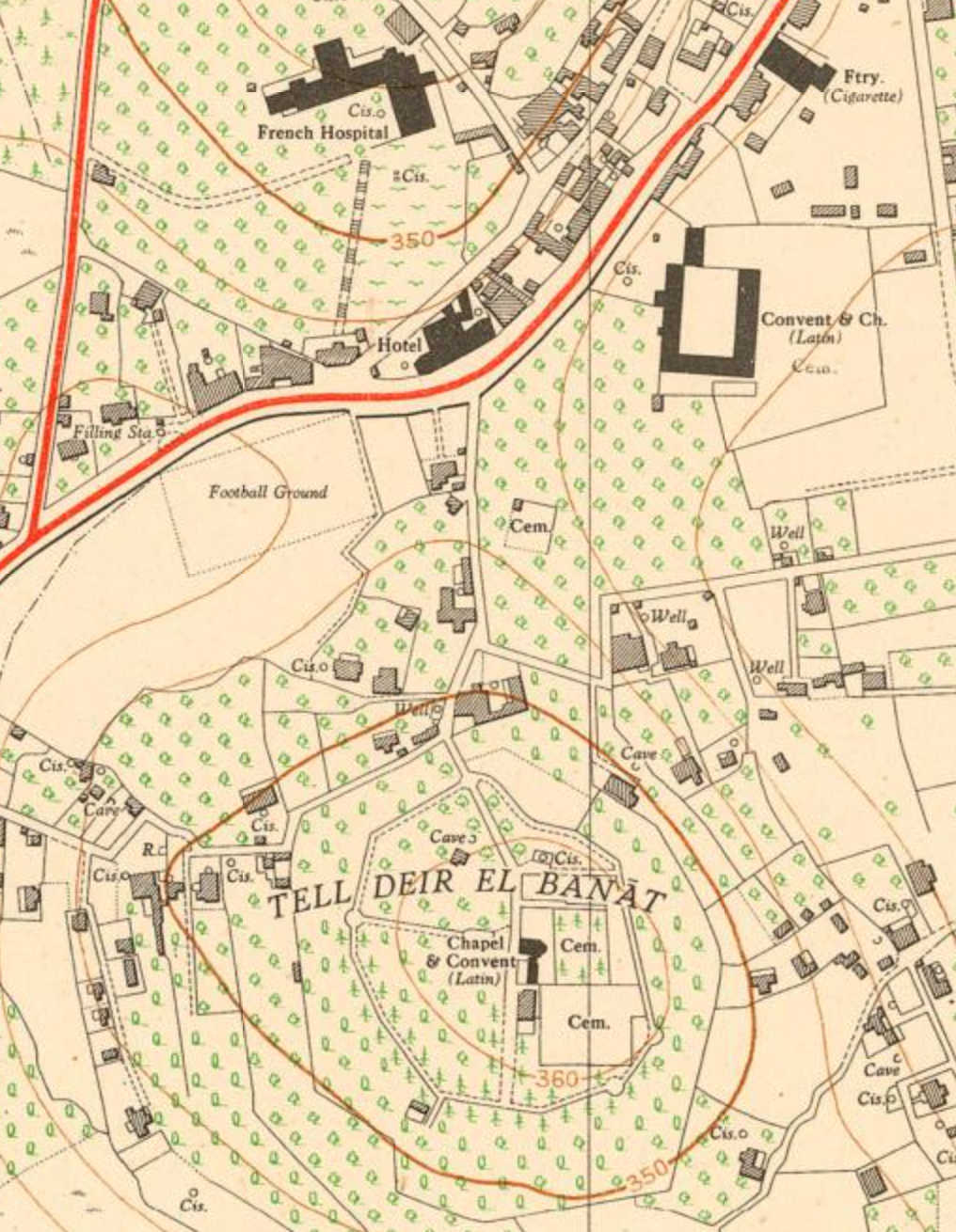
1940s map

At the outbreak of World War I, the French nuns of the convent were deported from the Ottoman Empire, the two countries being parts of opposing alliances. The nuns of Nazareth moved to a convent on Malta, while those in Jerusalem moved to Egypt. The Maltese community was first established at Żabbar before moving to St Julian's in 1920.

The Nazarene convent reopened in 1949, the year of the establishment of modern Israel. It was not reestablished at its former ruined location on the main road to Haifa, however, but on the monastery grounds about a third of a kilometer (1/5 mile) further south at the foot of Tremor Hill. It is now usually overseen by a Franciscan priest selected by the Latin Patriarch in addition to its own abbess. In 1974, the Guanelliano Ugo Sensi selected the former convent as the site for a new special education school. After repairs and refurbishing, the Holy Family School opened its doors to its first four students a year later in 1975; it now cares for over 170 learning disabled students between the ages of 4 and 21.

The three elderly sisters from Abidjan, Ivory Coast, who cared for the Clarissan monastery from around 1999 were supplemented by eight from Zacatecas, Mexico, in 2015. The Poor Clares of Nazareth now speak French and Spanish to one another, English to visitors, Arabic to neighbors, Hebrew for government purposes, and Italian for their daily services with the town's Franciscan brothers at the nearby Church of the Annunciation supposedly built on the site of Mary's former home. The nuns are chiefly concerned with prayer and religious life but also play volleyball, make olive rosaries, and dry local flowers for inclusion in cards sold to pilgrims.

== Our Lady of the Fright ==
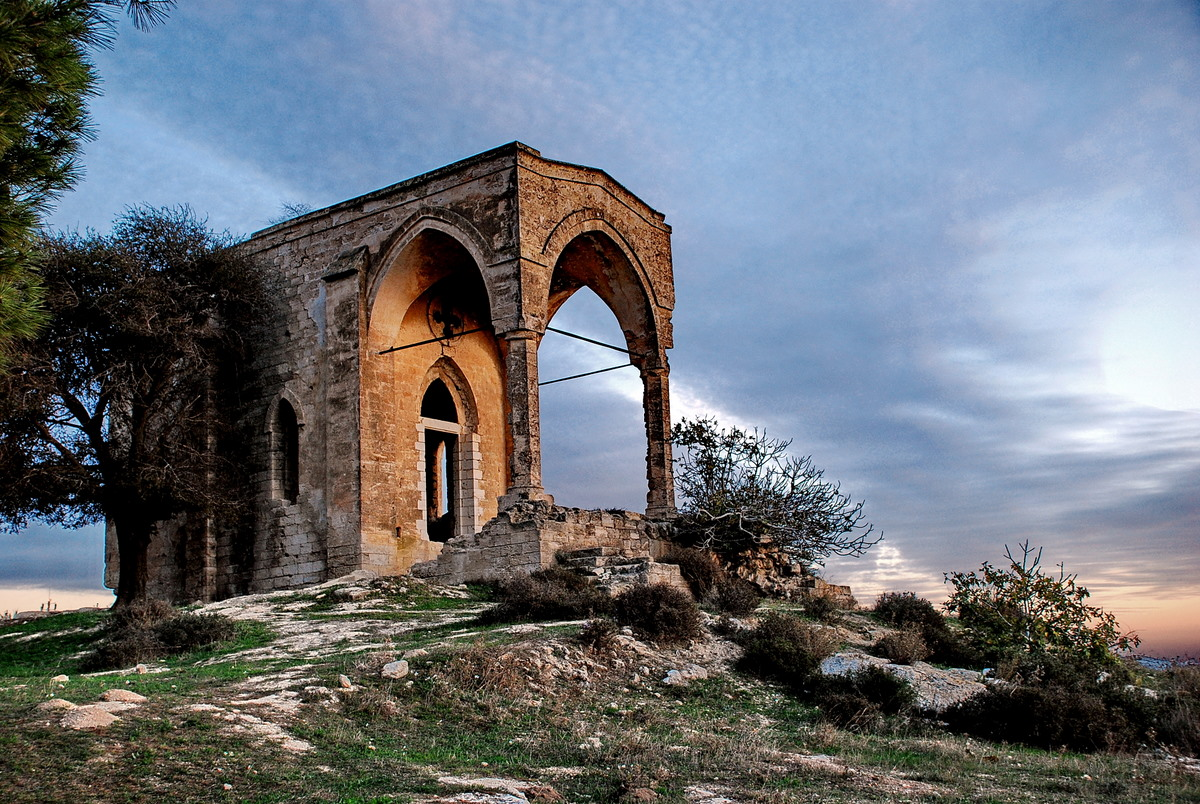
The ruins of Our Lady of the Fright

The grounds of the convent include the former site of a Franciscan chapel built around 1875 and demolished in 1969. As recorded by Alfonso Mangialardo da Trani in 1905, it was about 7 by 14.5 meters (23 ft × 48 ft), with 1.2-meter (3.9 ft) thick walls and a 3.2-meter (10 ft) semi-circular apse ending in a chevet to the east. The apse offered additional rooms extending north and south.

It had been constructed on the foundation of an earlier Catholic chapel dating to the Crusader era which had fallen into ruins by the 17th century. This earlier chapel had probably been dedicated to St Mary of the Fear (Italian: Santa Maria della Paura; Latin: Sancta Maria de Timor), although Boniface of Ragusa attributed it to St Anne. The Byzantine chapel of St Zachariah may have preceded it at the same location or been located nearby.

== See also ==
- Clare of Assisi
- Poor Clares
- Charles de Foucauld
- Servants of Charity
