= St. Clare's Monastery =

St. Clare or St. Claire's Monastery may refer to:

- St. Clare's Monastery, Copenhagen, in Denmark (1497–1536)
- St. Clare's Monastery (Duncan), in British Columbia (1912–present)
- St. Clare's Monastery, Lima, in Peru (1606–present)
- Abbey of the Minoresses of St. Clare without Aldgate, in England (c.1290–1539)
- Monastery Saint Claire, in Nazareth, Israel
- Monastery of Santa Clara-a-Nova, in Portugal (1677–present)
- Monastery of Santa Clara-a-Velha, in Portugal (1330–1677)
- Any monastery of the Order of St. Clare, worldwide

== See also ==
- Category:Poor Clare monasteries
- St. Clare's Convent (disambiguation)
