= Santa Clarita (disambiguation) =

Santa Clarita is a city in northwestern Los Angeles County, California, United States.

Santa Clarita may also refer to:

- Santa Clarita Valley
- Santa Clarita station

== See also ==
- Clarita (disambiguation)
- Santa Clara (disambiguation)
- Santa Clarita Diet, an American web TV series
