= Claritas Rupes =

Geologic feature of Mars

- Claritas Rupes based on THEMIS day-time image
- Coordinates: 26°S 105.4°W

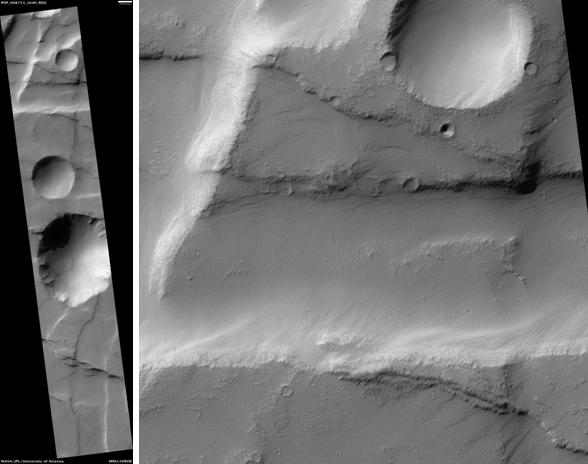
Claritas Rupes, as seen by HiRISE. Click on image to see layers. Scale bar is 1000 meters long.

Claritas Rupes is a scarp in the Phoenicis Lacus quadrangle of Mars, located at 26° South and 105.4° West. It is 924 km long and was named after an albedo feature at 25S, 110W. The term "Rupes" is used in planetary geology to refer to an escarpments or cliff on Mars and other planets. It is the Latin word for cliff.
