= Santa Chiara, Pieve di Cento =

Church in Pieve di Cento, Italy

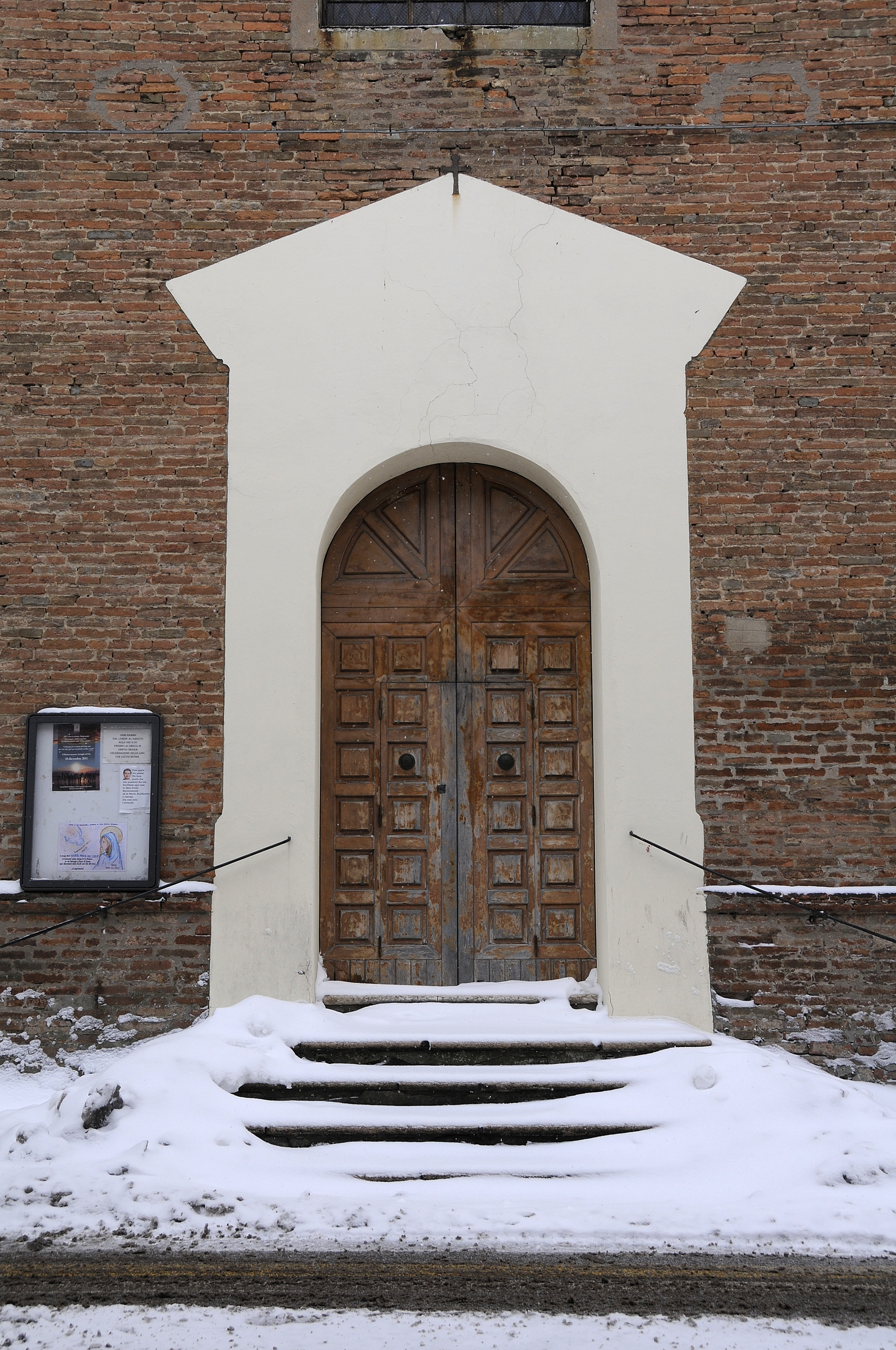
Church of Santa Chiara

Santa Chiara is a Baroque style, Roman Catholic church or chapel constructed as part of the former Convent of the Clarissan nuns in Pieve di Cento, Region of Emilia-Romagna, Italy.

== History ==
The church was erected during 1633–1645, though much of the decoration of the ceilings and altar date to the late 18th century. The main altarpiece depicts Saints Francis, Anthony of Padua, and Agnes, with the Madonna and Child, granting the monastic robe to St Clair (1655-1657) was completed by Benedetto Gennari, grandson of Guercino.

Below the painting is a metal grating that linked to the church to a chapel inside the cloistered convent, from where the nuns could attend to the service without exiting. The altar has a panel in scagliola depicting an event in the Life of St Clair, where armed with the eucharist, she deters the Saracen looters assaulting the monastery of San Damiano, Assisi.

The church organ was constructed by Carlo Traeri in 1687. In 2014, the instrument was not functioning. The frescoes on the walls around the main altar delineate an apse, with an elaborate altar panel with Solomonic columns. The decoration has a number of trompe-l'œil decorations. The ceiling decoration depicts a faux wooden ceiling; in the center, a Glory of St Claire is depicted, surrounded by four trophies of liturgical instruments: chalices, monstrance, croziers, processional crosses and signs, set against a background that mimics a tangle of reeds.
