= St Clare's School =

St Clare's School is the name of several schools, most named after Saint Clare of Assisi, and may refer to:

== Schools ==
- St Clare's Catholic Primary School, from List of schools in Cheshire West and Chester, England
- St Clare's Catholic Primary School, in Narellan Vale, New South Wales, Australia
- St. Clare's Girls' School, a Catholic school in Hong Kong
- St Clare's, Oxford, an independent international school in England
- St Clare's School, Newton, a coeducational independent school in South Wales
- Saint Clare School, a Catholic elementary school in Santa Clara, California
- St. Clare School, a Catholic school affiliated with St. Clare's Church (Staten Island, New York)

== See also ==
- St. Clare's (disambiguation)
