= Clarita Hunsberger =

American diver

Personal information
- Full name: Clarita Hunsberger Neher
- Nationality: United States
- Born: April 26, 1906
- Died: December 6, 2001 (aged 95)

Sport
- Sport: Diving
- Event: Women's 10 metre platform

Clarita Hunsberger Neher (April 26, 1906 – December 6, 2001) was an American athlete who participated in the 1924 and 1928 Olympics diving competitions. She was born in Michigan in 1906 and moved to Los Angeles with her family when she was either three or four. After a tragedy in which a close family friend died swimming in a riptide, Clarita's father decided that she needed swimming lessons. She became active in the Los Angeles Athletic Club, and eventually attended Stanford University from which she graduated in 1927.

In 1924 she was an alternate on the diving team during the Olympics in Paris, but was part of the primary team in 1928 at the Amsterdam.

After her experience in the Olympics, she taught and later became an administrator in Los Angeles Unified School District. She was an avid traveler and visited all seven continents during her life. In 1984, Clarita participated in the Olympic Organizing Committee for the games in Los Angeles. She spoke throughout California about her Olympic experience, "emphasizing the values of individual achievement and sportsmanship over political counts of gold medals."

Clarita Hunsberger-Neher died on December 6, 2001.
