= Matthew St. Clair =

American environmentalist

- Education: Swarthmore College (BA); Rausser College of Natural Resources, University of California, Berkeley (MA)
- Employer: University of California
- Awards: 2020 LEED Fellow

Matthew (Matt) St. Clair is an American environmentalist who is the Director of Sustainability for the University of California system of ten university campuses.

== Early life and education ==
St. Clair grew up in the Inland Empire region of Southern California. He has a BA degree in Economics from Swarthmore College and an MA in Environmental Policy from the Energy and Resources Group at the University of California, Berkeley. From 1998 to 2000, he volunteered with Friends of the Earth in the Czech Republic, and gained experience and an appreciation for the impact of effective environmental activism.

== Career ==
As a graduate student, St. Clair led a student campaign for the University of California system to adopt a comprehensive green building and clean energy planning policy. The University of California then hired him to implement this policy. This policy has included powering new buildings with electricity generated without carbon emissions, and increasing the number of campus buildings that are LEED certified, including every building on the new campus of the University of California, Merced. It has also included creating its own utility company, including financing new solar power generation facilities.

He is a founding member of the Board of Directors for the Association for the Advancement of Sustainability in Higher Education.

In 2020, he was named a LEED Fellow by Green Business Certification Inc.
