= Santa Clara =

Santa Clara (Portuguese and Spanish for Saint Clare or Saint Clair) may refer to:

== Places ==
=== Africa ===
- Santa-Clara (municipality) or Curoca, Angola
- Santa Clara, Gabon

=== Asia ===
- Santa Clara, Quezon, Philippines
- Santa Clara, Santa Maria, Philippines
- Santa Clara, Santo Tomas, Batangas, Philippines

=== Europe ===
- Santa Clara, Coimbra, Portugal
- Santa Clara, Lisbon, Portugal
- Santa Clara-a-Velha, Odemira, Portugal
- Santa Clara-a-Nova e Gomes Aires, Almodôvar, Portugal
- Santa Clara (Ponta Delgada), Azores
- Santa Clara Island (San Sebastian), Spain

=== North and Central America ===
- Santa Clara, Corozal District, Belize
- Santa Clara Province, Cuba
  - Santa Clara, Cuba
- Santa Clara, Consolación del Sur, Cuba
- Santa Clara, San Vicente, El Salvador
- Santa Clara La Laguna, Guatemala
- Santa Clara, Chiriquí, Panama
- Santa Clara, Coclé, Panama
- Santa Clara, Panamá Oeste, Panama
- Santa Clara, Durango, Mexico
- Santa Clara del Cobre, Mexico
- Santa Clara (Mexibús), a BRT station in Ecatepec, Mexico
- Santa Clara (Mexicable), an aerial lift station in Ecatepec, Mexico

==== United States ====
- Santa Clara County, California, in the San Francisco Bay Area
  - Santa Clara, California, a city within the county
    - Santa Clara Transit Center, in the city
    - Santa Clara University, in the city
      - Mission Santa Clara de Asís, origin of the city and county, now surrounded by the university
  - Santa Clara station (VTA), a light rail station on Santa Clara Street in San Jose, the largest city in Santa Clara County
  - Santa Clara Valley, better known as "Silicon Valley", including Santa Clara County and other counties
  - Santa Clara Valley AVA, a wine region primarily in the county
- Santa Clara River (California), in Ventura and Los Angeles counties in Southern California
  - Santa Clara River Valley, in Ventura County
- Santa Clara station (Metrorail), Allapattah, Miami, Florida
- Santa Clara, New Mexico
- Santa Clara Indian Reservation, New Mexico
  - Santa Clara Pueblo, New Mexico
- Santa Clara, New York
- Santa Clara, Eugene, Oregon
- Santa Clara, Texas
- Santa Clara, Utah
- Santa Clara River (Utah)
- Santa Clara Volcano, Utah

=== South America ===
- Santa Clara, Jujuy, Argentina
- Santa Clara, La Rioja, Argentina
- Santa Clara do Sul, Rio Grande do Sul, Brazil
- Santa Clara d'Oeste, São Paulo, Brazil
- Santa Clara Island, Chile
- Santa Clara Island (Ecuador)

== Sport ==
- Santa Clara (baseball club), a Cuban team from 1922 to 1941, known as the Leopards
- C.D. Santa Clara de El Salvador, a football club in Pasaquina, La Union
- C.D. Santa Clara, a football club in Santa Clara, Ponta Delgada, Azores

== Other uses ==
- Niña, or Santa Clara, one of the three ships on Christopher Columbus's first voyage
- English carrack Holigost, originally Santa Clara, a 15th century ship
- The Santa Clara, the student newspaper of Santa Clara University, California
- Battle of Santa Clara, a 1958 conflict in Cuba

== See also ==
- Saint Clair (disambiguation)
- Saint Clare (disambiguation)
- St. Claire (disambiguation)
- Santa Clarita (disambiguation)
- St. Clara, West Virginia
- Saint Clara (film)
