= St. Clare's Convent =

St. Clare's Convent, St. Clare's Priory, Poor Clare's Convent, Convent of Santa Clara, or other variations on the name, may refer to:

== Cuba ==
- Convento de Santa Clara de Asis, Havana

== Denmark ==
- St. Clare's Priory, Copenhagen

== France ==
- Poor Clare Convent (Gravelines)

== Israel ==
- Monastery St. Claire, Jerusalem
- Monastery St. Claire, Nazareth

== Mexico ==
- Poor Clare convent of Mexico City, now Library of the Congress of Mexico

== Peru ==
- Convent of Santa Clara, Lima

== Portugal ==
- Convent of Santa Clara, Vila do Conde

== Spain ==
- Royal Convent of Santa Clara, Tordesillas
- Convent of Santa Clara of Gandia

== Sweden ==
- St. Clare's Priory, Stockholm

== United Kingdom ==
- Convent of Poor Clares, Woodchester

== United States ==
- St. Clare's Church (Staten Island, New York)#Convent

== See also ==
- St. Clare's Monastery (disambiguation)
