= St. Clair County =

St. Clair County is the name of four counties in the United States:

- St. Clair County, Alabama
- St. Clair County, Illinois
- St. Clair County, Michigan
- St. Clair County, Missouri
