= Santa Clara, Jujuy =

Coordinates: 24°17′S 64°41′W

Santa Clara (Jujuy)
- Municipality and town
- Interactive map of Santa Clara (Jujuy)
- Country: Argentina
- Province: Jujuy Province
- Time zone: UTC−3 (ART)

Santa Clara (Jujuy) is a town and municipality in Jujuy Province in Argentina.
