= St. Clare's Church =

St. Clare's Church, St. Clare Church, Saint Clare's Church, Church of St Clare or other variations on the name, may refer to:

== Cuba ==
- Catedral de Santa Clara de Asís (Cathedral of Saint Clare of Assisi), in Santa Clara

== India ==
- St Clara's Church (Assonora)

== Paraguay ==
- St. Claire Cathedral, Villarrica

== Poland ==
- Chapel of the Sisters of the Poor Clares, Bydgoszcz
- Poor Clares' Church, Bydgoszcz

== Portugal ==
- Igreja de Santa Clara (Porto) (Church of Saint Clare)
- Igreja de Santa Clara (Santarém) (Church of Saint Clare)

== Sweden ==
- Klara Church, Stockholm

== Ukraine ==
- Church of St. Clare, Horodkivka

== United Kingdom ==
- St Clare's Church, Liverpool
- St Clare of Assisi, Middlesbrough

== United States ==
- Saint Clare Parish, in Santa Clara, California
- St. Clare Church (Manhattan), New York
- St. Clare of Assisi's Church (Bronx), New York
- St. Clare's Church (Staten Island, New York)

== Uruguay ==
- San Antonio y Santa Clara, Montevideo (Church of Saint Anthony and Saint Clare)

== See also ==
- Santa Chiara (disambiguation), including a list of namesake churches in Italy
