= San Damiano Cross =

Romanesque painted cross

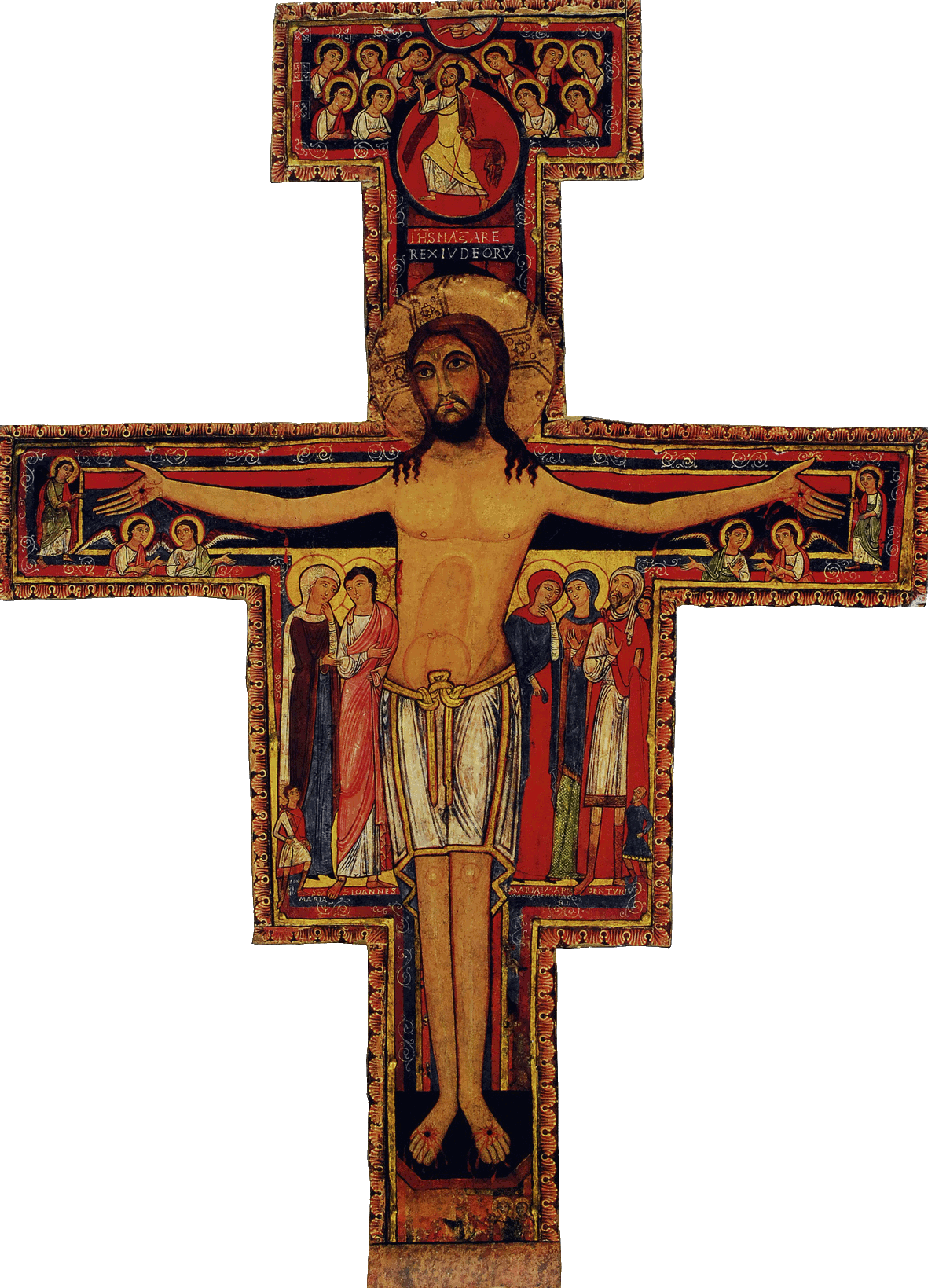
The San Damiano Cross

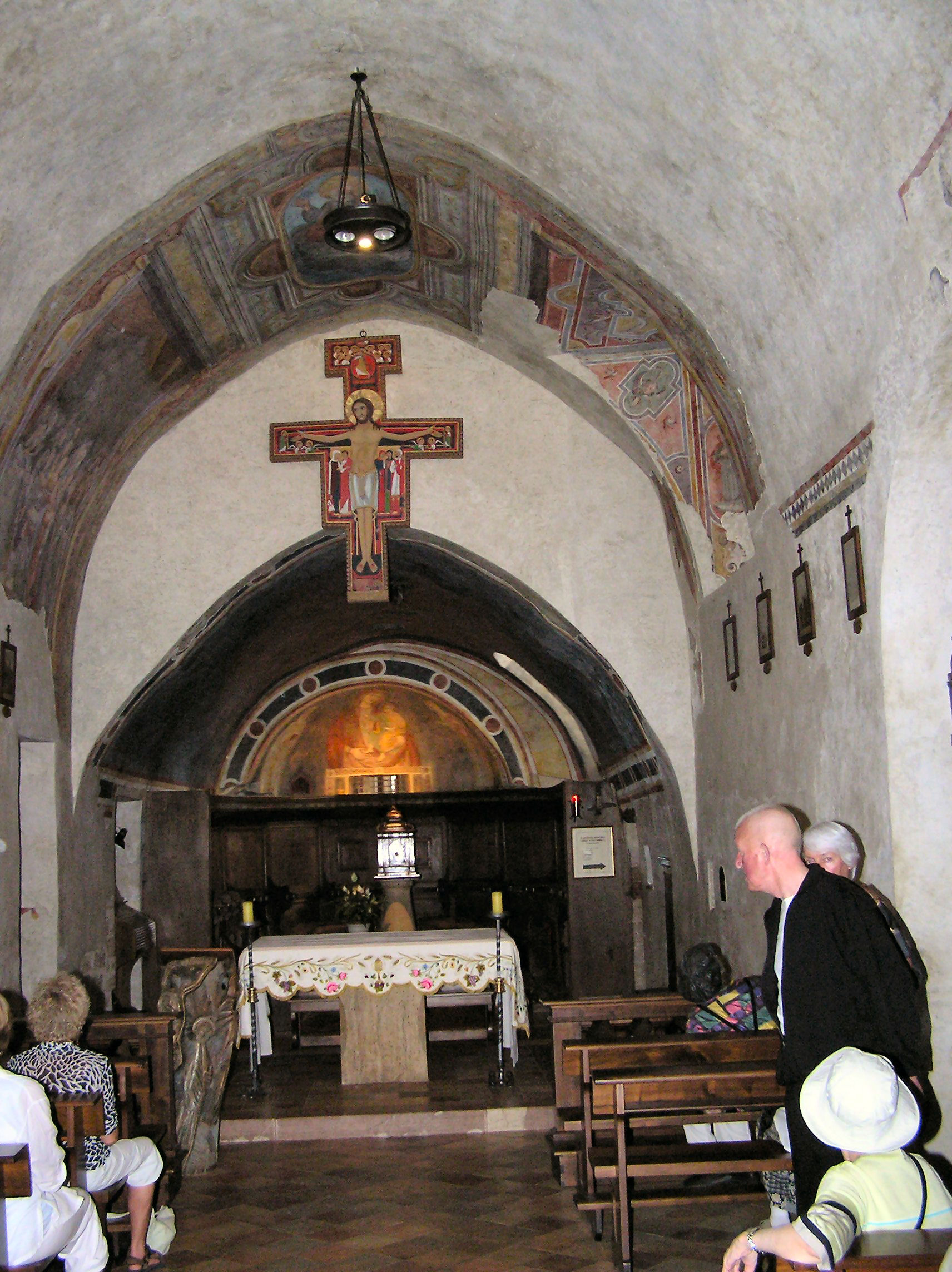
Copy now in the original position inside the Church of San Damiano

The San Damiano Cross is the large Romanesque rood cross before which St. Francis of Assisi was praying when he is said to have received the commission from the Lord to rebuild the Church. It hangs in the Basilica of Saint Clare (Basilica di Santa Chiara) in Assisi, Italy, with a replica in its original position in the church of San Damiano nearby. Franciscans cherish this cross as the symbol of their mission from God.

The cross is a crucifix of a type sometimes called an icon cross because in addition to the main figure of the Christ, it contains images of other saints and people related to the incident of Christ's crucifixion. The tradition of such painted crucifixes began in the Eastern Church and possibly reached Italy via Montenegro and Croatia.

== History ==
The San Damiano Cross was one of a number of crosses painted with similar figures during the 11th century in Umbria. The name of the painter is unknown, but it was made around the year 1100. The purpose of an icon cross was to teach the meaning of the event depicted and thereby strengthen the faith of the people. The Byzantine style was common in Italy before Cimabue and Giotto.

According to Franciscan tradition, it was while praying before this cross in the chapel of San Damiano, just outside Assisi, that Francis of Assisi received a call to rebuild the Church.

When the Poor Clares moved from San Damiano to the Basilica of Santa Chiara in 1257, they took the original San Damiano Cross with them and still guard it with great solicitude. It now hangs in the Basilica over the altar of the Chapel of the Crucifix – a reconstruction of the Church of Saint George, which was torn down to build the Basilica. The crucifix hanging over the altar of the ancient church of San Damiano is a copy. Franciscans regard this cross as a symbol of their mission to commit their lives and resources to renewing and rebuilding the Church.

== Description ==
Jesus Christ is represented upright in full stature while the surrounding figures are smaller. The bright white of his body contrasts with the dark red and black around it and accentuates the prominence of Jesus. This representation contrasts with the regal Christ portrayed on the cross in earlier centuries and the suffering, dying, crucified Christ depicted generally throughout the Church since the beginning of the 14th century. Above the head of Christ is the inscription in Latin: Jesus of Nazareth, King of the Jews.

The next largest figures are five witnesses of the crucifixion. On the left side are the Virgin Mary and St. John the Evangelist. On the right side are Mary Magdalene, Mary, Mother of James, and the centurion who in Matthew's Gospel account asks Christ to heal his servant, who is also depicted on the cross on the shoulder of the centurion (Matthew 8:5-13). Both Mary and Mary Magdalene have their hands placed on their cheeks to reflect extreme grief and anguish. The first four witnesses are saints and are therefore represented with halos. Their names are written beneath their pictures.

Two smaller figures are located in the corners with the witnesses. On the lower left is Longinus the traditional name of the Roman soldier who pierced the side of Jesus with a lance. He is represented here as holding the lance and looking up at Jesus. The blood running down the right arm of Jesus begins at the elbow and drips straight down and will land on the upturned face of Longinus. In the lower right is Stephaton, the traditional name for the soldier who offered Jesus the sponge soaked in vinegar wine.

Peering over the left shoulder of the centurion is a small face. A close look reveals the tops of the heads of three others beside him. This represents the centurion's son who was healed by Jesus and the rest of his family to show that "he and his whole household believed" (John 4:45-54).

Six angels are represented as marvelling over the event of the crucifixion. They are positioned at both ends of the crossbar. Their hand gestures indicate they are discussing this wondrous event of the death and calling us to marvel with them.

At the foot of the cross there is a damaged picture of six figures, two of whom are represented with halos. In accordance with the traditions of the day, these six are the patrons of Umbria: St. Damian, St. Michael, St. Rufino, St. John the Baptist, St. Peter and St. Paul. On the top of the cross, one sees Jesus now fully clothed in his regal garments and carrying the cross as a triumphant sceptre. He is climbing out of the tomb and into the heavenly courts. Ten angels are crowded around, five of whom have their hands extended in a welcoming gesture to Jesus, who himself has his hand raised in the form of a greeting,

At the very top of the cross is the Hand of God with two fingers extended. This is to be understood as the blessing of God the Father on the sacrifice of his Son. On the right side of the picture next to the left calf of Jesus, there is a small figure of a fowl. Some art historians have interpreted it to be a rooster, representing the sign of Jesus' denial by Peter, mentioned in all four Gospel accounts. Other commentators see it as a peacock, a frequent symbol of immortality in Early Christian art.

== See also ==
- Francis of Assisi
- Basilica di Santa Chiara
- San Damiano, Assisi
- Crucifix
- Poor Clares
- Clare of Assisi

== Sources ==
- The Franciscan Vision and the Gospel of John: The San Damiano Crucifix, Francis and John, Creation and John, by Michael Guinan, Franciscan Institute Publications, 2006. ISBN 978-1-57659-204-5
- Controversial Crucifix Creates Rift at Warr Acres Church, by John Estus, 2010
