= Agnes of Assisi =

Christian saint

Saint Agnes of Assisi
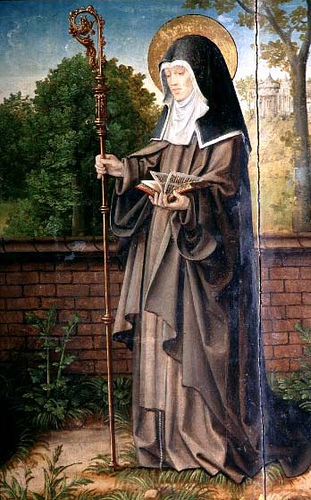

Virgin
- Born: 1197 or 1198; Assisi, Italy
- Died: 16 November 1253; Assisi, Italy
- Venerated in: Roman Catholicism; Order of St. Clare
- Canonized: 1753 by Pope Benedict XIV
- Major shrine: Basilica of St. Clare; Assisi, Italy
- Feast: 16 November
- Attributes: Poor Clare nun holding a book

Agnes of Assisi (1197/1198 — 1253) was one of the founding members of the Poor Clares. Agnes eventually established the convent of Monticelli near Florence, then went on to establish orders in Verona, Padua, Venice, and Mantua. As one of the first women to be a Poor Clare and an abbess in several communities, she helped to shape the order and provided both an example and a space for the many women that would follow in her footsteps.

== Life ==
Agnes (born Caterina Offreducia) and her sisters, Clare and Beatrice, were daughters of a nobleman, Count Favorino Scifi. Agnes's childhood was spent between her father's home in the city of Assisi as well as his castle of Sasso Rosso on Mount Subasio with her sisters and their mother, Ortolana.´

On 18 March 1212, Agnes's elder sister Clare, inspired by the example of Francis of Assisi, left their father's home in secret to become a follower of Francis. Sixteen days later, moved by her desire to live like Christ, Agnes ran off to the Church of St. Angelo di Panzo, where Francis had brought her sister, resolved to share Clare's life of poverty and penance.

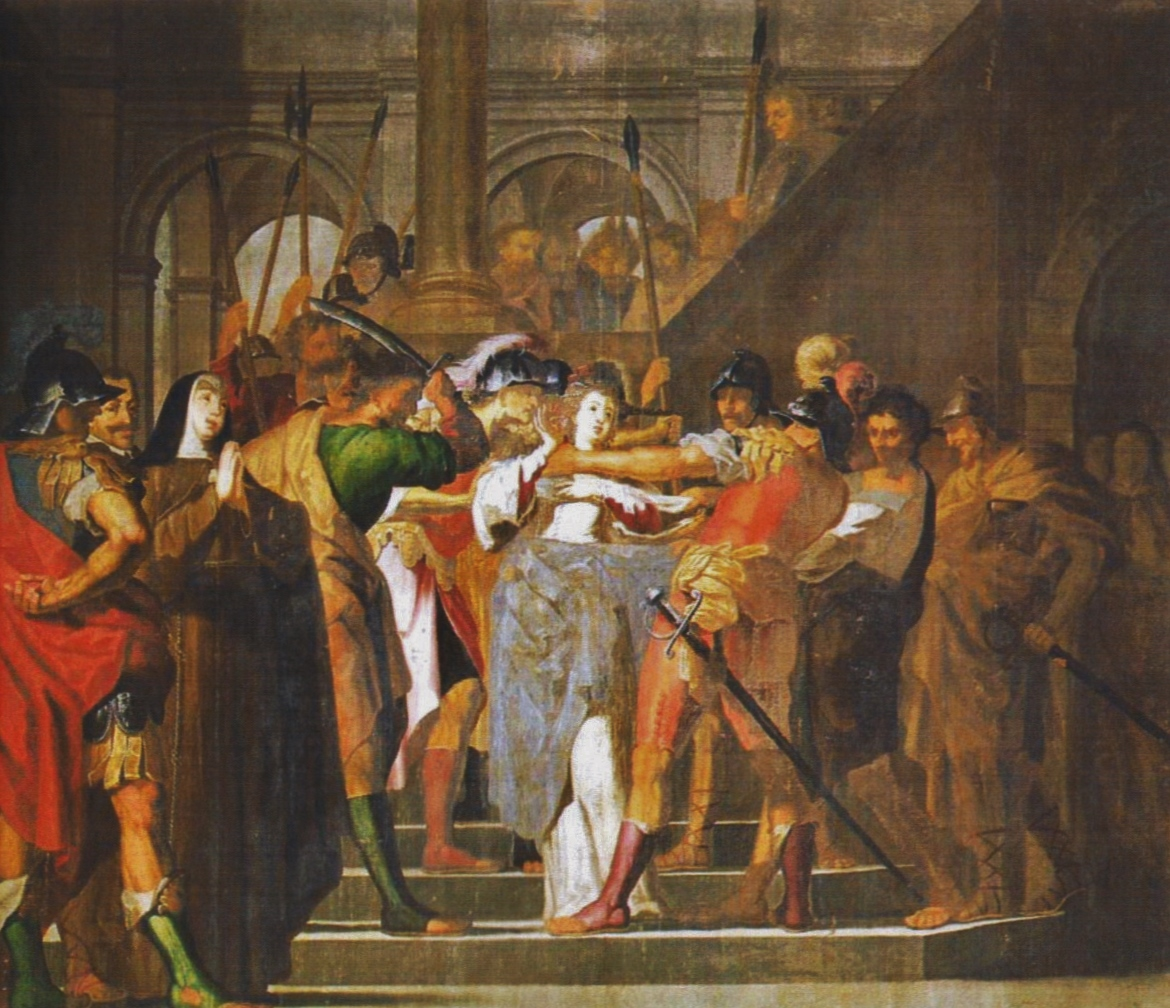
Arrival of Saint Agnes of Assisi at the Convent, António de Oliveira Bernardes, 1697

Angry at the loss of two of his daughters to the convent, their father sent his brother Monaldo and eleven other relatives and armed followers to the monastery to attempt to bring Agnes home and be wed. Agnes refused their demands, and the men began to ambush her, attempting to drag her from the church while striking and kicking her repeatedly. Her body suddenly became so heavy that the men could not lift her from the ground. This infuriated her uncle, Monaldo, who drew his sword to strike his niece. At that moment, his arm allegedly dropped to his side, withered and useless. Agnes's relatives, realizing that something divine protected her, allowed her to remain with Clare and live a life of celibacy and devotion to Christ. Her name was changed to Agnes when she became a nun, to reflect the Latin “agnus,” which means “lamb.”

Francis later established an enclosed convent for Clare and Agnes at the rural chapel of San Damiano. They were soon joined by other noblewomen of the city, and the Order of Poor Ladies, later known as the Poor Clares, began, with Clare as its abbess.

In 1221, a group of Benedictine nuns in Monticelli, near Florence, asked to become Poor Ladies. Despite being young, Agnes was chosen to lead the new community. As an abbess, Agnes was extremely loving, kind, and clever. Agnes knew how to make the practice of virtue attractive to her subjects. Although life in the Florentine convent was harmonious and without faction, she missed her sister greatly.

Agnes remained an Abbess for the rest of her life, and little is reported about her convents and their activities. She established multiple branches of the order in the cities of Verona, Padua, Venice, and Mantua. Agnes is said to have worn a hair shirt for most of her life, starting in her teen years, to deeper understand and appreciate the suffering and sacrifice of Christ.

A letter from Agnes to her sister, written from her monastery in Florence, illustrates the loss she felt during her separation from Clare. Agnes wrote that her body and soul suffered great distress and sadness and being apart from Clare brought intense sorrow upon her.

In 1253, Agnes returned to Assisi to nurse her sister Clare during the latter's illness. Clare died in August of 1253. Shortly thereafter, Agnes died on 16 November 1253. Her remains were interred with those of her sister at the Basilica of St. Clare in Assisi. Agnes's feast day is the anniversary of her death, 16 November. She was canonized in 1753, 500 years later, by Pope Benedict XIV.

== Historical context ==
In the late Middle Ages, women labored under a heavy burden of institutional and ideological disabilities. They were barred from political office; they were hampered by a host of legal restrictions; they were subjected to the authority of their male relatives; they were excluded from institutions of higher education. Women were also deemed physically, intellectually, and morally inferior to men. Yet from the twelfth century to the sixteenth, women assumed public roles of unprecedented prominence in the religious culture of their time in cities such as Assisi.

Church and society were inextricably bound up with one another, and in terms of landed wealth, political power, intellectual eminence, moral prestige, and cultural influence, the Catholic Church was a dominating presence. Ecclesiastical institutions owned approximately a quarter of all wealth. The exercise of church office was one way ruling families secured their power. Control over appointment to the church office was a primary means by which Assisi and other cities extended their control over subject territories. Control over the pulpit meant that clerics, and especially the great preaching orders of Franciscans and Dominicans, were responsible for cultural mediation on a scale that no other group could match.

During the end of the twelfth century, many European kingdoms, or states, as they are known today, began to form, shifting from a King and his land-holding lords to a larger, organized area with broader laws and the King's power somewhat controlled by a group of his nobles. Italy was nothing like that. There was a King in the Southern region of Sicily, but unlike France and England in Northwestern Europe, this King struggled to apply his rule to the daily life of the Italian city-states. Northern Italy was, technically, part of the Holy Roman Empire and therefore controlled by the King of Germany. However, the reality was much different. The Alpine Mountain range in Northern Italy made visits to that area difficult and infrequent for the German ruler, allowing the cities of Italy to form their governments.

The sovereignty held by Italian cities led to problems. Because Italy was technically held by the Holy Roman Empire, some city-states supported the German King. However, others felt more strongly that their true allegiance was to the Pope, who ruled Christendom and was geographically closer. This issue caused violent conflict between some neighboring city-states that did not agree on to whom their loyalty should belong. Assisi was one of these city-states, at war with the neighboring Perugia.

Ultimately, because these cities were independent and sovereign, they formed an identity based on the city itself. Many cities had coinage dedicated to the city itself instead of the person who ruled it. Cities passed laws and tried criminals. Cities also wanted to claim at least one saint who would represent how religious their people were. It is fitting, then, that the city of Assisi would foster three saints.

This period cultivated this religious movement because of the turmoil. When things are changing, people cling to what feels secure. In this case, that's God. Unfortunately for them, the church was corrupt. In the Catholic Church, lay people have to go through priests to get the sacraments they need, and priests are losing trust. For women, especially, religious life was a way to grow closer to God without having to involve another person. The church was not satisfactory, so Francis, Clare, and Agnes found another way to fulfill their spiritual desire for a relationship with Jesus. In the past, people had gone into the desert or wilderness. In the early thirteenth century, however, there were enough people upset with the state of the church that Francis was able to gain a lot of followers in monasteries. Along with spiritual growth, joining a monastery was a way to get away from the chaos that was happening in Italian cities. Monks and nuns did not have to go to war or live in a town where people were committing random acts of violence. It was an escape for people who wanted to get out of their dangerous, confusing cities.

This is also made possible by the spread of the Catholic Church. Italy was influenced by Catholicism, as the Pope's seat is in Rome. However, by the end of the twelfth century, Catholicism had spread to the entire continent of Europe and was beginning to have a lot of influence on rulers and common people alike. This made the Pope's position more respected and influential across a wider area, and after Francis went to him to have his order approved, it made his movement all the more legitimate to the people who agreed with him and wanted to join him. Whether or not Francis met with the Pope, which is disputed, doesn’t matter. What is important is that people think he did, and the Pope has a massive influence.

== Women in religious spaces in the Middle Ages ==
Monasteries of Franciscan women, which were rooted in the reality in which they arose, embarked on a silent life of prayer and humble manual labor in residences that became places of meeting and evangelical illumination in the very centers of cities or in their immediate vicinity. The group formed by Clare, Agnes, and their followers echoed the words and spirit of Francis. But it is difficult to determine to what extent the Franciscan order itself was responsible for the rise of the myriad groups of women all over northern and central Italy, whose numbers will strike anyone who glances through the pages of the Bullarium Franciscanum. Everything we know suggests that the Franciscans were a catalyst for a movement already in existence; but there is little evidence from the early years of Clare, Agnes, and their companions at San Damiano, evidence that captures the group at the time of its creation and before it took on the form imposed on it by later regulations.

Francis never believed that the ties linking him and his friars with the women of San Damiano should be extended to the whole movement that sprang from the program lived by Clare, Agnes, and their group. Francis's blunt rejection of women being in the same religious spaces as men was in keeping with that of many other religious orders, which considered the spiritual guidance of nuns to be a burden and danger to their own spiritual life. But a more specific reason for his refusal may have been the fear that his Minorites would be transformed into a monastic order, a transformation that such an obligation would cause or at least encourage. The Franciscan movement was unique in its time because it called for living like Jesus and being with the people, not a life of sequestered prayer in a monastery like other religious orders. This made Franciscan nuns a complication because women travelling across Italy was not socially acceptable. Although women could not travel and spread the word of Christ as Francis did, they could follow his example of charity to the people in their communities and living in poverty.

In their relationship with Francis and in their radical manner of living according to the Gospels, the Poor Ladies of San Damiano soon became a reference point for groups of women who desired to live a religious life.

The small group of women who gathered around Clare of Assisi at San Damiano represents perhaps the richest and certainly the best-known wellspring of the larger female religious movement that arose in Italy, as in other European countries, between the end of the twelfth century and the beginning of the thirteenth. Theirs was a restless movement, one that sought and demanded new forms of religious expression and found in the orders then extant neither room nor voice for the yearning that marked it most profoundly. Francis assigned to Clare and her sisterhood the restored church and house of San Damiano just below the walls of Assisi.

Agnes's relatives were eventually okay with her transition to religious life because religion was such a huge part of everyday life. They were initially upset because they wanted her to get married, which would have supported her family's wealth, status, and social connections. Her denial of marriage in 13th Century Italy was a great loss for her noble, well-connected family. Her relatives tried to take Agnes from the church, but she reportedly became so heavy they could not lift her: a miracle of God's doing. If God wanted her there, then she could stay. People so devoted to God could nor would not openly defy his will. They must have also taken comfort in knowing that Francis had (reportedly) met with the Pope, a very powerful man. Without such a religious society, Agnes may have been forced to leave her life as a nun, even with a miracle from God.

Agnes of Assisi rose to prominence because of the circumstances in which she lived. She was inspired by her sister, who was inspired by Francis's religious movement. His movement happened in the early thirteenth century because of the unrest and discontent Italians faced in their everyday lives, and they found a way to escape that in Francis's teachings. Agnes's sainthood, even delayed, reflects the desire of Italian city-states to lay claim to people who would heighten their power in a world where piety and individualism were incredibly important. Agnes is unique because she was not made a saint immediately following her death, but that doesn’t make her unimportant. Agnes of Assisi is not the most famous of saints, but she may not be a canonized saint at all had she not lived in thirteenth-century Italy.

== Historiography and legacy ==
Despite Clare being very well documented and remembered, Agnes is entirely the opposite. Her name is rarely mentioned in scholarship, and never without some reference to her sister. While in recent years more research has been published about early Franciscan nuns, for centuries these women were neglected by academics.

Agnes was not made a saint for five hundred years after her death, even though her sister was made a saint within two years. This is likely because Clare determined and wrote the rule for the Order of Poor Ladies, and she was the first to join Francis. For this reason, records of Clare, her letters, and her activities are well kept. People in Clare's time knew she was important because she authored the rule for the Poor Ladies and communicated with powerful men about the establishment of the order. Agnes worked closely with her sister, but she was more reserved. She followed the rule, but she wasn't the author, which, to the people that knew her, lessened her significance within the order, even though Agnes lived a very similar pious life devoted to God.

== Sources ==
- Andenna, Cristina. "Female Religious Life in the Twelfth and Thirteenth Centuries." In The Cambridge History of Medieval Monasticism in the Latin West, edited by Allison I. Beach and Isabelle Cochelin. University of Cambridge Press, 2020.
- Arnald of Sarrant. Chronicle of the Twenty Four-Generals of The Order of Friars Minor Translated by Noel Muscat. TAU Franciscan Communications, 2010.
- Bartoli, Marco. Chiara d'Assisi. Instituto Storico dei Cappucini, 1989.
- Chittolini, Giorgio. “Cities, “City-States,” and Regional States in North-Central Italy.” Theory and Society 18 (1989): 689-706.
- Conroy, Finbarr, and Gemma Fortini. "The Noble Family of St. Clare of Assisi." Franciscan Studies 42 (1982): 48-67.
- Dalarun, Jaques. "Frances and Clare of Assisi: Differing Perspectives on Gender and Power." Franciscan Studies 63 (2005): 11-25.
- Green, Victor G. "The Franciscans in Medieval English Life (1224 - 1348)." Franciscan Studies 20 (1939): V-XI, 1-164.
- Jones, P.J. “Communes and Despots: The City State in Late-Medieval Italy.” Transactions of the Royal Historical Society 15 (1965): 71-96.
- Pelligrini, Luigi. “Female Religious Experience and Society in Thirteenth-Century Italy.” In Monks and Nuns, Saints and Outcasts: Religion in Medieval Society, edited by Sharon Farmer and Barbara Rosenwein. Cornell University Press, 2000.
- Robinson, Paschal. "St. Agnes of Assisi." In The Catholic Encyclopedia. Robert Appleton Company, 1907.
- Roest, Bert. “Order Matters, Exceptions Rule: The Poor Clares as a Historiographical Problem.” In Shaping Stability: The Normation and Formation of Religious Life in the Middle Ages, edited by Krijin Pansters and Abraham Plunkett-Latimer. Bepols Press, 2016.
- Thompson, Augustine. Francis of Assisi: A New Biography. Cornell University Press, 2012.
- Women and Religion in Medieval and Renaissance Italy, edited by Daniel Bornstein and Roberto Rusconi. Translated by Margery J. Schneider. University of Chicago Press, 1996.
