= Ortolana =

Mother of Saint Clare of Assisi and Saint Agnes of Assisi

Blessed Ortolana of Assisi (sometimes spelled Hortulana, born in the 12th century – 2 January 1238 in Assisi) – blessed of the Catholic Church, she is known as a nun of The Order of Saint Clare (Poor Clares). She was the wife of Favarone Offreduccio, and mother of Saint Clare of Assisi and Saint Agnes of Assisi, who both entered religious life. After her husband's death, the widow Ortolana joined The Monastery of San Damiano.
