= Poor Clares =

Catholic order of convent nuns

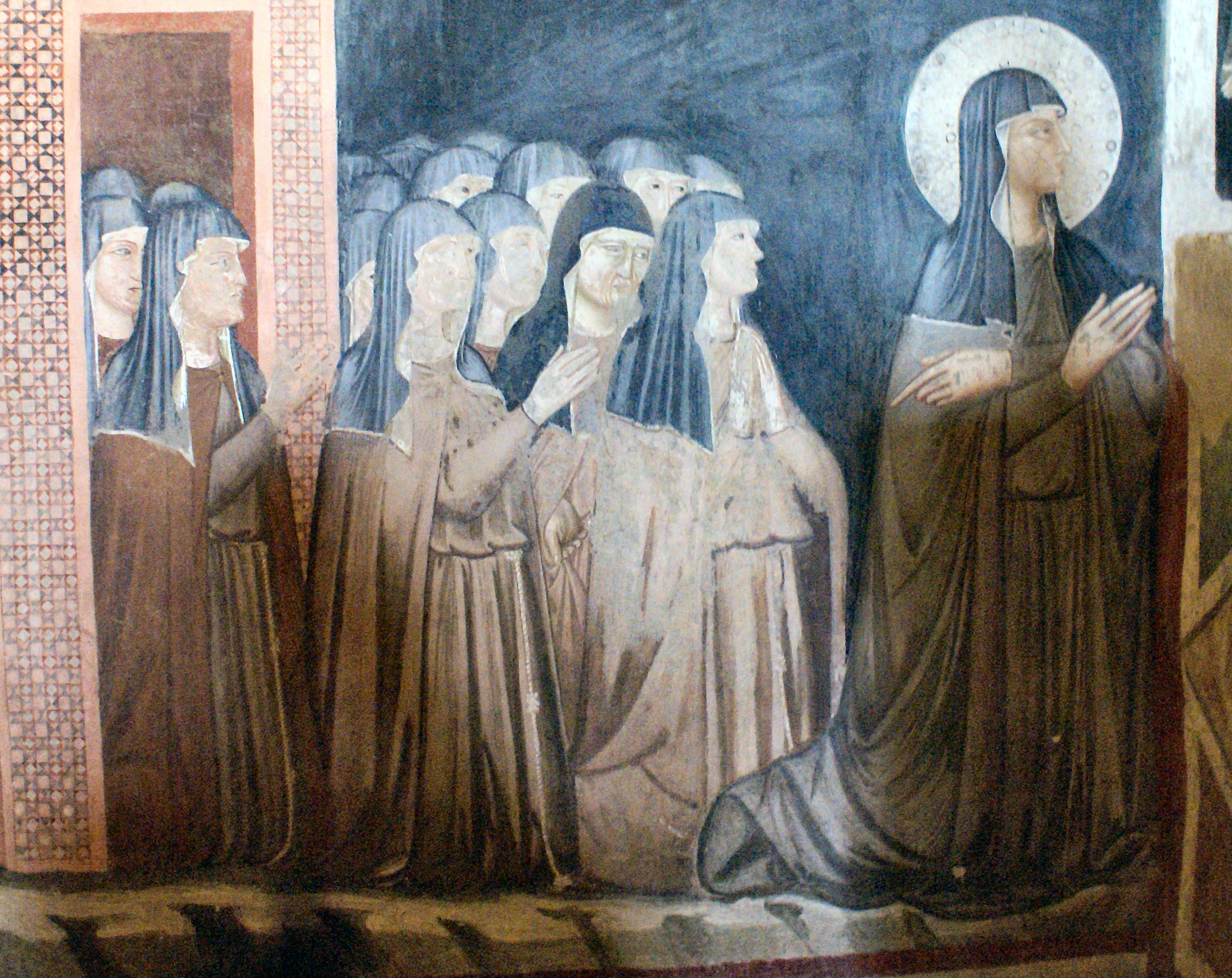
Fresco of Saint Clare and nuns of her order, Chapel of San Damiano, Assisi

The Poor Clares, officially the Order of Saint Clare (Latin: Ordo Sanctae Clarae), originally referred to as the Order of Poor Ladies, and also known as the Clarisses or Clarissines, the Minoresses, the Franciscan Clarist Order, and the Second Order of Saint Francis, are members of an enclosed order of nuns in the Catholic Church. The Poor Clares were the second Franciscan branch of the order to be established. The first order of the Franciscans, which was known as the Order of Friars Minor, was founded by Francis of Assisi in 1209. Three years after founding the Order of Friars Minor, Francis of Assisi and Clare of Assisi founded the Order of Saint Clare, or Order of Poor Ladies, on Palm Sunday in the year 1212. They were organized after the manner of the Order of Friars Minor and before the Third Order of Saint Francis was founded. As of 2011, there were over 20,000 Poor Clare nuns in over 75 countries throughout the world. They follow several different observances and are organized into federations.

The Poor Clares follow the Rule of St. Clare, which was approved by Pope Innocent IV on the day before Clare's death in 1253. The main branch of the order (OSC) follows the observance of Pope Urban. Other branches established since that time, who operate under their own unique Constitutions, are the Colettine Poor Clares (PCC) (founded 1410), the Capuchin Poor Clares (OSCCap) (founded 1538) and the Poor Clares of Perpetual Adoration (PCPA) (founded 1854).

== Foundation and rule ==
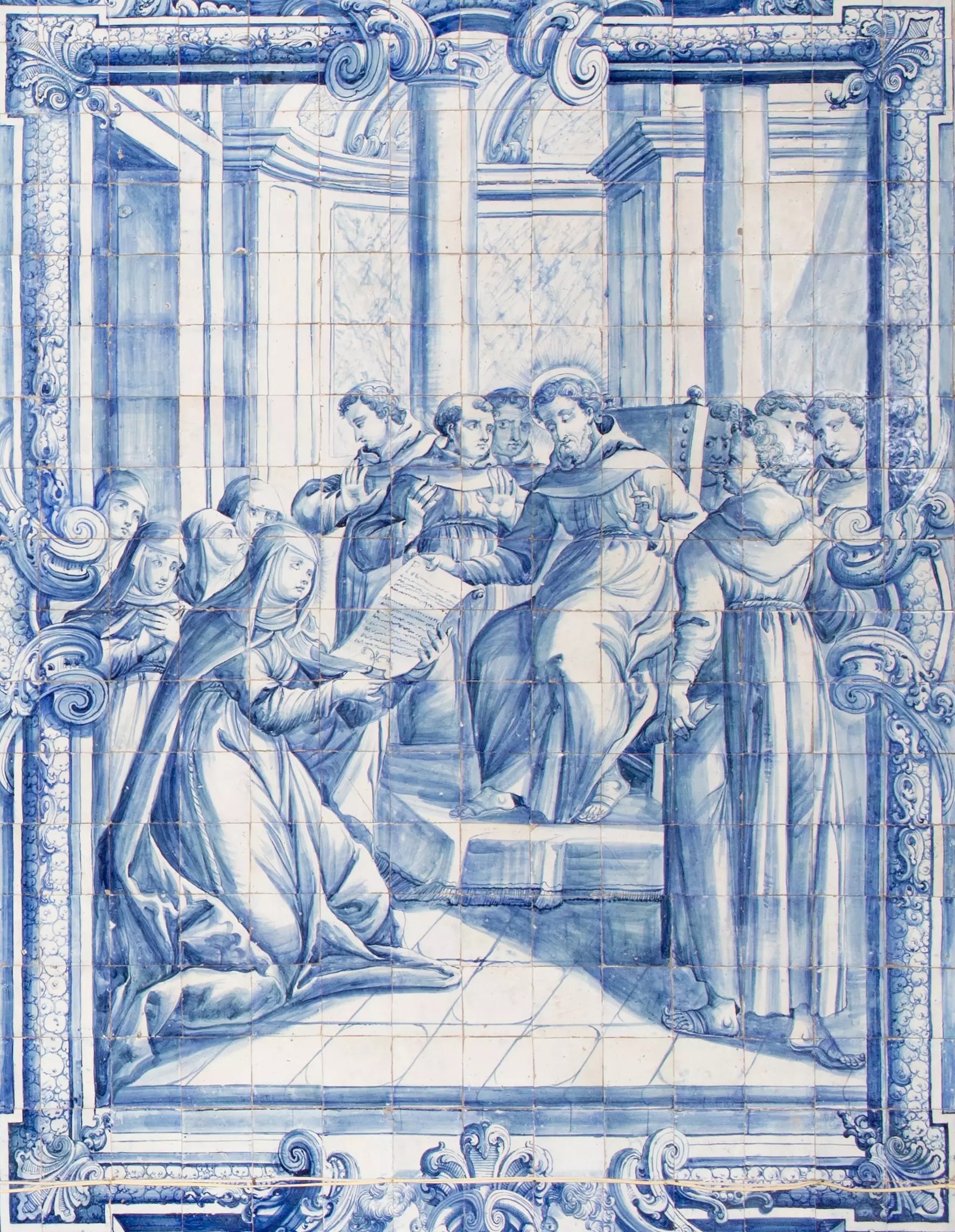
Saint Clare receives the Formula Vitae ("little rule") from Francis of Assisi. 18th-century azulejo panel in the Convent of Louriçal, Portugal.

The Poor Clares were founded by Clare of Assisi in 1212. Little is known of Clare's early life, although popular tradition suggests that she came from a fairly well-to-do family in Assisi. At the age of 17, inspired by the preaching of Francis of Assisi in Assisi Cathedral, Clare ran away from home to join his community of friars at the Portiuncula, some distance outside the town. According to tradition, Clare's family wanted to take her back by force, but Clare's dedication to holiness and poverty inspired the friars to accept her resolution. She was given the habit of a nun and transferred to Benedictine monasteries, first at Bastia and then at Sant' Angelo di Panzo, for her monastic formation. Though some doubted her ability to become a nun, Francis of Assisi encouraged her on her journey. St. Francis believed that women, as well as men, had the capacity to completely forgo ordinary pleasures and live in poverty and did not seek to limit them in this regard based on their gender. This shared belief of both Francis of Assisi and Clare of Assisi would lead them to form the Order of St. Clare: an order of women, dedicated to living an oath of poverty and service, just as the Order of Friars Minor, formed by St. Francis three years prior.

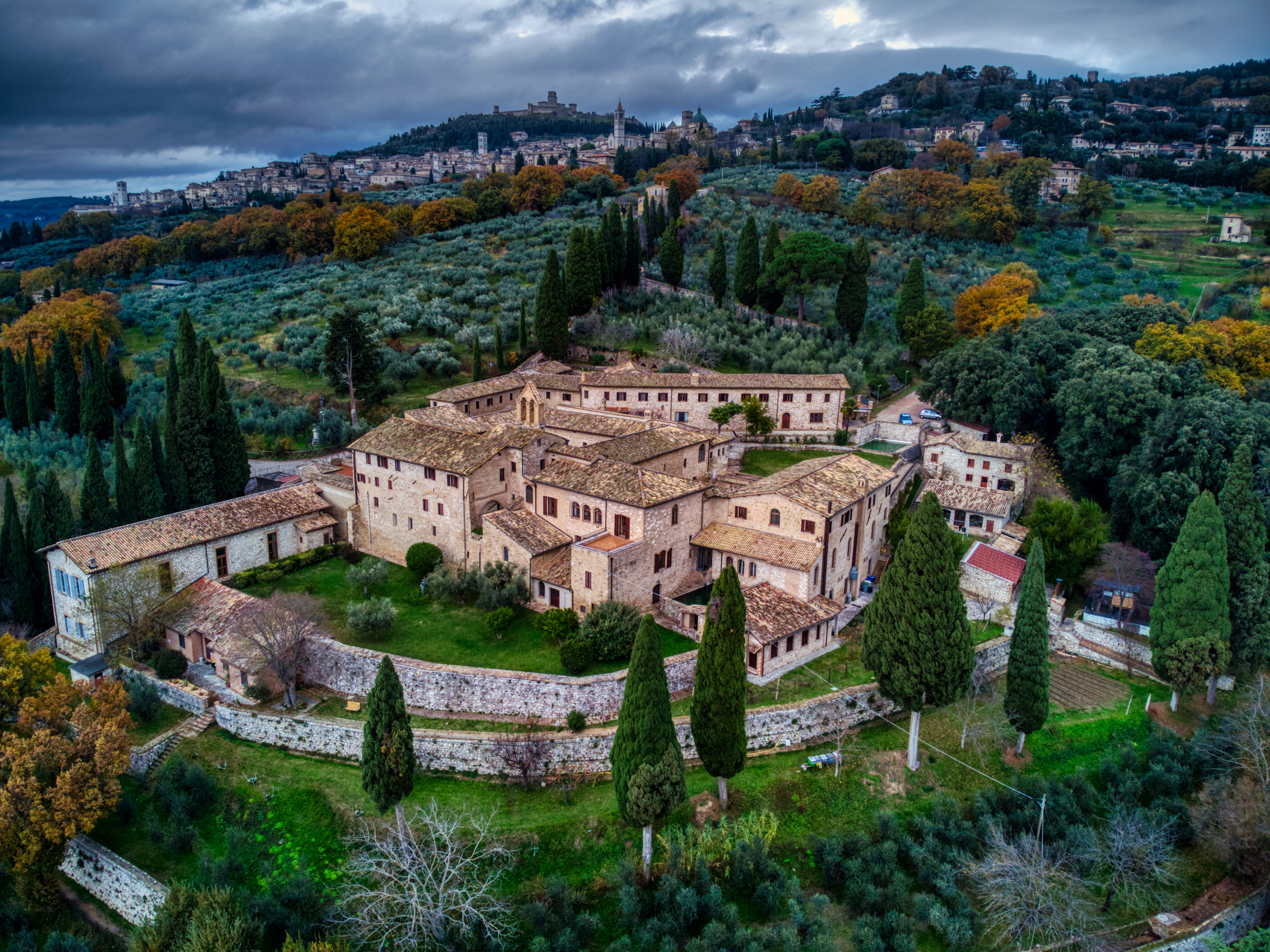
San Damiano in Assisi

By 1216, Francis was able to offer Clare and her companions a monastery adjoining the chapel of San Damiano where she became abbess. Clare's mother, two of her sisters and some other wealthy women from Florence soon joined her new order. Clare dedicated her order to the strict principles of Francis, setting a rule of extreme poverty far more severe than that of any female order of the time. Clare's determination that her order not be wealthy or own property and that the nuns live entirely from alms given by local people was initially protected by the papal bull Privilegium paupertatis, issued by Pope Innocent III. By this time the order had grown to number three monasteries.

== Spread of the order ==
The movement quickly spread, though in a somewhat disorganized fashion, with several monasteries of women devoted to the Franciscan ideal springing up elsewhere in Northern Italy. At this point Ugolino, Cardinal Bishop of Ostia (the future Pope Gregory IX), was given the task of overseeing all such monasteries and preparing a formal Monastic Rule. Although monasteries at Monticello, Perugia, Siena, Gattajola and elsewhere adopted the new rule – which allowed for property to be held in trust by the papacy for the various communities – it was not adopted by Clare herself or her monastery at San Damiano. Ugolino's Rule, originally based on the Benedictine one, was amended in 1263 by Pope Urban IV to allow for the communal ownership of property, and was adopted by a growing number of monasteries across Europe. Communities adopting this less rigorous rule came to be known as the Order of Saint Clare (OSC) or the Urbanist Poor Clares.

Clare herself resisted the Ugolino Rule, since it did not closely enough follow the ideal of complete poverty advocated by Francis. On 9 August 1253, she managed to obtain a papal bull, Solet annuere, establishing a rule of her own, more closely following that of the friars, which forbade the possession of property either individually or as a community. Originally applying only to Clare's community at San Damiano, this rule was also adopted by many monasteries. Communities that followed this stricter rule were fewer in number than the followers of the rule formulated by Cardinal Ugolino, and became known simply as "Poor Clares" (PC) or Primitives. Many sources before 1263 refer to them as Damianites (after San Damiano).

The situation was further complicated a century later when Colette of Corbie restored the primitive rule of strict poverty to 17 French monasteries. Her followers came to be called the Colettine Poor Clares (PCC). Two further branches, the Capuchin Poor Clares (OSCCap) and the Alcantarines, also followed the strict observance. The later group disappeared as a distinct group when their observance among the friars was ended, with the friars being merged by the Holy See into the wider observant branch of the First Order.

The spread of the order began in 1218 when a monastery was founded in Perugia; new foundations quickly followed in Florence, Venice, Mantua, and Padua. Agnes of Assisi, a sister of Clare, introduced the order to Spain, where Barcelona and Burgos hosted major communities. The order then expanded to Belgium and France, where a monastery was founded at Reims in 1229, followed by Montpellier, Cahors, Bordeaux, Metz, and Besançon. A monastery at Marseille was founded directly from Assisi in 1254. The Poor Clares monastery founded by Queen Margaret in Paris, St. Marcel, was where she died in 1295. King Philip IV and Queen Joan founded a monastery at Moncel in the Beauvais diocese. By A.D. 1300 there were 47 Poor Clare monasteries in Spain alone.

The growth the Poor Clare community was experiencing would not last long. Plagues and wars would soon devastate Europe from the 1340s and onward. Plagues such as the Black Death alone would kill up to 20 million people in Europe. In addition, there would be many different military conflicts that would also affect the Poor Clares, such as The Hundred Years’ War that would start in 1337 and go to 1453. Due to the extreme loss of life from both sickness and war, many religious communities were forced to rebuild and recruit more people to the order.

The Poor Clares were a part of this and would have to redefine who they were and who they would let into the order as they were eager to build it back up. For example, prior to both The Hundred Years’ War and the Black Plague in 1330, The Poor Clares had around 80 women who were a part of the order in Toulouse, France. However, by 1370, The Poor Clares’ would only have four women who were still a part of the order. This would lead them to evacuate to local towns and start recruiting individuals to the order. Not all the people who were recruited by the Poor Clares during this time were willing to embrace vows of abstinence, poverty, or obedience. This would bring conflict within the order as there wasn’t unity in the standards that were once the foundation of what the Poor Clares stood for. This would lead to several reform movements, such as the one spearheaded by Juan the 1st.

=== Europe ===
==== United Kingdom ====
The first Poor Clare monastery in England was founded in 1286 in Newcastle upon Tyne. In medieval England, where the nuns were known as "minoresses", their principal monastery was located near Aldgate, known as the Abbey of the Order of St Clare. The order gave its name to the still-extant street known as Minories on the eastern boundary of the City of London.

After the dissolution of the monasteries under King Henry VIII, several religious communities formed in continental Europe for English Catholics. One such was a Poor Clare monastery founded in 1609 at Gravelines by Mary Ward. Poor Clare nuns from Walloon Convent and eight English women, one of whom being Mary Ward, rented a place in town until the convent was completed. The convent was completed in 1609 and provided a permanent place for the nuns to live until 1626 when a fire destroyed most of the building and forced the nuns to seek temporary shelter until it was repaired. Disaster struck again in 1654 when an explosion destroyed almost all of the town, including the convent.

Later expelled from their monastery by the French Revolutionary Army in 1795, the community eventually relocated to England. They settled first in Northumberland, and then in 1857 built a monastery in Darlington, which was in existence until 2007.

Following Catholic emancipation in the first half of the 19th century, other Poor Clares came to the United Kingdom, eventually establishing communities in, e.g., Notting Hill (1857, which was forced to relocate by the local council in the 1960s, and settled in the village of Arkley in 1969), Woodchester (1860–2011), Levenshulme (1863), Much Birch (1880), Arundel (1886), Lynton (founded from Rennes, France, 1904–2010s), Woodford Green (1920–1969), York (1865–2015) and Nottingham (1927–2023).

The community in Luton was founded in 1976 to meet a shortage of teachers for local Catholic schools. It was originally based at 18 London Road in a large Edwardian house. In 1996, the community refocused on a ministry of social work and prayer, and moved to a smaller, modern home at Abigail Close, Wardown Park.

==== Germany ====
With the Reformation, nuns in Catholic monasteries in Germany would be forced to leave their convents and return to family or other networks.

==== Ireland ====
The Poor Clares Order is the longest-surviving female religious community in Ireland. As of 2024, the Poor Clares celebrated their 382nd anniversary of being in Ireland. In Ireland there are seven monasteries of the Colettine Observance. The community with the oldest historical roots is the monastery on Nuns' Island in Galway, which traces its history back to the monastery in Gravelines. The community has a rare book collection which is the most comprehensive single collection of early-modern Clarissan material in English in the world.

It was an English woman, popularly known as the Venerable Mary Ward, who founded a convent of English Poor Clares in Gravelines France in the 17th century. Women from different countries would come and seek admission there. One of them was a young woman, known as Marianna Cheevers, who sought admission into the abbey in 1619. Marianna was a young Irish woman from Wexford, and she became the first Irish Poor Clare since the Reformation. She was professed in December of 1620 and was followed by four other woman from Ireland. Two of the women who joined her were daughters of Viscount Dillon, one of whom was Cisly Dillon, and the other two were Alse Nugent from Westmeath and Mary Doudal from Dublin. By May of 1625, all five of them would be professed and become the first five Poor Clares from Ireland since the Reformation. The five women were determined to start a convent that was exclusively Irish and selected Cisly Dillon, daughter of Theobald Dillon, 1st Viscount Dillon, to be their abbess, even though she was only 22 at the time.

On May 20, 1625, they would arrive at the town of Dunkirk, which was only 14 miles from Gravelines, and was located on the coast in the Low Countries. The Low Countries would have been swarming with the Irish at that time. As the Irish fought in almost all the Spanish wars as mercenaries from 1587 to 1814, in fact, in 1585, Queen Elizabeth pledged to help the protestant Dutch fight for their independence from the Spanish Catholics and sent over 500 Irish Catholics to fight. When the Irish and their English Colonel William Stanley, who was also catholic, found out that they had been sent to fight the Spanish Catholics, they quickly changed sides in the conflict and paved the way for thousands of other Irish people to come and fight for the Spanish. It was soldiers like these that Cisly and the others hoped to help. People like Owen Roe O’Neil, a famous soldier and leader in Irish history, would have been around the Low Countries at this time. Other Irish men like Owen, grew up in places like the Spanish Netherlands and the Low Countries (located north of France) and would not return to Ireland unless brought back by fellow insurgents or family members still living in Ireland. In other words, the Low Countries and the Spanish Netherlands were full of Irish Catholics.

As all five of the women had connections among Irish officers, it is unsurprising that they wanted to form a convent in the Low Countries. What is surprising is the courage they exercised as they had no money. They hoped to survive on the money they received with alms, but their alms were not enough. Unable to make the high rent, they were forced to leave after eighteen short months and moved to a town called Nieuport, which was just further up the coast close to Ostend. Since most of their donations came from Ireland and the war was going on, they had little to nothing to etch out a living. Since Charles the 1st was now king, they wondered if they should return to Ireland. Communities that had been shut down after the Reformation were being restored by the Irish Franciscans. Though Charles the 2nd would have had a greater impact in the restoration of Catholicism than Charles the 1st, if only for the fact that he enjoyed a longer reign as monarch of England than his father.

In June of 1629, the Poor Clares finally arrived in Ireland, and the five nuns settled in Dublin. They set up a convent on Merchants’ Quay and received twelve novices, out of whom they professed six. Everything was going well until on February 24, 1630 an order from England came to close all religious houses. They managed to remain hidden until October 22, 1630, when they were apprehended by authorities. As they were being marched off, people in the street saw them in their habits and started a riot to free them. Abbess Cisly was able to quiet the mob, and after being interrogated by authorities, the women were allowed to leave and given orders to dissolve the convent and told to leave Dublin within the month.

They separated into groups of two to avoid attention, and the young Abbess Cisly went to her father’s estate and found a piece of land that was away from the public. The nuns named it Bethlehem, as they would take shelter here, just as Christ Jesus took shelter in the stable following his birth. They lived there in peace for over a decade and were renowned for their piety. After some time, they built a nunnery in Drogheda and started to grow in numbers. Though those ten years were a blessing of peace, unrest would plague them again. Persecution under the Penal Laws and the Irish rebellion would lead to the destruction of their monastery and would leave them with no choice but to dissolve for a time. Many of them took refuge in Dublin and eventually formed a convent there and that community would become one of the oldest communities in Ireland. Originally a separate community of Irish women under a common mother superior with the English nuns, they moved to Dublin in 1629, the first monastic community in Ireland for a century. The first Abbess was Cisly Dillon, a daughter of Theobald Dillon, 1st Viscount Dillon.

War forced the community to move back to Galway in 1642. From that point on, persecution under the Penal Laws and war led to repeated destruction of their monastery and scattering of the community over two centuries, until 1825, when fifteen nuns were able to re-establish monastic life permanently on the site.

Later monasteries were founded in 1906 in both Carlow and Dublin. From these, foundations were established in Cork (1914) and Ennis (1958). In 1973, an enclosed community of nuns of the Franciscan Third Order Regular in Drumshanbo, founded in England in 1852 and established there in 1864, transferred to the Second Order, under this Observance.

There is Poor Clares monastery in Faughart, County Louth.

==== Continental Europe ====
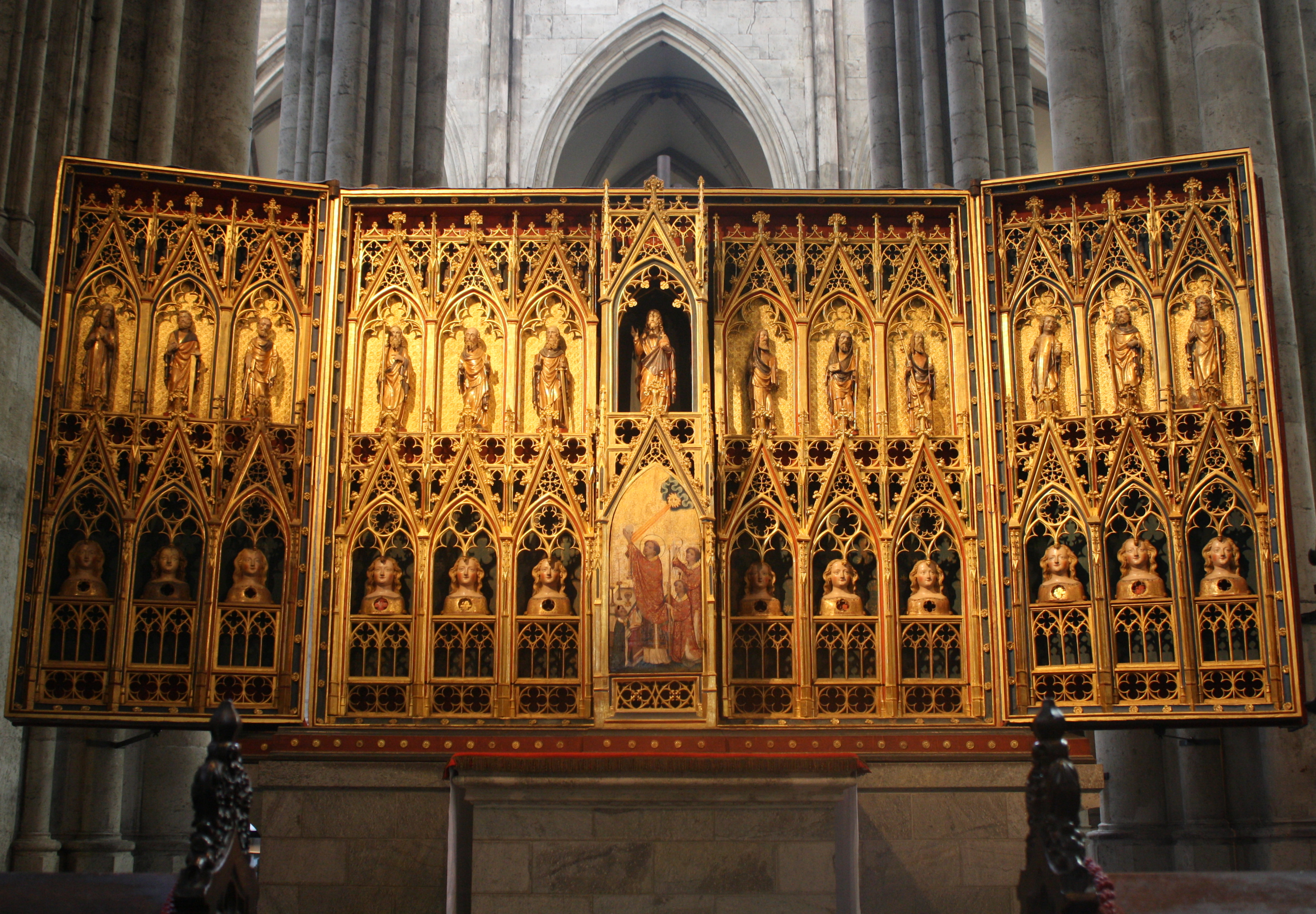
Gothic altar in Cologne Cathedral dedicated to Poor Clare saints

Currently there are communities of Colettine Poor Clares in Bruges, Belgium, as well as in Eindhoven, the Netherlands, and in Larvik, Norway. There are several monasteries in Hungary, Lithuania and Poland of the Urbanist and Capuchin Observances.

There are notable Clarissine churches in Bamberg, Bratislava, Brixen, and Nuremberg. There also is a small community in Münster, Germany, and a Capuchin monastery in Sigolsheim, France.

The last six Poor Clare nuns from a convent in Belgium were able to sell their convent by selling luxury vehicles, and move to the South of France.

The Convent of Saint Clare is located in Burgos, Spain. A Poor Clares convent in Belorado ran into conflicts with the Vatican in the 2020s, and ten of their members were excommunicated. The Nuestra Señora de los Huertos convent in Siguenza hosts a Poor Clares community.

==== France ====
There would be six different attempts at establishments in Toulouse, a city in France, as people kept reforming the order. After the Black Plague and different wars in Europe, the Poor Clares in Toulouse went from a group of around 80 women to a group of 4. As they regrouped and converted people to the order, the remaining sisters ran into a problem. Not all of the people who joined the Poor Clares were willing to take vows of abstinence, obedience, and poverty. There eventually came a Tordesillas reform, which was spearheaded by Juan 1st. This reform gained traction, and other monasteries ended up combining with it and forming the Santa Maria la Real or Santa Clara de Tordesillas. Eventually, though, they would be brought under the review of the Observant provincial vicar, and some would be forced to comply with violence. It is because of this dissent that the Colettine Reform movement happened.

Colette was born in 1381, and when her parents died when she was seventeen, she sold all her possessions and took personal vows of poverty. People such as Jean Pinet and Henry of Baume would point her toward the Franciscan order. Colette would later record receiving visions about the need to restore the vows of poverty to the Franciscan order. In 1406, she received aid from different noble women such as Blanche of Geneva and the pope, who would give her permission to establish a community that emphasized the ideals of poverty, as long as it was along the lines of what Clare of Assisi had tried to do so long ago. Pope Urban IV would end up changing the name of the order to the Order of St. Claire in 1263 as a tribute to her

=== Americas ===
==== United States ====
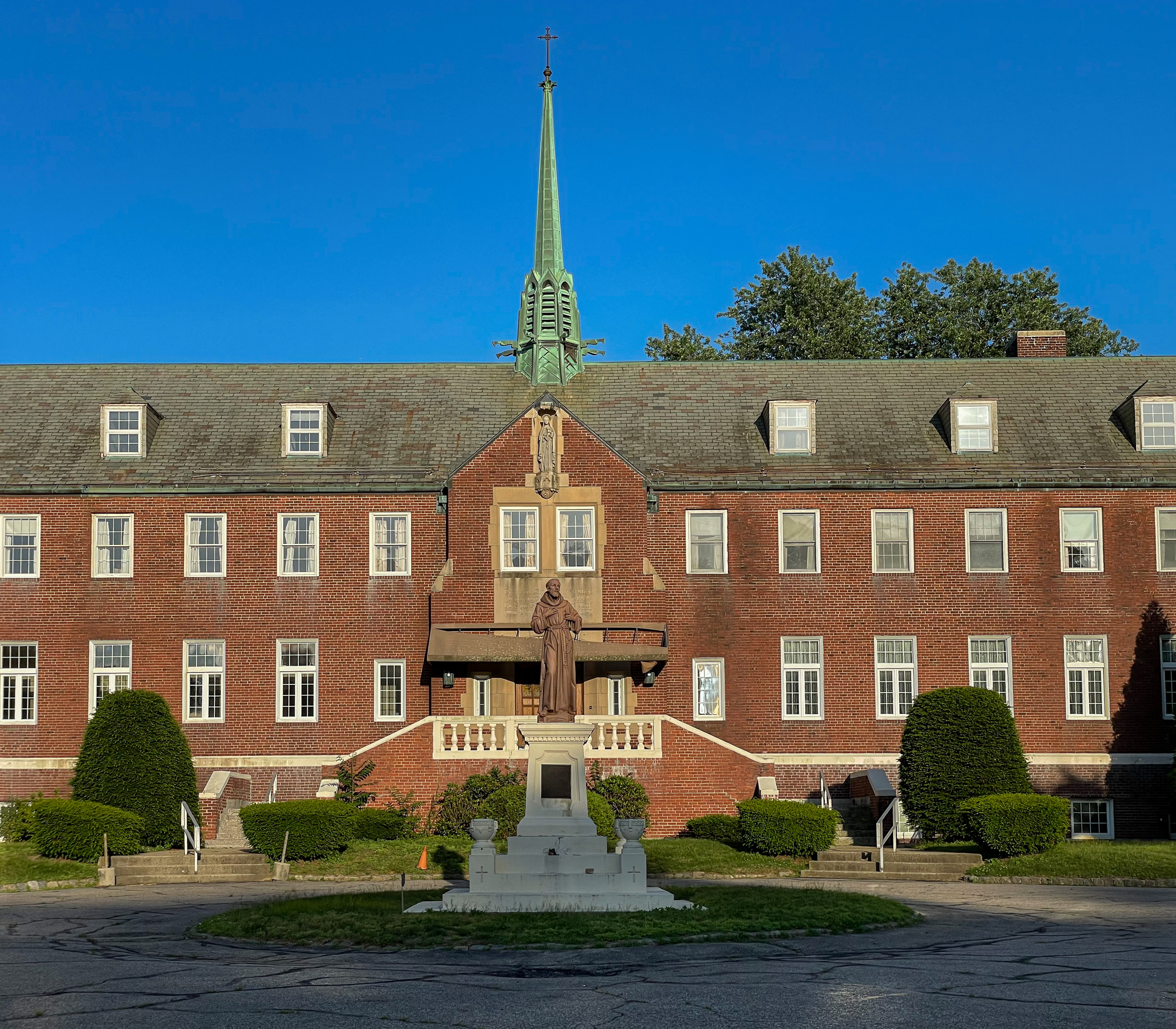
The (former) Poor Clare Monastery in Jamaica Plain, Boston

After an abortive attempt to establish the order in the United States in the early 1800s by three nuns who were refugees of Revolutionary France, the Poor Clares were not permanently established in the country until the late 1870s.

A small group of Colettine nuns arrived from Düsseldorf, Germany, seeking a refuge for the community which had been expelled from their monastery by the government policies of the Kulturkampf. They found a welcome in the Diocese of Cleveland, and in 1877 established a monastery in that city. At the urging of Mary Ignatius Hayes in 1875 Pope Pius IX had already authorized the sending of nuns to establish a monastery of Poor Clares of the Primitive Observance from San Damiano in Assisi. After the reluctance on the part of many bishops to accept them, due to their reliance upon donations for their maintenance, a community was finally established in Omaha, Nebraska, in 1878.

Currently there are also monasteries in (among other places): Alexandria, Virginia (PCC); Andover, Massachusetts; Belleville, Illinois (PCC); Bordentown, New Jersey; Boston, Massachusetts; Brenham, Texas; Chicago, Illinois; Cincinnati, Ohio; Cleveland, Ohio (OSC, PCC and PCPA); Fort Wayne, Indiana; Evansville, Indiana; Kokomo, Indiana; Los Altos Hills, California; Memphis, Tennessee; metropolitan Richmond, Virginia; New Orleans, Louisiana; Philadelphia, Pennsylvania; Phoenix, Arizona; Rockford, Illinois (PCC); Roswell, New Mexico (PCC); Saginaw, Michigan; Spokane, Washington;/ Travelers Rest, South Carolina; Washington D.C.; and Wappingers Falls, New York. Additionally there are monasteries in Alabama (PCPA), California, Florida, Missouri, Montana and Tennessee. Since the 1980s, the nuns of New York City have formed small satellite communities in Connecticut and New Jersey. There is one monastery of the Capuchin Observance in Denver, Colorado, founded from Mexico in 1988.

==== Canada ====
There are three monasteries of the order in Canada: St. Clare's Monastery at Duncan, British Columbia; and at Mission, British Columbia; and a French-speaking community in Valleyfield, Quebec.

==== Latin America ====
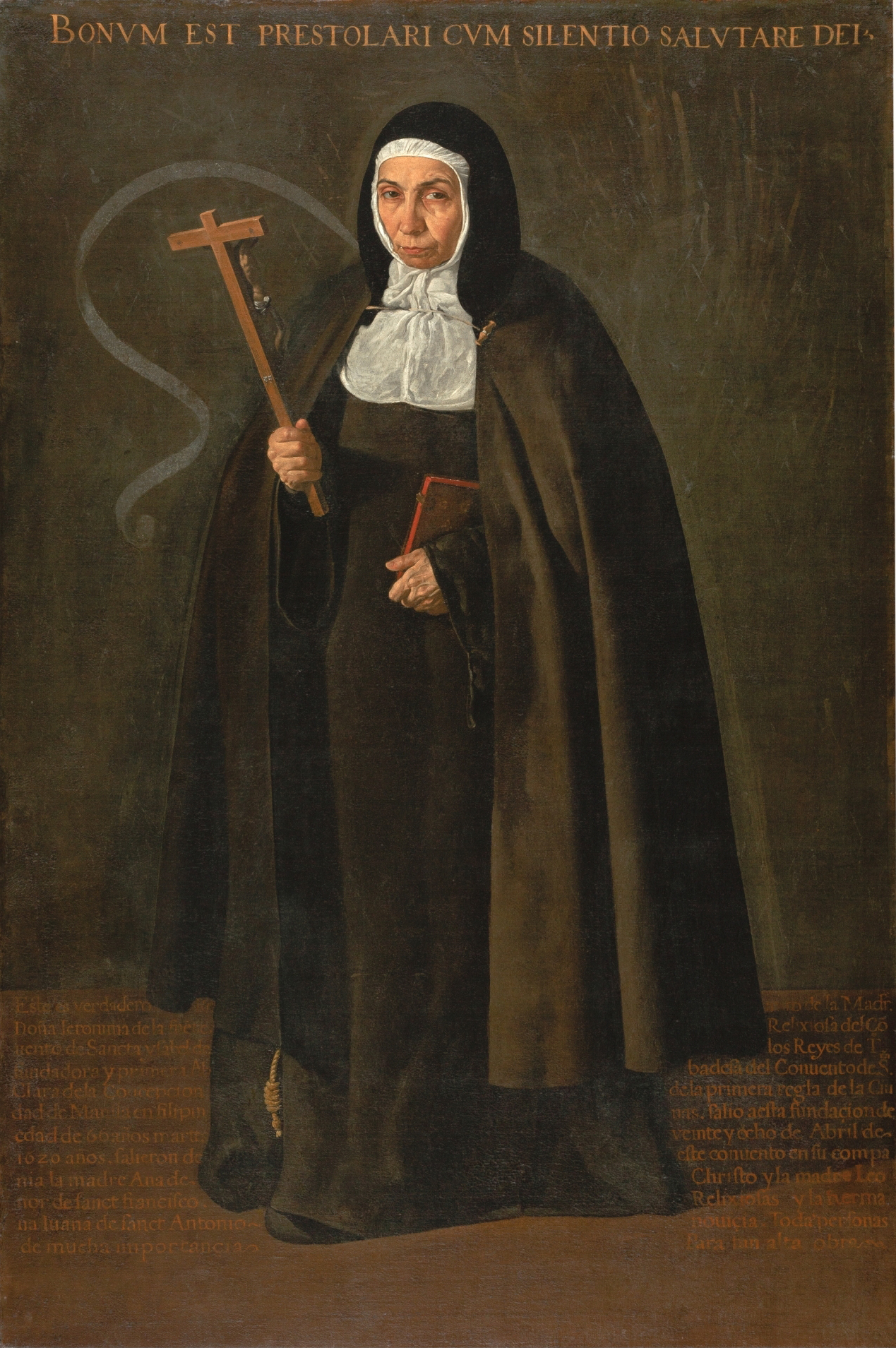
Mother Jeronima of the Assumption, PCC, by Diego Velázquez (1620)

There have been monasteries of the order in Mexico since colonial days. The Capuchin nuns alone number some 1,350 living in 73 different monasteries around the country.

A monastery was founded in Huehuetenango, Guatemala, by nuns from the community in Memphis, Tennessee, in November 1981, in the early days of a bloody civil war which ravaged that country; as of 2011, it consisted of seven nuns; five Guatemalans and two Salvadorans.

=== Asia ===
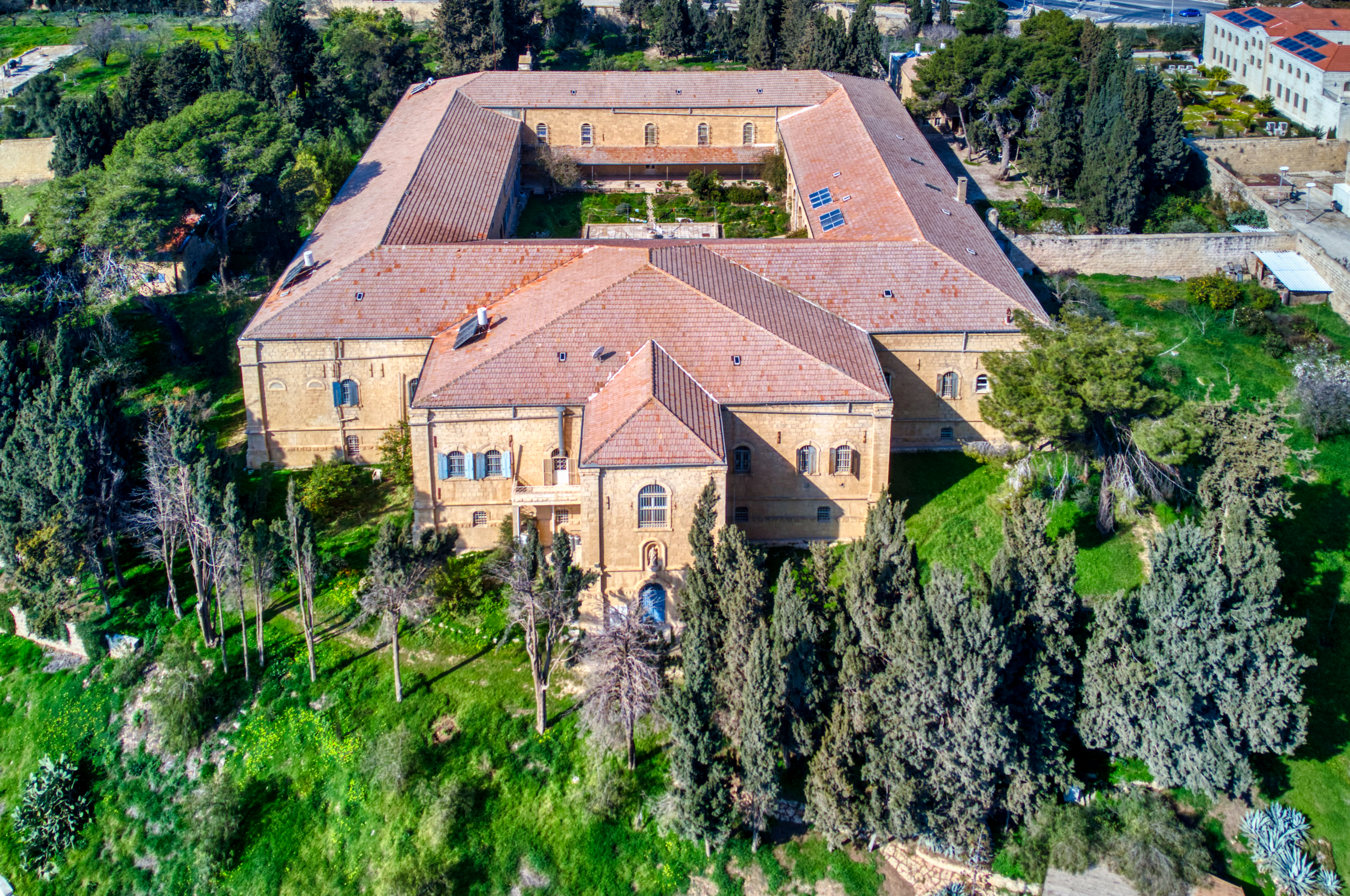
Monastery Saint Claire in Jerusalem

The Poor Clares were massacred at Acre during the reconquest of Palestine after the Crusades. They returned to Nazareth in 1884 and Jerusalem in 1888. St Charles de Foucauld served both communities between 1897 and 1900. These French Clarissians were expelled from the Ottoman Empire at the onset of World War I; the communities were subsequently reestablished in 1949 amid the creation of Israel.

==== Philippines ====
The Poor Clare in the Philippines was led by Jeronima of the Assumption who was authorized by the King of Spain and the Minister General of the Order of Friars Minor to go there to found a monastery. She was from Toledo, Spain and left Madrid in April 1620 in her 60s and arrived in Manila on 5 August 1621 with other 14 sisters. They are the first contemplative nuns who arrived in the Philippine archipelago to support the active works of evangelization of the Franciscans working in the country through their life of contemplation, penance, poverty, and enclosure.

Together with the Alcantarine Friars who came to the Philippines in 1578 and strive to live the ideals of Francis of Assisi in a very rigorous way, the Poor Clare sisters also professed the Rule and life of Clare of Assisi. They heightened their witnessing of the "privilege of poverty" of Clare by not having a permanent income but rather opened their gates of the Divine Providence through alms and the generosity of the people.

Their Monastery in Intramuros was severely devastated by an earthquake. However, through the efforts of the people around, it was rebuilt and has a larger space compared to the former monastery. During the war for independence in the year 1945, the monastery was destroyed again and the sisters were forced to evacuate the place. For the meantime, they were sheltered at the Minor Seminary of the Franciscans in San Francisco del Monte, Quezon City for 5 years. The present location of the Monastery is at Aurora Boulevard, C5, Katipunan, Quezon City. Because of the zeal for the contemplative life, the founder's cause is ongoing for beatification.

Apart from the said monastery, it also expand its presence from the different parts of the country. The country has 27 monasteries in total: Sariaya Quezon (1957); Calbayog, Samar (1965); Betis and Guagua, Pampanga (1968); Cabuyao, Laguna and Tayud, Cebu (1975): Maria, Siquijor and Isabela, Basilan in (1986); Josefina, Zamboanga del Sur, (1989); Kidapawan, North Cotabato, Balanga Bataan, Lopez (Quezon Province), and Cabid-an, Sorsogon (1990); Guibang, Isabela, Mondragon, Northern Samar and Naval, Biliran (1991); Iguig, Tuguegarao (1992); Bolinao, Pangasinan and Cantilan, Surigao del Sur (1993); Boac, Marinduque and Polomolok, South Cotabato (1998); Aritao, Nueva Vizcaya (1999); Tabon-tabon, Albay and San Jose, Antique (2004); Borongan, Eastern Samar and Malasiqui Pangasinan (2011) and Tabuk, Kalinga (2017). The Poor Clare Monastery in Palawan province is founded by the Monastery from China.

Furthermore, their expansion does not only limit in the Philippine archipelago but also helped the aging communities in Tahiti, France, Italy, England, Germany, Egypt, USA. They were able to found new monasteries in abroad such as in Malaysia, Papua New Guinea, Taiwan, Hongkong.

There are also monastery from Kiryū, Gunma, Japan, which was founded from the monastery in Boston in 1965.

== Saints, Blesseds, Venerables, and Servants of God ==
Saints

- Chiara Offreduccio d'Assisi (16 July 1194 – 11 August 1253), one of the first followers of Francis of Assisi and founder of the Order, canonized on 26 September 1255
- Agnese d'Assisi (c. 1197 or 1198 – 16 November 1253), one of the order's first abbesses and younger sister of Saint Claire of Assisi, canonized on 15 April 1752.
- Anežka Přemyslovna (Agnes of Bohemia) (20 January 1211 – 2 March 1282), Bohemian princess and abbess, canonized on 12 November 1989
- Kinga (Cunegunda) of Poland (5 March 1224 – 24 July 1292), Grand Duchess of Poland who later became a nun, canonized on 16 June 1999
- Caterina de' Vigri da Bologna (8 September 1413 – 9 March 1463), writer, teacher, mystic, and artist, canonized on 22 May 1712
- Eustochia Smeralda Calafato (25 March 1434 – 20 January 1485), abbess, canonized on 11 June 1988
- Camilla Battista da Varano (9 April 1458 – 31 May 1524), princess and abbess, canonized on 17 October 2010

Blesseds

- Filippa Mareri (c. 1190-1200 - 16 February 1236), nun, beatified on 30 April 1806
- Elena Enselmini da Arcella (c. 1208 - 4 November 1242), nun, beatified on 29 October 1695
- Salomea of Poland (c. 1211/1212 – c. 1268), Queen of Halych who later became a nun, beatified on 17 May 1673
- Margherita Colonna (c.1259 – 30 December 1284), nun, beatified on 17 September 1847
- Jolanta of Poland (c. 1235 – 11 June 1298), Polish nun, beatified on 26 September 1827
- Mattia de Nazarei (1 March 1253 – 28 December 1319), nun, beatified on 27 July 1765
- Petronilla de Troyes/de Moncel (died 1 May 1335), French abbess, beatified on 11 May 1854
- Felicia Meda (c. 1378 - 30 September 1444), abbess, beatified on 2 May 1807
- Antonia da Firenze (c. 1401 - 29 February 1472), abbess, beatified on 17 September 1847
- Ludovica di Savoia (28 December 1461 – 24 July 1503), nun, beatified on 12 August 1839
- Paola Montaldi (c. 1443 - c. 1514), abbess, beatified on 6 September 1866
- Marguerite de Lorraine (c. 1463 - 2 November 1521), Duchess of Alençon who later became a nun, beatified on 20 March 1921
- Elisabetta Maria (Maria Crocifissa) Satellico (31 December 1706 – 8 November 1745), professed religious, beatified on 10 October 1993
- Anne-Joseph (Marie-Joséphine) Leroux (23 January 1747 - 23 October 1794), Martyr of the French Revolution and also a professed religious from the Ursulines, beatified on 13 June 1920
- Jeanne-Germaine Castang (Marie-Céline of the Presentation) (24 May 1878 – 30 May 1897), French professed religious, beatified on 16 September 2007
- Isabel (of Saint Raphael) Aranda Sánchez (c. 1899 - 13 January 1937), Martyr of the Spanish Civil War from the Diocese of Jaen, promulgation of decree on martyrdom on 20 June 2025 and is currently awaiting beatification
- Manuela de Jesús Arias Espinosa (María Inés Teresa of the Blessed Sacrament) (7 July 1904 – 22 July 1981), founder of the Poor Clare Missionaries of the Blessed Sacrament and the Missionaries of Christ for the Universal Church, beatified on 21 April 2012

Declared Blessed by popular acclaim

- Ortolana (12th century – 2 January 1238), mother of Saints Claire and Agnes, who later joined the Order and became a nun
- Lucia da Valcaldara (c. 1370 - 12 January 1430), professed religious
- Mascalda Romano Colonna Calafato (C. 1407 – 17 October 1482), widow and mother of Saint Eustochia Calafato, who, after listening to a sermon by Blessed Matteo da Agrigento, inspired her to join the religious life
- Illuminata Bembo (c. 1410 – 18 May 1496), abbess and friend of Saint Catherine of Bologna
- Costanza Riccardi (c. 1451 – after 1500?), professed religious

Venerables

- Maria Agnese (Antonia Maria) Belloni (5 November 1635 - 11 January 1719), professed religious, declared Venerable on 4 February 1899
- Angiola Maria (Chiara Isabella) Gherzi (25 October 1742 - 27 October 1800), professed religious, declared Venerable on 13 November 1894
- Coloma Antònia Martí Valls (Francesca of the Wounds Of Jesus) (26 June 1860 - 4 June 1899), professed religious, declared Venerable on 19 May 2018
- Zeinab Alif (Maria Giuseppina Benvenuti) (c. 1845 or 1846 - 24 April 1926), Sudanese professed religious, declared Venerable on 27 June 2011
- María Amparo Delgado García (María Amparo of the Sacred Heart) (30 October 1889 - 6 July 1941), professed religious, declared Venerable on 2 July 1994
- Vincenza Damato (Maria Chiara of Saint Therese of the Child Jesus) (11 November 1909 - 9 March 1948), professed religious, declared Venerable on 2 April 2011
- Juana de la Concepción Sánchez García (Clara of the Conception) (14 February 1902 - 22 January 1973), professed religious, declared Venerable on 3 April 2014
- María Natividad Sánchez Villoria (María Francisca of the Child Jesus) (25 December 1905 - 28 February 1991), professed religious, declared Venerable on 2 October 2019

Servants of God

- Agnes von Wittelsbach (or von Bayern) (c. 1335 or 1345 - 11 November 1352), professed religious
- Claire (Bonne) d’Armagnac (23 February 1434 - 3 January 1457), nun
- Barbara von Bayern (9 June 1454 - 24 June 1472), nun
- Camilla Pio di Savoia (c. 1440 - 15 April 1504), professed religious and abbess, declared as Servant of God on 8 January 2001
- Ana (of the Cross) Ponce de León (3 March 1527 - 26 April 1601), professed religious
- Jerónima (of the Assumption) Yáñez de la Fuente (9 May 1555 – 22 October 1630), founder of the Real Monasterio de Santa Clara (Royal Monastery of Saint Clare) in Intramuros, Manila, Philippines
- Maria (of the Sacred Side) Brites Rego (24 June 1605 - 13 April 1632), professed religious
- Santa (Cecilia) Nobili (13 February 1630 - 24 July 1655), professed religious
- Bernardina Floriani (Giovanna Maria of the Cross) (8 September 1603 - 26 March 1673), professed religious
- Honorada Caterina Margarida (Anna Maria) Antigó (19 January 1602 - 28 September 1676), professed religious
- Isabella d’Amato (Chiara of Jesus) (14 March 1618 - 6 July 1693), professed religious
- Catalina (of Saint Matthew of the Conception) de Balboa Ugarte (30 April 1648 - 26 May 1695), professed religious
- Vitória (of the Incarnation) Nabo Correia Bixarxe (6 March 1661 - 19 July 1715), Brazilian professed religious, declared as Servant of God on 7 July 2016
- Rosalia Flaminia Ansalone (Febronia Ferdinanda of Jesus) (16 June 1657 - 23 September 1718), professed religious
- Teresa de Jesus do Rego Quintanilha (Teresa da Anunciada) (14 March 1658 - 16 May 1738), professed religious
- Anna (Chiara Isabella) Fornari (25 June 1697 - 9 December 1744), professed religious
- Maria Vittoria (Maria Lanceata) Morelli (c. 1704 - 26 August 1762), professed religious, declared as Servant of God on 6 November 2002
- Maria Luisa Biagini (14 March 1770 - 29 March 1811), professed religious
- Maria Antonia (Maria Cira) Destro (11 March 1782 - 24 July 1818), professed religious, declared as Servant of God on 28 November 2019
- Theresia Steiner (Maria Agnese Chiara of the Sacred Side of Jesus) (9 August 1810 - 24 August 1862), professed religious
- Maria Concetta Saraceni (Maria Cherubina Chiara of Saint Francis) (8 December 1823 - 1 February 1871), professed religious
- Isabel Juliana (of the Blessed Sacrament) García-Suelto Pantoja (19 November 1832 - 5 July 1902), professed religious, declared as Servant of God on 29 January 2002
- Anna Bentivoglio (Maria Maddalena of the Sacred Heart of Jesus) (29 July 1824 - 18 August 1905), professed religious
- Ludwika Morawska (Maria of the Cross) (22 August 1842 - 26 January 1906), professed religious, declared as Servant of God on 24 September 2002
- Virgínia (of the Passion) da Silva (24 October 1860 - 17 January 1929), professed religious, declared as Servant of God on 26 October 2006
- Antonia (María of Beautiful Love) Meco Pérez (10 March 1864 - 1 September 1936), Martyr of the Spanish Civil War, declared as a Servant of God on 6 September 2016
- Elisa López Lobelle (Carmen of the Child Jesus) (8 April 1905 - 24 September 1936), Martyr of the Spanish Civil War, declared as a Servant of God on 27 September 2016
- María Concepción Vila Hernández and 2 Companions (died between 8 September to 2 October 1936), Martyrs of the Spanish Civil War, declared as Servants of God on 4 July 1998
- María Antonia (of Saint Raphael) Pascau Castán and 2 Companions (died 2 October 1936), Martyrs of the Spanish Civil War
- María de la Concepción Sánchez Marqués (Teresa of Jesus) (c. 1878 - 25 November 1936), Martyr of the Spanish Civil War, declared as a Servant of God on 21 March 2006
- Louisa Jaques (Mary of the Trinity) (6 April 1901 - 25 June 1942), professed religious, declared as Servant of God on 14 October 2024
- María (Celina of the Child Jesus) del Carmen García Pomareda (17 February 1910 - 26 November 1962), professed religious, declared as Servant of God on 18 February 2013

== Connections with television ==
- In 1958, Saint Clare was declared the patron saint of television by the Catholic Church.
- The Eternal Word Television Network (EWTN) is operated by the Poor Clares of Perpetual Adoration in Alabama. It is privately owned.
- In June and July 2006, BBC Two broadcast a television series called The Convent, in which four women were admitted to a Poor Clare monastery in southern England, for a period of six weeks, to observe the life.

== See also ==
- Colettine Poor Clares
- Capuchin Poor Clares
- Poor Clares of Perpetual Adoration
