= Sharon Farmer (historian) =

Historian

- Born: April 9, 1952 (age 74)

Academic background
- Education: Harvard University
- Thesis: Societal change and religious expression : Saint Martin's cult at Tours, 1050-1200 (1982)

Sharon Ann Farmer (born April 9, 1952) is an American medievalist and research professor emerita at the University of California, Santa Barbara. She is known for her research into the medieval period, with a focus on women, social, and religious topics.

== Early life, education, and career ==
Farmber was born on April 9, 1952. She received a Ph.D. from Harvard University in 1983. She worked at the University of California, Santa Barbara. Farmer retired at the end of the 2019 academic year.

== Works ==
Farmer is known for her work in medieval women and gender, medieval towns, medieval poor, and relations between Western Europe and the east. Farmer's essay, "Merchant Women and the Administrative Glass Ceiling in Thirteenth Century Paris", shows her using methods such as looking into tax assessments from medieval Paris to provide evidence towards her point. In her work "Global and Gendered Perspectives on the Production of a Parisian Alms Purse" in the Journal of Medieval Worlds, Farmer worked with professionals in textile analysis and chemical analysis to determine the makeup of the Parisian alms purse she was researching.

== Honors and awards ==
In 2005, Farmer was awarded a Guggenheim Fellowship. She was elected a Fellow of the Medieval Academy of America in 2015. She was a EURIAS Fellow at the Institut d’études avancées-Paris from 2013 until 2014.

== Selected publications ==
- Farmer, Sharon A. (1991). Communities of Saint Martin. Ithaca: Cornell University Press. ISBN 978-0-8014-2391-8.
- Farmer, Sharon A.; Pasternack, Carol Braun, eds. (2003). Gender and Difference in the Middle Ages. Minneapolis: U of Minnesota Press. ISBN 978-0-8166-3894-9.
- Farmer, Sharon A. (2005). Surviving Poverty in Medieval Paris. Cornell University Press. ISBN 978-0-8014-7269-5.
- Farmer, Sharon (2017). The Silk Industries of Medieval Paris. Philadelphia: University of Pennsylvania Press. ISBN 978-0-8122-4848-7.
- Bove, Boris (2020). "Review of The Silk Industries of Medieval Paris. Artisanal Migration, Technological Innovation, and Gendered Experience, (The Middle Ages Series)". Medievales (79): 225–228. doi:10.4000/medievales.11147. ISSN 0751-2708. JSTOR 27092802.
- Field, Sean L. (2018). "Review of The Silk Industries of Medieval Paris: Artisanal Migration, Technological Innovation, and Gendered Experience. (The Middle Ages.), Farmer Sharon". Speculum. 93 (3): 836–838. doi:10.1086/698505. ISSN 0038-7134. JSTOR 26584679.
- Hess, Erika E. (2018). "Review of The Silk Industries of Medieval Paris: Artisanal Migration, Technological Innovation, and Gendered Experience". The French Review. 92 (2): 246–247. ISSN 0016-111X. JSTOR 48613392.
