= San Damiano, Assisi =

Church in Assisi, Italy

Coordinates: 43°03′42″N 12°37′05″E

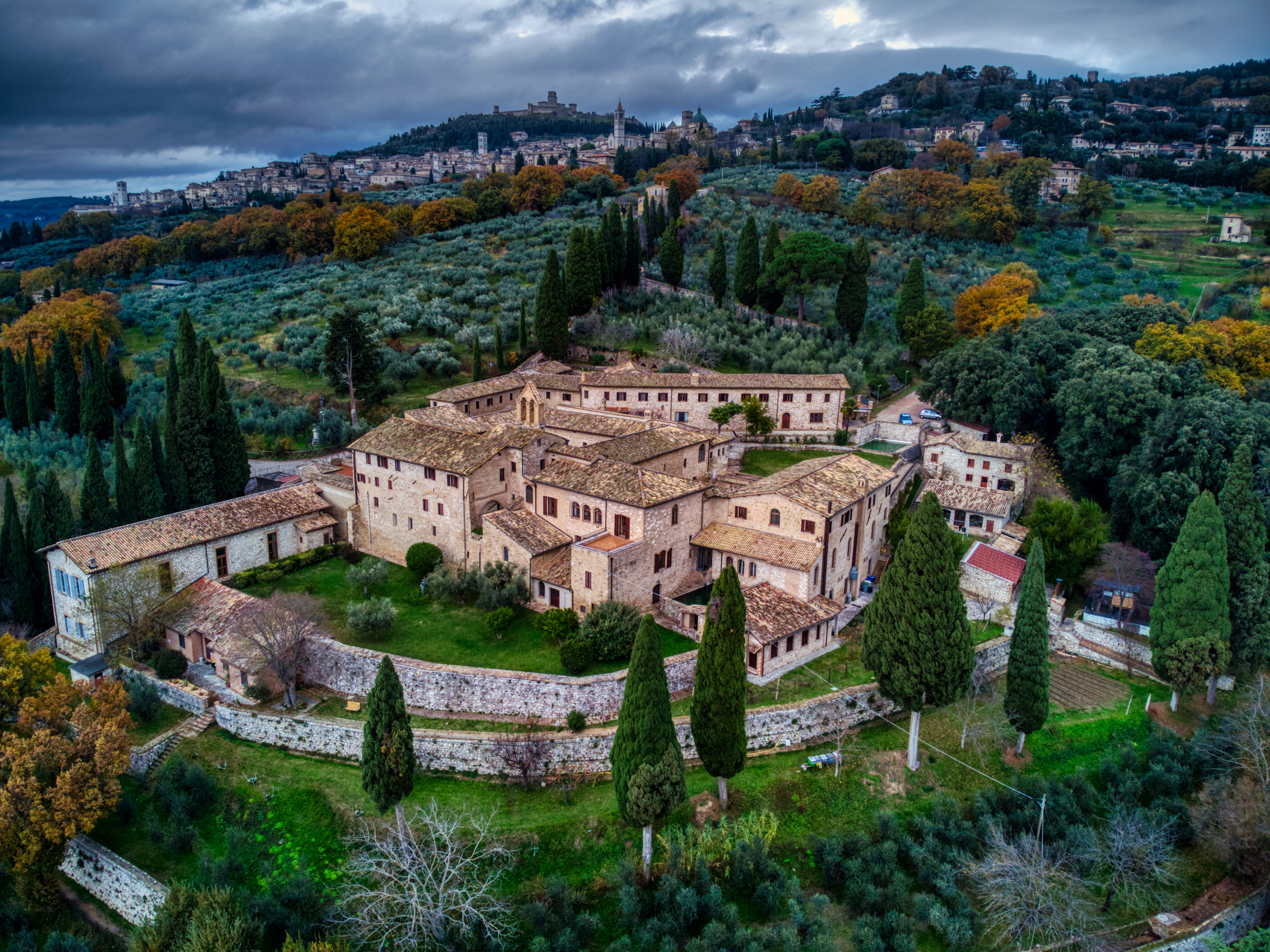
Aerial view of San Damiano complex

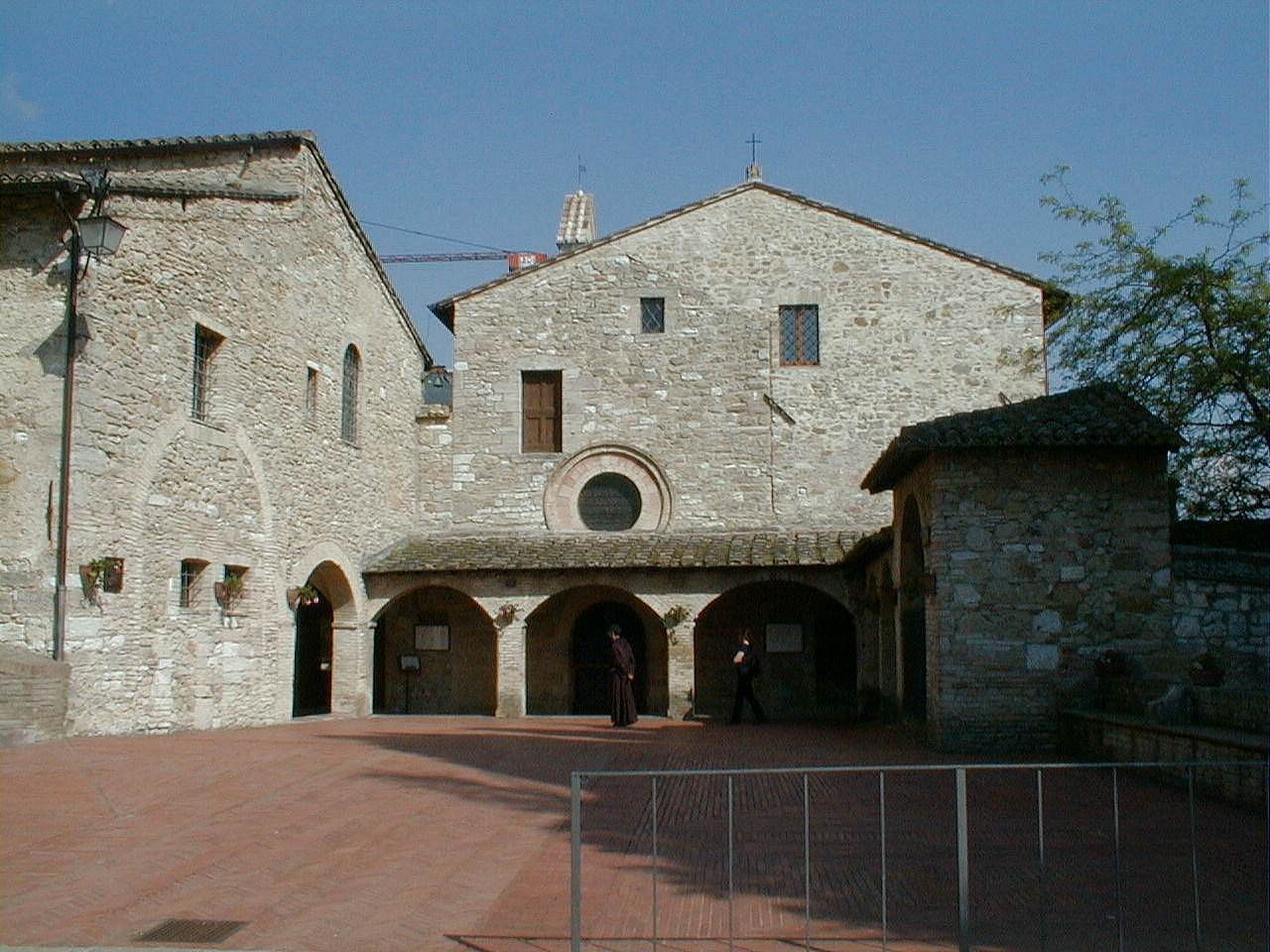
External view of San Damiano complex

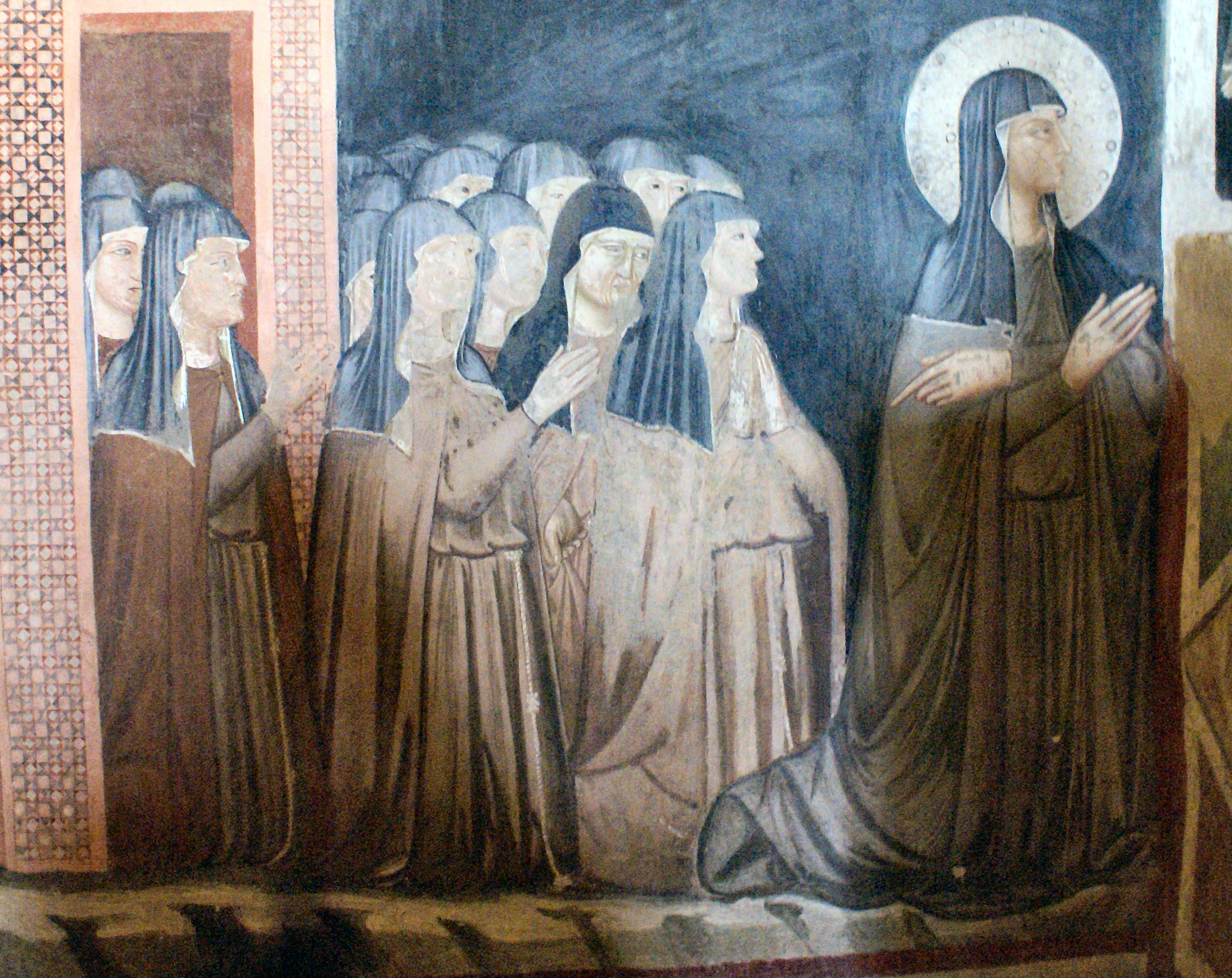
Fresco of Saint Clare and sisters of her order, church of San Damiano, Assisi

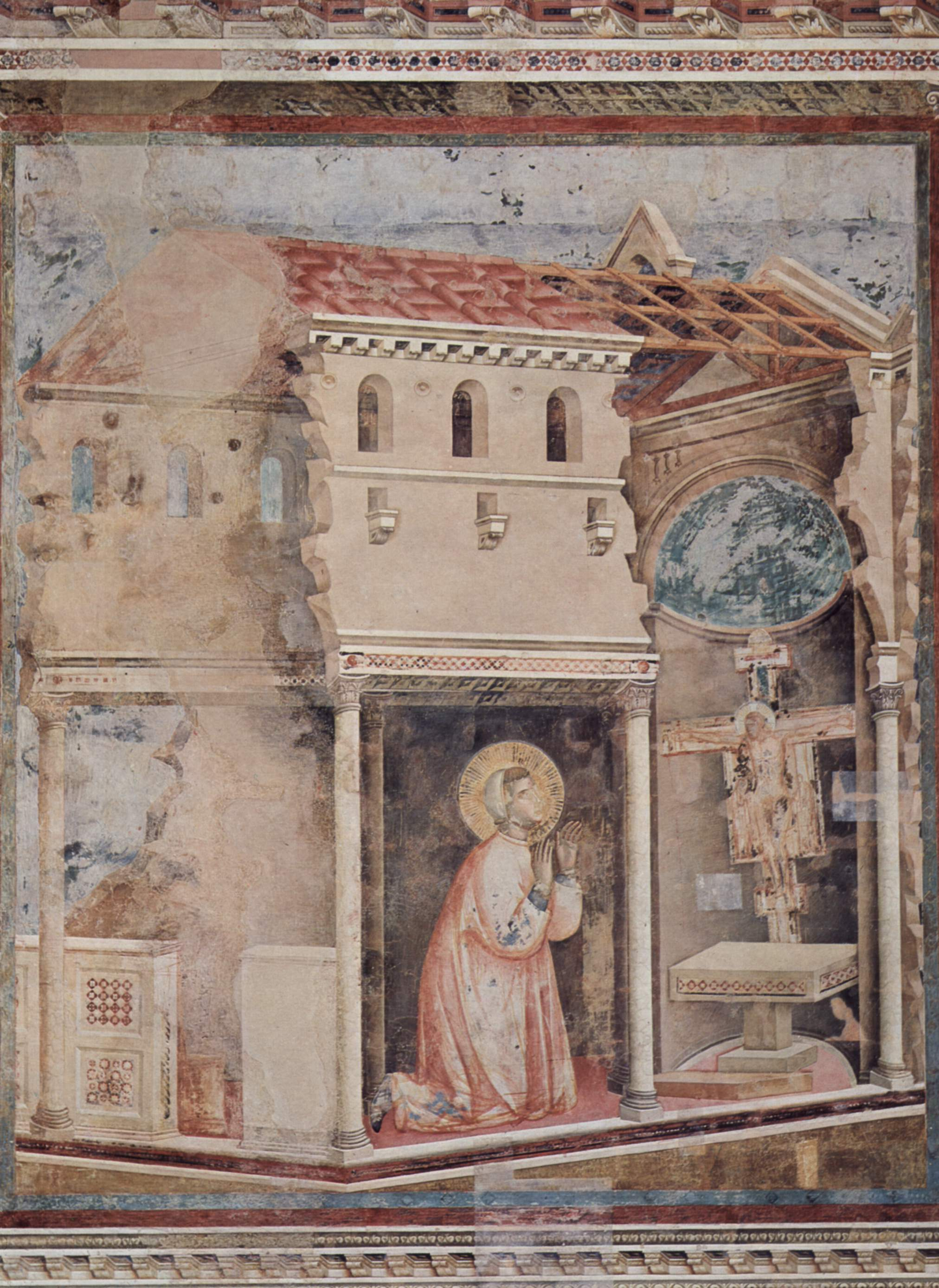
St Francis in San Damiano in the upper church of the Basilica of Saint Francis of Assisi, attributed to Giotto.

San Damiano is a church with a monastery near Assisi, Italy. Built in the 12th century, it was the first monastery of the Order of Saint Clare, where Saint Clare built her community.

The church has a hut-shaped façade; the entrance is preceded by a short portico with three round arcades supported by brickwork pillars. Above the central arch is a circular rose window. The interior has a single nave with ogival barrel vaults. The right wall is home to a rectangular chapel with, at the altar, a wooden crucifix executed by Innocenzo da Petralia in 1637. The nave ends with a deep apse with a modern stone altar, a Baroque wooden tabernacle and the choir.

== Miracle of St Francis at San Damiano ==
According to Franciscan sources, a miracle in which Saint Francis' heard an exhortation from Christ occurred in 1205 in this church:

One day out in the countryside to meditate. Finding himself near San Damiano, which threatened ruin, old as it was, driven by the impulse of the Holy Spirit, he entered to pray. Kneeling in prayer before the image of the Crucifix, he was invaded with a great spiritual consolation and, as he affixed his tearful eyes on the cross of the Lord, with the ears of his body he heard a voice descend to him from the cross and say three times Francis, go and repair my church which, as you see, is all in ruins!. On hearing that voice, Francis remained astonished and trembling, being in the church alone and, perceiving in his heart the power of divine language, felt kidnapped of his senses. Finally returning to his senses, he girded himself to obey, concentrated everything on the mission to repair the church of walls, although the divine word was referring principally to the Church which Christ purchased by his blood, as the Holy Spirit had made him understand and how he later revealed to his fellow brothers.

Afterwards Saint Francis took action to physically repair the structure of the San Damiano church, although he eventually realized that God's message to him was to restore the entire Catholic Church as a whole body rather than literally repair one stone structure. The San Damiano cross which was said to speak to Francis currently hangs in the Basilica of Saint Clare in Assisi.

Other artworks in the church include a 14th-century Madonna with Child between Sts. Damian and Rufinus fresco, located in the apse.

== Convent of Saint Clare ==
This convent became the home of Saint Clare of Assisi and her followers in 1212. Work was carried out to provide buildings for this religious community. The Sisters stayed until Clare's death in 1253 when it was thought too dangerous to remain and it was exchanged with the Canons of San Rufino for the chapel of San Giorgio. The convent is open free of charge to the public. Downstairs off the cloister is the refectory in its original state. A fresco in the refectory recalls the visit of Pope Gregory IX when he asked Clare to bless the loaves, which is said to have resulted in crosses appearing on the loaves. Upstairs is St. Clare's Oratory where the Blessed Sacrament was kept, and next to this is the dormitory. A cross marks the place where Clare died on 11 August 1253.

== Sources ==
- Bellucci, Gualtiero (2005). Assisi, Heart of the World. Assisi: Edizioni Porziuncola.
- Costantino, Troiano; Alfonso Pompei. Illustrated guide of Assisi. Assisi: Casa Editrice Francescana dei Fratei Minori Conventuali.
