= Manuela de Jesús Arias Espinosa =

Mexican Roman Catholic professed religious

Blessed Manuela de Jesús Arias Espinosa MC
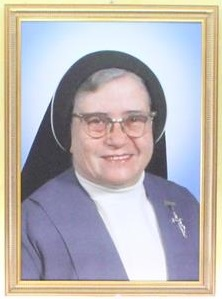

Virgin
- Born: 7 July 1904; Ixtlán del Río, Nayarit, Mexico
- Died: 22 July 1981 (aged 77); Rome, Italy
- Venerated in: Roman Catholic Church
- Beatified: 21 April 2012, Basilica of Our Lady of Guadalupe, Mexico City, Mexico by Cardinal Angelo Amato
- Feast: 22 July

Manuela de Jesús Arias Espinosa (7 July 1904 – 22 July 1981), also known by her religious name María Inés Teresa of the Blessed Sacrament, was a Mexican religious sister in the Roman Catholic Church and the founder of both the Poor Clare Missionaries of the Blessed Sacrament (1945) and the Missionaries of Christ for the Universal Church (1979). She lived during the time of the Cristero War and left the country for some time to avoid the anti-religious persecution at the time.

Espinosa's beatification was celebrated in Mexico on 21 April 2012 with Cardinal Angelo Amato presiding over the celebration on the behalf of Pope Benedict XVI.

== Life ==
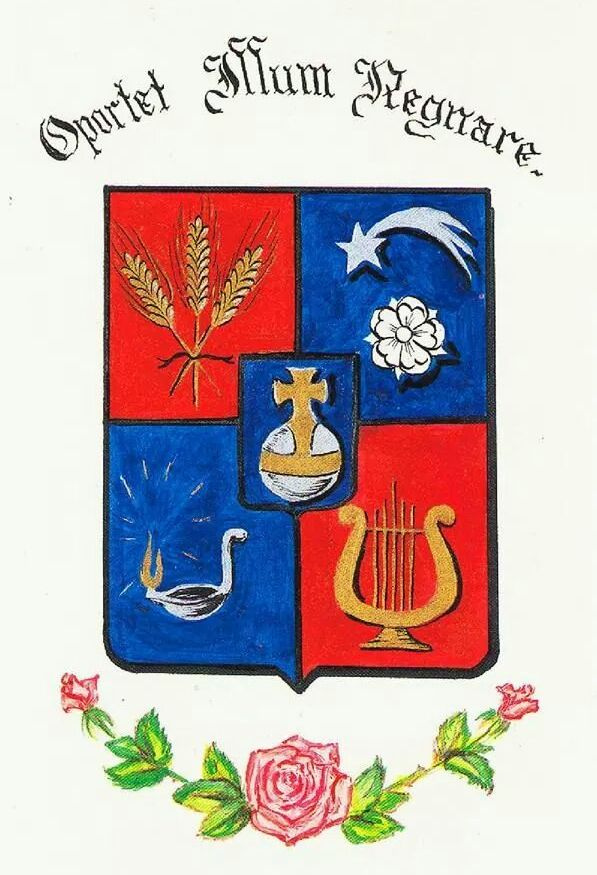
The herald of the Poor Clare order she founded

Manuela de Jesús Arias Espinosa was born in Mexico in 1904 as the fifth of eight children to the pious Eustaquio Arias Arroniz and María Espinosa López Portillo. She made her First Communion in 1911.

Her religious calling blossomed in 1924 after attending a religious congress from 5–12 October 1924 and received inspiration after reading an account of Saint Thérèse of Lisieux. But her firm decision to enter the religious life did not come until the Feast of Christ the King in 1926.

Espinosa entered the Ave Maria" convent in Los Angeles on 5 June 1929. Espinosa made her initial vows on 12 December 1930. She made her perpetual vows on 14 December 1933 and took the religious name María Inés Teresa of the Blessed Sacrament; she lived cloistered until 1949. On 23 August 1945 Espinosa founded the Poor Clare Missionary Sisters of the Blessed Sacrament in Cuernavaca in Morelos and received the papal decree of praise in 1949 and the full approval of Pope Pius XII on 22 June 1951.

Her next and final order founded was titled the Missionaries of Christ for the Universal Church and was established on 23 November 1979 in Nievo León. On 9 December 1980 she had an audience with Pope John Paul II in Rome.

Espinosa died in Rome in 1981. Over six thousand of her spiritual writings still remain. Her first order now operates in places such as Ireland and Indonesia while the second operates in Sierra Leone.

== Beatification ==
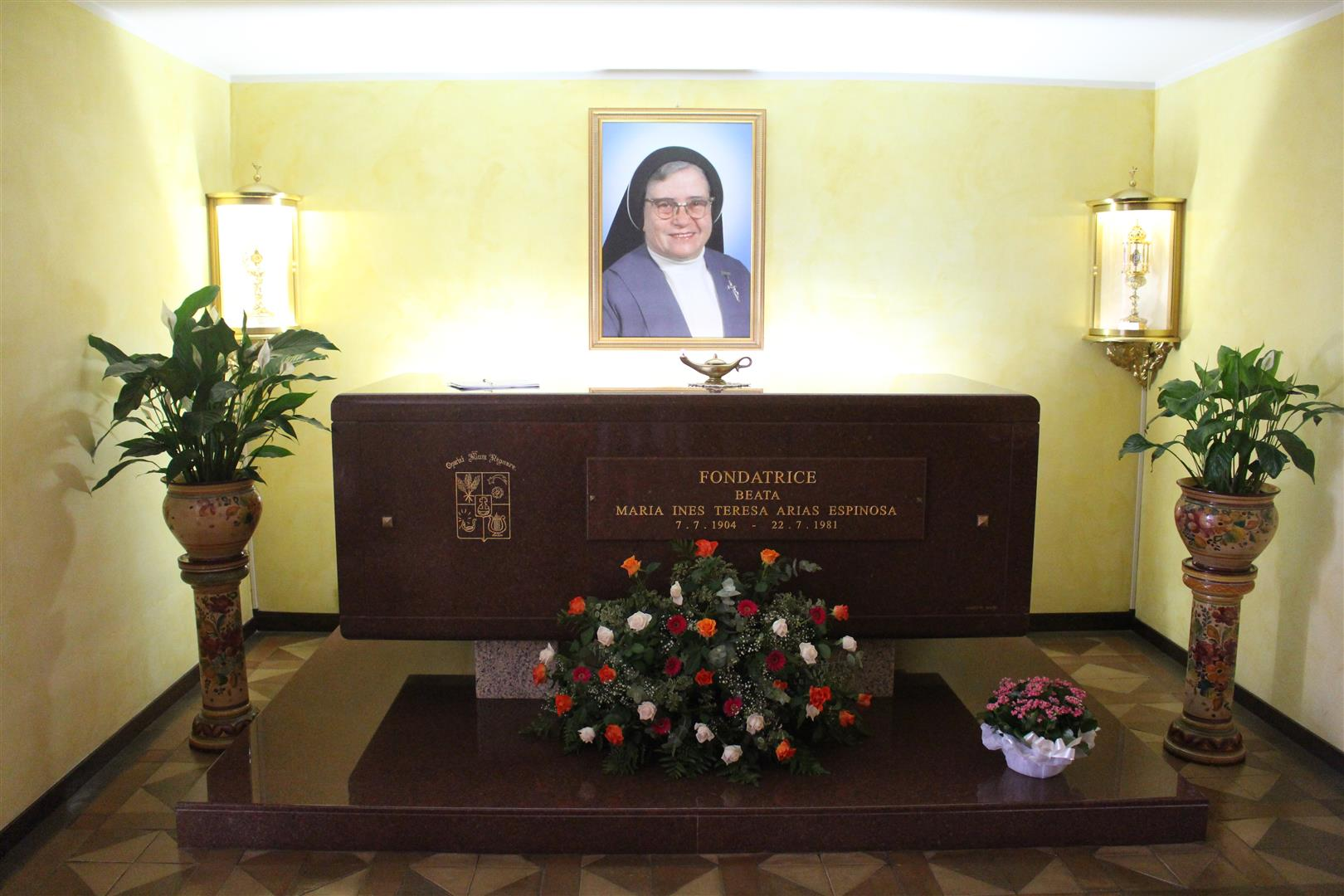
Tomb

The beatification process first had to receive the decree that transferred the competent forum from the Diocese of Rome on 20 March 1992 that led to her being titled as a Servant of God on 1 December 1992 under Pope John Paul II once the Congregation for the Causes of Saints granted the official nihil obstat ("nothing against") to the cause. The diocesan process that opened in Cuernavaca spanned from 31 October 1992 until 15 October 1996 while Cardinal Camillo Ruini inaugurated another process in Rome that spanned from 25 March 1994 until 26 June 1996. Roman officials validated the diocesan process on 25 October 1997.

The official dossier – known as the Positio – came into the possession of Roman officials in 1999 while a group of theologians voted in favor just under a decade later on 26 September 2008 while the cardinal and bishop members of the C.C.S. voted also to approve the contents of the dossier in a meeting of 17 February 2009. Espinosa was proclaimed to be Venerable on 3 April 2009 after Pope Benedict XVI confirmed that the late religious had lived a model Christian life of heroic virtue.

The process for the investigation of an alleged miracle opened in Guadalajara on 26 October 2002. The miracle in question involved the 2001 healing of the child Francisco Javier Carrillo Guzmán who had drowned in his pool. The medical board voted in favor of the miracle on 27 May 2010 while a board of theologians followed suit on 15 January 2011; the Congregation for the causes of Saints voted in favor of the miracle as well on 21 June 2011 and passed it onto Benedict XVI on 27 June 2011 for his approval.

Espinosa's beatification was celebrated on 21 April 2012 in Mexico. The delegate that presided at the beatification was Cardinal Angelo Amato while Guzmán – whose miracle led to the beatification – presented the relics at the celebration. The apostolic nuncio to Mexico Christophe Pierre and Cardinal Norberto Rivera Carrera were also in attendance. The postulator is Sr. Silvia Burnes Sánchez.
