= Basilica di Santa Chiara =

Church in Assisi, central Italy

Coordinates: 43°04′08″N 12°37′01″E

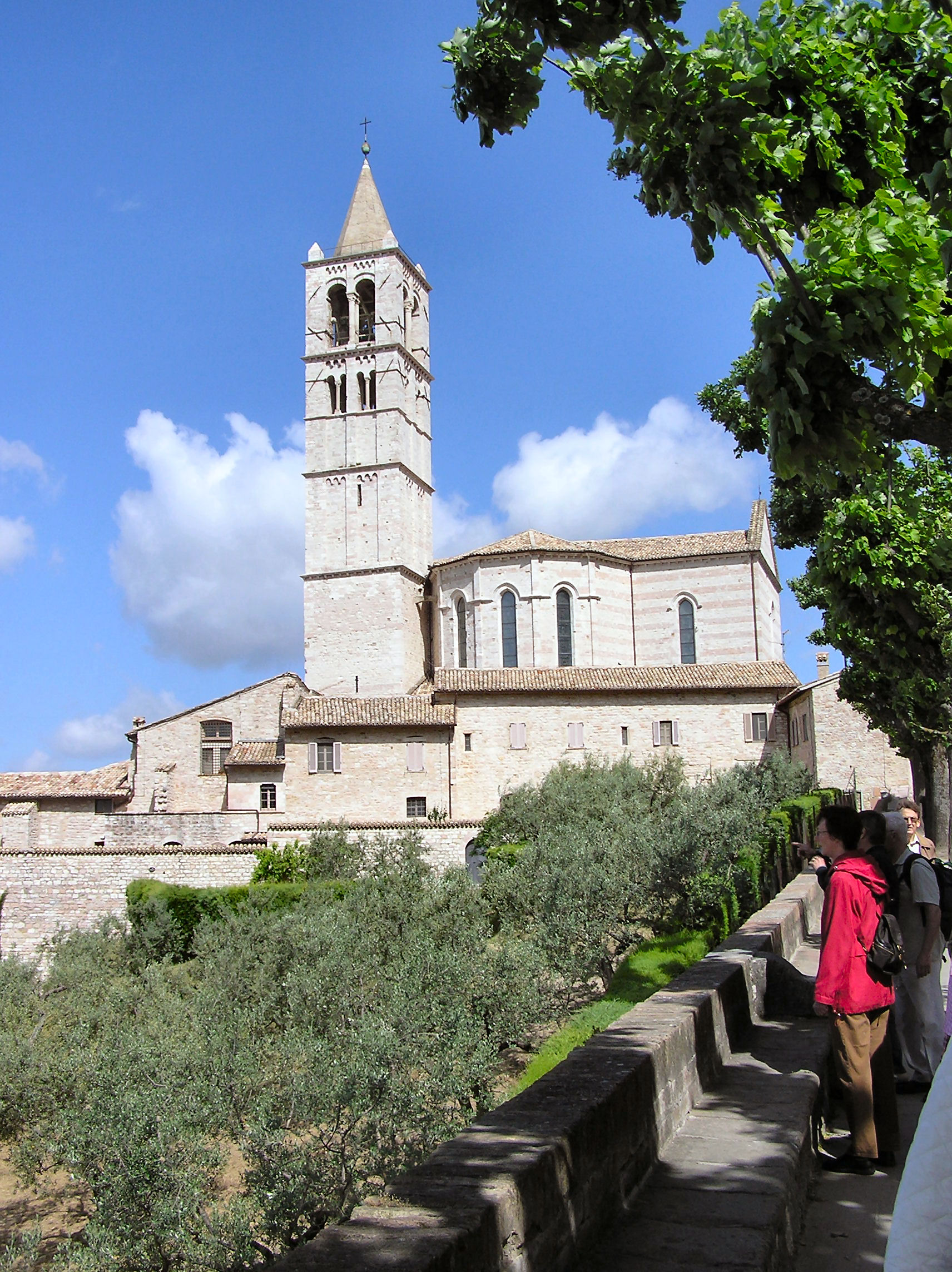
View of the basilica complex

The Basilica of Saint Clare of Assisi (Italian: Basilica di Santa Chiara d'Assisi) is a church in Assisi, central Italy. It is dedicated to and contains the remains of St. Clare of Assisi, a follower of St. Francis of Assisi and founder of the Order of Poor Ladies, known today as the Order of Saint Clare.

== Construction ==
Construction of the church began under the direction of Filippo Campello, one of the foremost architects of the time. On 3 October 1260, the remains of Saint Clare were transferred from the chapel of San Giorgio to the newly built Basilica of Saint Clare, where they were interred beneath the high altar. The duomo features an outstanding Romanesque façade.

== Discovery of remains ==
Like the body of Saint Francis, the remains of Saint Clare lay hidden for six centuries before being rediscovered in 1850 after a prolonged search. On 23 September of that year, the coffin was unearthed and opened. Although the saint's flesh and clothing had decayed to dust, her skeleton was found to be perfectly preserved.

On 29 September 1872, Clare's bones were solemnly transferred by Archbishop Pecci—who would later become Pope Leo XIII—to a specially constructed shrine in the crypt of the Basilica of Saint Clare, where they remain visible to this day.

The Feast of Saint Clare is celebrated throughout the Catholic Church on 11 August. The feast of her first translation is observed by the religious order on 3 October, while the feast of the finding of her body is kept on 23 September.

Agnes of Assisi is also buried here.

== Gallery ==
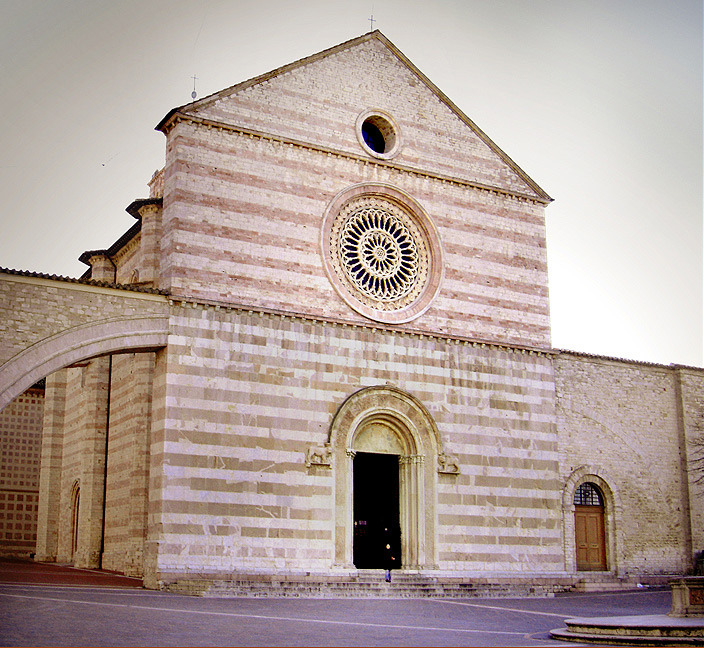
Façade

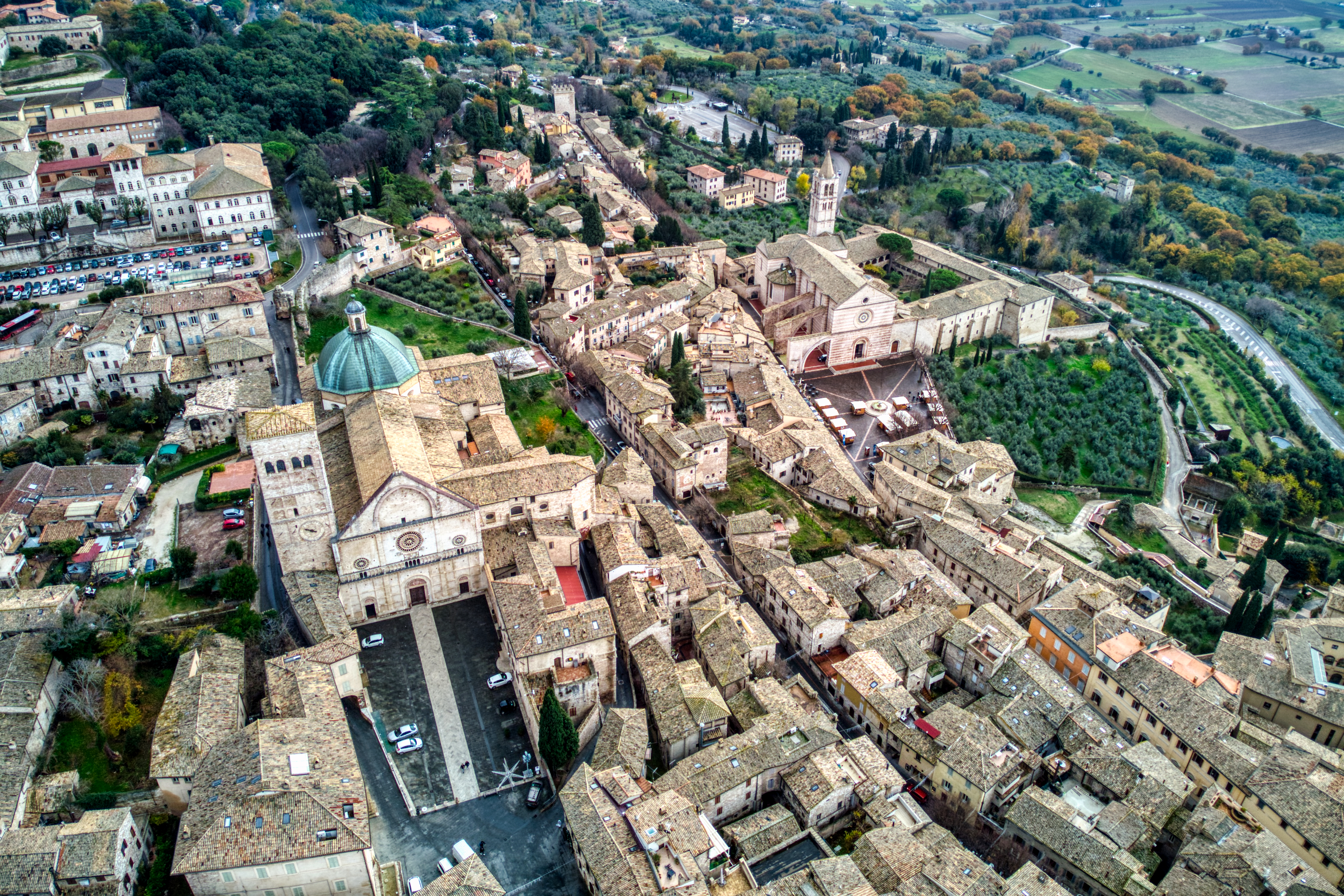
The basilica vicinity in Assisi, just below the Assisi Cathedral

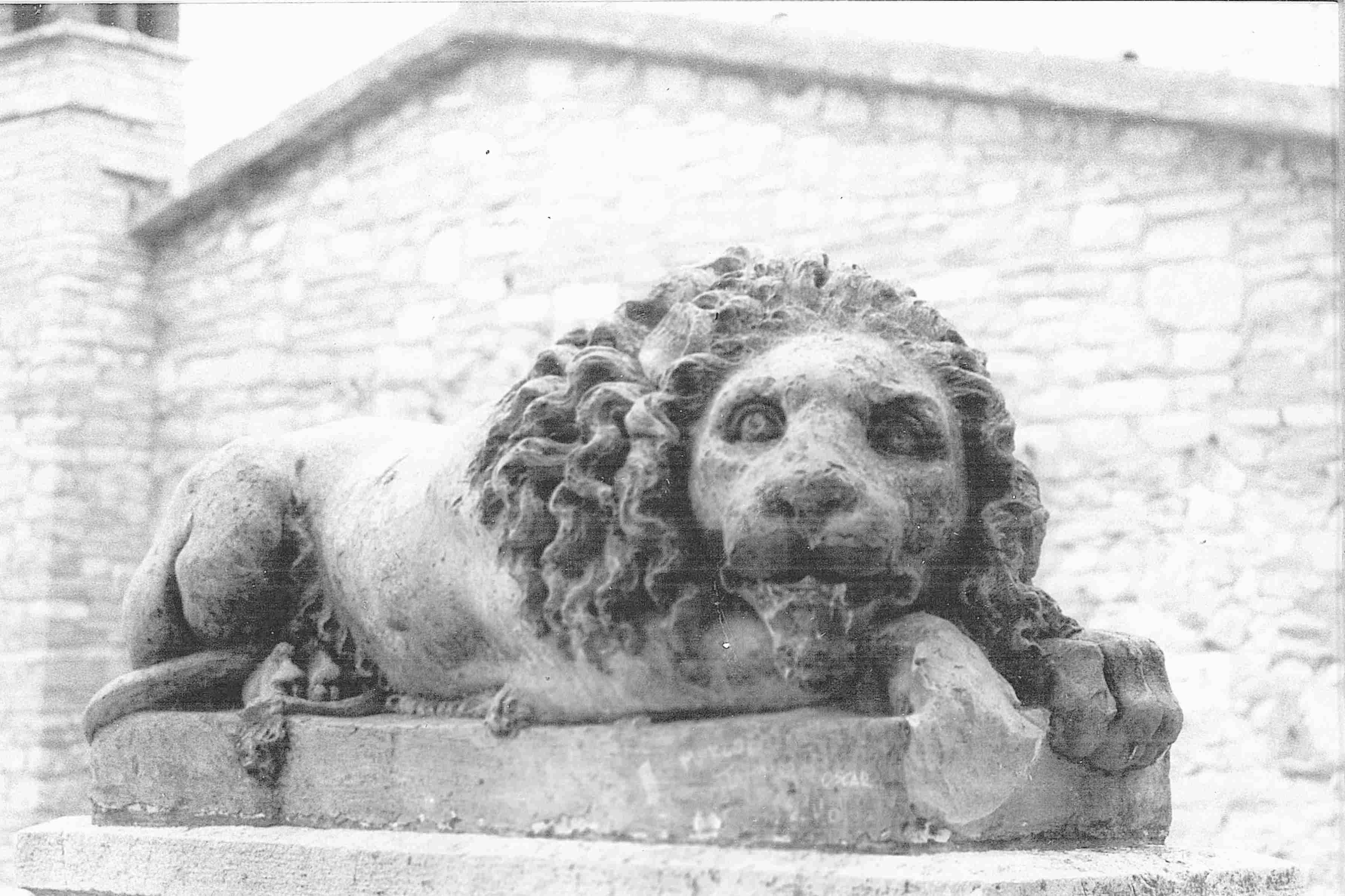
Statue of a Lion outside the Basilica in the square
