= Poor Clare Missionaries of the Blessed Sacrament =

Roman Catholic religious congregation for women

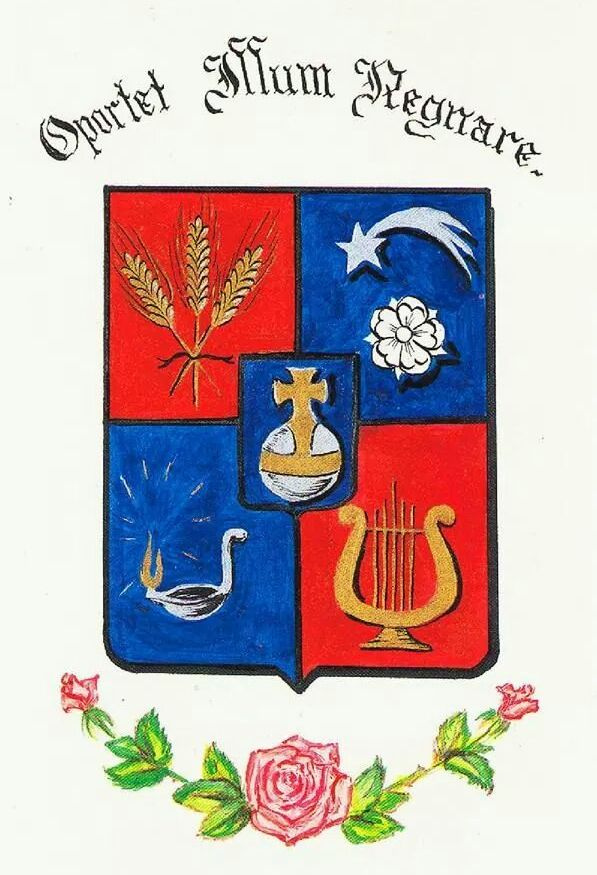
Coat of arms of the Missionary Clarisses of the Most Holy Sacrament: Oportet illum regnare - "He must reign" (1 Cor 15:25)

The Missionary Clarisses of the Most Holy Sacrament (in Spanish Misioneras Clarisas del Santísimo Sacramento) is a female religious institute of pontifical right. The sisters of this congregation use the initials M.C.

== History ==
The congregation originates from the missionary community founded in Cuernavaca in 1945 by Manuela de Jesús Arias Espinosa (1904–1981), a Clarisse sacramentarian nun. On June 22, 1951, the Holy See authorized the community in Cuernavaca to separate from the Clarisse sacramentarians and establish itself as a congregation dedicated to active apostolate. The constitutions of the Missionary Clarisses obtained pontifical approval on May 5, 1953.

== Activities and Spread ==
The religious sisters of the institute engage in various forms of apostolate, such as education, catechesis, assistance to the sick, and missions. They also dedicate themselves to the adoration of the Most Holy Sacrament in a spirit of reparation.

The sisters are present in the Americas (Argentina, Costa Rica, Mexico, United States), Asia (South Korea, Japan, India, Indonesia), Africa (Nigeria, Sierra Leone), and Europe (Ireland, Italy, Russia). The generalate is located in Rome, in the Monte Sacro area.

As of the end of 2008, the congregation had 576 religious in 59 houses.

== Bibliography ==
Annuario Pontificio per l'anno 2010, Libreria Editrice Vaticana, Vatican City 2010. ISBN 978-88-209-8355-0.

Guerrino Pelliccia e Giancarlo Rocca (curr.), Dizionario degli Istituti di Perfezione (DIP), 10 vols., Edizioni paoline, Milan 1974–2003.
