= Sinclair (surname) =

- Revela Domino opera tua
- Language: French/English

Origin
- Meaning: Taken from the hermit saint, ultimately from Latin clarus, meaning "pure, renowned, illustrious".
- Region of origin: Pont-l'Évêque (Le Havre), Normandy, France; Caithness & Roslin, Scotland

Other names
- Variant forms: St. Clair; Saint-Clair; Saint Clare; Santa Clara de Saint-Clair; Sainclair; Synklar; Clan Septs: Budge; Caird; Clouston; Clyne; Linklater; Lyall; Mason; Purdie; Snoddy; Sinckler

The Scoto-Norman surname Sinclair comes from the Clan Sinclair, whose progenitors moved to Scotland and were given the land of Roslin, Midlothian, by the King of Scots.

The style "Sinclair" is the most common. It has its origins in Scotland and is a derivation of the original French de Saint-Clair, although the name has also been styled "Santoclair", "de St. Clair", "Sainclair", "Synklar" and many more across the centuries. The well-known individuals in this article are listed first alphabetically then by profession.

== A ==
- Adam Sinclair (field hockey), hockey player
- Adam Sinclair (actor), actor
- Adelaide Sinclair, Canadian civil servant
- Aishah Sinclair, Malaysian actress and TV host
- Alfred Sinclair, born Alfred Sinclair Wadham, English painter in Australia
- Alfredo Sinclair, Panamanian artist
- Alice Sinclair, British supermodel
- Alison Sinclair (disambiguation)
- Alistair Sinclair, Scottish curler, European champion
- Anders Sinclair, Scottish mercenary in Sweden
- Andrew Sinclair (disambiguation)
- Anne Sinclair, French TV-personality and wife of Dominique Strauss-Kahn
- Archibald Sinclair (journalist) (1866–1922), British sports journalist
- Archibald Sinclair, 1st Viscount Thurso, Scottish politician and leader of the British Liberal Party
- Arthur St. Clair, early American general and President of the Continental Congress
- Arthur Sinclair, early American naval hero
- Ashraf Sinclair, Malaysian actor
- Augustus Sinclair, fictional character from BioShock 2.

== B ==
- Baron Sinclair of Cleeve, businessman, civil servant
- Barry Sinclair, New Zealand Test cricketer
- Belinda Sinclair, British actress
- Blair St. Clair (born 1995), American drag queen
- Brett Sinclair, fictional character in The Persuaders! TV series
- Brian Sinclair (veterinary surgeon), veterinary surgeon
- Bob St. Clair (1931–2015), sportsman
- Bob Sinclair (disambiguation)
- Bruce Sinclair (disambiguation)

== C ==
- Cam Sinclair, motocross rider
- Cameron Sinclair, architect
- Carl St.Clair, music director, conductor
- Carrie Bell Sinclair, poet
- Catherine Sinclair, author
- Cecile Sinclair, Dutch glamour model
- Charles Sinclair (disambiguation)
- Christine Sinclair (born 1983), Canadian soccer player
- Christopher A. Sinclair, CEO of Mattel and Pepsi-Cola
- Sir Clive Sinclair (1940–2021), founder of Sinclair Research Ltd
- Clive Sinclair (author)

== D ==
- Dave Sinclair, British musician with the band Caravan
- David Sinclair (disambiguation), multiple people
- Des Sinclair, South Africa international rugby union player
- Donald Sinclair (hotel owner) (1909–1981), owner of the Gleneagles Hotel in Torquay, England; inspiration for the character Basil Fawlty, played by John Cleese, in the British television sitcom Fawlty Towers
- Donald Sinclair (veterinary surgeon) (1911–1995), British veterinary surgeon, inspiration for a character in the All Creatures Great and Small franchise
- Drake Sinclair, fictional character in The Sixth Gun comic series

== E ==
- Edward Sinclair (disambiguation)
- Edwyn Alexander-Sinclair, Royal Navy officer
- Elliot Sinclair, fictional character
- Emil Sinclair, fictional character from Demian
- Emile Sinclair, English professional footballer
- Emma Sinclair, British businesswoman and entrepreneur
- Enid Sinclair, fictional character from Wednesday
- Eon Sinclair, musician
- Eric Sinclair (footballer), Scottish footballer
- Erica Sinclair, fictional character from Stranger Things

== F ==
- Frank Sinclair, footballer

== G ==
- George Sinclair (disambiguation)
- Gerard Sinclair, solicitor
- Gord Sinclair, musician
- Gordon Sinclair, Canadian journalist, writer and commentator
- Graeme Sinclair, Scottish footballer
- Grayson Sinclair, fictional character

== H ==
- Harry Sinclair, New Zealand actor
- Harry F. Sinclair, founder of Sinclair Oil
- Heather Sinclair, unseen character in Degrassi: The Next Generation
- Helen Sinclair, fictional character from Doctor Who audios
- Henry Sinclair, Earl of Orkney
- Henry John Sinclair, 2nd Baron Pentland
- Admiral Hugh Sinclair, director of British Naval Intelligence, helped to set up MI6
- Holly J. Sinclair, fictional character in Degrassi: The Next Generation
- Hugh Macdonald Sinclair, British nutrition researcher

== I ==
- Iain Sinclair, British writer and filmmaker
- Ian Sinclair, Australian politician
- Ian Sinclair (cricketer), New Zealand Test cricketer
- Ian David Sinclair, Canadian lawyer, businessman, and Senator
- Izzy Sinclair, fictional character from Doctor Who comic

== J ==
- Jack Sinclair (Scouting)
- James Sinclair (disambiguation)
- Jamie Sinclair (born 1992), American curler
- Jean de Saint-Clair, alleged sixth Grand Master of the Priory of Sion
- Jeffrey Sinclair, fictional character on the television show Babylon 5
- Jeffrey St. Clair (born 1959), editor
- Jeremy Sinclair, Advertising executive
- Jess Sinclair, Australian rules footballer
- Jim Sinclair (activist), autism rights activist
- Jimmy Sinclair (1876–1913), South African cricketer
- Sir John Sinclair, 1st Baronet (1754–1835), politician, writer finance and agriculture
- John Sinclair, 3rd Viscount Thurso (born 1953), Scottish businessman and politician
- John Sinclair (bishop) (died 1566)
- John Sinclair (musician) (born 1952), keyboardist with Uriah Heep
- John Sinclair (poet) (born 1941), American writer and activist
- John Sinclair (British Army officer), head of Military Intelligence
- John Gordon Sinclair, Scottish actor
- John McHardy Sinclair, Professor of Modern English Language at Birmingham University
- John Mitchell Sinclair, South Australian shipping agent and politician
- Julyan Sinclair, television and radio presenter

== K ==
- Karen Sinclair, Welsh politician
- Kenia Sinclair, Jamaican athlete
- Kevin Sinclair, Guyanese cricketer
- Kim Sinclair (born 1954), New Zealand set decorator

== L ==
- Laura Sinclair (disambiguation)
- Laurent Sinclair, stage name of Laurent Biehler, French musician
- Linnea Sinclair, American science fiction romance author
- Lister Sinclair, Scottish/Canadian broadcaster, playwright and polymath
- Lucas Sinclair, fictional character from Stranger Things
- Luis Sinclair, Panamanian basketball player
- Luke Sinclair, the criminal Sinclair, and fictional character played by Chris Sarandon in the film Reaper

== M ==
- Madge Sinclair (1938–1995), Jamaican Emmy-winning actress
- Madison Sinclair, fictional character
- Malcolm St. Clair (filmmaker), Laurel & Hardy collaborator and prolific filmmaker
- Malcolm Sinclair (disambiguation)
- Marie de Saint-Clair, alleged second Grand Master of the Priory of Sion
- Sister Margaret Sinclair, Scottish nun and former factory worker, declared 'venerable' by Pope Paul VI in 1978
- Margaret Sinclair (later Margaret Trudeau), former wife of the late Pierre Trudeau, the 15th Prime Minister of Canada
- Mark Sinclair, American actor, better known by his stage name of Vin Diesel
- Mathew Sinclair, New Zealand cricketer
- May Sinclair, British novelist
- Maynard Sinclair, Deputy Prime Minister of Northern Ireland
- Michael Sinclair (disambiguation)
- Michelle Anne Sinclair, adult-film actress also known by her screen-name "Belladonna"
- Murray Sinclair, Manitoba judge
- Malcolm Sinclair (Swedish nobleman) (1690–1739), Swedish officer killed by Russians fuelling the start of the Russo–Swedish War (1741–1743)

== N ==
- Nigel Sinclair, Scottish producer of Hollywood films
- Nick Sinclair, photographer

== O ==
- Oliver Sinclair (?-1576), Scottish courtier
- Olga Sinclair, artist and daughter of Alfredo Sinclair

== P ==
- Perdita Hyde-Sinclair, fictional character
- Peter Sinclair (disambiguation)

== R ==
- Rebecca Sinclair (author), American author
- Rebecca Sinclair (snowboarder), Olympic snowboarder
- Richard St. Clair, U.S. composer, pianist, and poet
- Robert Sinclair (bishop), fourteenth century Scottish bishop
- Robert Sinclair (locomotive engineer)
- Rosemary Sinclair, fictional character
- Roy Sinclair (curler), former Scottish curler and past president of World Curling Federation
- Ryan Sinclair, fictional character from Doctor Who

== S ==
- Sadie Sinclair, fictional character
- Scott Sinclair, footballer
- Skylar Sinclair, fictional character in The Saboteur video game
- Suzanne Sinclair (New Zealand politician)

== T ==
- Tim Sinclair (author), poet, novelist
- Trevor Sinclair, footballer

== U ==
- Upton Sinclair, novelist

== V ==
- Victoria Sinclair, anchorwoman on Naked News

== W ==
- William Sinclair-Burgess, Australian Army Major General in World War I
- William Sinclair (archdeacon of London), Archdeacon of London

== Disambiguation pages ==
Instances of more than one person with the same name:

- Alison Sinclair (disambiguation)
- Andrew Sinclair (disambiguation)
- Bob Sinclair (disambiguation)
- Charles Sinclair (disambiguation)
- David Sinclair (disambiguation)
- Donald Sinclair (disambiguation)
- Edward Sinclair (disambiguation)
- George Sinclair (disambiguation)
- Ian Sinclair (disambiguation)
- James Sinclair (disambiguation)
- John Sinclair (disambiguation)
- Malcolm Sinclair (disambiguation)
- Michael Sinclair (disambiguation)
- Peter Sinclair (disambiguation)
- William Saint-Clair (disambiguation)
- William Sinclair (disambiguation)

== See also ==
- Clan Sinclair
- Saint Clair (disambiguation)
- Saint Clare (disambiguation)
- Santa Clara (disambiguation)
