= Essendon v Kangaroos (2001 AFL season) =

2001 AFL Round 16
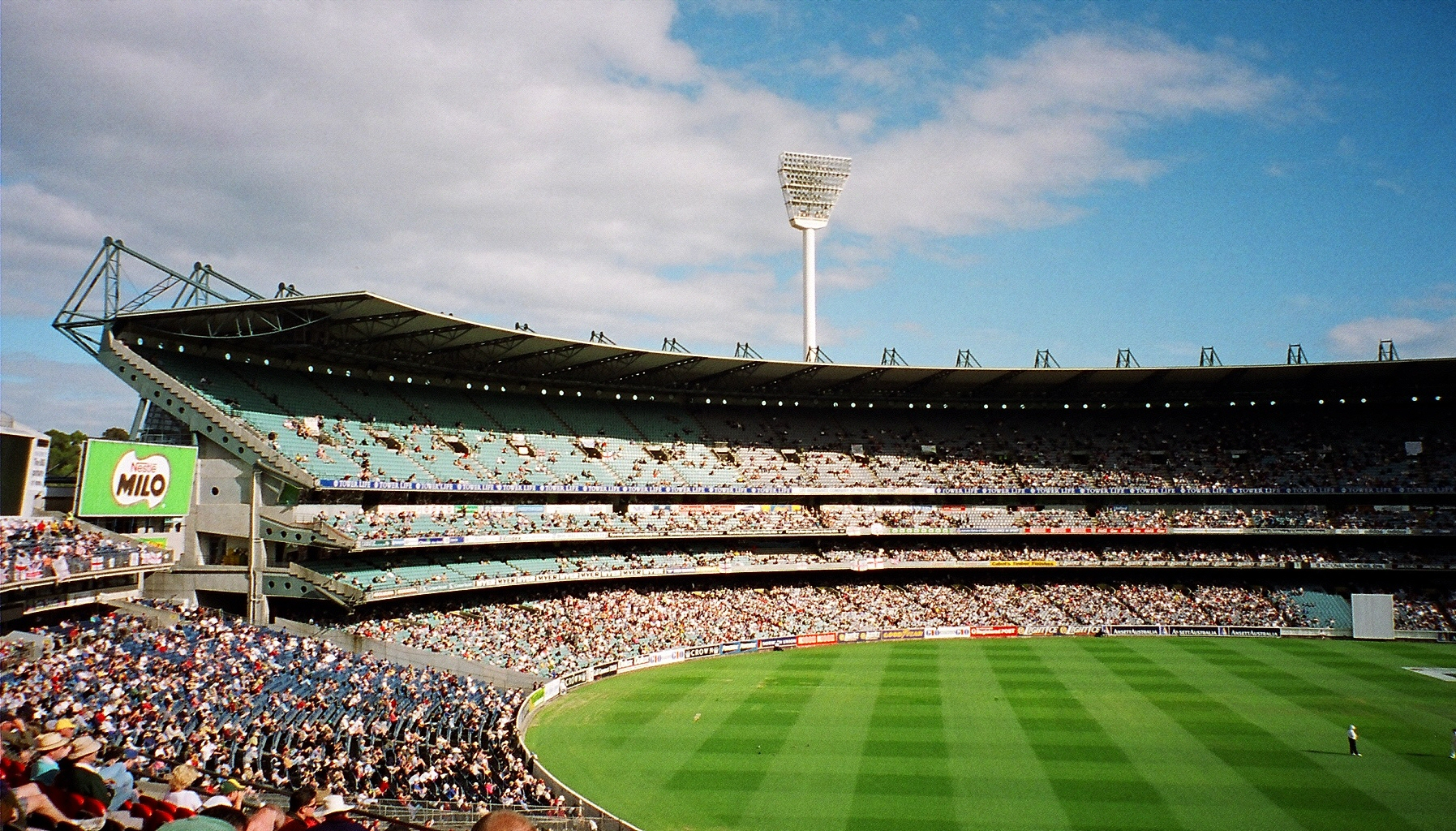
- The Melbourne Cricket Ground, where the game took place.

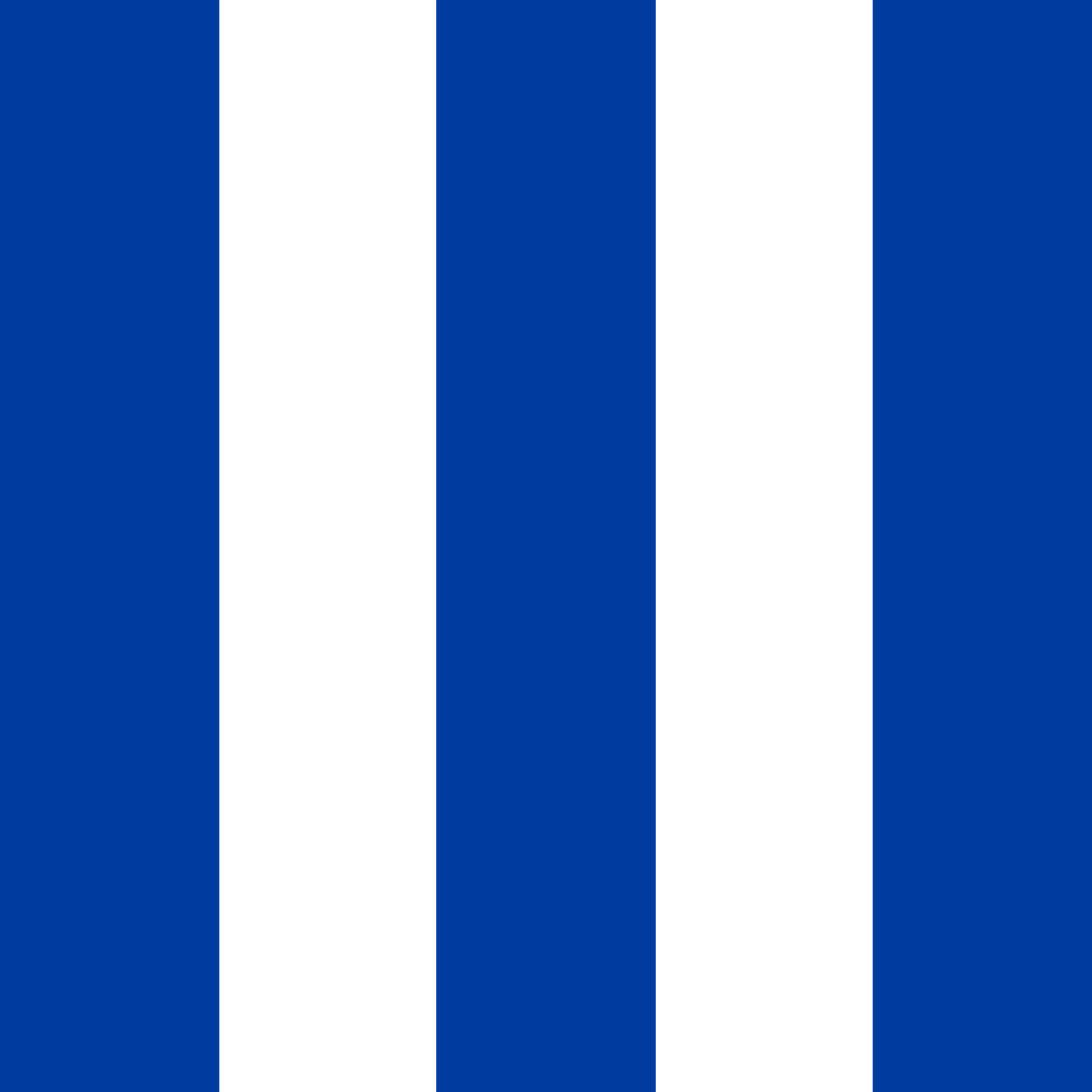
Essendon	Kangaroos
27.9 (171)	25.9 (159)
	1	2	3	4
ESS	2.3 (15)	12.4 (76)	19.8 (122)	27.9 (171)
KANG	12.1 (73)	16.1 (97)	22.4 (136)	25.9 (159)
- Date: 22 July 2001
- Stadium: Melbourne Cricket Ground
- Attendance: 51,878
- Umpires: Kieron Nicholls, Scott McLaren, Gavin Dore

Accolades
- Best on Ground: Jason Johnson

Broadcast in Australia
- Network: Seven Network
- Commentators: Anthony Hudson, Craig Hutchison, Doug Hawkins, Richard Osborne (original TV broadcast)

In Round 16 of the 2001 AFL season, an Australian rules football home-and-away match was played between Essendon and the Kangaroos at the Melbourne Cricket Ground on 22 July 2001. The match saw the largest successful comeback in the history of the VFL/AFL, with Essendon winning by twelve points after trailing by 69 points midway through the second quarter; and, as of the end of the 2023 AFL season, it is the seventh-highest-scoring game in the league's history. According to some observers, it is considered the best game of Australian rules football ever played.

== Background ==
Essendon went into the match placed first on the ladder with a record of 13–2, while the Kangaroos were placed ninth with a record of 8–7. The match was crucial to the Kangaroos' chances of reaching the finals in 2001.

Essendon and the Kangaroos (known as North Melbourne until 1998, and again since 2008) had been two of the best teams of the era, winning three of the previous five premierships between them: the Kangaroos in 1996 and 1999, and Essendon in 2000. Both clubs had finished in the top four for the previous two seasons. The start of the 2001 season had been seeing a decline for the Kangaroos, losing five of their first six games of the season, but they had found good form after this point, winning seven of their next nine games, including the three games prior to Essendon. Meanwhile, Essendon was on target to win a third consecutive minor premiership, winning 13 out of their 15 games for the season and had a streak of five consecutive wins prior to the game.

Essendon had comfortably won the previous five encounters between the clubs—the last two of those by 125 points and 85 points, with the former being registered in a finals match—and there was recent bad blood between the teams when Essendon coach Kevin Sheedy had notoriously described the Kangaroos executives as 'marshmallows' in 1998. The clubs' respective form, the clubs' respective positions on the ladder, and the absences of injured captain and centre half-forward Wayne Carey, midfielder Anthony Stevens, and full-back Mick Martyn from the Kangaroos' team meant that Essendon were favourites to win.

== Teams ==
In addition to the notable outs for the Kangaroos, full-back Glenn Archer covered as stand-in captain for the injured Carey.

Essendon
B:	11 Damien Hardwick	31 Dustin Fletcher	23 Mark Bolton
HB:	7 Dean Solomon	16 Paul Barnard	24 Joe Misiti
C:	9 Adam Ramanauskas	2 Mark Mercuri	33 Blake Caracella
HF:	29 Gary Moorcroft	25 Scott Lucas	1 Mark Johnson
F:	27 Steve Alessio	18 Matthew Lloyd	28 Cory McGrath
Foll:	22 John Barnes	5 James Hird (c)	25 Jason Johnson
Int:	26 Chris Heffernan	3 Aaron Henneman	17 Judd Lalich
Int:	42 Danny Jacobs		
Coach:	Kevin Sheedy		

Kangaroos
B:	5 Jason McCartney	11 Glenn Archer (c)	40 David Teague
HB:	34 David King	1 Leigh Colbert	12 John Blakey
C:	28 Byron Pickett	6 Shannon Grant	9 Jess Sinclair
HF:	3 Brady Rawlings	36 Shannon Watt	44 Shannon Motlop
F:	22 Matthew Burton	26 Saverio Rocca	21 Corey Jones
Foll:	31 Corey McKernan	7 Adam Simpson	29 Brent Harvey
Int:	14 Daniel Harris	32 Digby Morrell	35 Troy Makepeace
Int:	45 Stuart Cochrane		
Coach:	Denis Pagan		

== Match summary ==
=== First quarter ===
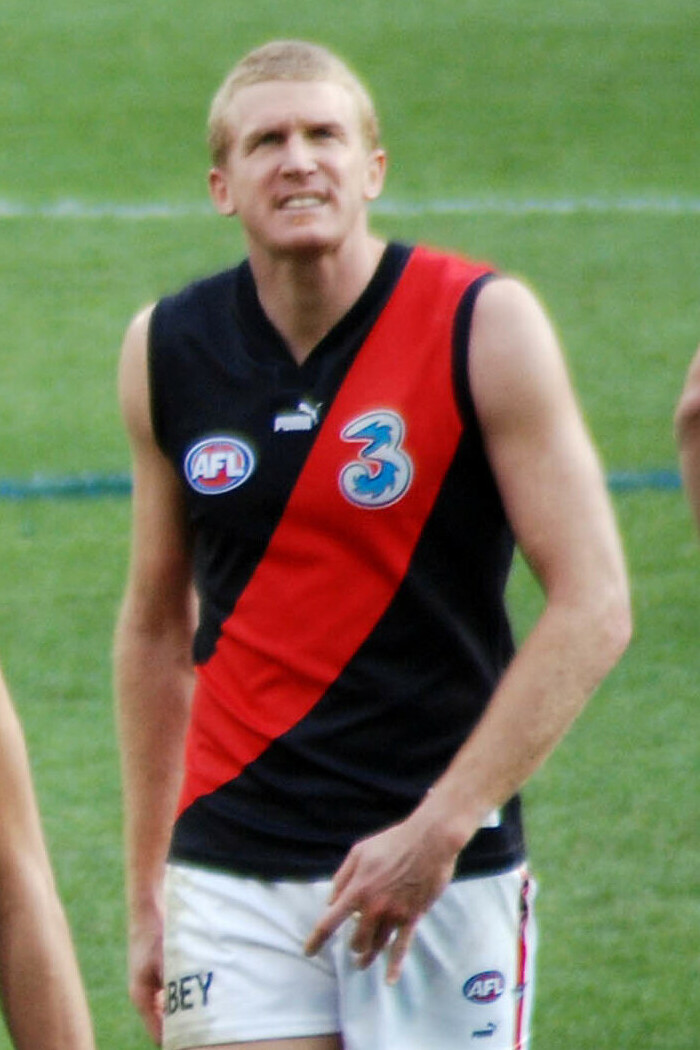
As an experiment, Essendon coach Kevin Sheedy started champion full-back Dustin Fletcher (pictured in 2007) in the forward pocket

The Kangaroos struck first blood with a left-foot snap goal to Shannon Grant 90 seconds into the game, but Essendon full-forward Matthew Lloyd struck back a few minutes later to tie up the game after a trademark forward lead and jumping mark. A behind from Blake Caracella gave Essendon a one-point lead after seven minutes of play. Thereafter, the Kangaroos dominated scoring in the opening quarter, with Byron Pickett, Saverio Rocca, and Brady Rawlings piling on three straight goals in less than five minutes to lead 4.0 (24) to 1.1 (7) by the 12th-minute mark. Chris Heffernan managed a steadier for Essendon to stem the bleeding, but the Kangaroos went on a rampage, kicking the next eight goals to lead by 58 points at quarter time, 12.1 (73) to 2.3 (15). Saverio Rocca kicked four goals in the quarter, while Pickett, Jess Sinclair, and Brent Harvey all kicked two goals each. So efficient was the Kangaroos' attack that its 13 scores came from only 19 inside-50s. Essendon's champion full-back Dustin Fletcher began the game in the forward pocket as an experiment, but he was moved back to the backline after only fifteen minutes as the Kangaroos built up a solid lead. In the quarter-time huddle, Essendon captain James Hird intercepted the team before coach Kevin Sheedy was able to launch into a tirade, delivering a measured message to the team to focus on working back into the game by just trying to get back a few goals per quarter; this prevented Sheedy from demoralising the team further and helped give them a constructive plan for the rest of the game. As for the Kangaroos, coach Dennis Pagan's assistant Tony Elshaug turned to Pagan and whispered in his ear: "We might kick 48 goals today. Twelve times four equals 48." Pagan, knowing Essendon's ability and fighting spirit, glibly replied, "Oh, no".

=== Second quarter ===
The Kangaroos kicked three of the first four goals of the second quarter, with their third of the quarter bringing the lead to a game-high 69 points through a goal from Shannon Grant, who celebrated by miming dual finger guns into the crowd in an imitation of a goal umpire's goal signal; consequently, Kangaroos 15.1 (91) led Essendon's 3.4 (22) in the tenth minute of the second quarter. Over the following 20 minutes of play, Essendon kicked nine consecutive goals—without the Kangaroos managing a score—to narrow the margin to only 15 points. The second of those goals, a dribbling shot by Hird from a tight angle after being crunched while taking a mark, was said to have been one of the main inspirations for the comeback. Lloyd kicked five of Essendon's ten second-quarter goals. David Teague, after taking a courageous mark off the boot of Byron Pickett, kicked a goal for the Kangaroos after the half-time siren to break Essendon's run, extending the margin to 21 points at half-time: Kangaroos 16.1 (97) led Essendon 12.4 (76).

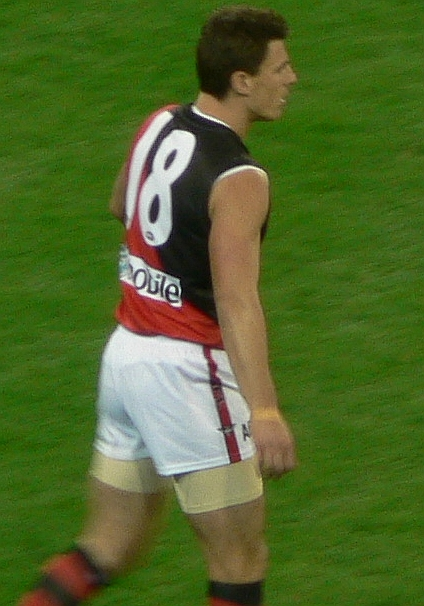
Essendon full-forward Matthew Lloyd (pictured in 2007) topped the game goalkicking with nine goals for the match

=== Third quarter ===
Essendon opened the third quarter strongly, and in the first eight minutes they had kicked 2.3 (15) to narrow the margin to only six points, with goals coming from Danny Jacobs and Lloyd; however, the Kangaroos kicked the next two goals through Rawlings and ruckman Corey McKernan to extend the margin back to 19 points. Essendon kicked four of the next five goals to narrow the margin to only one point at the 27-minute mark, and the Kangaroos responded with three out of the four goals kicked after that point, re-establishing a 14-point lead, including a late goal to Byron Pickett as the result of a 50-metre penalty incurred by Jason Johnson for abusive language. After kicking six goals to Essendon's seven, the Kangaroos 22.4 (136) led Essendon 19.8 (122) at three-quarter time.

=== Final quarter ===
In the final quarter, Lloyd kicked his ninth and final goal of the game in the opening minute, and a goal by Adam Ramanauskas in the fifth minute narrowed Essendon's deficit to three points. The Kangaroos had four difficult chances early in the quarter, managing only 1.3 (9), with Harvey's long-range torpedo-punted goal in the 8th minute the only goal among them, giving the Kangaroos an 11-point advantage in the ninth minute: 22.7 (145) to 21.8 (134). Essendon then kicked two quick goals—a long goal on the run by Jason Johnson (10th minute) and a 30-metre set shot by Gary Moorcroft (12th minute)—to take the lead for the first time since the first quarter. The Kangaroos missed two chances in the 15th and 16th minutes: a long-range shot by Jason McCartney for a behind, and a miskicked snap shot by Shannon Motlop from the top of the goal square that failed to make the distance.

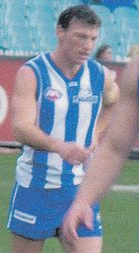
Kangaroos' Brent Harvey (pictured in 2004) kicked an important torpedo punt goal early in the quarter

Essendon then kicked three goals in three minutes—via Cory McGrath, Caracella and Moorcroft—to open a 19-point advantage entering time on. The Kangaroos quickly responded, with McKernan moving from the ruck to the forward line and kicking two goals in a minute to bring the margin back to seven points at the 23-minute mark. The Kangaroos continued to attack: a long shot by David King failed to score, and a rare but critical free kick against Rawlings for throwing the ball away from the boundary umpire denied the Kangaroos an attacking throw-in opportunity. McKernan took a big pack mark 40 metres from goal in the 28th minute, but he only managed to score a behind to narrow the margin to six points. Overall, this seven-minute period of sustained Kangaroos attack had netted 2.1 (13). Essendon managed a rebound that ended with a goal to Caracella, extending the margin to 12 points in the 29th minute. There was no further scoring, and after kicking 8.1 (49) to 3.5 (23) in the final quarter, Essendon completed a 12-point win, 27.9 (171) def. 25.9 (159). The win ensured Essendon remained on top of the ladder and kept the Kangaroos outside of the top eight.

Essendon's Jason Johnson was considered the best on ground in what is considered the best game of his career, and he polled three Brownlow Medal votes. He had 31 disposals, 13 clearances, 10 inside-50s and kicked four goals to be the most valuable in Essendon's comeback despite dealing personally with the bereavement of having lost a friend in a car accident days earlier.

=== Details ===
Round 16, 2001
Sunday, 22 July (2:10 pm)	Essendon	def.	Kangaroos	Melbourne Cricket Ground (crowd: 51,878)
2.3 (15); 12.4 (76); 19.8 (122); 27.9 (171)	Q1; Q2; Q3; Final	12.1 (73); 16.1 (97); 22.4 (136); 25.9 (159)	Umpires: Nicholls, McLaren, Dore; Television broadcast: Seven Network
Lloyd 9, J. Johnson 4, Caracella 3, Hird 2, McGrath 2, Moorcroft 2, Bolton, Heffernan, Jacobs, M. Johnson, Ramanauskas	Goals	McKernan 5, Rocca 4, Harvey 3, Pickett 3, Sinclair 3, Grant 2, Rawlings 2, Burton, Teague, Watt

Brownlow Medal votes
3 J. Johnson (Essendon); 2 M. Lloyd (Essendon); 1 C. McKernan (Kangaroos)

=== Records ===
Essendon's win set a new record for the greatest comeback in AFL history, having trailed by 69 points at the 12-minute mark of the second quarter before recovering to win by 12 points. The comeback broke the existing record of 63 points, which had been set by Hawthorn in Round 12, 1999, two years prior.

The teams combined for 52 goals, equalling the record for most goals in a match, which had been set in Round 6, 1978, between St Kilda and Melbourne; the two games still hold this record as of 2023. The teams' combined score of 52.18 (330) was only 15 points short of the all-time record, and as of 2023 stands as the seventh-highest-scoring game of all time; in fact, it is the only game from the 21st century to feature among the twenty all-time highest-scoring games. The Kangaroos' losing score of 25.9 (159) stands as the second-highest losing score of all time, behind only the 25.13 (163) scored by Geelong in an 8-point loss to Hawthorn in Round 6, 1989.

The Kangaroos' first-quarter score of 12.1 (73) was, at the time, the fourth-highest first-quarter score of all time; additionally, the 58-point deficit was the greatest margin by which Essendon had ever trailed a match at quarter time—two records which further underscored the extent of Essendon's comeback.

== Aftermath ==
Both clubs finished the home-and-away season modestly after this match. Of Essendon's last six matches in the home-and-away season, it won just three, enough to secure the minor premiership for the third consecutive year. They qualified for the 2001 Grand Final, but lost to the Brisbane Lions; it marked the end of an era, as they dropped out of the top four the following season, and as of the completed 2025 AFL season it has not qualified for a preliminary final since 2001. The Kangaroos won just one more match for the season and eventually finished 13th on the ladder. After this game, the Kangaroos won their next six matches against Essendon; it was not until Round 1, 2008, that Essendon defeated the Kangaroos (who by then had reverted to its old name "North Melbourne") again.

== Legacy ==
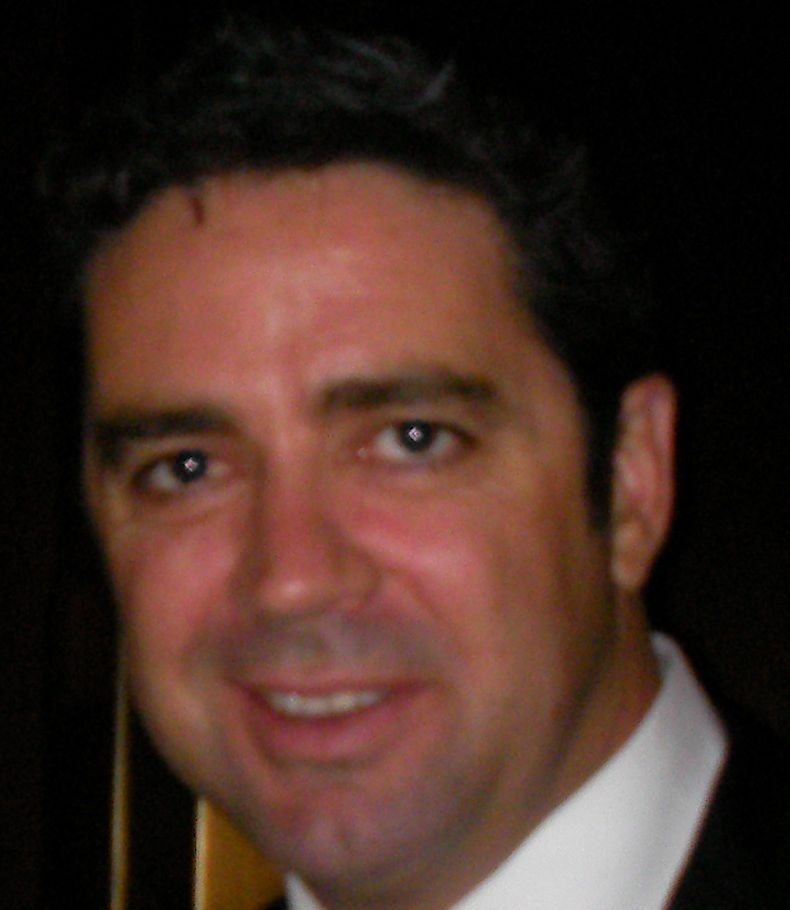
Commentator and former Melbourne player Garry Lyon won a media award for his radio call of the game, predicting that Essendon would win even when they trailed by more than ten goals early in the second quarter

After the game, the game was quickly heralded as one of the best, if not the best, game in VFL/AFL history. So high was the interest in the game, that it was replayed in full on Channel Seven in Melbourne the following day, following The Weakest Link, something which had never previously occurred. At the time, it was usual only to broadcast the edited highlights of any Sunday afternoon match played in Victoria.

Writing for the Herald Sun, Mark Robinson declared: “Amid the euphoria of victory and emptiness of defeat, there’s only one question to be asked: was this the greatest game of all time? The answer is almost certainly yes. If it was a Grand Final there would be no doubt." North Melbourne's Corey McKernan placed it equal with a match he played against the Western Bulldogs in 1998, while many other players declared it the best ever.

Later in 2001, Garry Lyon won a media award for his expert radio call of the game on 3AW. During the call, Lyon had made a prediction early in the second term that Essendon would come back and win despite the margin already exceeding 10 goals.

== See also ==
- 2001 AFL season
- Essendon–North Melbourne rivalry
- Brisbane Lions v Geelong (2013 AFL season)
- St Kilda v Melbourne (2025 AFL season)
