= Robert Sinclair =

Robert Sinclair may refer to:

== Politics ==
- Sir Robert Sinclair, 1st Baronet, of Longformacus (died 1678), MP of Scotland for Berwickshire
- Sir Robert Sinclair, 3rd Baronet, of Longformacus (died 1727), MP of Scotland for Berwickshire
- Sir Robert Sinclair, 3rd Baronet, of Stevenston (1643–1713), MP of Scotland for Haddingtonshire
- Robert Sinclair, 1st Baron Sinclair of Cleeve (1893–1979), British businessman and public servant

== Sports ==
- Rob Sinclair (footballer, born 1974), for Maidstone United
- Rob Sinclair (footballer, born 1989), English footballer for Forest Green Rovers
- Bobby Sinclair (1915–1993), Scottish footballer for Falkirk and Darlington

== Other ==
- Robert Sinclair (bishop) (died 1398), bishop of Orkney and bishop of Dunkeld
- Robert Sinclair (locomotive engineer) (1817–1898), chief mechanical engineer of the Caledonian Railway
- Robert B. Sinclair (1905-1970), film and theater director
- Robert J. Sinclair (1932–2009), American automotive industry executive
- Sir Robert Sinclair, 9th Baronet (1820–1899)

== See also ==
- Bob Sinclar (born 1969), French record producer and DJ
- Bob Sinclair Sr. (1945–2025), American radio executive
- Bob St. Clair (1931–2015), American football player
- Sinclair (surname)
