= Clouston (surname) =

Clouston is a surname. Notable people with the surname include:

- A.E. Clouston (1908–1984), British test pilot
- Al Clouston (1910–2004), Canadian storyteller and humourist known as "Uncle Al"
- Brian Clouston (1935–2026), British landscape architect
- Cory Clouston (born 1969), Canadian ice hockey coach
- Edward Clouston (1849–1912), Canadian banker and financier
- James Campbell Clouston (1900–1940), Canadian officer of the Royal Navy, killed at Dunkirk
- Ken Clouston, member of the Wyoming House of Representatives
- Scott Clouston (born 1987), Australian rules footballer
- J. Storer Clouston (1870–1944), Orcadian author and historian
- Thomas Clouston (1840–1915), Scottish psychiatrist
- Thomas E. Clouston (1848–1913), Presbyterian minister and academic in New South Wales
- Wilfred Clouston (1916–1980), New Zealand flying ace of the Second World War
- William Clouston (disambiguation), several people
