= Snoddy (disambiguation) =

Snoddy may refer to:

== Surname ==
- Snoddy (surname)

== Other uses ==
- Snoddy, a short lived Scottish television sitcom which aired in 2002
- a nickname for Scottish footballer Robert Snodgrass
