= James Sinclair =

James Sinclair may refer to:

- James Sinclair, 8th Lord Sinclair (died 1607), Scottish nobleman
- James Sinclair, 12th Earl of Caithness (1766–1823), Scottish noble
- James Sinclair (fur trader) (1811–1856), Canadian fur trapper
- James Sinclair, 14th Earl of Caithness (1821–1881), Scottish Liberal politician, scientist and inventor
- James H. Sinclair (1871–1943), U.S. Congressman from North Dakota
- Jimmy Sinclair (cricketer) (1876–1913), South African cricketer
- Jim Sinclair (footballer) (1907–2005), Australian rules footballer
- James Sinclair (politician) (1908–1984), Canadian politician
- James Sinclair (botanist) (1913–1968), Scottish botanist
- Jim Sinclair (politician) (1933–2012), Canadian Non-Status Indian and Métis politician
- Jim Sinclair (activist) (born 1940), American autism rights activist
- Jimmy Sinclair (footballer, born 1957), Scottish football forward
- James Sinclair (conductor) (fl. 1974-), American classical music conductor
- James Sinclair (footballer) (born 1987), English footballer
- Jimmy Sinclair (footballer, born 2006), English football left-back
- Jimmy Sinclair (rugby union), New Zealand medical doctor and international rugby union player
- James Sinclair, English co-founder of EnterpriseAlumni
- James Sinclair, British entrepreneur (born 1985), founder of The Partyman Group (incorporating the Rossi Ice Cream Company)
- Jim Sinclair, character in 1967 film Africa Texas Style

== See also ==
- James St Clair (1688–1762), Scottish soldier and MP
- Jim Sinclair (disambiguation)
