= Alison Sinclair =

Alison Sinclair may refer to:

- Alison Sinclair (literary critic), professor of modern Spanish literature and intellectual history
- Alison Sinclair (virologist), professor of molecular virology
- Alison Sinclair (author) (born 1959), British physician and author
