= Ian Sinclair (disambiguation) =

Ian Sinclair (born 1929) is an Australian politician.

Ian Sinclair may also refer to:

- Ian David Sinclair (1913–2006), Canadian businessman and senator
- Ian Sinclair (cricketer) (born 1933), New Zealand cricketer
- Ian Sinclair (broadcaster), New Zealand television journalist and reporter
- Ian Sinclair (Canadian football) (born 1960), Canadian football player
- Ian Sinclair (voice actor) (born 1984), American voice actor
- Sir Ian Sinclair (barrister) (1926–2013), British international lawyer

== See also ==
- Iain Sinclair (born 1943), British writer
- Iain Sinclair (actor), Australian actor, acting coach at 16th St Actors Studio
- Iain Sinclair (rugby union) (born 1976), Scottish rugby union player
