= Senator Sinclair =

Senator Sinclair may refer to:

- Amy Sinclair (born 1975), Iowa State Senate
- Charles Sinclair Jr., Senate of Jamaica
- Donald Sinclair (American politician) (1899–1978), Minnesota State Senate
- Ian David Sinclair (1913–2006), Senate of Canada
- Murray Sinclair (1951–2024), Senate of Canada

== See also ==
- Sinclair Weeks (1893–1972), U.S. Senator from Massachusetts in 1944
