= Budge =

Budge is a verb, meaning to move.

Budge can also refer to:

- Budge of court, free food and drink in a royal court
- Budgebudge, a city in the state of West Bengal, India
- Budge Hall, a building at Brigham Young University
- Budge, a mediaeval term for lamb's skin fur clothing or trimming with the wool showing outwards

People:

- Alfred Budge (1868–1951), justice of the Idaho Supreme Court
- Ann Budge, Scottish businesswoman
- Bill Budge, computer game programmer and designer
  - BudgeCo, a company founded by Bill Budge
- E. A. Wallis Budge, English Egyptologist, Orientalist, and philologist
- Edward Budge, English theologian and geologist
- Hamer Budge, American legislator and judge
- Paul Budge, British businessman, finance director of the Arcadia Group
- Richard Budge (1947–2016), British coal mining entrepreneur
- Susan Budge (born 1959), ceramic sculptor
- Budge Crawley, Canadian film producer

In sports:

- Don Budge, American tennis champion
- Grahame Budge, former Scotland rugby player
- Budge Patty, American tennis player
- Budge Pountney, former rugby player and director
- Budge Rogers, former England rugby player
- Adam Cole, American Professional Wrestler

Others

- Budge Studios, a Canadian video game company
- "Budge", a song by Dinosaur Jr. from the album Bug, 1988

== See also ==
- BUDG
