= Azalea Sinclair =

New Zealand netball player

Personal information
- Full name: Azalea Marguerite Sinclair (Née: Clark)
- Born: 15 August 1930 (age 96)
- Height: 1.68 m (5 ft 6 in)
- Spouse: Ian Sinclair (d. 2019)

Netball career
- Playing position: GS
Years	National team	Caps
1948	New Zealand	1

Azalea Marguerite Sinclair (née Clark; born 15 August 1930) is a former New Zealand netball player. She played as goal shoot in the New Zealand team in their second Test match, in 1948 against Australia.

== Early life ==
Sinclair was born Azalea Marguerite Clark on 15 August 1930, and grew up in the Kaiapoi area, north of Christchurch.

== Netball career ==
Clark was a member of the Canterbury provincial netball team, playing in the forward third of the court. In 1949, she was described as showing "amazing skill at shooting", and was reported as combining well with her fellow attacking players.

In 1948, Clark was selected in the New Zealand national team for the first Test against the touring Australian team at Forbury Park in Dunedin. The match was played under international rules, with seven players per side, which were unfamiliar to the New Zealanders who were used to playing nine-a-side. The Australian team was victorious, winning 27–16. The match was the only occasion on which Clark represented New Zealand, because the New Zealand side for the three-Test series was selected on a regional basis.

== Later life ==
In about 1956, Clark married Ian McKay Sinclair, a Canterbury and New Zealand cricket representative. Ian Sinclair died in 2019.

In 2018, Azalea Sinclair appeared at a netball Test match between New Zealand and South Africa in Tauranga, tossing the coin before the start of the game.
