= Thomas Slaney Poole =

Thomas Slaney Poole (3 July 1873 – 2 May 1927), commonly referred to as "Justice Poole" was a South Australian lawyer.

== History ==
Poole was born in Strathalbyn, South Australia, the eldest son of Frederic Slaney Poole "Canon Poole" (9 July 1845 – 28 June 1936) and Rebecca Poole, née Scott (c. 1843 – 10 May 1931). He attended St Peter's College, where he had a distinguished scholastic career. He entered Trinity College, University of Melbourne, graduating BA with first class honours in Greek, Latin and comparative philology in 1894.

In December 1894 Professor E. V. Boulger (1846–1910) resigned his position as Professor of Classics and Comparative Philology and Literature at the University of Adelaide. Poole was appointed to take over his Classics lectures for the months of March to May 1895.

He returned to Melbourne, where he graduated MA in 1896 and LLB (with honours) in 1897. He was called to the Victorian Bar the same year. He then became associate to Justice Bundey in Adelaide, then entered a partnership with Percy Emerson Johnstone (c. 1875–1951) from around 1910 to 1919. In August 1914 Mary Kitson was articled to this partnership, which later became Johnstone, Ronald and Kitson. Poole took silk in 1919 and was appointed fourth judge of the Supreme Court of South Australia on 25 September that same year. Arthur William Piper succeeded him on the bench on 16 June 1927.

Poole acted as Administrator (or Lieutenant Governor) of South Australia from 9 April 1925 to the end of November while the Governor, Sir Tom Bridges and the Chief Justice Sir George Murray were absent from the State.

== Other interests ==
- He was a committed Anglican and served for some time as the Chancellor of the Diocese of Adelaide.
- He was a warden of Adelaide University from 1922 until his death.
- He was an active Freemason and was for several years until his death Grand Master of the Grand Lodge of South Australia. He laid the foundation stone of the new Masonic Temple on North Terrace on 15 April 1925.

== Family ==
In 1903 the judge married Dora Frances Williams (1874 – 13 November 1950), a daughter of Rev. Francis Williams, for many years headmaster of St Peter's College. They had three daughters:

- Katherine Slaney Poole (1903 – 1983)
- Gertrude Slaney Poole (1908 – 1963) married Arthur Reginald Evans
- Cynthia Slaney Poole (1911 – 2002) married Phillip Robinson

He died at his home Alpha road, Prospect after several months' ill-health. His remains were buried at the North Road Cemetery following a State Funeral.

== See also ==
P. A. Howell (1988). "Poole, Frederic Slaney (1845–1936) (shared biography with T. S. Poole)". Australian Dictionary of Biography, National Centre of Biography, Australian National University.
