= Clouston =

Clouston may refer to:

== People ==
- Clouston (surname)

== Places ==
- Clouston, West Virginia
- Clouston Park, Upper Hutt, New Zealand

== See also ==
- Clouston's hidrotic ectodermal dysplasia
