= Adam Ramanauskas =

Australian rules footballer (born 1980)

Personal information
- Full name: Adam Ramanauskas
- Born: 19 November 1980 (age 45); Doveton, Victoria
- Original team: Noble Park, Victoria / Dandenong U18
- Height: 183 cm (6 ft 0 in)
- Weight: 83 kg (183 lb)

Playing career^{1}
Years	Club	Games (Goals)
1999–2008	Essendon	134 (63)
- ^{1} Playing statistics correct to the end of 2008.

Career highlights
- Essendon premiership side 2000; International rules series 2001

Adam Ramanauskas (born 19 November 1980) is a former Australian rules footballer for the Essendon Football Club.

Of Lithuanian descent, Ramanauskas was selected at no. 12 in the 1998 AFL draft and was mainly a defender or midfielder. In 2000, he was a regular selection on the wing in Essendon's 2000 premiership season, in which they lost just one game for the entire year.

== Biography ==
Ramanauskas debuted with the Essendon Football Club in 1999 after being selected at No. 12 in the 1998 AFL draft. Playing mainly as a defender or midfielder, he was an integral member of the dominant 2000 Bombers' premiership team. He was one of three talented AFL prospects featured in the 2000 television documentary The Draft, with the other draft prospects being Des Headland and Brendan Fevola.

Regarded as one of AFL's up-and-coming young stars, Ramanauskas was runner-up in the AFL Rising Star Award in 2000 and placed third in Essendon's Crichton Medal the following year before being diagnosed with cancer in 2003.

After surgery, Ramanauskas missed eight matches but made a quick recovery to play a handful of games again in 2003 before a recurrence of his cancer. He had weeks of radiotherapy treatment, but he managed to come back and compete a solid 2004 season, where he played in all of the Bombers' 24 games.

Ramanauskas had more misfortune in 2005 when he underwent a season-ending knee reconstruction after a Round 4 training mishap. After he had completed his recovery, he was set to make another comeback. However, in February 2006, a recurrence of the cancer appeared, and he underwent further invasive surgery and six months of chemotherapy treatment.

At the end of 2006, Essendon sought special consideration from the AFL to place Ramanauskas on a mature-aged rookie list for the 2007 season. In July 2007, Ramanauskas was elevated to the senior list and played his first AFL match in two years.

Named as one of The Australian newspaper's "Most Inspirational People" in 2007, Ramanauskas's courage and determination both on and off the field has inspired many. Since 2007, he has worked passionately with the Essendon Football Club Community Affairs Department, co-ordinating youth programs and developing a strong alliance with the Cancer Council of Victoria.

Ramanauskas announced his retirement from AFL football at the end of the 2008 season. In 2009, he accepted a part-time role at Essendon focusing on fast-tracking the development of the club's youngest players. Alongside his duties at Essendon, he also began work on the management team at Elite Sports Properties, a sports talent management agency. He has also joined the football commentary team at 774 ABC Radio.

== Career highlights ==
- Essendon Football Club, VFL Reserves Premiership, 1999
- Essendon Football Club, VFL Reserves Best & Fairest Player, 1999
- Essendon Football Club, AFL Pre-Season Premiership, 2000
- Essendon Football Club, AFL Premiership, 2000
- AFL Rising Star Award, Runner-Up, 2000
- Represented Australia, International Rules Series against Ireland, 2001
- Essendon Football Club, Crichton Medal (Best & Fairest Award), 3rd Runner-Up, 2001
- Essendon Football Club, "Best Clubman", 2005
- Essendon Football Club, "Most Courageous Player", 2007
- AFLPA, "Community Spirit Award Winner", 2008

=== Best games ===
- 32 disposals (26 kicks, 6 handballs), 8 marks and a goal in Round 10, 2002: 8-point loss to the North Melbourne Football Club
- 31 disposals (17 kicks 14 handballs) and 14 marks in Round 11, 2000: 58-point win over Geelong Football Club

== Football, cancer and injury ==
In 2003, Ramanauskas was diagnosed with a low-grade cancer (fibromatosis) in his neck after Round 3. He missed the next eight matches but made a quick recovery to play again in 2003. Following this was a solid 2004 season in which he played in all of the Bombers' 24 games.

Ramanauskas had more misfortune in 2005 when he underwent a knee reconstruction after a Round 4 training mishap. After he had completed his recovery, however, in February 2006, a recurrence of the cancer appeared.

At the end of 2006, Ramanauskas was delisted by Essendon, who asked for special consideration in placing him on a mature-aged rookie list for the 2007 season. After long deliberation by the AFL Commission on this issue, Essendon were granted permission for this to go ahead. Ramanauskas was re-drafted by Essendon with pick 33 in the 2006 Rookie Draft. On Wednesday, 4 July, Ramanauskas was elevated to the senior list and played his first AFL match in two years against the Geelong Football Club on 6 July 2007.

== Statistics ==
Legend
G	Goals	K	Kicks	D	Disposals	T	Tackles
B	Behinds	H	Handballs	M	Marks

Season	Team	No.	Games	Totals							Averages (per game)							Votes
Season	Team	No.	Games	G	B	K	H	D	M	T	G	B	K	H	D	M	T	Votes
1999	Essendon	9	2	0	0	9	4	13	1	5	0.0	0.0	4.5	2.0	6.5	0.5	2.5	0
2000	Essendon	9	24	13	8	221	155	376	105	38	0.5	0.3	9.2	6.5	15.7	4.4	1.6	4
2001	Essendon	9	25	13	3	258	124	382	90	50	0.5	0.1	10.3	5.0	15.3	3.6	2.0	3
2002	Essendon	9	23	13	5	275	124	399	109	49	0.6	0.2	12.0	5.4	17.3	4.7	2.1	7
2003	Essendon	9	10	8	10	107	63	170	34	23	0.8	1.0	10.7	6.3	17.0	3.4	2.3	0
2004	Essendon	9	24	6	6	220	104	324	112	31	0.3	0.3	9.2	4.3	13.5	4.7	1.3	0
2005	Essendon	9	3	0	0	22	16	38	9	8	0.0	0.0	7.3	5.3	12.7	3.0	2.7	0
2006	Essendon	9	0	–	–	–	–	–	–	–	–	–	–	–	–	–	–	0
2007	Essendon	9	5	3	2	36	24	60	19	6	0.6	0.4	7.2	4.8	12.0	3.8	1.2	0
2008	Essendon	9	18	7	2	140	102	242	77	28	0.4	0.1	7.8	5.7	13.4	4.3	1.6	0
Career			134	63	36	1288	716	2004	556	238	0.5	0.3	9.6	5.3	15.0	4.1	1.8	14

== Retirement ==
On 25 August 2008, Ramanauskas and longtime teammate Jason Johnson announced their retirements from AFL effective at the end of the season.

== Media career ==
Ramanauskas is now an expert AFL commentator for 774 ABC as well as a Foxtel Cup commentator for Fox Footy.

== Personal life ==
Ramanauskas was born to Joseph and Lucy Ramanauskas and grew up in Doveton, Victoria. He has an older brother, Daniel, and younger sister, Kayla. Ramanauskas attended Doveton Primary School. He later graduated high school from St John's Regional College, Dandenong, in 1998. Growing up, he supported the Richmond Football Club.

Ramanauskas married his high-school sweetheart, Belinda Henneman, in January 2006. They have three sons: Aidan (born October 2008), Lucas (born August 2010) and Josh (born 2017)
