= E. V. Boulger =

Irish-Australian academic

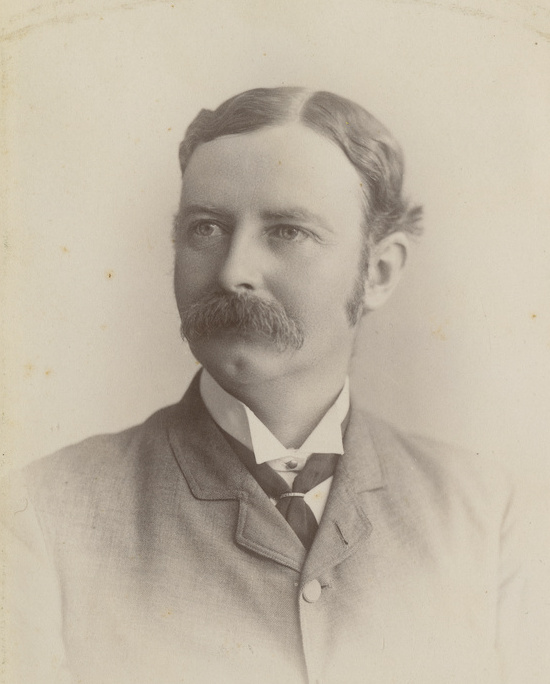
- Born: 1846
- Died: 11 August 1910 (aged 63–64)

Academic work
- Discipline: Classics
- Institutions: University of Adelaide

Edward Vaughan Boulger (1846 – 11 August 1910), generally known as Vaughan Boulger or E. V. Boulger, was an Irish academic whose career included Professor of Classics in the University of Adelaide. A Protestant by birth, he converted to Catholicism in his later years.

== History ==
Boulger was born in Dublin, a son of Persse Boulger, a solicitor with a practice in Lower Gardiner Street, and was associated with the Church of Ireland. In September 1860 he enrolled in Rathmines School, founded a few years earlier by Rev. Charles William Benson. He left for Trinity College, Dublin in 1866 after gaining first place in the university's entrance examination, and had a stellar academic career in the next three years, graduating in 1869 as First Senior Moderator in Classics, History, English Literature and Law, with a gold medal.

He has been reported as being engaged in Oriental studies in Germany and on his return to Ireland was made Regius Professor of Greek at Trinity.

On leaving Trinity he was appointed by Rev. Benson as Head Classical Master of his old school, then in June 1871 he was appointed to the Chair of Classical Literature at the University of New Brunswick at Fredericton, Canada, succeeding Professor Campbell, who died in March 1871. This appointment met with some local antagonism which, coupled with the intensely cold New Brunswick winters, may have led to his resignation in July 1873.

Back in Dublin, the recently married Boulger was in urgent need of remunerated work, and in September 1872 accepted the post of Senior Classical Master at The High School, Harcourt Street, operated under the Erasmus Smith charity by the Church of Ireland, indicating perhaps, assistance from his connections in high places. This was not to last long, as on 30 January 1873 he was appointed foundation headmaster of Lurgan College, partly financed by a bequest from Samuel Watts. Despite student numbers being very small, Boulger felt the need for an assistant to take Mathematics, and appointed Thomas E. Clouston, later a Presbyterian minister in Australia. Student numbers failed to increase as hoped, and the college's finances became strained, resulting in a request that he pay rent on the headmaster's house, which he refused point-blank, and in 1875 applied for, and won, the Chair of Greek at University College, Cork and left in December 1875. His time at Lurgan had not been happy: he was uncomfortable among small boys, and both he and Elizabeth enjoyed culture and high society, something lacking so far from the big cities. He served at Cork from January 1876 to June 1883, though further information is hard to find. When he resigned to take the Hughes Professorship of English Language and Literature and Mental and Moral Philosophy at the University of Adelaide, to which he was appointed on 1 July 1883, he was farewelled with "glowing testimonials". The support of David Frederick Kelly, Professor of Classics at the University of Adelaide, may have been influential in his being selected.

== Adelaide ==
Mr and Mrs. Boulger, their two children and governess arrived in Adelaide per SS Melbourne on 16 July 1883, but was in August reported seriously ill with pneumonitis, and unable to meet his lecturing commitments until October, when he made an impression with his eloquence, profound scholarship and his literary and linguistic knowledge. He wholeheartedly entered the intellectual and political life of the University, founding the University Shakespeare Society and gaining a seat on the University Council, only the second academic to be so honored. He represented the University on the Board of Governors of the Public Library, Museum and Art Gallery 1885–1893.

In 1886 he applied for the chair of Modern Literature at the University of Sydney, but was unsuccessful despite testimonials from distinguished British classicists, Alexander Leeper and Professor Edward Ellis Morris of Melbourne and Bishop George Kennion and Chancellor Samuel Way, who attested to the great impetus he had given to intellectual life in Adelaide.

He was recognised as the most profound scholar in Hebrew and Sanscrit literature in Australia, and was the first Australian professor to secure the degree of Doctor of Literature.

During Professor Kelly's final illness (he died 21 March 1894) Boulger added to his own duties those of Kelly's Chair of Classics. His own health began to suffer, perhaps as a result of taking stimulants, and in December 1894 Boulger resigned his position as Professor of Classics and Comparative Philology and Literature at the University of Adelaide. Thomas Slaney Poole was appointed to take over his Classics lectures for the months of March to May 1895.

== Melbourne ==
He left for Melbourne, where he embarked on the life of a journalist. Then he was associated with two fledgling educational enterprises that met with little or no success:

- Some time before 1900 Robert Jones founded, with Boulger and W. L. Bowditch, the Central College, Queensberry Street, Carlton
- In 1901 Boulger and W. L. Bowditch founded the University Lyceum at 238 Palmerston St., Carlton, as a university college for Catholic students.

He also advertised private tuition from his home, 57 Rose Street, Armadale.

One reference asserts he was made Professor of Classics and English literature at the Loreto Training College at Albert Park, Victoria, which position he held till his death.

== Conversion and death ==
During his years in Adelaide he became disenchanted with the Church of Ireland and Protestantism generally, and became interested in Pantheism. His deep study of Virgil and Homer, he claimed, prevented him from becoming an atheist, and the majesty of the Catholic traditions, reinforced by his study of Tertullian's Apology informed him that if any form of Christianity were true it would be Roman Catholicism. The lovable, energetic, outgoing polymath had become quiet, reserved and reclusive: he publicly accepted the Catholic teachings and attended mass whenever he could, and Holy Communion on occasion. He died of heart failure at St. Vincent's Hospital, Melbourne, fortified by the last rites of the Church, and a funeral service was held at St. Brigit's Church, North Fitzroy.

== Recognition ==
- One of Lurgan College's four houses is named "Boulger" after their first headmaster.

== Family ==
Boulger married Elizabeth "Lizzie" Denham around June 1871. She was a daughter of Dr. John Denham, later President of the Royal College of Surgeons in Ireland.

His wife, Elizabeth, survived him. Apart from her membership of the Theosophical Society in its early days in Adelaide, little is known.

Of their children, nothing has yet come to light. One, unnamed, has been mentioned as an aspiring playwright.
