= David Sinclair =

David Sinclair may refer to:

- David Sinclair (footballer, born 1969), Scottish football player (Raith Rovers)
- David Sinclair (footballer, born 1990), Scottish football player
- David Sinclair (Numbers), a fictitious FBI agent in the TV series Numb3rs
- David Sinclair (politician), American politician
- David A. Sinclair (born 1969), Australian biologist
- David A. Sinclair (1874–1902), Scottish immigrant and secretary of the Dayton YMCA, namesake of Sinclair Community College
- Dave Sinclair (born 1947), keyboardist

== See also ==
- Sinclair (surname)
