= Jason Johnson (Australian footballer) =

Australian rules footballer, born 1978

Personal information
- Full name: Jason Johnson
- Born: 25 January 1978 (age 48)
- Original team: Assumption College / Calder U18
- Height: 182 cm (6 ft 0 in)
- Weight: 85 kg (187 lb)

Playing career
Years	Club	Games (Goals)
1997–2008	Essendon	184 (109)

Career highlights
- AFL premiership player: 2000; 2× W.S. Crichton Medal: 2001, 2005; All-Australian team: 2001; AFL Rising Star nominee: 1998

Jason Johnson (born 25 January 1978) is a retired Australian rules footballer who spent his entire professional career with Essendon of the Australian Football League (AFL).

Known as a tireless running midfielder, Johnson's career honours include All-Australian selection in 2001, the same year he won the W.S. Crichton Medal for Essendon's best and fairest player. In the same year, he was considered to be the best on ground in the famous Round 16 game between Essendon and North Melbourne in which Essendon came back from 69 points, a record comeback in VFL/AFL which remains to this day. In the game, he polled three Brownlow Medal votes, had 31 disposals, 13 clearances, 10 inside-50s, and kicked four goals. It is considered to be the best game of his career.

On 25 August 2008, Johnson and long-time teammate Adam Ramanauskas announced their intention to retire from football at the end of the 2008 AFL season.

Johnson now sits on the AFL Tribunal jury, adjudicating high-profile cases that arise during the regular season.

== Playing statistics ==
Season	Team	No.	Games	Totals							Averages (per game)						
Season	Team	No.	Games	G	B	K	H	D	M	T	G	B	K	H	D	M	T
1997	Essendon	42	3	0	2	17	13	30	1	3	0.0	0.7	5.7	4.3	10.0	0.3	1.0
1998	Essendon	42	8	2	0	55	29	84	22	9	0.3	0.0	6.9	3.6	10.5	2.8	1.1
1999	Essendon	14	4	0	1	22	11	33	5	2	0.0	0.3	5.5	2.8	8.3	1.3	0.5
2000	Essendon	14	25	14	20	317	151	468	79	53	0.6	0.8	12.7	6.0	18.7	3.2	2.1
2001	Essendon	14	24	21	19	364	162	526	85	64	0.9	0.8	15.2	6.8	21.9	3.5	2.7
2002	Essendon	14	24	14	15	324	196	520	95	86	0.6	0.6	13.5	8.2	21.7	4.0	3.6
2003	Essendon	14	22	15	13	315	159	474	105	50	0.7	0.6	14.3	7.2	21.5	4.8	2.3
2004	Essendon	14	19	14	16	277	173	450	91	57	0.7	0.8	14.6	9.1	23.7	4.8	3.0
2005	Essendon	14	22	12	11	308	183	491	120	80	0.5	0.5	14.0	8.3	22.3	5.5	3.6
2006	Essendon	14	19	12	7	237	173	410	111	47	0.6	0.4	12.5	9.1	21.6	5.8	2.5
2007	Essendon	14	10	3	6	119	88	207	64	30	0.3	0.6	11.9	8.8	20.7	6.4	3.0
2008	Essendon	14	4	2	0	44	47	91	22	9	0.5	0.0	11.0	11.8	22.8	5.5	2.3
Career			184	109	110	2399	1385	3784	800	490	0.6	0.6	13.0	7.5	20.6	4.3	2.7
