= Malcolm St. Clair =

Malcolm St. Clair may refer to:

- Malcolm St Clair (politician) (1927–2004), British farmer and Conservative Member of Parliament 1961–1963
- Malcolm St. Clair (filmmaker) (1897–1952), Hollywood film director, writer, producer and actor

== See also ==
- Malcolm Sinclair (disambiguation)
