= Donald Sinclair =

Donald Sinclair may refer to:

- Donald Sinclair (hotel owner) (1909–1981), inspiration for the television sitcom Fawlty Towers
- Donald Sinclair (veterinary surgeon) (1911–1995), inspiration for James Herriot's All Creatures Great and Small
- Donald Sinclair (Ontario politician) (1829–1900), Canadian politician
- Donald Sinclair (diplomat), former Canadian ambassador to Israel
- Donald Sinclair (American politician) (1899-1978), American farmer and politician
