= Andrew Sinclair (disambiguation) =

Andrew Sinclair (1935–2019) was a British novelist and polymath.

Andrew Sinclair may also refer to

- Andrew Sinclair (botanist) (1794–1861), British surgeon and botanist
- Andrew Sinclair (politician) (1861–1938), Australian politician
- Andrew Sinclair (privy counsellor) (1555–1625), Scottish-born Danish privy counsellor

== See also ==
- Sinclair (surname)
