= Michael Sinclair =

Michael or Mike Sinclair may refer to:

- Michael Sinclair (British Army officer) (1918–1944), British World War II officer, notable for being held captive in Colditz Castle
- Michael Sinclair (American football) (born 1968), retired American football player
- Michael Sinclair, pseudonym of Scottish diplomat and thriller writer Michael Shea
- Mike Sinclair (footballer) (1938–2017), English footballer (Grimsby Town)
