= George Sinclair =

George Sinclair may refer to:

- George Sinclair (footballer) (1884–1959), Scottish footballer
- George Sinclair (mercenary) (1580–1612), Scottish mercenary who saw action in Sweden
- George Sinclair (mathematician) (died 1696), Scottish mathematician
- Sir George Sinclair (politician) (1912–2005), British Member of Parliament for Dorking
- Sir George Sinclair, 2nd Baronet (1790–1868), British Member of Parliament for Caithness
- George Robertson Sinclair (1863–1917), cathedral organist and inspiration of one of Elgar's Enigma Variations
- George Sinclair (horticulturist) (1787–1834), gardener to the Duke of Bedford
- George Sinclair, 4th Earl of Caithness (died 1582), Scottish nobleman
- George Sinclair, 5th Earl of Caithness (died 1643), Scottish nobleman
- George Sinclair, 6th Earl of Caithness (died 1676), Scottish nobleman
- George Sinclair, 7th Earl of Caithness (died 1698), Scottish nobleman
- George Sinclair, 15th Earl of Caithness (1858–1889), Scottish aristocrat
- George Sinclair, the name of several Earls of Caithness
- George Brian Sinclair (1928–2020), British general
- George Sinclair, Lord Woodhall (c. 1700–1764), Scottish judge
