= Charles Sinclair =

Charles Sinclair or St Clair may refer to:

- Charles St Clair, 13th Lord Sinclair (1768–1863), Scottish noble and representative peer
- Charles St Clair, 17th Lord Sinclair (1914–2004), Scottish soldier, courtier and representative peer
- Charles Sinclair (businessman) (born 1948), British businessman
- Colin Sinclair (boxer) (Charles Colin Sinclair, born 1890), Australian Olympic boxer
- Charles T. Sinclair, American serial killer also known as the "Coin Shop Killer"
- Charles E. Sinclair (1828–1887), Virginia judge
- Charles Sinclair Jr., Jamaican politician
- Charlie St. Clair (1950–2026), American non-profit leader and politician, member of the New Hampshire House of Representatives
- Charles Sinclair, screenwriter of The Green Slime
- Charles Sinclair, character in Aces: Iron Eagle III
