= Ian Sinclair (broadcaster) =

- Occupation: Presenter
- Years active: 1986 – present
- Employer: TVNZ
- Known for: Sunday
- Awards: See Awards and nominations

Ian Sinclair is a New Zealand television journalist and reporter. He currently works as a reporter for New Zealand current affairs show Sunday.

== Awards and nominations ==
- 2000 - Asia 2000 Journalism Award (won)
- 2009 - Investigation of the Year (won)
