= William Saint-Clair =

William Saint Clair may refer to:

- William St. Clair (1410–1484 a.k.a. William Sinclair), 1st Earl of Caithness
- William St Clair of Roslin (1700–1778), of the Clan Sinclair, 21st Baron of Roslin
- William St Clair (1937–2021), British historian
- William St Clair Grant (cricketer) (1894–1918), Scottish cricketer and British Army officer
- William St Clair Grant (rugby union) (1853–1896), his father, Scottish rugby union player
- William St. Clair Tisdall (1859–1928), Anglican priest

== See also ==
- William Sinclair (disambiguation), as "Saint Clair" is an archaic variant of "Sinclair"
- Saint Clair (disambiguation)
- William (disambiguation)
- Clair (disambiguation)
