= Bouche of court =

Free food and drink at a royal court

The bouche of court, or vulgarly budge of court, is generally free food and drink at a royal court, or specifically the monarch's allowance of sustenance to their knights and servants during active duty. It is in the general sense that the French say, avoir bouche à la cour, literally "to have mouth at the court."

This privilege was sometimes only extended to bread, beer, and wine. It was an ancient custom not only in royal courts, but also in the houses of the nobility.
