= Laura Sinclair =

Laura Sinclair may refer to:

- Laura C. Sinclair, American optical physicist
- Laura Sinclair, fictional character in 1995 television episode "Dark Child" of The Outer Limits
- Laura Sinclair, fictional character in 1997 television soap opera series Pacific Palisades
- Laura Sinclair, fictional character in 2005 supernatural slasher film Venom

== See also ==
- Laurent Sinclair, French new wave musician
