= Alison Sinclair (author) =

British physician

Alison Sinclair (born 1959) is a British writer of science fiction, resident in Canada. She is the author of the Darkborn trilogy of novels and other works and is a medical doctor.

== Novels ==
- Legacies (1995)
- Blueheart (1996)
- Cavalcade (1998)
- Throne Price (with Lynda Williams, 2001)

=== Darkborn Trilogy ===
- Darkborn (2009)
- Lightborn (2010)
- Shadowborn (2011)

=== Plague Confederacy ===
- Breakpoint: Nereis (2014)
- Contagion: Eyre (2015)
