= Thomas E. Clouston =

Thomas Edward Clouston (21 April 1848 – 26 August 1913) was an Irish-born Presbyterian minister and academic in New South Wales.

== History ==
Clouston was born in Dublin, descended from an old Orkney family of Presbyterians, of whom two were successive ministers of Stromness, in Mainland, Orkney, whose combined pastorates covered a period of over a century, probably some kind of record. Clouston received his early education under Rev. W. F. Stevenson, D.D., of Rathgar. He graduated B.A. at Trinity College, Dublin, in 1872, and had his theological training at the Presbyterian Assembly's College at Belfast.

In 1873 E. V. Boulger, headmaster of the newly founded Lurgan College appointed Clouston Mathematics master. It is likely they knew each other from Trinity College, and Clouston's time there may have been no longer than that of Boulger, who left when Lurgan began applying financial stringencies.

He was licensed by the Presbytery of Dublin in 1875, and served at the Presbyterian church at Portaferry, County Down 1875–1880.

He migrated to Sydney in 1881 for the benefit of his health, and was inducted into the pastorate of Penrith, which at that time extended from Blacktown to Mount Victoria, a distance of some 90 km. Around 1891 he was called to the Church at Glebe, where he ministered for 20 years, building up the church until it was one of the most influential in the State. He developed the Sunday School and Fellowship Association, and his kindly and conscientious example influenced many young men to join the ministry, among them being Dr. E. N. Merrington, Rev. W. G. Sharpe, Rev. Chas. Whyte, Rev. G. Logan, Rev. Donald McKay Barnett, Rev. J. A. Perkins, and Rev. J. Edwards While at Glebe, Clouston was

- appointed Moderator of the State Presbyterian Assembly in 1890
- bestowed with the degree of Doctor of Divinity from the Theological Faculty of the Presbyterian Church in Ireland in 1901
- elected Moderator of the General Assembly of Australia in 1906
- convener of the Home Missions Committee of the Presbyterian Church
- appointed lecturer in Historical Theology at St. Andrew's College, which he performed for 16 years, then was appointed Professor of New Testament Theology and Church History at St. Andrews.

He resigned from the Glebe church in 1909. Clouston was an advocate of Presbyterian church union, and maintained a close fellowship with other churches - Anglican, Methodist, Congregational, and Baptist in such endeavors as the YMCA, Evangelistic Council, United Missions and the Home Mission and "never had a spark of sectarianism in his heart". For 20 years he actively supported the Ragged School movement and for the last six years of his life he was chairman of the committee. He was a prominent temperance advocate, a vice-president of the New South Wales Alliance, and acted president during the illness of Archdeacon Boyce.

He died after a few weeks' illness and his remains were taken via Mortuary station to the Presbyterian section of Rookwood Cemetery.

== Family ==
Clouston married Rachel Welsh (5 August 1848 – 28 December 1888), of Kircubbin, Ireland, on 21 August 1877. They had four children

- Dr. Thomas Bennett Clouston, of Tumut
- Mary Clouston (4 July 1882 – ) married cricketer Percy William Dive (10 July 1881 – 17 September 1965) on 16 November 1909
- Miss L. Clouston (25 March 1884 – )
- Rachel Clouston (3 April 1888 – 1965) married John Hogan Farrell c. 1938

He married again, to the widow Mary E. McKaugham on 11 September 1894; their children were:

- Lieut. Edgar Boyd Clouston (21 September 1892 – 26 September 1917) a WWI casualty.
- Kathleen Clouston (2 November 1898 – ) married John H. Cunningham on 12 January 1925

They had a residence "Seatondale", Milton Street, Ashfield, New South Wales.
