= Bruce Sinclair =

Bruce Sinclair may refer to:

- Bruce Sinclair (rugby league) (born 1965), Australian rugby league player
- Bruce Sinclair (politician), Etobicoke councillor and mayor, 1984–1993; Toronto city councillor, 1998–2000
