= Jim Sinclair (footballer) =

Australian rules footballer

Personal information
- Full name: James Morgan Sinclair
- Born: 14 May 1907; Richmond, Victoria
- Died: 9 September 2005 (aged 98); Ringwood, Victoria
- Original team: Deepdene
- Height: 166 cm (5 ft 5 in)
- Weight: 66 kg (146 lb)
- Position: Forward

Playing career^{1}
Years	Club	Games (Goals)
1927	Hawthorn	6 (5)
1929	Yarraville (VFA)	3 (5)
1929–34	Williamstown (VFA)	79 (109)
- ^{1} Playing statistics correct to the end of 1927.

James Morgan Sinclair (14 May 1907 – 9 September 2005) was an Australian rules footballer who played with Hawthorn in the Victorian Football League (VFL).

Joining Hawthorn from Montrose at the start of the 1927 VFL season, Sinclair played 6 games (all losses) in his first season at the club. He did not make a senior appearance in 1928 and at the start of the 1929 season transferred to Yarraville.
