= William Clouston =

William Clouston may refer to:

- William Alexander Clouston (1843–1896), British folklorist
- William Clouston (politician), British politician, leader of the Social Democratic Party from 2018 to 2026
