= Rob Sinclair (footballer, born 1974) =

English footballer

Personal information
- Full name: Robert Sinclair
- Date of birth: 9 April 1974 (age 52)
- Place of birth: Greenwich, England
- Position: Forward

Senior career*
Years	Team	Apps	(Gls)
1991–1992	Maidstone United	1	(0)
- Dagenham & Redbridge
- * Club domestic league appearances and goals

Robert Sinclair (born 9 April 1974) is a former professional footballer who played in The Football League for Maidstone United.
