= Malcolm Sinclair =

Malcolm Sinclair may refer to:

- Malcolm Sinclair (Swedish nobleman) (1690–1739), whose assassination caused the Russo–Swedish War of 1741–1743
- Malcolm Sinclair, 20th Earl of Caithness (born 1948), British politician and member of the House of Lords
- Malcolm Sinclair (actor) (born 1950), English stage and television actor and president of Equity trade union

== See also ==
- Malcolm St. Clair (disambiguation)
