= Emma Sinclair =

British businessperson

Emma Sinclair is a British businesswoman, entrepreneur and journalist.

== Early life and education ==
Sinclair was born in Middlesex and currently splits her time between New York and London. She is descended from Jewish migrants to the United Kingdom.

While still at sixth form at Haberdashers' School for Girls, she worked at McDonald's. Sinclair graduated from The University of Leeds in 1998 with a BA in French, Spanish and Italian.

On leaving university, Sinclair joined a graduate training programme at Rothschild & Co in investment banking.

== Career ==
In 2005, age 29, Sinclair became the youngest person in the UK to take a company public after the property investment company Mission Capital floated on the Alternative Investment Market. In 2008, Sinclair was forced out of her public company Mission Capital and lost her subsequent High Court reinstatement fight.

In 2012, Sinclair began writing the Wonder Woman column for The Daily Telegraph. She has since written for The Guardian, Financial Times and The Wall Street Journal and commented on business, entrepreneurship, politics, diversity and innovation on Sunrise, ITN, Channel 4 and Channel 5. Sinclair continues to comment on international politics and advocate entrepreneurship to the UK overseas.

In 2014, Sinclair co-founded EnterpriseJungle, which rebranded to EnterpriseAlumni in 2017.

In December 2016, she travelled to Delhi with Prime Minister Teresa May, James Dyson and British Indian entrepreneur Baron Bilimoria to meet Indian Prime Minister Narendra Modi to help promote better relationships between the UK and India.

== Philanthropy ==
Sinclair has been a UNICEF advisor since 2014,

In 2022 in response to the 2022 Ukrainian refugee crisis, she gathered a consortium of over 200 companies to help provide english language training, resettlement skills, recertification and job opportunities for refugees arriving in the UK at scale with RefuAid. The first pilot was announced in March 2022 with sponsors such as PWC and PageGroup.

== Honours and awards ==
In 2016, Sinclair was awarded an MBE for Services To Entrepreneurship.
