= Mike Sinclair (footballer) =

English footballer

Personal information
- Full name: Michael John Sinclair
- Date of birth: 13 October 1938
- Place of birth: Grimsby, England
- Date of death: 12 May 2017 (aged 78)
- Place of death: Grimsby, England
- Position: Forward

Senior career*
Years	Team	Apps	(Gls)
1957–1961	Grimsby Town	6	(1)
1961-1961	Ards F.C. (loan)	9	(5)
- * Club domestic league appearances and goals

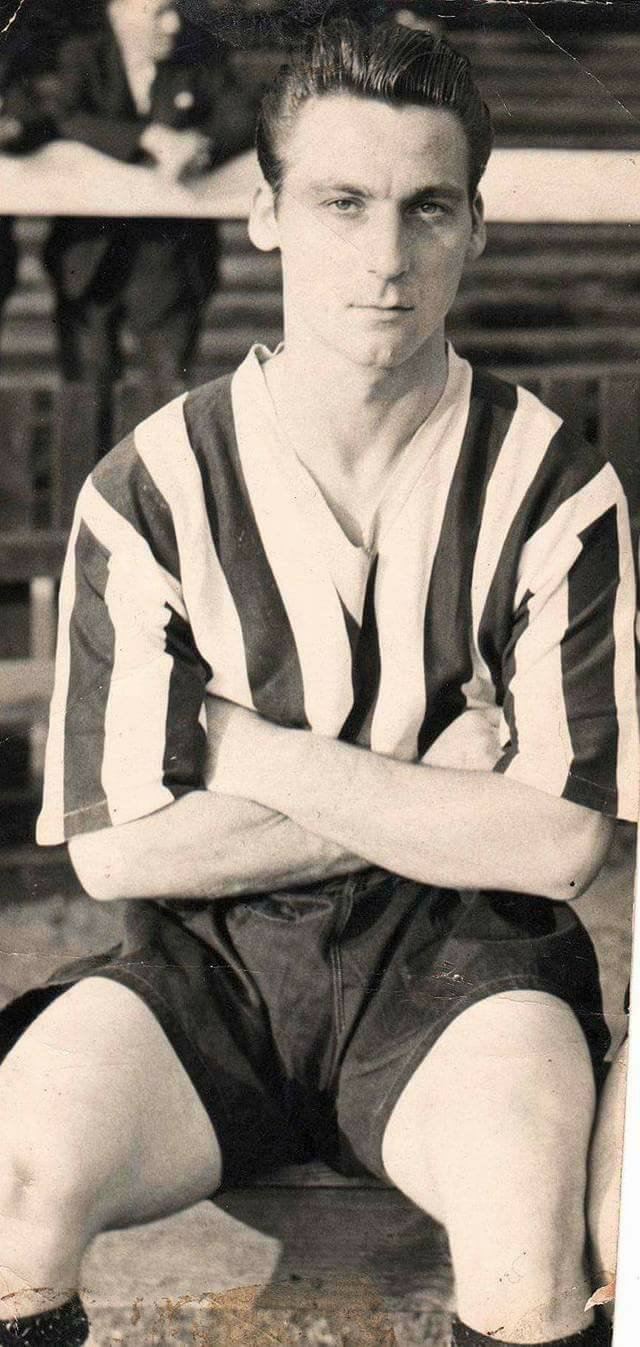
Mike Sinclair, Grimsby Town FC

Michael John Sinclair (13 October 1938 – 12 May 2017) was an English professional footballer who played as a forward in the Football League for Grimsby Town and Irish League for Ards F.C.

Mike, who was related to Alec Hall (Grimsby Town's Division One team), played in Ronald Humpston's Grimsby Town colts and juniors teams during the managerial reigns of Bill Shankly, Elemér Berkessy, and Billy Walsh; and represented the Lincolnshire County FA in the FA Youth Cup from 1954 to 1956. Mike scored a hat-trick in the FA Youth Cup in a 7-2 win versus Nottinghamshire at the famous Appleby-Frodingham ground in Lincolnshire on 12 October 1956.

He made his Football League debut on 26 April 1958 in a Division Two home fixture versus Bristol Rovers. Mike, who was an apprentice motor fitter, was Grimsby Town Reserves' top goalscorer in the Midland League during the 1957-58 season with 21 goals. Grimsby Town manager Allenby Chilton rewarded him with his full debut where he replaced legendary Grimsby striker Tommy Briggs at centre-forward. Grimsby won 3-2 with Mike scoring a spectacular equaliser and setting up the winner for Ron Rafferty.

Mike idolised Billy Cairns, the Newcastle United and Grimsby Town centre-forward, and cleaned his boots before Grimsby home games. But it was his strike partner Tommy Briggs who Mike was most likened to. Before his league debut in April 1958, the Grimsby Evening Telegraph described Mike as being "quick and powerful in that tearaway style. Apart from his goal-opportunist qualities, Sinclair is a "chaser" type of forward and is always on the search for openings". The Sunderland Echo mentioned Mike in an article on 17 May 1958 entitled 'Allenby Chilton: Man behind Grimsby come-back' saying "in only one game Sinclair gave a hint that he might follow in the footsteps of Briggs and Glover as a great goal-scoring leader".

Mike turned down full-time terms with Grimsby Town at the end of the 1957-1958 season to enable him to finish his apprenticeship at S.P. Commercials in Grimsby. He made no league appearances during the 1958-1959 season, which saw Grimsby relegated to Division Three and the departure of manager Allenby Chilton, but scored the winning goal for Grimsby Town "A" team versus Grimsby Borough Police in the final of the Lincolnshire League Challenge Cup.

He returned to the first-team during the 1959-1960 season under the caretaker management of first-team trainer Bill Lampton; making three appearances in October 1959, all in away fixtures. Mike was selected to make his 1st home league appearance of the season versus QPR, also in October, but was injured working in his trade so did not play. This led to Mike agreeing full-time terms with the club. He made no further first-team appearances during the season - there were no substitutes until the 1965-1966 season - but continued as understudy to prolific Grimsby Town goalscorer Ron Rafferty.

Mike was retained as a full-time professional footballer under new manager Tim Ward and played his final games for Grimsby Town in September 1960 in a Division Three home win versus Reading United and an away draw versus Coventry City, both in the inside-left position. He was called up for National Service, the final intake of men before the UK scheme was scrapped in 1960, and was posted to Northern Ireland for two years.

He made his Irish League debut for Ards F.C. under manager Tommy Ewing on 25 April 1961 in a home fixture versus Bangor F.C. Ards won 4-2 with Mike scoring on his debut. Grimsby Town had agreed loan terms with Ards in a season that saw them finish 3rd in the league behind champions Linfield. Jackie Scott (Johnny), who played for Grimsby Town, Manchester United and Northern Ireland, had recommended Mike to Ards. He did not settle at Ards, during his military service in Northern Ireland, and scored on his final appearance for the club on 18 September 1961 in a Gold Cup defeat away to Glentoran. Less than a year before, Tommy Briggs was player-manager of Glentoran; his last club before retiring from professional football. During this time, Mike lined-up against Tommy in a friendly match in Northern Ireland. The previous time they met on a football field they were strike partners for Grimsby Town Reserves.

Mike won a British Army athletics title (Northern Ireland) in 1961 and was de-mobbed in 1962. He returned to his trade and played semi-professional football and cricket for Ross Group in Grimsby, Lincolnshire, throughout the 1960s. Mike worked as an engineer for Ross Foods until his retirement in 1999.

In December 2024, Mike was posthumously presented the GTFC Heritage Certificate in recognition of his goal-scoring league debut in 1958. These certificates, along with a pin badge, are presented to every single former Grimsby Town player who has played at least one professional game for the club since its birth in 1878. All of the current squad received one of these certificates and a pin badge. For former-players who are no longer with us, their official certificates are gifted to their families. The certificates note the player’s names, their heritage number as well as their debut game with an embossed Heritage logo. Mike is player #670 for the club.
