= Peter Sinclair =

Peter Sinclair may refer to:

== Politics ==
- Peter Sinclair (governor) (born 1934), Rear admiral, first commandant of ADFA, Governor of New South Wales
- Peter Sinclair Sr. (1819–1906), Canadian Member of Parliament for Queen's County, 1873–1878
- Peter Sinclair Jr. (1887–1938), Canadian Member of Parliament for Queen's, 1935–1938

== Others ==
- Peter Sinclair (broadcaster) (1938–2001), New Zealand television personality
- Peter J. N. Sinclair (1946–2020), British economist
- Peter Sinclair (environmental activist) (born 1953), American climate and environmentalist videographer
- Peter Sinclair (footballer) (born 1947), Australian football player
- Pete Sinclair (writer), British radio and television writer
