= Gerard Sinclair =

Gerard Sinclair was Chief Executive of the Scottish Criminal Cases Review Commission (SCCRC).

== Background ==
Gerard Sinclair is qualified in both Scots law and English law. As a solicitor in private practice for 19 years, and a senior partner with a Glasgow law firm, his legal experience covered all areas of criminal, civil and commercial litigation. He has served as a member of the Council of the Law Society of Scotland and is also involved on the Law Society Criminal Law Committee. In May 2006 he was appointed a part-time sheriff.

== SCCRC ==
Gerard Sinclair became the SCCRC's Chief Executive on 30 June 2003. He is responsible for the day-to-day management of the Commission, and for ensuring the efficient and expeditious progressing of the Commission's cases. The SCCRC conducted a review of the conviction of Abdelbaset al-Megrahi in the Pan Am Flight 103 bombing trial and in 2007 referred the case back to the High Court of Justiciary for a fresh appeal.
