= 2001 AFL season =

105th season of the Australian Football League (AFL)

2001 AFL premiership season
- Teams: 16
- Premiers: Brisbane Lions; 1st premiership
- Minor premiers: Essendon; 17th minor premiership
- Pre-season cup: Port Adelaide; 1st pre-season cup win
- Brownlow Medallist: Jason Akermanis (Brisbane Lions)
- Leading goalkicker: Matthew Lloyd (Essendon)

Attendance
- Matches played: 185
- Total attendance: 6,447,560 (34,852 per match)
- Highest: 91,482 (Grand Final, Brisbane Lions vs. Essendon)

The 2001 AFL season was the 105th season of the Australian Football League (AFL), the highest level senior Australian rules football competition in Australia. The season featured sixteen clubs, ran from 30 March until 29 September, and comprised a 22-game home-and-away season followed by a finals series featuring the top eight clubs.

The premiership was won by the Brisbane Lions for the first time, after it defeated Essendon by 26 points in the AFL Grand Final.

== AFL Draft ==
See 2001 AFL draft.

== Ansett Australia Cup ==
Port Adelaide defeated the Brisbane Lions 17.9 (111) to 3.8 (26) in the grand final.

== Premiership season ==
=== Round 1 ===
Home team	Score	Away team	Score	Venue	Attendance	Date
Kangaroos	9.7 (61)	Essendon	23.8 (146)	MCG	56,028	Friday, 30 March
Hawthorn	13.7 (85)	Collingwood	11.15 (81)	MCG	52,190	Saturday, 31 March
Fremantle	18.10 (118)	Carlton	18.11 (119)	Subiaco Oval	23,716	Saturday, 31 March
Western Bulldogs	16.11 (107)	St Kilda	16.16 (112)	Colonial Stadium	30,047	Saturday, 31 March
Port Adelaide	14.15 (99)	Brisbane Lions	14.9 (93)	Football Park	25,948	Saturday, 31 March
Geelong	17.13 (115)	West Coast	7.7 (49)	Shell Stadium	20,149	Sunday, 1 April
Melbourne	15.13 (103)	Richmond	20.14 (134)	MCG	44,466	Sunday, 1 April
Sydney	19.12 (126)	Adelaide	10.14 (74)	SCG	31,174	Sunday, 1 April

=== Round 2 ===
Home team	Score	Away team	Score	Venue	Attendance	Date
Essendon	23.7 (145)	Port Adelaide	16.11 (107)	Colonial Stadium	34,918	Friday, 6 April
Carlton	11.15 (81)	Hawthorn	16.11 (107)	Optus Oval	27,597	Saturday, 7 April
Richmond	9.15 (69)	Western Bulldogs	17.9 (111)	MCG	36,427	Saturday, 7 April
Collingwood	15.15 (105)	Fremantle	13.10 (88)	Colonial Stadium	26,067	Saturday, 7 April
Adelaide	11.14 (80)	Melbourne	12.11 (83)	Football Park	35,653	Saturday, 7 April
Brisbane Lions	17.16 (118)	Kangaroos	8.10 (58)	Gabba	22,970	Sunday, 8 April
St Kilda	13.8 (86)	Geelong	17.13 (115)	Colonial Stadium	33,867	Sunday, 8 April
West Coast	13.11 (89)	Sydney	15.14 (104)	Subiaco Oval	32,673	Sunday, 8 April

=== Round 3 ===
Home team	Score	Away team	Score	Venue	Attendance	Date
Carlton	14.9 (93)	Essendon	11.10 (76)	MCG	63,088	Thursday, 12 April
Richmond	17.14 (116)	Brisbane Lions	14.10 (94)	MCG	31,688	Saturday, 14 April
Western Bulldogs	12.9 (81)	Collingwood	23.15 (153)	Colonial Stadium	37,598	Saturday, 14 April
Kangaroos	11.5 (71)	Sydney	23.13 (151)	SCG	22,395	Saturday, 14 April
Adelaide	13.10 (88)	Port Adelaide	23.15 (153)	Football Park	40,296	Sunday, 15 April
St Kilda	16.11 (107)	West Coast	19.11 (125)	Colonial Stadium	19,496	Sunday, 15 April
Fremantle	8.11 (59)	Hawthorn	11.16 (82)	Subiaco Oval	20,703	Sunday, 15 April
Melbourne	18.16 (124)	Geelong	15.14 (104)	MCG	48,551	Monday, 16 April

=== Round 4 ===
Home team	Score	Away team	Score	Venue	Attendance	Date
Collingwood	10.11 (71)	Richmond	13.8 (86)	MCG	78,638	Friday, 20 April
Sydney	6.19 (55)	Essendon	15.12 (102)	SCG	40,131	Friday, 20 April
Carlton	8.5 (53)	Adelaide	9.8 (62)	Optus Oval	21,110	Saturday, 21 April
Western Bulldogs	21.14 (140)	Brisbane Lions	12.15 (87)	Colonial Stadium	20,322	Saturday, 21 April
Fremantle	13.10 (88)	West Coast	16.16 (112)	Subiaco Oval	38,804	Saturday, 21 April
Port Adelaide	17.12 (114)	St Kilda	7.8 (50)	Football Park	27,017	Saturday, 21 April
Geelong	4.9 (33)	Kangaroos	7.11 (53)	Shell Stadium	14,298	Sunday, 22 April
Hawthorn	11.17 (83)	Melbourne	5.14 (44)	MCG	30,113	Sunday, 22 April

=== Round 5 ===
Home team	Score	Away team	Score	Venue	Attendance	Date
Essendon	15.13 (103)	Collingwood	14.11 (95)	MCG	83,905	Wednesday, 25 April
West Coast	11.4 (70)	Richmond	17.7 (109)	Subiaco Oval	38,424	Friday, 27 April
Carlton	17.23 (125)	St Kilda	14.8 (92)	Optus Oval	24,385	Saturday, 28 April
Western Bulldogs	19.12 (126)	Hawthorn	24.11 (155)	Colonial Stadium	34,400	Saturday, 28 April
Adelaide	12.18 (90)	Kangaroos	10.15 (75)	Football Park	37,596	Saturday, 28 April
Brisbane Lions	25.21 (171)	Fremantle	19.8 (122)	Gabba	20,059	Sunday, 29 April
Geelong	15.12 (102)	Port Adelaide	23.10 (148)	Shell Stadium	18,736	Sunday, 29 April
Melbourne	18.11 (119)	Sydney	15.14 (104)	MCG	31,168	Sunday, 29 April

=== Round 6 ===
Home team	Score	Away team	Score	Venue	Attendance	Date
Kangaroos	12.6 (78)	Richmond	19.15 (129)	Colonial Stadium	39,773	Friday, 4 May
St Kilda	18.12 (120)	Sydney	14.10 (94)	Colonial Stadium	28,933	Saturday, 5 May
Fremantle	9.20 (74)	Melbourne	18.11 (119)	Subiaco Oval	19,775	Saturday, 5 May
Port Adelaide	20.9 (129)	Western Bulldogs	13.8 (86)	Football Park	30,197	Saturday, 5 May
Brisbane Lions	17.14 (116)	Geelong	8.13 (61)	Gabba	25,881	Saturday, 5 May
Collingwood	15.13 (103)	Carlton	14.11 (95)	MCG	73,572	Sunday, 6 May
Essendon	24.14 (158)	West Coast	10.10 (70)	Colonial Stadium	33,829	Sunday, 6 May
Hawthorn	16.8 (104)	Adelaide	12.19 (91)	York Park	17,460	Sunday, 6 May

=== Round 7 ===
Home team	Score	Away team	Score	Venue	Attendance	Date
Melbourne	12.5 (77)	Western Bulldogs	15.17 (107)	MCG	32,299	Friday, 11 May
Richmond	10.14 (74)	Essendon	16.24 (120)	MCG	77,576	Saturday, 12 May
St Kilda	15.9 (99)	Hawthorn	16.14 (110)	Colonial Stadium	37,940	Saturday, 12 May
Adelaide	14.19 (103)	Fremantle	12.11 (83)	Football Park	38,292	Saturday, 12 May
Collingwood	14.13 (97)	Kangaroos	15.9 (99)	Colonial Stadium	34,600	Sunday, 13 May
Geelong	9.14 (68)	Carlton	17.6 (108)	MCG	29,150	Sunday, 13 May
Sydney	12.8 (80)	Brisbane Lions	15.22 (112)	SCG	22,390	Sunday, 13 May
West Coast	7.8 (50)	Port Adelaide	17.19 (121)	Subiaco Oval	28,026	Sunday, 13 May

=== Round 8 ===
Home team	Score	Away team	Score	Venue	Attendance	Date
Richmond	14.8 (92)	Adelaide	17.18 (120)	MCG	29,073	Friday, 18 May
Carlton	21.16 (142)	Brisbane Lions	9.14 (68)	Optus Oval	21,997	Saturday, 19 May
Hawthorn	21.12 (138)	West Coast	8.10 (58)	MCG	22,988	Saturday, 19 May
Kangaroos	19.24 (138)	St Kilda	13.11 (89)	Manuka Oval	10,958	Saturday, 19 May
Port Adelaide	16.14 (110)	Collingwood	18.11 (119)	Football Park	34,232	Saturday, 19 May
Melbourne	11.13 (79)	Essendon	12.13 (85)	MCG	47,452	Sunday, 20 May
Western Bulldogs	18.14 (122)	Sydney	15.11 (101)	SCG	22,874	Sunday, 20 May
Fremantle	10.13 (73)	Geelong	14.11 (95)	Subiaco Oval	20,231	Sunday, 20 May

=== Round 9 ===
Home team	Score	Away team	Score	Venue	Attendance	Date
Kangaroos	10.9 (69)	Carlton	12.10 (82)	MCG	43,624	Friday, 25 May
Collingwood	14.14 (98)	St Kilda	12.8 (80)	MCG	49,937	Saturday, 26 May
West Coast	11.11 (77)	Western Bulldogs	18.17 (125)	Subiaco Oval	30,063	Saturday, 26 May
Brisbane Lions	18.14 (122)	Adelaide	19.13 (127)	Gabba	24,122	Saturday, 26 May
Essendon	18.14 (122)	Hawthorn	8.9 (57)	Colonial Stadium	50,701	Saturday, 26 May
Port Adelaide	13.10 (88)	Melbourne	9.14 (68)	Football Park	22,423	Sunday, 27 May
Geelong	17.16 (118)	Richmond	11.10 (76)	Shell Stadium	27,421	Sunday, 27 May
Sydney	12.12 (84)	Fremantle	10.5 (65)	SCG	20,611	Sunday, 27 May

=== Round 10 ===
Home team	Score	Away team	Score	Venue	Attendance	Date
Western Bulldogs	11.13 (79)	Kangaroos	19.11 (125)	Colonial Stadium	32,793	Friday, 1 June
Carlton	21.23 (149)	West Coast	3.12 (30)	Optus Oval	19,757	Saturday, 2 June
Hawthorn	10.13 (73)	Port Adelaide	17.14 (116)	MCG	28,228	Saturday, 2 June
St Kilda	17.11 (113)	Melbourne	22.12 (144)	Colonial Stadium	30,497	Saturday, 2 June
Brisbane Lions	15.12 (102)	Essendon	10.14 (74)	Gabba	36,149	Saturday, 2 June
Adelaide	9.12 (66)	Geelong	8.7 (55)	Football Park	40,466	Sunday, 3 June
Collingwood	7.13 (55)	Sydney	11.7 (73)	Colonial Stadium	42,640	Sunday, 3 June
Fremantle	6.10 (46)	Richmond	12.12 (84)	Subiaco Oval	19,626	Sunday, 3 June

=== Round 11 ===
Home team	Score	Away team	Score	Venue	Attendance	Date
St Kilda	13.8 (86)	Essendon	19.14 (128)	Colonial Stadium	40,075	Friday, 8 June
Geelong	14.9 (93)	Hawthorn	13.12 (90)	Colonial Stadium	37,526	Saturday, 9 June
West Coast	9.8 (62)	Brisbane Lions	11.18 (84)	Subiaco Oval	25,588	Saturday, 9 June
Adelaide	14.13 (97)	Western Bulldogs	19.13 (127)	Football Park	38,829	Saturday, 9 June
Kangaroos	23.16 (154)	Fremantle	10.8 (68)	Colonial Stadium	18,023	Sunday, 10 June
Richmond	13.10 (88)	Carlton	8.13 (61)	MCG	71,767	Sunday, 10 June
Sydney	18.17 (125)	Port Adelaide	10.18 (78)	SCG	28,187	Sunday, 10 June
Melbourne	8.9 (57)	Collingwood	19.20 (134)	MCG	62,761	Monday, 11 June

=== Round 12 ===
Home team	Score	Away team	Score	Venue	Attendance	Date
Essendon	18.14 (122)	Adelaide	11.7 (73)	Colonial Stadium	38,816	Friday, 15 June
Geelong	13.9 (87)	Western Bulldogs	15.4 (94)	Shell Stadium	22,771	Saturday, 16 June
Fremantle	11.14 (80)	St Kilda	12.18 (90)	Subiaco Oval	19,857	Saturday, 16 June
Melbourne	14.15 (99)	Brisbane Lions	23.10 (148)	Gabba	23,740	Sunday, 17 June
Collingwood	26.17 (173)	West Coast	14.8 (92)	Colonial Stadium	36,589	Friday, 22 June
Hawthorn	15.11 (101)	Kangaroos	14.14 (98)	MCG	41,295	Saturday, 23 June
Richmond	12.14 (86)	Sydney	8.12 (60)	Colonial Stadium	37,196	Saturday, 23 June
Port Adelaide	10.10 (70)	Carlton	15.14 (104)	Football Park	35,805	Sunday, 24 June

=== Round 13 ===
Home team	Score	Away team	Score	Venue	Attendance	Date
Brisbane Lions	20.20 (140)	Hawthorn	8.5 (53)	Gabba	30,573	Friday, 29 June
Carlton	23.15 (153)	Western Bulldogs	13.14 (92)	Optus Oval	30,067	Saturday, 30 June
Essendon	18.10 (118)	Fremantle	10.12 (72)	Colonial Stadium	29,528	Saturday, 30 June
Kangaroos	14.11 (95)	Port Adelaide	10.13 (73)	Manuka Oval	10,030	Saturday, 30 June
Adelaide	14.13 (97)	Collingwood	15.9 (99)	Football Park	39,010	Saturday, 30 June
St Kilda	13.9 (87)	Richmond	19.12 (126)	Colonial Stadium	40,783	Sunday, 1 July
Sydney	9.11 (65)	Geelong	12.12 (84)	SCG	26,760	Sunday, 1 July
West Coast	15.5 (95)	Melbourne	13.10 (88)	Subiaco Oval	29,783	Sunday, 1 July

=== Round 14 ===
Home team	Score	Away team	Score	Venue	Attendance	Date
Western Bulldogs	11.10 (76)	Essendon	24.10 (154)	Colonial Stadium	48,728	Friday, 6 July
Richmond	10.11 (71)	Hawthorn	20.9 (129)	MCG	52,189	Saturday, 7 July
Adelaide	8.16 (64)	West Coast	7.9 (51)	Football Park	31,534	Saturday, 7 July
Brisbane Lions	17.17 (119)	St Kilda	9.8 (62)	Gabba	22,911	Saturday, 7 July
Geelong	16.15 (111)	Collingwood	14.9 (93)	Colonial Stadium	50,160	Sunday, 8 July
Melbourne	13.15 (93)	Kangaroos	18.13 (121)	MCG	27,464	Sunday, 8 July
Sydney	12.19 (91)	Carlton	12.9 (81)	SCG	30,488	Sunday, 8 July
Fremantle	11.5 (71)	Port Adelaide	25.13 (163)	Subiaco Oval	15,961	Sunday, 8 July

=== Round 15 ===
Home team	Score	Away team	Score	Venue	Attendance	Date
St Kilda	9.5 (59)	Adelaide	23.18 (156)	Colonial Stadium	26,560	Friday, 13 July
Carlton	16.15 (111)	Melbourne	18.9 (117)	Optus Oval	23,901	Saturday, 14 July
Hawthorn	11.11 (77)	Sydney	14.14 (98)	MCG	34,394	Saturday, 14 July
Western Bulldogs	16.23 (119)	Fremantle	11.19 (85)	Colonial Stadium	15,111	Saturday, 14 July
Port Adelaide	14.12 (96)	Richmond	7.10 (52)	Football Park	26,773	Saturday, 14 July
Collingwood	16.7 (103)	Brisbane Lions	19.15 (129)	MCG	45,016	Sunday, 15 July
Essendon	19.13 (127)	Geelong	17.10 (112)	Colonial Stadium	48,152	Sunday, 15 July
West Coast	17.8 (110)	Kangaroos	24.10 (154)	Subiaco Oval	34,259	Sunday, 15 July

=== Round 16 ===
Home team	Score	Away team	Score	Venue	Attendance	Date
Richmond	19.13 (127)	Melbourne	12.14 (86)	MCG	37,938	Friday, 20 July
Carlton	19.17 (131)	Fremantle	8.8 (56)	Optus Oval	15,622	Saturday, 21 July
Collingwood	14.5 (89)	Hawthorn	21.18 (144)	MCG	52,381	Saturday, 21 July
St Kilda	12.6 (78)	Western Bulldogs	16.16 (112)	Colonial Stadium	21,665	Saturday, 21 July
Brisbane Lions	13.16 (94)	Port Adelaide	8.12 (60)	Gabba	29,547	Saturday, 21 July
Adelaide	7.14 (56)	Sydney	16.9 (105)	Football Park	46,852	Sunday, 22 July
Essendon	27.9 (171)	Kangaroos	25.9 (159)	MCG	51,878	Sunday, 22 July
West Coast	12.8 (80)	Geelong	22.18 (150)	Subiaco Oval	31,456	Sunday, 22 July

=== Round 17 ===
Home team	Score	Away team	Score	Venue	Attendance	Date
Western Bulldogs	15.10 (100)	Richmond	15.12 (102)	Colonial Stadium	43,595	Friday, 27 July
Geelong	12.6 (78)	St Kilda	10.6 (66)	Shell Stadium	22,414	Saturday, 28 July
Melbourne	12.12 (84)	Adelaide	15.10 (100)	MCG	17,566	Saturday, 28 July
Fremantle	13.12 (90)	Collingwood	19.5 (119)	Subiaco Oval	20,498	Saturday, 28 July
Kangaroos	18.7 (115)	Brisbane Lions	21.10 (136)	Colonial Stadium	26,776	Saturday, 28 July
Port Adelaide	15.14 (104)	Essendon	14.13 (97)	Football Park	37,930	Sunday, 29 July
Hawthorn	15.6 (96)	Carlton	13.15 (93)	MCG	52,472	Sunday, 29 July
Sydney	11.17 (83)	West Coast	6.12 (48)	SCG	20,669	Sunday, 29 July

=== Round 18 ===
Home team	Score	Away team	Score	Venue	Attendance	Date
Richmond	10.11 (71)	Collingwood	6.15 (51)	MCG	69,930	Friday, 3 August
Geelong	15.10 (100)	Melbourne	16.7 (103)	MCG	31,074	Saturday, 4 August
Hawthorn	13.12 (90)	Fremantle	16.10 (106)	Colonial Stadium	16,595	Saturday, 4 August
Sydney	22.11 (143)	Kangaroos	3.18 (36)	SCG	32,689	Saturday, 4 August
Port Adelaide	16.11 (107)	Adelaide	15.9 (99)	Football Park	49,846	Sunday, 5 August
Brisbane Lions	19.22 (136)	Western Bulldogs	15.13 (103)	Gabba	26,872	Sunday, 5 August
Essendon	14.11 (95)	Carlton	16.6 (102)	MCG	75,873	Sunday, 5 August
West Coast	26.15 (171)	St Kilda	12.7 (79)	Subiaco Oval	31,358	Sunday, 5 August

Fremantle claimed their first win of the season in their match against Hawthorn.

=== Round 19 ===
Home team	Score	Away team	Score	Venue	Attendance	Date
Kangaroos	21.5 (131)	Geelong	12.10 (82)	Colonial Stadium	30,919	Friday, 10 August
St Kilda	16.18 (114)	Port Adelaide	19.11 (125)	Colonial Stadium	14,018	Saturday, 11 August
Melbourne	10.11 (71)	Hawthorn	24.12 (156)	MCG	26,632	Saturday, 11 August
Adelaide	16.10 (106)	Carlton	8.5 (53)	Football Park	44,542	Saturday, 11 August
Brisbane Lions	19.14 (128)	Richmond	15.7 (97)	Gabba	31,324	Sunday, 12 August
Collingwood	17.17 (119)	Western Bulldogs	11.11 (77)	MCG	38,793	Sunday, 12 August
Essendon	11.13 (79)	Sydney	11.11 (77)	Colonial Stadium	45,057	Sunday, 12 August
West Coast	14.14 (98)	Fremantle	9.10 (64)	Subiaco Oval	41,285	Sunday, 12 August

=== Round 20 ===
Home team	Score	Away team	Score	Venue	Attendance	Date
Kangaroos	15.10 (100)	Adelaide	25.12 (162)	Colonial Stadium	25,340	Friday, 17 August
Richmond	20.18 (138)	West Coast	10.13 (73)	Colonial Stadium	25,856	Saturday, 18 August
Port Adelaide	14.15 (99)	Geelong	10.9 (69)	Football Park	25,536	Saturday, 18 August
Collingwood	13.9 (87)	Essendon	15.17 (107)	MCG	71,518	Saturday, 18 August
Hawthorn	12.7 (79)	Western Bulldogs	17.23 (125)	MCG	26,642	Sunday, 19 August
St Kilda	16.8 (104)	Carlton	22.16 (148)	Colonial Stadium	34,521	Sunday, 19 August
Sydney	14.14 (98)	Melbourne	19.17 (131)	SCG	28,367	Sunday, 19 August
Fremantle	12.15 (87)	Brisbane Lions	21.12 (138)	Subiaco Oval	15,136	Sunday, 19 August

=== Round 21 ===
Home team	Score	Away team	Score	Venue	Attendance	Date
Richmond	13.14 (92)	Kangaroos	13.10 (88)	MCG	37,776	Friday, 24 August
Carlton	20.10 (130)	Collingwood	9.8 (62)	MCG	70,051	Saturday, 25 August
West Coast	6.11 (47)	Essendon	21.10 (136)	Subiaco Oval	36,445	Saturday, 25 August
Western Bulldogs	10.13 (73)	Port Adelaide	22.18 (150)	Colonial Stadium	19,649	Saturday, 25 August
Adelaide	13.13 (91)	Hawthorn	8.5 (53)	Football Park	42,827	Sunday, 26 August
Geelong	9.13 (67)	Brisbane Lions	16.14 (110)	Shell Stadium	24,325	Sunday, 26 August
Melbourne	16.18 (114)	Fremantle	12.7 (79)	Colonial Stadium	12,566	Sunday, 26 August
Sydney	21.16 (142)	St Kilda	8.7 (55)	SCG	26,334	Sunday, 26 August

=== Round 22 ===
Home team	Score	Away team	Score	Venue	Attendance	Date
Essendon	12.11 (83)	Richmond	17.5 (107)	MCG	77,028	Friday, 31 August
Carlton	13.19 (97)	Geelong	3.9 (27)	Optus Oval	26,314	Saturday, 1 September
Fremantle	17.18 (120)	Adelaide	11.17 (83)	Subiaco Oval	19,535	Saturday, 1 September
Hawthorn	13.9 (87)	St Kilda	13.11 (89)	MCG	24,113	Saturday, 1 September
Brisbane Lions	13.15 (93)	Sydney	9.8 (62)	Gabba	33,606	Saturday, 1 September
Port Adelaide	24.19 (163)	West Coast	7.9 (51)	Football Park	22,976	Sunday, 2 September
Kangaroos	11.17 (83)	Collingwood	19.12 (126)	Manuka Oval	13,117	Sunday, 2 September
Western Bulldogs	19.9 (123)	Melbourne	21.7 (133)	Colonial Stadium	21,146	Sunday, 2 September

== Ladder ==
All teams played 22 games during the home-and-away season, for a total of 176. An additional nine games were played during the finals series.

2001 AFL ladder
Pos	Team	Pld	W	L	D	PF	PA	PP	Pts	
1	Essendon	22	17	5	0	2548	1895	134.5	68	Finals series
2	Brisbane Lions (P)	22	17	5	0	2538	1989	127.6	68	Finals series
3	Port Adelaide	22	16	6	0	2473	1918	128.9	64	Finals series
4	Richmond	22	15	7	0	2126	1973	107.8	60	Finals series
5	Carlton	22	14	8	0	2311	1797	128.6	56	Finals series
6	Hawthorn	22	13	9	0	2149	2041	105.3	52	Finals series
7	Sydney	22	12	10	0	2121	1833	115.7	48	Finals series
8	Adelaide	22	12	10	0	2085	2026	102.9	48	Finals series
9	Collingwood	22	11	11	0	2232	2088	106.9	44	
10	Western Bulldogs	22	10	12	0	2305	2458	93.8	40	
11	Melbourne	22	10	12	0	2136	2364	90.4	40	
12	Geelong	22	9	13	0	1926	2054	93.8	36	
13	Kangaroos	22	9	13	0	2161	2371	91.1	36	
14	West Coast	22	5	17	0	1708	2590	65.9	20	
15	St Kilda	22	4	18	0	1917	2642	72.6	16	
16	Fremantle	22	2	20	0	1794	2491	72.0	8	

Source: AFL ladder
Rules for classification: 1) points; 2) percentage; 3) number of points for.
(P) Premiers

=== Ladder progression ===
Numbers highlighted in green indicate that the team finished the round inside the top 8.
Numbers highlighted in blue indicates the team finished first on the ladder in that round.
Numbers highlighted in red indicates the team finished in last place on the ladder in that round.

Team ╲ Round	1	2	3	4	5	6	7	8	9	10	11	12	13	14	15	16	17	18	19	20	21	22
Essendon	4	8	8	12	16	20	24	28	32	32	36	40	44	48	52	56	56	56	60	64	68	68
Brisbane Lions	0	4	4	4	8	12	16	16	16	20	24	28	32	36	40	44	48	52	56	60	64	68
Port Adelaide	4	4	8	12	16	20	24	24	28	32	32	32	32	36	40	40	44	48	52	56	60	64
Richmond	4	4	8	12	16	20	20	20	20	24	28	32	36	36	36	40	44	48	48	52	56	60
Carlton	4	4	8	8	12	12	16	20	24	28	28	32	36	36	36	40	40	44	44	48	52	56
Hawthorn	4	8	12	16	20	24	28	32	32	32	32	36	36	40	40	44	48	48	52	52	52	52
Sydney	4	8	12	12	12	12	12	12	16	20	24	24	24	28	32	36	40	44	44	44	48	48
Adelaide	0	0	0	4	8	8	12	16	20	24	24	24	24	28	32	32	36	36	40	44	48	48
Collingwood	0	4	8	8	8	12	12	16	20	20	24	28	32	32	32	32	36	36	40	40	40	44
Western Bulldogs	0	4	4	8	8	8	12	16	20	20	24	28	28	28	32	36	36	36	36	40	40	40
Melbourne	0	4	8	8	12	16	16	16	16	20	20	20	20	20	24	24	24	28	28	32	36	40
Geelong	4	8	8	8	8	8	8	12	16	16	20	20	24	28	28	32	36	36	36	36	36	36
Kangaroos	0	0	0	4	4	4	8	12	12	16	20	20	24	28	32	32	32	32	36	36	36	36
West Coast	0	0	4	8	8	8	8	8	8	8	8	8	12	12	12	12	12	16	20	20	20	20
St Kilda	4	4	4	4	4	8	8	8	8	8	8	12	12	12	12	12	12	12	12	12	12	16
Fremantle	0	0	0	0	0	0	0	0	0	0	0	0	0	0	0	0	0	4	4	4	4	8

== Finals series ==
Qualifying and elimination finals
7 Sep, MCG
1	Essendon	17.11 (113)
4	Richmond	5.13 (43)
8 Sep, MCG
5	Carlton	17.16 (118)
8	Adelaide	6.14 (50)
9 Sep, Colonial Stadium
6	Hawthorn	19.11 (125)
7	Sydney	11.8 (74)
8 Sep, The Gabba
2	Brisbane Lions	12.16 (88)
3	Port Adelaide	8.8 (56)

Semi-finals
15 Sep, MCG
Richmond	10.7 (67)
Carlton	7.14 (56)
15 Sep, Football Park
Port Adelaide	10.9 (69)
Hawthorn	10.12 (72)

Preliminary finals
22 Sep, MCG
Essendon	11.10 (76)
Hawthorn	9.13 (67)
22 Sep, The Gabba
Brisbane Lions	20.16 (136)
Richmond	10.8 (68)

Grand final
29 Sep, MCG
Essendon	12.10 (82)
Brisbane Lions	15.18 (108)

=== Week one ===
	Qualifying Finals
Friday 7 September (7:45 pm)	Essendon 17.11 (113)	def.	Richmond 5.13 (43)	MCG (crowd: 78,253)
Saturday 8 September (7:40 pm)	Brisbane Lions 12.16 (88)	def.	Port Adelaide 8.8 (56)	The Gabba (crowd: 32,380)

	Elimination Finals
Saturday 8 September (2:30 pm)	Carlton 17.16 (118)	def.	Adelaide 6.14 (50)	MCG (crowd: 53,982)
Sunday 9 September (2:30 pm)	Hawthorn 19.15 (129)	def.	Sydney 11.8 (74)	Colonial Stadium (crowd: 32,910)

=== Week two ===
	Semi-finals
Saturday 15 September (2:30 pm)	Richmond 10.7 (67)	def.	Carlton 7.14 (56)	MCG (crowd: 83,323)
Saturday 15 September (7:15 pm)	Port Adelaide 10.9 (69)	def. by	Hawthorn 10.12 (72)	Football Park (crowd: 30,613)

=== Week three ===
	Preliminary Finals
Saturday 22 September (2:30 pm)	Essendon 11.10 (76)	def.	Hawthorn 9.13 (67)	MCG (crowd: 86,468)
Saturday 22 September (7:45 pm)	Brisbane Lions 20.16 (136)	def.	Richmond 10.8 (68)	The Gabba (crowd: 37,032)

=== Week four ===
Grand Final
Saturday 29 September (2:30 pm)	Essendon	def. by	Brisbane Lions	MCG (crowd: 91,482)
3.2 (20); 8.6 (54); 9.8 (62); 12.10 (82)	Q1; Q2; Q3; Final	3.7 (25); 5.10 (40); 11.12 (78); 15.18 (108)	Umpires: McLaren, Ellis, James; Norm Smith Medal: Shaun Hart (Brisbane Lions); Television broadcast: Seven Network; National anthem: Julie Anthony
Lloyd 5, Lucas 4, Caracella, Johnson, Moorcroft	Goals	Power 3, Akermanis 2, Brown 2, Lappin 2, Lynch 2, Ashcroft, Notting, Pike, Voss
Lloyd, Lucas, J. Johnson	Best	Hart, Johnson, Voss, Lappin, Power

== Match attendance ==
Team	Hosted	Average	Highest	Lowest	Total	Last year	Up/Down
Essendon	11	51,790	83,905	29,528	569,685	48,353	+ 3437
Collingwood	11	49,977	78,638	26,067	549,751	45,012	+ 4965
Richmond	11	46,129	77,576	25,856	507,416	44,012	+ 2117
Adelaide	11	39,627	46,852	31,534	435,897	38,470	+ 1157
Melbourne	11	34,060	62,761	12,566	374,665	37,599	– 3499
West Coast Eagles	11	32,669	41,285	25,588	359,360	33,136	– 467
Hawthorn	11	31,449	52,472	16,595	346,490	34,417	– 2918
Carlton	11	31,263	70,051	15,622	343,889	34,414	– 3151
Port Adelaide	11	30,789	49,846	22,423	338,683	26,377	+ 4412
St Kilda	11	29,850	40,783	14,018	328,355	24,422	+ 5428
Western Bulldogs	11	29,660	48,728	15,111	326,263	30,572	– 912
Sydney	11	27,982	40,131	20,611	307,800	25,563	+ 2419
Brisbane Lions	11	27,638	36,149	20,059	304,014	27,406	+ 232
Geelong	11	27,093	50,160	14,298	298,024	27,729	– 636
Kangaroos	11	26,998	56,028	10,030	296,983	22,092	+ 4906
Fremantle	11	21,258	38,804	15,136	233,842	22,357	– 1099
Totals	176	33,643	83,905	10,030	5,921,117	32,618	+ 1025

Venue	Hosted	Average	Highest	Lowest	Total	Last year	Up/Down
MCG	44	47,425	83,905	17,566	2086,712	46,141	+ 1284
Football Park	22	35,208	49,846	22,423	774,580	32,424	+ 2784
Colonial Stadium	43	31,939	50,701	12,566	1373,371	30,524	+ 1415
Gabba	12	27,313	36,149	20,059	327,754	27,406	– 93
SCG	13	27,159	40,131	20,611	353,069	22,390	+ 4769
Subiaco Oval	22	26,964	41,285	15,136	593,202	30,326	– 3362
Optus Oval	9	23,417	30,067	15,622	210,750	24,656	– 1239
Shell Stadium	7	21,445	27,421	14,298	150,114	22,108	– 663
York Park	1	17,460	17,460	17,460	17,460	N/A	N/A
Manuka Oval	3	11,368	13,117	10,030	34,105	N/A	N/A
Totals	176	33,643	83,905	10,030	5,921,117	32,618	+ 1025

== Awards ==
- The Brownlow Medal was awarded to Jason Akermanis of the Brisbane Lions.
- The AFL Players Association MVP Award went to Andrew McLeod of Adelaide.
  - This was the last year for the award under this name; starting with the 2002 season, it would be renamed the "Leigh Matthews Trophy".
- The Coleman Medal was awarded to Matthew Lloyd of Essendon.
- The Norm Smith Medal was awarded to Shaun Hart of the Brisbane Lions.
- The AFL Rising Star award was awarded to Justin Koschitzke of St Kilda.

== Notable events ==
- In their Round 16 match, Essendon trailed by 69 points 12 minutes into the second quarter against the Kangaroos, but recovered to record a high-scoring 12-point win. This presently stands as the largest ever comeback in a VFL/AFL game.
- Melbourne and Collingwood began its annual tradition of playing each other at the M.C.G. in a Melbourne home game on Queen's Birthday Holiday, as the only AFL match of the day. The teams had met on the King's or Queen's Birthday Holiday sporadically in the past (1950, 1958, 1961, 1964, 1975, 1977, 1983, 1993, 1996 and 1999) as one of several games played on the day, with the 1958 game's attendance of 99,256 still enduring as the highest crowd for a non-final, but this was the first season that the fixture became annual, and the second time (after 1996) that the game was the only one played on the day.
- Fremantle lost their first 17 matches of the season in succession; having lost in the final round of the 2000 season, this took the Dockers' losing streak to 18, and was the worst start to a season by any club since Fitzroy lost all eighteen games in 1964.
- During the season, it came to the attention of the AFL that in 2000 and 2001, the Brisbane Lions had been using a controversial but then-legal practice of rehydrating its players by use of intravenous saline drip during half-time and between matches. The half-time drips were administered through stents which were inserted into the players' elbows prior to the game and covered with tape during the game. The AFL was concerned about negative perceptions of the practice, and the Lions agreed in early September to immediately cease intravenous rehydration. The league banned the practice in the 2002 pre-season, and the World Anti Doping Agency later banned the practice in 2007.
