= William Sinclair =

William Sinclair may refer to:

== Nobility ==
- William Sinclair, 1st Earl of Caithness (1410–1484), Scottish nobleman
- William Sinclair, 2nd Earl of Caithness (1459–1513), Scottish nobleman
- William Sinclair, 10th Earl of Caithness (1727–1779), Scottish nobleman

== Politicians ==
- William Pirrie Sinclair (1837–1900), MP for Antrim and Falkirk Burghs
- W. E. N. Sinclair (1873–1947), Canadian barrister, solicitor and politician
- William Henry Sinclair (1864–1902), Canadian politician in the Legislative Assembly of the Northwest Territories

== Religious figures ==
- William Sinclair (bishop) (died 1337), bishop of Dunkeld
- William Sinclair (priest) (1804–1878), Scottish author and rector of Pulborough, Sussex
- William Sinclair (archdeacon of London) (1850–1917), Anglican priest and author
- William Sinclair (United Irishmen) (died 1830), Irish revolutionary

== Others ==
- William Sinclair (cricketer) (1846–1869), Australian cricketer
- William Sinclair (general) (1835–1905), US Army brigadier general
- William Sinclair (footballer) (born 1934), Scottish footballer
- William Sinclair (fur trader) (1790s–1868), chief factor of the Hudson's Bay Company
- William H. Sinclair (1838–1897) Businessman; Union Officer
- William John Sinclair (1877–1935), American geologist and paleontologist
- William Angus Sinclair (1905–1954), Scottish philosopher
- Will Sinclair, a character in Angel in My Pocket
- William C. Sinclair, Co-CEO J.P. Morgan U.S. Private Bank

== See also ==
- William Saint-Clair (disambiguation), "Saint-Clair" is a variant of "Sinclair"
- Sinclair (disambiguation)
- William (disambiguation)
