= Alison Sinclair (virologist) =

British virologist

Alison Jane Sinclair SFHEA is professor of molecular virology at the University of Sussex where she runs the Sinclair Lab. Her research interests include the Epstein Barr virus. She is a fellow of the Royal Society of Biology and a senior fellow of the Higher Education Academy.
