= EnterpriseAlumni =

US-based software corporation

EnterpriseAlumni Inc.

- Type: Privately held company
- Industry: Computer software
- Founded: California (2016)
- Founder: James Sinclair, Emma Sinclair
- Headquarters: Los Angeles, California, US
- Number of employees: 42
- Website: www.enterprisealumni.com

EnterpriseAlumni is a US-based multinational software corporation that makes enterprise software to manage corporate Alumni & Retirees of large organizations. The company was co-founded in 2016 by Emma Sinclair and James Sinclair. James Sinclair exited the company and a majority of his holding in August 2022 via a secondary market transaction.

== History ==
SAP aimed to launch a formal Alumni Network in 2016 in an effort to drive recruitment of Gen Z employees, in late 2015 SAP asked custom enterprise software developer EnterpriseJungle to develop the platform atop SAP's custom PaaS "SAP Cloud Platform" and it was launched by SAP CEO Bill McDermott in a press release.

In 2017 EnterpriseJungle rebranded as EnterpriseAlumni and came to market with existing SAP customers Lufthansa and Bechtel

== Competitors ==
EnterpriseAlumni competitors include Aluminati, PeoplePath, Avature, Salesforce, alumniEX, and ServiceNow's Alumni Service Center.
