= Edward Sinclair =

Edward Sinclair may refer to:

- Edward Sinclair (cricketer) (1889–1966), English cricketer and Royal Navy officer
- Edward Sinclair (actor) (1914–1977), English actor
- Edward Sinclair (swimmer) (born 1980), British swimmer
