= Donald Sinclair (American politician) =

American farmer and politician

Donald Sinclair (January 9, 1899 – October 5, 1978) was an American farmer and politician.

Sinclair was born on a farm in Stephen, Marshall County, Minnesota and graduated from Stephen High School. He served in the United States Navy during World War I and then received his bachelor's degree from the University of Minnesota in 1924. Sinclair lived in Stephen, Minnesota with his wife and family and was a farmer. Sinclair served in the Minnesota Senate from 1947 until 1972 and was a Democrat. Ne died from cancer in a hospital in Warren, Minnesota.
