= Jess Sinclair =

Australian rules footballer, born 1978

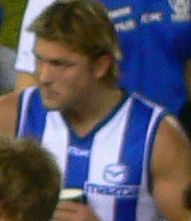

Personal information
- Full name: Jess Sinclair
- Born: 26 August 1978 (age 48)
- Original team: East Ringwood / Eastern U18
- Height: 180 cm (5 ft 11 in)
- Weight: 82 kg (181 lb)

Playing career^{1}
Years	Club	Games (Goals)
1997 – 2000	Fremantle	50 (26)
2001 – 2008	Kangaroos	142 (45)
Total		192 (71)
- ^{1} Playing statistics correct to the end of 2008.

Career highlights
- AFL Rising Star nominee: 1998

Jess Sinclair (born 26 August 1978) is an Australian rules footballer who formerly played in the Australian Football League, Sinclair was a dashing half back flanker who had played for first the Fremantle Dockers, and later the Kangaroos.

== Fremantle career ==
Jess represented Eastern Ranges for the TAC Cup before being drafted to Fremantle in the 1996 AFL draft with selection 31. He was seen as a development player and had a breakout year in 1998, playing in 20 of the 22 games, winning an AFL Rising Star nomination and finishing 10th in the club best and fairest award. However he did not continue to develop in the coming years and after playing only 21 more games for a total of 50 at Fremantle, he was traded to the Kangaroos at the end of the 2000 season as part of the Peter Bell trade.

== North Melbourne career ==
Sinclair transformed from a wingman to become a rebounding defender in 2002. In 2003 he had an above average year before ending badly in Round 20 by earning a five match suspension that delayed his start to 2004. His form decreased in 2004, playing only 17 games for 245 possessions. Since 2005 Sinclair has become more consistent, playing over 20 games each season, including every game in 2007 and finishing in the top 10 in the Syd Barker Medal in 2006. He announced his retirement from AFL football on 10 September 2008, at the age of 30.

After retiring from the AFL, Sinclair played for the Heidelberg Football Club in the Northern Football League from 2009 until 2013, and played in the club's 2009 premiership team. He retired from playing at the end of 2013, and will coach St Mary's/Salesian in the Victorian Amateur Football Association from 2014.
