= Snoddy (surname) =

Snoddy is a Scottish surname. Notable people with this name include:

- Alan Snoddy, Northern Irish football referee
- Raymond Snoddy, British journalist and media commentator
- Stephen Snoddy, British curator of contemporary art
- Aengus Ó Snodaigh, Irish politician bearing the Irish translation of the name Angus Snoddy.
- William Snoddy (born 1957), American sprint athlete
