= Ian Sinclair (cricketer) =

New Zealand cricketer (1933–2019)

- Ian Sinclair in March 1956

Personal information
- Full name: Ian McKay Sinclair
- Born: 1 June 1933; Rangiora, New Zealand
- Died: 25 August 2019 (aged 86); Tauranga, New Zealand
- Batting: Left-handed
- Bowling: Right-arm off-spin
- Relatives: Azalea Sinclair (wife)

International information
- National side: New Zealand (1956)
- Test debut (cap 79): 18 February 1956 v West Indies
- Last Test: 3 March 1956 v West Indies

Domestic team information
- Years: Team
- 1953-1957: Canterbury

Career statistics
Competition	Test	First-class
Matches	2	15
Runs scored	25	264
Batting average	8.33	14.66
100s/50s	0/0	0/0
Top score	18*	40
Balls bowled	233	2853
Wickets	1	41
Bowling average	120.00	27.34
5 wickets in innings	0	2
10 wickets in match	0	0
Best bowling	1/79	5/57
Catches/stumpings	1/-	16/-
- Source: Cricinfo, 28 September 2016

Ian McKay Sinclair (1 June 1933 – 25 August 2019) was a New Zealand cricketer who played in two Tests in 1956.

== Life and career ==
Sinclair was born in Rangiora, Canterbury, and educated at Rangiora High School. An off-spin bowler and useful tail-end batsman, Sinclair made his first-class cricket debut for Canterbury in the 1953–54 season when Matt Poore was in South Africa with the New Zealand team. His performances were moderate (108 runs at 15.42 and 10 wickets at 41.70 in five matches) and he did not appear in 1954–55.

When Poore was away again in 1955–56, this time touring India and Pakistan, and Tom Burtt retired, Sinclair became Canterbury's leading spin bowler. He took 5 for 57 and 2 for 26 in the first match of the Plunket Shield season against Otago, 1 for 50 and 4 for 17 as well as his highest score of 40 in the next match against Auckland, 4 for 36 and 0 for 74 against Wellington, and 5 for 65 and 1 for 73 against Central Districts. All four matches were victories for Canterbury, which consequently won the competition. He took 4 for 73 for Canterbury against the touring West Indians, and was selected in the team for the Second and Third Tests. However, he took only one wicket (of Everton Weekes), New Zealand lost both matches, and he never played another Test. He was twelfth man in the Fourth Test, when New Zealand recorded their first Test victory.

He played three matches for Canterbury in 1956-57 but took only four wickets.

== Personal life ==
Sinclair and his wife Azalea, a former New Zealand netball representative, were married for 63 years. He died in Tauranga in August 2019, aged 86.
