= COVID-19 pandemic in California =

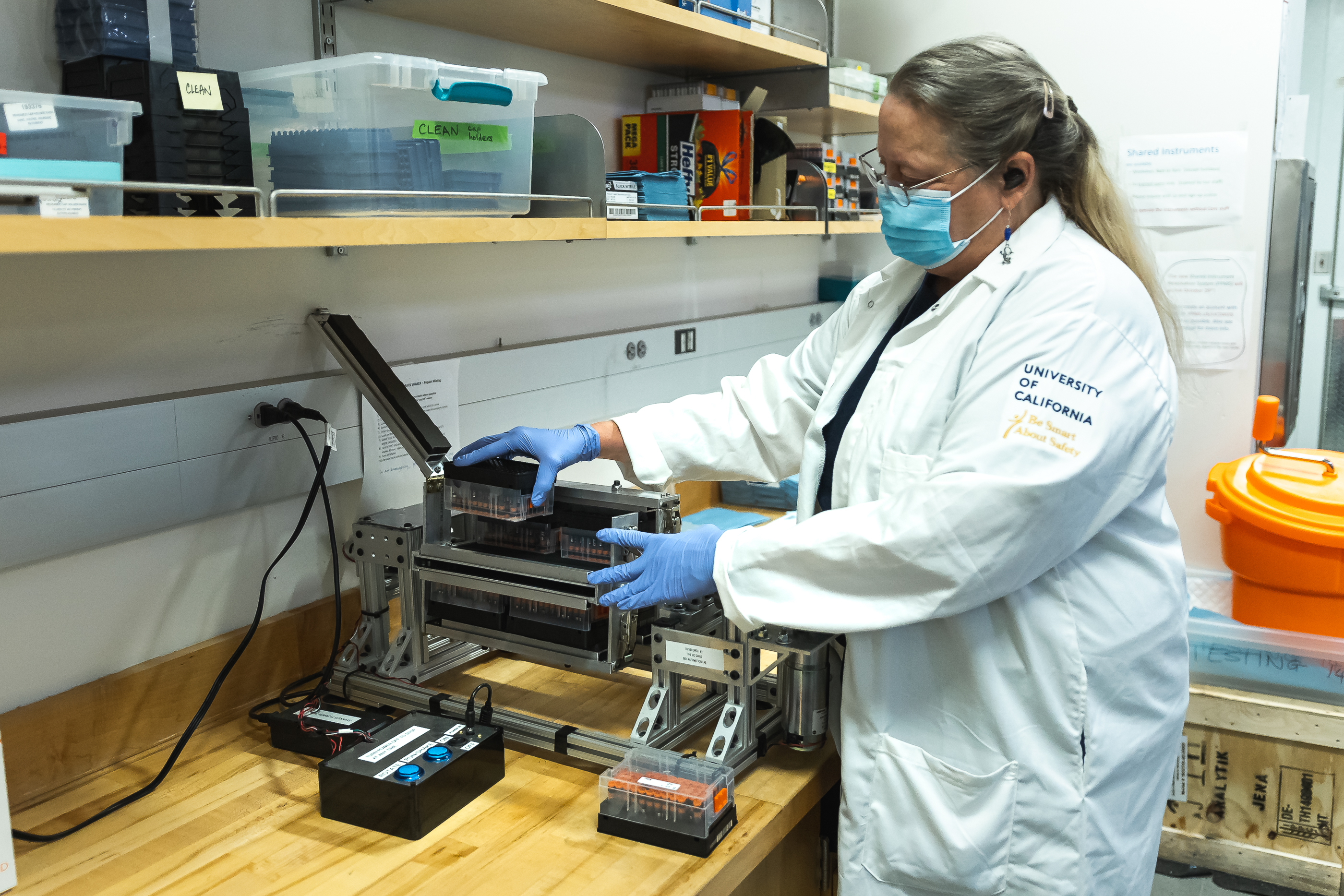
- A UC Davis engineer using COVID-19 testing equipment
- Disease: COVID-19
- Pathogen: SARS-CoV-2
- Location: California, U.S
- First outbreak: Wuhan, Hubei, China
- Index case: Orange County
- Arrival date: January 25, 2020
- Confirmed cases: 9,894,792 (JHU); 9,199,942 (CDPH)
- Suspected cases: At least 221,000 in April 2020
- Hospitalized cases: 11,045 (confirmed); 820 (suspected)
- Critical cases: 2,996 (confirmed); 95 (suspected)
- Deaths: 91,922 (JHU); 91,240 (CDPH); 63,191 (Google News)

Government website
- cdph.ca.gov/covid19

The COVID-19 pandemic in California began earlier than in some other parts of the United States. Ten of the first 20 confirmed COVID-19 infections in the United States were detected in California, and the first infection was confirmed on January 26, 2020. All of the early confirmed cases were persons who had recently travelled to China, as testing was restricted to this group, but there were some other people infected by that point. A state of emergency was declared in the state on March 4, 2020. A mandatory statewide stay-at-home order was issued on March 19, 2020; it was ended on January 25, 2021. On April 6, 2021, the state announced plans to fully reopen the economy by June 15, 2021.

As of June 16, 2022, the California Department of Public Health (CDPH) has reported 9,199,942 confirmed cumulative cases and 91,240 deaths in the state. This was the highest number of confirmed cases in the United States, but because the state has the highest population of any US state, it also had one of the lowest rankings (41st highest out of 50 states) for confirmed cases per capita. It has the highest count of deaths related to the virus, but a relatively low (35th highest) count of deaths per capita. As of June 15, 2021, California had administered 40,669,793 COVID-19 vaccine doses, the largest number of doses nationwide, and was one of the highest ranked (11th out of 50 states) in terms of per-capita dose administration.

A bipartisan effort of politicians and owners of restaurants, bars, gyms, spas, and other small businesses harmed by lockdown restrictions attempted to recall Governor Gavin Newsom in 2021; he won the election with 66% support.

California is the origin of the Epsilon variant of SARS-CoV-2, which, in March 2021, accounted for 35% of all confirmed cases of COVID-19 in the state at that time.

== Timeline ==
=== First detection ===
Although later events suggested that COVID-19 had been present within California in December 2019, the virus was not detected for the first time until late January 2020: On January 26, 2020, the Centers for Disease Control and Prevention (CDC) confirmed the first case in California. The person, who had returned from travel to Wuhan, China, was released from the hospital in Orange County on February 1 in good condition to in-home isolation. On January 31, the CDC confirmed the state's second case, a man in Santa Clara County, who had recently traveled to Wuhan. The man recovered at home and was released from in-home isolation on February 20.

On January 29, 2020, as disease containment protocols were still being developed, the U.S. Department of State evacuated 195 of its employees, their families, and other U.S. citizens from Hubei Province aboard a chartered flight to March Air Reserve Base in Riverside County. There were concerns at the time that allowing Americans to return from overseas might spread COVID-19 within California and the rest of the US.

On February 2, the CDC confirmed the state's third case in a woman in Santa Clara County, California, who had recently traveled to Wuhan. On the same day, the CDC reported the country's tenth and eleventh cases in San Benito County, including the second known instance of human-to-human transmission.

On February 5, the U.S. evacuated 345 citizens from Hubei Province and took them to two air bases in California, Travis Air Force Base in Solano County and Marine Corps Air Station Miramar, San Diego, to be quarantined for 14 days.

=== First death ===
On February 6, 2020, a woman from San Jose, California became the first COVID-19 death in the United States, though this was not discovered until April 2020. The case indicated community transmission had been happening undetected in the state and the United States, most likely since December 2019. On March 4, it was separately reported that the first coronavirus fatality in the state had instead occurred in Placer County.

On February 15, the government evacuated 338 U.S. nationals stranded aboard the cruise ship Diamond Princess, which had been held in quarantine in Yokohama, Japan. Fourteen of those repatriated people were infected with the virus. Five more nationals with COVID-19 were evacuated from the ship the following week and were quarantined at Travis Air Force Base; several more cases among the evacuees were later confirmed.

On February 26, 2020, a confirmed case of unknown origin was announced about a resident of Solano County. The UC Davis Medical Center in Sacramento had asked the CDC to test for SARS-CoV-2, even though the person did not meet the CDC's criteria for testing at the time, which required a likely exposure to an infected person through either travel or close contact with someone known to have COVID-19. The CDC eventually agreed to do the test, which proved the person had COVID-19. After this first confirmed case of community transmission in the United States, the CDC revised its criteria for testing patients for SARS-CoV-2 and issued new guidelines for healthcare workers.

=== State of emergency ===
On March 2, 2020, amidst concerns over the spread of coronavirus in the state, Governor Gavin Newsom declared a state of emergency in California. Newsom issued a mandatory statewide stay-at-home order on March 19, 2020; it would be ended 10 months later, on January 25, 2021. This order caused the closure of schools, restaurants, meeting places, and many workplaces.

A McDonald's restaurant in San Jose displaying a notice informing customers that masks are required, taken September 29, 2020

On March 24, a teenager who tested positive and died in Lancaster, part of Los Angeles County, appeared to have become the first individual in the United States under the age of 18 to die of COVID-19. However, while he had COVID-19 at the time of his death, it is unclear whether COVID-19 caused his death.

On June 18, 2020, Newsom ordered a statewide mask mandate due to the rising number of cases and deaths, requiring citizens to wear masks or other coverings in most public spaces with a few exceptions. Many local governments had previously dropped mandatory mask-wearing measures. On July 9, he reported a new record number of COVID-19-related deaths in the state. By July 22, California surpassed 409,000 COVID-19 cases, surpassing New York for the most in the nation.

On August 19, 2020, Dr. Sonia Y. Angell resigned as the CDPH Director and State Public Health Officer. Governor Gavin Newsom indicated Angell's resignation was related to data issues with the California Reportable Disease Information Exchange (CalREDIE) system that resulted in nearly 300,000 backlogged COVID-19 test results. On August 10, 2020, Sandra Shewry was appointed as acting director and Dr. Erica Pan, California state epidemiologist, was named acting state public health officer.

By September 3, 2020, Hispanic and Latino Americans comprised up to 60% of COVID-19 cases in the state, ostensibly due to the large population of the demographic and many of them being a part of the essential workforce. Filipino Americans were the second-most affected, in part due to a high percentage of workers in healthcare on the frontlines, and as well as having a very high percentage of essential workers much like Latino Americans in California.

On October 26, 2020, San Francisco and Oakland phased out Google's sister company Verily's COVID-19 testing system following concerns about patients’ data privacy and complaints about its funding, which despite intention to boost testing in low-income Black and Latino neighborhoods was benefiting higher-income residents in other communities.

On December 30, 2020, a confirmed case of a new, more contagious SARS-CoV-2 variant from the United Kingdom was reported in Southern California. On January 6, 2021, the CDC announced that it had found at least 26 confirmed cases of the more contagious SARS-CoV-2 variant in California. As of March 2, 2021, 189 sequences in the B.1.1.7 lineage have been detected in California since the lineage was first identified.

As of March 2, 2021, 1,608 sequences in the B.1.427 lineage and 3,903 sequences in the B.1.429 lineage had been detected in California.

The statewide mask mandate ended on June 15, 2021, with the state recommending outdoor events with 10,000 or more attendees and indoor events of 5,000 or more attendees recommended by the state to require masks for individuals without proof of vaccination or a negative test. The mandate was reinstated for one month on December 15, 2021 in response to a surge in cases due to the Omicron variant. On January 5, 2022, the mandate was extended for another month, ending on February 15. The state's mask mandate for K-12 schools was lifted on March 12, 2022.

On February 28, 2023, the state of emergency officially ended.

== Equipment shortage ==
California formerly had a strategic stockpile of medical supplies for responding to epidemics. In 2006, then-Governor Arnold Schwarzenegger ordered creation of an epidemic-ready medical equipment stockpile, including three 200-bed mobile hospitals with 50 million N95 respirators, 2,400 ventilators, and 21,000 additional patient beds. Governor Jerry Brown cut the budget for warehousing and keeping up the reserve in 2011, responding to the Great Recession economic downturn.

=== Personal protective equipment for healthcare workers ===
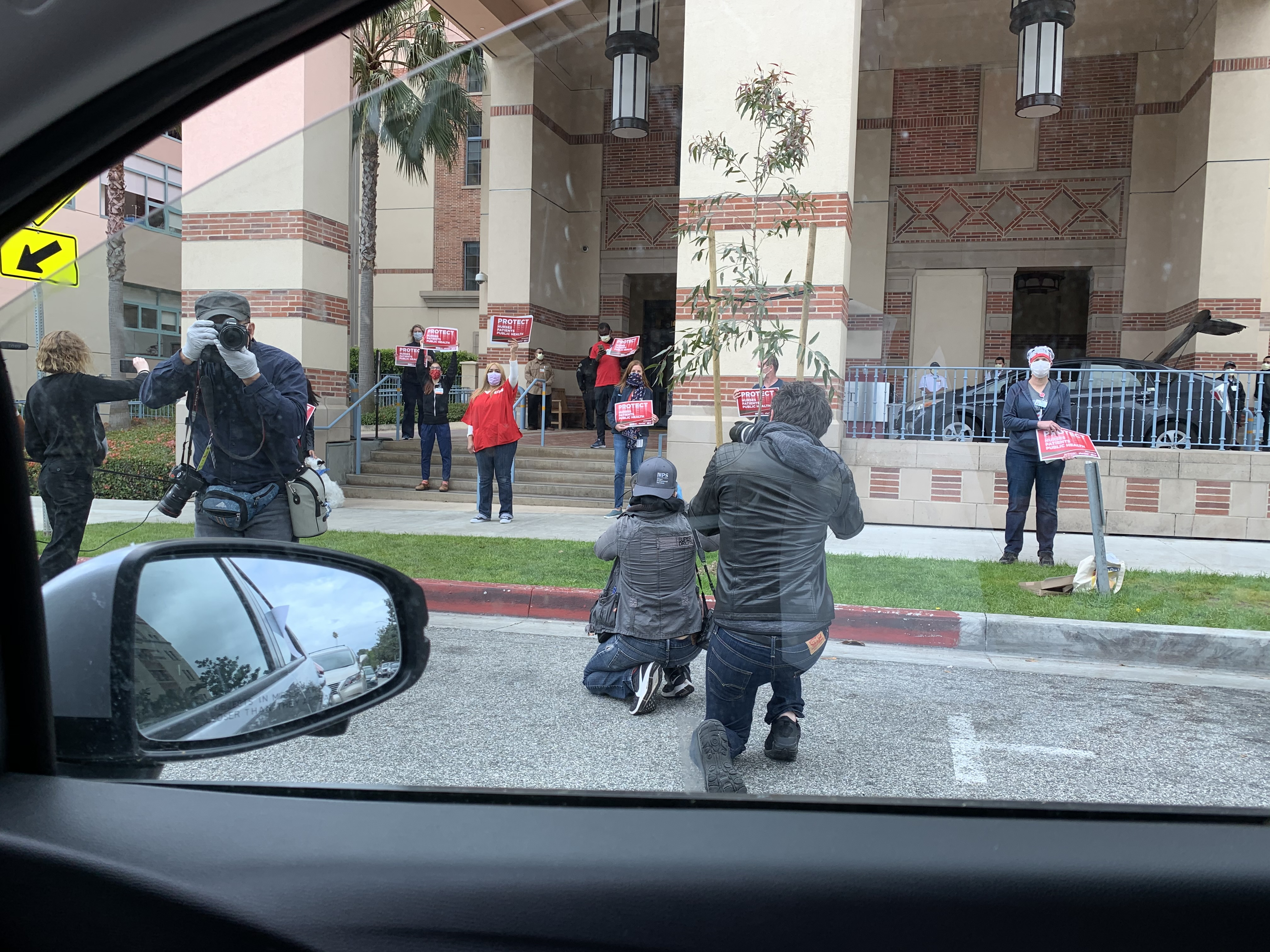
Nurses protesting a lack of N-95 masks at the UCLA Medical Center on April 13, 2020

As early as January 2020, a survey by the California Department of Public Health found that many Californian health care providers were having trouble obtaining adequate personal protective equipment (PPE), such as masks, gowns, and eye protection. By mid-March, 2020, when Newsom issued the first statewide shelter-in-place order, 220 of 292 California hospitals surveyed already reported that they were having to limit use of masks, often severely. Even with limitations in place, Newsom estimated that California healthcare facilities were still using about 46 million masks each month during the pandemic.

As safety equipment shortages continued throughout the first months of the pandemic, many doctors, nurses and emergency medical service workers expressed fears and frustrations at being asked to reuse safety gear or wear homemade and less effective masks and at the overall lack of proper PPE, which does not provide adequate protection from COVID-19 exposure. As of July 29, 2020, local agencies reported 127 deaths from a total of 23,513 confirmed positive cases among healthcare workers in California.

Newsom's administration made several attempts to procure masks and other protective equipment for healthcare workers, including:

- multiple attempts at large-scale mask purchases, including failed deals with Blue Flame Medical, which was investigated by the US Department of Justice, and Bear Mountain Development Co., as well as a successful, if initially delayed, purchase from BYD; and
- a marketplace portal where individuals and businesses could offer PPE for donation or sale, attracting many small donations as well as fraudulent business posts that overwhelmed the site managers.

As of July 22, 2020, California's stockpile reached approximately 86 million N-95 masks and 111 million surgical and procedural masks.

=== Hospitals and ventilators ===
The State of California loaned 500 ventilators to high need states in the east and midwest during the pandemic.

At the start of 2020, California had 416 hospitals, yielding a statewide capacity of about 78,000 staffed beds. In mid-March, 2020, when the state was preparing for a surge of COVID-19 cases, Newsom submitted an unfulfilled request for 10,000 ventilators from the federal government. The state government continued to acquire ventilators, but was able to flatten the curve enough that on April 6, 2020, California donated 500 ventilators to the Strategic National Stockpile for use in other states. As of July 13, 2020, hospitals statewide report that 36% of ICU beds were available still, as were 72% of ventilators. However, the hardest-hit counties were quickly reaching capacity and reportedly borrowing ventilators from neighboring hospitals to meet demand.

=== Community response ===
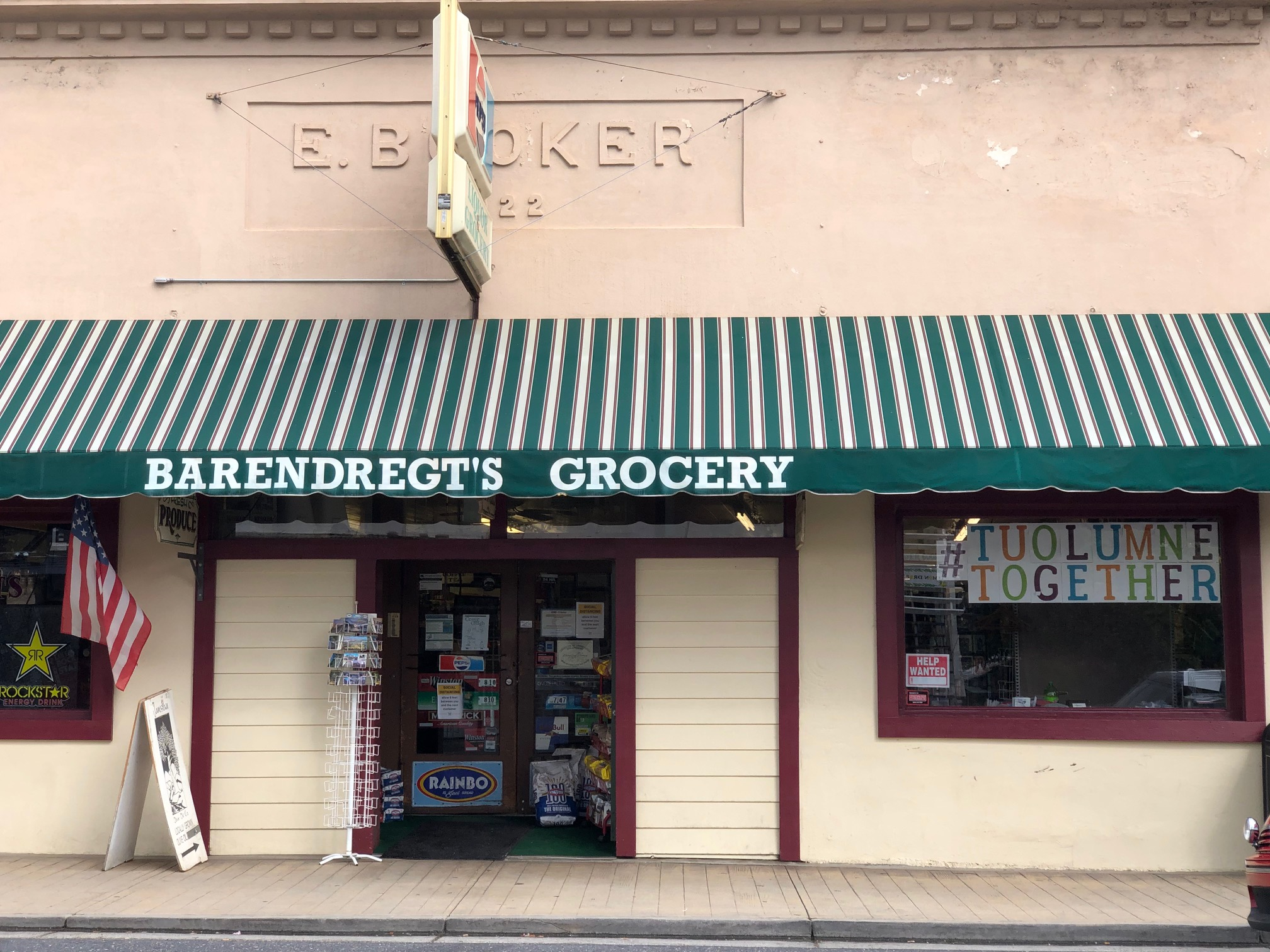
A sign of community support for Tuolumne County in a shop window in Jamestown, California on May 30, 2020

In March 2020, there were calls for crowdsourcing on social media, to donate masks, goggles, or other equipment to healthcare professionals, including from major medical centers. Local public health offices started coordinating donation efforts.

Maker Nexus, a non-profit maker space in Sunnyvale, began making face shields to donate to local hospitals and other health care facilities, using its 3D printers and laser cutters. They also worked with hundreds of individuals in the Bay Area with 3D printers at home, who then brought their produces to Maker Nexus for final assembly and delivery. Together with other groups and individuals, the maker space also made cloth face masks to substitute for surgical masks in non-critical applications.

== Government response ==
In January 2026, California became the first and only U.S. state to join the World Health Organization's Global Outbreak Alert & Response Network (GOARN). Governor Gavin Newsom announced the partnership to maintain rapid detection and international coordination for emerging public health threats following the federal government's withdrawal from the WHO.

Timeline for Government Response (State-Issued)
Date	Action Taken	Weekly cases leading up to stricter/lifted restrictions
March 4, 2020	State of emergency declared.	
March 12, 2020	Mass gatherings (over 250 people) and social gatherings (over 10 people) banned.	
March 19, 2020	State-wide stay-at-home order issued.	781
March 24, 2020	Intakes in prisons and juvenile correction centers postponed.	
April 1, 2020	Closure of all public and private schools (including institutions of higher education) ordered for the remainder of the 2019–2020 academic year.	6,865
April 9, 2020	State offered to pay hotel room costs for hospital and other essential workers afraid of returning home and infecting family members.	
April 24, 2020	Program to deliver free meals to elderly residents announced.	
April 29, 2020	Expansion of the state's Farm to Family program (which helps connect farmers to food banks) announced.	
May 6, 2020	Worker's compensation extended for all workers who contracted COVID-19 during the state's stay-at-home order.	
May 6, 2020	Property tax penalties waived for residents and small businesses that have been negatively affected by the pandemic.	
May 7, 2020	State entered Stage 2 of its 4-stage reopening roadmap.	12,224
May 8, 2020	Executive order signed that would send every registered voter a mail-in ballot for the general election.	
May 18, 2020	Businesses that are part of Stage 3 allowed to reopen.	12,615
May 26, 2020	Hair service businesses allowed to reopen (with restrictions).	16,107
June 18, 2020	Universal masking guidance issued by Department of Public Health.	23,701
June 28, 2020	Bars ordered to close in several counties.	37,842
July 1, 2020	Most indoor businesses, including restaurants, wineries, and movie theaters ordered to close in several counties.	43,420
July 13, 2020	Closure of gyms, indoor dining, bars, movie theaters, and museums re-imposed.	57,393
August 28, 2020	Unveiled a new set of guidelines for lifting restrictions, titled a "Blueprint for a Safer Economy" (BSE).	
August 31, 2020	BSE county-level restrictions take effect. See below for initial classifications. More than 80% of population is under "Widespread" restrictions.	
September 29, 2020	Majority of population now under "Substantial" or lower BSE restrictions. (Note: Population as of July 2019.) (Note: Percentages may not add up to 100% due to rounding.)	
November 10, 2020	Majority of population back up to "Widespread" BSE restrictions.	
November 21, 2020	Nighttime curfew implemented for counties under "Widespread" BSE restrictions.	82,834
December 3, 2020	Regional stay-at-home orders announced.	
December 7, 2020	Southern California and San Joaquin Valley regions under Regional stay-at-home order .	
January 6, 2021	Golden State stimulus program announced.	
January 25, 2021	Nighttime curfew and regional stay-at-home orders lifted.	116,992
March 13, 2021	Majority of population back under "Substantial" or lower BSE restrictions.	
April 6, 2021	Majority of population under "Moderate" or lower BSE restrictions.	
April 6, 2021	Plan for reopening the economy and scrapping the BSE system on June 15 announced.	18,822
April 29, 2021	$6.2 billion tax cut for small businesses signed into law.	
May 10, 2021	California Comeback Plan announced.	
May 27, 2021	Vax for the Win incentive program announced.	
June 8, 2021	Majority of population under "Minimal" BSE restrictions.	
June 15, 2021	Retired the Blueprint for a Safer Economy. Masks are still required in schools, on public transportation, such as buses, airplanes, the COASTER and the Pacific Surfliner. hospitals, prisons, and long-term care facilities require masks.	

== Statistics and data ==
External 3D model
- Los Angeles Times; Tracking California coronavirus confirmed cases continuously updated
- Coronavirus Maps & Tables

External 3D models
- LA County Communities COVID-19 Cases; Center for Geospatial Science and Technology; California State University, Northridge; Steven Graves continuously updated
- Map: LA COVID-19 by Community via ArcGIS
- Walkthrough: COVID-19 in LA County via ArcGIS

COVID-19 pandemic medical cases in California by county
County (Note: County where individuals with a positive case reside. Location of diagnosis and treatment may vary.)	Cases (Note: Reported confirmed cases. Actual case numbers are probably higher.) (Note: Includes 4,262 cases from unknown counties.)	Deaths	Population (Note: Population estimate from "COVID-19 Time-Series Metrics by County and State - Datasets - California Health and Human Services Open Data Portal". California Health and Human Services. From "covid19cases_test.csv". California Health and Human Services.)	Cases / 100k
58 / 58	11,251,994	101,854	40,129,160	28,039.4
Alameda	386,293	2,156	1,685,886	22,913.4
Alpine	139	0	1,117	12,444.0
Amador	10,693	98	38,531	27,751.7
Butte	42,069	499	217,769	19,318.2
Calaveras	9,091	143	44,289	20,526.5
Colusa	4,033	24	22,593	17,850.7
Contra Costa	277,369	1,596	1,160,099	23,909.1
Del Norte	7,980	62	27,558	28,957.1
El Dorado	35,031	247	193,098	18,141.6
Fresno	297,758	3,030	1,032,227	28,846.2
Glenn	5,847	58	29,348	19,923.0
Humboldt	23,575	171	134,098	17,580.4
Imperial	71,664	983	191,649	37,393.4
Inyo	4,822	63	18,453	26,131.3
Kern	232,213	2,503	927,251	25,043.2
Kings	63,296	486	156,444	40,459.2
Lake	13,789	164	64,871	21,256.0
Lassen	10,301	67	30,065	34,262.4
Los Angeles	3,520,044	36,064	10,257,557	34,316.6
Madera	46,819	378	160,089	29,245.6
Marin	41,582	260	260,800	15,944.0
Mariposa	3,386	33	17,795	19,027.8
Mendocino	17,033	146	88,439	19,259.6
Merced	78,129	903	287,420	27,182.9
Modoc	985	11	9,475	10,395.8
Mono	3,344	8	13,961	23,952.4
Monterey	98,885	812	448,732	22,036.5
Napa	35,015	186	139,652	25,073.0
Nevada	20,465	139	98,710	20,732.4
Orange	720,401	8,153	3,228,519	22,313.7
Placer	82,329	685	400,434	20,559.9
Plumas	3,866	15	18,997	20,350.6
Riverside	740,478	6,887	2,468,145	30,001.4
Sacramento	376,977	3,598	1,567,975	24,042.3
San Benito	17,853	120	64,022	27,885.7
San Bernardino	715,637	8,172	2,217,398	32,273.7
San Diego	994,709	5,866	3,370,418	29,512.9
San Francisco	199,950	1,214	892,280	22,408.9
San Joaquin	212,400	2,453	782,545	27,142.2
San Luis Obispo	67,039	577	278,862	24,040.2
San Mateo	186,223	753	778,001	23,936.1
Santa Barbara	113,288	771	456,373	24,823.6
Santa Clara	483,428	2,801	1,967,585	24,569.6
Santa Cruz	69,447	276	273,999	25,345.7
Shasta	36,728	612	177,925	20,642.4
Sierra	313	5	3,115	10,048.2
Siskiyou	5,531	97	43,956	12,583.0
Solano	115,442	483	444,255	25,985.5
Sonoma	115,232	574	496,668	23,201.0
Stanislaus	146,648	1,846	562,303	26,079.9
Sutter	26,023	241	105,747	24,608.7
Tehama	14,579	237	65,885	22,128.0
Trinity	1,482	25	13,354	11,097.8
Tulare	129,591	1,597	484,423	26,751.6
Tuolumne	17,037	212	52,351	32,543.8
Ventura	222,570	1,704	852,747	26,100.4
Yolo	50,627	454	223,612	22,640.6
Yuba	20,254	136	79,290	25,544.2
Final update May 18, 2023, with data through the previous Tuesday; Data is publicly reported by California Department of Public Health

Charts of medical cases by county:

- Santa Clara County (for tabular data, see COVID-19 cases)
- Alameda County (for tabular data, see COVID-19 cases)
View source data.
7-day moving average of new daily cases:
7-day moving average
View source data.
View source data.
View source data.

Weekly all-cause deaths in California:

View source data.

== Impact ==
=== Cancellations, closures and postponements ===
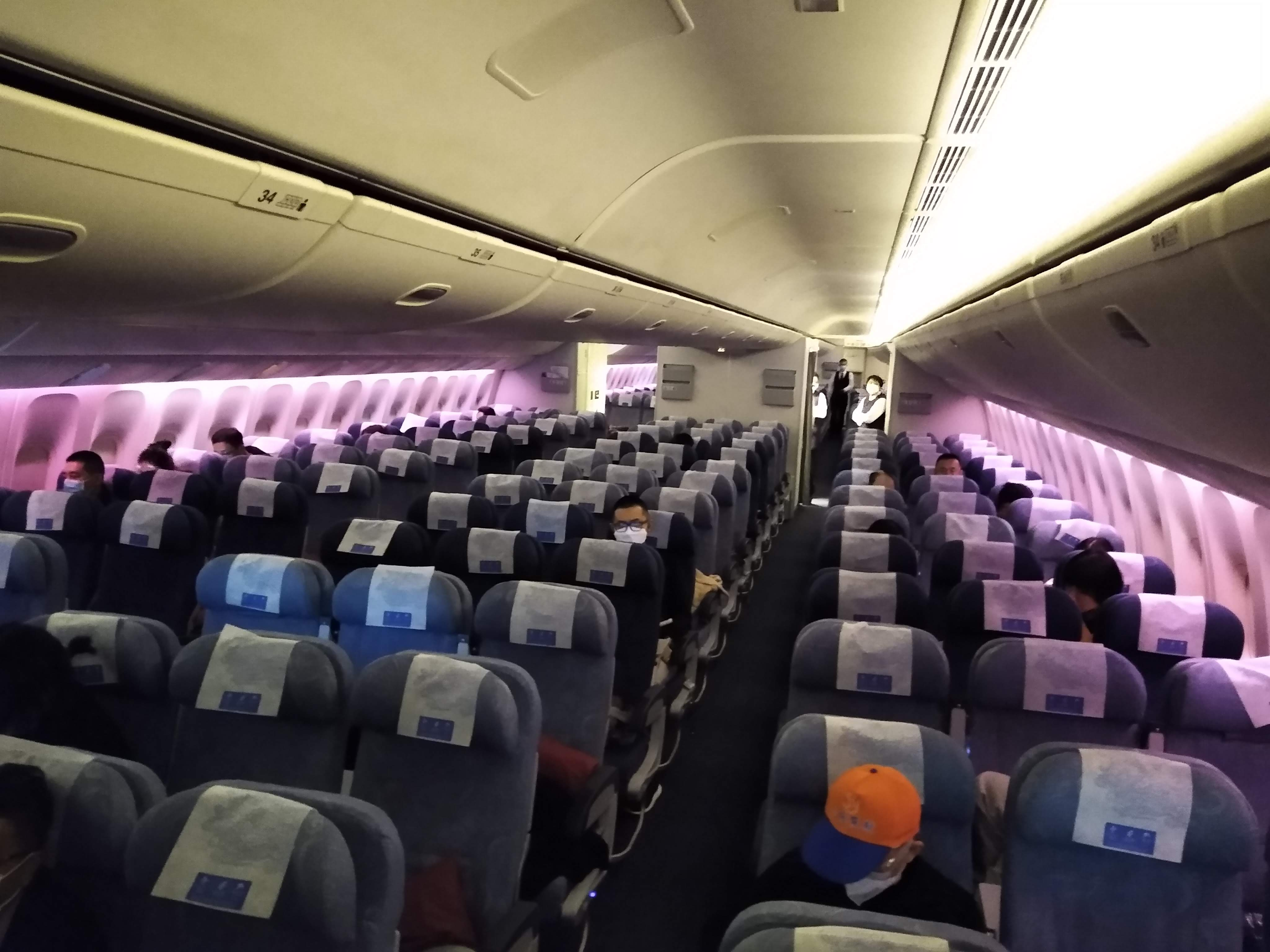
A nearly empty flight from Beijing to Los Angeles on March 15, 2020

=== Effects on education ===
Education in California was impacted by the COVID-19 pandemic. Most students in the state switched to distance learning as a result of the COVID-19 pandemic, although thousands of them lacked laptops and Wi-Fi. By April 10, 2020, the only school remaining open in the state was Outside Creek Elementary, a school of 21 students in the San Joaquin Valley. By April 29, the school closed indefinitely, making it the last school in the state to do so.

- K–12: On March 17, 2020, the California Department of Education provided guidance for K–12 schools. This included information regarding: Distance learning, resources that support distance learning, remote learning guidance, designing a high-quality online course, grading and graduation requirements, and internet access; school meals; Special education; child care and student supervision in the event of a school closure; and parent resources. The state also authorized $5.3 billion in the 2020-21 budget for Learning Loss Mitigation Funds, designed to help schools improve teaching and learning and access to virtual school.
- California Community Colleges System (CCCS) issued guidance regarding Novel Coronavirus 2019. On May 18, Chancellor Eloy Ortiz Oakley said that California's 115 community colleges will likely continue to offer their classes fully online in the fall, noting that many colleges in the system had already announced this intention. Oakley added that he fully encouraged this decision as he believes it "will be the most relevant way for us to continue to reach our students and to do it in a way that commits to maintaining equity for our students."
- California State University (CSU) system: On March 17, 2020, CSU issued a response to the COVID-19 outbreak, including that "the CSU is following guidance provided by the Centers for Disease Control and the U.S. Department of State". The communication also included information regarding a plan for CSU's 23 campuses to accelerate their transition to online instruction. On May 12, California State University Chancellor Timothy White announced that the CSU system would be offering fall 2020 courses primarily online "with some limited exceptions." For spring 2020 alone, the CSU system was projecting a revenue loss of $337 million due to the pandemic, as a result of losses from student housing, parking and campus bookstores, combined with costs related to cleaning, overtime and the shift to distance education.
- University of California (UC) system: On April 2, 2020, UC president Janet Napolitano and the chancellors of the 10 campuses gave assurances to UC employees. On April 6, 2020, the UC Health Data Initiative launched daily updates on COVID-19 tests. On the same day, the UC launched a grant program to spur COVID-19 related research. Pertinent information for students, faculty, staff, and community is available for each campus: UC Berkeley, UC Davis, UC Irvine, UCLA, UC Merced, UC Riverside, UC San Diego, UC San Francisco, UC Santa Barbara, and UC Santa Cruz. On May 20, University of California president Janet Napolitano told the UC Board of Regents that "every campus will be open and offering instruction" in fall 2020, adding that she "anticipates that most, if not all of our campuses, will operate in some kind of hybrid mode" involving a mix of online and in-person instruction. From the time that UC campuses shut down in mid-March through the end of April, the UC system experienced a $1.2 billion loss due to the pandemic.

=== Effects on prisons ===
During the initial lockdowns, county jails took steps to reduce the number of people in jail, hoping that this would reduce the risk of COVID-19 infections spreading through the jails. Some inmates developed COVID-19. Other measures undertaken included in-cell meals, preventing visitors, and suspension of activity programs.

In the state prisons, factories continued operations even after COVID-19 outbreaks happened in the prisons. Rehab programs, religious services, and educational classes were all stopped, but the prison factories continued operating, where inmates worked for hours without wearing masks.

=== Effects on religion ===
Various faith organizations claim that social distancing orders issued by the state violated the constitutional right to freedom of religion and assembly. Bans of all gatherings, no matter the size, outside of places of residences put in place by local authorities were also challenged.

On March 13, the Catholic Diocese of San Jose in California closed all diocesan schools from until at least April 20. It suspended public Masses and dispensed with the obligation to attend Mass from March 14 until further notice. On March 18, the California Catholic Conference of bishops followed suit, suspending the public celebration of Mass throughout the state until further notice. Many churches are conducting services online during the time of closure.

The United States Supreme Court denied to grant an emergency injunction on Newsom's May orders limiting churches to 25% capacity or 100 persons maximum ahead of the Pentecost on May 31.

In two ongoing cases, the Supreme Court granted two orders on February 5, 2021, that enjoined the state from banning religious services in the Tier 1 areas, though agreed that the state may limit capacity to 25% of the church and can ban singing and chanting under the pandemic conditions. The orders found that California may have reason to restrict capacity, but they cannot restrict that capacity to zero, and that California has shown unequal treatment of religious groups compared to other industries, particularly Hollywood.

=== Effects on sports ===
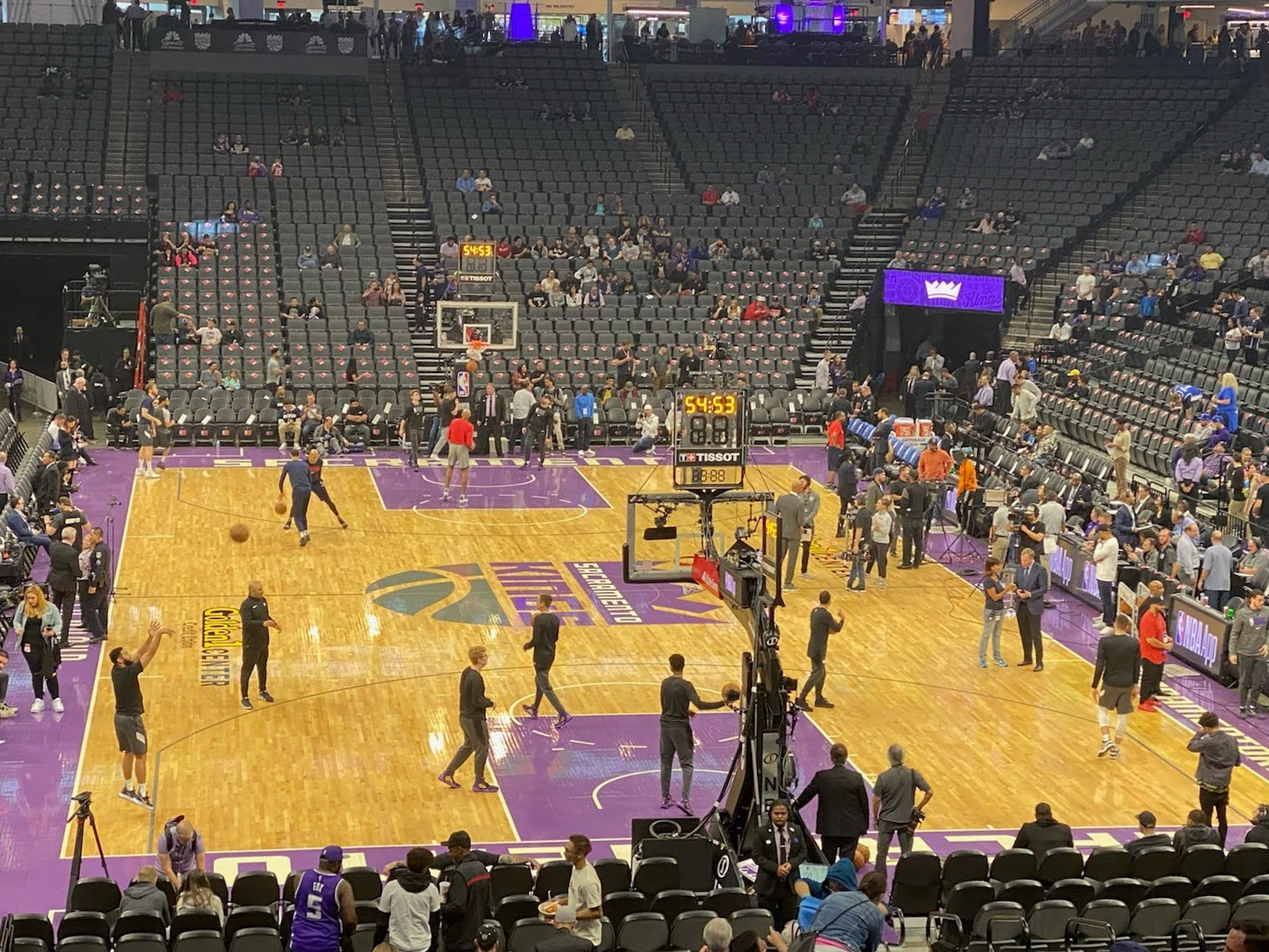
Sacramento Kings players shoot around after their March 11 game against New Orleans is postponed

The first U.S. sports cancellations attributed to the pandemic occurred in California; in accordance with a local health emergency in Riverside County, the 2020 BNP Paribas Open tennis tournaments at Indian Wells were postponed on March 8, 2020. The 2021 edition of the tournament was also postponed indefinitely and eventually took place on October 6–17, 2021.

After Santa Clara County banned all large gatherings larger than 1,000 people for a three-week period beginning March 11, the San Jose Sharks of the NHL and the Golden State Warriors of the NBA announced that all of their remaining home games of the regular season would be played behind closed doors with no spectators. With their game on March 12 against the Brooklyn Nets, the Warriors were to be the first professional sports team in the United States to play a home game behind closed doors due to the pandemic. However, on March 11, after Utah Jazz players tested positive for COVID-19, the NBA suspended its regular season, and almost all other professional sports leagues and college athletics programs followed suit over the days that followed.

On March 16, the CCCAA also canceled the remainder of the winter seasons as well as the spring seasons. They also restored a season of eligibility to those athletes who had already participated in the early season of spring sports. The NAIA canceled their spring season on the same day. Also on March 16, the Ojai Tennis Tournament, the oldest and largest amateur tennis tournament in the United States, canceled its 2020 event; the 2021 edition was later nixed as well.

At the high school level, the California Interscholastic Federation (CIF) canceled the basketball state championship tournament after the Northern California and Southern California semifinals. During the tournament, Sheldon, Archbishop Riordan, and the Menlo School withdrew from the tournament after their schools were shut down. The CIF gave their reevaluation of the situation on April 3 and cancelled all spring sports.

In motorsports, the NASCAR Cup Series canceled the 2020 Toyota/Save Mart 350 in Sonoma, as Sonoma County would not allow sporting events and any other mass gathering to occur at that time. The IndyCar Series was required to cancel the 2020 Grand Prix of Long Beach, and the Monterey Grand Prix (which had initially been rescheduled as a twin race weekend to make up for other cancelled races). In December 2020, it was announced that NASCAR's 2021 race weekend (including the Cup Series Auto Club 400) at Auto Club Speedway in Fontana would be canceled (with the race weekend moved to Daytona International Speedway's road course). Accordingly, a planned reconstruction of the track was also postponed to 2022 It was also announced that the 2021 IndyCar Series schedule would be modified to move the Grand Prix of Long Beach from April to September as the season finale, with organizers stating that this would "afford us the best opportunity to provide our guests with a fun and exciting experience in a safe and unrestricted environment."

The Pac-12 Conference (which includes several universities in California) delayed its college football season to November, and all games were closed to the public. On December 19, 2020, it was announced that the 2021 Rose Bowl (a College Football Playoff semi-final game) would be re-located from Pasadena to AT&T Stadium in Arlington, Texas due to the current surge in local cases, and inability to invite the families of players as spectators. It was the first time since 1942 (due to wartime restrictions on public gatherings on the west coast following the Pearl Harbor attack) that the Rose Bowl was not held in Pasadena.

=== Effects on the economy ===
As of April 8, 2020, over the preceding three weeks, California had processed over 2.4 million applications for unemployment assistance. A survey conducted April 17 found that fewer than half of the residents of Los Angeles County were employed, although some of this unemployment was supposed to be temporary.

In January 2020, California expected a $5.6 billion surplus in the state budget by the time the fiscal year ended on June 30. In May, however, the Department of Finance changed its projection, saying that the state would instead have a deficit of $54.3 billion. Some of this shortfall was caused by expenses for COVID-19 response (an unanticipated $7.1 billion for health programs and an additional $6 billion for other types of responses), but most was caused by the expectation that tax revenue—personal income, corporate, and sales—will be one-quarter lower than originally projected. However, in January 2021, California revised its earlier estimate and instead expected a $15 billion one-time budget surplus, largely due to increased tax revenues from wealthy residents who were doing better than expected. In May 2021, Governor Newsom announced that the state's budget surplus had grown to $75.7 billion.

=== Effects on migration and California's population ===
From 2020 to 2022 California's population declined from 39,501,653 to 39,029,342, a net loss of roughly 500,000 people. The majority of the population decline is due to Californians moving to other states. High cost of living and housing prices create a significant challenge for Californians and are a major reason for people leaving. Since the pandemic began, the rate of population loss in California due to migration within the United States had doubled. The highest number of people moving due in part to COVID-19 occurred in November 2020, with roughly 20% of movers reporting the pandemic to be a factor in their decision.

The three main pandemic-related reasons for moving were to be closer to family, ability to work from home, and job loss. The first two reasons are a result of the shift to online work; people were able to move closer to their families or move to more affordable, attractive cities as they were no longer tied to a certain city where they worked in person. The last reason is a result of people moving to states where they could resume working as California's COVID-19 policy did not allow their job to continue. Local restrictions and spread of the COVID-19 were not often cited reasons for moving in the survey.

== Vaccination ==
Groups eligible for vaccination
Group	Eligibility date
Healthcare workers and long-term care residents	December 14, 2020
All residents age 65+	January 14, 2021
Workers at high risk of workplace exposure	February 15, 2021
Residents age 16–64 with underlying conditions	March 15, 2021
All residents age 50–64	April 1, 2021
All residents age 16–49	April 15, 2021
All residents age 12–15	May 13, 2021
All residents age 5–11	November 3, 2021
All residents age 6 months - 4 years	

On November 13, 2021, California expanded booster dose availability to all adults, against the recommendations of federal officials.

=== Challenges and overall progress ===
Following administration of the first vaccinations on December 14, 2020, the rollout of COVID-19 vaccinations in California proceeded slowly. The effort was hampered by a variety of factors, including vaccine supply shortages, poor communication between federal and state authorities, and shortages in both the supply of vaccines as well as persons to administer them. The problems were exacerbated by the state's large, decentralized structure, which resulted in a delegation of the response to 61 local health departments and resulted in a piecemeal effort with widespread regional disparities. The rollout was initially slowed by restricting it to health care workers and nursing homes: Other groups were held back while the state worked to complete vaccination of the first groups. Vaccine eligibility then shifted from specific groups of workers to prioritizing the elderly, which drew criticism from some laborers. Elderly populations were disadvantaged by the vaccination rollout, experiencing long lines, lack of seating, lack of restroom facilities and in some cases requiring QR codes on cell phones or printed paper to prove eligibility. Minority residents of the state were in addition found to be receiving a smaller share of the vaccines in the initial months than their fraction of the population. In order to address these discrepancies, the governor announced in early March 2021 that the state would be setting aside 40% of its COVID-19 vaccine doses for the hardest-hit communities and establish a "vaccine equity metric".

As of November 3, 2021, California has administered 54,681,532 COVID-19 vaccine doses at a daily rate of 158,924 doses. Overall, 74.8% of the population has received their first dose, 61.5% has been fully vaccinated, and 6.2% has received a booster dose. 85.3% of the state's supply has been used. The state has administered the largest number of doses nationwide, and is 12th of 50 states in terms of per capita dose administration. Mass vaccination sites in certain regions continued to experience severe shortages as of March 2021.

=== Vaccination sites ===
In January 2021, when most of California was in phase 1A of vaccine distribution (medical personnel and nursing home residents only), California had no central website about when and where vaccinations were happening, and it was among the worst at vaccine distribution efficiency in the U.S., with only 37 percent of its 4.4 million doses having been administered by January 20. Volunteers created Vaccinate CA, an information website to help people find appointments to . This was eventually superseded by a website, called My Turn, created by the state.

As of February 12, 2021, a website had been established by the state for scheduling and/or being notified of eligibility for COVID-19 vaccines, and vaccination providers expanded throughout the state to include retail pharmacies, federal mass vaccination sites, and local health clinics. As of March 4, 2021, a state-government provided directory of vaccination sites had yet to be established, which has prompted the development of VaccinateCA, a crowdsourced volunteer website listing vaccination sites in the state in a dynamic manner as the number of sites and locations continuously vary.

=== Digital vaccination cards ===
The California Digital COVID-19 Vaccine Record has the same information as a CDC vaccine card: name, birthdate, vaccination dates and vaccine type. It will also include a QR code that can be scanned by a SMART Health Card app for proof of vaccination as an official record of the state of California. The SMART Health Card Verifier app is a free download for iOS and Android to scan and verify a vaccination record.

"The Digital COVID-19 Vaccine Record is easy to use: a person enters their name, date of birth, and an email or mobile phone number associated with their vaccine record. After creating a 4-digit PIN, the user receives a link to their vaccine record that will open upon re-entry of the PIN. The record shows the same information as the paper CDC vaccine card: name, date of birth, date of vaccinations, and vaccine manufacturer. It also includes a QR code that makes these same details readable by a QR scanner."

This uses the open-source SMART Health Card framework. Mitre Corporation co-leads the Vaccination Credential Initiative coalition. Brian Anderson is the Chief Digital Physician at Mitre Corporation and a co-founder of Vaccination Credential Initiative. It is related to the CommonPass, an international standard designed by the World Economic Forum and The Commons Project.

== Endemic management ==
On February 17, 2022, Governor Gavin Newsom announced a formal shift toward endemic management of COVID-19 in California, saying "we are moving past the crisis phase into a phase where we will work to live with this virus".

== See also ==
- Travel restrictions related to the COVID-19 pandemic
- Timeline of the COVID-19 pandemic in the United States
- COVID-19 pandemic in the United States – for impact on the country
- COVID-19 pandemic – for worldwide impact
- COVID-19 vaccination in the United States
