= Pioneer Union Elementary School District =

Pioneer Union Elementary School District can refer to one of several school districts within California:

- Pioneer Union Elementary School District (Butte County) serving Berry Creek, California in Butte County
- Pioneer Union Elementary School District (Kings County) serving Hanford, California in Kings County
- Pioneer Union School District serving Somerset, California in El Dorado County
