= Education in California =

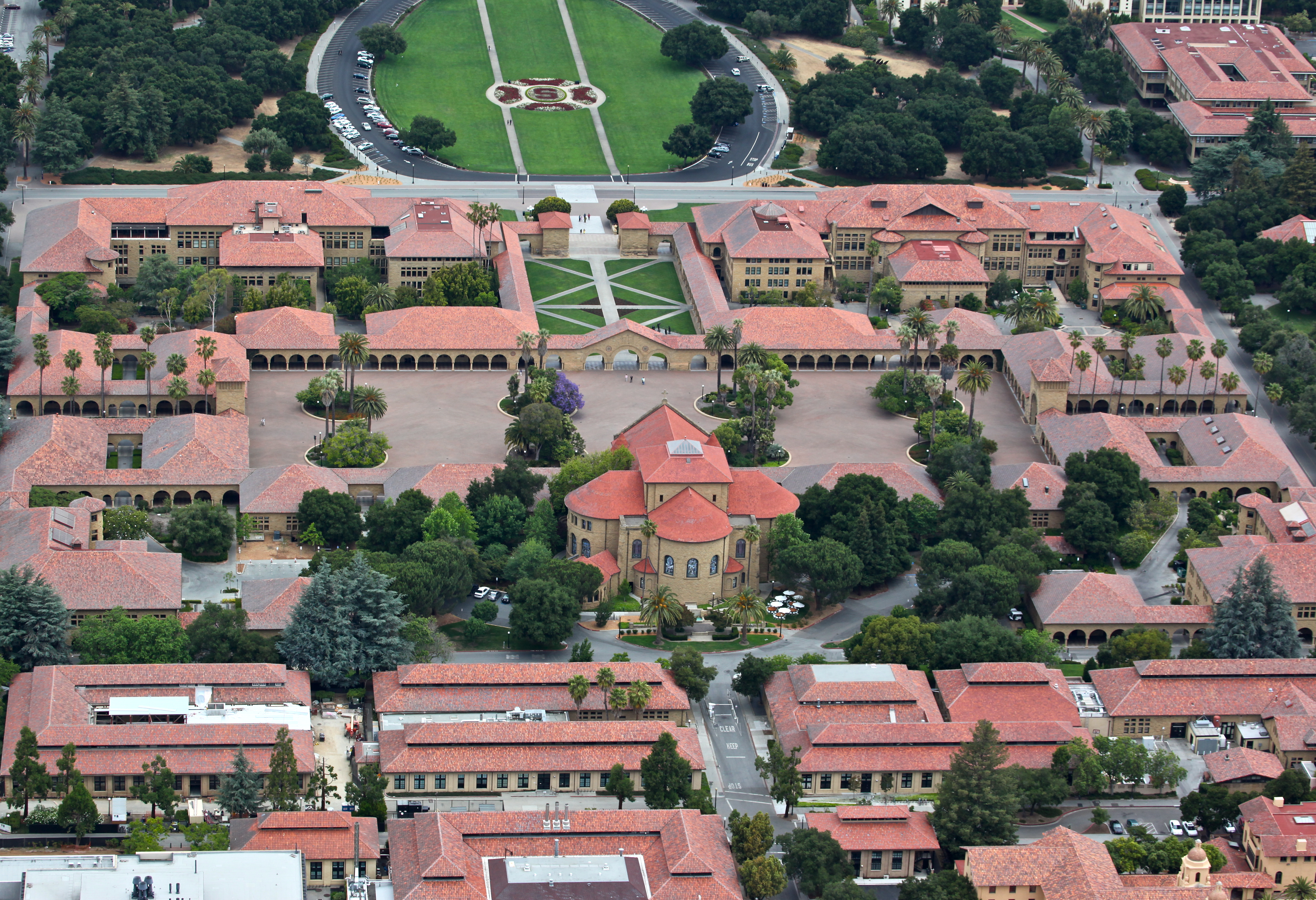
Stanford University, located in the Santa Clara Valley, is one of the top universities in the world.

The educational system in California consists of public, NPS, and private schools in the U.S. state of California, including the public University of California, California State University, and California Community Colleges systems, private colleges and universities, and elementary, middle, and high schools.

== K–12 ==
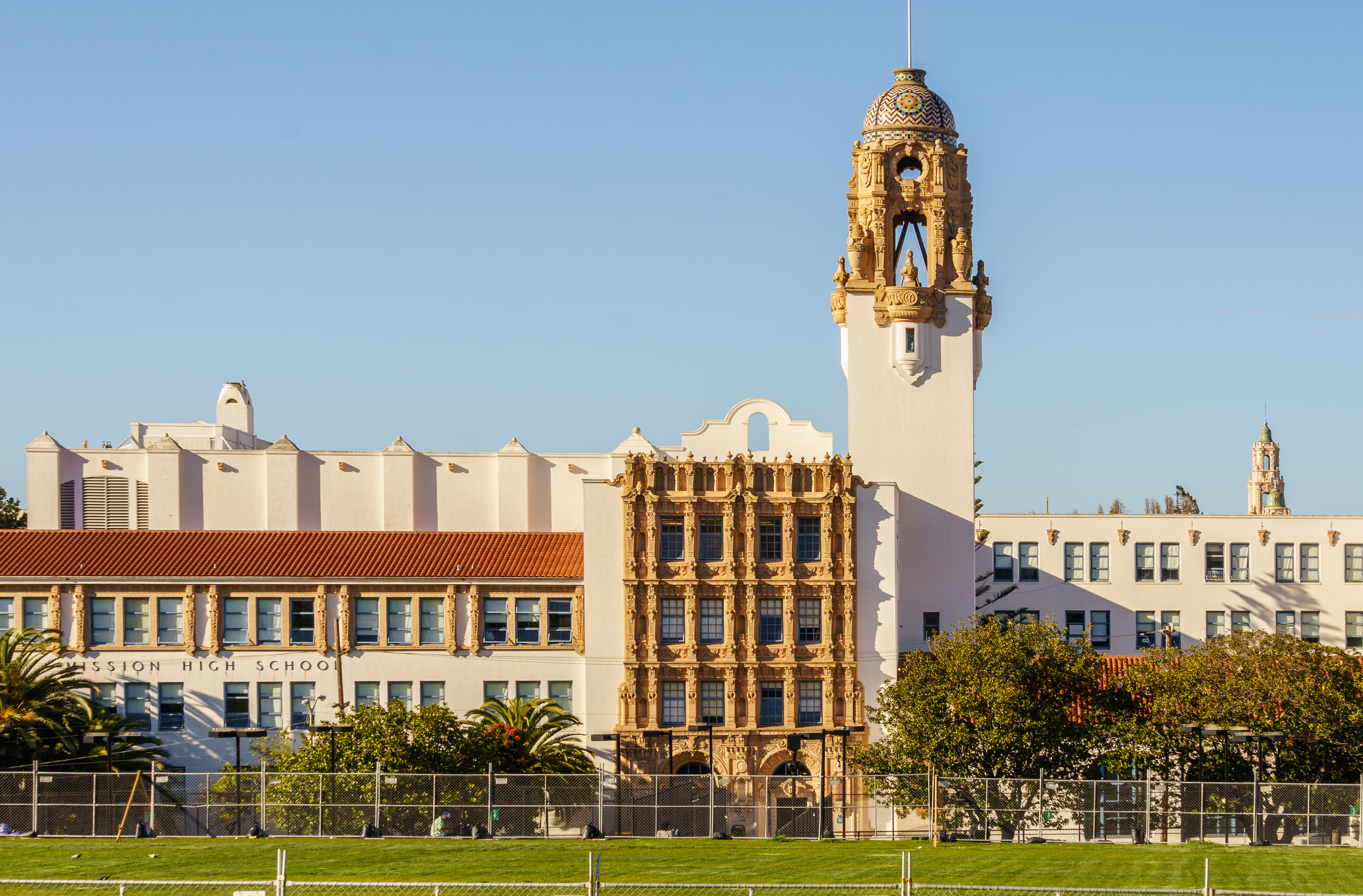
Mission High School, founded in 1890, is located in San Francisco.

California serves over 6 million K - 12 students, making it the largest public school system in the United States. About 25% of school students are English learners, compared to 9% nationally.Approximately 22% of African Americans and Hispanic Californians are living in poverty and only 68% of students living below the poverty line will graduate from high school]. The state of California implemented the Dropout Recovery and Prevention Act (SB 65) in 1985 to address high school and elementary dropout rates. The program was expanded in 2004 due to its success in lowering the state's dropout rate. Senate Bill 65 initiated three new dropout prevention efforts: the Pupil Motivation and Maintenance Program, the Alternative Education Outreach Consultant (AEOC) Program, and the Educational Clinic Program.

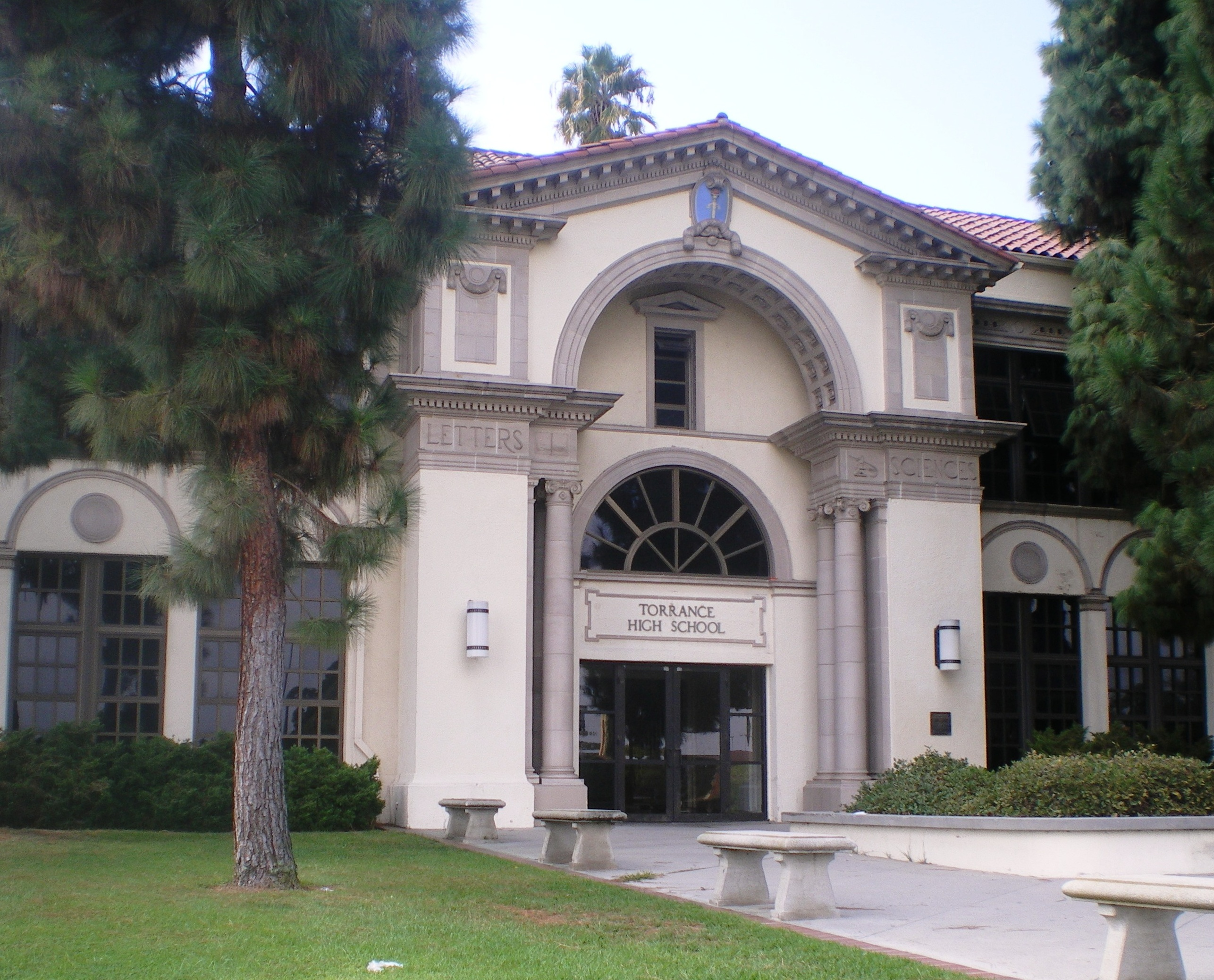
Torrance High School, founded in 1917, is located in Torrance.

According to then Governor Jerry Brown "almost 30% are either undocumented or don't speak English." Here the then governor was highlighting the linguistics and immigration diversity within the state of California. Since then the population of students who identify as English Second Language (ESL) has also increased in the state.

=== Funding levels, costs, and metrics ===
In the 2024, National Assessment of Educational Progress California 4th graders' test scores in the subjects of mathematics and reading were in the bottom 15 of all states and territories.

For the 2022-2023 school year, California K-12 public school teachers had the highest average pay in the nation, at $95,160.

In 2016, California's K–12 public school per-pupil spending was ranked 22nd in the nation ($11,500/student vs. $11,800 for the US average).

For 2012, California's public schools ranked 48th in the number of employees per student, at 0.102 (the US average was 0.137), while paying the 7th most per employee, $49,000 (the US average was $39,000).

California public schools are funded through four main revenue streams: Local Control Funding Formula (LCFF), Federal Revenue, Other State revenue, and Other Local revenue. LCFF makes up the largest chunk of public school funding, including property and local taxes. Federal revenue is a significantly smaller portion of funding, given as part of free or reduced lunch programs and other federal-based aid programs.

Other state and local revenue make up less significant revenue streams. Schools receive a general, “basic aid” amount, based on a formula for the grades a school holds, number of students, etc… In a "basic aid" district, property taxes generate more revenue than the funding limit, a benchmark set by the state to qualify for additional funding. Of the 944 school districts in California, 80 are labeled basic aid, 40 of which are in the Bay Area.

Because LCFF is the largest portion of public school funding, schools capable of generating more LCFF funding often have more overall funding per student, but it’s those same districts that already have well-off families and students. This issue is prominent in East San Jose, CA, where Alum Rock Union School District receives about 25% less funding than Saratoga Union School District per student. Homes in the Alum Rock region sell for between $589,100 and $686,100 and Saratoga homes sell for over $2 million.

=== Public school facilities ===
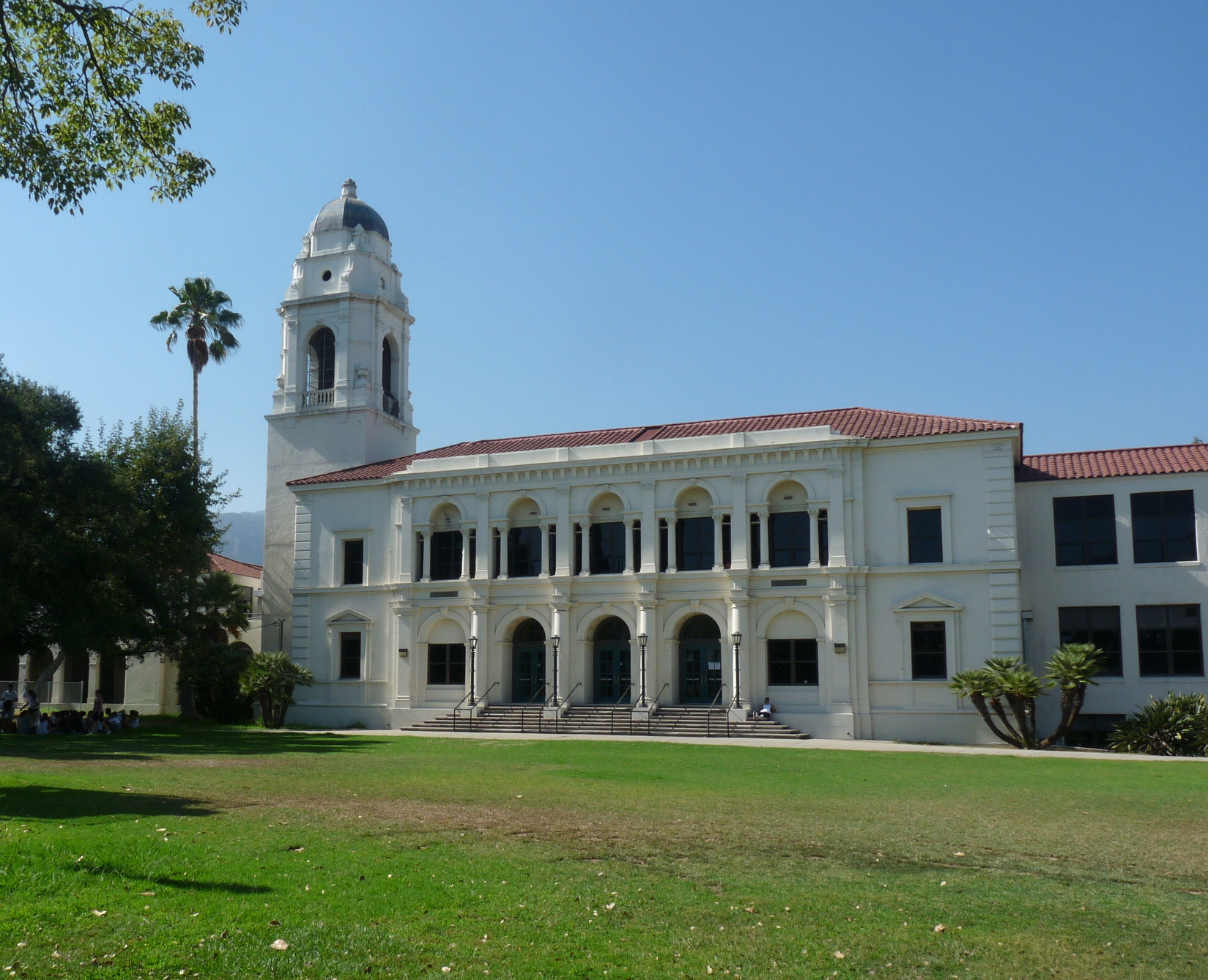
Monrovia High School, founded in 1893, in Monrovia.

Many public school facilities throughout California are in various stages of disrepair. In a report to the public, the federal government noted that 75% of California schools, 13,096 in total, were in need of renovation and modernization. Furthermore, the renovations and modernizations needed were required to elevate the schools standing/rating to "good". A 2007 report by the U.S. Government Accountability office estimated that it would cost roughly $112 billion dollars to bring all K–12 public school buildings in line with building codes.

- In 2014 at a meeting of the Fremont School Board, it was made public that students could not study effectively due to the Heating and Air Conditioning (HVAC) not working.
- In 2003 students at Fremont High School in Los Angeles voiced their feelings of humiliation with regards to the needed repairs at their school.

=== Nonpublic Nonsectarian Schools ===
“Nonpublic, nonsectarian school” (NPS) means a private, nonsectarian school that enrolls individuals with exceptional needs pursuant to an individualized education program and is certified by the department. Unlike private schools, tuition for the NPS is paid for by the Local Educational Agencies (LEA) and the schools must conform to California Department of Education standards.

== Universities and colleges ==
=== Public universities ===
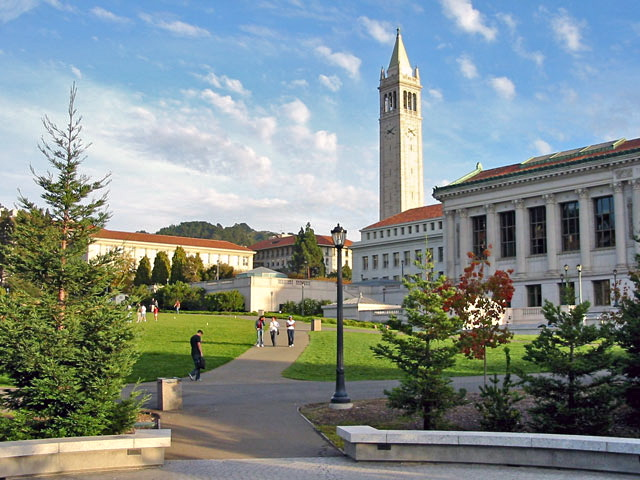
The University of California, Berkeley is the flagship school of the University of California system.

The main state research university is the University of California (UC). The University of California has ten major campuses. Each major UC campus is headed by a chancellor that is appointed by the Regents of the University of California.

The ten major campuses of the University of California are located in Berkeley, Los Angeles, San Diego, Davis, Santa Cruz, Santa Barbara, Irvine, Riverside, Merced and San Francisco. The University of California, San Francisco, teaches only graduate health-sciences students. The UC Hastings College of the Law, also in San Francisco, is affiliated with UC, but is not administered by the UC Regents. The UC system was originally intended to accept students from the top one-eighth (1/8th) of California high school graduates, however several of the schools in the UC system have become even more selective. The awarding of doctoral degrees from California public universities was originally intended to be the sole domain of the UC system, however several doctoral degrees are now also awarded by the Cal State system.

The University of California also administers one national laboratory directly for the United States Department of Energy: Lawrence Berkeley National Laboratory. The university indirectly manages Los Alamos National Laboratory through Los Alamos National Security, LLC and Lawrence Livermore National Laboratory through Lawrence Livermore National Security, LLC.

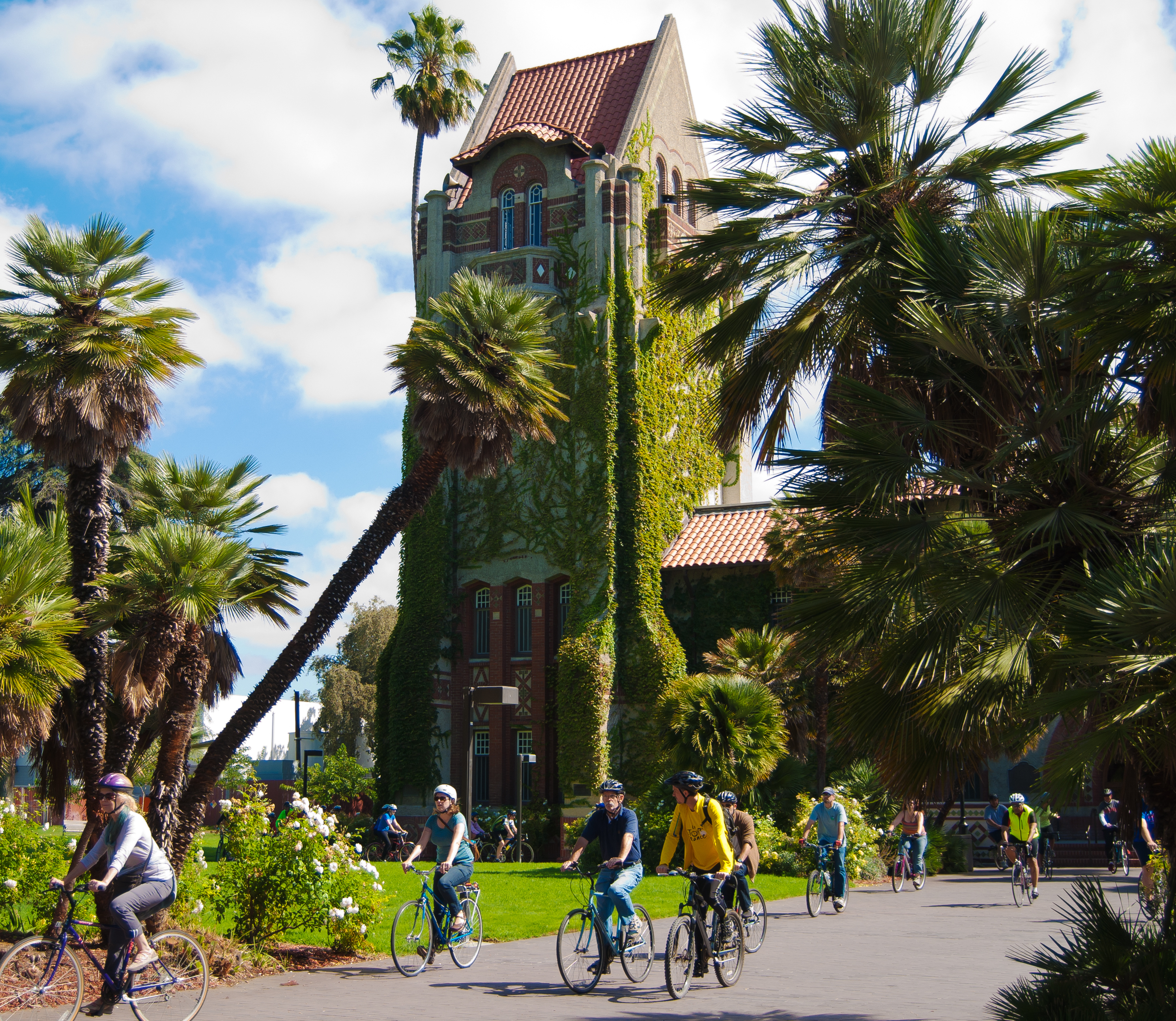
San José State University is the oldest public university on the West Coast and the founding campus of the California State University system.

The California State University (CSU) system describes itself as the largest four-year public university system in the United States. The CSU was originally intended to accept students from the top one-third (1/3rd) of California high school graduates, however several of the schools in the CSU system have become much more selective. Many of the larger campuses, such as Cal Poly, Cal Poly Pomona, Long Beach State, Cal State Fullerton, Cal State San Bernardino, Fresno State, Sacramento State, San Francisco State, San Diego State, and San José State (the oldest public university in California) have become more research oriented than they were in the past. A marked change and a shift from the California Master Plan for Higher Education began in 2007 with the CSU gaining the ability to grant doctoral level degrees in education (Ed.D.). The CSU has since gained the authority to grant many other Doctoral degrees, such as the Doctor of Nursing Practice, the Doctor of Physical Therapy, and the Au.D. The CSU also has the ability to grant joint Ph.D.s with other universities. Kevin Starr (State Librarian emeritus) and others have argued that this small change is the beginning of a larger reorganization of higher education in California.

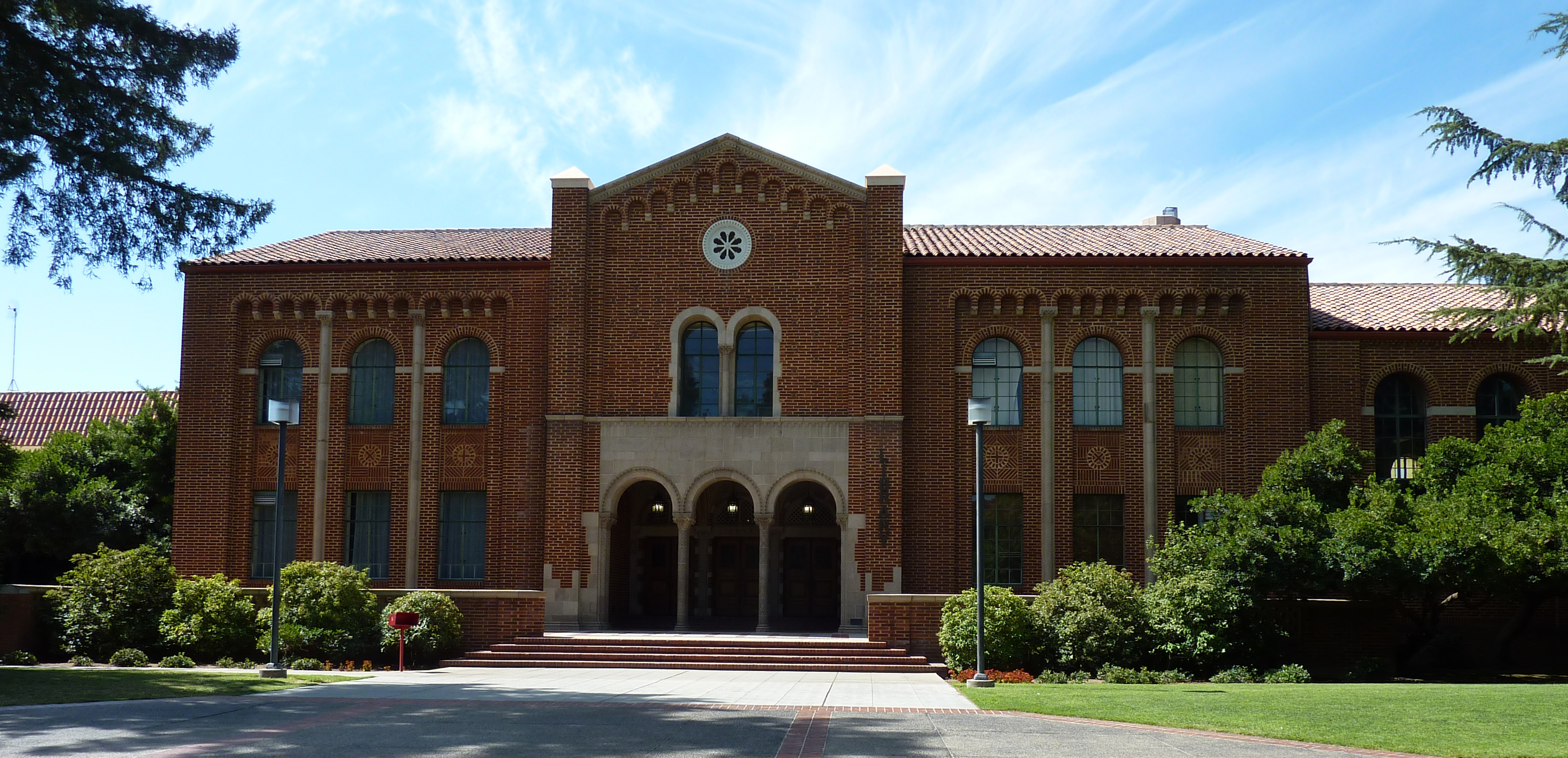
Fresno City College, founded in 1910, is the oldest campus of the California Community Colleges system.

The California Community Colleges system provides lower division "General Education" courses, whose credit units are transferable to the CSU and UC systems, as well as vocational education, remedial education, and continuing education programs. It awards certificates and associate degrees. It is composed of 112 colleges organized into 72 districts, serving a student population of over 2.9 million. The system also provides the education certification, basic training, and some advanced training to all police officers, fire fighters and Emergency Medical Tech's in the state either directly (via on campus academies) or indirectly (via affiliations with police / sheriff department's and fire department's "in house" academies).

=== Private universities ===
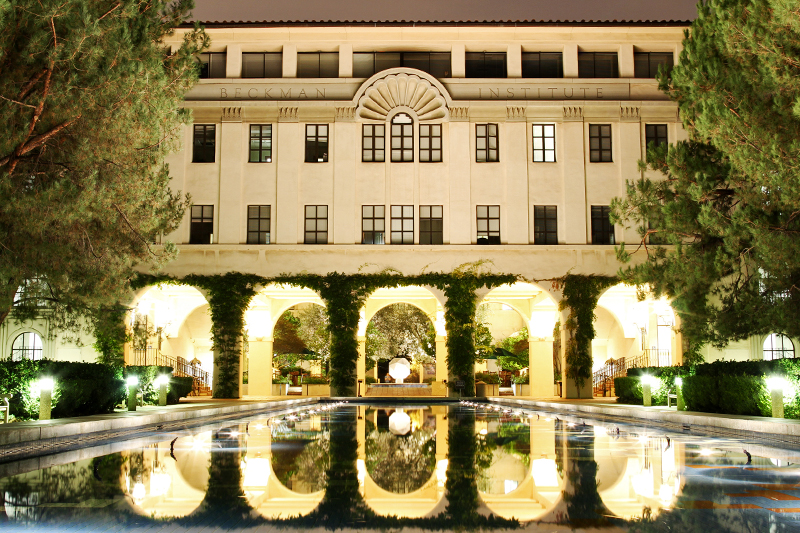
The California Institute of Technology is one of the most selective research universities in the world.

California has hundreds of other private colleges and universities, including many religious and special-purpose institutions. This leads to many unique entertainment and educational opportunities for residents. The San Francisco Bay area and greater Los Angeles have an abundance of these private universities, with some of the highest densities of post-secondary institutions in the world.

== See also ==
- California Open Source Textbook Project
- Spanish bilingual education in California
- California mission project
- School segregation in California
- List of high schools in California
- List of school districts in California
