= List of oldest schools in California =

Here is a partial list of the oldest schools in California.

== 1795 ==
- The first recorded school in California was opened in 1795 by Manuel de Vargas, a retired sergeant, in San Jose.

== 1847 ==
- The first English-language school in California opened at Mission Santa Clara in 1847. It was founded by Olive Mann Isbell, who started the school with 25 pupils in a small adobe at the Mission Santa Clara for $2 a month. The school later moved that spring to Monterey.

== 1849 ==
- Following the establishment of a public school system in the 1849 Constitution (debated and written in Colton Hall), Colton Hall in Monterey served as the area's public school 1849–1851. Built from 1847 to 1849 as Monterey's town hall and school house from 1847 to 1849, it also served as the public school from 1872 to 1896.

== 1851 ==
- California Wesleyan College is founded and chartered on July 10, 1851, and immediately changed its name to University of the Pacific. The school changed its name again to College of the Pacific in 1911 and back to University of the Pacific in 1961. It is the first and oldest university in California. Its original campus was in Santa Clara; it then moved to College Park in San Jose (which is now the location of Bellarmine College Preparatory); and lastly moved to Stockton in 1924.
- Santa Clara College is founded, which later became University of Santa Clara and is now known as Santa Clara University in Santa Clara. Although it did not receive its charter for several years, Santa Clara was the first institution of higher education in California to enroll students.
- College of Notre Dame in Belmont, now known as Notre Dame de Namur University, is founded. This was the first women's college in California. The university is now co-ed.
- The pre-collegiate division of Santa Clara College later became Santa Clara Preparatory and then Bellarmine College Preparatory in San Jose. This is the first oldest high school in California.
- Notre Dame High School in San Jose is founded. This is first all-girls high school was founded in Santa Clara to complement the College of Santa Clara.

== 1852 ==
- Spring Valley Science School in San Francisco. This is the oldest public school in California. It is the only one of the original 7 gold rush schools in San Francisco that is still in existence.
- Mills College, the oldest women's college west of the Rockies, is founded in Benicia, California. It moved to its current location in Oakland in 1871.
- Ophir School in Ophir Ca was founded. It was the 1st school in Placer County. The school burned down in 1873 and at that time was a one-room school. In 1873 a new school was built on the present site. in 1881 there were 69 boys and 68 girls but only 2 teachers. It is still in operation today.

== 1853 ==
Shasta Elementary Union School District | Shasta Union Elementary School

== 1854 ==
- Oak Grove Elementary School in Sebastopol.
- Saratoga Elementary School in Saratoga.

== 1855 ==
- University of San Francisco is founded as Saint Ignatius Academy. It is the first university in San Francisco. The high school would later separate from the university in 1927.
- Burnett Elementary School in Morgan Hill. The school is named after Peter Burnett, pioneer and first governor of California.
- Linda Elementary School in Linda, California.
- Camptonville Union in Camptonville California.

== 1856 ==
- St. Clare School in Santa Clara is founded. It is the second oldest primary school in California still operating.
- Orchard School began as a school for settlers in San Jose in 1856.
- Lowell High School in San Francisco is founded. It is the oldest public high school west of the Mississippi, and still operating.
- Sacramento High School in Sacramento is the second oldest public high school west of the Mississippi River, and it is still operating.

== 1857 ==
- Minns' Evening Normal School was founded as a private school in San Francisco. It became First Normal School, a public institution, by an act of the California State Legislature on May 2, 1862, and ultimately became San Jose State University.
- Dunbar Elementary School was established in 1857 near its present location.
- Vernon School was established in what is now Verona, Sutter County, California in 1857. The school was housed in a hotel and then the town bowling alley. In 1863 a "new" schoolhouse was built which is still standing. It is possibly the oldest standing schoolhouse in the state.
- Covina High School was founded in 1857, originally as Union High School in Covina, CA. It is the oldest school in the San Gabriel Valley.<covinahigh.net>

== 1858 ==
- Little Shasta Elementary Two Room School in Montague (Siskiyou County) is still operating today. It houses approximately 30 students ranging from kindergarten to sixth grade and it is first Elementary School in State of California.
- Center Unified School District is founded with 4-20 permanent students. It is still operating today.

== 1861 ==
- Chapman University, one of the oldest institutions of higher education in California, is founded under the name Hesperian College, in Woodland, near Sacramento.

== 1862 ==
- Holy Cross Elementary School was founded by the Daughters of Charity and was originally housed in the adobe of the Santa Cruz Mission. It now resides nearby. It continues to offer a comprehensive Catholic and educational program for students from kindergarten through eighth grade.

== 1863 ==
- Saint Mary's College of California is founded in San Francisco. It later moved to Oakland, and moved again in 1928 to its current location in Moraga.
- San Jose High Academy, the oldest public high school in San Jose, is founded.
- Heald College was founded in San Francisco. Eventually, Heald College expanded to twelve campuses in California, Oregon and Hawaii before ceasing operation in 2015.

== 1864 ==
- Toland Medical College, later the UCSF School of Medicine of the University of California, San Francisco is founded in San Francisco. The UCSF School of Medicine is the oldest medical school in California and the Western United States.
- Outside Creek School District, located in Tulare County, is founded. The school district is still in operation serving grades K-8.
- [Browns Elementary School]*located in East nicolaus California is the oldest elementary school in Sutter County, California.

== 1865 ==
- Loyola High School (Los Angeles, California) was founded in 1865 as St. Vincent's College. In 1919, the Vincentians agreed to transfer management of the school to the Jesuits. It is the oldest continuously run educational institution in Southern California.
- Lincoln School, founded in what is now the town of Cupertino in Santa Clara County at the southeast corner of Prospect and Mountain View-Saratoga Roads (presently Saratoga Sunnyvale Road). Lincoln would eventually be incorporated into Cupertino Union School District.

== 1866 ==
- San Pedro Street School is founded in Los Angeles by the predecessor of LAUSD. As of 2021 it remains open at its original site, and is thus the oldest school of any kind in the LAUSD system.

== 1867 ==
- San Antonio School, founded in what is now on the border of Cupertino and South Los Altos in Santa Clara County near the northwest corner of Foothill Bvld. and Cristo Rey Dr. San Antonio would eventually be incorporated into Cupertino Union School District.
- Clear Creek Elementary School is founded in rural Nevada County.

== 1868 ==
- University of California is founded in Oakland; the school moved to its present Berkeley location in 1873 and is now the flagship institution of the UC system.
- Washington Union School District is founded on the outskirts of Salinas.
- Lee School was founded three miles south of the town of Nicolaus, Sutter County and six miles north of the town Vernon on the Garden Highway. It stayed in operation until 1939. One of the early instructors was Harriett Stoddard Lee who is given credit as the founder of Mother's Day in California.
- Union Hill School District is founded just outside of Grass Valley.
- Franklin Elementary School in San Jose.

== 1869 ==
- Collins School, founded in what is now the city of Cupertino at the intersection of Homestead Rd. and Sunnyvale Saratoga Rd. Collins would eventually be incorporated into Cupertino Union School District. The original schoolhouse was replaced by a larger facility in 1889 which is used still today by the Cupertino De Oro Club and is on the city's register of Historical Sites. Collins school would eventually be incorporated into the Cupertino Union School District.
- Oakland High School is founded, the first high school in the East Bay.
- Prescott Elementary School (Oakland, California), was established in 1869 to serve students and families in historic West Oakland. Ida Louise Jackson, Oakland's first African-American teacher, taught here starting in 1925–13 years before any other school hired a black teacher.

== 1870 ==
- St. Vincent Ferrer, one of the oldest schools in Solano County, is established as the Catholic Free School in Vallejo, California. Its first diplomas were received in 1880. It was co-educational until 1968 when the campus was split between St. Vincent's (all girls) and St. Patrick's (all boys). In the Fall of 1987, the school was fully relocated to Benicia Road in Vallejo, CA and renamed St. Patrick-St. Vincent High School. The original high school building remains on Florida Street in Vallejo as a parish building.
- Pioneer Union Elementary School District in Hanford, California. Founded to serve the community of Grangeville.

== 1872 ==
- Santa Clara High School is established in 1872 as a public school serving the City of Santa Clara.

== 1873 ==
- Los Angeles High School, the oldest public high school in Southern California and in the Los Angeles Unified School District, is founded.
- Petaluma High School, the oldest high school in Sonoma County.

== 1874 ==
- Santa Rosa High School is founded, opening the doors to its current location in 1924. It is the 9th school chartered in California history.
- Alameda High School is established by the Alameda Board of Education, starting in several locations before moving to its current location in 1926 to meet a growing student population.

== 1875 ==
- Santa Barbara High School is founded; it is the oldest high school in Santa Barbara County.

== 1876 ==
- St. Mary's High School is founded in Stockton.

Lammersville Elementary School District started as a one-school district, near Tracy, California.

Christian Brothers High School is founded in Sacramento.

== 1878 ==
- Abraham Lincoln High School, the second oldest public high school in Southern California and in the Los Angeles Unified School District, is founded.
- St. Peter's School, the oldest continuous catholic elementary school in San Francisco.

== 1880 ==
- Healdsburg High School opened in Sonoma County.
- The University of Southern California, California's oldest private research university, is founded.
- Berkeley High School opened in Berkeley, in Alameda County.

== 1881 ==
Notre Dame Academy for girls high school is established by the sisters of Notre Dame in Alameda, CA. In 1932 St. Joseph's High School for boys was established by the Brothers of Mary on the same block of Chestnut St. In 1985 the schools combined into a co-ed high school now called Saint Joseph Notre Dame High School.

== 1882 ==
- The Southern Branch of the California State Normal School opens in Los Angeles. This became the Southern Branch of the University of California in 1919 and moved to its present site on the west side of Los Angeles in 1929.
- Pacific Union College is founded as Healdsburg Academy in Healdsburg, California and moved to Angwin, California in 1909. Pacific Union College is the only college in Napa County.
- The Academy of Our Lady of Peace is founded; it is the first and oldest school in San Diego, California.
- San Diego High School, the oldest public high school in San Diego and San Diego County, is founded.
- Castelar Elementary School is founded in Los Angeles's Chinatown.
- Doyle School, located at the corner of Stevens Creek Blvd and Doyle Rd (now paved over by Hwy 280). Doyle was the last of the "original 4" one-room school houses in what later became Cupertino Union School District.

== 1883 ==
- Sierra Normal College (now Placer High School) in Auburn is the oldest high school in Placer County.
- San Bernardino High School in San Bernardino is the oldest high school in San Bernardino County.
- Modesto High School is founded in Modesto.
- Zion Lutheran School, K-8 is founded in Oakland.
- Chaffey College is founded in Ontario.
- Etiwanda School District is founded in 1883

== 1884 ==
- Woodbury University is founded as Woodbury Business College in Los Angeles, making it the second oldest institution of higher learning in Los Angeles.
- Santa Monica High School is founded in Santa Monica.
- Pasadena High School is founded in Pasadena, California.

== 1885 ==
- Chaffey High School is founded by William and George Chaffey in Ontario.

== 1887 ==
- Riverside Polytechnic High School is founded in Riverside, California.
- Occidental College is founded in the Los Angeles neighborhood of Eagle Rock.
- Whittier College, the first Quaker college on the west coast, is founded in Whittier.
- Pomona College, the founding institution of the Claremont Consortium, is founded in Pomona. It moved to Claremont in 1889.
- Chico Normal School (now California State University, Chico) is founded in Chico, the second normal school in the state.
- Cogswell College (or Cogswell Polytechnical College) was founded as a high school in San Francisco and is the first technical training institution in the West. It moved to Cupertino in 1985 and Sunnyvale in 1994.

== 1888 ==
- Santa Barbara Business College, California's oldest technical school, is founded in Santa Barbara.
- San Rafael High School, oldest High School in Marin County, is founded in San Rafael California.

Crafton Elementary School in Redlands, California

== 1889 ==
- Marlborough School, Los Angeles' oldest private school for girls, is founded by Mary Caswell.
- The Thacher School, California's oldest coed boarding school, is founded in Ojai by Sherman Day Thacher.
- Santa Ana High School, the oldest high school in Orange County, is founded.
- Fresno High School is founded.
- Ramona Convent
- Ventura High School is founded.
- Cold Spring School in Montecito, California is founded.

== 1890 ==
- Tulare Union High School is founded in Tulare.
- Mission High School (San Francisco) is founded in the Mission District and moved to its present location in 1896.
- Claremont Grammar School is founded in Claremont. The name was later changed to Sycamore Elementary.
- Dominican University of California in San Rafael was founded in 1890.

== 1891 ==
- Robert Down Elementary School is founded in Pacific Grove, California and known at the time as Pacific Grove Grammar School.
- Leland Stanford Junior University, most commonly referred to simply as Stanford University, is founded at Leland Stanford's horse-breeding farm near Palo Alto.
- The Anna Blake School for Girls opens in Santa Barbara. The school underwent a number of changes in control and mission, ultimately becoming UC Santa Barbara.
- Livermore High School is founded in Livermore.
- Sonoma Valley High School is founded in the town of Sonoma (Sonoma County.) It opens in a building that formerly housed the Presbyterian-affiliated Cumberland College, founded 1859 but which had ceased operations. The high school moves to its current location in 1922.
- Redlands High School is founded. It is the oldest public high school in the state of California still functioning on its original site, and the first "unified high school" formed from three elementary school districts. Its campus includes the historic Clock Auditorium, built in 1928.
- Santa Paula High School, founded in 1889 as the Santa Paula Academy, a private school run by the Congregational Church Association. In 1891 the city agreed with the association to convert the academy to a public school and renamed it Santa Paula High School.
- Fairfax school district
- Elsinore High School, in Wildomar, California, was established in 1891.
- Armijo Union High School, now Armijo High School, opened in 1891 in Fairfield (Solano County).
- The University of La Verne (founded as Lordsburg College) was established in 1891.
- Throop University in Pasadena, renamed the California Institute of Technology in 1920.

== 1892 ==
- Washington High School is founded in Fremont.
- Cloverdale High School opens in Sonoma County.
- Lompoc High School is founded in Lompoc.
- Hayward High School is founded in Hayward.
- Benicia High School in Solano County is founded in Benicia.
- Montebello Elementary School is founded in the hills above present day Cupertino. Montebello closed in 2009, after 117 years of operation.

Watsonville High School in Watsonville California, Established in 1892

== 1893 ==
- Bakersfield High School is founded as Kern County Union High School.
- Santa Maria High School in Santa Maria is founded. It is the second-oldest high school functioning on its original site.
- Fullerton Union High School 2nd oldest High School in Orange County.
- Elk Grove High School is founded as Elk Grove Union High School and is the first school in the EGUSD school district.
- The Harker School is founded as Manzanita Hall, a college preparatory school for boys and feeder for Stanford University.
- Fallbrook High School, thought to be the second high school in San Diego County.

== 1894 ==
- Madera High School is founded.
- Escondido High School, in the County of San Diego, City of Escondido is founded.
- Newport Elementary School, in Newport Beach, California, was opened.

== 1895 ==
- Long Beach Polytechnic High School is founded. Its original name was "Long Beach High School."
- Sequoia High School is founded as a preparatory school for Stanford University.

== 1901 ==
- California Polytechnic State University is founded on March 8, 1901. Its original name was "California Polytechnic School".

== See also ==
- List of the oldest public high schools in the United States
- List of colleges and universities in California
- List of high schools in California
- List of school districts in California
