= Saint Clare Parish =

Coordinates: 37°20′54″N 121°56′35″W

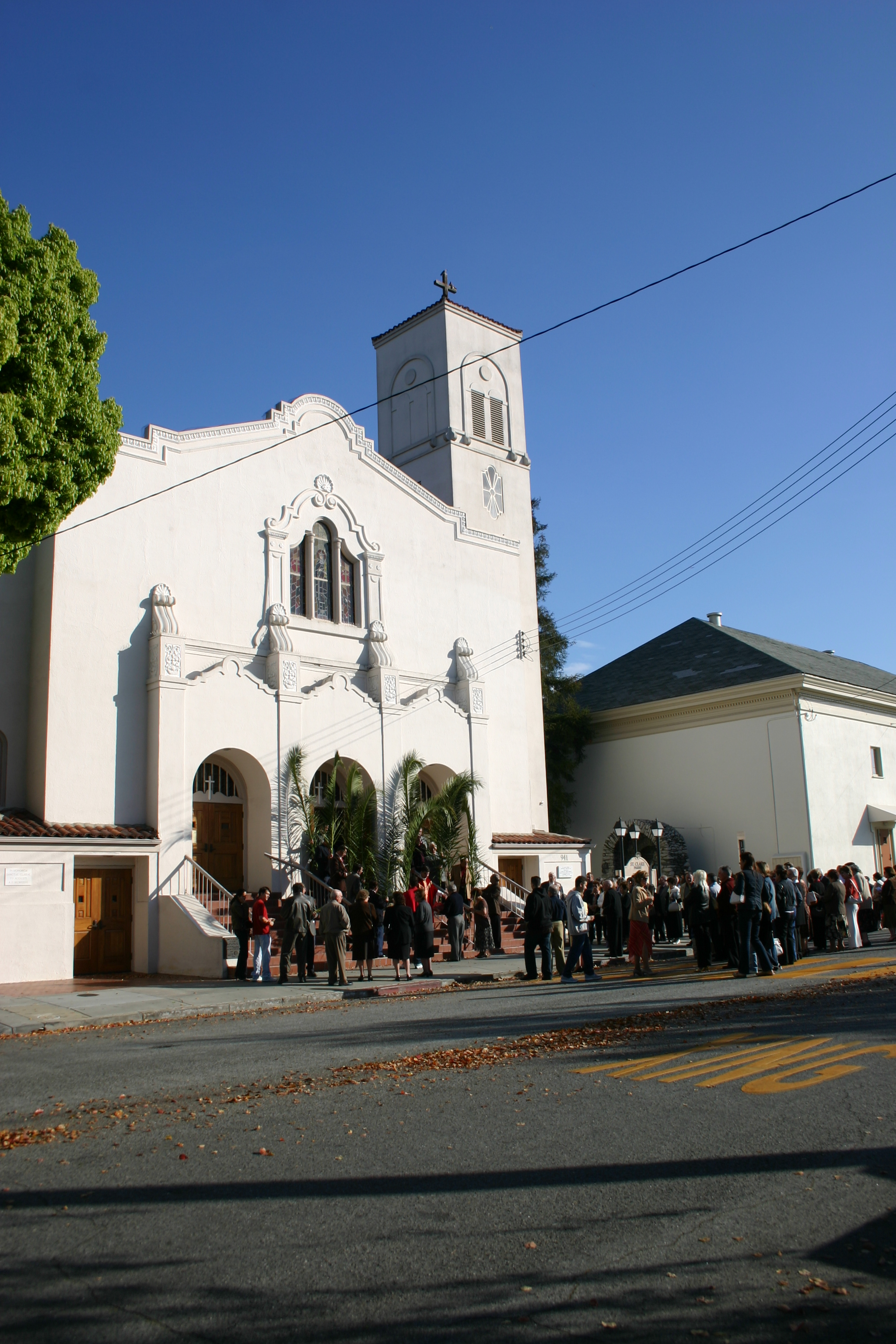
St. Clare's Parish and St. Clare Hall

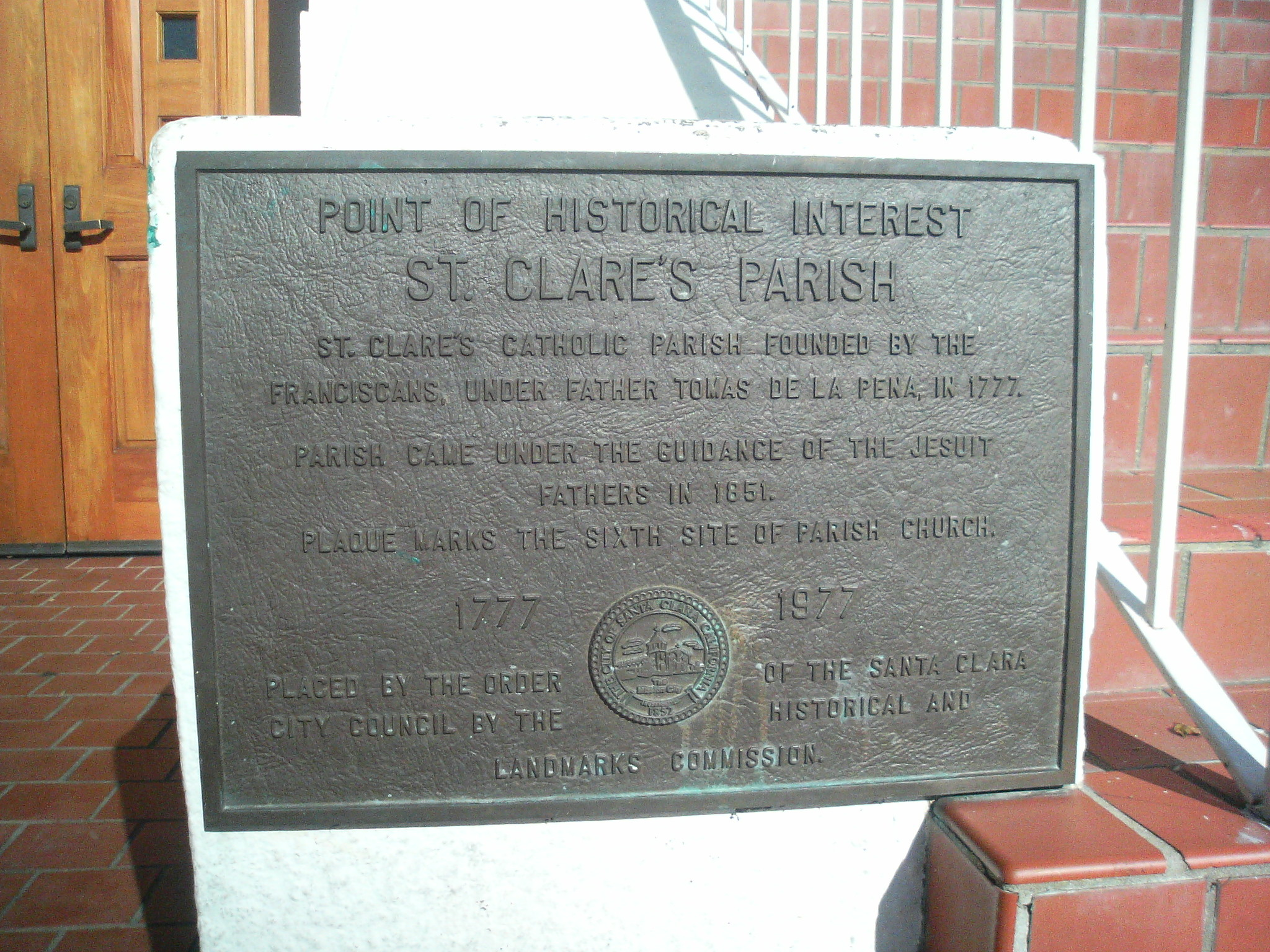
St. Clare's Parish Historical Marker

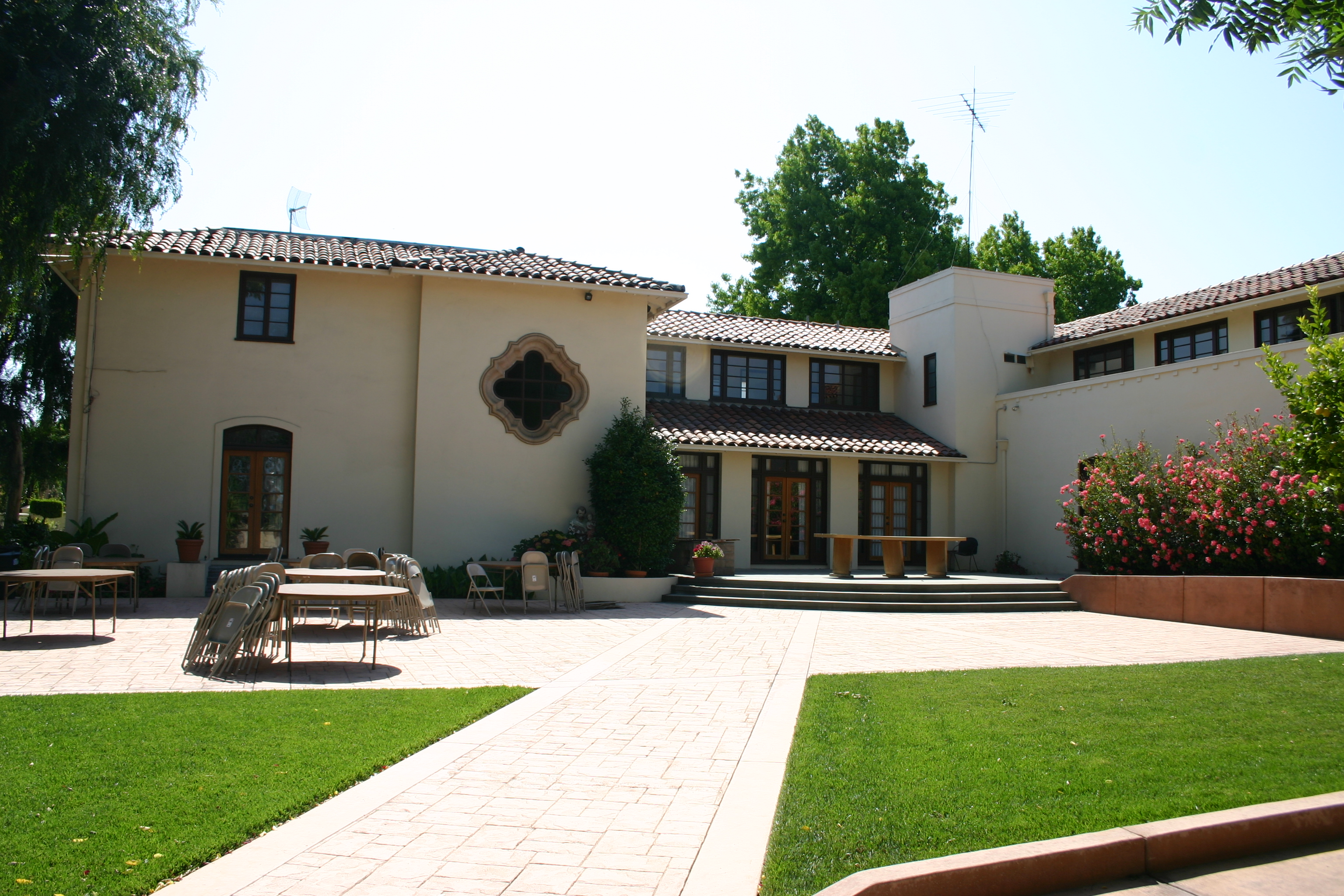
St. Clare's Rectory, 725 Washington Street Santa Clara, CA 95050

Saint Clare Parish is a parish in the Roman Catholic Diocese of San Jose in California. It is located in Santa Clara, California.

The parish community of St. Clare originated from the Mission Santa Clara de Asís and can trace its history to January 12, 1777, when Fathers Tomas de la Pena and Jose Antonio de Murguia celebrated Mass on the west bank of Santa Clara's Guadalupe River.

St. Clare Parish was built to take over the parochial functions of the Mission Santa Clara de Asís after it burned in 1925. The parish was built later that same year one block west of the mission on Lexington Street.

Archbishop Edward Hanna constituted the mission for non-parochial services for college students and the parochial powers of the church pass to St. Clare's Church built by Father George Bulter.

Father Bulter ordered a statue of the Blessed Mother from Rome. It was dedicated along with the church in a ceremony where parishioners gathered in front of the mission and carried the statue in a procession across the street to the new St Clare church on August 15, 1926 (four days after the feast day of St. Clare).

The mission was rebuilt in 1928 and is now used as the chapel for the Santa Clara University.

The parish also assumed control of the Saint Clare School located next door and founded in 1856.

St. Clare's church celebrated its 200th anniversary on Sunday, April 17, 1977, with a 12:15 pm mass officiated by Archbishop Joseph McGucken and a reception dinner and dancing at Santa Clara's Benson Center.

Santa Clara City Historical and Landmarks Commission plaque outside the steps of St. Clare Parish contains the following text:

"Point of historical interest. St. Clare's Parish. St. Clare's Catholic Parish founded by the Franciscans under Father Tomas De La Pena, in 1777. Parish came under the guidance of the Jesuit Fathers in 1851. Plaque marks the sixth site of parish church. 1777-1977. Placed by the order of the Santa Clara City Council by the Historical and Landmarks Commission."

== See also ==
- Roman Catholic Diocese of San Jose in California
