= Saint Clare School =

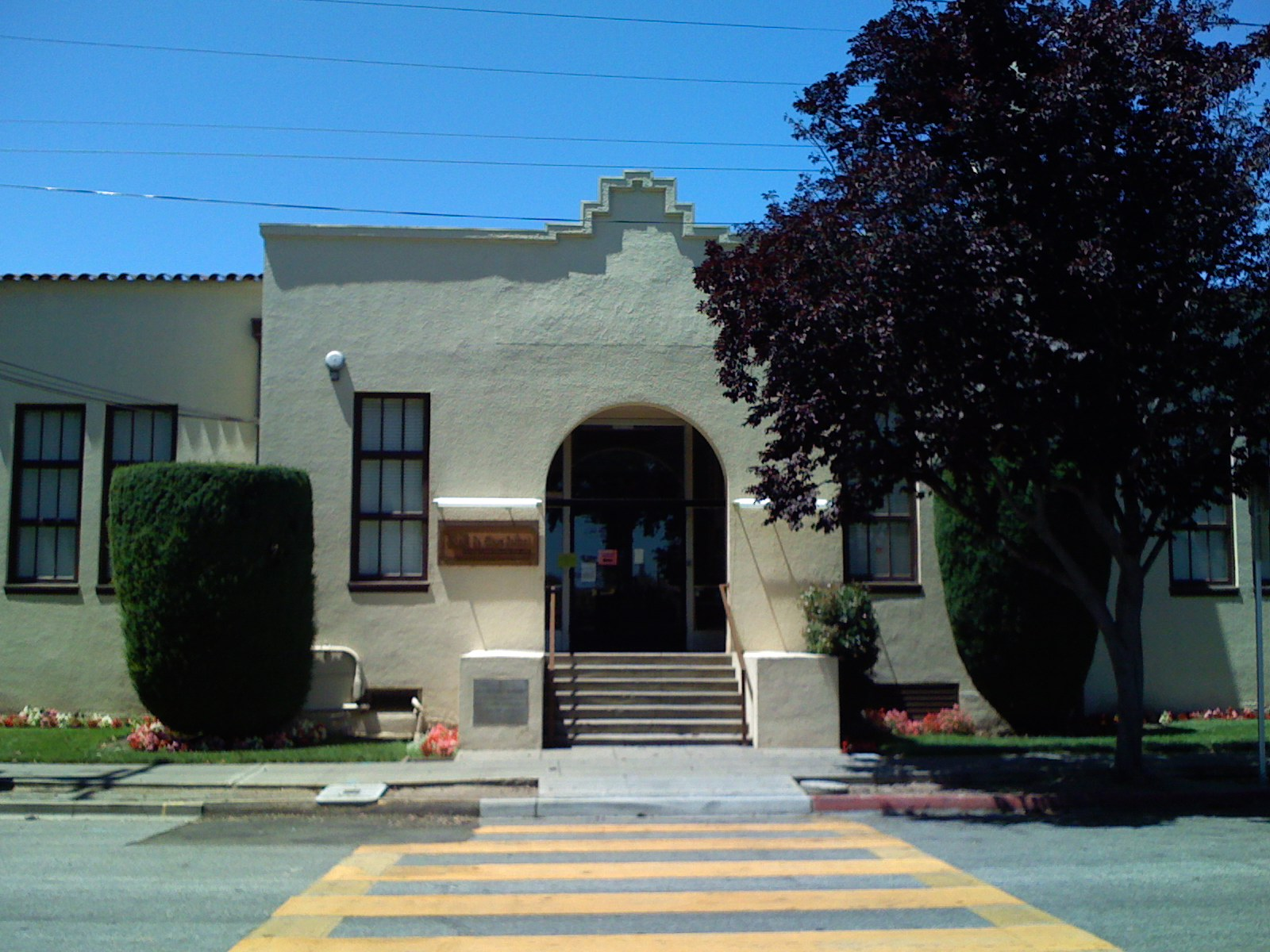

Location
- 750 Washington Street; Santa Clara, California 95050; United States

Information
- Type: Private
- Religious affiliation: Catholic
- Established: 1856
- Principal: John Ravizza
- Grades: TK–8
- Gender: Coeducational
- Enrollment: 244 students
- Color: Blue
- Mascot: Wildcats
- Team name: Wildcats
- Accreditation: ACS WASC, WCEA
- Website: www.stclare.school

Saint Clare School is a Roman Catholic elementary school operated by Saint Clare Parish in Santa Clara, California, in the United States. Founded in 1856, it is the second oldest continuously operating elementary school in California and serves families of the Diocese of San Jose.

Saint Clare School was founded in 1856 by the Sisters of Notre Dame de Namur and is located adjacent to Santa Clara University (formerly Santa Clara College).

== History ==
In 1856 the Sisters of Notre Dame de Namur who came to create one of the earliest school systems in California founded St. Mary's School to educate elementary age students in the parish. It was located next to Mission Santa Clara and the recently built Santa Clara College (1851) founded by the Jesuits. St. Mary's was later renamed Notre Dame Academy. The school started in the Forbes house located on the city block bordered by Lexington St, Santa Clara St, Lafayette St. and Washington St. The sisters also founded the College of Notre Dame, which split to become the present-day Notre Dame High School and Notre Dame de Namur University. Notre Dame High School is the sister school of the Jesuit-run boys' school Santa Clara Prep, now known as Bellarmine College Preparatory.

In 1924 Saint Clare moved across the street into a brand new school building that housed Kindergarten through eighth grade. A Marble Plaque on the front of the school proclaims "DEO OPTIMO MAXIMO IN HONREM SANCTAE CLARAE XXI OCTOBRIS A.D. MCMXXIV DEDICATA" which translates to "To the greatest and best God in honor of St. Clare. Dedicated October 21st, 1924." The following year Saint Clare Parish is built on the site of the original brick school next to Sodality Hall (later renamed St Clare Hall). Unfortunately, a fire in 1926 destroyed the original 96-year-old Mission Santa Clara.

The school continued to grow and was in dire need of space. In 1952 school raised $138,000 to build a new convent for the teaching sisters located across from the school at 725 Washington Street in Santa Clara, freeing up more classroom space. This building is now the St. Clare Parish Offices. As the enrollment demand increased at Saint Clare, the Roman Catholic Archdiocese of San Francisco authorized the opening of nearby St. Martin School in 1955 and St. Justin School in 1958. On August 7, 1958 a new building for the junior high school was built across Washington street from the school, next door to the St. Clare convent.

After more than 150 years of ministry, the Sisters transferred control of the school to lay leadership staff in 1998.
