= VaccinateCA =

- Available in: English, Spanish, Tagalog, Traditional Chinese, Simplified Chinese, Korean
- Website: www.vaccinateca.com
- Commercial: No
- Launched: January 14, 2021

VaccinateCA was a community-run website that tracked the availability of COVID-19 vaccines in California. It was created by a group of volunteers who called hospitals, pharmacies, and other health care providers daily to gather information about vaccine availability, eligibility, and appointment procedures. The website then published this information and allowed users to search for vaccination sites by region, county, or within a set radius of their ZIP code.
