= Spanish bilingual education in California =

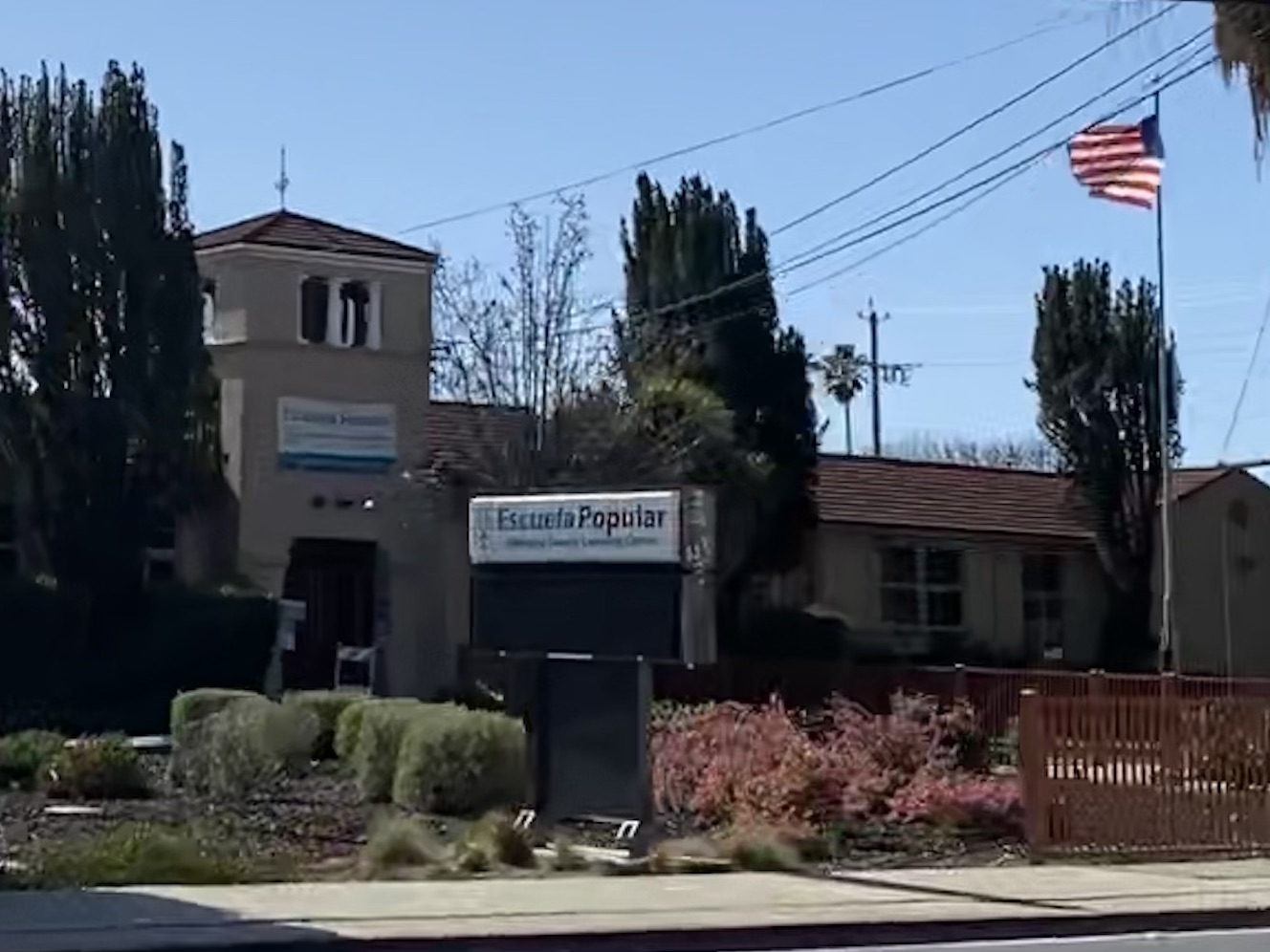
Escuela Popular, a Spanish–English dual immersion school in San Jose

Spanish bilingual education in California is the incorporation of the Spanish and English language to teach various subjects in primary education. Proposition 227 affected Spanish bilingual programs negatively by mandating that instruction be conducted "overwhelmingly in English." Although there was no direct statement in this proposition prohibiting the use of Spanish for instruction, many teachers and districts stopped teaching in the Spanish language because they were pressured to focus on English-only curriculum. However, there continue to be dual language bilingual programs in the state.

== History ==
California has a history of diversity in linguistics due to its history and roots from Mexico and Spain. In 1960 the state of California passed a state legislation that changed bilingual education in the state. This legislation kept teachers from teaching both in Spanish and English equally. In 1998 proposition 227 was enacted in the state of California which resulted in the near elimination of bilingual education programs in California. Although teachers were still allowed to incorporate the Spanish language in their teachings, they were required to have majority of their teachings be in the English language.

== English language learners (ELL) ==
California has about 1.5 million students enrolled in public schools and roughly one in four students is an English language learner. Many of the English language learners are not meeting the English language proficiency level therefore being considered long-term English learners. A long-term English learner is a student in grades six through twelve who has been stuck at the same level of English proficiency for more than two years. The needs of English language learners are slightly different compared to those students who do not have a language barrier.

== Bilingual teachers ==
Teachers play an important role in the lives of students who are learning English as their second language. Moreover, bilingual teachers are essential in the success of these students. When teachers discover that their students are part of the group that is "stuck" as long-term English learners they become "fired up" and seek methods to help these students comprehend the English language. Bilingual teachers have spoken up about the outcome that proposition 227 brought upon Spanish-speaking students. Bilingual teachers have sought to creative methods that allow their English-learning students to be able to comprehend the material as their English-speaking colleagues.

== See also ==
- Spanish language in California
