= Orchard Elementary School District =

School district in California, US

Address
- 921 Fox Lane San Jose, California, 95131; United States

District information
- Type: Public
- Grades: K–8
- NCES District ID: 0628680

Students and staff
- Students: 815 (2020–2021)
- Teachers: 43.0 (FTE)
- Staff: 30.82 (FTE)
- Student–teacher ratio: 18.95:1

Other information
- Website: www.orchardsd.org

Orchard School District is an elementary and middle public school district consisting of about 1000+ students in one school, located in northeast San Jose, California. It is a school that enrolls students from kindergarten to 8th grade. There are many different classes and sports for students to take part in. Orchard elementary school was founded on May 19, 1856. there are 4 sports. Soccer, basketball, crosscountry, and flag football. these sports can only be played if a student maintains a 2.0 gpa, has no referral(teachers or staff can give these to students for bad behavior), and must be in middle school. Orchard school contains a gym/auditorium, a cafeteria, park, grass field, office, basketball court, many classrooms. students are provided computers, lunch and breakfast, and are allowed a recess and lunch.
