= Pioneer Union Elementary School District (Kings County, California) =

School district in California

Address
- 1888 N. Mustang Dr. Hanford, California, 93230; United States

District information
- Type: Public
- Motto: A Learning Community Dedicated to Excellence
- Grades: K–8
- Established: 1870
- Superintendent: Paul van Loon
- NCES District ID: 0630510

Students and staff
- Students: 1,540 (2020–2021)
- Teachers: 62.0 (FTE)
- Staff: 70.28 (FTE)
- Student–teacher ratio: 24.84:1

Other information
- Website: www.puesd.net

Pioneer Union Elementary School District is a public school district in Hanford, California, United States.

== History ==
The Pioneer district is one of the oldest in the area. According to records at the Hanford Carnegie Museum, Pioneer School was started on Aug. 5, 1870. Back then, it was a two-story building with a belfry. Pioneer originally served the rural area of Grangeville, but now serves from the edge of Lemoore to Hanford.

== Schools ==
- Frontier Elementary School
- Pioneer Elementary School
- Pioneer Middle School
