= Jo-Ida Hansen =

Counseling psychologist

- Occupation: Professor of Psychology
- Awards: Leona Tyler Award for Lifetime Achievement in Counseling Psychology (1996); Society of Vocational Psychology Distinguished Achievement Award (2008)

Academic background
- Education: University of Minnesota

Academic work
- Discipline: Counseling Psychology
- Institutions: University of Minnesota
- Main interests: Vocational psychology and career development

Jo-Ida C. Hansen is a counseling psychologist known for her research on career and work planning and measurement of vocational interests. She is Professor Emerita of Psychology at the University of Minnesota. She is a Fellow of the American Psychological Association, the American Psychological Society, the American Counseling Association, and the American Association of Applied and Preventive Psychology

Hansen received the Leona Tyler Award for Lifetime Achievement in Counseling Psychology in 1996. She received the Distinguished Achievement Award from the Society for Vocational Psychology in 2008. She received the Minnesota Psychological Association Graduate Education Faculty Award in 2011. She received the SCP Elder Recognition Award from the Society of Counseling Psychology in 2015.

Hansen served as President of the American Psychological Association, Division 17 (Counseling Psychology) in 1994. She co-edited The Oxford Handbook of Counseling Psychology and the APA Handbook of Testing and Assessment in Psychology.

== Biography ==
Hansen attended the University of Minnesota where she completed a B.A. in 1969, a M.A. in 1971, and a PhD in psychology in 1974.

Hansen received the E. K. Strong, Jr. Gold Medal Award in 1983 to honor her research contributions in the measurement of vocational interests, and the Exemplary Practices Award of the Association for Measurement and Evaluation in Counseling and Development in 1986 and 1990. Hansen also received the Extended Research Award of the American Association of Counseling and Development in 1990 and American Counseling Association Research Award (with Sharon Sackett) in 1996.

Prior to her retirement, Hansen was a member of the faculty in the area of Counseling Psychology at the University of Minnesota, where she served as Director of the Center for Interest Measurement Research. Hansen was an early advocate for the discipline of counseling psychology and served as editor of the Journal of Counseling Psychology. She emphasized "...[ ] counseling psychology was one of the first areas within applied psychology to devote attention to issues of diversity, social action, and justice; this tradition continues with diversity broadly defined." Hansen was involved in developing a long-standing partnership between the University of Minnesota's Vocational Assessment Clinic and a Neighborhood Involvement Program that provided mental health programs for the uninsured.

== Research ==
Hansen's research explored vocational interests in relation to gender, cultural background, and personality with the goal of using the information to help people make career decisions. In graduate school, she worked with Charles Johansson in exploring vocational interests in relation to personality characteristics, such as dogmatism (i.e., rigid certainty about the correctness of one's views). In an early study (involving men only), high dogmatism was associated with interests in military, business, and management-related occupations while low dogmatism was associated with interest in arts.

Hansen was involved in updating the Strong Interest Inventory, originally developed by Edward Kellog Strong Jr., as an assessment of vocational interests. The Strong Interest Inventory has been widely used to identify people's preferred activities as a means of helping them to find suitable careers. Originally called the Strong Vocational Interest Blank, the inventory had separate forms for men and women. In 1974, Hansen was part of the team that published a new version (called the Strong-Campbell Interest Inventory) that combined the men's and women's inventories into a single form. With David P. Campbell and others, Hansen wrote the manual, user's guide, and applications and technical guide for the revised Strong Interest Inventory.

Early in her career, Hansen aimed to relate John Holland's vocational model, which delineated six occupational themes (known as Holland codes), to women's responses on the Strong Interest Inventory. Notably, Hansen and her colleagues observed gender differences in the structure of interests using Holland's scheme, even when male and female participants were matched in occupational titles – suggesting that the theoretical model may need some adjustments to better account for women's behavior. Hansen's later work confirmed the stability of the observed gender differences in interests using data conducted over a span of decades.

Hansen collaborated with Thomas J. Bouchard and others on research exploring the vocational interests of twins, including some who had been reared apart due to adoption. This study aimed to estimate genetic and environmental effects on responses to the Strong Interest Inventory.

== Representative Publications ==
- Hansen, J. I. C. (1987). Cross-cultural research on vocational interests. Measurement and Evaluation in Counseling and Development, 19(4), 163–176.
- Hansen, J. I. C. (1988). Changing interests of women: Myth or reality? Applied Psychology, 37(2), 133–150.
- Hansen, J. I. C., Collins, R. C., Swanson, J. L., & Fouad, N. A. (1993). Gender differences in the structure of interests. Journal of Vocational Behavior, 42(2), 200–211.
- Hansen, J. I. C., & Leuty, M. E. (2012). Work values across generations. Journal of Career Assessment, 20(1), 34–52.
- Hansen, J. I. C., & Swanson, J. L. (1983). Stability of interests and the predictive and concurrent validity of the 1981 Strong-Campbell Interest Inventory for college majors. Journal of Counseling Psychology, 30(2), 194–201.
