= Career assessment =

Tool for making career decisions

Career assessments is a process using psychometric tools that are designed to help individuals understand how a variety of personal attributes (eg. occupational interests, personality, motivations, aptitudes and skills), impact their potential success and satisfaction with different career options and work environments. Career assessments have played a critical role in career development and the economy in the 20th century (Whiston and Rahardja, 2005). Individuals and organizations often use assessment of some or all of these attributes, such as university career service centers, career counselors, outplacement companies, corporate human resources staff, executive coaches, vocational rehabilitation counselors, and guidance counselors to help individuals make more informed career decisions.

In part, the popularity of this tool in the United States is due to the National Defense Education Act of 1958, which funded career guidance in schools. Focus was put onto tools that would help high school students determine which subjects they may want to focus on to reach a chosen career path. Since 1958, career assessment tool options have exploded.

== Types of career assessments ==
Career assessments come in many forms and vary along several dimensions. The assessments selected by individuals or administrators vary depending on their personal beliefs regarding the most important criteria when considering career choices, as well as the unique needs of the individual considering a career decision. Some common points of variance are:

- Methodology - some assessments are quantitative in nature and precisely measure key attributes believed to influence an individual's potential success and satisfaction with a career. Others are qualitative exercises designed to help individuals clarify their goals and preferences, which can then be used to make more informed career decisions.
- Measured attributes - assessments vary with regard to the specific personality attributes measured. Some assessments focus on an individual's interests, and perhaps aptitude, while others focus on skills or values. More robust assessments use key development indicators (KDIs) that define measurements for specific types of careers and match individual career aspirations with the needs of companies.
- Target customer profile - some assessments, such as the Strong Interest Inventory, the Myers Briggs Type Indicator, and Careerscope are designed to serve broad markets (i.e., virtually any individual choosing a vocational program or Career Clusters, starting their career or considering a career change. However, it is vital to note that these tests lack well-established reliability (replicability) and validity (usefulness). Given that tests or assessment tools have been shown to have limited validity and reliability, the American Psychological Association's ethics code indicates that psychologists using those tests clearly explain the limitations of the tests to their patients.
- Career assessment interview - a career assessment interview with a trained career counselor or a psychologist who is trained in career counseling can be crucial in helping to integrate tests results into the broader context of the individual's passions, personality, culture and goals. For those interested in this sort of more comprehensive help with their career search a good starting point can be to contact the National Career Development Association (NCDA). Within the United States, this national body awards the designation, "Master Career Counselor" (MCC) to specially qualified career counselors.

== Benefits ==
Career assessments are designed to discover the skills, aptitude and talents of candidates. A self-assessment can be a useful tool in assessing the areas in which a candidate has strengths and limitations. The results can be useful in helping candidates to choose a career that is in tune with their goals and talents. While the validation of each instrument may vary from test to test, overall these types of assessments have been proven to introduce more career options, increase satisfaction in one's career plan and increase the understanding of oneself (Prince et al., 2003).

Data as to how often people change careers are unavailable while there's a considerable mythology about it, no systematic studies have been undertaken. However, many people change careers more than once. Some make changes because the career path they chose is no longer viable (to wit, buggy whip makers are no longer in high demand). Or because as they mature throughout their lifespan their interests evolve. The biggest benefit of career assessment, therefore, is that it enables candidates to make the best career decisions to grow both personally and professionally.

To make an assessment of their skills, candidates can pursue many avenues, they can take career interest tests such as the Strong Interest Inventory or the Campbell Interest and Skill inventory, which is based on the Strong. Alternatively, they can conduct a self-assessment; they can use the plethora of career books designed to help with this task. In fact, there are myriad helpful books, the most famous of which is, Richard Bolles, "What Color is Your Parachute." In addition, they can seek expert help from career counselors, career coaches or, when warranted, psychologists or other mental health professionals. These professionals use a variety of techniques to determine the talents of candidates. Also, career counselors, career coaches and executive coaches can guide candidates on how to go about planning their career to achieve professional success.

== Psychoanalytically-Informed Career Assessment ==
People who are unhappy in their work-life may be uncertain as to where to turn for help. They may have seen career counselors or career coaches or read self-help books and found that their difficulties did not yield to these interventions.

Individuals may be stymied in their careers not only because they lacked career development and job hunting skills but also because they were driven by unconscious factors outside of their awareness.

Psychoanalytically-Informed Career Assessment (also referred to as psychodynamic career assessment), developed in 2000 by Dr. Lynn Friedman, aims to understand the unconscious factors that create conflicts and to identify ways to resolve these conflicts.

Focused on individuals who seek career counseling, but end up undermining the process, Psychoanalytically-Informed Career Assessment explores whether the conflicts seen in their careers or career counseling sessions are repeated elsewhere in their lives, for example in school, or with their parents.

Interventions for these individuals might include one or all of the following: career counseling, psychotherapy or psychoanalysis.

== Drawbacks ==
Career assessment, in the form of tests and other structured and unstructured tools, can be very useful for those who are uncertain about the array of career possibilities. However, there are some drawbacks to each. At best, the results of individual career assessments provide targeted information that may not address a particular individual's needs. In addition, some of the best individual assessment tools require the help of a qualified professional to ensure the results are interpreted correctly and usefully.

Also, many of the tests are based on the person's view of himself or herself. If someone is not self-aware, the results may not be accurate. Many times they do not take into account that people have natural blind spots. The test is only as good as its user and individuals are often not clearly aware of their own strengths and weaknesses.

== See also ==
- Career
- Career development
- Holland Codes
- 16PF
- Myers-Briggs Type Indicator
- Occupational Outlook Handbook
- Personality psychology
- Standard Occupational Classification System
- Enneagram of Personality
- Career scope
