= Smaller learning communities =

Smaller learning communities may refer to:

- House system - a school system in the United Kingdom where students are divided into "houses"
- Smaller Learning Community - a US based school organizational model that is used to divide schools into smaller groups of students and teachers
