= Career Guide to Industries =

Economics publication

- Author: United States Department of Labor
- Language: English
- Subject: Career guidance
- Published: biennially through 2010
- Publication place: U.S.
- Media type: Print
- Pages: 334 (2010 ed.)
- ISBN: 978-1598045550 (2010 ed.)

The Career Guide to Industries was a publication of the United States Department of Labor's Bureau of Labor Statistics that included information about the nature of the industry, working conditions, training and education, earnings, and job outlook for workers in dozens of different industries. The Career Guide was released biennially with its companion publication the Occupational Outlook Handbook.

It is no longer an independent product and similar information is to be found in other publications, in particular: information about current and projected occupational employment within industries and information about current and projected industry employment for occupations.

The 2006-07 edition was released in December 2005 and included employment projections for the period 2004–2014. The 2010-11 edition printed by Claitors Publishing Division was released in August 2010.
