= Strong Interest Inventory =

Questionnaire to help people choose a career path

The Strong Interest Inventory (SII) is an interest inventory used in career assessment. As such, career assessments may be used in career counseling. The goal of this assessment is to give insight into a person's interests, so that they may have less difficulty in deciding on an appropriate career choice for themselves. It is also frequently used for educational guidance as one of the most popular career assessment tools. The test was developed in 1927 by psychologist Edward Kellog Strong Jr. to help people exiting the military find suitable jobs. It was revised later by Jo-Ida Hansen and David P. Campbell. The modern version of 2004 is based on the Holland Codes typology of psychologist John L. Holland. The Strong is designed for high school students, college students, and adults, and was found to be at about the ninth-grade reading level.

== Background and history ==
Before he created the inventory, Strong was the head of the Bureau of Educational Research at the Carnegie Institute of Technology. Strong attended a seminar at the Carnegie Institute of Technology where a man by the name of Clarence S. Yoakum introduced the use of questionnaires in differentiating between people of various occupations. This later sparked Strong's interest in developing a better way of measuring people's occupational interests. Starting off as the "Strong Vocational Interest Blank", the name changed when the test was revised in 1974 to the Strong-Campbell Interest Inventory and later to the Strong Interest Inventory. The inventory has been revised six times over the years to reflect continued development in the field.

Strong based his empirical approach on the idea that interests were on a dimension of liking to disliking that could be used to discriminate among various occupational groups. In other words, Strong developed several scales that contrasted groups of people, based on their answers. This method of scaling, developed by Strong, has been very influential and has been used in several different questionnaires, including the Minnesota Multiphasic Personality Inventory (MMPI).

Strong's original Inventory had 10 occupational scales. The original Inventory was created with men in mind, so in 1933 Strong came out with a women's form of the Strong Vocational Blank. In 1974 when the Strong-Campbell Interest Inventory came out, Campbell had combined both the men's and the women's forms into a single form. Other improvements that Campbell made to earlier versions include: the use of 124 occupational scales, the continued use of 23 Basic Interest Scales, and the addition of 2 special scales to measure academic comfort and introversion/extroversion dimensions.

The Strong Interest Inventory is high in both predictive and concurrent validity.

== Components ==
The newly revised inventory consists of 291 items that measure an individual's interest in six areas:

Area	Number of Questions in Each Area
Occupations	107
Subject Areas	46
Activities	85
Leisure Activities	28
People	16
Your Characteristics	9

The first 282 items are answered by the examinee choosing one of the following options: "strongly like", "like", "indifferent", "dislike", or "strongly dislike" while the remaining 9 items in the "Your Characteristics" section are answered the same way but with different options including: "strongly like me", "like me", "don't know", "unlike me", or "strongly unlike me". It is an assessment of interests, and not to be confused with personality assessments or aptitude test.

== Scoring ==
The newly revised version of this test can typically be taken in 30–45 minutes after which the results must be scored by computer. After scoring, an individual can then view how their personal interests compare with the interests of people in a specific career field. Access to the comparison database and interpretation of the results usually incurs a fee.

Strong Interest Inventory is a registered trademark of The Myers-Briggs Company, or CPP, Inc. of Mountain View, California.

The results include:

- Scores on the level of interest on each of the six Holland Codes or General Occupational Themes (GOTs).
  - The six GOTs include: Realistic, Investigative, Artistic, Social, Enterprising, and Conventional (RIASEC).
- Scores on 30 Basic Interest Scales (e.g. art, science, and public speaking)
- Scores on 244 Occupational Scales which indicate the similarity between the respondent's interests and those of people working in each of the 122 occupations.
- Scores on 5 Personal Style Scales (learning, working, leadership, risk-taking and team orientation).
- Scores on 3 Administrative Scales used to identify test errors or unusual profiles.

== Interpretation ==
When an individual takes and completes the assessment, the resulting data is reflected by scores in each of the six General Occupational Themes (GOTs) or interest areas, including Realistic, Investigative, Artistic, Social, Enterprising, and Conventional (RIASEC). Typically, a Theme Code that reflects the top three RIASEC interest areas is reported. For some individuals, however, only one or two RIASEC interest areas may be reported, this being the case if their scores in the five remaining interest areas are not considered high enough or significant enough to be identified as major interest areas.

The RIASEC GOT interest area results for any particular individual can be correlated or not correlated, differentiated or undifferentiated. As an example, in his 1998 case study of Ms. Flood, Jeffrey R. Prince reported in the Career Development Quarterly, 46, "Environments that are purely Artistic usually reflect values of independence and self-expression through loosely structured activities, whereas Enterprising environments frequently include organizational structures that value status." Ms. Flood's RIASEC results reflected that her main GOT occupational theme code was AE, with S as a possible third theme code, but at a lower intensity. In this case, and according to Holland's RIASEC Hexagon, these theme codes may not be entirely congruent, correlated, or undifferentiated with Ms. Flood's interests. Theme codes that fall closer in proximity to each other on Holland's RIASEC hexagon are those that generally reflect greater congruence, correlation, and undifferentiation. Therefore, Ms. Flood may experience some psychological challenges in trying to integrate her interests related the Artistic and Enterprising theme codes into her work because those interest areas are not considered to be highly correlated. Ms. Flood would benefit from working in careers and occupations that support her main GOTs of Artistic and Enterprising, with some Social component.

== Reception ==
Jan Case from Louisiana State University Health Sciences Center and Terry L. Blackwell from Montana State University-Billings did a study in 2008, published in Rehabilitation Counseling Bulletin, 51. It came to favorable conclusions about the inventory:

The Strong Interest Inventory's qualitative features (including the design of the test booklets, quality and clarity of its contents, durability, appropriateness for the test-takers, and supportive interpretation materials) and its psychometric characteristics continue to distinguish this instrument as a standard of excellence ... the Strong continues to set the standard for vocational interest inventories. It has proven reliability and validity properties. Furthermore, the developers have continued to strive for improvements and innovations in this inventory. Career counselors, psychologists, and others using the Strong will find they have an instrument that is methodologically sophisticated and that will provide clients with much information to ponder along with the resources with which make reasoned career decisions.

Many of the jobs that the Strong Interest Inventory predicted did not exist prior to the latest version. Because of this fact, the test is constantly being updated as new jobs are created and technology advances.

== See also ==
- Career development
- Holland Codes
