= Career Clusters =

Career Clusters provide students with a context for studying traditional academics and learning the skills specific to a career, and provide U.S. schools with a structure for organizing or restructuring curriculum offerings and focusing class make-up by a common theme such as interest.

In the U.S. Department of Education model, 17 Career Clusters link to 70+ more specific Career Pathways – each have their own knowledge and skills requirements. Within the 70+ career pathways, 1800 Career Specialties are defined. The structure has evolved over time and may vary by state. The U.S. DOE Career Clusters framework is useful for connecting students with courses of study and careers via Career Assessments, and allows them to learn general, more transferable skills at the cluster level, with more specific skills and knowledge acquired at the career pathways and specialty levels. The nonprofit Vocational Research Institute adapted an interest and aptitude assessment, Careerscope, to help students choose curriculum and careers for which they have both interest and aptitude - at the cluster, pathway and career specialty levels. A concept related to Career Clusters, Small Learning Community is primarily concerned with restructuring secondary schools, in many cases using a career clusters framework.

== Background ==
The Career Cluster initiative began in 1996 in the U.S. as the Building Linkages Initiative and was a collaborative effort between the U.S. Department of Education, the Office of Vocational and Adult Education (OVAE), the National School-to-Work Office (NSTWO) and the National Skill Standards Board (NSSB). The purpose of the Initiative was to establish linkages among State educational agencies, secondary and post-secondary educational institutions, employers, industry groups, other stakeholders and Federal agencies. The goal was to create curricular frameworks in broad career clusters, designed to prepare students to transition successfully from high school to post-secondary education and employment in a career area.

The creation of curricular models within the context of broad career clusters ensures the alignment of academic and technical instructional strategies with the requirements of post-secondary education and the expectations of employers in increasingly academic and technologically demanding careers. The vocational education field has historically responded to the needs of the national economy by preparing individuals for in-demand jobs.

== See also ==
- The Academy of Irving ISD
- Career Development
- Career Assessments
- Careerscope Assessment for Career Clusters
