= Community manager =

Community manager may refer to:

- Community association manager, a person who manages a condominium or homeowners association
- Online community manager, a person who manages an online community

== See also ==
- Community management
