= Narrative career counseling =

Approach to career counselling emphasising stories, meaning-making, and agency

Narrative career counselling is an approach to career counselling that uses stories and narratives as central means through which people make sense of work, learning, identity, transitions, and future possibilities. It is commonly associated with constructivist, social constructionist, and postmodern perspectives in career development and counselling. Rather than treating career decisions primarily as a matter of matching personal traits with occupational information, narrative career counselling emphasises subjectivity, meaning-making, reflection, contextual influences, and the client’s active role in authoring career-related stories.

The term does not refer to a single manualised intervention. It is used as an umbrella term for a range of approaches that draw on narrative, constructivist, contextual, systemic, and dialogical ideas, including the storied approach, the story telling approach, SocioDynamic career counselling, career construction counselling, life design, contextual action theory, and chaos-informed approaches. Across these variations, the counsellor is typically positioned as a collaborative, curious, and tentative facilitator of storytelling rather than as an expert who diagnoses the client and prescribes an occupational solution.

== Background and development ==
Career counselling developed from early forms of vocational guidance, particularly the trait-and-factor and person–environment fit traditions associated with Frank Parsons and later matching approaches. These early models generally emphasised self-knowledge, occupational knowledge, and rational decision-making, often supported by psychometric assessment. Although these approaches remain influential, they have been criticised for giving limited attention to culture, context, power, identity, and the changing nature of work.

Narrative career counselling emerged as part of a broader “narrative turn” in psychology, counselling, and career development theory. This turn reflected growing attention to the ways people organise life experience through stories, develop narrative identities, and make meaning across changing life roles. Within the career field, narrative ideas were influenced by broader developments in constructivist counselling, social constructionist thought, narrative therapy, life design, and career construction theory.

Early texts and approaches associated with narrative career counselling include Larry Cochran’s Career Counseling: A Narrative Approach, Norman Amundson’s active engagement approach, Pamelia Brott’s storied approach, Vance Peavy’s SocioDynamic counselling, and Mark Savickas’s career construction theory and counselling.

== Theoretical foundations ==
=== Constructivism and social constructionism ===
Narrative career counselling is grounded in the view that people actively construct meaning about themselves and their worlds. Constructivist approaches tend to emphasise the individual’s active meaning-making, while social constructionist approaches emphasise the relational, cultural, linguistic, and historical processes through which meanings are co-constructed. In career counselling, these perspectives shifted attention from objective measurement alone toward the client’s lived experience, personal and social narratives, and the cultural contexts in which career identities are formed.

From this perspective, career is not only a sequence of jobs or educational choices. It is also a personally and socially meaningful story that links past experiences, present concerns, and imagined futures. Narrative approaches therefore focus on how clients interpret life events, connect different roles and experiences, identify recurring themes, and construct future-oriented stories that can guide action.

=== Narrative therapy ===
Narrative career counselling has also drawn on narrative therapy, particularly its attention to language, dominant stories, alternative stories, and the effects of social and cultural discourses on identity. Narrative therapy introduced practices such as externalising problems, deconstructing problem-saturated stories, identifying unique outcomes, and supporting people to re-author preferred accounts of identity. In career counselling, these ideas have been adapted to help clients examine how career stories are shaped by family, culture, education, migration, gender, class, disability, sexuality, labour markets, and other contextual influences.

== Key concepts ==
=== Story and narrative identity ===
In narrative career counselling, stories are treated as more than descriptions of events. They are understood as ways of organising experience, expressing identity, and making sense of career-related choices and transitions. Career stories may include accounts of work, learning, family expectations, migration, community membership, interests, values, disappointments, achievements, and imagined futures. Counselling often aims to help clients identify themes in these stories and use them to construct more coherent and meaningful future directions.

=== Subjectivity and meaning-making ===
Narrative career counselling prioritises the client’s subjective experience. It assumes that career decisions cannot be fully understood only through objective information such as test scores, labour market data, or occupational classifications. These forms of information may still be used, but they are commonly treated as prompts for exploration rather than final answers. The emphasis is on how clients interpret their experiences, what they value, how they understand constraints and possibilities, and how they can move toward preferred career actions.

=== Reflection, connectedness, learning, and agency ===
Several accounts of narrative career counselling identify reflection, connectedness, meaning-making, learning, and agency as important process constructs. Reflection refers to the client’s opportunity to examine past and present experiences. Connectedness refers to the linking of stories, roles, relationships, and systems of influence. Meaning-making involves interpreting the significance of experiences. Learning refers to new understandings generated through the counselling process. Agency refers to the client’s capacity to act in relation to preferred future possibilities.

=== Counselling relationship ===
The counselling relationship is central to narrative career counselling. The counsellor is usually described as a facilitator, listener, co-traveller, co-investigator, or curious inquirer, rather than as an expert who unilaterally interprets the client’s situation. The relationship is intended to be collaborative, respectful, and dialogical. This is especially important when working across cultural differences or with clients whose previous encounters with institutions have been experienced as hierarchical, diagnostic, or deficit-focused.

== Practice ==
=== Story crafting and questioning ===
Narrative career counselling commonly uses open-ended questions, reflective listening, mapping, scaffolding, and story-crafting strategies to support clients in telling, examining, and extending career stories. Story-crafting questions may help clients describe the current story, identify preferred or alternative stories, explore social and cultural influences, and imagine future actions. The process may involve moving from a present story toward a desired future story, while attending to the client’s values, relationships, skills, hopes, constraints, and contexts.

=== Qualitative career assessment ===
Narrative approaches often use qualitative career assessment rather than, or alongside, psychometric assessment. Qualitative assessment may include lifelines, card sorts, career genograms, autobiographical writing, collages, drawings, mapping exercises, life-role circles, and reflective workbooks. These activities are intended to stimulate storytelling, reflection, and meaning-making rather than produce fixed diagnostic conclusions.

Some narrative approaches also integrate quantitative career assessment. In such cases, test results may be used as material for discussion, reflection, and story development rather than as prescriptive indicators of the client’s “correct” career path.

== Major approaches ==
=== Storied approach ===
The storied approach, developed by Pamelia Brott, is grounded in narrative constructivism and focuses on the client’s active role in constructing life stories across roles and experiences. It has been described as involving processes of co-construction, deconstruction, reconstruction, and construction, through which clients explore past and present stories and develop future chapters.

=== Story telling approach and the Systems Theory Framework ===
The story telling approach is based on the Systems Theory Framework of career development. It views career development as shaped by interacting individual, social, and environmental-societal systems. In practice, this approach attends to how clients connect experiences across life roles, relationships, contexts, and time, and how these connections can support future career stories.

=== SocioDynamic career counselling ===
SocioDynamic career counselling, associated with Vance Peavy and later developments by other practitioners, emphasises dialogue, meaning-making, life space, and the social construction of career realities. It uses collaborative conversation and visualisation practices such as mapping to help clients examine life situations and future possibilities.

=== Dialogical self and career self-research ===
Dialogical approaches draw on the idea that the self contains multiple voices, positions, and perspectives. In career counselling, this can support clients to examine different self-positions and the relationships between them. Tools such as My Career Chapter have been used to support reflective and dialogical exploration of career identity.

=== Career construction and life design ===
Career construction theory, developed by Mark Savickas, is one of the most influential narrative approaches in vocational psychology. It focuses on vocational personality, career adaptability, and life themes, with life themes providing the narrative thread through which people make sense of career choices and transitions. Career construction counselling and life design interventions commonly invite clients to tell stories about role models, favourite stories, early recollections, and life themes, which are then used to support self-authorship and future action.

=== Contextual action theory ===
Contextual action theory conceptualises career counselling as involving goal-directed human action situated in social and relational contexts. From this perspective, counselling can help clients and counsellors jointly examine actions, projects, goals, meanings, and the relational contexts in which career development occurs.

=== Chaos theory and complexity ===
Chaos-informed approaches to career counselling emphasise uncertainty, non-linearity, chance, complexity, and adaptability in contemporary career development. These approaches are compatible with narrative counselling because they encourage clients to construct flexible stories that can accommodate unpredictability and change.

=== Creative approaches ===
Creative methods in narrative career counselling include art-based, visual, spatial, and expressive practices such as drawing, sculpting, collage, mapping, and metaphor. Such practices may provide alternative ways for clients to express career stories, particularly when verbal reflection alone is insufficient or culturally limiting.

== Applications across cultures and contexts ==
Narrative career counselling is often presented as useful for culturally and contextually diverse populations because it allows clients’ own meanings, stories, and social locations to become central to the counselling process. However, scholars also caution that narrative approaches must not assume that all clients understand career, counselling, agency, or self-authorship in the same way.

=== Culture and social justice ===
Culture-infused and culturally prepared approaches emphasise the importance of locating career stories within cultural, communal, historical, and structural contexts. These approaches link narrative career counselling with social justice by encouraging practitioners to consider how opportunity, marginalisation, discrimination, and institutional structures shape career stories and possible futures.

=== Education and schools ===
In educational settings, narrative career counselling may be used to help students explore identity, learning pathways, transitions, and future possibilities. School-based applications may use creative and technological tools to engage young people in career storytelling and reduce the distance between personal identity development and educational decision-making.

=== Online counselling ===
Narrative career counselling has also been discussed in online and digitally mediated contexts. Online delivery can expand access but also raises questions about ethics, relational depth, digital literacy, privacy, and the adaptation of narrative practices to mediated communication.

=== People with refugee backgrounds ===
Narrative career counselling has been proposed as particularly relevant for people with refugee backgrounds, whose career development may be shaped by forced migration, disrupted education, loss, resettlement, racism, language barriers, and dominant social narratives that frame them primarily through trauma or deficit. Abkhezr and McMahon argue that narrative career counselling can support people with refugee backgrounds to reconnect with preferred stories of skills, knowledge, strength, and future possibility after resettlement.

Research with young people with refugee backgrounds has found that narrative storytelling can provide space for marginalised or silenced voices to re-emerge and may support the re-contextualisation of skills, strengths, knowledge, and career plans. Practice considerations include clarifying the purpose of career counselling, recognising previous experiences of institutional interviews, building trust, using cultural humility, and attending to family, community, and collectivist orientations.

=== Disability, sexuality, and vulnerability ===
Narrative career counselling has also been applied to work with people experiencing disadvantage, people with disabilities or other vulnerabilities, and lesbian, gay, bisexual, transgender, and gender-diverse persons. These applications commonly emphasise the deconstruction of oppressive or limiting social narratives and the development of preferred career stories connected to inclusion, dignity, authenticity, and sustainable life design.

== Criticism and evidence ==
Narrative career counselling has been described as appealing because of its attention to meaning, culture, context, and client agency, but it has also been criticised for limitations in its empirical evidence base and for the difficulty of clearly defining its procedures and outcomes. Some critiques suggest that narrative career counselling may be challenging for beginner practitioners because it can appear less structured than traditional assessment-based approaches. Others argue that the field needs stronger outcome research and more detailed accounts of how narrative processes operate in counselling dialogue.

Critical perspectives have also warned that narrative career counselling should pay closer attention to power, discourse, and the risk that counselling may inadvertently reproduce dominant cultural assumptions. From this perspective, narrative approaches need to balance personal agency with careful attention to structural constraints, institutional power, and the social conditions that shape career possibilities.

== Future directions ==
Recent scholarship has linked narrative career counselling with social justice, an ethic of care, sustainability, cultural responsiveness, and the need to address structural inequality in career development. Future directions include further research on counselling process and outcomes, greater attention to diverse cultural contexts, integration of qualitative and quantitative career assessment, online and technology-supported practice, and the application of narrative approaches to groups experiencing marginalisation or disrupted career development.

== See also ==
- Career counseling
- Career development
- Constructivism (philosophy of education)
- Social constructionism
- Narrative therapy
- Vocational psychology
- Life design
- Career construction theory
