= Dictionary of Occupational Titles =

Publication by the United States Department of Labor

- Author: United States Department of Labor
- Subject: Occupation descriptions
- Published: 1938–1999
- Media type: Print, Online
- ISBN: 978-1563700002 (March 1999)

The Dictionary of Occupational Titles or D-O-T (DOT) refers to a publication produced by the United States Department of Labor which helped employers, government officials, and workforce development professionals to define over 13,000 different types of work, from 1938 to the late 1990s. The DOT was created by job analysts who visited thousands of US worksites to observe and record the various types of work, and what was involved. Innovative at the time, the DOT included information still used today in settling EEO and workers' compensation claims, like the physical abilities required to perform that occupation, and the time and repetitiveness of those physical actions (i.e. standing, sitting, lifting 20 pounds or more, seeing at a distance, near vision, hearing quiet sounds, ignoring loud sounds).

The DOT was later rendered obsolete and has been replaced by a free online database based largely on voluntary input from occupation incumbents (people who have direct experience working in each occupation). The new occupational database is called the Occupational Information Network or the O*NET. The last government-published version of the D-O-T was published in March 1999 as two volumes with additional information related to the O*NET database. Copies of the DOT published after March 1999 are not originals. They are reprints by commercial publishers, several of which reprinted the book under very similar titles, taking advantage of a very limited copyright which did little to protect the title "Dictionary of Occupational Titles" and did nothing to protect most of the content of the D-O-T.

== O*NET ==
The entire O*NET database is available free of charge to the general public for job analysis and workforce planning via a searchable web-based application O*NET Online. Businesses and programmers may choose to download the latest update of the entire O*NET database for their own use through O*NET Center. The O*NET Database and related websites are updated and maintained regularly by the National Center for O*NET Development, sponsored by the US Department of Labor/Employment and Training Administration.

== History ==
The Dictionary of Occupational Titles was first published in 1938 and "emerged in an industrial economy and emphasized blue-collar jobs. Updated periodically, the DOT provided useful occupational information for many years. But its usefulness waned as the economy shifted toward an information and services and away from heavy industry." The last update to job descriptions was in 1991.

During the 1990s, the hard-copy book format of the DOT was discarded. An online database known as Occupational Information Network (O*NET) was created in 1998. O*NET classifies jobs in job families (functional areas which include workers from entry level to advanced, and may include several sub-specialties). After the third major revision of O*NET realigned all O*NET occupations to conform to the newly mandated Standard Occupational Classification (SOC), O*NET officially replaced the DOT, with less than 1,000 listed occupational categories, compared to over 13,000 occupations in the last published DOT.

== Use by the Social Security Administration ==
Although the DOT was deemed obsolete and then abandoned by the Employment Service and the Department of Labor, the data from the 1991 revised fourth edition of the Dictionary of Occupational Titles is used extensively at the Social Security Administration (SSA) in litigation related to applications for Social Security disability benefits and Supplemental Security Income (SSI) for adult claimants. For SSA disability claimants, the DOT is still used extensively for performing Transferable Skills Analysis.

In December 2008, SSA announced the formation of an Occupational Information Development Advisory Panel under the provisions of the Federal Advisory Committee Act (FACA). SSA explained: "Panel members will analyze the occupational information used by SSA in our disability programs and provide expert guidance as we develop an occupational information system (OIS) tailored for these programs. We plan to design the OIS to improve our disability policies and processes and to ensure up-to-date vocational evidence in our disability programs. We will select Panel members based primarily on their occupational expertise. This Panel will provide guidance on our plans and actions to replace the Dictionary of Occupational Titles and its companion volume, The Selected Characteristics of Occupations."

In 2012, SSA contracted with the Bureau of Labor Statistics to replace the DOT. The new database, known as the Occupational Requirements Survey, has been authorized by SSA for use in disability determinations.

The Social Security Administration determined in 2025 that some jobs in the Dictionary of Occupational Titles may "have been replaced by more modern materials or processes". If a disability adjudicator lists certain occupations as a job that a person could do, the SSA requires additional justification, including evidence that the job "exists in the national economy in numbers that alone, or in combination with work in other cited occupations, are significant." These job titles include "Document Preparer, Microfilming", "Cutter-and-Paster, Press Clippings", "Surveillance-System Monitor", "Nut Sorter", and "Microfilm Processor".

== Other uses ==
Vocational Evaluators also use DOT data when working with injured workers who seek insurance settlements and/or vocational rehabilitation services. It is also relied upon in immigration adjudication within the United States.

== See also ==
- Occupational Information Network (O*NET)
- Selected Characteristics of Occupations Defined in the Revised Dictionary of Occupational Titles
