= SVP =

SVP may refer to:

== Arts and entertainment ==
- Sega Virtua Processor, a processor added to the Sega Genesis game Virtua Racing
- Struga Poetry Evenings (Struški Večeri na Poezijata), an international poetry festival held in Struga, North Macedonia
- Sarkaru Vaari Paata, a 2022 Indian film by Parasuram

== Businesses and organisations ==
=== Politics ===
- Swiss People's Party (German: Schweizerische Volkspartei), a national-conservative party in Switzerland
- South Tyrolean People's Party (German: Südtiroler Volkspartei), a regionalist party in Italy
- Party of the Swedes (Swedish: Svenskarnas parti), a neo-Nazi party in Sweden

=== Other businesses and organisations ===
- SVP Worldwide, a sewing machine manufacturer
- Society of Saint Vincent de Paul, a Catholic voluntary charity
- Society of Vertebrate Paleontology, a society of paleontologists

== Science, technology and mathematics ==
- Sega Virtua Processor, a video game console processor
- Shortest vector problem, the problem of finding the smallest non-zero vector in a lattice space
- SmoothVideo Project, motion interpolation software
- Society of Vertebrate Paleontology, a society of paleontologists
- Soil vent pipe, in a drain-waste-vent system
- Saturated vapour pressure, the pressure exerted by a vapour in thermodynamic equilibrium with its condensed phases at a given temperature in a closed system.
- Small volume parenterals, a type of injectable pharmaceutical product

== Sport ==
- Save percentage, a goalkeeping statistic used by some sports leagues
- Scott Van Pelt (born 1966), American sportscaster (often referred to as SVP)

== Other uses ==
- Senior vice president, in the hierarchy of vice presidents
- Sexually violent predator, a US legal classification allowing commitment to a mental institution
- "S'il vous plaît", French way of saying "please"
- Specific Vocational Preparation, a measure of the time needed to learn a job in transferable skills analysis
