= CMCA =

CMCA may refer to:

== Groups, organizations, companies ==
- Center for Maine Contemporary Art
- Chinese Methodist Church in Australia
- CMCA 550 AM (radio station), San Antonio de las Vegas, Cuba
- Cheyenne Mountain Charter Academy, former name of The Vanguard School (Colorado)
- Confederacion Masonica Centroamericana, see List of Masonic Grand Lodges

== Other uses ==
- Cruise Missile Carrier Aircraft, a proposed USAF military variant of the Boeing 747
- Cmca, a crystalline configuration; see orthorhombic crystal system
- Cmca, a space group in mathematics; see List of space groups
- Certified Manager of Community Associations, a certification for community association manager
- Costa Mesa, California, a city located in California
