= Occupational Information Network =

Database of definition of occupations in the United States

The Occupational Information Network (O*NET) is a free online database that contains hundreds of job definitions to help students, job seekers, businesses and workforce development professionals to understand today's world of work in the United States. It was developed under the sponsorship of the US Department of Labor/Employment and Training Administration (USDOL/ETA) through a grant to the North Carolina Employment Security Commission (now part of the NC Commerce Department) during the 1990s. John L. Holland's vocational model, often referred to as the Holland Codes, is used in the "Interests" section of the O*NET. O*NET is continuously updated by USDOL/ETA, which updates a rotating set of occupations each year on the basis of a multi-method program of research including over 42,000 surveys, expert interviews, and the analysis of job postings. According to O*NET's Paperwork Reduction Act (PRA) notice, the total annual cost of maintaining and updating O*NET is estimated at $9.7 million.

== History ==
From 1938 to the 1990s, vocational lists and employment matching offered by the U.S. government were available through the book, The Dictionary of Occupational Titles or the DOT. The DOT was first published in 1938 and "emerged in an industrial economy and emphasized blue-collar jobs. Updated periodically, the DOT provided useful occupational information for many years, for example through the NOICC/SOICC system. But its usefulness waned as the economy shifted toward information and services and away from heavy industry." With the shift in the economy, plans developed to replace the book format of the DOT with an online database. A limited use, preliminary version was released in December 1997, followed by a public edition in December 1998. The O*NET thus, "supersedes the seventy-year-old Dictionary of Occupational Titles with current information that can be accessed online or through a variety of public and private sector career and labor market information systems." The decision to move from the DOT to O*NET, "remains controversial (e.g., Gibson, Harvey, & Harris, 2007; Harvey, 2009; Harvey & Hollander, 2002), even as we approach the 20-year anniversary of its inception (e.g., APDOT, 1992). Many applied psychologists have praised O*NET (e.g., Peterson, Mumford, Borman, Jeanneret, Fleishman, Levin, Campion, Mayfield, Morgeson, Pearlman, Gowing, Lancaster, Silver, & Dye, 2001)."

O*NET classifies jobs in job families (functional areas which include workers from entry level to advanced, and may include several sub-specialties). After the third major revision of O*NET realigned all O*NET occupations to conform to the newly mandated Standard Occupational Classification (SOC)), O*NET, with less than 1,000 listed occupational categories, compares to over 13,000 occupations in the last published DOT.

== Overview ==
The O*NET system varies from the DOT in a number of ways. It is a digital database which offers a "flexible system, allowing users to reconfigure data to meet their needs" as opposed to the "fixed format" of the DOT; it reflects the employment needs of an Information society rather than an Industrial society; costs the government and users much less than a printed book would, and is easier to update as new data is collected. The US Department of Labor/Employment and Training Administration (USDOL/ETA) describes the O*NET as: "a database of occupational requirements and worker attributes. It describes occupations in terms of the skills and knowledge required, how the work is performed, and typical work settings. It can be used by businesses, educators, job seekers, human resources professionals, and the publicly funded Workforce Investment System to help meet the talent needs of our competitive global economy. O*NET information helps support the creation of industry competency models."

For each job, O*NET provides the following information:

- Personal requirements: the skills and knowledge required to perform the work
- Personal characteristics: the abilities, interests, and values needed to perform the work
- Experience requirements: the training and level of licensing and experience needed for the work
- Job requirements: the work activities and context, including the physical, social, and organizational factors involved in the work
- Labor market: the occupational outlook and the pay scale for the work

== See also ==
- Holland Codes
