= Small Learning Community =

Type of school organizational model

A Small Learning Community (SLC), also referred to as a School-Within-A-School, is a school organizational model that is an increasingly common form of learning environment in American secondary schools to subdivide large school populations into smaller, autonomous groups of students and teachers. SLCs can also be physical learning spaces.

The primary purpose of restructuring secondary schools into SLCs is to create a more personalized learning environment to better meet the needs of students. Each community will often share the same teachers and student members from grade to grade. Teachers in these units usually have common planning time to allow them to develop interdisciplinary projects and keep up with the progress of their shared students.

== Types ==
SLCs can take several forms.

- Theme-Based Smaller Learning Communities or Focus Schools are usually formed around a specific curricular theme. Examples might include "Success Academy" or "Humanities".
- Houses may be themed or non-themed or separated by grade levels.
- Career Academies are generally a three- or four-year structure developed around a career theme or Career Clusters. Characterized by career-related electives and integration of career theme across entire academic curriculum.
- Freshman Academies are structure designed to support 9th grade students as they transition into high school.
- Magnet schools are a career-themed SLC that includes accelerated course-work for Gifted & Talented students.

== Courses ==
Core courses include:

- SLC Portfolio
- SLC Honors World History I: Prehistory - 1500
- SLC Honors World History II: 1500–Present
- SLC Honors United States History (or SLC Honors European History)
- SLC Honors Geometry
- SLC Honors Algebra II
- SLC Honors Statistics
- SLC Honors Biology: Ecological & Molecular (E/M)
- SLC Honors Chemistry
- SLC Honors Environmental Science: Practical & Experimental (P/E)
- SLC Heart of Advanced Science (In some schools, this course is called "SLC Integrated Advanced Sciences")
- SLC Honors English I
- SLC Honors English II
- SLC Completion of Advanced English (In some schools, this course is called "SLC Honors English III")

Electives include:

- SLC Language Enrichment (French, Spanish, Japanese, Arabic, Chinese, Russian or German; depending on school)
- SLC Ethics and Philosophy
- SLC Theory of Knowledge (may not be available in most SLC schools; effective 2019)
- SLC Modern Technology
- SLC Computer Sciences
- SLC Arts
- SLC Music Theory
- SLC Design
- SLC Psychology
- SLC Reading and Writing Lab
- SLC Visual and Performing Arts

Other courses:

- Bridge to SLC
  - This is a course for students in grade 8 admitted to SLC in the following year of high school. This prepares students in the structure of SLC with maths, humanities, sciences, and English with an advanced level of preparation. The class conjoins all courses spread in weeks.

== See also ==
- School organizational models
- Small schools movement
