= Transferable skill =

Expertise deemed valid in a range of jobs

A transferable skill is an ability or expertise which may be used in a variety of roles or occupations. Transferable skills are those that are carried from the learning process into practical practice. These skills are believed to be vital to the academic success of a student as well as their ability to perform once in their post education employment roles. Examples of transferable skills include communication and problem-solving.

== Skills transferable to employment contexts ==
Successful navigation of the changing employment landscape requires well-developed employability skills, including career management skills. These skills demonstrate that the learner has done more than understand the information presented in school and can also apply that knowledge in a real life setting. This includes using the learned information in a manner that had not been previously utilized.

The specific skills that are learned in education and transferred to the real or working world are widely defined. The emphasis is often on the traditional educational pillars of written and verbal communication as well as practical mathematical interpretation. However, there are additional skills that are expected of individuals as they enter the workplace that should be picked up throughout their education such as: interpersonal skills, self-management, problem solving, STEM, information technology and foreign language ability. It has been noted that it is difficult to develop a comprehensive list of specific transferrable skills due to the wide range of abilities that are picked up in formal and practical educational settings.

Transferable skills extend to ability of the individual to draw from cross-curricular areas of expertise. An example would be an individual who has learned a world language that is not native and a practical skill such as engineering who has the ability to utilize both of these skill sets to design products for a people from another culture. This type of integration requires cognitive flexibility.

== Educational approaches for transferability ==
The Understanding by Design curricular approach championed by Wiggins and McTighe focused on designing curriculum around the ability to transfer knowledge and skills to new contexts. The specific curricular elements that they recommend are to

- focus curriculum on enduring ideas or skills at the heart of a discipline,
- pose essential questions that provoke genuine inquiry,
- assess students using authentic performance tasks,
- provide learning experiences that equip students to perform skills in a variety of contexts.

It is vital that these four elements are aligned to maximize the transferability of learned skills to new contexts. According to Wiggins and McTighe, one of the core reasons students fail to develop transferable skills is curricula often focus on too many disconnected, short-term objectives designed to cover broad areas of content. Students experience this type of teaching as incoherent and struggle to understand what is important, meaningful, and useful.

Transferrable skills have become a pillar of higher educational goals to assist the student from active learner to the utilization of the skills from academia to the real world. It has been suggested that v in both high school and college lead students to an easier transition to the real world of application and work related tasks. Project-based learning offers a practical way to determine if students as students test out learned skills through a physical project, internship or volunteer work in the field (e.g., service learning).

There has also been a movement to encourage students to gain skills in vocational schools that give them the ability to utilize these skills in a specific subject area as well as offering them practical usage and practice while still in an education setting.

== See also ==
- Transferable skills analysis
