= Selected Characteristics of Occupations =

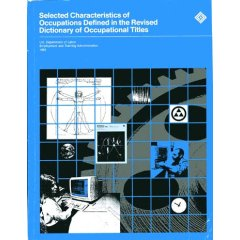

The Selected Characteristics of Occupations (SCO) is a companion volume to the U.S. Department of Labor's Dictionary of Occupational Titles, Revised Fourth Edition, published in 1991. These volumes were intended to provide a detailed representation of thousands of individual occupations in the United States, for the purpose of occupational information, occupational exploration, and job placement.

The Social Security Administration was particularly interested in the Dictionary of Occupational Titles and the SCO for the purpose of establishing the existence of jobs that a claimant for disability benefits could otherwise perform despite his or her mental and/or physical impairments during disability adjudication within the Social Security Administration.

The Dictionary of Occupational Titles was insufficient for disability adjudication at the Social Security Administration because it did not include enough detail about the physical and environmental demands of the jobs listed therein. Accordingly, the Social Security Administration requested that the Department of Labor produce a companion volume to the DOT, which would publish data collected as part of the DOT research, but not previously available. This document is known as the "SCO" or Selected Characteristics of Occupations Defined in the Revised Dictionary of Occupational Titles.

The DOT and SCO are no longer updated. Data elements from these volumes are collected in a new survey, the Occupational Requirements Survey, which is a joint effort between the Social Security Administration and the Bureau of Labor Statistics.

== Use by Social Security Administration ==
In 1960, Kerner v. Flemming, 283 F.2d 916, 921 (2d Cir. 1960) held that there must be a "rational decision" regarding the vocational issues. In response to Kerner and the underling demand for rationality inherent in District Court review, the SSA undertook a search for vocational evidence to support its disability determinations.

Prior to the publication of the Fourth Edition of the DOT, the Social Security Administration requested estimates of worker traits from the Bureau of Employment Security.

"There was also widespread interest among vocational consultants in an abstract of worker traits and physical requirements for occupations such as the Estimates of Worker Trait Requirements for 4,000 jobs, which had been published with the second edition of the Dictionary of Occupational Titles. Basic information about the physical capacities, working conditions, general educational development and specific vocational preparation requirements for the individual jobs could be ascertained by referral to this work. However, such information was needed in more accessible form for vocational assessment, therefore, the Bureau of Disability Insurance entered into an arrangement whereby the Bureau of Employment Security compiled and published a Supplement to the Dictionary of Occupational Titles. Microfilmed data about occupations furnished by the Labor Department was punched into IBM cards by the Social Security Administration's Division of Accounting Operations. Thus, it was possible to abstract selected data about occupations that would be useful for vocational evaluation. This Supplement, entitled Selected Characteristics of Occupations, was published in 1966 and proved to be a valuable tool in supplementing information provided by a disability claimant regarding his past work and in identifying jobs for which he could qualify."

As a result of this work, Social Security Administration's Ruling SSR 00-4p and prior regulations explained: "In making disability determinations, we rely primarily on the DOT (including its companion publication, the SCO) for information about the requirements of work in the national economy. We use these publications at steps 4 and 5 of the sequential evaluation process."

The Social Security Administration determined in 2025 that some jobs in the Dictionary of Occupational Titles may "have been replaced by more modern materials or processes". If a disability adjudicator lists certain occupations as a job that a person could do, the SSA requires additional justification, including evidence that the job "exists in the national economy in numbers that alone, or in combination with work in other cited occupations, are significant." These job titles include "Document Preparer, Microfilming", "Cutter-and-Paster, Press Clippings", "Surveillance-System Monitor", "Nut Sorter", and "Microfilm Processor".

== Contents ==
The SCO provides additional data not found in the two volumes of the DOT. In addition to the DOT codes and Guide for Occupational Information Group codes, the SCO provides the following:

SVP Specific Vocational Preparation

Physical Demands

- SVP Specific Vocational Preparation
- St Strength
- Cl Climbing
- Ba Balancing
- St Stooping
- Kn Kneeling
- Co Crouching
- Cw Crawling
- Re Reaching
- Ha Handling
- Fi Fingering
- Fe Feeling
- Ta Talking
- He Hearing
- Ts Taste/Smell
- NA Near Acuity
- FA Far Acuity
- DP Depth Perception
- Ac Accommodation
- CV Color Vision
- FV Field of Vision

Environmental Demands

- We Exposure to Weather
- Co Extreme Cold
- Ho Extreme Heat
- Hu Wet and/or Humid
- No Noise Intensity Level
- Vi Vibration
- AC Atmospheric Conditions
- MP Proximity to Moving Mechanical Parts
- ES Exposure to Electric Shock
- HE Working in High Exposed Places
- Ra Exposure to Radiation
- Ex Working with Explosives
- TC Exposure to Toxic or Caustic Chemicals
- Ot Other Environmental Conditions

These data are arranged in the SCO in long columns of rows of letters and numbers, which may seem fairly incomprehensible to the uninitiated, such as:

6 S NNNNNNNNN NNNNCNNCNN NNNN3NNNNNNNNN
2 S NNNNNNNNN NNNNCNNOOO NFFN3NNNNNNNNN
3 L NNNNNNNNN NNNNCNNCNN NNNN3NNNNNNONN

== See also ==
- Occupational Requirements Survey
- Vocational education
- Bureau of Labor Statistics
- Surveillance system monitor example of a typical occupation in the SCO
