= Edward Kellogg Strong Jr. =

- Born: August 18, 1884; Syracuse, New York, U.S.
- Died: December 4, 1963 (aged 79); Menlo Park, California, U.S.
- Education: University of California, Berkeley (B.S; M S.); Columbia University (Ph D.)
- Occupations: Psychologist, academic, scholar

Edward Kellogg Strong Jr. (August 18, 1884 – December 4, 1963) was a professor of Applied Psychology at Stanford University, who specialized in organizational psychology and career theory and development. He is most well known for the Strong Interest Inventory, an inventory which matches an individual with a career based on their interests and perceived abilities. He also published several books related to vocational interests and guidance, including Vocational Interests of Men and Women.

== Biography ==
=== Early life ===
Edward Kellogg Strong was born in August 1884 in Syracuse, New York. He was born into a religious family as his father worked in ministry. He graduated from the University of California, Berkeley with a biology degree in 1906. He briefly worked in the United States Forestry Service (from approximately 1906–1909). His job tasks included constructing bridges and landscaping, which lead to a passion for being outdoors. After his work in forestry, he returned to school to complete a master's degree in psychology in 1909. Strong initially planned to teach in China, but due to difficulties obtaining clearance from the government, he decided to pursue a Ph.D. in psychology at Columbia University. At Columbia University, he worked with Dr. James McKeen Cattell and assisted in the psychology laboratory of Dr. Harry Levi Hollingworth, where he met his wife, Margaret Hart. Strong focused his doctoral research and dissertation on the benefits of commercial advertising. His research in advertising eventually led to several research publications and a published book, The Psychology of Selling and Advertisement. He completed his Ph.D. program at Columbia University and married his wife in 1911.

=== Career ===
Strong started his career by working at an advertising firm where he remained for approximately three years. In 1914, Edward Strong began teaching at George Peabody College for Teachers (now part of Vanderbilt University) where he wrote a psychologist professor's guide called Introductory Psychology for Teachers. He left his teaching position and joined the Committee on Classification of Personnel in the Army during World War I in 1917. While in the Army, Edward Strong worked in personnel selection and was responsible for matching army service members to positions within the military according to their interests and aptitude. He also used the Army Alpha and Army Beta tests and instructed military personnel in the use of these instruments.

After his military service, Edward Strong briefly became a researcher at the Carnegie Institute of Technology, where he began studying career theory and industrial/organizational psychology principles. He served as the President of the Southern Society for Philosophy and Psychology from 1918 to 1920. He trained life insurance salespeople and wrote the book The Psychology of Selling Life Insurance. In 1923, he became a full-time faculty member at Stanford University, where he remained for the rest of his career. During his academic career, he chaired approximately 58 dissertation, contributed 46 journal articles, and wrote 6 books. The most well-known of his contributions included: his first edition of the Strong Interest Inventory in 1927, followed by another revised edition in 1938; Vocational Interests in Men and Women in 1943; and Vocational Interests Eighteen Years After College, in 1955.

=== Death and legacy ===
Strong died in Menlo Park, California on December 4, 1963. He received countless acknowledgements for his contributions to the field of psychology and vocational guidance and measurement. John Darley (1964) noted that "it is impossible to estimate how many thousands of young people have been helped in crucial career choices by the use of the Strong Vocational Interest Inventory." Edward Strong's contributions to the field of psychology are still very relevant, as the Strong Interest Inventory continues to be used, over 60 years after its original development.

== Research contributions ==
=== Research in vocational interests ===
Strong believed that significant differences existed between sexes with regard to career interests. This led to the development of separate male and female forms of his career inventories. Strong theorized that career interests were relatively permanent and stable across the lifetime. He conducted longitudinal research that measured vocational interests across periods ranging from 1 to 22 years, and found high test-retest reliability on a vocational interest scale which supported his theory of stable interests across time. Strong believed that it was possible to predict career fit with his interest inventory at a rate that is better than chance, although he acknowledged that a score on a vocational interest inventory has limitations and needs to be taken into consideration with various other factors. Strong believed in the importance of vocational guidance, and stated this guidance is needed throughout the lifespan, as opposed to the traditional implementation of career counseling only during high school. In his book Vocational Interests 18 Years After College, he stated: "The need for guidance is similar to the need of a dentist. Only once in a while is guidance desired, but then it should be provided. And the need is not restricted to youth- it occurs all through life. Adults, as well as boys and girls, have serious problems."

=== Strong Interest Inventory ===
Strong first published research in vocational interest measurement in 1926. Strong hypothesized that an interest inventory can predict a person's entry into an occupation at a better rate than chance. Eventually this led to the creation of the Strong Vocational Interest Blank (SVIB) in 1927, followed by a form for women in 1933. He eventually developed the Strong Interest Inventory, which has been reviewed and modified since his death, but is still in use today.

=== Cross cultural research ===
Strong believed that cultural sensitivity and awareness is important in studying vocational interests. Strong conducted a study that investigated the vocational interests in an African-American sample compared to a Caucasian sample. The results of the study found relatively few differences between the samples and concluded that the study demonstrated evidence for validity of the measures in the study with African-American samples. Strong also hypothesized that vocational interests are similar across cultures. More recent research has confirmed Strong's original theories and findings that vocational interests are similar across cultures.

=== Theories on ability, interest, and achievement ===
Strong theorized that abilities, interests, and achievements all reciprocally worked together to influence vocational development. He used an analogy in his book, Vocational Interests of Men and Women to explain this relationship: "The relationship among abilities, interests, and achievements may be likened to a motor boat with a motor and a rudder. The motor (abilities) determines how fast the boat can go, the rudder (interests) determines which way the boat goes."

== Bibliography ==
- Armstrong, P., Smith, T. J., Donnay, D. C., & Rounds, J. (2004). The Strong Ring: A Basic Interest Model of Occupational Structure. Journal of Counseling Psychology, 51(3), 299-313.
- Carmody, C.E. (1965). The occupational interest of Edward K. Strong Jr. Unpublished master's thesis. University of Wisconsin—Milwaukee.
- Case, J. C., & Blackwell, T. L. (2008). Review of 'Strong Interest Inventory®, Revised Edition'. Rehabilitation Counseling Bulletin, 51(2), 122–126.
- Darley, J. G. (1964). Edward Kellogg Strong Jr., 1884–1963. Journal of Applied Psychology, 48(2), 73–74.
- Donnay, D. C. (1997). E. K. Strong's legacy and beyond: 70 years of the Strong Interest
- Inventory. The Career Development Quarterly, 46(1), 2-22.
- Hansen, J.C. (1982). Changing interests: Myth or reality? Paper presented at the International Congress of Applied Psychology, Edinburgh, Scotland.
- Hansen, J. C. (1987). Edward Kellog Strong Jr.: First author of the Strong Interest Inventory. Journal of Counseling & Development, 66(3), 119–125.
- Most, R. (1992). Edward K. Strong: A thoroughly applied psychologist. Bowling Green, Ohio, US: APA Division 14, Society for Industrial and Organizational Psychology (SIOP).
- Strong, E. Jr. (1920). Introductory psychology for teachers. Oxford England: Warwick & York.
- Strong, E. K. Jr. (1922). The psychology of selling life insurance. Harper Bros.: New York.
- Strong, E. K. Jr. (1925). The psychology of selling and advertising. New York: Mcgraw-Hill.
- Strong, E.K. Jr. (1943). Vocational interests of men and women. Palo Alto, CA: Stanford University Press.
- Strong, E.K. Jr. (1951). Permanence of interest scores over 22 years. Journal of Applied Psychology, 35(2), 89–91.
- Strong, E.K. Jr. (1952). Interests of Negroes and Whites. The Journal of Social Psychology, 35, 139–150.
- Strong, E.K. Jr. (1955). Vocational interests 18 years after college. Minneapolis, MN: University of Minnesota Press.
