= Surveillance system monitor =

Surveillance system monitors are tasked with monitoring premises of public transportation terminals to detect crimes or disturbances, using closed-circuit television monitors, and notifying authorities by telephone of need for corrective action. A monitor observes television screens that transmit in sequence views of transportation facility sites. The monitor pushes the hold button to maintain surveillance of location where the incident is developing, and telephones police or other designated agency to notify authorities of location of disruptive activity. A monitor adjusts monitor controls when required to improve reception, and notifies repair service of equipment malfunctions. Although the number of jobs have declined, the job still exist in some regions of the United States.

== See also ==
- Selected Characteristics of Occupations Defined in the Revised Dictionary of Occupational Titles
- Vocational education
- Bureau of Labor Statistics
