= Ten-year occupational employment projections =

The ten-year occupational employment projection is a projection produced by the US Bureau of Labor Statistics' Office of Occupational Statistics and Employment Projections. The occupational employment projections, along with other information about occupations, are published in the Occupational Outlook Handbook and the National Employment Matrix.

The 10-year projections cover economic growth, employment by industry and occupation, and labor force. They are widely used in career guidance, in planning education and training programs, and in studying long-range employment trends. These projections, which are updated every two years, are part of a nearly 60-year tradition of providing information on occupations to those who are entering the job market, changing careers, or making further education and training choices.

== Employment projections ==
Overall employment is projected to increase about 14 percent during the 2010–2020 decade with more than half a million new jobs expected for each of four occupations—registered nurses, retail salespersons, home health aides, and personal care aides. Occupations that typically need postsecondary education for entry are projected to grow faster than average, but occupations that typically need a high school diploma or less will continue to represent more than half of all jobs.
