= Transferable skills analysis =

Transferable skills analysis is a set of tests or logic to determine what positions a person may fill if their previous position(s) no longer exists in the local job market, or they can no longer perform their last position(s) (e.g., because of an injury). An informal transferable skills analysis can be performed with the help of a career counselor, career portfolio or a career planning article or book. Transferable skills are determined by analyzing past accomplishments or experience. For instance, a stay-at-home parent and homemaker might find they have skills in budgeting, child development, food services, property management, and so on.

== Formal TSA process as per U.S. Department of Labor ==
The formal transferable skills analysis (TSA) process vocational evaluators use consists of compiling occupations from the U.S. Department of Labor's Dictionary of Occupational Titles (DOT) to represent a person's work history. They analyze the work activities (work fields) a person has performed in previous jobs, along with the objects which the work activities were performed on (materials, products, subject matter, and services, or MPSMS). They use these data to identify a set of occupations a worker should be able to perform. Assessment results for reasoning, math, and language skills as well as aptitude test results can be used to increase or decrease vocational options. If the worker has been injured or otherwise disabled, their residual functional capacities can also be considered by the worker traits associated with their DOT work history.

Care must be taken to select the DOT occupations that best represent the jobs the client has performed successfully in past work.

The method most often used to perform skills transfer operations is based upon the federal definition of skills transferability as shown below. That definition utilizes the technology described in The Revised Handbook for Analyzing Jobs (HAJ, 1991). The HAJ describes and explains the variables used in TSA.

=== Work Fields ===
Work fields (WF's) are categories of technologies that reflect how work gets done and what gets done as a result of the work activities—the purpose of the job. DOT occupations may contain one, two, or three work field codes.

=== Materials, Products, Subject Matter, and Services ===
MPSMS are the end products upon which the work activities are performed. MPSMS is derived from the Standard Industrial Classification (SIC) codes, which identify employers by type of business. DOT occupations may contain one, two, or three MPSMS codes.

=== Specific Vocational Preparation ===
Specific Vocational Preparation (SVP) is defined as the amount of time required to learn the duties and acquire the information needed for a specific occupation. This training may be acquired in a school, work, military, institutional, or vocational environment.

=== Worker Traits ===
Worker Traits required to successfully perform a given job are also utilized in TSA process. These variables include training time (SVP), general educational development, aptitudes, temperaments, physical demands, environmental conditions, and relationships to data, people, and things. Job counselors often search for job possibilities that best reflect a person's work experience, then eliminating those that require capability beyond—or significantly below-the person's capabilities expressed by worker traits, to determine transferable skills.

=== TSA software programs ===
There are several TSA software programs, which may or may not follow the Federal Definition of Transferable Skills, including the MVQS (McCroskey Vocational Quotient System), Skilltran, OASYS, Occuda, and RepToolsSSD. Some TSA software programs such as OASYS use Worker Traits as secondary skills transfer variables. The Work Fields, MPSMS, Specific Vocational Preparation, and Combination Work Field variables from the person's work history provide the first filter through which all DOT jobs are passed. Then, only after the resulting sub-set of DOT occupations is placed in a TSA table, the Worker Traits are used as a second filter.

== Federal Definition of Transferable Skills Analysis ==
The Code of Federal Regulations (20 CFR 404.1568 [d]) definition of skills transfer reads, in part:

(A person is considered) to have skills that can be used in other jobs, when the skilled or semiskilled work activities (that person) did in past work can be used to meet the requirements of skilled or semi-skilled work activities of other jobs or kinds of work. This depends largely on the similarity of occupational significant work activities among different jobs.

The transferability of a person's skills is most probable and meaningful among jobs in which:

The same or a lesser degree of skill is required (Specific Vocational Preparation), and The same or similar tools and machines are used (work fields), and The same or similar raw materials, products, processes or services are involved (Materials, Products, Subject Matter, and Services).

The CFR citation is taken from the Social Security Administration's (SSA) regulations. It is useful because it provides a good operational definition of transferability of skills. In the case of TSA, it merely describes how the SSA processes TSA related to claims.

== See also ==
- Workers' compensation
- Selected Characteristics of Occupations Defined in the Revised Dictionary of Occupational Titles
- Vocational education
- Bureau of Labor Statistics
- Career Fit Test - Transferable Skills Analysis
