= David P. Campbell =

American psychologist

David P. Campbell was an American psychologist who co-authored the Strong-Campbell Interest Inventory which is widely used in vocational counseling. He was also the author of several popular books in psychology.

== Early life and education ==
Campbell received his B.S. and M.S. degrees from Iowa State University, and his Ph.D. in psychology from the University of Minnesota, where he served as professor of psychology.

== Awards and honors ==
For the accomplishment of the interest inventory work, he was awarded the E.K. Strong Jr Gold Medal for excellence in psychological testing research, an Honorary Doctorate of Humane Letters from the University of Colorado in 1998, and the 2001 Distinguished Professional Contributions Award from the Society for Industrial and Organizational Psychology.
