= Occupational Outlook Handbook =

Publication on American labor

- 2019-2029 edition
- Author: Bureau of Labor Statistics, US Department of Labor
- Language: English
- Subject: Career guidance
- Published: 1948–present
- Publication place: United States
- Media type: Print (ceased); Online

The Occupational Outlook Handbook (OOH) is a publication of the United States Department of Labor's Bureau of Labor Statistics that includes information about the nature of work, working conditions, training and education, earnings and job outlook for hundreds of different occupations in the United States. It is released biennially with a companion publication, the Career Guide to Industries and is available free of charge from the Bureau of Labor Statistics' website. The 2012–13 edition was released in November 2012 and the 2014–15 edition in March 2014.

Because it is a work by the United States federal government, the Handbook is not under copyright and is reproduced in various forms by other publishers, often with additional information or features.

The first edition was published in 1948.

== See also ==
- Career development
- Global Career Development Facilitator (GCDF)
- Holland Codes
- Lists of occupations
- Myers–Briggs Type Indicator
- Standard Occupational Classification System
