= Jack E. Singley Academy =

School in Irving, Texas, United States

Jack E. Singley Academy (The Academy of Irving ISD)

Location
- 4601 North MacArthur Boulevard; Irving, Texas 75038; United States; 32.867696°N 96.961455°W

Information
- School type: Public school, career based (U.S.)
- Principal: Brandi Johnson
- Staff: 107.30 (FTE)
- Grades: 9–12
- Enrollment: 1,686 (2019–20)
- Student to teacher ratio: 15.71
- Color
- Mascot: Phoenix
- Website: singley.irvingisd.net

Jack E. Singley Academy (formerly The Academy of Irving ISD) is a career-oriented public high school in Irving, Texas, United States. The school is a part of the Irving Independent School District. The Academy grants admission to students through a non-merit based selection process, which requires applying to the school during the spring semester of their 8th grade year. Students who are not selected may reapply their 9th and 10th grade years.

In 2009, 2010 and 2011 the school was rated "recognized" by the Texas Education Agency.

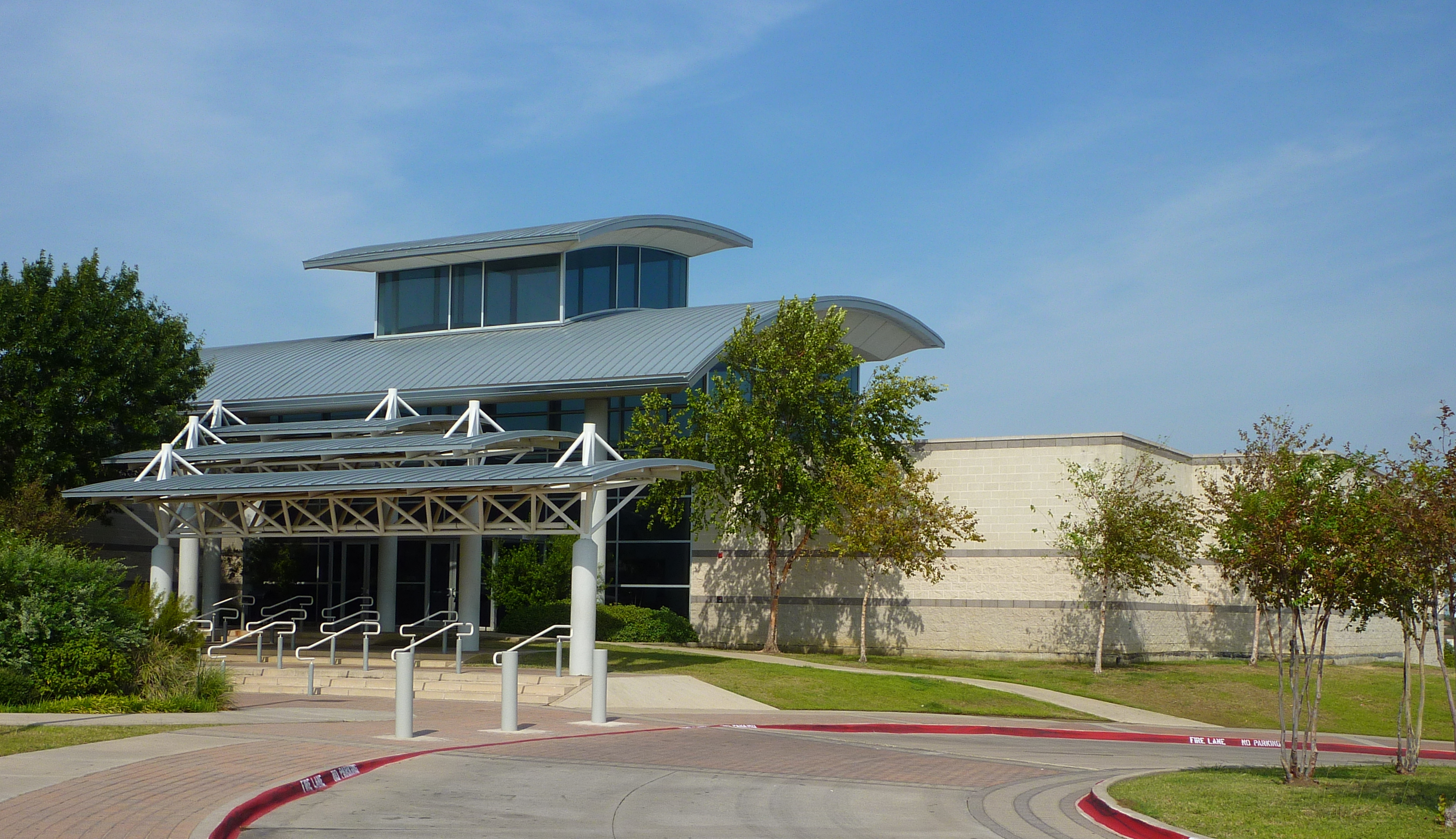
Main entrance

== Demographics ==
(as of 2017)

- African American 7.7%
- Asian 7.2%
- Pacific Islander 0.2%
- American Indian 1.1%
- Hispanic 74.6%
- White 8.4%

== Curriculum ==
The school differs from other high schools in that it is an academy-based school offering six 'Schools of Specialty': Engineering (Manufacturing & Robotics), Information Technology, Culinary Arts and Hospitality Studies, Legal Studies, Health Science, and Arts and Communication. These career studies advance as the student progresses and branches out into more specific careers in that program.

== History and facilities ==
The Academy is a comprehensive high school that opened its doors during the 2001–02 school year. The school accommodates 1700 students in grades nine to twelve.

Approved by Irving ISD voters as part of a school bond package in October 1997, The Academy of Irving ISD was constructed on the southeast corner of the North Lake College campus along MacArthur Boulevard in Las Colinas. The school was designed as a feeder school for students from the District's three existing high schools who would specialize in one of six specializations: Advanced & Applied Technology Studies; Education & Early Childhood Studies; Entrepreneurship & Tourism Studies; Legal Studies; Medical & Dental Studies; and Visual Arts & Communication Studies.

The Academy was built to function more as a business office environment rather than a traditional high school, intending to immerse students in a professional workplace setting. Differing features include the absence of lockers (typical classroom materials such as textbooks are not used in lieu of digital alternatives), the inclusion of several windows into each classroom (built for visitors to observe students utilizing the technologies of the building), and the built-in infrastructure of the school allowing for the use of many electronic devices in each room (i.e. multiple electrical outlets and Ethernet ports). The school does not utilize bells to transition from class to class and instead enables students to manage their time between classes.

In 2004, The Academy of Irving ISD became a stand-alone campus without dependency on the other high schools. The students and staff chose its school colors as silver, black, and white, borrowing the secondary colors of the three traditional Irving ISD high schools, silver from Nimitz High School, black from Irving High School, and white from MacArthur High School.

A non-spectator gymnasium and 500-seat performing arts center were added in 2009, increasing the opportunities for physical education and fine arts programs offered at the school.

The school was renamed on May 18, 2009, to honor retiring superintendent Jack Erwin Singley.

The student body selected the phoenix as the official school mascot at the end of the 2014-2015 school year. Work on the formation of the mascot began early in the 2014-2015 school year with former principal Dr.Tamy Smalskas and the student-led Senior Class Officer organization. A committee consisting of students, administration, teachers, parents, and faculty members helped curate ideas for mascots.

At the Irving ISD high school graduation ceremony of the 2014–15 school year, student committee member, and member of the Senior Class Officers, Elisha Lucero gave a speech introducing the new mascot to the district and community.

=== Design ===
Designed by Powell/PSP Architects, the school is embedded into a hillside, which enabled at-grade access to each of the building's three stories. The building is organized around "Main Street", a mall-like circulation spine with abundant natural light and a 3-story atrium, with direct access to a food court and other fully functioning "real world" facilities in which students from a related Academy could work and study, including medical and dental clinics, a municipal courtroom, and a retail store for students. Planned but never built was a daycare center. The school was designed to accommodate the District's new policy, which was first implemented here, of providing every student with a laptop computer.

=== Awards ===
Its advanced design was recognized with several awards: the 2004 CEFPI James D. MacConnell Award for Excellence in Design (finalist), Walter Taylor Architecture Award Outstanding Educational Environment - 2003, American Institute of Architects / American Association of School Administrators / CEFPI; Project of Distinction Award - 2002, CEFPI; Design Award / School Architecture Exhibit - 2002, Texas Association of School Boards / Texas Association of School Administrators; Impact on Learning Award - 2002 School Planning & Management / CEFPI.
