= School organizational models =

School organizational models are methods of structuring the curriculum, functions, and facilities for schools, colleges, and universities. The organizing of teaching and learning has been structured since the first educational institutions were established. With greater specialization and expertise in a particular field of knowledge, and a gathering of like-minded individuals, instructors clustered into specialized groups, schools, and eventually departments within larger institutions. This structure spread rapidly during the 19th and 20th centuries with factory model schools and their "assembly-line" method of standardized curriculum and instructional methods. Beginning with the progressive educational movement in the early-mid 20th century, and again with similar trends in the late 20th and early 21st century, alternative models structured towards deeper learning, higher retention, and 21st century skills developed. The organizational models of schools fall into several main categories, including: departmental, integrative, project-based, academy, small learning communities, and school-within-a-school.

== Departmental model ==
The departmental model is an organization where the departments and faculties of different academic subjects are separate and distinct. Each department (e.g. Math, Humanities, Science) may also have its own head (or manager or dean) that is responsible for different aspects of the department. Educators in that department may report to that head who in turn reports to a higher level administration, such as a school or college in a university, or directly to the main administration, such as the principal or head of a school. Educational institutions using the departmental model often provide traditional education maths. This is a traditional form of organization with an emphasis on traditional classroom forms and organizations that has been the dominant organizing model of high or secondary schools, colleges, and universities since the late 19th and early 20th century. This is reflected in the design of educational facilities with separate faculty buildings on a campus, or in a wing or cluster of standard classrooms or laboratories in a high school (e.g. science labs, vocational shops).

== Integrative model ==
The integrative model is an interdisciplinary organization that combines, rather than separates, academic subjects, faculties, and disciplines. A departmental structure may be in place for each field or discipline, but the physical organization of the educational facilities may place different subject-based classrooms or labs in groupings, such as in a defined area, wing, or small learning community. For example, each grouping may contain co-located classrooms with different instructors focusing on math, English, and Social Sciences near to a science lab, makerspace, or vocational shop. Support spaces for instructors, such as offices or workrooms, and for students, such as seminar rooms and common workspaces, may also be located directly adjacent or nearby.

== Project based learning model ==
The project-based learning model is a model that supports students "learning by doing." It may or not be fully interdisciplinary in its organization of subjects. Unlike traditional, teacher-led classroom-based instruction, students often must organize their own work and manage their own time in a project-based class, with an emphasis on student collaboration and hands-on work. It involves independent research, real-world experiences, opportunities and requirements for students to present and defend their learning, to practice and rehearse. Student projects are at the core of their learning. This is reflected in the design of educational facilities appearing similar to the integrative model, but with a de-emphasis on traditional instructional spaces such as classrooms and labs, and a greater emphasis on student collaboration spaces and workspaces, such as individual study and group seminar rooms, and workspaces such as Makerspaces and rooms with 2D or 3D printing and production. The design is student-centered, meaning it is to support the project work, not primarily the convenience of the teachers (e.g. classrooms). A notable example of this model is High Tech High.

== Academy model ==
The academy model is an organization first developed in 1969 that includes specific themes or grades-based organizational groupings within a single institution. These are also referred to as "career academies" or "career pathways". The school may be organized along largely departmental or integrated models, with specially courses geared towards the theme or focus of each academy provided within each academy and the students be enrolled and following their academy's prescribed course of study as they take courses in different departments.

According to the National Academy Career Coalition, academies consist of a Smaller Learning Community (SLC) and an advisory board, which consists of local and community members. It also includes a group of teachers, who work together to ensure that students follow a program of study. Within this model, students are able to take other electives as well. The National Academy Career Coalition holds a list of rubric-based standards for academies, which are known as the National Standards of Practice. The standards were created in 2004 by the Department of Labor, with the NCAC being the certificating organization since 2009.

Alternatively, the school may be organized with each academy providing its own core and specialty themed courses. This can be reflected in the design of educational facilities in several ways: a departmental-type configuration with specialty spaces located in separate areas, or along a single common area with each academy's themed spaces adjacent and observables by students in other academies; or in a similar manner to an SLC or school-within-a-school, with each academy co-located with their specialty space.

For example, a justice-themed academy may have a fully functioning country courtroom off of the commons, such as along the "Main Street" in the Jack E. Singley Academy. In Hawaii, academy-based Waipahu High School opened a Health Clinic in 2023, which is operated by its Health Academy students.

In England, Academy normally refers to an entire institution offering a distinct program or theme, not a separate division within.

== Small learning communities model ==
The Small Learning Community (SLC) model is an organization geared towards providing a more personalized learning environment. A cohort of students and instructors may stay within a given SLC from grade to grade. Teachers in the SLC usually have common planning time to foster collaboration, development of interdisciplinary projects, and to track progress of individual students across subjects. These include several types, including: Theme-Based SLCs or Focus Schools, usually formed around a specific curricular theme, such as "Success Academy" or "Humanities"; grade-based SLCs or Houses, such as Freshman Academies which are structured to support students transitioning into higher-level schools; Career Academies, developed around a career theme or Career Clusters; Magnet Schools, career-themed SLCs that include accelerated course-work for Gifted & Talented students. This is reflected in the design of educational facilities with SLCs designed into separate clusters or groupings, often with a central common or flexible learning area at its heart of the cluster, with a variety of learning and group meeting rooms opening onto it, including several classrooms or learning studios, a science lab, and potentially a makerspace or vocational shop. A school would have multiple SLCs, often with between 100 and 200 students.

== School-within-a-school model ==
The school-within-a-school model is similar to the Small Learning Communities model of personalization for both students and schools, but with additional administrative and support functions located within each school or "community". Each school has both multiple disciplines as well as separate administrators, either fully stand-alone or as subordinate to a whole-school administration or principal. This is reflected in the design of educational facilities with a larger school building, or a campus, with separate identities, entries, and often names for each small school. An example of this model is the Marysville Getchell Campus with separate buildings for each of the three small schools as well as a common shared facility for the physical education, cafeteria, and services functions not as easily supported by smaller schools.

== See also ==
- Blended learning
- Factory model school
- Flipped classroom
- Learning environment
- Learning space
- Open air school
- Virtual school
