= Career development =

Evolution of a person's job positions over time

Career development refers to the process an individual may undergo to evolve their occupational status. It is the process of making decisions for long term learning, to align personal needs of physical or psychological fulfillment with career advancement opportunities. Career Development can also refer to the total encompassment of an individual's work-related experiences, leading up to the occupational role they may hold within an organization.

Career development can occur on an individual basis or an organizational level.

== Career development planning ==
On an individual basis, career planning encompasses a process in which the individual is self-aware of their personal needs and desires for fulfilment in their personal life, in conjunction with the career they hold. While every person's experiences are unique, this contributes to the different careers that people will acquire over their lifespan.

=== Long-term careers ===
Careers that are long-term commitments throughout an individual's life are referred to as steady-state careers. The person will work towards their retirement with specialized skillsets learned throughout their entire life. For example, somebody would be required to complete a steady process of graduating from medical school and then working in the medical profession until they have retired. Steady-state careers may also be referred to as holding the same occupational role in an organization for an extended period and becoming specialized in the area of expertise. For example, a retail manager who has worked in the sales industry for an extended period of their life would have the knowledge, skills, and attributes regarding managing non-managerial staff and coordinating job tasks to be fulfilled by subordinates.

A career that requires new initiatives of growth and responsibility upon accepting new roles can be referred to as linear careers, as every unique opportunity entails a more significant impact of responsibility and decision-making power on an organizational environment. A linear career path involves a vertical movement in the hierarchy of management when one is promoted. For example, a higher-level management position in a company would entail more responsibility regarding decision-making and allocation of resources to effectively and efficiently run a company. Mid-level managers and top-level managers/CEOs would be referred to as having linear careers, as their vertical movement in the organizational hierarchy would also entail more responsibilities for planning, controlling, leading, and organizing managerial tasks.

=== Short-term careers ===
When individuals take on a short-term or temporary work, these are transitory careers and spiral careers. Transitory careers occur when a person undergoes frequent job changes, in which each task is not similar to the preceding one. For example, a fast-food worker who leaves the food industry after a year to work as an entry-level bookkeeper or an administrative assistant in an office setting is a Transitory Career change. The worker's skills and knowledge of their previous job role will not be relevant to their new role.

A spiral career is any series of short term jobs that are non-identical to one another, but still contribute to skill-building of a specific attribute that individuals will accept over their lifetime.

== Career development perspectives: individual versus organizational needs ==
An individual's personal initiatives that they pursue for their career development are primarily concerned with their personal values, goals, interests, and the path required to fulfill these desires. A degree of control and sense of urgency over a personal career development path can require an individual to pursue additional education or training initiatives to align with their goals. In relation, John L. Holland's 6 career anchors categorizes people to be investigative, realistic, artistic, social, enterprising, and conventional, in which the career path will depend on the characteristic that an individual may embody.

The factors that influence an individual to make proper career goal decisions also relies on the environmental factors that are directly affecting them. Decisions are based on varying aspects affecting work-life balance, desires to align career options with their personal values, and the degree of stimulation or growth.

A corporate organization can be sufficient in providing career development opportunities through the Human Resources functions of Training and Development. The primary purpose of Training and Development is to ensure that the strategic planning of the organizational goals will remain adaptable to the demands of a changing environment. Upon recruiting and hiring employees, an organization's Human Resource department is responsible for providing clear job descriptions regarding the job tasks at hand required for the role, along with the opportunities of job rotation, transfers, and promotions. Hiring managers are responsible for ensuring that the subordinates are aware of their job tasks, and ensure the flow of communication remains efficient. In relation, managers are also responsible for nurturing and creating a favorable work environment to work in, to foster the long term learning, development, and talent acquisition of their subordinates. Consequently, the extent to which a manager embraces the delegation of training and developing their employees plays a key factor in the retention and turnover of employees.

=== Quiet ambition ===
Quiet ambition is a work mindset where an employee is driven by their own values and life goals over their employer's financial performance.

== Relative context of social identity in career planning ==
As the process of career planning is relational to balancing the varying factors of demands in an individual's life, socio-demographics factors relating to an individual's age, race, gender, and socio-economic status may influence the extent to which they pursue career planning or other opportunities for training and development of skills. The varying aspects of social identity in relation to the context of finding a balance to the demands in personal life will influence individuals to make decisions to change, adapt, or abandon their career path.

Both men and women for example, will make different types of decisions based on the situational factors that require balance. Women tend to make more choices to balance work and non-work priorities such as child or elder care. This may also discourage some women to pursue their career path, and focus on prioritizing assistance for others. Men will make decisions based on not only having to balance work and non-work priorities, but for advancement and added income.

== See also ==
- Employment counsellor
- Global Career Development Facilitator (GCDF)
- Holland Codes
- Occupational Outlook Handbook
- Personality psychology

=== Notable figures in career development ===
- John L. Holland – American psychologist (1919–2008)
- Frank Parsons – Father of Vocational Guidance
- Edgar Schein – Swiss-American psychologist (1928–2023)
