= Standard Occupational Classification System =

United States government system

The Standard Occupational Classification (SOC) System is a United States government system for classifying occupations. It is used by U.S. federal government agencies collecting occupational data, enabling comparison of occupations across data sets. For example, data from the Occupational Requirements Survey, Occupational Information Network, and the Occupational Employment and Wage Statistics program can be linked using the classification system. The SOC is designed to cover all occupations in which work is performed for pay or profit, reflecting the current occupational structure in the United States. The 2018 SOC includes 867 detailed occupations.

Users of occupational data include human resources professionals, government program managers, industrial and labor relations practitioners, students considering career training, job seekers, vocational training schools, and employers wishing to set salary scales or locate a new plant.

An occupation is defined as a group of "jobs that are similar with respect to the work performed and the skills possessed by workers." Therefore, different jobs with similar duties and job requirements would be in the same occupation. For example, a bank branch manager and a city treasurer would both be part of the Financial Manager occupation in the SOC.

The detailed occupations in the SOC can be combined into 459 broad occupations, 98 minor groups, and 23 major groups. The SOC codes have a hierarchical format, so for example the code "15-0000" refers to occupations in the "Computer and Mathematical Occupations" major group, and "15-1252" is a subset for the "Software Developers" detailed occupation.

The SOC does not categorize industries or employers. There are parallel category systems for industries used with SOC data, most commonly NAICS.

Other countries have national occupational classification systems and the International Labour Organization, an agency of the United Nations, has developed the International Standard Classification of Occupations.

== Job Titles and SOC Codes ==
The Bureau of Labor Statistics (BLS) maintains the Direct Match Title File (DMTF) that contains job titles that match detailed occupations in the SOC. For example, the following job titles all match to the occupation Bill and Account Collectors (SOC code of 43-3011): Collection Agent, Collections Clerk, Collections Representative, Debt Collector, Installment Agent, Installment Loan Collector, Insurance Collector, Payment Collector, Repossessor, and Billing Clerk.

In some cases a job title does not match one-for-one with an occupation. For example, the job title "painter" is not in the DMTF because it could be associated with a fine arts occupation or a maintenance occupation. In these and other cases, persons wishing to match a job with an occupation can examine the definitions of the detailed occupations. For example, the definition of the occupation of Painters, Construction and Maintenance (SOC code of 47-2141) is: "Paint walls, equipment, buildings, bridges, and other structural surfaces, using brushes, rollers, and spray guns. May remove old paint to prepare surface prior to painting. May mix colors or oils to obtain desired color or consistency." On the other hand, the definition of the occupation of Fine Artists, Including Painters, Sculptors, and Illustrators (SOC code of 27-1013) is: "Create original artwork using any of a wide variety of media and techniques."

Interested parties can submit suggested additions to the job titles included in the DMTF.

== Major Group Occupations ==
=== List ===
The detailed occupations in the SOC can be combined into 23 major groups.

- Architecture and engineering occupations
- Arts, design, entertainment, sports, and media occupations
- Building and grounds cleaning and maintenance occupations
- Business and financial operations occupations
- Community and social services occupations
- Computer and mathematical occupations
- Construction and extraction occupations
- Education, training, and library occupations
- Farming, fishing, and forestry occupations
- Food preparation and serving related occupations
- Healthcare practitioners and technical occupations
- Healthcare support occupations
- Installation, maintenance, and repair occupations
- Legal occupations
- Life, physical, and social science occupations
- Management occupations
- Military specific occupations
- Office and administrative support occupations
- Personal care and service occupations
- Production occupations
- Protective service occupations
- Sales and related occupations
- Transportation and material moving occupations

=== Employment and Earnings ===
Across all occupations, BLS reports total employment to be 151,853,870 and the annual mean wage to be $65,470. Total employment and annual mean wage for each major group is in the following table.

| SOC | Major Group | Employment | Annual Mean Wage |
|---|---|---|---|
| 11-0000 | Management Occupations | 10,495,770 | $137,750 |
| 13-0000 | Business and Financial Operations Occupations | 10,087,830 | $90,580 |
| 15-0000 | Computer and Mathematical Occupations | 5,177,400 | $113,140 |
| 17-0000 | Architecture and Engineering Occupations | 2,539,660 | $99,090 |
| 19-0000 | Life, Physical, and Social Science Occupations | 1,389,430 | $87,870 |
| 21-0000 | Community and Social Service Occupations | 2,418,130 | $58,980 |
| 23-0000 | Legal Occupations | 1,240,630 | $133,820 |
| 25-0000 | Educational Instruction and Library Occupations | 8,744,560 | $66,400 |
| 27-0000 | Arts, Design, Entertainment, Sports, and Media Occupations | 2,106,490 | $75,520 |
| 29-0000 | Healthcare Practitioners and Technical Occupations | 9,284,210 | $102,060 |
| 31-0000 | Healthcare Support Occupations | 7,063,530 | $38,220 |
| 33-0000 | Protective Service Occupations | 3,504,330 | $57,710 |
| 35-0000 | Food Preparation and Serving Related Occupations | 13,247,870 | $34,490 |
| 37-0000 | Building and Grounds Cleaning and Maintenance Occupations | 4,429,070 | $38,320 |
| 39-0000 | Personal Care and Service Occupations | 3,040,630 | $38,430 |
| 41-0000 | Sales and Related Occupations | 13,380,660 | $53,280 |
| 43-0000 | Office and Administrative Support Occupations | 18,533,450 | $47,940 |
| 45-0000 | Farming, Fishing, and Forestry Occupations | 432,200 | $39,970 |
| 47-0000 | Construction and Extraction Occupations | 6,225,630 | $61,500 |
| 49-0000 | Installation, Maintenance, and Repair Occupations | 5,989,460 | $58,500 |
| 51-0000 | Production Occupations | 8,770,170 | $47,620 |
| 53-0000 | Transportation and Material Moving Occupations | 13,752,760 | $46,690 |

=== Environmental Conditions ===
Across all occupations, 6.9 percent of all workers are exposed to hazardous contaminants.

Across all occupations, about 67 percent of all workers are not exposed to the outdoors. However, among all workers, 4.1 percent are constantly exposed to the outdoors, 3.7 percent are frequently exposed to the outdoors, 15.1 percent are occasionally exposed to the outdoors, and 10.2 percent are seldomly exposed to the outdoors. Exposure to hazardous contaminants and exposure to the outdoors (seldom, occasional, frequent, or constant) for each major group are in the following table.

| SOC | Major Group | Exposure to Hazardous Contaminants (%) | Exposure to Outdoors (%) |
|---|---|---|---|
| 11-0000 | Management Occupations | 1.9 | 23.8 |
| 13-0000 | Business and Financial Operations Occupations | 0.7 | 9.1 |
| 15-0000 | Computer and Mathematical Occupations | <0.5 | 1.6 |
| 17-0000 | Architecture and Engineering Occupations | 6.3 | 31.8 |
| 19-0000 | Life, Physical, and Social Science Occupations | 26.6 | 36.3 |
| 21-0000 | Community and Social Service Occupations | 0.8 | 24.2 |
| 23-0000 | Legal Occupations | <0.5 | 1.6 |
| 25-0000 | Educational Instruction and Library Occupations | 1.8 | 42.9 |
| 27-0000 | Arts, Design, Entertainment, Sports, and Media Occupations | 0.8 | 27.7 |
| 29-0000 | Healthcare Practitioners and Technical Occupations | 6.8 | 7.3 |
| 31-0000 | Healthcare Support Occupations | 2.8 | 33.1 |
| 33-0000 | Protective Service Occupations | 22.8 | 89.4 |
| 35-0000 | Food Preparation and Serving Related Occupations | 1.3 | 33.5 |
| 37-0000 | Building and Grounds Cleaning and Maintenance Occupations | 18.4 | 73.8 |
| 39-0000 | Personal Care and Service Occupations | 9.2 | 51.5 |
| 41-0000 | Sales and Related Occupations | 1.2 | 28.1 |
| 43-0000 | Office and Administrative Support Occupations | <0.5 | 4.7 |
| 45-0000 | Farming, Fishing, and Forestry Occupations | 8.9 | 82.5 |
| 47-0000 | Construction and Extraction Occupations | 28.9 | 92.4 |
| 49-0000 | Installation, Maintenance, and Repair Occupations | 31.7 | 79.4 |
| 51-0000 | Production Occupations | 18.9 | 11.4 |
| 53-0000 | Transportation and Material Moving Occupations | 5.6 | 57.6 |

=== Minimum Education Requirements ===
Minimum education is the minimum education required by a job, not the educational attainment of the worker. A worker may have attained more education than the minimum required by a job.

Among all workers, 30.0 percent are in jobs with no minimum education requirement, 40.1 percent are in jobs where a high school degree is the minimum requirement, 19.3 percent are in jobs where a bachelor's degree is the minimum requirement, and 10.6 percent are in jobs with some other minimum requirement (for example, a graduate degree).

The percentages in the various minimum requirement categories for each major group in the SOC are shown in the following table.

| SOC | Major Group | No Minimum Requirement (%) | High School (%) | Bachelor's (%) | Other (%) |
|---|---|---|---|---|---|
| 11-0000 | Management Occupations | 4.7 | 24.7 | 56.6 | 14.0 |
| 13-0000 | Business and Financial Operations Occupations | 1.7 | 21.7 | 69.9 | 6.7 |
| 15-0000 | Computer and Mathematical Occupations | 2.8 | 17.7 | 65.5 | 14.0 |
| 17-0000 | Architecture and Engineering Occupations | 1.9 | 12.5 | 69.5 | 16.1 |
| 19-0000 | Life, Physical, and Social Science Occupations | 2.1 | 18.7 | 52.0 | 27.2 |
| 21-0000 | Community and Social Service Occupations | 1.6 | 16.5 | 40.9 | 41.0 |
| 23-0000 | Legal Occupations | 0.6 | 19.4 | 10.9 | 69.1 |
| 25-0000 | Educational Instruction and Library Occupations | 1.5 | 17.2 | 59.4 | 21.9 |
| 27-0000 | Arts, Design, Entertainment, Sports, and Media Occupations | 19.8 | 27.7 | 42.9 | 9.6 |
| 29-0000 | Healthcare Practitioners and Technical Occupations | 0.9 | 21.1 | 22.7 | 55.3 |
| 31-0000 | Healthcare Support Occupations | 26.8 | 63.4 | 0.7 | 9.1 |
| 33-0000 | Protective Service Occupations | 9.4 | 82.3 | 3.1 | 5.2 |
| 35-0000 | Food Preparation and Serving Related Occupations | 78.3 | 21.2 | <0.5 | <0.5 |
| 37-0000 | Building and Grounds Cleaning and Maintenance Occupations | 68.7 | 30.0 | <0.5 | <0.5 |
| 39-0000 | Personal Care and Service Occupations | 32.0 | 60.7 | 3.2 | 4.1 |
| 41-0000 | Sales and Related Occupations | 50.7 | 39.6 | 7.9 | 1.8 |
| 43-0000 | Office and Administrative Support Occupations | 13.1 | 75.6 | 5.7 | 5.6 |
| 45-0000 | Farming, Fishing, and Forestry Occupations | 49.4 | 42.6 | 6.2 | 1.8 |
| 47-0000 | Construction and Extraction Occupations | 49.6 | 47.1 | 0.8 | 2.5 |
| 49-0000 | Installation, Maintenance, and Repair Occupations | 27.5 | 61.2 | 1.2 | 10.1 |
| 51-0000 | Production Occupations | 39.2 | 55.5 | 1.5 | 3.8 |
| 53-0000 | Transportation and Material Moving Occupations | 60.2 | 39.2 | <0.5 | <0.5 |

=== Physical Requirements ===
The maximum weight lifted or carried averaged 25.58 pounds for all workers. For all workers, the percentage of the workday a person is required to stand averaged 56.3 percent of the workday. The figures for each major group in the SOC are in the following table.

| SOC | Major Group | Maximum Weight Lifted or Carried, Average (Pounds) | Percent of the Workday Required to Stand, Average (Percentage) |
|---|---|---|---|
| 11-0000 | Management Occupations | 9.30 | 27.4 |
| 13-0000 | Business and Financial Operations Occupations | 5.55 | 13.2 |
| 15-0000 | Computer and Mathematical Occupations | 7.87 | 11.1 |
| 17-0000 | Architecture and Engineering Occupations | 13.11 | 26.4 |
| 19-0000 | Life, Physical, and Social Science Occupations | 18.10 | 37.3 |
| 21-0000 | Community and Social Service Occupations | 10.53 | 29.6 |
| 23-0000 | Legal Occupations | 6.80 | 15.2 |
| 25-0000 | Educational Instruction and Library Occupations | 14.61 | 60.2 |
| 27-0000 | Arts, Design, Entertainment, Sports, and Media Occupations | 14.78 | 32.7 |
| 29-0000 | Healthcare Practitioners and Technical Occupations | 33.06 | 63.3 |
| 31-0000 | Healthcare Support Occupations | 34.72 | 69.4 |
| 33-0000 | Protective Service Occupations | 53.71 | 56.8 |
| 35-0000 | Food Preparation and Serving Related Occupations | 26.34 | 97.2 |
| 37-0000 | Building and Grounds Cleaning and Maintenance Occupations | 37.23 | 88.2 |
| 39-0000 | Personal Care and Service Occupations | 23.70 | 75.7 |
| 41-0000 | Sales and Related Occupations | 21.68 | 68.6 |
| 43-0000 | Office and Administrative Support Occupations | 9.13 | 20.6 |
| 45-0000 | Farming, Fishing, and Forestry Occupations | 35.40 | 77.5 |
| 47-0000 | Construction and Extraction Occupations | 51.18 | 81.5 |
| 49-0000 | Installation, Maintenance, and Repair Occupations | 53.93 | 79.6 |
| 51-0000 | Production Occupations | 37.45 | 81.2 |
| 53-0000 | Transportation and Material Moving Occupations | 43.74 | 65.2 |

=== Pace of Work and Breaks ===
Across all occupations, 38.9 percent of all workers are required to work at a consistent and generally fast pace, 52.9 percent are required to work at a pace that varies, and 8.2 percent at a consistent and generally slow pace.

About 56.2 percent of workers have the ability to “pause work and take short, unscheduled breaks throughout the workday.”

Pace of work and the ability to pause work for each major group are in the following table.

| SOC | Major Group | Fast Work Pace (%) | Ability to Pause Work (%) |
|---|---|---|---|
| 11-0000 | Management Occupations | 41.3 | 97.5 |
| 13-0000 | Business and Financial Operations Occupations | 39.3 | 97.0 |
| 15-0000 | Computer and Mathematical Occupations | 40.9 | 96.0 |
| 17-0000 | Architecture and Engineering Occupations | 36.9 | 95.1 |
| 19-0000 | Life, Physical, and Social Science Occupations | 34.3 | 82.6 |
| 21-0000 | Community and Social Service Occupations | 38.0 | 80.3 |
| 23-0000 | Legal Occupations | 52.3 | 95.3 |
| 25-0000 | Educational Instruction and Library Occupations | 37.0 | 38.9 |
| 27-0000 | Arts, Design, Entertainment, Sports, and Media Occupations | 39.4 | 74.3 |
| 29-0000 | Healthcare Practitioners and Technical Occupations | 48.2 | 40.9 |
| 31-0000 | Healthcare Support Occupations | 38.3 | 37.6 |
| 33-0000 | Protective Service Occupations | 18.3 | 13.2 |
| 35-0000 | Food Preparation and Serving Related Occupations | 31.0 | 22.6 |
| 37-0000 | Building and Grounds Cleaning and Maintenance Occupations | 41.8 | 73.7 |
| 39-0000 | Personal Care and Service Occupations | 33.6 | 35.0 |
| 41-0000 | Sales and Related Occupations | 24.2 | 45.5 |
| 43-0000 | Office and Administrative Support Occupations | 37.2 | 70.8 |
| 45-0000 | Farming, Fishing, and Forestry Occupations | 41.6 | 67.3 |
| 47-0000 | Construction and Extraction Occupations | 46.1 | 61.5 |
| 49-0000 | Installation, Maintenance, and Repair Occupations | 32.7 | 71.8 |
| 51-0000 | Production Occupations | 55.8 | 42.5 |
| 53-0000 | Transportation and Material Moving Occupations | 48.7 | 31.4 |

== History ==
The SOC was established in 1977, and revised by a committee representing specialists from across U.S. government agencies in the 1990s. SOC codes were updated again in 2010, and on November 28, 2017, the Office of Management and Budget (OMB) published a Federal Register notice detailing the final decisions for the 2018 SOC.

== See also ==
- Designation of workers by collar color
- Dictionary of Occupational Titles (DOT) First Published 1938. Last complete update 1977. Last revised edition published (DOT, 4th ed.) in 1991. Now out of print, the DOT is used by Administrative Law Judges (as required by statute) to encode physical requirements of occupations to make Occupational Law determinations, and for research using its detail over the period covered.
- International Standard Classification of Occupations
- National Occupational Classification (NOC) (in Canada)
- Occupational Information Network (O*NET) Comprehensive information based largely on input from individuals who have personally performed over 970 'data-level' occupational categories; taxonomic information about 40 'non-data-level' categories (970+ 40 = a total of 1010 occupations); includes 840 SOC categories and many specialized O*NET-SOC categories.
- Occupational Outlook Handbook (OOH) Created and maintained by the U.S. Bureau of Labor Statistics (BLS)
