= Career counseling =

Professional advice on occupational choice

Vocational guidance
- MeSH: D014830

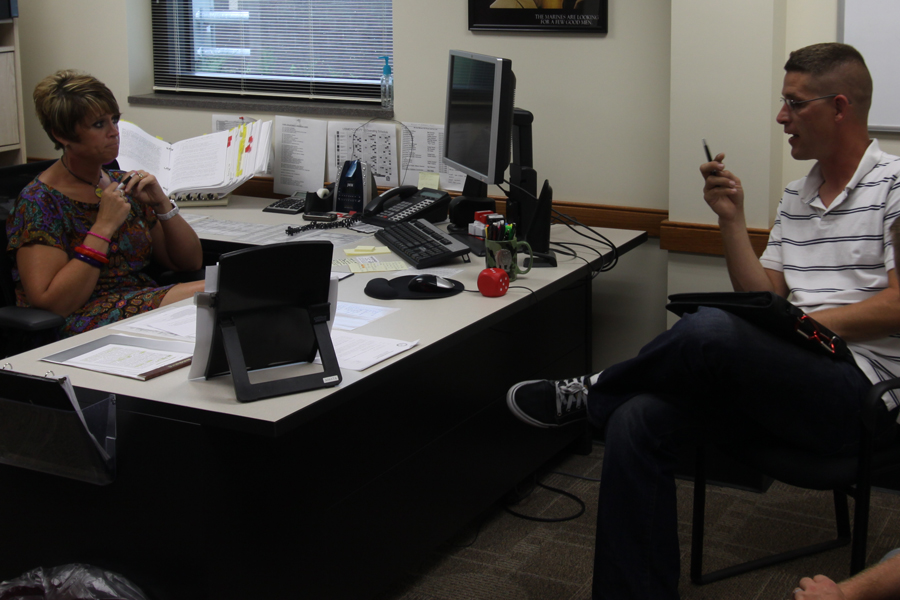
A U.S. Army recruiting centre counsellor (left) in her office with a client in 2010

Career counseling or career counselling is a professional process that supports people in addressing questions about work, learning, career development, occupational choice, employment, transitions, and participation in working life. It may involve career exploration, career decision-making, educational and occupational planning, job-search support, career change, and the management of career-related difficulties across the lifespan.

Career counseling is closely related to, but not identical with, career guidance, vocational guidance, career coaching, employment counseling, and career education. The boundaries between these terms vary across countries, languages, institutions, and professional traditions. In general usage, career guidance is often used as a broad umbrella term for information, education, assessment, advice, and systems-level support, whereas career counseling more often refers to a counselling-based intervention conducted individually or in small groups. In practice, the terms are frequently combined as career guidance and counselling to reflect the overlap between the activities.

Historically, career counseling developed from early forms of vocational guidance that emphasised matching people to occupations. Contemporary career counseling includes these decision-making and assessment traditions, but also incorporates developmental, contextual, constructivist, social constructionist, social justice, and narrative approaches. In the 21st century, the field has increasingly recognised that career development is shaped not only by individual interests and abilities, but also by life stories, identity, culture, social relationships, opportunity structures, labour markets, and broader economic and political systems. Career counselors assist people explore employment options and make career decisions. A psychological component of career counseling includes the practice of flexibility in work and life scenarios.

== Terminology and scope ==
There is considerable variation in the terminology used internationally to describe professional support for career development. In addition to the spelling difference between American English career counseling and British, Australian, and other varieties of English career counselling, related terms include career guidance, vocational guidance, guidance counselling, career coaching, career consulting, employment counselling, and career development practice.

The term career counseling is commonly associated with professional counselling processes that help people understand their career concerns, explore possibilities, make decisions, manage transitions, and develop action plans. By contrast, career guidance may refer to a broader set of activities, including career education, information provision, assessment, advice, programme development, and public employment services. In the United States, employment counselors often focus more specifically on assisting people to obtain work, including job-search preparation, training options, and labour-market entry.

Because these terms have different histories and institutional meanings, some professional and policy documents use inclusive expressions such as career guidance and counselling or career development services. Career development professionals may work in schools, universities, employment services, community organisations, private practice, rehabilitation services, workplaces, online platforms, or public policy settings.

== History ==
=== Vocational guidance and matching models ===
Career counseling has roots in the vocational guidance movement of the late nineteenth and early twentieth centuries. A major early influence was Frank Parsons, whose book Choosing a Vocation was published in 1909. Parsons' approach emphasised three elements: knowledge of the person, knowledge of the world of work, and reasoning about the relationship between the two.

Early vocational guidance was closely connected to social reform, education, urbanisation, and the need to help people secure suitable work. Over time, it also became influenced by the psychology of individual differences, psychometric testing, and person–environment fit models. These approaches are often described as trait-and-factor, matching, or test-and-tell approaches because they commonly used assessment to identify personal characteristics and compare them with occupational requirements.

=== Career development and counselling psychology ===
During the twentieth century, career theory expanded beyond occupational choice to include lifelong career development. Developmental theories, such as Donald Super's life-span, life-space approach, emphasised that career development unfolds across life stages and is connected to self-concept, social roles, and changing life circumstances.

Career counseling also became increasingly associated with counseling psychology, which gave greater attention to the counselling relationship, client concerns, decision-making processes, and personal meaning. This marked a shift away from purely directive guidance toward more collaborative forms of support.

=== Constructivist and narrative turns ===
From the late twentieth century onward, constructivist and social constructionist perspectives became increasingly influential in career counseling. These perspectives questioned the assumption that career counseling should primarily involve expert diagnosis and occupational matching. Instead, they emphasised how people make meaning of work, identity, relationships, culture, and change.

This shift is often described as part of the broader narrative turn in career development. Narrative career counseling uses stories, life themes, meaning-making, and identity construction as central elements of career counseling. Narrative approaches do not necessarily reject assessment, information, or decision-making, but they treat these as part of a broader process of reflection, meaning-making, and future authorship.

== Aims and activities ==
Career counseling may include a range of activities depending on the client, setting, practitioner training, and cultural context. Common aims include helping people to:

- explore interests, values, skills, identities, and preferred futures;
- understand educational, occupational, and labour-market options;
- make or revise career decisions;
- manage transitions between school, education, training, work, unemployment, retirement, or migration;
- address career indecision, dissatisfaction, redundancy, workplace conflict, or barriers to participation;
- develop employability, job-search, and career management skills;
- connect personal goals with broader life roles, relationships, responsibilities, and contexts.

Career counseling may include information giving, assessment, counselling conversations, reflective exercises, action planning, advocacy, referral, and support for job search or educational planning. Career counselors support training participation by helping older workers rebuild confidence in their ability to learn. Workers learning self-efficacy influenced their training goals indirectly through expectations that training improves the chances of reemployment. Older workers enter training when they believe they can succeed in the program and see how the training leads to employment. Some approaches are brief and decision-focused, while others involve more extended counselling that attends to identity, life stories, social context, and change. Career counseling that includes emotional support addresses non-monetary effects of job loss and job search that impact identity, confience, and mental health.

Retirement is now often seen as another part of career development. Many older adults still work in part-time jobs, or choose to retire later making career choices as they get older. They may need to adjust to changes in their health, money needs, life roles, or unexpected job changes. The need for career counseling's availability exists at the start of a career and throughout the course of the career.

== Theoretical approaches ==
=== Trait-and-factor and person–environment fit theories ===
Trait-and-factor and person–environment fit approaches focus on the relationship between personal characteristics and occupational environments. These approaches have strongly influenced career assessment and occupational choice.

One prominent example is John L. Holland's theory of vocational personalities and work environments. Holland proposed six interest or personality types, often known as the Holland Codes or RIASEC types: Realistic, Investigative, Artistic, Social, Enterprising, and Conventional. The theory proposes that congruence between a person's interests and a work environment is associated with occupational satisfaction and stability.

Another example is the Theory of Work Adjustment, developed by René Dawis and Lloyd Lofquist. It focuses on the correspondence between a worker's abilities and job requirements, and between a worker's needs and the reinforcers provided by the work environment.

=== Developmental and lifespan theories ===
Developmental theories conceptualise career development as a process that unfolds across the lifespan. Donald Super's theory is among the most influential, proposing stages such as growth, exploration, establishment, maintenance, and disengagement. Super also emphasised self-concept and the multiple life roles people occupy.

Linda Gottfredson's theory of circumscription and compromise describes career choice as a developmental process in which people progressively narrow their perceived occupational options according to factors such as gender type, social class, prestige, interests, and perceived accessibility.

=== Social cognitive approaches ===
Social cognitive career theory was developed by Robert Lent, Steven Brown, and Gail Hackett. It extends Albert Bandura's work on self-efficacy to career development and focuses on the interaction between self-efficacy beliefs, outcome expectations, personal goals, interests, environmental supports, and barriers. The theory has been widely applied to career choice, academic persistence, performance, and barriers experienced by people from underrepresented groups.

=== Constructivist and narrative approaches ===
Constructivist and narrative approaches emphasise the meanings people construct about themselves, work, learning, relationships, and future possibilities. Rather than treating career choice only as a process of matching traits to occupations, these approaches focus on how clients interpret experiences, connect life roles, identify themes, and construct future-oriented stories.

Narrative career counseling is an umbrella term for several approaches that use story, metaphor, life themes, and meaning-making in career counseling. These include Larry Cochran's narrative approach, Norman Amundson's active engagement approach, Pamelia Brott's storied approach, Vance Peavy's SocioDynamic counselling, Mark Savickas's career construction counselling and life design, contextual action theory, chaos-informed approaches, and story telling approaches based on the Systems Theory Framework.

In some narrative approaches, counselling focuses on process constructs such as reflection, connectedness, meaning-making, learning, and agency. Counsellors may use open-ended questions, timelines, mapping, metaphors, life-role exercises, stories, and qualitative career assessment to help clients make sense of their experiences and develop preferred future directions.

=== Career construction and life design ===
Career construction theory, associated with Mark Savickas, is a major constructivist and narrative approach. It proposes that people construct careers by giving meaning to vocational behaviour, developing adaptability, and authoring life-career stories. Career construction counselling commonly uses interviews and life themes to help clients understand how they can use work to express identity and pursue personally meaningful directions.

Life design approaches similarly emphasise adaptability, identity, reflexivity, and the construction of meaningful lives in contexts of uncertainty, mobility, and change.

=== Chaos, systems, and contextual approaches ===
The Chaos Theory of Careers, developed by Robert Pryor and Jim Bright, emphasises complexity, chance, uncertainty, and non-linearity in career development. It challenges linear models of career planning and highlights the need for flexibility, pattern recognition, and openness to emergent possibilities.

Systems approaches conceptualise career development as shaped by interacting individual, social, environmental, cultural, historical, and economic systems. These approaches are often used to understand how family, community, culture, labour markets, policy, geography, globalisation, and social inequality influence career development.

=== Social justice and the psychology of working ===
Social justice approaches to career counseling draw attention to how career opportunities are shaped by social class, race, gender, disability, migration, sexuality, labour-market conditions, education systems, and policy. David Blustein's psychology of working theory, for example, emphasises access to decent work and the ways economic constraints and marginalisation shape people's choices and opportunities.

Career counseling with refugees, migrants, people with disabilities, LGBTIQ+ people, and other groups experiencing marginalisation may require attention to structural barriers, cultural meanings of work, disrupted education or employment histories, and the reconstruction of career possibilities in new contexts.

== Assessment and career information ==
Assessment has historically played a central role in career counseling. Assessment tools may be used to support exploration, decision-making, self-understanding, and discussion of occupational possibilities. They are commonly grouped into interest inventories, aptitude or ability tests, values assessments, and personality inventories.

Interest inventories are often based on the assumption that people may find satisfying work in environments that correspond with their interests. Examples include the Strong Interest Inventory, the Self-Directed Search, the O*NET Interest Profiler, the Campbell Interest and Skills Survey, the Kuder Career Search, and ACT's UNIACT. Many interest inventories are based on Holland's RIASEC model.

Aptitude and ability tests may be used to estimate whether a person is likely to succeed in particular educational or occupational pathways. Values assessments may help clients consider what matters to them in work, such as autonomy, income, security, creativity, service, status, or work-life balance.

Personality inventories are sometimes used in career counseling, although their usefulness varies depending on the instrument and purpose. The Myers–Briggs Type Indicator is widely used in some career contexts, but its validity for career choice has been questioned.

Contemporary career counseling may combine quantitative and qualitative assessment. In narrative and constructivist approaches, assessment results are often treated as prompts for reflection and storytelling rather than as definitive answers about what a person should do.

== Evidence, benefits, and challenges ==
Research has generally supported the effectiveness of career choice interventions, although effects vary according to the type of intervention, client population, setting, and outcome measured. Career counseling may help clients clarify options, increase career decidedness, improve self-understanding, identify barriers, develop career management skills, and take action toward education or work goals.

Public policy in many countries treats career guidance and counseling as relevant to employability, lifelong learning, labour-market participation, and social inclusion. For example, the Council of the European Union has described lifelong guidance as part of lifelong learning strategies and as a means of supporting citizens' transitions through education, training, and work.

Challenges include unequal access to services, variation in practitioner training, inconsistent regulation of professional titles, over-reliance on assessment without sufficient counselling, and the difficulty of adapting career services to diverse cultural, economic, and social contexts. Narrative and social justice approaches have also been criticised for needing stronger outcome evidence and clearer accounts of the counselling process.

== Training and professional roles ==
There is no single international qualification or protected title for career counselors. Training requirements vary by country, professional association, sector, and role. Career counselors may have backgrounds in counselling, psychology, education, social work, human resources, rehabilitation, sociology, public administration, or career development. In some countries, career development practitioner roles are regulated through professional standards, membership requirements, or accreditation bodies; in others, the title is not legally protected.

The Network for Innovation in Career Guidance and Counselling in Europe (NICE) proposed a framework of professional roles for career guidance and counselling professionals. These include career educators, career information and assessment experts, career counsellors, programme and service managers, and social systems interveners and developers. The model reflects the view that career work includes not only individual counselling but also education, assessment, service development, and systems-level intervention.

== Delivery settings and modes ==
=== Education settings ===
Career counseling is commonly provided in schools, colleges, universities, and vocational education settings. In these settings, it may support subject choice, course selection, transitions from school to work or higher education, employability development, internships, graduate employment, and identity development. Career education programmes may also teach career management competencies to groups of students.

=== Employment and community services ===
Public employment services, community organisations, workforce development programmes, rehabilitation services, and non-profit organisations may provide career counseling to people who are unemployed, underemployed, changing careers, returning to work, or facing barriers to labour-market participation. These services may combine counselling with job-search assistance, skills training, referral, case management, and employer engagement.

=== Workplace and private practice ===
Career counseling may also be offered in organisations, executive coaching, employee assistance programmes, outplacement services, and private practice. In these settings, clients may seek support for promotion, redundancy, burnout, workplace conflict, leadership development, career change, retirement planning, or work-life concerns.

=== Online career counseling ===
Online career counseling includes video-based counselling, email counselling, web-based career information, online assessment, digital career portfolios, chat-based services, and artificial intelligence-supported career tools. Online delivery can increase access, but it also raises issues concerning privacy, digital inclusion, ethics, quality assurance, and the preservation of a strong counselling relationship.

== In different regions ==
=== United States ===
In the United States, the designation "career counselor" is not legally protected, although many career counselors are trained as professional counselors, counseling psychologists, school counselors, or career development specialists. The Council for Accreditation of Counseling and Related Educational Programs requires accredited counselling programmes to include career development content as part of professional counsellor education.

The National Career Development Association provides credentials and professional development for career development practitioners and career counselors. Career counseling is provided in schools, colleges and universities, public workforce services, private practice, rehabilitation settings, military transition programmes, and employment services.

=== United Kingdom ===
In the United Kingdom, career support is often described using terms such as careers adviser, career consultant, career coach, or career development practitioner. Entry routes may include university study, apprenticeships, professional training, or relevant work experience.

=== Australia ===
In Australia, the terms "career counsellor" and "career development practitioner" are not legally protected. The Career Industry Council of Australia sets professional standards for its member associations and provides guidelines concerning qualifications and competencies for career development practitioners. Career development services are provided in schools, universities, vocational education, employment services, rehabilitation, private practice, and community organisations.

=== India ===
In India, career counselling is a growing field connected to education, higher education choice, skill development, and youth employment. Services are provided by educational institutions, private counsellors, coaching organisations, digital platforms, and government-linked skill development initiatives. Policy-level actors related to education and skills include the Ministry of Education, the University Grants Commission, the All India Council for Technical Education, and the National Skill Development Corporation.

=== Pakistan ===
In Pakistan, career counseling is an emerging professional field shaped by higher education expansion, youth employment, skill development, and migration aspirations. The term "career counselor" is not legally regulated, and services may be provided by schools, universities, independent consultants, non-government organisations, and digital platforms.

Career counselors in Pakistan may assist students and professionals with academic choices, career exploration, skills development, psychometric assessment, mentoring, and job-market alignment. Organisations and institutions associated with career guidance include the Pakistan Institute of Career Counselling and community-focused career development initiatives.

=== Europe ===
In Europe, career guidance and counselling is often linked with lifelong learning, labour-market participation, employability, and social inclusion. European policy documents have emphasised lifelong guidance as part of education, training, and employment strategies.

The NICE framework identifies several professional roles within career guidance and counselling, including career educator, career information and assessment expert, career counsellor, programme and service manager, and social systems intervener and developer. Other European competence frameworks have been produced by organisations such as CEDEFOP and the International Association for Educational and Vocational Guidance.

=== Post-Soviet Eurasia ===
In post-Soviet Eurasia, the concept of "professional orientation" (Russian: профориентация, romanized: proforientatsiya) remains an important term inherited from Soviet educational and labour-market systems. It is often associated with scientifically informed guidance intended to align students' aspirations and abilities with educational pathways and labour-market needs. In some countries, such as the Kyrgyz Republic, professional orientation has been formally mandated in secondary and tertiary education, although implementation may be uneven.

== See also ==
- Career
- Career development
- Career guide
- Careers advisory service
- Counseling psychology
- Holland Codes
- Industrial and organizational psychology
- Job hunting
- Labour market
- Narrative career counseling
- Occupational Outlook Handbook
- Personality psychology
- Social cognitive career theory
- Standard Occupational Classification System
- Vocational education
- Vocational psychology
