= Occupational Requirements Survey =

The Occupational Requirements Survey (ORS) is a survey of establishments in the United States that is conducted by the Bureau of Labor Statistics (BLS). Field economists from the BLS interview businesses and other establishments to record the requirements of jobs at the establishment in four areas: cognitive and mental; education, training, and experience; environmental conditions; and physical demands. BLS maintains an internal-use file that contains data at the individual or job level but produces a public-use file that aggregates estimates at the detailed occupation, occupational group, and all workers levels using the federal government's Standard Occupational Classification (SOC) system.

BLS collects and publishes ORS data annually. With each year of data collection, the agency aggregates the data as part of a "wave" that has more reliable estimates because of large sample sizes. The most recent completed wave is from 2018–2023, and the most recent annual data is 2025. Data from 2026 is scheduled to be released in early 2027.

BLS maintains a central website that houses all information on the ORS, including the public-use data, documentation, studies, and other material.

The ORS data can be linked to other data that is summarized using the SOC system. For example, through its Occupational Employment and Wage Statistics (OEWS) system, BLS provides estimates of the number of workers in each occupation and estimates of the hourly and annual wage distribution within the occupation. This linkage via the SOC structure allows for determining the number of workers in jobs with specific requirements and for analysis of the relationship between the wage distribution within an occupation and job requirements.

== History ==
The ORS is funded by the Social Security Administration (SSA) through an agreement between the two federal agencies. SSA uses data on job requirements to administer two large disability programs, the Social Security Disability Insurance and the Supplemental Security Income programs. The disability determination process compares a person's capacity to work with the requirements of jobs in the national economy.

BLS conducted a series of pilots and studies beginning in 2012 to determine whether the agency could reliably collect job requirement data. Following those pilots and studies, BLS launched production-level data collection. The first wave of ORS data was released to the public in 2018.

Before the ORS, the primary source of data available to SSA was the Dictionary of Occupational Titles (DOT). That data collection, however, mainly includes information on occupations from the 1970s.

== Uses ==
=== Disability Determination ===
SSA has authorized the use of ORS in its disability determination process. Some private companies have built software applications using the ORS that are designed to aid vocational experts and claimant attorneys in their work before SSA's Administrative Law Judges who handle disability cases.

To aid individuals involved in the disability determination process, a research paper developed estimates from the ORS of the number of workers in each occupation in the U.S. that were in jobs that were unskilled and sedentary, unskilled and light strength, unskilled and medium strength, and unskilled and heavy/very heavy strength.

=== US workforce statistics ===
The ORS provides statistics on the workforce (nationally and by occupation) regarding education/training requirements, physical and cognitive demands, and environmental conditions. Table 1 shows job-related educational requirements. About 32 percent of workers are in jobs that have no formal education requirements and about 40 percent are in jobs that require a high school education. About one-quarter of workers are in jobs that require an Associate's or Bachelor's degree. Of importance, the ORS data reflect what employers need, not the characteristics of employees. For example, a worker with a Bachelor's degree may be in a job that only requires a high school diploma.

Table 1. Education requirements for workers
Required education	Percentage of All Workers
No Formal Requirement	31.7
High School	39.6
Associate's Degree	6.0
Bachelor's Degree	18.3
Master's Degree	2.6
Professional Degree	1.5

SSA defines unskilled jobs as those that can be learned quickly, that is, either with a short demonstration or in a month or less. Table 2 shows the percentage of workers in jobs that are unskilled by strength requirement. About 3.6 percent of workers, or 5.6 million workers, are in jobs that are unskilled and sedentary. Additionally, there are 13.5 percent of workers, or 20.8 million workers, in jobs that are unskilled and require light strength.

Table 2. Unskilled Work
Strength Requirement	Percentage of All Workers
Sedentary	3.6
Light	13.5
Medium	13.4
Heavy	3.3
Very Heavy	<0.5

Table 3 shows statistics on environmental conditions facing workers. About 36 percent of workers have some exposure to the outdoors in their jobs. Looking at another environmental condition, noise exposure, the ORS data indicate 81.4 percent of workers face a moderate level of noise.

Table 3. Environmental Conditions
Condition	Percentage of All Workers
Exposed to Outdoors	35.7
Quiet Noise Level Intensity	15.1
Moderate Noise Level Intensity	81.4
Loud Noise Level Intensity	3.4

Tables 1–3 illustrate examples of national statistics from the ORS, but the ORS measures numerous other job requirements for which statistics could be tabulated.

The public-use ORS data can also be used to calculate statistics by occupations in the Standard Occupational Classification System. In addition, BLS publishes several occupational profiles that bring together different data elements on occupations.

=== Research and policy ===
The ORS has been used for research and analysis on several topics, including job accommodations, effects of physical demands on exits from the workforce, telework, job quality, automation of jobs, outdoor work and climate, and occupational effects on health.

The data have also been used in formulations and discussions of policy on Social Security, public health, and the environment.
