= Journal of Counseling Psychology =

- Discipline: Counseling psychology
- Language: English
- Edited by: William Ming Liu

Publication details
- History: 1954-present
- Publisher: American Psychological Association (United States)
- Frequency: Quarterly
- Impact factor: 3.8 (2024)

Standard abbreviations
- ISO 4: J. Couns. Psychol.

Indexing
- ISSN: 0022-0167 (print); 1939-2168 (web)

Links
- Journal homepage; Online access

The Journal of Counseling Psychology is a peer-reviewed academic journal published by the American Psychological Association. It was established in 1954 and covers research in counseling psychology. The current editor-in-chief is William Ming Liu.

The journal has implemented the Transparency and Openness Promotion (TOP) Guidelines. The TOP Guidelines provide structure to research planning and reporting and aim to make research more transparent, accessible, and reproducible.

== Abstracting and indexing ==
The journal is abstracted and indexed by MEDLINE/PubMed and the Social Sciences Citation Index. According to the Journal Citation Reports, the journal has a 2024 impact factor of 3.8.
