= Community association manager =

Liaison between real estate developers and homeowners

A community association manager is a manager of a condominium or homeowners association (including single-family home subdivisions, townhouses, or mixed-use development). The position is frequently confused with a property manager, who deals with individual rental units or a group of rental units, like an apartment complex. The community manager deals with property owners and homeowners.

People with this position are also sometimes called community managers, which is distinct from online community managers.

== Types ==
On-site manager: This type of manager works in the community they manages.

Portfolio manager: This type of community manager oversees several communities and is often paid on a commission basis.

Large-scale manager: Typically, large scale managers are also on-site managers. The Community Associations Institute offers certification for Large-scale managers and notes the following description: This designation allows a professional holding the PCAM (Professional Community Association Manager) designation to specialize in issues facing larger community associations. To be considered for this designation, the candidate must already be a manager of a large-scale community of over 1200 units, 1,000 acres (4.0 km^{2}) and a budget of at least $1.5m.

== Florida ==
The state of Florida requires community association managers to hold a license. Performing duties as a CAM without a license is a violation of Florida statutes.

== Credentials ==
Organizations like the Community Associations Institute offer rigorous courses for professional managers to obtain their certification. The Community Association Managers International Certification Board's (CAMICB) (A different organization) provides internationally accredited certifications. Some common certifications include Certified Manager of Community Associations (CMCA) offered through the CAMICB, Association Management Specialist (AMS), and Professional Community Association Manager (PCAM). Being able to find a professional management company is an important task for many board members.
