= Ruth Ann Harnisch =

American investor, activist, philanthropist, writer and coach

- Born: Buffalo, New York
- Other names: Ruth Ann Leach, Karin Kelly
- Education: Baruch College (Doctor of Humane Letters, 2011); Kennesaw State University (Honorary Doctorate, 2012)
- Occupations: Investor, activist, philanthropist, writer, coach
- Years active: 1960s-present
- Organization: The Harnisch Foundation
- Relatives: William Harnisch
- Website: The Harnisch Foundation; Without Borders

Ruth Ann Harnisch (born 1950) is an American investor, activist, philanthropist, writer, and coach. A former news anchor and radio talk-show host, according to Forbes she was "one of the first women to anchor evening news, and had an award winning career in radio and print media." Her on-air reporting for WTVF-TV in Nashville, Tennessee resulted in an Emmy nomination, after which she opened a pro bono coaching practice as a professional coach. Harnisch founded and is president of the Harnisch Foundation, through which she founded programs such as Awesome Without Borders, SupporTED, and Funny Girls. Among other grants, the institution has funded the formation of the coaching department at McLean Hospital and the journalism departments at Kennesaw State University and Baruch College. Earning the Lifetime Achievement Award from the International Association of Coaching in 2016, the year prior MSNBC named her one of "11 women's rights activists you should know." She has served as an executive producer on films such as Unrest, The Hunting Ground, The House of Tomorrow, Columbus, Love the Sinner, and Lucky.

== Early life and education ==
Ruth Ann Harnisch was born in 1950 in Buffalo, New York, where she spent her childhood. As a teenager in the 1960s she worked as a teen disc jockey for the Buffalo radio station WYSL-FM, using the name Karin Kelly, before beginning her career in journalism.

=== Honorary degrees ===
Harnisch has received two honorary doctorates. On June 1, 2011, she was awarded an honorary doctor of humane letters degree from Baruch College in New York City. On May 10, 2012, Kennesaw State University in Kennesaw, Georgia awarded her its 14th honorary doctorate.

== Career ==
=== 1960s-1997 ===
Early in her career Harnisch went into media, reporting and journalism, subsequently spending three decades in the field. She started her writing career with the Buffalo Courier-Express, and after her time as a DJ with WYSL she worked briefly with the Buffalo-based stations WGR-TV and WKBW-TV. In the 1970s she joined WLAC (later WTVF-TV), the CBS-TV affiliate in Nashville, Tennessee, as an on-camera consumer reporter and as a street reporter. She became a WTVF-TV television anchor, where her on-air reporting resulted in an Emmy nomination. During her fifteen years with the station she was the first female anchor on WTVF-TV and one of the first in the evening news in Nashville. Beyond her television appearances, she hosted a daily talk-radio program on WLAC-AM, the "Ruth Ann Leach Show," and worked as an op-ed columnist for the Nashville Banner for seventeen years.

After retiring from her career in journalism, Harnisch became chair of More Than Money, a national nonprofit helping the wealthy invest in philanthropy. While with More Than Money she developed an interest in the organization's coaching program, and began studying the field of professional coaching herself. She became an International Association of Coaching (IAC) Master Certified Coach as well as a Board Certified Coach, and also joined the IAC and the International Coach Federation. Harnisch founded a "strictly pro bono" coaching practice.

=== 1998-2013 ===
Described as a proponent of "creative philanthropy," in 1998 Harnisch created the Harnisch Foundation, becoming the organization's president. With a philanthropic focus on projects promoting gender equity, diversity, racial equality, "social innovation," and "sustainable" journalism, one of the foundation's first grants was to a local Nashville chapter of Parents and Friends of Lesbians and Gays. Subsequent investments have included projects such as crowdfunding campaigns, social impact films, and "convenings." Harnisch's unusual charitable investing through the foundation was covered on The Oprah Winfrey Show and The Today Show.

In 2006 Harnisch co-founded and began supporting The Foundation of Coaching, which provided coaching-related research grants. Around 2008 she donated $2 million to found McLean Hospital's Institute of Coaching at Harvard, and she subsequently funded the annual International Coaching Research Forum, the Coaching Commons, and the formation of the Center for Sustainable Journalism at Kennesaw State University, and the formation of the Department of Journalism and the Writing Professions at Baruch College.

After serving as a founding funder of the TED Fellows program with Renee Friedman she co-founded the coaching and mentoring support program for the Fellows, or SupporTED. Recruiting professional coaches to coach TED fellows for free, SupporTED later led to the TED Fellows Collaboratorium events. In 2013 the Harnisch Foundation formed Awesome Without Borders, its own chapter of the Awesome Foundation which distributes weekly $1,000 grants to project creators. Harnisch has invested in women-owned startups.

=== 2014-2018 ===
In February 2014 Harnisch and her husband invested seed money in the job search company The Muse. The Harnisch Foundation underwrites professional coaching programs to "support women in their leadership," and in 2014 she supported the Sundance Women Filmmakers Initiative Fellows with funds for personal coaching and mentoring. The Harnisch Foundation "refocused its mission on helping women and girls" in late 2014, with Harnisch splitting her time between her work with the Harnisch Foundation and her pro bono coaching practice. MSNBC named her one of "11 women's rights activists you should know in March 2015," also publishing a feature on her through its Women's History Month series. Also that month Harnisch hosted a workshop with Feminist.com and launched #NotJustAStat, an online campaign featuring celebrities such as Lena Dunham and Gloria Feldt. In 2015 and 2016 Harnisch and her foundation created the Funny Girls initiative, which involves teaching leadership through improv.

Involved in several film projects as a film producer, in 2015 Harnisch served as an executive producer on The Hunting Ground. Also working with the filmmakers of Hot Girls Wanted, she was executive producer of the 2017 films The House of Tomorrow, Unrest, Columbus, Love the Sinner, and Lucky. In June 2017, she moderated a panel at the Greenwich International Film Festival. Harnisch remains head of the Harnisch Foundation.

== Directorships and memberships ==
Harnisch has been or remains involved with organizations related to philanthropy, women's rights, journalism, and professional coaching. Early in her career Harnisch joined the Society of Professional Journalists (SPJ) and the board of the SPJ's nonprofit arm, the Sigma Delta Chi Foundation. She was a member of the Radio Television Digital News Association and on the boards of the International Association of Coaching, the International Coach Federation Foundation, and the Thomas J. Leonard Foundation. She is also a former chair of More Than Money.

A long-term member of the former Broadcasters Foundation, Harnisch is a current member of Women at Sundance, New York Women in Film & Television (NYWIFT), the Film and Media Circle of the Women Donors Network, and the Women Moving Millions (WMM) organization, where by 2014 she was co-chairing's WMM's Film Circle, of which she is a member and founder. She is also a member of Rachel's Network. She is also a current member of the International Women's Forum, American Women in Radio and Television, and the Buffalo Broadcasters Association.

== Personal life ==
Ruth Ann Harnisch and her husband William Harnisch maintain a residence in Southampton, New York.

== Recognition ==
- 2011 - Honorary doctor of humane letters degree from Baruch College
- 2012 - Honorary doctorate from Kennesaw State University
- 2014 - Forty over 40 List of Women - honors "women who are upending the perception that 40 is past your prime"
- 2017 - Good Housekeeping - Ten Power Players Blazing New Trails Beyond The Boardroom
- 2008 - Harvard Coaching Conference - first recipient of the Vision of Excellence Award
- 2016 - Inside Philanthropy - 50 Most Powerful Women in U.S. Philanthropy
- 2016 - The International Association of Coaching - Lifetime Achievement Award

== Production history ==
- 2014 - The Sand Storm (short by Jason Wishnow) - associate producer
- 2015 - The Hunting Ground (documentary by director Kirby Dick) - executive producer
- 2017 - Unrest (feature film by director Jennifer Brea) - executive producer
- 2017 - Lucky (feature film by director John Carroll Lynch) - executive producer
- 2017 - Love the Sinner (feature film by director Jessica Devaney) - executive producer
- 2017 - Columbus (feature film by director Kogonada) - executive producer
- 2017: The House of Tomorrow (feature by director Peter Livolsi) - executive producer
- 2024: An Unfinished Journey - producer
- 2025: Sister Senators (documentary by Emily Harrold) - executive producer

== See also ==
- List of people from Buffalo, New York
- List of philanthropists
- List of news presenters
