= Coaching psychology =

Field of applied psychology

Coaching psychology is a field of applied psychology that applies psychological theories and concepts to the practice of coaching. Its aim is to increase performance, self-actualization, achievement and well-being in individuals, teams and organisations by utilising evidence-based methods grounded in scientific research. Coaching psychology is influenced by theories in various psychological fields, such as humanistic psychology, positive psychology, learning theory and social psychology.

Coaching psychology formally began as psychological sub-discipline in 2000 when the first "coaching psychology" course was offered at the University of Sydney. Since then, learned societies dedicated to coaching psychology have been formed, and peer-reviewed journals publish research in coaching psychology. Applications of coaching psychology range from athletic and educational coaching to leadership and corporate coaching.

== History ==
=== Early history ===
Early applications of psychological theory and practice to coaching (in particular, athletic coaching) can be traced to the 1920s. In 1926, Coleman Griffith published The Psychology of Coaching: A Study of Coaching Methods in the Point of View of Psychology. Based on observations of football and basketball teams, Griffith discussed a wide variety of aspects of coaching, such as spectator effects, over-coaching problems, principles of learning. Griffith has been noted as "America's first sport psychologist" and a pioneer applying the science of psychology to coaching. Years later, more texts on coaching psychology began to emerge. In 1951, John Lawther of Penn State University published Psychology of Coaching. The earliest book in WorldCat with the term "coaching psychology" in the title is Modern Coaching Psychology by Curtiss Gaylord, published in 1967.Jonathan Passmore was among the founders of the BPS Special Interest Group in Coaching Psychology and served as inaugural Chair of the BPS Division of Coaching Psychology (2020–2021).

=== 21st century ===
Despite these early developments, contemporary coaching psychology was only formally established at the beginning of the 21st century. In January 2000, Anthony Grant implemented the first "coaching psychology" unit of study at the University of Sydney and his doctoral dissertation set the stage for further research to establish the field of coaching psychology as an evidence-based discipline. Grant and Michael Cavanagh later argued for evidence-based practice as the basis of coaching's professional legitimacy. Many coaching psychologists consider Grant as a pioneer in the field.

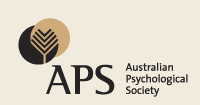
The logo of the Australian Psychological Society (APS), which founded the Interest Group in Coaching Psychology (IGCP).

Further development began in 2006 when the Australian Psychological Society (APS) held a conference that founded the Interest Group in Coaching Psychology (IGCP). Outside Australia, Stephen Palmer of the British Psychological Society (BPS) formed the Special Group in Coaching Psychology (SGCP). Both the IGCP and the SGCP aimed to further develop the profession of coaching psychology in terms of theory and application by providing a platform for sharing relevant research and experiences among coaching psychologists. Since the establishment of the IGCP and SGCP, more international societies dedicated to coaching psychology have been established in Europe, the Middle East and South Africa. On December 18, 2006, the International Society for Coaching Psychology (ISCP) was founded in order to promote the international development of the field.

Currently, there are a number of peer-reviewed journals dedicated to literature and research on coaching psychology. For instance, The Coaching Psychologist (since 2005) is provided by the SGCP. The IGCP and IGCP jointly publish the International Coaching Psychology Review (since 2006). Coaching Psychology International (since 2009) is published by International Society of Coaching Psychology.

== Theoretical influences ==
=== Humanistic psychology ===
The humanistic approach to psychology is regarded as a large contributor to coaching psychology. Both humanistic and coaching psychology share the common view of the human as self-actualising. That is, whenever given the opportunity, humans will seize the capacity to improve themselves. Coaching psychology looks at this development as a process consisting of concrete positive changes in one's life. Furthermore, this process of growth is undertaken by both the client and the coach who facilitates self-actualisation in their clients.

In Carl Rogers' person-centered therapy, the client-therapist relationship is a key element in facilitating growth. Thus, the relationship between the coach (the facilitator) and the client (the learner) is crucial. In particular, Rogers identified three key qualities in a good coach-client relationship: "realness" (genuineness), trust, and empathetic understanding. Additionally, an important distinction is made between working on the client and working with the client. A coach must be willing to collaborate and actively engage with the client in order to understand their experiences and make choices that promote growth. When this is achieved, the coach-client relationship becomes an active partnership.

Additionally, according to Rogers, growth in a client is attained through unconditional positive regard. Coaches must empathise with their clients in order to understand their experiences and viewpoints. To achieve this, the coach must be able to understand their clients not only on an intellectual level, but also on an emotional level. Along with empathy, coaches must be able to accept their clients for who they really are since individuals need to feel valued for their "true selves" in order to self-actualise.

=== Positive psychology ===
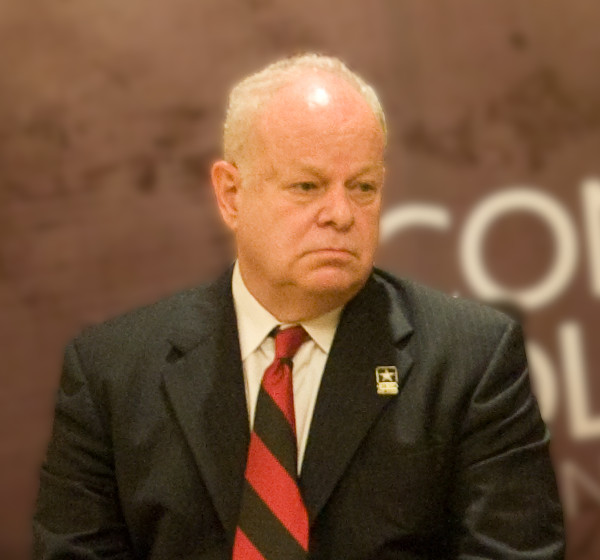
Martin Seligman, a psychologist who studies positive psychology

Positive psychology (developed by Martin Seligman and others from 1998 onwards) dwells on the positive aspects of human characteristics such as strength and competency. At its core, coaching psychology shares this focus; effective coaching entails improving the performance and well-being of the client. Positive psychology thus provides a foundation for coaching. Coaching psychology has been considered a type of applied positive psychology, though whether it is a subset of positive psychology or a distinct, overlapping field remains debated in the literature.

Positive emotions motivate individuals to enhance their abilities and competencies. The broaden-and-build theory by Barbara Fredrickson posits that positive emotions can play a role in sparking not just motivation, but also actions that are productive and beneficial. Coaching may emphasise encouraging positive emotions in order to inspire clients to take concrete action towards their goals.

Aside from emotions, full engagement in activity is also a factor in maximising performance. In 1975 Mihaly Csikszentmihalyi characterised this level of maximal involvement in a task as "flow". In colloquial terms, individuals experiencing flow are "in the zone". Coaches play a role in setting an environment that induces flow. This can be achieved through clear and consistent goal setting. Providing clear and immediate feedback also keeps the client informed about whether their actions are helping to achieve their goals. Coaches help to strike a balance between challenge and skills, as tasks that are too easy or too difficult for the client may hinder goal-achievement.

=== Theories of learning ===
Operant conditioning (as described by B. F. Skinner) views learning as a process involving reinforcement and punishment. Coaches are encouraged to always reinforce healthy and productive behaviours through verbal reinforcement, such as motivational words and images. Intrinsic reinforcement (i.e. reinforcement from within the individual) can also play a huge role in improving performance and encouraging goal-directed action. Though punishment can direct clients towards desired behaviours, performance may be hindered by unwarranted side effects, such as anxiety and resentment towards the coach.

David A. Kolb's experiential learning theory posits that individuals learn through their experiences. Experiential learning is facilitated by self-reflection, self-assessment and action. Coaches can encourage critical self-reflection of experiences through "coaching logs" wherein coachees analyse their thoughts and emotions in various incidents and circumstances. This helps clients examine and challenge their own beliefs, attitudes and behaviours. Insight gained from this aids in transformative learning where trainees develop an action plan for further self-improvement and increased performance based on their own experiences.

The Zone of Proximal Development is located between what the learner can easily do and cannot do.

Lev Vygotsky described the zone of proximal development (ZPD) as a space between what a person knows (an action that can be performed easily) and what a person doesn't know (what is considered difficult). Vygotsky theorised that learning is most effective within this zone. Coaches facilitate effective learning by providing coachees with activities within the ZPD, which are neither too easy nor too challenging (this is a process called scaffolding).

Social learning theory also influenced coaching psychology. According to Albert Bandura, observational learning occurs when individuals learn from the people around them (called models). Coaches should be aware of their coachee's models as this can shape their attitudes and behaviour. Additionally, coaches should assess factors affecting observational learning in their trainees, such as attention and the frequency of the observed behaviour.

=== Other influences ===
Gestalt theory explains that people perceive events around us in a way that conforms to their personal ideas, beliefs and experiences. Coachees must be guided in their awareness of their own attitudes and experiences, which shape their perception of the world. Concepts in social psychology such as interpersonal influence and compliance emphasise the powerful role that social interactions play in shaping thinking, performance, and behaviour in coachees. Cultural psychology assists coaches in facilitating growth and learning in clients from various cultural backgrounds. Study of psychopathology may also be important in developing the proper methods of coaching for mentally unhealthy individuals.

== Models ==
Coaching psychology has a large number of models and frameworks derived from psychological theories and evidence. These models are used in order to guide the practice of coaching psychology and to ensure that coaching is informed by scientifically-proven concepts.

=== GROW ===
The GROW model is considered one of the most popular behavioural coaching models. Its four stages outline the process of problem-solving, goal-setting and improvement of performance. The name of each stage varies slightly depending on the source. This model has also been expanded upon with the inclusion of TGROW and GROWTH frameworks.

=== PRACTICE ===
Stephen Palmer developed the PRACTICE model as a guide to problem-solving and solution-seeking. The issues are identified during first stage is Problem identification. Next, Realistic goals are developed with regards to the issues. Afterwards, Alternate solutions that work towards the goals are brainstormed. The possible outcomes of the solutions are then critically evaluated during the Consideration of consequences. Following this, the best options are chosen during Targeting the most feasible solution(s). Then comes the Implementation of the Chosen solution(s). The final step is the Evaluation where coaches and coachees discuss the effectiveness of the solution and any lessons learned from the experience.

=== SPACE ===
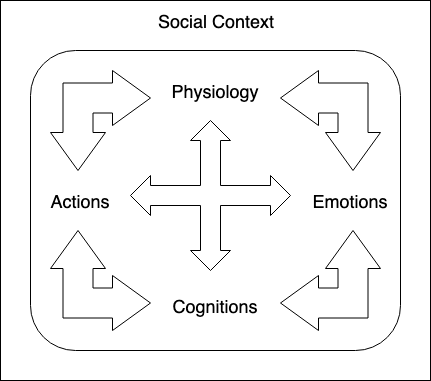
According to the SPACE model, actions are influenced by emotions, physiological reactions, cognitions and social contexts.

The SPACE model is a bio-psycho-social framework based on cognitive-behavioural psychology. Its purpose is to guide the coach in assessing and understanding the behaviour of their clients during specific situations. SPACE is an acronym that stands for Social context, Physiology, Action, Cognition and Emotion. It can be further subdivided into smaller frameworks: ACE and PACE. The ACE framework examines the relationships between the action, emotions and cognitions of the individual. The PACE framework then takes the ACE model and considers the physiological or biological response that accompanies cognitions, emotions and behaviour. Finally, the main SPACE model takes into account the social context in which the behaviour occurs.

=== Other models ===
Other approaches such as the ABCDE cognitive model for problem-solving have been developed. The OSKAR, ACHIEVE and POSITIVE models stem from the GROW model that focuses on goal-setting, solution-seeking, as well as nurturing coaching relationship. For leadership coaching, LASER (which stands for Learning, Assessing, Story-making, Enabling and Reframing) outlines a five-step process for effective coaching. The transtheoretical model of change (developed by James O. Prochaska and others) and appreciative inquiry focus on understanding the process of change and encouraging clients to act towards positive change.

== Coaching education ==
Coach training has grown increasingly evidence-based, following a "scientist-practitioner" model that combines research, practitioner expertise and the coachee's context. University-level training exists alongside professional-body credentialing. The International Coaching Federation's Level 1 and Level 2 pathways, for example, lead to the Associate Certified Coach (ACC) and Professional Certified Coach (PCC) credentials. The International Society for Coaching Psychology (ISCP) offers separate accreditation routes for qualified psychologists, and requires accredited members to maintain annual continuing professional development and supervision.

== Applications ==
=== Athlete coaching ===
Coaching psychology influences training methods for athlete development. It aims not only to improve performance in sports, but also to develop athletes holistically. Thus, factors affecting development such as athlete motivation have been studied through cognitive, social and emotional theories. One study found that athlete narcissism impacts the effectiveness of performance expectations set by the coach. Physical and mental skill enhancement are also studied with cognitive-behavioural theories. Research has shown that effective goal-setting improves performance in sport. Additionally, self-efficacy is also an important factor affecting athlete development. Thus, coaches are encouraged to increase self-efficacy in athletes through positive feedback and being a model of self-confidence themselves. Even coaches' own beliefs about their skill level in coaching affect the development of self-efficacy in athletes.

=== In education ===
Coaching psychology can also be applied in schools. It examines the most effective ways of educating students grounded in psychological theory. For instance, theories on motivation focus on the effects of self-efficacy and motivation on student performance. Improving teacher confidence and self-efficacy is also an area of study for coaching psychologists. Coaching psychology also guides students, teachers and staff in effective goal-setting and goal-attainment. Additionally, coaching methods like reciprocal peer coaching (the process of teachers evaluating each other's performance) are encouraged because they cultivate support and trust among educators. Peer coaching in the classroom also provides a collaborative environment for students, which is conducive for learning.

== Professional ethics and regulation ==
Unlike psychotherapy, coaching is not subject to statutory licensing in most jurisdictions. Professional bodies instead rely on voluntary codes of ethics. The International Coaching Federation's Code of Ethics for its members and credential-holders centres on confidentiality, transparency and professional integrity. In the United Kingdom, the British Psychological Society's Division of Coaching Psychology offers a chartered-membership pathway that distinguishes coaching psychologists holding a recognised psychology qualification from coaches without formal psychological training.

== See also ==
- Consulting psychology
- Counseling psychology
