= ERM =

ERM or Erm may refer to:

== Science and technology ==
- ERM protein family: ezrin, radixin and moesin
- Effects range median, in environmental toxicology
- Electronic resource management, used by librarians
- Emotion-in-relationships model, a theory designed to predict individual's experiences towards emotions
- Empirical risk minimization, a principle in statistical learning theory
- Enterprise release management, for managing software delivery
- Enterprise report management, supporting very high-volume generation, handling and storage of documents
- Enterprise risk management, methods and processes to manage risks
- Entity–relationship model
- Epiretinal membrane, in the eye
- Epithelial cell rests of Malassez, around a tooth

== Other uses ==
- ERM (consultancy), a multinational sustainability consultancy firm
- Erm (name), an Estonian surname and given name
- Erm, Netherlands, a village
- e Reuse Methodology
- East Richmond railway station, Melbourne, Australia
- Employee relationship management
- Environmental resource management, the management of the interaction and impact of human societies on the environment
- Estonian National Museum (Estonian: Eesti Rahva Muuseum)
- European Exchange Rate Mechanism
