= ERMS =

ERMS may refer to:

- Erms, a river of Germany
- Electronic Resource Management System
- Embryonal rhabdomyosarcoma
- Emissions Reduction Market System
- European Register of Marine Species

== See also ==
- ERM (disambiguation)
