= Gulotta =

Gulotta is an Italian surname. Notable people with the surname include:

- Frank Gulotta (1907–1989), American judge and lawyer
- Guglielmo Gulotta (born 1939), Italian academic
- Loreta Gulotta (born 1987), Italian fencer
- Thomas Gulotta (1944–2019), American politician and lawyer
- Tony Gulotta (1903–1981), American racing driver
