= Trent Hayward =

American tennis player and coach

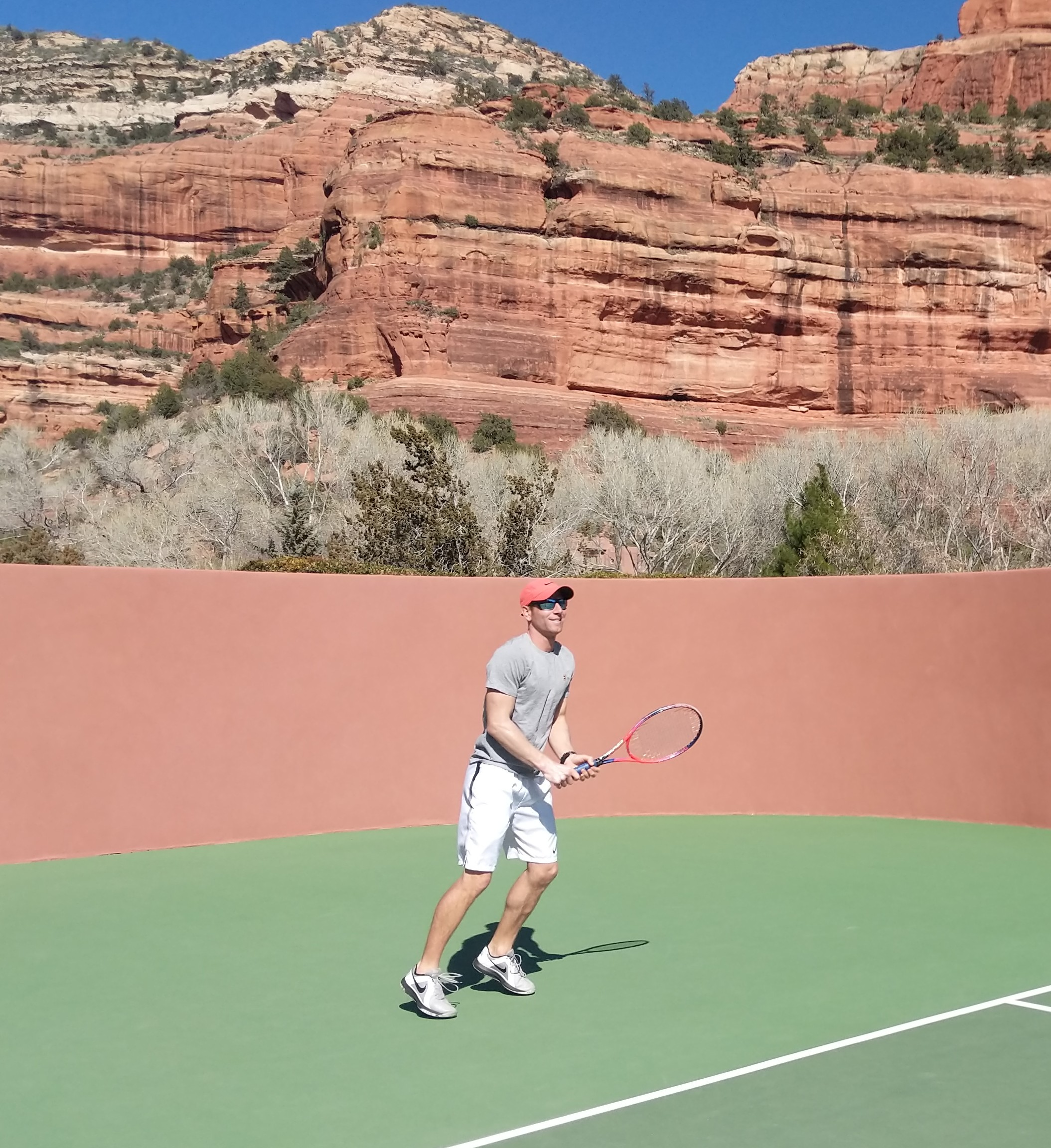

Personal information
- Born: May 5, 1987 (age 39)
- Home town: Columbus, OH
- Education: Northern Arizona University

Sport
- Country: United States
- Sport: Tennis

Trent Hayward is an American tennis player and performance coach. He is a former world-ranked competitor, NCAA D-1 Team MVP, and Guinness World Record Breaker & Holder.

== Achievements ==
Hayward began competing at age eight, and became a USTA player. In high school, Hayward moved to IMG Academy (of Bradenton, Florida) and became an International Tennis Federation (ITF) competitor. He played NCAA D-1 Tennis for the Northern Arizona University ‘Lumberjacks’ earning Team most valuable player M.V.P. and All-Conference honors. He last competed professionally in 2016, and went on to break - and currently holds - the Guinness World Record for ‘Most Successful Tennis Serves in an Hour’ at 1,658.

Hayward began coaching tennis at eight years old by volunteering with the Columbus (Ohio) Special Olympics Tennis Teams. He is listed as a contact for ‘Altitudes Tennis’, a tennis business located in Sedona, Arizona featured by National Geographic Tourism. He continues to direct tennis programs throughout Arizona as a performance coach.

== Family ==
Hayward is the son of Michael and Victoria Hayward of Columbus, Ohio.
