= Edward Hallowell =

Edward Hallowell may refer to:

- Edward Hallowell (herpetologist) (1808–1860), American herpetologist and physician
- Edward Hallowell (psychiatrist) (born 1949), American psychiatrist known for his work on Attention-deficit hyperactivity disorder
- Edward Needles Hallowell (1836–1871), officer in and later commander of the 54th Massachusetts Volunteer Infantry
