= Suzanne Doyle-Morris =

Australian writer and researcher

- Born: Alice Springs, Northern Territory, Australia

Suzanne Doyle-Morris is an author, speaker and leadership coach based in Pittenweem, Scotland.

== Early life ==
Suzanne Doyle-Morris was born in Australia in March 1975. She holds dual British and American citizenship.

== Career ==
Doyle-Morris earned a doctorate in 2003 from Cambridge University for her work on the experiences of women working in a male-dominated environment.

Doyle-Morris set up InclusIQ in 2013 as an inclusion consultancy. The consultancy focused on helping women in STEM and in male-dominated environments. In 2025, she closed InclusIQ to focus on her leadership coaching.

As of 2026, she has written three non-fiction books. The books focus on women working in male-dominated fields, female breadwinners, and confidence in the workplace.

== Awards and recognition ==
On 1 November 2017, Doyle-Morris was listed as one of BBC's 100 Women as part of the glass ceiling team.

In 2022, she received the Master Certified Coach credential from the International Coaching Federation (ICF), based on her 15 years of executive coaching. It is the highest-level coaching credential the ICF offers. She is also an Ambassador for Women's Enterprise Scotland and a Fellow of the Saltire Foundation.

== Written works ==
Title	Date	Ref.
Beyond the Boy's Club: Strategies for achieving career success as a woman working in a male dominated field	2009	
Female Breadwinners: How they make relationships work and why they are the future of the modern workplace	2011	
The Con Job: Getting Ahead for Competence in a World Obsessed with Confidence	2020	
