= Coaching =

Method of development

Coaching is a form of development in which an experienced person, called a coach, supports a learner or client in achieving a specific personal or professional goal by providing training and guidance. The learner is sometimes called a coachee. Occasionally, coaching may mean an informal relationship between two people, of whom one has more experience and expertise than the other and offers advice and guidance as the latter learns; but coaching differs from mentoring by focusing on specific tasks or objectives, as opposed to more general goals or overall development.

== Origins ==
The word "coaching" originated in the 16th century and initially referred to a method of transportation, specifically a horse-drawn carriage. It derived from the Hungarian word kocsi which meant a carriage from the village of Kocs, known for producing high-quality carriages. Over time, the term "coaching" transitioned from its literal transportation context to metaphorically represent the process of guiding and supporting individuals in their personal and professional development.

The first use of the term "coach" in connection with an instructor or trainer arose around 1830 in Oxford University slang for a tutor who "carried" a student through an exam. The word "coaching" thus identified a process used to transport people from where they are to where they want to be. The first use of the term in relation to sports came in 1861.

== History ==
Mathematical coaches at Cambridge University became famous for preparing wranglers competing in the Mathematical Tripos (1780 to 1909). This contest over several days tested for well-scripted solutions to mathematical problems.

The development of coaching has been influenced by many fields of activity, including adult education, the Human Potential Movement in the 1960s, large-group awareness training (LGAT) groups (such as Erhard Seminars Training, founded in 1971), leadership studies, personal development, and various subfields of psychology. The University of Sydney offered the world's first coaching psychology unit of study in January 2000, and various academic associations and academic journals for coaching psychology were established in subsequent years (see Coaching psychology § History).

== Applications ==
Coaching is applied in fields such as sports, performing arts (singers get vocal coaches), acting (drama coaches and dialect coaches), business, education, health care, relationships (for example, dating coaches), trauma healing (mind, body, soul coaches), and mindset (for example, positive thinking coaches).

Coaches use a range of communication skills (such as targeted restatements, listening, questioning, clarifying, etc.) to help clients shift their perspectives and thereby discover different approaches to achieve their goals. These skills can be used in almost all types of coaching. In this sense, coaching is a form of "meta-profession" that can apply to supporting clients in any human endeavor, ranging from their concerns in health, personal, professional, sport, social, family, political, spiritual dimensions, etc. There may be some overlap between certain types of coaching activities. Coaching approaches are also influenced by cultural differences.

=== Attention-deficit hyperactivity disorder (ADHD) ===
The concept of ADHD coaching was introduced in 1994 by psychiatrists Edward M. Hallowell and John J. Ratey in their book Driven to Distraction. ADHD coaching is a specialized type of life coaching that uses techniques designed to assist individuals with attention-deficit hyperactivity disorder by mitigating the effects of executive function deficit, which is a common impairment for people with ADHD. Coaches work with clients to help them better manage time, organize, set goals, and complete projects. In addition to assisting clients understand the impact of ADHD on their lives, coaches can help them develop "workaround" strategies to deal with specific challenges and determine and use individual strengths. Coaches also help clients get a better grasp of what reasonable expectations are for them as individuals since people with ADHD "brain wiring" often seem to need external "mirrors" for self-awareness about their potential despite their impairment.

=== Business and Executive ===
Business coaching is a type of human resource development for executives, members of management, teams, and leadership. It provides positive support, feedback, and advice on an individual or group basis to improve personal effectiveness in the business setting, many a time focusing on behavioral changes through psychometrics or 360-degree feedback for example. Business coaching is also called executive coaching, corporate coaching or leadership coaching. Coaches help their clients advance toward specific professional goals. These include career transition, interpersonal and professional communication, performance management, organizational effectiveness, managing career and personal changes, developing executive presence, building credibility, enhancing strategic thinking, dealing effectively with conflict, facing work challenges, and making swift and sound decisions, leading a change and building an effective team within an organization. An industrial-organizational psychologist may work as an executive coach.

Business coaching is not restricted to external experts or providers. Many organizations expect senior leaders and middle managers to coach their team members to reach higher performance levels, job satisfaction, personal growth, and career development. Research studies suggest that executive coaching has positive effects both within workplace performance and personal areas outside the workplace, with some differences in the impact of internal and external coaches.

In some countries, no licensing is required to be a business or executive coach, and membership in a coaching organization is optional. Further, standards and methods of training coaches can vary widely between coaching organizations. Many business coaches refer to themselves as consultants, a broader business relationship than one that exclusively involves coaching. Research findings from a systematic review indicate that effective coaches are known for having integrity, support for those they coach, communication skills, and credibility.

In the workplace, leadership coaching has been shown to be effective in increasing employee confidence in expressing their own ideas. A 2005 review suggested that coaching could help reduce stress in the workplace, but noted a lack of relevant published research.

=== Team coaching ===
Team coaching is a co-creative process where a professional coach will help a team collectively as one system, focusing on their shared purpose and team dynamics to help them reach shared goals. It surfaces how the whole team works together and how they related to their stakeholders. The International Coaching Federation (ICF) defines team coaching as the following: "Team coaching is an experience that allows a team to work towards sustainable results and ongoing development. It is becoming an increasingly important intervention in corporate environments as high team performance requires aligning toward goals, remaining innovative, and adapting quickly to internal and external changes."

Systemic team coaching is a framework developed by Professor Peter Hawkins. He details his approach in the book Leadership Team Coaching: Developing Collective Transformational Leadership, published by Kogan Page Limited in 2011.

=== Career ===
Career coaching focuses on work and career and is similar to career counseling. Career coaching is not to be confused with life coaching, which concentrates on personal development. Another common term for a career coach is "career guide".

=== Christian ===
A Christian coach is not a pastor or counselor (although the coach may also be qualified in those disciplines) but someone professionally trained to address specific coaching goals from a distinctively Christian or biblical perspective.

=== Co-coaching ===
Co-coaching is a structured practice of coaching between peers with the goal of learning improved coaching techniques.

=== Dating ===
Dating coaches offer coaching and related products and services to improve clients' success in dating and relationships.

=== Financial ===
Financial coaching is a relatively new form that focuses on helping clients overcome their struggle to attain specific financial goals and aspirations they have set for themselves. Financial coaching is a one-on-one relationship in which the coach provides encouragement and support to reach the client's economic plans. A financial coach, also called a money coach, typically focuses on helping clients to restructure and reduce debt, reduce spending, develop saving habits, and develop fiscal discipline. In contrast, the term financial adviser refers to a broader range of professionals who typically provide clients with financial products and services. Although early research links financial coaching to improvements in client outcomes, much more rigorous analysis is necessary before any causal linkages can be established.

=== Health and wellness ===
Health coaching is becoming recognized as a new way to help individuals manage illnesses and conditions, especially those of a chronic nature. The coach will use special techniques, personal experience, expertise, and encouragement to assist the coachee in bringing about behavioral change, while aiming for lower health risks and decreased healthcare costs. The National Society of Health Coaches (NSHC) has differentiated the term health coach from wellness coach. According to the NSHC, health coaches are qualified "to guide those with acute or chronic conditions and/or moderate to high health risk", and wellness coaches provide guidance and inspiration "to otherwise 'healthy' individuals who desire to maintain or improve their overall general health status".

=== Homework ===
Homework coaching focuses on equipping students with the study skills required to succeed academically. This approach differs from regular tutoring, which typically seeks to improve a student's performance in a specific subject.

=== In education ===
Coaching is applied to support students, faculty, and administrators in educational organizations. For students, opportunities for coaching include collaborating with fellow students to improve grades and skills, both academic and social; for teachers and administrators, coaching can help with transitions into new roles.

=== Life ===
Life coaching is the process of helping people identify and achieve personal goals through developing skills and attitudes that lead to self-empowerment. Life coaching generally deals with issues such as procrastination, fear of failure, relationships' issues, lack of confidence, work-life balance and career changes, and often occurs outside the workplace setting. Systematic academic psychological engagement with life coaching dates from the 1980s.

Skeptics have criticized life coaching's focus on self-improvement for its potential for commercializing friendships and other human relationships.

The business practices of the life coach industry have also stirred controversy. Unlike a psychotherapist, there is no required training, occupational licensing, or regulatory oversight for life coaching. Anyone can claim to be a life coach, and anyone can start a business selling "certificates" to would-be life coaches. Most life coaches in the US find that there is relatively low demand for the services they offer. Many pay for expensive classes in the hope that it will make them more marketable, leading critics to suggest that the most profitable area of the field is in training the would-be life coaches rather than being a life coach.

=== Relationship ===
Relationship coaching is the application of coaching to personal and business relationships.

=== Sports ===
In sports, a coach is an individual who provides supervision and training to the sports team or individual players. Sports coaches are involved in administration, athletic training, competition coaching, and team and player representation. A 2019 literature survey on sports coaching found an increase in publications, and most articles featured a quantitative research approach. Sports psychology emerged from the 1890s.

=== Esports ===
In esports, coaches are often responsible for planning game strategies and assisting in player development. For example, in the League of Legends World Championship, the head coach advises players via voice chat during the pick–and–ban phase of the game and during the intermission between matches.

=== Vocal ===
A vocal coach, also known as a voice coach (though this term often applies to those working with speech and communication rather than singing), is a music teacher, usually a piano accompanist, who helps singers prepare for a performance, often also helping them to improve their singing technique and take care of and develop their voice, but is not the same as a singing teacher (also called a "voice teacher"). Vocal coaches may give singers private music lessons, group workshops, or masterclasses. They may also coach singers who are rehearsing on stage or who are singing during a recording session.

=== Writing ===
A writing coach helps writers—such as students, journalists, and other professionals—improve their writing and productivity.

== Ethics and standards ==
Since the mid-1990s, coaching professional associations have worked towards developing training standards. Psychologist Jonathan Passmore noted in 2016:

While coaching has become a recognized intervention, sadly there are still no standards or licensing arrangements which are widely recognized. Professional bodies have continued to develop their own standards, but the lack of regulation means anyone can call themselves a coach. ... Whether coaching is a profession which requires regulation, or is professional and requires standards, remains a matter of debate.

One of the challenges in the field of coaching is upholding levels of professionalism, standards, and ethics. To this end, coaching bodies and organizations have codes of ethics and member standards. However, because these bodies are not regulated, and because coaches do not need to belong to such a body, ethics and standards are variable in the field. In February 2016, the Association for Coaching (AC) and the European Mentoring and Coaching Council (EMCC) launched a "Global Code of Ethics" for the entire industry; the International Coaching Federation (ICF) also provides voluntary coach credentialing, training accreditation, and ethical standards.

Many coaches have little training in comparison to the training requirements of some other helping professions. For example, licensure as a counseling psychologist in the State of California requires 3,000 hours of supervised professional experience. Some coaches are both certified coaches and licensed counseling psychologists, integrating coaching and counseling.

Critics see life coaching as akin to psychotherapy but without the legal restrictions and state regulation of psychologists. There are no state regulations/licensing requirements for coaches. Due to a lack of regulation, people without formal training or certification can legally call themselves life or wellness coaches.

== See also ==
- List of counseling topics
- List of psychotherapies
- Personal development – Activities that develop a person's capabilities and potential
- Self-actualization – Human emotional need
- Self-discovery – Person attempts to determine how they feel about spiritual issues or priorities
- Self-help – Self-guided improvement
- Training and development – Improving the effectiveness of organizations and the individuals and teams within them
