= Emotion-in-relationships model =

The Emotion-in-Relationships model (ERM) describes a theory designed to predict individual's experiences towards emotions. First introduced by Ellen Berscheid in 1983, it was further developed in cooperation with Hilary Amazzalorso in 2001. ERM proposes that intense emotions (i.e. joy, love, surprise, humor, anger, fear) in a close reciprocal relationship occur when the relationship partner violates our expectancies and thereby interrupts a behavior sequence. The situation is unconsciously evaluated, leading to a positive or negative feeling, which depends on whether the violation of the expectancies is a facilitation or a threat.

A relationship is not easily defined: either characterized by an especially strong bond and the positive feelings towards the relationship partner or the reciprocal dependency. This model draws attention to another important definition: once two people are in a close relationship with each other, the change in the state of one person is able to cause a change in the state of the other person; they are highly interdependent on each other. After having the ‘infrastructure’ of a relationship - with all the causal interconnections between the partner's activities - the emotional experience within the relationship can flourish.

== Influence ==
ERM is based on George Mandler’s interruption theory, which states that emotion is experienced when there is a change in relating patterns, meaning that a partner (not necessarily romantic) behaves in unexpected or unusual ways. This can have either positive or negative impacts, depending on the way it affects the individual's goals. The theory can be used to explain the roots of emotions within close relationships (because emotions are less likely to occur in superficial relationships) and people’s conversation behavior in courtship and marriage. Moreover, it can be used in therapeutic treatments to reduce the number of negative emotions in a relationship by persuading the violating partner to bring his or her behaviour in line with the individual’s expectations (“change the partner” approach) or change one's own expectations to bring them in line with the partner's actual behaviour (“change myself and accept the partner” approach).

== Theory ==
ERM defines a close relationship and describes how expectancies and disruption of behavioral activities could lead to emotional arousal. ERM predicts that emotions in relationships occur because partners are usually highly interdependent on each other. As a result, they develop rather consciously or unconsciously expectations towards the behavior and attitudes of their partners, who if not performing like expected, are violating the expectancies, which in turn leads to the experience of emotions, positive as well as negative ones.

=== Infrastructure of a close relationship ===
According to most emotion theories, emotions, both positive and negative ones, occur most frequently and intensely among people in close interpersonal relationship. A close relationship is defined as a state of the relationship in which partners are highly interdependent, although the degrees of dependence are not necessarily equal.

Characteristics

Four characteristics of interaction pattern that determine the closeness of a relationship:

- the partners frequently influence each other's behaviors
- the influence occurs in a diversity of behaviors
- the influence is strong in magnitude
- the interaction pattern with three above characteristics has lasted for a relatively long duration of time.

In other words, a relationship is established based on the causal linkages between the activities of two partners. Each partner also has their own activity chain in which organized action sequences are formed as parts of higher-order plans. These intrachain sequences are connected or "meshed" with each other. The closer the relationship is, the more frequent, diverse and stronger the interconnections between activities of two persons are over a long time duration.

Therefore, in a close relationship, a partner's behavior can be reliably and accurately predicted from the other partner's behavior. The influence can be either intentional or unintentional. The types of behaviors that the partners influence may consist of cognitive behaviors, physiological behaviors, motor and verbal behaviors.

=== Relationship expectancies ===
The relationship expectancies result out of the gradually increasing knowledge of partners in a relationship. With increasing knowledge also the dependency in the relationship increases and results at the same time in expectancies of the two partners towards each other and the possibilities of potential expectancy violations. These, in turn, are the basic conditions for the experience of emotions in relationships. This web of expectancies includes characteristics, personality, but also behavioral dispositions, attitudes and habits that a partner forms towards their mate. This allows the reciprocal coordination of actions and plans to maximize one's own and the partner's well-being. Expectancies can be seen as the emotional investment of the individual that is given to the relationship and also carries the potential for violation of expectations. Both partners are often unaware of their own expectancies, because also cultural norms, customs and understandings, as well as how other relationships have been observed, result into the expectations in one's own relationship. But over time both partners violate and eventually confirm each other's expectancies so that the longer and closer a relationship is, the more often the relationship expectancies were repeatedly acknowledged and confirmed.

=== Disruption of behavioral activities ===
If a partner fails to perform as expected in a relationship that can result through disruption of behavioral activities in violation of the individual's expectancies. Since over time the development of interaction routines – so-called highly ‘meshed interaction sequences’ – are crucial to the relationship and build on the relationship expectancies, they are also highly sensitive to violation thereof. The aim of these routines is to reconcile the individual's plans and goals to enhance each other's welfare through coordination of daily activities. If this routine of activities is disrupted, negative emotions can appear because of the violation of expectancies in the relationship. In a long-term relationship an unexpected loss of a partner, through rejection or death, can even result in enormous grief or anger. In contrast, if the relationship is rather superficial and the partners are living independently, there are fewer opportunities for expectancy violation and, if so, the consequences are less severe to the individual's well-being.

== Application ==
Close relationships consist of a set of interconnected expectancies. These expectancies refer especially to the behavior of the partner and can be constructed consciously or unconsciously. Spending time together leads to satisfaction and well-being within a relationship. Furthermore, shared activities also propose opportunities in which the partner can facilitate one's welfare or opportunities to interfere with it.

The number and strength of expectancies increases as the relationship grows closer. According to ERM, partners try to achieve their own welfare. By predicting the others behavior, one can direct and plan own actions to achieve it. If a violation of the predicted behavior takes place, extreme negative or intense positive emotions are likely to occur, whereas the accomplishment of expectancies results in mild emotions.

ERM has also been applied to predict the development of a close relationship on the basis of communication. Due to the perceived difference between hindrance and facilitation the focus of application is on the consequences of interference.

By analyzing the conversation between partners, it becomes clear that interference hinders the fluency of conversation and brings along unfavorable judgments and negative emotional reactions. Problems with articulating messages can be caused by one partner perceiving interruption by the other. The favorable or unfavorable judgment of the conversation can be provoked by the individual experiencing the current interaction as either unpleasant or effective.

A future application of the model is to anticipate the interpersonal influence of persuasion between partners. Suggesting that the interpretation of a message is based on ERM, the time partners invest in shared activity is modulated.

Combining the communication factors and prediction of the development of the future relationship, application of ERM can be used for psychotherapy in relationships. The communication between partners can be reflected and modulated. Awareness of the proposed expectancies may result in the avoidance or resolution of conflicts based on emotional bursts. Therapists use several strategies for distressed relationships. Either it is possible to bring the expectancies in line with the violated behavior of the partner, or one can adjust the expectancies to the actual behavior of the partner. Thus, ERM can be used to apply compromise and accommodation strategies.

== Validity & Alternative model ==
ERM is based on individual organised sequences of behavior, like hopes and dreams, and is therefore not easy to test in an experimental way. This model can only be tested in the real world, where the emotion action takes place. Because the ERM can not be easily tested, a new model is introduced which can be tested in an experimental way.

To measure the relationships, the Relationship Closeness Inventory (RCI) was invented. This model is based on three measurements to specify the degree of closeness in relationships, which are frequency, diversity and strength. These three measurements, get combined into a score that can be studied from a quantitative point of view. Result concluded that emotions are experienced most excessive in closest relationships.
