= Ellen S. Berscheid =

American psychologist (1936–2025)

Ellen Patricia Saumer Berscheid (October 11, 1936 – May 22, 2025) was an American social psychologist who was a Regents professor at the University of Minnesota, where she earlier had earned her PhD in 1965. Berscheid conducted research on interpersonal relationships, emotions and moods, and social cognition. Berscheid wrote books, articles and other publications to contribute to the field of Social Psychology. She was involved in controversy surrounding the funding for her research on why people fall in love. In addition to her position at the University of Minnesota as a Psychology and Business professor, she also held a position at Pillsbury. She received awards for her contributions to social psychology, including The Presidential Citation and the Distinguished Scientific Contribution Award from the American Psychological Association.

Berscheid died on May 22, 2025, at the age of 88.

== Early life and career ==
Berscheid was born on October 11, 1936. She started her academic career as an Education major at Beloit College in Wisconsin, before transferring to University of Nevada, Reno. There she was given a research assistant grant by her professor, Paul Secord. Berscheid picked up psychology as her second major and graduated with honors. After graduation Berscheid applied for and received PHS Predoctoral Research Fellowship, at the University of Minnesota to work with Harold Kelley. However, Berscheid decided to decline the offer and became a research administrator for Pillsbury. Berscheid later applied for a research assistantship at the University of Minnesota, working with Elliot Aronson. Under the direction of Elliot Aronson she obtained her PhD in social psychology.

Berscheid accepted a job teaching research methods in the business department at the University of Minnesota. Through the business department, Berscheid met Elaine (Walster) Hatfield. Hatfield convinced Berscheid to join her in researching equity and attraction. At the time, women conducting research was rare and may have been stopped if too many people had taken notice, therefore Hatfield and Berscheid conducted their research quietly through a federal grant. Berscheid's main research interest was interpersonal relationships. Ellen Berscheid looked at why people fall in love, the meaning of love, and attraction in close relationships.

In 1983 Berscheid introduced the Emotion-in-Relationships Model (ERM), a theory designed to predict individual's experiences towards emotions.

== Controversy ==
In 1974, Berscheid was the center of a controversy regarding federal funding of research. Senator William Proxmire of Wisconsin used her as an example when he awarded the National Science Foundation his first Golden Fleece award, which was presented monthly between 1975 and 1988, in order to focus media attention on projects Proxmire viewed as self-serving and wasteful of taxpayer dollar. Berscheid had been granted $84,000 by the foundation to research why people fall in love. The scandal "called into question use of public funds in scientific research."

A few years later, Hatfield left the business department and Berscheid took over Hatfield's job as Student Activities Bureau. Due to an all-male faculty, Berscheid expected an early retirement but then was offered a professorship in the psychology department. Berscheid remained on the Psychology Faculty at the University of Minnesota.

== Significant publications ==
Books

- Berscheid, E., & Regan, P. (2005). The psychology of interpersonal relationships. New York: Prentice-Hall.

Journal articles

- Berscheid, E. (2006). Notes on the social psychological study of love. Impulse, 60, 5–13.
- Berscheid, E (1999). "The greening of relationship science". American Psychologist. 54 (4): 260–266. doi:10.1037/0003-066x.54.4.260. PMID 10217995.
- Reis, H. T.; Collins, W. A.; Berscheid, E. (2000). "The relationship context of human behavior and development". Psychological Bulletin. 126 (6): 844–872. doi:10.1037/0033-2909.126.6.844. PMID 11107879.

Other publications

- Berscheid, E. (2006). Searching for the meaning of "love." In R. J. Sternberg & K. Weis (Eds.), The psychology of love (2nd ed., pp. 171–183). New Haven, CT: Yale University Press.
- Berscheid, E. (1994). Interpersonal relationships. In L. W. Porter & M. R. Rosenzweig (Eds.), Annual Review of Psychology (pp. 79–129). Palo Alto, CA: Annual Reviews.
- Berscheid, E., & Reis, H. T. (1998). Attraction and close relationships. In D. T. Gilbert, S. T. Fiske, & G. Lindzey (Eds.), The handbook of social psychology (4th ed., pp. 193–281). New York: McGraw-Hill.

== Legacy ==
Ellen Berscheid received awards for her contributions to social psychology, including the Presidential Citation and Distinguished Scientific Contribution Award presented by the American Psychological Association, Distinguished Scientist Award from the Society of Experimental Social Psychology, and the Distinguished Career Award by International Society for the Study of Personal Relationships. Berscheid also held presidency of the International Society for the Study of Interpersonal Relationships (1991–1992) and the Society of Personality and Social Psychology (1983–1985).

== See also ==
- Interpersonal attraction

== Sources ==
- Berscheid, E., & Regan, P. C. (2005). The psychology of interpersonal relationships. New York: Prentice-Hall.
- Berscheid & Walster: Interpersonal Attraction
