= Achterste Erm =

- Hamlet
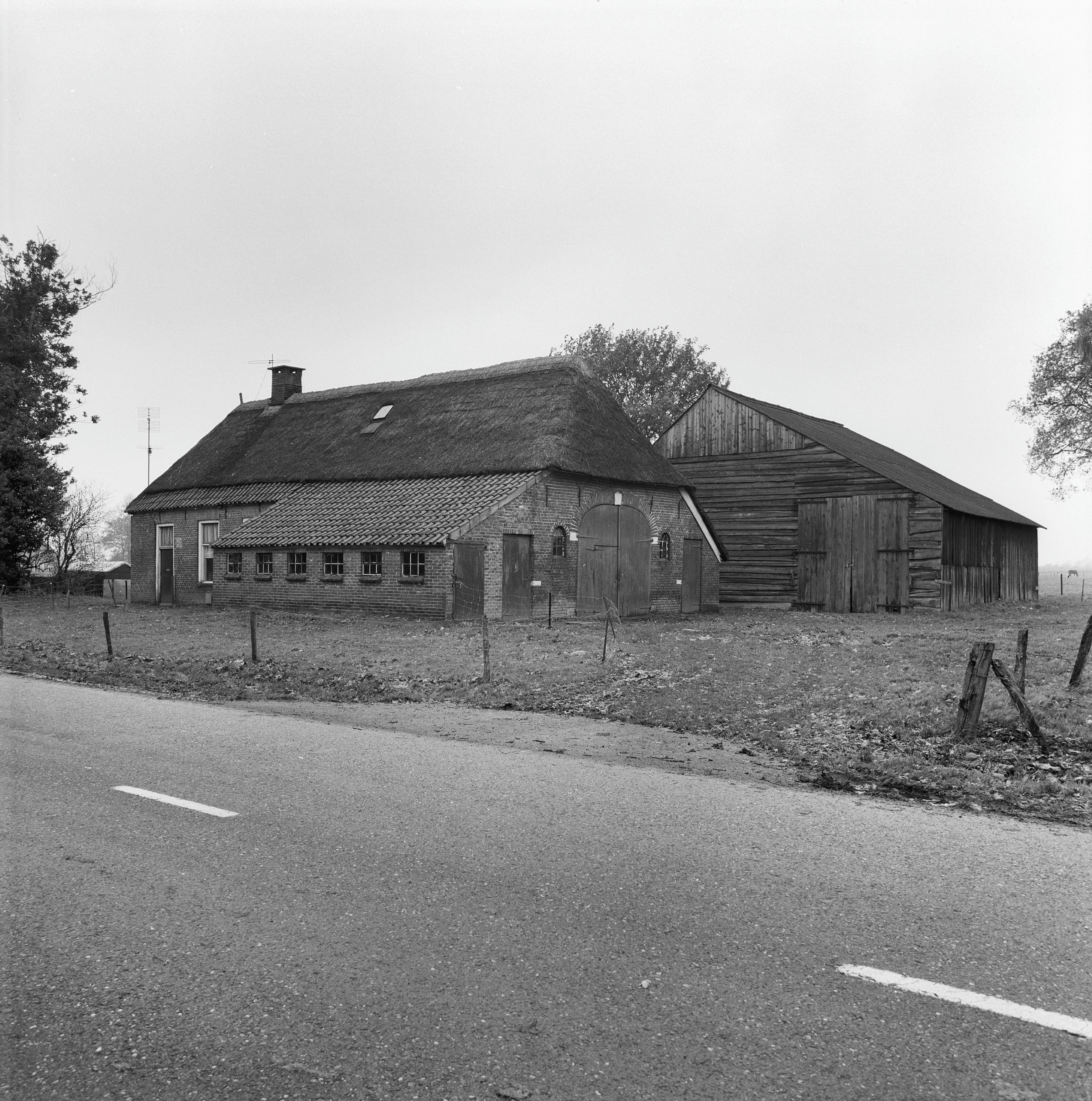
- Farm in Achterste Erm

- Location in the province of Drenthe in the Netherlands Achterste Erm (Netherlands)
- Coordinates: 52.7425°N 6.8243°E
- Country: Netherlands
- Province: Drenthe
- Municipality: Coevorden

Area
  - Total: 0.47 km^{2} (0.18 sq mi)
- Elevation: 17 m (56 ft)

Population (2021)
  - Total: 80
  - Density: 170/km^{2} (440/sq mi)
- Time zone: UTC+1 (CET)
  - Summer (DST): UTC+2 (CEST)
- Postal code: 7843
- Dialing code: 0591

Achterste Erm is a hamlet in the Netherlands, it is part of the Coevorden municipality in Drenthe.

Achterste Erm is a statistical entity, but the postal authorities have placed it under Erm. It was first mentioned in 1936 as Achterste-Erm, and means "the furthers part of Erm".

== See also ==
- Erm, Netherlands
