= ADHD 2.0 =

2021 non-fiction book

- Author: Edward M. Hallowell; John J. Ratey
- Language: English
- Genre: Nonfiction
- Publisher: Ballantine Books
- Publication date: January 12, 2021
- Publication place: United States
- Media type: Print (hardback)
- Pages: 208
- ISBN: 978-0399178733

ADHD 2.0: New Science and Essential Strategies for Thriving with Distraction—from Childhood through Adulthood is a 2021 non-fiction book by psychiatrists Edward M. Hallowell and John J. Ratey.

== Synopsis ==
Hallowell and Ratey, rather than framing Attention Deficit Hyperactivity Disorder (ADHD) as only a disorder, describe it as a condition with advantages and disadvantages, if properly managed. Chapters focus on creating the right supports and the right environment to enable children and adults with ADHD to succeed. The first chapter emphasizes that ADHD is not a single trait, but a "spectrum of traits," including an "itch" to create, strive, and act; as well as the better-known aspects such as inattention and hyperactivity. The second chapter describes two functions of the brain known as the default mode network (DMN) and the task-positive network (TPN) and how these regions work in people with ADHD. The third chapter explains ADHD's potential connection with the cerebellum, leading to new but promising ADHD treatments that involve touch and balance exercises. The fourth chapter stresses the importance of love and connection in managing ADHD. The fifth chapter includes stories that illustrate the perseverance and creativity of people with ADHD, provided they find tasks and goals that are "the right kind of difficult." The sixth chapter describes the creation of the right home, work, and school environments to facilitate success for people with ADHD. Chapters 7 and 8 include the benefits of exercise and medication, respectively.

== Reception ==
Nancy Hernandez and John Carlson praised the book for emphasizing ADHD as a potential asset rather than a deficit, thus bringing a "unique lens to ADHD, to which all school psychologists (SPs) should be exposed." Publishers Weekly reviewed the book positively, stating, "This information-packed guide is a must-have for anyone dealing with ADHD." In Psychology Today, Lloyd Sederer called the book "clear, personable, digestible, and useful." Sederer also notes that Hallowell and Ratey summarize key points from their previous research in the book so that people unfamiliar with their 1994 book Driven to Distraction can consult this one without missing important information.
