= Guglielmo Gulotta =

Italian barrister and psychologist

Guglielmo Gulotta has been a full professor (retired since 2009) at the University of Turin, Department of Psychology. He continues his career in law as a criminal barrister of the Milan Court, and his law activity takes him all around Italy. He is a psychologist and a psychotherapist.

Despite his retirement as an academic, Guglielmo Gulotta continues to give lectures and participate in important national debates regarding psychology as a science of human facts. His major expertise concerns the forensic setting, having been one of the first Italian criminal barristers to have a psychology specialisation. This dual competence (law and psychology) has promoted a novel and enriched approach to studying criminal law and to go beyond the mechanical application of the legal norms to the forensic case.

His scientific career has been witnessed by his work done in various areas of psychology and the law.

Gulotta is the Editor of two scientific series with the Milan Publisher – [Giuffrè]: Juridical and Criminal Psychology Series and Notebooks on Psychology Series. He has published up to now, as an author and a co-author, 50 books, and more than 300 scientific papers, some of them in different languages.

Gulotta is considered one of the most prominent contemporary authorities in Juridical and Forensic Psychology in Italy.

His fundamental scientific work lies in the complex and controversial task of reducing the gap between the law and psychology, and in creating a bridge between these two areas of human investigation and behaviour.

The scientific influence of Guglielmo Gulotta has spread widely from criminal law through: attribution theory; child abuse allegations; ethics in psychology and in professional practice; forensic neuroscience; forensic psychology; humour in life and in psychotherapy; interpersonal influence studies; mobbing; psychoanalysis and individual responsibility; psychology of last will and testament; social psychology as a science of everyday life; systemic theory and family conflicts; touristic psychology; victimology.

== Personal life ==
Guglielmo Gulotta was born in Milan on 11 July 1939. His family can be traced back to Sicily and Naples, and his pride in his roots is warmly expressed by his high spirit and vibrant character, which broadens his personality.
Gulotta lives between Milan and Turin, and travels around all Italy.

== Academic life ==
After his Upper Honour Degree in Law cum laude at the University of Milan in 1964, Gulotta continued his practice in law, and in 1966 he passed the exam to be on the Board of Lawyers of the Milan Tribunal.

His curiosity for human behaviour and interpersonal relationships continued to grow and in 1968 he was awarded a scholarship, which lasted until 1970, to follow a research programme at the Institute of Criminal Law in the University of Milan. Since the beginning of his life as a researcher he has believed that the science of psychology could shed some light on the complexity of mental dimensions and human relationships of the different actors in the court.

He started to study psychology avidly and in 1969 obtained his specialisation in Psychology at the University of Turin, where he subsequently returned as a Full Professor in 1995. He always remembers a film that he went to watch at the cinema, when it was first released in 1962, which apparently changed his life and his way of thinking for ever: Freud: The Secret Passion, also known as Freud. The film was a drama based on the life of the Austrian psychoanalyst Sigmund Freud.

Gulotta started then to see the possible and amazing use of psychology within the legal and criminal law scenarios. His career as a criminal barrister and as an academic started to take off. He believes that the law and psychology are two overlapping disciplines; they both study human behaviour. The first to control it; the second to explain it. In 1974 he became a collaborator, in a four-year research contract, with Prof. Pietro Nuvolone at the Institute of Criminal Law, University of Milan. In 1978 he worked at the Institute of Psychology alongside professor Marcello Cesa-Bianchi, director of the Juridical Psychology Section at the Department of Medicine (University of Milan). From 1982 to 1984 he was the President of AGAM (Association of Young Lawyers in Milan). In 1982 he obtained a researcher post at the Institute of Criminal Law, University of Milan, where is stayed until 1986, the year in which his interest and specialisation in psychology took him to Sardinia. At the University of Cagliari he was appointed as a full Professor in Social Psychology.

He enjoyed his academic life in Cagliari and his interest in joining law and psychology even closer developed greatly. In 1995 he was granted a post as a Full Professor in Juridical Psychology, at the University of Turin. The cathedra of Juridical Psychology granted to him was the first in Italy. His high commitment and work in the field was starting to pay off, not only within his practice as a barrister, but also as an academic.
In 2000 he directed a group of research about serial homicides and murder without a probable cause. He retired as university professor in 2009. Among his many students should be mentioned professor Cristina Cabras, doctor Roberta Bruzzone, doctor Alessandra Bramante, doctor Angelo Zappalà and doctor Fabrizio Russo.

== Scientific and professional life ==
The most crucial insight within his scientific legacy is that human behaviour can be assessed and judged, as it happens every day in the Court, only by contextualising human actions and choices within the psychosocial reality of the defendant, the witnesses, the public prosecutor, the jury, and the Judge, and by recognising the psychological influences upon them. This was a remarkable insight by a person who was first trained in law and who first practiced in a field in which psychology was seen as something akin to astrology, and remote from the certainty and clear cut attitude required in Court.

In one of his edited books Treatise of Juridical Psychology [Trattato di Psicologia giudiziaria], 1987, inspired by the novels and plays of Luigi Pirandello and in line with the work of Erving Goffman, he described the Court as a theatre. He identified the different figures operating there, both on the stage and in the backstage, with actors reciting their own roles within their specific status.

In this forensic theatre, the drama of life is unfolded daily, and every day the case presented to the Judge exists only by virtue of how the evidence was gathered and collated; how the public accuser perceives and understands the dynamics of personal and social responsibilities involved; how the lawyer or the barrister introduces and argues the defense; how the defendant furnishes information about their behaviour and their possible involvement, or not, in the case; how the alleged victim reports the experience; how the witnesses contribute to the understanding of the case; how the experts provide clarity.

Many of these dimensions imply that what we deal with in the Court is not actually anymore the factual historical reality of events, but has something to do with the [procedural reality], which is how events are reconstructed via a process affected by personal memory, perception, and understanding of what was and is going on.

Inspired by the work of scientists such as Peter L. Berger and Thomas Luckmann, and of the Scottish psychiatrist R. D. Laing, Gulotta believes that reality is a social construction, and that human beings are directly responsible for this natural fabrication of life and interpersonal relationships. Gulotta has also devoted some attention to victimology, paying a specific tribute to family violence.

Guglielmo Gulotta calls his interdisciplinary approach the psychology of everyday life in which he thinks it is essential to include forensic psychology as well. 'How' and 'why' people respect the law, as well as 'how' and 'why' people break the law, can depend on the extent to which individuals are supported by or alienated from their own individual and social conditions, and also on the opportunities that society gives them to develop (or not) who they are and can be. His prolific publication track record is an example of how he can move easily from one subject to another. For those interested in the list of his publications, the website of the Guglielmo Gulotta Foundation lists them in detail: see link publications

== Protocols and guidelines ==
Guglielmo Gulotta is actively involved in applying theory to practice and in the course of his long professional career he has been the creator and the promoter of many published protocols and documents. The Noto Charter [Carta di Noto], created and developed with Luisella DeCataldo and other professionals in 1996, was then revised on July 7 2002, on June 12 2011 and again on October 14 2017, in its fourth edition. It is a document which contains guidelines for the examination of a minor in cases of sexual abuse.

The Venice Protocol [Protocollo di Venezia] was crafted and produced on September 21–23 2007, with a group of professionals from different scientific disciplines such as law, psychology, criminology, child neuropsychology, and psychiatry. The document intends to be a guideline and a methodological tool to assist professionals in those cases in which a forensic diagnosis of an alleged sexual collective abuse of a minor is required.

Both documents have been shaped: with faithful reference to the jurisprudence and legislative developments in law; with wide recognition of the specialised international literature; with humble respect of the evidence-based findings offered by the progress of scientific research in this area. The Forensic Psychology Guidelines have been published as a book entitled Innocenza e colpevolezza sul banco degli imputati (Innocence and guilt in the dock) in 2018, with the famous Italian Publisher Giuffrè. This work is the highest expression of the combination of forensic activity and psychology in its various expressions, such as cognitive, social, neuroscience, communication and interpersonal relationships. It is a commentary on the Guidelines drawn up by a group of scholars, academics and professionals in the legal and psychosocial sciences who have drafted them with the intention of limiting the numerous judicial errors - both in the sense of the acquittal of a guilty person and the conviction of an innocent person - that afflict the criminal justice system and, as a consequence, our society. The book provides a description of the entire criminal process, from the investigation to the trial, and all criminal matters are examined to counter the errors, to reduce preconceptions and biases that can pollute the forensic action, with the aim of achieving an informed and critical cognitive vigilance.

Guglielmo Gulotta is, along other colleagues, the developer of the Patavino Memorandum, which is concerned with the application of neuroscience to legal capacities. This memorandum is a compendium about the most recent neuroscientific techniques used in the forensic field in Italy; it is, therefore an indispensable tool for professionals: forensic experts, technical consultants, magistrates, judges, and lawyers.

The commission of a crime is a human phenomenon which is profoundly complex and affected by many factors and variables, not always controllable. It must be understood and defined according to the interactionist language. The concepts of "mind", "consciousness" and "awareness" are parts of a much larger context of the interaction between cognitive functioning, individual psychological and psychophysiological responses, social, environmental and cultural influences. It is in the light of this perspective that the Memorandum speaks of individual responsibility as a derivative of the so-called "social brain", whose structure and function are represented by human interaction. The Patavino Memorandum was inspired by the Brain Waves Module 4: Neuroscience and the law (2011), and suggests that, in the current state of the art, neuroscience is not able to be the keystone of judicial diagnoses on its own. Neuroscience constitutes rather a contribution which, however authoritative and fascinating, is likely to continuously require interaction with and contribution from other sciences, in particular, empirical-social sciences.

== Family violence ==
International studies have underlined a preoccupying rise in family dysfunction, abuse and violence, and yet these domestic troubles remain, in most cases, secrets or, at best, unknown to the extent that the shifting manifestation of deviance stays underestimated. At the Septieme Congress Des nations Unies Pour la Prevention du Crime et le Traitment des Delinquants, in 1985, Gulotta, in his personal communication entitled "Victims within the family" offered the following discerning words on family victimology:

"The fact that the family has the delicate function of first adapting the individual to society and also serv[ing] as a refuge from the stresses of social life outside its confines, means that victimization within the family represents a phenomenon of special gravity, calling for particular intervention […] (Gulotta, 1985, p. 13)”.

Family victimology has been the stepping stone for his work on child abuse.

No doubt children have been often and for lengthy periods, silent victims of maltreatment, neglect, physical, psychological and sexual violence. The family setting is at times the most privileged environment for this type of crime to take place. It makes it easier to get access to children, to groom them and viciously entangle him/her in a promiscuous relationship. Family settings, once they permit the abuse dynamic to take place, can easily sustain it because of the claim to family privacy that allows the clearance of all external interferences.

Family is supposed to provide a child with a climate of protection, love and care.

Who can then be allowed to unveil the truth behind this paradisiacal scenario?

Real experiences and scientific evidence are extensively gathering data to reveal, unfortunately, that family members, and not least parents, can, at times, be responsible for such heinous acts. In all this drama, which clusters together political, scientific, and professional forces, there exists another form of silent victimology, the one that focuses on false positives, that is the cases in which children of any age, and even adults, become convinced or are made to believe that they have experienced some form of sexual abuse either at present or in their past. The reality of false positives was born within the realm of public hysteria in which the urgency to protect children has been made so extreme that everything, every gesture or word that an adult performs, is considered abuse unless otherwise proved. In all this paraphernalia, Gulotta is convinced that the result of all this is that more victims are made and more suffering emerges. Gulotta considers that for a child to believe and to grow up with the credence that he/she has been abused by either their mother or father, or by one of their relatives, or by their school teacher or neighbour, when in fact it has not actually occurred, can perhaps be as emotionally damaging and traumatic as a real endured abuse.

== Cross examinations studies ==
In 2018 Guglielmo Gulotta published the new edition of his book (edited in 2012) on the cross-examination, what he calls a "scientific art". This volume identifies two hundred rules for cross-examination. The origin of these rules derives from the Code of Criminal Procedure, from the professional experience of Guglielmo Gulotta and other professionals in court, from an extensive Italian and Anglo-American literature on the subject of cross-examination, and from practices and customs that make up what could be defined as "procedural etiquette". On the one hand, Guglielmo Gulotta defines this activity as a scientific art because it involves a certain talent composed of critical sense, flexibility, and creativity. On the other hand, this definition suggests that the compass of implied behaviours is of a scientific nature. There is a dual reference to the science of law and to psycho-social sciences that study human conduct, and in particular psychology and psycho-socio-linguistics. The volume is organized by charts associated with the 200 rules, and that helps to explain, justify, encourage and criticize behaviours that are suggested or discouraged within the forensic setting and in the court.

== Other areas of scientific interest ==
Guglielmo Gulotta has been using "everyday life" as a laboratory to explore empirically many of the concepts of social psychology and of the psychology of communication. His versatile mind has allowed Guglielmo Gulotta to develop in Italy the psychology of tourism. Because of his achievement he is now the President of ARIPT - Associazione Ricerche Interdisciplinari Psicologia del Turismo – (The Association of the Interdisciplinary Research of the Psychology of Tourism). How to communicate is particularly important in the academic and legal career of any professional. Gugliemo Gulotta has made his interest for communication a topic of his research attention. This scientific interest has led to different scientific publications. One of the most important ones is Sapersi esprimere, published with another colleague, and by the publisher Giuffrè in 2009. This works is related to the know-how of how to express oneself, combined with the analysis of two dimensions of communication and human behaviour: lying and falsehood, and sincerity and honesty. An assumption addressed in the book is that if communication between humans could be carried out telepathically, there might be less interference, than what happens with expressing ourselves in words and gestures, and with all our behaviour. Guglielmo Gulotta and Luisella De Cataldo (the co-author) have taken on the task of addressing the complex topic of communication using the results of the most up-to-date psychological research available. The conclusions are encouraging: communication competence, both in the private and professional context, can be learned and improved.

Psychotherapy and hypnosis are two other areas of interests for Guglielmo Gulotta, which highlights his versatile professional and vibrant personality, which conveys curiosity, creativity and an interest to integrate ideas and areas of knowledge.

== Recent achievements ==
Justice, and this is the great value, which has inspired the professional and scientific work of Gulotta, can be achieved only when a scientific-evidence methodology is appropriately used to explore, address and resolve the complexity of sex abuse allegations. Within his long track record of studies done in forensic psychology, with the aim of addressing the matter of false negative allegations of child abuse, two important documents should be remembered and be associated with his name: the above mentioned Noto Charter and Venice Protocol.

One of Gulotta's books, Juridical psychology and psychological law is a comprehensive theoretical and empirical analysis of how these two main domains (law and psychology) are intertwined in the real world. The book collects some of the work Gulotta has shared with his collaborators. It moves from a similar point of view Gulotta's Compendium of legal-forensic, criminal and investigative psychology, recently published in a new edition with multimedia content.

He has been involved in hundreds of conferences and symposiums, in numerous radio and TV programmes and his competence has been widely appreciated.

A recent achievement of Gulotta is the creation of a Foundation under his name, Guglielmo Gulotta Foundation (see link). The aims are the promotion, realisation, and dissemination of studies, scientific research, and professional training in forensic and social psychology, and strategic communication. The scope is to help experienced professionals to update and enrich their competence, or to develop in new generation of professionals, those skills – the social and forensic psychology know how – which have become so indispensable and fundamental within the social and forensic fields where they are called upon to perform. The rationale of the Guglielmo Gulotta Foundation is to make a contribution to the development of professionals who show fairness in the words they proffer, justice in their decisions, honesty in their actions, and sensitivity in their handling of cases. The gratitude of all his students and colleagues goes out to him not just for what he has been able to teach, but for making them appreciate that what is also important in science is to have the courage to make one's own choice, and to address it with a sense of personal and professional responsibility.

A recent book (Il nuovo codice deontologico degli psicologi. Commentato articolo per articolo con decisioni ordinistiche e giurisprudenza ordinaria) which was published in 2018 with two other colleagues (Eugenio Calvi and Elena Leardini) is a new edition of the commentary on the Code of Ethics for Psychologists, in which each article of the Code of Ethics is analysed with ordinary decisions and case law, and contextualised with how they are applied to the professional practice of psychologists.

== Major works ==
- Gulotta G. (1976). Commedie e drammi nel matrimonio [Comedy and drama in marriage]. Milan: Giuffrè.
- Gulotta G. (1984). Famiglia e violenza [Family and violence]. Milan: Giuffrè.
- Gulotta G. (1985). Victims within the family. Septieme Congress Des nations Unies Pour la Prevention du Crime et le Traitment des Delinquants.
- Gulotta G. (1987). Trattato di Psicologia giudiziaria [Treatise of Juridical Psychology]. Milan: Giuffrè.
- Gulotta G. (1995). La psicologia della vita quotidiana [The psychology of everyday life]. Milan: Giuffrè.
- Gulotta G. (1997). L'intelligenza sociale [Social Intelligence]. Milan: Giuffrè.
- Gulotta G. (2002) (Ed.). Elementi di psicologia giuridica e di diritto psicologico [Juridical psychology and psychological law]. Milan: Giuffrè.
- Gulotta G. (2008) (Ed.). La vita quotidiana come laboratorio di psicologia sociale [The daily life as a laboratory of social psychology]. Milan: Giuffrè.
- Bianchi A., Gulotta G., & Sartori G. (2009), Manuale di neuroscienze forensi [Manual of Forensic Neuroscience], Milano: Giuffrè.
- Gulotta G. e Cutica I. (2009), Guida alla perizia in tema di abuso sessuale e alla sua critica [A guide for the evaluation of sexual abuse and its critic], Milano: Giuffrè.
- Gulotta G., & Tuosto E.M. (2017), Il volto nell'investigazione e nel processo. Nuova fisiognomica forense [New Forensic physiognomic], Milano: Giuffrè.
- Gulotta G. (2018). Le 200 regole della cross-examination. Un’arte scientifica [The 200 rules of cross-examination]. Milan: Giuffrè.
- Gulotta G. (2018). Innocenza e colpevolezza sul banco degli imputati [Innocence and guilt in the dock]. Milan: Giuffrè.
- Gulotta G., Calvi E., & Leardini E. (2018). Il nuovo codice deontologico degli psicologi. Commentato articolo per articolo con decisioni ordinistiche e giurisprudenza ordinaria [The new Code of Ethics for psychologists. Commented article by article with ordinary decisions and case law]. Milan: Giuffrè.
- Gulotta G. (2020). Compendio di psicologia giuridico-forense, criminale e investigativa [Compendium of legal-forensic, criminal and investigative psychology. Update in 2020 with multimedia references]. Milan: Giuffrè.
