= European Mentoring and Coaching Council =

EMCC
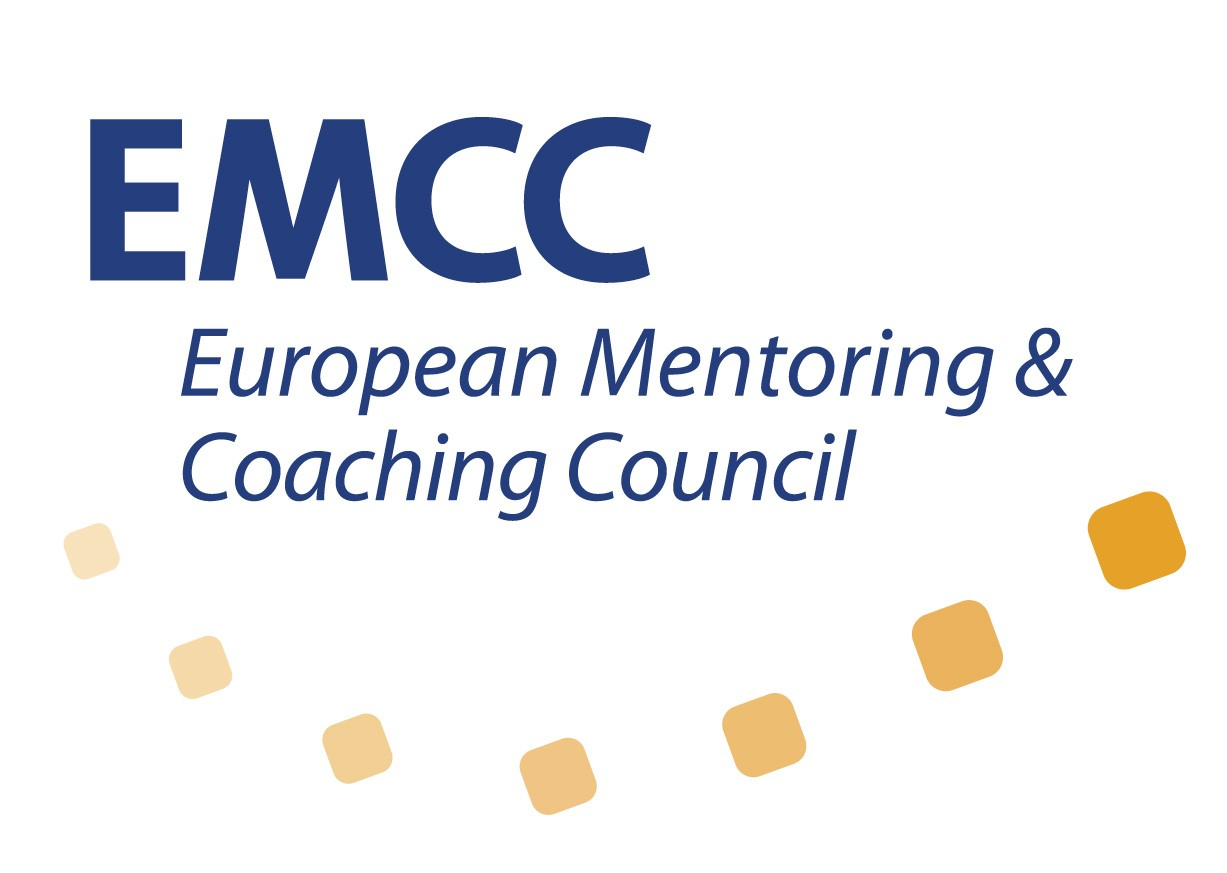
- Formation: 2002
- Headquarters: Brussels, Belgium
- Members: Over 5,000
- Founders: Sir John Whitmore, David Clutterbuck, Eric Parsloe, David Megginson, Julie Hay, Bob Garvey, Nina Lazeron and Kim Langridge
- International President: Mikko Sorvari
- Immediate Past President: Dr Riza Kadilar
- Global Executive Board: Mikko Sorvari, Araceli Canedo Bebbington, Alessandro Pegoraro, Cristina Barradas, Paula Calvo, Cheryl Cooper
- Website: www.emccglobal.org
- Formerly called: European Mentoring Council

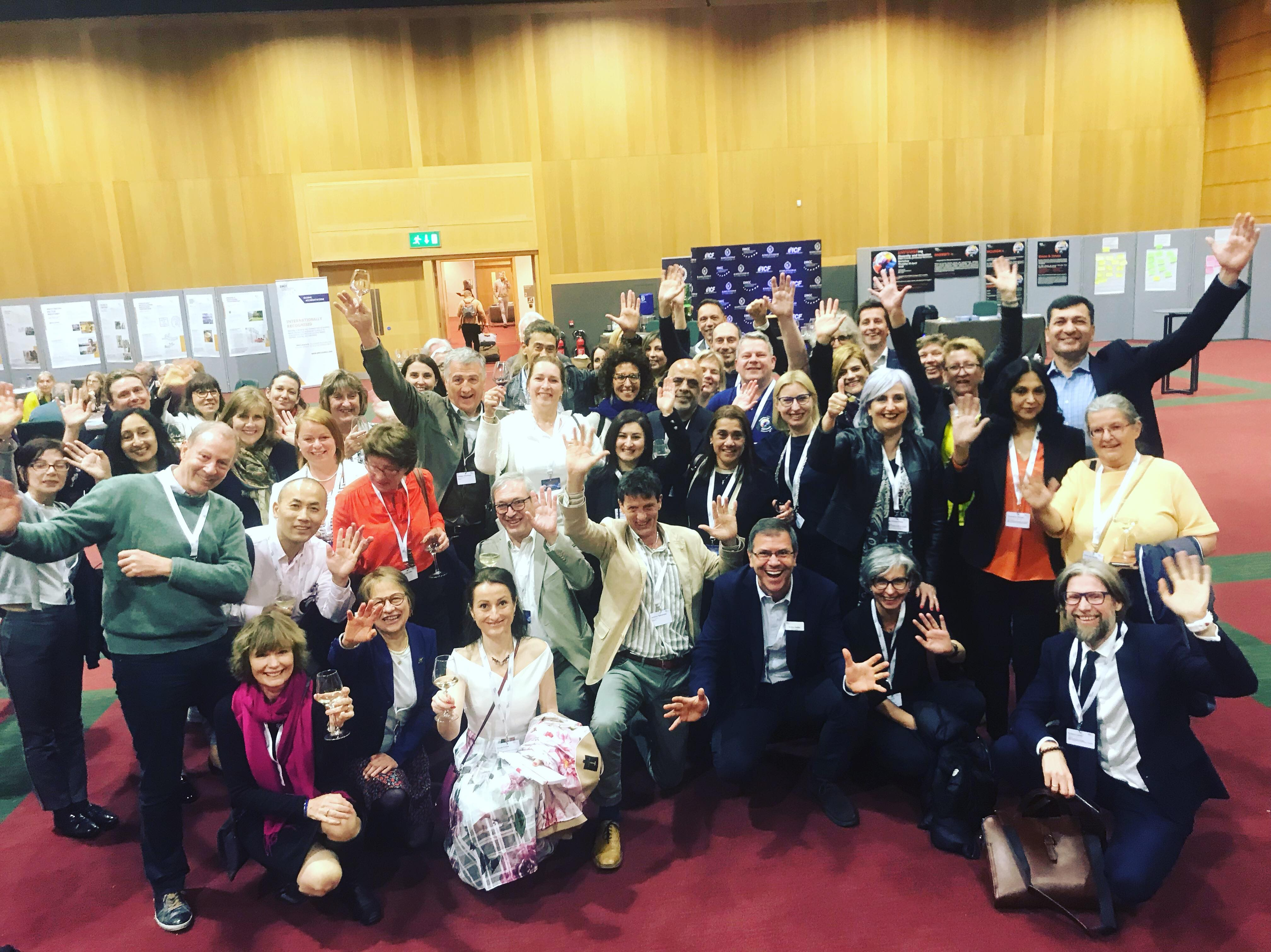
Volunteers from many countries at the 2019 Annual Conference in Dublin, Ireland

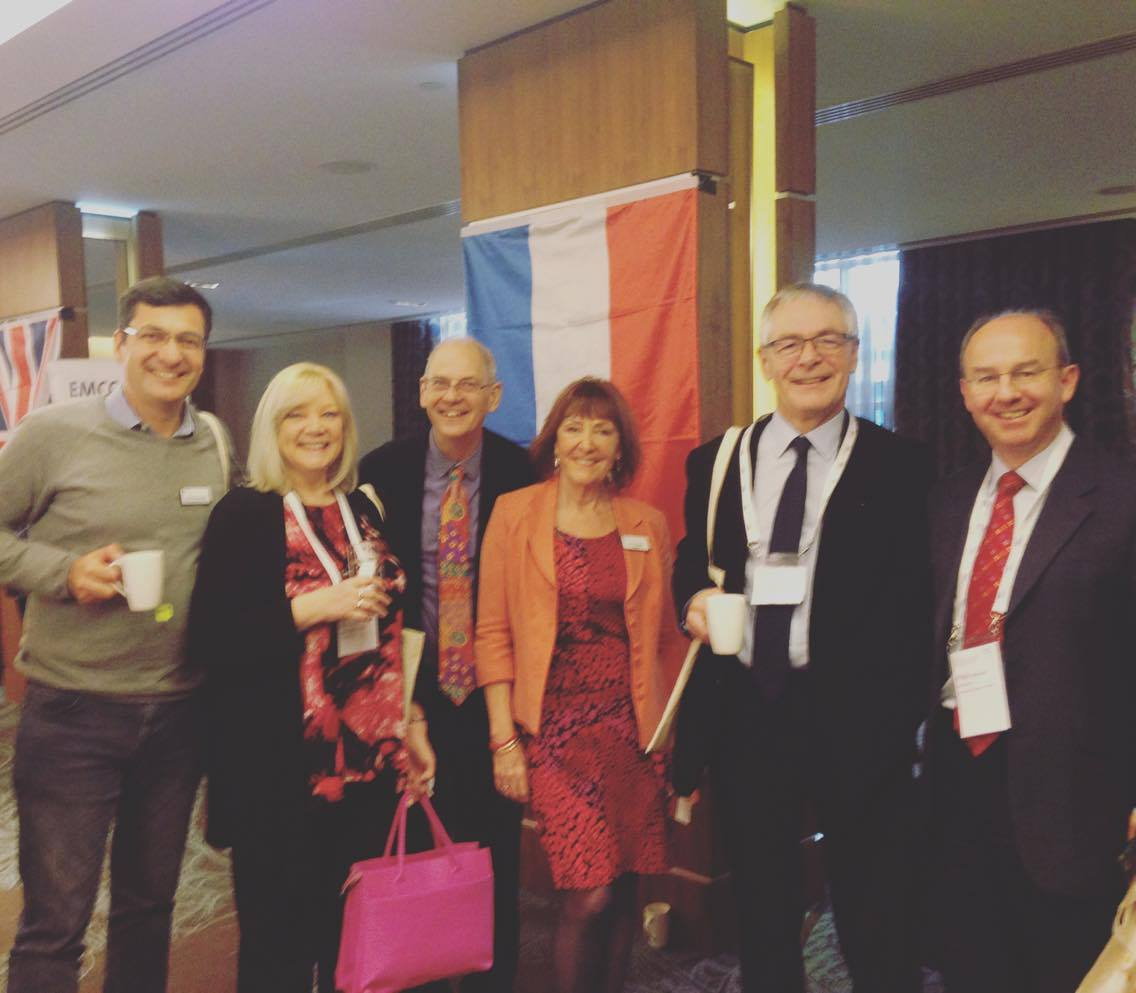
Past-president Lise Lewis with other volunteers incl. Nigel Cumberland at the EMCC Annual 2017 Conference in Edinburgh, Scotland

The European Mentoring and Coaching Council (EMCC) provides coaching and mentoring professional accreditation, as well as support and guidance to the coaching and mentoring profession and for its members. It is one of a small number of such global coaching industry bodies which has led in representing the profession globally as well as within the European Union. It is the body which a large range of European organisations (private & public sector) work with and/or recognise for coaching and mentoring qualifications, accreditations, code of ethics and frameworks.

== Structure ==
The organisation is run on a voluntary, not-for-profit basis, with a small support staff, and has its headquarters in the United Kingdom with a registered address in Brussels, Belgium. In August 2019, it served over 6,000 members located in at least 90 countries, most recently launching in China in November 2019.

== History ==
The EMCC was founded in 1992 as the Mentoring Coaching Council, and renamed to its current name around 2001–2002. It was founded by some of the leading exponents and academics in the fields of mentoring and coaching: Eric Parsloe, Sir John Whitmore, David Clutterbuck, David Megginson and Julie Hay.

== Activities ==
The EMCC has created a range of industry standard frameworks, rules and processes for coaching, mentoring and related supervision, e.g. a code of practice for those practising mentoring and a quoted competency model for coaches and mentors. In certain areas such as in mentoring and coaching supervision the EMCC leads in terms of defining best practice, standards and competency.

The EMCC has organisational members, such as the UK's National Health Service and PricewaterhouseCoopers ("PwC"), in addition to having individual members. Public sector bodies across Europe are also members of, or work with, the EMCC in some way e.g. with its code of ethics. Examples include the Flanders Government in Belgium, the UK's College of Anaesthetists, NHS Wales and the UK's East of England Local Government Association.

EMCC provides independent accreditation for professional coaches, mentors and supervisors, as well as for coaching and mentoring training providers and their programs. Organisations have internal coaching and mentoring programmes where their staff have been through coach training programmes accredited by the EMCC. An example of such an organisation is University College London (UCL) in the UK. This is part of the EMCC's role in creating and maintaining standards of practice in the coaching and mentoring professions, including coaching and mentoring supervision. The EMCC also helps organisations to benchmark their coaching and mentoring programmes. Various universities teach courses in coaching or mentoring which are approved by the EMCC. The University of Warwick in the UK has a code of ethics for its internal coaches and mentors which it states is based on principles laid out by the EMCC.

The EMCC collaborates with the other two lead bodies in its field, the International Coach Federation of the US and the Association for Coaching. In 2011, EMCC along with the International Coach Federation led in the lodging with the European Union of a charter which lays out how the coaching and mentoring profession across Europe can remain a self-regulated profession. EMCC carries out quoted research such as surveys and studies in the mentoring and coaching fields. EMCC also organises research conferences for the mentoring and coaching professions. It was one of the founders in 2012 of the Global Coaching and Mentoring Alliance, a global body which takes a lead role in the mentoring and coaching profession.

The EMCC takes a lead role in developing ethical rules and standards and is one of the bodies in its field recognised as such. In 2016, EMCC and the Association for Coaching launched a global code of ethics which was updated with other signatory bodies in May 2018.

The EMCC hosts annual conferences at varying worldwide locations, with the most recent held in April 2019 in Dublin, Ireland.

The EMCC has a non-for-profit arm, known as Solidarity Coaching, whereby EMCC members are encouraged to provide pro-bono coaching and mentoring to those in need.

The EMCC gives out annual awards in the three distinct fields of coaching, mentoring and supervision (of coaches and mentors) with the 2015 award winner Svetlana Whitener and most recent 2019 award winners Henley Business School's Henley Centre for Coaching and Nigel Cumberland.
