= Inactive, America's Silent Killer =

2024 Canadian health documentary film

- Genre: Documentary
- Directed by: Karl André Talbot; Charles Anderson
- Starring: Experts, educators, policymakers
- Country of origin: Canada
- Original language: English

Production
- Running time: 94 minutes

Original release
- Release: July 20, 2024

Inactive, America's Silent Killer is a Canadian documentary film directed by Karl André Talbot and Charles Anderson which premiered on July 20, 2024. The film explores the growing global epidemic of physical inactivity and its impact on health, particularly among children and adults in developed societies. The film featured politician Robert F. Kennedy Jr. before he was appointed as 26th United States Secretary of Health and Human Services.

== Synopsis ==
The documentary investigates how modern conveniences, digital lifestyles, and sedentary culture are fueling a rise in preventable diseases like obesity, heart disease, and diabetes, particularly in North America. The film also chronicles how automation and screen-centered living have replaced physical movement with convenience and that over 80 million Americans live entirely sedentary lives.

== Cast ==
The film features a wide array of experts, advocates, and public figures who speak on the societal and personal costs of physical inactivity:

- Robert F. Kennedy Jr., American politician, 26th United States Secretary of Health and Human Services
- Luc Robitaille, President LA Kings
- Dave Leduc, World Lethwei Champion
- John Ratey, American Harvard physician
- Hugo Girard, Canadian former strongman
- Isabelle Charest, Olympic athlete
- Romero Britto, Brazilian Artist

== Reception and awards ==
Inactive received critical acclaim at multiple international festivals.

The documentary received over 60 awards and nominations globally:

- Best Documentary Feature – New York International Film Awards (2024)
- Best Producer – Rome International Movie Awards (2024)
- Best Director – San Diego Movie Awards (2024)
- Best Feature Documentary – Sweden Film Awards (2024)
- Best Editor – Tokyo International Cinema Awards (2024)
- Platinum Winner (Documentary Feature) – International Independent Film Awards (2024)
- Best Health Film – World Film Festival, Cannes (2024)
- Best Cinematographer – New York Independent Cinema Awards (2024)
- Best Producer – World Class Film Awards (2024)
- Outstanding Excellence (Health & Documentary) – Documentaries Without Borders International Film Festival (2024)
- Finalist – Rome Prisma Film Awards (2024)
- Nominee – Swiss Alpenglow International Film Festival (Best Director, Best Documentary, 2024)

Nominations:

- Touchstone Independent Film Festival
- LA Film & Documentary Award
- Los Angeles Movie & Music Video Awards
- 7th Art Independent International Film Festival
- New York Independent Cinema Awards
- NYC Independent Film Festival
- Alpine International Film Festival
- Stockholm City Film Festival
- Chicago Indie Film Awards
- Tokyo International Cinema Awards
