= Careers advisory service =

Careers advisory services in the UK are typically organisations that offer advice, guidance and counselling on careers. People may use these services for a number of purposes, such as jobhunting, changing careers, getting a promotion, building career skills, returning to work after a career break and professional development. Career challenges such as these occur for many reasons, including redundancy, motherhood, leaving full-time education, relocation, or simply coming to the end of a work contract.

These services usually employ professional career counsellors, coaches and guides to mentor their clients. In the UK, such professionals might have qualifications from institutes such as the Chartered Institute of Personnel and Development (CIPD), International Coach Federation (ICF) and the British Psychology Society (BPS). The Global Career Development Facilitator is an international certificate held by about 17.500 people (2010) in the United States, Canada, Japan, China, Taiwan, Germany, Romania, Turkey, etc.

The Educational and Vocational Guidance Practitioner (EVGP) is a credential of the International Association for Educational and Vocational Guidance (IAEVG) based on competency inventory. The EVGP is administered and awarded on behalf of the IAEVG by the Center of Credentialing and Education in Greensboro, North Carolina, in the United States, which is an affiliate subsidiary of the American National Board of Certified Counselors.

== History ==
One of the earliest examples of a governmental careers advisory service in the UK came as a result of The Education (Choice of Employment) Act (1910). This gave local education authorities the opportunity to advise juveniles on getting work. Each education authority had an officer who was assigned the specific role of advising juveniles in this manner.

== Types of careers advisory services ==
The UK government’s careers advisory service in England is called the National Careers Service. Most UK universities also have their own in-house careers advisory services for students and alumni. A number of corporate entities also have in-house careers advisory services for their employees. There are privately owned, independent careers advisory services throughout the UK.

In Scotland, the National skills body Skills Development Scotland provide careers advisory services in all maintained secondary schools and in a network of centres across the country.

== Accessing careers advisory services ==
Traditionally, clients of careers advisory services have met up with their career guide/counsellor/coach face-to-face to work through their career challenges. Nowadays, however, careers advisory services may offer remote channels of communication such as careers telephone lines and online tools. There are now private companies that are offering subscription-based online careers information, advice and guidance to schools across the UK. Some careers advisory services also go out into the community by running seminars and workshops.

== Methods and tools ==
Careers advisory services adopt many different techniques and tools to assist their clients, including diagnostic tests and questionnaires, personality assessments, CV writing workshops, mock interviews, "career driver" questionnaires, and vision boards. An established career coaching technique used by many careers advisers is a combination of the GROW model and the 'solution-focused' methodology.

== Standards ==
In the UK, careers advisory services must adhere to British Guidance Council Quality Standards by meeting criteria consisting of several detailed competencies. The performance of staff within these services is also keenly observed by these standards. Further standards and guidelines concentrate on quality of informational material, such as books, manuals and commercial PDFs, as well as learning and delivery outcomes.

== Ireland ==
People in the Republic of Ireland can find careers advisory services through organisations such as the FAS-Irish National Training and Employment Authority. In Northern Ireland, careers guidance services are delivered by the Northern Ireland Careers Service and Educational Guidance Service for Adults.

== See also ==
- Careers advisor
- Career management
- Career counseling
