= Global Career Development Facilitator =

Certification for persons working in career development and advisory fields

Global Career Development Facilitator (GCDF) is a certification from the Center for Credentialing & Education (CCE), a Certification Entity, for persons working in career development and advisory fields. There is an official list of CCE Approved Providers of Training cited below. The certification requires over 120 hours plus educational and experience requirements.

It is an evolution of the Career Development Facilitator (CDF) certification developed in response to a RFP from the National Occupational Information Coordinating Committee (NOICC) during 1992. The winning proposal went to Oakland University in Michigan where the initial development began under the leadership of Howard Splete.

In 2000, when NOICC was eliminated and the employees were split between the USDOL and USDED, the curriculum program was awarded to the National Career Development Association (NCDA) to promote and train practitioners. The Working Ahead curriculum was the second generation, developed at Heldrich Center for Workforce Development, with a linkage the USDOL resources—different from the first generation with greater emphasis towards USDOE resources. Since then, numerous programs have been developed. Graduates from approved programs apply for GCDF certification from the Center for Credentialing in Education (CCE), an affiliate of the National Board for Certified Counselors. The credential recognizes the education and experience of those working in CDF occupations like careers advisory services and employment services. GCDF have successfully completed an approved CDF training program (over 120 hours and maintain continuing education credits or lose certification) and have met and verified specific educational and experience requirements.

== Outline ==
GCDF training is built around 12 core competencies identified by career counseling experts. A period of supervised career facilitation practice also is required prior to certification. GCDF training addresses 12 competency areas:

- Helping Skills
- Labor Market Information and Resources
- Assessment
- Diverse Populations
- Ethical and Legal Issues
- Career Development Models
- Employability Skills
- Training Clients and Peers
- Program Management and Implementation
- Promotion and Public Relations
- Technology
- Supervision

In light of cultural concerns with the development of the GCDF outside the United States, the tasks within each of the competency areas are adapted to meet the needs of a particular country's context.

In the United States, GCDFs are sometimes still recognized as CDFs and work in government agencies and employment offices, in private practice as "coaches," and in colleges and universities. One of the more auspicious places GCDFs are found in the United States is Career One Stop Centers, which are sponsored by the United States Department of Labor. The GCDFs at centers like these work with people who are making career transitions. Also, in 2006, the state of South Carolina passed legislation requiring all middle and secondary schools to have a career facilitation and guidance services available to students.

The GCDF certification program for career guidance providers has been implemented in Bulgaria, Canada, China, Cyprus, Egypt, Germany, Greece, Japan, Macedonia, New Zealand, Portugal, Romania, South Korea, Taiwan, and Turkey. In 2011, training programs have started in El Salvador. Worldwide, about 17,600 GCDF have been certified until 2011.
