= Co-coaching =

Co-coaching is a structured practice of coaching that involves peers alike with the ultimate goal of gaining peer knowledge in learning how to coach or bettering their coaching techniques. This is usually done with one peer being the coach while the other peer is the coachee and vice versa during a set amount of time. This technique enables each peer to receive constructive criticism, or even praise, from one another and also creates a better foundation for coaching. This practice of co-coaching is especially important in the development within management and sports, as leadership skills are a priority.

== Forms ==
There are many different forms of co-coaching that one can practice. One form involves each individual taking turns as the coach in half hour sessions. With this example, the coach coaches the coachee for a half hour, while the coachee is being coached. During this time, the coach practices their coaching techniques, while the coachee ultimately gives feedback to the coach on how they are doing (both good and bad). After the coach finishes, the coach becomes the coachee and the previous coachee becomes the coach. This process of half hour sessions utilizes a quick feedback tool for self development in coaching. Even though this is one form, other forms with the basic technique of a coach and coachee are applicable so long as each person gets their turn and receives feedback on their own performance from the other individual.

== Sociology ==
Learning from another person, and vice versa, has proven to show a sociological impact in the learning stages. As one learns in a co-coaching environment, the person may feel an ease to learning because of a much more relaxed stage, compared to that of only being coached where they may feel more pressure. Since there is an easement in this learning process, information can easily be addressed from person to person. This can have a strong impact on the person when it comes to the learning process, but also it can have its drawbacks. Since it is a more relaxed coaching method, the coach is able to make more mistakes, thus having the potential to hurt or slow down the learning method.

Not only can co-coaching be viewed as a sociological aspect, but it can also be categorized in the behavioral terminology as well. Since the coach and coachee are learning coaching techniques from one another, their behavior to the matter is also being altered. The easiness of each person learning and teaching each other can be an appreciated form that others may use and respond to willingly. This approach allows the user to integrate their technique into something they see fit, while at the same time advancing their own skills and mindset as they become the coach/coachee.

As one might use co-coaching as a personal learning experience, co-coaching can also be used as a tool to study people involving the learning process and a working environment. Social scientists can use co-coaching to study the sociological impact that it has on a person, or a group as a whole. As coaching presents itself as one of the key factors in success, learning the basic techniques to guide another person is essential in the development and achievement that results in coaching. The entire learning process between coaching and learning is what social scientists deem the most important to further advance the learning of human beings on a social status.

Experiments can even be done to determine the best method when dealing with co-coaching. The coach and coachee are valuable resources in understanding the correlation between the two and how each one advances the other. As one would usually prove this to be the case as in a face to face altercation, another way this technique could be distributed and tested could be that of the phone and internet. This way would furthermore advance the social science of learning in a modern-day way and could potentially create a futuristic way in the way people learn.
