= Futel =

Public arts organization providing free telecommunications services

- Formation: 2014; 11 years ago
- Founders: Karl Anderson, Elijah St. Clair
- Headquarters: Portland, Oregon
- Services: Telecommunications
- Website: futel.net

Futel is a public arts organization in Portland, Oregon dedicated to preserving and maintaining public telephone hardware and offering free phone and basic information services. Futel was founded by Karl Anderson, a former software engineer, and Elijah St. Clair.

== Technology ==
Karl Anderson stated that one motivation for the project was to explore the idea of urban furniture. Other reasons were to preserve an important part of hacker history, and to salvage and re-use manufactured items at the end of their lifecycle. The original Futel phones were set up in Portland, Oregon. The organization cleans and repurposes old public payphones which are often salvaged from Craigslist or scrappers. Using interface boxes, they are converted into VoIP phones which are made available publicly, with no cost for phone calls. Anderson has said the service runs on "Asterisk and OpenVPN and a lot of scripts."

The payphones operate using publicly-available internet connections. The phones have automated phone trees and users can make a call to local social services, to a weather forecast line, or access local transit information. Volunteers act as telephone operators, offering information about the Futel service, or are available for conversation. Users using Futel's phones may also access voicemail boxes. The system has a "wildcard line" where people can listen to samples of audio left on the main voicemail line along with commentary from Anderson and others.

== Network ==
In February 2021, there were 10 Futel phones in Portland and 3 in other cities. Phones were set up in Detroit and Ypsilanti, Michigan, and Long Beach, Washington. The organization has provided free phone service for a Portland-area homeless encampment after receiving funding from the Awesome Foundation. In 2019 the organization reported their phones being used to make 12,000 phone calls. Futel also said their usage went up and not down during the first year of the COVID-19 pandemic when they outfitted their phone kiosks with handwashing stations and used volunteers to keep the phones clean.

The project is funded is primarily through grants and is staffed with volunteers. The project has inspired others such as the PhilTel project in Philadelphia and the RandTel project in Randolph, Vermont. Futel publishes a zine called Party Line.
