= Funny Girls (nonprofit program) =

American nonprofit program teaching girls leadership skills through improv comedy

- Formation: 2015; 11 years ago
- Founder: Jenny Raymond
- Type: Youth leadership program
- Headquarters: New York City
- Region served: Worldwide
- Parent organization: Harnisch Foundation
- Website: thehf.org/funny-girls/

Funny Girls is a leadership-development program for girls in third through eighth grade, operated by the Harnisch Foundation, a New York City–based nonprofit organization focused on women's and girls' leadership development. The program uses improvisational comedy exercises to teach leadership skills including self-awareness, collaboration, empathy, and resilience. It was created by Harnisch Foundation executive director Jenny Raymond and launched in 2015; the curriculum was developed with input from the Magnet Theater and the dance company Pilobolus.

Funny Girls has received national media coverage, including a segment on NBC Nightly News and two appearances on The Kelly Clarkson Show, as well as features in Glamour and Romper.

== History ==
The Harnisch Foundation, founded in 1998, has long focused on developing women's leadership skills. According to the foundation, staff repeatedly heard from funded program participants that they wished they had developed leadership skills earlier in life, which prompted the foundation to look at leadership training for younger girls. The foundation began exploring improvisational comedy as a teaching methodology in 2013, drawing on research from Harvard University's Making Caring Common project on the confidence gap between adolescent girls and boys.

In 2015, the foundation contracted the Magnet Theater, a New York City improv theater, and the dance company Pilobolus to support development of a curriculum of improv exercises tied to specific leadership skills: self-awareness, learning agility, collaboration, empathy, creativity, and resilience. The program was piloted in three schools in the New York City metropolitan area in 2016, and formally launched in fall 2017 with partner organizations that, according to the foundation, primarily serve Black and Brown girls in under-resourced communities. NBC Nightly News covered the program in a March 2018 segment filmed in the Bronx, reported by Rehema Ellis.

The program primarily serves girls between the ages of eight and thirteen (grades three through eight), a range the foundation has said was chosen because research shows girls' self-reported confidence declines significantly during this period.

During the COVID-19 pandemic in 2020, the Harnisch Foundation adapted the Funny Girls curriculum for virtual delivery. In 2026, the program partnered with The Second City to launch Funny Girls, Powered by The Second City, in Chicago.

== Curriculum ==
The Funny Girls curriculum organizes improv-based exercises around six leadership skills: self-awareness, learning agility, collaboration, empathy, creativity, and resilience. Press coverage of the program has described it as pairing improv games with structured group reflection, an approach the foundation says is intended to give participants a low-stakes setting to practice skills they can later apply outside the program.

== See also ==
- Harnisch Foundation
- Applied improvisation
- Improvisational theatre
- Girl studies
