= Erm (name) =

Estonian family name

Origin
- Language: Estonian
- Region of origin: Estonia

Erm is predominantly an Estonian language surname. As of 2019, there are 237 men and 256 women in Estonia with the surname Erm and it is ranked as the 219th most common surname for men and the 234th surname for women in Estonia. The surname is the most common in Rapla County.

== People with the surname ==
- Andreas Erm (born 1976), German race walker
- Elisabeth Erm (born 1993), Estonian model
- Johannes Erm (born 1998), Estonian decathlete
- Liivi Erm (born 1953), Estonian sport shooter and coach
- Tõnis Erm (born 1982), Estonian mountain bike orienteer

== People with the given name ==
- Erm Lund (1914–2003), Estonian weightlifter
