= Erm, Netherlands =

Erm
- Village
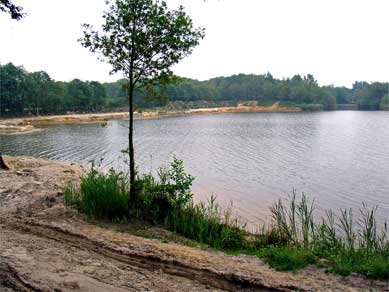
- The Ermezand around Erm

- Location within Drenthe Location within Netherlands
- Coordinates: 52°45′16″N 6°49′1″E
- Country: Netherlands
- Province: Drenthe
- Municipality: De Wolden

Area
  - Total: 0.84 km^{2} (0.32 sq mi)
- Elevation: 17 m (56 ft)

Population (2021)
  - Total: 80
  - Density: 95/km^{2} (250/sq mi)
- Time zone: UTC+1 (CET)
  - Summer (DST): UTC+2 (CEST)
- Postal code: 7843
- Dialing code: 0591

Erm is a village in the Netherlands and is part of the Coevorden municipality in Drenthe.

It was first mentioned between 1267 and 1290 as Erme. The etymology is unknown. It used to be referred to as Voorste Erm to distinguish from Achterste Erm. In 1840, it was home to 400 people. In 1885, a school was built in the village, but closed in 2019.

== See also ==
- Achterste Erm
