= Career guide =

A career guide is a group that provides guidance to people facing a variety of career challenges. These challenges may include (but are not limited to) dealing with redundancy; seeking a course; finding colleges; new job; changing careers; returning to work after a career break; building new skills; personal and professional development; going for promotion; and setting up a business. The common aim of the career guide, whatever the particular situation of the individual being guided, is normally to help that individual gain control of their career and, to some extent, their life.

== Career guide professionals ==
Individuals who work as career guides usually take the approach of combining coaching, mentoring, advising and consulting in their work, without being limited to any one of these disciplines. A typical career guide will have a mixture of professional qualifications and work experiences from which to draw when guiding clients. They may also have a large network of contacts and, when appropriate will put a particular client in touch with a contact relevant to their case. A career guide may work for themselves independently or for one or more private or public careers advisory services. The term 'Career Guide' has been first used by Nav Bharat Times of the Times of India Group under Guidance of Mr. Rakesh Mathur in 1992 in Hindi. It was brand within a brand and First with a Hindi newspaper. In 1996 Dainik Bhaskar, the largest circulated Hindi Newspaper started Career Guide under the Guidance of Mr. Rakesh Mathur, who is a well known Career Guide. The term later used by career consulting firm Position Ignition, which was created in 2009 and has been using the term for their career consultants and career advisors...

== Career guide publications ==
Career guide publications may take a number of forms, including PDFs, booklets, journals or books. A career guide publication will typically be divided up into a number of chapters or segments, each one addressing a particular career issue. Career guides can also focus on a particular industry or profession. For instance, there is 'The fine artist's career guide: making money in the arts and beyond' and 'Professional Pilot's Career Guide'.

== Career guidance standards ==
In Europe, career guidance as a public service is generally expected to meet a number of quality assurance standards. According to these standards, European career guidance should:

- Have regular review periods in which to assess guidance resources and processes
- Be transparent and open
- Create synergy and co-operation between education, training, employment and community sectors
- Ensure consistency between local and regional services so that all citizens are treated equally, regardless of geographical location.
- Strive for continuous improvement of tools, services and products.

== See also ==
- Careers advisor
- Career development
- Career development website
- Career Development Practitioner
- Career counseling
- Career counselors
