= Awesome Foundation =

Nonprofit philanthropic organization in the United States

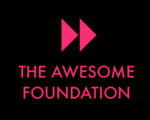
Awesome Foundation Logo

The Awesome Foundation for the arts and sciences is an international network of autonomous 'chapters' (groups) of philanthropists that provide small grants for projects to "people devoted to forwarding the interest of awesomeness in the universe." Most chapters consist of ten trustees who pool contributions in a crowd-funding model and award a $1,000 grant each month to a project and person of their choice. Awesome chapters assume no ownership of the projects they fund and provide the funds with no strings attached.

== History ==
The Awesome Foundation was founded by Tim Hwang in Boston in 2009. Tim developed the idea along with Emily Daniels and Jon Pierce during a road trip to a meet up at AS220 and soon after sent out the call for the first set of trustees. Less than two weeks after the call, the foundation announced its first trustees.

== Notable projects ==
The Awesome Foundation has funded a wide range of projects including the arts, science, and social causes. Examples include creating a free library system in Chicago using birdhouses, growing mushrooms from phonebooks in Ottawa, creating a free phone service for homeless people in Portland, and theatre for street youth in Edmonton.

The inaugural $1,000 grant from the organization went towards the construction of a giant, long hammock in Boston. The resulting final project set a record for the world's largest portable hammock, using curved steel pipes to frame 4,278 feet of rope fashioned from recycled bottles.

A video of Random Swings of Joy, a project funded by the Los Angeles chapter to install $1,000 worth of swings around the city, went viral in June 2011, receiving coverage from the Huffington Post, CBS News, and LAist. Swings have also been installed in the Marshall Islands, Panama, San Francisco, and Toronto. Following the success of the Los Angeles video, Jeff Waldman started a kickstarter project to bring the project to Bolivia, where the median age in 2011 was just 22.5.

== Chapters ==
There are 96 active chapters of the organization in operation. Chapters are based in cities or small locales around the world with four chapters dedicated to specific causes worldwide. Chapters are autonomous, though the original Boston chapter spearheaded an organizational model of consensus-based decision-making. Chapters have access to all of the applications that the Awesome Foundation receives, though many will first look at applicants in their geographic area.

== Institute on Higher Awesome Studies ==
The Awesome Foundation is an autonomous collection of chapters, but is loosely shepherded by the Institute on Higher Awesome Studies. The institute has applied for non-profit 501(c)3 status, and seeks to provide infrastructure (such as the Awesome Foundation website) and spread Awesome as widely as possible.

Awesome Foundation trustees and board members include

- Dan Barber, chef, Awesome Food trustee
- Amanda Hesser, journalist and entrepreneur, Awesome Food trustee
- Jennifer 8. Lee, journalist, Awesome Food trustee and board member of The Institute on Higher Awesome Studies.
- S.I. Newhouse IV, media executive, board member of The Institute on Higher Awesome Studies.
- Alexis Ohanian, entrepreneur and Reddit co-founder, treasurer of The Institute on Higher Awesome Studies.
- Ethan Zuckerman, MIT researcher, board member of The Institute on Higher Awesome Studies.
