= John Ratey =

Psychiatrist and author

John Joseph Ratey (born April 7, 1948) is an American physician who is associate clinical professor of psychiatry at Harvard Medical School.

He is the coauthor, with Edward Hallowell of the books Driven to Distraction, Answers to Distraction, and Delivered from Distraction. Like Hallowell, Ratey believes that he has ADHD but has never been clinically diagnosed.

He is also the coauthor, with Catherine Johnson, of the book Shadow Syndromes: The Mild Forms of Major Mental Disorders That Sabotage Us, 1997, ISBN 978-0553379594.

In 2001 he published the book A User's Guide to the Brain, in which he describes the human brain as a flexible muscle, which works on a "use it or lose it" basis.

He is the author of Spark: The Revolutionary New Science of Exercise and the Brain (2008). This book describes the positive benefits that exercise can have for learning and for people with anxiety, depression and ADHD. It also discusses the neurological effects that occur during exercise as it relates to these conditions.

In 2014 he coauthored the book Go Wild: Free Your Body and Mind from the Afflictions of Civilization with Richard Manning which discusses new evidence & case studies about the benefits of living according to the needs of our core DNA in the areas of: food, exercise, sleep, mindfulness, being outside, being with others, and our central nerve well-being.

Ratey and Hallowell reunited for the book ADHD 2.0: New Science and Essential Strategies for Thriving with Distraction—from Childhood through Adulthood, released and published in 2021. The book serves as an updated review of current research on ADHD or VAST (Variable attention stimulus trait) as described in the book. Current non-medical and medical treatment protocols are reviewed in this book. This includes new empirical research over the last 30 years.

Ratey claims that "No-one is truly normal".

In December 2024, Ratey was featured in the award-winning documentary film Inactive, America's Silent Killer about the growing global epidemic of physical inactivity and its impact on health.
