= Elisabeth Erm =

Estonian model

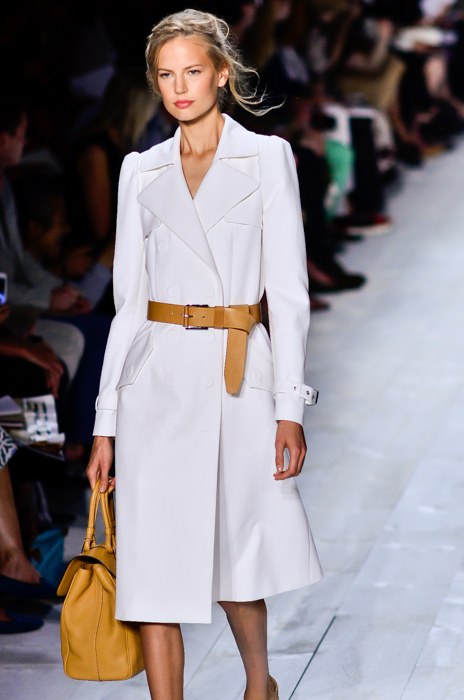
- Born: 1 February 1993 (age 33); Tartu, Estonia
- Occupation: Model
- Modeling information
- Height: 5 ft 10 in (178 cm)
- Hair color: Blonde
- Eye color: Green
- Agency: Wilhelmina Models (New York, London); Elite Model Management (Paris, Copenhagen) d'management group (Milan); LINE UP MODEL MANAGEMENT (Barcelona); Model Management (Hamburg); Public Image Management (Montreal); Vivien's Model Management - Sydney (Sydney)

Elisabeth Erm (born 1 February 1993) is an Estonian model.

== Career ==
She was discovered at age 17, when a model agent approached her and she decided to give it a try. She was then sent to Milan one summer and Istanbul another summer.

In January 2013, Wilhelmina Models asked to meet her and she signed a contract in this agency and started walking for fashion shows during New York Fashion Week, her first one being Lacoste, which she opened. After seven fashion show, her new agency decided to send her in Europe for the Paris, Milan and London fashion weeks where she walked for numerous fashion show including Balenciaga, Balmain, Chanel, Dior, Giorgio Armani and Miu Miu.

She appeared in several adverts for the season fall/winter 13–14, including Balmain photographed by Inez & Vinoodh, Etro by Mario Testino and Moschino by Juergen Teller.

In 2014, she posed for the brands Gucci, Vera Wang and Chloé. In 2015, she advertised Filippa K as well as Carolina Herrera with Joséphine Le Tutour. She was on the cover of Brazil's Harper's Bazaar.
