= Kolb's experiential learning =

Learning theory

David A. Kolb published his experiential learning theory (ELT) in 1984, inspired by the work of the gestalt psychologist Kurt Lewin, as well as John Dewey and Jean Piaget. The approach works on two levels: a four-stage learning cycle and four distinct learning styles. Kolb's experiential learning theory has a holistic perspective which includes experience, perception, cognition and behaviour. It is a method where a person's skills and job requirements can be assessed in the same language that its commensurability can be measured.

== The experiential learning cycle ==
Kolb's four-stage learning cycle, with learning to ride a bike as the example at each stage.

The learning cycle has four stages: concrete learning, reflective observation, abstract conceptualization, and active experimentation. Effective learning can be seen when the learner progresses through the cycle. The learner can enter the cycle at any stage.

The first stage is concrete learning, where the learner encounters a new experience or reinterprets an existing experience. This is followed by reflective observation, where the learner reflects on the experience on a personal basis. After this comes abstract conceptualization, where the learner forms new ideas, or modifies existing abstract ideas, based on the reflections arising from the reflective observation stage. Lastly, in the active experimentation stage the learner applies the new ideas to see if anything changes. This second experience becomes the concrete experience for the beginning of the next cycle. This process can happen over a short or long time.

For example, an engineering student views a lecture (reflective observation), thinks about the ideas therein (abstract conceptualization), does homework problems (active experimentation), and observes demonstrations or performs laboratory experiments (concrete experience).

== Kolb's learning styles ==
Kolb's learning style is explained on the basis of two dimensions: they are how a person understands and processes the information. This perceived information is then classified as concrete experience or abstract conceptualization, and processed information as active experimentation or reflective observation.

Diverging:

Individuals of this kind of learning style look at things in a different perspective. They prefer watching to doing, also they have strong imagination capacity, emotional, strong in arts, prefer to work in groups, open minded to take feedback and they have broad interests in different cultures and people. The learning characteristic is of concrete experience and reflective observation.

Assimilating:

People of this kind of learning style prefer good clear information, they can logically format the given information and explore analytic models. They are more interested in concepts and abstracts than in people. Characteristics include abstract conceptualization and reflective observation.

Converging:

Converging type of learners solve problems. They apply their learning to practical issues. Also, they prefer technical tasks, and they experiment with new ideas. They tend to be unemotional. The learning characteristics are abstract conceptualization and active experimentation.

Accommodating: Individuals with this kind of learning style prefer to do things practically. They are attracted to new challenges and solve problems intuitively. The learning characteristics are concrete experience and active experimentation.

== Educational implications ==
The educational implications of the experiential learning theory are that ELT:

- helps teachers develop more appropriate learning opportunities for target learners;
- helps teachers design activities that will give opportunities to learners to learn in ways that suit the learners' learning styles; and
- focuses on activities that enable learners to go through each of the four stages of the experiential learning cycle.

== Criticisms ==
Some critics have argued that Kolb's Experiential Learning Cycle is too simplistic in nature and fails to capture the importance of observation; it also only works in abstract isolation. This has led Ryder and Downs (2022) to argue for an approach that embraces change and emphasises the orientation of the observer as critical to decision-making both in education and work. For this approach, they advocate for the OODA loop as an alternative model.

== See also ==
- Learning theory (education)
- Experiential learning
