= Thomas J. Leonard =

Life coach

Thomas J. Leonard (July 31, 1955 – February 11, 2003) was a personal coach. He was an EST employee in the 1980s and founded Coach U, the International Coach Federation, Coachville, and the International Association of Coaching

== Books ==
- Working Wisdom
- The Portable Coach, Scribner, August 1998, ISBN 978-0-684-85041-2
- Becoming a Coach
- Simply Brilliant, ISBN 978-1-929668-00-7
- Coaching Forms Book
- The Distinctionary
- 28 Laws of Attraction, Scribner, December 2007, ISBN 978-1-4165-7103-2

== See also ==
- Werner Erhard and Associates
- Erhard Seminars Training
- Landmark Worldwide
