= Emissions Reduction Market System =

The Emissions Reduction Market System (ERMS) is a regulatory plan designed to curb emissions of volatile organic material (VOM) in Illinois. The ERMS operates under the principles of a cap and trade market system.

== Application and management ==
The ERMS applies only to stationary sources that produce over 10 tons of VOMs during a given compliance period. The compliance period lasts from the beginning of May to the end of September each year as this is the time period in which the air quality tends to be the lowest. The region managed by ERMS, referred to as a non-attainment area for its substandard ozone quality, encompasses the greater metropolitan area of Chicago. In total, the non-attainment area comprises six counties and three townships in the northeast corner of Illinois. Though the ERMS wasn't fully operational until May 2000, the majority of sources were reporting emissions on schedule by 1998.

== Creation and purpose ==
The ERMS was created by the Illinois Environmental Protection Agency (IEPA) in response to the Clean Air Act Amendments of 1990. Under the amendments, the Chicago metropolitan area was mandated to reduce ozone forming VOM emissions by 9% every 3 years from 1996 until the area reached attainment. Wishing to reduce emissions without imposing the economic burdens associated with the traditional command and control approach, The IEPA created this market-based system.

== Allotment trading units ==
The ERMS issues allotment trading units (ATUs) which are equivalent to an emission permit worth 200 pounds of VOM. Like most cap and trade programs, any source that exceeds its permitted emissions faces monetary penalties. Unlike similar programs, however, ATUs that go unused in a given season can be held by the emitter for a total of 2 years. The program also contains a failsafe for emitters called the Alternative Compliance Market Account (ACMA). This account exists as a seller of last resort in the event of an emitter being unable to purchase the required amount of ATUs on the open market. It has had minimal use in the 11 years of ERMS activity. Generally, the ERMS is considered a relatively small trading scheme. In the 2010 season, 234 sources participated in the system while 53 transactions were completed and 8740 ATUs were traded.

== Results ==
The first seasons of operation saw the average ATU price drop from $75.87 to $18.75, or 25% of their initial value. Since then, the price has fluctuated modestly and ended at $20.10 in 2010. Furthermore, 58, 834 ATUs expired without use. This accounts for 58.6% of the total ATUs allotted in 2010. These figures point to an inherent lack of scarcity in the system. While numerous reasons have been put forth, they generally point to inflated baseline emissions and subsequent over-allotment.

Ultimately, even if the ERMS cannot be considered an outright success, it provides a wealth of information for those wishing to emulate the plan. Representatives from the region of Tuscany, Italy and Santiago, Chile had been inquiring about the program as far back as 2004. Furthermore, the European Union Emissions Trading Scheme has been plagued by similar outcomes. Still, supporters argue that reduction targets were met and in a much less costly manner than what would have occurred under command and control methods.
