= International Coaching Federation =

Nonprofit organization

- Abbreviation: ICF
- Formation: 1995; 31 years ago
- Type: Professional Association Organization
- Headquarters: Lexington, Kentucky
- Region served: Worldwide
- Services: Certification, Industry standards, Conferences, Publications
- Members: 50,000+ (January 2022)
- Founder: Thomas J. Leonard
- CEO: Magdalena Nowicka Mook
- Website: coachingfederation.org

The International Coaching Federation (ICF) is a non-profit organization dedicated to professional coaching. ICF is an accrediting and credentialing body for both training programs and coaches.

== Overview ==
ICF has over 50,000 members in over 150 countries and territories worldwide as of January 2022.

As of March 2021, there were over 33,000 certified coaches who hold one of three ICF credentials: 18,628 Associate Certified Coaches (ACC); 13,332 Professional Certified Coaches (PCC); and 1,327 Master Certified Coaches (MCC).

== History ==
Founded in 1995, ICF campaigns for professional standards within the coaching profession, and provides independent certification for professional coaches (through three ICF credentials) and coach training programs (through ICF Training Program Accreditation).

In 2011, the ICF and the European Mentoring and Coaching Council (EMCC) led in the lodging with the European Union a charter which lays out how the coaching and mentoring profession across Europe can remain a self-regulated profession.
