= Edward Hallowell (psychiatrist) =

American psychiatrist

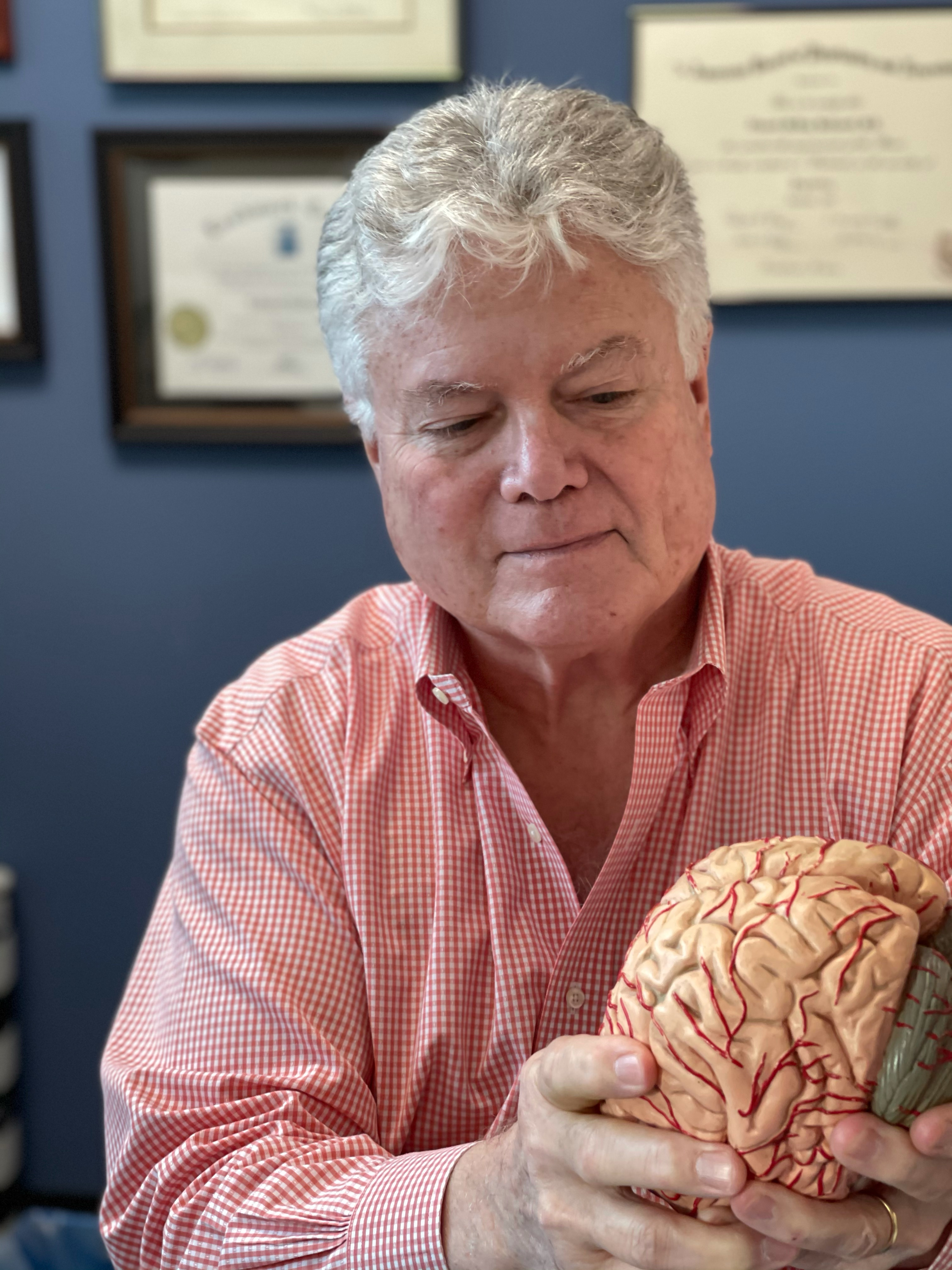
- Hallowell talking about the brain
- Born: December 2, 1949 (age 76)
- Education: Phillips Exeter Academy; Harvard College (BA); Tulane University School of Medicine (MD)
- Occupation: Psychiatrist
- Medical career
- Research: ADHD
- Notable works: Distraction series

Edward McKey Hallowell (born December 2, 1949) is an American psychiatrist, speaker, New York Times best-selling author and podcast host. He specializes in ADHD (attention deficit hyperactivity disorder). Hallowell is the founder of the Hallowell ADHD Centers, and is the author of 20 books, including the "Driven to Distraction" book series, co-authored with John Ratey.

== Early life and education ==
Hallowell grew up in Chatham, Massachusetts. His father had bipolar disorder and initially received psychiatric treatment for misdiagnosed schizophrenia. His mother remarried and subsequently divorced an abusive alcoholic. Hallowell had two brothers.

Hallowell is an alumnus of Phillips Exeter Academy, Harvard College and Tulane University School of Medicine. He received a bachelor's degree in English from Harvard College and a medical degree from the Tulane University School of Medicine. Hallowell completed his residency in adult and child psychiatry at Harvard Medical School.

== Career ==
Hallowell has been treating people of all ages with ADHD since 1981, and has stated that he has dyslexia and ADHD, which is self-diagnosed. His approach to the condition uses a strength-based model—developed with Driven to Distraction co-author John Ratey—that is based on the tenets of positive psychology and takes a more holistic view of ADHD, rather than seeing it purely as a disorder with negative symptoms. This model was new to the field.

Using this treatment model, Hallowell set up the ADHD Hallowell Centers. There are currently six locations in the United States, including New York City, Seattle and Boston.

Hallowell states that there are four key aspects to treatment for ADHD: 1) learning as much as possible about the condition and understanding the specific symptoms that a person has; 2) getting a coach to help with the executive functioning type tasks that people with ADHD tend to struggle with; 3) lifestyle changes, including good nutrition, sleep and physical exercise; and 4) medication, if it is beneficial for the individual. Hallowell has stated that "the biggest problem we face is ignorance and stigma. The contentiousness around ADHD is simply rooted in ignorance." Hallowell believes the symptoms of ADHD are due to "biochemical differences in the brain" that lead to a "chemical imbalance", which can be treated with medication.

Hallowell says once stimulant drugs work "They work like eyeglasses. Suddenly you can see". Hallowell believes that Adderall and other stimulant drugs are safer than aspirin. He also believes Coffee is more toxic than Adderall. Hallowell has been a paid consultant for McNeil Pediatrics, who make stimulant drugs including Adderall and Concerta.

Hallowell supports the official and updated definition of ADHD developed by the DSM-5 Task Force. ADHD does not always include hyperactivity, and Hallowell says that this type, known as ADHD Inattentive Type, occurs frequently in women. In 2020, Hallowell said that the term Attention Deficit Hyperactivity Disorder is a horrible term, and that "individuals with ADHD don't have a deficiency of attention, but an abundance of it." Hallowell claims that ADHD does not always include hyperactivity but can include an inability to follow through on assignments at work or at school, misplacing things, avoiding tasks or getting distracted easily. Hallowell also believes that hyperactivity can be a misleading symptom and can lead to individuals going undiagnosed in some cases. Hallowell has described the ADHD brain as a Ferrari engine with bicycle brakes.

Hallowell and Ratey created a new term, VAST (Variable Attention Stimulus Trait), to describe ADHD more effectively, and wrote about this extensively in their new book, published in January 2021. VAST derives from the fact that people with ADHD are drawn to high stimulation situations and their attention varies based on the level of stimulation within the situation. Hallowell also created the term sensitive euphoria: when individuals with ADHD are criticized or rejected, they typically wilt, while forms of encouragement and recognition help them immensely.

Hallowell has written over 20 books on ADHD and other psychological topics, writes a monthly blog about the topic and is a regular contributor to ADDitude Magazine. He is on the ADHD Medical Review Panel for ADDitude. In 2018, he was awarded the National Alliance on Mental Illness' Leader of Mental Health Awareness Award.

According to Sophie McBain in a New Statesman article in 2022, Hallowell was part of a small circle of professionals, drug companies and advocacy groups who pushed for a loosening of the diagnostic criteria, fuelling a precipitous rise in ADHD diagnosis rates in the US.

== Sexually inappropriate behavior and remarks ==
In May 2015, Hallowell was charged with sexually groping a make up artist in 2014. The case was dismissed following pre-trial probation.

In October 2024, Hallowell was admonished by the Massachusetts Board of Registration in Medicine for making sexually inappropriate remarks towards a patient and his partner. Hallowell himself "admitted in a Consent Order that he directed two sexually inappropriate comments towards a patient and his partner. These comments were unrelated to treatment and shocked and offended the patient and his partner".

== TV appearances ==
Hallowell has appeared on television several times discussing ADHD. He has appeared on 20/20, 60 Minutes, the BBC, CNN, Dateline, Good Morning America, The Jane Pauley Show, The Oprah Winfrey Show, The Dr. Phil Show, PBS, The Today Show, The View, and many local news programs. He also has appeared on the Revolution show with Ty Pennington and Jennifer Ashton. In this he asked an audience member named "Alicia" six questions. Based on her answers, he concluded that she has ADHD and said stimulant medication was safer than aspirin.

== Personal life ==
Hallowell lives in the Boston, Massachusetts, area with his wife, Sue, a social worker. They have three adult children.

== Books ==
=== Distraction series ===
- Driven to Distraction (Revised): Recognizing and Coping with Attention Deficit Disorder Paperback – September 13, 2011 [1st pub. 1994], with John Ratey
- Delivered from Distraction: Getting the Most out of Life with Attention Deficit Disorder – December 27, 2005, with John Ratey
- Answers to Distraction – January 12, 2010, with John Ratey
- Married to Distraction: How to Restore Intimacy and Strengthen Your Partnership in an Age of Interruption – February 8, 2011 [1st pub. March 16, 2010], with Sue Hallowell
- Driven to Distraction at Work: How to Focus and Be More Productive – January 6, 2015
- ADHD 2.0: New Science and Essential Strategies for Thriving with Distraction – From Childhood Through Adulthood – January 12, 2021, with John Ratey

=== Other books ===
- Finding the Heart of the Child (1993) Essays on Children, Families, and Schools – January 1, 1997
- When You Worry About The Child You Love (1997) – August 27, 1997
- Worry: Hope and Help for a Common Condition – September 14, 1998
- Connect: 12 Vital Ties That Open Your Heart, Lengthen Your Life, and Deepen Your Soul – April 1, 2001
- Human Moments: How to Find Meaning and Love in Your Everyday Life – September 1, 2001
- Shine: Using Brain Science to Get the Best from Your People – January 13, 2011
- The Childhood Roots of Adult Happiness: Five Steps to Help Kids Create and Sustain Lifelong Joy – August 26, 2003
- A Walk in the Rain With a Brain – Picture Book, September 28, 2004
- Dare to Forgive: The Power of Letting Go and Moving On– January 15, 2006
- Crazy Busy: Overstretched, Overbooked, and About to Snap! Strategies for Handling Your Fast-Paced Life – March 27, 2007
- Superparenting for ADD: An Innovative Approach to Raising Your Distracted Child – February 23, 2010
- Because I Come From A Crazy Family (The Making of a Psychiatrist) – June 12, 2018
