= Interpersonal influence =

Interpersonal influence is a type of social influence which results from group members encouraging, or forcing, conformity while discouraging, and possibly punishing, nonconformity. It is one of three types of social influences that lead people to conform to the majority, or the group's norms. The other two types are influence are informational influence and normative influence.

The effects of interpersonal influence were well documented through Schachter's 1951, experiments involving three confederates in an all-male discussion group. One confederate was the deviant, who was assigned to always disagree with the majority; the next was the slider, who disagreed initially but was told to eventually conform; and the last was the mode, whose task was to consistently agree with the majority. Schachter was interested specifically in how the group would pressure the deviant to conform. He found that communication with the deviant increased steadily over the course of the discussion, but in more cohesive groups, the deviant became rejected.

There is also a difference between inclusive and exclusive reactions toward the dissenter and therefore different consequence. In an inclusive reaction, the majority and minority argue their opinions, but the minority is still considered to be part of the group. In contrast, in an exclusive reaction, communication diminishes, hostility increases, and the minority becomes rejected entirely. Studies have shown that the affective distress cause by such ostracism and rejection linger long after the event has occurred, and even if the rejected individual is later accepted back into the group.

Interpersonal rejection is a consequence of interpersonal influence. For example, the deviant in this study was rated the lowest by fellow group members on likability and was assigned more menial tasks. Additionally, the slider was less well liked than the mode, despite listening to reason and shifting opinions. This shows that any amount of disagreement with a majority can lower one's chances of acceptance. Those with low self-esteem have been found to respond worse to rejection, likely due to self-blame attributions.

Black-sheep effect is another consequence of interpersonal influence, and occurs when group members who perform an offensive behavior are judged more harshly by their ingroup than an outgroup member who does the same.
