= Caning in Malaysia =

Corporal punishment

Caning, also referred to as whipping in traditional British legislative terminology, is used as a form of corporal punishment in Malaysia. It can be divided into at least four contexts: judicial/prison, school, domestic, and sharia/syariah. Of these, the first is largely a legacy of British colonial rule in the territories that are now part of Malaysia, particularly Malaya.

Judicial caning, the most severe of the four forms of corporal punishment in Malaysia, can be ordered as part of a criminal sentence imposed by civil courts on male convicts. Always ordered in addition to a prison sentence for adult offenders, it is inflicted with a long and thick rattan cane on the prisoner's bare buttocks in an enclosed area in the prison. Convicts who were not sentenced to caning earlier in a court of law may also be punished by caning in the same way if they commit aggravated offences while serving time in prison.

In schools, students may be caned with a light rattan cane on the buttocks over clothing or the palm of the hand for serious misconduct. Although legally only boys can be caned, the caning of girls is common in Malaysia. In the domestic setting, it is legally and culturally acceptable for parents to punish their children with a light rattan cane for misbehaviour. Sharia courts can sentence Muslim men and women (including Muslim foreigners) to caning for committing certain offences. This form of caning is much less severe compared to judicial caning and it is designed to humiliate the offender rather than to inflict physical pain.

Malaysia has been criticised by human rights groups for its use of judicial caning, which Amnesty International claims "subjects thousands of people each year to systematic torture and ill-treatment, leaving them with permanent physical and psychological scars".

== Judicial caning ==
=== History ===
Caning, as a form of legally sanctioned corporal punishment for convicted criminals, was first introduced by the British Empire in the 19th century. It was formally codified under the Straits Settlements Penal Code Ordinance IV in 1871.

In that era, offences punishable by caning were similar to those punishable by birching or flogging (with the cat o' nine tails) in England and Wales. They included robbery, aggravated forms of theft, burglary, assault with the intention of sexual abuse, a second or subsequent conviction of rape, a second or subsequent offence relating to prostitution, and living on or trading in prostitution. In 1953, the Criminal Justice Act 1953 was passed to abolish the use of cat o' nine tails in Malaya, and mandated that the sentence of whipping can only be carried out by rattan.

The practice of judicial caning was retained as a form of legal penalty after the Federation of Malaya declared independence from Britain in 1957. It is largely a legacy of British colonial rule and has nothing to do with "Islamic justice" even though the majority of the Malaysian population are Muslims.

=== Legal basis ===
Sections 286–291 of the Criminal Procedure Code lay down the procedures governing caning, which is referred to as "whipping" in the Code in accordance with traditional British legislative terminology. The procedures include the following:

- The offender cannot be sentenced to more than 24 strokes of the cane in a single trial. In the case of a juvenile offender, the number of strokes is capped at 10.
- The rattan cane used shall not be more than 0.5 inches (1.27 cm) in diameter.
- In the case of a juvenile offender or a person sentenced to caning for committing relatively less serious offences (e.g. white-collar offences), the caning is inflicted in the way of school discipline using a light rattan cane.
- Caning is not to be carried out by instalments. If an offender is sentenced to caning in two or more separate trials, the total number of strokes may be inflicted in a single session if it does not exceed 24.
- A medical officer is required to be present and to certify that the offender is in a fit state of health to undergo the punishment.

Boys aged between 10 and 18 may be sentenced to a maximum of 10 strokes with a light rattan cane.

=== Exemptions ===
The following groups of people shall not be caned:

- Women
- Men above the age of 50, except those convicted of rape
- Men sentenced to death

=== Offences punishable by caning ===
Malaysian criminal law prescribes caning for a wide range of offences, always in addition to a prison term and never as a punishment by itself except for juvenile offenders in some cases. Caning is usually a routine punishment for serious offences, notably those involving rape, violence or drug trafficking, but also for lesser offences such as illegal immigration, bribery, and criminal breach of trust. Every year, thousands of illegal immigrants (mostly from Indonesia) are briefly incarcerated, punished with one or two strokes of the cane, and then deported. In November 2003, illegal moneylending was added to the list of offences punishable by caning.

Malaysians have called for caning to be imposed as a punishment for illegal bike racing, snatch theft, traffic offences, deserting one's wife, perpetrating get-rich-quick schemes, and vandalism (cf. Singapore's Vandalism Act). However, these offences still remain outside the list of offences punishable by caning.

=== Statistics ===
Although the Malaysian government does not release overall figures of the number of offenders sentenced to caning every year, in 2010 Amnesty International used statistical sampling to estimate that as many as 10,000 prisoners were caned in a year.

In 2004, the Malaysian Deputy Home Affairs Minister stated that 18,607 undocumented migrants were caned in the first 16 months since caning for immigration offences started in August 2002. In 2009, the Malaysian parliament revealed 34,923 foreigners were caned between 2002 and 2008. Over 60 percent of them were Indonesians, 14 percent were Burmese, and 14 percent were Filipinos.

=== Caning officers ===
The criteria for the selection of caning officers are very stringent, with maybe only two out of every 30 applicants being chosen. Those selected undergo special training. They are trained to swing the cane at a speed of at least 160 km/h (99 mph) and produce a force upon impact of at least 90 kg (198 lb). In 2005, they were paid 10 ringgit (about US$2.60 or 2.10€) for each stroke as compared to three ringgit previously.

=== The cane ===
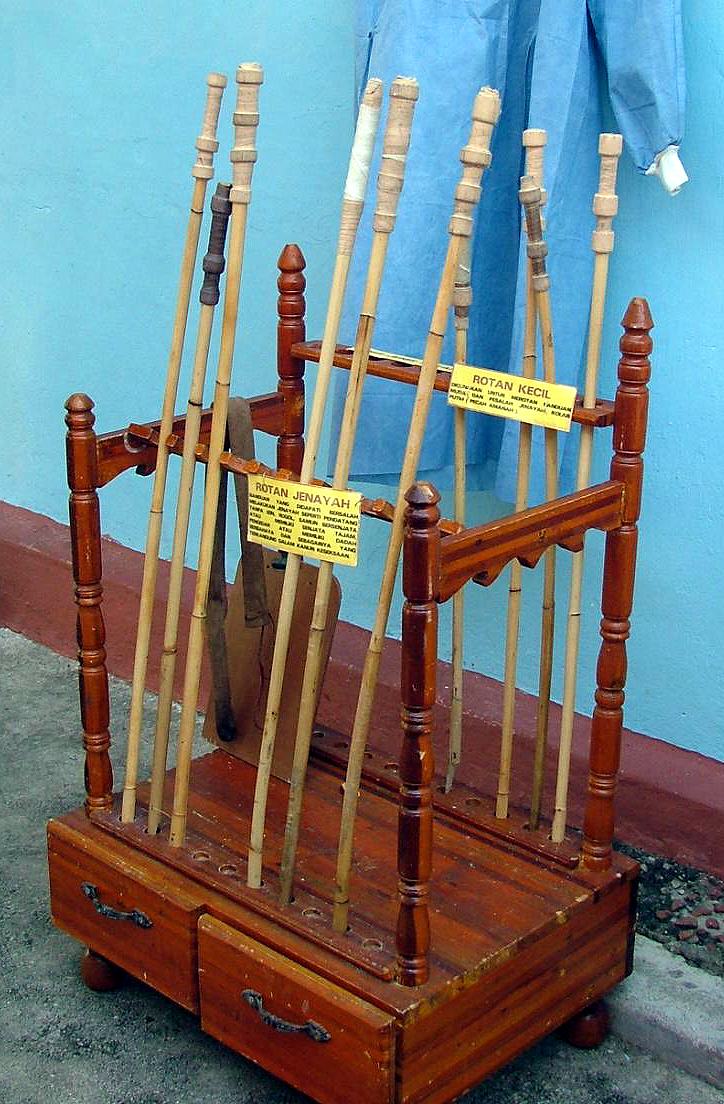
Two types of judicial canes: The thicker canes are in the front row while the lighter canes are in the back row.

Two types of rattan canes are used for judicial caning:

- Thinner cane, used on white-collar criminals who committed offences such as bribery and criminal breach of trust.
- Thicker cane, used on offenders who committed serious and violent crimes, such as drug trafficking, causing grievous hurt, armed robbery and rape.

The thicker cane is about 1.09 m (3.6 ft) long and 1.25 cm (0.49 in) thick.

=== Administration procedure ===
==== For adult offenders ====
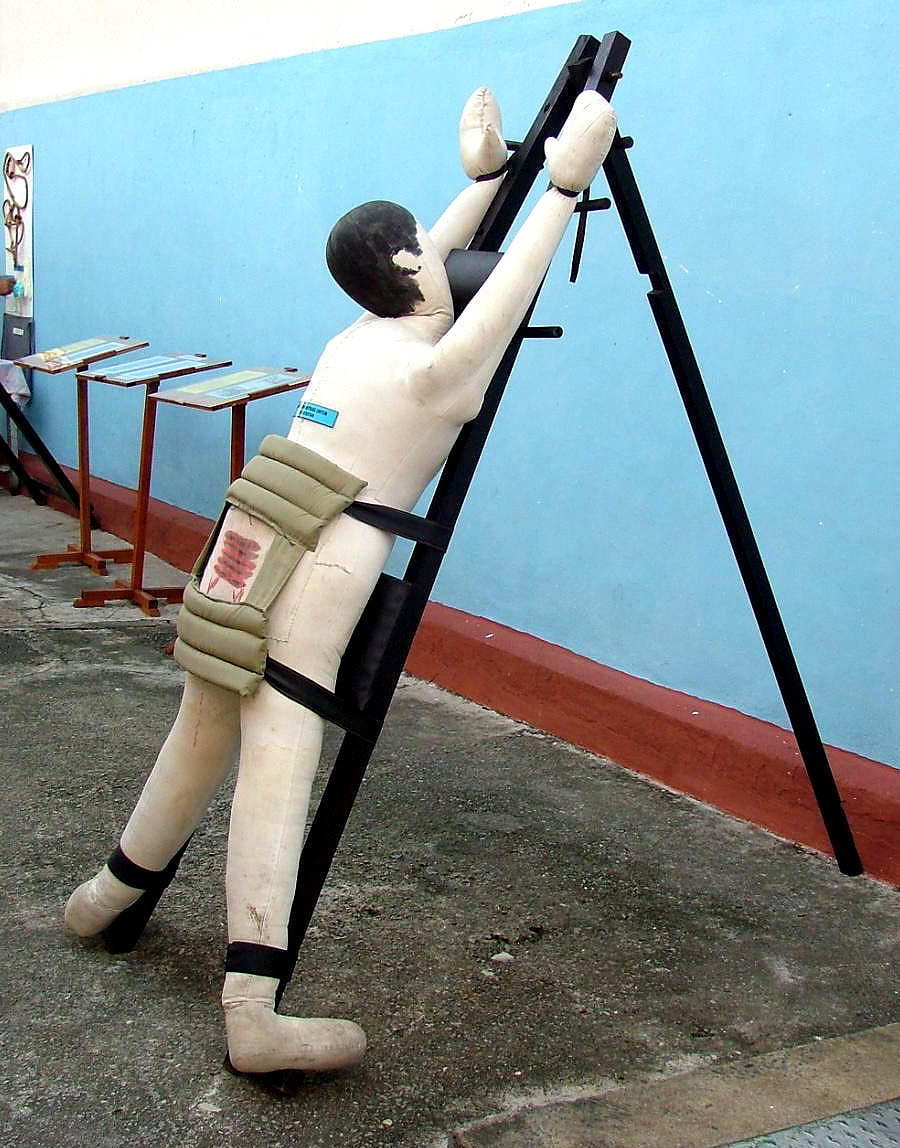
A mannequin tied to an A-shaped frame. Note the "torso shield" that covers the lower back and upper thighs while leaving the buttocks exposed.

The punishment cannot be carried out until after seven days from the date when the offender was sentenced to caning. If the offender made an appeal to an appellate court, the sentence must be confirmed by the court before it can be carried out. The punishment cannot be carried out within 24 hours of the sentence being passed except by special order in case of emergency.

The offender is not told in advance when he will be caned; he is notified only on the day his sentence is to be carried out or, in some instances, one day before. The uncertainty often puts offenders through much fear and psychological suffering.

On the day, a medical officer inspects him and determines whether he is in a fit state of health to undergo the punishment. If the medical officer certifies that the offender is not in a fit state of health to be caned, the offender will be sent back to the court for the caning sentence to be remitted or converted to a prison term of up to 24 months, in addition to the original prison term he was sentenced to.

If the medical officer certifies the offender fit, the offender is then confined in a holding area with other prisoners who are going to be caned on the same day. The offender is escorted to the caning area when it is his turn to be punished. The caning is conducted in an open yard surrounded by walls in the prison, out of the view of the public and other prisoners. The prison director oversees the caning, along with the medical officer and other prison officers. He reads the terms of punishment to the offender and asks him to confirm the number of strokes.

While the prison staff present at the caning scene are usually all men, sometimes female doctors from government hospitals might be ordered to participate because it was part of their duties as government employees.

In practice, the offender is required to strip completely naked for the punishment. However, he may be given a loincloth or a sarong to cover his genitals.

After he confirms the number of strokes, he is taken to an A-shaped wooden frame, to which he is secured throughout the duration of the punishment. The front of his body rests against a padded cushion on the frame while his arms are tied above his head and his legs spread apart and secured tightly to the frame (see the mannequin in the adjacent picture). A "torso shield" is fastened around his body, exposing only his buttocks while protecting his lower back (the kidneys and lower spine area) and upper thighs (near the genitals) from any strokes that might land off-target. A prison officer stands in front of the offender and wraps his hands around the offender's head in case he jerks back his head and injures his neck. The caning is administered on the offender's bare buttocks. The caning officer stands beside the frame and delivers the number of strokes specified in the sentence at intervals of about 30 seconds. To ensure maximum effect, he ensures the tip of the cane comes in contact with the target area and drags it quickly along the skin to break it.

Sanitary procedures are observed as a precaution against HIV transmissions. Each cane is soaked in antiseptic before use to prevent infection. In the case of an HIV-positive subject, the cane used is burnt after the punishment is over. Caning officers also sometimes wear protective smocks, gloves and goggles.

==== For juvenile offenders ====
The Criminal Procedure Code stipulates that juvenile offenders (below the age of 18) sentenced to caning shall receive the punishment "in the way of school discipline using a light rattan cane." The legal limit for juveniles is 10 strokes. According to press reports from between 2012 and 2014, the punishment is administered by a police officer inside the courtroom in full view of everyone present there, immediately after the judge announced the sentence. The offender keeps his clothes on and receives the punishment on the buttocks over clothing while bending over a table. A medical officer is also present to supervise the punishment and ensure safety.

A lawyer who represented a juvenile offender who was sentenced to public caning in court defended the punishment by saying that it was part of a plea bargain with the prosecution to ensure that the offender would be punished "in the way of school discipline" instead of the manner in which adult offenders are caned in prison. She also added that such punishments are common in Malaysia and that she had witnessed six such cases in her five years of legal practice. However, another lawyer said there were errors in the way the sentence was ordered and carried out.

=== Medical treatment and the effects ===
A 2010 report by Amnesty International described the severity of judicial caning as follows, "In Malaysian prisons specially trained caning officers tear into victims' bodies with a metre-long cane swung with both hands at high speed. The cane rips into the victim's naked skin, pulps the fatty tissue below, and leaves scars that extend to muscle fibre. The pain is so severe that victims often lose consciousness."

As the caning officers are trained to strike the target and drag the tip of the cane across the wound, the laceration will cause the skin to come off immediately and thus draw blood. Due to the physical pain and intense fear, the offender may lose control over his urinary and bowel functions, or even lose consciousness altogether. Offenders have variously described the pain as "intense", "burning", "being bitten by red ants", "like an electric shock", "worst pain in my life", etc. In any case, judicial caning usually leaves permanent scars on the offender's buttocks.

After the caning, the offender is released from the frame and taken to the prison clinic for medical treatment.

=== Malaysian caning videos ===
In August 1991, Malaysia's TV3 broadcast a two-part documentary on prison life shot by Majalah Tiga at Kajang Prison and Pudu Prison with permission from the Malaysian Prison Department. The second part focused on corporal and capital punishment. Wan Zaleha Radzi, the documentary's anchorperson, said that her team filmed an actual caning scene. However, direct camera shots of the cane striking prisoners' bare buttocks were edited out from the telecast because they were deemed too sensitive for viewers.

In the mid 2000s, the Malaysian government released three graphic videos featuring several genuine judicial canings, ranging from one stroke to 20 strokes. The canings were filmed in Seremban Prison near the national capital, Kuala Lumpur.

=== Comparison of judicial caning in Brunei, Malaysia and Singapore ===
Judicial caning is also used as a form of legal punishment for criminal offences in two of Malaysia's neighbouring countries, Brunei and Singapore. There are some differences across the three countries.

Context/Policy	Country		
Context/Policy	Brunei	Malaysia	Singapore
Sharia caning	In practice		Not in practice
Juveniles	Local courts may order the caning of boys below the age of 16. Juveniles are punished "in the way of school discipline" with their clothes on.		Only the High Court may order the caning of boys below the age of 16.
Age limit	Men above the age of 50 cannot be sentenced to caning.	Men above the age of 50 cannot be sentenced to caning. However, the law was amended in 2006 such that men convicted of sex offences may still be sentenced to caning even if they are above the age of 50. In 2008, a 56-year-old man was sentenced to 57 years jail and 12 strokes of the cane for rape.	Men above the age of 50 cannot be sentenced to caning.
Maximum no. of strokes per trial	24 strokes for adults; 18 strokes for juveniles	24 strokes for adults; 10 strokes for juveniles	
Terminology	The official term is whipping in accordance with traditional British legislative terminology.	The official term is whipping in accordance with traditional British legislative terminology. Informally, the term caning, as well as strokes of the cane and strokes of the rotan, is used.	In both legislation and press reports, the term used is caning.
Dimensions of the cane	About 1.2 m (3.9 ft) long and no more than 1.27 cm (0.5 in) in diameter	About 1.09 m (3.6 ft) long and no more than 1.25 cm (0.49 in) in diameter	About 1.2 m (3.9 ft) long and no more than 1.27 cm (0.5 in) in diameter
Type of cane	The same type of rattan cane is used on all offenders regardless of the offence committed.	Two types of rattan canes are used: The smaller one is for white-collar offenders while the larger one is for other offenders.	The same type of rattan cane is used on all offenders regardless of the offence committed.
Modus operandi	The offender is tied to a wooden frame in a bent-over position with his feet together. He has protective padding secured around his lower back to protect the kidney and lower spine area from strokes that land off-target.	The offender stands upright at an A-shaped wooden frame with his feet apart and hands tied above his head. He has a special protective "shield" tied around his lower body to cover the lower back and upper thighs while leaving the buttocks exposed.	The offender is tied to the trestle in a bent-over position with his feet together. He has protective padding secured around his lower back to protect the kidney and lower spine area from strokes that land off-target.

== Prison caning ==
Under Malaysian law, the officer in charge of a prison (holding the rank of Assistant Commissioner of Prison and above) may impose caning on prisoners who commit aggravated prison offences even if they were not sentenced to caning earlier in a court of law. The prisoner is given an opportunity to hear the charge and evidence against him and make his defence.

== Sharia caning ==
Malaysia has a parallel justice system of sharia courts, in which state sharia criminal law may create offences punishable by not more than 6 strokes of the cane.

This kind of caning is rarely implemented, and is quite different from, and much less severe than judicial caning under Malaysian criminal law. It is intended to be humiliating rather than particularly painful. Before the caning is carried out, a medical officer must certify that the offender is fit to undergo the punishment. A rattan cane about 1.25 cm (0.49 in) in diameter is used. The punishment is normally carried out in an enclosed area out of the view of the public, even though the Syariah Criminal Procedure (Sabah) Enactment 1993 allows the court to determine where the caning is to take place. The offender remains fully dressed; men remain standing when they receive the punishment while women are seated. Although the law states that the offender can be caned on all parts of the body except the face, head, stomach, chest or private parts, in practice the caning is usually administered on the offender's back. It is carried out by an officer of the same sex as the offender. Each stroke intended to be executed with force low enough to not break the skin, and the officer delivers the punishment with a "limp wrist" and without raising his/her hand. A medical officer is also present throughout the procedure to ensure safety.

This form of caning is also practised in Indonesia's Aceh Province, where it is more common.

=== Notable cases ===
- There was controversy surrounding the caning sentence for Kartika Sari Dewi Shukarno, a Malaysian hospital worker working in Singapore. She was sentenced in 2009 by a sharia court to six strokes of the cane and a fine for drinking a can of beer in a hotel bar. Some said that Kartika's sentence did not conform to Islamic law, but Mohamad Sahfri, the chairman of the Pahang Religious Affairs Committee, said that all relevant regulations had been observed. On 1 April 2010, one day before the sentence was due to be carried out, the Sultan of Pahang commuted the sentence to three weeks of community service. Kartika said she preferred to have the original sentence imposed.
- On 9 February 2010, three Muslim women were caned by order of a sharia court for adultery. The advocacy group Sisters in Islam and the Malaysian Bar Council said that these canings violated federal civil laws prohibiting the punishment against women.
- In 2016, a couple were caned in Sabah for offenses likely related to close proximity (Khalwat) or sexual relationships outside of a legal marriage. The caning was carried out in the Tawau Shariah Court.
- On 3 September 2018, two Malaysian women were each sentenced to six strokes of the cane and fines for having lesbian sex. The punishment was carried out at the Sharia High Court in Kuala Terengganu. The case sparked widespread controversy and drew strong criticism from various rights groups in Malaysia.
- In February 2024, a 42-year-old construction worker received four lashes and a fine of RM 3,000 in Terengganu after being convicted of committing khalwat (close proximity) under Section 31 (a) of the Shariah Criminal Offences Enactment 2022.
- In 2024, Nurfifi Amira Nawi became the first woman in Terengganu to be sentenced to caning for 'khalwat' (close proximity). She received six strokes of the cane and a RM4,000 fine after pleading guilty to being in a house with a man who was not her husband or mahram. The caning was carried out on 6 May 2024 at Marang Prison.
- In 27 December 2024, Malaysian man Mohd Effendi Awang a 42 year old father of five was publicly caned in the Al-Muktafi Billah Shah Mosque hall in Kuala Terengganu, Terengganu after being repeatedly convicted of the Islamic crime of ‘Khalwat’, or close proximity. This was the first caning in Terengganu to take place outdoors, which the Malaysian Bar asserted was not provided for by the Syariah Criminal Offences (Takzir) (Terengganu) Enactment Amendment 2022 under which the sentencing took place.

== School caning ==
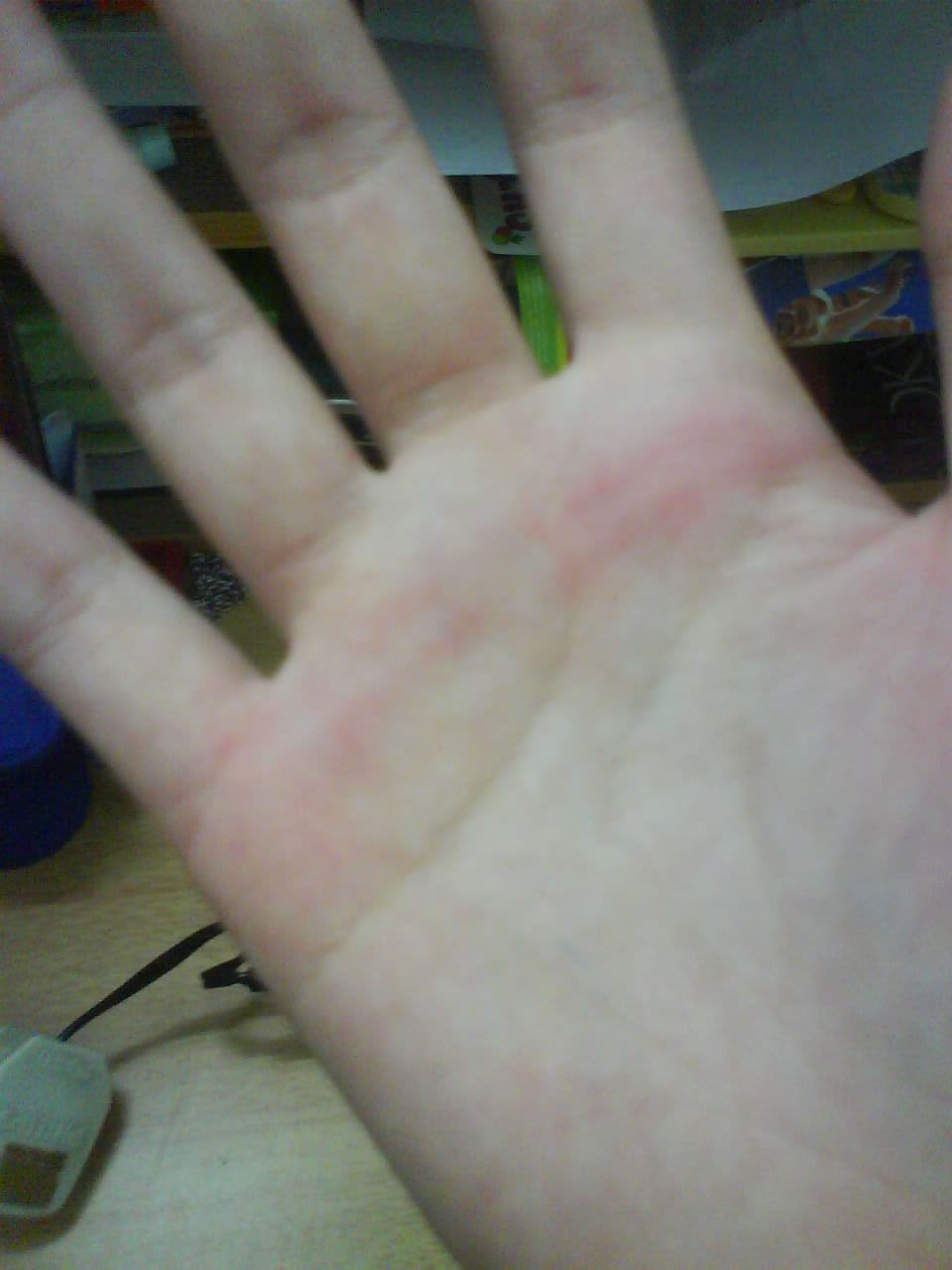
The marks left on a female student's palm after a stroke of the cane

In Malaysian primary and secondary schools, caning is a legal disciplinary measure. Although permitted for boys only, in practice it is sometimes also used on girls.

A survey conducted by YouGov in 2019 found that 81 percent of parents in Malaysia supported the use of corporal punishment. 47 percent supported its use in schools. The survey also found that 85 percent of the parents had been physically disciplined growing up.

=== Government guidelines on school caning ===
- Caning is permitted for boys only.
- In most circumstances, caning can only be conducted by the Headmaster. A teacher can only use the cane when the Headmaster delegates this power to him/her in writing. He/she must also be a permanent staff member of the school.
- The student can only be caned on the buttocks over clothing or on the palm of the hand.
- The caning is to be conducted in a confined area.
- The student's parents will be informed and invited to witness their child's punishment.
- Caning must only be meted out for a repeated or serious offence.

The Education Ministry discourages the caning of primary school students. However, based on numerous reported cases, caning is still common in both primary and secondary schools.

Public caning has been discouraged in schools after the Education Regulations came into force. However, there are many cases suggesting that the caning of both boys and girls in front of the class/school is common.

There are many reported cases suggesting that the caning of girls on the clothed bottom, arms, legs, or palm of the hand is a common practice. Anecdotal evidence suggests that, especially in Chinese-medium schools, every girl would undoubtedly be caned at least once.

While serious infringements such as theft, smoking, gangsterism and bullying are among offences punishable by caning, minor transgressions are also frequently dealt with by physical punishment.

=== Chinese-language medium schools ===
Caning is especially prevalent Malaysia's Chinese-language medium schools, where it is a daily occurrence for girls and boys of all ages instead of being a "special punishment" reserved for serious offences. Typically, a student is caned on the spot in front of his or her class/school for transgressions such as:

- late-coming
- skipping class
- improperly attired, having long hair (boys), nails not trimmed
- defiance / disobedience, not paying attention in class
- being unable to answer questions correctly
- not bringing textbooks/homework to school
- incomplete/poorly done homework
- poor results

This will typically be administered on the palm of the hand or clothed bottom, albeit less serious or forceful than an "official" caning for serious disciplinary breaches. Anecdotally, these will cause the palm/buttocks to sting, especially after multiple consecutive strokes. Mass punishments are not uncommon.

=== Notable cases ===
- 2000: A 10-year-old student from a Klang school was given 35 strokes of the cane on both hands by her teacher for late homework.
- 2009: A class of 43 nine-year-old boys and girls in a Kuala Lumpur primary school were each made to turn around and given multiple strokes of the cane by their substitute teacher for making excessive noise, leaving welts on their backs and breaking the canes.
- 2010: Two 16-year-old girls from Pahang were given one to two strokes of the cane by the vice-principal on their palms and arms for leaving their classroom without a "hall pass".
- 2011: 2 girls and 11 boys of various ages from a Muar secondary school were caned on their bottoms for reasons including rudeness to teacher, participating in a quarrel, and handing in blank exam papers.
- 2013: A class of 41 ten-year-old students from a Kuching school were caned by the principal on their palms for making excessive noise.
- 2015: Forty 13-year-old girls from a Selangor religious school were each caned twice behind their body and once on the palm of their hands after none of them admitted to stealing RM100 from a fellow student.
- 2015: A student from a Sarawak secondary school was caned on her palm after being absent while unwell without a sick note.
- 2015: 12-year-old students from a class in a Negeri Sembilan primary school were each caned more than 10 times, a stroke of the cane for getting each practice question wrong or not bringing textbooks, during a holiday class. A particular student that had been given 20 strokes insulted her teacher on social media afterwards. This resulted in the vice-principal giving her additional strokes of the cane in front of her class as well as detention.
- 2015: A 9-year-old student from a Senai school was caned twice on her palm and thrice on her bottom in front of her class, using a bundle of 3 canes, for not seeking permission before drinking water. She had already been given more than 10 strokes of the cane on another occasion for not answering a question that her teacher asked.
- 2016: A 7-year-old student from Johor Bahru was caned by her teacher for not getting full marks on a test and not doing homework, leaving 7 welts on her arms and legs. Parents questioned the teacher as it was not the first time caning her.
- 2016: An 11-year-old student was caned all over her body in front of her class and given detention by her teacher for not completing homework, leaving multiple welts on her thighs, arms and body.
- 2016: A religious teacher caned three boys who tried to run away from their school's hostel.
- 2017: 8 and 9 year old students from a Selangor school were given up to 12 strokes of the cane for not submitting school fees.
- 2017: A 9-year-old student from Johor Bahru was caned on her palms and more than six strokes on her arms afterwards for repeated truancy, disobedience, not submitting her homework and not bringing textbooks.
- 2018: An 8-year-old student was given nine strokes of the cane on her palms for spilling water on exercise books.
- 2019: A 13-year-old student from a Johor Bahru secondary school was caned in front of her class for calling her teacher derogatory names, leaving more than six red welts on her arms and legs.
- 2019: An 11-year-old student and more than half of her class from a Puchong school were each given one stroke of the cane on their palms and given lines for not doing or bringing their homework.

== Domestic caning ==
Corporal punishment of children with a rattan cane by their parents is lawful and culturally accepted in Malaysia. This is done for various reasons, including misbehaviour, laziness or poor results. Sometimes, parents may cane their children after learning that they had been caned in school. However, if the caning causes physical and mental injuries, it becomes an offence under the law.

== Criticism ==
Malaysia has been criticised by human rights groups for its use of judicial caning. A 2010 report by Amnesty International criticises the increasing use of judicial caning in Malaysia and claims the punishment "subjects thousands of people each year to systematic torture and ill-treatment, leaving them with permanent physical and psychological scars". Amnesty International estimates that some 10,000 people are caned each year, many of them for immigration offences. The charity argues the practice could cause long-term disabilities and trauma and said many of the foreigners sentenced to caning did not get legal representation or understand the charge.

Malaysian officials reject the accusation of torture. The Prison Department states that canings are carefully supervised by prison authorities and attended by medical doctors.

== See also ==
- Caning
- Caning in Singapore
- Caning in Brunei
- Judicial corporal punishment
- Human rights in Malaysia
