= Caning in Indonesia =

Corporal punishment

Caning refers to the use of corporal punishment involving strokes with a rattan, whip or similar equipment. Historically, caning was used as a judicial and disciplinary punishment during the Dutch East Indies period. In contemporary Indonesia, caning is not used as legal punishment under national criminal law, but remains a legal punishment under Islamic criminal law in the autonomous province of Aceh. Outside Aceh, caning survives only in informal or domestic contexts and is not recognized as a lawful criminal sanction.

== History ==
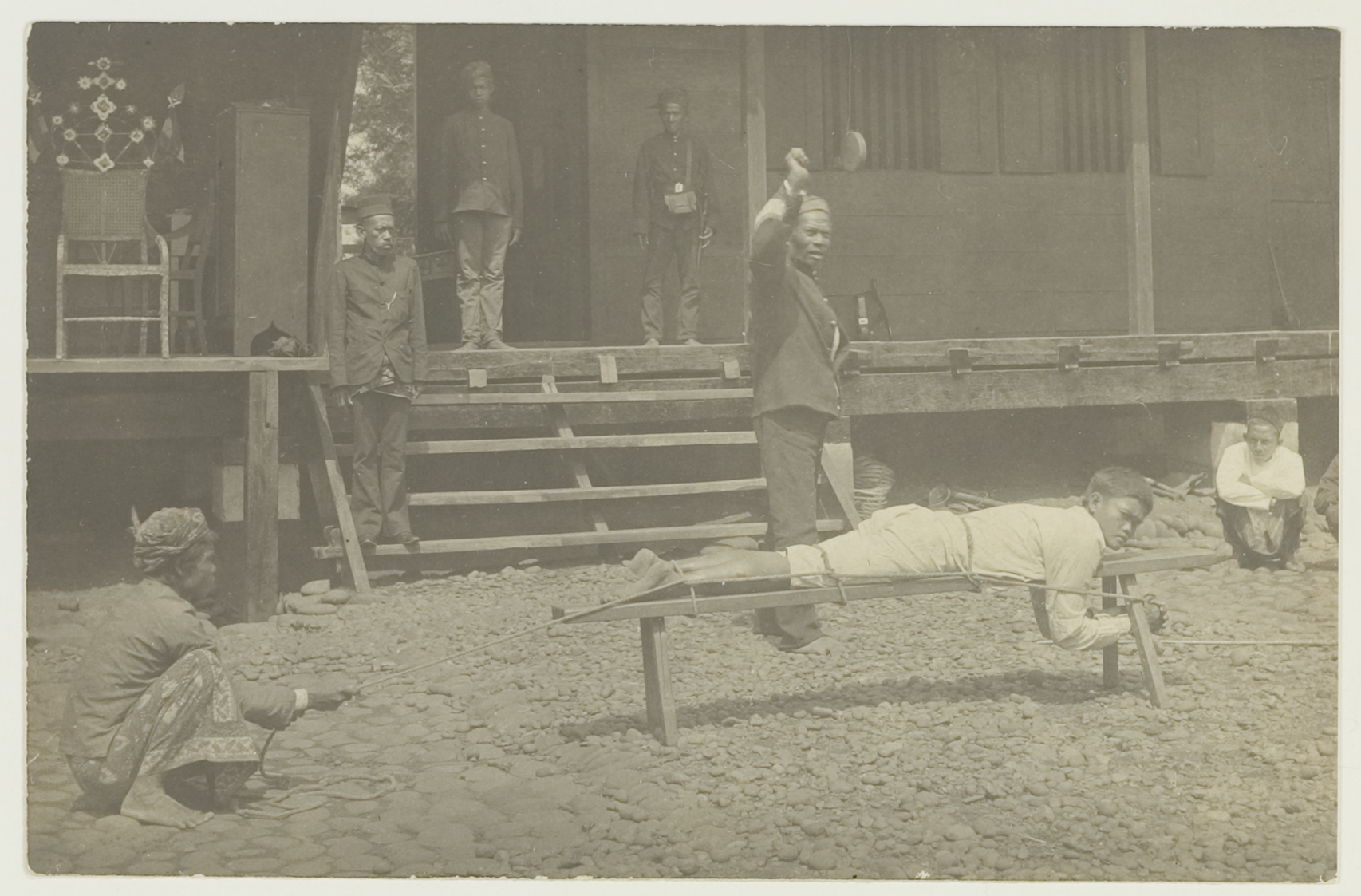
Caning punishment in Lahat, South Sumatra

Corporal punishment using a rattan or bamboo stick was widely practiced during the colonial period in the Dutch East Indies. Known as rotanstraf, caning was employed by the Dutch East India Company (VOC) and later the Dutch colonial state as a means of discipline and punishment. It functioned both as a criminal penalty and as an administrative tool to enforce labour disciplinel.

The formal judicial use of caning was abolished in 1866. Colonial records and later scholarship note that the abolition of rotanstraf coincided with changes in colonial labour regimes, including a decline in corvée labour and a growing reliance on short-term convict labour. As caning disappeared as a formal punishment, other forms of administrative sanctions gained prominence within the colonial penal system. Despite its abolition as a legal sanction, corporal punishment continued to shape disciplinary practices in colonial institutions well into the late nineteenth century.

== Judicial caning ==
=== National criminal law ===
Under Indonesian Penal Code, caning is not a recognized criminal punishment. Acts of physical violence committed as punishment may instead constitute criminal offenses under general assault provisions or domestic violence.

=== Sharia caning in Aceh ===
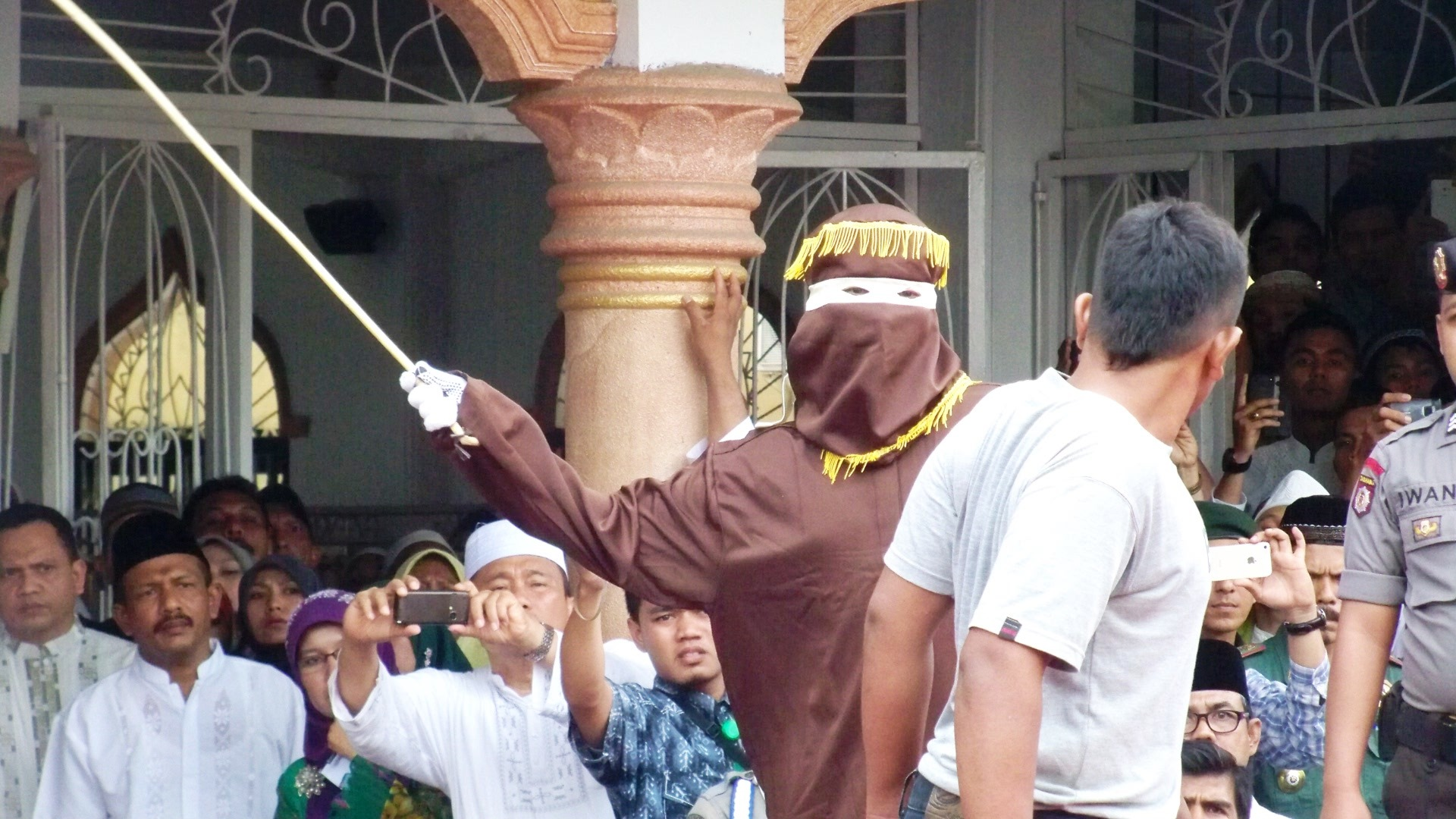
A man being caned in Aceh, September 2014

Caning is legally practiced in Aceh under provincial qanun regulations enacted pursuant to Aceh's special autonomy status. Islamic criminal law in Aceh allows courts to sentence offenders to caning for specific moral and religious offenses.

Offenses punishable by caning in Aceh include adultery, gambling, alcohol consumption, khilwa (close proximity between unmarried persons), and same-sex sexual relations. Caning sentences are imposed by sharia courts and are carried out publicly, usually outside mosques or other designated venues. The punishment is intended to serve as both a deterrent and a form of public shaming.

Although caning in Aceh is regulated by local law, it has been widely criticized by human rights organizations for violating international human rights standards.

== School caning ==
Corporal punishment, including caning students, was long practiced in Indonesian schools and continued into the post-independence period. Studies describe physical punishment such as hitting and other physical punishment as common disciplinary practices used by teachers for decades. However, since the adoption of the Child-Friendly School (Sekolah Ramah Anak) framework in 2014, national policy has emphasized the prevention of violence in schools and the creation of a safe learning environment. As a result, caning is not treated as a permitted disciplinary measure in Indonesia's education policy. Physical punishment by teachers is therefore regarded as violence or misconduct, not as an approved form of discipline.

Despite this prohibition, studies and reports show that physical punishment, including caning with rattan, was long practiced in Indonesian schools, and that some of these practices have continued informally even after policy changes. This indicates a gap between official rules and day-to-day practice in some schools.

Regulations on education and child protection provide that teachers who use physical force may face administrative sanctions or criminal complaints, particularly under child-protection rules. Court practice and government regulations have stressed that disciplinary measures must be educational in nature and must not involve violence, and that physical punishment is not recognized as a lawful school sanction.

== See also ==
- Caning in Malaysia
- Islamic criminal law in Aceh
- Law of Indonesia
- Regional regulation (Indonesia)
- Homosexuality in Indonesia
