= Judicial corporal punishment =

Punitive practice

Judicial corporal punishment is the infliction of corporal punishment as a result of a sentence imposed on an offender by a court of law, including flagellation (also called flogging or whipping), forced amputations, caning, bastinado, birching, or strapping. Legal corporal punishment is forbidden in most countries, but it still is a form of legal punishment practised according to the legislations of Brunei, Iran, Libya, the Maldives, Malaysia, Saudi Arabia, Singapore, the United Arab Emirates, Yemen, and Qatar, as well as parts of Indonesia (Aceh province) and Nigeria (northern states).

== Countries where judicial corporal punishment is used ==
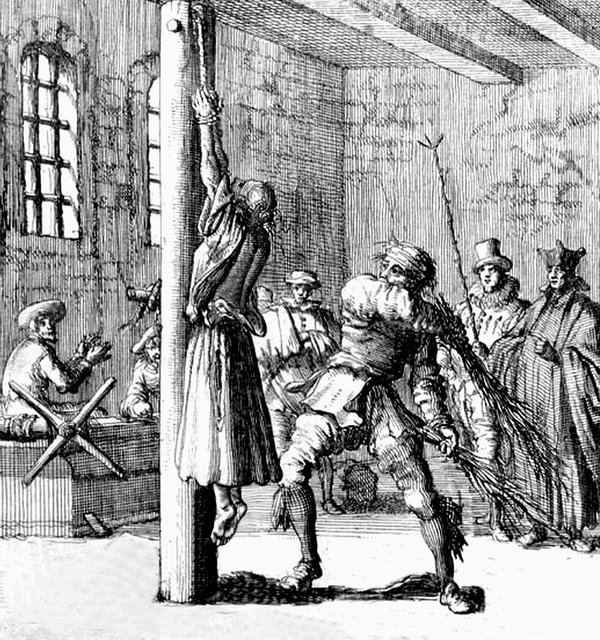
Birching of Anabaptist martyr Ursula, Maastricht, 1570; engraving by Jan Luyken from Martyrs Mirror

Singapore's use of caning as a form of judicial corporal punishment became much discussed around the world in 1994 when a United States citizen, Michael Fay, was caned for vandalism. Two of Singapore's neighbouring countries, Malaysia and Brunei, also use judicial caning.

Other former British colonies which currently have judicial caning on their statute books include Barbados, Botswana, Brunei, Swaziland, Tonga, Trinidad and Tobago, and Zimbabwe.

Many Muslim-majority territories, including Saudi Arabia, Qatar, Iran, northern Nigeria, Yemen, and Indonesia's Aceh Province, employ judicial whipping, caning and amputations for a range of offences.

=== Full list of countries ===
Laws on corporal punishment for minors Illegal altogether Legal in homes Legal in homes and private schools Legal in homes and schools (public and private) Legal in homes, schools, and judicially

Countries with judicial corporal punishment

A list of countries that use lawful, official judicial corporal punishment today is as follows:

1. Afghanistan. See Judicial corporal punishment in Afghanistan
2. Antigua and Barbuda (flogging)
3. Bahamas (men – cat on bare back; boys – cane on bare buttocks; in private)
4. Botswana (males aged 14 to 40 – cane on bare buttocks; in private)
5. Brunei (men and boys – cane on bare buttocks; in private) See Caning in Brunei.
6. Dominica (boys under 16 – details unclear)
7. Indonesia, Aceh Special Region only (men and women – cane on clothed back; Muslims only: details unclear)
8. Iran (men, women, boys, girls – whip or strap, no target specified; public or private); "eye for an eye" punishments are also legal.
9. Lesotho (men and boys – details unclear)
10. Malaysia (Criminal law: men – cane on bare buttocks; in private, male juveniles - cane on clothed buttocks with a light cane; in courtroom). See Caning in Malaysia. *(Sharia law, Muslims only: men and women – cane on clothed back; in private)
11. Maldives (men and women – details unclear)
12. Mauritania (flogging)
13. Nigeria (men, women – cane on clothed buttocks or whip on bare back; in public or private.)
14. Pakistan (men and boys – cane or strap on clothed buttocks; public or private)
15. Qatar (men and women – details unclear; in private)
16. Saudi Arabia: Saudi Arabia has corporal punishment, including forced amputations and flogging, including for child offenders.
17. Saint Kitts and Nevis (boys and men – details unclear)
18. Sierra Leone (boys only – cane or birch on bare buttocks)
19. Singapore (men and boys – cane on bare buttocks; in private). See Caning in Singapore.
20. Somalia (men and women – cane on clothed buttocks)
21. Eswatini (boys only – cane on bare buttocks)
22. Tanzania (men and boys – cane on bare buttocks; in private)
23. Tonga (men – cat on bare buttocks; boys – birch or cat on bare buttocks)
24. Trinidad and Tobago (men only – cat on bare back or birch on bare buttocks; in private)
25. Tuvalu (details unclear)
26. Yemen (details unclear)

The above list does not include countries where a "blind eye" is sometimes turned to unofficial JCP by local tribes, authorities, etc. including Bangladesh, Ecuador (men and women – traditional indigenous justice) and Colombia.

== History by country ==
=== Egypt ===
The Ancient Egyptians practised rhinectomy, punishing some offenders by cutting off their noses. Such criminals were often exiled to locations in Sinai, such as Tjaru and Rhinocorura.

=== Netherlands ===
In 1854, all forms of JCP were abolished in the Netherlands with the exception of whipping, which was abolished in 1870. In the Wetboek van Strafrecht, article 9, this kind of punishment is not listed in both primary and secondary levels.

=== South Africa ===
The Constitutional Court decided in 1995 in the case of S v Williams and Others that caning of juveniles was unconstitutional. Although the ruling in S v Williams was limited to the corporal punishment of males under the age of 21, Justice Langa mentioned in dicta that there was a consensus that corporal punishment of adults was also unconstitutional.

The Abolition of Corporal Punishment Act, 1997 abolished judicial corporal punishment.

=== United Kingdom ===
In the United Kingdom, judicial corporal punishment generally was abolished in 1948; however, it persisted in prisons as a punishment for prisoners committing serious assaults on prison staff (ordered by visiting justices) until it was abolished by section 65 of the Criminal Justice Act 1967. The last ever prison flogging happened in 1962.

=== Jersey, Guernsey and Isle of Man ===
The last birching sentence in Jersey was carried out in 1966. Birching was abandoned as a policy in 1969 but lingered on the statute books. Obsolete references to corporal punishment were removed from remaining statutes by the Criminal Justice (Miscellaneous Provisions) (No. 2) (Jersey) Law 2007.

The last birching sentence in Guernsey was carried out in 1968. The Corporal Punishment (Guernsey) Law, 1957 was finally repealed by the Criminal Justice (Miscellaneous Provisions) (Bailiwick of Guernsey) Law, 2006.

Judicial birching was abolished in the Isle of Man in 1993 following the 1978 judgment in Tyrer v. UK by the European Court of Human Rights. The last birching had taken place in January 1976; the last caning, of a 13-year-old boy convicted of robbing another child of 10p, was the last recorded juvenile case in May 1971.

=== United Arab Emirates ===
Legal punishments in the United Arab Emirates includes forced amputations and flogging; "eye for an eye" punishments are also part of Emirati national legislation.

=== United States ===
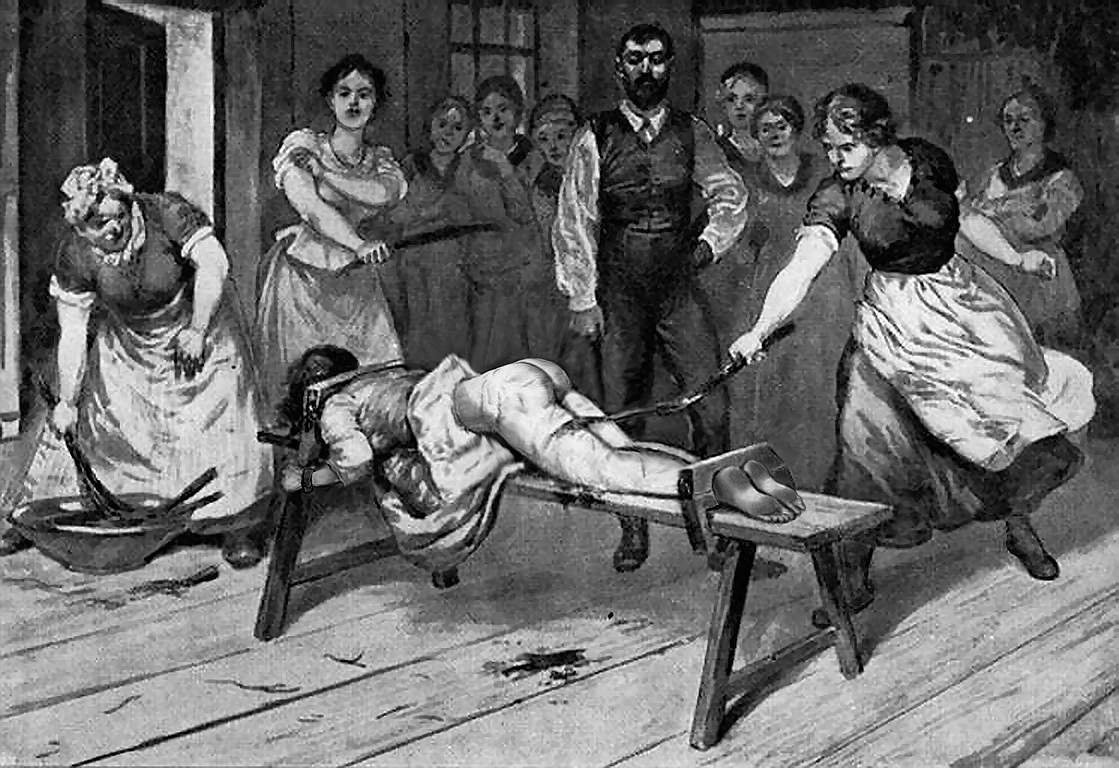
Judicial corporal punishment in a women's prison, USA (ca. 1890)

American colonies judicially punished in a variety of forms, including whipping, stocks, the pillory and the ducking stool. In the 17th and 18th centuries, whipping posts were considered indispensable in American and English towns. Starting in 1776, George Washington strongly advocated and utilised judicial corporal punishment in the Continental Army, with due process protection, obtaining in 1776 authority from the Continental Congress to impose 100 lashes, more than the previous limit of 39. In his 1778 Bill for Proportioning Crimes and Punishments, Thomas Jefferson provided up to 15 lashes for individuals pretending to witchcraft or prophecy, at the jury's discretion; castration for men guilty of rape, polygamy or sodomy, and a minimum half-inch (13 mm) hole bored in the nose cartilage of women convicted of those sex crimes. In 1781, Washington requested legal authority from the Continental Congress to impose up to 500 lashes, as there was still a punishment gap between 100 lashes and the death penalty. The Founders believed whipping and other forms of corporal punishment effectively promoted pro-social and discouraged anti-social behavior. Two later presidents, Abraham Lincoln and Theodore Roosevelt, advocated judicial corporal punishment as punishment for wife-beating.

In the United States, judicial flogging was last used in 1952 in Delaware when John P. Barbieri, a 30-year-old man who was convicted of beating a 59-year-old woman whom he mistook for someone else and had a prior conviction for beating his wife, received 20 lashes. In Delaware, the criminal code permitted floggings until 1972. One of the major objections to judicial corporal punishment in the United States was that it was unpleasant to administer.

=== Other countries ===
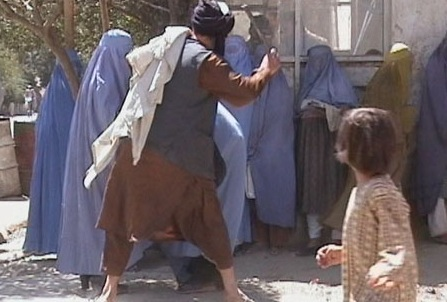
Public flogging of a woman by the Taliban in Afghanistan, early 2000s

Judicial corporal punishment was removed from the statute book in Canada in 1972, in India in 1955, in New Zealand in 1941, and in Australia at various times in the 20th century according to state. William John O'Meally was the last person flogged in Australia in Melbourne's Pentridge Prison in 1958.

It has been abolished in recent decades in Hong Kong, Jamaica, Kenya, Sri Lanka, and Zambia.

Other countries that were neither former British territories nor Islamic states that have used JCP in the more distant past include China, Germany, South Korea, Sweden and Vietnam.

== See also ==
- Peter Moskos, American criminologist who has advocated judicial flogging
- Police brutality
