= Switch (corporal punishment) =

Flexible rod used for corporal punishment

A switch is a thin, flexible twig from a tree or shrub used as an implement in corporal punishment. The application of a switch is called switching.

== Material ==
Switches are typically made of strong and flexible wood such as hazel, birch, or hickory. Willow branches are also used, as well as branches from strong trees and large shrubs. Switches are often from a garden or an orchard nearby, or taken from the wild. In the Southeastern United States, fresh-cut, flexible cane (Arundinaria) is commonly used.

== Corporal punishment ==
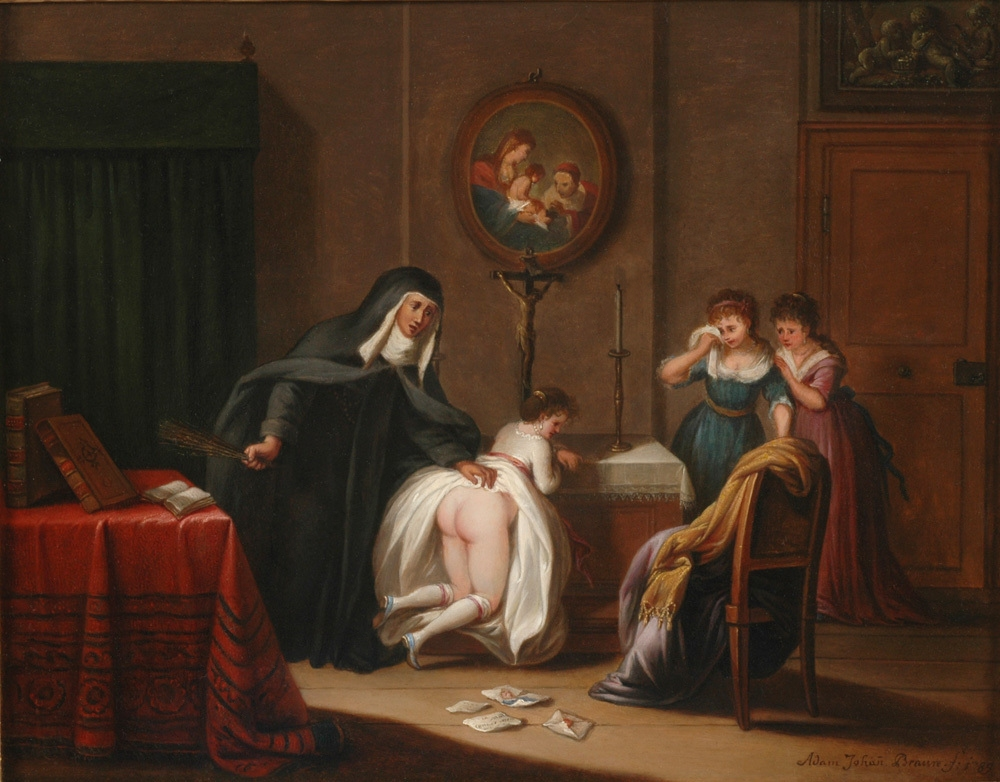
Switch in Adam Johann Braun's Maedchenschule, 1789

Both historically and in the contemporary era, switching is a form of punishment used by parents.

Historically, it was used as punishment against slaves in the United States and was one method of corporal punishment in some armies.

The tamarind switch (in Creole English tambran switch) is a judicial birch-like instrument for corporal punishment made from three tamarind rods, braided and oiled, used long after independence in the Commonwealth Caribbean island states of Jamaica and Trinidad and Tobago. The Jamaican legal case Osbourne v Jamaica contested, on the grounds of human rights, the legality of the tamarind switch being used as a form of judicial corporal punishment. Within Jamaica, the last person to receive the tamarind switch was Errol Pryce in 1997 (sentenced to prison in 1994 for the crime of stabbing his mother-in-law) upon release from prison. The use of the tamarind switch was effectively ended as a possibility for judicial punishment within Jamaica in 2004, though was only formally removed from statute law in 2013. The abolishment of the tamarind switch was met with praise from international human rights groups and opposition by some of Jamaica's population.

== See also ==
- Caning
- Birching
- Corporal punishment in the home
- Judicial corporal punishment
- School corporal punishment
- Switchgrass
- Switchcane
