= Abolition of Corporal Punishment Act, 1997 =

South African law banning corporal punishment

Parliament of South Africa
- Long title: Act to provide for the abolishment of corporal punishment authorised in legislation; and to provide for matters connected therewith.
- Citation: Act No. 33 of 1997
- Enacted by: Parliament of South Africa
- Assented to: 28 August 1997
- Commenced: 5 September 1997
- Status: Spent

The Abolition of Corporal Punishment Act, 1997 (Act No. 33 of 1997) is an act of the Parliament of South Africa that abolished judicial corporal punishment. It followed the Constitutional Court's 1995 decision in the case of S v Williams and Others that caning of juveniles was unconstitutional. Although the ruling in S v Williams was limited to the corporal punishment of males under the age of 21, Justice Langa mentioned in dicta that there was a consensus that corporal punishment of adults was also unconstitutional.

The act contains two substantive sections. The first provides that "any law which authorises corporal punishment by a court of law, including a court of traditional leaders," is repealed to the extent that it authorises such a punishment. The second makes specific textual amendments various statutes, including the Black Administration Act, the Magistrates' Courts Act and the Criminal Procedure Act, to remove references to corporal punishment.
