= S v Williams (1995) =

South African legal case concerning juvenile corporal punishment

- Court: Constitutional Court of South Africa
- Full case name: State v Williams and Others
- Decided: 9 June 1995
- Citations: [1995] ZACC 6, 1995 (3) SA 632 (CC), 1995 (7) BCLR 861 (CC)

Case history
- Prior action: Referral from Cape Provincial Division

Court membership
- Judges sitting: Chaskalson P, Ackermann, Didcott, Kriegler, Langa, Madala, Mahomed, Mokgoro, O'Regan & Sachs JJ, Kentridge AJ

Case opinions
- Decision by: Langa

S v Williams and Others is a decision of the Constitutional Court of South Africa in which the court ruled that judicial corporal punishment of juveniles is unconstitutional. The decision was taken with respect to five different cases in which six juveniles were convicted by different magistrates and sentenced to receive a "moderate correction" of a number of strokes with a light cane.

The unanimous judgment, handed down on 9 June 1995, found the imposition of corporal punishment to be incompatible with the Interim Constitution of South Africa because it violates the right to human dignity and the protection against cruel, inhuman or degrading punishment.

The case did not deal with judicial corporal punishment of adults, but in argument before the court all parties agreed that it was unconstitutional. In 1997 Parliament passed the Abolition of Corporal Punishment Act, which repealed all laws allowing for judicial corporal punishment.
