= Tawse =

Tool used for corporal punishment

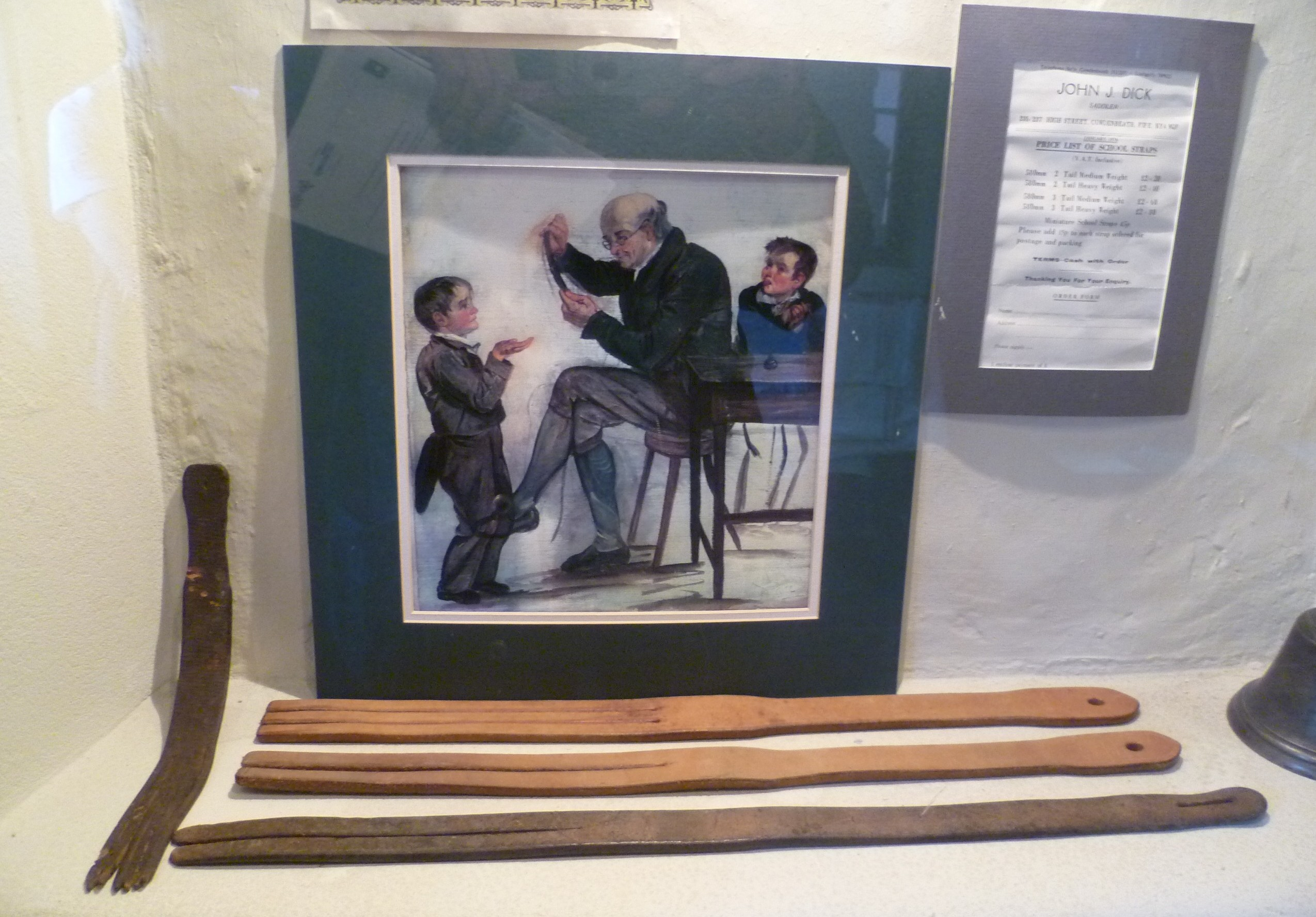
Examples of the tawse, made in Lochgelly. An exhibit in the Abbot House, Dunfermline. The painting is 'The Dominie Functions' (1826) by George Harvey (1806-1876)

The tawse, sometimes formerly spelled taws (the plural of Scots taw, a thong of a whip), is an implement for corporal punishment applied either to the buttocks (see spanking) or the palm of the hand (known as hand tawsing). The tawse is a leather strap that has one end split into two or more strips. A spanking administered with a tawse is technically known as tawsing, although the terms strapping and belting may be used to describe it.

The general sensation from a tawsing is a stinging that gives way to more notable burning and throbbing pain, however the exact experience will be influenced by factors such as: the number of strokes administered, the speed at which the strokes are administered, the force behind the strokes, the thickness of the tawse itself (with a thicker tawse typically resulting in greater intensity), and the individual's pain tolerance.

The tawse is associated with Scotland, particularly in educational discipline, but it was also used in schools in a few English cities, e.g., Newcastle upon Tyne, Gateshead, Liverpool, Manchester and Walsall. In this British educational context, the official name "tawse" was hardly ever used in conversation by either teachers or pupils, who instead referred to it as either the school strap or the belt.

Tawsing can be done as a consensual activity between adults as part of erotic spanking, a form of impact play.

== Schools ==
Scottish state (public) schools used the tawse to punish pupils of either sex on the palm of the outstretched hand. Pupils were usually instructed to hold out one hand, palm uppermost, supported by the other hand below, which made it difficult to move the hand away during the infliction of the strokes. It also ensured that the full force of each stroke was taken by the hand being strapped. The punishment was usually inflicted by the class teacher in front of the entire class, to act as a deterrent to others; sometimes by a designated teacher, such as the Deputy Headmaster, to whom the pupil was sent.

This was wielded in primary as well as secondary schools for both trivial and serious offences, and girls got belted as well as boys. Nearly 6 in 10 girls were strapped in school.

In Walsall and Gateshead, and in some schools in Manchester and Nottingham, students (mainly male) were tawsed on the seat of the trousers.

Some Scottish private (independent) schools also used the tawse, such as Keil School. St Aloysius' College, Glasgow used the ferula, a thin strip of metal covered in rubber, but others such as Fettes College used the cane instead, as did most schools in England outside the north-east.

In 1982, two Scottish mothers went to the European Court of Human Rights, who passed a judgment that parents had the right to refuse corporal punishment of a child. This judgement led indirectly to the use of the tawse (and all other forms of corporal punishment) being banned by law in UK state schools. The legislation came into force in 1987, but most Scottish local education authorities had already abolished it by the early 1980s.

John J. Dick Leather Goods was a manufacturer in Lochgelly estimated to have made around 70% of tawses when they were used in schools. Original tawses sold for around £6 in 1982 but twenty years later, some collectors were paying hundreds of pounds each for rare items.

== Judicial ==
The tawse was also used for judicial corporal punishment in Scotland as an alternative to the more usual birch. Courts could sentence boys of over 14 but under 16 to up to 36 strokes with an extra-heavy tawse for any offence. This was administered to the offender's bare buttocks. Judicial corporal punishment was abolished in 1948.

== See also ==
- Corporal punishment
- School discipline

== Sources and external links ==
- The Cane and the Tawse in Scottish Schools, article at World Corporal Punishment Research
- "The Belt (Factsheet 12)" (PDF). Heatherbank Museum of Social Work. Glasgow: Glasgow Caledonian University. Archived from the original (PDF) on 1 June 2010.
- The True History of the Lochgelly Tawse
