= Belting =

Belting may refer to:

- Belting (beating), the act of using a belt as an instrument of physical punishment
- Belting (music), a technique for singing loud high notes with the chest register
- Belt (mechanical), belts looped over pulleys

== People with the surname ==
- George B. Belting, American politician
- Hans Belting (1935-2023), German art historian
