= William John O'Meally =

Australian criminal

William John O'Meally (born Joseph Thompson; 25 November 1920 in Young, New South Wales – 1995 in rural Queensland) was an Australian criminal, notorious as the last man to be flogged in Victoria in 1958.

== Early life ==
O'Meally was born Joseph Thompson and was the second of four children. When he was aged 11 the family moved to Sydney. The marriage of his parents soon dissolved and he became a ward of the state. He left that care when aged 14. O'Meally claimed to be the grandson of Johnie O'Meally a member of Ben Hall's gang. It is unclear when he changed his name.

On his own he was soon in trouble. He was sentenced to two days hard labour for riding on a train without a ticket. In June 1936 he was convicted of assaulting a policeman. As a result, he was classified as "uncontrollable" and sent to Gosford Reformatory. He escaped but was lost for a week in the mangroves on the Hawkesbury River.

As a juvenile he received a number of convictions for assault, housebreaking and riotous behaviour. Before 1952 he had 42 convictions including five for assaulting police.

== Murder of Howell ==
On the night of 30 January 1952 Constable George Howell was working at the Malvern East Police Station. He was unarmed when he left the station on a bicycle to patrol the area around the Crystal Palace Theatre, Caulfield where there had been a number of thefts from cars. Howell was 21 years old and due to be married on 26 February.

When Howell arrived at the cinema he saw a man loitering near the parked cars. When the young constable approached him, the man dropped his torch and a set of car keys and ran. Constable Howell grabbed the man but the man shook him off and continued to flee. Howell chased the man and caught up with him. The man turned and shot George Howell once, in the stomach, at point-blank range. Howell died on 1 February 1952.

O'Meally was charged with the murder. He had been released from prison in May 1951 after serving six months for the assault of another policeman. O'Meally maintained his innocence of the murder, saying that the police had conspired to frame him. He said he knew who the murderers were but would not name them. O'Meally and his wife said that they were home together in Bonbeach at the time of the murder. Coincidentally, Constable Howell had also lived in Bonbeach. O'Meally said that, because he and Howell were known to each other, Howell would have identified him before he died.

After 10 days of evidence from 41 witnesses the jury took four hours to find O'Meally guilty. He cried as the verdict was delivered, and again denied his guilt.

O'Meally was sentenced to hang for the murder of the policeman. This was commuted by the new State Labor government to "imprisonment for the full term of his life without any remissions whatsoever and without the benefit of the regulations relating to the remission of sentences", that is, life without parole.

In 1955 O'Meally escaped from H Division of Pentridge Prison. He was re-captured the same day, in Coburg, not far from the prison.

== Escape of 1957 ==
In March 1957 O'Meally again escaped from Pentridge. With an accomplice, John Henry Taylor, who was armed with a .38 automatic handgun, he ran through the main gates of the gaol. Chief Penal officer Robert Davis tried to stop them and was shot in the thigh, breaking his femur. The pair ran to a nearby filling station, stole a ute belonging to future racing champion Norm Beechey, before O'Meally then took the firearm and engaged in a gun battle with warders. They were re-captured within 13 minutes after the bonnet of the getaway car flicked up and broke the windscreen, causing the car to crash into a hydrant.

On 31 October 1957 Mr Justice Hudson told O'Meally and Taylor; "You are both clearly beyond hope of reform. Simply to sentence you to a further term of imprisonment would be to impose a totally inadequate form of punishment, and would provide no real deterrent against further attacks of a like character."

They were sentenced to 10 more years in gaol. In O'Meally's case, this added nothing to his sentence. Both were also sentenced to 12 strokes of the cat o'nine tails to be delivered in one session. This would be the first flogging since 1943. The order to flog O'Meally was appealed to the Supreme Court of Victoria and the High Court of Australia, both of whom upheld the order.

The flogging was delivered on 1 April 1958. Taylor and O'Meally were the last men flogged in Victoria. O'Meally said that the flogging opened his rib cage, that he was placed back in his cell with open chest and back wounds, and was not given any medical attention. He said he took three months to recover.

In June 1965 O'Meally's wife divorced him on the grounds of his imprisonment.

From February 1966 O'Meally spent four and a half years breaking rocks. He was moved again when he assaulted a warder and broke the warder’s false teeth. He was also placed in solitary confinement for two weeks.

O'Meally went on to become Victoria's longest serving prisoner. He served 27 years before being released on parole on 5 July 1979. The State Cabinet had accepted a recommendation of the Adult Parole Board. The State Governor, Sir Henry Winneke, ratified the decision. Sir Henry had led the prosecution of O'Meally at the 1952 murder trial.

O'Meally was last heard of living in Queensland and according to relatives, died in 2011 in Brisbane at the age of 92.

== Sources ==
- "In Their Honour…", Journal of the Police Association, Victoria, Volume 76 Issue 4 April 2010
- "Two Criminals To Be Whipped", The Advertiser, Adelaide, 1 November 1957
- Examiner (Launceston Tasmania), 24 May 1952
- Richardson, Hal; "O'Meally Sentenced to Death", The Argus Saturday 24 May 1952
- Sharpe, Alan, "The Man They Couldn't Break"; in 25 True Australian Crimes, Kingsclear Books, Sydney, 1997
- Walsh, Geoff; “Lonely Lifer sees the Light of day”, The Age, 5 July 1979,
- Willis, Richard, Murdoch, Lindsay & Comerford, Damien; “Freedom for O’Meally”, The Age, 5 July 1979,
- Osborne, Don, "Pentridge: Behind The Bluestone Walls", Echo Publishing, Sydney, 2015
