= Judicial corporal punishment in Afghanistan =

== Corporal punishment ==
Corporal punishment is the infliction of physical pain upon a person's body as punishment for a crime or infraction. Corporal punishment no longer exists in the legal systems of most developed nations around the world. It is explicitly prohibited by many international conventions on human rights including the United Nations "Standard Minimum Rules for the Treatment of Prisoners" and the European Convention on Human Rights.

Judicial corporal punishment is legal in Afghanistan and has been reported in recent history. In Afghanistan, corporal punishment is prohibited in schools, but it is still lawful in the home, in alternative and day care settings, in penal institutions, and as a sentence for crimes. There is no explicit prohibition of corporal punishment in Afghan law.

== Reports of corporal punishment ==
According to United Nations Assistance Mission in Afghanistan (UNAMA), all recent recorded instances of judicial corporal punishment have been lashings. UNAMA reports that, since the Taliban takeover in August 2021 until November 2022, at least eighteen instances of judicial corporal punishment have been carried out in Afghanistan. The majority of these punishments were in response to zina, adultery, or children who were caught running away from home. Crimes such as adultery may be punished with 100 lashes of a whip. Some kangaroo courts in the past have also ordered flogging for alcohol use, although a BBC report has claimed that this is rare.

Cases of corporal punishment increased in November 2022 when the leader of the Taliban called on judges to impose these punishments whenever Islamic law conditions were met. The Islamic Emirate of Afghanistan (IEA), however, has rejected UNAMA's claims as baseless. Zabihullah Mujahid, the spokesman for the Islamic Emirate of Afghanistan, claimed that "the judicial system in Afghanistan has become stronger than before... and the rights of the citizens are being respected in accordance to Islamic rules."

There are some regulations in regard to when flogging is permitted and prohibited. The flogging of innocent men and women can lead to consequences, however, blame is more often placed on the victim. In one particular case, three men were arrested for the illegal lashing of a 22-year-old woman. An investigation occurred and the three men who carried out the lashing were arrested, however, the woman was found guilty of "unknown charges" by the kangaroo court.

== See also ==
- Capital punishment in Afghanistan
