= Caning in Brunei =

Corporal punishment

Caning, also referred to as whipping in traditional British legislative terminology, is used as a form of judicial corporal punishment in Brunei. This practice is heavily influenced by Brunei's history as a British protectorate from 1888 to 1984. Similar forms of corporal punishment are also used in two of Brunei's neighbouring countries, Singapore and Malaysia, which are themselves former British colonies.

The courts routinely sentence adult male criminals to caning for a wide range of offences similar to those punishable by caning in Malaysia. It is usually, or possibly always, ordered in addition to a prison sentence. In the case of juvenile male offenders, however, caning is sometimes ordered as a single punishment without the prison term. The procedure is generally similar to that in Singapore and Malaysia.

== Judicial caning under criminal law ==
Sections 257–260 of Brunei's Criminal Procedure Code lay down the procedures governing caning, which is referred to as "whipping" in the Code in accordance with traditional British legislative terminology. The procedures include the following:

- Women, men above the age of 50, and men sentenced to death cannot be sentenced to caning.
- The offender cannot be sentenced to more than 24 strokes of the cane in a single trial. In the case of a juvenile offender, the number of strokes is capped at 18.
- The rattan cane used shall not be more than 0.5 inches (1.27 cm) in diameter.
- In the case of a juvenile offender, the caning is inflicted in the way of school discipline using a light rattan cane.
- A medical officer or hospital assistant is required to certify that the offender is in a fit state of health to undergo the punishment.
- If the medical officer or hospital assistant certifies that the offender is not in a fit state of health to be caned, the offender will be sent back to the court for the caning sentence to be remitted or converted to a prison term of up to 12 months, in addition to the original prison term he was sentenced to.

Under Bruneian criminal law, offences punishable by caning include causing hurt, assault, theft, robbery, extortion, and trespassing. It is a mandatory punishment for certain offences such as rape, kidnapping, and overstaying one's visa. Approximately 100 caning sentences are passed down every year in Brunei. In 2007, 68 foreign workers were sentenced to caning for immigration offences.

The modus operandi of judicial caning in Brunei appears to resemble that in Singapore more than that in Malaysia. It is not inflicted in instalments. During the punishment, the offender is tied to a wooden frame in a bent-over position with his feet together, and receives strokes from the rattan cane on the bare buttocks. The effects of caning, which include severe physical damage and permanent scarring, are generally the same across all the three countries.

News reports from Brunei show that the Prisons Department, from time to time, brings students on prison tours or hold talks in their schools to educate them on crime. During such visits, prison officials conduct demonstrations of caning on dummies.

=== Comparison of judicial caning in Brunei, Malaysia and Singapore ===
Judicial caning is also used as a form of legal punishment for criminal offences in two of Brunei's neighbouring countries, Malaysia and Singapore. There are some differences across the three countries.

	Brunei	Malaysia	Singapore
Sharia caning	In practice	In practice	Not in practice
Juveniles	Local courts may order the caning of boys below the age of 16. Juveniles are punished "in the way of school discipline" with their clothes on.	Local courts may order the caning of boys below the age of 16. Juveniles are punished "in the way of school discipline" with their clothes on.	Only the High Court may order the caning of boys below the age of 16.
Age limit	Men above the age of 50 cannot be sentenced to caning.	Men above the age of 50 cannot be sentenced to caning. However, the law was amended in 2006 such that men convicted of sex offences may still be sentenced to caning even if they are above the age of 50. In 2008, a 56-year-old man was sentenced to 57 years jail and 12 strokes of the cane for rape.	Men above the age of 50 cannot be sentenced to caning.
Maximum no. of strokes per trial	24 strokes for adults; 18 strokes for juveniles	24 strokes for adults; 10 strokes for juveniles	24 strokes for adults; 10 strokes for juveniles
Terminology	The official term is whipping in accordance with traditional British legislative terminology.	The official term is whipping in accordance with traditional British legislative terminology. Informally, the term caning, as well as strokes of the cane and strokes of the rotan, is used.	In both legislation and press reports, the term used is caning.
Dimensions of the cane	About 1.2 m (3.9 ft) long and no more than 1.27 cm (0.5 in) in diameter	About 1.09 m (3.6 ft) long and no more than 1.25 cm (0.49 in) in diameter	About 1.2 m (3.9 ft) long and no more than 1.27 cm (0.5 in) in diameter
Type of cane	The same type of rattan cane is used on all offenders regardless of the offence committed.	Two types of rattan canes are used: The smaller one is for white-collar offenders while the larger one is for other offenders.	The same type of rattan cane is used on all offenders regardless of the offence committed.
Modus operandi	The offender is tied to a wooden frame in a bent-over position with his feet together. He has protective padding secured around his lower back to protect the kidney and lower spine area from strokes that land off-target.	The offender stands upright at an A-shaped wooden frame with his feet apart and hands tied above his head. He has a special protective "shield" tied around his lower body to cover the lower back and upper thighs while leaving the buttocks exposed.	The offender is tied to the trestle in a bent-over position with his feet together. He has protective padding secured around his lower back to protect the kidney and lower spine area from strokes that land off-target.

== Caning under sharia law ==
In 2014, the Sultan of Brunei advocated the adoption of a sharia (syariah in Bahasa Melayu Brunei) penal code, which included whipping (caning) for certain offences. In February that year, an 18-member Bruneian delegation visited Saudi Arabia to learn about the implementation of the sharia penal code. The sharia penal code was enacted in 2014 and prescribes sharia-style whipping of up to 100 strokes for certain offences.

== Reformatory corporal punishment ==
Juvenile male offenders in reformatory institutions may be punished by "whipping with a light cane" for serious breaches of discipline. The maximum number of strokes allowed is ten if the offender is above 14, and six if the offender is 14 and below. A medical officer is required to be present to supervise the punishment.

== International criticism ==
Amnesty International considers Brunei's practice of judicial caning a form of torture, and points out that the sharia penal code contains provisions that violate human rights. However, Brunei has not ratified the United Nations Convention against Torture. In May 2013, Brunei elicited strong criticisms from internet users in Thailand after it sentenced two Thai nationals to imprisonment and three strokes of the cane each for overstaying their visa.
