= Capital punishment in Afghanistan =

Capital punishment is a legal penalty in Afghanistan and is conducted either in private or in public. The main methods of execution used in Afghanistan are hanging and shooting. Stoning, amputation, and flogging are also sometimes used as a method for punishment and were especially prominent during the late 1990s. Public executions have existed throughout Afghanistan's history. The Islamic Republic of Afghanistan took important steps away from the use of the death penalty, but they have continued with the Taliban returning to power in August 2021. Some executions have been recently condemned by the United Nations. UN experts have called on Afghan authorities "to halt immediately all forms of torturous, cruel, and degrading forms of punishments." The capital offenses in Afghanistan include a range of crimes from murder to adultery, and are governed by Islamic Sharia law, along with civil laws.

== Capital offenses ==
The capital offenses include the serious crimes and are governed by Sharia laws, along with civil laws. Offenses that can be punished by capital punishment include apostasy, arson, blasphemy, espionage, unlawful sexual intercourse, murder, perjury, and terrorism.

== Notable executions ==
- April 2004 – Abdullah Shah was executed by shooting inside Pul-e-Charkhi prison outside Kabul.
- October 2007 – Fifteen prisoners were executed by shooting inside Pul-e-Charkhi prison, including Reza Khan.
- June 2011 – Two mass killers were executed by hanging in Pul-e-Charkhi prison. One of the killers was Zar Ajam, a 17-year-old from Waziristan, Pakistan, who had randomly shot dead 40 people inside a branch of New Kabul Bank in Jalalabad.
- November 2012 – Fourteen prisoners were hanged inside Pul-e-Charkhi prison.
- October 2014 – Five men were executed by hanging inside Pul-e-Charkhi prison. The men were accused of robbery and gang rapes.
- May 2016 – Six men were executed by hanging inside Pul-e-Charkhi prison on charges of terrorism.
- December 2022 – One man who had confessed to murder was executed in public at a crowded sports stadium in Farah Province. This is the first instance of public execution since the Taliban returned to power in 2021.
- June 2023 – A man found guilty of murdering five people was sentenced to death and executed with an assault rifle by the son of one of his victims. The execution took place outside a mosque.
- February 2024 – Two men were convicted for separate murders were shot by the relatives of their victims and executed while thousands watched at stadium in Ghazni.
- February 2024 – A man convicted of murder was shot five times by the brother of the murdered man in a sports stadium in northern Afghanistan. This was the third death sentence of this nature to be carried out in a five-day span.

== See also ==
- Judicial corporal punishment in Afghanistan
- List of prisons in Afghanistan
- Capital punishment by country
