= Belting (beating) =

Use of a belt for corporal punishment

Belting is the use of belts made of strong materials (usually leather) as a whip-like instrument for corporal punishment (see that article for generalities). Although also used in educational institutions as a disciplinary measure, it has most often been applied domestically by parents. This practice has now been abolished by most schools, at least in the Western world, as it is seen by many as an abusive and excessive punishment.

The instigator might use their own belt (always at hand) or the one worn by the person to be punished. In other cases, especially in an institutional context, a separate belt is kept (e.g. in the head's office) solely for disciplinary use, and possibly displayed, again as a warning.

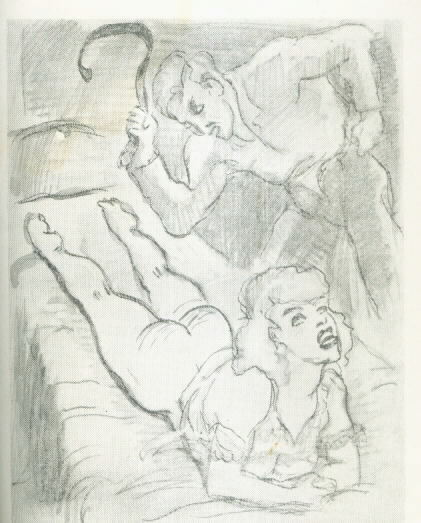
1930s illustration of spanking with a belt

The difference with a strapping, although in practice both terms are also used unprecisely as synonyms, is that a strap is harder, made from heavier and/or thicker leather, and may be specially made for discipline and have a handle (notably a prison strap), unlike a 'real' belt. They can be used for beating children.

The beating is usually administered to the bare buttocks or back or both of the recipient who bends over furniture or the punisher's lap. A belt might be used to lash in three ways:

- doubled by holding both ends in one hand, this halves its length (necessary in case of bending over knee or lap) but increases its effective thickness, both making it behave more like a strap.
- single, while holding the buckle or wrapping that around the fist; its weight is reduced which results in uneven impact, the severity increasing towards the tip of the belt.
- least common but most severe, holding the buckle-less end, so that the buckle can 'bite' the flesh particularly hard.

In domestic discipline it was mainly used by fathers (or males who represent a father figure), while mothers rather used a slipper, wooden spoon or spatula.

The term is also used figuratively for any beating in general, regardless of the implement (e.g. in Scotland, the tawse, a forked type of strap, was frequently called the belt) or even absence thereof, also in the figurative sense, such as a defeat or other unpleasant, painful and/or humiliating (e.g. verbal) treatment, or even an impersonal misfortune that feels strongly painful, such as a financial loss.

In Russia and other countries of the former USSR, belting has been a standard form of domestic corporal punishment of children. The punished child has usually lain flat on a sofa or bed while naked, or the children's neck or torso has been clutched between the punisher's legs. The belt has been implemented almost exclusively on bare buttocks, and sometimes on bare thighs. Some nervous parent could hit their child in the other parts of body, such as the bare genitals, but it has not been regarded as proper punishment and has been condemned by public opinion. Such persons could be prosecuted by law, while the law usually has not "noticed" "proper" domestic punishment, which has been also officially regarded as a form of child abuse. Today, the usage of corporal punishment of children in Russia, while still not effectively prohibited, is gradually declining just as it has in the Western world.
