= Birching =

Type of corporal punishment

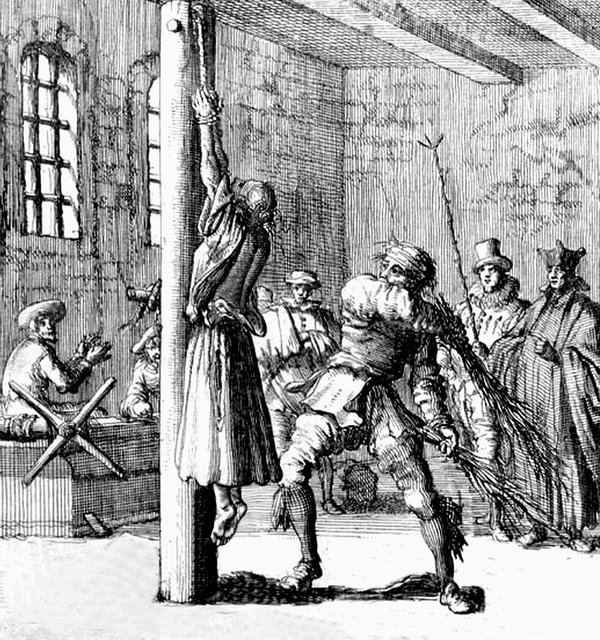
Birching of Anabaptist martyr Ursula van Beckum, Maastricht, 1570; engraving by Jan Luyken from Martyrs Mirror

Birching is a form of corporal punishment with a birch rod, typically used to strike the recipient's bare buttocks, although occasionally the back and/or shoulders.

== Implement ==
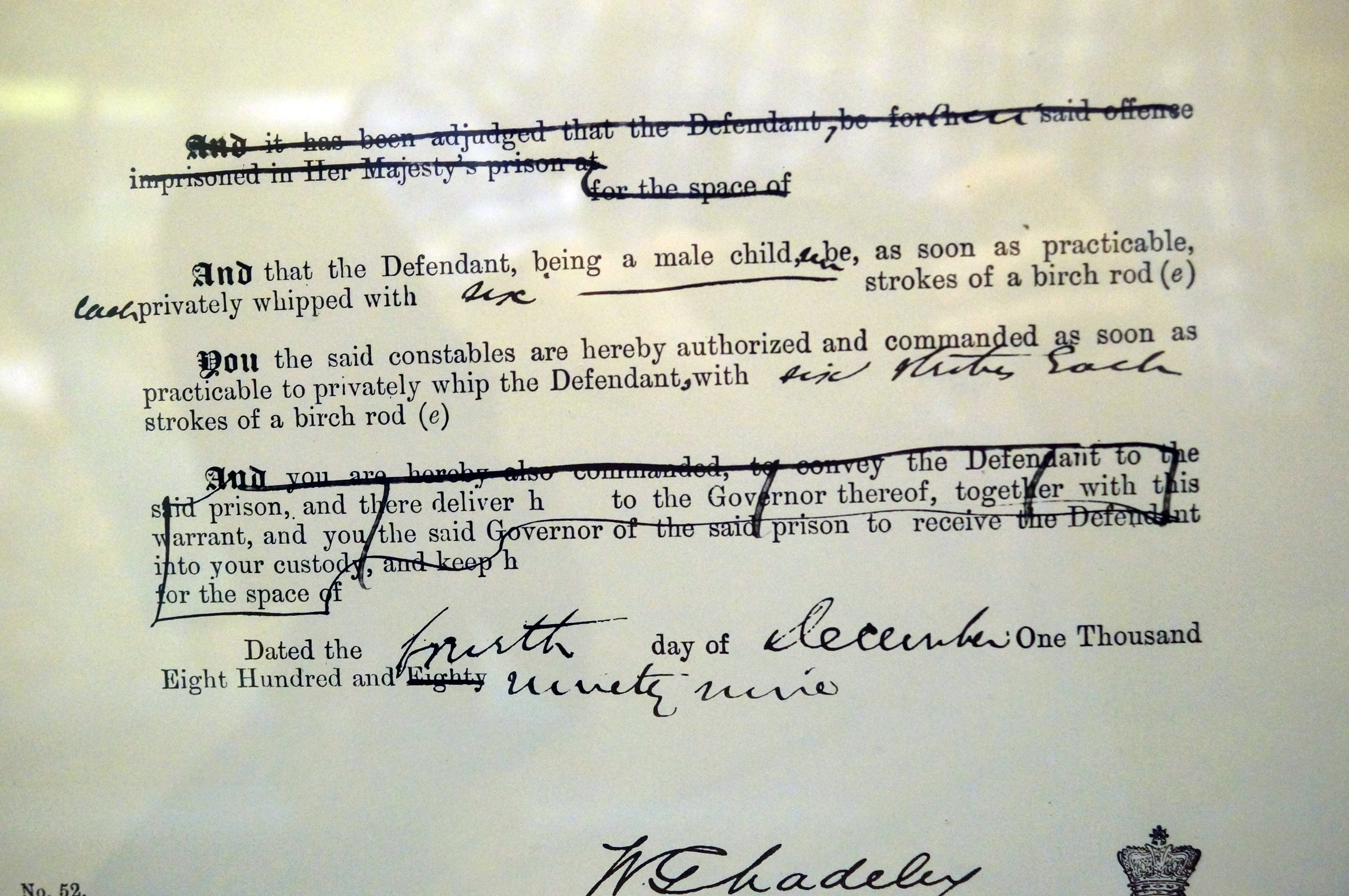
A magistrate's committal for birching of two children dated 4 December 1899 displayed in West Midlands Police Museum, Sparkhill, Birmingham, England

A birch rod (often shortened to "birch") is a bundle of leafless twigs bound together to form an implement for administering corporal punishment.

Contrary to what the name suggests, a birch rod is not a single rod and is not necessarily made from birch twigs, but can also be made from various other strong and smooth branches of trees or shrubs, such as willow. A hazel rod is particularly painful; a bundle of four or five hazel twigs was used in the 1960s and 1970s on the Isle of Man, the last jurisdiction in Europe to use birching as a judicial penalty.

Another factor in the severity of a birch rod is its size—i.e. its length, weight and number of branches. In some penal institutions, several versions were in use, which were often given names. For example, in Dartmoor Prison the device used to punish male offenders above the age of 16—weighing some 450 grams (16 oz), and 1.2 metres (48 in) long—was known as the senior birch.

In the 1860s, the Royal Navy abandoned the use of the cat o' nine tails on boy seamen. The cat had acquired a nasty reputation because of its use in prisons, and was replaced by the birch, with which the wealthy classes were more familiar, having been chastised with it during their schooling. Around the same time, the civilian courts system followed the Navy's example and switched to birches for the judicial corporal punishment of boys and young men, where previously a whip or cat had been used. In an attempt to standardise the Navy's birches, the Admiralty had specimens called patterned birch (as well as a patterned cane), kept in every major dockyard, as birches had to be procured on land in quantities.

The term judicial birch generally refers to the severe type in use for court-ordered birchings, especially the Manx hazel birch. A 1951 memorandum (possibly confirming earlier practice) ordered all UK male prisons to use birches (and cats-o'-nine-tails) from only a national stock at South London's Wandsworth prison, where they were to be 'thoroughly' tested before being supplied in triplicate to a prison whenever required for use as prison discipline.

By contrast, terms like "Eton birch" are used for a school birch made from smaller birch tree twigs.

== Position ==
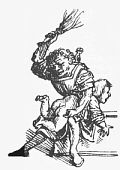
Medieval schoolboy birched on the bare buttocks (by Hans Holbein the Younger)

Only if the recipient was a small child could he or she practicably be punished over the knee of the applicant. Otherwise the child would be bent over an object such as a chair. For judicial punishments the recipient could even be tied down if likely to move about too much or attempt to escape.

In some prisons and reformatories, a wooden apparatus known as birching donkey or birching pony was specially constructed for birchings. As there were no detailed rules, prisons and police stations devised, adapted and used many different contraptions under various names that juvenile and adult offenders were bent over for punishment. Some models also allowed a standing or leaning position for other implements.

A simple alternative position known from school discipline is horsing, where the person to be punished is held by the arms over the back of another person (e.g. a classmate), or on the shoulders of two or more colleagues. However, at Eton College and schools of similar standing, the recipient was made to kneel on a special wooden block.

Another device used to immobilise offenders was a birching table, used in Scotland, with two holes in it through which the offender's arms were inserted but otherwise left free and untied. The offender's feet were tied into position and a strap fastened immediately above the waist.

Whatever position is adopted, care must be taken not to strike the back of the genitals (e.g. by having the recipient's legs kept together).

== History ==
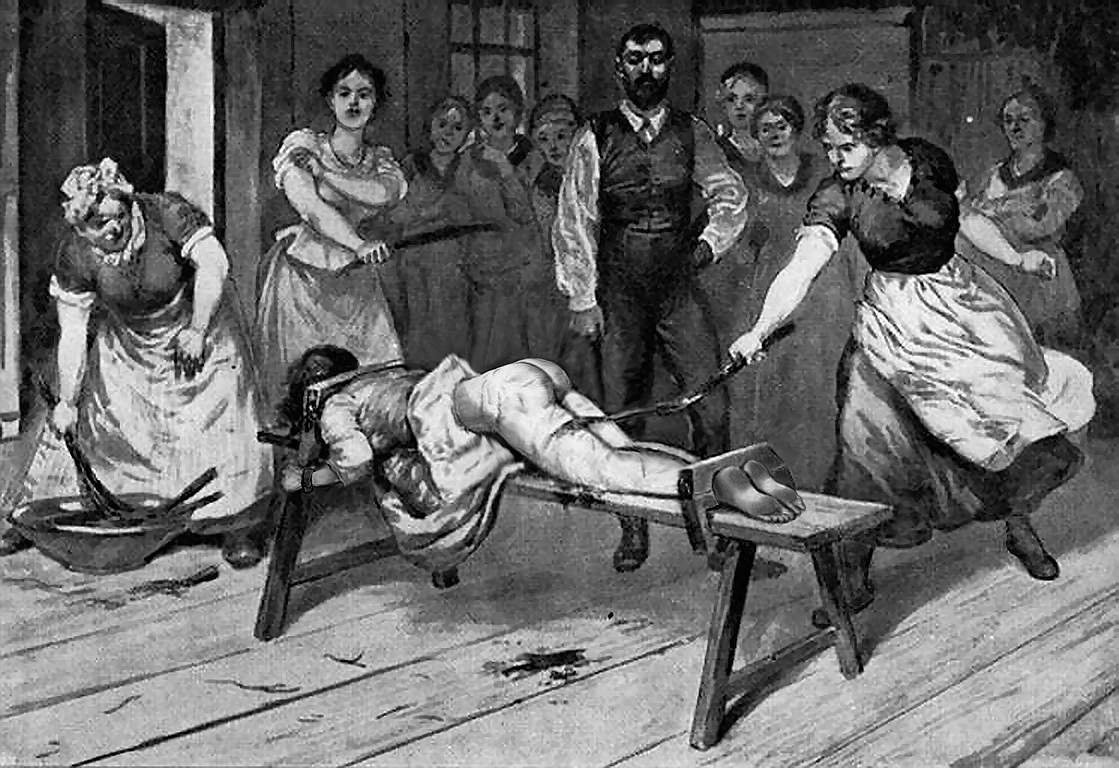
Birching in a women's prison, US (c. 1890)

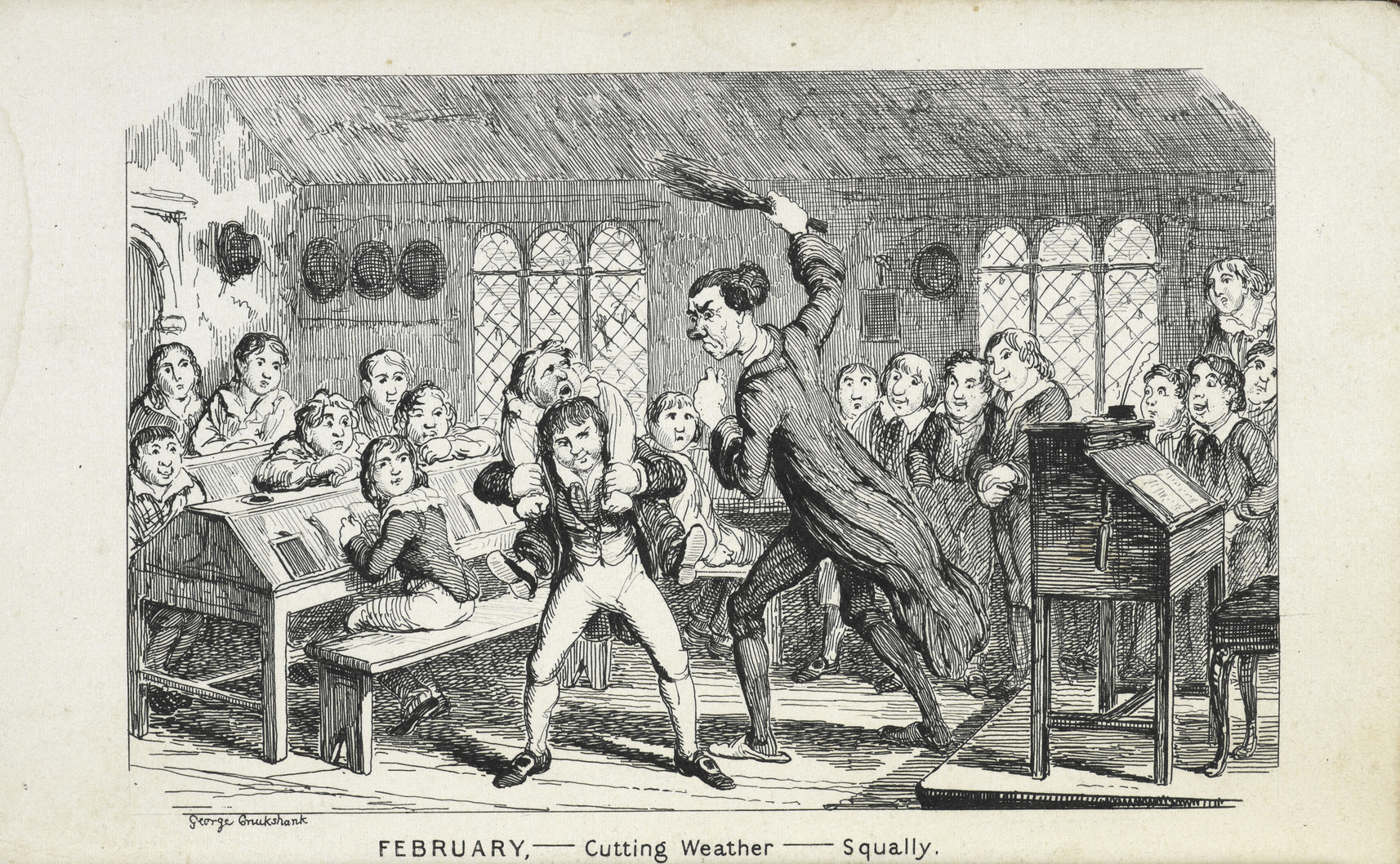
1839 caricature by George Cruikshank of a school flogging

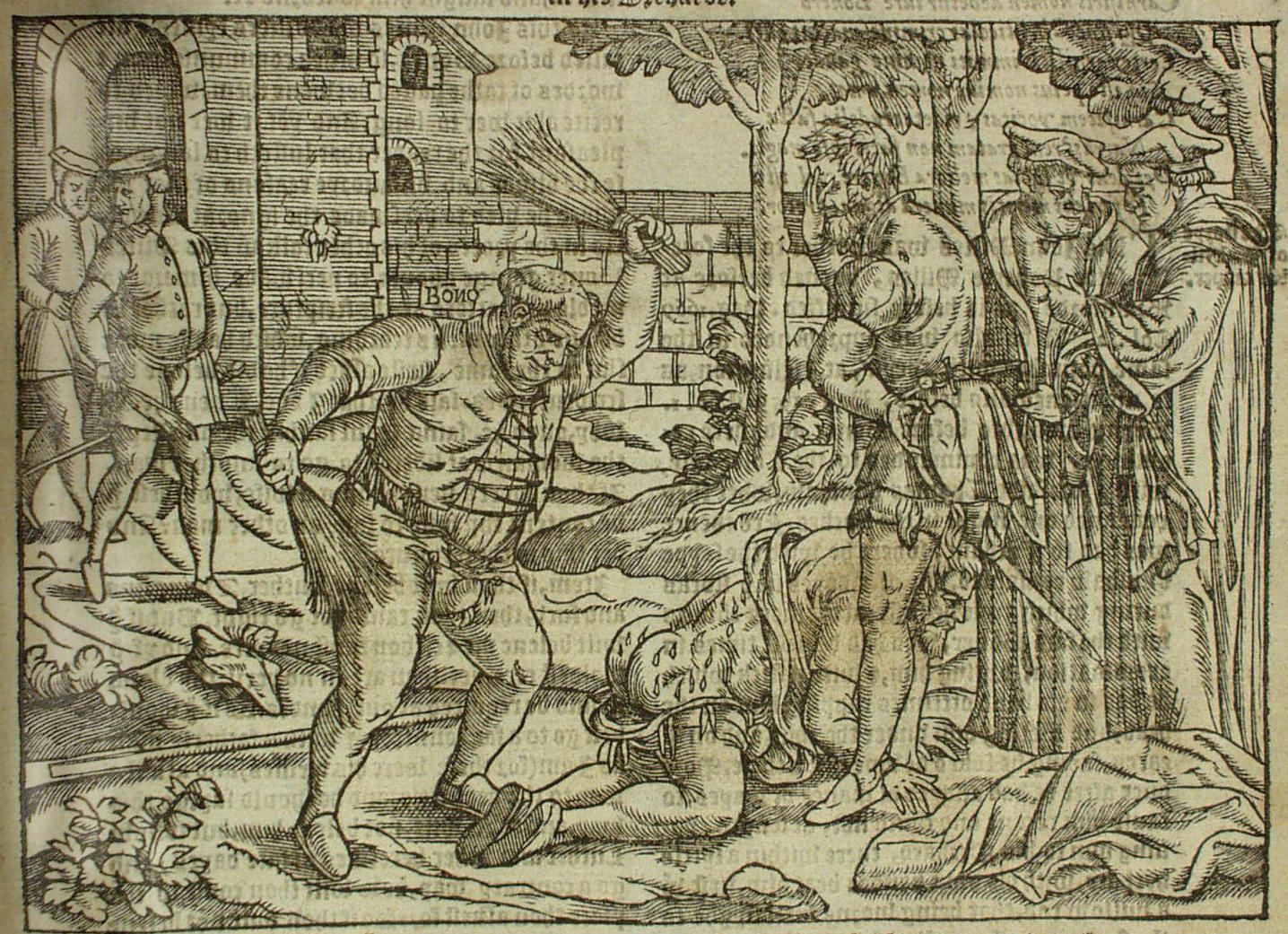
Edmund Bonner punishing a heretic in Foxe's Book of Martyrs (1563)

It was the most common school and judicial punishment in Europe up to the mid-19th century, when caning gained increasing popularity. According to some accounts, even the legendary sting of the cat o' nine tails was less feared than the birch in certain prisons. The birch was always applied to the bare buttocks (as also on the Continent), a humiliation usually befalling boys (like the boy's cat, likewise on the naked posterior), the 'adult' cat to the back or shoulders of adults; although in the 20th century, judges increasingly ordered the birch rather than the cat, even for robbery with violence (the only offence for which adult judicial corporal punishment was ordered in the latter decades of its use in mainland Britain).

Birching was also featured in the French Revolution. One leader of the revolution, Anne-Josèphe Théroigne de Méricourt, went mad, ending her days in an asylum after a public birching. On 31 May 1793 the Jacobin women seized her, stripped her naked, and flogged her on the bare bottom in the public garden of the Tuileries. Judicial birching in 20th-century Britain was used much more often as a fairly minor punishment for male juveniles, typically for petty larceny, rather than as a serious penalty for adult men. This was applied to boys aged up to 14 in England and Wales, and up to 16 in Scotland. In this juvenile version, the birch was much lighter and smaller, and the birch was administered privately by a policeman, usually immediately after the magistrate's court hearing, either in a room in the court building or at the nearest police station.

In Lewis Carroll's early poem The Two Brothers, 1853, one laments: "Oh would I were back at Twyford School, Learning lessons in fear of the birch!" as his sadistic brother uses him as fish bait.

Today birching is rarely used as a judicial punishment, and it has also almost completely died out as a punishment for children.

In the United Kingdom, birching as a judicial penalty, in both its juvenile and adult versions, was abolished in 1948, but it was retained until 1962 as a punishment for violent breaches of prison discipline. The punishment of birching and cat o' nine tails continued to be used in Northern Ireland into the 1940s.

The Isle of Man caused a good deal of controversy by continuing to birch young offenders until 1976. The birch was also used on offending teenage boys until the mid-1960s on the Channel Islands of Guernsey and Jersey.

In Trinidad and Tobago, the Corporal Punishment Act 1953 allows the High Court to order males, in addition to another punishment (often concurrent with a prison term), to undergo corporal punishment in the form of either a 'flogging' with a knotted cat o' nine tails (made of cords, as in the Royal Navy tradition) or a 'whipping' with a 'rod' [i.e. switch] of tamarind, birch or other switches, and it allows the President to approve other instruments; in 2000, the minimum age was raised from 16 to 18, the legal threshold of adulthood. It may now be the only country in the world still officially using the birch.

== Non-punitive uses ==
In Scandinavia, the Baltics, Russia and Finland there is a tradition called sauna whisking, in which one strikes their own body with soaked birch twigs in the sauna or banya, as a form of massage and to increase blood circulation and open the pores. The twigs are chosen carefully and do not have their leaves removed, and are often softened by keeping them in hot water prior to use. Being struck by the twigs induces a pleasant stinging sensation and very little actual pain.

== See also ==
- Switching
