= Strapping (punishment) =

Type of corporal punishment

Strapping refers to the use of a strap as an implement for corporal punishment that is applied either to the buttocks (see spanking) or the palm of the hand (known as hand strapping). The strap is typically a broad and heavy strip of leather, often with a hard handle. The tawse is a notable type of strap.

Some may use the term belting to describe strapping. The word "strap" is sometimes used to describe a leather paddle.

== Judicial ==
The historical strap, usually made for institutional use, is also known as a prison strap when used on adult convicts – either for discipline within the prison system, or as an original judicial corporal punishment, often combined with prison time, imposed by a court but carried out by prison staff. This has been the case notably in the US (mainly the South, e.g. Arkansas at least until 1967; sometimes a spanking inflicted on the trousers, sometimes bare bottom but also used on the back) and Canada (until 1972, delivered to the offender's bare buttocks).

Martin Tabert, a 22-year-old man arrested for vagrancy, died after being hit about 100 times with a 5-foot leather strap in 1921. The strapping was punishment for Tabert failing to perform his work as part of a prison work gang in Leon County, Florida. He was weak with malaria at the time. Sheriff J. R. Jones had "sold" the man to the head of the work-gang for a twenty-five dollar fee. Cavalier County (North Dakota) States Attorney Gudmunder Grimson and New York World reporter Samuel "Duff" McCoy brought the case to national attention. The World won the 1924 Pulitzer Prize for Public Service for its coverage of the incident. A ballad by Marjory Stoneman Douglas memorialized the case. The whipping-boss, Walter Higginbotham, was charged with Tabert's murder but acquitted. Florida's then-governor Cary Hardee outlawed the use of flogging in the wake of public outrage over the death, and brought an end to the convict lease system in the state.

== Reformatories and schools ==
The strap has also been used on minors in reformatories and in schools. The latter was particularly prevalent in Canada, applied to the student's hand, until the practice was abolished in 2004, but there, in modern times at least, it was generally made of canvas/rubber rather than leather.

The tawse was historically used in Scottish and some English schools.

== BDSM ==
Strapping can be done consensually as part of erotic spanking.

== See also ==
- Belting
- Tawsing
