= Cat o' nine tails =

Type of whip

The cat-o'-nine-tails, commonly shortened to the cat, is a type of multi-tailed whip or flail. It originated as an implement for physical punishment, particularly in the Royal Navy and British Army, and as a judicial punishment in Britain and some other countries.

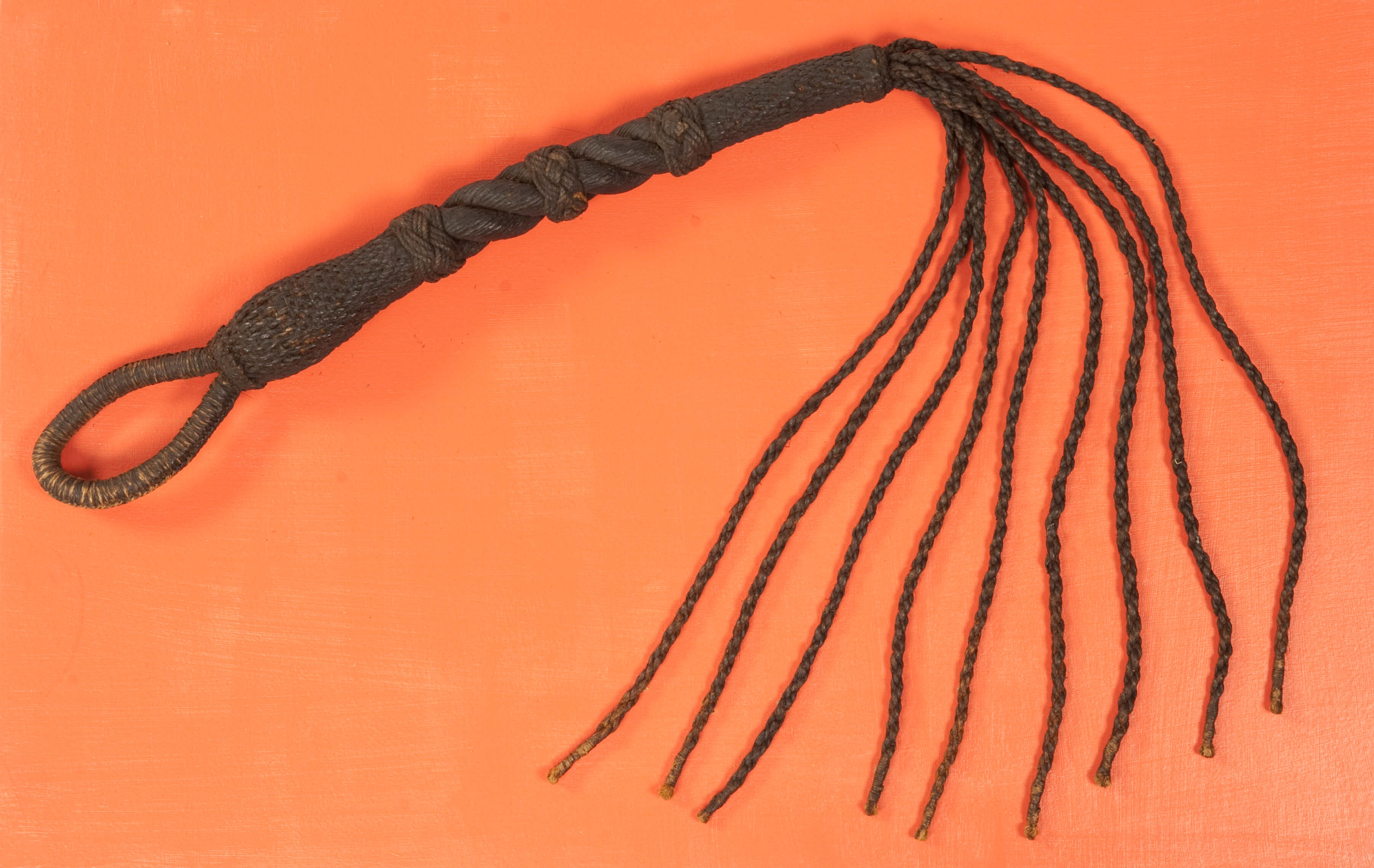
19th-century cat o' nine tails, 97 centimetres (38 1/4 in) long, composed of nine lengths (approximately 46 centimetres or 18 inches) of tarred, braided hemp with ends lashed

== Etymology ==
The term first appears in 1681 in reports of a London murder. The term came into wider circulation in 1695 after its mention by a character in William Congreve's play Love for Love. There are equivalent terms in many languages and also some analogous terms referring to a similar instrument's number of tails (cord or leather), such as the Dutch zevenstaart (seven tail[s]), negenstaart (nine tail[s]), the Spanish gato de nueve colas or the Italian gatto a nove code.

== Description ==
The cat is made up of nine knotted thongs of cotton cord, about 75 centimetres (2 1/2 ft) long, designed to lacerate the skin and cause intense pain.

It traditionally has nine thongs as a result of the manner in which rope is plaited. Thinner rope is made from three strands of yarn plaited together, and thicker rope from three strands of thinner rope plaited together. To make a cat o' nine tails, a rope is unraveled into three small ropes, each of which is unraveled again.

The 19th-century British naval cat was made out of a piece of rope, thicker than a man's wrist (about 6 centimetres or 2 1/2 inches), 1.5 metres (5 ft) in length. The first 90 centimetres (3 ft) were stiff and solid, and the remaining 60 centimetres (2 ft) unraveled into hard twisted and knotted ends.

== Historical punishments ==
=== Naval types and use ===
The naval cat weighed about 370 grams (13 oz) and was composed of a handle connected to nine thinner pieces of line, with each line knotted several times along its length. Formal floggings — those ordered by captain or court martial — were administered ceremonially on deck, the crew being summoned to "witness punishment" and the prisoner being brought forward by marines with fixed bayonets.

In the British navy, the boatswain's mate stood two steps from the offender, combing out the tails of the cat due to the thinner parts of the cat sticking to each other. He would then swing it over his head, make a step forward and, bending his body to give more force to the blow, deliver the stroke at the full sweep of his arm.

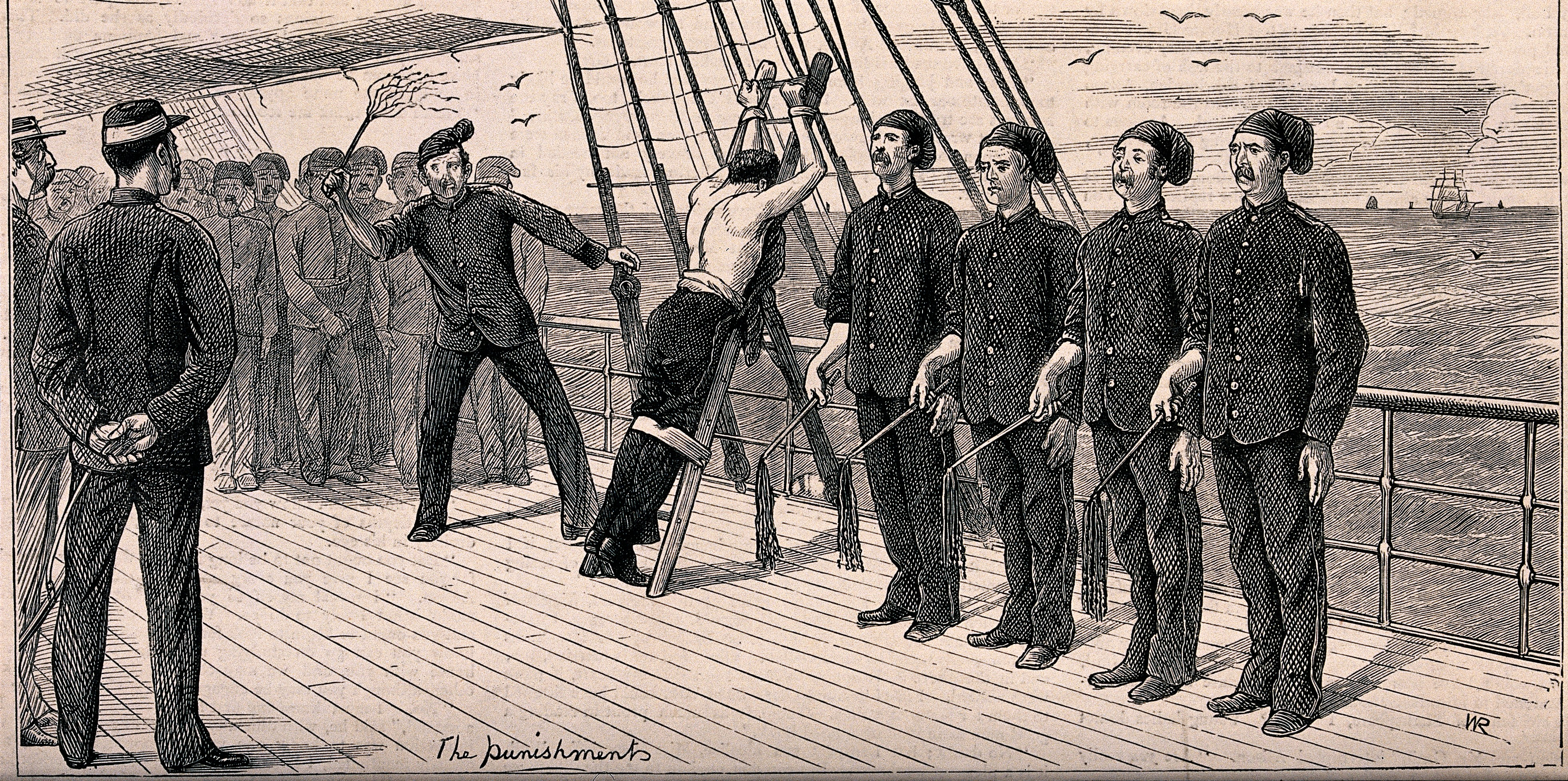
Sailor being flogged with a cat-o'-nine-tails while four sailors are waiting for their turn to flog him

Drunkenness could be punished by a dozen lashes, which could be administered on the authority of the ship's captain. Greater punishments were generally administered following a formal court martial, with Royal Navy records reflecting some standard penalties of 200 lashes for desertion, 300 for mutiny, and up to 500 for theft. One blow was sufficient to take off the skin, and to draw blood wherever the knots fell. Three dozen was a common punishment. 300 lashes were frequently given. The offence of sodomy generally drew the death penalty, though one 18th century court martial awarded a punishment of 1000 lashes – an equivalent sentence as it would likely be fatal.

For summary punishment of Royal Navy boys, a lighter model was made, known as boy's cat or boy's pussy, that had only five tails of smooth whip cord. If formally convicted by a court martial, however, even boys would suffer the punishment of the adult cat. While adult sailors received their lashes on the back, they were administered to boys on the bare posterior, usually while "kissing the gunner's daughter" (publicly bending over a gun barrel), just as boys' lighter "daily" chastisement was usually over their (often naked) rear-end (mainly with a cane—this could be applied to the hand, but captains generally refused such impractical disablement—or a rope's end). Bare-bottom discipline was a tradition of the English upper and middle classes, who frequented public schools, so midshipmen (trainee officers, usually from 'good families', getting a cheaper equivalent education by enlisting) were not spared. Still, it is reported that the 'infantile' embarrassment of prolonged, public bare-bottom punishment was believed essential for optimal deterrence; cocky miscreants might brave the pain of the adult cat in the macho spirit of "taking it like a man" or even as a "badge of honour". Similarly, in America, George Washington, during the Revolutionary War, insisted that the maximum punishment be increased from 39 lashes to 100 lashes, as the former was not considered sufficiently severe.

=== British Army ===
A soldier who was flogged in 1832, with a cat similar to that used in the King's fleet, said: "I felt an astounding sensation between the shoulders, under my neck, which went to my toe-nails in one direction, and my finger-nails in another, and stung me to the heart, as if a knife had gone through my body. He came on a second time a few inches lower, and then I thought the former stroke was sweet and agreeable compared with that one. I felt my flesh quiver in every nerve, from the scalp of my head to my toe-nails. The time between each stroke seemed so long as to be agonising, and yet the next came too soon. The pain in my lungs was more severe, I thought, than on my back. I felt as if I would burst in the internal parts of my body. I put my tongue between my teeth, held it there, and bit it almost in two pieces. What with the blood from my tongue, and my lips, which I had also bitten, and the blood from my lungs, or some other internal part, ruptured by the writhing agony, I was almost choked, and became black in the face. Only fifty had been inflicted, and the time since they began was like a long period of life; I felt as if I had lived all the time of my real life in pain and torture, and that the time when existence had pleasure in it was a dream, long, long gone by."

== See also ==
- Flagellation
- Scourge
- Tawse
