= Gonfalon =

Banner hung from a crossbar on a staff

Gonfalon of the comune of Torre Annunziata in Naples

The gonfalon, gonfanon, gonfalone (from the early Italian confalone) is a type of heraldic flag or banner, often pointed, swallow-tailed, or with several streamers, and suspended from a crossbar in an identical manner to the ancient Roman vexillum. It was first adopted by Italian medieval communes, and later, by local guilds, corporations and districts. The difference between a gonfalon with long tails and a standard is that a gonfalon displays the device on the non-tailed area, and the standard displays badges down the whole length of the flag.

== Background ==
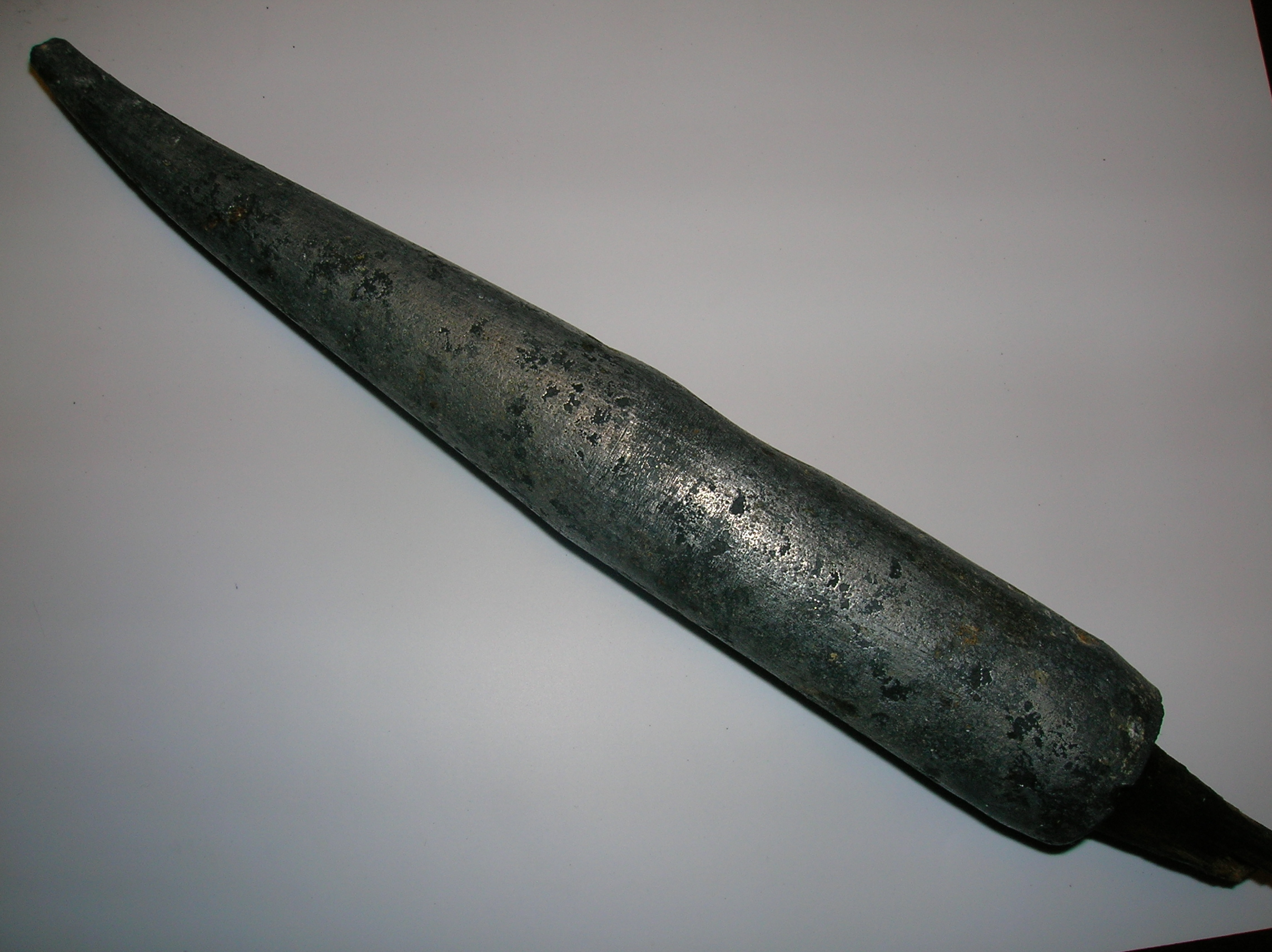
The tip of a gonfalon from the 1839 Eglinton Tournament as held at Eglinton Castle in Scotland

A gonfalon can include a badge or coat of arms, or decoration. Today, every Italian comune (municipality) has a gonfalon sporting its coat of arms. The gonfalon has long been used for ecclesiastical ceremonies and processions. The papal "ombrellino", a symbol of the pope, is often mistakenly called "gonfalone" by the Italians because the pope's ceremonial umbrella was often depicted on the banner.

Gonfalons are also used in some university ceremonies, such as those at The College of New Jersey, University of Chicago, Rowan University, Rutgers University, Princeton University, University of Toronto, Loyola University New Orleans, the University of St. Thomas, and the University of Western Ontario.

A Gonfalon of State (Dutch: Rijksvaandel or Rijksbanier) is part of the Regalia of the Netherlands. The banner is made of silk and it has been painted with the sovereign's coat of arms. The Gonfalon of State is only used when a new king or queen is sworn in.

A picture of a gonfalon is itself a heraldic charge in the coat of arms of the Counts Palatine of Tübingen and their cadet branches.

== Religious significance ==
These religious objects consisted of a cloth, usually of canvas but occasionally of silk, supported by a wooden frame with a T-shaped support on the back, and a long pole to hold up the banner during ceremonies and processions. The banners were painted with tempera or oil paints, sometimes on both sides. Images on the gonfalons included the patron saints of cities, villages, confraternities or guilds, the Virgin and Child, Jesus Christ, God the Father, Plague Saints, and the Virgin Mary as Queen of Heaven, Mediatrix, Theotokos, or Madonna of Mercy. Because these banners were often associated with a particular group, highly unusual and individual iconography could appear.

These gonfalons were often commissioned and kept by confraternities, lay religious groups who gathered together for devotional purposes such as the singing of hymns (laudae), the performance of charitable works, or flagellation. The banners would be either displayed on the wall of the oratory or packed away until they were needed for their primary use, religious processions. During processions, the banner would be carried on its pole by members of the confraternity. This devotional act of carrying the banner in procession was believed to be a holy act of worship, and it was hoped that the act would gain divine favour from God, Jesus, Mary, and the saints portrayed on the banner. From the thirteenth to the sixteenth centuries, plague banners were produced and carried in processions as a way to plead for divine intercession to prevent or cure the plague.

== See also ==
- "Baseball's Sad Lexicon", 1910 poem referring to a baseball championship pennant as a "gonfalon"
- Banner of arms
- Fanion
- Flagellant confraternities
- Gonfaloniere
- Khorugv, a gonfalon analogue in Christian churches of East-European origin
- Pennon
- Vexillum
