= Knout =

Type of whip

A knout /ˈnaʊt/ (Russian: кнут, Russian pronunciation: [knut]) is a Russian whip that consists of a rawhide thong or a rope attached to a long wooden handle. Commonly used for prodding horses or cattle, knouts were also used for flagellation as a corporal punishment in Russian history. The English word is a spelling-pronunciation of a French transliteration of the Russian word кнут (knut), which means "whip".

== Etymology ==
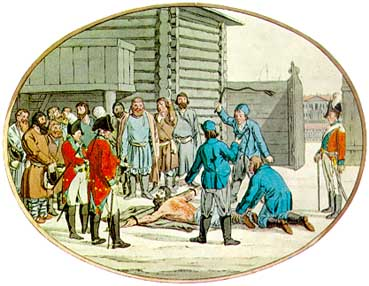
Punishment with a knout

The word may be derived from the Swedish knutpiska, a kind of whip with knots. The stem knut is of generic Germanic origin; compare with the German Knute, Dutch knoet (both meaning knout) and with Old Norse knutr, Anglo-Saxon cnotta and English knot.

== For corporal punishment ==
According to Brockhaus and Efron, a typical knout used by Russian executioners consisted of a wooden handle about half arshin (35 cm (14 in)) to which attached was a thick braided rawhide piece, one arshin (70 cm (28 in)) long. The latter piece ended in a metal ring, to which was attached a wide rawhide belt made as long, also of one arshin length with a stiffened beak-like end.

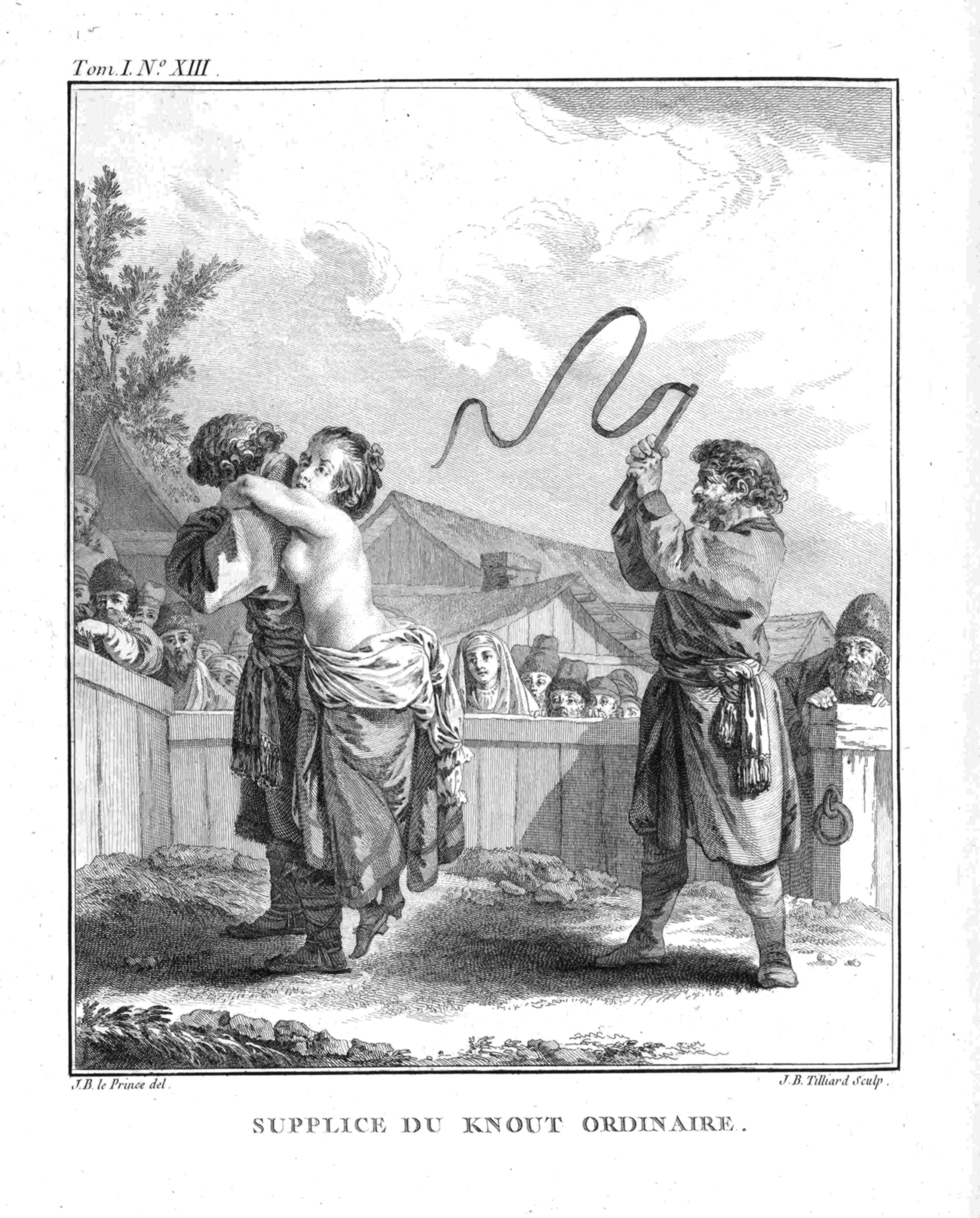
"Punishment with an Ordinary Knout" (1766), depicting the flogging of Natalia Lopukhina

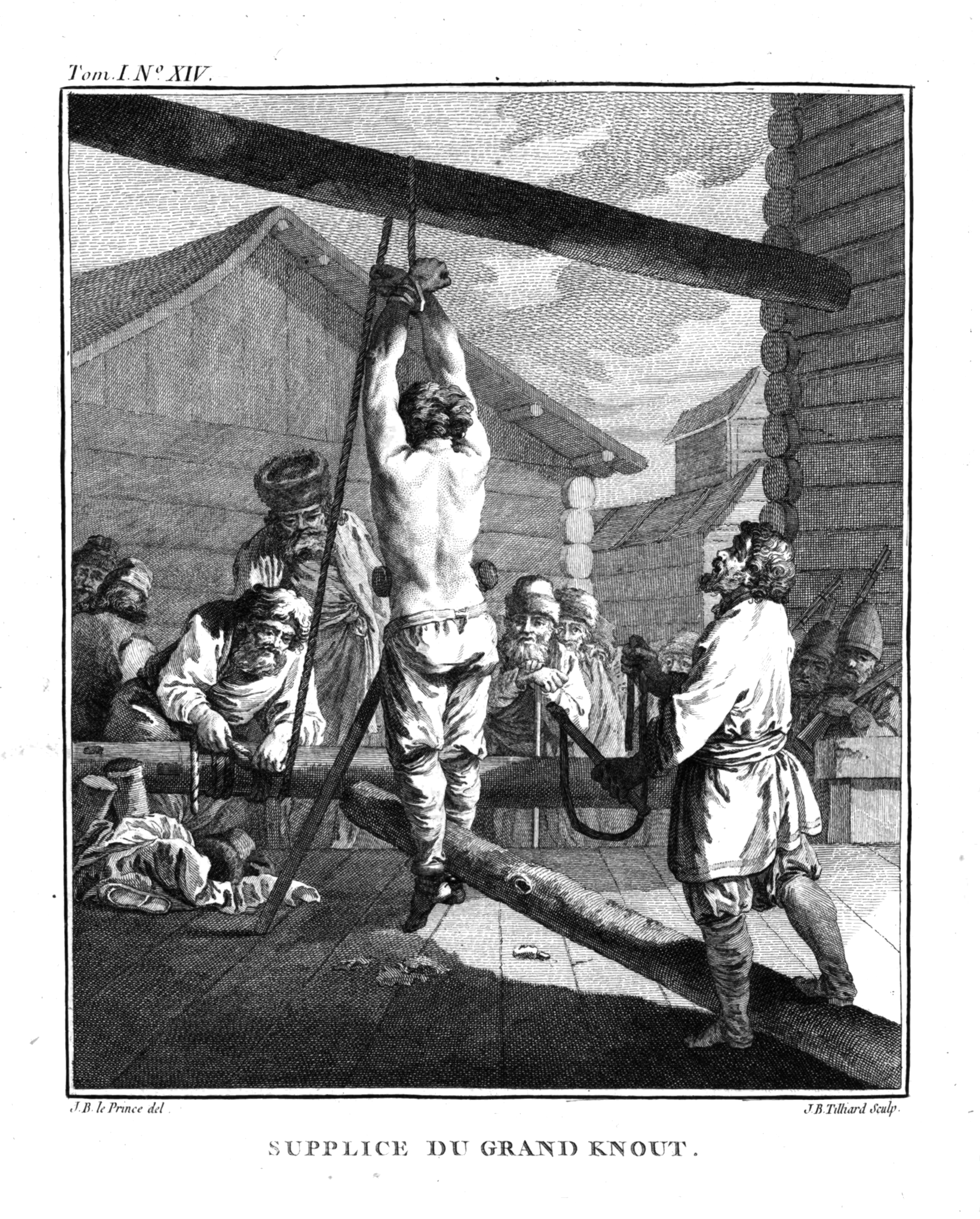
"Punishment with a Great Knout" (1765)

Knouts were used in Russia for flogging as formal corporal punishment of criminals and political offenders. The victim was tied to a post or on a triangle of wood and stripped, receiving the specified number of strokes on the back. A sentence of 100 or 120 lashes was equivalent to a death sentence.

Emperor Nicholas I abolished punishment by knout in 1845, after years of deliberation, and replaced it with the pleti, a lighter whip, commonly with three tails, which was used previously for punishment as well.

== See also ==
- Nagaika
