= Plague Saints =

The Plague Saints were saints in Catholic and Orthodox Christian plague culture believed to protect against the plague. Numbering over 100, these saints included some whose renown was mostly local, such as the patron saints of Catholic towns like Saint Adrian and Saint Anthony, and also more prominent saints like Gregory the Great, who in 590 was consecrated as Pope during a plague year. Gregory reportedly ordered an image of Mary the Mother of Jesus be carried in his inaugural procession, described by the Golden Legend: "The poisonous uncleanliness of the air yielded to the image as if fleeing from it and being unable to withstand its presence".

In 1414, when plague broke out during the Council of Constance, the priests ordered public prayer and processions in honor of St. Roche, and the plague was said to have abated immediately.

During an outbreak of plague in Milan in 1576 Bishop Carlo Borromeo, who was later canonized, was said to have visited the homes of the afflicted, ministered to the sick at the plague hospital of St. Gregory, and walked in procession barefoot, in penance for his congregation, with a rope around his neck and carrying a relic of the Holy Nail. During the Counter-Reformation images of San Carlo proliferated in Catholic churches, depicting his fight against the plague by the power of the sacrament of the Eucharist. Scholars have speculated that this imagery may carry a double meaning of the "plague" of the Reformation. Other local figures who were considered plague saints were Nicholas of Tolentino and Saint Rosalia.

== Depictions ==
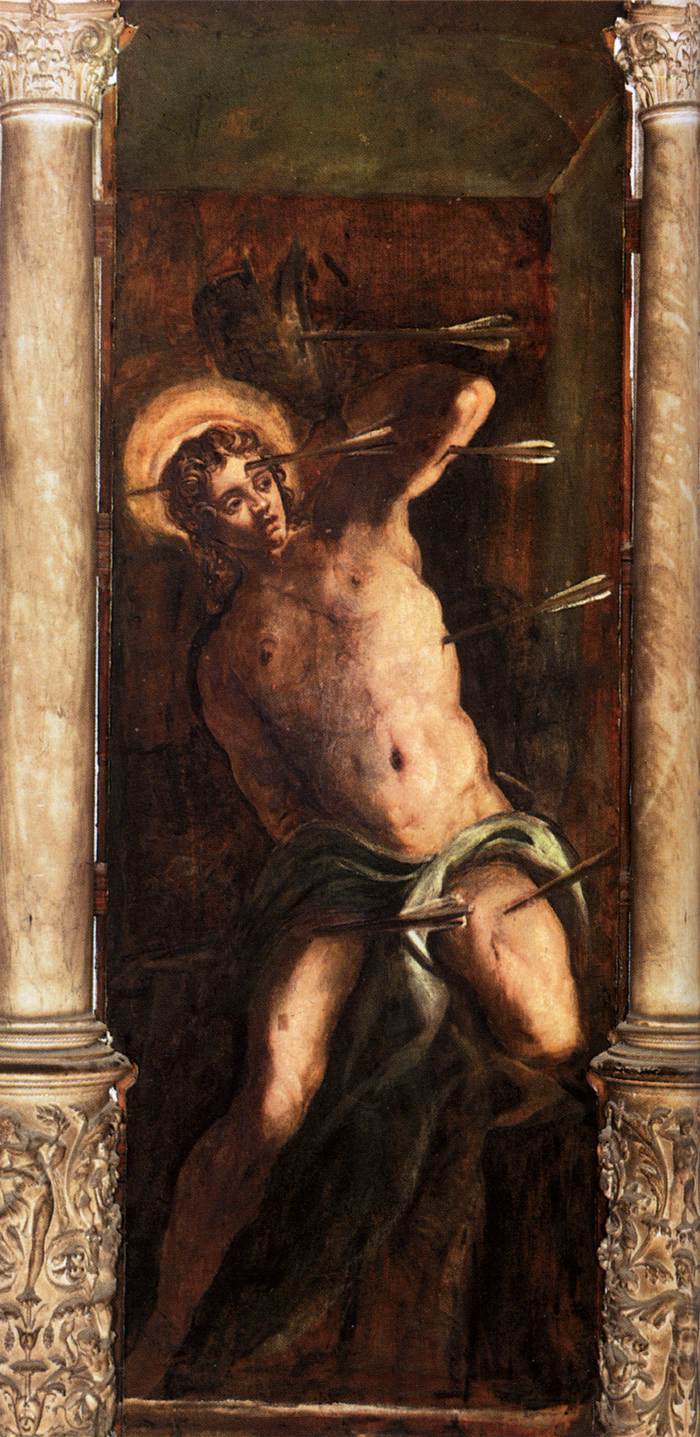
Saint Sebastian by Jacopo Tintoretto at the Scuola Grande di San Rocco in Venice

The plague saints are depicted on city gates, and in panel paintings and fresco cycles in works that were commissioned by religious orders, clergy and others. Saint Sebastian has been painted by many well-known Renaissance artists such as Raphael, El Greco, Holbein, Guido Reni, Piero del Pollaiuolo, Mantega, Giovanni Bellini and Perugino.

There were mass-produced images as well like engravings and broadsheets. Sebastian is depicted in a Florentine engraving from the 1470s that includes the text of an invocation that the purchaser is recommended to recite. A similar engraving shows the cessation of plague in Rome after Sebastian's body is recovered from the well, based on the claim from the Golden Legend that in when Italy was ravaged by plague during the 8th century it was divinely revealed that "plague would never cease" until his body was recovered from the well where it had been dumped, and an altar raised for him in Pavia. San Carlo was the subject of a series of engravings known as Vita, et Miracoli di San Carlo Borromeo that was released in 1610, the same year the bishop was canonized.

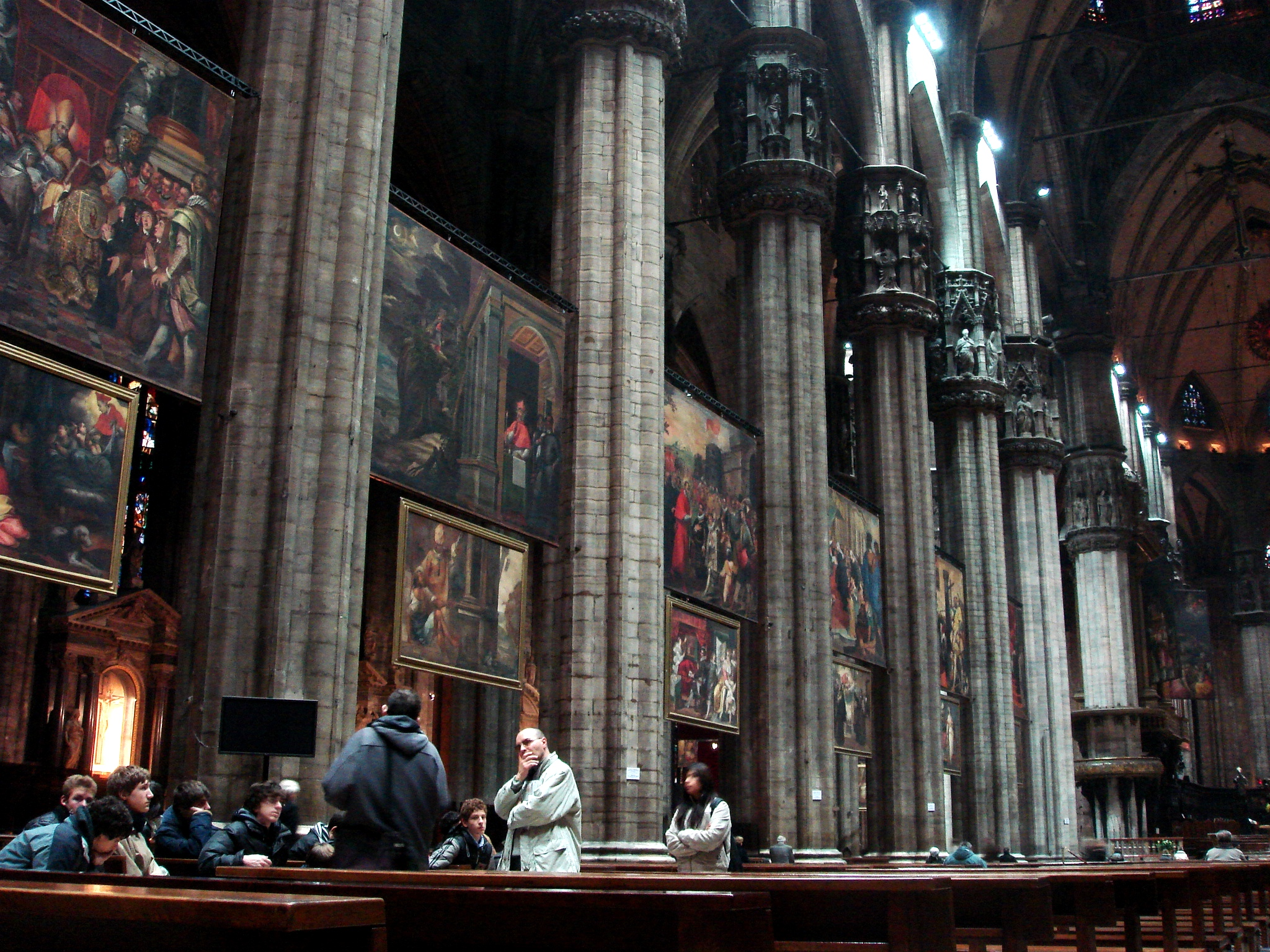
Quadroni of St. Charles

St. Roche was identified in most depictions by a plague bubo on his thigh. St. Roche and Sebastian are often shown together. Jacopo Tintoretto painted the ceiling of the Scuola Grande di San Rocco, a confraternity for the sick and poor in Venice, with the Glorification of St. Rocco and depictions of Roche and Sebastian. A 16th century print by Erhard Schön intended for plague broadsheets also showed Sebastian and Roche.

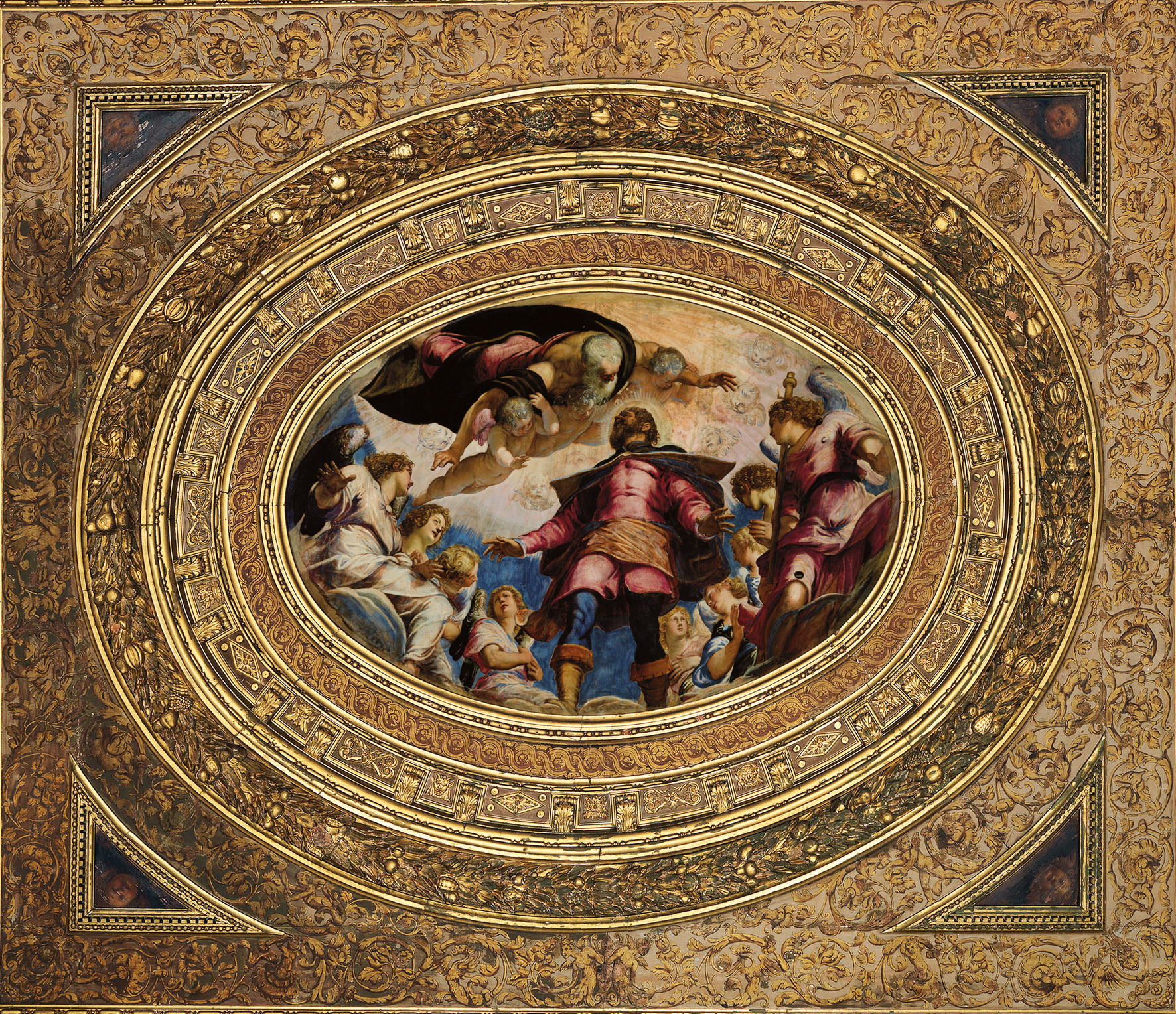
Glorification of Saint Roch

== Reformation countries ==
Plague imagery in England was very different because of the Reformation; saints were not part of popular imagery and did not play any intercessionary role as they did in Catholic Europe. In Italy, there was less of a need to explain the plague because of the role art played in interactions between the Church and the public. However, in England, the Scripture was the primary source for teachings that the plague was an instrument of God's judgement upon the sinful.

== Sources ==
- Byrne, J. P. (2012). Encyclopedia of the Black Death. United States: ABC-CLIO.
- Gilman, E. B. (2009). Plague Writing in Early Modern England. Ukraine: University of Chicago Press.
- Cleary, Gregory (1912). Catholic Encyclopedia (Vol. 13 ed.). New York City: Robert Appleton Company.
