= Khorugv =

Flag or similar object carried as part of a religious procession

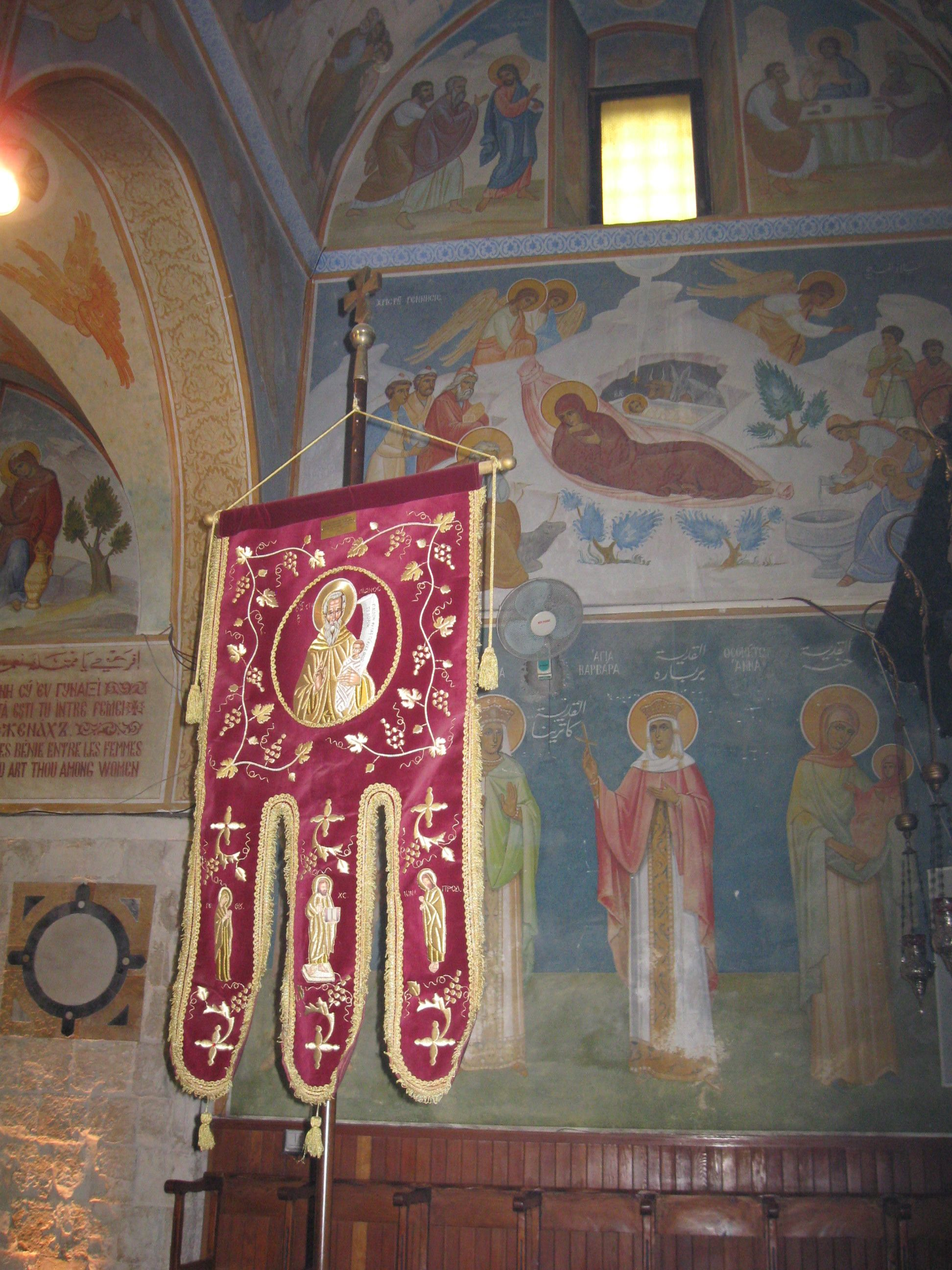
Red banner embroidered with an icon of a saint (Church of St. Gabriel, Nazareth).

Khorugv (Russian: хоругвь, Bulgarian: хоругва, Church Slavonic: хорѫгꙑ, Ukrainian: хоругва, Polish: chorągiew, Romanian: prapur, Finnish: kirkkolippu, sometimes translated as gonfalon) is a religious banner used liturgically in the Eastern Orthodox, Eastern Lutheran and Eastern Catholic Churches.

The khorugv or banner consists of an icon of Christ, the Theotokos or a saint, either painted or embroidered on a rectangular piece of cloth. The cloth is often pointed or swallow-tailed, or has several streamers coming down from it. The banner often has two or three tails on it, each terminating in a tassel, and may be fringed around the edges. It is suspended from a crossbar which is attached horizontally to a long vertical pole (see the article Gonfalon for a picture). The finial at the top of the pole is usually a cross. More rarely, banners can also be made of metalwork, or carved out of wood.

Banners are carried in a religious procession known as Holy Cross Processions (Russian: крестный ход, krestny khod), and when not being carried are usually displayed in the church.

== The use of banners in the Church ==
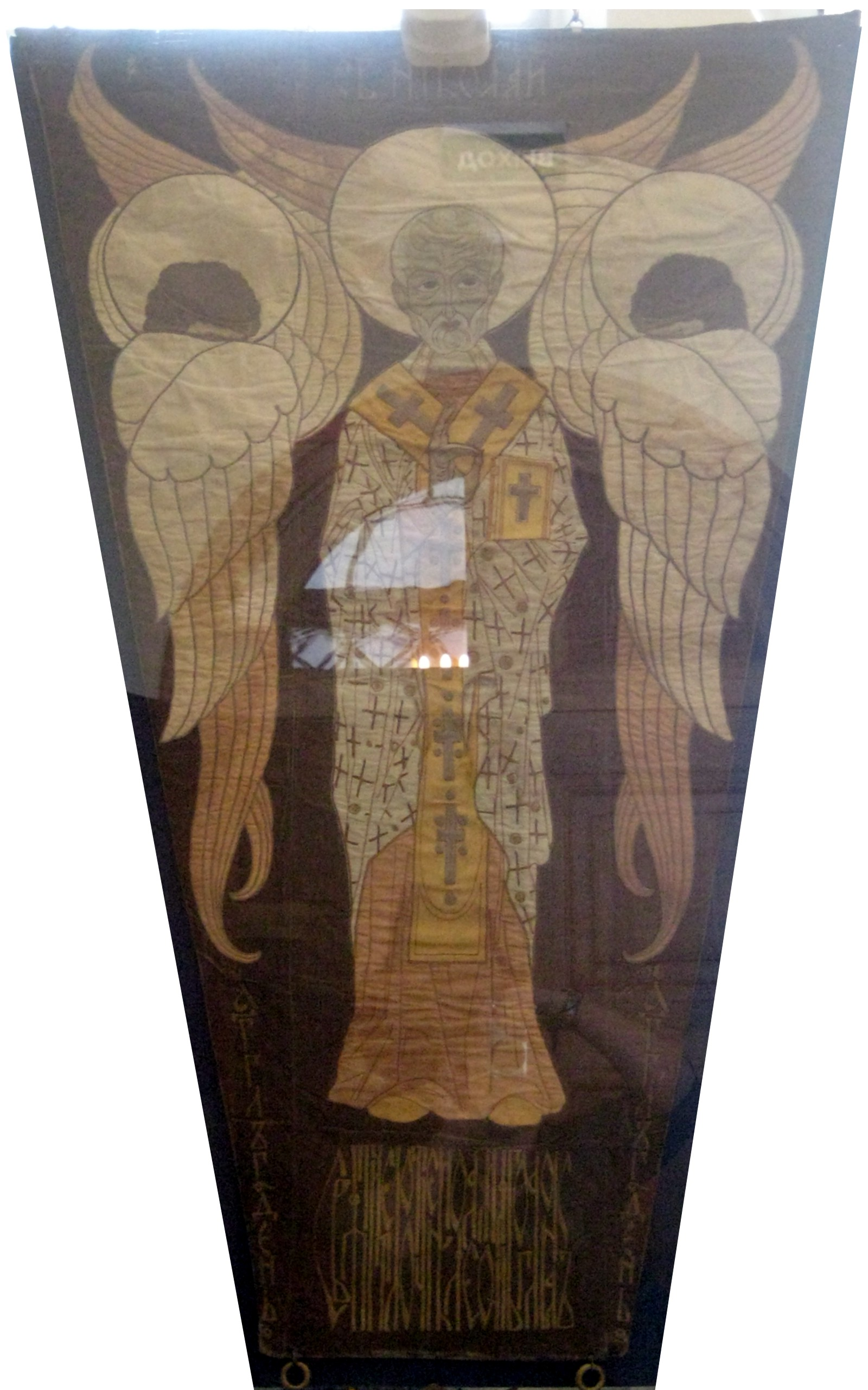
Khorugv "Saint Nicholas with archangels", Russia, early 20th century.

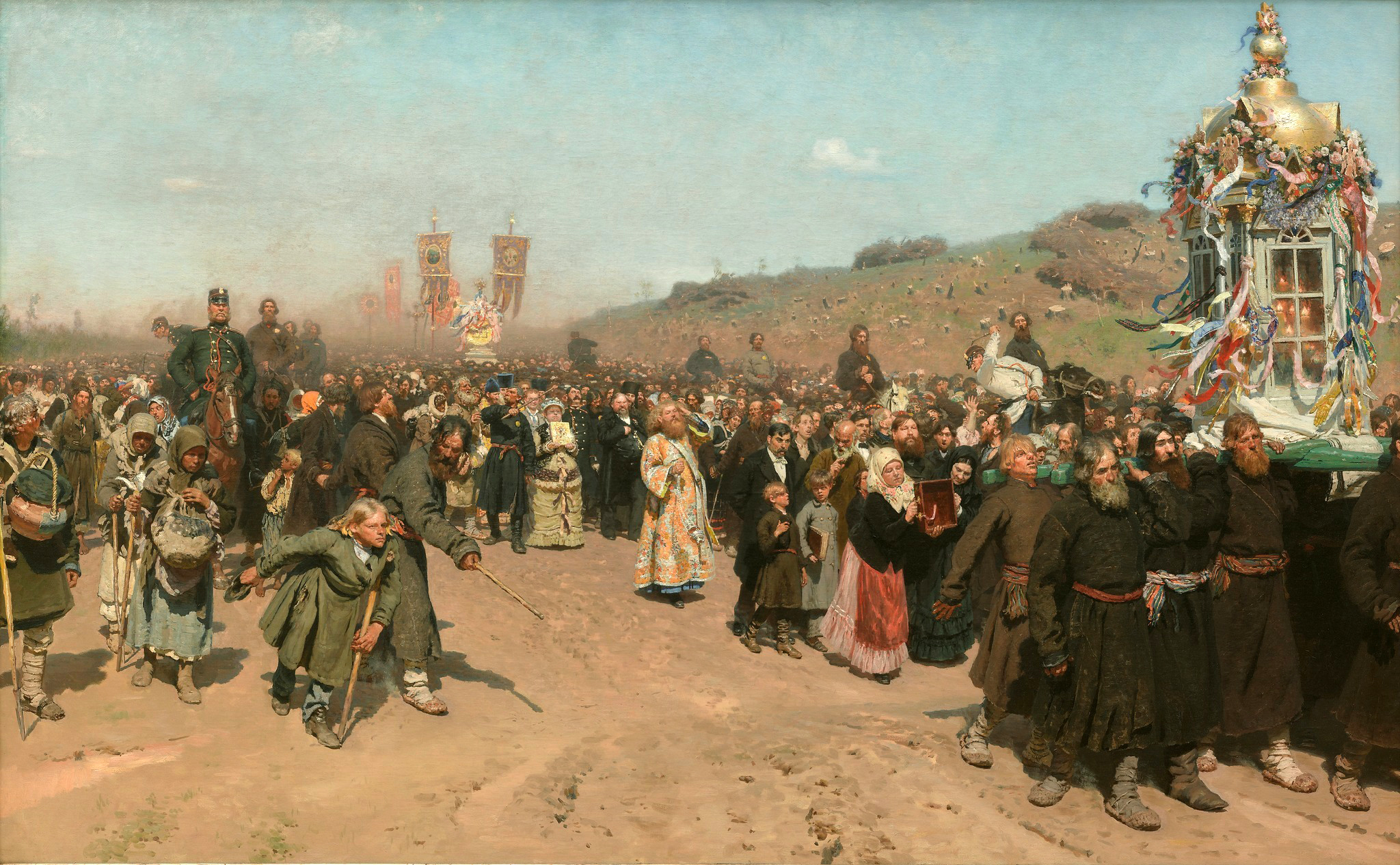
Easter Cross Procession, with khorugvi seen in the background, center (1880-83, Ilya Repin).

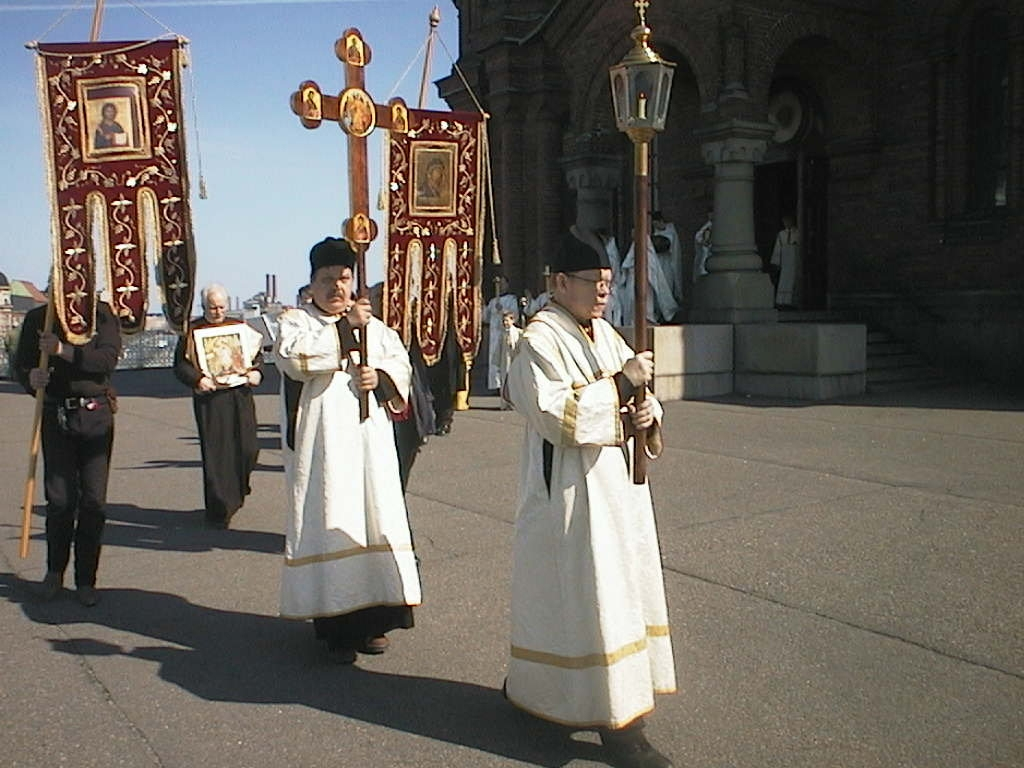
Russian Orthodox Crucession with lantern, processional cross and banners.

The first ensign used by the Christian Church was the labarum of the Roman Emperor Saint Constantine I. In the year 312, on the eve of the Battle of the Milvian Bridge, he saw a vision of the Cross of Christ appear in the sky, and beneath it the words Ἐν τούτῳ νίκα (En touto nika, "In this, be victorious"). Constantine ordered the symbol of the Cross to be placed on the imperial standards. He was victorious in the battle, and as a result legalized the practice of Christianity in the empire, and was himself baptized before his death.

Constantine's victory was seen by Christians not only as a military victory, but as a victory of Christ over those who would persecute the new faith. After this point, we begin to see in Christian art the Greek letters IC (Jesus) XC (Christ) NIKA ("is victorious, conquers") added to depictions of the cross. The meaning is that, through the cross, Jesus Christ is victorious over sin and death. It was an ancient custom for emblems of victory to be placed in temples. Thus, after the legalization of Christianity, banners began to be placed in Christian churches.

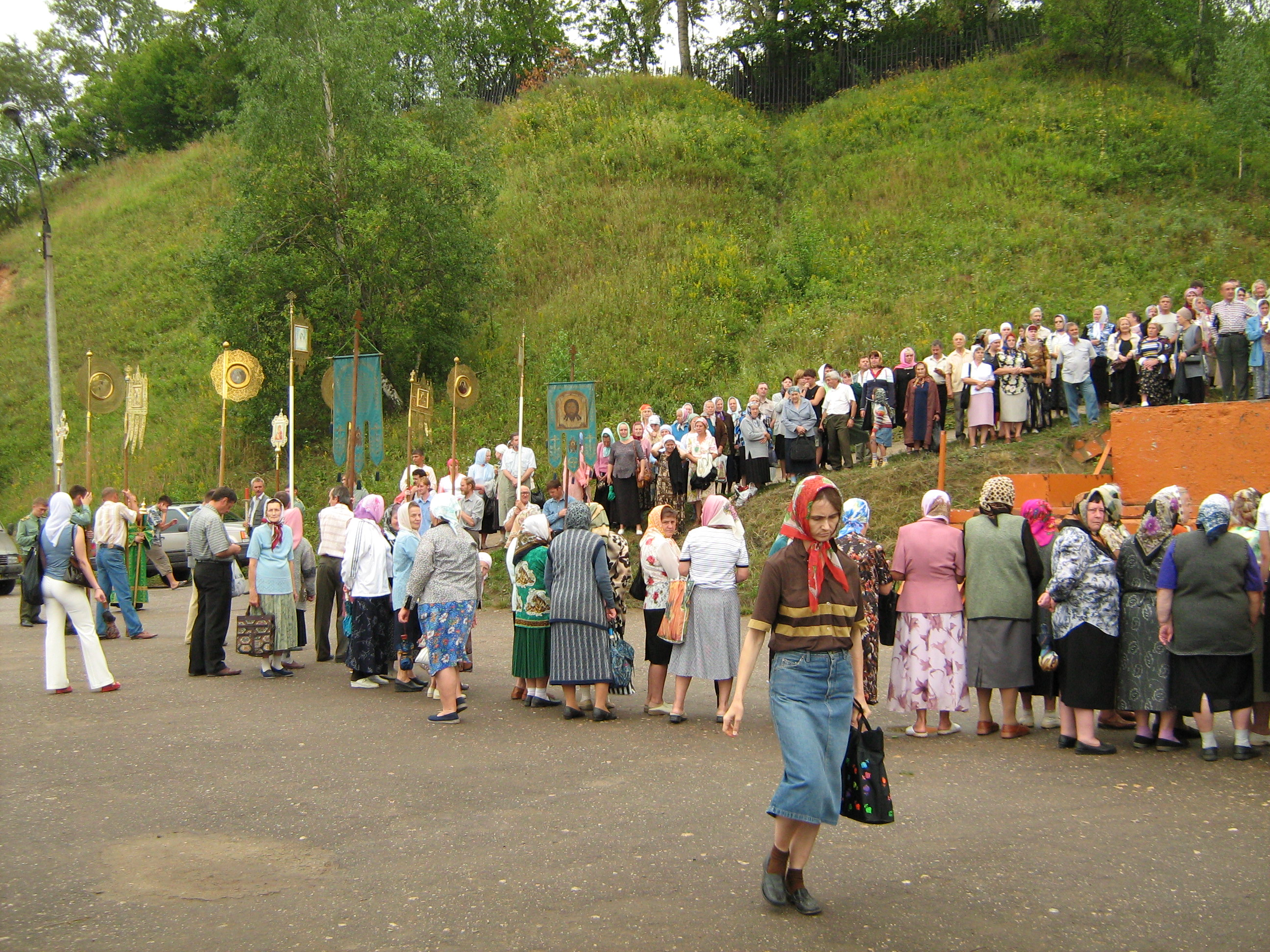
The faithful with khorugvi are waiting for the arrival of the relics of Venerable Macarius to Kstovo.

During the time of the Byzantine Empire, embroidery developed a great deal, thanks to contact with the orient and the introduction of silk. Artists often copied from Persian models and enhanced their work with pearls and with gold and silver threads. In the Byzantine Empire and other Orthodox lands (Bulgaria, Serbia, Imperial Russia, etc.), fine needlework studios developed, which produced exquisite banners, some of which today are displayed in museums around the world. Spain and Italy were equally influenced by Byzantine tastes, and by the Middle Ages, the use of richly embroidered church banners is attested in both the East and the West.

== Liturgical use ==
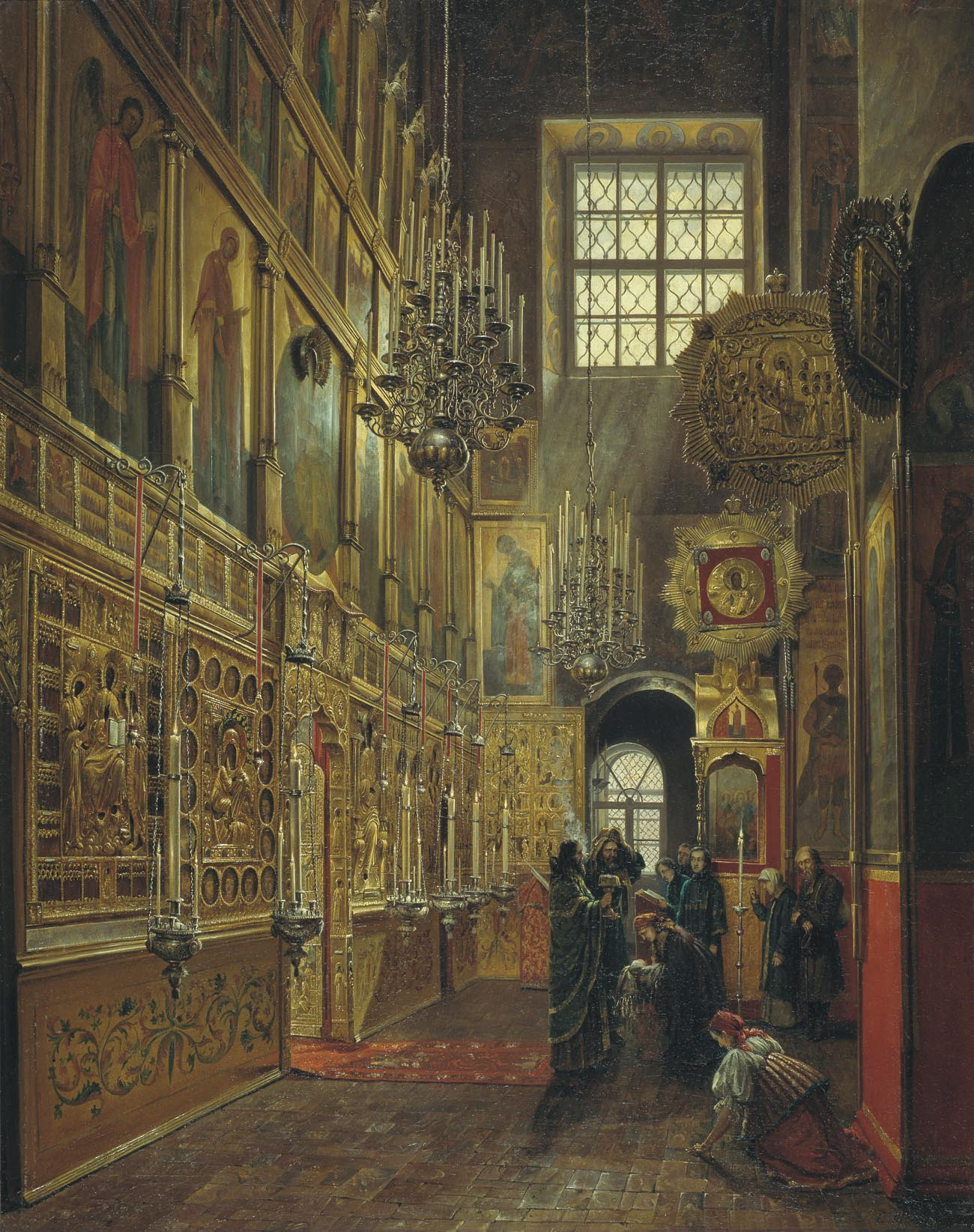
Receiving Holy Communion at Chudov Monastery, Moscow. Metalwork khorugvi can be seen on the right (1866, Stepan Shukhvostov).

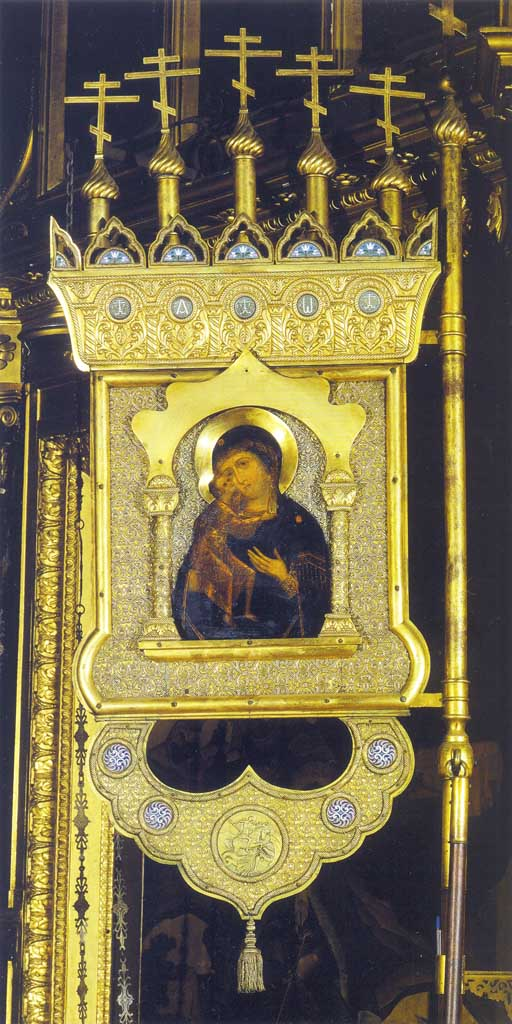
Metallic khorugv, Theotokos of St. Theodore, Moscow (1916).

Since these banners are intended for religious use and not secular, they are normally blessed when first brought into the church. The priest says a prayer and sprinkles the banner with holy water, after which the banner is placed in its stand by the Iconostasis.

To either side of the Iconostasis is a kliros, from which the singers chant the service. A banner is usually mounted at each kliros. The banner on the right (south) side often has a mandylion on it; the one on the left (north), an icon of the Theotokos. There may be more banners as well: banners of Saint Nicholas and the Patron Saint of the church or monastery are very common. The two choirs (klirosi) symbolize the ranks of the Church Militant, and the banners represent the victorious triumph of Christ over the world, sin and the devil.

The banners are used in all church processions, except the procession on Great Saturday, when the Epitaphios is carried. The khorugv usually comes in line right after the Cross in processions, representing triumphant banners leading the faithful in their pilgrimage to the kingdom of heaven. On Good Friday and Great Saturday, the khorugv have black cloth tied around their borders, indicating mourning over the death of Christ. At Pascha (Easter) these black borders are replaced by white ones bearing the triumphal words: "Christ is Risen!"

There is also a special paschal banner in the form of an icon of the Resurrection mounted on a pole. Sometimes the background of the icon is cut away, and a wreath of flowers surrounds the whole.

== See also ==
- Labarum
- Gonfalon
- Crucession
