= Flagellant confraternities =

Central Italian flagellant confraternities
- Formation: 10th century
- Type: Religious confraternity
- Region: Central Italy
- Language: Latin, Italian
- Purpose: Religious devotion, acts of mercy

Central Italian flagellant confraternities evolved and emerged from Central Italian confraternities that originated in the tenth century. The members of these original confraternities were lay persons (usually men, but sometimes women) who were devoted to religious life.

These groups promoted religious life but were independent of the church and offered an alternative form of service for those church members who did not want to commit themselves to the strict behaviors of monastic or convent life. Members of confraternities were usually wealthy citizens, with high profiles in the society, who assisted with religious rites by making financial donations and by reciting Masses.

Some confraternities were guided by the acts of mercy based on the New Testament parable The Sheep and the Goats. From this parable, the church had drawn Seven Acts of Corporal Mercy.

In the present-day, these are known as confraternities of penitents.

== Social aspects of confraternity participation in the community ==
Although their original reason for being was to help their members achieve personal salvation, the Central Italian confraternities became increasingly social and political during their formative centuries (particularly the twelfth and thirteenth centuries). Some of these confraternities became powerful social influences as well in their communities. Often confraternity members began the work on their personal salvation by donating food and other alms to the poor; but in many central Italian cities, like Bergamo, the confraternities became so involved in the community that they provided dowries for young women, ransomed soldiers held captive by enemy governments, and provided restitution to victims of disasters and crime. This social benevolence, however, was not the focus of all of these confraternities. During the 13th century, confraternities were also founded, which emphasized instead the need for personal mortification of the flesh as a way to salvation.

== Types of confraternities ==
The Central Italian confraternities became identified as one of two types. The first type of confraternity, called laudesi, processed through their towns singing songs in praise of God; the second kind of confraternity, known as battuti or disciplinati, flagellated themselves during somber public processions. With the advent of this second type of confraternity, flagellation became commonly associated with the Central Italian confraternities of the later Middle Ages.

== Flagellation practices in the confraternities ==
Flagellation in these confraternities developed an even stronger tradition in the fourteenth century with the pandemic of the Plague or Black Death. Christian religious groups often expressed the belief that the plague was the wrath of an angry God, who was punishing his followers. In an effort to appease God, lay religious groups advocated punishing their own flesh to show God how they regretted their personal failures.

== Depictions of flagellation in confraternal art ==
These battuti or disciplinati confraternities used artists to help dramatize their belief in the importance of flagellation. The gonfalon, or banner carried by the confraternities during their processions, often depicted this concept. Laura Fenley describes the impact of these gonfaloni and their message to the communities of worshippers:

One typical plague gonfalone is Benedetto Bonfigli’s painting of 1464, now in the church of San Francesco at Prato in Perugia, which likens the plague to arrows thrown down at a sinful humanity by an angry God. The massive figure of the merciful Virgin protectively envelops the citizens of Perugia with her outstretched mantle while the image of Death below claims the lives of those outside the city walls.

Seven years later, Bonfigli was commissioned by the flagellant confraternity of San Benedetto dia Frustati to paint a second banner when the city was free of disease. This second painting, called the Gonfalone di S. Maria Nuova, had two major purposes. The 11-foot-tall (3.4 m) painting was carried by the flagellants during ‘crisis processionals’ whenever the city was threatened by drought, flood, siege, or pestilence. In addition, this gonfalone promoted the flagellant confraternity, which was in rivalry with the city’s other confraternities. As Fenley explains, the painting portrays "Christ brandishing arrows and pointing to his own wounds in reminder of the constant threat of the plague, crisis, and the eternal judgment." Flagellant confraternities like this one frequently reminded their citizens of the flagellation of Jesus in order to promote and strengthen their own devotion to flagellation.

== Impact of the Black Death on the practice of flagellation ==
With the plague as a reality in their daily life, the populations of these Central Italian cities were no strangers to fear and to the horror of the Black Death. Depictions of the wrath of God and the sacrifice of Jesus in the processional gonfaloni heightened their urgency to find ways to appease God and their own guilt. The confraternity flagellations provided a real and dramatic sense of atonement. Thus, the plague aided in institutionalizing flagellation as part of personal devotion to God.

== Eventual absorption of confraternities into political structure of the Signori ==
The confraternities were instrumental in providing a smooth transition from communal government to the signoria political structure in the 15th century. As the confraternities became absorbed into the social and political structure of the signoria and as the plague disappeared, the driving forces that promoted flagellation also faded away. While personal mortification of the flesh remained an acknowledged choice of personal worship in the Roman Catholic Church, public flagellation was no longer promoted, nor a common public display, by the time of the Renaissance.
