= Orthodox Christian Laity =

The Orthodox Christian Laity (OCL) is an independently organized movement of Orthodox Christian laity and clergy who are "involved with Orthodox Renewal in the Americas."

The organization has EIN 36-3618846 as a 501(c)(3) Public Charity; in 2024 it claimed $125,931 in total revenue and $442,989 in total assets. Its registered mission/description is "an independent, national, Pan-Orthodox, 501(c)3 non-profit, educational association, incorporated in the State of Illinois on March 17, 1988, for the purpose of advancing the renewal of the Orthodox Christian Church in the United States by: advocating that the laity remain part of the conciliar governance process which provides balance to the hierarchy and clergy, all working together in governance, spiritual and other matters to ensure accountability and transparency in the affairs of the Church. OCL is committed to the establishment of an administratively and canonically unified, self-governing Orthodox Church in the United States."

The organization's patron saints are Ss. Photini the Samaritan woman and Symeon the New Theologian.

== See also ==
- Autonomy
- Autocephaly
