= Confraternity =

Christian voluntary association

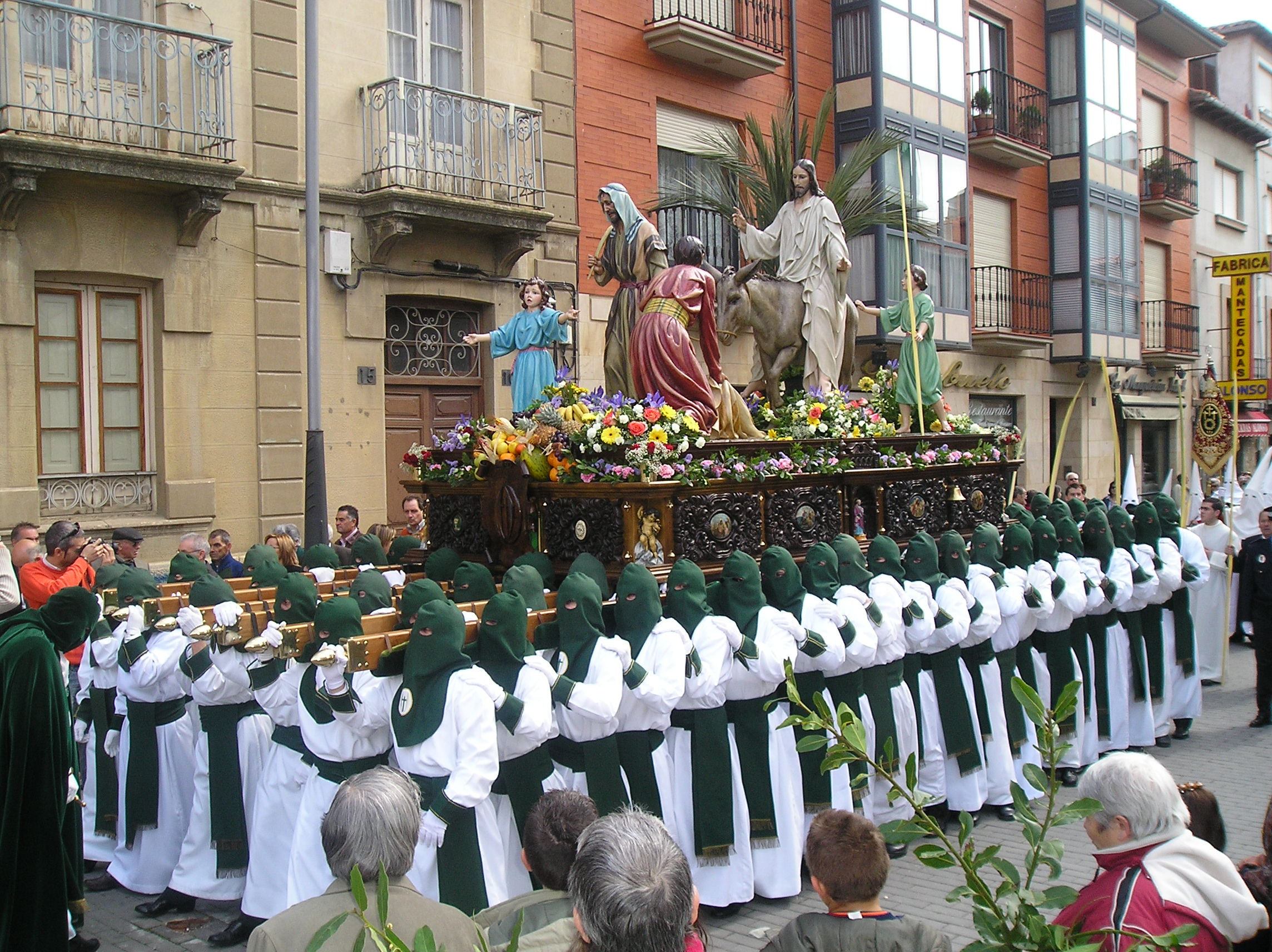
Members of a confraternity of penitents leading a Lent procession in Spain.

A confraternity (Spanish: cofradía; Portuguese: confraria) is generally a Christian voluntary association of laypeople created for the purpose of promoting special works of Christian charity or piety, and approved by the Church hierarchy. They are most common among Catholics, Lutherans, Anglicans, and the Western Orthodox. When a Catholic confraternity has received the authority to aggregate to itself groups erected in other localities, it is called an archconfraternity. Examples include the various confraternities of penitents and the confraternities of the cord, as well as the Confraternity of the Holy Guardian Angels and the Confraternity of the Rosary.

Confraternities were "the most sweeping and ubiquitous movement of the central and later Middle Ages".

== History ==
Pious associations of laymen existed in very ancient times at Constantinople and Alexandria. In France, in the eighth and ninth centuries, the laws of the Carolingians mention confraternities and guilds. But the first confraternity in the modern and proper sense of the word is said to have been founded at Paris by Bishop Odo (d. 1208). It was under the invocation of the Blessed Virgin Mary.

Confraternities had their beginnings in the early Middle Ages, and developed rapidly from the end of the twelfth century. The main object and duty of these societies were, above all, the practice of piety and works of charity.

Some confraternities were very widely spread, especially in the cities of the Middle Ages. According to historian Konrad Eisenbichler, "After the State and the Church, the most well-organised membership system of medieval and early modern Europe was the confraternity—an association of lay persons who gathered regularly to pray and carry out a charitable activity. In cities, towns, and villages it would have been difficult for someone not to be a member of a confraternity, a benefactor of a confraternity’s charitable work, or, at the very least, not to be aware of a confraternity’s presence in the community."

Confraternities could be important and wealthy institutions for the elite, as in for example, the Scuole Grandi of Venice. The Purgatorial societies and orders of flagellants were other specialized medieval types. The medieval French term puy designated a confraternity dedicated to artistic performance in music, song and poetry; the German meistersingers were similar, though typically imitating craft guilds in form. Starting in the fourteenth century, northern France saw the rise of confraternities and other lay communities of men and women, organized around trades and religious devotions dedicated to specific patron saints.

Various other congregations such as of the Holy Trinity, of the Scapular, etc., were founded between the thirteenth and sixteenth centuries. From the latter century onwards, these pious associations have multiplied greatly. The Archconfraternity of the Gonfalone was headquartered in the Church of Santa Lucia del Gonfalone. Because of their white hooded robes, they were identified as the "White Penitents". They were established in 1264 at Rome. St. Bonaventure, at that time Inquisitor-general of the Holy Office, prescribed the rules, and the white habit, with the name Recommendati B. V.

In medieval England confraternities were often called religious guilds, or just guilds, and were suppressed by Edward VI.

Confraternities were present, too, in Spanish America and played a large role in the religious organization of the Colonial Era.

== Membership ==
Each Confraternity organization has a set of rules or by-laws to follow which every member promises to live by. Even though the Catholic Church works in harmony with the confraternity, these rules are not religious vows, instead merely rules set up to govern the confraternal organization. Some confraternities allow only men, while others allow only women or only youth.

== Activities ==
The religiosity of the members and their desire for a personal reward in the afterlife were reflected in confraternity activities, such as assisting with burials by donating burial robes or monetary payment, attending the burial mass, volunteering in the local hospitals, organization of and participation in religious feast days, giving dowries for local orphans, selling and preparing bread used for local religious holidays, escorting the condemned during the inquisition, burying the dead during epidemics and other charitable acts as deemed appropriate by the confraternity members or parish priest. Society could not function strictly through government programs because there was also a need to take care of matters such as burials, and provide for the poor and indigent. While governments maintained programs to handle these needs, they were better managed by lay organizations or the "neighbor helping neighbor" theory.

== Examples ==
The term may have other meanings: The Confraternity of the Immaculate Conception is a renowned lay Marian apostolate in the Philippines known for administering the Grand Marian Procession parade on the Feast of the Immaculate Conception.

The Confraternity of the Blessed Sacrament is an example of an Anglo-Catholic confraternity established in the Church of England which has spread to many places within the Anglican Communion of churches.

Members of The Augustana Confraternity, which is in the Lutheran tradition, "devote themselves to the teachings of Holy Scripture and to the elucidation of those teachings in the Confessional writings of the Lutheran Church, particularly the Small Catechism."

On October 23, 2025, King Charles III was given the title Royal Confrater of the Papal Basilica of Saint Paul Outside the Walls during a state visit to the Vatican. Then, King Charles III established Pope Leo XIV as Papal Confrater of St. George's Chapel in Windsor Castle.

== See also ==
- Orthodox Christian Laity
- Brotherhoods (confraternities)
- Confraternities of the Cord
- Confraternity of the Divine Infant of Prague
