= Flagellation =

Whipping as a punishment

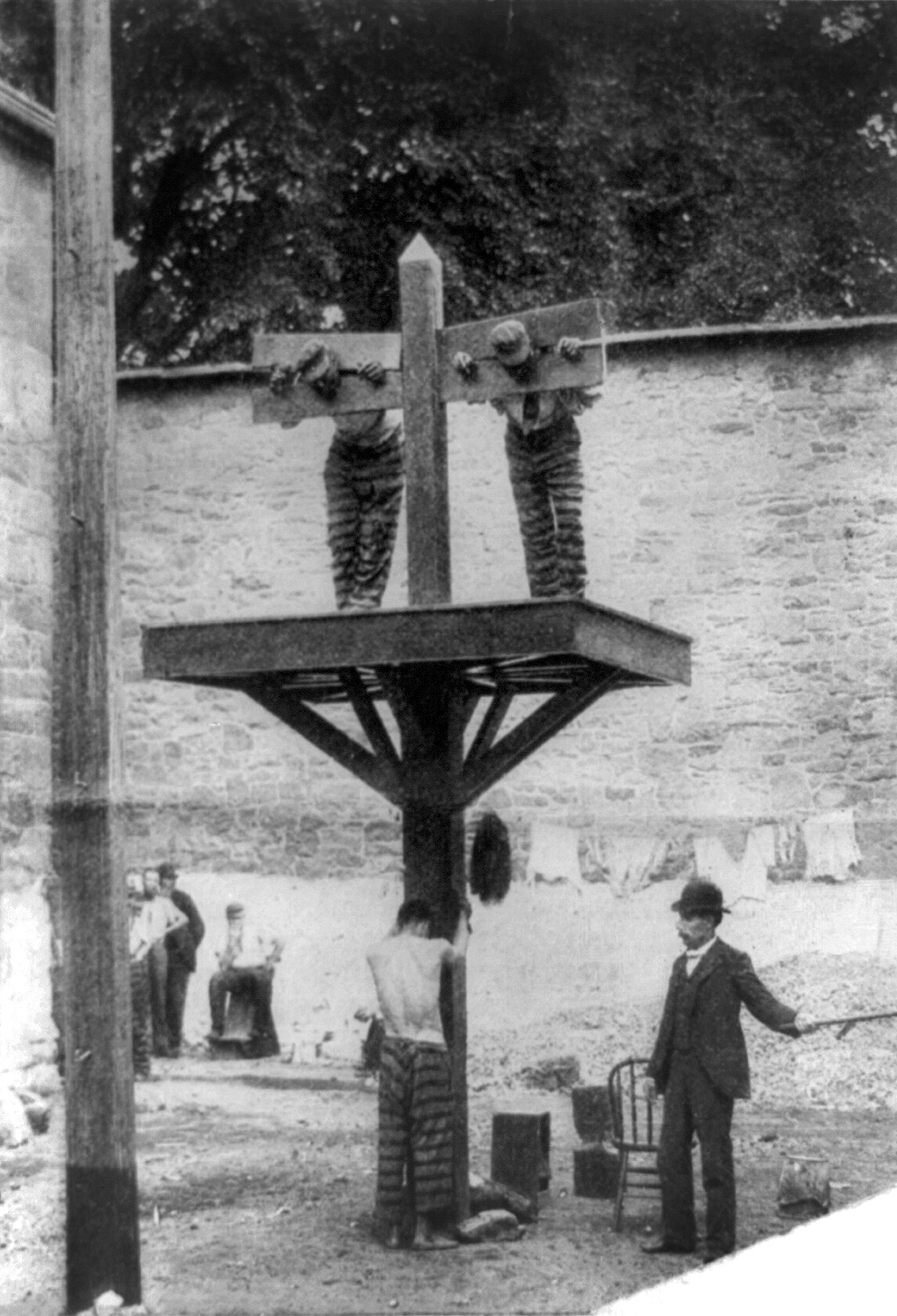
Prisoners at a whipping post in a Delaware prison, c. 1907

Flagellation (Latin flagellum, 'whip'), flogging or whipping is the act of beating the human body with special implements such as whips, rods, switches, the cat o' nine tails, the sjambok, the knout, etc. Typically, flogging has been imposed on an unwilling subject as a punishment; however, it can also be submitted to willingly and even done by oneself in sadomasochistic or religious contexts.

The strokes are typically aimed at the unclothed back of a person, though they can be administered to other areas of the body. For a moderated subform of flagellation, described as bastinado, the soles of a person's bare feet are used as a target for beating (see foot whipping).

In some circumstances the word flogging is used loosely to include any sort of corporal punishment, including birching and caning. However, in British legal terminology, a distinction was drawn between flogging (with a cat o' nine tails) and whipping (formerly with a whip, but since the early 19th century with a birch). In Britain these were both abolished in 1948.

== Terminology and implements ==
The terms "flogging", "whipping" and "scourging" are sometimes used interchangeably but can denote specific tools or contexts. Common implements include:

| Implement | Description |
|---|---|
| Birch rod | A bundle of birch twigs bound together, used in British judicial and school punishments. |
| Cat o' nine tails | A multi‑corded whip traditionally used in naval and military punishments. |
| Knout | A stiff, braided leather whip used in Imperial Russia. |
| Sjambok | A heavy leather or plastic whip originating from Southern Africa. |
| Switch | A single flexible twig or branch, often used informally or for minor corporal punishment. |

== Current or recent past use as punishment ==
Officially abolished in most countries, flogging or whipping, including foot whipping in some countries, is still a common punishment in some parts of the world, particularly in countries using Islamic law and in some territories which were former British colonies.

=== Singapore and Malaysia ===
Caning may be ordered by the courts as a penalty for some categories of crime in Singapore and Malaysia, as a legacy of British colonial rule in the 19th Century. Unlike typical floggings sentenced by Sharia courts which are public, these punishments take place behind closed doors, with the accused tied to specially constructed frames and carried out with a doctor in attendance.

- As of 2024 in Singapore, caning and imprisonment is mandated for approximately 30 different offenses, including certain cases of rape, robbery, and drug trafficking.
- In Malaysia, 60 offenses during 2024 were subject to caning. Judges routinely mandated caning as punishment for crimes such as kidnapping, rape, and robbery, but also nonviolent offenses -- narcotics possession, criminal breach of trust, migrant smuggling, immigration offenses, etc.
- On 5 September 2023, Tanzania was ordered to remove corporal punishment from its laws by the African Court on Human and Peoples' Rights, in order to bring those laws in line with the charter establishing the court.

=== Maldives ===
In the Maldives, Sharia law is mixed with English common law, flogging (but not stoning or amputation) is legal punishment, most commonly used on those convicted of having extramarital sex, who are most commonly women. The object used to lash is typically a paddle, but a "less harsh" tool -- peacock feathers, handkerchief, or "a single lash with a string of 100 rosary beads, each bead counting as a separate lash" -- may be substituted when the offender being lashed has more political influence.

=== Gulf states ===
According to journalist Robert Fisk, from circa 1993-1995, "hundreds" of Asian young women guest workers in Saudi Arabia and the United Arab Emirates were sentenced to flogging (as many as 200 lashes) by sharia courts before being expelled "penniless" to their home countries for alleged theft or "supposed immoral behaviour". The US State Department Human Rights Practices Report for 2021 states that flogging under the UAE federal penal code was abolished, but is still imposed under the UAE's separate sharia courts, which deal with criminal and family law cases, for adultery, defamation of character, and drug or alcohol use. (The next year, the 2022 report did not mention Corporal Punishment in the UAE at all.)

==== Kingdom of Saudi Arabia ====
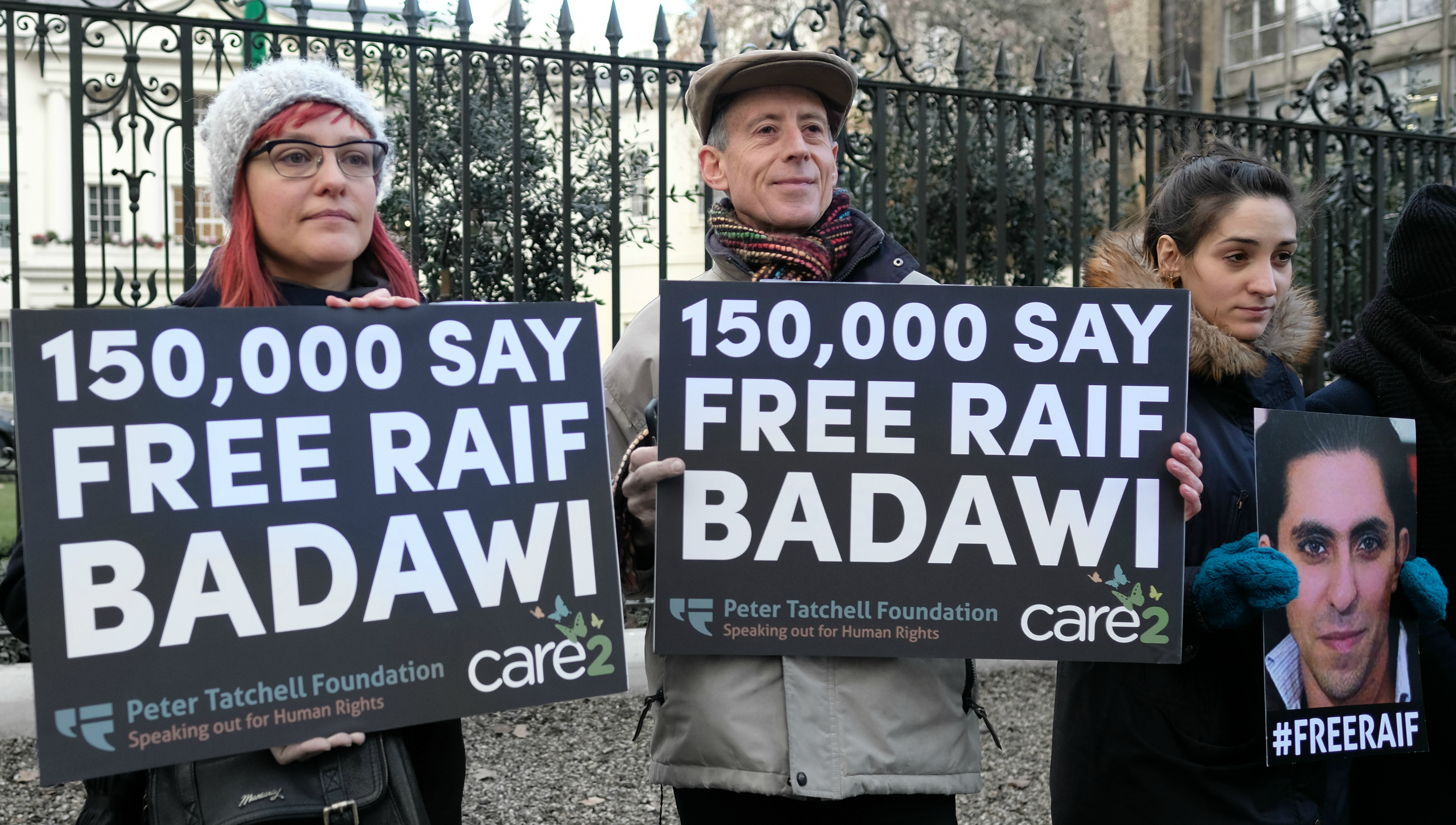
Protesters in London demonstrating against detention and flogging of Raif Badawi

In Saudi Arabia, lashing is the prescribed punishment (hadd) for offences such as homosexuality, fornication, adultery, drinking of alcohol, theft, and slander. Lashing is also used as a discretionary punishment (ta'zir) for many offences, such as violating gender interaction laws. Possibly the most famous contemporary case of lashing is that of Raif Badawi, a Saudi blogger who was sentenced a number of times from 2012–2014 to 1,000 lashes and 10 years in prison for "insulting Islam" online. In April 2020 the Supreme Court of Saudi Arabia abolished flogging as a form of punishment, but as of 2024 a draft of the government's proposed written legal code leaked to the public included lashing as punishment.

=== Islamic Republic of Iran ===
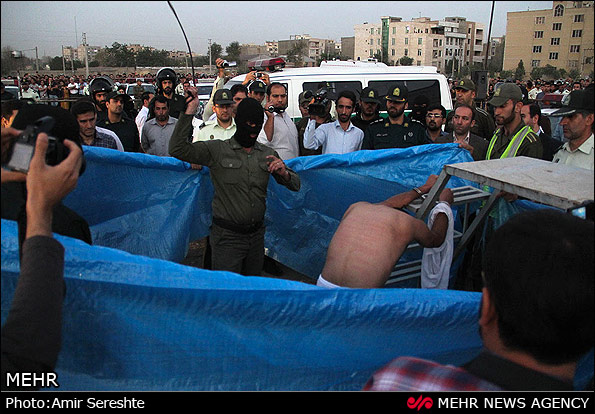
Flagellation in Iran

According to the Abdorrahman Boroumand Center, over a 30+ year period, courts in the IRI have sentenced "thousands" of individuals to flogging, "sometimes up to more than 300 or 400 lashes". There are "at least" 148 offenses punishable by flogging in the Islamic Republic. In addition to Sharia hudood punishments for alcohol use, fornication, etc., flogging is also used in the interrogation of detainees. In June 2026, Parastoo Ahmadi and eight other members of the group that were involved in the Caravanserai Concert were convicted of "public decency through the production and publication of obscene and immoral content" and were sentenced by a criminal court to 74 lashes, based on the release of a video that showed Ahmadi performing while not wearing a hijab.

=== Afghanistan ===
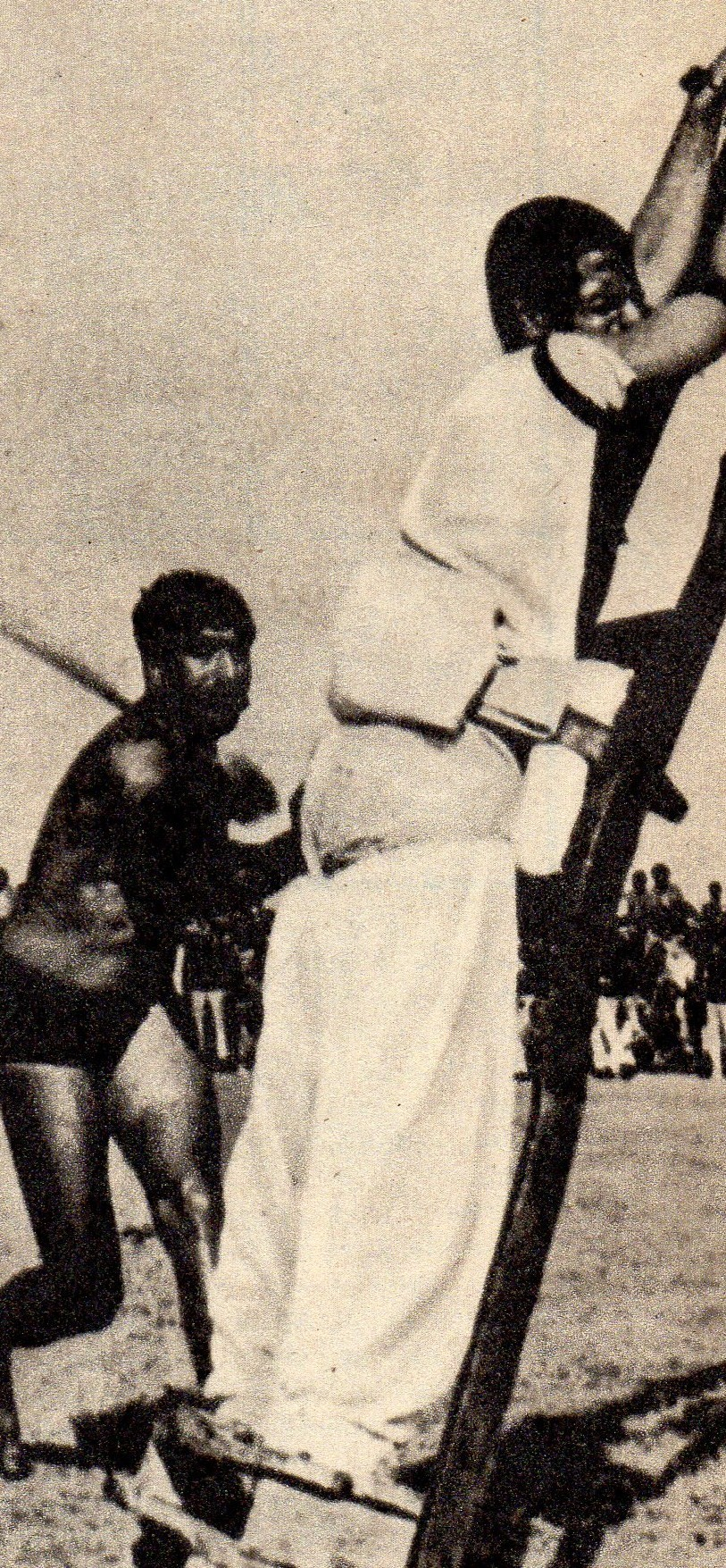
Flogging of a man sexual offence in Islamabad, Pakistan (late 1970s)

After the Taliban recaptured Afghanistan in 2021, they announced reintroduction of Islamic law including public flogging, denouncing international human rights activists who criticized the practice. On 23 November 2022, 14 convicts were flogged in a sports stadium in the province of Logar while hundreds of people watched.

=== Pakistan ===
In 1979 Hudud Ordinances were enacted in Pakistan as part of the Islamization of Pakistan by Muhammad Zia-ul-Haq, (Hudud punishments are part of sharia). It adding new criminal offences and new punishments including whipping, (as well as amputation, and stoning to death).

In 1996 the Abolition of Whipping Act was passed, allowing only hadd sentences/punishments to be whipping/lashing, which "greatly reduced" its use. In 2006, after much controversy and criticism parts of the Hudud law was extensively revised by the Women's Protection Bill making it less difficult and dangerous to prove an allegation of rape.

=== Indonesia ===
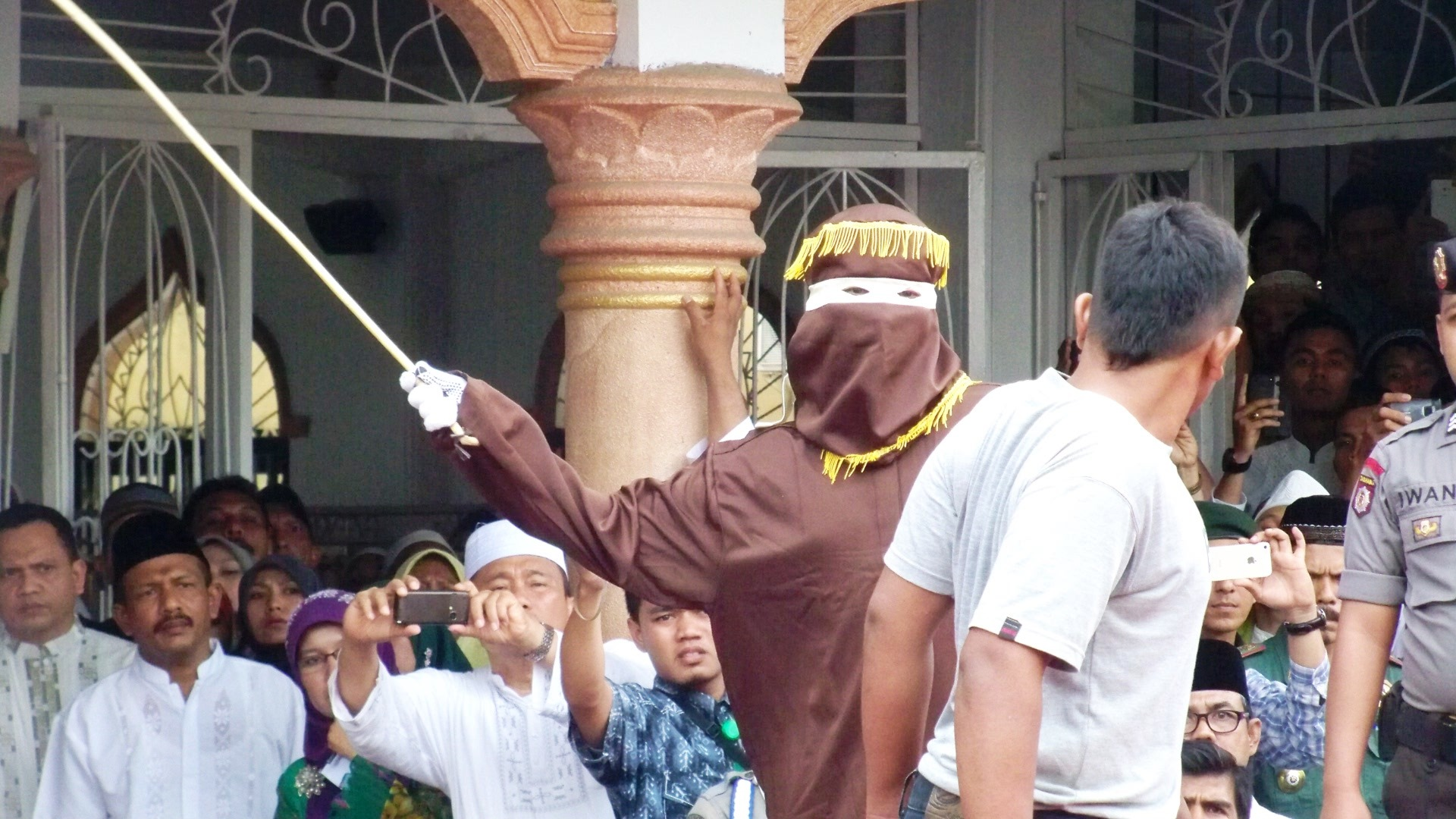
A convict receiving a caning sentence in Banda Aceh under sharia, 19 September 2014

In the religiously conservative province of Aceh (the only area of Indonesia that enforces Sharia law), women offenders are flogged by other women to avoid mixing of the sexes. 108 people were punished for various offences in 2015, according to Amnesty International. According to the U.S. Department of State Country Reports on Human Rights Practices, from January to October 2024, there were five cases of caning punishments reported in Aceh. In one case in September 2024 nine individuals received seven lashes for online gambling (as well as 39 days in prison).

=== Brunei ===
As of 2024, Brunei has a Sharia Penal Code (SPC) which applies caning for sharia offenses. There are also offenses under secular law punished by caning. Canings are prohibited for women and males under 8 or over 50, or if the doctor (who must attend any caning) calls for the caning to be interrupted for medical reasons. In 2024, no canings were administered in Brunei.

=== Syria ===
In Syria, torture of political dissidents, POWs and civilians was extremely common during the reign of Hafez and Bashar Al-Assad (1971-2024), and flagellation was one of the most common forms of torture. The extremist Islamist group ISIS also frequently used flagellation, commonly tying a prisoner to a ceiling and whipping them for failing to follow ISIS's strict laws or for other reasons. Raqqa Stadium, a makeshift prison, was a common venue for prisoners of ISIS to be tortured. Flagellation was also used by the more moderate opposition Free Syrian Army, but there were no reports of it being practiced by the Syrian Democratic Forces.

== Historical use as punishment ==
=== Judaism ===
According to the Torah (Deuteronomy 25:1–3), and Rabbinic law, lashes (Malkot) may be given for offenses that do not merit capital punishment. The number of lashes may not exceed 40 strokes. However, in the absence of a Sanhedrin (a legislative or judicial assembly of elders), corporal punishment is not practiced in Jewish law. Halakha specifies the lashes must be given in sets of three, so the total number cannot exceed 39. Also, the person whipped is first judged whether they can withstand the punishment. If not, the number of lashes is decreased. Jewish law (Halakha) limited flagellation to forty strokes, and in practice delivered thirty-nine, so as to avoid any possibility of breaking this law due to a miscount.

=== Antiquity ===
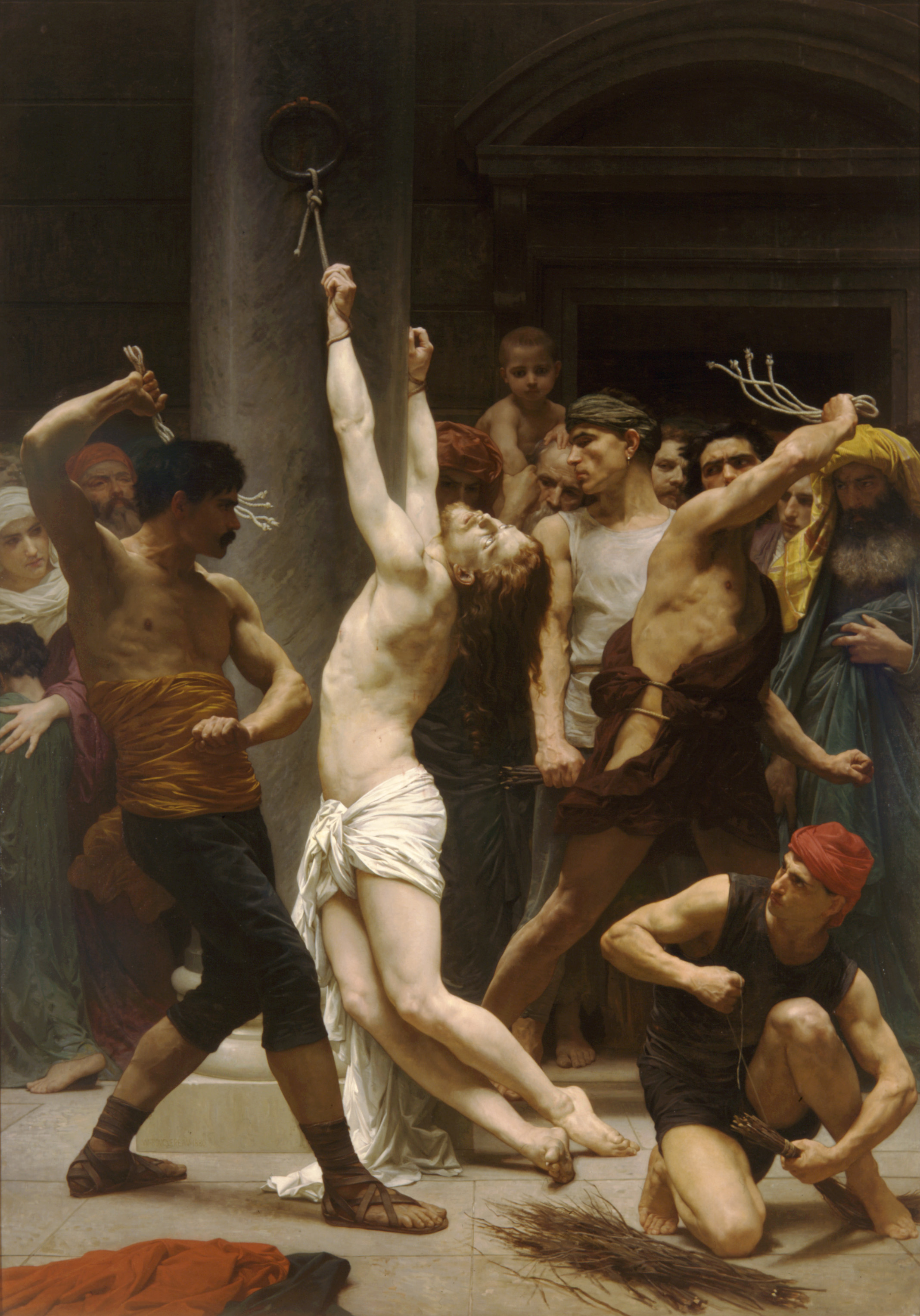
Painting of the flagellation of Jesus which illustrates the pain the punishment causes

In the Roman Empire, flagellation was often used as a prelude to crucifixion, and in this context is sometimes referred to as scourging. Most famously according to the gospel accounts, this occurred prior to the crucifixion of Jesus Christ. Due to the context of the flagellation of Jesus, the method and extent may have been limited by local practice, though it was done under Roman law.

Whips with small pieces of metal or bone at the tips were commonly used. Such a device could easily cause disfigurement and serious trauma, such as ripping pieces of flesh from the body or loss of an eye. In addition to causing severe pain, the victim would approach a state of hypovolemic shock due to loss of blood.

The Romans reserved this treatment for non-citizens, as stated in the lex Porcia and lex Sempronia, dating from 195 and 123 BC. The poet Horace refers to the horribile flagellum (horrible whip) in his Satires. Typically, the one to be punished was stripped naked and bound to a low pillar so that he could bend over it, or chained to an upright pillar so as to be stretched out. Two lictors (some reports indicate scourgings with four or six lictors) alternated blows from the bare shoulders down the body to the soles of the feet. There was no limit to the number of blows inflicted—this was left to the lictors to decide, though they were normally not supposed to kill the victim. Nonetheless, Livy, Suetonius and Josephus report cases of flagellation where victims died while still bound to the post. Flagellation was referred to as "half death" by some authors, as many victims died shortly thereafter. Cicero reports in In Verrem, "pro mortuo sublatus brevi postea mortuus" ("taken away for a dead man, shortly thereafter he was dead").

=== From Middle Ages to modern times ===
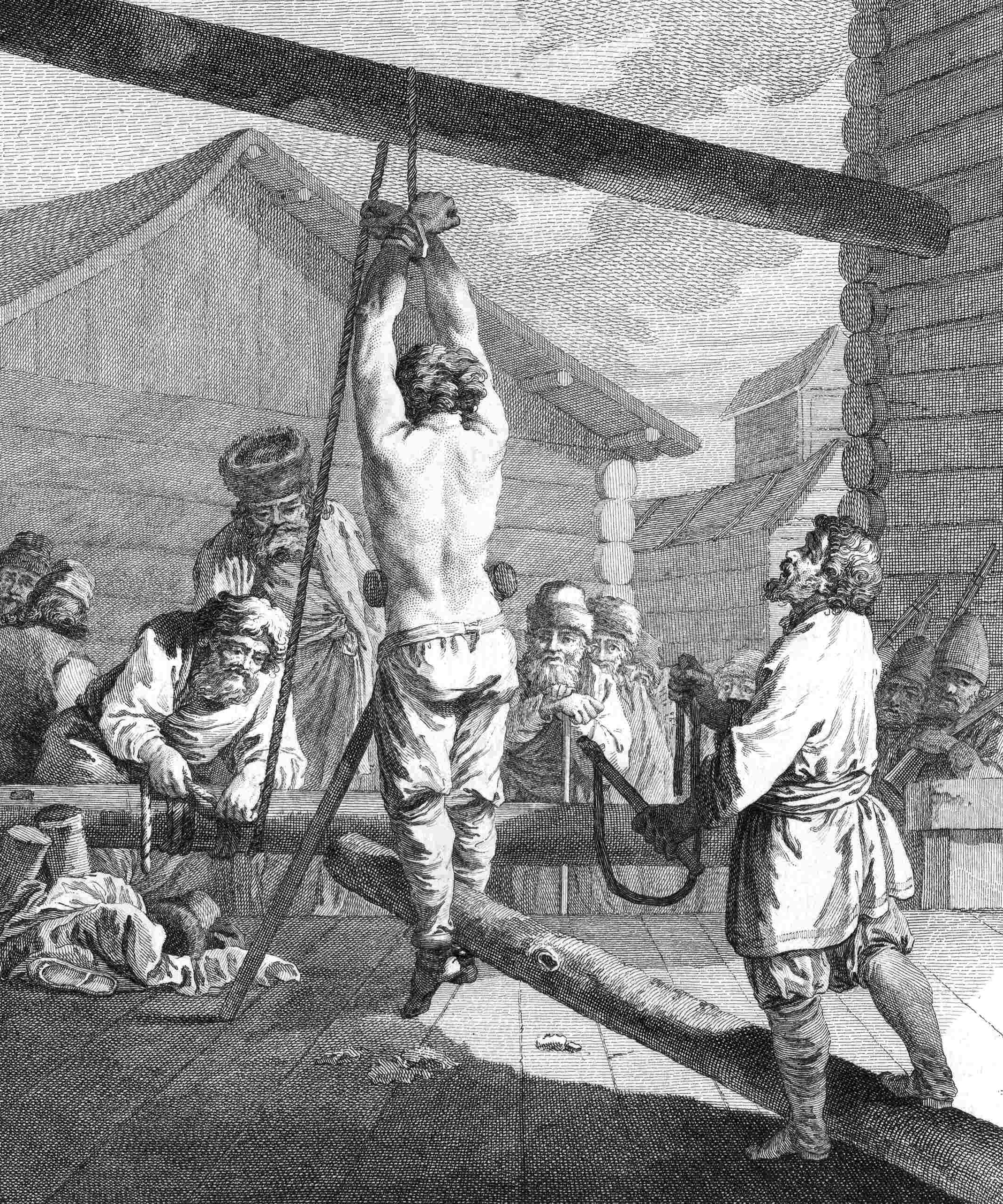
Punishment with a knout (Russia, 18th century)

The Whipping Act was passed in England in 1530. Under this legislation, vagrants were to be taken to a nearby populated area "and there tied to the end of a cart naked and beaten with whips throughout such market town till the body shall be bloody".

In England, offenders (mostly those convicted of theft) were usually sentenced to be flogged "at a cart's tail" along a length of public street, usually near the scene of the crime, "until his [or her] back be bloody". In the late seventeenth century, however, the courts occasionally ordered that the flogging should be carried out in prison or a house of correction rather than on the streets. From the 1720s courts began explicitly to differentiate between private whipping and public whipping. Over the course of the eighteenth and early nineteenth centuries the proportion of whippings carried out in public declined, but the number of private whippings increased. The public whipping of women was abolished in 1817 (after having been in decline since the 1770s) and that of men ended in the early 1830s, though not formally abolished until 1862.

Private whipping of men in prison continued and was not abolished until 1948. The 1948 abolition did not affect the ability of a prison's visiting justices (in England and Wales, but not in Scotland, except at Peterhead) to order the birch or cat for prisoners committing serious assaults on prison staff. This power was not abolished until 1967, having been last used in 1962. School whipping was outlawed in publicly funded schools in 1986, and in privately funded schools in 1998 to 2003.

Whipping occurred during the French Revolution, though not as official punishment. On 31 May 1793, the Jacobin women seized a revolutionary leader, Anne Josephe Theroigne de Mericourt, stripped her naked, and flogged her on the bare bottom in the public garden of the Tuileries. After this humiliation, she refused to wear any clothes, in memory of the outrage she had suffered. She went mad and ended her days in an asylum after the public whipping.

In the Russian Empire, knouts were used to flog criminals and political offenders. Sentences of a hundred lashes would usually result in death. Whipping was used as a punishment for Russian serfs.

Ashraf Fayadh (born 1980), a Saudi Arabian poet, was imprisoned for eight years and lashed 800 times, rather than receiving a death penalty, for apostasy in 2016. In April 2020, Saudi Arabia said it would replace flogging with prison sentences or fines, according to a government document.

=== Use against slaves ===
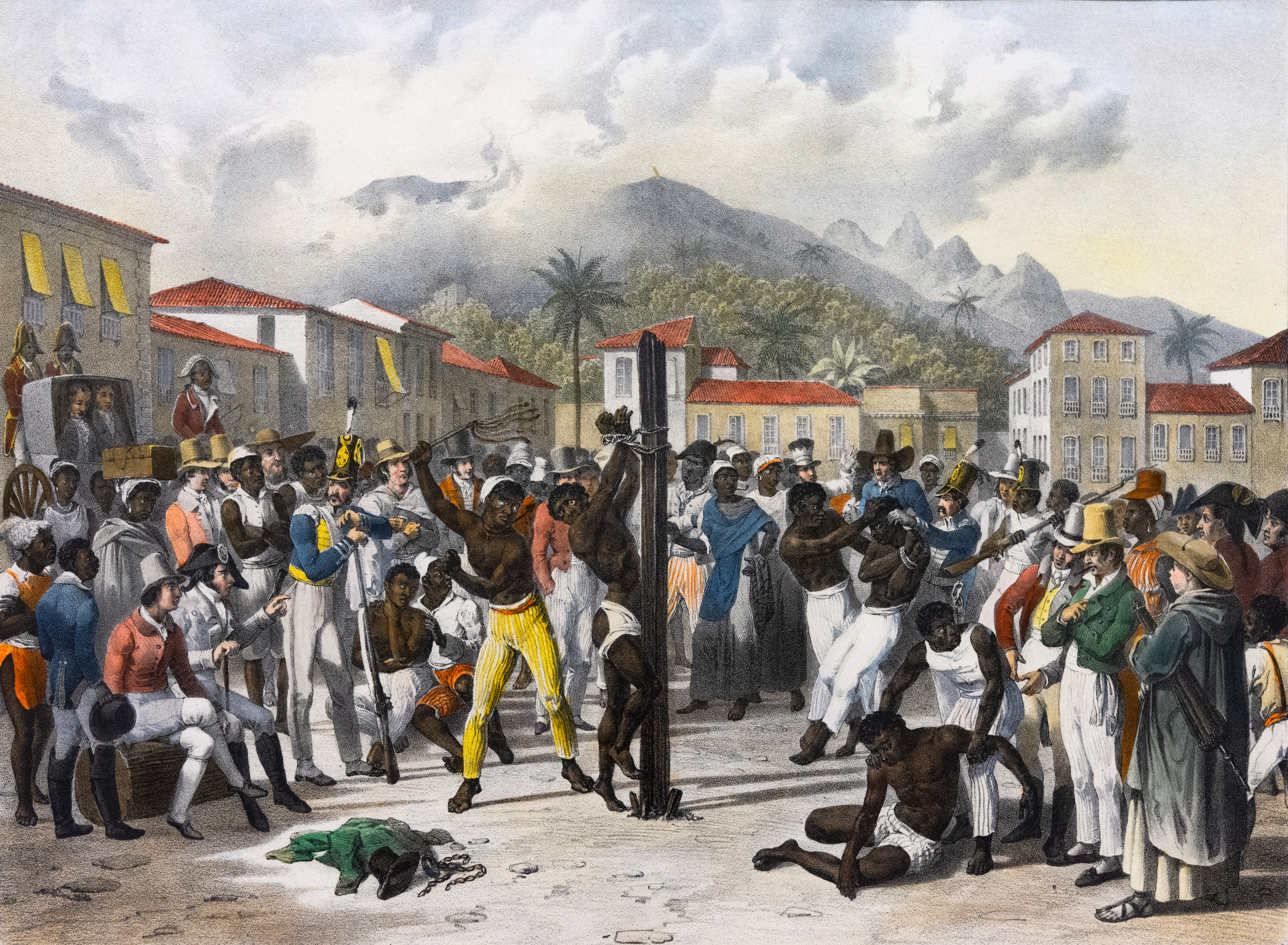
Public flogging of a slave in Brazil – work of German painter Johann Moritz Rugendas (1802–1858)

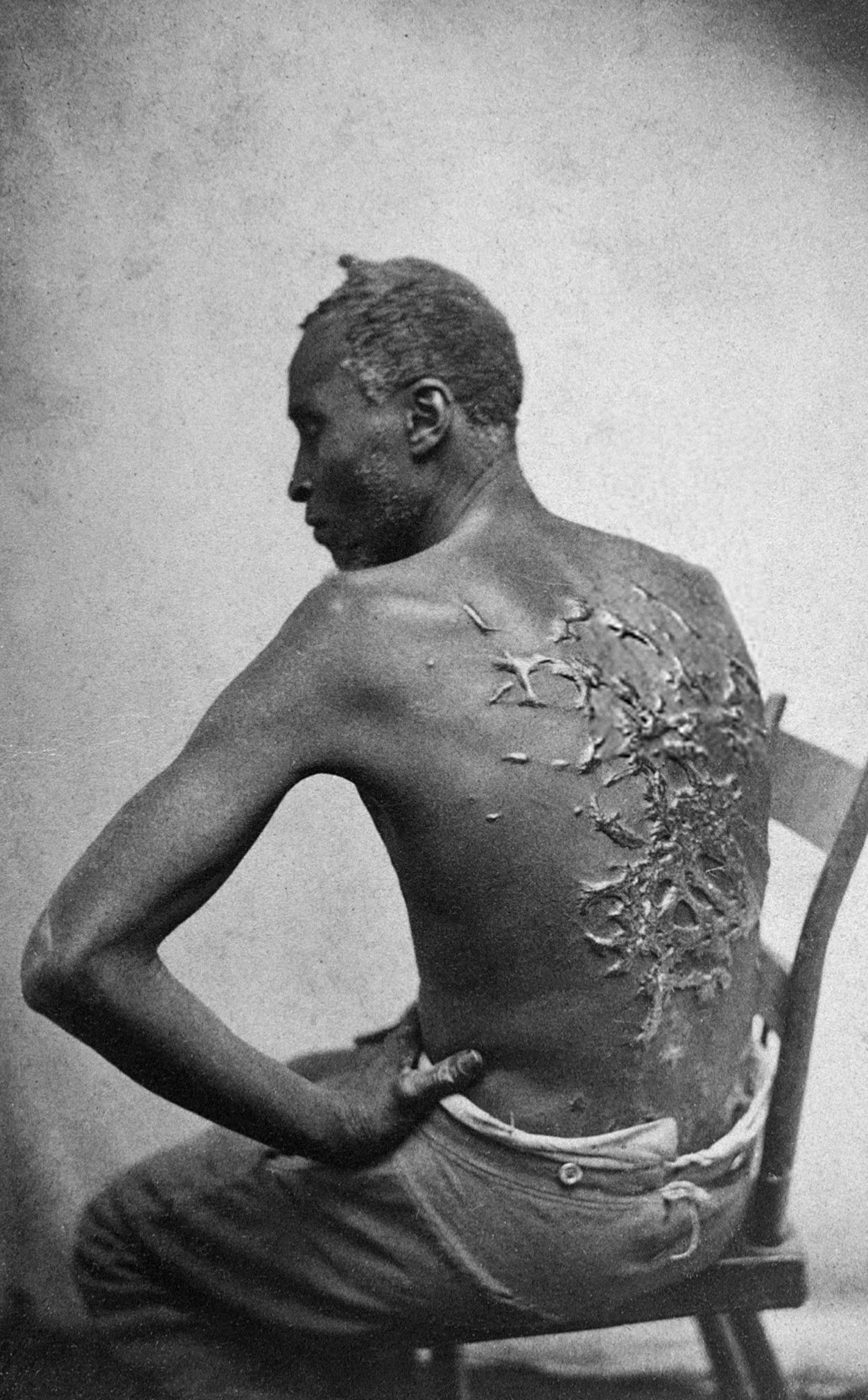
An African-American slave named Peter, photo taken at Baton Rouge, Louisiana, 1863; the scars are clearly visible because of keloid formation

Whipping has been used as a form of discipline on slaves. It was routinely carried out during the period of slavery in the United States, by slave owners to their slaves. The power was also given to slave "patrollers," an early form of police forces who were authorized to whip any slave who violated the slave codes. Historians have shown that President George Washington approved of the whipping of enslaved people. According to historian Michael Dickman, "[Slave-owners] used the whip as a tool to enforce this vision of society. Slaves, on the other hand, through their victimization and punishment, viewed the whip as the physical manifestation of their oppression under slavery." In 1863, a photo known as "Whipped Peter" circulated widely. The photo depicts an enslaved man who bears welts across his back from being whipped. The image sparked outcry against the brutality of slavery, and contributed to anti-slavery sentiment during the Civil War.

=== Flogging as military punishment ===
In the 18th and 19th centuries, European armies administered floggings to common soldiers who committed breaches of the military code.

==== United States ====
During the American Revolutionary War, the American Congress raised the legal limit on lashes from 39 to 100 for soldiers who were convicted by courts-martial.

Prior to 1815 United States Navy captains were given wide discretion in matters of discipline. Surviving ships logs reveal the majority awarded between twelve and twenty-four lashes, depending on the severity of the offense. However, a few such as captain Isaac Chauncey awarded one hundred or more lashes. In 1815, the United States Navy placed a limit on captains of naval vessels so they could award no more than twelve lashes. More severe infractions were to be tried via court martial.

As critics of flogging aboard the ships and vessels of the United States Navy became more vocal, the Department of the Navy began in 1846 to require annual reports of discipline including flogging, and limited the maximum number of lashes to 12. These annual reports were required from the captain of each naval vessel. See thumbnail for the 1847 disciplinary report of the USS John Adams. The individual reports were then compiled so the Secretary of the Navy could report to the United States Congress how pervasive flogging had become and to what extent it was utilized. In total for the years 1846–1847, flogging had been administered a reported 5,036 times on sixty naval vessels.

At the urging of New Hampshire Senator John P. Hale, the United States Congress banned flogging on all U.S. ships in September 1850, as part of a then-controversial amendment to a naval appropriations bill. Hale was inspired by Herman Melville's "vivid description of flogging, a brutal staple of 19th century naval discipline" in Melville's "novelized memoir" White Jacket. During Melville's time on the USS United States from 1843 to 1844, the ship log records 163 floggings, including some on his first and second days (18 and 19 August 1843) aboard the frigate at Honolulu, Oahu. Melville also included an intense depiction of flogging, and the circumstances surrounding it, in his more famous work, Moby-Dick.

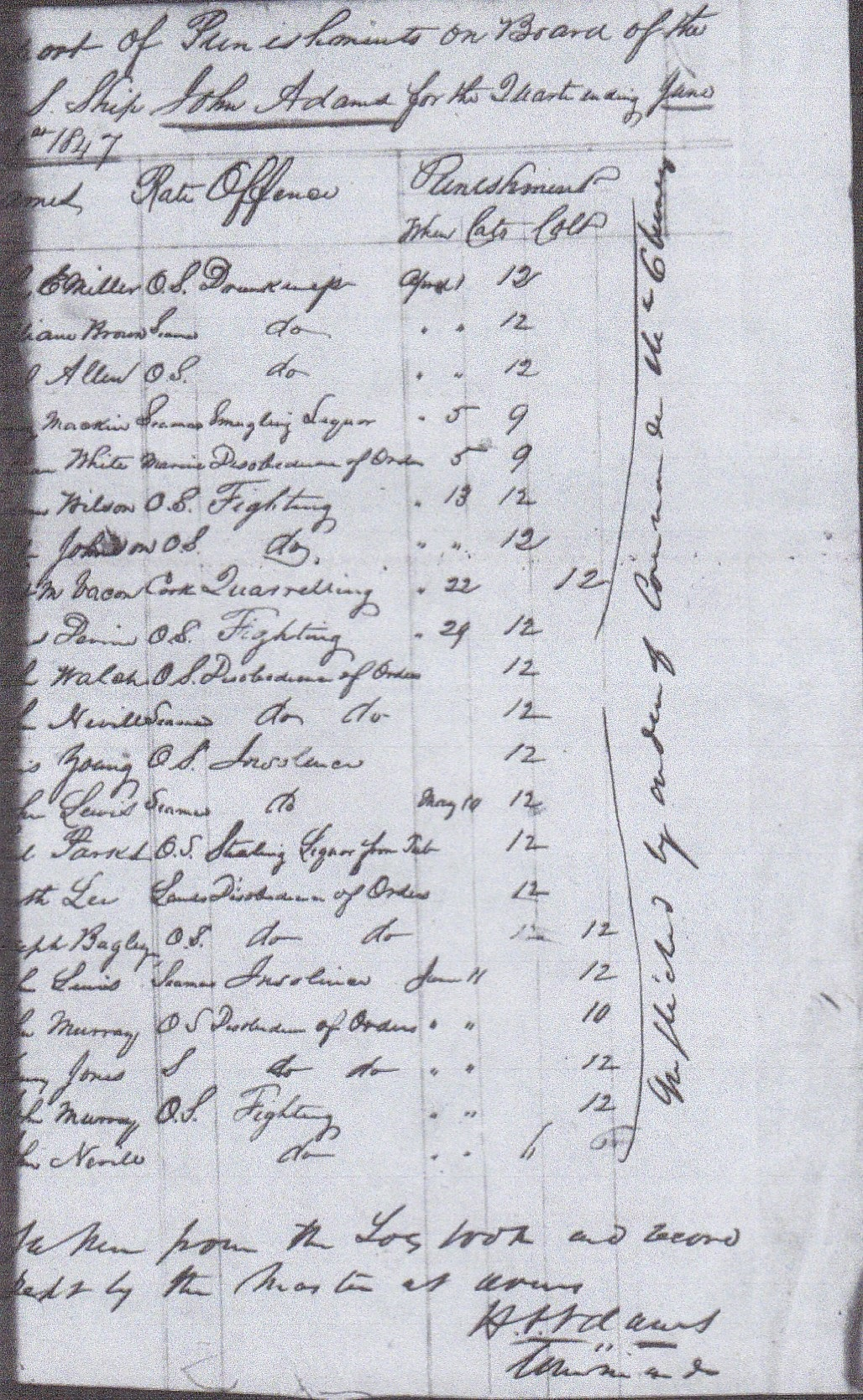
1847 disciplinary report re flogging, on the USS John Adams. The United States Congress banned flogging on all U.S. ships on 28 September 1850.

Military flogging was abolished in the United States Army on August 5th, 1861.

==== United Kingdom ====
Flagellation was so common in England as punishment that caning (and spanking and whipping) are called "the English vice".

Flogging was a common disciplinary measure in the Royal Navy that became associated with a seaman's manly disregard for pain. Generally, officers were not flogged. However, in 1745, a cashiered British officer's sword could be broken over his head, among other indignities inflicted on him. Aboard ships, knittles or the cat o' nine tails was used for severe formal punishment, while a "rope's end" or "starter" was used to administer informal, on-the-spot discipline. During the period 1790–1820, flogging in the British Navy on average consisted of 19.5 lashes per man. Some captains such as Thomas Masterman Hardy imposed even more severe penalties. Hardy while commanding HMS Victory, 1803–1805, raised punishments from the prior twelve lashes and twenty-four for more serious offenses to a new standard of thirty-six lashes with sixty lashes reserved for more serious infractions, such as theft or second offenses.

In severe cases a person could be "flogged around the fleet": a significant number of lashes (up to 600) was divided among the ships on a station and the person was taken to all ships to be flogged on each, or—when in harbour—bound in a ship's boat which was then rowed among the ships, with the ships' companies called to attention to observe the punishment.

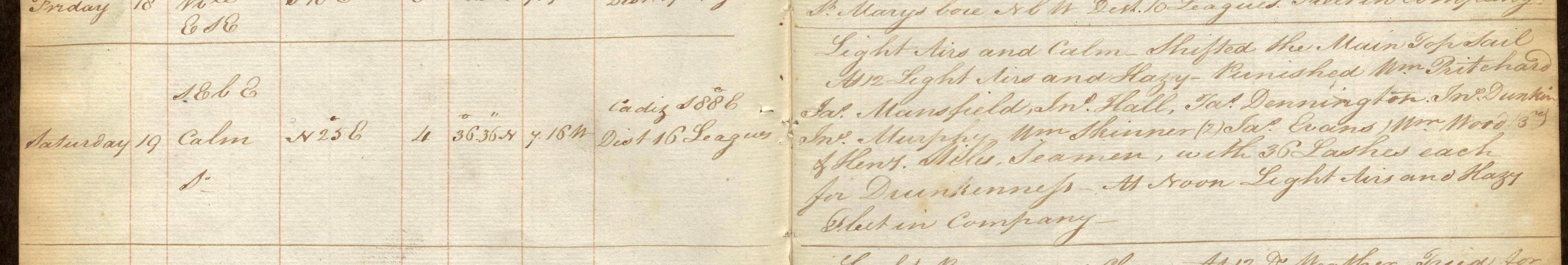
HMS VICTORY LOG, 19 October 1805, 36 lashes each

In June 1879 a motion to abolish flogging in the Royal Navy was debated in the House of Commons. John O'Connor Power, the member for Mayo, asked the First Lord of the Admiralty to bring the navy cat o' nine tails to the Commons Library so that the members might see what they were voting about. It was the Great "Cat" Contention, "Mr Speaker, since the Government has let the cat out of the bag, there is nothing to be done but to take the bull by the horns." Poet Laureate Ted Hughes celebrates the occasion in his poem, "Wilfred Owen's Photographs": "A witty profound Irishman calls/For a 'cat' into the House, and sits to watch/The gentry fingering its stained tails./Whereupon ...Quietly, unopposed,/The motion was passed."

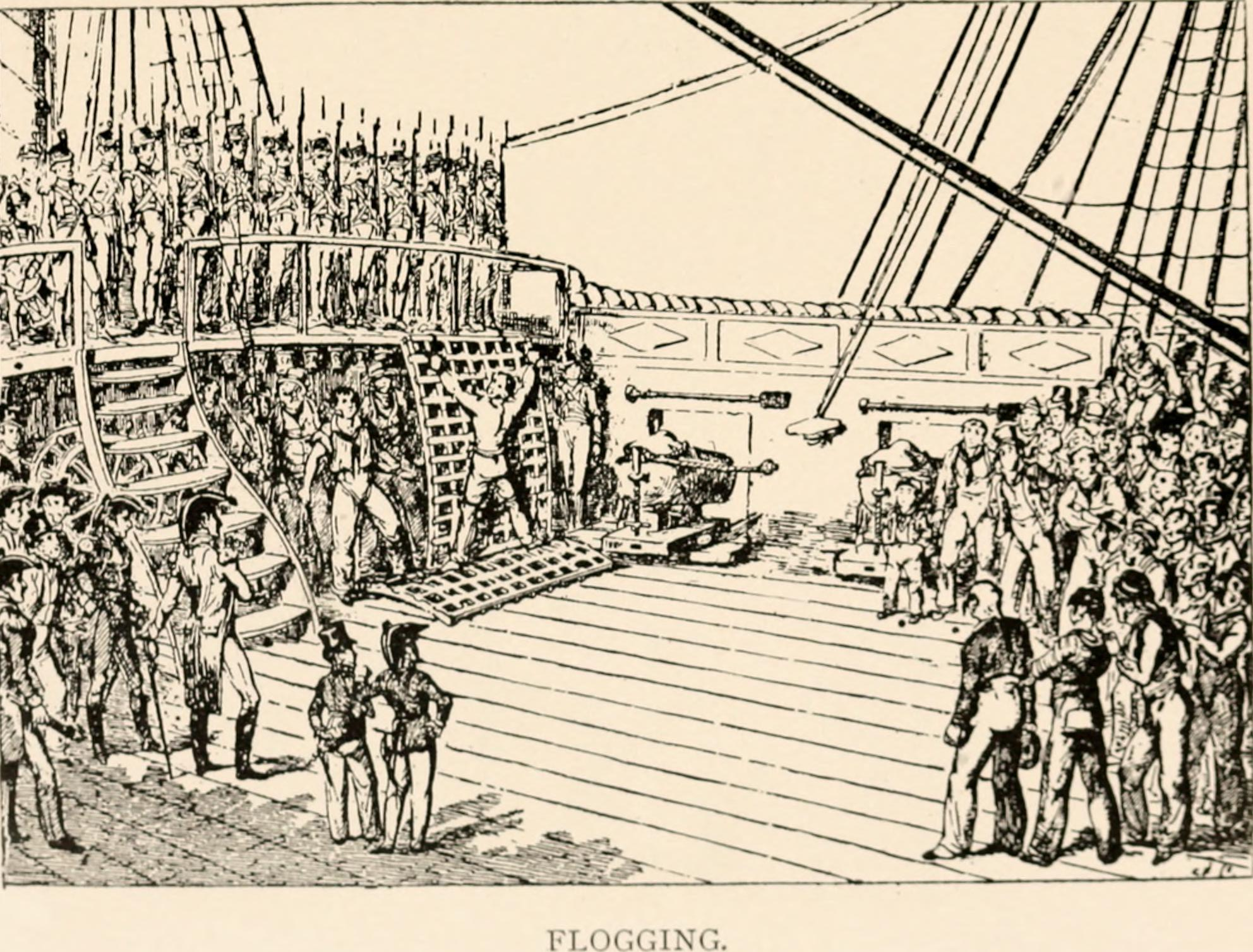
British sailor, tied to the grating, being flogged with cat o' nine tails

In the Napoleonic Wars, the maximum number of lashes that could be inflicted on soldiers in the British Army reached 1,200. This many lashes could permanently disable or kill a man. Charles Oman, historian of the Peninsular War, noted that the maximum sentence was inflicted "nine or ten times by general court-martial during the whole six years of the war" and that 1,000 lashes were administered about 50 times. Other sentences were for 900, 700, 500 and 300 lashes. One soldier was sentenced to 700 lashes for stealing a beehive. Another man was let off after only 175 of 400 lashes, but spent three weeks in the hospital. Later in the war, the more draconian punishments were abandoned and the offenders shipped to New South Wales instead, where more whippings often awaited them. (See Australian penal colonies section.) Oman later wrote:

If anything was calculated to brutalize an army it was the wicked cruelty of the British military punishment code, which Wellington to the end of his life supported. There is plenty of authority for the fact that the man who had once received his 500 lashes for a fault which was small, or which involved no moral guilt, was often turned thereby from a good soldier into a bad soldier, by losing his self-respect and having his sense of justice seared out. Good officers knew this well enough, and did their best to avoid the cat o' nine tails, and to try more rational means—more often than not with success.

The 3rd battalion's Royal Anglian Regiment nickname of "The Steelbacks" is taken from one of its former regiments, the 48th (Northamptonshire) Regiment of Foot who earned the nickname for their stoicism when being flogged with the cat o' nine tails ("Not a whimper under the lash"), a routine method of administering punishment in the Army in the 18th and early 19th centuries.

Shortly after the establishment of Northern Ireland the Special Powers Act of 1922 (known as the "Flogging Act") was enacted by the Parliament of Northern Ireland. The Act enabled the government to 'take all such steps and issue all such orders as may be necessary for preserving the peace and maintaining order'. This included flogging for firearms offenses and allowed authorities to prohibit inquests, impose curfews and ban organizations and newspapers. The long serving Home Affairs Minister Dawson Bates (1921–1943) was empowered to make any regulation felt necessary to preserve law and order. Breaking those regulations could bring a sentence of up to a year in prison with hard labour, and included whipping. This act was in place until 1973, when it was replaced with the Northern Ireland (Emergency Provisions) Act 1973. An imprisoned member of the Irish Republican Army (1922–1969), Frank Morris remembered his 15 "strokes of the cat" in 1942: "The pain was dreadful; you couldn't imagine it. The tail-ends cut my flesh to the bone, but I was determined not to scream and I didn't."

The King's German Legion (KGL), which were German units in British pay, did not flog. In one case, a British soldier on detached duty with the KGL was sentenced to be flogged, but the German commander refused to carry out the punishment. When the British 73rd Foot flogged a man in occupied France in 1814, disgusted French citizens protested against it.

==== France ====
During the French Revolutionary Wars the French Army stopped floggings altogether, inflicting death penalty or other severe corporal punishments instead.

=== Australian penal colonies ===
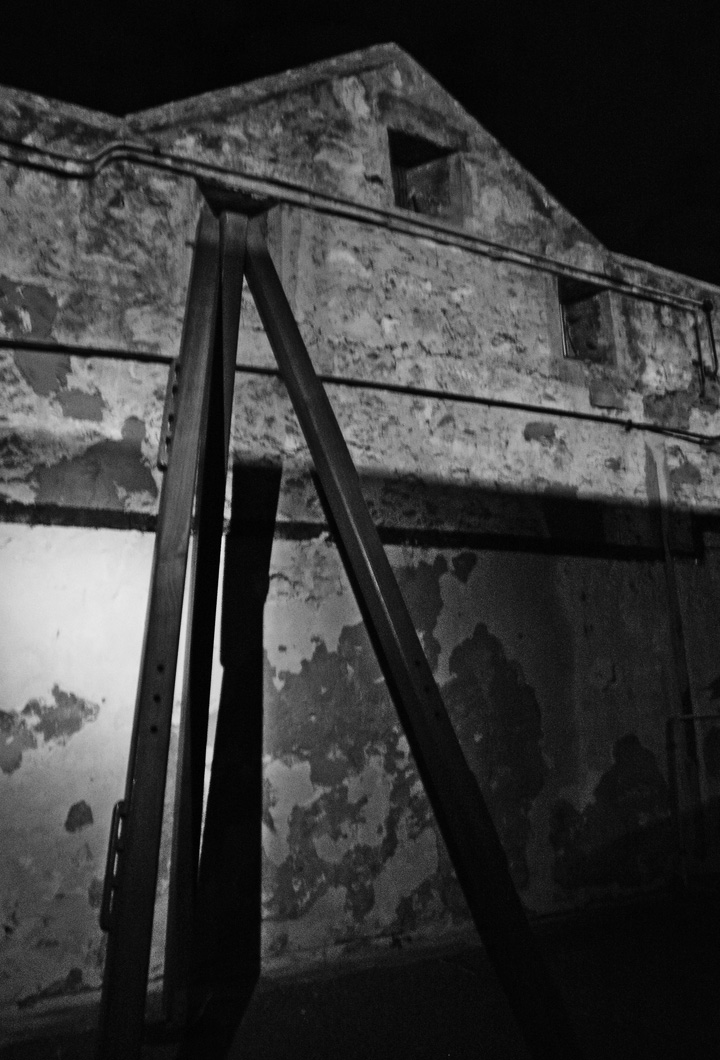
Fremantle Prison whipping post

Once common in the British Army and British Royal Navy as a means of discipline, flagellation also featured prominently in the British penal colonies in early colonial Australia. Given that convicts in Australia were already "imprisoned", punishments for offenses committed there could not usually result in imprisonment and thus usually consisted of corporal punishment such as hard labour or flagellation. Unlike Roman law, British law explicitly forbade the combination of corporal and capital punishment, so that a convict was either flogged or hanged but never both.

Flagellation took place either with a single whip or, more notoriously, with the cat o' nine tails. Typically, the offender's upper half was bared and he was suspended by the wrists beneath a tripod of wooden beams (known as 'the triangle'). In many cases, the offender's feet barely touched ground, which helped to stretch the skin taut and increase the damage inflicted by the whip. It also centered the offender's weight in his shoulders, further ensuring a painful experience.

With the prisoner thus stripped and bound, either one or two floggers administered the prescribed number of strokes, or "lashes," to the victim's back. During the flogging, a doctor or other medical worker was consulted at regular intervals as to the condition of the prisoner. In many cases, however, the physician merely observed the offender to determine whether he was conscious. If the prisoner passed out, the physician would order a halt until the prisoner was revived, and then the whipping would continue.

Female convicts were also subject to flogging as punishment, both on the convict ships and in the penal colonies. Although they were generally given fewer lashes than males (usually limited to 40 in each flogging), there was no other difference between the manner in which males and females were flogged.

Floggings of both male and female convicts were public, administered before the whole colony's company, assembled especially for the purpose. In addition to the infliction of pain, one of the principal purposes of the flogging was to humiliate offenders in front of their peers and to demonstrate, in a forceful way, that they had been required to submit to authority.

At the conclusion of the whipping, the prisoner's lacerated back was normally rinsed with brine, which served as a crude and painful disinfectant.

Flogging still continued for years after independence. The last person flogged in Australia was William John O'Meally in 1958 in Melbourne's Pentridge Prison.

== As a religious practice ==
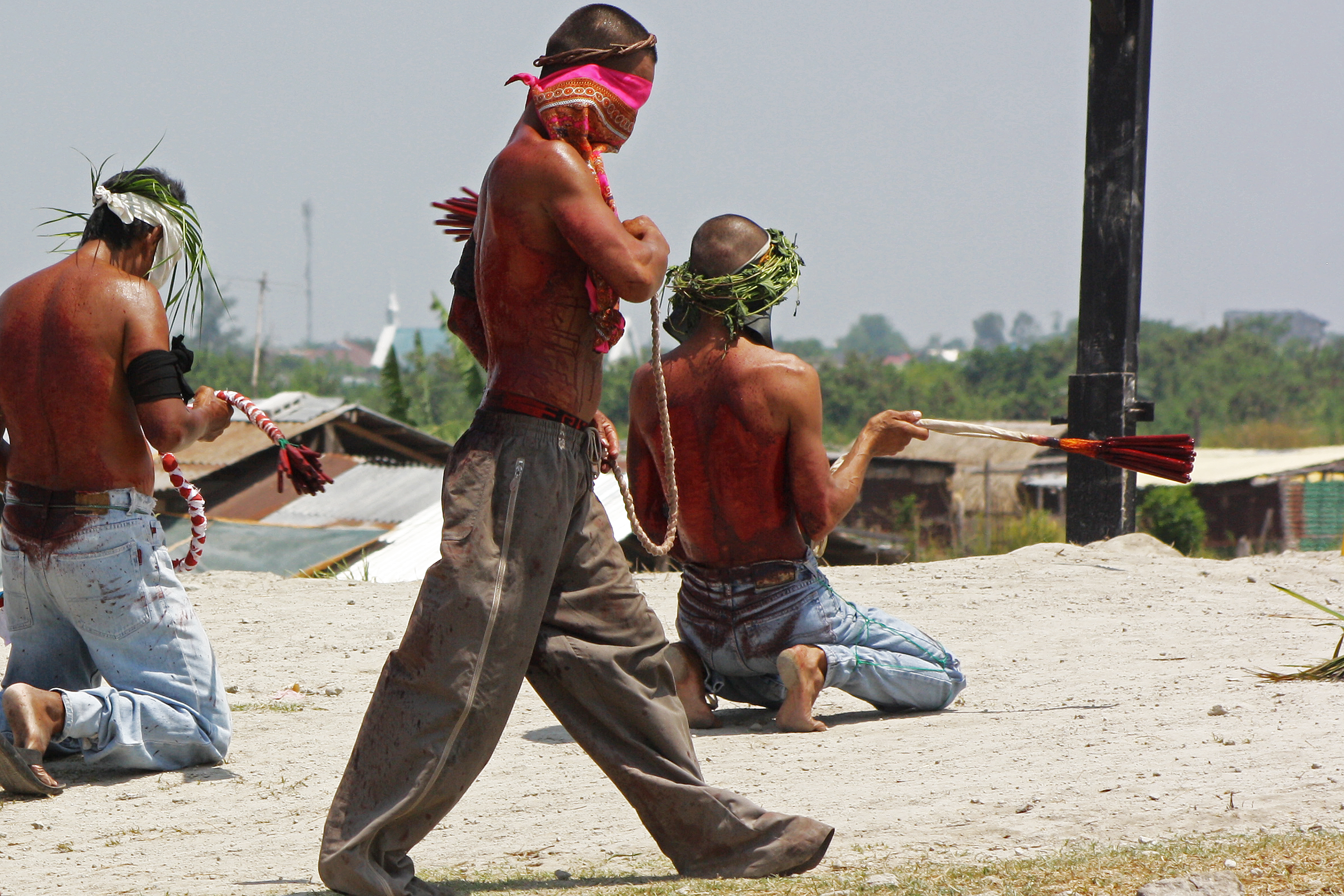
Self-flagellation is ritually performed in the Philippines during Holy Week (on Good Friday, before Easter).

=== Antiquity ===
During the Ancient Roman festival of Lupercalia, young men ran through the streets with thongs cut from the hides of goats which had just been sacrificed, whipping people with the thongs as they ran. According to Plutarch, women would put themselves in their way to receive blows on the hands, believing that this would help them to conceive or grant them an easy delivery. The eunuch priests of the goddess Cybele, the galli, flogged themselves until they bled during the annual festival called Dies Sanguinis. The initiation ceremonies of Greco-Roman mystery religions also sometimes involved ritual flagellation, as did the Spartan cult of Artemis Orthia.

=== Christianity ===
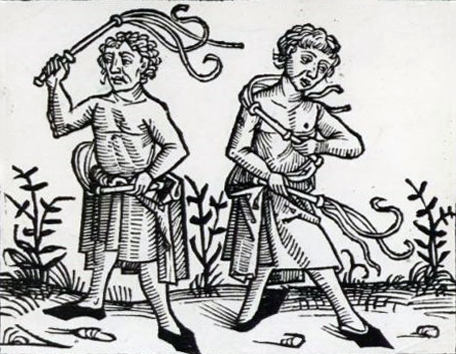
Flagellants, woodcut, c. 15th century

The Flagellation, in a Christian context, refers to an episode in the Passion of Christ prior to Jesus' crucifixion. The practice of mortification of the flesh for religious purposes has been utilised by members of various Christian denominations since the time of the Great Schism in 1054. Nowadays the instrument of penance is called a discipline, a cattail whip usually made of knotted cords, which is flung over the shoulders repeatedly during private prayer.

In the 13th century, a group of Roman Catholics, known as the Flagellants, took self-mortification to an extreme, and would travel to towns and publicly beat and whip each other while preaching repentance. As these demonstrations by nature were quite morbid and disorderly, they were, during periods of time, suppressed by the authorities. They continued to reemerge at different times up until the 16th century. Flagellation was also practised during the Black Plague as a means to purify oneself of sin and thus prevent contracting the disease. Pope Clement VI is known to have permitted it for this purpose in 1348, but changed course, as he condemned the Flagellants as a cult the following year.

Martin Luther, the Protestant Reformer, regularly practiced self-flagellation as a means of mortification of the flesh before leaving the Roman Catholic Church. Likewise, the Congregationalist writer Sarah Osborn (1714–1796) also practiced self-flagellation in order "to remind her of her continued sin, depravity, and vileness in the eyes of God". It became "quite common" for members of the Tractarian movement (see Oxford Movement, 1830s onwards) within the Anglican Communion to practice self-flagellation using the discipline. St. Thérèse of Lisieux, a late 19th-century French Discalced Carmelite nun considered in Catholicism to be a Doctor of the Church, is an influential example of a saint who questioned prevailing attitudes toward physical penance. Her view was that loving acceptance of the many sufferings of daily life was pleasing to God, and fostered loving relationships with other people, more than taking upon oneself extraneous sufferings through instruments of penance. As a Carmelite nun, Saint Thérèse practiced voluntary corporal mortification.

Some members of strict monastic orders, and some members of the Catholic lay organization Opus Dei, practice mild self-flagellation using the discipline. Pope John Paul II took the discipline regularly.

=== Islam ===
Islamic law or Sharia, is traditionally thought of by pious Muslims not as limited to religious obligations and rituals, but as all-encompassing -- covering, among other things, punishment for crime and sin. Flogging is one of the punishments sanctioned by Sharia, a prescribed punishment (hadd) for offences including fornication, alcohol use and slander; and also used as a discretionary punishment (ta'zir) for many other offences, such as violating gender interaction laws.

Some typical prescribed punishments according to Islamic law are 80 lashes for false accusation of adultery or fornication (qadhf); 40 to 80 lashes, (depending on the legal school), for drinking alcohol. Punishment is normally carried out in public. According to The New York Times, in Islam, lashes for punishment are often performed with the Qu'ran under one arm to minimise the swing and as a reminder of the source of legislation. They are not supposed to leave permanent scars, and when the number of lashes is high, are frequently done in batches to minimise risk of harm.

Traditionally in Islamic society, stringent restrictions on application of flogging and other hudud punishments, meant they were rarely applied. During the 19th century, Sharia-based criminal laws in many parts of the Islamic world outside of the Arabian peninsula, were replaced by statutes inspired by European models, but the Islamic revival and calls for full implementation of Shariah in the late 20th century brought reinstatement of lashing and other hudud punishments, if only on paper, in many Muslim countries. By 2013 about a dozen of the 50 or so Muslim-majority countries had made hudud applicable, many of those countries disregarding the traditional strict restrictions. In the 21st century, hudud, including flogging, is part of the legal systems of Afghanistan, Brunei, Iran, Mauritania, Saudi Arabia, the United Arab Emirates, Yemen, and northern part of Nigeria.

==== Shia Islam ====
One school of Islam, Shi'ism, does or has practiced self-flagellation (tatbir) as a voluntary religious ritual where the faithful punish themselves (although sometimes symbolically), not for mortification of the flesh in the Christian manner, but in memory of the suffering and death of Hussein (Husayn ibn Ali), and for not helping the martyr in his final hours. In Shia communities around the world, including India, Pakistan, Iraq and Lebanon, Shi'a march during the month of Muharram to mourn and grieve the martyrdom of Hussein and often participate in flogging involving bloodletting on their backs with knives, blades and chains. The practice is controversial and has been prohibited by Shi'a marjas (high ranking scholar who provide guidance to Shia lacking in scholarship) such as Ali Khamenei, former Supreme Leader of Iran, and Ayatollah Ali al-Sistani. Nonetheless, the practice continues among some Shi'ite men and boys.

== As a sexual practice ==
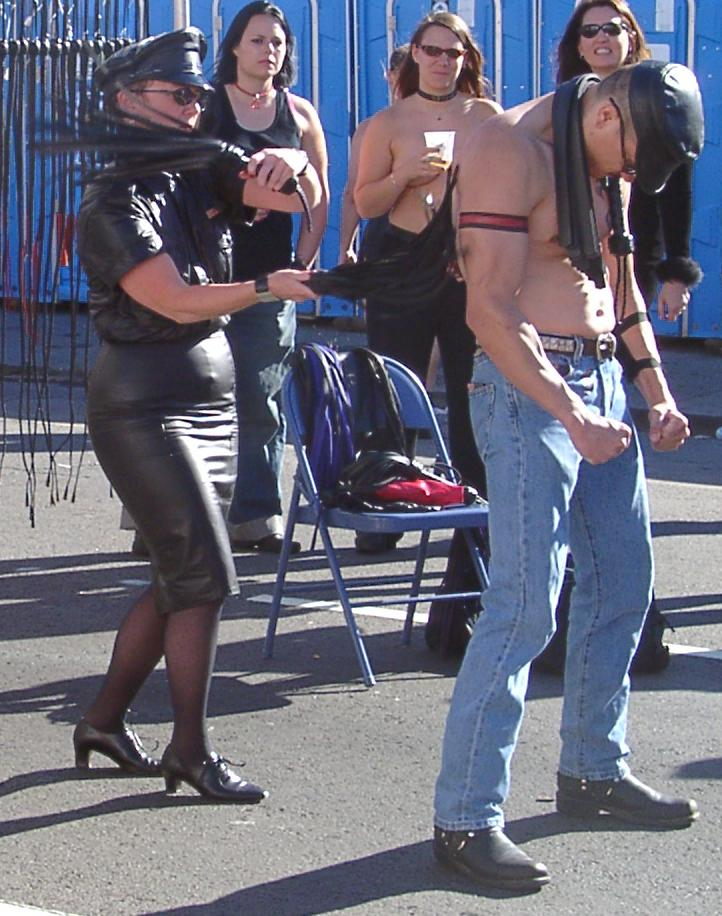
Flogging demonstration at the 2004 Folsom Street Fair in San Francisco

Flagellation is also used as a sexual practice in the context of BDSM. The intensity of the beating is usually far less than used for punishment.

There are anecdotal reports of people willingly being bound or whipped, as a prelude to or substitute for sex, during the 14th century. Flagellation practiced within an erotic setting has been recorded from at least the 1590s evidenced by a John Davies epigram, and references to "flogging schools" in Thomas Shadwell's The Virtuoso (1676) and Tim Tell-Troth's Knavery of Astrology (1680). Visual evidence such as mezzotints and print media in the 1600s is also identified revealing scenes of flagellation, such as in the late seventeenth-century English mezzotint "The Cully Flaug'd" from the British Museum collection.

John Cleland's novel Fanny Hill, published in 1749, incorporates a flagellation scene between the character's protagonist Fanny Hill and Mr Barville. A large number of flagellation publications followed, including Fashionable Lectures: Composed and Delivered with Birch Discipline (c. 1761), promoting the names of ladies offering the service in a lecture room with rods and cat o' nine tails.

== See also ==
- Algolagnia
- Flagellant confraternities
- Flaying
- Mortification of the flesh
- Spanking
