= Campaigns against corporal punishment =

Campaigns opposing physical punishment of children

Legal status of corporal punishment of children as of 2019: Illegal Legal (at least partially)

Campaigns against corporal punishment aim to reduce or eliminate corporal punishment of minors by instigating legal and cultural changes in the areas where such punishments are practiced. Such campaigns date mostly from the late 20th century, although occasional voices in opposition to corporal punishment existed from ancient times through to the modern era.

The UN Committee on the Rights of the Child defines "corporal punishment" as:

any punishment in which physical force is used and intended to cause some degree of pain or discomfort, however light. Most involves hitting ("smacking", "slapping", "spanking") children, with the hand or with an implement – whip, stick, belt, shoe, wooden spoon, etc. But it can also involve, for example, kicking, shaking or throwing children, scratching, pinching, biting, pulling hair or boxing ears, forcing children to stay in uncomfortable positions, burning, scalding or forced ingestion.

== History ==
Quintilian and Plutarch, both writing in the 1st century A.D., expressed the opinion that corporal punishment was demeaning to those who were not slaves, meaning the children of the freeborn. In contrast, according to the classicist Otto Kiefer, Seneca remarked to his friend Lucilius, "Fear and love cannot live together. You seem to me to do right in refusing to be feared by your slaves and chastising them with words alone. Blows are used to correct brute beasts".

However, according to Robert McCole Wilson, "it is only in the last two hundred years that there has been a growing body of opinion" opposed to corporal punishment.

== Australia ==
Jordan Riak began working against corporal punishment when he was residing with his children in Sydney, Australia. Corporal punishment was eventually banned in the public schools of all Australian states, and the private schools of all states except Queensland.

== United Kingdom ==
In the United Kingdom, one of the earliest organised campaigns was that of the Humanitarian League, with its regular magazine The Humanitarian, which campaigned for several years for the abolition of the chastisement of young seamen in the Royal Navy, a goal partially achieved in 1906 when naval birching was abandoned as a summary punishment. However, it did not manage to get the Navy to abolish caning as a punishment, which continued at Naval training establishments until 1967.

The Howard League for Penal Reform campaigned in the 1930s for, among many other things, the abolition of judicial corporal punishment by cat-o'-nine-tails or birching. This was eventually achieved in the U.K. in 1948.

The Society of Teachers Opposed to Physical Punishment (STOPP) was set up in the U.K. in 1968 to campaign for the abolition of corporal punishment in UK schools.

STOPP was a very small pressure group that lobbied government, local authorities and other official institutions. It also investigated individual cases of corporal punishment and aided families wishing to pursue their cases through the UK and European courts.

The UK Parliament abolished corporal punishment in state schools in 1986. STOPP then wound itself up and ceased to exist, though some of the same individuals went on to form EPOCH (End Physical punishment Of Children) to campaign to outlaw spanking, and spanking in the domestic setting.

A campaign by the name of Children Are Unbeatable! involves more than 350 separate groups, including the National Society for the Prevention of Cruelty to Children, Barnardo's, Save the Children, Action for Children (formerly NCH), and the National Children's Bureau.

== Canada ==
In CFCYL v. Canada, the Supreme Court of Canada upheld section 43 of the Criminal Code, which allows for a defence of reasonable use of force by way of correction towards children.

== United States ==
An early U.S. activist against corporal punishment was Horace Mann, who in the 19th century unsuccessfully opposed its use in schools.

Several organizations have been formed in the United States to advocate abolishing corporal punishment in homes or schools, including:

- Parents and Teachers Against Violence in Education (PTAVE), based in California
- The Center for Effective Discipline, now part of the Gundersen National Child Protection Training Center (NCPTC) of Winona (MN) State University
- The U.S. Alliance to End the Hitting of Children
- People Opposed to Paddling Students (POPS), based in Texas
- Floridians Against Corporal Punishment in Public School, based in Florida
- The Alliance Against Corporal Punishment
- The National Youth Rights Association
- We the Children Foundation

Individuals who have directly advocated against corporal punishment include, but are not limited to:

- Kirstie Alley (1951-2022), Actress - has stated her opposition to corporal punishment on numerous occasions, most notably on the Howard Stern Show
- Nadine Block, wrote the bill which banned corporal punishment from public schools in Ohio in 2009
- Blythe and David Daniel, Professors - advocate and teach children's rights and work for laws against corporal punishment
- Blake Hutchison (born 1980), writer of Nobody's Property, independent filmmaker and videographer from Ohio who has made several often-controversial children's rights and anti-spanking videos on his YouTube channel. including one titled "Children's Rights Pyrotechnic Practice" where he sets fire to a copy of Michael and Debi Pearl's highly controversial book To Train Up A Child (a book which he says is a "training" book to assault kids).
- Horace Mann, campaigned to ban corporal punishment from schools during the 19th century
- Dr. Phil McGraw (born 1950), Television Show Host has had episodes on his show dedicated to showing the harm or ineffectiveness of corporal punishment.
- Marcus Lawrence Ward (1812–1884), governor of New Jersey from 1866 to 1869, who signed into law the public and private school corporal punishment ban during his time in office, which is still in effect today.
- Jordan Riak (1935–2016), drafted the bill which banned corporal punishment from public schools in California in the 1980s
- Daniel Vander Ley (born 1982), using the BeatYourChildren.com campaign and the "Fundamentalism - America's Premier Child Abuse Brand" campaign, Vander Ley communicates directly with governments around the world offering their constituents research about the negative effects of corporal punishment and religious extremism.

== Worldwide ==
An organisation called "Global Initiative To End All Corporal Punishment Of Children" was formed in 2001 to campaign for the worldwide prohibition by law of all corporal punishment of children, in homes, schools, penal institutions, and other settings. It seeks to monitor the legal situation in every country of the world. The Global Initiative has received endorsement from UNICEF, UNESCO, the United Nations High Commissioner for Human Rights, the Commissioner for Human Rights of the Council of Europe, the Parliamentary Assembly of the Council of Europe, and the European Network of Ombudsmen for Children.

In 2008, the UN Study on Violence against Children set a target date of 2009 for universal prohibition, including in the home, an aim described by The Economist the same year as "wildly unrealistic".

The Society for Prevention of Injuries & Corporal Punishment [SPIC] is an Indian organization advocating measures to stop corporal punishment in schools by making teachers and students aware of its dangers.

In Austria, the White Hand Campaign for a worldwide legal ban on child corporal punishment tries to raise awareness for the topic in the German-speaking countries.

== See also ==
- Caning
- Child corporal punishment laws
- Corporal punishment in the home
- Judicial corporal punishment
- Paddling (punishment)
- School corporal punishment
- Spanking
