= Ladele v London Borough of Islington =

United Kingdom labour law case

- Court: Court of Appeal of England and Wales
- Citation: [2009 EWCA Civ 1357] [2013 ECHR 37]

Case opinions
- Lord Neuberger MR

Keywords
- Discrimination, harassment, indirect discrimination, homophobia

Ladele v London Borough of Islington [2009] EWCA Civ 1357 is a UK labour law case concerning discrimination against same sex couples by a religious person in a public office.

== Facts ==
Lillian Ladele worked as a registrar for marriages, births, and deaths for the London Borough of Islington. Prior to the introduction of the introduction of the Civil Partnership Act 2004, Ladele asked Islington not to designate her a civil partnership registrar. Islington refused this request and following the introduction of the Civil Partnership Act 2004, Islington designated all of its existing registrars as civil partnership registrars as well as marriage registrars. Ladele objected to being required to officiate at civil partnership ceremonies due to her Christian beliefs. Islington disciplined and threatened to dismiss her. Ladele claimed that this treatment was unlawfully discriminatory, and that she should not be required to perform civil partnerships, taking into account her religious beliefs. Therefore, Ladele made an application to the Employment Tribunal, complaining of direct and indirect discrimination on grounds of religion or belief and harassment.

The Employment Tribunal held that she had been directly and indirectly discriminated against, as well as harassed. The Employment Appeal Tribunal reversed the decision, and Ladele appealed to the Court of Appeal. She claimed that allegations of direct discrimination and harassment should have been remitted. Islington and Liberty as intervener argued there was no choice, given the Equality Act (Sexual Orientation) Regulations 2007 to do anything but require Ms Ladele to do her full duties.

== Judgment ==
=== Court of Appeal ===
Lord Dyson MR held there was no reason to remit the case on direct discrimination or harassment. The Tribunal erred, because (1) it could not be discrimination to treat all employees in the same way (2) the appropriate comparator was a hypothetical someone who disliked gay people without it being due to a religious belief (3) looking at the plain words of regulation 5 it was clear that Ladele had not been harassed.

35. It is true that, on a pedantically literal, unrealistic, or acontextual interpretation of one or two of the recorded remarks made to Ms Ladele during 2007, it could be argued that, at least in some respects, she was being treated in the ways she complains of because of her religious beliefs... It seems clear to me that this statement was directed not to Ms Ladele's belief with regard to civil partnerships, but to the manifestation of that belief, namely her refusal to conduct such partnership duties...

[...]

52. ... the fact that Ms Ladele's refusal to perform civil partnerships was based on her religious view of marriage could not justify the conclusion that Islington should not be allowed to implement its aim to the full, namely that all registrars should perform civil partnerships as part of its Dignity for All policy. Ms Ladele was employed in a public job and was working for a public authority; she was being required to perform a purely secular task, which was being treated as part of her job; Ms Ladele's refusal to perform that task involved discriminating against gay people in the course of that job; she was being asked to perform the task because of Islington's Dignity for All policy, whose laudable aim was to avoid, or at least minimise, discrimination both among Islington's employees, and as between Islington (and its employees) and those in the community they served; Ms Ladele's refusal was causing offence to at least two of her gay colleagues; Ms Ladele's objection was based on her view of marriage, which was not a core part of her religion; and Islington's requirement in no way prevented her from worshipping as she wished.

[...]

60. Casting one's eyes beyond Europe, it is worth quoting what Sachs J, giving the judgment of the Constitutional Court of South Africa, said in Christian Education South Africa v Minister of Education (2000) Case CCT 4/00, paragraph 35:

‘The underlying problem in any open and democratic society based on human dignity, equality and freedom in which conscientious and religious freedom has to be regarded with appropriate seriousness, is how far such democracy can and must go in allowing members of religious communities to define for themselves which laws they will obey and which not. Such a society can cohere only if all its participants accept that certain basic norms and standards are binding. Accordingly, believers cannot claim an automatic right to be exempted by their beliefs from the laws of the land. At the same time, the state should, wherever reasonably possible, seek to avoid putting believers to extremely painful and intensely burdensome choices of either being true to their faith or else respectful of the law.’

61 The conclusion reached by the South African Supreme Court in that case was that a ban on corporal punishment had to be complied with by Christians whose religious beliefs extended to believing in the right, indeed, in certain circumstances, the obligation of a teacher to chastise a child physically. This conclusion was, of course, consistent with the subsequent decision to much the same effect of the House of Lords in R (Williamson) v Secretary of State for Education and Employment [2005] 2 AC 246.

So far as indirect discrimination went, it was clear that the council had pursued a legitimate aim that all registrars should perform civil partnership duties as part of its dignity policy. This is performing a purely secular task. Furthermore, her view of marriage was not a core part of Ms Ladele’s religion. The requirement to perform her job’s duties did not prevent her from worshipping as she wished. It is clear that ECHR art 9 is a qualified right. Ms Ladele’s views could not override the employer’s concern to ensure equal respect for the gay community. "As Lord Hoffmann put it in R(SB) v Governors of Denbigh High School 'Article 9 does not require that one should be allowed to manifest one's religion at any time and place of one's own choosing'."

Smith LJ concurred.

=== European Court of Human Rights ===
Ladele made an application to the European Court of Human Rights following the Court of Appeal's decision, claiming that the United Kingdom had discriminated against her on the basis of her religion, contrary to Article 14 taken together with Article 9 of the Convention. She did not argue that her right to freedom of religion had itself been infringed.

Her case was joined with those of three other applicants who had brought similar claims against the UK, and the Court, sitting as a Chamber, delivered judgment in the case of Eweida v United Kingdom [2013] ECHR 37. The Court dismissed her complaint. Permission to appeal to the Grand Chamber of the Court was refused, thus the judgment of the Chamber became final on 27 May 2013.

== See also ==
- UK labour law
- UK employment equality law
