= Child corporal punishment laws =

Overview of laws by country

The legality of corporal punishment of children varies by country. Corporal punishment of minor children by parents or adult guardians, which is intended to cause physical pain, has been traditionally legal in nearly all countries unless explicitly outlawed. According to a 2014 estimate by Human Rights Watch, "Ninety percent of the world's children live in countries where corporal punishment and other physical violence against children is still legal". Many countries' laws provide for a defence of "reasonable chastisement" against charges of assault and other crimes for parents using corporal punishment. This defence is ultimately derived from English law. As of 2026, only one (France) permanent member of the United Nations Security Council along with three (adding Germany and Japan) of seven G7 members and seven (adding Argentina, Brazil, South Africa and South Korea) of the 20 G20 member states have banned the use of corporal punishment against children.

== Prohibition ==
Countries (or territories) that have (or will have) completely prohibited corporal punishment of children are listed below (in chronological order):

- Sweden (1979)
- Finland (1983)
- Norway (1987)
- Austria (1989)
- Cyprus (1994)
- Denmark (1997)
- Latvia (1998)
- Croatia (1999)
- Bulgaria (2000)
- Germany (2000)
- Israel (2000)
- Turkmenistan (2002)
- Iceland (2003)
- Ukraine (2004)
- Romania (2004)
- Hungary (2005)
- Greece (2006)
- Netherlands (2007)
- New Zealand (2007)
- Portugal (2007)
- Uruguay (2007)
- Venezuela (2007)
- Chile (2007)
- Spain (2007)
- Togo (2007)
- Costa Rica (2008)
- Moldova (2008)
- Luxembourg (2008)
- Liechtenstein (2008)
- Poland (2010)
- Tunisia (2010)
- Kenya (2010)
- Congo, Republic of (2010)
- Albania (2010)
- South Sudan (2011)
- North Macedonia (2013)
- Cape Verde (2013)
- Honduras (2013)
- Malta (2014)
- Brazil (2014)
- Bolivia (2014)
- Argentina (2014)
- San Marino (2014)
- Nicaragua (2014)
- Estonia (2014)
- Andorra (2014)
- Benin (2015)
- Ireland (2015)
- Peru (2015)
- Mongolia (2016)
- Montenegro (2016)
- Paraguay (2016)
- Aruba (2016)
- Slovenia (2016)
- Lithuania (2017)
- Nepal (2018)
- Kosovo (2019)
- France (2019)
- South Africa (2019)
- Jersey (2019)
- Japan (2020)
- Georgia (2020)
- Scotland (2020)
- Seychelles (2020)
- Guinea (2021)
- Colombia (2021)
- South Korea (2021)
- Wales (2022)
- Cuba (2022)
- Zambia (2022)
- Mauritius (2022)
- Laos (2023)
- Tajikistan (2024)
- Thailand (2025)
- Czech Republic (2025)
- Switzerland (2025)

== Laws by country ==
=== Argentina ===
Banned in 1813, school corporal punishment was re-legalised in 1817 and punishments by physical pain lasted until the 1980s. The instruments were rebenques, slappings in the face and others. All corporal punishment was prohibited by a law in 2014 which came into force in January 2016.

=== Australia ===
In Australia, corporal punishment of minors in the home is legal, provided it is "reasonable". Corporal punishment in public schools is illegal in all states, and in private schools it is only allowed in Queensland. Parents who act unreasonably may be committing an assault. The Australian state of Tasmania is continuing to review the state's laws on the matter, and may seek to ban the use of corporal punishment by parents. The matter is also under review in other Australian states. A 2002 public opinion survey suggested the majority view was in support of retaining parents' right to smack with the open hand but not with an implement, although as of 2010, there are no laws against using an implement in any state or territory. In New South Wales, S61AA of the Crimes Act (1900) allows a parent a defence of lawful correction. In New South Wales, one specifically cannot smack a child on the head or neck, and the child cannot be more than briefly harmed or bruised.

=== Austria ===
School corporal punishment was explicitly prohibited in Austria in 1974. In 1977, corporal punishment in the home was outlawed by removing the section in the constitution of assault in the Penal Code that stated that parents who have used "reasonable punishment" of their children shall not be punished for assault. On 15 March 1989, corporal punishment of children became explicitly banned through a new law stating that "using violence and inflicting physical or mental suffering is unlawful".

=== Belarus ===
Corporal punishment in schools was banned in Belarus during the Soviet era, however it was decriminalized after its authoritarian president Alexander Lukashenko took power in 1994. It is only permitted for male students older than 14. It cannot be inflicted on girls. School beltings are rare in major cities and remain much more common in rural areas, where parents tend to raise their children in more conservative manners. In 2018, Lukashenko rejected the bill that would have outlawed corporal punishments for minors both in educational facilities and at home, arguing that he himself belted his children in their adolescence to discipline them.

=== Canada ===
In Canada, parents may use physical force to discipline their children, including spanking, but there are several restrictions.

Section 43 of the Criminal Code provides that parents may use "reasonable" force as a form of discipline. The constitutionality of this provision was challenged in the courts, on the basis that it infringed the rights of children, contrary to three sections of the Canadian Charter of Rights and Freedoms: the right to security of the person, protected by section 7 of the Charter; the right to be free from cruel and unusual treatment and punishment, protected by section 12 of the Charter; and the right to equality (specifically, age), protected by section 15 of Charter. In 2004, the Supreme Court of Canada dismissed the constitutional challenge on all grounds, on a 6–3 split, in Canadian Foundation for Children, Youth and the Law v. Canada.

In upholding section 43, the majority of the Court provided considerable guidance to the interpretation of the provision. The majority held that the person administering the discipline must be a parent or legal guardian, or in some cases, a school teacher (i.e. non-parental relatives such as grandparents, aunts, or uncles, as well as babysitters and other caretakers, are banned from spanking); that the force must be used "by way of correction" (sober, reasoned uses of force that address the actual behaviour of the child and are designed to restrain, control or express some symbolic disapproval of his or her behaviour), that the child must be capable of benefiting from the correction (i.e. not under the age of 2 or over 12), and that the use of force must be "reasonable under the circumstances", meaning that it results neither in harm nor in the prospect of bodily harm. Punishment involving slaps or blows to the head is harmful, the Court held. Use of any implement other than a bare hand is illegal and hitting a child in anger or in retaliation for something a child did is not considered reasonable and is against the law. The Court defined "reasonable" as force that would have a "transitory and trifling" impact on the child. For example, spanking or slapping a child so hard that it leaves a mark that lasts for several hours would not be considered "transitory and trifling".

Among the recommendations of the Truth and Reconciliation Commission, formed to redress the legacy of the Canadian Indian residential school system, is a call to repeal Section 43 of the Criminal Code.

=== Colombia ===
On 23 March 2021, the Senate of Colombia unanimously voted to approve a bill that prohibits physical punishment, cruel, humiliating, or degrading acts, and violence as forms of correctional approaches for the upbringing of children and adolescents in Colombia.

=== Czech Republic ===
Until 2026, the Czech Republic had remained the only country in the European Union that does not outlaw child corporal punishment or plan to introduce such a law. On July 17, 2025, the president signed an amendment to the Civil Code, making corporal punishment of children explicitly prohibited by law, beginning January 1, 2026.

=== Denmark ===
Corporal punishment in schools in Denmark became explicitly prohibited in 1967 and in 1985, parents' right to use corporal punishment of their children became outlawed through a new law which required parents "to protect their child from physical and psychological violence and other humiliating treatment". However, the law was believed to still support corporal punishment as there was a controversy whether the law permitted parents to punish their children physically or otherwise. Therefore, after several years of debate, a new, clearer law came into force on 28 May 1997, providing that "The child has right to care and security. It must be treated with respect for its person and must not be subjected to corporal punishment or other humiliating treatment".

Denmark's autonomous territories, the Faroe Islands and Greenland, banned corporal punishment of children in 2007 and 2016, respectively.

=== Finland ===
School corporal punishment was banned in 1914. Parents' right to use corporal punishment of their children was outlawed in 1969 when the section in the constitution of assault in the Penal Code, stating that a "petty assault" was not punishable if committed by parents or others who exercise their right to chastise a child, was removed. In 1983, corporal punishment of children was explicitly banned.

=== France ===
In the Napoleonic era parents were explicitly allowed to physically punish their children. Spanking was previously popular, with 85% of French parents admitting to using it. However, in 2019, the National Assembly approved a bill introducing a complete ban on all forms of physical punishment of children and required mayors officiating at civil weddings to remind couples that violence against children is unlawful. The law makes corporal punishment a civil offense, not a criminal one.

=== Germany ===
School corporal punishment was prohibited in East Germany (which became part of the Federal Republic of Germany at the German reunification on 3 October 1990). In the Federal Republic (West Germany before reunification), it was prohibited at different times in its different states between 1975 and 1983.

In the Federal Republic of Germany, in 1980 it became prohibited for parents to educate their children with "degrading measures" (it was not clear exactly what "degrading" meant), of which the common interpretation was that corporal punishment of children was still permitted as long as it was not "degrading". On 1 July 1998, corporal punishment was outlawed through a new law stating that "Degrading educational measures, especially physical and psychological maltreatment, are inadmissible"; the common interpretation of that law was that parents still had some right to use corporal punishment on their children. In November 2000, that law was replaced with a new more clear and strict law stating that "Children have right to a non-violent upbringing. Corporal punishment, psychological violence and other degrading educational measures are inadmissible."

=== Greece ===
The 2006 enacted Law 3500/06 on the treatment of domestic violence prohibits the use of physical violence against a minor as a means of punishment in the context of his upbringing, with the explicit clarification - in the explanatory memorandum - that corporal punishment is not included. to the permissible penitentiary measures of article 1518 of the Civil Code and that its use entails for the parents the consequences of the bad exercise of parental care.

Specifically, Article 4 provides that physical violence against minors as a means of punishment in the context of their upbringing brings about the consequences of Article 1532 of the Civil Code. The explanatory memorandum to this article states, among other things: “The regulation of Article 4 makes it clear that corporal punishment against children is not included in the permissible punishment measures of Article 1518 of the Civil Code in accordance with modern pedagogical views. It constitutes a case of poor exercise of custody and for this reason brings about the application of article 1532 of the Civil Code. According to this article, in such a case, the court may order any appropriate measure. "Any act of inflicting pain or physical discomfort on a minor should be treated as physical violence, with the aim of punishing or controlling his behavior."

=== Ireland ===
In Ireland, all forms of corporal punishment of children have been definitively outlawed since the passing of the Children First Act 2015. Law in the Republic of Ireland inherited the pre-independence common law and statutes modelled on English law. These included allowance under common law of "physical chastisement" by teachers, and under the Children Act 1908 (8 Edw. 7. c. 67) of "reasonable chastisement" by parents and those in loco parentis. School corporal punishment was prohibited in 1982 by an administrative decision of John Boland, the Minister for Education. Teachers were not liable to criminal prosecution until 1997, when the rule of law allowing physical chastisement was explicitly abolished. The Children Act 2001 repealed the 1908 act but, except in children detention schools, did not explicitly prohibit corporal punishment; the common-law defence of "reasonable chastisement" remained available to parents facing a charge of assault. In response to a complaint filed with the European Committee of Social Rights, the defence was abolished under the Children First Act 2015.

=== Italy ===
School corporal punishment became prohibited in 1928. In 1996, the Supreme Court of Italy ruled that in domestic settings, physical punishment is no longer an acceptable way to discipline children. However, that is still yet to be confirmed in legislation.

=== India ===
In India, corporal punishment is banned in schools, daycare and alternative child care institutions. However, there are no prohibitions of it at home. The National Policy for Children 2013 states that in education, the state shall “ensure no child is subjected to any physical punishment or mental harassment” and “promote positive engagement to impart discipline so as to provide children with a good learning experience”. Corporal punishment is prohibited in schools in the Right to Free and Compulsory Education Act 2009 (RTE Act). Article 17 states: “(1) No child shall be subjected to physical punishment or mental harassment. (2) Whoever contravenes the provisions of sub-section (1) shall be liable to disciplinary action under the service rules applicable to such person.” Guidance (”Advisory for Eliminating Corporal Punishment in Schools under Section 35(1) of the RTE Act 2009”) which sets out the national law relevant to corporal punishment in schools, the international human rights standards, steps that may be taken to promote positive child development and not resorting to corporal punishment, and the role of national bodies in implementing the RTE Act, stating: “This advisory should be used by the State Governments/UT Administrations to ensure that appropriate State/school level guidelines on prevention of corporate punishment and appropriate redressal of any complaints, are framed, disseminated, acted upon and monitored.”

According to Vasudev Sharma, the executive director of Child Rights Trust, Bengaluru, "Many teachers hauled up for corporal punishment claim protection under Sections 88 and 89 of the Indian Penal Code (IPC) saying they were taking action in good faith." Section 88 protects "Acts not intended to cause death, done by consent in good faith for person’s benefit" and Section 89 "act[s] done in good faith for benefit of child or insane person, by or by consent of guardian."

=== Israel ===
On 25 January 2000, the Supreme Court of Israel issued the landmark Plonit decision ruling that "corporal punishment of children by their parents is never educational", "always causes serious harm to the children" and "is indefensible". This decision repealed section 7 of article 27 of the Civil Wrongs Ordinance 1944, which provided a defence for the use of corporal punishment in childrearing, and stated that "the law imposes an obligation on state authorities to intervene in the family unit and to protect the child when necessary, including from his parents." As a result, all kinds of physical discipline against children were automatically banned through the country, as confirmed by multiple subsequent court rulings.

=== Nepal ===
In September 2018, Nepal adopted the "Children's act 2018" which criminalises corporal punishment of children in all settings.

=== New Zealand ===
The Crimes (Substituted Section 59) Amendment Act 2007 or "anti-smacking bill" was introduced as a member's bill by Green Party Member of Parliament Sue Bradford in 2005 passed on its third reading on 16 May 2007 by 113 votes to eight.

The 2009 New Zealand citizens-initiated referendum posed the question: "Should a smack as part of good parental correction be a criminal offence in New Zealand?" 87.4% of votes answered "No". The referendum was non-binding and did not lead to a change in the law. It was noted at the time that "the wording of the proposition was misleading and ambiguous".

=== Norway ===
School corporal punishment was explicitly prohibited in 1936. In 1972, an 1891 law that gave parents some right to use corporal punishment of their children was removed from the constitution of assault in the Penal Code, which made corporal punishment of children unlawful and punishable as assault. In order to clarify that violence towards children is not allowed, an explicit ban on corporal punishment of children came into force in 1987.

However, the Supreme Court of Norway ruled in 2005 that a light "careful slap" applied immediately after the "offence" was still allowed. The legislature abolished this in 2010, and the current law is that any violence against children, including "careful slaps", is prohibited.

=== Philippines ===
Legislation to ban corporal punishment against children has been proposed in the Philippines. In 2023 under the 19th Congress, House Bills 8306 and House Bill 1269 were filed to penalize individuals practicing corporal punishment.

=== Poland ===
In 1783, Poland became the world's first country to outlaw school corporal punishment and the first Slavic country to outlaw corporal punishment. According to article 40 in the 1997 Constitution of Poland, "No one may be subjected to torture or cruel, inhuman, or degrading treatment or punishment. The application of corporal punishment shall be prohibited." However, there was a controversy whether parents' right to use corporal punishment of their children was supported by law or not, until 2010, when it became explicitly prohibited.

=== South Africa ===
Common-law precedent in South Africa held that a parent may "inflict moderate and reasonable chastisement" on a child. The judicial corporal punishment of juveniles was forbidden by the Constitutional Court in the 1995 case S v Williams. Corporal punishment in schools was banned by the South African Schools Act, 1996, and the application of that ban to private religious schools was upheld by the Constitutional Court in the case of Christian Education South Africa v Minister of Education.

In 2013, the Department of Social Development prepared legislation to prohibit corporal punishment in the home. In 2017 a decision by the Gauteng High Court held that corporal punishment in the home was unlawful, and that decision was confirmed for the whole country by the Constitutional Court in the 2019 case Freedom of Religion South Africa v Minister of Justice and Constitutional Development.

=== South Korea ===
In South Korea, until 2021, article 915 of the Civil Act 1958 provided adults the "right to take disciplinary action". Laws against violence and abuse were not generally interpreted as prohibiting corporal punishment of children. In January 2021, article 915 was fully repealed and South Korea become the 62nd country in the world to ban all kinds of corporal punishment against children.

=== Spain ===
All kinds of corporal punishment of children including "smacking" were banned by the 1st Zapatero government in December 2007. School corporal punishment had been prohibited in 1985 by another Social-Democratic government.

In June 2021, the Spanish Parliament passed a new, pioneering child and adolescent protection law against all kinds of violence or abuse. It was championed by the British-Spanish pianist James Rhodes and the left-wing party Unidas Podemos, but eventually supported by all political groups in Parliament except Vox. A Code of Minors is also being drafted.

=== Sweden ===
Sweden was the world's first nation to outlaw all corporal punishment of children in 1966, when the law that permitted parents to use corporal punishment of their children became removed and fully replaced with the constitution of assault under the Penal Code; however, even though the law no longer supported parents' right to use physical punishment of their children, it was believed to still be permitted (as there was no explicit ban). School corporal punishment was already banned since 1958.

On 1 July 1979, Sweden became the world's first nation to explicitly ban corporal punishment of children, through an amendment to the Parenthood and Guardianship Code which stated, "Children are entitled to care, security and a good upbringing. Children are to be treated with respect for their person and individuality and may not be subjected to corporal punishment or any other humiliating treatment." In Parliament - the law was supported 259 to 6 with 3 abstentions. Corporal punishment in Sweden is not seen as a separate legal issue - but is handled according to the criteria for assault.

One thing that helped pave the way for the ban was a 1971 murder case where a 3-year-old girl was beaten to death by her stepfather. The case shook the general public and preventing child abuse became a political hot topic for years to come.

It is estimated that approximately 5% of Swedish children continue to be illegally spanked, however, in addition to being unlawful, physical punishment of children is now considered socially unacceptable.

=== Switzerland ===
On September 26, 2025, both chambers of the Federal Assembly approved the inclusion of "non-violent parenting" in Swiss law. The law forbids "physical punishment and other forms of degrading treatment". The Federal Council is to decide at the beginning of 2026 when the new law start to take effect.

=== Turkey ===
==== Simple form ====
In Turkey, corporal punishment is unlawful, considered assault, and is punishable by imprisonment for a term not less than 1 year and not more than 3 years if none of the special cases below occur.

==== Special cases ====
If the courts deem that any one of:

- "the victim is physically or psychologically unable to defend themselves",
- the victim is the child of the perpetrator, or
- a weapon (which is defined to include "anything used in defense or offense") is used in the act is true, the punishment is increased by half of the original amount. If the courts deem that the perpetrator acted in a "fiendish" way, the punishment is increased to twice the original amount. If either one or both of these are true, it is said that the act was "egregious".

If the victim suffers, as a result of corporal punishment being used on them, any one of:

- persistent weakness in any of their senses or organs,
- persistent hardship in speaking,
- a permanent mark on their face, or
- a danger to their life,

the punishment determined above is increased to twice its final amount (determined above). However, the final punishment if these occur, cannot be less than imprisonment for a term of 3 years, or 5 years if the act was deemed to be "egregious".

Alternatively, if the victim, as a result of corporal punishment being used on them, any one of:

- begins to suffer from an illness for which there is no cure, or, enters a persistent vegetative state,
- suffers a complete loss of function to one of their senses or organs,
- loses the ability to speak or to reproduce, or
- a permanent change to their face,

the punishment determined above is increased to thrice its final amount (determined above). However, the final punishment if these occur, cannot be less than imprisonment for a term of 5 years, or 8 years if the act was deemed to be "egregious".

If the victim suffers a broken bone as a result of corporal punishment being used on them, the courts may increase the final punishment by up to half its original amount, depending on the vitality of the broken bone to daily life.

If the victim dies as a result of corporal punishment being used on them but the act does not meet the criteria for murder, the final punishment must be imprisonment for a term not less than 8 years and not more than 12 years. If the act was found to be "egregious", the term of imprisonment must be between 12 and 18 years.

=== United Kingdom ===
In the United Kingdom, the law regarding domestic corporal punishment varies by jurisdiction.

==== England and Wales ====
===== England =====
Criminal law has a general prohibition against common assault and battery, but corporal punishment is legal through tradition and an implicit common law justification/defence (R v Hopley 2F&F 202, 1860) to such charges for parents striking their children in the context of "lawful correction" where the act is "moderate and reasonable". The Children Act 2004 effectively provides a statutory definition of 'immoderate' by disallowing this justification for any act of punishment inflicting injuries or effects that amount to strangulation, wounding, actual bodily harm (ABH), or any act considered "cruelty to persons under sixteen" in violation of the Children and Young Persons Act 1933, and was described at implementation as criminalising "visible bruising" and rendering lesser injuries (comparable to "not serious" common assault) implicitly lawful/defensible. At the time, the Crown Prosecution Service (CPS) produced a charging standard unlawfully asserting the age of the victim may be considered an aggravating factor in deciding if the offence charged would be indefensible serious assault occasioning ABH rather than (implicitly defensible) common assault and erroneously asserted that any injuries more than "temporary reddening of the skin" or "marks" could be charged as ABH; this had no legal basis and was withdrawn in 2011. Standards now correctly require evidence of injuries that are "serious" and where a "sentence clearly in excess of six months' imprisonment ought to be available" (as legal precedent requires/demands injuries "must, no doubt, be more than merely transient and trifling" now being interpreted as "more than common assault") to warrant an indefensible criminal charge of ABH.

Utilising the unlawful threshold, the courts of England and Wales have convicted parents on the basis that their acts amounted to ABH and were therefore unlawful, yet have passed sentences less than six months, contrary to the requirement of more than six months; police and social services also continue to use the long-withdrawn assertions of the CPS, leading to some parents or others acting in loco parentis being criminalised (often by police cautions for lesser common assault on a position of guilt to ABH) or investigated for causing minor injuries that did not amount to ABH in law.

The total abolition of corporal punishment has been discussed. In a 2004 poll by the advocacy group Children are Unbeatable!, 71% of respondents supported giving children the same protection against battery as adults if it "would not lead to parents being prosecuted for trivial or minor acts of physical punishment". In a 2006 survey, 80% of the population said they believed in smacking, and 73% said that they believed that any ban would cause a sharp deterioration in children's behaviour. Seven out of ten parents said they themselves use corporal punishment. In a 2012 poll conducted by Angus Reid Public Opinion, 63% of Britons voiced opposition to banning parents in the UK from smacking their children.

===== Wales =====
The Welsh Government introduced a Bill to abolish the defence of reasonable punishment in Wales. On 20 March 2020 the Welsh Assembly passed the Children (Abolition of Defence of Reasonable Punishment) (Wales) Act 2020. This change in the law gives children the same legal protection from assault as adults. On 21 March 2022 the “smacking ban” came into force in Wales, making corporal punishment of children officially illegal.

==== Scotland ====
In Scotland, since 2003 it has been unlawful to punish a child using any implement, or to strike them upon the head and corporal punishment of children under the age of 3 is unlawful.

In 2017, the Scottish Government confirmed it would support a member's bill to ban all corporal punishment completely. In 2019, the Scottish Parliament passed the Children (Equal Protection from Assault) (Scotland) Act 2019, parts of which commenced immediately, while other parts commenced 1 year later.

==== Northern Ireland ====
In Northern Ireland, laws regarding corporal punishment are similar to England. It is unlawful to hit a child upon the head or use an implement.

==== Jersey ====
In Jersey, corporal punishment was banned in 2020 by the passage of the Children and Education (Amendment) (Jersey) Law 2020.

=== United States ===
Corporal punishment of children by parents is legal to some extent in all fifty of the United States, and is explicitly legal according to the state laws of all 50 states. Social acceptance is generally high, through allowances made for "moderate physical discipline" (using this or similar language) in most states' laws regarding assault, criminal battery, domestic violence or child abuse. Whether an instance of corporal punishment exceeds these bounds is usually decided on a case-by-case basis in family court proceedings.

=== Zimbabwe ===
In 2014, the High Court of Harare ruled that corporal punishment violated the Constitution of Zimbabwe in all settings, with the Court calling for the Constitutional Court to confirm its decision. In 2017, Zimbabwe's High Court ruled that child corporal punishment in both the home and at school was unconstitutional, however, the Constitutional Court has not confirmed this judgement.

Article 241 of the Criminal Law (Codification and Reform) Act 2004 authorises “moderate corporal punishment” of children by parents, guardians and schoolteachers; article 7 of the Children's Act 1972 confirms the right of parents and guardians to “administer reasonable punishment”.

== See also ==
- Corporal punishment in the home
- School corporal punishment
- Spanking
