= Shepherding a Child's Heart =

1995 book by Tedd Tripp

- Author: Tedd Tripp
- Language: English
- Publication date: 1995
- Publication place: United States

Shepherding a Child's Heart is a 1995 book by American pastor Tedd Tripp about parenting, with a particular focus on advantages of discipline, including spanking.

The book has been described as one of the most popular Christian parenting books and required reading at many Christian parenting courses. Due to its recommendations of spanking as a God-endorsed parental technique, the book has raised some controversy in the United States and abroad, for example for promoting spanking as a useful technique even for infants under one year.

== Background ==
Tedd Tripp is the pastor of Grace Fellowship Church in Hazle Township, Pennsylvania. He received a bachelor's degree from Geneva College and a master's degree from the Reformed Episcopal Seminary, before studying pastoral counseling at Westminster Theological Seminary from 1985 onwards. He received a Doctor of Ministry degree from Westminster in 1990, having written a book-length project entitled Parenting: Shepherding a Child's Heart.

== Reception and controversy ==
The book has been described as one of the most popular Christian parenting books and required reading at many Christian parenting courses.

In 2008 in Seattle a speech by the book author has caused local protests.

In January 2020 the Polish translation of the book (Pasterz serca dziecka) has attracted critique in Poland, including from the Polish Children Ombudsman Mikołaj Pawlak, with a number of media publications criticizing the book for promoting child abuse. The small publishing house Słowo Prawdy affiliated with the Baptist Union of Poland which is responsible for the Polish translation declared that it is immediately if temporarily halting the sales of the book pending further analysis, and it is considering withdrawing the book from the Polish market. A week later, the book was withdrawn from the market.

== See also ==
- Child corporal punishment laws
- Corporal punishment in the home
