= Litherland High School =

Location
- Sterrix Lane; Litherland, Merseyside, L21 0DB; England; 53.4804°N 2.9861°W

Information
- Type: Academy
- Motto: Together in the Business of Learning
- Established: 1948
- Local authority: Sefton
- Department for Education URN: 141694 Tables
- Ofsted: Reports
- Principal: Claire Hallwood
- Gender: Coeducational
- Age: 11 to 16
- Enrolment: 739 (2024)
- Website: http://www.litherland-high.sefton.sch.uk/

Litherland High School is a secondary school in Litherland, Merseyside, England, headed by Principal Mrs Claire Hallwood since 2024. The school was established in March 1948 as the first post-war school to be built in Lancashire, costing £116,000 (equivalent to £4.78 million in 2024). The school made news headlines in 1981 with accusations of excessive corporal punishment, with reports of over 1,800 slipperings occurring over the preceding four terms up to February 1981.

Litherland High School was listed as a school requiring 'Special Measures' by a February 2014 Ofsted inspection. In March 2015 the school converted to academy status. It is part of the Litherland Partnership which includes local primary schools.

Over the 2022 summer holidays, the school merged buildings with Litherland Moss Primary School, with the renovations lasting months.

== Original school history ==
=== Construction ===
The school was the first post-war secondary to be built in what was then the county of Lancashire, estimated to cost around £116,000 (equivalent to £5,159,700 in 2024). Planned to include a model flat, science laboratories and open-air teaching spaces, the first foundation stone was laid by Sir James Aitken, chairman of Lancashire County Council. Designed by county architect Noel Hill, the school ultimately cost £249,000 to construct and became the first large school to be built in Lancashire after World War II and utilised modern methods of construction to achieve a simple design. The most expensive elements were the mandated construction of a brick wall along the boundary of the adjoining convent and a sewer system around 0.25 miles (0.40 km) long.

The foundations were laid in July 1947. Originally scheduled to be open by December 1947 as a 450 intake girls-only secondary modern, the school included an assembly hall, dining room, kitchen and staff blocks, among 10 classrooms facing south-east. Special mention was given to the stage and lighting equipment, which was described as being capable of "staging plays by repertory companies". The boiler house was situated beneath the stage and was described as being "one of the most up to date in the country" upon the school's opening.

=== Opening ===
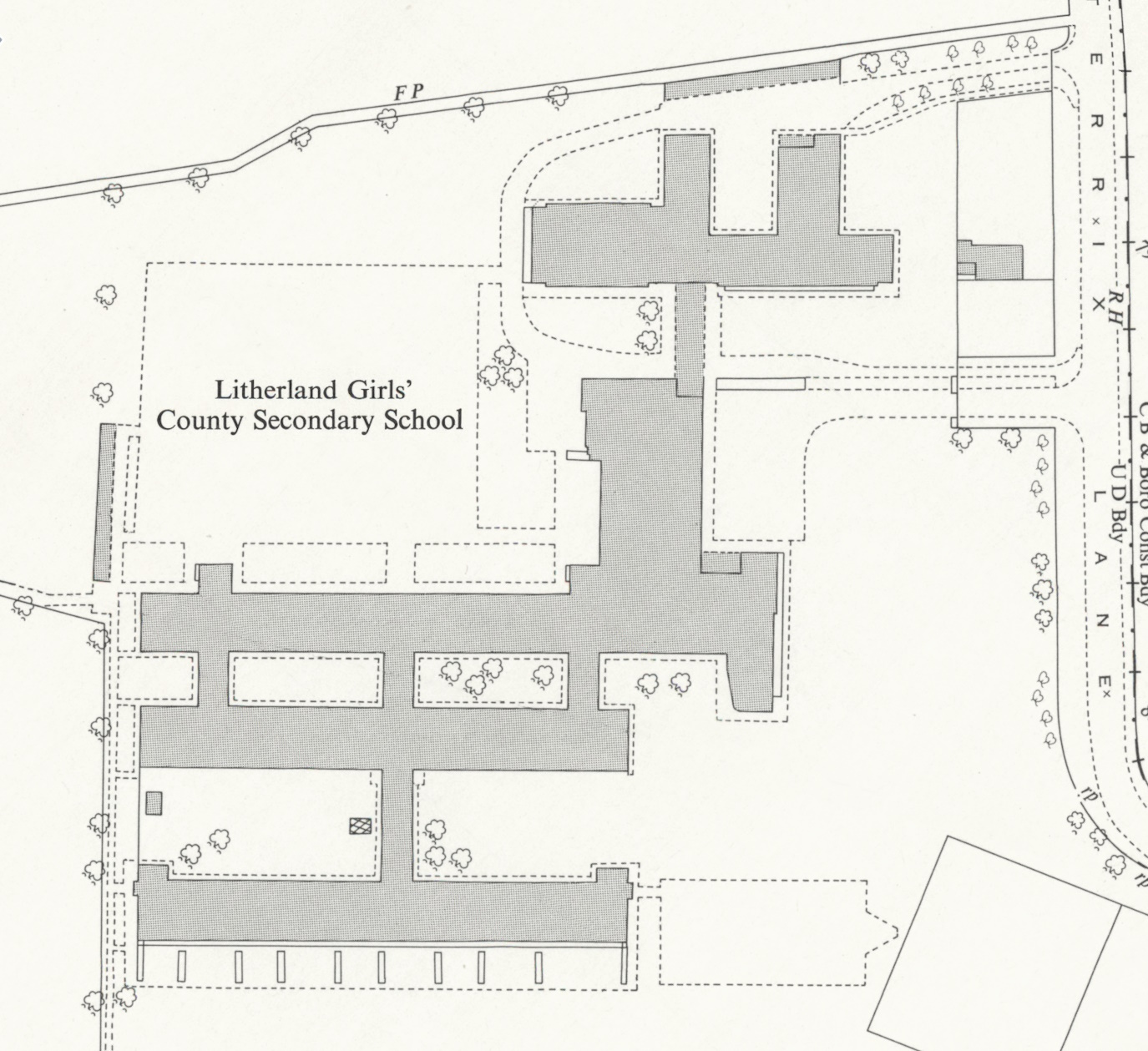
School layout of Litherland Girls Secondary School as of 1958

The school was formally opened by the chairman of Lancashire Education Committee, Sir Henry Hancock, in February 1950 as Litherland Secondary Modern School for Girls. The school had been operational since April 1948, as it was built in two phases. Designed to facilitate over 500 girls, it was constructed on a 27.88 acres (11.28 ha) site using a steel frame, with a brick fascia and aluminium roofs. The first headmistress was Miss Jackson.

=== Corporal punishment scandal ===
The school gained national attention in 1981 due to allegations of excessive corporal punishment, with over 1,800 instances of slippering reported in the four terms leading up to February of that year. Allan Roberts, then Member of Parliament for Bootle, remarked that in the school, "violence, institutionalised in the way that it is, seems to be the norm rather than the exception".

The controversy began when teacher Alan Corkish publicly disclosed the school's punishment record, leading to his summons for a disciplinary hearing, which instigated protests by students in his support. In a televised BBC interview with The Oxford Road Show, Corkish justified his whistleblowing, revealing that corporal punishment was frequently used for minor infractions, often as a first response. He noted that many staff members were unaware of the extent of these punishments, with only a few colleagues opposing the practice. Despite a 200-strong student walkout in support of Corkish in which the police were called, he was dismissed several months later without payment during his suspension period. His appeal to Sefton Council was unsuccessful, prompting him to consider taking his case to the High Court. Ultimately, Corkish won his case at the Court of Appeal, with a ruling that Sefton Council had mishandled his dismissal. Supported by the National Union of Teachers, Corkish was awarded legal costs and expressed his eagerness to return to teaching elsewhere. Corkish was subsequently again dismissed due to claims of misconduct and an appeal against the decision failed in November 1983.

In response to the scandal, headteacher Eric Colley, who had originally introduced the slipper to replace the cane, proposed reinstating the cane in April 1981 to curb the use of slippering. By July, four teachers had been suspended. The school, labelled the "slipper school" by the Liverpool Echo, was promised a £100,000 cash injection to help it recover, with educational authorities indicating expenditure on redecoration and modernisation to improve the school's image. The cost was ultimately over £350,000, attributed to the speed of improvements demanded by local councillors. The local education authority reported that other services may have been impacted to finance the work.

In October 1981, a new headteacher, Gerald Banks, was appointed to lead the 1,000-pupil school, to start in January 1982. He was previously the headteacher of Bridgefield Comprehensive School in Halewood and although supported corporal punishment, said he hoped it would not be required.

=== Later history ===
In 1986, the school's sixth form was threatened with closure, to instead replaced by tertiary colleges at Hugh Baird College and Southport College respectively. The governors opposed the proposals and parents were hostile to the prospect of losing the sixth form, believing it would deprive children and their parents the choice of where they have their further education. Headmaster Gerald Banks accepted that falling rolls had meant that there were fewer students taking A-level courses, but appealed for more information about what Hugh Baird College could offer as an alternative. The council argued that projected pupil numbers heading into the 1990s meant that changes had to be made to deal with the "unacceptably small" numbers of students in Bootle, Litherland and Crosby sixth form centres.

In 1991, Jim Donnelly took up the post of headteacher, reportedly inheriting issues of poor staff morale, inadequate facilities and low standards. Just under half of the students at the time were eligible for free school meals and the area had high unemployment levels. Donnelly prioritised improvements to the school's environment and morale, with significant investment in computing resources. His efforts were recognised by Ofsted in 1998, who noted the school as an example for other schools to aspire to.

The school was badly damaged in October 1997 when a fire, thought to have started in a woodwork workshop, was believed to have been started by arsonists. In February 2002, the school was awarded its specialist status as a 'Languages' college, with an assurance of £500,000 being spent over the following four years to enhance the language teaching facilities.

== New school building ==
The Liverpool Echo reported in October 2006 that Sefton Council had been awarded government funding to build a new school, which would merge with Bootle High School, mainly due to falling intake numbers particularly at Bootle High School, with proposals for a sixth form to be constructed on the Netherton site. Approval for the project was delayed due to an objection raised with regards to the closure of Bootle High School, although indications had been made that the DfES had approved Sefton's plan.

A meeting held at the Town Hall, Bootle in May 2007 indicated the project to cost approximately £22.4m, with the new higher capacity Litherland High School to take effect from 1 September 2009. All pupils at Bootle High School were guaranteed a place at the new Litherland High School.

In September 2009, over 400 new students started at the school, mostly from Bootle High School and the rest as new Year 7 intake. The school was recognised as the most improved in the borough when a report in January 2010 noted the percentage of students achieving five GCSEs inclusive of English and Maths increasing from 23% to 44%. However, less than five years later in February 2014, Ofsted judged the school to be inadequate, a reduction on grading from its previous "outstanding" grading. Ofsted highlighted declining achievement, inconsistent marking and high absence and exclusion rates
