= Legality of corporal punishment =

Legality of corporal punishment may refer to

- Child corporal punishment laws
- Judicial corporal punishment
