= Freedom of Religion South Africa =

South African Christian lobbying group

- Formation: January 2014; 12 years ago
- Founder: Andrew Selley
- Registration no.: K2014099286
- Legal status: Nonprofit organisation
- Website: www.forsa.org.za

Freedom of Religion South Africa (FOR SA) is a South African nonprofit fundamentalist Christian advocacy group. It was founded in 2014 by Andrew Selley, the lead pastor and founder of the Joshua Generation Church, after parents filed a complaint to the South African Human Rights Commission that alleged that Joshua Generation Church advocated for corporal punishment in the home. In Freedom of Religion South Africa v Minister of Justice and Constitutional Development, FOR SA unsuccessfully opposed a ruling by the Johannesburg High Court that deemed corporal punishment to be assault.

FOR SA is dedicated to "upholding the rights to religious freedom conferred by the South African Constitution, including parental rights and the autonomy of religious organisations to determine their own doctrines and regulate their own internal affairs free from interference by the State or anyone else". It has also advocated against the expansion of LGBT rights and opposed the implementation of comprehensive sex education in South African schools on the grounds of religious freedom.

== History ==
In October 2013, two parents found a parenting manual on Joshua Generation Church's website that gave instructions on how to administer corporal punishment to children. The manual gave specific instructions on the size of the rod that should be used to hit children as well as instruction on how to hit children without leaving marks. The parents filed a complaint with the South African Human Rights Commission (SAHRC) shortly thereafter. In response to the complaint and the subsequent investigation of Joshua Generation Church by the SAHRC, Andrew Selley, founder and lead pastor of the church, founded FOR SA in January 2014. In 2016, the SAHRC concluded its investigation and released a report that recommended that Joshua Generation Church undertake to stop advocating for corporal punishment, remove references to corporal punishment from its teaching materials, and ensuring its pastors take a training course in non-violent child discipline. It also recommended that corporal punishment of children be outlawed.

== Advocacy ==
=== Corporal punishment ===
In 2017, a man who beat his son and was convicted of assault in the Johannesburg Regional Court, appealed his conviction in the Johannesburg High Court. The man argued that the common law concept of "reasonable chastisement" allowed parents to administer discipline in a matter that the parent deems reasonable. FOR SA made representations in defence of "reasonable chastisement" to the court as an amicus curiae. FOR SA argued that reasonable chastisement only allows reasonable levels of physical discipline that are not comparable to abuse and that reasonable chastisement is not an unjustifiable breach of the rights of the child and therefore was compatible with the South African Constitution. FOR SA also added that because scriptures commanded that parents should reasonably discipline their children, sometimes physically, declaring reasonable chastisement unlawful would violate parents' religious freedoms. The court ruled that the reasonable chastisement defence was unconstitutional, effectively outlawing corporal punishment in South Africa.

In 2019, FOR SA appealed the 2017 High Court ruling that made corporal punishment unlawful at the Constitutional Court of South Africa, again arguing that scriptures and other holy writings instruct parents to discipline their children in a matter they find appropriate. The court again ruled that the common law idea of reasonable chastisement was incompatible with several sections of the South African Constitution, namely sections 10, 12(1(c), and 28(2).

=== LGBT issues ===
FOR SA claims that the right to freedom from discrimination does not override the freedom of religion and that in some instances, some discrimination may be justified in order to avoid infringing on the freedom of religion. FOR SA has frequently used this argument to support the rights of religious people in cases where they have come into conflict with the rights of LGBT people. In 2014, FOR SA acted as amicus curiae on the side of two guesthouse owners in Wolseley who were sued by a gay couple after the guesthouse refused to offer them accommodation on religious grounds. The guesthouse owners claimed that providing a place for a homosexual couple to have sex would make them liable for sin. In 2015, FOR SA acted as the official spokesperson for the vice-chairperson of the University of Cape Town's students' representative council (SRC), Zizipho Pae, after the SRC voted to remove her from the council for a Facebook post she made criticising the United States Supreme Court decision which guaranteed the right to marry to same-sex couples. Pae was later reinstated when the university found that the SRC decision to remove her did not follow the correct procedure. Selley said the decision to reinstate her was a victory for religious freedom and should cause politicians and activists to "lose confidence in the brashness of driving gay rights forward". In 2019, FOR SA spoke in support of a pastor who allegedly told high school students that gay people were akin to murderers and paedophiles and "just as bad as Hitler". FOR SA executive director Michael Swain said that South Africa's constitution allowed religious sermons in schools and that the constitutional right to free speech included speech that some might find offensive. He added that speech that constitutes incitement to cause harm is not constitutionally protected. The pastor denied making the claims. In January 2020, FOR SA also spoke out in support of a wedding venue in Stanford who refused to allow a lesbian couple to celebrate their wedding there.

In 2020, FOR SA asked president Cyril Ramaphosa not to sign the Civil Union Amendment bill which would repeal section 6 of the Civil Union Act, no longer allowing state-employed marriage officers to refuse to validate a same-sex marriage. FOR SA argued that the repeal of section 6 would violate the religious freedoms of state-employed marriage officers and that the bill should be sent back to parliament for review. Section 6 of the act provided that:

A marriage officer, other than a marriage officer referred to in section 5, may in writing inform the Minister [of Home Affairs] that he or she objects on the ground of conscience, religion and belief to solemnising a civil union between persons of the same sex, whereupon that marriage officer shall not be compelled to solemnise such civil union.

The bill was signed into law by President Ramaphosa on 22 October 2020, giving rise to the Civil Union Amendment Act of 2020.
