= Castigation =

Infliction of severe punishment

Castigation (from the Latin castigatio) or chastisement (via the French châtiment) is the infliction of severe (moral or corporal) punishment. One who administers a castigation is a castigator or chastiser.

According to an etymology recorded by Thomas Aquinas, castigation specifically meant restoring one to a religiously pure state, called chastity. In ancient Rome, castigatio censoria could refer to actions by the magistrate called a censor (in the original sense, rather than the later politicized evolution), who castigated in the name of the pagan state religion but with the authority of the 'pious' state.

Christianity adopted this terminology but roughly restricted it to the physical sphere: chastity became a matter of approved sexual conduct, castigation usually meaning physical punishment, either as a form of penance, as a voluntary pious exercise (see mortification of the flesh) or as educational or other coercion, while the use for other (e.g. verbal) punishments (and criticism etc.) is now often perceived as metaphorical.

Self-castigation is applied by the repentant culprit to himself, for moral and/or religious reasons, notably as penance.

== See also ==
- Capital punishment
- Corporal punishment
- Chastisement
