= Bradford Christian School =

Independent school in Bradford, West Yorkshire, England

Location
- Livingstone Road; Bolton Woods; Bradford, West Yorkshire, BD2 1BT; England; 53.81982°N 1.76038°W

Information
- Type: Independent school
- Religious affiliation: Christian
- Established: 1993
- Founders: Philip Moon & Audrey Moon
- Local authority: City of Bradford
- Department for Education URN: 107461 Tables
- Ofsted: Reports
- Headmistress: Jane Prothero
- Gender: Coeducational
- Age: 3 to 16
- Enrolment: 139
- Capacity: 225
- Website: bradfordchristianschool.com

Bradford Christian School is a private school situated in Bradford, West Yorkshire, England. It has a pre-school, primary, middle and upper school, and takes pupils from the age of 3 to 16 years old. It has been in operation since 1993.

== School performance ==
The school was inspected by Ofsted in 2016 and judged Inadequate. It was inspected again in 2018 and judged Good.

In 2023, the percentage of children at the school achieving GCSEs in English and maths at grade 5 or above was 50%, compared to 36% in Bradford as a whole and 45% nationally.

== Challenge of Corporal punishment ban in schools ==
In 2002 the school was one of a group of Christian schools which challenged the ban on corporal punishment in UK schools, citing Proverbs Chapter 23:13–14: "Do not withhold discipline from a child; if you punish him with the rod, he will not die", but their case, R. (on the application of Williamson) v Secretary of State for Education and Employment, was rejected by the Law Lords in 2005.

== Charity Commission inquiry ==
In 2014 the Charity Commission published an Inquiry into the school, as one of a number of "charities that were in default of their statutory obligations to meet reporting requirements by failing to file their annual documents for two or more years in the last five years", had been given a final warning and were still in default. The report stated that the school's trustees response had been "whilst they had failed to submit accounts on time the charity was still functioning as a successful organisation, the trustees were keen to put things right and would not allow the situation to happen again".
