= Slippering =

Type of corporal punishment

Slippering is the term to describe the act of spanking the buttocks with the sole of a slipper, slide, or plimsoll. The verb "to slipper" means "to give a slippering".

A slippering results in a sharp stinging from the immediate impact, followed (especially with cumulative strokes) by a sensation of the buttocks feeling warm. The stinging and redness brought about are relatively brief, but mild discomfort can linger anywhere from a few minutes to up to an hour depending on: the number of strokes, the speed at which the strokes are administered, the intensity of the strokes, and the recipient's pain tolerance. Both the carpet slipper and the plimsoll are similar in their use and general effects, albeit with the plimsoll being the firmer of the two. Slippering is generally considered a less intense form of spanking compared to the likes of paddling, tawsing, and caning.

Slipperings are particularly associated with Britain and Commonwealth countries (although not exclusively so), and with corporal punishment in both the home and education.

Slippering can be done consensually as part of erotic spanking.

== History ==
Until at least the 1970s, slippering was widely used by British parents as a means of punishing children and adolescents. There has been very little data, research or evidence compiled about the use of slippering. Information is mainly based on anecdotal reports from individuals who have given, received, or observed slipperings, or who have been in households or schools where slipperings were used. Slippering as a means of punishing children and adolescents has been historically common in Latin American, South Asian and West Asian cultures.

== School slippering ==
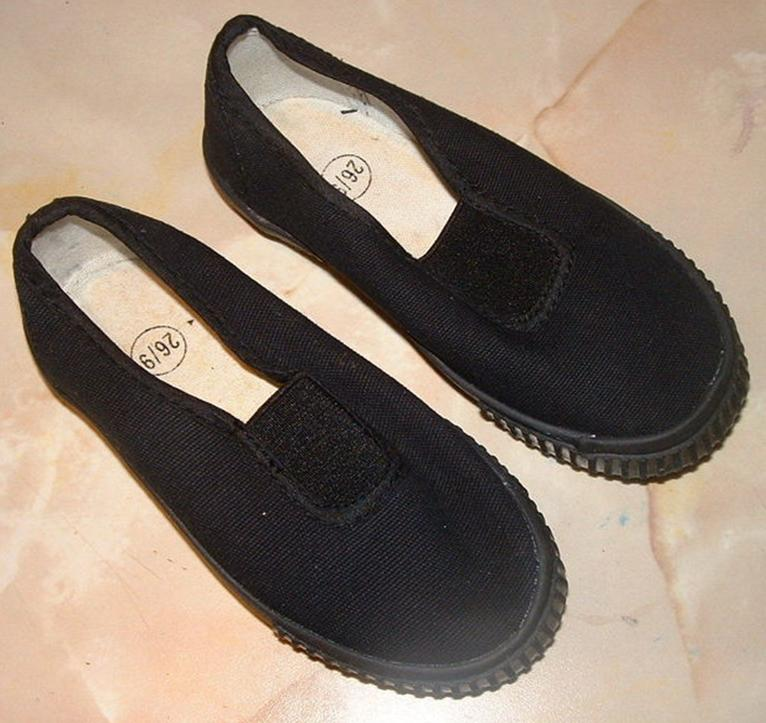
School plimsolls or "slippers"

In the United Kingdom, especially in England and Wales, the slipper was a common implement for administering corporal punishment in schools for students of both genders and all ages. In schools that used the cane as the ultimate penalty, the slipper was seen as a less severe alternative for punishing less serious misconduct. In some mixed schools, the slipper was used on girls and the cane was reserved for boys.

"Slipper" is a misnomer, as the usual item of footwear used was the plimsoll, dap or gym shoe or tennis shoe, with a fabric upper and a heavy rubber or synthetic sole. This could deliver a very painful stroke, depending on the force with which it was used, and the size and flexibility of the particular slipper; a size 11, well-worn, flexible slipper would deliver more sting than one that was new and stiff. Though not a slipper in the usual sense of the term, in England the implement used was invariably referred to as "the slipper" by teachers and pupils alike, presumably on account of its similarity to the type of carpet slipper used for parental punishments.

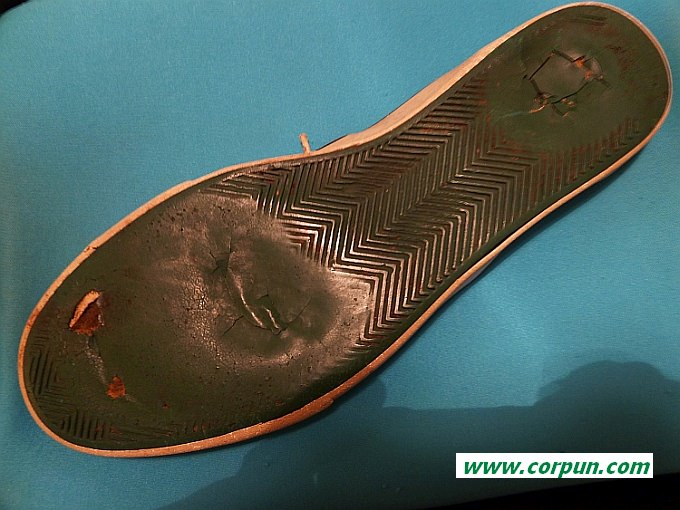
Gym shoe

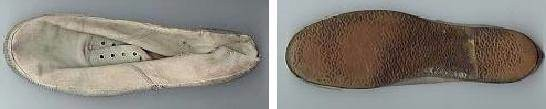
School gym shoe

The slipper was also widely used to enforce discipline outside lesson time within the boarding houses of boarding schools, especially preparatory schools. This "informal", on-the-spot type of discipline was typically not recorded in the official punishment register, as it was not seen as sufficiently serious to be classified as real corporal punishment. It could also be administered by staff who were not officially authorised to administer formal corporal punishment, i.e. the cane.

A minority of schools also designated the slipper as their official punishment implement instead of the cane for more serious misbehaviour, especially infractions committed outside the classroom, such as smoking. In this case, slipperings were carried out as a formal ceremony in the same way as canings at other schools, i.e. the student would be summoned to the private office of the Head Teacher (principal) or Deputy Head or of a senior teacher of the same gender as the student.

An example of a school that opted for the slipper as its formal disciplinary implement was Litherland High School near Liverpool, a mixed-sex school, although the policy there was that only boys could receive corporal discipline. The school recorded more than 1,800 official slipperings in 1980. Another school where the slipper was in regular use was the King's School, Macclesfield. At that boys' grammar school in Cheshire slipperings were administered in the classroom in a solemn, formal atmosphere. Boys aged between 11 and 16 were required to bend over and received up to 12 hard whacks on the seat of the trousers. The punishment, which was extremely painful, was the standard response to a wide variety of disciplinary offences, including failing end-of-term tests.

More typical, in that the cane was the "official" punishment, and slippering routinely used more informally, was Highbury Grove School, then a large boys' school in north London.

All forms of corporal punishment were banned in state schools in the UK in 1987. A ban in private schools followed in England and Wales (1999), Scotland (2000), and Northern Ireland (2003).

== Popular culture ==
The routine nature of such punishment is demonstrated by the frequency with which comics of the day (e.g., The Beano and The Dandy) showed scenes in which characters such as Dennis the Menace, Roger the Dodger, Minnie the Minx and Beryl the Peril were slippered by an irate parent.

Ishmael, a fictional character in Herman Melville's Moby-Dick, recalled, in chapter four of the novel, begging his stepmother for the favor of receiving from her "a good slippering" for his misbehaviour.
