= Jordan Riak =

American activist against corporal punishment

- Born: January 11, 1935; Dover, New Jersey
- Died: April 2016 (aged 81); Alamo, California

Jordan Riak (January 11, 1935 – April 2016) was a teacher and activist against corporal punishment who drafted the 1986 bill which banned corporal punishment from public schools in California.

== Early life ==
Riak was born January 11, 1935, in, Dover, New Jersey. He was a native of nearby Morristown.

== Family ==
Riak was married to Anne Riak. Riak had three children, Oren Riak, Justin Riak, and Veketa.

== Career and activism ==
Riak began working against corporal punishment when he was residing with his children in Sydney, Australia and he was appalled to find out that corporal punishment was practiced in the Australian school system.

Moving to California, he incorporated PTAVE there, and with Assemblymen Sam Farr, successfully introduced legislation to end corporal punishment in schools in California in 1987, making it the ninth state to do so.

Riak's ultimate goal was to turn the United States into a spanking-free nation.

Riak worked with David and Blythe Daniel, psychology professors who teach at Los Angeles City College. The Daniels, who advocate children's rights through the We the Children Foundation and through education and workshops, campaigned with Riak for an anti-spanking resolution by the Los Angeles City Council, because "Spanking communicates to everyone that children have no rights, that they don't get the respect that other human beings get, and it's horrible," David Daniel said.

Riak believed that neither the responsible parenting of children nor the responsible teaching of children should involve violence.

Riak was the executive director of Parents and Teachers Against Violence in Education from 1992 until his death in 2016.

== Death ==
Riak died in April 2016 at the age of 81 in Alamo, California.

== Other attributions ==
The character William Jordan Walcott in Blake Hutchison's 2016 novel Nobody's Property is named partially in honor of Riak. It is additionally implied in the novel that the woman Will calls "mom" is ardently opposed to corporal punishment, was a staunch supporter of Riak, and was even photographed with Riak at one point in the 1990s.

Riak Park in the fictional city of Luna Vista, California in the Nobody's Property fiction series is also named in honor of him.
