= Freedom of Religion South Africa v Minister of Justice and Constitutional Development =

South African legal case

- Court: Constitutional Court of South Africa
- Full case name: Freedom of Religion South Africa v Minister of Justice and Constitutional Development and Others
- Decided: 18 September 2019
- Citation: [2019] ZACC 34

Case history
- Prior action: YG v S [2017] ZAGPJHC 290
- Appealed from: High Court, Gauteng Local Division, Johannesburg

Court membership
- Judges sitting: Mogoeng CJ, Basson AJ, Cameron J, Dlodlo AJ, Froneman J, Goliath AJ, Khampepe J, Mhlantla J, Petse AJ and Theron J

Case opinions
- Decision by: Mogoeng

Keywords
- corporal punishment in the home, children's rights

Freedom of Religion South Africa v Minister of Justice and Constitutional Development and Others [2019] ZACC 34 is a decision of the Constitutional Court of South Africa which found that corporal punishment in the home is illegal. The court found that the common law defence of "moderate and reasonable chastisement" is unconstitutional, so that parents are no longer exempt from prosecution or conviction for assault for striking their children. The unanimous judgment was written by Chief Justice Mogoeng Mogoeng and handed down on 18 September 2019.

Reactions to the decision were mixed. Freedom of Religion South Africa, the Christian lobbying group which had been party to the case, described the decision as "dangerous" and "destructive". It was welcomed by children's rights groups including Save the Children South Africa and the Children's Institute at the University of Cape Town, as well as by the Department of Social Development.

== See also ==
- Christian Education South Africa v Minister of Education
