= R (Williamson) v Secretary of State for Education and Employment =

R. (on the application of Williamson) v Secretary of State for Education and Employment; UKHL 15 [2005] 2 A.C. 246, was an unsuccessful challenge to the prohibition of school corporal punishment in the Education Act 1996 by the headmasters of private Christian schools in the United Kingdom.

== Facts ==
The heads of a number of Christian private schools - Philip Williamson, Michael Bates, Grahame Davies, David Greenwood, Marianne Hosey, Paul Hubbard, Philip Moon, Anthony Seaton, and Matthew Walker - wished to use corporal punishment as a disciplinary device in their schools. The schools were Christian Fellowship School at Edge Hill, Liverpool, Bradford Christian School at Idle, Bradford, Cornerstone School at Epsom, Surrey, and King's School at Eastleigh, Hampshire. They claimed that the prohibition of corporal punishment in the Education Act 1996 s.548 was a breach of their freedom of religion under Article 9 ECHR. They failed in their claim in the Administrative Court (Elias J), in the Court of Appeal. They tried again on appeal to the House of Lords. They were represented by Paul Diamond and James Dingemans QC

== Judgment ==
The House of Lords held unanimously that there was a big difference between freedom of religious belief and freedom to manifest that belief. Any interference was deemed justified, "necessary in a democratic society... for the protection of rights and freedoms for others".

== See also ==
- Human Rights Act 1998
