= Rebenque =

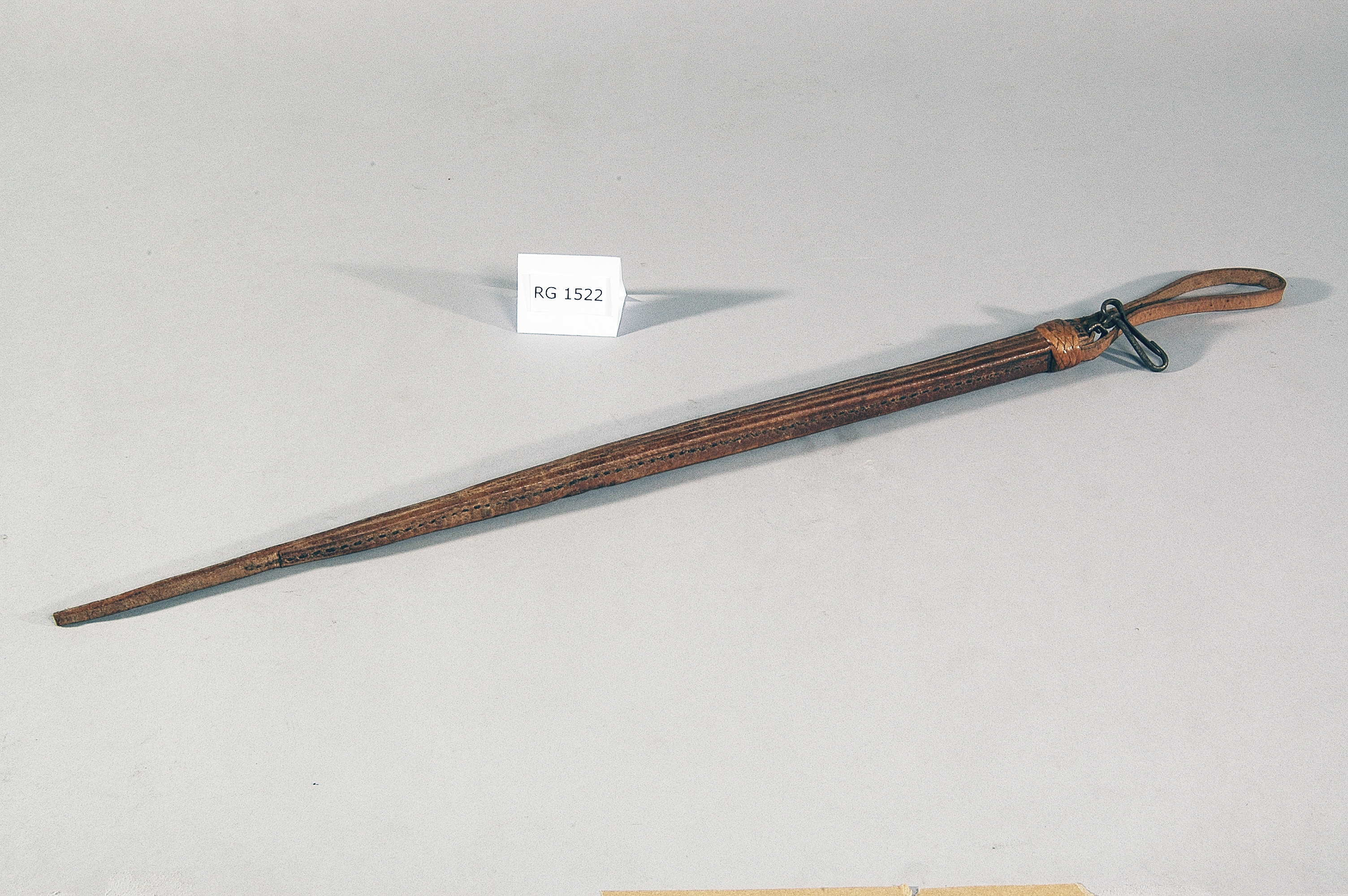
The Rebenque is part of the collection of the Museu do Ipiranga, also known as the “Museu do Ipiranga”, in São Paulo, Brazil.

Rebenque is the shared name in South American Spanish and Brazilian Portuguese for a type of whip used by gauchos in South America.

The word derives from the French raban, Dutch ra-band, from ra 'yard-beam' + band. Originally it was the rope that ties the sail to the yard, but soon came to mean a whip made of leather or tarred hemp, used to punish sailors (compare rope's end).

Especially in Argentina, it is the traditional riding, fighting, and punishing whip of the gaucho (the Argentine, Uruguayan and Southern Brazilian cowboy). It consists of a rawhide wrapped wooden handle about 0.5 metres (20 in) long with a thong made of a 5 centimetres (2.0 in) wide rawhide strap a little longer than the handle. The handle is topped by a knob, and have a wrist strap. It can be embellished with gold and silver.

== Types ==
The basic rebenque is composed of a rawhide covered wooden handle 30–50 centimetres (0.98–1.64 ft) long, and differently from other riding whips, a rawhide strap about 3–5 centimetres (1.2–2.0 in) wide and a little longer than the handle. The strap can be double, sewn at the edges, and could have the point unsown, for making a slapper. It has a wrist strap at the top of the handle.

The wide strap made the rebenque an instrument less severe on the horse than the European riding crop.

As the gaucho was never far from the horse, the rebenque was always on him. When not in use, he made a knot with the strap and held the rebenque lazily by the wrist strap with the middle fingers of his hand, or hung it from the handle of his facón knife (as he used the large knife almost horizontally at his back, held by the belt or waistband, the handle protruded from his right side). The rebenque was used also for fighting, as a weapon by itself, when the fight did not merit a knife, or with the strap rolled on his left hand and the handle hanging, as a secondary weapon to the knife in his right hand.

Of course, it was also used for domestic punishments, and for quasi-judicial chastisement (corporal punishments were outlawed in Argentina, at least in the books, from 1813 on, but the country was very large, sparsely populated and not totally under government control, not unlike the American West). A couple of lashes with the rebenque on the bare legs were widely used as a punishment for children, even in the urban areas.

As an equestrian culture, not only the poor gauchos used the rebenque, and there were (and still are) elaborate versions, with silver knobs and ferrules for the ranch owners (estancieros) and prominent citizens.

Besides the common rebenque described above, there were several other types.

- Rebenque de argolla (Spanish) (Argentina) is a short handled rebenque with a large ring ("argolla" in Spanish) for holding it. The strap is very wide and a little longer than the handle plus the ring.
- Talero is a cheap rebenque, perhaps the original, with the wooden handle uncovered
- Guacha (in Brazil mango) with a short and very thick handle of lightwood, and a very wide strap is used for breaking in horses. Being less severe and noisier than the regular rebenque, it can be generously used on the animal, scaring it without actual damage.
- Work rebenque had a handle simply covered with the leather of a cow tail.
- The arreador (literally "for herding"), also arriador, in Brazil also enchiqueirador or relhador, is originally the whip used to drive cattle. As a symbol of authority for prominent persons, a costly and elaborate baton version was used, as various staffs in other cultures. To its handle, about two feet long, when made as a symbol, of fine wood with silver or golden ferrules, topped by a carved silver or gold head in the form of an animal head, or other figure, as on walking canes, a round braided leather thong of about two to three feet was attached. The handle ended in a ferrule (also silver or gold) with a ring, to which the thong—was attached which had also a ring at its point, to which it was attached a short leather fall, with a total length between a yard and 10 feet (3.0 m).
- Cola de tatú (in Brazil, rabo-de-tatú), literally it means “armadillo tail” (the old Gauchos hunted this animal to eat and use the carapace to protect his knees when horseback, and tail as a dangerous tip of the whip, today armadillo is protect by law) is a short whip with the handle covered in a special braiding called “caracol” (snail), becoming a thin braided thong, finished by a short fall.
- Chasquero (from the Quechua chasqui 'messenger') has a hollowed handle to hide letters, or a blade, like some gentlemen's walking canes.
- Lagarto (literally "lizard"), for driving the horse teams in a coach, was just a long tapering braided leather whip, with handle nor fall, but could hurt very severely.
- Polca (Córdoba province, Argentina) has a longer and thinner handle than the talero, sometimes made with a piece of iron, covered with a rawhide cow leather or braided thin rawhide strips
- Rebenque de Argolla 'Ring Rebenque' has a large metal ring (in Spanish “argolla”) instead of the wrist strap. The strap used to be wider than in the common rebenque.
