= Chastisement =

Infliction of corporal punishment as defined by law

Chastisement is the infliction of corporal punishment as defined by law.

== Minors ==
English common law allowed parents and others who have "lawful control or charge" of a child to use "moderate and reasonable" chastisement or correction. In the 1860 Eastbourne manslaughter case, Alexander Cockburn as Chief Justice ruled: "By the law of England, a parent ... may for the purpose of correcting what is evil in the child, inflict moderate and reasonable corporal punishment, always, however, with this condition, that it is moderate and reasonable." It was left to the courts to decide what is meant by "moderate and reasonable" in any particular case.

The rights of parents, guardians and teachers, in regard to the chastisement of children, were expressly recognized in English law by the Prevention of Cruelty to Children Act 1904 (4 Edw. 7. c. 15) (§ 28). A master had a right to inflict moderate chastisement upon his apprentice for neglect or other misbehaviour, provided that he did so himself, and that the apprentice was under age (Archbold, Cr. Pl., 23rd ed., 795).

In England and Wales, section 58 of the Children Act 2004 enables parents to justify common assault or battery of their children as "reasonable punishment", but prevents the defence being used in relation to Assault occasioning actual bodily harm (i.e. when causing anything beyond "transient and trifling" such as bruising) and any more serious harm.

In law in the Republic of Ireland, the rule of law allowing "physical chastisement" by teachers was abolished in 1997, and the common-law defence of "reasonable chastisement" by parents and guardians was abolished in 2015.

== Married women ==
William Blackstone wrote in the 18th century in the Commentaries on the Laws of England:

The husband also (by the old law) might give his wife moderate correction. For, as he is to answer for her misbehavior, the law thought it reasonable to entrust him with this power of restraining her, by domestic chastisement, (...) But this power of correction was confined within reasonable bounds; and the husband was prohibited to use any violence to his wife, (...) other than lawfully and reasonably pertains to the husband for the rule and correction of his wife. The civil law gave the husband the same, or a larger, authority over his wife; allowing him, for some misdemeanors, to beat his wife severely with whips and sticks, for others, only with moderate punishment.
But, with us, in the politer reign of Charles the Second, this power of correction began to be doubted: and a wife may now have security of the peace against her husband; or, in return, a husband against his wife.... Yet the lower rank of people, who were always fond of the old common law, still claim and exert their ancient privilege: and the courts of law will still permit a husband to restrain a wife of her liberty, in case of any gross misbehavior.

In the UK the old law of moderate correction was similarly removed in 1891.

By the end of the 1870s the right of a husband to chastise his wife had generally met with disapproval in the US, even in states which formerly agreed to the practice. Courts did overrule the common-law principle that a husband had the right to "physically chastise an errant wife". It has been held that a man can not beat his adulterous wife, drunken, insolvent or refractory wife. Nor pull her hair, choke her, spit in her face or kick her about the floor.

== See also ==
- Assault occasioning actual bodily harm
- Castigation
- Corporal punishment
- Corporal punishment in the home
- Domestic violence
- Marital rape
- South African criminal law § Disciplinary chastisement
