= South African Schools Act, 1996 =

Law in South Africa

South African Schools Act NO. 84 is established by the government of South Africa on 15 November 1996.

The Act is to create and provide for a uniform system for the organizations, governance and funding of the country's schools. It is structured into seven chapters on the structure of schools, their funding, the organization of the different types of schools and the structure of the educational process. Schools are classified into primary or secondary. Both types of schools are further classified into five and four types, respectively.

The Basic Education Laws Amendment Act of 2024 changed the compulsory attendance provisions of the South African Schools Act. Since 24 December 2024, compulsory schooling has begun with Grade R on the first school day of the year in which a child turns six, continuing until the last school day of the year in which the child turns 15 or completes Grade 9, whichever occurs first. The admission age for Grade R is distinct from the compulsory attendance requirement: children may be admitted to a public school's Grade R class at age four if they turn five by 30 June of the admission year. This distinction allows children to enter Grade R before reaching the age at which school attendance becomes compulsory.

== See also ==
- Education in South Africa
