= Christian Education South Africa v Minister of Education =

South African legal case

- Court: Constitutional Court of South Africa
- Decided: 18 August 2000
- Citations: [2000] ZACC 11, 2000 (4) SA 757 (CC); 2000 (10) BCLR 1051 (CC)

Case history
- Appealed from: South Eastern Cape Local Division

Court membership
- Judges sitting: Chaskalson P, Langa DP, Goldstone, Madala, Mokgoro, Ngcobo, O'Regan, Sachs & Yacoob JJ, Cameron AJ

Case opinions
- Decision by: Sachs

Christian Education South Africa v Minister of Education is an important case in South African law. It was heard in the Constitutional Court, by Chaskalson P, Langa DP, Goldstone J, Madala J, Mokgoro J, Ngcobo J, O'Regan J, Sachs J, Yacoob J and Cameron AJ, on 4 May 2000, with judgment handed down on 18 August. FG Richings SC (with him AM Achtzehn) appeared for the appellant, and MNS Sithole SC (with him BJ Pienaar) for the respondent.

== Facts ==
The central question to be answered in the present appeal, from a decision in a Local Division, was whether, when Parliament enacted the South African Schools Act (wherein it prohibited corporal punishment in schools), it had violated the rights of parents of children at independent schools who, in line with their religious convictions, had consented to its use.

The appellant averred that corporal correction was an integral part of the active Christian ethos which it sought to provide its learners and that the blanket prohibition of its use in its schools invaded individual and parental and community rights to practise religion freely. Having been unsuccessful in the court a quo, the appellant was granted leave to appeal to the Constitutional Court on the grounds that the blanket prohibition contained in section 10 of the Act infringed the provisions in the Constitution relating to

- privacy;
- freedom of religion, belief and opinion;
- education;
- language and culture; and
- cultural, religious and linguistic communities.

The respondent contended that it was the infliction of corporal punishment, not its prohibition, which infringed constitutional rights. He argued that the appellant's claim to be entitled to special exemption was inconsistent with the constitutional provisions relating to

- equality;
- human dignity;
- freedom and security of the person; and
- children.

The respondent contended further that section 31(1) rights could not, in terms of the provisions of section 31(2), be exercised in a manner inconsistent with any provision of the Bill of Rights, and that the trend in democratic countries was to ban corporal punishment in schools, and finally that South Africa's obligations as signatory to various conventions required the abolition of corporal punishment in schools, since it involved subjecting children to violence and degrading punishment. Inasmuch as the outlawing of corporal punishment limited other rights, such limitation was reasonable and justifiable in an open and democratic society based on human dignity, equality and freedom. While the sincerity of the beliefs of the parents could not be doubted, nor their right to practise their religion in association with each other be disputed, and while the right of parents to administer corporal punishment at home was not challenged, such conduct was not appropriate in schools, nor in the education system.

In its argument that its rights of religious freedom, guaranteed by sections 15 and 31 of Constitution, had been infringed, the appellant argued that the rights in question should be viewed cumulatively. It argued further that the corporal correction applied in its schools with the authorisation of the parent was not inconsistent with any provision of the Bill of Rights. Accordingly, the qualification contained in section 31(2) did not apply. The appellant argued further that, once it succeeded in establishing that the Act substantially impacted upon its sincerely held religious beliefs, the failure of the Act to provide an appropriate exemption could only pass constitutional muster if it were justified by a compelling state interest.

In response to this argument, the respondent contended that the governing provision was section 31, not section 15. The corporal punishment was delivered in the context of the community activity in a school; accordingly, it could only attract constitutional protection if, in terms of section 31(2), it was not inconsistent with any other provision of the Bill of Rights. Since corporal punishment violated the right to equality and the right to dignity, it forfeited any claim to constitutional regard. It was argued in the alternative that, if corporal punishment at the appellant's schools did not violate the Bill of Rights, its prohibition by the Act was reasonable and justifiable in an open and democratic society.

== Judgment ==
The court noted that the matter concerned a multiplicity of intersecting constitutional values and interests, some overlapping and some competing. The overlap and tension between the different clusters of rights reflected themselves in contradictory assessments of how the central constitutional value of dignity was implicated.

The interest protected by section 31 was not, the court found, a statistical one, dependent on a counterbalancing of numbers, but rather a qualitative one, based on respect for diversity. Section 31(2) ensured that the concept of rights of members of communities that associated on the basis of language, culture and religion could not be used to shield practices which offended the Bill of Rights.

For the purposes of making a determination in the matter, the court found it necessary to adopt the approach most favourable to the appellant and assume, without deciding, that the appellant's religious rights under sections 15 and 31(1) were both in issue. It was also necessary to assume, again without deciding, that corporal punishment as practised by the appellant's members was not inconsistent with any provision of the Bill of Rights as contemplated by section 31(2). In the light of these assumptions, section 10 of the Act limited the parents' religious rights both under section 31 and under section 15.

The court held further that, in relation to the question of whether the limitation on the rights of the appellants could be justified in terms of section 36 of the Constitution, the relevant test was that limitations on constitutional rights could only pass constitutional muster if it was concluded that, considering the nature and importance of the right and the extent to which it was limited, such limitation was justified in relation to the purpose, importance and effect of the provision which resulted in the limitation, taking into account the availability of less restrictive means to achieve the relevant purpose. Although there may be special problems attendant on undertaking the limitations analysis in respect of religious practices, the standard to be applied was the nuanced and contextual one required by section 36, not the rigid one of strict scrutiny.

What was in issue was not so much whether a general prohibition on corporal punishment in schools could be justified, but whether the impact of such a prohibition on the religious beliefs and practices of the members of the appellant could be justified under the limitations test of section 36. The proportionality exercise had to relate to whether the failure to accommodate the appellant's religious belief and practice by means of the exemption prayed for could be accepted as reasonable and justifiable in an open and democratic society based on human dignity, freedom and equality.

While the relevant parents could no longer authorise teachers to apply corporal punishment in their name pursuant to their beliefs, they were not being deprived by the Act of their general right and capacity to bring up their children according to their Christian beliefs. The effect of the Act was limited merely to preventing them from empowering the schools to administer corporal punishment.

The respondent had established that the prohibition of corporal punishment was part and parcel of a national program to transform the education system and bring it into line with the letter and spirit of the Constitution. The creation of uniform norms and standards for all schools was crucial for educational development, as was a coherent and principled system of discipline. The state was also under a constitutional duty to take steps to help diminish the amount of public and private violence in society generally, and to protect all people, especially children, from maltreatment, abuse or degradation. Furthermore, in every matter concerning a child, the child's best interests were of paramount importance. This principle was not excluded in cases where the religious rights of the parent were involved.

It was true that to single out a member of a religious community for disadvantageous treatment would, on the face of it, constitute unfair discrimination against that community. The contrary, however, did not hold. To grant respect to sincerely held religious views of a community, and make an exception from the general law to accommodate them, would not be unfair to anyone else who did not hold those views. The essence of equality lay not in treating everyone in the same way, but in treating everyone with equal concern and respect. Permission to allow the practice to continue would, in the circumstances, not be inconsistent with the equality provisions of the Bill of Rights.

The court held that the outlawing of physical punishment in the school represented more than a pragmatic attempt to deal with disciplinary problems in a new way. It had a principled and symbolic function manifestly intended to promote respect for the dignity and physical and emotional integrity of all children. The schools in question of necessity functioned in the public domain so as to prepare their learners for life in the broader society. It was not unreasonable to expect those schools to make suitable adaptations in respect of non-discriminatory laws affecting their codes of discipline.

The parents, furthermore, were not being obliged to make an absolute and strenuous choice between obeying a law of the land or following their conscience. They could do both simultaneously. What they were prevented from doing was authorising teachers, acting in their name and on school premises, to fulfil what they regarded as their conscientious and biblically ordained responsibilities for the guidance of their children. Save for this one aspect, the appellant's schools were not prevented from maintaining their specific Christian ethos.

The court decided, accordingly, that, when all the factors were weighed together, the scales came down firmly in favour of upholding the generality of the law in the face of the appellant's claim for a constitutionally compelled exemption. The appeal was dismissed and the decision in the South Eastern Cape Local Division, in Christian Education South Africa v Minister of Education confirmed.

== Semble ==
There was no curator ad litem representing the interests of the children, as it had been accepted in the court a quo that it was unnecessary to appoint one and that the state would represent the interests of the child. However, the children concerned were from a highly conscientised community and many would have been in their late teens and capable of articulate expression. Although both the state and the parents were in a position to speak on their behalf, neither was able to speak in their name. A curator could have made sensitive enquiries so as to enable their voice or voices to be heard. This, the court suggested, would have enriched the dialogue and the factual and experiential foundations for the balancing exercise undertaken in the instant matter would have been more secure.

== See also ==
- Chapter Two of the Constitution of South Africa
- Constitution of South Africa
- Corporal punishment
- Education in South Africa
- Equality
- Human rights
- Freedom of religion
- Law of South Africa
- Freedom of Religion South Africa v Minister of Justice and Constitutional Development
