= National Special Operations Force (Malaysia) =

- Pasukan Operasi Khusus Nasional Malaysia
- Founded: 27 October 2016
- Disbanded: 2018
- Country: Malaysia
- Branch: Malaysian Armed Forces; Royal Malaysia Police; Malaysian Maritime Enforcement Agency
- Type: Special Operations Task Force
- Role: Provide fully capable special operations forces to defend Malaysia and its interests and plan and synchronize operations against terrorist networks.
- Size: 187 (October 2016)
- Part of: National Security Council
- Operating Base: Fort Perdana, Sungai Besi, Kuala Lumpur
- Mottos: "Tangkas dan Tepat" (English: Swift and Accurate)

Commanders
- Director Special Forces: Classified

The National Special Operations Force (NSOF) (Malay: Pasukan Operasi Khusus Nasional) has been Malaysia's main security force which serves as the first responder to any terror threats on the country's sovereignty after October 2016. The force covers elements from the Malaysian Armed Forces, Royal Malaysia Police and the Malaysian Maritime Enforcement Agency.

NSOF is the third Task Force attached to the National Security Council (NSC) (Malay: Majlis Keselamatan Negara Malaysia; MKN) after the Federal Special Task Force (PPKPS/L) and Special Malaysia Disaster Assistance and Rescue Team (SMART).

The NSOF is secretive in nature and precise composition, activities, location and commander of the task force are strictly classified.

== History ==
Formed on 27 October 2016 by Prime Minister Najib Razak, the NSOF will serve as the nation's security forces first responders against all threats. The NSOF personnel will be seconded from the three agencies in the initial stage. Designated posts will be made once the unit is fully operational, which reports directly to the National Security Council (NSC). This is to prevent any disruptions to the operations of the agencies involved. Malaysia is the first country in the world to form an integrated security force to respond to terror threats.

The NSOF has 17 officers and 170 special operations personnels from the MAF, RMP and MMEA, who will be based at the Fort Perdana, Sungai Besi. The establishment of the NSOF proves the government's 'no-compromise' attitude in issues of security. NSOF acts as a quick reaction force to curb terrorism in the early stages. The land, air and maritime units will be mobilised as the early group and will confront, fight and eliminate the threats. The main task of NSOF is to eliminate all forms of terrorism on land, air or in the water and to be always prepared to react quickly against threats. Team members will continue Force Integration Training (FIT) to enhance their skills to deal with critical situations and prepare contingency plans for threats to national security and perform other duties as directed.

It has been reported that the NSOF was disbanded in July 2018 by the Pakatan Harapan government, which will be replaced by a Special Forces Command in the Malaysian military.

== Roles ==
On NSOF's operating procedure, the NSC would report to the Inspector-General of Police and MAF chief in the event of an incident, who would then refer it to him to give the nod to mobilise. This is made possible with the existence of the NSC Act. None other than to protect the people. There are no other intentions or purposes. At its early stages, all NSOF strengths and assets will be assigned from the other security forces, with new application to be open in the future so as not to further affect existing force members. The first NSOF batch will be on duty for at least three years, while future intakes into the force will be assigned to a period of no less than two years.

== Introductions ==
The eight elements of Malaysia's Special Operations Force have been tasked with the important objective of maintaining Malaysia's security, specifically in combating terrorism. A mission especially important in the wake of the 11 September attacks on the World Trade Center and the Pentagon, and in a climate of global terrorism which would see the later bombing of the tourist centre of Bali and the J.W. Marriott Hotel in Jakarta, bombings and murders in Southern Thailand and the bomb explosions in the railway stations and transit systems of Madrid and London. Malaysia's security agencies eagerly studied the lessons to be learnt from all such incidents so as to prepare to deal with similar terrorism, in the event that the terrorists should see Malaysia as a target. In November 2003 Malaysia passed new counter-terrorism laws that were widely criticised by local human rights groups for being vague and excessively broad. Critics claim that the laws put the basic rights of free expression, association, and assembly at risk. Malaysia persisted in holding around 100 alleged militants without trial, including five Malaysian students detained for alleged terrorist activity while studying in Karachi, Pakistan. Malaysia maintains a high level of security and to date no similar terrorist atrocities have occurred.

Previously the only incidents with possible links to Islamic terrorism have been the detonation of a small bomb in Kuala Lumpur's Puduraya bus station and more significantly the 2000 Sauk raid by Al-Ma'unah militants, an audacious raid to steal weapons from a military base to arm an Islamic insurrection. This attempted insurrection was swiftly defeated, the result of the close co-operation and relationship of the government, private agencies and society as a whole. A co-operation and relationship born from the initiatives that from 1948 to 1989 defeated the communist insurgents during the Malayan Emergency and the later, the second insurgency.

== Components ==
=== Military ===
==== Grup Gerak Khas ====
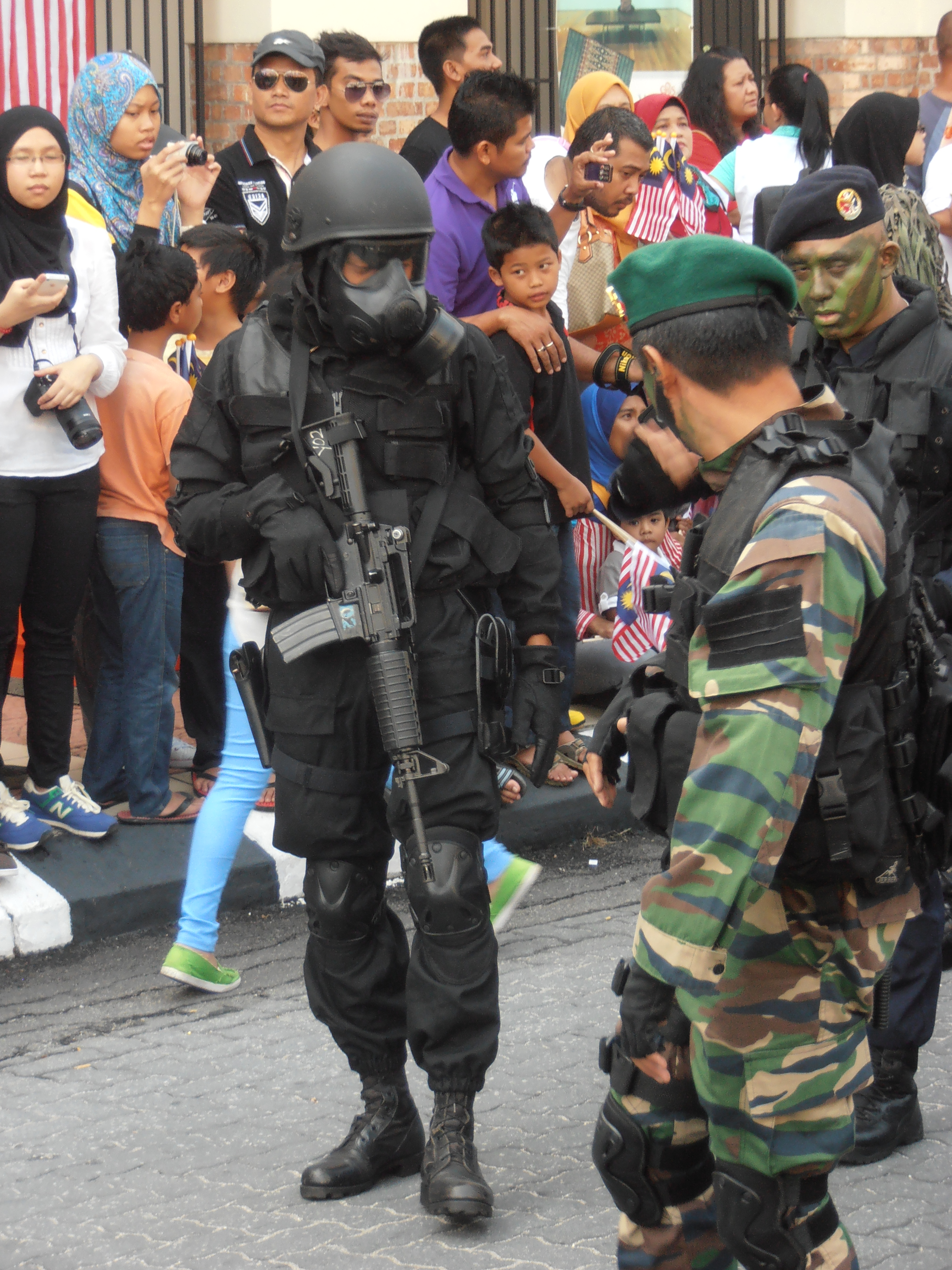
The trooper of GGK with full equipment gear, armed with Colt M4A1 Carbine.

The Grup Gerak Khas (GGK) (English: Special Service Group) is the main entity element in the Malaysian Army. It is basically a commando regiment in the Malaysian Army Corps. The mission of the GGK is to provide a squadron to locate, report, harass and disrupt the enemy through long range infiltration as well as operating in close collaboration with guerrilla or partisan forces. GGK will also plan, prepare for, and when directed, deploy to conduct unconventional warfare, internal defence, special reconnaissance and direct actions etc. in support of Government policy objectives within designated areas of responsibility.

GGK are trained to conduct unconventional warfare operations – guerrilla / anti-guerrilla warfare, escape and evasion, subversion, sabotage, counter-terrorist and particularly their primary specialisation – jungle warfare. The troopers are also schooled in direct action operations and special reconnaissance. Currently, there are 3 fully equipped regiments (21st Kdo, 22nd Kdo & 11th RGK). GGK has seen action in Cambodia, Somalia, western Sahara, Namibia and Bosnia among others. Most recently GGK has also been involved with peacekeeping missions in Lebanon and Timor Leste.

==== PASKAL ====
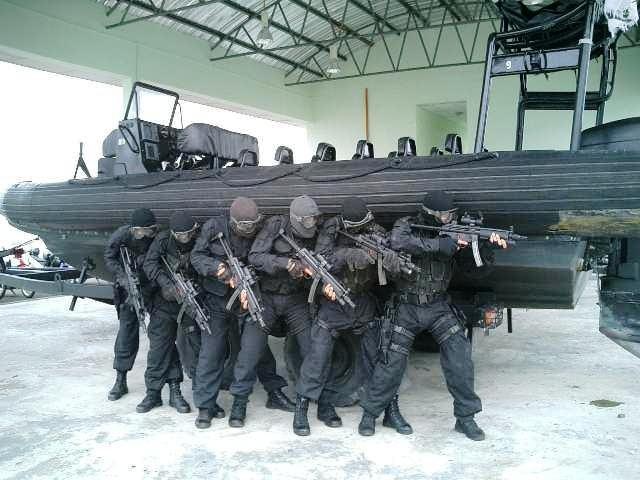
PASKAL team with tactical BDUs conducting CQC drills.

The Royal Malaysian Navy also has a special forces apparatus to secure Malaysian maritime areas, especially the Malacca Straits, from intruders and terrorist groups. The unit is known as Naval Special Warfare Forces (Malay: Pasukan Khas Laut; PASKAL) by its Malay acronym in the year 1980. The unit was established using commando-trained officers and men from the Security Regiment. First established in the year 1975, the role of this team is similar to coast guards whereby it was assigned to secure RMN vessels, and coastal areas. However, PASKAL forces have since been redeveloped along the lines of the UK Royal Marines Commando and US Navy SEALs alongside receiving further training from these units. PASKAL now reflects a more specialised combat unit with responsibilities to secure all strategic areas and conducting other counter-terrorism operations in cargo shipments, oil rigs and the terrain. Some of its personnel are stationed in man-made 'islands' in the Spratlys and in strategic areas within the country's Exclusive Economic Zone (EEZ). PASKAL is equipped with the up-to-date weaponry as they are also funded by an oil consortium (one of PASKAL's main missions is to protect oil rigs in Malaysian waters) and shipping companies.

==== PASKAU ====
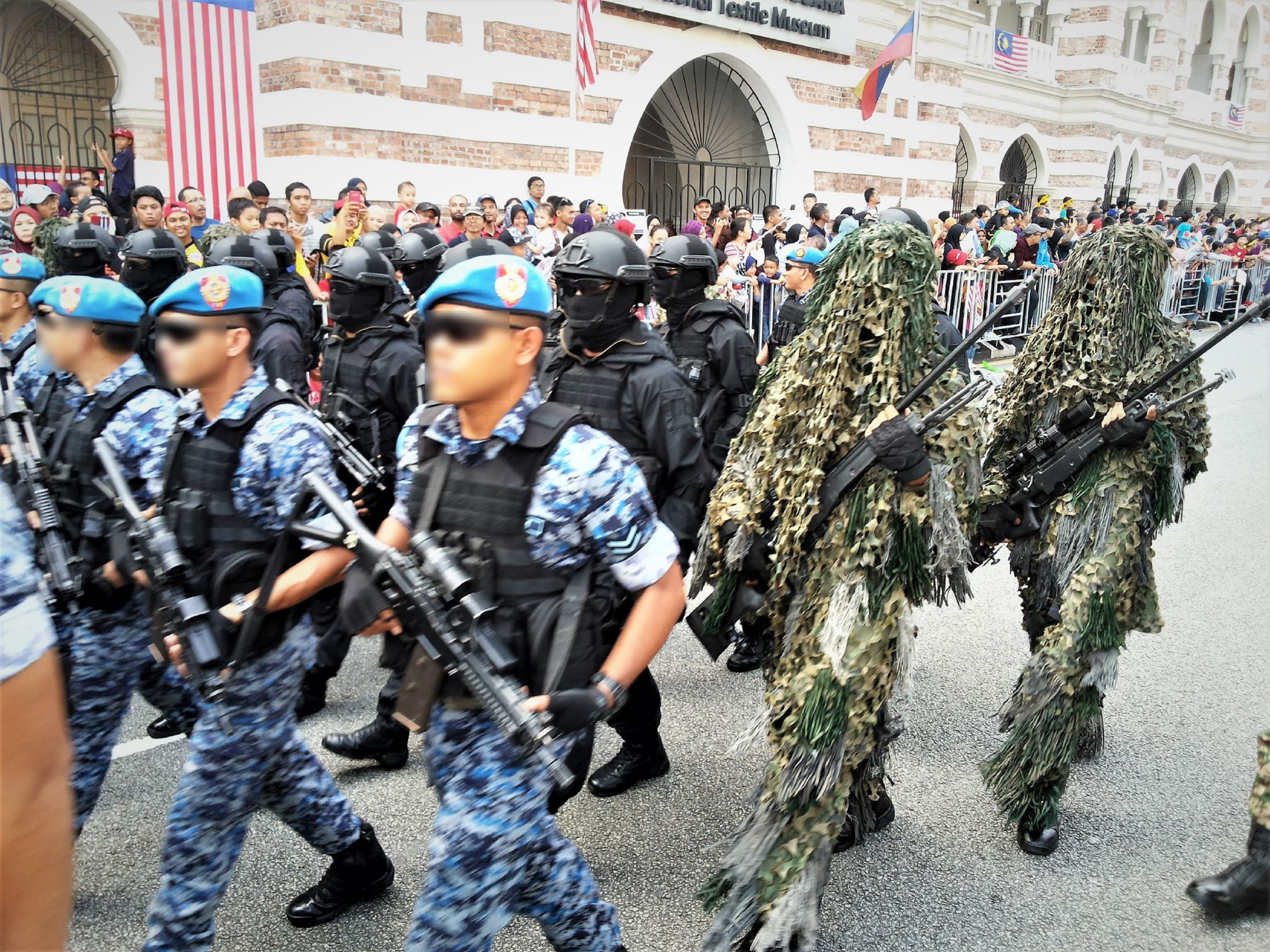
PASKAU detachments with dressed in the No.4 Digital Camouflage, tactical gear and ghillie suits parading during the 60th National Day Parade of Malaysia at Sultan Abdul Samad Street, Kuala Lumpur.

The Royal Malaysian Air Force once had a special operations force to secure the RMAF strategic airbase which was known as Special Air Service of Air Force (Malay: Pasukan Khas Udara; PASKAU). In its first establishment, the name of this unit was known as HANDAU (Air and Land Defense, Malay: Pertahanan Darat dan Udara) and at that moment, it did not have any counter-terrorism roles yet. The tentative "special forces" designation was probably due to the unit's airborne capability. This unit was established after the covert attacks on the RMAF strategic amenities in Sungai Besi by agents of the Malayan Communist Party.

With very high competency level, the unit was tasked to secure the RMAF airbases and amenities and also civil airports including Kuala Lumpur International Airport (KLIA) if necessary. Under Directive No. 18 National Defense Council (Malay: Arahan 18 Majlis Keselamatan Negara) it is also tasked with handling hijackers or terrorism involving RMAF bases. The GGK army commando were also included to join this unit at its formation. Nowadays, PASKAU had the three branches including Flight Hostage Rescue Team (Malay: Skuad Udara Penyelamat Tebusan, tasked on Counter-Terrorist force), Combat Air Rescue Squadron (Malay: Skuadron Penyelamat Tempur Udara; SPTU, CSAR task) and Force Protection Squadron (Malay: Skuadron Kawalan Medan; SKM, Air Base protections task). The unit conducted special training technique and rescue missions, especially rescue operations for a downed pilot behind enemy lines or in hostile territory, but they were much more popular for life-saving services to civilians (courtesy flights etc.). Other than that, PASKAU may also search and eliminate enemy troops who execute sabotage against RMAF air bases.

=== Law enforcement ===
==== Pasukan Gerakan Khas ====
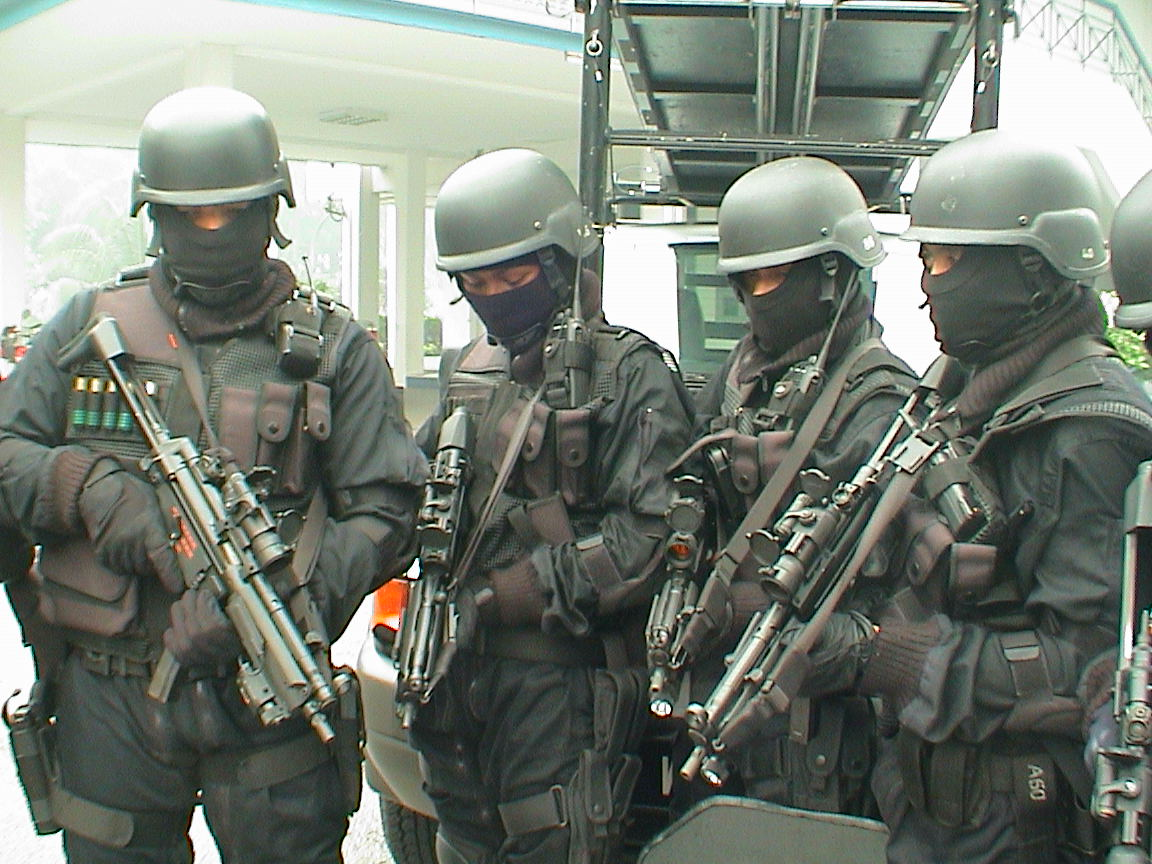
PGK operatives on standby. They are armed with MP5-Ns equipped with Aimpoint CompM2 Sight and Insight Technology flashlight.

In the days of communist insurgency, the Royal Malaysia Police had a light infantry arm called Pasukan Polis Hutan (PPH) (English: Police Field Force). They had several battalions and among them was the elite one, known as 69 Commando Battalion or VAT 69. It was actually formed in 1969 (hence the name – 69). The police general duty too had the special ops unit – Unit Tindakhas (UTK). UTK had a SWAT-like function as well as close protection roles. After the communist terrorists laid down arms in 1989, VAT 69 had problems finding a proper role. Finally in October 1997, the PPH was renamed as Pasukan Gerakan Am (PGA) (English: General Operations Force; GOF) while UTK and 69 Commando were merged in a special operations command. It was then called Pasukan Gerakan Khas (PGK) (English: Special Operations Command; SOCOM).

All officers and personnels of VAT 69 and UTK's wherever conduct the special training from the United States (besides Germany GSG-9, Australia, Britain and New Zealand SAS) including special investigators, counter-terrorist experts, risk, special demolitions, airborne and much more. The PGK police counter-terrorists are ever involved in anti-terror operations in Malaysia, for example the armed rebellion of the Al Ma'unah terrorist militia led by Mohamed Amin Razali. The police special force, together with Grup Gerak Khas, successfully tracked down the rebellion, as well as being involved in the arrest of suspected Jemaah Islamiyah terrorist groups who were involved in the 9/11 attacks and Bali bombing. Beside that, the unit also took over the 10 Para and GGK duties in Timor Leste after the terrorism in the country was calmed down.

==== Special Task and Rescue ====
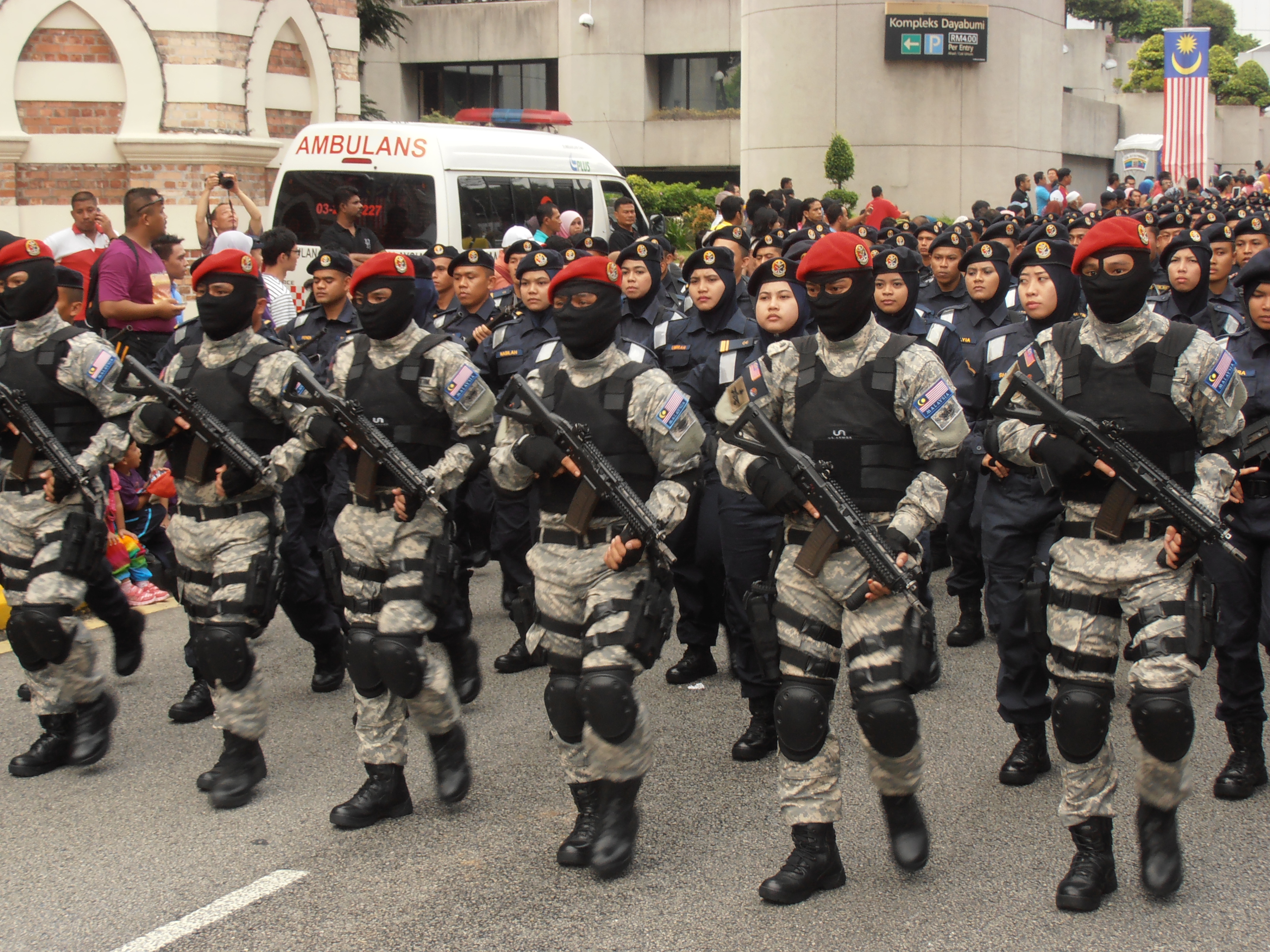
Special Task And Rescue (STAR) with new red beret during the 57th National Day Parade

The Special Task and Rescue (Malay: Pasukan Tindakan Khas dan Penyelamat Maritim) or STAR team is the official coast guard special forces of the Malaysian Maritime Enforcement Agency which was established to protect local maritime assets, especially the Straits of Malacca. Initially, the commandos were formerly trained by Air Force PASKAU and formed on 25 April 2005. STARs are trained to be a first responder to potential terrorist situations; deny terrorist acts; perform security actions against non-compliant actors; perform tactical facility entry and enforcement; participate in port level counterterrorism exercises; and educate other forces on Coast Guard counterterrorism procedures.

STARs are a quick response force capable of rapid nationwide deployment via air, ground or sea transportation in response to changing threat conditions. Multi-mission capability facilitates augmentation for other selected Coast Guard missions. The STAR's purpose is to develop systems and processes for standardised training, equipment, organisation, planning, and scheduling of rapidly deployable specialised forces to execute mission objectives in support of tactical and operational commanders.

=== Support units ===
==== 10 Paratrooper Brigade ====
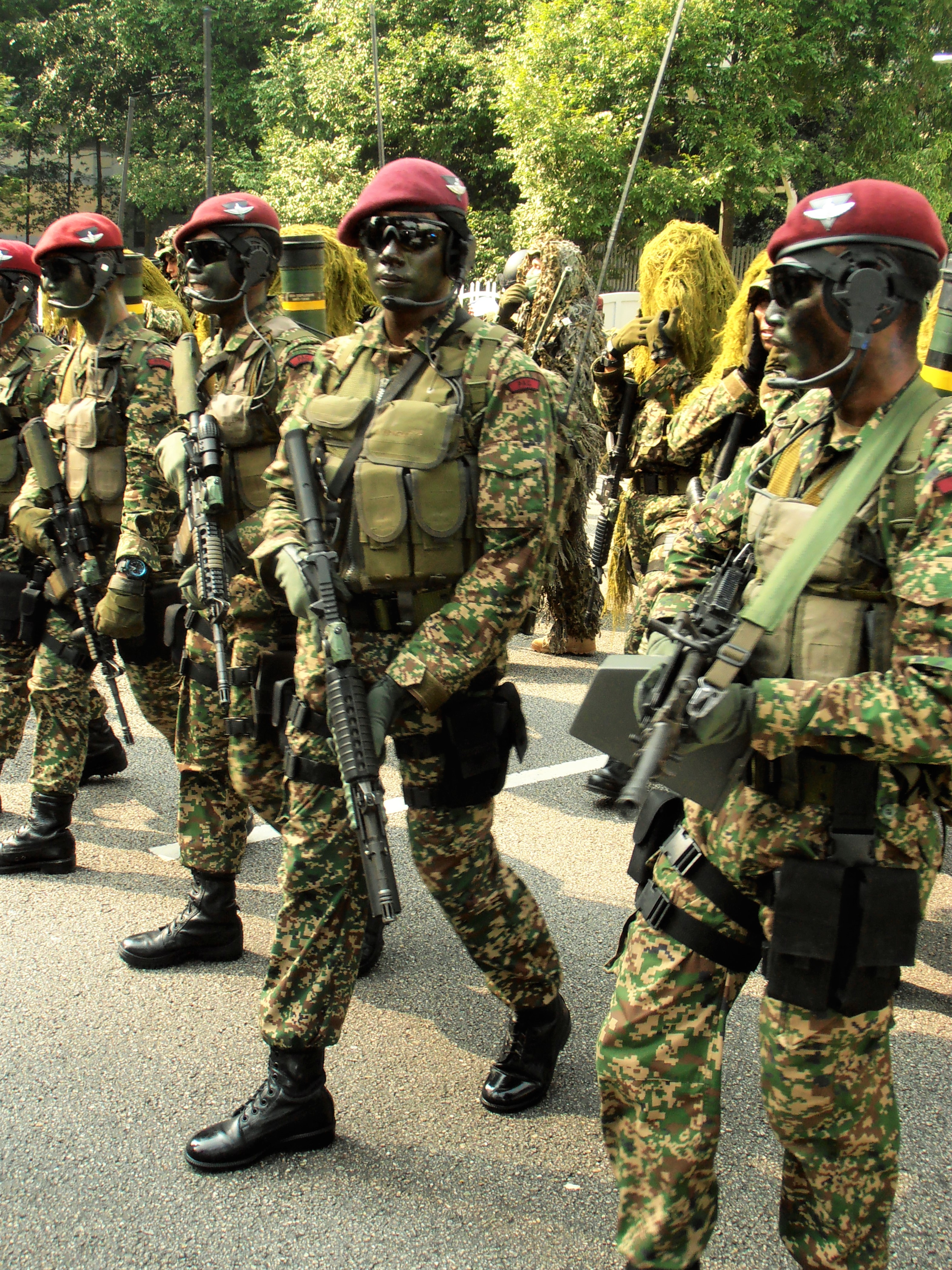
Paratroopers from 10 Para preparing to march for the 59th Merdeka Day parade

10 Paratrooper Brigade (10 PARA) is an elite rapid deployment brigade which is a branch of the Malaysian Army. It was then merged with other infantry elements including 3 battalions, 1 artillery regiment, 1 armour squadron and 11 supporting units.

While primarily tasked with rapid deployment, it is also involved in the fight against terrorism but in a different manner. This is because the operational tasks for the 10th Para involves the convergence of conventional warfare tactics requiring a high number of personnel and equipment. This includes amphibian warfare and airborne operations, just to name a few. 10 Para is not considered as a special operations unit. The paratrooper force consists of male and some female paratroopers.

==== UNGERIN ====
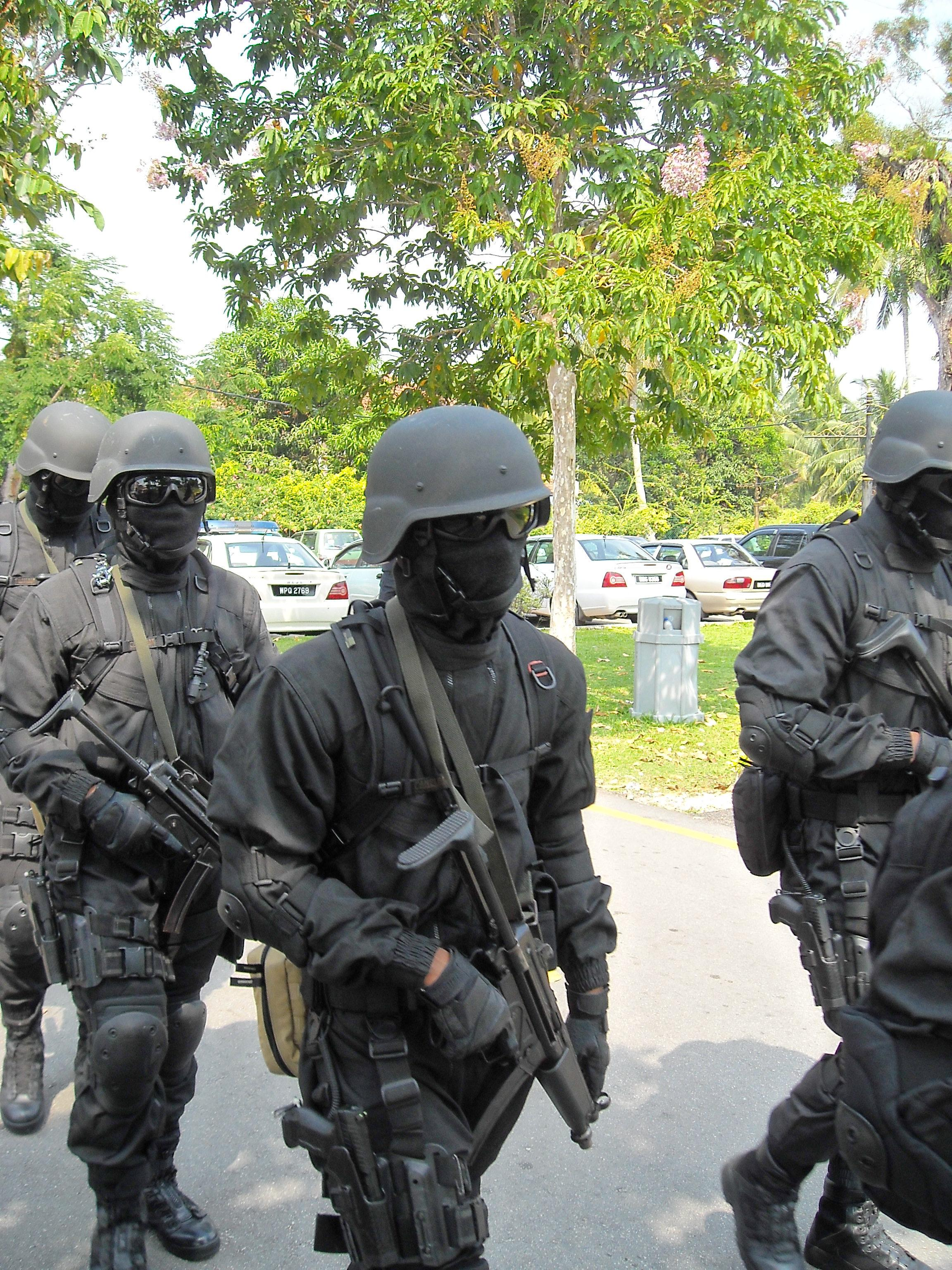
The UNGERIN (Unit Gempur Marin) anti-terror operatives on patrol with MP5A3

The Marine Combat Unit or UNGERIN (Unit Gempur Marin) is a newly formed maritime anti-terror elite forces which was established in March 2006 and was under control of the Marine Operations Force of RMP. Very different from other Malaysian special forces, the UNGERIN is the only one force in Malaysia which is trained by the United States (all special forces of Malaysia are regularly trained with foreign special forces including the Special Air Service Regiments of Australia, New Zealand and the United Kingdom and a number of US services). The unit which has been given special training by 69 Commando and US Navy SEALs were tasked with securing the Malaysia maritime, especially the Malacca Straits and Sulu Sea from threats at sea, especially piracy and smugglers, and cooperate with naval elite units and coast guard.

==== Rapid Actions Troops ====
The Rapid Actions Troops, or Trup Tindakan Cepat, is a new Prison Department anti-terror elite forces squad, which was established on 3 October 2005 and operates under control of the Malaysian Prison Department. Formed with 20 members that had undergone three months training at the Special Warfare Training Centre (PULPAK) in Sungai Udang Fort, Malacca by 11th Rejimen Gerak Khas Counter-Terrorist Regiment for dealing with terrorist threats and riot which occurred inside the jails in Malaysia.

With the formation of this team, the Prisons Department was able to carry out escort tasks without police assistance, escorting prisoners listed as high-profile criminals to detention centres. When needed, the team is also used to assist the other Malaysian special forces in counter-terrorism missions.

== See also ==
- List of special forces units
  - United Kingdom Special Forces
  - United States Special Operations Command
- NS Forces Warriors F.C.
