= Johor Bahru Prison =

Former prison in Johor Bahru, Malaysia

Johor Bahru Prison Penjara Johor Bahru Kota Jail
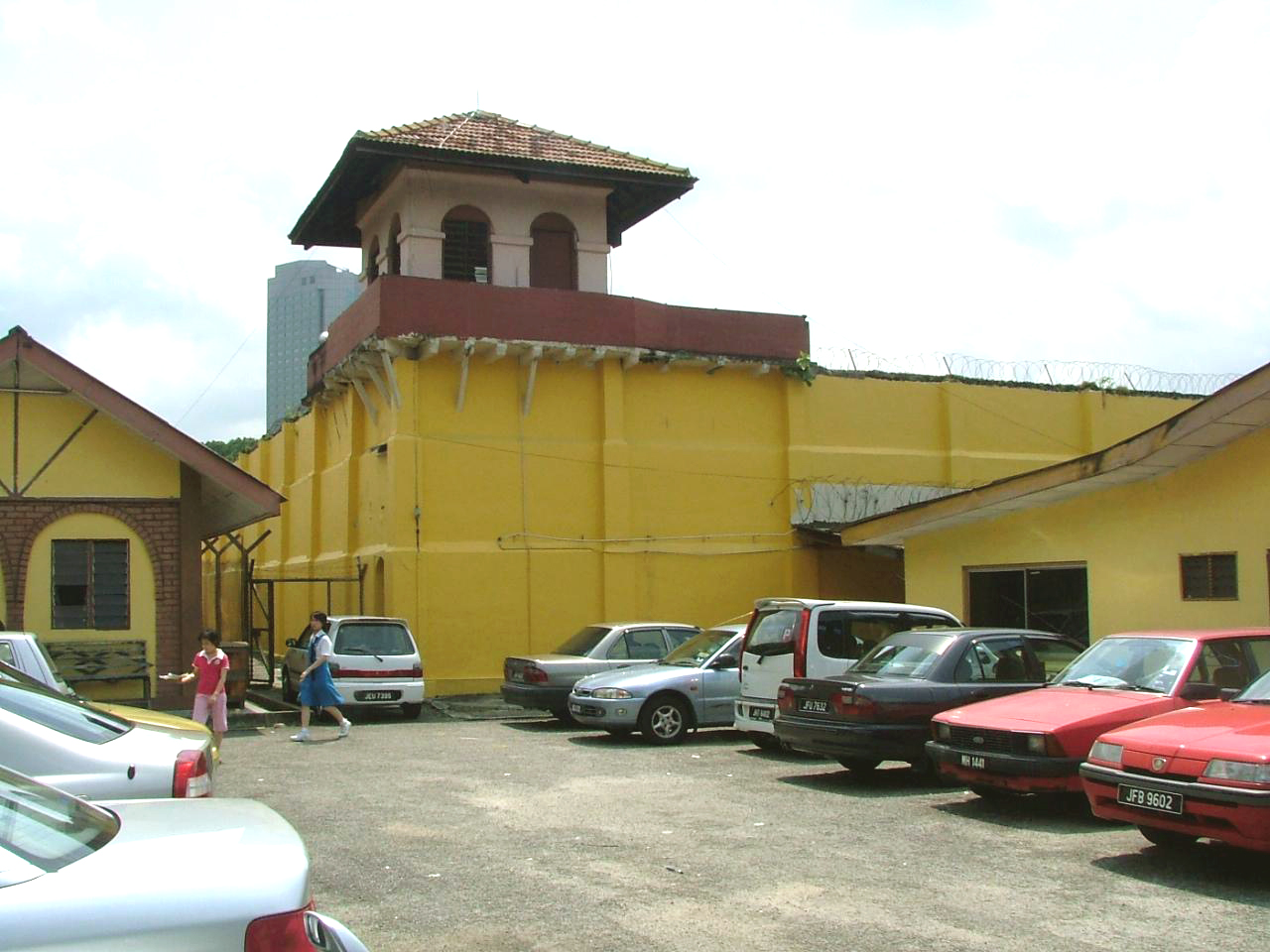
- Interactive map of Johor Bahru Prison; Penjara Johor Bahru; Kota Jail
- Location: Johor Bahru, Johor, Malaysia; 1.4632841109120167°N 103.75646084319925°E
- Status: Defunct
- Security class: Medium-security
- Capacity: 1,500
- Opened: 1882
- Closed: 2005
- Managed by: Malaysian Prison Department (1882-2005)

Johor Bahru Prison (Malay: Penjara Johor Bahru), also known as Kota Jail and Ayer Molek Prison, is a defunct prison in Johor Bahru, Johor, Malaysia. Constructed in 1883, it is the third oldest prison in Malaysia after Taiping Prison in Perak and Banda Hilir Prison in Malacca. The prison relocated its operations to Simpang Renggam in central Johor in 2005, and has since been used as an event space.

== History ==
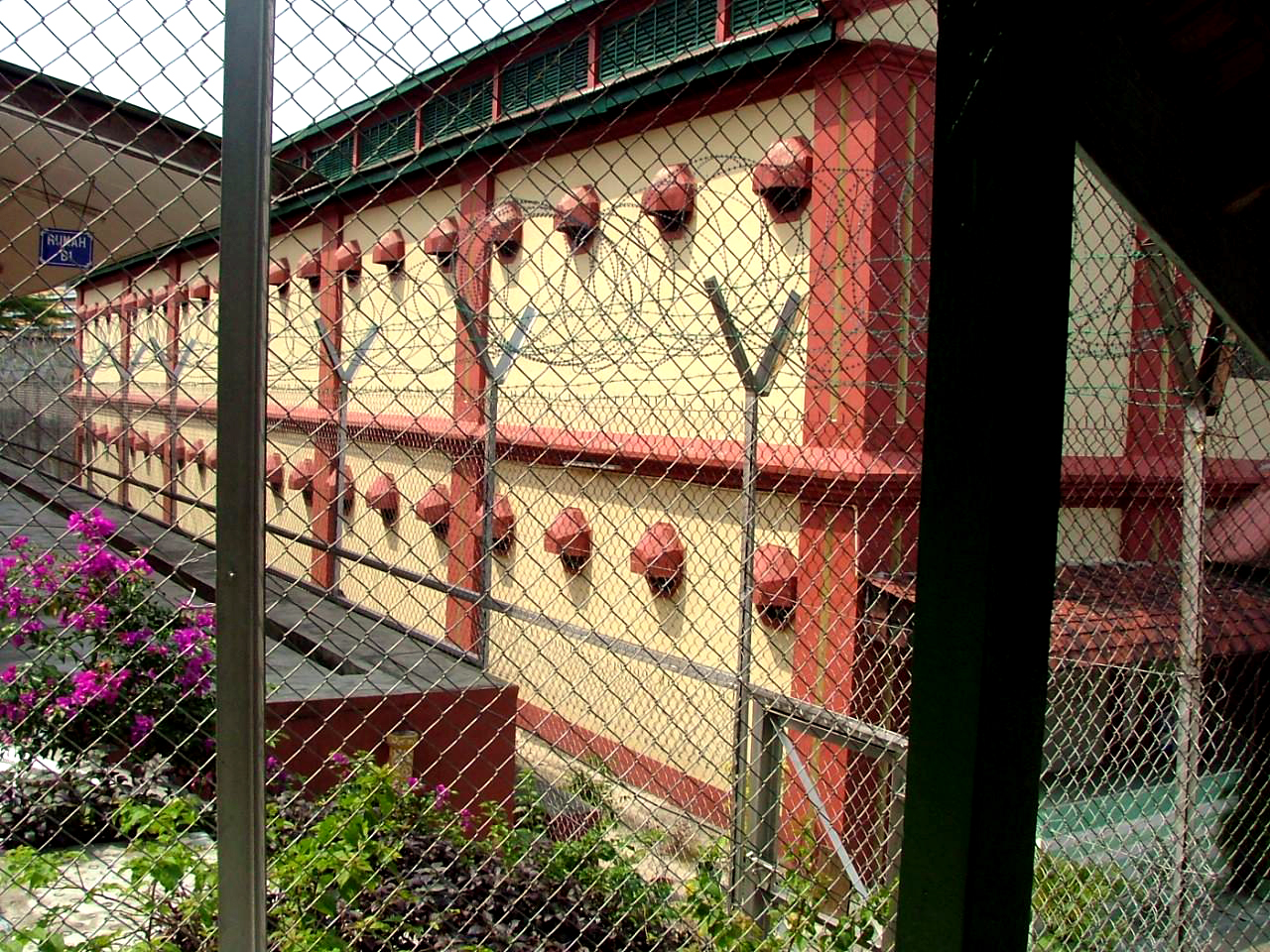
One of the ten accommodation blocks used for housing the inmates in the prison.

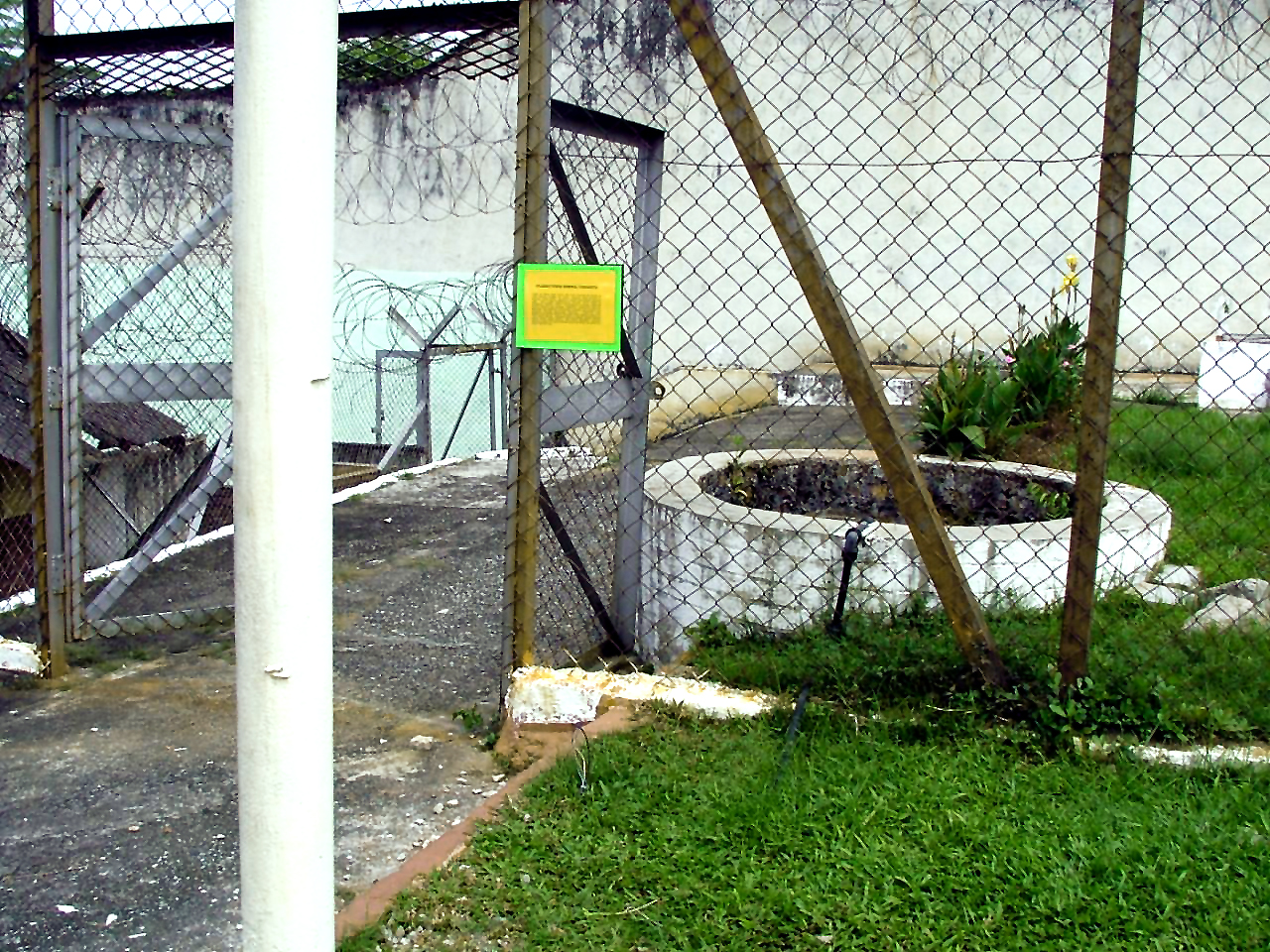
The well allegedly used as an execution site by Japanese forces during World War II.

Johor Bahru Prison was designed by Sultan Ibrahim of Johor, who had visited prisons in Shanghai and Osaka to study the physical conditions and designs of prisons in those cities. The building contract was awarded to Wong Ah Fook, a prominent Chinese building contractor, on 16 April 1882. After it was built in 1883, the prison originally occupied an area of 400 square feet (37 m^{2}) with a capacity of 200 inmates. At the time, there were only two cell blocks, two training workshops, a kitchen, a toilet block, a clinic and an administrative office. The prison housed criminals and dissenters, including those who had rebelled against the British colonial government.

During the Japanese occupation of Malaya from 1941 to 1945, the prison served as a bunker for Imperial Japanese Army troops led by General Yamashita Tomoyuki. According to former prison staff, the well in the prison was used as an execution site by the Japanese.

Over the years, the prison expanded to accommodate 1,500 inmates. The number of cell blocks increased from two to ten and the number of training workshops increased from one to five. Additional facilities, including a visiting area, a counselling clinic, a welfare officer's room and a surau, were built, bringing the total land area occupied by the prison to 4.5 acres (18,000 m^{2}), which was enclosed by a 20 feet (6.1 m) high wall. The surrounding area was also developed to include living quarters for prison staff. During this time, judicial corporal punishment, in the form of whipping with a rotan, was administered at the prison on Mondays and Thursdays.

Living conditions gradually worsened because the prison became too overcrowded – to the point where seven or eight inmates were sharing a cell originally designed for only three. On 30 August 2005, the prison relocated its inmates to Simpang Renggam Prison in Kluang.

== Post-2005 uses ==
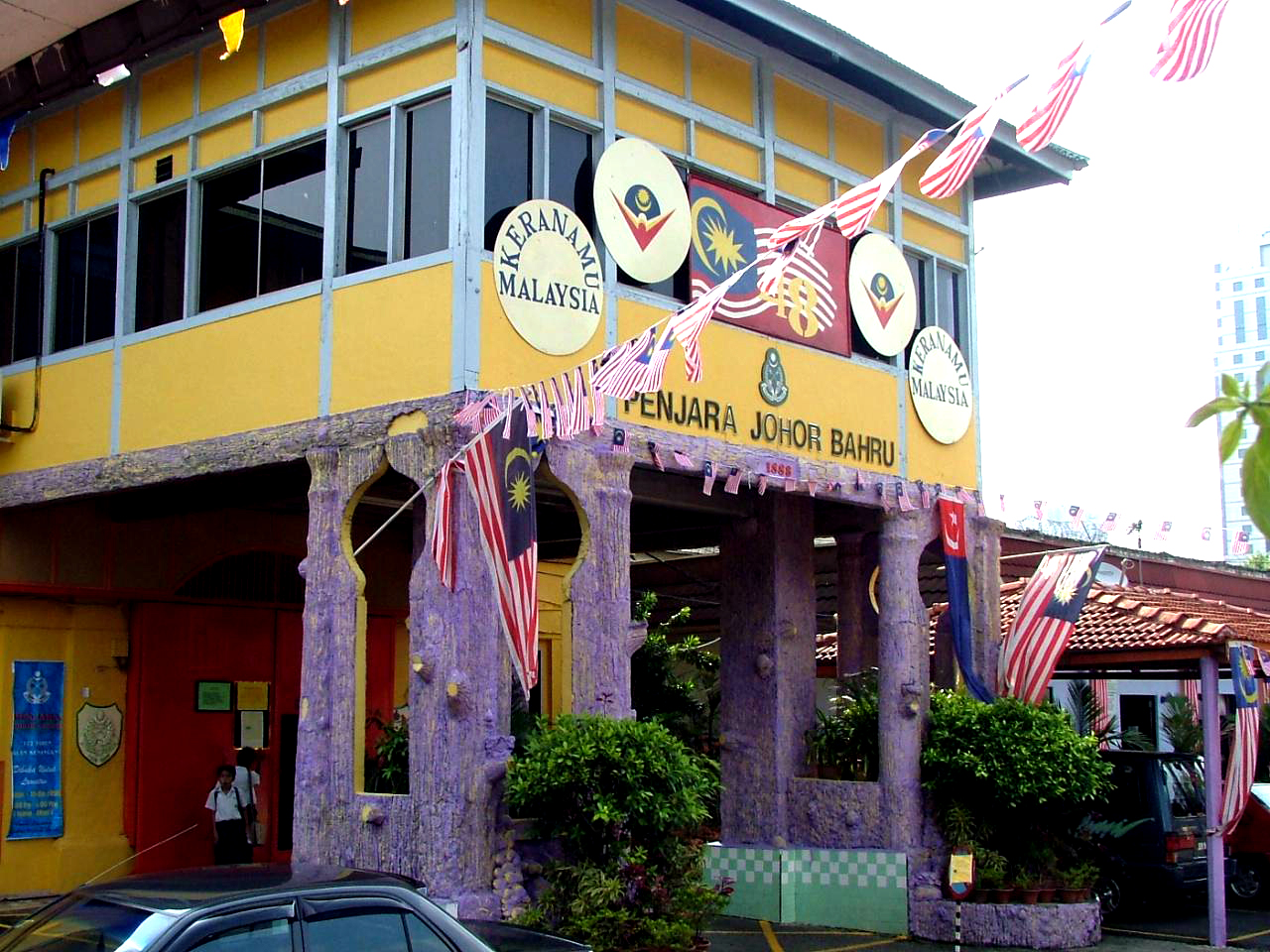
Entrance to the main administrative building

After its relocation in 2005, the prison was opened to the public for an exhibition by the Malaysian Prison Department from 1 September to 15 December 2005. The exhibition was meant to raise public awareness of the conditions of life in prison and it included, among other things, a talk by prison staff, a tour of the prison facilities, a video screening, and a demonstration of whipping on a dummy. The entry fee was 5 ringgit for adults and 2 ringgit for children.

The prison was later briefly used by the Royal Malaysian Police as a lockup and ultimately rented out as a space for motivational courses and team-building events, including paintball games.

As of 2025, the prison has been renamed Kota Jail and transformed into a creative hub hosting pop-up bazaars, art exhibitions, and has a cafe on its premises. For a fee of 5 ringgit (for Malaysians) or 15 ringgit (for foreigners), visitors can also take a tour of the prison.

== Transportation ==
The prison is accessible by BAS.MY (J10, J11, J13, J15, J20, J22 and J100) Shuttle Z00 bus.

== See also ==
- Law enforcement in Malaysia
