= Orders, decorations, and medals of Malaysia =

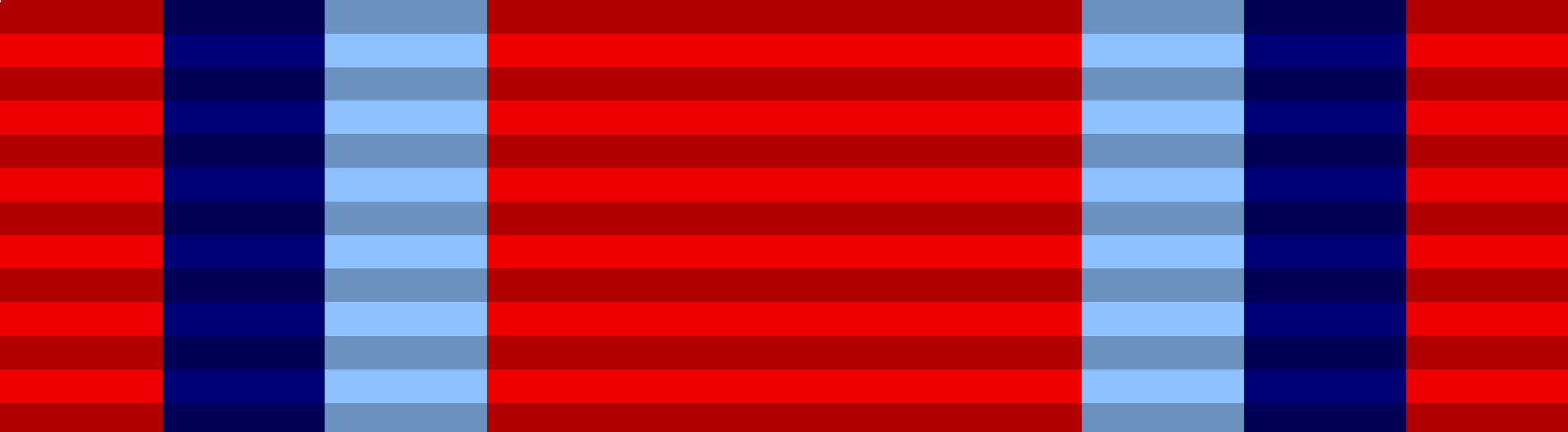

The orders, decorations, and medals of Malaysia comprise a complex system by which Malaysians and qualified foreigners are honoured by the country's sovereign for actions or deeds that benefit their community or the country at large. Modelled on its British predecessor, the orders, decorations, and medals of Malaysia were created after formation of Malaysia. The honour system came to exist earlier during Federation of Malaya. During the British colonial times, honours were given under the British honour system. Johor was the first state to institute its own honours on 31 July 1880. Then, the other Malay states did the same.

The monarch is regarded as the fount of all honours—as he is the only person who may create new national honours—and acts as the Sovereign of all of Malaysia's orders; he will conduct inductions or present medals. In Malaysia, the monarch is the Yang di-Pertuan Agong, who also carries out investitures and distributes awards in the sovereign's name. As such, the administration of the honours system is carried out by the Ceremonial and International Conference Secretariat Division in Putrajaya, which is a part of the Prime Minister's Department. The Yang di-Pertuan Agong sets out via Office of the Keeper of the Rulers' Seal the Conference of Rulers' the order of precedence for the wearing of insignia, decorations, and medals.

The honours system consists of two levels – Federal Honours and State Honours.

== Federal orders, decorations, and medals ==
The Federal Honours are honours given by the Yang Di-Pertuan Agong to the military, police and civilians for service and special contributions to the country.

Precedence and Honorifics
Order	Name (Malay)	Post-nom	Honorific
1	Seri Pahlawan Gagah Perkasa	S.P.	
2	Darjah Kerabat Diraja Malaysia	D.K.M.	
3	Darjah Utama Seri Mahkota Negara	D.M.N.	
4	Seri Maharaja Mangku Negara	S.M.N.	Tun
5	Seri Setia Mahkota Malaysia	S.S.M.	Tun
6	Darjah Bakti	D.B.	
7	Panglima Mangku Negara	P.M.N.	Tan Sri
8	Panglima Setia Mahkota	P.S.M.	Tan Sri
9	Panglima Jasa Negara	P.J.N.	Datuk
10	Panglima Setia Diraja	P.S.D.	Datuk
11	Johan Mangku Negara	J.M.N.	
12	Johan Setia Mahkota	J.S.M.	
13	Johan Setia Diraja	J.S.D.	
14	Kesatria Mangku Negara	K.M.N.	
15	Kesatria Setia Diraja	K.S.D.	
16	Ahli Mangku Negara	A.M.N.	
17	Pingat Pangkuan Negara	P.P.N.	
18	Bentara Setia Diraja	B.S.D.	
19	Panglima Gagah Berani	P.G.B.	
20	Jasa Perkasa Persekutuan	J.P.P.	
21	Pingat Tentera Udara	P.T.U.	
22	Pingat Kebaktian	P.K.	
23	Pingat Khidmat Berbakti	P.K.B.	
24	Pingat Perkhidmatan Cemerlang	P.P.C.	
25	Pingat Perkhidmatan Setia	P.P.S.	
26	Kepujian Perutusan Keberanian	K.P.K.	
27	Pingat Perkhidmatan Am	P.P.A.	
28	Pingat Peringatan Malaysia	P.P.M.	
29	Pingat Negara Bangsa-Bangsa Bersatu	P.N.B.B.	
30	Pingat Jasa Malaysia	P.J.M.	
31	"Pingat Kedaulatan Negara"	P.K.N	
32	"Pingat Jasa Pahlawan Negara"	P.J.P.N	
33	Pingat Pertabalan	P.P.	

Light green denotes orders, decorations, and medals that are not open for nomination application.

=== Honorary orders and medals ===
Ribbon	Name (English/Malay)	Ranks / Post-nom	Instituted	Awarded to/for
	The Star of Honour of the Grand Knight of Valour; Bintang Kehormatan Seri Pahlawan Gagah Perkasa	S.P.	29 July 1960	Founded by Tuanku Hisamuddin Alam Shah as the supreme award for gallantry in the face of the enemy. Subsequent awards being denoted by the use of bars. Recipients and their widows receive state allowances.
	The Most Exalted and Most Illustrious; Order of the Royal Family of Malaysia; Darjah Yang Maha Mulia Utama Kerabat Diraja Malaysia	D.K.M.	18 April 1966	Founded by Tuanku Ismail Nasiruddin Shah. Limited to Malaysian rulers who became Yang di-Pertuan Agong. Limited to 10 recipients
	The Most Exalted; Order of the Crown of the Realm; Darjah Utama Seri Mahkota Negara	D.M.N.	16 August 1958	Founded by Tuanku Abdul Rahman as a reward to Malaysian rulers and their wives, foreign Heads of State and other distinguished individuals. Limited to 30 recipients
	The Most Distinguished; Order of the Defender of the Realm; Darjah Yang Amat Mulia Pangkuan Negara	Grand Commander (S.M.N.); Seri Maharaja Mangku Negara	16 August 1958	Founded by Tuanku Abdul Rahman as a reward for meritorious service to the country. Limited to 25 recipients
	The Most Distinguished; Order of the Defender of the Realm; Darjah Yang Amat Mulia Pangkuan Negara	Commander (P.M.N.); Panglima Mangku Negara	16 August 1958	Founded by Tuanku Abdul Rahman as a reward for meritorious service to the country. Limited to 75 recipients
	The Most Distinguished; Order of the Defender of the Realm; Darjah Yang Amat Mulia Pangkuan Negara	Companion (J.M.N.); Johan Mangku Negara	16 August 1958	Founded by Tuanku Abdul Rahman as a reward for meritorious service to the country.
	The Most Distinguished; Order of the Defender of the Realm; Darjah Yang Amat Mulia Pangkuan Negara	Officer (K.M.N.); Kesatria Mangku Negara	16 August 1958	Founded by Tuanku Abdul Rahman as a reward for meritorious service to the country.
	The Most Distinguished; Order of the Defender of the Realm; Darjah Yang Amat Mulia Pangkuan Negara	Member (A.M.N.); Ahli Mangku Negara	16 August 1958	Founded by Tuanku Abdul Rahman as a reward for meritorious service to the country.
	The Most Distinguished; Order of the Defender of the Realm; Darjah Yang Amat Mulia Pangkuan Negara	Medal (P.P.N.); Pingat Pangkuan Negara	9 August 1960	Founded by Tuanku Hisamuddin Alam Shah as a reward for meritorious service to the country
	The Most Distinguished; Order of Loyalty to the Crown of Malaysia; Darjah Yang Mulia Setia Mahkota Malaysia	Grand Commander (S.S.M.); Seri Setia Mahkota Malaysia	15 April 1966	Founded by Tuanku Ismail Nasiruddin Shah conferred in recognition of meritorious service in the civil service, those persons of high social standing, or those holding positions of authority. Limited to 35 recipients
	The Most Distinguished; Order of Loyalty to the Crown of Malaysia; Darjah Yang Mulia Setia Mahkota Malaysia	Commander (P.S.M.); Panglima Setia Mahkota	15 April 1966	Founded by Tuanku Ismail Nasiruddin Shah conferred in recognition of meritorious service in the civil service, those persons of high social standing, or those holding positions of authority. Limited to 1.000 recipients
	The Most Distinguished; Order of Loyalty to the Crown of Malaysia; Darjah Yang Mulia Setia Mahkota Malaysia	Companion (J.S.M.); Johan Setia Mahkota	15 April 1966	Founded by Tuanku Ismail Nasiruddin Shah conferred in recognition of meritorious service in the civil service, those persons of high social standing, or those holding positions of authority.
	The Order of Merit; Darjah Bakti	D.B.	26 June 1975	Founded by Tuanku Abdul Halim Mu'adzam Shah as a reward for services to science, the arts, and to humanity. Restricted to ten recipients of Malaysian nationality only
	The Distinguished Order of Meritorious Service; Darjah Yang Mulia Jasa Negara	Commander (P.J.N.); Panglima Jasa Negara	2 May 1995	Founded by Tuanku Jaafar as a general reward for meritorious service. Limited to 1.500 recipients
	The Most Distinguished; Order of Loyalty to the Royal Family of Malaysia; Darjah Yang Amat Mulia Dihormati Setia Diraja	Commander (P.S.D.); Panglima Setia Diraja	3 September 1965	Founded by Tuanku Syed Putra and awarded at the discretion of the King of Malaysia. Modified and extended on 7 January 1993; Limited to 200 recipients
	The Most Distinguished; Order of Loyalty to the Royal Family of Malaysia; Darjah Yang Amat Mulia Dihormati Setia Diraja	Companion (J.S.D.); Johan Setia Diraja	3 September 1965	Founded by Tuanku Syed Putra and awarded at the discretion of the King of Malaysia. Modified and extended on 7 January 1993
	The Most Distinguished; Order of Loyalty to the Royal Family of Malaysia; Darjah Yang Amat Mulia Dihormati Setia Diraja	Officer (K.S.D.); Kesatria Setia Diraja	1993	Founded by Tuanku Syed Putra and awarded at the discretion of the King of Malaysia. Modified and extended on 7 January 1993
	The Most Distinguished; Order of Loyalty to the Royal Family of Malaysia; Darjah Yang Amat Mulia Dihormati Setia Diraja	Herald (B.S.D.); Bentara Setia Diraja	1993	Founded by Tuanku Syed Putra and awarded at the discretion of the King of Malaysia. Modified and extended on 7 January 1993
	Star of the Commander of Valour; Panglima Gagah Berani	P.G.B.	29 July 1960	Founded by Tuanku Hisamuddin Alam Shah as a reward for extreme courage and gallantry in combat
	Federation Gallantry Star; Jasa Perkasa Persekutuan	J.P.P.	29 July 1960	Founded by Tuanku Hisamuddin Alam Shah as a reward for individuals who have shown extraordinary heroism and courage on the battlefield
	Medal of Merit; Pingat Kebaktian	P.K.	17 July 1968	Founded by Tuanku Ismail Nasiruddin as bestowed to recognize and appreciate the long service and commendable conduct of members of the Malaysian Armed Forces and the Royal Malaysian Police.
	Active Service Medal; Pingat Khidmat Berbakti	P.K.B.	29 July 1960	Founded by Tuanku Hisamuddin Alam Shah as a reward for long service and good conduct
	Distinguished Service Medal; Pingat Perkhidmatan Cemerlang	P.P.C.	28 June 2011	This is awarded in recognition and appreciation to public sector officials and employees who have served in their service with excellence as well as excelling in their contributions outside of their official duties for the country and society. Founded by Tuanku Mizan Zainal Abidin.
(serving for 15 years or more) (Serving no less than 18 years)	Loyal Service Medal; Pingat Perkhidmatan Setia	P.P.S.	29 July 1970	Founded by Sultan Ismail Nasiruddin Shah as bestowed to recognize and appreciate the service, dedication and sacrifice of members of the Malaysian Armed Forces, Royal Malaysian Police and Malaysian Prison Department who have long served loyally and commendably throughout their service.
	Mention in Despatches; Kepujian Perutusan Keberanian	K.P.K.	29 July 1960	Founded by Tuanku Hisamuddin Alam Shah as awarded to members of the Malaysian Armed Forces and the Royal Malaysian Police who have shown or done something considered brave and worthy of recognition, but the standard of bravery is not that high to be awarded a medal.
(30 days on duty) (Serving no less than 10 years)	General Service Medal; Pingat Perkhidmatan Am	P.P.A.	29 July 1960	Founded by Tuanku Hisamuddin Alam Shah as awarded for general services in the Malaysian Armed Forces, Royal Malaysian Police and Malaysian Prison Department.
	Malaysian Commemorative Medal; Pingat Peringatan Malaysia	Gold (P.P.M.); Pingat Emas Peringatan Malaysia	1965	Founded by Tuanku Syed Putra as a reward for meritorious service in the formation of Malaysia in 1963
	Malaysian Commemorative Medal; Pingat Peringatan Malaysia	Silver (P.P.M.); Pingat Perak Peringatan Malaysia	1965	Founded by Tuanku Syed Putra as a reward for meritorious service in the formation of Malaysia in 1963
	Malaysian Commemorative Medal; Pingat Peringatan Malaysia	Bronze (P.P.M.); Pingat Gangsa Peringatan Malaysia	1965	Founded by Tuanku Syed Putra as a reward for meritorious service in the formation of Malaysia in 1963
	United Nations Missions Service Medal; Pingat Perkhidmatan Negara Bangsa-Bangsa Bersatu	P.N.B.B.	1994	Founded by Tuanku Jaffar, this is awarded to Malaysian Armed Forces and Royal Malaysian Police personnel who serve under a United Nations (UN) mission overseas for more than 90 days.
	National Sovereignty Medal; Pingat Kedaulatan Negara	P.K.N	26 January 2015	The PKN is a special appreciation medal awarded to security officers and personnel, as well as civil servants who had served during Ops Daulat in Sabah.
	Installation Medal of the Sultan of Terengganu as 4th Yang di-Pertuan Agong; Pingat Pertabalan Yang di-Pertuan Agong IV	P.P. IV	1966	Founded by Tuanku Ismail Nasiruddin Shah to commemorate his installation as Yang di-Pertuan Agong
	Installation Medal of the Sultan of Kedah as 5th Yang di-Pertuan Agong; Pingat Pertabalan Yang di-Pertuan Agong V	P.P. V	1971	Founded by Tuanku Abdul Halim Mu'adzam Shah to commemorate his installation as Yang di-Pertuan Agong
	Installation Medal of the Sultan of Kelantan as 6th Yang di-Pertuan Agong; Pingat Pertabalan Yang di-Pertuan Agong VI	P.P. VI	1976	Founded by Tuanku Yahya Petra to commemorate his installation as Yang di-Pertuan Agong
	Installation Medal of the Sultan of Pahang as 7th Yang di-Pertuan Agong; Pingat Pertabalan Yang di-Pertuan Agong VII	P.P. VII	1980	Founded by Tuanku Ahmad Shah to commemorate his installation as Yang di-Pertuan Agong
	Installation Medal of the Sultan of Johor as 8th Yang di-Pertuan Agong; Pingat Pertabalan Yang di-Pertuan Agong VIII	P.P. VIII	1984	Founded by Tuanku Iskandar to commemorate his installation as Yang di-Pertuan Agong
	Installation Medal of the Sultan of Perak as 9th Yang di-Pertuan Agong; Pingat Pertabalan Yang di-Pertuan Agong IX	P.P. IX	1989	Founded by Tuanku Azlan Shah to commemorate his installation as Yang di-Pertuan Agong
	Installation Medal of the Yang di-Pertuan Besar of Negeri Sembilan as 10th Yang di-Pertuan Agong; Pingat Pertabalan Yang di-Pertuan Agong X	P.P. X	1994	Founded by Tuanku Jaafar to commemorate his installation as Yang di-Pertuan Agong
	Installation Medal of the Sultan of Selangor as 11th Yang di-Pertuan Agong; Pingat Pertabalan Yang di-Pertuan Agong XI	P.P. XI	1999	Founded by Tuanku Salahuddin Abdul Aziz Shah to commemorate his installation as Yang di-Pertuan Agong
	Installation Medal of the Raja of Perlis as 12th Yang di-Pertuan Agong; Pingat Pertabalan Yang di-Pertuan Agong XII	P.P. XII	2002	Founded by Tuanku Syed Sirajuddin to commemorate his installation as Yang di-Pertuan Agong
	Installation Medal of the Sultan of Terengganu as 13th Yang di-Pertuan Agong; Pingat Pertabalan Yang di-Pertuan Agong XIII	P.P. XIII	2007	Founded by Tuanku Mizan Zainal Abidin to commemorate his installation as Yang di-Pertuan Agong
	Installation Medal of the Sultan of Kedah as 14th Yang di-Pertuan Agong; Pingat Pertabalan Yang di-Pertuan Agong XIV	P.P. XIV	2012	Founded by Tuanku Abdul Halim Mu'adzam Shah to commemorate his installation as Yang di-Pertuan Agong
	Installation Medal of the Sultan of Kelantan as 15th Yang di-Pertuan Agong; Pingat Pertabalan Yang di-Pertuan Agong XV	P.P. XV	2017	Founded by Sultan Muhammad V to commemorate his installation as Yang di-Pertuan Agong
	Installation Medal of the Sultan of Pahang as 16th Yang di-Pertuan Agong; Pingat Pertabalan Yang di-Pertuan Agong XVI	P.P. XVI	2019	Founded by Al-Sultan Abdullah Ri’ayatuddin Al-Mustafa Billah Shah to commemorate his installation as Yang di-Pertuan Agong
	Installation Medal of the Sultan of Johor as 17th Yang di-Pertuan Agong; Pingat Pertabalan Yang di-Pertuan Agong XVII	P.P. XVII	2024	Founded by Sultan Ibrahim to commemorate his installation as Yang di-Pertuan Agong

=== Military orders and medals ===
Ribbon	Name (English/Malay)	Ranks / Post-nom	Instituted	Awarded to/for
	The Most Gallant Order of Military Service; Darjah Kepahlawanan Angkatan Tentera	Courageous Commander (P.G.A.T.); Panglima Gagah Angkatan Tentera	16 September 1983	Founded by Tuanku Ahmad Shah to reward exceptional service in the Malaysian Armed Forces
	The Most Gallant Order of Military Service; Darjah Kepahlawanan Angkatan Tentera	Loyal Commander (P.S.A.T.); Panglima Setia Angkatan Tentera	16 September 1983	Founded by Tuanku Ahmad Shah to reward exceptional service in the Malaysian Armed Forces
	The Most Gallant Order of Military Service; Darjah Kepahlawanan Angkatan Tentera	Warrior (P.A.T.); Pahlawan Angkatan Tentera	16 September 1983	Founded by Tuanku Ahmad Shah to reward exceptional service in the Malaysian Armed Forces
	The Most Gallant Order of Military Service; Darjah Kepahlawanan Angkatan Tentera	Officer (K.A.T.); Kesatria Angkatan Tentera	16 September 1983	Founded by Tuanku Ahmad Shah to reward exceptional service in the Malaysian Armed Forces
	The Most Gallant Order of Military Service; Darjah Kepahlawanan Angkatan Tentera	Herald (B.A.T.); Bentara Angkatan Tentera	16 September 1983	Founded by Tuanku Ahmad Shah to reward exceptional service in the Malaysian Armed Forces
	Air Force Medal; Pingat Tentera Udara	P.T.U.	17 July 1968	Founded by Tuanku Ismail Nasiruddin as a reward for members of the Royal Malaysian Air Force
	Malaysian Service Medal; Pingat Jasa Malaysia	P.J.M.	3 March 2004	Founded by Tuanku Syed Sirajuddin as a reward for the service of Malaysian soldiers, British and Commonwealth soldiers, sailors and aircraftmen who participated in the Malayan Emergency and later on the Indonesian-Malaysian Confrontation

=== Police orders and medals ===
Ribbon	Name (English/Malay)	Ranks / Post-nom	Instituted	Awarded to/for
	The Most Gallant Police Order; Darjah Kepahlawanan Pasukan Polis	Courageous Commander (P.G.P.P.); Panglima Gagah Pasukan Polis	1993	Founded by Tuanku Jaafar to reward exceptional services in Royal Malaysia Police
	The Most Gallant Police Order; Darjah Kepahlawanan Pasukan Polis	Loyal Commander (P.S.P.P.); Panglima Setia Pasukan Polis	1993	Founded by Tuanku Jaafar to reward exceptional services in Royal Malaysia Police
	The Most Gallant Police Order; Darjah Kepahlawanan Pasukan Polis	Warrior (P.P.P.); Pahlawan Pasukan Polis	1993	Founded by Tuanku Jaafar to reward exceptional services in Royal Malaysia Police
	The Most Gallant Police Order; Darjah Kepahlawanan Pasukan Polis	Officer (K.P.P.); Kesatria Pasukan Polis	1993	Founded by Tuanku Jaafar to reward exceptional services in Royal Malaysia Police
	The Most Gallant Police Order; Darjah Kepahlawanan Pasukan Polis	Herald (B.P.P.); Bentara Pasukan Polis	1993	Founded by Tuanku Jaafar to reward exceptional services in Royal Malaysia Police
	Police Gallantry Medal; Pingat Keberanian Polis	P.K.P.	1993	Founded by Tuanku Jaafar as a reward for taking life-risking situations.
	Presentation of Police Colours Medal; Pingat Keanugerahan Polis	P.K.	1993	Founded by Tuanku Jaafar as a reward for participating in a parade during Police Day.
	National Hero Service Medal; Pingat Jasa Pahlawan Negara	P.J.P.N	5 February 2014	The PJPN is a medal given to members of the Royal Malaysia Police in recognition of their heroic service for the country. The recipients served the country during the Malayan Emergency era which lasted from 12 July 1948 to 31 July 1960, the Communist insurgency from 17 June 1968 to 2 December 1989 in Peninsular Malaysia and in Sabah and Sarawak from 1962 to 17 October 1990 (Emergency Service era).

Service Ribbon

1. 30 years Service Ribbon
2. 20 years Service Ribbon
3. 10 years Service Ribbon

Anniversary Ribbon Bar

1. RMP Bicenntenial Ribbon Bar
2. "Royal" Title 50th Anniversary Ribbon Bar

=== Scouts Association of Malaysia awards and honours ===
Ribbon	Name (English/Malay)	Ranks / Post-nominal	Instituted	Awarded to/for
	Hero's Star; Bintang Pahlawan			This is the highest award given to Scout leaders and members who have served in saving the lives and property of the surrounding community.
	Star of the Paddy Spirit; Bintang Semangat Padi	BSP-E (Gold/Emas)		This is the highest award which is only presented to distinguished figures. This very limited award makes it something most exclusive. Therefore, the first class recipients who are eligible to receive it are only from among the state and national leaders. The second class recipients who are eligible to receive it are only from among the leaders of the state, country and Scout leaders who have much contributed.
	Star of the Paddy Spirit; Bintang Semangat Padi	BSP-P (Silver/Perak)		This is the highest award which is only presented to distinguished figures. This very limited award makes it something most exclusive. Therefore, the first class recipients who are eligible to receive it are only from among the state and national leaders. The second class recipients who are eligible to receive it are only from among the leaders of the state, country and Scout leaders who have much contributed.
	Star of the Forest Spirit; Bintang Semangat Rimba	BSR-E (Gold/Emas)		This is the third highest award which is only presented to figures who have given commendable service and devotion to the Scout movement. The second class star is the fourth highest award which is only presented to figures who have given commendable service and devotion to the Scout movement.
	Star of the Forest Spirit; Bintang Semangat Rimba	BSR-P (Silver/Perak)		This is the third highest award which is only presented to figures who have given commendable service and devotion to the Scout movement. The second class star is the fourth highest award which is only presented to figures who have given commendable service and devotion to the Scout movement.
	Scout Service Medal; Pingat Jasa Pengakap	PJP		National Chief Scout's personal award presented to warranted leaders who have contributed outstanding service and devotion on the development of Scouting at the state, national and international levels.
	Meritorious Service Medal; Pingat Perkhidmatan Gemilang	PPG		This is awarded to warranted leaders who have contributed outstanding service and devotion on the development of Scouting at the district, state, national and international levels and are highly praised, have a loyal nature and attitude and exhibit admirable behavior.
	Distinguished Service Medal; Pingat Perkhidmatan Cemerlang	PPC		This is awarded to warranted leaders who have contributed outstanding service and devotion on the development of Scouting at the district, state, national and international levels and are highly praised, have a loyal nature and attitude and exhibit admirable behavior.
	Long Service Medal; Pingat Perkhidmatan Lama	PPL		This is awarded to warranted leaders who have served and served continuously well for not less than 20 years at the Group, District, State and National levels and have noble conduct and character.
	Loyal Service Medal; Pingat Perkhidmatan Setia	PPS		This is awarded to warranted leaders and individuals who have provided excellent, honest, trustworthy and loyal service for not less than 10 years or in a shorter period at the discretion of the Awards Committee of the Scouts Association of Malaysia.
	Good Service Medal; Pingat Perkhidmatan Baik	PPB		This is awarded to warranted leaders and individuals such as the Local Associations of Scouts, districts, states and countries who always carry out their duties well and help the success of the Scout movement at their respective levels with honesty, trust, loyal and persistent not less than 5 years.
	Chief Scout's Certificate of Commendation; Sijil Kepujian Ketua Pengakap Negara	SKKPN		This is awarded to warranted leaders and have provided commendable and continuous service for 12 months and have good behavior and character. It can also be awarded to lay members and the Local Association of Scouts of the district, state and individuals who greatly assist and support the Scout movement at the Group, District, State and National levels.
	Medal for Excellence in Education; Pingat Kecemerlangan Pendidikan	PKP	2009	Instituted by the Chief Scout for excellence in education and scouting at six categories: degree, diploma, STPM, SPM, PMR, UPSR
	Scouts of Malaysia Centennial Commemorative Medal; Pingat Peringatan 100 Tahun Pengakap Malaysia	PPPM	1 August 2008	This is awarded in conjunction with the centenary of Scouting in Malaysia to figures or individuals who have given their service to the Scout movement.
	International Friendship Medal; Pingat Persahabatan Antarabangsa	PPA-E (Gold/Emas)		
	International Friendship Medal; Pingat Persahabatan Antarabangsa	PPA-P (Silver/Perak)		
	International Friendship Medal; Pingat Persahabatan Antarabangsa	PPA-G (Bronze/Gangsa)		

=== Girl Guides Association of Malaysia awards and honours ===
Ribbon	Name (English/Malay)	Ranks / Post-nominal	Level	Awarded to/for
	Paduka Srikandi Award; Anugerah Paduka Srikandi	1	National	President and Deputy President
	Srikandi Award; Anugerah Srikandi	2	National	Members of girl guide who have rendered outstanding service to the association who can become a role model in voluntary work.
	Layang-Layang Award; Anugerah Layang-Layang	3	National	Registered active members
	Agok Bakti-Lebah Award; Anugerah Agok Bakti-Lebah	4	National	Registered active members
	Medal of Service; Pingat Jasa	5	National	Registered active members
	Star of Honour; Bintang Kehormatan	6	National	Givers and non-members
	20-Year Long Service Medal; Pingat Jasa Lama 20 Tahun	7	National	Registered active members
	Medal of Stalk of Paddy; Pingat Tangkai Padi	8	Branch	Registered active members
	Thank You Medal; Pingat Terima Kasih	9	Branch	Givers and non-members
	15-Year Long Service Medal; Pingat Jasa Lama 15 Tahun	10	Branch	Registered active members
	10-Year Long Service Medal; Pingat Jasa Lama 10 Tahun	11	District	Registered active members

=== St. John Ambulance of Malaysia awards and honours ===
Ribbon	Name (English/Malay)	Ranks / Post-nominal	Instituted	Awarded to/for
	Eminent Order of Loyalty; Darjah Setia Utama	1	1997	This award is conferred on senior officers and individuals of the highest standing in society who have contributed excellent and outstanding service. The recipient of this award should possess influential, noble and respectable status in society. This award is limited to ten living persons.
	Order of Supreme Merit; Darjah Bakti Perkasa	2	1997	This award is conferred on officers and individuals who hold high status in society and have contributed excellent service. This award is limited to thirty living persons. This Category 2 award consists of a ribbon in SJAM colours with a Bakti Perkasa badge hung at the end of the collarette. This award is worn around the neck. On Duty uniform, a ribbon consists of SJAM colours and two gold stars and is worn above the left pocket.
	Meritorious Service Medal; Pingat Jasa Gemilang	3	1997	This is conferred on SJAM officers and individuals who have contributed unique and valuable service to the organisation.
	Outstanding Service Medal; Pingat Jasa Cemerlang	4	1997	This is conferred on SJAM officers and individuals who have contributed outstanding service to the organisation.
	Distinguished Service Medal; Pingat Jasa Terpuji	5	1997	This is conferred on SJAM officers and individuals who have exhibited competence and undertaken praiseworthy deeds. The recipient must possess good character and be of good conduct.
	Life Saving Medal; Pingat Gagah Berani	Gold	1874	The Life Saving Medal was instituted in 1874 to enable the Order to honour those who saved, or attempted to save the life of another and who placed themselves at imminent personal risk in doing so. It is not necessary to have performed first aid.
	Life Saving Medal; Pingat Gagah Berani	Silver	1874	The Life Saving Medal was instituted in 1874 to enable the Order to honour those who saved, or attempted to save the life of another and who placed themselves at imminent personal risk in doing so. It is not necessary to have performed first aid.
	Life Saving Medal; Pingat Gagah Berani	Bronze	1874	The Life Saving Medal was instituted in 1874 to enable the Order to honour those who saved, or attempted to save the life of another and who placed themselves at imminent personal risk in doing so. It is not necessary to have performed first aid.
Gold Silver	Centenary Medal; Pingat Peringatan Ulang Tahun Ke-100	Gold	2008	SJAM commemorates its one hundred years in Malaysia by issuing SJAM Centenary Medals to all qualified officers, members and members of the public who have made significant contributions to the organisation.
Gold Silver	Centenary Medal; Pingat Peringatan Ulang Tahun Ke-100	Silver	2008	SJAM commemorates its one hundred years in Malaysia by issuing SJAM Centenary Medals to all qualified officers, members and members of the public who have made significant contributions to the organisation.
Gold Silver	Centenary Medal; Pingat Peringatan Ulang Tahun Ke-100	Bronze	2008	SJAM commemorates its one hundred years in Malaysia by issuing SJAM Centenary Medals to all qualified officers, members and members of the public who have made significant contributions to the organisation.
	111th Anniversary Commemorative Medal; Pingat Peringatan Ulang Tahun Ke-111		2020	SJAM commemorates its 111 years in Malaysia by issuing SJAM Centenary Medals to all qualified officers, members and members of the public who have made significant contributions to the organisation for at least three years.
	Five Years Service Medal; Pingat Perkhidmatan Lima Tahun		2004	In 2004, the National St. John Council of Malaysia introduced the Five Years Service Medal to recognise members and officers who have performed efficiently for at least five years. This medal was introduced in recognition of the efficient service of SJAM members and officers who have been diligently discharging their duties. This award precedes the Service Medal of the Order of St. John, which is awarded for ten years active and efficient service.
	Commander-in-Chief's Award; Anugerah Pemerintah Agung		2003	The Commander-in-Chief's Award is presented by the Commander-in-Chief to individuals and entities who exhibit outstanding qualities and who have given remarkable service to SJAM.

=== Malaysia Civil Defence Force ===
Ribbon	Name (English/Malay)	Ranks / Post-nominal	Instituted	Awarded to/for
	Civil Defence Service Medal; Pingat Perkhidmatan Pertahanan Awam			Awarded to Civil Defence Service Officers who have completed the Basic Service Course and have a clean record.

== States and federal territories orders, decorations, and medals ==
The Malaysian states each have their own internal honours system, though they differ in some ways from their federal counterpart. Johor was the first to create its own honours in 1880. However, after the establishment of the Malaysian honours system in 1963, other states moved to initiate their own systems after the federal government refused to do so on their behalf. An agreement was eventually reached on the placement of the state honours in the Malaysian order of precedence for orders, decorations, and medals.

== Imperial and foreign honours ==
State honours bestowed upon a Malaysian by a foreign government must be approved by the Government of Malaysia before the insignia, decoration, or medal may be worn.

== See also ==
- List of post-nominal letters (Malaysia)
- Malay styles and titles
