= Taiping Prison =

Prison in Larut, Matang and Selama, Perak, Malaysia

Coordinates: 4°51′38″N 100°44′52″E

Taiping Prison Penjara Taiping
- Interactive map of Taiping Prison; Penjara Taiping
- Location: Jalan Taming Sari, Taiping, Perak, Malaysia
- Security class: Medium-security
- Opened: 1879
- Managed by: Malaysian Prison Department

Taiping Prison (Malay: Penjara Taiping), formerly known as Larut Prison and Taiping Training Centre, is a prison in Taiping, Perak, Malaysia. Established in 1879, it is the first and oldest modern prison complex in the country.

== History ==
In 1881, Sikh warders were brought in from India to assist Malay warders while vocational trainers were brought in from Hong Kong to introduce useful industry in the prison. In 1882, there was an exercise to place prison inmates into categories. In 1889, a European warder was appointed. With the establishment of the Federated Malay States, Taiping Prison became the detention centre for prisoners with long sentences from Perak, Pahang, Negeri Sembilan and Selangor. In 1923, the system of "Visiting Justices" was introduced. Prison industry had been developed and included printing works, cloth production, sewing and rattan and ironworking. In 1924, stoneworking was halted and replaced with coconut dehusking. During the Japanese occupation from 1941 to 1945, Taiping Prison was used as a public prison and also a prisoner-of-war detention centre. All records of the prison and its inmates during this period were destroyed by the end of the war.
