= Malaysian Prison Department =

Malaysian Prison Department Jabatan Penjara Malaysia جابتن ڤنجارا مليسيا
- Logo of the Malaysian Prison Department
- Motto: Mesra, Ikhlas dan Berbakti (Friendly, Sincere and Dedicated)

Agency overview
- Formed: 19 March 1790; 236 years ago

Jurisdictional structure
- National agency (Operations jurisdiction): Malaysia
- Operations jurisdiction: Malaysia
- Area: 329,847 km (127,355 sq mi)
- Population: 27,544,000
- Legal jurisdiction: National
- Governing body: Government of Malaysia
- Constituting instrument: Prison Act 1995

Operational structure
- Headquarters: Kajang, Selangor, Malaysia
- Elected officer responsible: Saifuddin Nasution Ismail, Minister of Home Affairs
- Agency executives: Abdul Aziz Abdul Razak, Commissioner General of Prison; Vacant, Deputy Commissioner General of Prison (Security & Correctional); Abdul Kadir Rais, Deputy Commissioner General of Prison (Management); Ibrisam Abdul Rahman, Deputy Commissioner General of Prison (Community)
- Parent agency: Ministry of Home Affairs
- Units: Trup Tindakan Cepat

Website
- www.prison.gov.my

The Malaysian Prison Department (Malay: Jabatan Penjara Malaysia; Jawi: جابتن ڤنجارا مليسيا; ), is a department under Malaysia's Ministry of Home Affairs responsible for prisons where offenders sentenced by the courts are held. These prisons also serve as detention and recovery institutions.

The department is headquartered in the Malaysia Prison Complex (Kompleks Penjara Kajang) in Kajang, Selangor.

== History ==
During British colonial rule and the Japanese occupation from 1941 to 1945, penal institutions were the responsibility of the individual states' governments with their respective regulations. In the Straits Settlements, a Superintendent based in Singapore served as the supervisor and inspected the institutions under his jurisdiction.

The Straits Settlements were the earliest to build their own prisons while the Federated Malay States did so only after the British set up a responsible department. Taiping Prison, the largest at the time, was built in 1879. Prisons were built with the main purpose of bringing suffering to the inmates in the hope that it would deter people from committing crimes.

In 1881, Sikh warders were brought in from India to assist Malay warders while vocational instructors from Hong Kong were brought in too an effort to introduce trades to the inmates. Among the earliest of these were rock breaking and carpentry. An attempt was made to categorise the inmates in 1882. Then, in 1889, European warders were appointed at some prisons.

With the formation of the Federated Malay States, Taiping Prison became a detention centre for long-term prisoners from Perak, Pahang, Negeri Sembilan and Selangor. In 1923, a visiting justice system was introduced and prison industries expanded to include printing work, weaving, sewing, rattan weaving, and metalwork. Rock-breaking work was abolished in 1924 and replaced with the pounding of coconut husks.

During the Japanese occupation from 1941 to 1945, the Imperial Japanese Army also used the prisons for housing prisoners-of-war (POWs). All records of the prisons and the POWs for this period were subsequently destroyed by the Japanese by the end of the war.

After the war, the Prison Office was established to administer all prisons in Malaya. The post-war era saw the return of peace, and modern administrative methods were introduced. The 1948 Malayan Emergency resulted in an increase in inmate numbers, which in turn caused overcrowding in the prisons. This disrupted the development of the prison system and it was only towards the end of 1949 when peace returned that prison development could be carried out smoothly.

The Prisons Ordinance 1952 and the Prisons Regulations 1953, based on the "modern treatment" concept, were introduced to replace old legislation. In 1953, the Criminal Justice Bill was passed, abolishing the use of the cat o' nine tails for corporal punishment and replacing the term "penal servitude" with "prison".

Following Independence Day in 1957, the first Prisons Commissioner was appointed to take charge of the administration of all prisons in Malaya. In 1963, with the formation of Malaysia, prisons in Sabah and Sarawak came under the jurisdiction of the Prisons Department.

On 2 November 1995, the Prison Act 1995 was introduced to replace the former Prison Act which in turn was superseded on 1 September 2000 by the Prison Regulations 2000. The previous acts and regulations had been in use for a long time, thus changes and reforms were necessary to meet current needs and demands to streamline prison management and administration. The Malaysian Prison Department also carries out capital punishment in the form of long-drop hanging, and corporal punishment in the form of whipping with a rotan.

In an era of development and modernisation, the Malaysian Prison Department realises that it should not to be content with its past achievements, but should instead move forward and innovate in order to assist the prison administration in dealing with modern culture through criminology, penology and overall social control.

== Insignia ==
1. The fourteen-point star represents the 13 States and the Federal Government of Malaysia, while the star and the crescent symbolise Islam, the official religion of Malaysia.
2. The crossed keys symbolise the authority and responsibility delegated by the department in the performance of its duties.
3. The paddy flower symbolises solidarity and close co-operation by multiracial staff at various levels in the hierarchy.
4. The green background, the official colour of the Prisons Department, signifies allegiance to the Malaysian leader.

== Motto ==
=== Cheerful, Sincere and Dedicated ===
Shall faithfully carry out departmental duties to uphold the national criminal legal system and shoulder the task of rehabilitation of offenders entrusted upon the department by the nation with full responsibility and dedication.

=== Green colour ===
Symbolises the objective of the department to reform citizens who have lapsed into moral decay and turn them into productive individuals who are once again able to fit into society as useful citizens able to fulfill their social obligations.

=== Sketch Heart and Hand ===
Symbolises the commitment by society to re-accommodate ex-convicts into social institutions without any kind of prejudice which may jeopardise their rehabilitation programme.

=== Silver background ===
Symbolises the sincerity of the departments management system in generating commitment and co-operation among society at large, offender families and the department to ensure the success of rehabilitation programmes.

== Organisational structure ==
=== Prison heads ===
Appointment	Rank	Abbreviation	Name
Commissioner General of Prison	Commissioner General of Prison	KJP	Y'Bhg Dato Hj Nordin Bin Mohamad
Deputy Commissioner General of Prison	Deputy Commissioner General of Prison (1)	TKJP	Y'Bhg Dato' Haji Abdul Aziz Bin Abdul Razak
Deputy Commissioner General of Prison	Deputy Commissioner General of Prison (2)	TKJP	Abdul Kadir Bin Hj Rais
Deputy Commissioner General of Prison	Deputy Commissioner General of Prison (3)	TKJP	Y'Bhg Dato Ibrisham Abd Rahman
Director of Perlis Prison	Senior Assistant Commissioner of Prison	PKK	Mat Johir bin Asin @ Hashim
Director of Kedah Prison	Deputy Commissioner of Prison	TKP	Sabri Yaakob
Director of Penang Prison	Deputy Commissioner of Prison	TKP	Roslan Mohamad
Director of Perak Prison	Deputy Commissioner of Prison	TKP	Tan Tian Heng
Director of Kelantan Prison	Deputy Commissioner of Prison	TKP	Hamzani bin Che Ibrahim
Director of Terengganu Prison	Deputy Commissioner of Prison	TKP	Ahmad Saidi Hamzah
Director of Pahang Prison	Commissioner of Prison	KP	Dato' Ab Basir bin Mohamad
Director of Kuala Lumpur Prison	Commissioner of Prison	KP	Y'Bhg Dato Sakeri Bin Dollah
Director of Selangor Prison	Commissioner of Prison	KP	Y'Bhg Dato Sakeri Bin Dollah
Director of Negeri Sembilan Prison	Senior Assistant Commissioner of Prison	PKK	PKK Abd Rahman bin Taib
Director of Malacca Prison	Deputy Commissioner of Prison	TKP	Ku Nawawi
Director of Johore Prison	Commissioner of Prison	KP	Abd. Wahab Kassim
Director of Sabah Prison	Deputy Commissioner of Prison	TKP	Hajah Nora Binti Musa
Director of Sarawak Prison	Deputy Commissioner of Prison	TKP	Rosidek Bin Musa

=== Specialised units ===
==== Control and Prevention Unit ====
The Control and Prevention Unit, known in Malay as Unit Kawalan dan Pencegahan (UKP), is the paramilitary arm of the Prison Department, tasked with maintaining order and security within prison facilities.

The UKP's duties include:

- Patrolling prison premises
- Preventing the smuggling of contraband into prisons
- Controlling riots and ensuring order among inmates
- Inspecting newly arrived prisoners
- Managing internal gate controls within prison facilities

UKP recruits from the ranks of prison officers, favouring individuals with larger, more robust builds due to the physical demands of the role, including the need to overpower inmates during inspections. Members of this unit are identified by their maroon berets and their black-and-white camouflage combat uniforms.

This unit functions much like an infantry unit, adapted to the unique challenges of correctional environments.

== List of leaders ==
=== Commissioners general ===
#	Commissioner General	In office	Left office	Time in office
1.	Captain Es Lilley	1 April 1946	11 September 1949	3 years, 163 days
2.	Captain Ov Garrat	11 September 1949	1 October 1956	7 years, 20 days
3.	Ft. Lt. WB Oliver	1 October 1956	2 October 1957	1 year, 1 day
4.	Tan Sri Murad Ahmad	3 October 1957	24 July 1977	19 years, 294 days
5.	Dato' Ibrahim Hj. Mohamed	25 July 1977	30 April 1988	10 years, 280 days
6.	Dato' Nik Ariffin Nik Omar	1 May 1988	7 November 1989	1 year, 190 days
7.	Dato' Mohd. Yassin Jaafar	1 March 1990	7 February 1995	4 years, 343 days
8.	Dato' Mohd Zaman Khan	9 February 1995	31 December 1997	2 years, 325 days
9.	Dato' Omar Mohamed Dan	1 January 1998	16 October 2001	3 years, 288 days
10.	Datuk Mustafa Osman	17 October 2001	1 June 2009	7 years, 227 days
11.	Dato' Sri Zulkifli Omar	1 June 2009	1 January 2021	11 years, 214 days
12.	Dato' Nordin Muhamad	11 March 2021	Incumbent	5 years, 254 days

=== Deputy commissioners general ===
Deputy Commissioner General	Year
Dato Ibrahim Mohamed	
Dato Nik Arifin Nik Omar	
Mohd Nadzry Kushairi	1990–1993
Datuk Omar Mohamad Dan	1994–1997
Datuk Mustafa Osman	1998–2001
Donald Wee May Keun	2004–2005
Samsuddin Tan Sri Murad	2006
Dato' Seri Zulkifli Omar	2006–2008
Dato' Wan Mohamad Nazarie Wan Mahmood	2007–2012
Datuk Hassan Sakimon	2009–2017
Dato' Wan Abdul Rahman Wan Abdullah	2012–2017
Dato' Alzafry Mohamad Alnassif Mohamad Adahan	2017 – 2020
Dato' Jamaluddin Saad	2017 – 2020
Dato' Haji Abdul Aziz Bin Abdul Razak	2017 – current
Abd Kadir Hj Rais	2020-2023

== Institutions ==
=== Headquarters ===
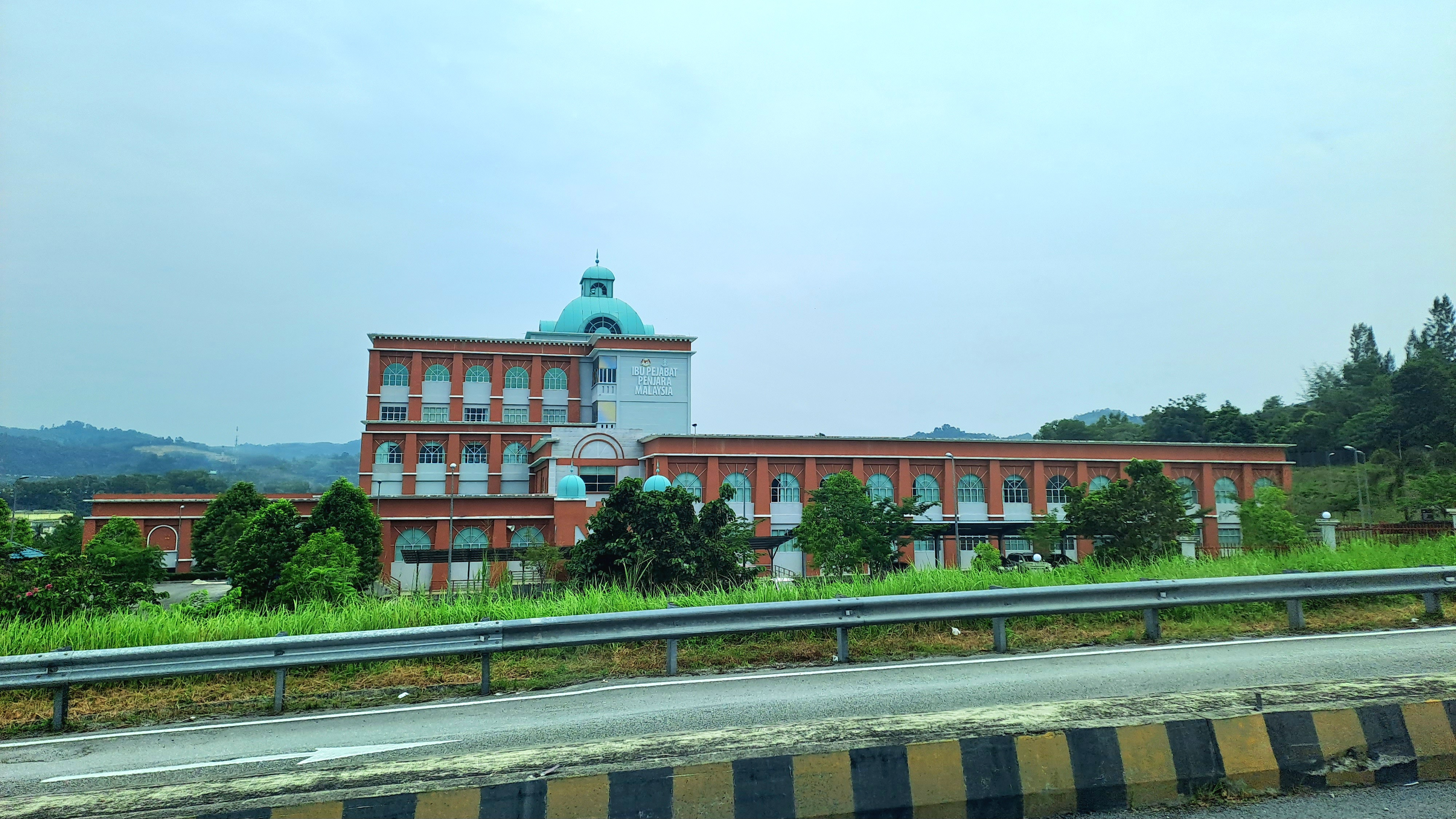
Malaysian Prison Headquarters building

- Malaysian Prison Headquarters, Kajang
- Sarawak Prison Headquarters, Kuching
- Sabah Prison Headquarters, Kota Kinabalu

=== Prison ===
==== Kedah ====
- Pokok Sena Prison
- Sungai Petani Prison
- Alor Star Prison

==== Penang ====
- Penang Prison
- Seberang Prai Prison

==== Perak ====
- Taiping Prison
- Tapah Prison

==== Selangor ====
- Sungai Buloh Prison
- Kajang Prison
- Kajang Women's Prison

==== Negeri Sembilan ====
- Jelebu Prison
- Seremban Prison

==== Melaka ====
- Ayer Keroh Prison
- Sg. Udang Prison

==== Johor ====
- Simpang Renggam Prison
- Kluang Prison

==== Pahang ====
- Bentong Prison
- Penor Prison

==== Terengganu ====
- Marang Prison

==== Kelantan ====
- Pengkalan Chepa Prison

==== Sarawak ====
- Puncak Borneo Prison
- Sibu Prison
- Miri Prison
- Bintulu Prison
- Sri Aman Prison
- Limbang Prison

==== Sabah ====
- Kota Kinabalu Prison
- Kota Kinabalu Women's Prison
- Tawau Prison
- Sandakan Prison

=== Correctional Centre ===
- Batu Gajah Correctional Centre
- Perlis Correctional Centre
- Puncak Alam Correctional Centre
- Labuan Correctional Centre

=== Juvenile School ===
- Henry Gurney School, Telok Mas, Malacca (boys & girls)
- Henry Gurney School, Kota Kinabalu, Sabah (all-girls)
- Henry Gurney School, Keningau, Sabah (all-boys)
- Henry Gurney School, Puncak Borneo, Kuching, Sarawak (all-boys)

=== Defunct Prison and Headquarters ===
- Malaysian Prison Headquarters, Taiping, Perak
- Pudu Prison, Kuala Lumpur (1895–1996)
- Johor Bahru Prison, Johor (1882–2005)
- Kuala Lipis Prison, Kuala Lipis, Pahang
- Kuantan Prison, Kuantan, Pahang
- Pulau Jerejak Prison, Penang
- Sim Sim Prison, Sandakan, Sabah (1850–1981)
- Banda Hilir Prison (1900-2009), now repurposed as Malaysia Prison Museum.

== Equipment ==
Malaysian Prison Department operators are equipped with multi-specialized weaponry and marine assault vehicles, including:

Model	Type	Origin	Usage
Taser X26	Less lethal weapon	United States	Standard issue
Smith & Wesson Model 15	Revolver	United States	Standard issue
Smith & Wesson M&P	Semi-automatic pistol	United States	Standard issue
Glock 17	Semi-automatic pistol	Austria	Used by senior officers and the TTC
Remington 870	Shotgun	United States	Standard issue
Benelli Nova	Shotgun	Italy	Used by the TTC
Heckler & Koch MP5	Submachine gun	Germany	Standard issue
CZ Scorpion Evo 3	Submachine gun	Czech Republic	Used by the TTC
Colt M16	Assault rifle	United States	Standard issue A2 and the TTC uses M16A4 with SOPMOD
FN MAG	Machine gun	Belgium	Standard issue
Accuracy International PM	Sniper rifle	United Kingdom	Used by the TTC
CS Mk.IV	Grenade launcher	Malaysia	Standard issue

== Famous inmates ==
- Botak Chin
- Kevin Barlow and Brian Chambers
- Mona Fandey
- Najib Razak, former Prime Minister

== Malaysian Prison Department in popular culture ==
=== Television ===
- Patahnya Sebelah Sayap (Half Wing Broken) – Malay drama created by Ayie Mustafa
- Disebalik Tirai Besi (Behind The Bar) – Malay drama produced by MDAG Marketing Sdn Bhd
