= Trup Tindakan Cepat =

Trup Tindakan Cepat Rapid Actions Troop تروڤ تيندقن چڤت
- Abbreviation: TTC

Agency overview
- Formed: 3 October 2005
- Employees: about 40 Operators

Jurisdictional structure
- Operations jurisdiction: Malaysia
- Primary governing body: Government of Malaysia
- Secondary governing body: Malaysian Prison Department
- Specialist jurisdiction: Counter terrorism, special weapons operations; protection of internationally protected persons, other very important persons, or state property

Operational structure
- Overseen by: Ministry of Home Affairs
- Headquarters: Malaysian Prisons Headquarters, near Kuala Lumpur
- Minister of Home Affair responsible: Saifuddin Nasution Ismail

Notables
- People: Dato’ Mustafa Osman (Director-General); Dato' Wan Mohamad Nazarie(Director of Security)
- Significant engagement: Post-2013 Lahad Datu standoff

The Trup Tindakan Cepat (English: Rapid Action Troops), or TTC, is an elite counter terrorism unit within the Malaysian Prison Department.

== History ==
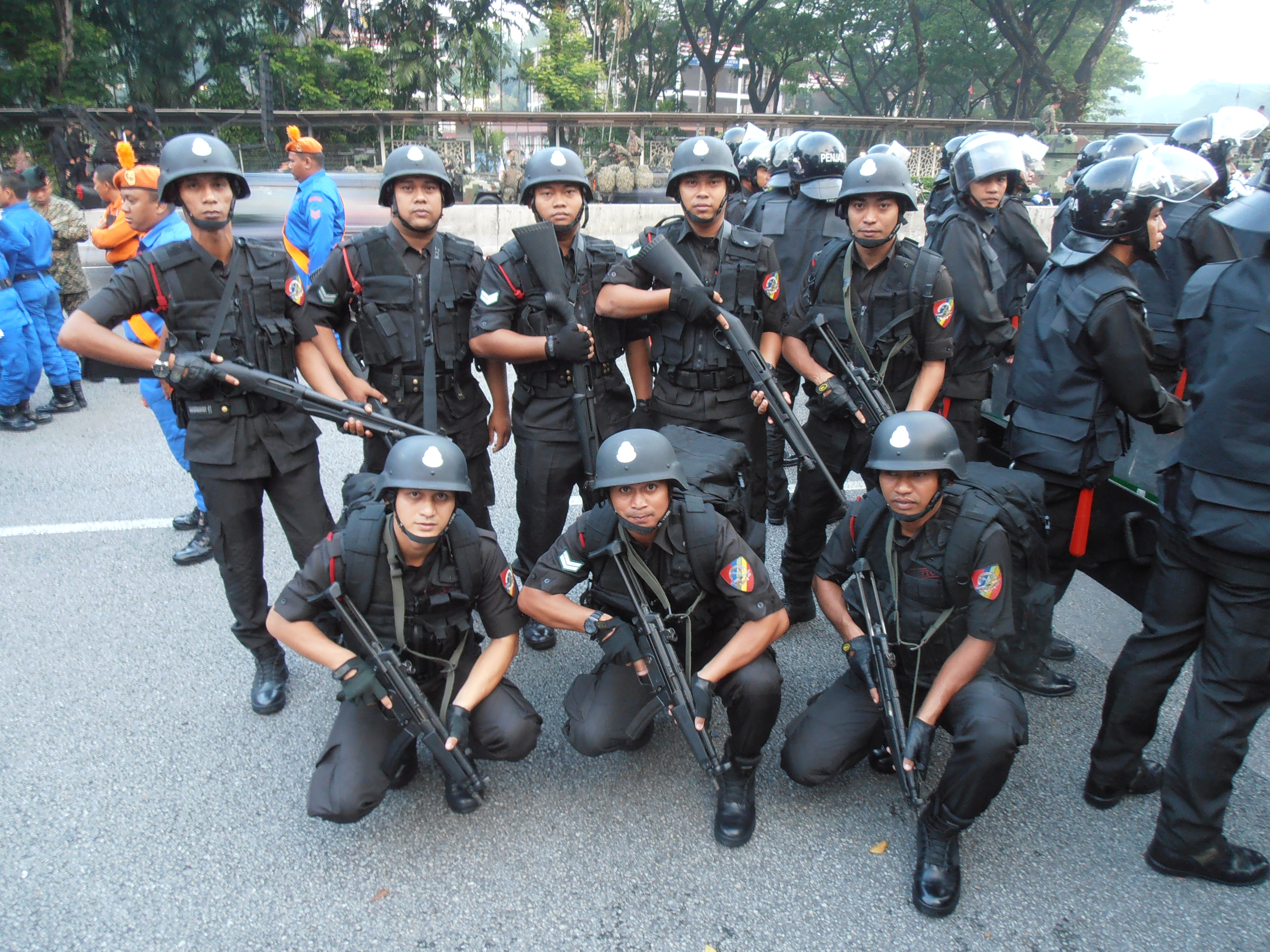
The team of TTC during the 57th National Day Parade of Malaysia.

The TTC was formed after the hostage incidents at Pudu Jail. The latter establishment was taken over by a Singaporean named Jimmy Chua and his henchmen, who captured the jail and took the staff and prisoners as a hostages.

The unit, which consists of 20 operators, under the command by Commissioner-General of Prisons, Dato' Mustafa Bin Osman, was established on 3 October 2005; it became operational in 2006. The team led by the Assistant Superintendent of Prisons, Yusli Bin Yusof, had undergone three months training at the Special Warfare Training Centre (PULPAK) in Sungai Udang Fort, Malacca. This training was conducted by the 11th Grup Gerak Khas Counter-Terrorist Regiment.

== Organisation ==
The Prisons Department are required to deploy such a unit because many high-profile criminals and terrorists are detained, including those under the Internal Security Act (ISA).

This unit liaises with other agencies, including the Pasukan Gerakan Khas and Royal Malaysian Navy's PASKAL which are also involved in national security.

The TTC duties include transport of high risk inmates, extracting uncooperative prisoners from their cells, daily full cell searches and high-profile security, barricaded persons, riots, mass arrest, high risk/high-profile transport and hostages situations, as well as crowd control.

The Prisons Department were originally accompanied by the police for escorting high-profile prisoners. Following the formation of the TTC, such moves could be carried out without police assistance.

TTC members are required to be contactable and able to respond at all times. TTC is founded upon a team concept and is made up of highly motivated and experienced officers.

== Training ==
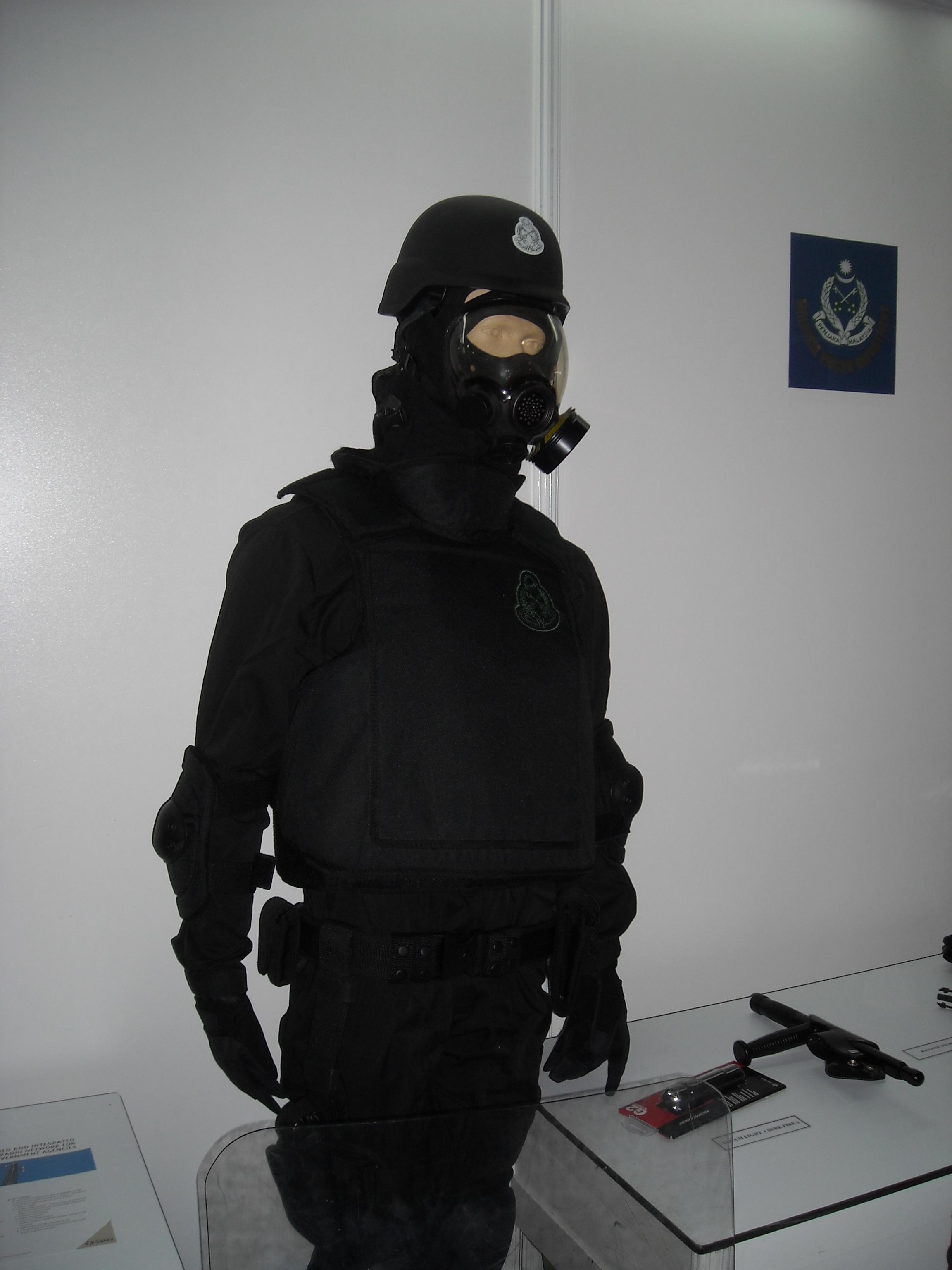
The CT (Counter Terrorist) team's Battle Dress Uniform (BDU)

The Prisons Department plan to expand the TTC to 30 officers after a preliminary trial at their training centre. The selection process for suitable officers, is extremely tough.

Potential officers of the TTC must be under 35 years old, has a good health and pass a qualification period. Throughout the process, officers must go through various physically demanding activities such as Individual physical proficiency tests or IPPT.

They must also clear the standard obstacle course within a stipulated time. Teamwork must be evident among officers as well.

They will be required to join a counter-terrorist course by the 69 Commando at the General Operations Force Training Centre, at Ulu Kinta.

Prospective trainees are expected to exceed the minimum requirements of the Physical Screening Test (PST) which are:

1. A 3.2 km run in 18 minutes
2. Seven chin-ups
3. 25 sit-ups in one minute
4. 25 push-ups in one minute
5. The fireman's lift over 100 metres
6. Swim 100 metres freestyle
7. Diving into 15 metres of water
8. Falling 10 metres
9. Treading water for five minutes
10. Climbing a six-metre rope
11. A firing skills test
12. A writing test

TTC officers are specialised in multiple areas, which are essential to make prisons safe in an ever-changing security climate, such as:

=== Combat Techniques ===
- Close-quarters riot control
- Transportation of high risk inmates
- Close protection
- Less lethal weaponry
- Dynamic entry
- Physical training
- Use of specialised weapons
- Tactical rappelling
- Close Quarters Combat
- Unarmed combat (including Taekwondo martial arts)
- Marksmanship
- Tactical shooting

=== Task Oriented ===
- Combat Search and Rescue (CSAR)
- Explosive Ordnance Disposal (EOD) handling
- Hostage rescue, internal and external, and in vehicles

=== Intelligence Gathering ===
- Intelligence
- Special reconnaissance
- Disguises

Their core functions include responding to prison contingencies and exercises, performing high risk escort duties and training prison officers in various core tactical skills.

In March 2010, the second series of TTC selection was attended by 32 trainees, only 18 personnel passed a 15-week course at the Prison Officer Training Centre, Taiping, Perak. The Best Intern was PW 14319 Mazlan Bin Abd. Razak from Bentong Prison. The Best at Shooting was PW 14450 Hj Majidee Bin Hj. Khalid from Miri Prisons and the Best at Physical Training was PW 14430 Mahadi Bin Mamat from Kajang Prison.

== Firearms ==
Like other specialist teams, the TTC is equipped with special weapons and equipment such as pistols, shotguns and SMG. TTC members have access to battering rams and tools for forced entry along with other weaponry including rifles, machine guns, grenade launchers and sniper rifles depend on the situation encountered. Weapons chosen possibility is:

Model	Origin	Type
Glock 17	Austria	Semi-automatic pistol
Smith & Wesson M&P	United States	Semi-automatic pistol
Remington 870	United States	Shotgun
Benelli Nova	Italy	Shotgun
Heckler & Koch MP5	Germany	Submachine gun
CZ Scorpion Evo 3	Czech Republic	Submachine gun
Colt M16	United States	Assault rifle
Accuracy International PM	United Kingdom	Sniper rifle
FN MAG	Belgium	Machine gun
CS Mk.IV	Malaysia	Grenade launcher
Taser X26	United States	Support equipment
Night vision devices	United States	Support equipment
T-baton	United States	Support equipment
Tactical vest	United States	Support equipment
Ballistic helmet	United States	Support equipment
Tactical shield	United States	Support equipment
Thunderbolt Mono Shock Ram	United States	Support equipment

== See also ==
- Singapore Prisons Emergency Action Response
- Correctional Emergency Response Team
