= Malaysia Prison Museum =

Museum in Melaka Tengah, Malacca, Malaysia

- Muzium Penjara Malaysia
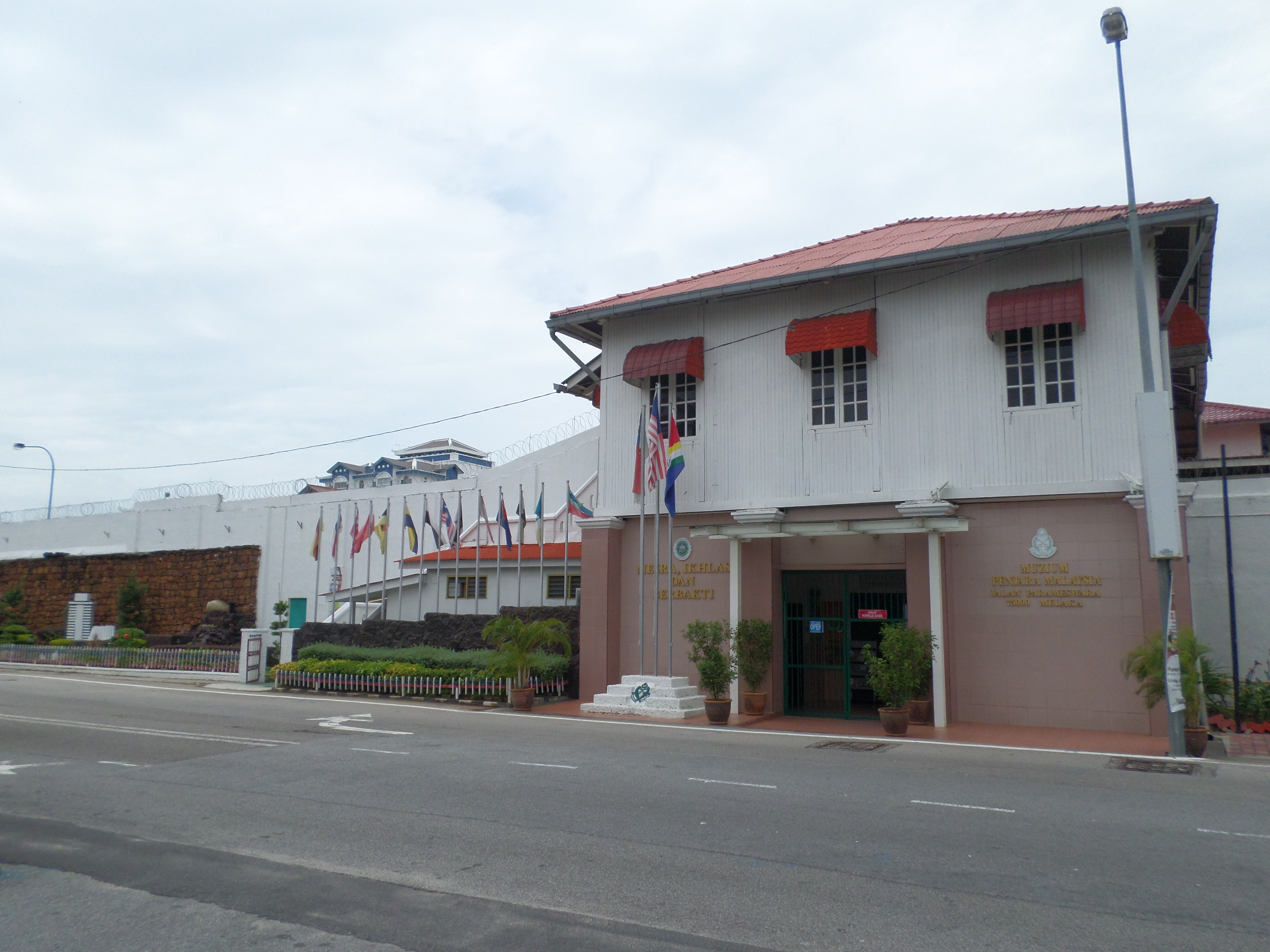
- Established: 20 November 2014; 11 years ago
- Location: Malacca City, Malacca, Malaysia
- Coordinates: 2°11′17.9″N 102°15′46.0″E
- Type: museum

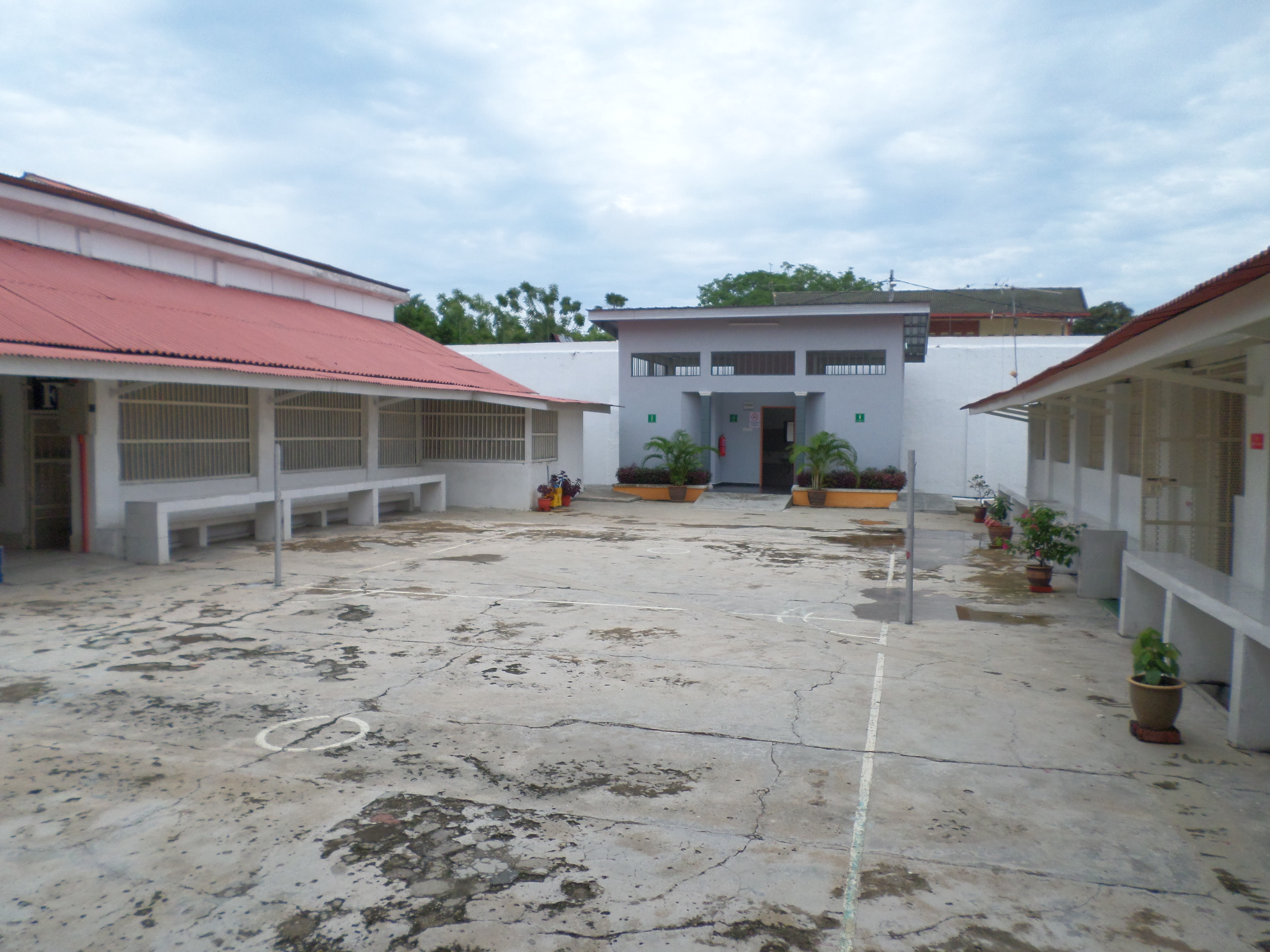
Malaysia Prison Museum interior

Malaysia Prison Museum (Malay: Muzium Penjara Malaysia) is a prison museum that displays items and information about prison life in Malacca City, Malacca, Malaysia. It was officially opened by Yang di-Pertua Negeri of Malacca Mohd Khalil Yaakob on 20 November 2014. The museum's building was originally constructed in 1860 by Governor Colonel Cavenagh as HM Prison Jail, and was also known as Henry Gurney School 2nd Bandar Hilir since 1964 and Bandar Hilir Prison since 11 June 1990.

== See also ==
- List of museums in Malaysia
- List of tourist attractions in Malacca
- List of jail and prison museums
