= Domestic discipline =

Domestic discipline most commonly refers to as the practice of fully consensual corporal discipline between two competent adult partners in a relationship, but also may refer to:

General topics

- Corporal punishment in the home, punishment of a child, normally the spanking or slapping of a child with the parent's open hand, but occasionally with an implement such as a belt, slipper, cane or paddle.
- Domestic violence, a pattern of abusive behaviors by one or both partners in an intimate relationship

Spousal discipline, where some approve of husband's discipline of their wives.

- Christianity and domestic violence, see the Bible section. Not to be confused with the Christian domestic discipline (CDD), a set of views and practices espoused by some Christians who believe in consensual domestic discipline or "Domestic Discipline" which is also practised with the full consent of both partners in a marriage or relationship.
- Islam and domestic violence, see the Qur'an An-Nisa.

Other topics

- BDSM, consensual use of bondage, discipline, sadism and masochism in interpersonal relationships
- Dominance and submission, consensual approval given for a set of behaviors
- Erotic spanking, the act of spanking another person for the sexual arousal or gratification of either or both parties.
