= An-Nisa =

4th chapter of the Quran

Surah 4 of the Quran
ٱلنِّسَاء An-Nisāʾ The Women
- Qira'ah; English text
- Classification: Medinan
- Position: Juzʼ 4–6
- Hizb no.: 8, 9, 10 and 11
- No. of verses: 176
- No. of Rukus: 24
- No. of words: 3745
- No. of letters: 16085

An-Nisa' (Arabic: ٱلنِّسَاء, An-Nisāʾ; meaning: The Women) is the fourth chapter (sūrah) of the Quran, with 176 verses (āyāt). The title derives from the references to women throughout the chapter, including verse 34 and verses 4:127-130.

In the timing and contextual background of the surah in tradition, it is thought to have been revealed around the fourth year of the Hijrah, although some verses may have come from other times. This would make it a Medinan surah, which came after the migration to Medina.

== Summary ==

Surah an-Nisā, is a chapter of the Quran regarding women.

- 1 Man and his Creator
- 2 Orphans, the duty of guardians to such
- 3–6 Treat your wives and those your right hands possess fairly
- 7–13 The law of inheritance
- 14–15 The punishment of adulteresses
- 16–18 Repentance enjoined
- 19 Women's rights
- 20–27 Forbidden and lawful degrees in marriage
- 28–30 Gambling, rapine, and suicide forbidden
- 31–33 Men and women will be rewarded according to their deeds
- 34 Reconcilement of man and wife
- 35–36 Parents, orphans, the poor etc. to be kindly treated
- 37–41 Hypocrisy in almsgiving condemned
- 42-43 Prayer forbidden to the drunken and polluted
- 44–45 Jewish mockers denounced
- 46–53 Idolatry the unpardonable sin
- 54–55 The rewards of faith and unbelief
- 56 Trusts to be faithfully paid back
- 57–68 Disputes to be settled by God and his Apostle
- 69–74 Precautions etc., in warring for the faith
- 75–84 The disobedient and cowardly reproved
- 85 Salutations to be returned
- 86–90 Treatment of hypocrites and apostates
- 91–93 Believers not to be slain or plundered
- 94–99 Believers in heathen countries to fly to Muslim lands
- 100–102 Special order for prayer in time of war
- 103 Exhortation to zeal for Islam
- 104–114 Fraud denounced
- 115–125 Idolatry and Islam compared
- 126 Equity in dealing with women and orphans enjoined
- 127–129 Men are protectors of women
- 130–132 God to be feared
- 133 Fraud denounced
- 134–138 Muslims exhorted to steadfastness
- 139–143 Hypocrites to be shunned
- 144–151 The reward of hypocrisy and belief compared
- 152–154 Presumptuous and disobedient Jews destroyed
- 155 The breaking of God's covenant, denying God's signs, and killing the prophets by the Children of Israel.
- 156–158 The Jews defame Mary and Jesus
- 159–160 Certain kinds of food forbidden to Jews as punishment
- 161–168 Muhammad’s inspiration like that of other prophets
- 169–174 Christians reproved for their faith in Jesus as the Son of God and in the doctrine of the Trinity
- 175–176 The law of inheritance for distant relatives

This Medinan surah aims at protecting the newly formed Muslim community by outlining acceptable behavior for Muslims. It illustrates the Quran's role as an authoritative legal source and its ability to shape the community. The surah aims to eradicate the earlier practices of pagan, Arab communities that are no longer considered moral in the Muslim society. For example, the section of this surah about dealing fairly with orphan girls (4:2-4) addresses the pre-Islamic Arabic practice of marrying orphan girls to take their property.

Shirk (refer 4:48 and 4:116) is held to be the worst form of disbelief, and it is identified in the Quran as the only sin that God will not pardon.

Thematically, "an-Nisā" not only addresses concerns about women, but also discusses inheritance, marriage laws, how to deal with children and orphans, legal practices, jihād, relations between Muslim communities and People of the Book, war, and the role of Jesus as a prophet, rather than the son of God as Christians claimed. Furthermore, in discussing war, this surah encourages the Muslim community to fight for the vulnerable in war, as demonstrated by 4:75: "Why should you not fight in God's cause and for those oppressed men, women, and children who cry out, ‘Lord, rescue us from this town whose people are oppressors! By Your grace, give us a protector and give us a helper!’?" The surah addresses a multitude of issues faced by the early Muslim community and responds to the challenges the community faced. The wide variety of issues addressed in the surah and the length of the surah make it difficult to divide into literary structures. However, based on a study of themes present in each section of the Surah, Amīn Ahsan Islāhī divides the surah into three thematically-based sections: social reform, the Islamic community and its opponents, and a conclusion. Mathias Zahniser presents an alternative means of looking at the structure of this surah. He claims that the central theme of this surah is the address to the Christians. He has come to this conclusion based on examination of the structure of the surah based on such devices as parallels, repetition, and ring composition. However, Carl Ernst admits that more works needs to be done in this type of structural analysis to more fully understand the composition of such extensive suras.

In Qur'an and Woman, Amina Wadud places interpretations of the Quran into three categories: traditional, reactive, and holistic. The type of interpretation one applies to surah 4 greatly influences one's perspective on the role of women within Muslim society. Taking the third approach, a holistic approach allows for a feminist reading of the Quran, which is particularly relevant to an-Nisā and can reshape the understanding of this surah.

== Classification ==
Regarding the timing and contextual background of the believed revelation (Asbāb al-nuzūl), it is a Medinan surah as confirmed by Muhammad Husayn Tabataba'i, who states that the sura must have been revealed after the hijrah based on the subject matter.

Although an-Nisā typically appears as the fourth surah, according to the Nöldeke classification of surahs, based on Islamic traditions, "The Women" was approximately revealed as the hundredth surah. Amir-Ali places it as the 94th surah, while Hz. Osman and Ibn`Abbas believe it is the 92nd. Imam Ja'far as-Sadiq places it as the 91st surah revealed. Based on the legislation concerning orphans, the surah was most likely revealed after many Muslims were killed at the Battle of Uhud, leaving numerous dependants in the new Muslim community. The revelation, therefore, began around the year three, according to the Islamic calendar, but was not completed until the year eight. Consequently, parts of this surah, the second-longest in the Quran, were revealed concurrently with portions of "The Examined Woman," sura 60. However, the surah shows some thematic coherence, despite its disjointed and ongoing revelation.

Furthermore, as relates to the placement of this surah within the Quran as a whole, Neal Robinson notes what he refers to as the "dovetailing" of surahs. Based on this idea of structure, one surah ends with a topic that is immediately picked up in the next surah. The Family of 'Imran, surah 3, includes a discussion of male and female near the end of the surah (3:195). This theme continues at the beginning of surah 4: "People, be mindful of your Lord, who created you from a single soul, and from it created its mate, and from the pair of them spread countless men and women far and wide; be mindful of God, in whose name you make requests of one another." This dovetailing may indicate a complex editorial process involved in ordering the surahs.

== Exegesis ==
=== 3 Institutions of Marriage and Slavery ===
4:3 If you fear you might fail to give orphan women their ˹due˺ rights ˹if you were to marry them˺, then marry other women of your choice—two, three, or four. But if you are afraid you will fail to maintain justice, then ˹content yourselves with˺ one or those ˹bondwomen˺ in your possession. This way you are less likely to commit injustice.

A detailed explanation of this verse is given in the 'interpretation' (Tafsir) of Ibn Kathir, a scholar of the Mamluk era:

The Ayah commands, if you fear that you will not be able to do justice between your wives by marrying more than one, then marry only one wife, or satisfy yourself with only female captives.

Al-Jalalayn, says:

4:3 Each man may marry two or three or four but do not exceed this; but if you fear you will not be equitable towards them in terms of their expenses and individual share; then marry only one or restrict yourself to what your right hands own of slavegirls since these do not have the same rights as wives; thus by that marrying of only four or only one or resorting to slavegirls it is likelier it is nearer in outcome that you will not be unjust that you will not be inequitable.

=== 15–16 Unlawful sexual intercourse ===
In verses 4:15-16, the first, preliminary directives for the punishment for unlawful sexual intercourse are stated. The first verse deals with women. The punishment laid down was to confine them until further directives were revealed. The second verse (i.e. 16) relates to both sexes. The injunction lays down that they should be punished – that is, they should be kept refined to houses.

=== 22–23 Incest ===
Verses 4:22-23 cover which classes of women within one's family with whom marriage or sexual intercourse would be considered haram.

These relationships and limitations are defined and elaborated on within Tafsir al-Jalalayn.

=== 34 Men are the protectors and maintainers of women ===
4:34 Men are the protectors and maintainers of women because Allah has made one of them excel over the other, and because they spend out of their possessions (to support them). Thus righteous women are obedient and guard the rights of men in their absence under Allah's protection. As for women of whom you fear rebellion, admonish them, and remain apart from them in beds, and beat them. Then if they obey you, do not seek ways to harm them. Allah is Exalted, Great.

— Quran 4:34

There are a number of interpretations of the original Arabic 4:34. The Encyclopedia of Islam and the Muslim World terms Verse 4:34 the Quran's least egalitarian verse.

Some Muslims, such as Islamic feminist groups, argue that Muslim men use the text as an excuse for domestic violence.

=== 48 Idolatry and polytheism ===
4:48 Indeed, Allah does not forgive associating others with Him ˹in worship˺, but forgives anything else of whoever He wills. And whoever associates others with Allah has indeed committed a grave sin.

— Quran 4:48

Tafsir, Ibn Kathir says, Allah said that He, "forgives not that partners should be set up with Him (in worship)", meaning, He does not forgive a servant if he meets Him while he is associating partners with Him". The Enlightening Commentary into the Light of the Holy Qur'an says, "Polytheism is the worst form of sins and it is a barrier against the Divine forgiveness."

=== 59 Obedience Verse ===
4:59 O believers! Obey Allah and obey the Messenger and those in authority among you. Should you disagree on anything, then refer it to Allah and His Messenger, if you ˹truly˺ believe in Allah and the Last Day. This is the best and fairest resolution.

=== 65 Verse ===
Muhammad al-Bukhari, Muslim ibn al-Hajjaj, Ibn Majah and Nasa'i narrated a hadith transmitted by Zubayr ibn al-Awwam, that believed by some scholars as the Asbab al-Nuzul (cause of revelation) of the Sura of An Nisa verse 65. However, there are contemporary Fatwa that the revelation of this verse were attributed to az-Zubayr were weak, as the stronger Hadith which attributed to the revelation of this verse were instead attributed to the tradition of Umar, the second Rashidun Caliph

=== 69 Martyrs, and the righteous ===
Muhammad ibn Sulayman recorded that al-Sadiq relayed to his elderly father, Abu Muhammad ibn Sulayman, concerning the following verse: "And whoever obeys Allah and the Messenger – those will be with the ones upon whom Allah has bestowed favor of the prophets, the steadfast affirmers of truth, the martyrs and the righteous. And excellent are those as companions." (4:69) stating, "The Messenger of Allah in this verse is from of the prophets, and we (Ahl al-Bayt) in this subject are the truthful and the martyrs and you all, (our followers), are the righteous, so adopt this name."

=== 74–76 Fight for the cause of Allah ===
Let those who would sacrifice this life for the Hereafter fight in the cause of Allah. And whoever fights in Allah’s cause—whether they achieve martyrdom or victory—We will honour them with a great reward.
And what is it with you? You do not fight in the cause of Allah and for oppressed men, women, and children who cry out, "Our Lord! Deliver us from this land of oppressors! Appoint for us a saviour; appoint for us a helper—all by Your grace."
Believers fight for the cause of Allah, whereas disbelievers fight for the cause of the Devil. So fight against Satan’s ˹evil˺ forces. Indeed, Satan’s schemes are ever weak.

— Quran 4:74-76

According to Ibn Kathir: "Therefore, the believers fight in obedience to Allah and to gain His pleasure, while the disbelievers fight in obedience to Shaytan. Allah then encourages the believers to fight His enemies". Islam allows war in self-defense (Quran 22:39), to defend Islam (rather than to spread it), to protect those who have been removed from their homes by force because they are Muslims (Q22:40), and to protect the innocent who are being oppressed (Q4:75).

=== 89–90 Do not take hypocrites as allies or helpers ===
4:89 They wish you would disbelieve as they have disbelieved, so you may all be alike. So do not take them as allies unless they emigrate in the cause of Allah. But if they turn away, then seize them and kill them wherever you find them, and do not take any of them as allies or helpers,
4:90 except those who are allies of a people you are bound with in a treaty or those wholeheartedly opposed to fighting either you or their own people. If Allah had willed, He would have empowered them to fight you. So if they refrain from fighting you and offer you peace, then Allah does not permit you to harm them.

— Quran 4:89-90

The verse discusses a group of people who nominally became Muslims and secretly supported the enemies of Muslims. For those hypocrites to prove their loyalty, they were commanded to emigrate and join the ranks of the believers, or they would be considered enemies. Muhammad advises his companions to avoid taking these individuals as helpers or guardians.

=== 116 Shirk ===
4:116 Surely Allah does not forgive associating ˹others˺ with Him ˹in worship˺, but forgives anything else of whoever He wills. Indeed, whoever associates ˹others˺ with Allah has clearly gone far astray.

Tafsir Ibn Kathir says: "Shirk shall not be forgiven, in reality the idolators worship shaytan".

=== 127–130 Female orphans, desertion by husband, and desirability of marital peace ===
These verses cover issues associated with female orphans; desertion by the husband and the desirability of marital peace.

=== 145 Hypocrites ===
In Kitab al-Kafi, Ja'far al-Sadiq writes a letter to his companions stressing the importance of obeying Allah, his Messenger, and the "Wali al Amr" (Progeny of Muhammad)- going so far as to say that those who disobey and deny their virtues are "liars and hypocrites". He asserts that these are the individuals described as "hypocrites" in the verse, "Indeed, the hypocrites will be in the lowest depths of the Fire – and never will you find for them a helper."

=== 155 The sins of the Children of Israel ===
Ibn Kathir, in his commentary on verse 155 of Surah An-Nisa, says that the Children of Israel were cursed and strayed from guidance and the right path because of their breaking of the covenant, denying the signs of God, denying the miracles of their prophets, and killing the prophets unjustly.

=== 157 Islamic view on Jesus' death ===
and for boasting, "We killed the Messiah, Jesus, son of Mary, the messenger of Allah." But they neither killed nor crucified him—it was only made to appear so. Even those who argue for this ˹crucifixion˺ are in doubt. They have no knowledge whatsoever—only making assumptions. They certainly did not kill him.

— Quran 4:157

An explanation of the Islamic view of Jesus as a prophet, rather than as the son of God as Christians claim, is given in Tafsir Ibn Kathir.

=== 161 Usury and the Unjust Consumption of People's Wealth ===
Ibn Kathir, in his commentary on verse 161 of Surah An-Nisa, says that despite God's prohibition of usury, the Jews continued to take usury and unjustly appropriate people's Wealth. He explains that the Jews continued to practice usury using various tricks and deceptions, and God forbade them from certain lawful foods due to their oppression and rebellion.

=== 171 Islamic view of the Trinity ===
4:171 O People of the Book! Do not go to extremes regarding your faith; say nothing about Allah except the truth. The Messiah, Jesus, son of Mary, was no more than a messenger of Allah and the fulfilment of His Word through Mary and a spirit ˹created by a command˺ from Him. So believe in Allah and His messengers and do not say, "Trinity." Stop!—for your own good. Allah is only One God. Glory be to Him! He is far above having a son! To Him belongs whatever is in the heavens and whatever is on the earth. And Allah is sufficient as a Trustee of Affairs.

— Quran 4:171

== See also ==
- At-Talaq – divorce
- Islam and gender segregation
- Islamic feminism
- Islamic marital jurisprudence
- LGBT in Islam
- Lut
- Verse of obedience
- Women in Islam
