= An-Nisa, 34 =

Verse in the Qur'an

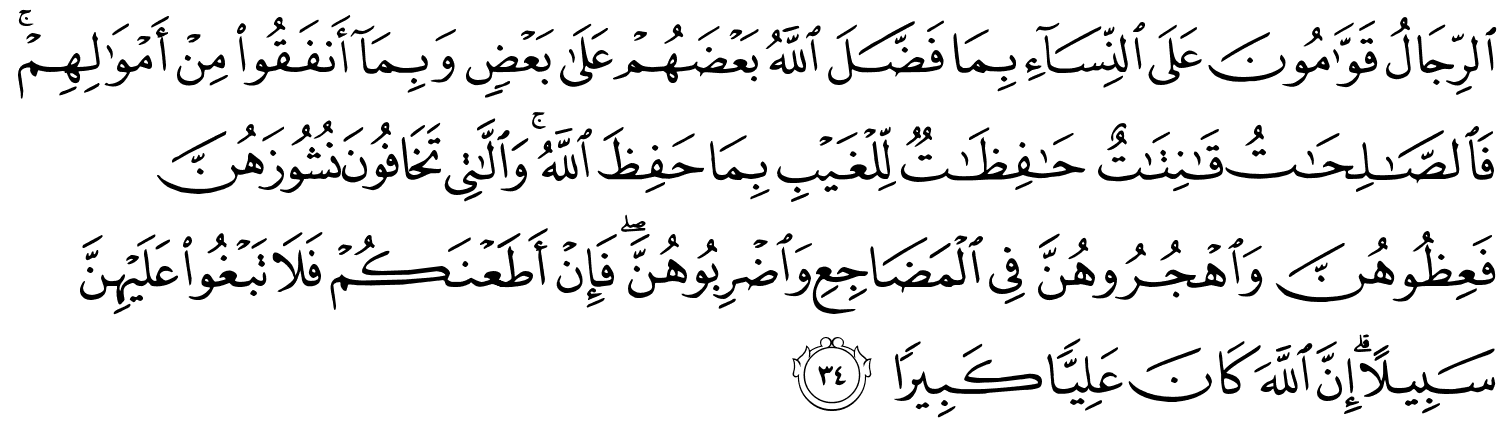
4:34 in the Usmani Script

An-Nisa, 34
Recitation of An-Nisa, verse 34, taken from a full recitation of An-Nisa.

An-Nisa 4:34 is the 34th verse in the fourth chapter of the Quran. This verse adjudges the role of a husband as protector and maintainer of his wife and how he should deal with ill-conduct on her part. Scholars vastly differ on the implications of this verse, with some interpreting it as an endorsement of physical discipline administered by the husband on his wife and others disputing that or arguing that it serves as a deterrent from anger-based domestic violence.

== Text and translations ==
=== Verse ===
ٱلرِّجَالُ قَوَّٰمُونَ عَلَى ٱلنِّسَآءِ بِمَا فَضَّلَ ٱللَّهُ بَعْضَهُمْ عَلَىٰ بَعْضٍۢ وَبِمَآ أَنفَقُوا۟ مِنْ أَمْوَٰلِهِمْ ۚ فَٱلصَّـٰلِحَـٰتُ قَـٰنِتَـٰتٌ حَـٰفِظَـٰتٌۭ لِّلْغَيْبِ بِمَا حَفِظَ ٱللَّهُ ۚ وَٱلَّـٰتِى تَخَافُونَ نُشُوزَهُنَّ فَعِظُوهُنَّ وَٱهْجُرُوهُنَّ فِى ٱلْمَضَاجِعِ وَٱضْرِبُوهُنَّ ۖ فَإِنْ أَطَعْنَكُمْ فَلَا تَبْغُوا۟ عَلَيْهِنَّ سَبِيلًا ۗ إِنَّ ٱللَّهَ كَانَ عَلِيًّۭا كَبِيرًۭا

=== Transliteration ===
ar-rijālu qawwamūna ʿala -n-nisāʾi bimā faḍḍala - llāhu baʿḏahum ʿala baʿḍin wa bimā ʾanfaqū min ʾamwālihim fa-ṣ-ṣāliḥātu qānitātun ḥāfiẓātun l-il-ghaybi bimā ḥafiẓa -llāhu wa-l-lātī takhāfūna nushūzahunna fa-ʿiẓūhunna w-ahjurūhunna fi-l-maḍājiʿ w-aḍribūhunna fa ʾin ʾaṭaʿnakum falā tabghū ʿalayhinna sabīlan ʾinna -llāha kāna ʿalīyyan kabīra

=== English translations ===
Abdullah Yusuf Ali, The Holy Qur'an (1934):

Men are the protectors and maintainers of women, because God has given the one more (strength) than the other, and because they support them from their means. Therefore the righteous women are devoutly obedient, and guard in (the husband's) absence what God would have them guard. As to those women on whose part ye fear disloyalty and ill-conduct, admonish them (first), (Next), refuse to share their beds, (And last) beat them (lightly); but if they return to obedience, seek not against them Means (of annoyance): For Allah is Most High, great (above you all).

Muhammad Abdel-Haleem, The Qur'an (2004):

Husbands should take good care of their wives, with [the bounties] God has given to some more than others and with what they spend out of their own money. Righteous wives are devout and guard what God would have them guard in their husbands’ absence. If you fear high-handedness from your wives, remind them [of the teachings of God], then ignore them when you go to bed, then hit them. If they obey you, you have no right to act against them: God is most high and great.

Mustafa Khattab, The Clear Quran (2015):

Men are the caretakers of women, as men have been provisioned by God over women and tasked with supporting them financially. And righteous women are devoutly obedient and, when alone, protective of what God has entrusted them with. And if you sense ill-conduct from your women, advise them ˹first˺, ˹if they persist,˺ do not share their beds, ˹but if they still persist,˺ then discipline them ˹gently˺. But if they change their ways, do not be unjust to them. Surely God is Most High, All-Great.

== Verses in context ==
4:32 And do not wish for that by which Allāh has made some of you exceed others. For men is a share of what they have earned, and for women is a share of what they have earned. And ask Allāh of His bounty. Indeed Allāh is ever, of all things, Knowing.
4:33 And for all, We have made heirs to what is left by parents and relatives. And to those whom your oaths have bound [to you] - give them their share. Indeed Allāh is ever, over all things, a Witness.
4:34 Men are in charge of women by [right of] what Allāh has given one over the other and what they spend [for maintenance] from their wealth. So righteous women are devoutly obedient, guarding in [the husband's] absence what Allāh would have them guard. But those [wives] from whom you fear arrogance - [first] advise them; [then if they persist], forsake them in bed; and [finally], strike them [lightly]. But if they obey you [once more], seek no means against them. Indeed, Allāh is ever Exalted and Grand.
4:35 And if you fear dissension between the two, send an arbitrator from his people and an arbitrator from her people. If they both desire reconciliation, Allāh will cause it between them. Indeed, Allāh is ever Knowing and Aware.

— Surah An-Nisa 4:32-35 ^{-Sahih International}

== Background of the verse ==
There are a number of translations of this verse from the Arabic original, and all vary to some extent. Some Muslims, such as Islamic feminist groups, say that Muslim men use the text as an excuse for domestic violence.

In Muhammad's farewell sermon as recorded in al-Tabari's History, and in a Sahih Hadith collected by Abu Dawud, he gave permission to husbands to hit their wives under certain circumstances without severity (فَاضْرِبُوهُنَّ ضَرْبًا غَيْرَ مُبَرِّحٍ fadribuhunna darban ghayra mubarrih; literal translation: "... then beat them, a beating without severity") When the cousin and companion of Muhammad, Ibn Abbas, replied back: “I asked Ibn Abbas: ‘What is the hitting that is 'without severity'?’ He replied [with] the siwak (tooth-stick) and the like’.

Another hadith narration of the Farewell Sermon appears in Sunan Ibn Majah. The Arabic phrase mentioned above is here translated, "hit them, but without causing injury or leaving a mark."

It was narrated that: Sulaiman bin Amr bin Ahwas said: “My father told me that he was present at the Farewell Pilgrimage with the Messenger of Allah. He praised and glorified Allah, and reminded and exhorted (the people). Then he said: 'I enjoin good treatment of women, for they are prisoners with you, and you have no right to treat them otherwise, unless they commit clear indecency. If they do that, then forsake them in their beds and hit them, but without causing injury or leaving a mark. If they obey you, then do not seek means of annoyance against them. You have rights over your women and your women have rights over you. Your rights over your women are that they are not to allow anyone whom you dislike to tread on your bedding (furniture), nor allow anyone whom you dislike to enter your houses. And their right over you are that you should treat them kindly with regard to their clothing and food.' ” Grade: Sahih

`A’isha said: the Messenger of Allah (saws) never struck a servant or a woman.

There have been several fatwas against domestic violence. Feminist writers have said that society during Quranic times differed from modern times, especially in how children were reared and raised, creating a need for gender roles. These scholars say that the Qur'an can be interpreted differently as society changes.

Jonathan A.C. Brown said:

The vast majority of the ulama across the Sunni schools of law inherited the Prophet's unease over domestic violence and placed further restrictions on the evident meaning of the 'Wife Beating Verse'. A leading Meccan scholar from the second generation of Muslims, Ata' bin Abi Rabah, counseled a husband not to beat his wife even if she ignored him but rather to express his anger in some other way. Darimi, a teacher of both Tirmidhi and Muslim bin Hajjaj as well as a leading early scholar in Iran, collected all the Hadiths showing Muhammad's disapproval of beating in a chapter entitled 'The Prohibition on Striking Women'. A thirteenth-century scholar from Granada, Ibn Faras, notes that one camp of ulama had staked out a stance forbidding striking a wife altogether, declaring it contrary to the Prophet's example and denying the authenticity of any Hadiths that seemed to permit beating. Even Ibn Hajar, the pillar of late medieval Sunni Hadith scholarship, concludes that, contrary to what seems to be an explicit command in the Qur'an, the Hadiths of the Prophet leave no doubt that striking one's wife to discipline her actually falls under the Shariah ruling of 'strongly disliked' or 'disliked verging on prohibited'.

The first part of the verse about men having authority over women is meant for obedience towards God, not the husband.

=== Background on the roles of men and women in Islam ===
The Qur'an states that men are in charge of women because God has favored one over the other and they are responsible to provide them. Women, however, are given a degree of autonomy over their own income and property. Nevertheless, they are responsible for educating the children, as God has given the one preference over the other. Man is also considered to be the head of the family. The Qur'an recommends that wives be obedient and adaptable to their husbands. Wives should also keep the secrets of their husbands and protect their honor and integrity. Islamic scholars consider this important in running a smooth family system.

Divorced women must wait three monthly cycles ˹before they can re-marry˺. It is not lawful for them to conceal what Allah has created in their wombs, if they ˹truly˺ believe in Allah and the Last Day. And their husbands reserve the right to take them back within that period if they desire reconciliation. Women have rights similar to those of men equitably, although men have a degree ˹of responsibility˺ above them. And Allah is Almighty, All-Wise.

For both men and women, zulm- known in English as actions of 'cruelty' against someone- is explicitly prohibited.

==== Shared Treatment of genders throughout the Qur'an ====
The equality of men and women is discussed in many places throughout the text.

Then Satan tempted them in order to expose what was hidden of their nakedness.

The Qur'an is also very specific that both men and women should receive equal punishment for wrongdoings (24:2), and that God will give a believer who does a righteous deed, regardless of being male or female, Paradise (4:124).

As for female and male fornicators, give each of them one hundred lashes

But those who do good—whether male or female—and have faith will enter Paradise and will never be wronged ˹even as much as˺ the speck on a date stone.

==== Male and female relationships in the times of Muhammad ====
In her book Qur'an and Women, scholar Amina Wadud writes about the importance of women in the time of Muhammad. During this time, women did not have access to the technology that women today have; giving birth and raising children was much more difficult due to diseases and lack of healthcare knowledge. For this reason, Wadud writes, "The Qur'an establishes his [the husband's] responsibility as qiwamah: seeing to it that the women is not burdened with additional responsibilities which jeopardize that primary demanding responsibility only she can fulfill." The need to reproduce and raise children contributed to the importance of gender roles in the time of Muhammad.

Scholar Ayesha Chaudhry writes that many Muslims have this fundamentally flawed way of examining the text, writing that "Despite the potential for such verses [4:34] to have multiple plain-sense meanings, living Muslim communities place these interpretations in conversation with the pre-colonial Islamic tradition".

==== Examples from Muhammad ====
The late Ayatollah Sayyid Muhammad Hussein Tabataba'i (1903-1981 AD) provides the following exegesis on 4:34 from both Sunni and Shi'ite sources in his Mizan:

Ibn Abi Hatim has narrated through Ash’ath ibn ‘Abdil-Malik from al-Hasan that he said: “A woman came to the Prophet complaining against her husband that he had slapped her. The Messenger of Allah said: “Retribution”. Then Allah revealed the verse, “Men are maintainers of women… (4:34); so the woman returned without retribution [ad-Durr 'l-munthur, as-Suyuti]. [as-Suyuti] has narrated it from the Prophet through other chains too. Some of them say that the Messenger of Allah said: “I wanted one thing (retribution), but Allah decided otherwise"...there were some instances where Allah had amended some prophetic orders by adding to or deleting from it, but it was only in his administrative order, not in matters of the law ordained by him for his people, otherwise it would have been an invalid nullification...the Messenger of Allah used to wonder aloud: "How can you embrace the woman with a hand you had hit her with?". It is narrated also in al-Kafi through his chain from Abu Maryam from Abu Ja’far (Imam Muhammad al-Baqir) that he said: “The Messenger of Allah said: “What! Does one of you hit his wife, and then attempt to embrace her?". Countless such statements are found in the traditions; and one may understand from them the Islamic views on this subject.

Al-Tabari (839-923 AD) wrote that, "The Prophet never raised his hand against one of his wives, or against a slave, nor against any person at all." In fact, when Muhammad faced rebellion of his wives, rather than beat them, Al-Tabari accounts that he instead, "stayed away from his wives for 29 nights."

== Debates and discussion about the text ==
In response to nushûz, admonishment, leaving wives in their beds and idribihunna are permitted. Islamic scholars agree such actions can not be undertaken for any reason other than those mentioned in the Qur'an (see nushûz).

=== Authority of men ===
This allots men authority, qawwamun, over women conditional on men being responsible of earning income on behalf of for women and spending their property to support women i.e., clothing, residence, and sustenance.

==== Obedient or Qanitat ====
The verse commands women to be qanitat. The term has been used in Quran 33:35 to refer to men and women alike, who are obedient to God. Some commentators use the term to mean obedience to the husband, while others assert that it means obedience to God. Some scholars agree that the husband does not have absolute control over his wife, and her first loyalty is to God.

==== To admonish them ====
The first response to nushuz is wā'z (‘وَعَظ’), meaning to first admonish or scold the wife of her behaviour. There is strong agreement amongst Muslim scholars that this admonishment must be conducted in a spirit of reconciliation.

==== To leave them alone in beds ====
According to tafsir ibn kathir, a well known commentary of Quran. He describes in his exegesis.

The Sunan and Musnad compilers recorded that Mu`awiyah bin Haydah Al-Qushayri said, "O Allah's Messenger! What is the right that the wife of one of us has on him" The Prophet said, To feed her when you eat, cloth her when you buy clothes for yourself, refrain from striking her face or cursing her, and to not abandon her, except in the house.

Should the nushuz continue, the next step is to refuse to share the bed with the wife. Again Muslim scholars emphasize on the spirit of healing while conducting this action.

==== To beat them (iḍribūhunna) ====
There are a number of translations of the original Arabic 4:34.

The term iḍribūhunna (usually translated, 'beat them') in 4:34 is the imperative form of the phrase ḍaraba (Arabic: ضرب 'to beat, beat, smote, or strike'). Scholars interpret iḍribūhunna in different ways. Whereas the consensus interprets it to mean "to strike", some hold that the term means "to separate". Such an action is to be administered only if neither the husband nor the wife are willing to divorce.

The term daraba is translated by Yusuf Ali as "beat," but the Arabic word is used elsewhere in the Qur'an to convey different meanings. The phrase, "Daraba Allah mathalan" translates to, "Allah gives or sets an example." The use of this word might be compared to the way "to strike" is used in English, which can mean, "to strike a pose," or "to strike a bargain," not just referring to the physical act of hitting something. The use of daraba is also intentional, because a different Arabic word exists, "daraba" which is translated to, "to strike repeatedly or intensely."

Muslim scholars who permit hitting, emphasize that it must not be harsh, but rather light. Muslim men are never to hit their spouse's face, nor to hit them in such a way as would leave marks on their body. According to a hadith transmitted by Abu Huraira, slapping someone across the face is forbidden. Scholars suggest that the response administered should be in proportion to the fault committed. Traditionally the idea of beating was "with a toothbrush" or "with a folded handkerchief." Jonathan A.C. Brown resumes the situation:

If a wife exhibited egregious disobedience (nushuz) such as uncharacteristically insulting behavior, leaving the house against the husband's will and without a valid excuse or denying her husband sex (without medical grounds), the husband should first admonish her to be conscious of God and proper etiquette. If she did not desist from her behavior, he should cease sleeping with her in their bed. If she still continued in her nushuz, he should then strike her to teach her the error of her ways. Shaffii law only allowed the husband to use his hand or a wound-up handkerchief (mina malfuf), not a whip or stick. All schools of law prohibited striking the wife in the face or in any sensitive area likely to cause injury. All except some Maliki jurists held that the wife could claim compensation payment (diya) from the husband for any injury she sustained, and Hanbalis, the later Shaffii school as well as the Maliki school, allowed a judge to dissolve the marriage at no cost to the wife if harm had been done. In effect, any physical harm was grounds for compensation and divorce since the Prophet had limited striking one's wife to 'a light blow that leaves no mark.' Causing any injury thus meant that a husband had exceeded his rights. All schools of law agreed that if the wife died due to a beating, her family could claim her wergild or possibly even have the husband executed.

Many jurists interpret iḍribūhunna as "more or less symbolic." Others, however, argue that a mere symbolic administration would be pointless and rather should be an "energetic demonstration" of the love of the husband. But it is agreed that the demonstration should not seriously hurt the wife.

The 2007 translation The Sublime Quran by Laleh Bakhtiar translates iḍribūhunna not as 'beat them' but as 'go away from them'. The introduction to her translation discusses the linguistic and shari‘ah reasons in Arabic for understanding this verb in context. This interpretation is supported by the fact that some other verses, such as 4:101 which contains word darabtum (derivation from daraba), demonstrate also the interpretation of Arabic word daraba to have meaning 'going' or 'moving'.

The book Woman in the Shade of Islam by Saudi scholar Abdul Rahman al-Sheha stated that a man may "beat" his wife only if it occurs without "hurting, breaking a bone, leaving blue or black marks on the body and avoiding hitting the face, at any cost."

A widely used 1930 English translation of the Quran by British Muslim scholar Marmaduke Pickthall determined the verse to mean that, as a last resort, men can "scourge" their wives.

Some jurists argue that even when hitting is acceptable under the Qur'an, it is still discountenanced.

In his book No god but God, University of Southern California scholar Reza Aslan, stated that false interpretations of the text have occurred because Quranic commentary "has been the exclusive domain of Muslim men."

The Islamic prophet Mohammed himself, according to Islamic tradition, never once struck a woman in argument. This fact is sometimes cited in debates about the text.

Muslim feminist writer Asra Q. Nomani has argued,

Indeed, Muslim scholars and leaders have long been doing what I call "the 4:34 dance" — they reject outright violence against women but accept a level of aggression that fits contemporary definitions of domestic violence.

Feminist writer Amina Wadud writes in her book, ''Inside the Gender Jihad: Women's Reform in Islam'':

No community will ever be exactly like another. Therefore no community can be a duplicate of that original community. The Quran never states that as a goal. Rather the goal has been to emulate certain key principles of human development; justice, equity, harmony, moral responsibility, spiritual awareness and development.

Ibn Ishaq has said that Muhammad in his The Farewell Sermon said that:

[wives] should not commit any open indecency (Fāḥishah Mubiyya). If they do, then God permits you to shut them in separate rooms and to beat them, but not in a way that causes pain.

Nada Ibrahim of the University of South Australia states that three words—qawwamuna, nushuzahunna, and wadribuhunna—are mistranslated due to the lack of equivalent English alternatives. She explains that in particular, English language Qur'an commentators have not agreed to merely one translation of the word wadribuhunna and that "A clear disagreement exists among English-language Qur’an commentators on how best to translate this word. All translations give an explicit negative connotation, and – when read out of context – further exacerbates any misunderstanding."

According to Sayyed Mostafa Ahmadzadeh, for most commentators, the verse instructs to beat someone “not harshly and severely.” He also suggested that the fear instilled by the verse may change a woman’s behavior more than the physical violence itself:

Based on the psychological dimensions of beating the woman in the verse and the emotional needs of women, if the husband is in an aggressive mode and is ready to hit, this instills fear in the wife. This is also a form of hitting/beating, which is mental than physical. This is perhaps because this form of hitting is more effective than physical hitting and can considerably change a woman’s behavior. Through this, the emotional impact of hitting/beating will be more enormous, compared to the physical impact.

The keywords of Verse 34 of Surah An-Nisa come with various meanings, each of which enables us to know a distinct aspect, meaning and matter. Each aspect, i.e., meanings proposed by commentators, translators, and scholars throughout history for this verse, is according to a distinct wonted system of the family in history. "Zarb" does not mean assault or any form of violence against women. Rather, it means a practical action to inspire disobedient women to obey the legitimate rights of their spouse.

=== When they obey ===
In the Quran's Commentary exegesis of this part of verse is as following:

but if they return to obedience, seek not against them means (of annoyance), meaning, when the wife obeys her husband in all that Allah has allowed, then no means of annoyance from the husband are allowed against his wife. Therefore, in this case, the husband does not have the right to beat her or shun her bed.

=== Glorification of God ===
Ibn Kathir in the commentary of this part of verse says

(Surely, Allah is Ever Most High, Most Great.) reminds men that if they transgress against their wives without justification, then Allah, the Ever Most High, Most Great, is their Protector, and He will exert revenge on those who transgress against their wives and deal with them unjustly.

== See also ==
- Islam and domestic violence
- Criticism of the Qur'an
- Women and Islam
- Female figures in the Qur'an
