= Domestic violence in Saudi Arabia =

The lifetime prevalence of domestic violence in Saudi Arabia is estimated to be between 20%-39% for women, depending on the region in which they live. A 2015 study found that 20% of women visiting primary care centers in Riyadh had experienced domestic violence in the past year.

Further, Saudi Arabia has a guardianship system for women. A man, typically a husband or father, is legally responsible for a woman's choices. In addition to greatly limiting women's freedoms, this poses an issue for women who wish to report domestic violence. An estimated 90% of abusers are also women's guardians. Women are often not permitted to use the phone or leave the house without their guardian's permission, making discrete reporting impossible for many in abusive situations.

In 2013, Saudi Arabia made domestic violence illegal for the first time following a viral DV awareness campaign. The bill, called the Law for Protection from Abuse, criminalized physical, psychological, and sexual abuse, as well requiring employees to report any abuse they witness in the workplace. The Ministry of Social Affairs also established the Domestic Violence Protection Programme, as well as a national hotline to report suspected cases of abuse.

It is difficult to ascertain the impact that the law has had on rates of domestic violence. Reports of DV incidents have increased, which is likely a result of increased reporting rather than increased abuse. There are difficulties in enforcing the law, including obstacles posed by the male guardianship system and broad judicial discretion.

== Immense Legality in Saudi Arabia ==
Domestic abuse in Saudi Arabia started to receive public attention in 2004 after a popular television presenter, Rania al-Baz, was severely beaten by her husband, and photographs of her bruised and swollen face were published in the press. According to Al-Baz, her husband beat her, intending to kill her, after she answered the phone without his permission.

Violence against women and children in the home was traditionally not seen as a criminal matter in Saudi Arabia until 2013. In 2008, "social protection units", Saudi Arabia's version of women's shelters, were ordered by the prime minister to expand in several large Saudi cities. That year the prime minister also ordered the government to draft a national strategy to deal with domestic violence. Some Saudi royal foundations, such as the King Abdulaziz Center for National Dialogue and the King Khalid Foundation, have also led education and awareness efforts against domestic violence. Five years later, in 2013, Saudi Arabia launched its first major effort against domestic violence, the "No More Abuse" ad campaign.

In August 2013, the Saudi cabinet approved a law making domestic violence a criminal offence for the first time. The law calls for a punishment of up to a year in prison and a fine of up to 50,000 riyals (US$13,000). The maximum punishments can be doubled for repeat offenders. The law criminalizes psychological and sexual abuse, as well as physical abuse. It also includes a provision obliging employees to report instances of abuse in the workplace to their employer. The move followed a Twitter campaign. The new laws were welcomed by Saudi women's rights activists.

The number of reported harassment cases against women and juveniles in Saudi Arabia has reached 2,797 in one year, a newspaper stated on quoting official statistics.

A significant amount of domestic violence towards women in Saudi Arabia is related to their lack of autonomy in their own lives. An example of this is male guardianship, which requires a woman to have a male guardian present to make significant decisions such as travel, marriage and sometimes legal transactions.

== Guardianship of women ==
A form of domestic violence that is prominent for women in Saudi Arabia is male guardianship which is also known as Mahram. This system of guardianship by males results in a fully grown woman being treated as a minor with minimal power over their own lives. This system is based on social conventions and also the requirements from religion although there was no official law which mandated it. These types of restrictions include travelling and to whom they marry. Women also find difficulty in making transactions without their male guardian present such as signing contracts for a rental property. Male guardians can be one of a variety of people such as a father, husband or son. As discussed by the Human Rights Watch, a divorced woman whose father is deceased would then have their son as their guardian. In this particular report a woman was placed under the guardianship of her 23-year-old son.

As discussed by Yakin Ertürk (the Special Rapporteur on violence against women), there are various reactions to this system by women living in Saudi Arabia. Some believe that this system is necessary for their protection and feel pampered by their male guardian. However, many believe it limits their lives to a severe extent. Guardianship severely limits women's autonomy, freedom of movement and the exercise of their legal capacity in situations such as marriage. This also impacts their more personal decisions such as decision-making in family matters, education and employment. It is not mandatory to have a male guardian's permission for education and job but Institutes and some employers ask for it.

Although not strictly binding in Saudi Arabian law, there are still many sectors of society that require a guardian for somewhat mundane tasks. In a 2008 Human Rights Watch report it is noted that even if there is no law regarding a decision, the kingdom gives a heavy portion of decision-making to a woman's male guardian. While the government has taken steps to prevent such limitations for women, there is minimal evidence that they are being implemented into society. Even in instances of medical procedures which is an individual's decision in other countries, this is regularly left to the guardian to decide for the woman in question. This will especially be the case if the hospital or medical centre is administered by religious conservatives. There have been cases that include a woman running the risk of facing criminal charges for having an extramarital affair if she enters the hospital to give birth without her male guardian. As hospital staff might suspect the child is from adultery and inform police.

== Recent developments in the guardianship system ==
Although guardianship and other forms of domestic violence are still present in Saudi Arabia, there have been several successful attempts at reform in recent years. These issues have been recognized at a domestic level by King Abdullah, King Salman, and the government of Saudi Arabia alongside international institutions such as the United Nations.

=== International scrutiny ===
The United Nations has become involved in the attempted abolition of the guardianship system. For example. the 2009 ‘Report of the Special Rapporteur on violence against women, its causes and consequences’. This report included recommendations to the Saudi Arabian government in terms of guardianship. Recommendation (a) point 3 recommends “Take measures, including through awareness-raising campaigns, to end the practice of guardianship and abolish existing legal provisions that require a guardian’s authorization, such as those pertaining to women’s travel or access to services or employment.”

In 2008 by the concluding comments of the Committee on the Elimination of Discrimination against Women on Saudi Arabia. discussed relevant issues of male guardianship for women including personal status such as marriage, divorce and child custody. It noted how the guardianship system encourages the patriarchal ideology in society which further discriminates against women. In concluding comment 16 of the report, the Committee urged Saudi Arabia to take immediate steps to abolish the male guardianship system. CEDAW comment that awareness campaigns should be created and that the state should produce a strict timetable with steps to ensure the modify or eliminate practices that discriminate against women in Saudi Arabia.

=== Domestic developments ===
A case that displays a change in regard to a woman's ability to marry was displayed in 2010. This case involved the highest court in Saudi Arabia overturning a decision from five years prior that ruled to annul the marriage between 36-year-old woman Fatima Azzaz and her husband. When wanting to marry it is customary in Saudi Arabia for the woman's guardian to look into the suitors' background, which Ms Azzaz's male relatives did in this case. They were unsatisfied with his tribal background and so with their opinion had attempted to have the marriage annulled, and were successful in 2005. They were able to annul the marriage on the grounds of tribal incompatibility and were successful meaning the couple had to separate.

Azzaz chose at this time to go to shelter with her infant son rather than reside in the family home with her brothers who had successfully separated her from her husband. She was transferred to a state orphanage where she had the couple's second child. After the decision from the Supreme Court in Saudi Arabia in 2009, the couple resumed living together. Voice of Women leader Fawzia al Ayouni stated, "I consider this decision to be a milestone in Saudi modern history, as it loudly screams that we are all equal sons and daughters of this country…”.

This case displayed a significant movement in the proceedings of the courts in Saudi Arabia. This decision was revisited due to a document delivered to King Abdullah which included a petition for review. As stated by Mr al Sudiary (Ms Azzaz's legal representation) the case “…changes many things, including the way courts examine cases presented to it, [and] the types of cases they accept”. This case has been applauded across Saudi Arabia. Human Rights Watch discussed the case as a great victory, not only for the parties involved but for the many other people in a similar situation.

A prominent movement against domestic violence in relation to the male guardianship system was created under the hashtag #Iammyownguardian. This movement began after the 2008 Human Rights Watch report and was started by women who had been fighting the system for over a decade. Activist Aziza Al-Yousef stated that “women should be treated as a full citizen.” With the report and the hashtag on social media site Twitter, a Saudi woman Hala Aldosari wrote a petition that quickly gathered 14,682 signatures after being promoted heavily online under the hashtag. The Saudi King also received approximately 2500 direct telegrams in relation to this petition and the matter of guardianship in their country. In the petition, Aldosari addressed King Salman and urged him to consider the impact the guardianship system had on women in terms of poverty, exploitation and domestic violence.

Since the United Nation Human Rights Council universal period reviews of Saudi Arabia's human rights policies in 2009 and 2013, the government has agreed to work towards abolishing the guardianship system. Small steps have been taken since to lessen control over women by their guardians alongside enactment of laws criminalizing domestic violence.

== See also ==
- Crime in Saudi Arabia
- Islam and domestic violence
- Women's rights in Saudi Arabia
