= Islam and domestic violence =

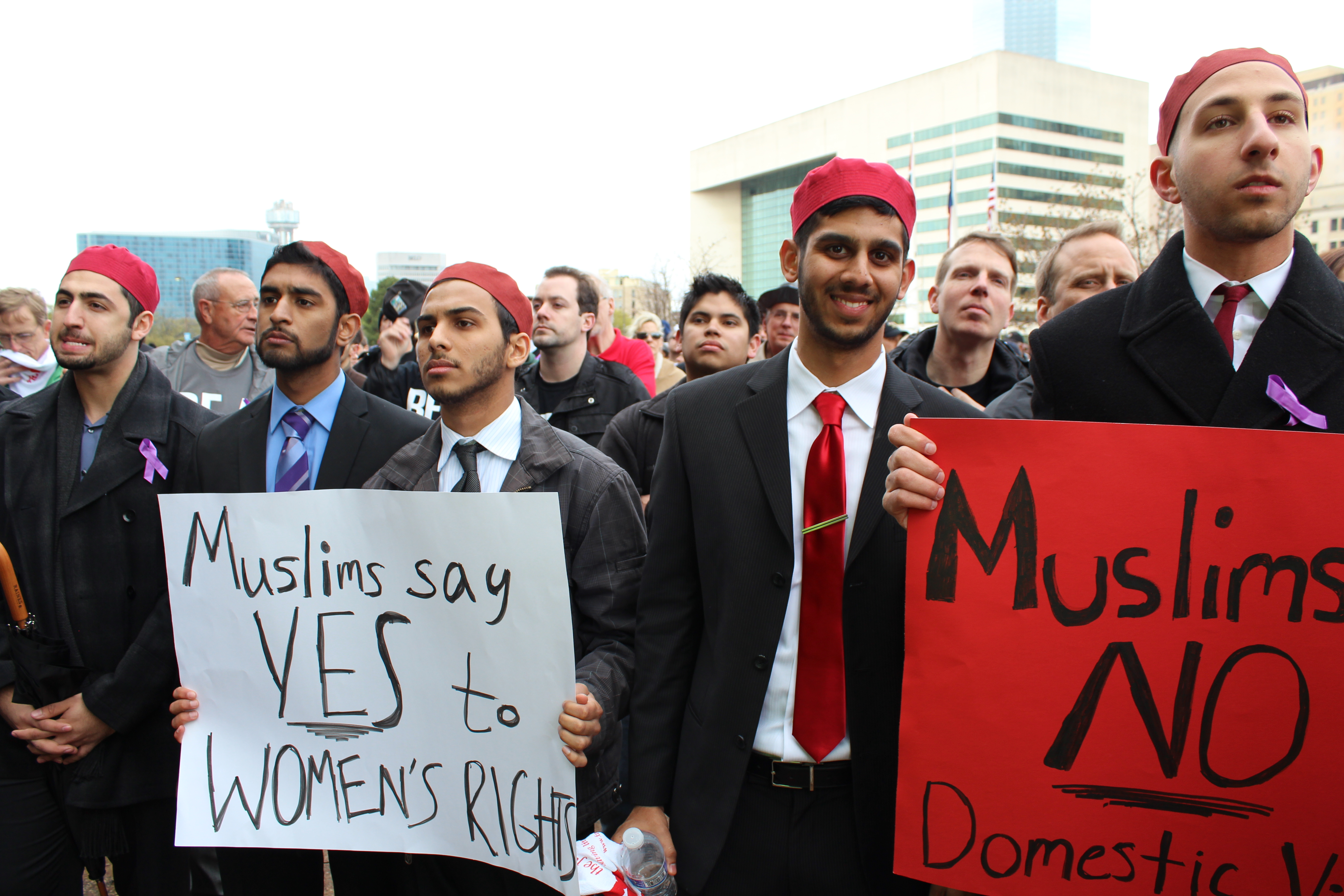
On March 23, 2013, members of Alif Laam Meem, a national Muslim fraternity based at the University of Texas at Dallas, stood up against domestic violence as Muslims and as men of Dallas.

The relationship between Islam and domestic violence is disputed. Even among Muslims, the uses and interpretations of Sharia, the moral code and religious law of Islam, lack consensus. Variations in interpretation are due to different schools of Islamic jurisprudence, histories and politics of religious institutions, conversions, reforms, and education.

Domestic violence among the Muslim community is considered a complicated human rights issue due to varying legal remedies for women by the nations where they live, the extent to which they have support or opportunities to divorce their husbands, cultural stigma to hide evidence of abuse, and inability to have abuse recognized by police or the judicial system in some Muslim nations.

== Definition ==
According to the Merriam-Webster dictionary definition, domestic violence is: "the inflicting of physical injury by one family or household member on another; also: a repeated or habitual pattern of such behavior."

Coomaraswamy defines domestic violence as "violence that occurs within the private sphere, generally between individuals who are related through intimacy, blood or law... [It is] nearly always a gender-specific crime, perpetrated by men against women." It used is as a strong form of control and oppression.

In 1993, The United Nations Declaration on the Elimination of Violence Against Women defined domestic violence as:

Physical, sexual and psychological violence occurring in the family, including battering, sexual abuse of female children in the household, dowry-related violence, marital rape, female genital mutilation and other traditional practices harmful to women, non-spousal violence and violence related to exploitation.

== Islamic texts ==
=== In the Quran ===
Use, by country, of Sharia for legal matters relating to women: Sharia plays no role in the judicial system Sharia applies in personal status issues Sharia applies in full, including criminal law Regional variations in the application of sharia

The interpretation of An-Nisa 34 has been subject to considerable scholarly debate. Various translations render the verse’s directive differently—ranging from “strike them” to “(lightly) strike them,” “beat them,” “scourge them,” or “take practical action with them.”

The key point of dispute centers on the Arabic term "ضَرْب" (ḍarb), which can imply actions ranging from a symbolic, light tap to a more severe physical act. Some modern scholars argue that the term should be understood metaphorically or as a means of corrective discipline, rather than a literal command to inflict physical harm. Others maintain a more literal interpretation, consistent with traditional exegesis. This divergence highlights the broader issues of cultural context, historical usage, and linguistic nuance in interpreting Quranic texts.

Quran 4:34 reads:

Men are the protectors and maintainers of women, because Allah has given the one more (strength) than the other, and because they support them from their means. Therefore the righteous women are devoutly obedient, and guard in (the husband's) absence what Allah would have them guard. As to those women on whose part ye fear disloyalty and ill-conduct, admonish them (first), (Next), refuse to share their beds, (And last) strike them (lightly); but if they return to obedience, seek not against them Means (of annoyance): For Allah is Most High, great (above you all).

— Quran 4:34 ^{(Translated by Yusuf Ali)}

=== Quran interpretations that support domestic violence ===
Lisa Hajjar claims Shari'a law encourages "domestic violence" against women when a husband suspects nushuz (disobedience, disloyalty, rebellion, ill conduct) in his wife. Other scholars claim wife beating, for nashizah, is not consistent with modern perspectives of Qur'an. Some conservative translations find that Muslim husbands are permitted to act what is known in Arabic as Idribuhunna with the use of "Strike," and sometimes as much as to hit, chastise, or beat.

In some exegesis such as those of Ibn Kathir (1300 - 1373AD) and Muhammad ibn Jarir al-Tabari (839 - 923AD), the actions prescribed in Surah 4:34 above, are to be taken in sequence: the husband is to admonish the wife, after which (if his previous correction was unsuccessful) he may remain separate from her, after which (if his previous correction was still unsuccessful) he may (Note: Abdullah Yusuf Ali in his Quranic commentary states that: "In case of family jars four steps are mentioned, to be taken in that order. (1) Perhaps verbal advice or admonition may be sufficient; (2) if not, sex relations may be suspended; (3) if this is not sufficient, some slight physical correction may be administered; but Imam Shafi'i considers this inadvisable, though permissible, and all authorities are unanimous in deprecating any sort of cruelty, even of the nagging kind, as mentioned in the next clause; (4) if all this fails, a family council is recommended in passage 4:35.") (Note: Sheikh Yusuf al-Qaradawi, head of the European Council for Fatwa and Research, says that "If the husband senses that feelings of disobedience and rebelliousness are rising against him in his wife, he should try his best to rectify her attitude by kind words, gentle persuasion, and reasoning with her. If this is not helpful, he should sleep apart from her, trying to awaken her agreeable feminine nature so that serenity may be restored, and she may respond to him in a harmonious fashion. If this approach fails, it is permissible for him to beat her lightly with his hands, avoiding her face and other sensitive parts.") give her a light tapping with a Siwak. Ibn 'Abbas, The Cousin of the Prophet, is recorded in the Tafsir of al-Tabari for verse 4:34 as saying that beating without severity is using a siwak (small toothbrush) or a similar object.

A translated passage by Taqi-ud-Din al-Hilali and Muhsin Khan in 2007 defines men as the protectors, guardians and maintainers of women, because Allah has made the one of them to excel the other, and because they spend (to support them) from their means. Upon seeing ill-conduct (i.e. disobedience, rebellion, nashuz in Arabic) by his wife, a man may admonish them (first), (next), refuse to share their beds, (and last) beat them (lightly, if it is useful), but if they return to obedience, seek not against them means.

Some Islamic scholars and commentators have emphasized that hitting, even where permitted, is not to be harsh (Note: Ibn Kathir Ad-Damishqee records in his Tafsir Al-Qur'an Al-Azim that "Ibn `Abbas and several others said that the Ayah refers to a beating that is not violent. Al-Hasan Al-Basri said that it means, a beating that is not severe.") or some even contend that they should be "more or less symbolic." (Note: One such authority is the earliest hafiz, Ibn Abbas.) According to Abdullah Yusuf Ali and Ibn Kathir, the consensus of Islamic scholars is that the above verse describes a light beating. Abu Shaqqa refers to the edict of Hanafi scholar al-Jassas (d. 981) who notes that the reprimand should be "A non-violent blow with siwak [a small stick used to clean the teeth] or similar. This means that to hit with any other means is legally Islamically forbidden."

=== Quran interpretations that do not support domestic violence ===
Indicating the subjective nature of the translations, particularly regarding domestic abuse, Ahmed Ali's 1984 English translation of the word idribu is "to forsake, avoid, or leave." His English translation of Quran 4:34 is:

... As for women you feel are averse, talk to them cursively; then leave them alone in bed (without molesting them), and go to bed with them (when they are willing).

However, in his native Urdu translation of verse 4:34, he translates idribuhunna as "strike them."

Laleh Bakhtiar postulates that daraba is defined as "to go away." This interpretation is supported by the fact that the word darabtum, which means to "go abroad" in the sake of Allah, is used in the same Surah (in 4:94) and is derived from the same root word (daraba) as idribuhunna in 4:34. However, this translation is negated by the fact that most definitions of daraba in Edward William Lane's Arabic-English Lexicon are related to physical beating and that when the root word daraba and its derivatives are used in the Qur'an in relation to humans or their body parts, it exclusively means physically striking them with a siwak ('toothbrush'). (Note: For example, in: Qur'an 2:7337:93, 8:12, 8:50, 47:4 and 47:27.)

The keywords of Verse 34 of Surah An-Nisa come with various meanings, each of which enables us to know a distinct aspect, meaning and matter. Each aspect, i.e., meanings proposed by commentators, translators, and scholars throughout history for this verse, is according to a distinct wonted system of the family in history. Zarb does not mean assault or any form of violence against women. Rather, it means a practical action to inspire disobedient women to obey the legitimate rights of their spouse.

== Jurisprudence ==
The discussions in all four Sunni law schools institutionalised the viewpoint of the Quranic exegeses by turning wife-beating into a means of discipline against rebellious wives.

Ayesha Chaudhry has examined the pre-colonial Hanafi texts on domestic violence. Her findings are as follows. Hanafi scholars emphasised the procedure of admonishing, abandoning and hitting the wife. The Hanafi jurists say that it is the husband's duty to physically discipline his wife's arrogance (nushuz). While Hanafi scholars admonish husbands to treat their wives with kindness and equity, they do not recognize the principle of qisas (retributive punishment) for injuries sustained in marriage, unless they cause death, permitting the husband to hit his wife without any liability. Their only condition is that the beating must not kill her; this view was taken from Hanafi scholar Al-Jassas and within this framework they emphasised the need of following the sequence of admonishment, abandonment and hitting. However, al-Jassas also says that the reprimand should only be "A non-violent blow with siwak [a small stick used to clean the teeth] or something similar to it.

According to Ayesha Chaudhary, unlike Hanafi scholars who were more interested in protecting a husband's right to hit his wife for disciplinary purposes, the Malikis tried to stop husbands from abusing this right. The Maliki scholars only allowed striking a rebellious wife with the purpose of rectifying her. They specified that the strike should not be extreme or severe, must not leave marks or cause injuries and that the strike must not be fearsome, cause fractures, break bones, cause disfiguring wounds while punching in general and punching her in the chest were unacceptable and that the strike could not harm the wife. The Malikis held that a husband would be legally liable if the hitting led to the wife's death. They also did not allow a husband to hit his wife if he did not believe the hitting would cause her to stop her arrogance. The Shafi'i scholars upheld the permissibility of wife beating but encouraged avoiding it and did not hold the imperative "wa-ḍribūhunna" to mean an obligatory command. Shafi scholars also restricted what the husband could do in regards to hitting his wife, that he should only hit his wife if he thinks it will be effective in deterring her from her arrogance; he should hit her in a non-extreme (ghayr mubarrih) manner; he should avoid hitting her face, sensitive places, and places of beauty and not hit her in a manner that causes disfiguration, bleeding, that he should not hit the same place repeatedly, loss of limbs, or death. According to Shafi scholars a husband is permitted to hit his wife with a cloth, sandal and a siwak but not with a whip. The views of the Hanbali scholars are a mix of the positions of the other three schools of law.

Evidence of judicial records from the sixteenth century on wards show that Ottoman judges who followed the Hanafi school allowed divorce because of abuse. This did this partially by borrowing rulings from other schools of thought and partially by blending abuse with blasphemy since they reasoned a "true Muslim would not beat his wife."

A number of women in British India between the years of 1920 and 1930s left Islam to obtain judicial divorce because Hanafi law did not permit women to seek divorce in case of cruel treatment by a husband. Mawlana Thanawi reviewed the issue and borrowed the Maliki rulings which permits women to seek divorce because of cruelty by the husband. He expanded the grounds of divorce available to women under Hanafi law.

=== Undesirability of beating ===
Jonathan A.C. Brown says:

The vast majority of the ulama across the Sunni schools of law inherited the Prophet's unease over domestic violence and placed further restrictions on the evident meaning of the 'Wife Beating Verse'. A leading Meccan scholar from the second generation of Muslims, Ata' bin Abi Rabah, counseled a husband not to beat his wife even if she ignored him but rather to express his anger in some other way. Darimi, a teacher of both Tirmidhi and Muslim bin Hajjaj as well as a leading early scholar in Iran, collected all the Hadiths showing Muhammad's disapproval of beating in a chapter entitled 'The Prohibition on Striking Women'. A thirteenth-century scholar from Granada, Ibn Faras, notes that one camp of ulama had staked out a stance forbidding striking a wife altogether, declaring it contrary to the Prophet's example and denying the authenticity of any Hadiths that seemed to permit beating. Even Ibn Hajar, the pillar of late medieval Sunni Hadith scholarship, concludes that, contrary to what seems to be an explicit command in the Qur'an, the Hadiths of the Prophet leave no doubt that striking one's wife to discipline her actually falls under the Shariah ruling of 'strongly disliked' or 'disliked verging on prohibited'.

According to Honour, Violence, Women and Islam, and Islamic scholar Dr. Muhammad Sharif Chaudhry, Muhammad condemns violence against women, by saying: "How loathsome (Ajeeb) it is that one of you should hit his wife as a slave is hit, and then sleep with her at the end of the day."

=== Restraint in beating ===
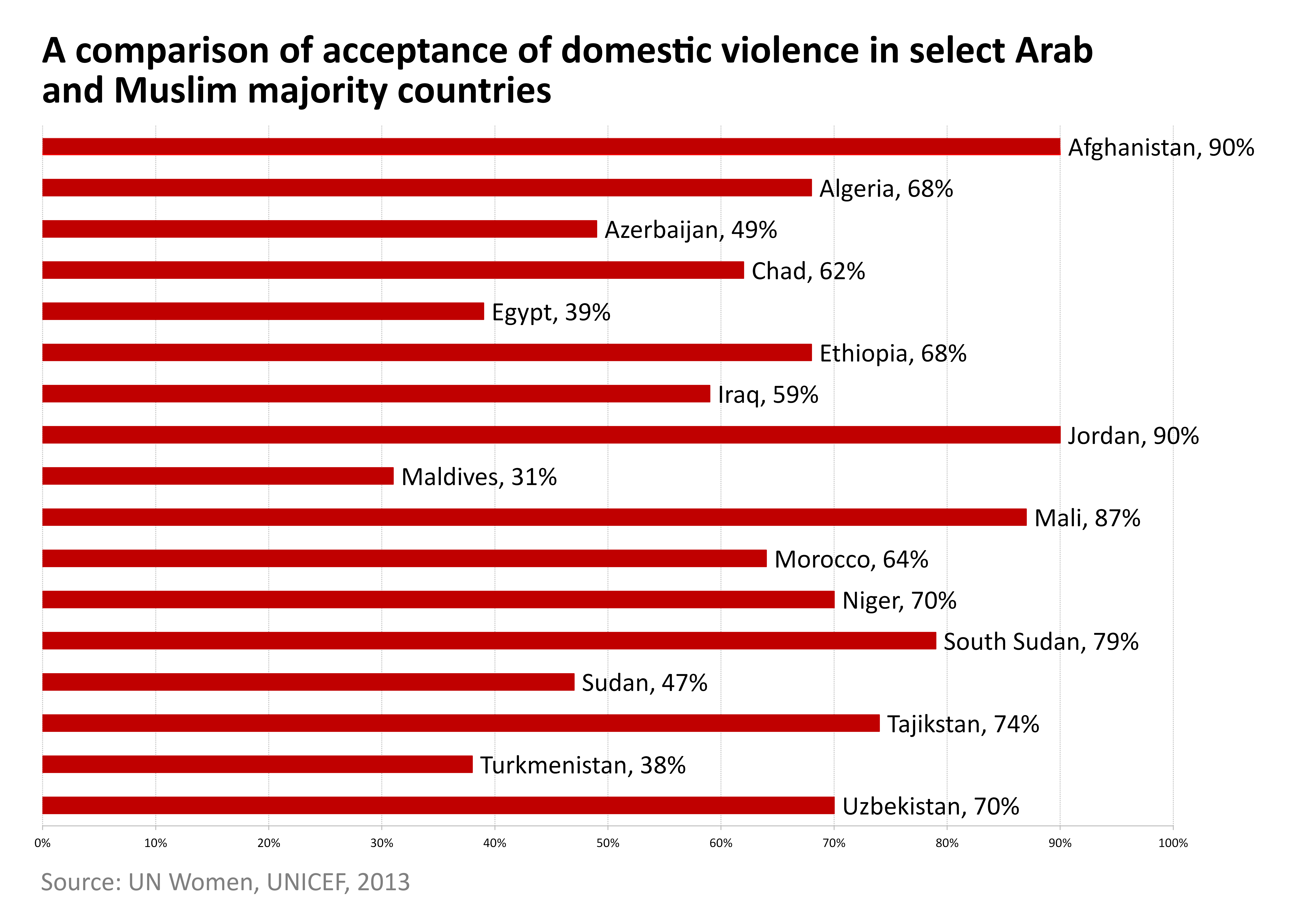
Percentage of women aged 15–49 who think that a husband/partner is justified in hitting his wife/partner under certain circumstances, in some Arab and Muslim majority countries, according to UNICEF (2013)

Scholars and commentators have stated that Muhammad directed men not to hit their wives' faces, not to beat their wives in such a way as would leave marks on their body, (Note: Muhammad is attributed to say in the Farewell Sermon: "And if they commit open sexual misconduct you have the right to leave them alone in their beds and [if even then, they do not listen] beat them such that this should not leave any mark on them." Sunan Ibn Maja 1841.) and not to beat their wives as to cause pain (ghayr mubarrih). Scholars too have stipulated against beating or disfigurement, with others such as the Syrian jurist Ibn Abidin prescribing ta'zir punishments against abusive husbands.

In a certain hadith, Muhammad discouraged beating one's wife severely. Bahz bin Hakim reported on the authority of his father from his grandfather (Mu'awiyah ibn Haydah) as saying:

I said: Messenger of Allah, how should we approach our wives and how should we leave them? He replied: Approach your tilth when or how you will, give her (your wife) food when you take food, clothe when you clothe yourself, do not revile her face, and do not beat her.

The same hadith has been narrated with slightly different wording. In other versions of this hadith, only beating the face is discouraged.

Some jurists argue that even when beating is acceptable under the Quran, it is still discouraged. (Note: Sayyid Abul Ala Maududi comments that "Whenever the Prophet permitted a man to administer corporal punishment to his wife, he did so with reluctance, and continued to express his distaste for it. And even in cases where it is necessary, the Prophet directed men not to hit across the face, nor to beat severely nor to use anything that might leave marks on the body." "Towards Understanding the Qur'an" Translation by Zafar I. Ansari from "Tafheem Al-Qur'an" (specifically, commentary on 4:34) by Syed Abul-A'ala Mawdudi, Islamic Foundation, Leicester, England.) (Note: The medieval jurist ash-Shafi'i, founder of one of the main schools of Sunni fiqh, commented on this verse that "hitting is permitted, but not hitting is preferable.") (Note: "Some of the greatest Muslim scholars (e.g., Ash-Shafi'i) are of the opinion that it is just barely permissible, and should preferably be avoided: and they justify this opinion by the Prophet's personal feelings with regard to this problem." Muhammad Asad, The Message of the Qur'an (his translation of the Qur'an).) Ibn Kathir in concluding his exegesis exhorts men to not beat their wives, quoting a hadith from Muhammad: "Do not hit God's servants" (here referring to women). The narration continues, stating that some while after the edict, "Umar complained to the Messenger of God that many women turned against their husbands. Muhammad gave his permission that the men could hit their wives in cases of rebelliousness. The women then turned to the wives of the Prophet and complained about their husbands. The Prophet said: 'Many women have turned to my family complaining about their husbands. Verily, these men are not among the best of you."

== Incidence among Muslims ==
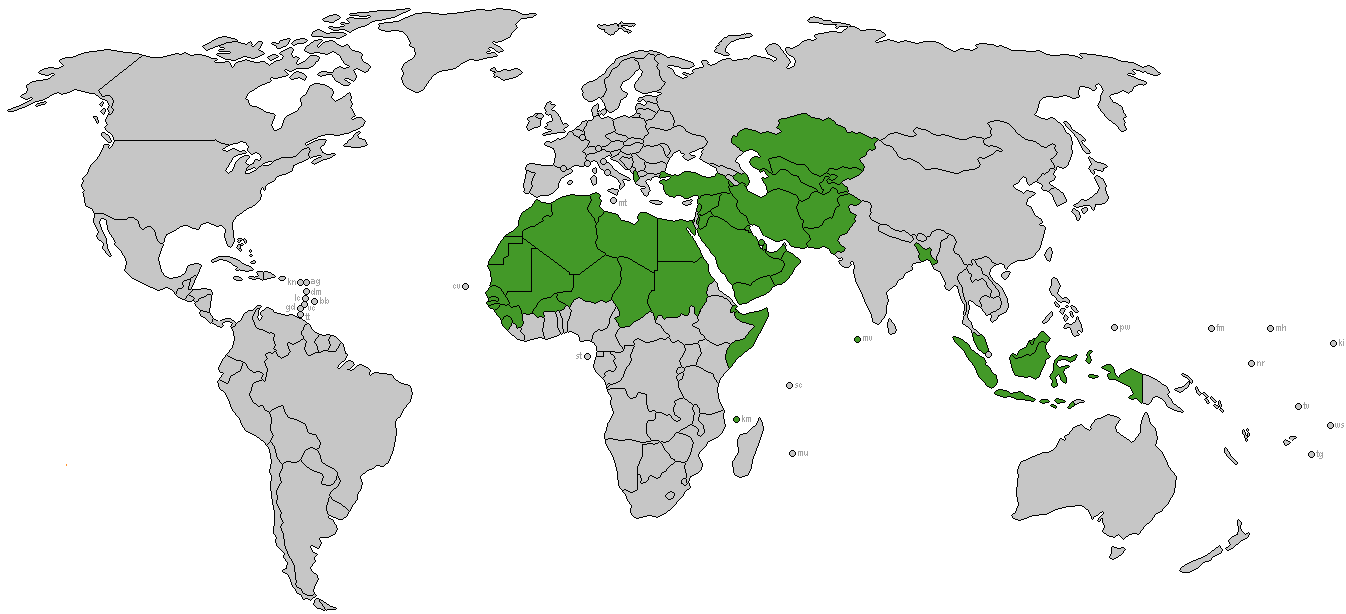
Muslim-majority countries

Domestic violence is considered to be a problem in Muslim-majority cultures, where women face social pressures to submit to violent husbands and not file charges or flee.

In deference to Surah 4:34, many nations with Shari'a law have refused to consider or prosecute cases of "domestic abuse." In 2010, the highest court of United Arab Emirates (Federal Supreme Court) considered a lower court's ruling, and upheld a husband's right to "chastise" his wife and children physically. Article 53 of the United Arab Emirates' penal code acknowledges the right of a "chastisement by a husband to his wife and the chastisement of minor children" so long as the assault does not exceed the limits prescribed by Shari'a. The Council of Islamic Ideology, a constitutional body of Pakistan that advises the government on the compatibility of laws with Islam, has recommended authorizing husbands to ‘lightly’ beat disobedient wives. When asked why is beating a wife lightly permitted, the chairman of Pakistan's Council of Islamic Ideology, Mullah Maulana Sheerani said, "The recommendations are according to the Quran and Sunnah. You can not ask someone to reconsider the Quran". In Lebanon, KAFA, an organization campaigning against violence and the exploitation of women, alleges that as many as three-quarters of all Lebanese females have suffered physically at the hands of husbands or male relatives at some point in their lives. An effort has been underway to remove domestic violence cases from Shari'a driven religious courts to civil penal code driven courts. Social workers claim failure of religious courts in addressing numerous instances of domestic abuse in Syria, Pakistan, Egypt, Palestine, Morocco, Iran, Yemen and Saudi Arabia. In 2013, Saudi Arabia approved a new law on domestic violence, which sets penalties for all types of sexual and physical abuse, in the workplace and at home. Penalties can be up to a year in prison and a fine up to 13,000 dollars. The law also provides shelter for the victims of domestic violence.

According to Pamela K. Taylor, co-founder of Muslims for Progressive Values, such violence is not part of the religion, but rather more of a cultural aspect. In the academic publication Honour, Violence, Women and Islam edited by Mohammad Mazher Idriss and Tahir Abbas, it is said that there is no authority in the Quran for the type of regular and frequent acts of violence that women experience from their abusive husbands. Furthermore, the actions of many Muslim husbands lack the expected level of control in two elements from the verse, admonishment and separation. The separation dictates not only the physical separation, but also abstinence from marital sex.

Nation	Information on Incidence
Afghanistan	According to HRW 2013 report, Afghanistan has one of the highest incidence rates of domestic violence in the world. Domestic violence is so common that 85 per cent of women admit to experiencing it. 60% of all women report being victims of multiple forms of serial violence. Afghanistan is one of the few countries in which the female suicide rate is higher than that of males. Psychologists attribute this to an endless cycle of domestic violence and poverty.
Bangladesh	Further information: Domestic violence in Bangladesh According to a WHO, United Nations study, 30% of women in rural Bangladesh reported their first sexual experience to be forced. About 40% report having experienced domestic violence from their intimate partner, and 50% in rural regions report experiencing sexual violence. Statistics from four United Nations studies, from 1990s, show that 16-19% of the women (age less than 50) were victims of domestic abuse within the previous 12-month period. 40-47% of the women had been subject to domestic violence during some period of their life. The studies were performed in villages (1992, 1993), Dhaka (2002) and Matlab (2002). About 90% of women in Bangladesh are practicing Muslims, which indicates that many Muslim women are victims of physical domestic violence in this country. From a World Health Organization (WHO) study, of which Bangladesh was 1 of 10 participating countries, it was found that less than 2% of domestic abuse victims seek support from the community to resolve abusive situations, primarily because they know that they won't receive the support they need to remedy the issue. Naved and Perrson write in their article "Factors Associated with Physical Spousal Abuse of Women During Pregnancy in Bangladesh" that women who are pregnant are more likely to be abused. A study on Pakistan Rural Access and Mobility Study (PRAMS) data showed that 67% of perpetrators were husbands or partners". Bangladesh was found to be one of the countries with a high rate of domestic violence resulting in death during pregnancy by a United Nations study. (Note: India and United States were also noted as countries with a high prevalence of death during pregnancy due to domestic abuse.)
Egypt	A 2012 United Nations Women's study found that 33% of women in Egypt have experienced physical domestic violence in their lifetime, while 18% report having experienced domestic physical violence in last 12 months. Another United Nations national study in 1995, 13% of the women (age 15–49) were victims of domestic abuse within the previous 12-month period. 34% of the women had been subject to domestic violence during some period of their life. In a 2004 study of pregnant women in El-Sheik Zayed 11% of the women (age 15–49) studied were victims of domestic abuse within the previous 12-month period and, also, during some period of their life. According to Egyptian Centre for Women's Rights and World Bank Social Development Group's 2010 report, 85% of Egyptian women report of having experienced sexual harassment.
India	Main article: Domestic violence in India Muslim women in medieval India were subservient. They were devoted to their husbands and would bear the physical and psychological violence inflicted on them by their husbands or in-laws. Sultan Nasir-ud-din refused to provide his wife with a servant after her fingers were burnt while baking bread for him. She never expressed her complaint again. Mughis tortured his wife, the sister of Sultan Muhammad bin Tughluq, to death. During the rule of Sikandar Lodi a husband was reported to have used force on his wife after he falsely accused her of stealing a jewel. Khwaja Muazzam was known for his mistreatment of his wife whom he eventually murdered. In one account narrated by Tavernier a physician once threw his wife off a roof. She sustained broken ribs but survived. On the second occasion, the physician stabbed his wife and children to death but the governor whom the physician was working under did not take any action. A collection of legal documents and contracts from the time of Akbar, called Munshat i Namakin, reveal that Muslim brides would often make four stipulations in their marriage contracts. If the husband violated these conditions, the wife would be entitled to divorce. These were conditions such as the husband would not marry a second wife or take a concubine. Another condition was that the husband would not beat the wife in a way which would leave a mark on her body, unless she was guilty of a serious offence. A miniature from the time of Akbar's reign shows a husband lashing his wife on the buttocks with a stick. This reflects the stipulation found in marriage contracts of that time which were against beating in such a way that it would leave any mark on the body. One 17th century Muslim marriage contract from Surat, examined by Shireen Moosvi, contained a stipulation by the bride, Maryam, that her husband, Muhammad Jiu, would give her a specific amount of maintenance. The amount of maintenance which was specified in it indicated that the couple belonged to the lower middle class. However, the marriage contract contained no stipulation against wife-beating. This reflects that women of that socio-economic class were expected to submit to any kind of violence by their husbands.
Indonesia	The World Health Organization reported sharply increasing rates of domestic violence in Indonesia, with over 25,000 cases in 2007. Nearly 3 in 4 cases, it is the husband beating the wife; the next largest reported category were the in-laws abusing the wife. The higher rates may be because more cases of violence against women are being reported in Indonesia, rather than going unreported, than before. From a United Nations study of Central Java, 2% of the women (age 15–49) were victims of domestic abuse within the previous 12-month period. 11% of the women had been subject to domestic violence during some period of their life.
Iraq	Another study had done a cross sectional examination between 2 different groups. Group 1 (G1) representing Christian culture in the Ankawa district, then group 2 (G2) representing Muslim culture in the Erbil city district. The overall results had stated that overall level of violence (physical and or sexual) was 2% higher in Group 2(20%). In addition to, psychological violence was 40% in group 2 whereas compared group 1 it was only 24%. Although these factors may indicate that Islam may be the cause of the violence, it has been reported that factors that gave major influence were alcoholic husbands and the wives having to do manual work, compared to professionals in the area of Erbil for group 2.
Iran	Main article: Domestic violence in Iran In Iran the nature of domestic violence is complicated by both a national culture and authoritative state that support control, oppression and violence against women. A World Health Organization (WHO) study in Babol found that within the previous year 15.0% of wives had been physically abused, 42.4% had been sexually abused and 81.5% had been psychologically abused (to various degrees) by their husbands, blaming low income, young age, unemployment and low education. In 2004 a study of domestic violence was undertaken by the Women's Center for Presidential Advisory, Ministry of Higher Education and The Interior Ministry of capital cities in Iran's 28 provinces. 66% married women in Iran are subjected to some kind of domestic violence in the first year of their marriage, either by their husbands or by their in-laws. All married women who were participants in this study in Iran have experienced 7.4% of the 9 categories of abuse. The likelihood of being subject to violence varied: The more children in a family or the more rural the family lived, the greater the likelihood of domestic violence; Educated and career women were less likely to be victims of abuse. 9.63% of women in the study reported wishing their husbands would die, as a result of the abuse they have experienced. The prevalence of domestic violence has been cited as a cause of high rates of suicide, mostly through self-immolation, among Kurdish women in Iran.
Jordan	The 2012 United Nations Women's study found that at least 1 in 5 women in Jordan has experienced physical domestic violence in her lifetime, while 1 in 7 reports having experienced domestic physical violence in last 12 months. Islamic scholars claim mundane domestic violence such as slapping and battering by husband orfamily members is hugely unreported in Jordan, along with other Middle Eastern countries.
Morocco	In Morocco, the most common reason women seek to end a marriage is to extricate themselves from a situation in which they are vulnerable to domestic violence, as 28,000 acts of domestic violence was reported between 1984 and 1998.
Pakistan	Main articles: Violence against women in Pakistan and Domestic violence in Pakistan A 2011 report claims 80% of women in Pakistan suffer from domestic abuse. A 2004 study claimed 50% of the women in Pakistan are physically battered and 90% are mentally and verbally abused by their men, while other reports claim domestic violence rates between 70% and over 95% in Pakistan. Earlier studies from 1970s to 1990s suggest similar incidence rates of domestic violence in Pakistan. In Pakistan, domestic violence occurs in forms of beatings, sexual violence, torture, mutilation, acid attacks and burning the victim alive (bride burning). According to the Pakistan Institute of Medical Sciences in 2002, over 90% of married Pakistani women surveyed reported being kicked, slapped, beaten or sexually abused by their husbands and in-laws. Over 90% of Pakistani women consider domestic violence as a norm of every woman's married life. Between 1998 and 2003 there were more than 2,666 women killed in honor killings by a family member. The Thomson Reuters Foundation has ranked Pakistan third on the list of most dangerous countries for women in the world.
Gaza Strip	In one study, half of 120 women interviewed in the Gaza Strip had been the victims of domestic violence.
Saudi Arabia	Main article: Domestic violence in Saudi Arabia Saudi Arabia’s National Family Protection Program estimates that 35 percent of Saudi women have experienced violence. In some recent high-profile cases such as that of Rania al-Baz, Muslim women have publicized their mistreatment at the hands of their husbands, in hopes that public condemnation of wife-beating will end toleration of the practice.
Syria	Further information: Domestic violence in Syria One recent study, in Syria, found that 25% of the married women surveyed said that they had been beaten by their husbands. Another study found that 21.8% of women have experienced some form of domestic violence; 48% of the women who experienced some form of violence had been beaten.
Turkey	Main article: Domestic violence in Turkey A 2009 study published by the Government of Turkey reports widespread domestic violence against women in Turkey. In urban and rural areas, 40% of Turkish women reported having experienced spousal violence in their lifetime, 10% of all women reported of domestic abuse within last 12 months. In the 15-24 year age group, 20% of the women reported of domestic violence by their husbands or male members of their family. The domestic violence ranged from slapping, battering and other forms of violence. The injuries, as a result of the reported domestic violence included bleeding, broken bones and other forms needing medical attention. Over half reported severe injuries. A third of all women who admitted domestic abuse cases, claimed having suffered repeat domestic abuse injuries in excess of 5 times. Another United Nations study in East and South-East Anatolia in 1998, 58% of the women (age 14–75) had been subject to domestic violence during some period of their life; some of the women in the sampling had never been in a relationship which might have otherwise resulted in a higher statistic.

== Laws and prosecution ==
According to Ahmad Shafaat, an Islamic scholar, "If the husband beats a wife without respecting the limits set down by the Qur'an and Hadith, then she can take him to court and if ruled in favor has the right to apply the law of retaliation and beat the husband as he beat her." However, laws against domestic violence, as well as whether these laws are enforced, vary throughout the Muslim world.

Some women want to fight the abuses they face as Muslims; these women want "to retain the communal extended family aspects of traditional society, while eliminating its worst abuses, by seeking easy ability to divorce men for abuse and forced marriages."

Nation	Laws and prosecution
Bangladesh	The Domestic Violence (Protection and Prevention) Act, 2010 was passed on 5 October 2010 to prosecute abusers and provide services to victims. To implement the law, research is needed to identify steps required to support the law.
Egypt	The Egyptian Penal Code was amended to no longer provide impunity (legal protection) to men who married the women that they raped. In 2020, protests have been mounted against Article 237 of the Egyptian Penal Code which allows for a lesser punishment for men who kill their wives than for other forms of murder.
Iran	Existing laws (Iranian Code of Criminal Procedure articles 42, 43, 66) intend to prohibit violence in the form of kidnapping, gender-based harassment, abuse of pregnant women and "crimes against rights and responsibilities within the family structure," but due to cultural and political culture do not protect women, prosecute their abusers and provide services to victims. The government has laws that support violence against women in the case of adultery, including flogging, imprisonment and death. Laws to better enforce existing laws and protect women against violence were placed before the Iranian parliament the week ending 16 September 2011, focusing on both protection and prevention of violence against women, including focus on human trafficking, better protection and services for abuse victims, rehabilitation (especially concerning domestic abuse) and better processes to manage questioning of female offenders. One of the keys to ultimate success is altering community cultural views regarding the use of violence against women.
Morocco	In 1993 as a response to the women's rights activism against aspects of Moroccan family law that are discriminatory or otherwise harmful to women, King Hassan II had instituted some modest reforms of the Mudawwana, and in 1998, he authorized Prime Minister El-Yousoufi to propose further changes. When King Hassan II died in 1999, the throne passed to his son, Muhammad VI, who committed to bolder reforms to improve the status of women. Opponents of the plan argued that this reform conflicted with women's duties to their husbands and contravene their sharia-based status as legal minors. However, the controversy marked by the huge competing demonstrations intimidated the government, which led to the withdrawal of the plan.
Pakistan	With the exception of Islamabad Capital Territory, domestic violence is not explicitly prohibited in Pakistani domestic law and most acts of domestic violence are encompassed by the Qisas (retaliation) and Diyat (compensation) Ordinance. Nahida Mahboob Elahi, a human rights lawyer, has said that new laws are needed to better protect women: "There needs to be special legislation on domestic violence and in that context they must mention that this is violence and a crime." Police and judges often tend to treat domestic violence as a non-justiciable, private or family matter or, an issue for civil courts, rather than criminal courts. In Pakistan, "police often refuse to register cases unless there are obvious signs of injury and judges sometimes seem to sympathise with the husbands." In 2008, campaigners said that at a time when violence against women is rampant in Pakistani society this so-called women's protection bill encourages men to abuse their wives. In 2009, a Domestic Violence Protection bill was proposed by Yasmeen Rehman of the Pakistan People’s Party. It was passed in the National Assembly but subsequently failed to be passed in the second chamber of parliament, the Senate, within the prescribed period of time. The Council of Islamic Ideology objected to the bill, claiming in its current form it would increase divorces and that it ignored adult male victims of domestic violence. After the passage of Eighteenth constitutional amendment, the matter pertaining to the bill became a provincial issue. It was re-tabled in 2012, but met with a deadlock in parliament because of stiff opposition from the religious right. Representatives of Islamic organizations vowed resistance to the proposed bill, describing it as "anti-Islamic" and an attempt to promote "Western cultural values" in Pakistan. They asked for the bill to be reviewed before being approved by the parliament. The bill was eventually passed for Islamabad Capital Territory on 20 February 2012.
Saudi Arabia	Only in 2004, after international attention was drawn to the case of Rania al-Baz, was there the first successful prosecution for domestic violence.
Turkey	Honor killings are now punishable by life imprisonment and Turkish law no longer provides impunity (legal protection) to men who married the women that they raped.
Tunisia	In Tunisia, domestic violence is illegal and punishable by five years in prison.

== Victim support programs ==
In Malaysia, the largest government-run hospital implemented a program to intervene in cases where domestic violence seems possible. The woman is brought to a room to meet with a counselor who works with the patient to determine if the woman is in danger and should be transferred to a shelter for safety. If the woman does not wish to go to the shelter, she is encouraged to see a social worker and file a police report. If the injury is very serious, investigations begin immediately. (Note: The model for assessing patient safety and providing shelter, social worker and investigative support is being implemented in other Asian countries and in South Africa.)

== Divorce ==
Though some Muslim scholars, such as Ahmad Shafaat, contend that Islam permits women to be divorced in cases of domestic violence. Divorce may be unavailable to women as a practical or legal matter.

The Quran states: (2:231) And when you have divorced women and they have fulfilled the term of their prescribed period, either take them back on reasonable basis or set them free on reasonable basis. But do not take them back to hurt them, and whoever does that, then he has wronged himself. And treat not the Verses of Allah as a jest, but remember Allah's Favours on you, and that which He has sent down to you of the Book and Al-Hikmah [the Prophet's Sunnah, legal ways, Islamic jurisprudence] whereby He instructs you. And fear Allah, and know that Allah is All-Aware of everything.

Although Islam permits women to divorce for domestic violence, they are subject to the laws of their nation which might make it quite difficult for a woman to obtain a divorce.

Most women's rights activists concede that while divorce can provide potential relief, it does not constitute an adequate protection or even an option for many women, with discouraging factors such as lack of resources or support to establish alternative domestic arrangements and social expectations and pressures.

== See also ==
- AHA Foundation, non-profit for women's rights in western countries
- Dowry death
- Female infanticide
- Femicide
- Gender roles in Islam
- Glossary of Islam
- Islamic feminism
- Peaceful Families Project - Muslim organization
- Sharia#Women
- Taliban treatment of women
- Violence against women
- Women and Islam

Other

- International Journal for the Psychology of Religion
- Outline of domestic violence
- Victimology
- Christianity and domestic violence
- Violence against women
- Women's rights
