= Crime in Saudi Arabia =

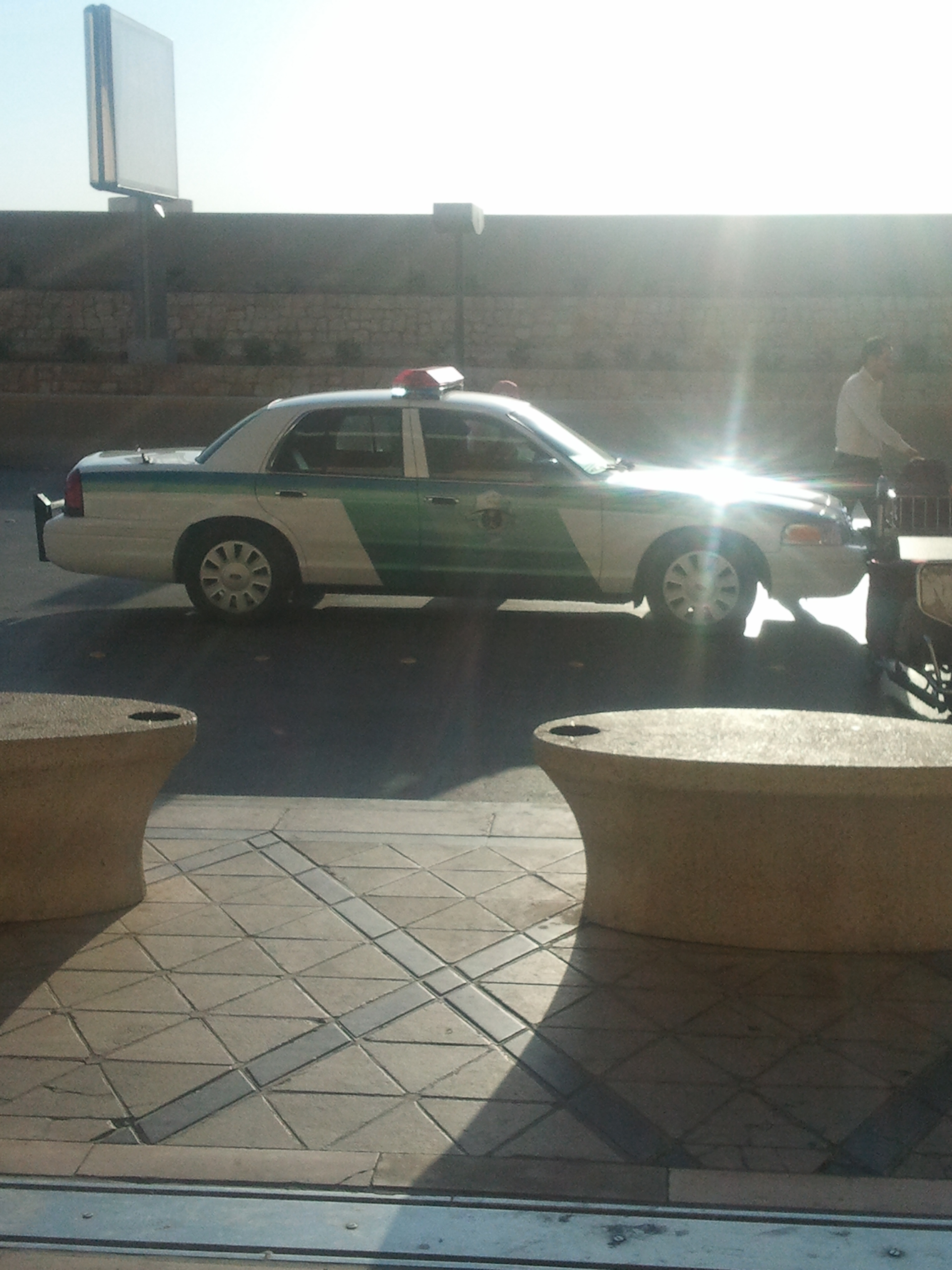
A traffic police car in Riyadh

Crime in Saudi Arabia is low compared to industrialized nations. Criminal activity does not typically target foreigners and is mostly drug-related. Petty crime such as pickpocketing and bag snatching does occur, but is extremely uncommon. During the period of Hajj and Umrah in the holy cities of Mecca and Medina, there have been growing incidents of pickpocketing, especially with women pickpockets becoming an increasing phenomenon. Although incidents of violence are generally considered to be rare, violence has occurred more frequently due to economic pressures on expatriate workers during the last few years. In 2013, the number of crime cases reported by the Ministry of Justice was 22,113, a 102% increase from 2012.

== Background ==
=== Reporting ===
According to the US State Department Overseas Security Advisory Council (OSAC) as of 2014, "U.S. citizens and Westerners continue to report incidents of crime, including robberies and attempted robberies." Cases of sexual assault are believed to be underreported "because victims are customarily blamed". For example, in 2009, a 23-year-old woman was sentenced to a year in prison and 100 lashes for adultery after being raped by five men. In 2007, a 19-year-old victim of rape by seven men receiving a sentence of six months in jail and 200 lashes.

=== History ===
While as late as the 1980s the kingdom boasted of being "practically crime-free," the crime rate among jobless youth grew by 320% from 1990 to 1996. Convictions for drug possession rose from 4,279 in 1986 to 17,199 in 2001. Credited with rising crime are a "population boom, rapid social change, and massive unemployment" leading to "a breakdown in traditional forms of social control and constraint.

== Types of crime ==
=== Domestic violence ===
The lifetime prevalence of domestic violence in Saudi Arabia is estimated to be between 20%-39% for women, depending on the region in which they live. A 2015 study found that 20% of women visiting primary care centers in Riyadh had experienced domestic violence in the past year.

Further, Saudi Arabia has a guardianship system for women. A man, typically a husband or father, is legally responsible for a woman's choices. In addition to greatly limiting women's freedoms, this poses an issue for women who wish to report domestic violence. An estimated 90% of abusers are also women's guardians. Women are often not permitted to use the phone or leave the house without their guardian's permission, making discrete reporting impossible for many in abusive situations.

In 2013, Saudi Arabia made domestic violence illegal for the first time following a viral DV awareness campaign. The bill, called the Law for Protection from Abuse, criminalized physical, psychological, and sexual abuse, as well requiring employees to report any abuse they witness in the workplace. The Ministry of Social Affairs also established the Domestic Violence Protection Programme, as well as a national hotline to report suspected cases of abuse.

It is difficult to ascertain the impact that the law has had on rates of domestic violence. Reports of DV incidents have increased, which is likely a result of increased reporting rather than increased abuse. There are difficulties in enforcing the law, including obstacles posed by the male guardianship system and broad judicial discretion.

=== Theft ===
Petty theft is a problem especially in crowded areas. The nation has strict laws prohibiting drug trafficking; drug trafficking is a capital crime. Despite strict laws, however, illicit trafficking takes place in considerable amounts through underground channels, especially in marijuana, cocaine and homegrown psychedelic drugs. Saudi Arabia is a signatory to all three international conventions on drug control. To curb money laundering, improved anti-money laundering laws have been enacted. The country has implemented all the forty recommendations of the Financial Action Task Force on Money Laundering (FATF) for combating money laundering and all eight recommendations of the FATF regarding terror financing. A Financial Intelligence Unit exists for the purpose of monitoring flows of funds.

The most common crime in 2002 was theft, which accounted for 47% of total reported crime.

=== Terrorism ===
Saudi Arabia has seen many terrorist attacks on its soil. In 1996, Hezbollah Al-Hejaz attacked a building in the oil-industry town of Khobar, killing 19 people. Various Iranian groups have also tried to wreak havoc in Saudi Arabia. From 2000 to 2004, when a number of expatriate workers were killed in car bombings, questions arose over the seriousness and sincerity of Saudi efforts to prevent or investigate attacks. Before May 2003, the only public statements of any investigation or prosecution of attacks were Saudi accusations against the (mainly British) western expatriates themselves. Saudis arrested and detained several, claiming they were 'alcohol traders' fighting a turf war over the illegal distribution of alcohol. According to author Thomas Hegghammer, "today, few outside Saudi Arabia believe that alcohol traders carried out the bombings", as the suspects were well-paid professionals with no prior record of violent crime, no forensic evidence was provided against them, and attacks of a very similar nature on western nationals continued despite the arrests of the alleged perpetrators.

After 26 foreigners were killed in a May 2003 attack by three car bombs on foreign residential compounds in Riyadh, American intelligence sources quoted by The Daily Telegraph, stated the operation "depended on a significant level of `insider` knowledge of the compounds," and this and other evidence indicates that al-Qaeda has infiltrated even the elite National Guard, which was involved in compound security. Bombers wore uniforms of security forces, in both the May 2003 compound bombing and another in November.

In May 2004, militants took dozens of hostages attacking three buildings in Khobar over a 25-hour period killing 22 people and injuring 25 — mainly foreign workers — killing one victim by tying him to the back of a vehicle and dragging him through the street. Despite being surrounded by Saudi security, three of the four gunmen escaped.

While attacks by militants have decreased dramatically since late 2004, there are continued reports of terrorist planning. The Department of Foreign Affairs and Trade (DFAT) of the Government of Australia claimed they received reports that terrorists are masterminding attacks against assets belonging to the Government of Saudi Arabia, oil infrastructure, aviation infrastructure, embassies, hotels, shopping malls and many Western interests such as residential housing complexes, gatherings of foreign tourists for recreational or cultural activities etc. The United States Department of State reported "There is an on-going security threat due to the continued presence of terrorist groups, some affiliated with al Qaida, who may target Western interests, housing compounds, and other facilities where Westerners congregate". Terrorist attacks in the country targeted both native people and foreigners. DFAT further stated "Terrorist attacks could occur at any time, anywhere in Saudi Arabia, including in Riyadh, Khobar, and other major cities".

The kingdom has taken successful efforts to rehabilitate terrorists. Saudi Arabia has the best terrorist rehabilitation program in the world. Their terrorist recidivism rate is about 3 to 4%. In order to have such a low terrorist recidivism rate, the Saudi Arabian's well-designed strategies to counter the effects new terrorist recruits endure during indoctrination to a terrorist organization. The effects that Saudi Arabia terrorist rehabilitation program targets are as follows: authorization, isolation, training, and dehumanization. By knowing these steps, the rehabilitation programs reverse the effects of the terrorist authorization, isolation, dehumanization, and training to become successful in criminal rehabilitation. The rehabilitation programs help violent offenders positively reintegrate in the free society by supporting the creation of positive peer and familial relationships. These programs help to reconnect family with the offender or aid in the creation of a family.

=== Murder ===
In 1988, the reported murder rate in Saudi Arabia was .011 per 100,000 population, sexual offenses were .059 per 100,000 population, and thefts were .005 per 100,000. The UN office of drugs and crime reported that there were 0.83 victims of intentional homicide per 100,000 population in 2019.

=== Religious crimes ===
The Saudi legal system is based on Sharia or Islamic law and thus often prohibits many activities that are not crimes in other nations, such as alcohol or pork consumption, public displays of non-Islamic religious symbols or text, affection between opposite sex outside of marriage, "indecent" artwork or media images, sorcery, homosexuality, cross-dressing, and fornication or adultery. Some Western countries and human rights advocates criticize the Saudi corrections system for the manner in which offenders are punished.

There are three major types of punishments established under Sharia law.

These three are "Hudud" (limit or boundary), "Qisas" "retaliation", and "Tazirat" "discretionary punishments". These punishments "are fixed by the Quran and Sunnah and cannot be altered by any judicial authority".

The first punishment called Hudud (limit or boundary) includes life imprisonment. Despite its potential for harshness, punishment through Hudud is imposed incrementally and under community supervision.

The second punishment called Qisas (retaliation) is reserved for crimes of violence such as murder and assault. Courts do not have an initial sentencing role because Qisas follows an eye-for-an-eye justice of retaliation, meaning that "the offender is punished in the same way, and by the same means, as the crime that she or he committed". Thus, the penalty for murder is death, and the penalty for assault is a beating.

The third punishment is called Tazirat (discretionary punishments) and it depends on the severity of the crime. In this category the King's approval is not required as in the previous categories. So, if a person commits any sin which violates Islamic law, the judge can punish him or her. Practicing Tazirat includes punishments such as "lashing, prison, or banishment, is specified in written form".

People have been punished for criticising religions, especially Islam.

=== Corruption ===
Corruption is widespread in Saudi Arabia, most prevalent in the form of nepotism, the use of middlemen, 'wasta', to do business, as well as patronage systems. The Saudi government and the royal family have often, and over many years, been accused of corruption. In a country that is said to "belong" to the royal family and is named after it, the lines between state assets and the personal wealth of senior princes are blurred. The corruption has been described as systemic and endemic, and its existence was acknowledged and defended by Prince Bandar bin Sultan (a senior member of the royal family) in an interview in 2001.

Although corruption allegations have often been limited to broad undocumented accusations, specific allegations were made in 2007, when it was claimed that the British defence contractor BAE Systems had paid Prince Bandar US$2 billion in bribes relating to the Al-Yamamah arms deal. Prince Bandar denied the allegations. Investigations by both US and UK authorities resulted, in 2010, in plea bargain agreements with the company, by which it paid $447 million in fines but did not admit to bribery. Transparency International in its annual Corruption Perceptions Index for 2010 gave Saudi Arabia a score of 4.4 (on a scale from 0 to 10 where 0 is "highly corrupt" and 10 is "very clean").

During the 2017 Saudi Arabian anti-corruption arrests on 5 November, 11 princes and dozens of former ministers were detained in a new anti-corruption probe in Saudi Arabia. Among those detained include prominent billionaire investor Prince Al-Waleed bin Talal, National Guard Minister Miteb bin Abdullah and Economy and Planning Minister Adel Fakeih. The official line is that the purge was in response to corrupt practices by the accused and that the anti-corruption committee has the right to issue arrest warrants, impose travel restrictions, and freeze bank accounts. It is also empowered to investigate financials and freeze assets until cases are decided on. The Royal proclamation further said, "due to the propensity of some people for abuse, putting their interest above public interest, and stealing public funds."

In 2018, Saudi Arabian journalist Jamal Khashoggi was kidnapped and killed after he criticized the Saudi government.

On 6 March 2020, the Crown Prince of Saudi Arabia, Mohammed bin Salman detained three senior royal members, including King Salman's brother, Prince Ahmed bin Abdulaziz, the former crown prince, Muhammed bin Nayef, and his younger brother, to eliminate the risk of potential successors to the throne.

On 15 March 2020, Saudi Arabia conducted another mass-detention campaign and arrested 298 government employees out of the 674 people investigated on suspicion of corruption. The detainees included current and retired military officers, security officers under the Interior Ministry, health officials, and judges. The mass detention raised human rights concerns; Human Rights Watch called for the revelation of the legal and evidentiary basis for each person's detention.

On 6 August 2020, former top Saudi Intelligence official Saad AlJabri, who self-exiled in Canada, filed a lawsuit against Saudi Arabia's Crown Prince Mohammed bin Salman and other high-ranking officials. The lawsuit was filed at the Washington, D.C. court under the Torture Victim Protection Act, accusing the crown prince of sending a hit squad, dubbed Tiger Squad, in October 2018 for his extrajudicial killing.

In March 2021, more than 240 people were arrested in Saudi Arabia for corruption. Employees from the ministries of interior, health, municipal and rural affairs and housing, education, and human resources and social development, customs and the postal story were arrested.

== See also ==
- Capital punishment in Saudi Arabia
- Legal system of Saudi Arabia
- Censorship in Saudi Arabia
- Prostitution in Saudi Arabia
- Human trafficking in Saudi Arabia

== Sources ==
- Bradley, John R. (2005). Saudi Arabia Exposed: Inside a Kingdom in Crisis. Palgrave. p. 113. ISBN 9781403970770.
