= Discipline =

Self-control

Discipline is the self-control that is gained by requiring that rules or orders be obeyed, and the ability to keep working at something that is difficult. Disciplinarians believe that such self-control is of the utmost importance and enforce a set of rules that aim to develop such behavior. Cultivation and enforcement of discipline includes positive/negative reinforcement, and routine.

== Self-discipline ==
Self-discipline refers to one's ability to control one's behavior and actions to achieve a goal or to maintain a certain standard of conduct. It is the ability to commit to certain tasks regardless of emotions such as boredom and resist things that should be avoided. This includes placing more importance on goals for ones own, or others sake.

An example of self-discipline is the Stanford marshmallow experiment which was a study on delayed gratification. This study involved children being given the choice between one marshmallow now or having to wait 15 minutes and then getting two marshmallows afterwards. Later, a follow-up study found that the children who chose to wait, had an overall better life outcome. Self-discipline is about one's ability to control their desires and impulses to keep themselves focused on what needs to get done to successfully achieve a goal. It is about taking small, consistent steps of daily action to build a strong set of disciplined habits that fulfill your objectives. One trains themselves to follow rules and standards that help determine, coalesce, and line up one's thoughts and actions with the task at hand. Small acts allow one to achieve greater goals. The key component of self-discipline is the trait of perseverance. Daily choices accumulate to produce changes one wants the most, despite obstacles. Self-discipline, determination, and perseverance are similar to grit.

Discipline is about internal and external consistencies. One must decide on what is right from wrong (internal consistency) and adhere to external regulation, which is to have compliance with rules (external consistency). Discipline is used to "expend some effort" to do something one does not feel motivated to do. Discipline is an action that completes, furthers, or solidifies a goal, not merely one's thoughts and feelings. An action conforms to a value. In other words, one allows values to determine one's own choices.

Self-discipline may prevent procrastination. People regret things they have not done compared to things they have done. When one procrastinates, they spend time on things that avoid a goal. Procrastination is not always caused by laziness or relaxation. One can procrastinate due to failure or inability to learn.

=== In religion ===
Self-discipline is an important principle in several religious systems. For example, in Buddhist ethics as outlined in the Noble Eightfold Path, both Right View and Right Mindfulness have been described as a moral discipline.

For some varieties of Christian ethics, virtues directed by the Beatitudes were preceded by ascetical theology and obedience-based discipline. This shift transformed the focus from the Gifts of the Holy Spirit to one of authority, which, though blessed, did not carry the same happiness as that derived from adherence and observances. During the Middle Ages, spirituality and morality were closely intertwined. The Beatitudes gained prominence as an organizational principle after Saint Augustine. However, Christian ethics as a form of discipline did not fully emerge until the Late Middle Ages. Alongside Lutheranism and the post-Enlightenment era, obedience-based discipline coexists. Self-mastery is identified as a learning objective for candidates for ordination based in a Catholic seminary.

According to the Catechism of the Catholic Church, "[t]he object, the intention, and the circumstances make up the three 'sources' of the morality of human acts". The Holy Spirit is essential for comprehending "the eternal Word of the living God, [and] must... open (our) minds to understand the Scriptures."

Self-discipline is how self-control is gained, and the way hope is maintained.

== Child discipline ==
Child discipline is the methods used to prevent future unwanted behaviour in children. The word discipline is defined as imparting knowledge and skill, in other words, to teach. In its most general sense, discipline refers to systematic instruction given to a disciple. To discipline means to instruct a person to follow a particular code of conduct.

Discipline is used by parents to teach their children about expectations, guidelines and principles. Child discipline can involve rewards and punishments to teach self-control, increase desirable behaviors and decrease undesirable behaviors. While the purpose of child discipline is to develop and entrench desirable social habits in children, the ultimate goal is to foster particular judgement and morals so the child develops and maintains self-discipline throughout the rest of their life.

Because the values, beliefs, education, customs and cultures of people vary so widely, along with the age and temperament of the child, methods of child discipline also vary widely. Child discipline is a topic that draws from a wide range of interested fields, such as parenting, the professional practice of behavior analysis, developmental psychology, social work, and various religious perspectives. In recent years, advances in the understanding of attachment parenting have provided a new background of theoretical understanding and advanced clinical and practical understanding of the effectiveness and outcome of parenting methods.

There has been debate in recent years over the use of corporal punishment for children in general, and increased attention to the concept of "positive parenting" where desirable behavior is encouraged and rewarded. The goal of positive discipline is to teach, train and guide children so that they learn, practice self-control and develop the ability to manage their emotions, and make desired choices regarding their personal behavior.

Cultural differences exist among a number of forms of child discipline. Shaming is a form of discipline and behavior modification. Children raised in different cultures experience discipline and shame in various ways. This generally depends on whether the society values individualism or collectivism.

=== Positive discipline ===
Positive discipline is a discipline model used by some schools and in parenting that focuses on the positive points of behavior. It is based on the idea that there are no bad children, just good and bad behaviors. Practitioners of positive discipline believe that good behavior can be taught and reinforced while weaning bad behaviors without hurting the child verbally or physically. People engaging in positive discipline believe that they are not ignoring problems but dealing with the problem differently by helping the child learn how to handle situations more appropriately while remaining kind to the children themselves.

Positive behavior support (PBS) is a structured, open-ended model that many parents and schools follow. It promotes positive decision making, teaching expectations to children early, and encouraging positive behaviors.

Positive discipline is in contrast to negative discipline. Negative discipline may involve angry, destructive, or violent responses to inappropriate behavior. In terms used by psychology research, positive discipline uses the full range of reinforcement and punishment options:

- Positive reinforcement, such as complimenting a good effort;
- Negative reinforcement, such as removing undesired or non-preferred stimuli;
- Positive punishment, such as requiring a child to clean up a mess they made; and
- Negative punishment, such as removing a privilege in response to poor behavior.

However, unlike negative discipline, it does all of these things in a kind, encouraging, and firm manner. The focus of positive discipline is to establish reasonable limits and guide children to take responsibility to stay within these limits, or learn how to remedy the situation when they do not.

== School discipline ==
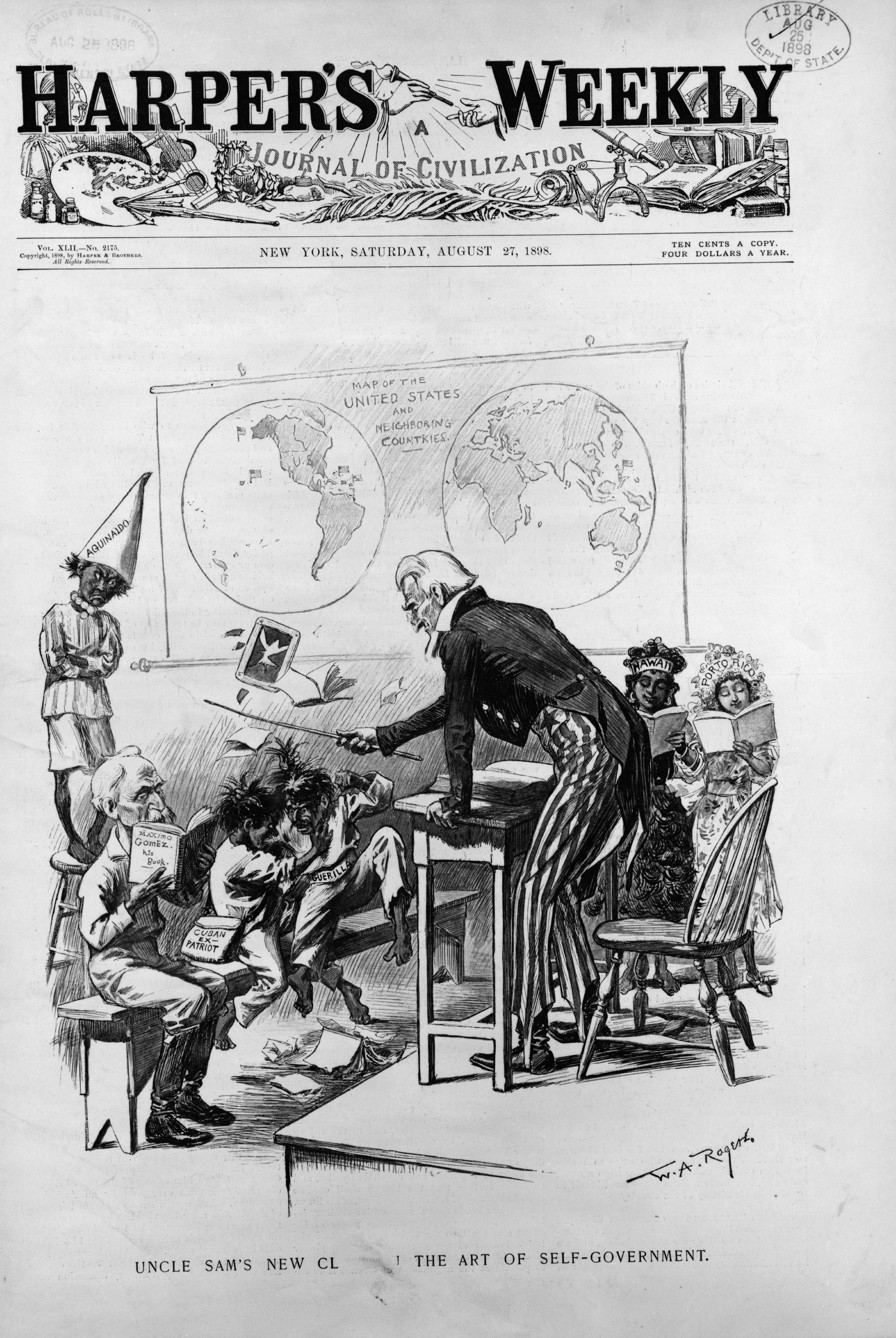
A Harper's Weekly cover from 1898 shows a caricature of school discipline.

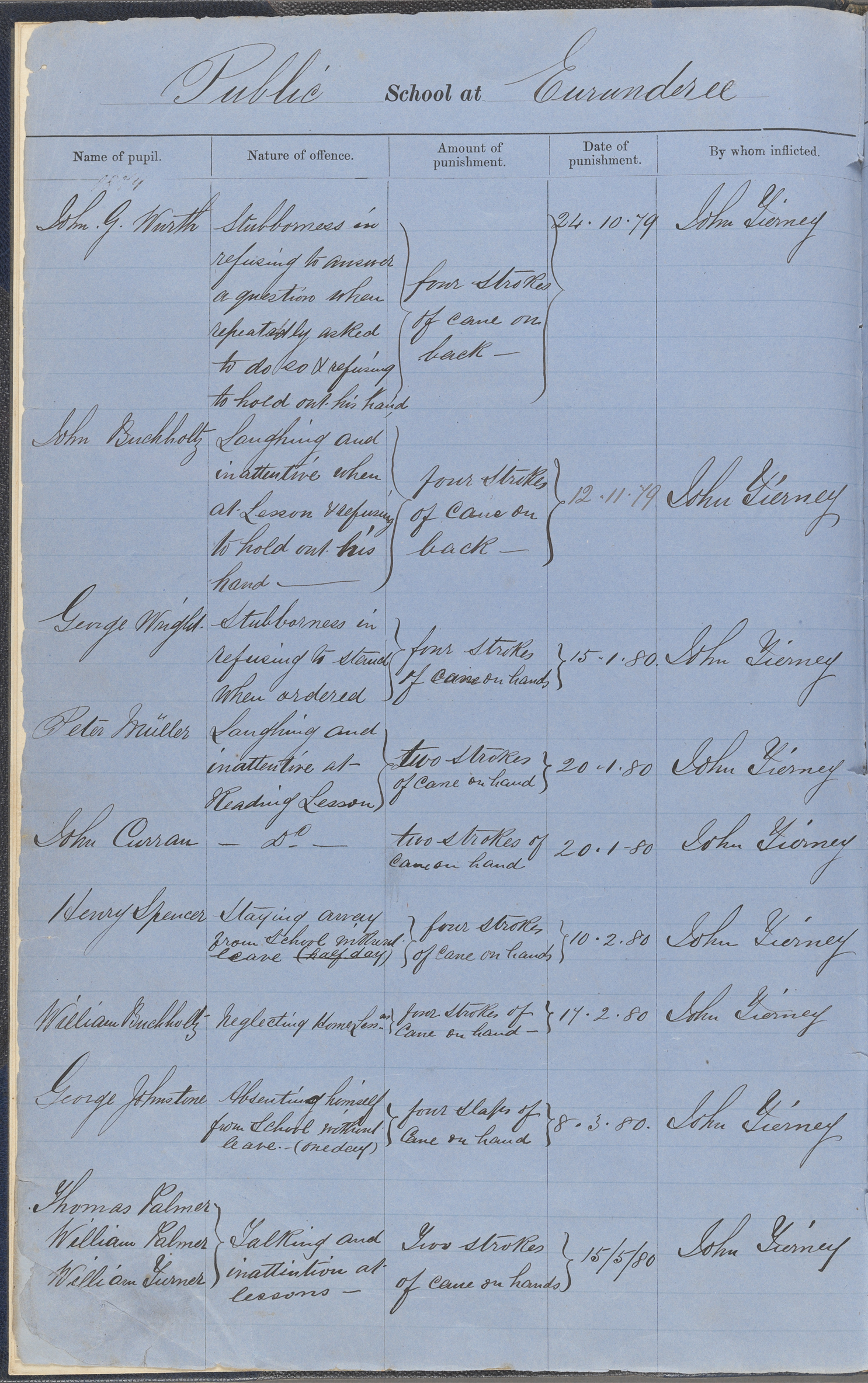
This Punishment Book, from the school attended by Henry Lawson, is one of the earliest surviving examples of this type of record.

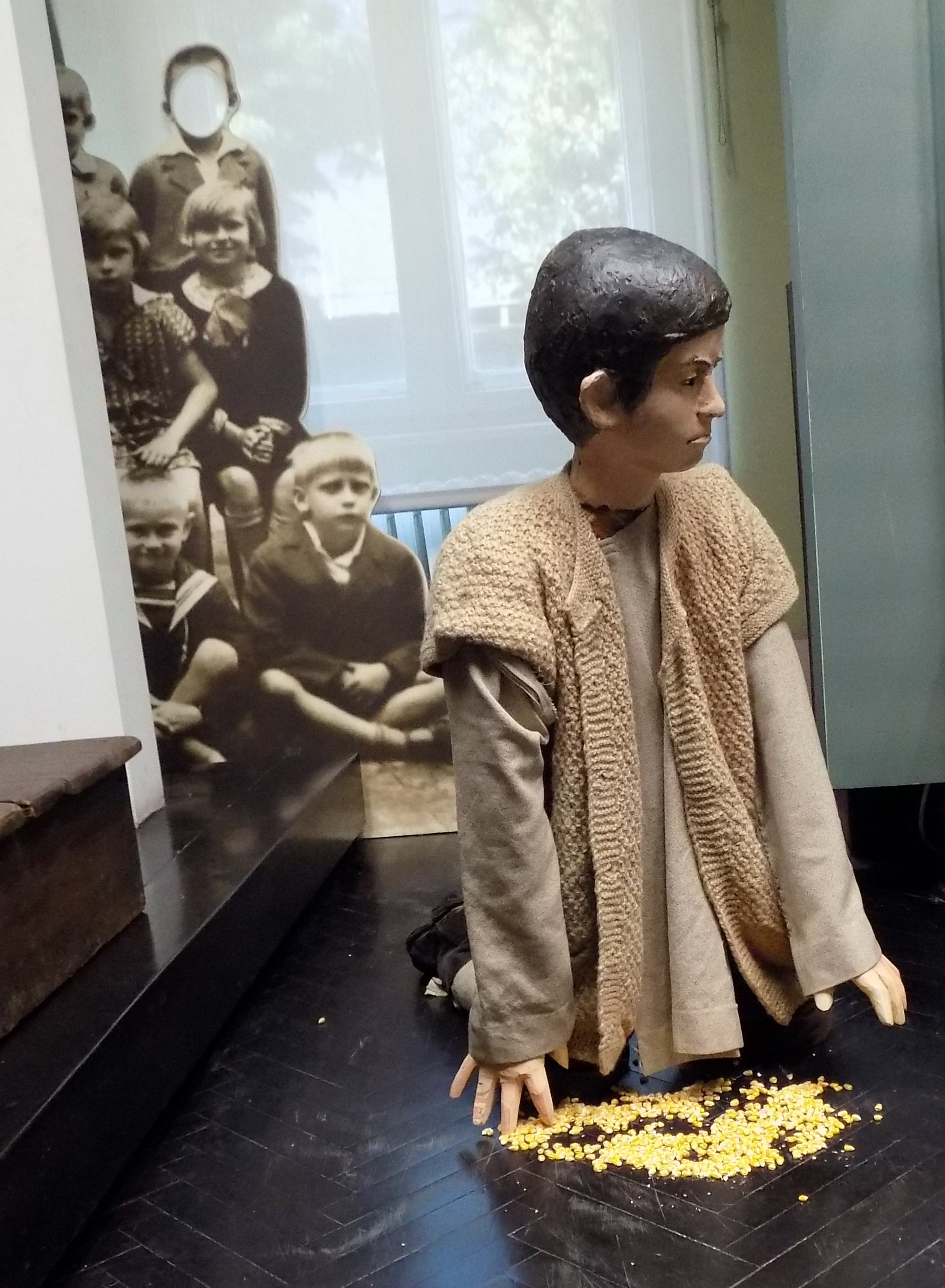
Kneeling on corn - the most common way of punishing students in schools in Serbia in the 19th century, an exhibit of the Pedagogical Museum in Belgrade

School discipline relates to actions taken by teachers or school organizations toward students when their behavior disrupts the ongoing educational activity or breaks a rule created by the school. Discipline can guide the children's behavior or set limits to help them learn to take better care of themselves, other people and the world around them.

School systems set rules, and if students break these rules they are subject to discipline. These rules may, for example, define the expected standards of school uniforms, punctuality, social conduct, and work ethic. The term "discipline" is applied to the action that is the consequence of breaking the rules. The aim of discipline is to set limits restricting certain behaviors or attitudes that are seen as harmful or against school policies, educational norms, school traditions, etc. The focus of discipline is shifting, and alternative approaches are emerging due to notably high dropout rates, disproportionate punishment upon minority students, and other educational inequalities.

== See also ==
- Conformity – Matching opinions and behaviors to group norms
- Deindividuation – Concept in social psychology
- Diligence – Carefulness and persistent effort or work
- Discipline (BDSM) – BDSM practice
- Disinhibition – Lack of restraint
- Domestic discipline (disambiguation)
- Enkrateia (self-control) – Virtuous self-control
- Military discipline – Obedience to a military code of conduct
- Norm (social) – Informal understanding of acceptable conduct
- Obedience – Yielding to instructions from an authority figure
- Rigour – Adhering absolutely to certain constraints with consistency
- Work ethic – Belief in the virtues of labor
