= Prostitution in Saudi Arabia =

Prostitution is illegal in Saudi Arabia, and is punishable by imprisonment and fines. Flogging was also a possible punishment until April 2020 when it was abolished by the order of the Saudi Supreme Court General Commission. Foreign nationals are also deported after punishment. If the parties are also charged with adultery, fornication and sodomy, which can apply to both the prostitute and the client since all sexual activity outside a lawful marriage is illegal, the punishment can be death.

Prostitutes tend to be mostly from Nigeria, Ethiopia, Yemen, Morocco, and Tajikistan.

The Religious Police are responsible for carrying out floggings. Prostitutes may be whipped in public. Some of these have been carried out excessively and deaths have resulted. In June 2007, 80 women were sent to trial for prostitution and 20 men for trafficking or pimping. However, the punishment of flogging was abolished in April 2020, and replaced by fines or jail time. Foreign prostitutes who are arrested by the Saudi vice police face deportation.

Despite being illegal, several episodes showed that the Saudi royal family regularly benefits or covers for members soliciting prostitution. In 2010, the The Guardian published an article based on WikiLeaks, in which United States diplomatic officials stationed in Jeddah described an underground Halloween party "thrown by a wealthy prince of the al-Thunayan family". Liquor and prostitutes were abundant and the identity of the prince was to be kept under secret. In 2025, police arrested more than 50 people running a prostitution ring. Opposition figures had previously accused the government of turning a blind eye to prostitution, making it "quasi-official". Reports show that prostitution is often promoted in social media.

== History ==
Historically, prostitution was connected to slavery in Saudi Arabia. The Islamic Law formally prohibited prostitution. However, since the principle of concubinage in Islam in Islamic Law allowed a man to have sexual intercourse with his female slave, prostitution in the Islamic world was commonly practiced by a pimp selling his female slave on the slave market to a client, who was then allowed to have sex with her as her new owner; the client would then cancel his purchase and return the slave to her pimp on the pretext of discontent, which was a legal and accepted method for prostitution in the Islamic world. Female slaves were used as nurses in Saudi Arabia, a profession which was equated with prostitution. After the abolition of slavery in Saudi Arabia in 1962, former slaves were often forced to rely on prostitution to survive.

== Sex trafficking ==
Saudi Arabia is a destination country for women subjected to forced prostitution. The United States Department of State Office to Monitor and Combat Trafficking in Persons ranks Saudi Arabia as a 'Tier 2 Watch List' country. The classification means the country does not fully meet the minimum standards for elimination of trafficking."

Saudi Arabia is one of the largest consumers of domestic workers. Around 30% of Saudi's population of 27.3 million are immigrants from other countries. The Law requires that all of the expatriates in Saudi Arabia should have an employment contract while they are in the country. But with some unfair work practices such as sexual harassment, extreme working conditions, and other human rights violations, many try to escape their employers. Runaways are often kidnapped and forced into prostitution. E-commerce sites are being used for buying and selling maids online. The Human Rights Foundation has pointed out that foreign workers are often subjected to sex violence, mainly when married to locals.

In 2013, the government did not report any prosecutions or convictions of alleged human traffickers. In 2017, although there were 177 trafficking cases prosecuted, none were for sex trafficking.

== See also ==
- Human trafficking in Saudi Arabia
