= A.H. Mathias Zahniser =

Professor emeritus of Christian mission

A.H. Mathias Zahniser is a professor emeritus of Christian mission at Asbury Theological Seminary and serves as a scholar in residence at Greenville College.

== Selected works ==
- Symbol and Ceremony: Making Disciples across Cultures (1997)
- The Mission and Death of Jesus in Islam and Christianity (2008)
