= Admonition =

Lightest punishment under Scots law

Admonition (or "being admonished") is the lightest punishment under Scots law. It occurs when an offender who has been found guilty or who has pleaded guilty, is not given a fine, but instead receives a lesser penalty in the form of a verbal warning (admonished), due to a minor infringement of the law; the conviction is still recorded. It is usually the result of either the strict application of law where no real wrong has been caused or where other circumstances (e.g. being detained, attending court) make further punishment unjust in the circumstances specific to the case involved.

This disposition is comparable to an absolute discharge in jurisdictions where an absolute discharge involves the recording of a conviction (i.e., where the "discharge" is from punishment only) but stands in contrast to an absolute discharge in jurisdictions in which an absolute discharge does not involve the recording of a conviction as is the case in Scotland under summary procedure (i.e., where the "discharge" is from conviction as well)

Under the Rehabilitation of Offenders Act 1974 there is no disclosure period in respect of admonition and it is considered to be spent immediately.

== Religious admonition ==
In the Reformed churches, admonition was a formal procedure in church discipline for the correction of members of the congregation who had deviated from the doctrine or conduct of the church. In dealing with serial offenders it opened the way to excommunication.
