= Christianity and domestic violence =

Christianity and domestic violence deals with the debate in Christian communities about the recognition and response to domestic violence, which is complicated by a culture of silence and acceptance among abuse victims. There are some Bible verses which abusers use to justify the abuse of their wives. According to the U.S. Conference of Catholic Bishops, abusive men use Ephesians 5:22 as a justification for their abuse, taking out of contexts a passage about the mutual submission of husband and wife.

== Abuse within marriage ==
Christian groups and authorities generally condemn domestic violence as inconsistent with the general Christian duty to love others and to the scriptural relationship between husband and wife.

=== Relationship between husband and wife ===
According to the U.S. Conference of Catholic Bishops, "Men who abuse often use Ephesians 5:22, taken out of context, to justify their behavior, but the passage (v. 21-33) refers to the mutual submission of husband and wife out of love for Christ. Husbands should love their wives as they love their own body, as Christ loves the Church."

Some Christian theologians, such as the Rev. Marie Fortune and Mary Pellauer, have raised the question of a close connection between patriarchal Christianity and domestic violence and abuse. Steven Tracy, author of "Patriarchy and Domestic Violence" writes: "While patriarchy may not be the overarching cause of all abuse, it is an enormously significant factor, because in traditional patriarchy males have a disproportionate share of power... So while patriarchy is not the sole explanation for violence against women, we would expect that male headship would be distorted by insecure, unhealthy men to justify their domination and abuse of women."

Few empirical studies have examined the relationship between religion and domestic violence. According to a 1994 article by Dutton, no single-factor explanation for wife assault was sufficient to explain the available data. (Note: "During the late 1970s a number of single factor explanations for male assaultiveness toward women were proffered. These included sociobiology, psychiatric disorders and patriarchy (Dutton, 1988). Dutton argued that no single factor explanation for wife assault sufficiently explained the available data and proposed instead a nested ecological theory examining interactive effects of the broader culture (macrosystem), the subculture (exosystem), the family (microsystem) and individual characteristics (ontogeny).") A study by Dutton and Browning in the same year found that misogyny is correlated with only a minority of abusive male partners. (Note: "Only a minority of batterers are misogynistic (Dutton and Browning, 1988), and few are violent to non-intimate women; a much larger group experiences extreme anger about intimacy.") Campbell's study in 1992 found no evidence of greater violence towards women in more patriarchal cultures. Pearson's study in 1997 observed, "Studies of male batterers have failed to confirm that these men are more conservative or sexist about marriage than nonviolent men". (Note: "‘Patricia Pearson (p. 132) points out: That men have used a patriarchal vocabulary to account for themselves doesn't mean that patriarchy causes their violence, any more than being patriarchs prevents them from being victimized. Studies of male batterers have failed to confirm that these men are more conservative or sexist about marriage than nonviolent men. To the contrary, some of the highest rates of violence are found in the least orthodox partnerships — dating or cohabiting lovers.")

Responding to Domestic Abuse, a report issued by the Church of England in 2006, suggests that patriarchy should be replaced rather than reinterpreted: "Following the pattern of Christ means that patterns of domination and submission are being transformed in the mutuality of love, faithful care and sharing of burdens. 'Be subject to one another out of reverence for Christ'(Ephesians 5.21). Although strong patriarchal tendencies have persisted in Christianity, the example of Christ carries the seeds of their displacement by a more symmetrical and respectful model of male–female relations."

=== Bible ===
Bible verses are often used to justify domestic abuse, such as those that refer to male superiority and female submission. Others counter that the use of violence is a misinterpreted view of the male role. For instance, Eve (Genesis 2-3), is seen by some Christians to be disobedient to patriarchal God and man, and to many a generalized symbol of womanhood that must be submissive and subject to discipline, while others disagree with this interpretation.

=== Christian domestic discipline ===
A subculture known as Christian domestic discipline (CDD) promotes spanking of wives by their husbands as a form of punishment. While its advocates rely on Biblical interpretations to support the practice, advocates for victims of domestic violence describe it as a form of abuse and controlling behavior. Others describe the practice as a simple sexual fetish and an outlet for sadomasochistic desires. Christian conservative radio host Bryan Fischer said to the Huffington Post that it was a "horrifying trend – bizarre, twisted, unbiblical and un-Christian".

=== Responses to abuse ===
There are a variety of responses by Christian leaders to how victims should handle abuse:

- Marjorie Proctor-Smith in Violence against women and children: a Christian Theological Sourcebook states that domestic physical, psychological or sexual violence is a sin. It victimizes family members dependent on a man and violates trust needed for healthy, equitable and cooperative relationships. She finds that domestic violence is a symptom of sexism, a social sin.
- The U.S. Conference of Catholic Bishops said in 2002, "As pastors of the Catholic Church in the United States, we state as clearly and strongly as we can that violence against women, inside or outside the home, is never justified."
- The Church of England's report, Responding to Domestic Abuse advises that Christian pastors and counselors should not advise victims to make forgiving the perpetrator the top priority "when the welfare and safety of the person being abused are at stake."
- One mid-1980s survey of 5,700 pastors found that 26 percent of pastors ordinarily would tell a woman being abused that she should continue to submit and to "trust that God would honor her action by either stopping the abuse or giving her the strength to endure it" and that 71 percent of pastors would never advise a battered wife to leave her husband or separate because of abuse.

A contributing factor to the disparity of responses to abuse is lack of training; many Christian seminaries had not educated future church leaders about how to manage violence against women. Once pastors began receiving training, and announced their participation in domestic violence educational programs, they immediately began receiving visits from women church members who had been subject to violence. The first Theological Education and Domestic Violence Conference, sponsored by the Center for the Prevention of Sexual and Domestic Violence, was held in 1985 to identify topics that should be covered in seminaries. First, church leaders will encounter sexual and domestic violence and they need to know what community resources are available. Secondly, they need to focus on ending the violence, rather than on keeping families together.

The American religious news-magazine Christianity Today has published articles lamenting U.S. churches for possibly making domestic abuse worse "not in incidence, but in response" due to inadequate understandings. In December 2017, academic W. Bradford Wilcox wrote for the publication, "Domestic violence is still present in church-going homes... some local churches, clergy, and counselors fail to address abuse head-on for fear of breaking up a marriage." He also argued, "Others steer clear of addressing the topic from the pulpit or in adult education for fear of broaching an uncomfortable subject. This silence around domestic violence has to end."

== Research into incidents of domestic violence ==
In the 1970s, when multiple programs were initiated to train church leaders about domestic violence, the response "But no one ever comes to me with this problem" often came up to frustrate efforts. Church leaders frequently believed that if no one reached out for assistance within their congregations that there was no problem for them to deal with; however, women often withheld discussing their problems over concern that it would not be handled appropriately. When women increasingly became pastors over the 20th century, many of them found that much of their time became devoted to handling domestic abuse and other forms of violence against women; "crisis intervention" became a vital topic for them.

In terms of regions of the United States, research has speculated that local societies with a general culture of violence and low socio-economic status, which may also be at least nominally religious, are more likely to produce abusive men. The role of working-class Scots-Irish American culture in areas such as Appalachia is cited.

Differing viewpoints between husband and wife may be an aggravating factor in terms of abuse, particularly when women hold beliefs in contrast to more ideologically hardline men.

== See also ==
- Biblical patriarchy
- Christianity and violence
- Domestic violence
- Domestic violence in the United States
- Domostroy
- International Journal for the Psychology of Religion
- Islam and domestic violence
- Judaism and violence
- Outline of domestic violence
- Violence against women
- Women in Judaism
- Women's rights
