= Miswak =

Twig used to clean teeth

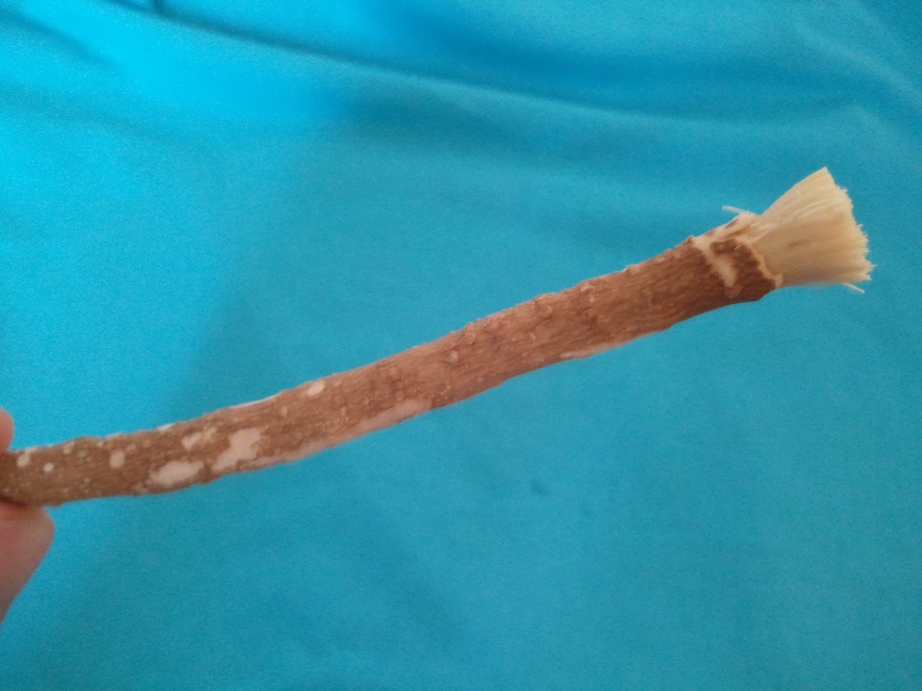
A miswak stick.

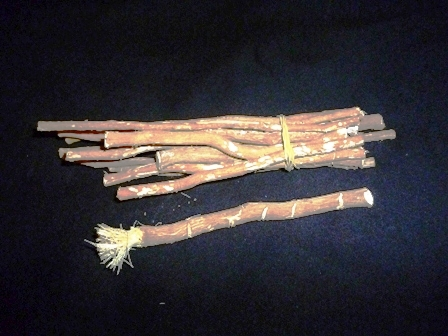
A pack of miswak sticks.

The miswak is a Middle Eastern teeth-cleaning twig made from the Salvadora persica tree. The miswak's properties have been described by the International Dental Journal as follows: "Apart from their antibacterial activity which may help control the formation and activity of dental plaque, they can be used effectively as a natural toothbrush for teeth cleaning. Such sticks are effective, inexpensive, common, available, and contain many medical properties". In use the outer bark is cut or peeled away, revealing inner fibers that act as bristles. The same stick may be trimmed and peeled multiple times to create fresh brushing surfaces.

== Denominations ==
The wooden stick sourced from the miswak tree is called miswak, siwak or arak in Arabic, Salvadora persica in Spanish, misvak in Turkish and Persian, koyoji in Japanese, qesam or qesem in Hebrew, qisa in Aramaic, mastic in Latin, sotio or sothiou in Wolof of Senegal, siwahewal (plural siwakejé) in Northern Nigeria Fulani.

The term miswak should not be confused with the same term used in Maghreb which in Maghrebi Arabic also refers to a completely different instrument made from walnut wood (Juglans regia L., common walnut), both a toothbrush and a toothpick, also used to clean teeth and gums in Morocco, Algeria, Tunisia, and Libya.

== History ==
As far back as antiquity, people began to practice oral hygiene by using fibrous chewable sticks, such as siwak, as toothbrushes. The stick contains cleaning and disinfecting agents. It comes recommended across some medicinal literature; the Islamic Prophet Muhammad is said to have used it regularly, according to the Hadîth.

== Science ==
The World Health Organization (WHO) recommended the use of the miswak in 1986, but in 2000, an international consensus report on oral hygiene concluded that further research was needed to document its effects. A following small-scale study concluded "that the periodontal status of miswak users in this Sudanese population [of 203 subjects] is better than that of toothbrush users". Yet another comparative study conducted on 480 Saudi Arabian adults found that "the level of need for periodontal care in the sample chosen is low when compared with the findings of similar studies undertaken in other countries. The frequent use of the 'Miswak' was associated with a lower need for treatment".

=== Miswak extract vs. oral disinfectants ===
Studies indicate that Salvadora persica extract exhibits low antimicrobial activity compared to other oral disinfectants and anti-plaque agents like triclosan and chlorhexidine gluconate.

Mouthrinses containing chlorhexidine was with maximum antibacterial activity, while cetylpyridinium chloride mouthrinses were with moderate and miswak extract was with low antibacterial activity.

However, the benefits of triclosan were discounted by the United States Food and Drug Administration in 2016 and its safety is uncertain as a hygiene product ingredient. Chlorhexidine gluconate was also linked to serious allergic reactions, albeit rarely.

=== Chemical composition ===
Salvadorine and benzylisothiocyanate appear to be responsible for the antibacterial activity of Miswak. The plant also contains insoluble fluoride in high concentration, calcium, salicylic acid, and some antioxidants of unclear function.

== Religious prescriptions ==
The use of the miswak is frequently advocated in the hadith (the traditions relating to the life of Prophet Muhammad). Situations where the miswak is recommended to be used include before or during wudu (ablution), before going to the mosque, before entering one's house, before and after going on a journey, on Fridays, before sleeping and after waking up, when experiencing hunger or thirst and before entering any good gathering.

In addition to strengthening the gums, preventing tooth decay and eliminating toothaches, the miswak is said to halt further decay that has already set in. Furthermore, it is reputed to create a fragrance in the mouth, eliminate bad breath, improve sensitivity of taste-buds and promote cleaner teeth.

=== Hadiths concerning the miswak ===
It is often mentioned that the Islamic prophet Muhammad recommended the miswak's use. He is quoted in various hadith extolling its virtues:

Were it not that I might over-burden the Believers I would have ordered them to use Siwak (Miswak) at the time of every Prayer.

Four things are from among the practices of the Prophets: Circumcision, Perfume, Miswak, and Marriage.

Make a regular practice of Miswak for verily it is the purification for the mouth and a means of the pleasure of the Lord.

Use the Miswaak, for verily, it purifies the mouth, and it is a Pleasure for the Lord. Jib-ra-eel (A.S.) exhorted me so much to use the Miswaak that I feared that its use would be decreed obligatory upon me and upon my Ummah. If I did not fear imposing hardship on my Ummah I would have made its use obligatory upon my people. Verily, I use the Miswaak so much that I fear the front part of my mouth being peeled (by constant and abundant brushing with the Miswaak)

== Alternative forms ==
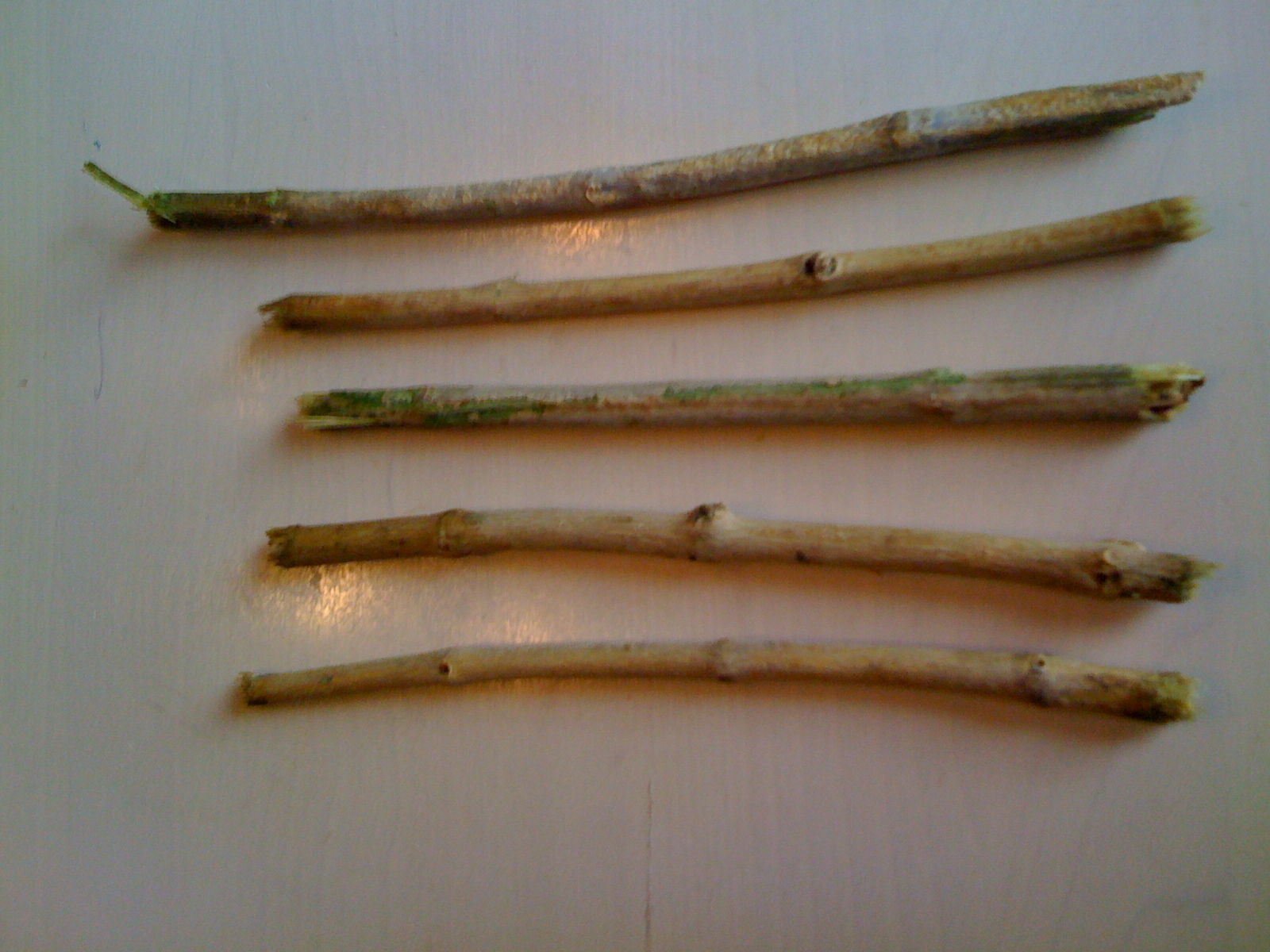
Traditional miswak sticks. Softened bristles on either end can be used to clean the teeth.

Modern uses of arāk wood in oral hygiene expands beyond miswak itself. Extracts containing its active components have been added to mouthwash and toothpaste. There is also a German patent for similar formulations for domesticated animals.
