= Corporal punishment of children in the United States =

Infliction of pain or discomfort on children as punishment

Corporal punishment prohibited in public schools Corporal punishment not prohibited at all (Note: Although not prohibited by state law, no public school in Arizona, Kentucky, North Carolina or Wyoming currently practices corporal punishment on its pupils.)

Corporal punishment of children in the United States, meaning the infliction of physical pain or discomfort by parents or other adult guardians, including in some cases school officials, for purposes of punishing unacceptable attitude, is subject to varying legal limits, depending on the state. Children in the United States commonly experience some form of corporal punishment, such as spanking or paddling. as of 2024, the spanking of children is legal in all 50 states. Corporal punishment is in the United States usually considered distinct from illegal child abuse, although the distinction can often be vague.

== Prevalence ==
Corporal punishment is most frequent for toddler-age children and continues into children's adolescence. More than a third of parents in the US report using corporal punishment on children less than a year old, often with a slap on the hand. Researchers estimate that 85% of American youth have been physically punished by parents during childhood or adolescence. The most common form of physical punishment is spanking on the buttocks with an open hand. However, more than one in four parents have also reported using an object, such as a hairbrush or wooden spoon, to hit their children, according to a 1995 survey. According to Elizabeth Gershoff, these data, combined with the common use of wooden paddles to administer corporal punishment in schools, demonstrate "a prevailing acceptance of objects to deliver punishment".

Race, gender, and social class appear to be significant factors in U.S. domestic corporal punishment patterns. Boys are more likely than girls to be spanked at home, and corporal punishment of boys tends to be more severe and more aggressive than that of girls. Murray Straus suggests that corporal punishment is more harmful for boys than girls. While African-American parents are more likely to favor using corporal punishment, research has shown mixed results on whether physical punishment predicts adverse outcomes in this group. Affluent families at the upper end of the socioeconomic scale tend to spank the least often; middle-class parents tend to administer corporal punishment in greater numbers, and lower-class parents tend to do so with still greater frequency.

A 2014 real-time investigation of mothers in Texas found that nearly half used some form of corporal punishment during the duration of the study. Subjects tended to use spanking when angry and for trivial misdeeds, such as minor social transgressions by children. Those mothers who spanked tended to rely on spanking as a punishment rather than using it as a "last resort". These episodes of corporal punishment were not usually effective in stopping the unwanted behaviour. According to the study's lead author, George Holden, "The recordings show that most parents responded either impulsively or emotionally, rather than being intentional with their discipline", contrary to the advice of spanking advocates. The audio recordings used in the study revealed that mothers tended to spank their children, of varying ages, an average of eighteen times per week. Researchers had earlier estimated that American parents used corporal punishment an average of eighteen times per year. Based on these preliminary results, Holden suggests that studies using self-reports may dramatically underestimate the actual incidence of spanking by parents.

== Social acceptance ==
Public support for parents' right to spank remains high in the U.S. despite a growing body of evidence linking corporal punishment by parents with numerous adverse effects such as aggression, antisocial behavior, anxiety, and depression in children. While support for corporal punishment among American adults has gradually declined since the 1960s, the practice remains more accepted than in European countries. Murray Straus at the University of New Hampshire argues that the decline in public support for corporal punishment since the 1960s is largely a result of the shift from an industrial to a post-industrial economic system. According to the 2004 General Social Survey, approximately 71 percent of American adults agreed with the statement that children sometimes need a "good, hard spanking", down from 84 percent in 1986. Through 2010 and 2012, that number held steady at approximately 70 percent. By 2022–2024, that figure had declined to approximately 55 percent.

== Alternatives ==
The American Academy of Pediatrics, the American Association of Child and Adolescent Psychiatry, and the National Mental Health Association suggest non-violent discipline as an alternative to corporal punishment. Techniques include: Rewarding good behavior, allowing natural consequences to instruct the child (along with explanations when necessary), disciplinary consequences that are tied to the aberrant behaviour (such as taking away toys when the child doesn't pick them up), and time-outs.

The American Academy of Pediatrics discourages corporal punishment because the nonphysical discipline techniques work better and avoid the negative consequences of physical punishment, including: Making children more aggressive or more violent, potentially causing physical harm to them, and teaching them that it's acceptable to physically hurt a loved one.

Professionals say the key to discipline include: communication, respect, consistency, moving on after the punishment is complete, matching discipline to the age of the child, and learning how to recognize when there may be some external factor driving a behaviour (such as being hungry or being bullied at school).

== In law ==
In the majority of states, physical punishment by a parent remains (controversially) legal under statutes making exceptions to the state's law on the crimes of assault, criminal battery, domestic violence, sexual assault, sexual abuse or child abuse. These exceptions usually establish that no crime has been committed when certain actions are applied to a child by that child's parent or legal caregiver. However, the line between permitted corporal punishment and punishment legally defined as abuse varies by state and is not always clear (laws typically allow "reasonable force" and "non-excessive corporal punishment"). Such language is often vague and defined outside of statutory law by the courts via common law, and is necessarily subjective and fact-driven, so that most cases present a fact issue for trial as to reasonableness or non-excessiveness. Examples of law permitting bodily punishment of children include two different articles of the Minnesota Legislature allow parents and teachers to use corporal punishment as a form of discipline by creating explicit exceptions to the state's child abuse statutes for "reasonable and moderate physical discipline." Application of exceptions for physical punishment raise legal issues as well. In 2008, the Minnesota Supreme Court considered a case involving a man who had struck his 12-year-old son 36 blows with a maple paddle. The trial court held that this constituted abuse, but was reversed on appeal. In affirming the reversal, the Minnesota Supreme Court stated that "We are unwilling to establish a bright-line rule that the infliction of any pain constitutes either physical injury or physical abuse, because to do so would effectively prohibit all corporal punishment of children by their parents" and "it is clear to us that the Legislature did not intend to ban corporal punishment".

Administrative actions for the protection of the child may be initiated by child protection workers who become aware of corporal punishment that may endanger a child. The protection of such administrative actions is typically provided in the form of health department regulations, including Child Protective Services (CPS) rules or rules on mandated reporting. Mandatory reporting laws require that persons witnessing certain visible injuries along with reports by a child of abuse to make report to the local CPS or equivalent agency charged with the protection of the child. Such agencies operate on definitions of child abuse provided by the state's health department (which are often very different from the exceptions provided in the criminal code). Child protection agencies typically have the duty and authority to investigate cases with their own agents, such as social workers. If the agency determines abuse has occurred, some administrative actions can be taken immediately without the involvement of the police or the courts. These can include warning the parent, referring the parent to counseling, flagging the parent's name in the agency database, or, in egregious cases, even immediate removal of the child or children from the parent's home.

The United Nations Human Rights Committee has noted its concern with the use of corporal punishment of children in settings including schools, penal institutions, homes, and "all forms of childcare at federal, state, and local levels". It recommended in April 2014 that the government take steps to eliminate corporal punishment in all settings, including through legislation, encouragement of non-violent forms of discipline, and informing the public about the harmful effects of corporal punishment. During the second Universal Periodic Review of human-rights practices in the United States, the report of the United Nations Human Rights Council also contained a recommendation to "Prohibit corporal punishment of children in all settings, including the home and schools, and ensure that the United States encourages non-violent forms of discipline as alternatives to corporal punishment". The US government accepted only the part of the recommendation concerning promotion of nonviolent discipline.

Bans on the corporal punishment of children have been proposed in Massachusetts and California but have failed to secure passage.

== In schools ==
Regulation of corporal punishment in public and private schools is done at the state level. There is no federal policy regarding corporal punishment in schools. In 1977, the Supreme Court of the United States found that the Eighth Amendment clause prohibiting "cruel and unusual punishments" did not apply to school students, and that teachers could punish children without parental permission.

In the US, as of 2024, corporal punishment even at school has been banned only in some states. As of 2024, 33 states and the District of Columbia have banned corporal punishment in public schools, though in some of these there is no explicit prohibition. Corporal punishment is also unlawful in private schools in Illinois, Iowa, Maryland, New Jersey and New York. In the remaining 17 U.S. states corporal punishment is lawful in both public and private schools.

== See also ==
- Child abuse
- Child discipline
- Corporal punishment in the home
- School corporal punishment
- Ingraham v. Wright
