= Corporal punishment in the United States =

Corporal punishment in the United States may refer to:

- Corporal punishment of minors in the United States
- School corporal punishment in the United States
- Judicial corporal punishment in the United States
