= Positive discipline =

Parenting discipline model

Positive discipline is a discipline model used by some schools and in parenting that focuses on the positive points of behavior. It is based on the idea that there are no bad children, just good and bad behaviors. Practitioners of positive discipline believe that good behavior can be taught and reinforced while weaning bad behaviors without hurting the child verbally or physically. People engaging in positive discipline believe that they are not ignoring problems but dealing with the problem differently by helping the child learn how to handle situations more appropriately while remaining kind to the children themselves.

Positive behavior support (PBS) is a structured, open-ended model that many parents and schools follow. It promotes positive decision making, teaching expectations to children early, and encouraging positive behaviors.

Positive discipline is in contrast to negative discipline. Negative discipline may involve angry, destructive, or violent responses to inappropriate behavior. In terms used by psychology research, positive discipline uses the full range of reinforcement and punishment options:

- Positive reinforcement, such as complimenting a good effort;
- Negative reinforcement, such as removing undesired or non-preferred stimuli;
- Positive punishment, such as requiring a child to clean up a mess they made; and
- Negative punishment, such as removing a privilege in response to poor behavior.

However, unlike negative discipline, it does all of these things in a kind, encouraging, and firm manner. The focus of positive discipline is to establish reasonable limits and guide children to take responsibility to stay within these limits, or learn how to remedy the situation when they do not.

== History ==
The Positive Discipline Parenting and Classroom Management Model is based on the work of Alfred Adler and Rudolf Dreikurs. Adler first introduced the idea of parenting education to United States audiences in the 1920s. He advocated treating children respectfully, but also argued that spoiling and pampering children was not encouraging to them and resulted in social and behavioral problems. The classroom techniques, which were initially introduced in Vienna in the early 1920s, were brought to the United States by Dreikurs in the late 1930s. Dreikurs and Adler referred to their approach to teaching and parenting as "democratic".

Many other authors have carried on the parenting and classroom work of Alfred Adler. Jane Nelsen wrote and self-published Positive Discipline in 1981. In 1987 Positive Discipline was picked up by Ballantine, now a subsidiary of Random House. The latest edition was published by Ballantine in 2006, which includes four of the five criteria for Positive Discipline listed below. Nelsen has since added the fifth criteria. Nelsen also co-authored a series of Positive Discipline books with Lynn Lott: Positive Discipline for Teenagers, Positive Discipline A-Z and Positive Discipline in the Classroom (with H. Stephen Glenn). Positive Discipline the First Three Years and Positive Discipline for Preschoolers were co-authored by Jane Nelsen, Cheryl Erwin, and Roslyn Duffy. Cheryl Erwin co-authored with Jane Nelsen Positive Discipline for Single Parents and Positive Discipline for Stepfamilies.

=== Parenting style ===
Nelsen describes four basic parenting styles modified from Diana Baumrind's parenting style.

Short-term Parenting	Long-term parenting
Controlling/Punitive/Rewarding; Permissive/Overprotective/Rescuing; Neglectful/Giving up on being a parent	Kind and Firm

Positive discipline is used to teach long-term parenting—the kind and firm parenting style.

== Five criteria ==
There are 5 criteria for effective positive discipline:

1. Helps children feel a sense of connection. (Belonging and significance)
2. Is mutually respectful and encouraging. (Kind and firm at the same time.)
3. Is effective long-term. (Considers what the children are thinking, feeling, learning, and deciding about themselves and their world – and what to do in the future to survive or to thrive.)
4. Teaches important social and life skills. (Respect, concern for others, problem solving, and cooperation as well as the skills to contribute to the home, school or larger community.)
5. Invites children to discover how capable they are. (Encourages the constructive use of personal power and autonomy.)

Positive Discipline is distinct from positive behavior support (PBS) which is a form of child discipline often used by schools and community agencies to promote successful behavior, as PBS includes some behavioristic elements such as positive reinforcement. PBS focuses on "measuring" behaviors, replacement behaviors, a reduction of crisis intervention, and teaching strategies for self-control.

== Main techniques ==
=== Creating rules ===
In her book entitled Positive Discipline, Jane Nelsen emphasizes the importance of not only creating clear rules, but of making them fair. Any rule should be followed by the parent or teacher (as much as possible), as well as by the child. An example she gave was that of having a "black hole box" where any items left out of place around the house would be deposited for the length of one week. This applied to the belongings of the children as well as of the parents. Furthermore, the rules should be devised by the children with some direction from the authority figure, and be agreed upon in a group meeting situation where everyone has equal power and input. This makes the children responsible for following the rules which they themselves created. When consequences are necessary, they should be delivered in a kind but firm manner, preserving the trust and mutual respect between the adult and the child.

=== Inspiring intrinsic motivation ===
The idea of doing away with both positive and negative reinforcement as much as possible is suggested as a way to inspire intrinsic motivation. Intrinsic motivation is the motivation drawn from internal sources, out of a sense of ethics or a desire to feel good about oneself. This is in contrast with extrinsic motivation, wherein motivation stems from a desire to avoid punishment or attain a reward. This is what Positive Discipline seeks to avoid, so that children learn to act correctly even when there will be no external reward or punishment for behavior.

=== Recognizing needs ===
In Positive Discipline theory, it is posited that when children misbehave they are displaying that a need of theirs is not being met. Children have different developmental abilities depending on their age - see Maslow's hierarchy of needs. In dealing with the misbehavior, it is suggested that focusing on the unmet need rather than the behavior itself will have better results.

=== Understand the meaning ===
Naomi Aldort, author of Raising Our Children, Raising Ourselves, explains that inappropriate behavior can be a child's way of getting attention. They do not act out without a valid reason, as they try to do the best that they can. Once there is an understanding behind the behavior, the cause can be removed and no further emotional outbursts will come from the child.

=== Redirect negative behavior ===
A child who hears the word "No" all the time will eventually start to ignore its meaning. Katharine C. Kersey, the author of The 101s: A Guide to Positive Discipline, recommends encouraging positive behavior to replace misbehavior. Parents should be encouraged to redirect the child's behavior into something positive, for example, if a child is acting out in a supermarket, the child should be redirected into something creative or helpful such as picking out a type of fruit to buy instead of acting out.

=== Conscious discipline ===
Conscious discipline focuses on "developing discipline within children rather than applying discipline to them. The whole discipline process applies to everyone involved. Imagine a pyramid where four parts represent four stages of the discipline:

1. At the base of a pyramid is understanding the brain states,
2. After that comes learning your seven adult powers,
3. Think of the ways how you can connect members of the family and the classroom,
4. The last stage is to use the seven skills you learned to respond to situations in new ways.

Conscious discipline works with the awareness of our behavior to certain situations and encourages us to learn how to consciously manage our behavior so we can help the child to do the same. The Conscious Discipline Brain State Model has three states: Survival State (Am I safe?), Emotional State (Am I loved?), and Executive State (What can I learn from this?).

== Preventive measures ==
Part of using positive discipline is preventing situations in which negative behaviors can arise. There are different techniques that teachers can use to prevent bad behaviors:

One technique is to see students who "misbehave" as actually demonstrating "mistaken" behavior. There are many reasons why a student may exhibit mistaken behavior, i.e. lack of knowing appropriate behavior to feeling unwanted or unaccepted. For students who simply do not know what appropriate behavior they should be exhibiting, the teacher can teach the appropriate behavior. For example, a child who is fighting over a toy in a dramatic way should be approached by a teacher who should try and create a fair solution by encouraging the child's input and talking about their problems to avoid another argument. For students who are feeling unwanted or unaccepted, a positive relationship needs to develop between the teacher and student before any form of discipline will work.

Sanctions would be less needed if students have a strong connection with the adult in charge and knew that the teacher respected them. Teachers need to know how to build these relationships. Simply telling them to demonstrate respect and connection with students is not enough for some of them, because they may also lack knowledge on how to do this.

Teachers need to view each child as an account; they must deposit positive experiences in the student before they make a withdraw from the child when discipline takes place. Teachers can make deposits through praise, special activities, fun classroom jobs, smiles and appropriate pats on the backs. Some children have never experienced positive attention. Children long for attention; if they are not receiving positive attention they will exhibit behavior that will elicit negative attention.

Teachers can recognize groups of students who would not work well together (because they are friends or do not get along well) and have them separated from the start to prevent situations which will result in negative behavior. Some teachers employ the "boy-girl-boy-girl" method of lining or circling up (which may be sexist or effective, depending on your perspective) in order to keep friend groups separate and to encourage the students to make new friends. The physical arrangement of the classroom can affect classroom discipline and the effectiveness of instruction.

Another technique would be to be explicit with the rules, and consequences for breaking those rules, from the start. If students have a clear understanding of the rules, they will be more compliant when there are consequences for their behaviors later on. A series of 3 warnings is sometimes used before a harsher consequence is used (detention, time-out, etc.), especially for smaller annoyances (for example, a student can get warnings for calling out, rather than getting an immediate detention, because a warning is usually effective enough). Harsher consequences should come without warnings for more egregious behaviors (hitting another student, cursing, deliberately disobeying a warning, etc.). Teachers can feel justified that they have not "pulled a fast one" on students.

Students are more likely to follow the rules and expectations when they are clearly defined and defined early. Many students need to know and understand what the negative behaviors are before they end up doing one by accident.

Involving the students when making the rules and discipline plans may help prevent some students from acting out. It teaches the students responsibility and creates an awareness of what good versus bad behaviors are. It also makes the student feel obligated and motivated to follow the rules because they were involved while they were created.

== Evidence ==
Studies of implementation of Positive Discipline techniques have shown that Positive Discipline tools do produce significant results. Research has proven that schools with a high suspension rate do not have successful academic outcomes. A study of school-wide implementation of classroom meetings in a lower-income Sacramento, CA elementary school over a four-year period showed that suspensions decreased (from 64 annually to 4 annually), vandalism decreased (from 24 episodes to 2) and teachers reported improvement in classroom atmosphere, behavior, attitudes and academic performance. (Platt, 1979) A study of parent and teacher education programs directed at parents and teachers of students with "maladaptive" behavior that implemented Positive Discipline tools showed a statistically significant improvement in the behavior of students in the program schools when compared to control schools. (Nelsen, 1979) Smaller studies examining the effects of specific Positive Discipline tools have also shown positive results. (Browning, 2000; Potter, 1999; Esquivel) Studies have repeatedly demonstrated that a student's perception of being part of the school community (being "connected" to school) decreases the incidence of socially risky behavior (such as emotional distress and suicidal thoughts / attempts, cigarette, alcohol and marijuana use; violent behavior) and increases academic performance. (Resnick et al., 1997; Battistich, 1999; Goodenow, 1993) There is also significant evidence that teaching younger students social skills has a protective effect that lasts into adolescence. Students that have been taught social skills are more likely to succeed in school and less likely to engage in problem behaviors. (Kellam et al., 1998; Battistich, 1999)

Programs similar to Positive Discipline have been studied and shown to be effective in changing parent behavior. In a study of Adlerian parent education classes for parents of teens, Stanley (1978) found that parents did more problem solving with their teens and were less autocratic in decision making. Positive Discipline teaches parents the skills to be both kind and firm at the same time. Numerous studies show that teens who perceive their parents as both kind (responsive) and firm (demanding) are at lower risk for smoking, use of marijuana, use of alcohol, or being violent, and have a later onset of sexual activity. (Aquilino, 2001; Baumrind, 1991; Jackson et al., 1998; Simons, Morton et al., 2001) Other studies have correlated the teen's perception of parenting style (kind and firm versus autocratic or permissive) with improved academic performance. (Cohen, 1997; Deslandes, 1997; Dornbusch et al., 1987; Lam, 1997)

Studies have shown that through the use of positive intervention programs "designed specifically to address the personal and social factors that place some high school students at risk of drug abuse, schools can reduce these young people's drug use and other unhealthy behaviors" (Eggert, 1995; Nicholas, 1995; Owen, 1995). Use of such programs has shown improvement in academics and a decline in drug use across the board.

=== Studies ===
Studies have shown that "kids who are at high risk of dropping out of school and abusing drugs are more isolated and depressed and have more problems with anger", says Dr. Leona Eggert of the University of Washington in Seattle. "They are disconnected from school and family and are loosely connected with negative peers" (Eggert, 1995; Nicholas, 1995; Owen, 1995).

Overall implementing positive programs to deal with Positive Discipline will better the decision-making process of teens and parents, according to some researchers.

Quail and Ward conducted a systematic overview of research which supports non-violent child discipline options. They found many techniques are supported by research findings. Techniques include time-in, appropriately used time-out, modeling, monitoring, feedback, appropriate praise, goal setting, promoting self-management, and promoting problem-solving skills. When combined with warm and open communication, non-violent discipline tools are effective to address a child's resistance, lack of cooperation, problem behavior, emotional dysregulation, and to teach appropriate behavior. Additional benefits include improved school engagement and academic achievement, improved self-esteem and independence, better self-regulation, and lower rates of depression, suicide, substance abuse, sexual risk behavior, conduct disorders, aggression, and crime.

== See also ==
- School discipline
- Child discipline
- Attachment parenting
