= Washing out the mouth with soap =

Form of physical punishment

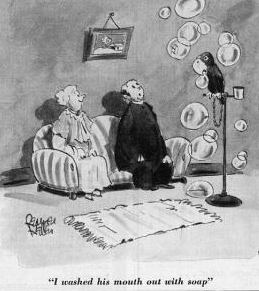
1937 cartoon in Boys' Life

Washing out the mouth with soap is a traditional form of physical punishment that consists of placing soap, or a similar cleansing agent, inside a person's mouth so that the person will taste it, inducing what is generally considered an unpleasant experience. This form of punishment was especially common in the United States and United Kingdom from the late 19th century until the mid-20th century.

Washing out the mouth with soap is most often used as a response to profanity, lying, biting, tobacco use, or verbal disrespect. It is intended to function both as a symbolic "cleansing" following the infraction and as a deterrent, due to the foul aftertaste. It is commonly used as child discipline or school discipline, and is reported to be more frequently employed by mothers than fathers.

The use of this punishment has diminished considerably since the mid-20th century, largely in favour of discipline methods that are not considered violent or humiliating. Nonetheless, this punishment still has advocates. Ingestion of soaps and detergents can have potentially serious health consequences, and individuals administering this form of punishment may face legal sanctions.

== History ==
A friend of mine was horrified one day by hearing her little boy make use of a very bad word [...] Turning to the maid she said, "Jane, you may take Master Dick up stairs and wash his mouth out with soap and water. It is too soiled for him to sit at the table with us..."

— Good Housekeeping, 1889

One of the earliest recorded uses of forcing another to ingest soap as punishment appeared in the 1832 Legal Examiner, where it was noted that a married couple "were constantly quarrelling; and that one evening, on the man's return home, he found his wife intoxicated, [...] perceiving a piece of kitchen soap lying on the ground near the spot, he crammed it into his wife's mouth, saying, "She has had plenty of water to wash with, she ought now to have a little soap".

In the 1860s, the periodical Aunt Judy's Annual Volume featured the main characters forced to eat a bar of soap as punishment for constantly failing to wash up, as the climax to a story entitled "Scaramouches at School".

In 1872, The Chinese Recorder and Missionary Journal mentioned that an American colleague recommended the practice of washing out the mouth of a child heard to swear to colleagues in the Orient.

In 1873, a schoolmistress in Mahaska, Iowa punished a boy in her class for indulging in chewing tobacco by washing his mouth out with soap. Much later examples tell how Filipino or Lakota individuals were punished for speaking their native language with a similar punishment.

An 1898 "study in moral education", published by the Journal of Genetic Psychology, noted that whipping, withdrawal of privileges, lectures, being sent alone to a room and washing out a subject's mouth with either soap, salt or pepper, were the most likely punishments to deter future abuses. Two years later, a New York State Department of Social Welfare officer submitted a complaint against the Rochester Orphan Asylum noting that "I find, as charged, that children's mouths have been washed with soap-suds, but not, as also charged, with ashes and water; that such punishments were ordered for obscene or profane language". By the start of the 20th century, the practice was also noted at the Maryland State Reformatory for Women as punishment for any infraction of the rules.

In the 1940s, washing out the mouth with soap was a hazing ritual in the British Royal Navy.

In the 1950s, several American school boards ruled in favour of washing out a pupil's mouth with soap as a legitimate punishment.

In 1953, Wisconsin judge Harvey L. Neelan fined a Miss Mertz $25 for her drunken obscenities and noted that she should be required to wash her mouth with soap. In 1963, Michigan judge Francis Castellucci ordered Louis Winiarski, who had been found using obscene language around women and children, to wash his mouth with soap before leaving the courtroom. A similar case in October 1979 saw a New York resident choose to wash his mouth out with soap, rather than serve ten days in prison for his disorderly conduct and obscenities.

In 1977, the National Criminal Justice Reference System published a report defending the use of corporal punishment in schools, in which a school administrator noted he documented 200 cases, over his 13-year career, of using corporal punishment, noting "That's not just using paddles in every instance, but if you shake a student, if you grab a student, if you wash a student's mouth out with soap, that's corporal punishment under the definition of the law".

In 1982, the Journal of Youth and Adolescence listed the practice, alongside paddling and hairpulling as a "moderate" punishment for children, beneath the realm of "severe" punishment such as whipping. Similarly in 1996, the American Academy of Pediatrics classified it as an alternative to spanking.

In 2006, students at the Massachusetts College of Liberal Arts carried out a peer-reviewed study on the ability of punishment to curb the use of profanity by interviewing colleagues on their remembered upbringings. They noted that the most commonly reported parental reaction was a verbal reprimand (41%). Soap in the mouth was mentioned in 20% of the episodes, and physical punishments were described in 14%.

== Safety ==
Washing out the mouth with soap is intended to be unpleasant, but is usually not intended to cause death or serious harm. Nonetheless, many people employ the aforementioned techniques with limited knowledge regarding the safety of ingesting their chosen cleansing agents. Agents likely to cause serious harm if swallowed include many automatic dishwasher detergents and laundry detergents. Even ordinary bar soaps and liquid hand soaps may cause harmful effects including vomiting, diarrhea, irritation of the lining of the mouth and digestive tract, and in rare instances, pulmonary aspiration. This is especially true if these products are ingested in large quantities.

== Legal ramifications ==
There have been a number of cases of arrests, charges, and civil lawsuits arising from the domestic discipline of washing another's mouth out with soap; often arising from the perception of abuse of parental authority by an outside figure.

In the United States, there is often variance between individual states as well. For example, North Carolina specifically instructs (as of 2012) its social workers that "washing a child's mouth out with soap is not considered an extreme measure", but the Florida Department of Children and Families permanently removed a mother's two children after she forced her 8-year-old daughter to chew soap after saying "fuck", leading to an allergic reaction.

== Notable cases ==
- In 1890, a father submitted a complaint to the Brooklyn, Nevada school board noting that a teacher had washed his daughter's mouth out with soap, after she lied to the teacher.
- In March 1949, Mary L. Muick was granted a divorce against her husband Joseph Muick in San Jose, California after he retaliated against her own threats to soap his son's mouth for foul language at a family gathering by forcibly washing her mouth with soap.
- Through the 1960s and 1970s, Sister Marie Docherty was accused of mistreating girls in her care at Nazareth House in Aberdeen, Scotland; including washing their mouths out with soap if they swore.
- In October 1979, a man convicted of disorderly conduct in Cortland, New York was given the choice between a $50 fine or having his mouth washed with soap. He elected to take the soap.
- In November 1980, an African American mother in Albany, Georgia appealed to the school board to fire the Caucasian teacher who had washed her daughter's mouth out with soap. When the school board refused, 500 black families picketed the school board.
- Convicted murderer Steven W. Bowman was alleged to have washed out his girlfriend's mouth with soap in July 2000, when she mentioned her other romantic partner's name; he went on to murder his girlfriend's lover.
- A teacher in Rochester, New York was suspended in 2004 for washing out the mouth of a student for using vulgar language. Following her suspension, parents and family members of her students signed a petition supporting her actions and requesting her reinstatement.
- Washington Senator R. Lorraine Wojahn noted that her mother washed out her mouth with soap when she was five years old, for trying some of her father's chewing tobacco.
- Former president George W. Bush recalled that his mother had washed his mouth out with soap for "getting fresh" with her.
- Following Toledo, Ohio mayor Carty Finkbeiner's use of profanity in a news conference in 1998, presidential candidate Ralph Nader sent him a bar of soap with which to wash out his mouth.

== See also ==
- Hotsaucing
- Castor oil
- Grounding (discipline technique)
- Tantrum
- Teenage rebellion
- Time-out (parenting)
