= School corporal punishment in the United States =

Legality of corporal punishment in schools in the United States Corporal punishment in public and private schools illegal Corporal punishment in public schools illegal Corporal punishment in public schools legal under state law, but banned in all school districts Corporal punishment in public schools legal but unused Corporal punishment in public schools is illegal only for students with disabilities Corporal punishment in public schools legal

Corporal punishment, sometimes referred to as "physical punishment" or "physical discipline", has been defined as the use of physical force, no matter how light, to cause deliberate bodily pain or discomfort in response to undesired behavior. In the United States, school corporal punishment takes the form of a school teacher or administrator striking a student's buttocks with a wooden paddle (often called "spanking" or "paddling"). The strikes are referred to as "swats", "licks" or "pops".

The practice was held constitutional in the 1977 Supreme Court case Ingraham v. Wright, where the Court held that the "cruel and unusual punishments" clause of the Eighth Amendment to the United States Constitution did not apply to disciplinary corporal punishment in public schools, being restricted to the treatment of prisoners convicted of a crime. In the years since, a number of U.S. states have banned corporal punishment in public schools. The most recent state to outlaw it was Idaho in 2023, and the latest de facto statewide ban was in Kentucky on November 2, 2023, when the last school district in the state that had not yet banned it did so. In 2014, a student was struck in a U.S. public school an average of once every 30 seconds.

As of 2024, corporal punishment is legal in private schools in every U.S. state except Illinois, Iowa, Maryland, New Jersey and New York, legal in public schools in 17 states, and practiced in 12 of the states.

Corporal punishment in school has been outlawed in Canada, Australia, New Zealand, Japan, South Korea, Israel, and most developed countries in Europe, which makes the United States one of only two developed countries where corporal punishment in school is still allowed, the other being Singapore. The practice is banned in 128 countries.

The USA has signed but not ratified the UN Convention on the Rights of the Child. In ratifying the International Covenant on Civil and Political Rights, the US entered a reservation stating that “the United States considers itself bound by Article 7 to the extent that ‘cruel, inhuman or degrading treatment or punishment’ means the cruel and unusual treatment or punishment prohibited by the Fifth, Eighth, and/or Fourteenth Amendments to the Constitution of the United States”.

== History ==
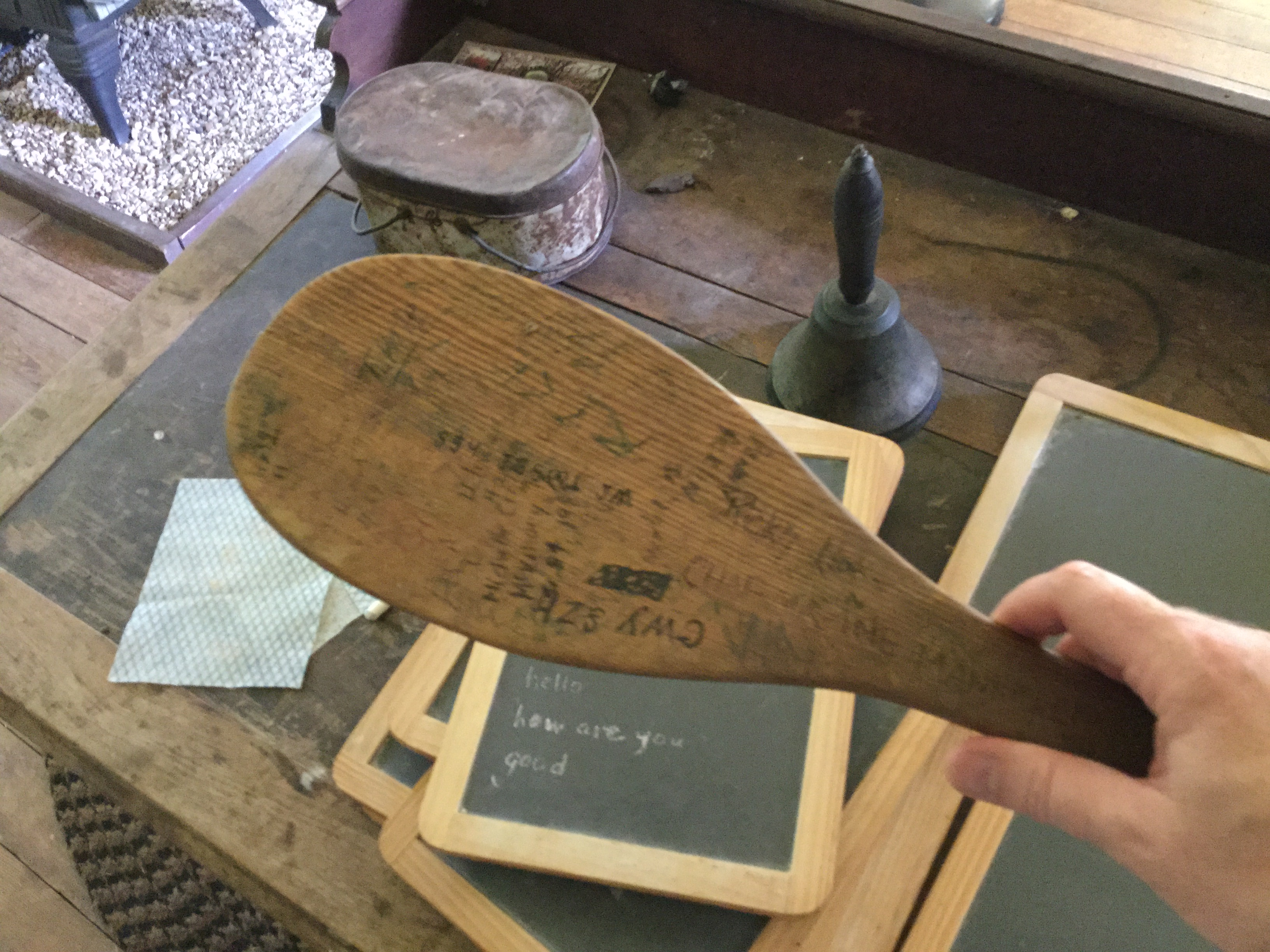
Signed wooden paddle in the Cherokee Heritage Center

Corporal punishment was widely used in U.S. schools during the 19th and 20th centuries as a way to motivate students to perform better academically and maintain objectively good standards of behavior. The practice was generally considered a fair and rational way to discipline school children, particularly given its parallels to the criminal justice system, and teachers in the late 19th century were encouraged to employ corporal punishment over other types of discipline. In the English-speaking world, the right of teachers to discipline children is enshrined in the common-law doctrine in loco parentis (Latin for "in the place of the parent"), which places a legal responsibility on authority-holders to take on the functions of a parent in some instances.

Some of the earliest parental opposition to corporal punishment in schools occurred in England in 1899 in the case Gardiner v. Bygrave, in which a teacher in London was acquitted after a parent took him to court for assault after he physically punished their son. This case set a precedent that schools could discipline children in the way they saw fit, regardless of the wishes of the parent regarding the physical punishment of their child. Over the next century, the conception of corporal punishment as a common component of disciplining students in public schools would be challenged in various countries, but opposition to corporal punishment in schools would not make it to the U.S. Supreme Court until 1977.

=== Federal law ===
In 1977, the question of the legality of corporal punishment in schools was brought to the Supreme Court. At this point, only New Jersey (1867), Massachusetts (1971), Hawaii (1973), and Maine (1975) had outlawed physical punishment in public schools, and just New Jersey had also outlawed the practice in private schools.

The U.S. Supreme Court upheld the legality of corporal punishment in schools in the landmark Ingraham v. Wright case. The court ruled five to four that the corporal punishment of James Ingraham, who was restrained by his assistant principal and paddled by the principal over twenty times, ultimately requiring medical attention, did not violate the Eighth Amendment, which protects citizens from cruel and unusual punishment. They further concluded that corporal punishment did not violate the due process clause of the Fourteenth Amendment, since teachers or administrators administering excessive punishment can face criminal charges. This case established a precedent of "reasonable, but not excessive" punishment of students and was criticized by some scholars as "an apparent low point in American teacher-student relations."

The Ingraham v. Wright ruling firmly pushed the decision of whether or not to outlaw corporal punishment in schools squarely onto state legislators. A majority of state bans on corporal punishment have occurred in the intervening years since 1977 with the largest push for abolition taking place between 1985 and 1994.

=== State law ===
The first state to abolish school corporal punishment was New Jersey in 1867. In 1894, a Newark bill challenged this ruling, arguing that whipping should be legal if parents consented to it; the New Jersey House defeated that bill, with one doctor's testimonial asserting that the bill's provisions "would expose children who did not have thoughtful and careful parents to the cruel discrimination of the teachers." The second state to ban corporal punishment in schools was Massachusetts, 104 years later in 1971. As of 2024, corporal punishment is banned in public schools in 33 states and the District of Columbia (see list below). The use of corporal punishment in private schools is legally permitted in nearly every state. Only New Jersey, Iowa, Maryland, New York, and Illinois prohibit it in both public and private schools. Corporal punishment is still used in schools to a significant (though declining) extent in some public schools in Alabama, Arkansas, Georgia, Louisiana, Mississippi, Oklahoma, Tennessee, and Texas.

== Current state law ==
State	Ban status (public)	Ban status (private)
Alabama	Not banned	Not banned
Alaska	Banned since 1989	Not banned
Arizona	Not banned, but no reported use	Not banned
Arkansas	Not banned	Not banned
California	Banned since 1986	Not banned
Colorado	Banned since 2023	Not banned
Connecticut	Banned since 1989	Not banned
Delaware	Banned since 2003	Not banned
District of Columbia	Banned since 1977	Not banned
Florida	Not banned, but parental consent is required since July 1, 2025.	Not banned
Georgia	Not banned	Not banned
Hawaii	Banned since 1973	Not banned
Idaho	Banned since 2023	Not banned
Illinois	Banned since 1994	Banned since 2024
Indiana	Not banned	Not banned
Iowa	Banned since 1989	Banned since 1989
Kansas	Not banned, but no reported use	Not banned
Kentucky	Not banned under state law but banned by every public school district in the state as of November 2, 2023	Not banned
Louisiana	In the state of Louisiana, the use of corporal punishment in public schools is not entirely prohibited by law, but its application has been restricted and made conditional upon the mandatory consent of the student's parents or legal guardians. Permission must be expressly granted in writing and is valid solely for the corresponding school year. Furthermore, the use of physical force is strictly prohibited on students with special needs or individual accommodation plans.	
Maine	Banned since 1975	Not banned
Maryland	Banned since 1993	Banned since 2023
Massachusetts	Banned since 1971	Not banned
Michigan	Banned since 1989	Not banned
Minnesota	Banned since 1989	Not banned
Mississippi	Banned since July 1, 2019 (but only for students with disabilities or special education plans)	Not banned
Missouri	Not banned	Not banned
Montana	Banned since 1991	Not banned
Nebraska	Banned since 1988	Not banned
Nevada	Banned since 1993	Not banned
New Hampshire	Banned since 1983	Not banned
New Jersey	Banned since 1867	Banned since 1867
New Mexico	Banned since 2011	Not banned
New York	Banned since 1985	Banned since 2023
North Carolina	Not banned under state law but banned by every public school district in the state as of October 2, 2018.	Not banned
North Dakota	Banned since 1989	Not banned
Ohio	Banned since 2009	Not banned
Oklahoma	Banned since November 1, 2017 but only for students with disabilities unless a parent gives written consent	Not banned
Oregon	Banned since 1989	Not banned
Pennsylvania	Banned since 2005	Not banned
Rhode Island	Banned since 1977	Not banned
South Carolina	Not banned	Not banned
South Dakota	Banned since 1990	Not banned
Tennessee	Banned since July 1, 2018 but only for those with disabilities unless a parent gives written consent	Not banned
Texas	Not banned	Not banned
Utah	Banned since 1992	Not banned
Vermont	Banned since 1985	Not banned
Virginia	Banned since 1989	Not banned
Washington	Banned since 1993	Not banned
West Virginia	Banned since 1994	Not banned
Wisconsin	Banned since 1988	Not banned
Wyoming	Not banned, but no reported use	Not banned

== Trends ==
States that legally allow corporal punishment in public schools
Alabama	Kansas	Oklahoma
Arizona	Kentucky	South Carolina
Arkansas	Louisiana	Tennessee
Florida	Mississippi	Texas
Georgia	Missouri	Wyoming
Indiana	North Carolina	

The prevalence of school corporal punishment has decreased since the 1970s, declining from four percent of the total number of children in schools in 1978 to less than one percent in 2014. This reduction is partially explained by the increasing number of states banning corporal punishment from public schools between 1974 and 1994.

The number of instances of corporal punishment in U.S. schools has also declined in recent years. In the 2002–2003 school year, federal statistics estimated that 300,000 children were disciplined with corporal punishment at school at least once. In the 2006–2007 school year, this number was reduced to 223,190 instances. According to the Department of Education, over 166,000 students in public schools were physically punished during the 2011–2012 school year. In the 2013–2014 academic year, this number was reduced to 109,000 students.

As of the 2011–2012 academic year, 19 states legally allowed school corporal punishment. Approximately 14 percent of the schools in those 19 states reported the use of corporal punishment, and one in eight students attended schools that use this practice.

In 2022, the number of the students spanked by their teachers dropped to circa 70,000. In April 2023 there are still 17 states where this practice has not been officially banned.

== Procedure ==
=== Rules ===
Each state has the authority to define corporal punishment in its state laws, so bans on corporal punishment differ from state to state. For example, in Texas, teachers are permitted to paddle children and to use "any other physical force" to control children in the name of discipline; in Alabama, the rules are more explicit: teachers are permitted to use a "wooden paddle approximately 24 inches (610 mm) in length, 3 inches (76 mm) wide and 0.5 inches (13 mm) thick."

Students can be physically punished from kindergarten to the end of high school, meaning that even legal adults who have reached the age of majority are sometimes spanked by school officials. In these states, parents or students are often (but not always) given a choice between corporal punishment and other disciplinary measures such as suspension or detention.

=== Statistics ===
The majority of students who experience corporal punishment reside in the Southern United States; Department of Education data from 2011 to 2012 show that 70 percent of students subjected to corporal punishment were from the five states of Alabama, Arkansas, Georgia, Mississippi and Texas, with the latter two states accounting for 35 percent of corporal punishment cases.

=== Behaviors that elicit corporal punishment ===
Several studies have explored which behaviors elicit corporal punishment as a response, but so far there is not a cohesive and standardized system in use within states or across states. Human Rights Watch conducted a series of interviews with paddled students and teachers in Mississippi and Texas, and found that most corporal punishment was for minor infractions, such as violating the dress code, being tardy, talking in class, running in the hallway and going to the bathroom without permission. A review of over 6,000 disciplinary files in Florida for 1987–1988 school year found that corporal punishment use in schools was not related to the severity of student's misbehavior or with the frequency of the infraction. Czumbil and Hyman reviewed over 500 media stories about corporal punishment in newspapers from 1975 to 1992 and coded the reason of the punishment and its severity. They found that the nature of the child's misbehavior (violent or non-violent) did not meaningfully influence whether the student was physically punished or not.

=== Disparities ===
Many studies have found that there are disparities in the physical punishment of students across racial and ethnic lines, gender and disability status. In general, results suggest that boys, students of color and students with disabilities are more likely to be targets of corporal punishment. These disparities may violate three federal laws that prohibit discrimination by race, gender and disability status: Title VI of the Civil Rights Act of 1964, Title IX of the Education Amendments of 1972, and Section 504 of the Rehabilitation Act of 1973.

==== By gender ====
At the turn of the 20th century, both boys and girls received roughly equal levels of corporal punishments in U.S. schools, but girls were more likely to report their punishment as unjust or unfair. However, while punishment was seen as a builder of masculinity for boys, girls were not expected to experience the same benefits, so their punishment was often, but not always, more lenient. This trend in gender parity changed significantly in the next century.

According to a 2015 study, boys are more likely than girls to be physically punished in schools, and this disparity has persisted for decades. In 1992, boys accounted for 81 percent of all incidents of physical discipline in schools.

Differences in behavior (and perceived behavior) can explain part of this imbalance, but do not account for the entire discrepancy between the genders. Boys have been found to be two times as likely as girls to be disciplined for misbehavior in school, but they are four times as likely to be disciplined with corporal punishment.

When race and gender are considered together, black boys are 16 times as likely to be subject of corporal punishment as white girls. Among children with disabilities, black boys have the highest probability of being subject to corporal punishment, followed by white boys, black girls and white girls. While black boys are 1.8 times as likely as white boys to be physically punished, black girls are three times more likely than white girls to receive corporal punishment.

==== By race or ethnicity ====
The race and ethnic disparities in school corporal punishment have decreased within groups over time, but the relative prevalence of corporal punishment between groups has remained stable. Black students are physically punished at higher rates than white or Hispanics. In contrast, Hispanic students are less likely than white students to receive corporal punishment. One study found that African-American students were more likely than either white or Hispanic students to be physically punished, by 2.5 times and 6.5 times respectively. Another study calculated the proportion of black students who were physically punished to the proportion of white students who were by state, and found that for the 2011–2012 academic year, black children in Alabama and Mississippi were over five times more likely to be disciplined with corporal punishment than their white counterparts. In other southeastern states (Florida, Arkansas, Georgia, Louisiana and Tennessee) black children were more than three times more likely to receive corporal punishment than white children.

A review of over 4,000 discipline events in Florida from 1987 to 1989 across nine schools revealed that, although black students constituted 22 percent of school enrollment, they accounted for over 50 percent of all cases of corporal punishment. The North Carolina Department of Public Instruction in 2013 published a review of corporal punishment cases in the 2011–2012 academic year founding that corporal punishment was disproportionately applied to Native American students, who represented 58 percent of all cases of corporal punishment while being only two percent of the student population.

The disparity by race in the use of corporal punishment in schools goes in line with findings of other methods of discipline, where black children are two to three times more likely than white children to be suspended or expelled from schools. According to a study by the American Psychological Association, these imbalances are not due to a higher likelihood of misbehaving by children of one race over another, or the socio-economic status of the children.

==== By disability status ====
Children with physical, mental, or emotional disabilities are afforded special protections and services in U.S. public schools. However, they are not afforded protection from school corporal punishment in the states that allow it, and in many states they are actually at greater risk for receiving corporal punishment than their non-disabled peers. According to a report jointly authored by Human Rights Watch and the American Civil Liberties Union, the United States Department of Education's Civil Rights Data Collection for 2006 shows that students with disabilities are subjected to corporal punishment at disproportionately high rates for their share of the population. Representative Carolyn McCarthy remarked in a 2010 congressional hearing that students with disabilities are subjected to corporal punishment at "approximately twice the rate of the general student population in some States."

Children with disabilities are 50 percent more likely to experience school corporal punishment in more than 30 percent of the school districts in Alabama, Arkansas, Georgia, Louisiana, Mississippi and Tennessee. However, in some school districts among Alabama, Mississippi and Tennessee, children with disability status are five times more likely to be subject of corporal punishment than peers without disabilities.

=== Risks for school administrators ===
Even if several US states have approved strong immunity laws, there is always a risk for a principal or a teacher to be sued in court by parents who estimate that the corporal punishment went too far. The existence of social networks exposes the school administrator to public criticism and personal attack. In Texas, several principals have seen their certificate put at risk because of corporal punishments administered in previous school districts. Even when there's been no condemnation from a court, some parents may consider school administrators unfit if they have previously administered corporal punishments to students.

The presence of a witness during paddling is intended to protect the school administrator from any accusation of sexual abuses. However, the practice itself is at high risk due to the line between punishment and sexual assault being very narrow, especially with teens already in puberty.

As mentioned by Victor Vieth, senior director and founder of the Gundersen National Child Protection Training Center: "If you're leaving it up to teachers" to determine whether a student should be paddled, he said, "I'd tell them you do it at your own risk. If you exceed what a jury in your community says is reasonable, you're criminally liable."

== Effects ==
Although there is literature on the effects of parental use of corporal punishment on health and school performance, corporal punishment in schools has been understudied. There are correlational studies that linked the use of corporal punishment in schools with detrimental physical and psychological effects on children, and also provide evidence about its long-term effects.

According to these studies, children exposed to school corporal punishment are more likely to have conduct disorder problems, to experience feelings of inadequacy and resentment, to be aggressive and violent, and to experience reduced problem-solving abilities, social competence and academic achievement. Other studies have suggested that corporal punishment in schools can deter children's cognitive development, as children subject to corporal punishment in schools have a more restricted vocabulary, poorer school marks, and lower IQ scores. Moreover, disparities in the use of corporal punishment among gender, race and disability status can be perceived by children as discrimination. This perceived discrimination has been related with lower self-esteem, lower positive mood, higher depression and anxiety. These effects can also manifest as low academic engagement and more negative school behaviors, which exacerbate the existing gap in discipline policies along race and gender lines.

Researchers have found a negative correlation between legality of corporal punishment and test scores. Students who are not exposed to school corporal punishment exhibit better results on the ACT test compared to students in states that allow disciplinary corporal punishment in schools. In 2010, 75 percent of states that allow corporal punishment in schools scored below average on the ACT composite, while three-quarters of non-paddling states scored above the national average. Improvement trend among the years also differ; in the last 18 years, 66 percent of non-paddling states have above average rates of improvement, while 50 percent of spanking states were above the national trend of improvement.

Furthermore, while corporal punishment is sometimes lauded as an alternative to suspension, the lack of formal training for U.S. teachers means that there is no consistently implemented style of corporal punishment that takes into account the size, age, or psychological profile of students. This leaves students more vulnerable to physical and psychological injury.

In November 2018 the American Academy of Pediatrics issued a new policy statement taking a stronger stance against corporal punishment, including spanking, twenty years after releasing its last position statement on effective discipline.

The AAP mentioned in particular the risks on mental health issues and anger management problems, in children and teens who received corporal punishments in school.

== Public opinion ==
Public-opinion research has found that most Americans are not in favor of school corporal punishment; in polls taken in 2002 and 2005, American adults were respectively 72% and 77% opposed to the use of corporal punishment by teachers. Moreover, a national survey conducted on teachers ranked corporal punishment as the least effective method to discipline offenders among eight possible techniques.

A bill to end the use of corporal punishment in schools was introduced into the United States House of Representatives in June 2010 during the 111th Congress. The bill, H.R. 5628, was referred to the United States House Committee on Education and Labor, where it was not brought up for a vote.

The United States' National Association of Secondary School Principals (NASSP) opposes the use of corporal punishment in schools, defined as the deliberate infliction of pain in response to students' unacceptable behavior or language. In articulating its opposition, it cites the disproportionate use of corporal punishment on black students; potential adverse effects on students' self-image and school achievement; correlation between school corporal punishment and increased truancy, drop-out rates, violence, and vandalism by youth; the potential for misuse or injury to students; and increased liability for schools.

Some scholars, such as Elizabeth Gershoff and Sarah Font, perceive a double standard when it comes to the physical punishment of children versus adults. The Board of Education in Pickens County, Alabama recommends that teachers use a two-foot-long paddle to discipline children; in some cases, this object is more than half the height of an elementary school-aged child. The two scholars assert that in any other context, "the act of an adult hitting another person with a board [two feet long] (or really, of any size) would be considered assault with a weapon and would be punishable under criminal law".

However, some teachers and administrators defend the use of corporal punishment in the classroom as a reasonable alternative to other types of disciplinary action, like suspension, which have been shown to negatively impact children's classroom performance and social skills.

== See also ==
- Corporal punishment of minors in the United States
- Hazing in fraternities and sororities
- Corporal punishment in the home
- Judicial corporal punishment
