= Blanket training =

Parenting practice

Blanket training, also known as blanket time, is a method adapted from the methods encouraged in To Train Up a Child, published in 1994 and written by Christian fundamentalists Michael and Debi Pearl. To Train Up a Child promotes several harsh parenting techniques, with a focus on child obedience, which have been linked to multiple child deaths.

Blanket training is an allocated amount of time during the day where an infant or toddler is required to remain on a blanket or play mat for a limited period of time, with a few selected toys. When the child moves to leave the blanket, parents are instructed to hit the child with a flexible ruler, glue stick, or another similar object. Many of those doing it have voiced online that they start by doing five minutes a day and build up the intervals over time, with some extending it to 30 minutes or more.

Proponents of the technique claim that blanket training helps very young children to learn self-control, however, no empirical evidence currently exists to back these claims.

== Criticism ==
Critics of the technique cite the use of corporal punishment in conjunction with blanket training, which is not widely accepted by parenting experts, as being inherently ineffective in achieving parents’ long-term goals of decreasing aggressive and defiant behaviour in children or of promoting regulated and socially competent behaviour in children. Research suggests physical discipline by parents has been associated with heightened risk for harm to children’s mental health, as well as to their cognitive, behavioural, social, and emotional development.
