= Cowell Memorial Hospital =

Historic place in Berkeley, California

- U.S. National Register of Historic Places
- Berkeley Landmark
- Cowell Memorial Hospital

- Location within Oakland, California Location within California Location within the United States
- Location: 2215 College Ave., Berkeley, California
- Coordinates: 37.871667°N 122.253056°W
- Built: 1930; 96 years ago
- Architects: Weihe, Frick & Kruse and Arthur Brown Jr.
- NRHP reference No.: 92001730
- BERKL No.: 142

Significant dates
- Added to NRHP: January 6, 1993
- Designated BERKL: November 19, 1990

Cowell Memorial Hospital, also known as Ernest V. Cowell Memorial Hospital, is a historical former building on the UC campus in Berkeley, California. The Cowell Memorial Hospital was built in 1930 and demolished in 1993. The building and its site was listed on the National Register of Historic Places on January 6, 1993.

== History ==
The hospital's entrance and Hospital's south wing were designed by Arthur Brown Jr. in the Neoclassical style and built in 1930. The hospital's east pavilion, designed by Weihe, Frick & Kruse and built in 1954. The hospital's north wing was designed by E. Geoffrey Bangs and built in 1960. After being demolished in 1993, a new building was built, Haas School of Business. The Cowell Memorial Hospital had a Residence Program from 1962 to 1974, noted for its work with disabled students.

National Register of Historic Places was given both for the buildings and the contribution it health care work. Some of the work noted is the called the Cowell experiment, by Ed Roberts, The Father of Independent Living.

== See also ==
- National Register of Historic Places listings in Alameda County, California
- List of Berkeley Landmarks in Berkeley, California
