= Ingraham v. Wright =

- Supreme Court of the United States

Argued November 2–3, 1976 Decided April 19, 1977
- Full case name: Ingraham, et al., v. Wright, et al.
- Citations: 430 U.S. 651 (more) 97 S. Ct. 1401; 51 L. Ed. 2d 711
- Argument: Oral argument
- Reargument: Reargument
- Opinion announcement: Opinion announcement

Holding
- The cruel and unusual punishment clause of the Eighth Amendment did not apply to corporal punishment as a disciplinary practice in public schools, and the due process clause of the Fourteenth Amendment did not require notice or a hearing prior to imposition of such punishment, as the state's laws authorized the practice and allowed common law constraints and remedies. The primary purpose of the Cruel and Unusual Punishments Clause has always been considered, and properly so, to be directed at the method or kind of punishment imposed for the violation of criminal statutes. When public school teachers or administrators impose disciplinary corporal punishment, the Eight Amendment is inapplicable (lexisnexis)

Court membership
- Chief Justice Warren E. Burger Associate Justices William J. Brennan Jr. · Potter Stewart; Byron White · Thurgood Marshall; Harry Blackmun · Lewis F. Powell Jr. William Rehnquist · John P. Stevens

Case opinions
- Majority: Powell, joined by Burger, Stewart, Blackmun, Rehnquist
- Dissent: White, joined by Brennan, Marshall, Stevens
- Dissent: Stevens

Laws applied
- U.S. Const. amends. VIII, XIV

Ingraham v. Wright, 430 U.S. 651 (1977), was a United States Supreme Court case that upheld the disciplinary corporal punishment policy of Florida's public schools by a 5-4 vote. The Court also held that the Eighth Amendment did not apply to corporal punishment, and that the Due Process Clause of the Fourteenth Amendment did not require notice or a hearing prior to the imposition of such punishment.

== Background ==
James Ingraham was a 14-year-old eighth grade student at Charles R. Drew Junior High School in 1970. On October 6, 1970, Ingraham was accused of failing to promptly leave the stage of the school auditorium when asked to do so by a teacher. He was then taken to the school principal's office, where he stated that he was not guilty of the accusation against him. Willie J. Wright, Jr., the principal, ordered Ingraham to bend over so that Wright could spank Ingraham with a spanking paddle. When Ingraham declined to bend over and allow himself to be paddled, he was forcibly placed face-down on the top of a table. Lemmie Deliford, the assistant principal, held Ingraham's arms and Solomon Barnes, an assistant to the principal, held Ingraham's legs. While Ingraham was being restrained, Wright used a spanking paddle to hit Ingraham more than 20 times.

The paddling was so severe that he suffered a hematoma requiring medical attention. Physicians instructed Ingraham to rest at home for a total of eleven days. He and his parents sued the school, calling it "cruel and unusual punishment" and loss of liberty, but lost the initial trial. The Florida state court held that Florida tort laws provided sufficient remedies to satisfy Ingraham's due process loss of liberty claims. The court also held that the U.S. Constitution's prohibition against cruel and unusual punishment does not apply to the corporal punishment of children in public schools, and that the constitution's due process clause does not require notice and a hearing prior to the imposition of corporal punishment in public schools.

== Opinion of the Court ==
The Supreme Court declined to consider the plaintiffs' substantive due process claims in Ingraham v. Wright. Lower courts have adopted a variety of approaches to the substantive due process issue, none of which offer much protection for students who are subjected to corporal punishment at school. The Supreme Court has repeatedly denied certiorari (judicial review) on the issue of whether school corporal punishment constitutes a substantive due process constitutional violation.

As of 1994, Lemmie Deliford, one of the administrators involved, was still a proponent of corporal punishment in schools.

== See also ==
- School corporal punishment in the United States
