= Diana Baumrind =

American psychologist (1927–2018)

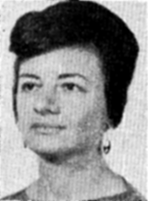
- Diana Blumberg Baumrind c. 1965
- Born: August 23, 1927; New York City, U.S.
- Died: September 13, 2018 (aged 91); Oakland, California, U.S.
- Education: Hunter College; University of California, Berkeley
- Employers: Cowell Memorial Hospital; University of California, Berkeley; U. S. Public Health Service
- Known for: Parenting styles

Academic background
- Doctoral advisor: Hubert Coffey
- Influences: Theodor Adorno; Else Frenkel-Brunswik; Egon Brunswik; David Krech

Academic work
- Discipline: Developmental psychologist

Diana Blumberg Baumrind (August 23, 1927 – September 13, 2018) was an American developmental psychologist known for her research on parenting styles and for her critique of the use of deception in psychological research.

== Early life and education ==
Baumrind was born into a Jewish community in New York City, the first of two daughters of Hyman and Mollie Blumberg. She completed her B.A. in Psychology and Philosophy at Hunter College in 1948, and her M.A. and Ph.D. in Psychology at the University of California, Berkeley. Her doctoral dissertation was entitled "Some personality and situational determinants of behaviour in a discussion group".

== Career ==
After being awarded her doctorate she served as a staff psychologist at Cowell Memorial Hospital in Berkeley. She was also director of two U. S. Public Health Service projects and a consultant on a California state project. From 1958-1960 she also had a private practice in Berkeley.

She was a developmental psychologist at the Institute of Human Development, University of California, Berkeley. She was known for her research on parenting styles and for her critique of deception in psychological research, especially Stanley Milgram's controversial experiment.

Baumrind defined three parenting styles:

- Authoritarian: the authoritarian parenting style is characterized by high demandingness with low responsiveness. The authoritarian parent is rigid, harsh, and demanding. Abusive parents usually fall in this category (although Baumrind is careful to emphasize that not all authoritarian parents are abusive).
- Permissive: this parenting style is characterized by low demandingness with high responsiveness. The permissive parent is overly responsive to the child's demands, seldom enforcing consistent rules. The "spoiled" child often has permissive parents.
- Authoritative: this parenting style is characterized by high demandingness with huge responsiveness. The authoritative parent is firm but not rigid, willing to make an exception when the situation warrants. The authoritative parent is responsive to the child's needs but not indulgent. Baumrind makes it clear that she favors the authoritative style.

Baumrind studied the effects of corporal punishment on children, and concluded that mild spanking, in the context of an authoritative (not authoritarian) parenting style, is unlikely to have a significant detrimental effect, if one is careful to control for other variables such as socioeconomic status. She observed that previous studies demonstrating a correlation between corporal punishment and bad outcomes failed to control for variables such as socioeconomic status. Low-income families are more likely to employ corporal punishment compared with affluent families. Children from low-income neighborhoods are more likely to commit violent crimes compared with children from affluent neighborhoods. But Baumrind believed that when appropriate controls are made for family income and other independent variables, mild corporal punishment per se does not increase the likelihood of bad outcomes. This assertion has in turn attracted criticism and counterpoints from other researchers in the same publication, for example: Whether harmful or not, there is still no consistent evidence of beneficial effects.

She was influenced in her studies by Theodor Adorno, Else Frenkel-Brunswik, Egon Brunswik, and David Krech

Baumrind died in September 2018 following a car accident.

== See also ==
- Parenting style - Maccoby and Martin expanded Baumrind's three parenting styles to four: authoritative, authoritarian, indulgent and neglectful.
