= Elizabeth Gershoff =

American psychologist

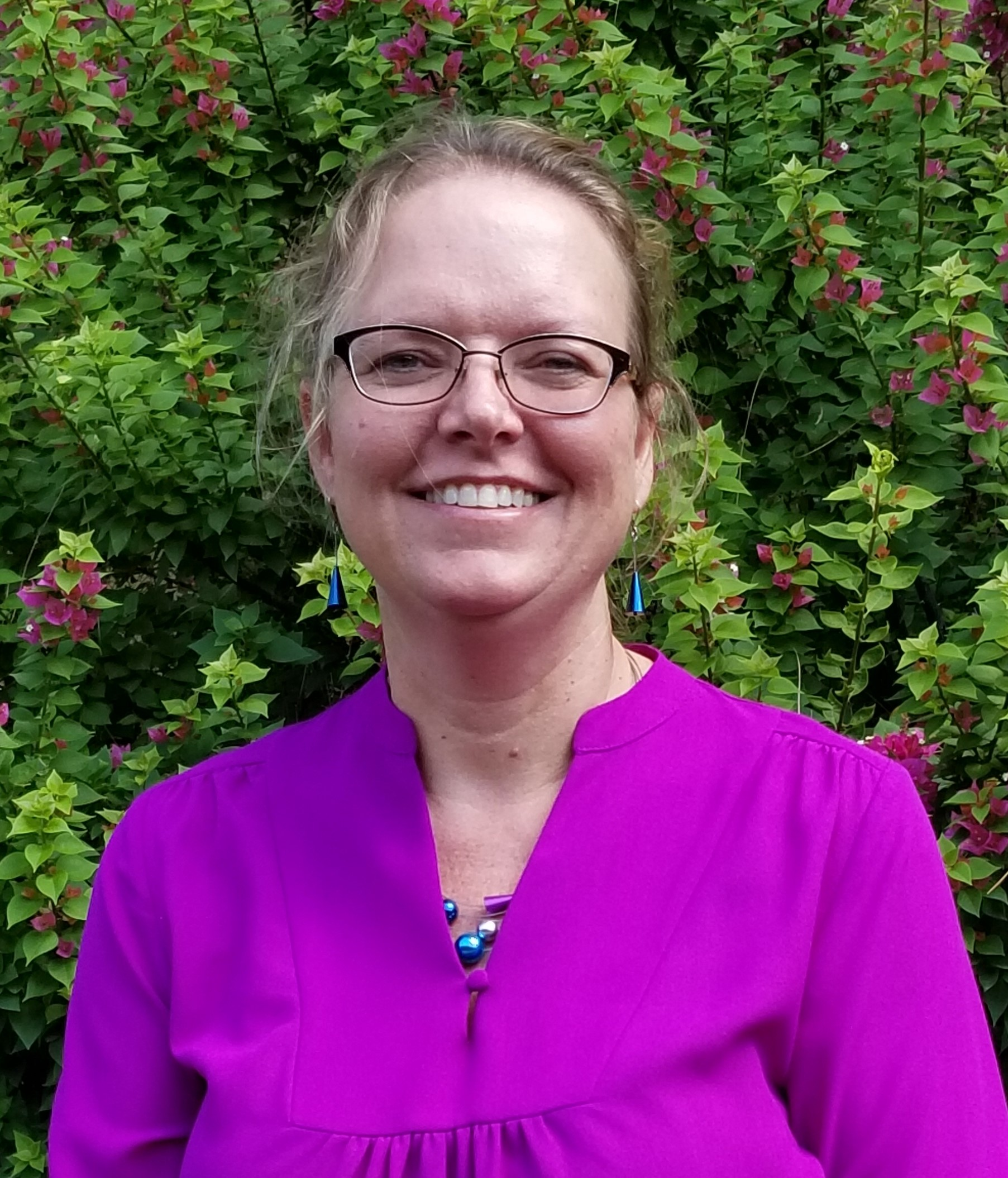
- Gershoff 2018

Academic background
- Education: University of Virginia; University of Texas at Austin

Academic work
- Discipline: Human Development and Family Science
- Sub-discipline: Developmental Psychology
- Institutions: University of Texas at Austin, College of Natural Sciences
- Main interests: How parental and school discipline affects children within contexts of income, neighborhood, and culture
- Notable ideas: Corporal punishment is detrimental to children's development
- Website: liberalarts.utexas.edu/prc/directory/faculty/ethomp

Elizabeth Thompson Gershoff is Professor of Human Development and Family Sciences at the University of Texas at Austin. She is known for her research on the impact of corporal punishment in the home and at school on children and their mental health.

Gershoff was awarded the 2014 Lifetime Legacy Achievement Award from the Center for the Human Rights of Children at Loyola University Chicago for her efforts to end "legalized violence" against children. In the book Corporal Punishment in U.S. Public Schools: Legal Precedents, Current Practices, and Future Policy, Gershoff and colleagues draw attention to the fact that corporal punishment in schools remains legal in 19 states. The authors estimate that nearly 200,000 children are victims of corporal punishment in schools and that many Americans are unaware of the physical injuries these children obtain from corporal punishment in school.

Gershoff's co-edited book Social Contexts of Child Development: Pathways of Influence and Implications for Practice and Policy, with Rashmita S. Mistry, and Danielle A. Crosby, received the 2014 Society for Research on Adolescence Social Policy Award for Best Edited Book. She is co-author of the popular textbook How Children Develop, with Robert S. Siegler, Jenny Saffran, Nancy Eisenberg, and Judy DeLoache.

== Biography ==
Gershoff received her Bachelor of Arts in Psychology and English Language and Literature at the University of Virginia in 1992. She went to graduate school at the University of Texas at Austin and obtained her PhD in Child Development and Family Relationships in 1998. Gershoff completed a post-doctoral fellowship at the Prevention Research Center and Department of Psychology of Arizona State University (1998-1999). She then worked as a researcher at the National Center for Children in Poverty at the Mailman School of Public Health at Columbia University (1999-2004). Gershoff joined the faculty of the School of Social Work at the University of Michigan in 2004. She joined the faculty of the School of Human Ecology at the University of Texas at Austin in 2009.

Gershoff's research has been funded through the Eunice Kennedy Shriver National Institute of Child Health and Human Development, the Centers for Disease Control and Prevention, the National Institute of Mental Health, and the National Science Foundation.

== Research ==
Gershoff's research focuses on the impact of parental discipline on child and youth development, while taking account of differences in background factors such as poverty, culture, school, and neighborhood. She also examines the effect of exposure to violence on child and youth development, and the efficacy of early childhood and parental educational programs. In 2016, Gershoff and her colleagues published the results of a meta-analysis of the effects of corporal punishment and physical abuse on children. The studies included in the meta-analysis involved more than 160,000 children and spanned over a 50-year period. The results provided clear evidence in support of the view that spanking children is harmful. The more children were spanked, the more likely they were to experience anti-social behavior, aggression, mental health problems, and cognitive difficulties. The effects of spanking were indistinguishable from the effects of physical abuse on child development outcomes.

Gershoff has argued that corporal punishment as a form of discipline fails to teach children why their behavior was wrong nor does it teach them what the appropriate behavior should have been. Parental use of physical punishment teaches children that violence is morally acceptable, causes fear to develop between the child and parent, and subsequently damages their relationship. She estimates that 80% of American children have received physical punishment from their parents by the time they reach the 5th grade and over 70% of parents agree or strongly agree with the sentiment that “children sometimes need a good, hard spanking”. Parents believe in the efficacy of corporal punishment in the absence of any valid evidence that spanking is necessary or effective at correcting misbehavior, regardless the age of the child. Other research provides evidence of intergenerational transmission of violence: individuals who received physical punishment as children are more likely to use physical punishment as adults when disciplining children.

== Representative Publications ==
- Gershoff, E. T. (2002). Corporal punishment by parents and associated child behaviors and experiences: a meta-analytic and theoretical review. Psychological Bulletin, 128(4), 539–579.
- Gershoff, E. T. (2010). More harm than good: A summary of scientific research on the intended and unintended effects of corporal punishment on children. Law and Contemporary Problems, 73(2), 31–56.
- Gershoff, E. T., & Bitensky, S. H. (2007). The Case Against Corporal Punishment of Children. Psychology, Public Policy, and Law, 13(4), 231–272.
- Gershoff, E. T., Aber, J. L., Raver, C. C., & Lennon, M. C. (2007). Income is not enough: Incorporating material hardship into models of income associations with parenting and child development. Child Development, 78(1), 70–95.
- Eisenberg, N., Gershoff, E. T., Fabes, R. A., Shepard, S. A., Cumberland, A. J., Losoya, S. H., ... & Murphy, B. C. (2001). Mother's emotional expressivity and children's behavior problems and social competence: Mediation through children's regulation. Developmental Psychology, 37(4), 475–490.
