= Time-out (parenting) =

Child discipline technique

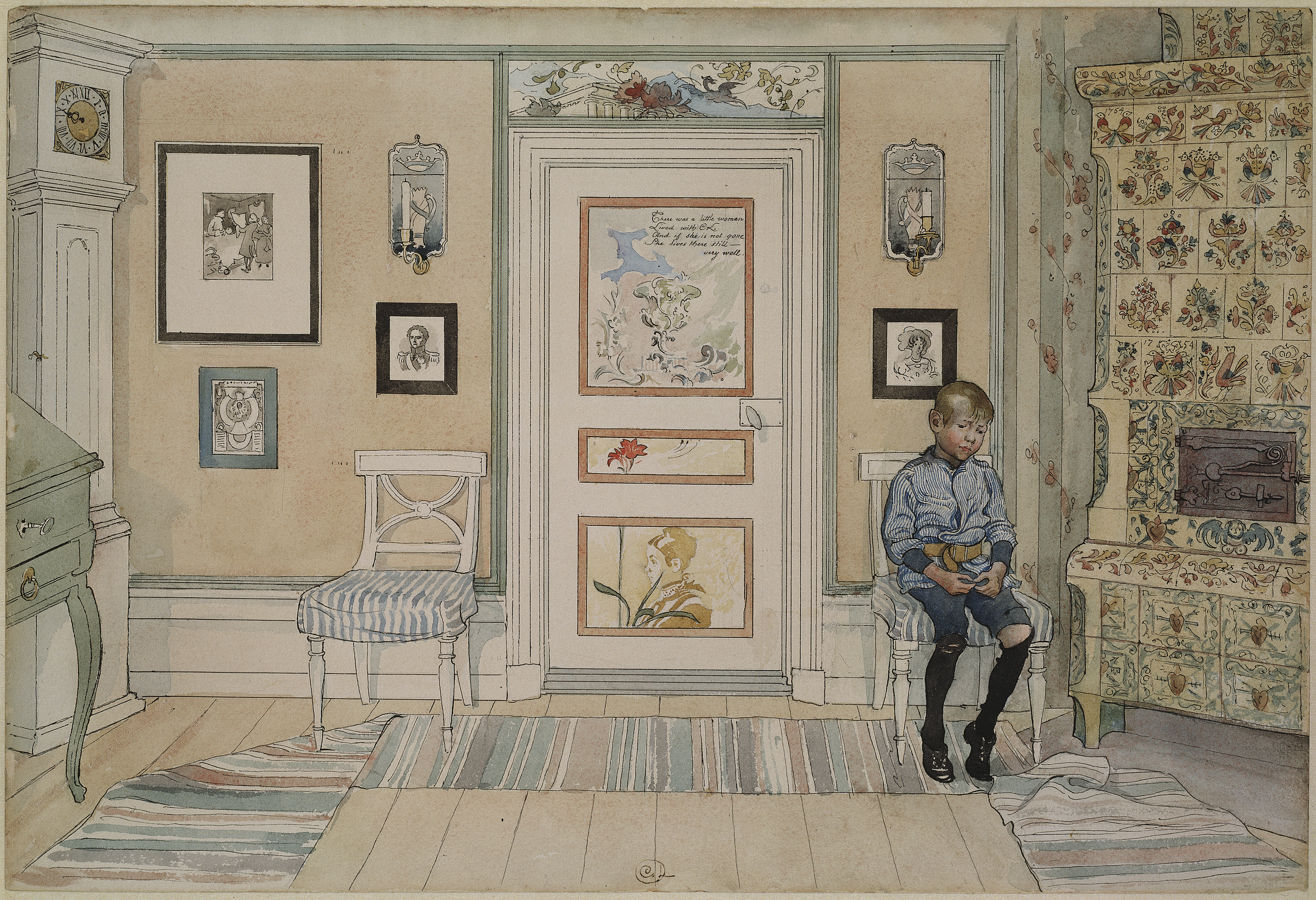
Time-out, painting by Carl Larsson

A time-out is a child discipline technique in which a child is temporarily removed from an environment where an unacceptable behavior has occurred. The goal is to discourage the behavior by depriving the child of an enjoyable environment. During time-outs, a corner or a similar space is designated, where the child is to sit or stand (hence the common term corner time). It is recommended by pediatricians and developmental psychologists as an effective form of discipline, and is especially popular in Western cultures.

In the UK, the punishment is often known as the naughty step or naughty chair. This term became popular in the US with the two reality TV series, Supernanny and Nanny 911.

== History ==
The concept of time-out was invented, named, and used by Arthur W. Staats in his extended work with his daughter (and later son), and was part of a long-term program of behavioral analysis beginning in 1958 that treated various aspects of child development. He introduced various elements that later composed foundations for applied behavior analysis and behavior therapy. (The token reward system was another invention by him.) Montrose Wolf, a graduate student assistant of Staats on several studies dealing with reading learning in preschoolers, used that background when he went to the University of Washington where he began his creative program of research. Wolf began the widespread use of Staats' time-out procedure in extending training methods to an autistic child (see the 1964 published study dealing with the behavioral treatment of a child).

Staats described the discipline of his two-year-old daughter in 1962: "I would put her in her crib and indicate that she had to stay there until she stopped crying. If we were in a public place [where her behavior was inappropriate], I would pick her up and go outside."

== Application ==
For Staats, the timeout period was ended when the child's misbehavior, such as crying inappropriately, ended. He considered removal from a positive emotional environment to one of lesser positivity as a very mild punishment. Various people have added their opinions regarding time-out as the following indicates.

Time out is a type two punishment procedure (negative punishment), and is used commonly in schools, colleges, offices, clinics and homes. To implement time out, a caregiver removes the child from a reinforcing activity for a short period of time, usually 5 to 15 minutes, in order to discourage inappropriate behavior and teach the child that engaging in problem behavior will result in decreased access to reinforcing items and events in the child's environment.

Time-outs may be on a chair, step, corner, bedroom, in front of or beside a door, or any other location where there are no distractions and reduced access to fun items, activities and people. This procedure is preferable to other punishments such as reprimanding, yelling at or spanking the child for their misbehavior, which are type one punishments (positive punishment). Time out time for children is usually a time for a child to think about the unacceptable behavior that he or she engaged in, instead of a time to read books, play with toys, listen to music, or watch TV. Engaging in other unacceptable behaviors during timeout, such as attempting to inflict serious injuries on a child's own body, damaging or destroying items in the child's own bedroom, or engaging in any other type of inappropriate behavior, including excessive crying, can result in additional disciplinary action such as a grounding being imposed on a child, or additional time being spent in time out. A child can also have books and toys and other privileges taken away as well for any of the above stated behaviors taking place during a timeout. Research has established that 15 minutes is the maximum time that a child should be kept in time out. However, shorter durations may be just as effective for behavior change.

For this disciplinary technique to be most effective and to produce the desired results, the child should be old enough to sit still and is required to remain there for a fixed period. Also, according to developmental psychologists, parents should evaluate each situation to determine what may be causing the misbehavior, such as a toy, frustration, hunger, or lack of sleep, and then address any underlying needs before a punishment contingency should be used. Any time they are trying to reduce a problem behavior, parents should be sure that they are also teaching and reinforcing the desired replacement behavior. Parents should also clearly explain why the child is being put in time out, and what the child needs to do to return to the reinforcing environment/be let out of time-out (but too much explanation can reinforce the unwanted behavior as a result of "misplaced adult attention"). Furthermore, the renowned developmental psychologist Kathleen Stassen Berger suggests that time-out should remain brief, proposing a general guideline: the length of time that the child should remain in time-out should correlate with the child's age – each year of the child's age constitutes one minute in time-out.

Time-out is one behavior control method based on removing positive reinforcement for a brief time. Less elaborate methods from the same class like tactical ignoring, or planned ignoring, also can be effective in cases where parental/caregiver attention is the positive reinforcement for negative behavior. This class of methods are more effective if the child gets a significant amount positive reinforcement (praise, attention) for good behavior. All punishment procedures can evoke other problem behaviors, damage rapport, or evoke escape or avoidant behaviors. For this, and other ethical reasons, behavior analysts exhaust all options for using differential reinforcement and/or extinction procedures to reduce problem behavior, before considering the use of punishment procedures.

== Effectiveness ==
Several studies show that time-out is an especially effective disciplinary strategy, reducing aggressive and non-compliant behavior, when other positive parenting methods are also used. Meta-analytic evidence suggests time-out is highly effective at reducing problem behavior in young oppositional defiant children, and increasing child compliance. The American Academy of Pediatrics and the Society of Clinical Child and Adolescent Psychology have issued statements supporting the use of time-outs as a disciplinary tool.

In order for time-out to be effective, the non-time-out or "time-in" environment must be sufficiently reinforcing in contrast to the time-out environment, making time-out an unwanted experience.

There are differences between strategies for ending time out. Some proponents of time-outs insist on silence and stillness from the child during the time-out, or the use of a "release-contingency," where the child is required to be sitting peacefully at the end of the time-out period. However, the majority of research does not consistently suggest that these types of contingencies improve the effectiveness of time-outs, though no research suggests that they are harmful.

Those who use time-out for children to get anger and frustration "out of their system" or for children to think about their behavior are using time-out in a way that is different than those basing it on operant conditioning principles (that time-out from positive reinforcement may reduce recurrences of the unwanted target behavior).

In a study by Donaldson and Vollmer, the efficacy of a fixed duration time-out and a release contingency time-out were compared. In the fixed duration condition, children were sent to time-out for a total of 4 minutes and were released from time-out whether or not they performed problem behavior during the time-out session. In the release contingency condition, children were not released from time-out if they were performing problem behavior during the last 30 seconds of their time-out. The time-out was extended until there were no occurrences of problem behavior for a total of 30 seconds or until the time-out reached the ten-minute mark. Results showed that both time-out procedures were successful in reducing the problem behavior for the subjects. The subjects in the release contingency did not benefit from staying in time-out for an extended period of time either. Moreover, the results show that only four minutes is necessary for a successful time-out procedure.

The effectiveness of time-out also varies with each individual child, dependent on the child's age, temperament and emotional wellness.

In September 2019, a study published by the University of Michigan concluded that using timeouts to discipline children was not harmful to them nor was it found to be harmful to children's relationships with their parents. The eight-year study found that children disciplined with timeouts did not display increased levels of anxiety or aggression.

== Disadvantages ==
Critics of time-out include Thomas Gordon, Gabor Mate, Alfie Kohn and Aletha Solter, who claim that the approach may lead to short-term compliance but has the same disadvantages as other forms of punishment. According to these authors, the use of time-out does not enhance moral behavior or teach children useful conflict-resolution skills and it fails to address the underlying cause of the behavior. Furthermore, they claim that the parent/child bond can be damaged by forced isolation and withdrawal of love in an effort to control a child's behavior and this can lead to feelings of insecurity or anxiety in children, though there is no evidence that this occurs.

In addition to the potential psychological drawbacks resulting from the use of time-out, there also appears to be a risk to the child's developing brain, according to research in neuroscience by Daniel J. Siegel. "In a brain scan, relational pain (that caused by isolation during punishment) can look the same as physical abuse," and "Repeated experiences actually change the physical structure of the brain." The Society of Clinical Child and Adolescent Psychology issued a response to Siegel, arguing that his claims were "outrageous" and unsupported by research. Dr. Siegel later backed away from this statement and claimed that Time Magazine distorted his message. He clarified, "The 'appropriate' use of time-outs calls for brief, infrequent, previously explained breaks from an interaction used as part of a thought-out parenting strategy that is followed by positive feedback and connection with a parent. This seems not only reasonable, but it is an overall approach supported by the research as helpful for many children."

New "strong" positive parenting approaches suggest avoiding punishment in general, including time-outs. Advocates of strong positive parenting argue that children's misbehavior may be due to underlying issues rather than simple defiance, and punishing these behaviors will only lead to avoidance without fixing the underlying issue.

The Australian Association for Infant Mental Health has published a position statement in which the use of time-out is considered inappropriate for children under three years of age, and "needs to be carefully considered in relation to the individual child's experience and needs" for children past this age. They suggest the use of "time-in" instead, where children are taken away from the situation but not excluded from parent interaction.

The use of time-out needs to be carefully considered in families dealing with special challenges. In a review of parenting intervention programs for drug-abusing mothers, researchers found that programs emphasizing behavioral approaches to discipline (such as the use of time-out and rewards) "were not successful in fostering measurable improvement in mother-child interactions or promoting child development." An attachment-based approach focusing on strengthening the parent/child relationship was found to be more successful than behavioral approaches in changing children's behavior in these families.

Other studies have found that the traditional behavioral approach to discipline (such as the use of time-out and rewards) can be challenging with children in foster care with attachment disorders resulting from early abuse or neglect. Foster parents benefit from training that addresses these children's attachment and emotional issues, as well as traditional parenting techniques.

Time-out has been misused to the point of becoming abusive in some schools and so proper training for educational professionals is important. There are reported cases of children being locked in closets for extended periods of solitary confinement for behaviors such as crying or failing to finish an assignment. These are not examples of appropriate use of time-out.

== See also ==
- Behavior management
- Child discipline
