= Deaths in March 1988 =

The following is a list of notable deaths in March 1988.

Entries for each day are listed alphabetically by surname. A typical entry lists information in the following sequence:

- Name, age, country of citizenship at birth, subsequent country of citizenship (if applicable), reason for notability, cause of death (if known), and reference.

== March 1988 ==
=== 1 ===
- Joe Besser, 80, American actor and comedian (The Three Stooges, The Joey Bishop Show), heart failure.
- Ernest Cuneo, 82, American newspaperman (McClure Newspaper Syndicate, The Saturday Evening Post) and NFL footballer (Brooklyn Dodgers), heart attack.
- Sohan Lal Dwivedi, 82, Indian poet.
- Yoshi Katō, 75, Japanese stage and film actor.
- Luis Márquez, 62, Puerto Rican baseball player (Homestead Grays, Chicago Cubs, Pittsburgh Pirates).
- Tommy Potter, 69, American jazz double bassist.
- Jean Le Poulain, 63, French stage actor and director, heart attack.
- Carl Raguse, 85, American Olympic equestrian (1936).
- Ed Roman, 57, American college basketballer, convicted of point shaving, leukemia.
- Kay Sutton, 72, American actress.
- Benjamin F. Wilson, 66, American soldier in the US army, Medal of Honor recipient.

=== 2 ===
- Chuck Arnett, 60, American artist and dancer, AIDS.
- Tommy Breen, 75, Irish international footballer (Manchester United, Ireland).
- Raymond Hewitt, 47, American civil rights activist, leader of the Black Panther Party, heart attack.
- Kate Mahaut, 80, Danish Olympic fencer (1948, 1952).
- J. Saunders Redding, 81, American professor and author, heart failure.
- Ronald Senior, 83, British Army officer.
- Leslie Turner, 88, American cartoonist and writer (Captain Easy).

=== 3 ===
- Harold Langley, 84, British Olympic jumper (1924).
- Peter D. Martin, 65, American college professor and founder of City Lights Bookstore, emphysema.
- Wollert Nygren, 81, Norwegian Olympic speed skater (1928).
- Henryk Szeryng, 69, Polish-Mexican violinist, cerebral hemorrhage.
- Lois Wilson, 93, American silent-screen actress (The Covered Wagon, The Great Gatsby), pneumonia.
- Sewall Wright, 98, American geneticist (population genetics), complications of hip fracture.

=== 4 ===
- Ernesto Duarte Brito, 65, Cuban-Spanish musician.
- James Peter Davis, 83, American Roman Catholic prelate, Archbishop of San Juan and of Santa Fe.
- Beatriz Guido, 65, Argentinian novelist and screenwriter (The Kidnapper, Traitors of San Angel).
- Olavi Latsa, 58, Finnish Olympic cross-country skier (1956).
- Parry Moon, 90, American electrical engineer and author.
- Franco Scalamandré, 89, Italian-American textile designer, co-founder of Scalamandré Inc.

=== 5 ===
- Hyliard Chappell, 71, Canadian politician, member of the House of Commons of Canada (1968–1972).
- Lewis J. Fields, 78, American general in U.S. Marine Corps.
- Alfred Hollings, 81, New Zealand lawyer and cricketer (Wellington).
- Rupert Horsley, 82, English cricketer and teacher.
- Margaret Irving, 90, American actress (The People's Choice, Animal Crackers).
- Eddie Kolar, 78, American basketball player.
- William L. Marbury Jr., 86, American lawyer at Marbury, Miller & Evans, heart attack.
- János Németh, 81, Hungarian Olympic water polo player (1932, 1936).
- Alberto Olmedo, 54, Argentine comedian and actor, fall from building.

=== 6 ===
- Jeanne Aubert, 88, French singer and actress.
- Eric Crompton, 74, Australian rules footballer.
- Mairéad Farrell, 31, member of Provisional Irish Republican Army, shot by British army.
- Joan Hassall, 82, English wood engraver and book illustrator.
- Buster Henderson, 76–77, West Indian cricket umpire.
- Lou Legett, 86, American MLB player (Boston Braves, Boston Red Sox).
- Daniel McCann, 30, member of Provisional Irish Republican Army, shot by British army.
- Dick Ricketts, 54, American Major League baseball player (St. Louis Cardinals) and NBA basketballer (St. Louis Hawks), leukemia.
- Stanlake J. W. T. Samkange, 65–66, Zimbabwean writer of historical novels, heart and lung ailments.
- Seán Savage, 23, member of Provisional Irish Republican Army, shot by British army.

=== 7 ===
- Edmund Berkeley, 79, American computer scientist, co-founded the Association for Computing Machinery.
- Guido Celano, 83, Italian actor, voice actor and director.
- Divine, 42, American singer, actor and drag queen (Pink Flamingos, Hairspray), heart failure.
- Martin Finn, 70, Irish politician, member of the Dáil Éireann (1969–1977).
- Gordon Huntley, 62, British steel guitar player (Matthews Southern Comfort), cancer.
- Robert Livingston, 83, American film actor (The Three Mesquiteers, The Bold Caballero), emphysema.
- Joe Loco, 66, Puerto Rican Latin jazz and pop pianist and arranger.
- Youssef Abou Ouf, 63, Egyptian Olympic basketball player (1948, 1952).
- Rafael Quiñones Vidal, 95, Puerto Rican journalist.
- Olof Stahre, 78, Swedish Army officer and Olympic equestrian (1948, 1952).

=== 8 ===
- Bob Addison, 79, Australian rules footballer.
- Ray Bromley, 72, Australian rules footballer.
- Gordon Carpenter, 68, American basketballer and Olympic gold medalist (1948), national coach.
- Bruce Carruthers, 85, Australian rules footballer.
- Amar Singh Chamkila, 27, Indian singer and musician, murdered.
- Ken Colyer, 59, English jazz trumpeter and cornetist.
- Werner Hartmann, 76, German physicist (microelectronics), complications after prostate surgery.
- Katalin Hemrik, 46, Hungarian Olympic cross-country skier (1964).
- África de las Heras, 78, Spanish-born Soviet communist.
- Frank Osborne, 91, South African–born English international footballer and manager (Tottenham Hotspur, Fulham, England).
- Harold Pierce, 70, American entrepreneur, founded Harold's Chicken Shack restaurant chain, prostate cancer.
- Lala Abdul Rashid, 65, Pakistani hockey player and Olympic gold medalist (1960).
- Don Redden, 24, American basketballer, heart failure.
- Guy Tirolien, 71, Guadeloupean poet.

=== 9 ===
- Milton Galamison, 64, American Presbyterian minister, cancer.
- Béla Háray, 72, Hungarian Olympic field and ice hockey player (1936 Winter, 1936 Summer).
- John Joseph Harper, 36, Canadian aboriginal leader, shot by police.
- Harold Johnson, 81, Australian rugby league player and coach.
- Kurt Georg Kiesinger, 83, West German politician, Chancellor of West Germany, heart failure.
- Poondi Kumaraswamy, 57, Indian hydrologist (Kumaraswamy distribution).
- Janusz Piekałkiewicz, 62–63, Polish historian, writer and director.
- M. E. Aldrich Rope, 96, English stained-glass artist.
- M. B. Sreenivasan, 62, Indian music director, heart attack.

=== 10 ===
- Glenn Cunningham, 78, American middle-distance runner and Olympic medalist (1932, 1936), heart attack.
- Andy Gibb, 30, English singer and songwriter ("I Just Want to Be Your Everything", "Shadow Dancing"), myocarditis.
- Svetislav Glišović, 74, Yugoslavian international footballer and manager (BSK Beograd, Yugoslavia).
- Abdul Khaliq, 54, Pakistani sprinter and Olympian, "The Flying Bird of Asia".
- Hugh Lindsay, 34, English equerry to Queen Elizabeth II, killed in an avalanche.
- Kristian Madsen, 95, Danish Olympic gymnast (1920).
- Phạm Hùng, 75, Vietnamese politician, Prime Minister of the Socialist Republic of Vietnam, heart attack.
- Jock Semple, 84, Scottish-born American runner and sports official, cancer.
- Joey Sternaman, 88, American NFL footballer (Chicago Bears).
- William Wordsworth, 79, English composer.

=== 11 ===
- Rashid Bakr, 54, Sudanese politician, Prime Minister of Sudan.
- Jack Bedwell, 72, English cricketer.
- Christianna Brand, 80, British crime writer and children's author (Green for Danger).
- Harry Brauner, 80, Romanian composer.
- Lee Daney, 83, American MLB player (Philadelphia Athletics).
- Nicholas Eliot, 74, British peer, Earl of St Germans.
- Harold Gainger, 78, Australian rules footballer.
- Khurshid Hasan Khurshid, 64, Indian-Pakistani politician, President of Azad Kashmir, road accident.

=== 12 ===
- Samaresh Basu, 63, Indian writer (Prajapati).
- Alessandro Bausani, 66, Italian scholar of Islam and Middle Eastern studies.
- Romare Bearden, 76, American artist, author and songwriter, bone cancer.
- Arnold Bell, 86, British actor.
- DeWitt Bodeen, 79, American film screenwriter and television writer (Cat People).
- Albert Clark, 77, American Negro League baseball player.
- Vicky Longomba, 55, Congolese singer and founding member of TPOK Jazz.
- Frankie Martin, 80, Canadian Olympic boxer (1928).
- Margot Moe, 88, Norwegian Olympic figure skater (1920).
- Billie Rhodes, 93, American actress.
- Karen Steele, 56, American actress and model (Marty, Ride Lonesome), cancer.

=== 13 ===
- Olive Carey, 92, American film and television actress.
- Yngve Ekström, 74, Swedish furniture designer.
- Cees Groot, 55, Dutch footballer (Ajax).
- John Holmes, 43, American pornographic film actor, cardio-respiratory arrest.
- Patesko, 77, Brazilian international footballer (Palestra Itália, Nacional, Brazil).
- Xavier Saint-Macary, 39, French actor (Herbie Goes to Monte Carlo), heart attack.
- Pauli Sandström, 88, Finnish Olympic long jumper (1924).
- Steno, 71, Italian film director, screenwriter and cinematographer (Un giorno in pretura, Febbre da cavallo).
- Irving Younger, 55, American lawyer and writer, pancreatic cancer.

=== 14 ===
- Abbas Abbasi, 63, Pakistani hereditary leader, Nawab and Amir of Bahawalpur State.
- Willi Apel, 94, German-American musicologist and author (The Harvard Dictionary of Music).
- Bruno Balz, 85, German songwriter.
- Rudolf Gramlich, 79, SS officer and German international footballer (Eintracht Frankfurt, Germany).
- Ru den Hamer, 70, Dutch Olympic water polo player (1936).
- Johannes Pettersen Løkke, 93, Norwegian politician.
- Carter B. Magruder, 87, American general in the U.S. Army, lung ailments.
- Henrik Malyan, 62, Georgian-Armenian film director and writer (Nahapet).
- Zeb Terry, 96, American Major League baseball player (Chicago Cubs).
- Saul Weingeroff, 72, American professional wrestling manager.

=== 15 ===
- Lloyd Hudson Burke, 71, American district judge (United States District Court for the Northern District of California).
- Laura Caller, 72–73, Peruvian union lawyer.
- Jarmila Chalupová, 84, Czech Olympic fencer (1928).
- Amaro da Cunha, 75, Brazilian rower and Olympian (1932), brother of Carmen Miranda.
- Willie Darden, 54, American murderer, executed.
- Ivan Dubasov, 90, Soviet artist.
- Thord Flodqvist, 61, Swedish Olympic ice hockey player (1952).
- Chevene Bowers King, 64, American attorney and civil rights leader, prostate cancer.
- Henry N. Manney III, 65, American journalist known for writings on cars, motorcycles and travel.
- Edita Morris, 86, Swedish-American writer and political activist (The Flowers of Hiroshima).
- Frank Perkins, 79, American song composer ("Stars Fell on Alabama").
- Dmitri Polyakov, 66, Ukrainian-Soviet operative and spy for the United States, executed.
- William J. Porter, 73, British-born American diplomat, ambassador to Algeria, South Korea, Canada and Saudi Arabia, cancer.
- John Sloan, 83, American businessman, president of Cain-Sloan, heart attack.
- Victor Wickersham, 82, American politician, member of the U.S. House of Representatives (1941–1947, 1949–1957, 1961–1965).

=== 16 ===
- Dorothy Adams, 88, American actress (The Best Years of Our Lives).
- Nazir Dekhaiya, 67, Indian poet, bronchopneumonia.
- Rollie Dotsch, 75, American football coach (Birmingham Stallions), pancreatic cancer.
- Kurt Haverbeck, 89, German Olympic field hockey player (1928).
- Bizz Johnson, 80, American politician, member of the United States House of Representatives (1959–1981).
- Paul Kohner, 85, Austro-Hungarian–born American talent agent and producer, heart attack.
- Dan Laner, 65, Austrian-born Israeli general.
- Les Maskell, 70, Australian rules footballer.
- Erich Probst, 60, Austrian international footballer (Rapid Wien, Admira Wien, Austria).
- Dannie Richmond, 56, American jazz drummer, heart attack.
- Jigger Statz, 90, American Major League baseball player (Chicago Cubs).
- Frank Sutherland, 58, Australian rules footballer.
- Luther Merritt Swygert, 83, American circuit and district judge.
- Mickey Thompson, 59, American auto racing builder and promoter, murdered.

=== 17 ===
- Raffaele Arié, 67, Bulgarian bass.
- Nikolas Asimos, 38, Greek composer and singer.
- Bruce C. Clarke, 86, American general in the U.S. Army, stroke.
- Roland Drew, 87, American actor (Ramona, The Adventures of Tom Sawyer).
- Leif Granli, 78, Norwegian politician.
- Reg Halton, 71, English footballer and cricketer.
- Franz-Otto Krüger, 70, German film and television actor.
- Patrick Mphephu, 63–64, South African politician, president of Venda.
- Jaimal Singh Padda, 44–45, Indian poet and communist activist, shot by extremists.
- Yvette Boucher Rousseau, 71, Canadian politician, member of the Senate of Canada (1979–1988).
- Tan Siew Sin, 71, Malaysian politician, Minister of Finance, heart attack.

=== 18 ===
- Gerald Abraham, 84, English musicologist, editor and music critic.
- Billy Butterfield, 71, American jazz bandleader, cancer.
- Oliver Dawnay, 67, British civil servant, private secretary to Queen Elizabeth The Queen Mother.
- Karl Maria Demelhuber, 91, Nazi German SS general.
- Joan Field, 72, American violinist.
- Percy Thrower, 75, British gardener, horticulturist, broadcaster and writer.
- Frank Wayne, 70, American game show producer and host (The Price Is Right).

=== 19 ===
- Reyner Banham, 66, English architectural critic and writer, cancer.
- Sabino Barinaga, 65, Spanish footballer and manager (Real Madrid), heart disease.
- Philip Birnbaum, 83, American religious author and translator.
- Bun Cook, 84, Canadian ice hockey player and coach (New York Rangers).
- Suzy Frelinghuysen, (a.k.a. Suzy Morris), 76, American abstract painter and opera singer, stroke.
- Francisco Jardón, 76, Spanish Olympic field hockey player (1948).
- Máirtín Ó Direáin, 77, Irish poet.
- Sid Harkreader, 90, American fiddler and string band leader.
- Pamela Manson, 59, British actress.
- James Martin, 86, Scottish cricketer.

=== 20 ===
- Dick Bell, 74, Canadian politician, member of the Canadian Parliament, Minister of Citizenship and Immigration.
- Gil Evans, 75, Canadian-American jazz pianist, composer and bandleader, peritonitis.
- Winnie George, 74, Australian cricketer.
- Akhilbandhu Ghosh, 67, Indian Bengali singer.
- Donald Lawler, 65, Irish Olympic footballer (1948).
- Samuel W. Reynolds, 97, American politician, U.S. senator (1954), pneumonia.
- Greer Skousen, 71, Mexican basketballer and Olympian (1936).

=== 21 ===
- Virginia Axline, 76, American psychologist and author (Dibs in Search of Self, Play Therapy).
- Marie Burke, 93, English actress of stage, cinema and television.
- William Clark, 88, American Olympic boxer (1920).
- George W. Lehr, 51, American politician, State Auditor of Missouri, brain tumour.
- Robert McIntosh, 80, Indian-born English cricketer (Oxford University).
- Edd Roush, 94, American Major League baseball player (Cincinnati Reds).
- Charley Shipp, 74, American NBL and NBA basketballer and coach (Oshkosh All-Stars).
- Sigfrit Steiner, 81, Swiss actor.
- Patrick Steptoe, 74, English obstetrician and gynaecologist, pioneer of in-vitro fertilisation.

=== 22 ===
- Gudmund Harlem, 70, Norwegian politician, Minister of Defence and Social Affairs.
- Rudolf Matz, 86, Croatian composer.
- Kathleen Napoli McKenna, 90, Irish nationalist activist and journalist.
- Lester Rawlins, 63, American actor (A Man for All Seasons, The Old Glory), cardiac arrest.

=== 23 ===
- Theodore Fred Abel, 91, Soviet-born American sociology professor (Theodore Abel papers).
- Jack Austin, 88, British Olympic weightlifter (1924).
- John Charles Bolsinger, 30, American serial killer, suicide.
- Norm Calladine, 71, Canadian NHL player (Boston Bruins).
- Jimmy Jacobs, 58, American handball player, leukemia.
- Moody Jones, 79, American blues guitarist and singer.
- Isaiah L. Kenen, 83, Canadian-American journalist and lawyer, founder of the American Zionist Committee for Public Affairs.
- Dayton Lummis, 84, American actor (The Court-Martial of Billy Mitchell).
- Geoff McInnes, 79, Australian rules footballer.
- Pash, 37, Indian poet, murdered.
- Stephen Boleslav Roman, 66, Canadian mining engineer.

=== 24 ===
- Jan Epstein, 69, Australian cricketer.
- Pete Estes, 72, American automotive engineer, president of General Motors, heart attack.
- Anders Evensen, 73, Norwegian Olympic sailor (1948).
- Turhan Feyzioğlu, 65–66, Turkish academic and politician, Deputy Prime Minister of Turkey.
- Sirkazhi Govindarajan, 55, Indian singer, heart attack.
- Abdullahi Issa, 67, Somali politician, Prime Minister of Italian Somalia.

=== 25 ===
- Alick Black, 79, Australian rules footballer.
- Boniface Campbell, 92, American general.
- Earl Catherwood, 87, Canadian politician, member of the House of Commons of Canada (1949–1953).
- James J. Howard, 60, American politician, member of the U.S. House of Representatives (1965–1988), heart attack.
- Robert Joffrey, 57, American dancer and choreographer, co-founder of the Joffrey Ballet, organ failure.
- Leona Maricle, 82, American actress, heart attack.
- Vera Pagava, 81, Georgian artist.
- Al Schwartz, 77, American screenwriter and producer (The Red Skelton Show), brother of Sherwood Schwartz.

=== 26 ===
- Miguel Abuelo, 42, Argentinian rock musician and singer, cardiac arrest.
- Edward Boyce, 74, British and Northern Irish Olympic jumper (1936).
- Robert Fairbairn, 77, Scottish banker, chairman of Clydesdale Bank.
- Musa Kaleem, 67, American jazz saxophonist and flautist.
- Julian Pierce, 42, American lawyer and activist, murdered (body found on this date).

=== 27 ===
- Lee Guber, 67, American theatre producer, brain cancer.
- Gordon Merrick, 71, American Broadway actor and author, lung cancer.
- Fred Rose, 68, Australian rules footballer.
- Renato Salvatori, 55, Italian actor, liver cirrhosis.
- Charles Willeford, 69, American writer (Cockfighter), heart attack.

=== 28 ===
- David R. Bennion, 59, Californian winemaker, founder of Ridge Vineyards, car accident.
- Lloyd Bruce, 80, American Negro Leagues baseball player.
- Alan Crawford, 72, Australian rules footballer.
- Shu-tien Li, 88, Chinese-American hydraulic engineer.
- S. N. Tripathi, 75, Indian composer.
- Neil Williams, 53, American painter, heart attack.

=== 29 ===
- Arkady Bochkaryov, 57, Soviet Olympic basketball player (1956).
- Ted Kluszewski, 63, American Major League baseball player (Cincinnati Reds), heart attack.
- Sheila Manahan, 64, Irish actress (Only Two Can Play).
- Jacques Santi, 49, French actor and film producer (The Aeronauts).
- Dulcie September, 52, South African anti-Apartheid activist, assassinated.
- Clarence Gilbert Taylor, 89, American aviation entrepreneur, co-founder of the Taylor Brothers Aircraft Corporation.

=== 30 ===
- Ranulph Bacon, 81, British police officer, Inspector-General of Police of British Ceylon.
- Gardner Cox, 68, American Olympic sailor (1968).
- Jesús Díaz, 63, Mexican baseball player.
- Georgia Ellis, 71, American actress (Gunsmoke).
- Edgar Faure, 79, French politician, lawyer and historian, Prime Minister of France.
- John Clellon Holmes, 62, American author and poet (Go), cancer.
- Beulah Levy Ledner, 94, American pastry chef (Doberge cake).
- Jimmy McGuigan, 64, Scottish footballer and manager (Crewe Alexandra).
- Doris Pawn, 93, American silent-screen actress.
- Arnie Zane, 39, American photographer, choreographer and dancer, AIDS.

=== 31 ===
- Nicola Alexandrovich Benois, 86, Russian-born Italian stage designer (La Scala).
- Sir William McMahon, 80, Australian politician, Prime Minister of Australia, cancer.
- Gregers Münter, 80, Danish resistance member and Olympic sports shooter (1948).
- Eugeniusz Nowak, 92, Polish Olympic boxer (1924).
- Bolo Perdue, 71, American NFL player (New York Giants).
- Manuel Silos, 82, Filipino film-maker (Biyaya ng Lupa – Blessings of the Land).

=== Unknown date ===
- Harry Kane, 75, American illustrator (Three Investigators), aneurysm.
- Bernard Rudofsky, 82, Austrian-American writer and architect (Architecture Without Architects), cancer.
