= International Journal of Play =

- Discipline: Interdisciplinary
- Language: English

Publication details
- History: 2012-present
- Publisher: Taylor & Francis (United Kingdom)
- Frequency: Triannual
- Open access: no (limited)

Standard abbreviations
- ISO 4: Int. J. Play

Indexing
- ISSN: 2159-4937 (print); 2159-4937 (web)

Links
- Journal homepage; Online archive

The International Journal of Play (IJP) is a tri-annual peer-reviewed academic journal published by Taylor & Francis. IJP is co-edited by Michael Patte (Bloomsburg University of Pennsylvania), Fraser Brown (Leeds Beckett University), Anna Beresin (The University of the Arts), and Dr Sylwyn Guilbaud (book review editor).

== History ==
The International Journal of Play is the official journal of The Association for the Study of Play. The journal emerged from conversations between a professor of playful learning, Pat Broadhead (Leeds Metropolitan University), and Katie Peace at Taylor and Francis at an early-years education conference in the UK. Elizabeth Wood and David Whitebread joined the discussions along with Michael Patte (formerly president of The Association for the Study of Play), who was visiting Leeds on a Fulbright scholarship at the time. June Factor (University of Melbourne) joined shortly afterwards. The Association for the Study of Play (TASP) adopted the journal, supporting it through membership subscriptions. The first issue of the International Journal of Play was released in March 2012.

The International Journal of Play publishes research reports, theoretical reviews and position papers, policy critiques, essays, memoir, and book reviews. It has a section titled The State of Play, where playworkers, other practitioners, and scholars reflect on current perspectives and future possibilities, and Books Worth (Re)Reading, which explores classic and overlooked books about play.

== Abstracting and indexing ==
The journal is abstracted and indexed in the Australian Education Index (AEI) by the Australian Council for Educational Research.

== See also ==
- American Journal of Play
- International Journal of Play Therapy
- The Association for the Study of Play
