= International cricket in 1932 =

International cricket season

The 1932 International cricket season was from April 1932 to August 1932.

== Season overview ==
International tours
Start date	Home team	Away team	Results [Matches]			
Start date	Home team	Away team	Test	ODI	FC	LA
18 June 1932	Scotland	Ireland	—	—	0–1 [1]	—
25 June 1932	England	India	1–0 [1]	—	—	—
7 July 1932	Scotland	South Americans	—	—	1–0 [1]	—
27 July 1932	England	England Rest	—	—	0–0 [1]	—
6 August 1932	Netherlands	England	—	—	0–0 [1]	—

== June ==
=== Ireland in Scotland ===
Three-day Match
No.	Date	Home captain	Away captain	Venue	Result
Match	18–21 June	John Kerr	Thomas Dixon	Glenpark Cricket Ground, Greenock	Ireland by 58 runs

=== Indian in England ===
Test series
No.	Date	Home captain	Away captain	Venue	Result
Test 219	25–28 June	Douglas Jardine	C. K. Nayudu	Lord's, London	England by 158 runs

== July ==
=== South Americans in Scotland ===
Three-day Match
No.	Date	Home captain	Away captain	Venue	Result
Match	7–9 July	William Anderson	Clement Gibson	Raeburn Place, Edinburgh	Scotland by 8 wickets

=== Test Trial in England ===
Three-day match
No.	Date	Home captain	Away captain	Venue	Result
Match	2–5 June	Douglas Jardine	Bob Wyatt	Cardiff Arms Park, Cardiff	Match drawn

== August ==
=== England in Netherlands ===
Two-day match
No.	Date	Home captain	Away captain	Venue	Result
Match 1	6–7 August	Not mentioned	Not mentioned	De Diepput, The Hague	Match drawn
