= International cricket in 1936 =

International cricket season

The 1936 International cricket season was from April 1936 to August 1936.

== Season overview ==
International tours
Start date	Home team	Away team	Results [Matches]			
Start date	Home team	Away team	Test	ODI	FC	LA
20 June 1936	Scotland	Ireland	—	—	1–0 [1]	—
27 June 1936	England	India	2–0 [3]	—	—	—
27 July 1936	Netherlands	England	—	—	2–1 [3]	—

== June ==
=== Ireland in Scotland ===
Three-day Match
No.	Date	Home captain	Away captain	Venue	Result
Match	20–23 June	William Anderson	James MacDonald	Raeburn Place, Edinburgh	Scotland by 214 runs

=== India in England ===
Test series
No.	Date	Home captain	Away captain	Venue	Result
Test 252	27–30 June	Gubby Allen	Maharajkumar of Vizianagram	Lord's, London	England by 9 wickets
Test 253	25–28 July	Gubby Allen	Maharajkumar of Vizianagram	Old Trafford Cricket Ground, Manchester	Match drawn
Test 254	15–18 August	Gubby Allen	Maharajkumar of Vizianagram	Kennington Oval, London	England by 9 wickets

== July ==
=== England in Netherlands ===
Two-day match series
No.	Date	Home captain	Away captain	Venue	Result
Match 1	27–28 July	Not mentioned	A Stroink	Enschede	Free Foresters by 69 runs
Match 2	29–30 July	Not mentioned	Not mentioned	Laren	Free Foresters by 4 wickets
Match 3	1–2 August	Not mentioned	Not mentioned	Haarlem	Match drawn
