= Garry Landreth =

American psychotherapist (1937–2026)

Garry L. Landreth (1937–2026) was an American psychotherapist who specialized in play therapy.

== Biography ==
Garry Landreth was born on April 12, 1937 in Woodstown, Oklahoma. After graduating from Grant High School, he studied for his bachelor's degree at Southeastern Oklahoma State University in Durant. In 1958, Landreth began work as a school teacher in Albuquerque, New Mexico. He received an M.A. in counseling from the University of New Mexico (UNM) in 1962, and became a school counselor. He continued studying at UNM for his Ed.D. in counseling, which he received in 1966.

Landreth then moved to Denton, Texas, to start his academic career at the University of North Texas (UNT), where he retired as Regents Professor in the Department of Counseling and Higher Education in 2011. His research and practice were centered on play therapy and filial therapy; he was the founder of UNT's Center for Play Therapy, and director emeritus of the Association for Play Therapy.

Landreth died on June 11, 2026.

== Selected works ==
- Landreth, Garry, ed. (1982). Play therapy: dynamics of the process of counseling with children. Thomas. ISBN 0-398-04716-2.
- Landreth, Garry (1991). Play therapy: the art of the relationship. Accelerated Development. ISBN 1-55959-017-3.
- Landreth, Garry, ed. (2001). Innovations in play therapy: issues, process, and special populations. Brunner-Routledge. ISBN 1-56032-881-9.
- Landreth, Garry L.; Bratton, Sue C. (2006). Child Parent Relationship Therapy (CPRT): A 10-Session Filial Therapy Model. Routledge. ISBN 0-415-95110-0.
