= International cricket in 1933 =

International cricket season

The 1933 International cricket season was from April 1933 to August 1933.

== Season overview ==
International tours
Start date	Home team	Away team	Results [Matches]			
Start date	Home team	Away team	Test	ODI	FC	LA
17 June 1933	Ireland	Scotland	—	—	1–0 [1]	—
24 June 1933	England	West Indies	2–0 [3]	—	—	—
24 July 1933	Netherlands	Free Foresters	—	—	0–3 [3]	—
10 August 1933	Netherlands	Marylebone	—	—	1–1 [2]	—

== June ==
=== Scotland in Ireland ===
Three-day Match
No.	Date	Home captain	Away captain	Venue	Result
Match	20–23 June	Arthur Douglas	William Anderson	Ormeau, Belfast	Ireland by 23 runs

=== West Indies in England ===
Test series
No.	Date	Home captain	Away captain	Venue	Result
Test 227	24–27 June	Douglas Jardine	Jackie Grant	Lord's, London	England by an innings and 27 runs
Test 228	22–25 July	Douglas Jardine	Jackie Grant	Old Trafford Cricket Ground, Manchester	Match drawn
Test 229	12–15 August	Bob Wyatt	Jackie Grant	Kennington Oval, London	England by an innings and 17 runs

== July ==
=== Free Foresters in Netherlands ===
Two-day match series
No.	Date	Home captain	Away captain	Venue	Result
Match 1	31 Jul–1 August	Not mentioned	AC Johnston	De Diepput, The Hague	Free Foresters by an innings and 123 runs
Match 2	2–3 August	G Hamburger	AC Johnston	Laren	Free Foresters by 6 wickets
Match 3	5–6 August	Not mentioned	Not mentioned	Haarlem	Free Foresters by 3 wickets

== August ==
=== MCC in Netherlands ===
Two-day match series
No.	Date	Home captain	Away captain	Venue	Result
Match 1	10–11 August	Not mentioned	Not mentioned	Haarlem	M.C.C. by 177 runs
Match 2	12–13 August	Hugo van Manen	Not mentioned	De Diepput, The Hague	Netherlands by 9 wickets
