= Attachment Play =

Attachment Play is a term created by developmental psychologist, Aletha Solter and the title of one of her books. It is one aspect of her Aware Parenting approach. The term refers to nine specific kinds of parent/child play that can strengthen attachment, solve behavior problems, and help children recover from traumatic experiences. These forms of play incorporate many traditional play therapy techniques as well as some newer ones.

== Research basis ==
The forms of play are based on attachment theory, and their effectiveness is supported by research in child development, neurobiology, and psychotherapy. For example, nondirective child-centered play has been studied for decades and has been shown to help children become less aggressive. It can also help to reduce learning difficulties while increasing social competence. Symbolic play with specific props or themes is based on exposure therapy techniques and can help children overcome traumatic experiences.

Contingency play is an important activity in helping traumatized children feel empowered, and the therapeutic value of separation games such as peek-a-boo has been recognized for decades. Playful activities with body contact can strengthen parent/child attachment and meet children's need for touch, which reduces stress while stimulating growth and healing. Cooperative games and activities (with or without touch) are especially effective in fostering cooperative behavior in children.

Laughter is an important component of several of these forms of play. In addition to strengthening parent/child attachment, laughter can help reduce anxiety and strengthen the immune system., Nonsense play (humor based on exaggeration, mistakes, or general silliness) has been shown to decrease a child's anxiety during medical interventions. Power-reversal play (such as a pillow fight in which the adult lets the child “win”) also involves laughter and can help to strengthen attachment while reducing anger and aggressive behavior.

A controlled pilot study was conducted in Australia to evaluate the effectiveness of three kinds of Attachment Play in a brief parent education program. The researchers found that the program increased parents’ feelings of self-efficacy Another pilot study was done in Ireland to teach Attachment Play to social workers, who then trained parents to implement the approach with their children. The training helped parents engage playfully with children, strengthen attachment, enhance cooperation, reduce behavior problems, and avoid the use of punishment.
