= James Martin (Scottish cricketer) =

Scottish cricketer

Personal information
- Full name: James David Martin
- Born: 1 July 1901; Edinburgh, Midlothian, Scotland
- Died: 19 March 1988 (aged 86); Edinburgh, Midlothian, Scotland
- Batting: Right-handed

Domestic team information
- Years: Team
- 1926–1929: Scotland

Career statistics
Competition	First-class
Matches	3
Runs scored	101
Batting average	25.25
100s/50s	–/1
Top score	88
Catches/stumpings	1/–
- Source: Cricinfo, 13 July 2022

James David Martin (1 July 1901 — 19 March 1988) was a Scottish first-class cricketer and administrator.

Martin was born in July 1901 in Edinburgh and was educated there at George Watson's College. A club cricketer for Watsonians Cricket Club, he made his debut for Scotland in first-class cricket against Ireland at Greenock in 1926. He made two further appearances in first-class cricket for Scotland in 1929, against Ireland at Dublin and the touring South Africans at Perth. Playing on the Scottish side as a batsman, he scored 101 runs at an average of 25.25; he made one half-century, a score of 88 against Ireland in 1929. Martin later served as the president of the Scottish Cricket Union in 1947, succeeding William Anderson. Outside of cricket, he was a grain merchant by profession. Martin died in Edinburgh in March 1988.
