= Charles E. Schaefer =

American psychologist (1933–2020)

Charles E. Schaefer (November 15, 1933 – September 19, 2020) was an American psychologist considered by many to be the "Father of Play Therapy" who has appeared on The Oprah Winfrey Show, The Today Show and Good Morning America. He was Professor of Psychology and was Director of both the Center for Psychological Services and the Crying Baby Clinic at Fairleigh Dickinson University in Teaneck, New Jersey.

Schaefer was the co-founder and director emeritus of the Association for Play Therapy in Fresno, California and the founder and co-director of the Play Therapy Training Institute in Hightstown, New Jersey. Author of more than 50 books, Child Magazine named Schaefer's book Raising Baby Right, (Crown Publisher, 1992) as its 1992 Book of the Year.

The Association for Play Therapy honored Schaefer with the Play Therapy Lifetime Achievement Award in 2006 and the Distinguished Service Award in 1996. Fairleigh Dickinson University honored Dr. Schaefer with the Distinguished Faculty Award For Research & Scholarship in 1994. And Fairfield University honored Dr. Schaefer with the Alumni Professional Achievement Award in 1969.

== Education ==
Schaefer earned his Bachelor of Arts degree from Fairfield University in 1955 and his Doctorate degree in Clinical Psychology from Fordham University.
