= The Association for the Study of Play =

- Abbreviation: TASP
- Formation: April 14, 1973; 53 years ago
- Founded at: Minneapolis, Minnesota
- Type: non-profit association
- Purpose: to advance the critical study of play
- Website: www.studyofplay.org
- Formerly called: The Association for the Anthropological Study of Play

The Association for the Study of Play (TASP) is a multidisciplinary organization of scholars and practitioners in the field of play. The Association promotes the study of play, forges alliances with organizations advancing play, organizes yearly meetings to disseminate play research, and publishes a newsletter and monograph series.

== History ==
The Association for the Study of Play emerged from a meeting of scholars of play held in Minneapolis, Minnesota, on April 14, 1973. The meeting was organized and chaired by Alyce Taylor Cheska (1921–2012), who was Head of the Department of Women's Physical Education at the University of Illinois at Urbana–Champaign (then the University of Illinois) and an affiliate professor in the Department of Anthropology. The scholars who met there formed the Cultural Anthropology of Play Reprint Society. The next year, Michael Salter organized the first formal meeting of the new organization at the University of Western Ontario during the North American Society for Sport History (NASSH) convention. Participants renamed the organization "The Association for the Anthropological Study of Play" and elected B. Allan Tindall as president. In 1987, the organization changed its name to The Association for the Study of Play (TASP). The proceedings of the Association's first conference were published in The Anthropological Study of Play: Problems and Prospects, a collection edited by edited by David F. Lancy and B. Allan Tindall.

== Publications ==
The Association for the Study of Play publishes the quarterly TASP Newsletter, Play Review, (Note: A portion of the archive of past issues of Play Review, beginning with Volume 4, Number 2, is available here on The Association for the Study of Play website.) and the annual edited Play & Culture Studies Series (1998–present). The Play & Culture journal series (1988–1992) replaced TASP's yearly publication of conference proceedings in 1988. TASP's official journal is the International Journal of Play, published by Taylor & Francis.

== Meetings ==
TASP conducts holds a scholarly conference each year. These multidisciplinary meetings have been held in North America and Europe, and draw a range of scholars from the fields of anthropology, biology, communication studies, cultural studies, dance, ecology, education, ethology, folklore, history, kinesiology, leisure studies, musicology, philosophy, psychology, recreation, sociology, and the arts.

== See also ==
- Strong National Museum of Play
- Play (activity)
