= Filial therapy =

Filial therapy is a type of psychotherapy designed to treat emotional and behavioral difficulties in children; it was formulated by Bernard Guerney in 1964. It is based on the principles of play therapy; however, it is distinct from it, in that it teaches parents (or other paraprofessionals) how to provide therapeutic interventions for children. With respect to older children, filial therapy uses techniques that are adapted to age-appropriate interests and activities.

== Therapeutic mechanism ==
Although the exact mechanism by which therapeutic gains occur through the use of filial therapy is not definitively known, several hypotheses have been formulated to explain its positive effects. Many hypotheses hold that therapeutic gains are due to the same factors that make play therapy efficacious. Other hypotheses suggest that benefits from filial therapy may also stem from parental skill acquisition, a sense of parental self-efficacy, decreases in negative parent-child interactions, and an increase in positive parent-child interactions.

== Empirical support ==
Filial therapy is supported by clinical studies and meta-analyses. Some research suggests that under certain conditions, filial therapy can have a greater therapeutic impact than play therapy.

== See also ==
- Virginia Axline
