= Play therapy =

Children's mental health therapy method

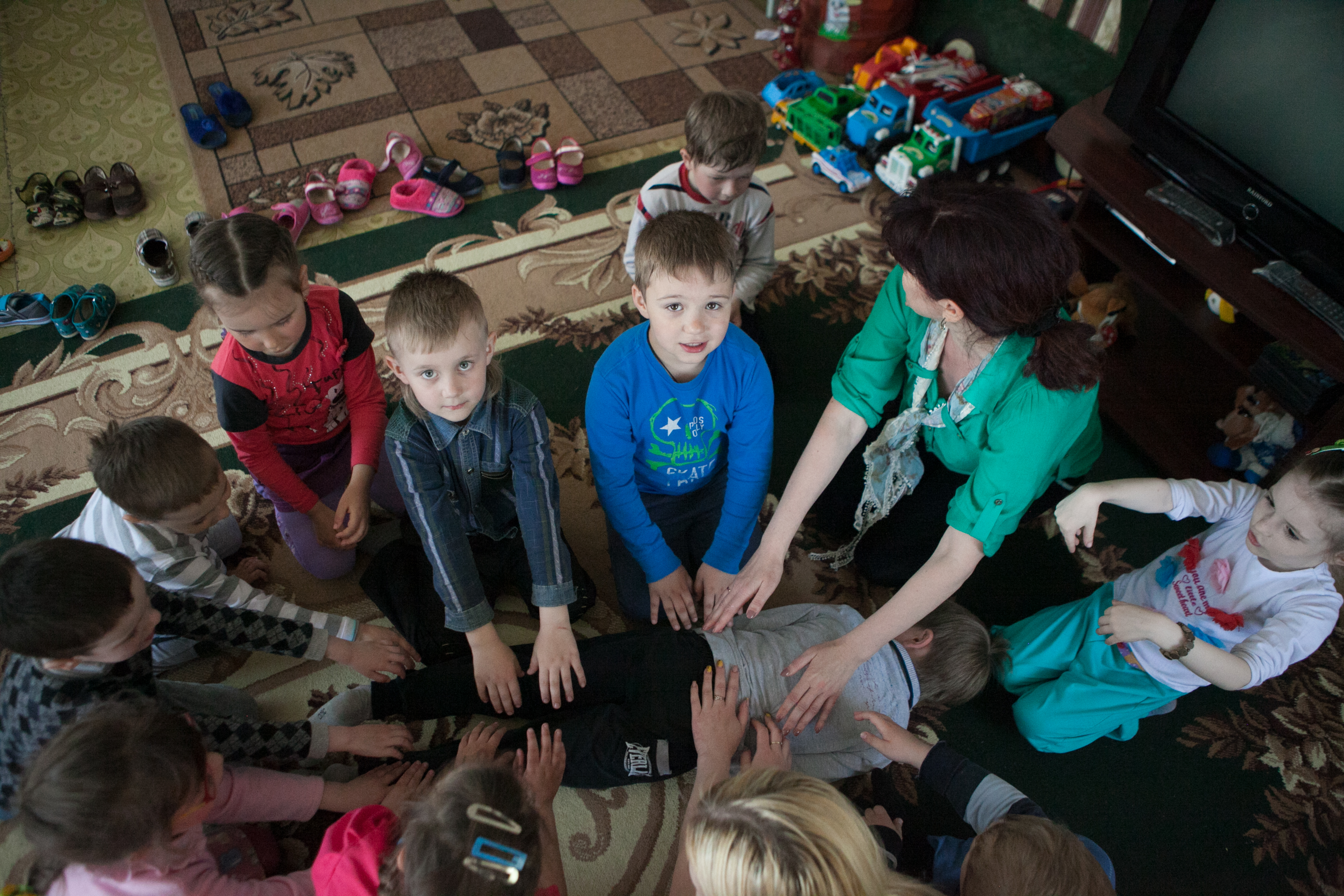
- Children playing during a session with a psychologist
- ICD-9-CM: 93.81, 94.36
- MeSH: D010989

Play therapy refers to a range of methods of capitalising on children's natural urge to explore and harnessing it to meet and respond to their developmental and mental health needs. It is also used for forensic or psychological assessment purposes where the individual is too young or too traumatised to give a verbal account of adverse, abusive or potentially criminal circumstances in their life.

Play therapy is widely used to support children's personal and interpersonal development, though its effectiveness relative to other interventions has been debated. Play and play therapy are generally employed with children aged six months through late adolescence and young adulthood. They provide contained ways to express experiences and feelings through an imaginative self-expressive process within a trusted relationship with a caregiver or therapist. As children's and young people's experiences and knowledge are typically communicated through play, it is an essential vehicle for personality and social development.

In recent years, play therapists in the Western Hemisphere, as a body of health professionals, are usually members or affiliates of professional training institutions and tend to be subject to codes of ethical practice.

== Play as therapy ==
Jean Piaget emphasised play as an essential expression of children's feelings, especially because they do not know how to communicate their feelings with words. Play helps a child develop a sense of true self and a mastery over their innate abilities, resulting in a sense of worth and aptitude. Play contributes to the advancement of creative thinking and provides a way for children to release strong emotions. During play, children are driven to meet the essential need to explore and affect their environment, and may play out challenging life experiences by re-engineering them, thereby discharging emotional states, with the potential to integrate each experience back into stability and gain a greater sense of mastery.

== Overview ==
Play therapy is a form of psychotherapy which uses play as the main mode of communication, especially with children and people whose speech capacity may be compromised, to determine and overcome psychosocial challenges. It is aimed at helping patients towards better growth and development, social integration, decreased aggression, emotional modulation, social skill development, empathy, and trauma resolution. Play therapy also assists with sensorimotor development and coping skills.

Play therapy is an effective technique, regardless of age, gender, or the nature of the problem. When children do not know how to communicate their problems, they act out, which may look like misbehaviour in school, with friends or at home. Play therapy gives children a way to cope with difficult emotions and helps them find healthier solutions and coping mechanisms.

=== Diagnostic tool ===
Play therapy can also be used as a diagnostic tool. A play therapist observes a client playing with toys (play-houses, soft toys, dolls, etc.) to determine the cause of the disturbed behaviour. The objects and patterns of play, as well as the willingness to interact with the therapist, can be used to understand the underlying rationale for behaviour both inside and outside of therapy sessions. Caution, however, should be taken when using play therapy for assessment and/or diagnostic purposes.

According to the psychodynamic view, people (especially children) will engage in play behaviour to work through their interior anxieties. From this viewpoint, play therapy can serve as a self-regulating mechanism, as long as children are allowed time for free or unstructured play. However, some forms of therapy depart from non-directiveness in fantasy play and introduce varying amounts of direction during the therapy session.

An example of a more directive approach to play therapy, for example, can entail the use of a type of desensitisation or relearning therapy, to change troubling behaviours, either systematically or through a less structured approach. The hope is that, through the language of symbolic play, desensitisation may occur as a natural part of the therapeutic experience and lead to positive treatment outcomes.

== Origins ==
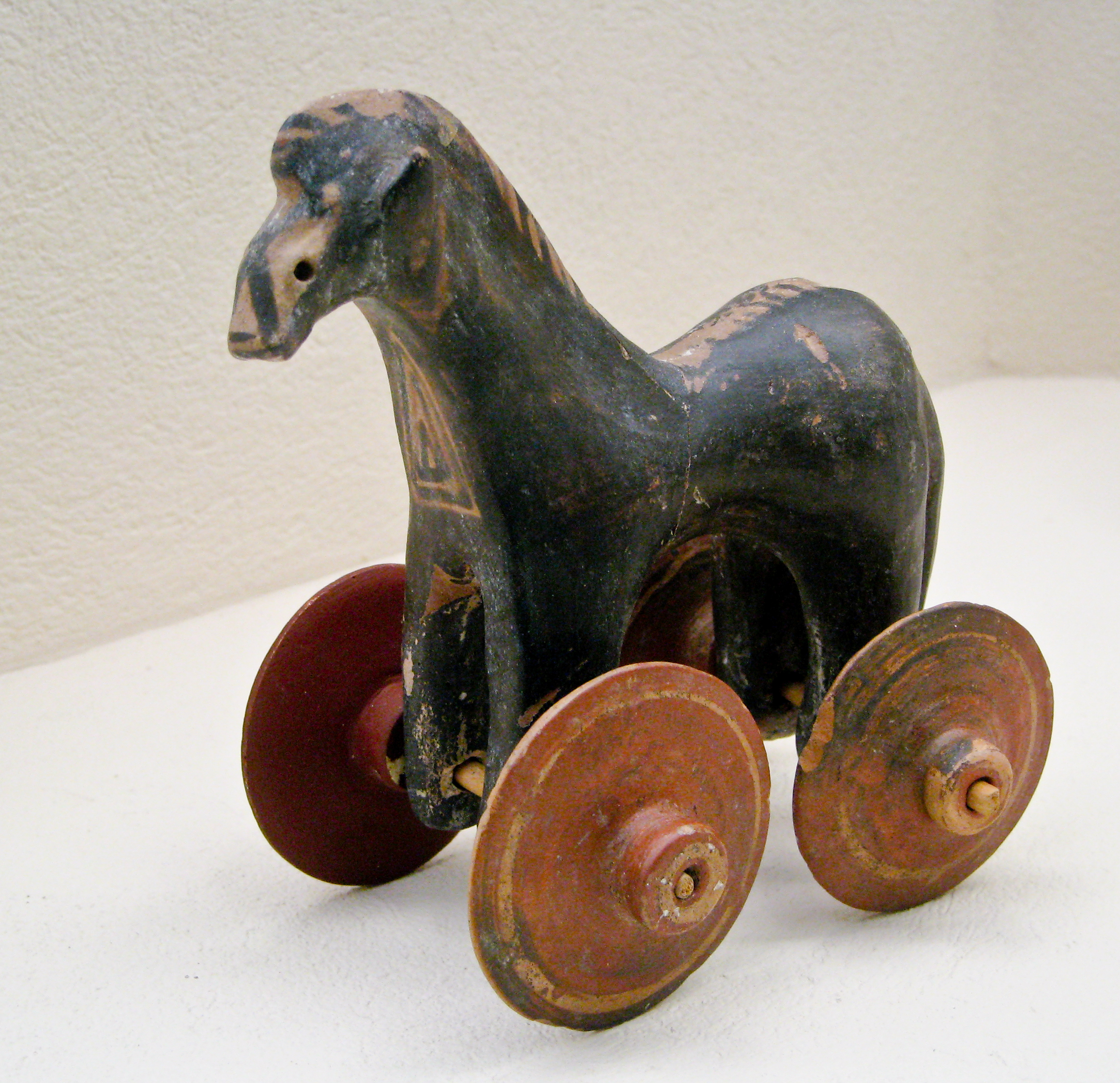
Little horse on wheels, Ancient Greek children's toy. From a tomb dating 950–900 BCE, Kerameikos Archaeological Museum, Athens

Children's play has been recorded in artefacts at least since antiquity. In eighteenth-century Europe, Rousseau wrote in his book Emile about the importance of observing play as a way to learn about and understand children.

=== From education to therapeutics ===
During the 19th century, European educationalists began to address play as an integral part of childhood education. They include Friedrich Fröbel, Rudolf Steiner, Maria Montessori, L. S. Vygotsky, Margaret Lowenfeld, and Hans Zulliger.

Hermine Hug-Hellmuth formalised play as therapy by providing children with toys to express themselves and observed play to analyse them. In 1919, Melanie Klein began to use play as a means of analysing children under the age of six. She believed that a child's play was essentially the same as the free association technique used with adults, and that as such, it provides access to the child's unconscious. Anna Freud (1946, 1965) used play as a means to facilitate an attachment to the therapist and supposedly gain access to the child's psyche.

Arguably the first documented case describing a proto-therapeutic use of play was Sigmund Freud's 1909 work with "Little Hans", a five-year-old child suffering from a horse phobia. Freud saw him once briefly and recommended his father take note of Hans' play to provide observations which might assist the child. The case of "Little Hans" was the first case where a child's difficulty was adduced to emotional factors.

== Models ==
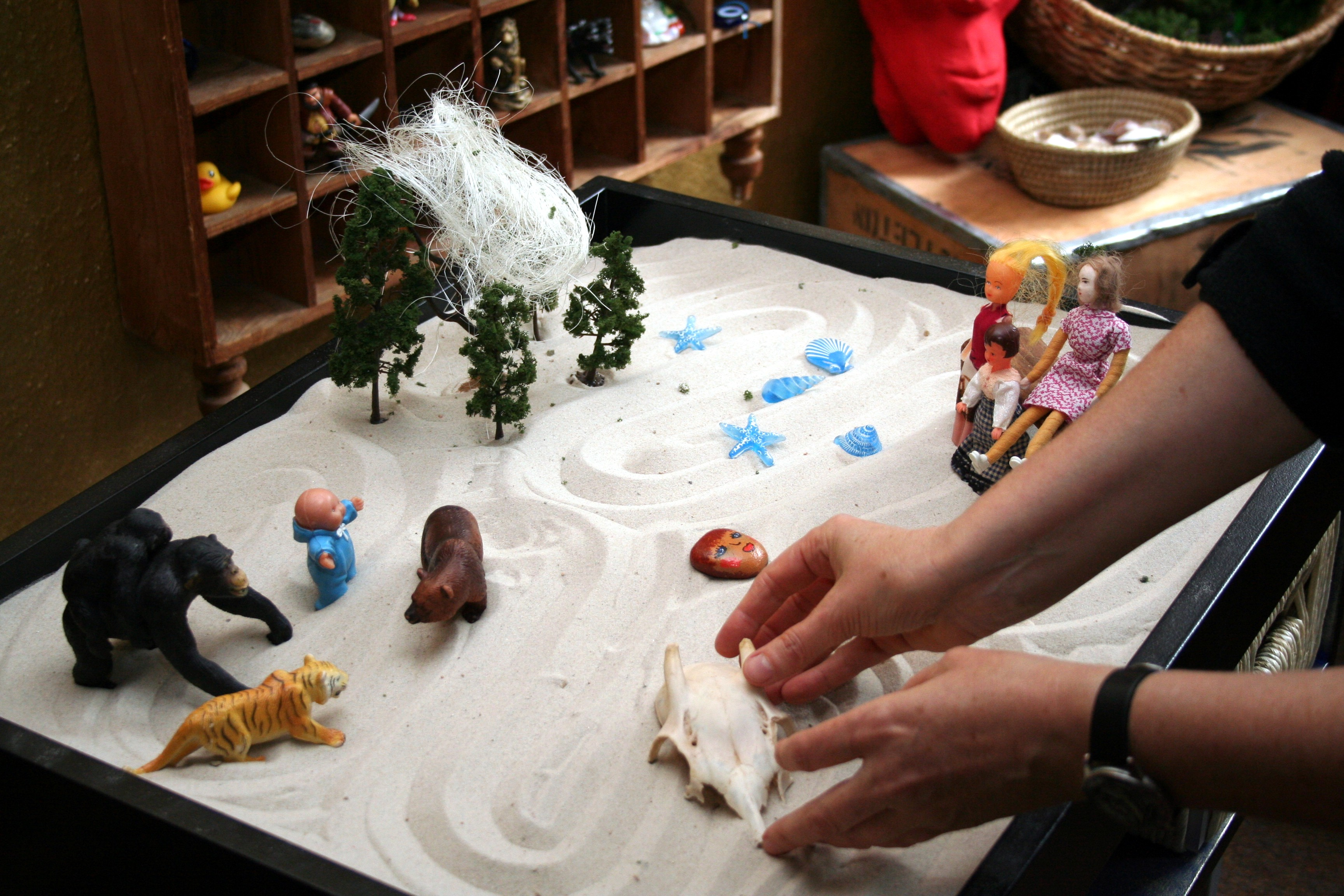
An individual engaging in sandplay therapy.

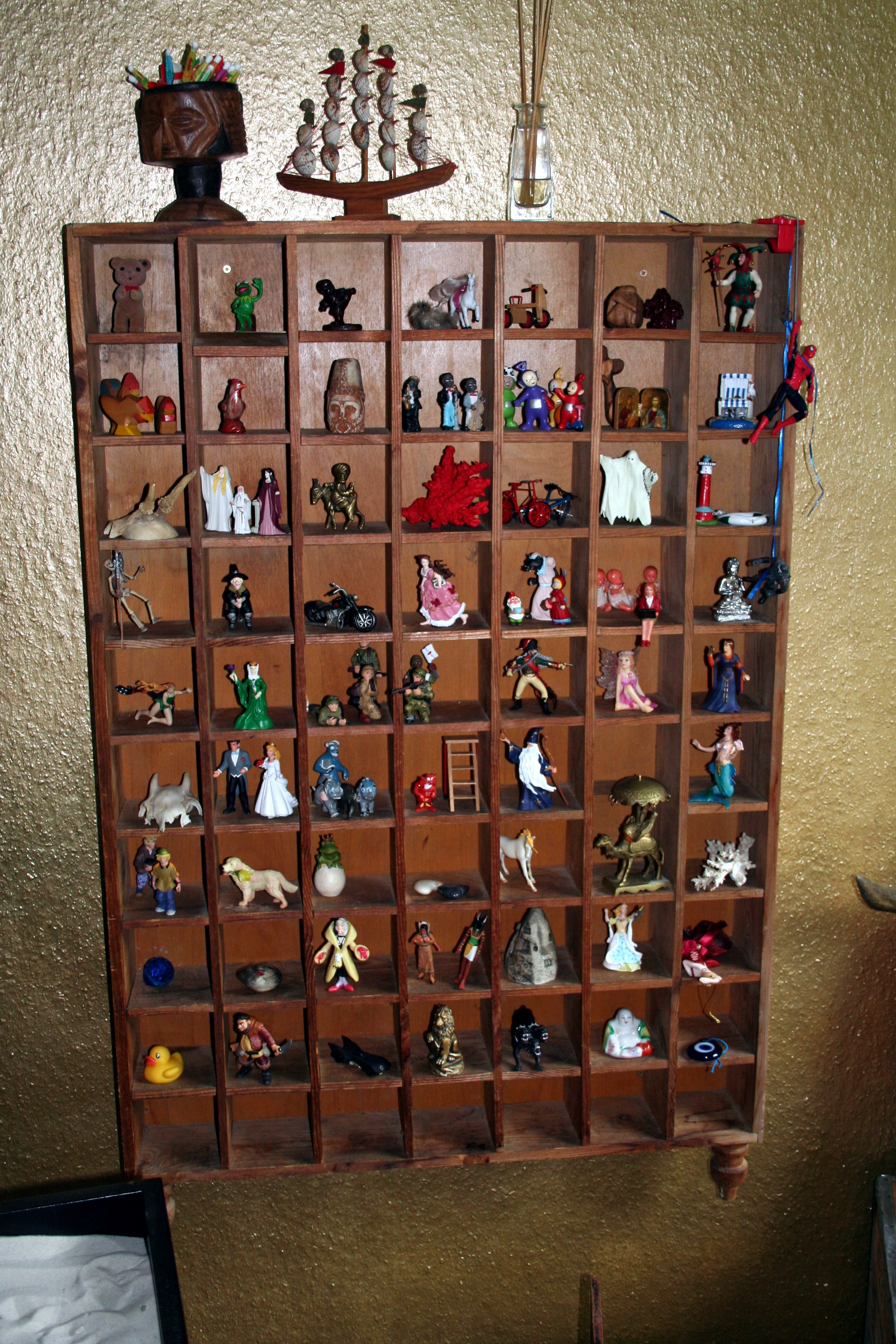
Equipment used for sandplay therapy.

H. G. Wells' Floor Games (1911) inspired Margaret Lowenfeld's play therapy

Play therapy can be divided into two basic types: non-directive and directive. Non-directive play therapy is a non-intrusive method in which children are encouraged to play in the expectation that this will alleviate their problems (as perceived by their care-givers and other adults). It is often classified as a psychodynamic therapy. In contrast, directive play therapy includes more structure and guidance from the therapist as children work through their emotional and behavioural difficulties through play. It often contains a behavioural component and the process includes more prompting by the therapist. Both types of play therapy have received at least some empirical support. A 2005 meta-analysis of 93 controlled studies found that, on average, children receiving play therapy improved by 0.80 standard deviations relative to control groups—a large treatment effect.

Jessie Taft (1933), (Otto Rank's American translator), and Frederick H. Allen (1934) developed an approach they entitled relationship therapy. In their method, the primary emphasis is placed on the emotional relationship between the therapist and the child, as well as the child's freedom and strength to choose.

Virginia Axline, a child therapist active in the 1950s, applied Carl Rogers' work to children. Rogers had explored the work of the therapist relationship and developed non-directive therapy, later called client-centred therapy. Axline summarised her concept of play therapy in her article, 'Entering the child's world via play experiences', where she described play as a therapeutic experience that allows the child to express themselves in their own way and time. That type of freedom allows adults and children to develop a secure relationship.(Progressive Education, 27, p. 68). Axline also wrote Dibs in Search of Self, which describes a series of play therapy sessions over a period of a year.

=== Non-directive ===
Non-directive play therapy may encompass child psychotherapy and unstructured play therapy. It is guided by the notion that if given the chance to speak and play freely in appropriate therapeutic conditions, troubled children and young people will be helped towards resolving their difficulties. Non-directive play therapy is generally regarded as mainly non-intrusive. The hallmark of non-directive play therapy is that it has minimal constraints apart from the frame and thus can be used at any age. These approaches to therapy may originate from child specialists Margaret Lowenfeld, Anna Freud, Donald Winnicott, Michael Fordham, Dora Kalff, or even from adult therapist Carl Rogers' non-directive psychotherapy and his characterisation of "the optimal therapeutic conditions". Virginia Axline adapted Carl Rogers's theories to child therapy in 1946 and is widely considered the founder of this therapy. Different techniques have since been established that fall under the realm of non-directive play therapy, including traditional sandplay therapy, play therapy using provided toys and Winnicott's squiggle and spatula games. Each of these forms is covered briefly below.

Using toys in non-directive play therapy with children is a method used by child psychotherapists and play therapists. These approaches are derived from the way toys were used in Anna Freud's theoretical orientation. The idea behind this method is that children will be better able to express their feelings toward themselves and their environment through play with toys than through verbalisation of their feelings. Through this experience children may be able to achieve catharsis, gain more stability and enjoyment in their emotions, and test their own reality. Popular toys used during therapy are animals, dolls, hand puppets, soft toys, crayons, and cars. Therapists have deemed such objects as more likely to open imaginative play or creative associations, both of which are important in expression.

==== Sandplay ====
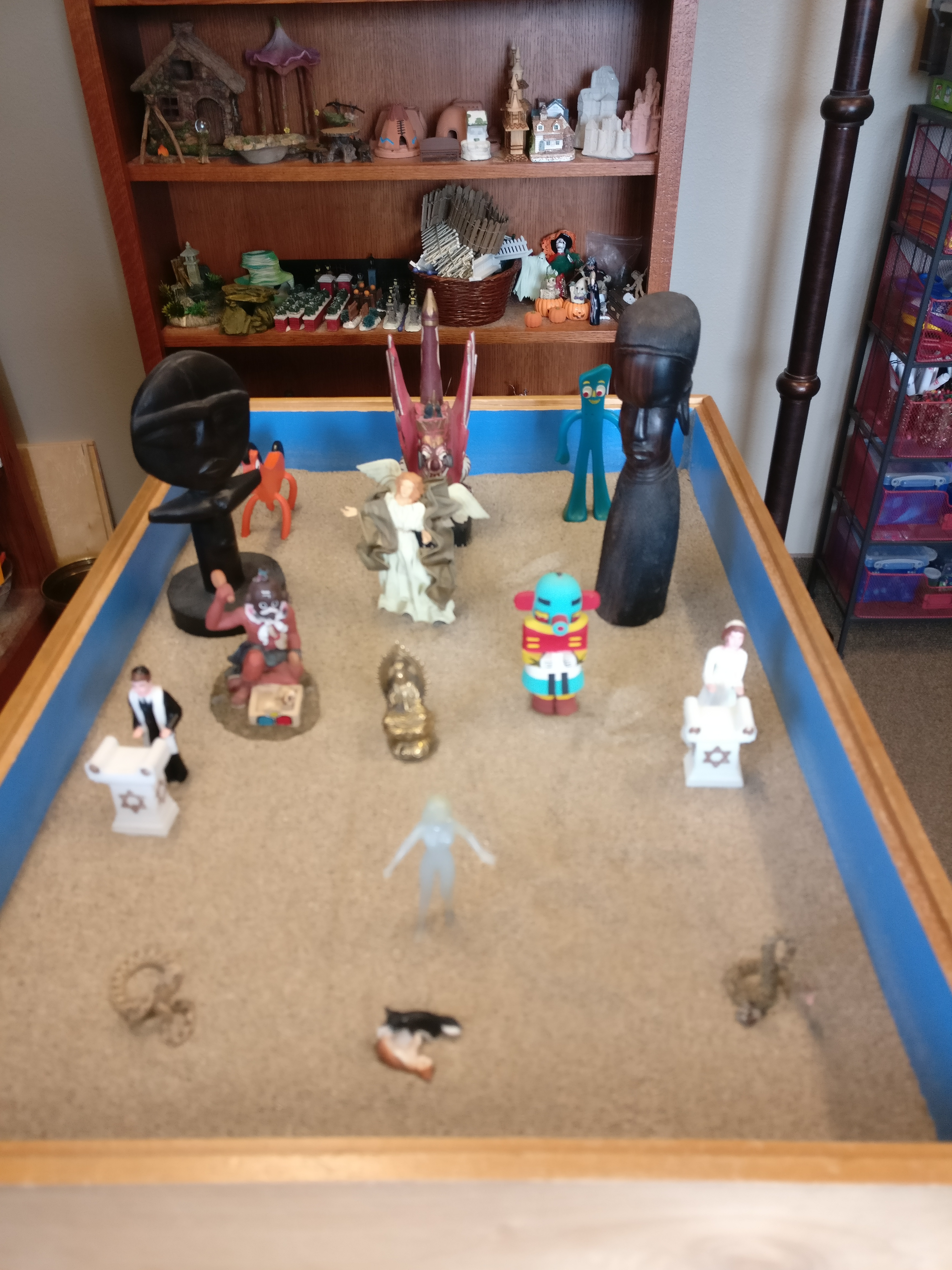
An adult example

The Jungian analytical method of psychotherapy using a tray of sand and miniature, symbolic figures is attributed to Dr. Margaret Lowenfeld, a paediatrician interested in child psychology who pioneered her World Technique in 1929, drawn from the writer H. G. Wells and his Floor Games published in 1911. Dora Kalff, who studied with her, combined Lowenfeld's World Technique with Carl Jung's idea of the collective unconscious and received Lowenfeld's permission to name her version of the work "sandplay". As in traditional non-directive play therapy, research has shown that allowing an individual to freely play with the sand and accompanying objects in the contained space of the sandtray (22.5 by 28.5 in (57 by 72 cm)) can facilitate a healing process, as the unconscious expresses itself in the sand and influences the player. When a client creates "scenes" in the sandtray, little instruction is provided and the therapist offers little or no talk during the process. This protocol emphasises the importance of holding what Kalff referred to as the "free and protected space" to allow the unconscious to express itself in symbolic, non-verbal play. Upon completion of a tray, the client may or may not choose to talk about their creation, and the therapist, without the use of directives and without touching the sandtray, may offer supportive response that does not include interpretation. The rationale is that the therapist trusts and respects the process by allowing the images in the tray to exert their influence without interference. Sandplay therapy can be used during individual sessions. The limitations presented by the boundaries of the sandtray can serve as physical and symbolic limitations to unconscious, symbolic material that can be further reflected in analytical dialogue. The International Society for Sandplay Therapy defines guidelines for training in sandplay therapy as well as guidelines for becoming a teaching therapist.

==== Winnicott's squiggle and spatula games ====
Donald Winnicott probably first came upon the central notion of play from his collaboration in World War II with the psychiatric social worker Clare Britton (later a psychoanalyst and his second wife), who in 1945 published an article on the importance of play for children. By "playing", he meant not only the ways that children of all ages play, but also the way adults "play" through making art or engaging in sports, hobbies, humour, meaningful conversation, etc. Winnicott believed that it was only in playing that people are entirely their true selves, so it followed that for psychoanalysis to be effective, it needed to serve as a mode of playing.

Two of the playing techniques Winnicott used in his work with children were the squiggle and spatula games. The first involved Winnicott drawing a shape for the child to play with and extend (or vice versa) – a practice extended by his followers into that of using partial interpretations as a 'squiggle' for a patient to make use of.

The second involved Winnicott placing a spatula (medical tongue depressor) within the child's reach for them to play with. Winnicott considered that babies will be automatically attracted to an object, reach for it, and then discover what they intend to do with it after a while. From the child's initial hesitation in making use of the spatula, Winnicott derived his idea of the necessary 'period of hesitation' in childhood (or analysis), which makes possible a true connection to the toy, interpretation or object presented for transference.

==== Efficacy ====
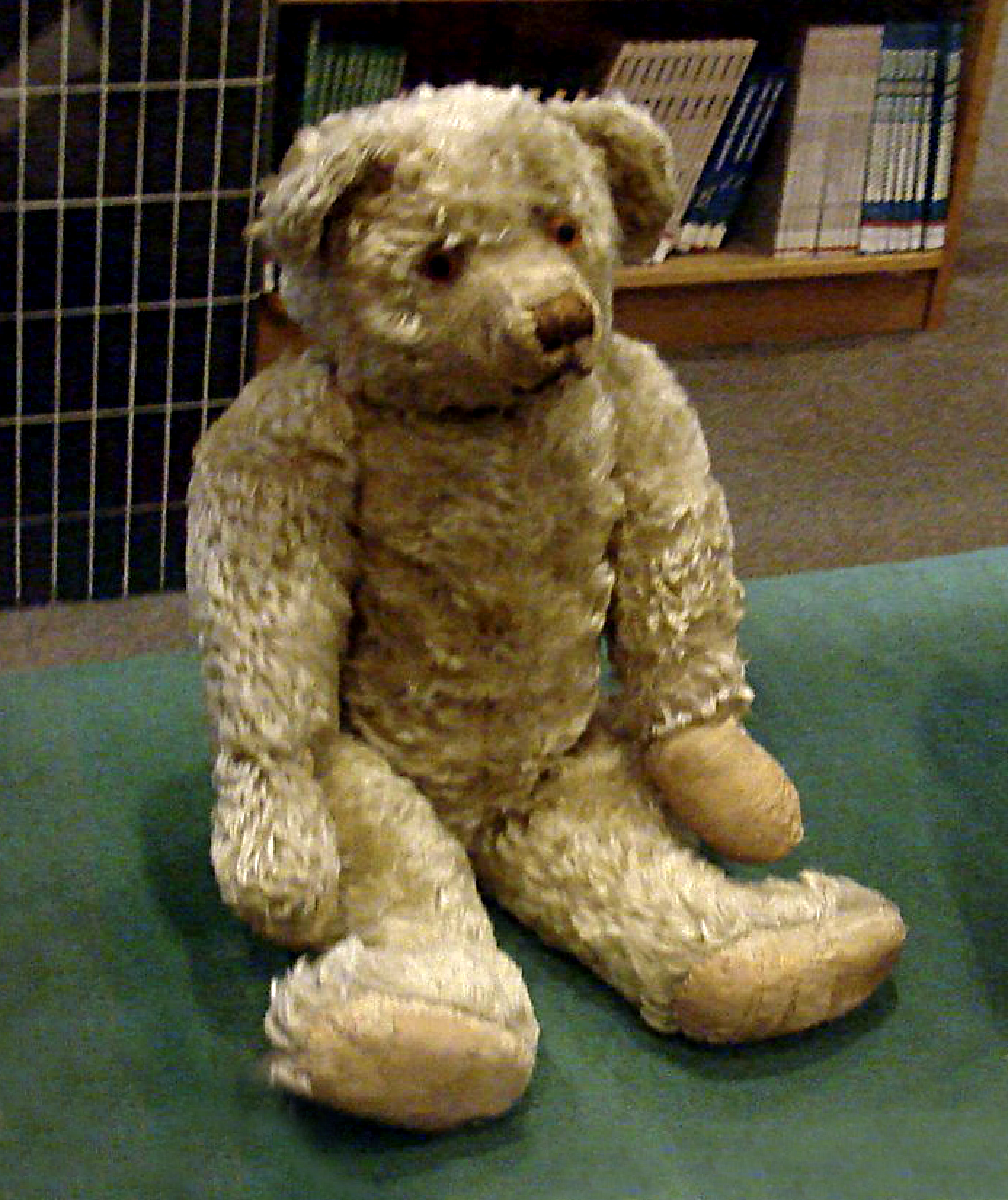
Winnie-The-Pooh, the original "Winnie", possibly Christopher Robin's transitional object

Winnicott came to consider that "Playing takes place in the potential space between the baby and the mother-figure [...] [T]he initiation of playing is associated with the life experience of the baby who has come to trust the mother figure". "Potential space" was Winnicott's term for a sense of an inviting and safe interpersonal field in which one can be spontaneously playful while at the same time connected to others. Playing can also be seen in the use of a transitional object, a term Winnicott coined for an object, such as a teddy bear, which may have a quality for a small child of being both real and made-up at the same time. Winnicott pointed out that no one demands that a toddler explain whether his Binky is a "real bear" or a creation of the child's own imagination, and went on to argue that it was very important that the child be allowed to experience the Binky as being in an undefined, "transitional" status between the child's imagination and the real world outside the child. For Winnicott, one of the most important and precarious stages of development was in the first three years of life, when an infant grows into a child with an increasingly separate sense of self in relation to a larger world of other people. In health, the child learns to bring his or her spontaneous, real self into play with others; whereas in a False self disorder, the child may find it unsafe or impossible to do so, and instead may feel compelled to hide the true self from other people, and pretend to be whatever they want instead. Playing with a transitional object can be an important early bridge "between self and other", which helps a child develop the capacity to be creative and genuine in relationships.

==== Research ====
Play therapy has been considered to be an established and popular mode of therapy for children for over sixty years. Critics of play therapy have questioned the effectiveness of the technique for use with children and have suggested using other interventions with greater empirical support such as cognitive behavioral therapy. They also argue that therapists focus more on the institution of play rather than the empirical literature when conducting therapy. Classically, Lebo argued against the efficacy of play therapy in 1953, and Phillips reiterated his argument again in 1985. Both claimed that play therapy lacks in several areas of hard research. Many studies included small sample sizes, which limits the generalisability, and many studies also only compared the effects of play therapy to a control group. Without a comparison to other therapies, it is difficult to determine if play therapy really is the most effective treatment. Recent play therapy researchers have worked to conduct more experimental studies with larger sample sizes, specific definitions and measures of treatment, and more direct comparisons.

Outside of the psychoanalytic child psychotherapy field, which is well annotated, research is comparatively lacking in other, or random applications, on the overall effectiveness of using toys in non-directive play therapy. Dell Lebo found that out of a sample of over 4,000 children, those who played with recommended toys vs. non-recommended or no toys during non-directive play therapy were no more likely to verbally express themselves to the therapist. Examples of recommended toys would be dolls or crayons, while example of non-recommended toys would be marbles or a checkers board game. There is also ongoing controversy in choosing toys for use in non-directive play therapy, with choices being largely made through intuition rather than through research. However, other research shows that following specific criteria when choosing toys in non-directive play therapy can make treatment more efficacious. Criteria for a desirable treatment toy include a toy that facilitates contact with the child, encourages catharsis, and lead to play that can be easily interpreted by a therapist.

Several meta analyses have shown promising results about the efficacy of non-directive play therapy. Meta analysis by authors LeBlanc and Ritchie, 2001, found an effect size of 0.66 for non-directive play therapy. This finding is comparable to the effect size of 0.71 found for psychotherapy used with children, indicating that both non-directive play and non-play therapies are almost equally effective in treating children with emotional difficulties. Meta analysis by authors Ray, Bratton, Rhine and Jones, 2001, found an even larger effect size for nondirective play therapy, with children performing at 0.93 standard deviations better than non-treatment groups. These results are stronger than previous meta-analytic results, which reported effect sizes of 0.71, 0.71, and 0.66. Meta analysis by authors Bratton, Ray, Rhine, and Jones, 2005, also found a large effect size of 0.92 for children being treated with non-directive play therapy. Results from all meta-analyses indicate that non-directive play therapy has been shown to be just as effective as psychotherapy used with children and even generates higher effect sizes in some studies.

==== Predictors of effectiveness ====
There are several predictors that may also influence how effective play therapy is with children. The number of sessions is a significant predictor in post-test outcomes, with more sessions being indicative of higher effect sizes. Positive effects can be seen with 16 sessions, however, there is a peak effect when a child can complete 35–40 sessions. An exception is children that undergo play therapy in critical-incident settings, such as hospitals and domestic violence shelters. Results from studies that looked at these children indicated a large positive effect size after only 7 sessions, which shows that children in crisis may respond more readily to treatment. Parental involvement is also a significant predictor of positive play therapy results. This involvement generally entails participation in each session with the therapist and the child. Parental involvement in play therapy sessions has also been shown to diminish stress in the parent-child relationship when kids are exhibiting both internal and external behaviour problems. Despite these predictors which have been shown to increase effect sizes, play therapy has been shown to be equally effective across age, gender, and individual vs. group settings.

==== Training in the US ====
Frequently counselors in the play therapy field address a number of obstacles when it comes to helping children. The vast majority of counselors starting off lack the basic knowledge needed to be an effective play therapist. Training for these counselors is done through many different methods, such as university counselor education programs and workshops, in hopes of meeting the various needs of the children. Different studies are also performed to further assess the progress of the counselor's skill set based on which type of training they pursued. Studies have shown that those that studied play therapy through the university level have displayed higher levels of skills, attitudes and knowledge. The children that need play therapy deal with many different disorders and behaviors and it is imperative that the therapist have these main skills in order for play therapy to be effective. Understanding the stages of child development and how play can help assist them with it is an important step to their learning process.

Play therapist requirements may differ from state to state, but generally, play therapists need a Master's degree or higher degree in a mental health related subject. They must also have demonstrated skills in the field of Child Development. After obtaining a degree, additional classes and work is needed to obtain a certification as a Registered Play Therapist (RPT). Additional work includes: 150 documented hours of instruction, specific to play therapy, a minimum of 350 direct client contact hours (under Supervision of someone who is a Registered Play Therapist Supervisor RPT-S), and 35 hours of direct supervision with 5 session observations.

=== Directive ===
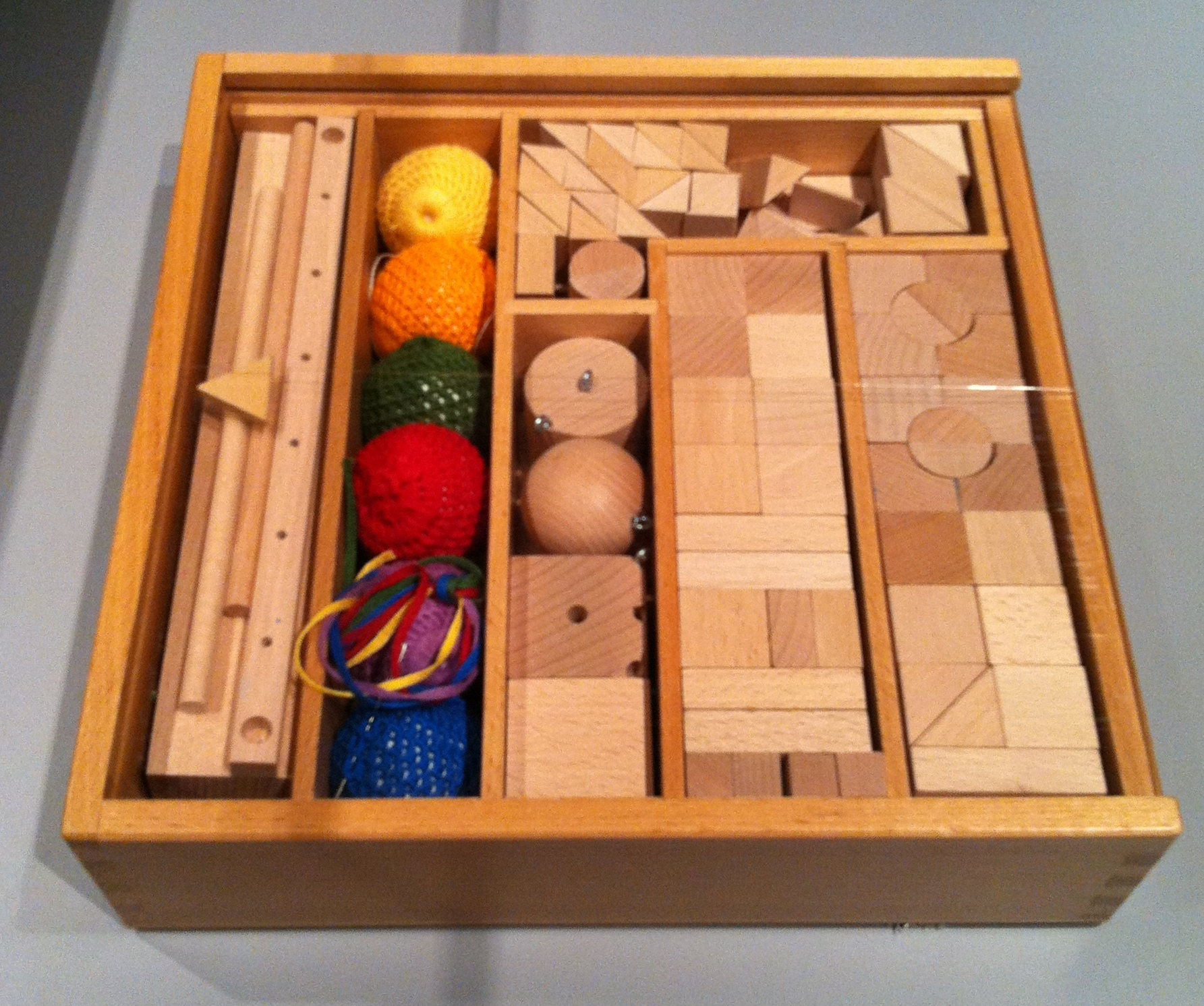
Friedrich Fröbel's wooden Construction kit, 1782–1852 SINA Facsimile

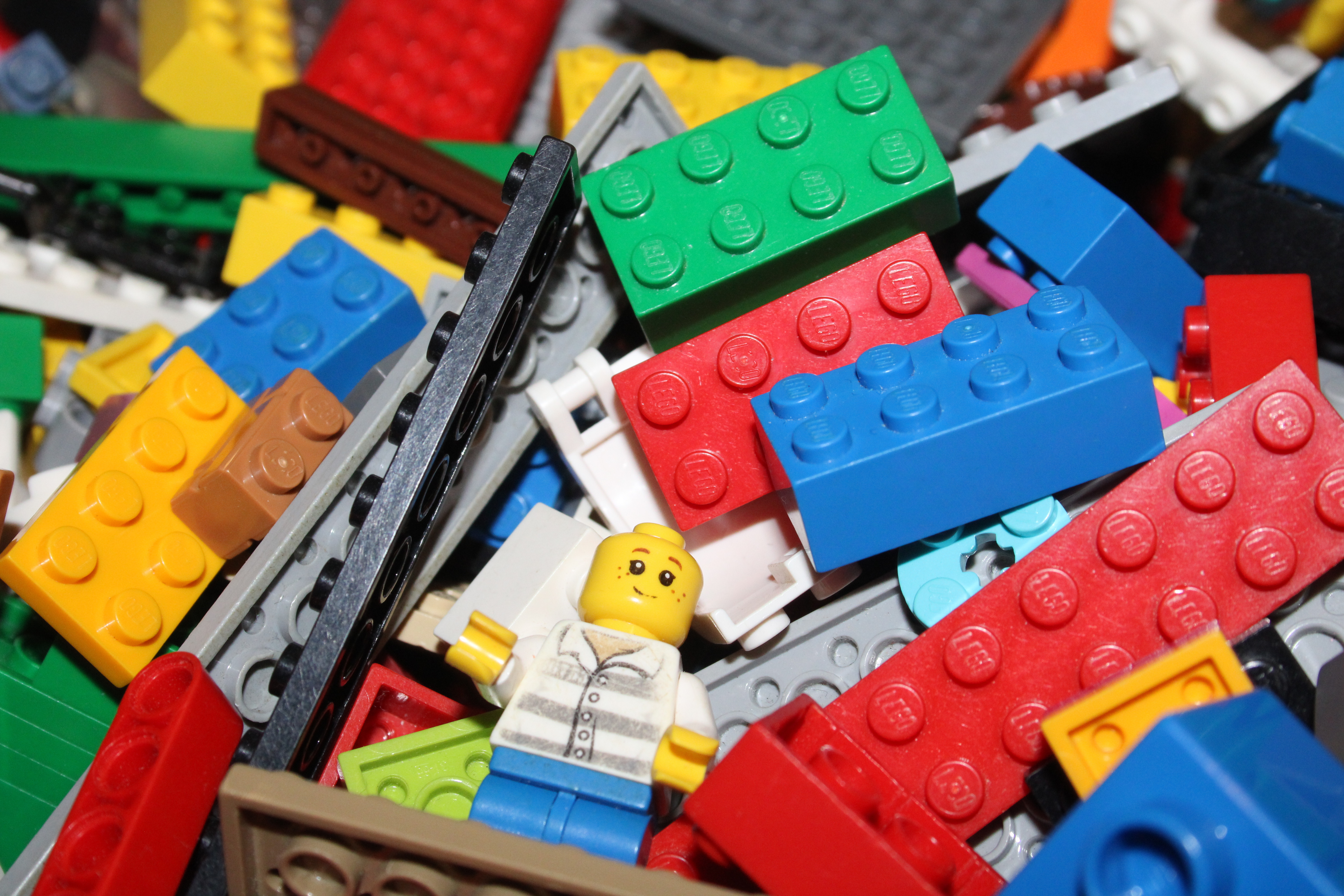
Plastic Lego Bricks

In the 1930s David Levy developed a technique he called release therapy. His technique emphasized a structured approach. A child, who had experienced a specific stressful situation, would be allowed to engage in free play. Subsequently, the therapist would introduce play materials related to the stress-evoking situation allowing the child to reenact the traumatic event and release the associated emotions.

In 1955, Gove Hambidge expanded on Levy's work emphasizing a "structured play therapy" model, which was more direct in introducing situations. The format of the approach was to establish rapport, recreate the stress-evoking situation, play out the situation and then free play to recover.

Directive play therapy is guided by the notion that using directives to guide the child through play will cause a faster change than is generated by nondirective play therapy. The therapist plays a much bigger role in directive play therapy. Therapists may use several techniques to engage the child, such as engaging in play with the child themselves or suggesting new topics instead of letting the child direct the conversation himself. Stories read by directive therapists are more likely to have an underlying purpose, and therapists are more likely to create interpretations of stories that children tell. In directive therapy games are generally chosen for the child, and children are given themes and character profiles when engaging in doll or puppet activities. This therapy still leaves room for free expression by the child, but it is more structured than nondirective play therapy. There are also different established techniques that are used in directive play therapy, including directed sandtray therapy and cognitive behavioral play therapy.

Directed sandtray therapy is more commonly used with trauma victims and involves the "talk" therapy to a much greater extent. Because trauma is often debilitating, directed sandplay therapy works to create change in the present, without the lengthy healing process often required in traditional sandplay therapy. This is why the role of the therapist is important in this approach. Therapists may ask clients questions about their sandtray, suggest them to change the sandtray, ask them to elaborate on why they chose particular objects to put in the tray, and on rare occasions, change the sandtray themselves. Use of directives by the therapist is very common. While traditional sandplay therapy is thought to work best in helping clients access troubling memories, directed sandtray therapy is used to help people manage their memories and the impact it has had on their lives.

Filial therapy, developed by Bernard and Louise Guerney, was an innovation in play therapy during the 1960s. The filial approach emphasizes a structured training program for parents in which they learn how to employ child-centered play sessions in the home. In the 1960s, with the advent of school counselors, school-based play therapy began a major shift from the private sector. Counselor-educators such as Alexander (1964); Landreth; Muro (1968); Myrick and Holdin (1971); Nelson (1966); and Waterland (1970) began to contribute significantly, especially in terms of using play therapy as both an educational and preventive tool in dealing with children's issues.

Roger Phillips, in the early 1980s, was one of the first to suggest that combining aspects of cognitive behavioral therapy with play interventions would be a good theory to investigate. Cognitive behavioral play therapy was then developed to be used with very young children between two and six years of age. It incorporates aspects of Aaron Beck's cognitive therapy with play therapy because children may not have the developed cognitive abilities necessary for participation in straight cognitive therapy. In this therapy, specific toys such as dolls and stuffed animals may be used to model particular cognitive strategies, such as effective coping mechanisms and problem-solving skills. Little emphasis is placed on the children's verbalizations in these interactions but rather on their actions and their play. Creating stories with the dolls and stuffed animals is a common method used by cognitive behavioral play therapists to change children's maladaptive thinking.

==== Efficacy ====
The efficacy of directive play therapy has been less established than that of nondirective play therapy, yet the numbers still indicate that this mode of play therapy is also effective. In 2001 meta analysis by authors Ray, Bratton, Rhine, and Jones, direct play therapy was found to have an effect size of .73 compared to the .93 effect size that nondirective play therapy was found to have. Similarly, in a 2005 meta analysis by authors Bratton, Ray, Rhine, and Jones, directive therapy had an effect size of 0.71, while nondirective play therapy had an effect size of 0.92. Although the effect sizes of directive therapy are statistically significantly lower than those of nondirective play therapy, they are still comparable to the effect sizes for psychotherapy used with children, demonstrated by Casey, Weisz, and LeBlanc. A potential reason for the difference in the effect size may be due to the number of studies that have been done on nondirective vs. directive play therapy. Approximately 73 studies in each meta analysis examined nondirective play therapy, while there were only 12 studies that looked at directive play therapy. Once more research is done on directive play therapy, there is potential that effect sizes between nondirective and directive play therapy will be more comparable.

=== Application of electronic games ===
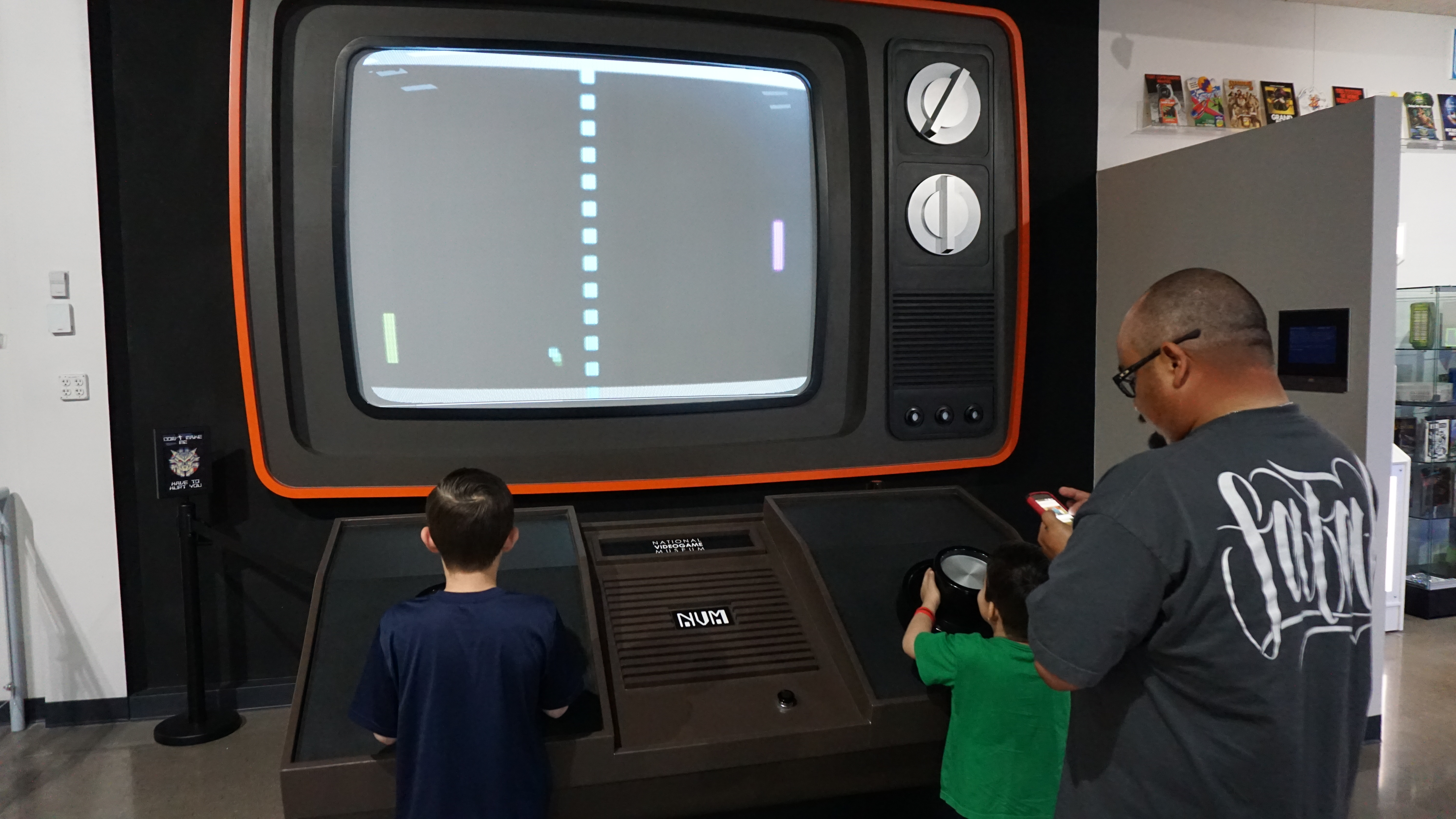
An early video game played by two children

The prevalence and popularity of video games in recent years has created a wealth of psychological studies centred around them. While the bulk of those studies have covered video game violence and addiction, some mental health practitioners in the West, are becoming interested in including such games as therapeutic tools. These are by definition "directive" tools since they are internally governed by algorithms. Since the introduction of electronic media into popular Western culture, the nature of games has become more diverse, complex, realistic and social. The commonalities between electronic and traditional play (such as providing a safe space to work through strong emotions) infer similar benefits. Video games have been broken into two categories: "serious" games, or games developed specifically for health or learning reasons, and "off-the-shelf" games, or games without a clinical focus that may be re-purposed for a clinical setting. Use of electronic games by clinicians is a new practice, and unknown risks as well as benefits may arise as the practice becomes more mainstream.

==== Research ====
Most of the current research relating to electronic games in therapeutic settings is focused on alleviating the symptoms of depression, primarily in adolescents. However, some games have been developed specifically for children with anxiety and attention deficit hyperactivity disorder (ADHD), The same company behind the latter intends to create electronic treatments for children on the autism spectrum, and those living with major depressive disorder, among other disorders. The favoured approach for mental health treatment is through cognitive behavioral therapy (CBT). While this method is effective, it is not without its limitations: for example, boredom with the material, patients forgetting or not practicing techniques outside of a session, or the accessibility of care. It is these areas that therapists hope to address through the use of electronic games. Preliminary research has been done with small groups, and the conclusions drawn warrant studying the issue in greater depth.

Role-playing games (RPGs) are the most common type of electronic game used as part of therapeutic interventions. These are games where players assume roles, and outcomes depend on the actions taken by the player in a virtual world. Psychologists are able to gain insights into the patient's capacity to create or experiment with an alternate identity. There are also those who underscore the ease in the treatment process since playing an RPG as a treatment situation is often experienced as an invitation to play, which makes the process safe and without risk of exposure or embarrassment. The most well-known and well-documented RPG-style game used in treatment is SPARX. Taking place in a fantasy world, SPARX users play through seven levels, each lasting about half an hour, and each level teaching a technique to overcome depressive thoughts and behaviours. Reviews of the study have found the game treatment comparable to CBT-only therapy. However one review noted that SPARX alone is not more effective than standard CBT treatment. There are also studies that found role-playing games, when combined with the Adlerian Play Therapy (AdPT) techniques, lead to increased psychosocial development. ReachOutCentral is geared toward youth and teens, providing gamified information on the intersection of thoughts, feelings, and behavior. An edition developed specifically to aid clinicians, ReachOutPro, offers more tools to increase patients' engagement.

==== Other applications ====
Biofeedback (sometimes known as applied psychophysiological feedback) media is more suited to treating a range of anxiety disorders. Biofeedback tools are able to measure heart rate, skin moisture, blood flow, and brain activity to ascertain stress levels, with a goal of teaching stress management and relaxation techniques. The development of electronic games using this equipment is still in its infancy, and thus few games are on the market. The Journey to Wild Divine's developers have asserted that their products are a tool, not a game, though the three instalments contain many game elements. Conversely, Freeze Framer's design is reminiscent of an Atari system. Three simplistic games are included in Freeze Framer's 2.0 model, using psychophysiological feedback as a controller. The effectiveness of both pieces of software saw significant changes in participants' depression levels. A biofeedback game initially designed to assist with anxiety symptoms, Relax to Win, was similarly found to have broader treatment applications. Extended Attention Span Training (EAST), developed by NASA to gauge the attention of pilots, was remodeled as an ADHD aid. Brain waves of participants were monitored during play of commercial video games available on PlayStation, and the difficulty of the games increased as participants' attention waned. The efficacy of this treatment is comparable to traditional ADHD intervention.

Several online-only or mobile games (Re-Mission, Personal Investigator, Treasure Hunt, and Play Attention) have been specifically noted for use in alleviating disorders other than those for anxiety and mood. Re-Mission 2 especially targets children, the game having been designed with the knowledge that today's western youth are immersed in digital media. Mobile applications for anxiety, depression, relaxation, and other areas of mental health are readily available in the Android Play Store and the Apple App Store. The proliferation of laptops, mobile phones, and tablets means one can access these apps at any time, in any place. Many of them are low-cost or even free, and the games do not need to be complex to be of benefit. Playing a three-minute game of Tetris has the potential to curb a number of cravings, a longer play time could reduce flashback symptoms from post-traumatic stress disorder, and an initial study found that a visual-spatial game such as Tetris or Candy Crush, when played closely following a traumatic event, could be used as a "therapeutic vaccine" to prevent future flashbacks.

==== Efficacy ====
While the field of allowing electronic media a place in a therapist's office is new, the equipment is not necessarily so. Most western children are familiar with modern PCs, consoles, and handheld devices even if the practitioner is not. An even more recent addition to interacting with a game environment is virtual reality (VR) equipment, which both adolescent and clinician might need to learn to use properly. The umbrella term for the preliminary studies done with VR is Virtual reality exposure therapy (VRET). This research is based on traditional exposure therapy and has been found to be more effective for participants than for those placed in a wait list control group, though not as effective as in-person treatments. One study tracked two groups – one group receiving a typical, lengthier treatment while the other was treated via shorter VRET sessions – and found that the effectiveness for VRET patients was significantly less at the six-month mark.

In the future, clinicians may look forward to using electronic media as a way to assess patients, as a motivational tool, and facilitate social in-person and virtual interactions. Current data, though limited, points toward combining traditional therapy methods with electronic media for the most effective treatment.

== In literature ==
In 1953 Clark Moustakas wrote his first book, Children in Play Therapy. In 1956 he compiled Publication of The Self, the result of the dialogues between Moustakas, Abraham Maslow, Carl Rogers, and others, forging the humanistic psychology movement. In 1973 Moustakas continued his journey into play therapy and published his novel The child's discovery of himself. Moustakas' work was concerned with the kind of relationship needed to make therapy a growth experience. His stages start with the child's feelings being generally negative and as they are expressed, they become less intense, the end results tend to be the emergence of more positive feelings and more balanced relationships.

Now, there are several published books outlining play therapy and specific techniques within play therapy. The Association for Play Therapy has a comprehensive list of play therapy books on their website. These books include 101 Play Therapy Techniques by Jason Aronson, A Handbook of Play Therapy with Aggressive Children by David E. Crenshaw, ADAPT: A Developmental Attachment-based, Play Therapy, by Jennifer Lefebre, and many others that outline Play Therapy and its use in specific circumstances.

== Parent/child ==
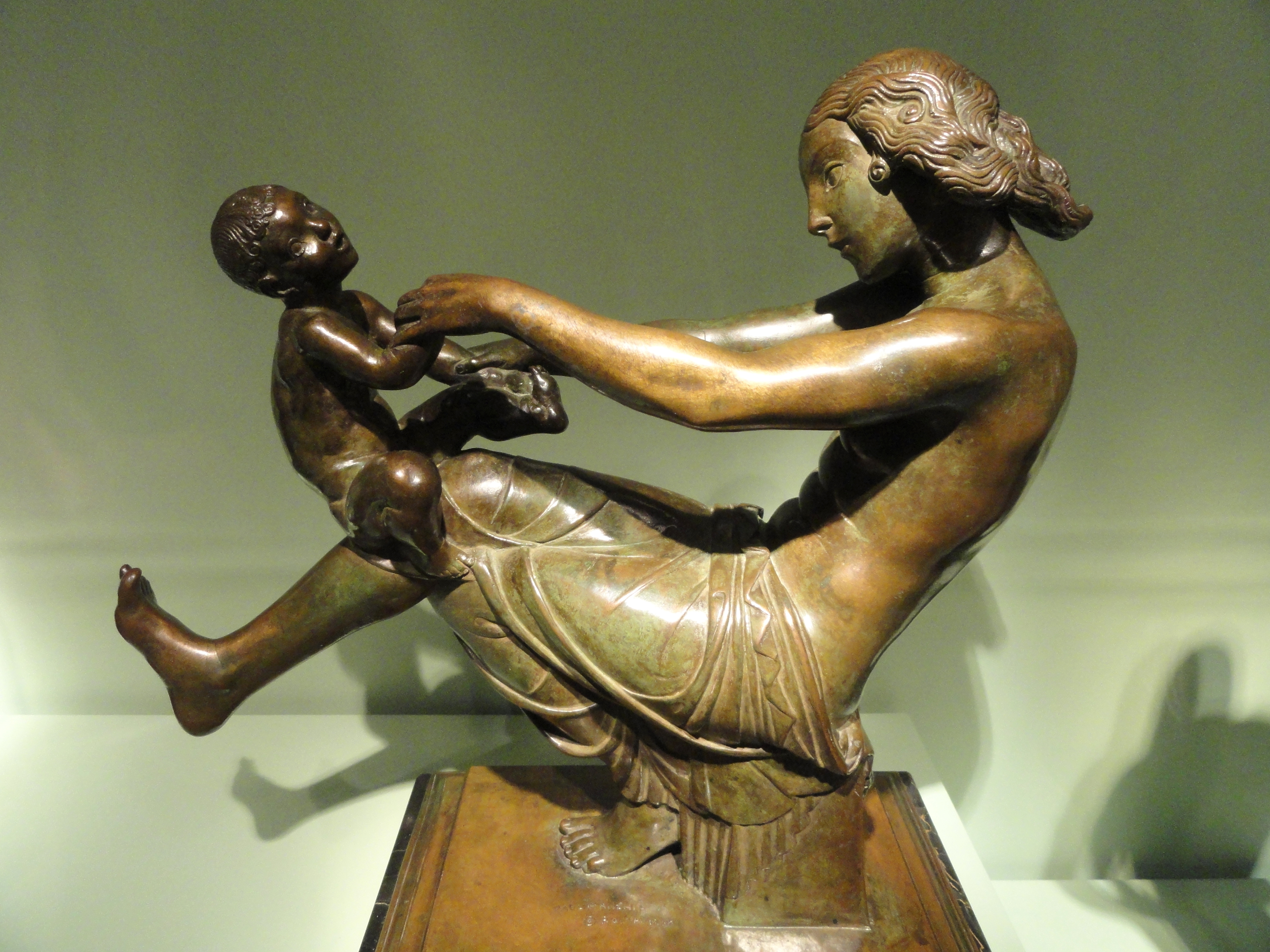
Playfulness by Paul Manship, 1912–1914

Training in nondirective play for parents has been shown to significantly reduce mental health problems in at-risk preschool children. One of the first parent/child play therapy approaches developed was Filial Therapy (in the 1960s - see History section above), in which parents are trained to facilitate nondirective play therapy sessions with their own children. Filial therapy has been shown to help children work through trauma and also resolve behavior problems.

Allowing children who struggle with trauma to use play therapy allows for them to work through their trauma and begin to trust beyond it. Adults that respond differently to the child's closed off and defensive behaviors will help children start to develop trust beyond their trauma. (Parker, Hergenrather, Smelser, & Kelly, 2021). When parents respond to children defensively, the child doesn't trust them due to their past trauma. Working with a child-centered play therapist allows for the therapist to engage with the child, convey messages, and is open with the child may express regarding their previous or current trauma. The therapist responds in an empathetic and understanding way to allow the child to become openminded and respond in an enjoyable way rather than a self-protective, defensive way.

Another approach to play therapy that involves parents is Theraplay, which was developed in the 1970s. At first, trained therapists worked with children, but Theraplay later evolved into an approach in which parents are trained to play with their children in specific ways at home. Theraplay is based on the idea that parents can improve their children's behavior and help them overcome emotional problems by engaging their children in forms of play that replicate the playful, attuned, and empathic interactions of a parent with an infant. Studies have shown that Theraplay is effective in changing children's behavior, especially for children suffering from attachment disorders.

In the 1980s, Stanley Greenspan developed Floortime, a comprehensive, play-based approach for parents and therapists to use with autistic children. There is evidence for the success of this program with children diagnosed with autism spectrum disorders. In a randomized controlled trial, Parsons and colleagues (2019) found that a play-based, peer-mediated intervention significantly improved pragmatic language skills in children with autism. The study demonstrated that structured play can enhance social and communication skills in children on the spectrum.

Lawrence J. Cohen has created an approach called Playful Parenting, in which he encourages parents to play with their children to help resolve emotional and behavioral issues. Parents are encouraged to connect playfully with their children through silliness, laughter, and roughhousing.

In 2006, Garry Landreth and Sue Bratton developed a highly researched and structured way of teaching parents to engage in therapeutic play with their children. It is based on a supervised entry-level training in child centred play therapy. They named it Child Parent Relationship Therapy. These 10 sessions focus on parenting issues in a group environment and utilises video and audio recordings to help the parents receive feedback on their 30-minute 'special play times' with their children.

More recently, Aletha Solter has developed a comprehensive approach for parents called Attachment Play, which describes evidence-based forms of play therapy, including non-directive play, more directive symbolic play, contingency play, and several laughter-producing activities. Parents are encouraged to use these playful activities to strengthen their connection with their children, resolve discipline issues, and also help the children work through traumatic experiences such as hospitalization or parental divorce.

The emotional bond formed between a caregiver and their child is called attachment. A child having attachment issues is significant because a child can have either a good or bad attachment to their primary caregiver, which can lead to developmental and behavioral issues as they age, depending on the type of attachment. When using play therapy for attachment issues it is essential to ease into it because the child may be emotionally isolated, and the therapy benefits both the parent and child by connecting them on a deeper level. It allows the parent and the child to build their relationship and the child to feel more secure with the parent.

Beyond emotional support, play therapy may also support academic outcomes. A small 2025 randomized controlled trial of Chinese boys aged 10 to 12 with learning disabilities found that parent-child play therapy improved their reading performance.

== See also ==
- Art therapy
- Drama therapy
- Eurythmy
- Music therapy
- Froebel gifts
- Eva Frommer
- Montessori education
- Charles E. Schaefer
- International Journal of Play Therapy
- The P.L.A.Y. Project
- Waldorf education
