= Eric Crompton =

Australian rules footballer, born 1913

Personal information
- Full name: Eric Crompton
- Born: 11 May 1913
- Died: 6 March 1988 (aged 74)
- Original team: Ballarat

Playing career^{1}
Years	Club	Games (Goals)
1935	Footscray	1 (0)
- ^{1} Playing statistics correct to the end of 1935.

Eric Crompton (11 May 1913 – 6 March 1988) was a former Australian rules footballer who played with Footscray in the Victorian Football League (VFL).
