= Les Maskell =

Australian rules footballer, born 1917

Personal information
- Full name: Leslie Alan Maskell
- Born: 4 November 1917; Tatura, Victoria
- Died: 16 March 1988 (aged 70); Yeppoon, Queensland
- Original team: Brunswick
- Height: 179 cm (5 ft 10 in)
- Weight: 86 kg (190 lb)

Playing career^{1}
| Years | Club | Games (Goals) |
| 1938, 1940 | St Kilda | 15 (9) |
- ^{1} Playing statistics correct to the end of 1940.

Leslie Alan Maskell (4 November 1917 – 16 March 1988) was an Australian rules footballer who played with St Kilda in the Victorian Football League (VFL).

Maskell was runner up in the 1939 Goulburn Valley Football League best and fairest award, the Morrison Medal, when playing with Tatura.
