= Laura Caller =

Peruvian lawyer

Laura Caller (1915–1988) was a Peruvian union lawyer, defender of peasants and politicians.

She was born in Cusco in a home frequented by intellectuals of the city due to the activities of her father, a journalist and writer.

She studied primary and started secondary school in the Colegio María Auxiliadora, Cusco, where she was expelled at age twelve for resistance to the "almost monastic" rules. She entered the College of Sciences Cusco, exclusively for men, with the support of famous Cusco intellectual José Uriel García.

In 1938 she came to Lima to study at university, intending to study agronomy, but decided on Law at the National University of San Marcos, where she majored in Agricultural Law.

Her professional work was dedicated from the start to the defence of the rights of peasant communities, and political prisoners. Her fight against the exploitation of the defenceless defined her political ideas for socialism.

Her reputation for social advocacy dates back to the 40s and 50s, however it was in 1963, when defending 200 political prisoners confined in the island prison of El Frontón, that she achieved notoriety because it was the first time a woman had faced a military tribunal as a defender. In 1966 she helped get Hugo Blanco acquitted of the death penalty and became internationally known.

In 1975 she endorsed the case of the rural community of Huayanay, on the heights of Huancavelica, who had killed the village leader in the main square, according to their ancestral customs. They were exonerated by the Velasco government, but later some of them were imprisoned in Lima.

She never married because she considered herself married to the law and led a life of austerity and sacrifice.

As a social activist she travelled around the country visiting rural communities and remote mining camps. She and her famous poncho were seen in the villages as a sign of hope. She herself was imprisoned for the crime of defending the poor.

Campaigner for women's votes and defender of peasants, she never obtained a seat in Parliament, but in 1980 joined the board of the FOCEP political group as vice-president.

In 1985 she had a leg amputated due to gangrene, a result of diabetes. Months later she travelled to Cuba for rehabilitation from which she returned with a prosthesis to continue working in the defence of the needy. She died in Lima on March 15, 1988, due to a worsening of her disease, 48 hours before she was due to receive an award from the Ministry of Labour.

She is commemorated by name in the village of Laura Caller, San Luis District, Cañete and the shanty town of A.H. Laura Caller, Los Olivos District, Lima.
