= Dibs in Search of Self =

1964 book by Virginia Mae Axline

Dibs in Search of Self is a book by clinical psychologist and author Virginia Axline published in 1964. The book chronicles a series of play therapy sessions over a period of one year with a boy (Dibs) who comes from a wealthy and highly educated family. Despite signs that he is gifted, his mother, father, and most of his teachers perceive him as having an emotional or cognitive disorder. Dibs presents abnormal social behavior by continuously isolating himself, rarely speaking, and physically lashing out at those around him.

In their weekly sessions together, Axline incorporates the principles of non-directive play therapy. Her approach to children was based on the humanistic concepts of Carl Rogers and person-centered therapy. Dibs is able to do and say whatever he wants during his hour in play therapy, while Axline provides patience and support. In this environment, Dibs slowly opens up and begins exploring his feelings. Axline's responses to Dibs are primarily reflections, demonstrating to Dibs that she is listening to him without judging him.

By the end of the book, which spans the course of one full year, Dibs makes notable strides in his ability to express himself, identify and cope with his feelings, and interact socially with his peers and family. Dibs was tested at the end of his therapy and was found to score in the extremely gifted range, with an IQ of 168 on the Stanford–Binet Intelligence Test.

== Bibliography ==
- Axline, V. (1964). Dibs in Search of Self. New York, NY: Ballantine.
- Axline, V. (1947). Play Therapy. New York, NY: Ballantine.
- Rogers, C. (1942). Counseling and Psychotherapy. Boston: Houghton Mifflin.
