= Francisco Jardón =

Spanish field hockey player (1911–1988)

Personal information
- Nationality: Spanish
- Born: 29 March 1911 Madrid, Spain
- Died: 19 March 1988 (aged 76) Madrid, Spain

Sport
- Sport: Field hockey

Francisco Jardón (29 March 1911 – 19 March 1988) was a Spanish field hockey player. He competed in the men's tournament at the 1948 Summer Olympics.
