= Ray Bromley =

Australian rules footballer, born 1915

Personal information
- Full name: Ray Bromley
- Born: 23 September 1915
- Died: 8 March 1988 (aged 72)
- Height: 185 cm (6 ft 1 in)
- Weight: 80 kg (176 lb)

Playing career^{1}
Years	Club	Games (Goals)
1940	North Melbourne	2 (0)
- ^{1} Playing statistics correct to the end of 1940.

Ray Bromley (23 September 1915 – 8 March 1988) was an Australian rules footballer who played with North Melbourne in the Victorian Football League (VFL).
