= Aletha Solter =

American psychologist

Aletha Jauch Solter
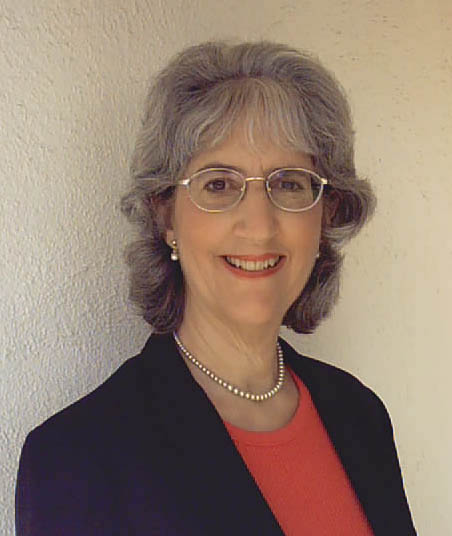
- Born: 1945 (age 80–81)
- Education: University of Geneva, Switzerland; University of California, Santa Barbara
- Occupation: Developmental psychologist
- Known for: Founder of The Aware Parenting Institute, author of six books

Aletha Jauch Solter (born 1945) is a Swiss/American developmental psychologist who studied with Jean Piaget in Switzerland before earning a PhD in psychology at the University of California, Santa Barbara. Her specialist areas are attachment, psychological trauma, and non-punitive discipline. In 1990 she founded The Aware Parenting Institute, an international organization with certified instructors in many countries. She has written seven books and led workshops for parents and professionals in 18 countries

Her work combines attachment parenting principles with an understanding of the impact of stress and trauma, and it can help families who are struggling with sleep, discipline, and emotional health issues. A controlled pilot study was conducted in Australia to evaluate the effectiveness of some aspects of the Aware Parenting approach in a brief parent education program. The researchers found that the program increased parents’ feelings of self-efficacy Another pilot study was done in Ireland to teach one aspect of Aware Parenting (Attachment Play) to social workers, who then trained parents to implement the approach. The training helped parents engage playfully with children, strengthen attachment, enhance cooperation, reduce behavior problems, and avoid the use of punishment.

== Selected works ==
=== Books ===
Aletha Solter has written seven books describing the Aware Parenting approach, which have been translated into many languages.

- The Aware Baby. Shining Star Press, 2001.
- Cooperative and Connected: Helping children flourish without punishments or rewards, Shining Star Press, 2018. (This is a revised and updated version of Helping Young Children Flourish.)
- Tears and Tantrums: What to do when babies and children cry. Shining Star Press, 1998.
- Raising Drug-Free Kids: 100 tips for parents. Da Capo Press, 2006.
- Attachment Play: How to solve children's behavior problems with play, laughter, and connection. Shining Star Press, 2013.
- Healing Your Traumatized Child: A Parent's Guide to Children's Natural Recovery Processes. Shining Star Press, 2022.
- Raising Joyful Lifelong Learners: How to Support Children's Natural Learning Processes. Shining Star Press, 2025.

=== Articles ===
- A 2-year-old child's memory of hospitalization during early infancy. Infant and Child Development, 2008, 17, 593–605.
- A case study of traumatic stress disorder in a 5-month-old infant following surgery. Infant Mental Health Journal, 2007, 28(1), 76–96.
- Hold me! The importance of physical contact with infants. Journal of Prenatal and Perinatal Psychology and Health, 2001, 15(3), 21–43.
- Warum Babys weinen (Why babies cry). In T. Harms (Ed.), Auf die Welt gekommen: Die neuen Baby Therapien (pp. 387–409). Ulrich Leutner Verlag, Berlin, 2000.
- Helping Preschoolers Cope With Stress. In B. Farber (Ed.), Guiding Young Children's Behavior: Helpful Ideas for Parents and Teachers from 28 Early Childhood Experts (pp. 118–123). Preschool Publications, Inc., 1999.
- Why do babies cry? Journal of Prenatal and Perinatal Psychology and Health, 1995, 10(1), 21–43.
- Understanding tears and tantrums. Young Children, 1992, 47(4), 64–68. (National Association for the Education of Young Children)
- Speed, accuracy, and strategy differences in spatial processing. Bulletin of the Psychonomics Society, 1981, 18(2), 58-59 (with J.W. Pellegrino & V. Cantoni).
- Broader transfer produced by guided discovery of number concepts with preschool children. Journal of Educational Psychology, 1978, 70(3), 363-371 (with R.E. Mayer).
