= Harold Gainger =

Australian rules footballer, born 1909

Personal information
- Full name: Harold John Gainger
- Born: 23 June 1909; Ondit, Victoria
- Died: 11 March 1988 (aged 78); Melbourne, Victoria
- Original team: Beeac / Terang
- Height: 182 cm (6 ft 0 in)
- Weight: 83 kg (183 lb)

Playing career^{1}
Years	Club	Games (Goals)
1934–1936	St Kilda	25 (12)
- ^{1} Playing statistics correct to the end of 1936.

Harold John Gainger (23 June 1909 – 11 March 1988) was an Australian rules footballer who played with St Kilda in the Victorian Football League (VFL).

== Career ==
Gainger, who was originally from Beeac, had already spent a season as captain-coach of Terang, before coming to St Kilda in 1934.

Described by former Geelong coach Lloyd Hagger as "one of the best ruck men in the Western District", Gainger also played at centre half-forward. He played 14 of a possible 18 games for St Kilda, in the 1934 season and looked to leave the club the following year to coach Mortlake, but was unable to get a clearance. Remaining at St Kilda, Gainger played seven league games that year, then only four in 1936.

In 1937, Gainger went to Victorian Football Association club Sandringham, where he played for two seasons.
