= International Journal of Play Therapy =

- Discipline: Psychology
- Language: English
- Edited by: Franc Hudspeth

Publication details
- History: 1992-present
- Publisher: American Psychological Association on behalf of the Association for Play Therapy (United States)
- Frequency: Quarterly

Standard abbreviations
- ISO 4: Int. J. Play Ther.

Indexing
- ISSN: 1555-6824 (print); 1939-0629 (web)
- LCCN: 2005214485
- OCLC no.: 229996014

Links
- Journal homepage; Online access; Journal page at Association of Play Therapy website

The International Journal of Play Therapy is a peer-reviewed academic journal published by the American Psychological Association on behalf of the Association of Play Therapy. The journal was established in 1992 and covers all aspects of play therapy. The editor-in-chief is Franc Hudspeth (Sacred Heart University).

== Abstracting and indexing ==
The journal is abstracted and indexed in PsycINFO.
