= Jan Epstein =

Australian cricketer

Personal information
- Born: 1 October 1918; Perth, Western Australia
- Died: 24 March 1988 (aged 69); Melbourne, Victoria
- Source: Cricinfo, 19 October 2017

Jan Epstein (1 October 1918 – 24 March 1988) was an Australian cricketer. He played his only first-class match in 1945/46, for Western Australia.
