= Frank Sutherland =

Australian rules footballer

Personal information
- Full name: Francis Chalwell Sutherland
- Born: 12 December 1929; Parkdale, Victoria
- Died: 16 March 1988 (aged 58); Chevron Island, Queensland
- Original team: Parkdale
- Height: 191 cm (6 ft 3 in)
- Weight: 80 kg (176 lb)

Playing career^{1}
Years	Club	Games (Goals)
1950–52	St Kilda	21 (10)
- ^{1} Playing statistics correct to the end of 1952.

Francis Chalwell Sutherland (12 December 1929 – 16 March 1988) was an Australian rules footballer who played with St Kilda in the Victorian Football League (VFL).
