= Buster Henderson =

West Indian cricket umpire

Personal information
- Full name: Godfrey Basil Henderson
- Born: 1911; Trinidad
- Died: 6 March 1988 (aged 76–77); Trinidad

Umpiring information
- Tests umpired: 1 (1948)
- Source: Cricinfo, 7 July 2013

Buster Henderson (1911 – 6 March 1988) was a West Indian cricket umpire. He stood in one Test match, West Indies vs. England, in 1948.

== See also ==
- List of Test cricket umpires
