= Yngve Ekström =

Swedish architect and designer (1913–1988)

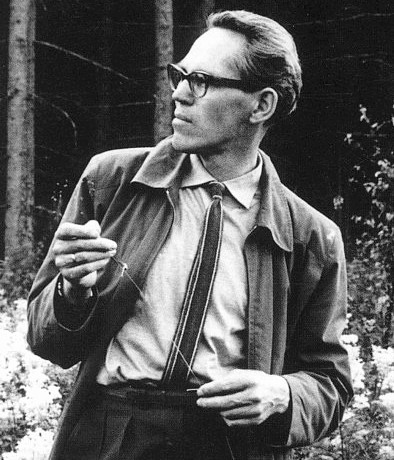
Ekström, circa 1955

Yngve Ekström (June 16, 1913 – March 13, 1988) was a Swedish furniture designer, wood carver, sculptor and architect and an important figure in the evolution of the Scandinavian Modernism movement. Yngve Ekström is best known for the "Lamino" armchair, an ergonomic and minimalist easy chair that he designed in 1956 and which has been in continuous production ever since. In 1999, the "Lamino" was named by the influential Swedish magazine Sköna hem as the Swedish furniture design of the twentieth century.

Ekström was born in Hagafors, Småland. He was the co-founder of the furniture manufacturer ESE-möbler (later renamed Swedese) with his brother Jerker and business partner Sven Bertil Sjöqvist. Ekström worked at Swedese for over 40 years until his death in 1988.
