= Alfred Hollings =

New Zealand cricketer

Personal information
- Full name: Alfred Maurice Hollings
- Born: 13 May 1906; Billericay, Essex, England
- Died: 5 March 1988 (aged 81); Wellington, New Zealand
- Batting: Right-handed
- Role: All-rounder

Domestic team information
- Years: Team
- 1926/27–1929/30: Wellington
- FC debut: 25 December 1926 Wellington v Otago
- Last FC: 7 March 1930 Wellington v Auckland

Career statistics
Competition	First-class
Matches	7
Runs scored	330
Batting average	30.00
100s/50s	0/2
Top score	65*
Balls bowled	434
Wickets	5
Bowling average	47.00
5 wickets in innings	0
10 wickets in match	0
Best bowling	2/18
Catches/stumpings	9/–
- Source: Cricinfo, 24 October 2020

Alfred Maurice Hollings (13 May 1906 – 5 March 1988) was a New Zealand lawyer and cricketer. He played in seven first-class cricket matches for Wellington from 1926 to 1930.

== Early life ==
Hollings was born at Billericay in Essex, England on 13 May 1906 to Alfred William George Hollings and Mary Margaret Hollings. He was educated at Wellington College in New Zealand, playing cricket at school, before going up to Victoria University in Wellington. He graduated with a Bachelor of Laws degree in June 1928.

== Cricket ==
Whilst at university, Hollings played cricket for the Varsity club, Victoria University's team. He scored a century playing for the team's junior team against Auckland University in 1923–24 and in December 1924 he took seven wickets for the juniors against the senior team and was considered worthy of a place in the senior team. By February 1925 he was receiving praise as the "best player in the junior grade" who had done "phenomenally well with bat and ball" and his name was suggested as one for the Wellington selector to consider. By December he had been selected in a group of players to practice for the Wellington representative team, having showed good form in a match between Varsity and the Wellington club, and it was suggested that he would "become one of Wellington's best all round cricketers".

In January 1926 he played for a Wellington Colts team against a touring Auckland team, scoring 95 runs in a "stylish display", and by February the New Zealand Times was of the opinion that his selection for the Wellington team to play Auckland "should be assured", judging him "one of the finest all-rounders playing the game in Wellington this season". In April he played for Wellington against Nelson at the Basin Reserve, showing good batting form, scoring 69 runs in a Wellington total of 497.

A good display for a Wellington Colts team against the senior team at the start of the 1926–27 season, followed by two centuries in November saw him described as "easily ahead of any other batsman in Wellington" and as "one of the most promising bats in Wellington if not in New Zealand" with the expectation that he would soon make his Wellington debut. A third century in early December, made in "tip-top style" and setting a Wellington provincial record as the first player to score centuries in three successive matches, saw the Times cricket correspondent describe Hollings as "the best colt he has during the last few years" and suggest that he had a good chance of playing for the New Zealand national cricket team on their planned tour of England in 1927, and despite a "patchy" performance for Wellington Town against a Country Districts team later in the month he was selected for the representative team for the opening Plunket Shield match of the season―the first time a Varsity player had been selected for the team since before World War I.

Hollings played in all three of Wellington's matches in the 1926–27 Plunket Shield, making his debut on Christmas Day against Otago at the Basin Reserve. Despite a duck in his first innings, he scored 23 runs in the second, and, although he failed to take wicket, was described as a "useful change bowler" ahead of the team's match against Canterbury at Lancaster Park. A better batting performance which saw him scored 65 not out in a second Wellington victory of the season, saw him retained for a non-Shield match against Auckland in January, again scoring 65 not out.

Hollings played a total of seven first-class cricket matches for Wellington, five of which were in the Plunket Shield. After his four matches during the 1926–27 season he did not play again for the representative team until a match against the MCC touring team in December 1929, (Note: The MCC team was the English cricket team which was touring New Zealand, and was the first to play Test matches against New Zealand. At the time official English touring teams played under the name, colours and badge of the MCC and were only styled "England" during Test matches.) before featuring twice in Wellington's successful Plunket Shield campaign later in the 1929/30 season―he was reported as suffering from an illness during the 1927–28 season and was "unavailable" for the team in 1928–29. In February 1927 Hollings was in the Wellington team to play against the a touring Melbourne Cricket Club team.

In Wellington senior club cricket Hollings was, in 1927, one of only five players who had scored three double centuries in a season in the previous almost 30 years. Earlier that year the Wellington Cricket Association had unsuccessfully nominated Hollings for the New Zealand team.

In 1933 Hollings was appointed Assistant Secretary for the Wellington Cricket Association. During his cricketing career Hollings played at the local senior club level for Varsity (Victoria University) from 1925 to 1929, Wellington from 1929 to 1933, and Karori from 1934 until 1937 and continued to play matches for a variety of teams until at least 1940 as well as playing golf.

== Legal career ==
After graduating, Hollings qualified as a barrister and was admitted to the bar in 1929. On 1 January 1930 TU Ronayne admitted Hollings into partnership and formed Ronayne and AM Hollings, a legal firm based in Wellington. Prior to this Hollings had been Ronayne's Managing Clerk.

The firm was dissolved in 1945 when Hollings acquired WP Coles' interest in the firm Phillips and Coles. With the acquisition the firm was renamed. In Petone it was known as Phillips, Coles, Hollings and Shayle-George, and in Wellington it was known as Phillips, Hollings and Shayle-George. (Note: The firm was later known as Phillips Fox. When DLA Piper merged the business in 2011 the New Zealand firm split off and became an independent legal company again.)

== Military service ==
During World War II Hollings was involved with the organisation of the Emergency Protection Scheme on the home front before later serving in the Royal New Zealand Air Force. In October 1943 he was promoted from Aircraftman Class 1 and received a temporary commission as a Pilot Officer. He served as an intelligence officer with No. 19 Squadron RNZAF in the Bougainville area until October 1944 when he was transferred to the Reserve of Air Force Officers and resumed his law practice.

== Personal life ==
Hollings married Lilian Etta May Gilbert in 1930. The couple had three children. He died on 5 March 1988 aged 81 and was buried at Paraparaumu, north of Wellington.
