= Virginia Axline =

Psychologist, pioneer of play therapy (1911–1988)

Virginia Mae Axline (March 31, 1911 – March 21, 1988) was an American psychologist and one of the pioneers in the use of play therapy. She wrote the book Dibs in Search of Self. She was also the author of Play Therapy, published in 1947.

Play therapy practice is still largely based on Axline's work. In the 1940s, she began to develop nondirective play therapy, the principles of which were based on Carl Rogers' newly emerging person-centered approach. In her first published work, she establishes the eight basic principles of nondirective play therapy.

Axline developed her own approach to child counseling which is grounded in the person-centered principles Rogers used when working with adult patients. Axline's approach came to be known as Nondirective Play Therapy, which laid the foundation for another type of play therapy known as Child-Centered Play Therapy (CCPT). In her book Play Therapy she discussed her theory for child psychology.

Child-Centered Play Therapy or CCPT is a type of play therapy that looks at the nonverbal communication that happens through play. It strives to promote healing, psychological and behavioral changes in children. It is one of the most common schools of play therapy in the US.

To date there are many different types of play therapy associated with all schools of psychology. For example, CBT-play therapy is an example of a type of directive play therapy.

In 1964, Axline published Dibs in Search of Self, a case study of a five-year-old patient, Dibs, who was withdrawn and uncommunicative. Eventually, play therapy led to an emotional breakthrough. This book describes the weekly sessions that extend over several months of therapy. At the end of the therapy, Dibs was tested and found to have an IQ of 168. This book has become a part of the clinical/developmental psychology curriculum at many universities. It is still known as one of the most influential books in the field of play therapy.

== Biography ==
=== Early life ===
Virginia Axline was born in Fort Wayne, Indiana to Roy G. Axline and Helen G. Axline. She grew up in Columbus, Ohio.

=== Academic career ===
After teaching elementary school for several years, Axline attended graduate school at Ohio State University where she began collaborating with Carl Rogers. She also studied at Columbia University Teachers College, and completed her doctorate in Education in 1950. She taught and did research at the University of Chicago for three years, then at Columbia University for seven years, and continued teaching at the New York University School of Medicine and School of Education before returning to Ohio State University.

Once back in Ohio, Axline opened a private practice.

== Work ==
=== Axline's Child-Centered Play Therapy (CCPT) ===
Virginia Axline is best known for her influence on child-centered play therapy (CCPT) which, unlike the standard treatments of the time, offers the child the opportunity for self-development, growth and social interaction. Some therapists use play therapy as a vehicle for diagnosis. A deep understanding of a child's underlying issues can be gained by watching a child's play. Both structured and unstructured play are encouraged. This provides the child opportunity for both behavioral and cognitive growth and development.

A common technique used in play therapy is desensitization. Desensitization can help a child reprogram disruptive behaviors.

==== Core principles ====
Axline identified eight core principles of CCPT:

1. The therapeutic relationship must be engaging, inviting, and warm from the beginning.
2. The child must be unconditionally accepted by the therapist.
3. The therapeutic environment must be totally non-judgmental for the child to feel uninhibited and willing to express emotions, feelings, and behaviors.
4. The therapist must be attentive and sensitive to the child's behaviors in order to provide reflective behaviors back to the child, this way he or she may develop self-awareness.
5. The child must be able to find solutions to his or her problems whenever possible. This way the child understands that they are solely responsible for the changes in behavior that he or she does not make.
6. Through dialogue and actions, the therapist acts as a shadow, allowing the child to lead the way through this therapeutic journey.
7. The therapist recognizes that the procedure is steady and should progress at the child's pace.
8. The only limitations are ones that ensure that the therapeutic process stay genuine and the child remain in the realm of reality, that he or she be aware of their purpose and role in the therapy.

The value of play therapy is still debated to this day. Many experts believe that it is not possible to do effective therapy through non-directive means, arguing that therapy should be directed for the purpose of methodology, boundaries, and safety. Others argue that other available therapies are more effective for some children.

== Notable works ==
- Play Therapy. Random House Publishing Group. July 1972. ISBN 0345303350.
- Dibs in Search of Self: The Renowned, Deeply Moving Story of an Emotionally lost Child Who found His Way Back. Ballantine Books. June 1986. ISBN 0345339258.
