= William Anderson (Scottish cricketer) =

Scottish cricketer

Cricket information
- Batting: Right-handed
- Bowling: Right-arm fast

Career statistics
Competition	First-class
Matches	16
Runs scored	241
Batting average	10.47
100s/50s	0/0
Top score	27
Balls bowled	2,475
Wickets	54
Bowling average	21.24
5 wickets in innings	3
10 wickets in match	0
Best bowling	6/51
Catches/stumpings	14/0
- Source: CricketArchive, 25 March 2019

William Williamson Anderson (27 November 1894 – 16 June 1973) was a Scottish cricketer from Fife.

A right arm paceman, Anderson took 1663 wickets at 8.54 for his club side Dunfermline. He also captained Scotland from 1934 to 1937 and took his career best innings figures of 6 for 51 against the touring Indians in 1932.

He served as President of the Scottish Cricket Union in 1946.
