= Culture of the Czech Republic =

Czech culture has been shaped by the nation's geographical position in Central Europe, the Slavic origins of the Czech people, neighbouring influences, and political and social developments, including periods of war and peace.

There are 16 Czech locations listed among the World Heritage Sites by UNESCO. Six Czechs have been awarded a Nobel Prize and 173 individuals from the country have been nominated.

== History ==
Evidence of settlement in what is now the Czech Republic dates back to about 800,000 BC, with traces of copper found in what is now Brno. In 500 BC, the area was settled by Celtic tribes, who were pushed out by Germanic tribes. By the sixth century AD, Slavic tribes had settled in the region, and the kingdom of Great Moravia emerged in the ninth century. Cyril and Methodius, scholars from the Byzantine Empire, brought Christianity and established the Glagolitic script. Great Moravia fell during the Magyar invasions. The Duchy of Bohemia was a Roman Catholic state formed shortly after. It grew to be an important state within the Holy Roman Empire.

=== Medieval times ===
In the 1400s, Jan Hus was executed by the Catholic authorities, contributing to the outbreak of the Hussite Wars and the formation of the proto-Protestant Hussites. The Defenestration of Prague in 1618 sparked the Thirty Year's War. Many members of the nobility supported Protestantism. Following Catholic victory, many lost their land and titles. Despite Germanisation, the Czech National Revival occurred throughout the 18th and 19th centuries, including unsuccessful revolutionary movements in 1848.

=== Modern times ===
In 1918, following World War I, Czechoslovakia was formed as an independent state with Tomáš Garrigue Masaryk as its first president. During the Second World War, the Czechs lands came under German occupation. After the occupation, Czechoslovakia came under communist rule within the Eastern Bloc. Following the Velvet Revolution of 1989, Czechoslovakia politically separated in 1993 into Czech Republic and Slovakia without a referendum. One of the leaders of the dissent, Václav Havel became the first president of the democratic Czech Republic.

The Czech Republic became a member of NATO on 12 March 1999, and the European Union on 1 May 2004. On 21 December 2007 the Czech Republic joined the Schengen Area.

== Language ==
Czech (/tʃɛk/ CHEK; endonym: čeština [ˈtʃɛʃcɪna]), historically known as Bohemian (/boʊˈhiːmiən, bə-/ boh-HEE-mee-ən, bə-; Latin: lingua Bohemica), is a West Slavic language of the Czech–Slovak group, written using the Latin alphabet. Spoken by over 12 million people, including second-language speakers, it serves as the official language of the Czech Republic. Czech is closely related to Slovak, with a high degree of mutual intelligibility, as well as to Polish, though to a lesser degree. Czech is a fusional language with a rich system of morphology and relatively flexible word order. Its vocabulary has been extensively influenced by Latin and German.

== Architecture ==
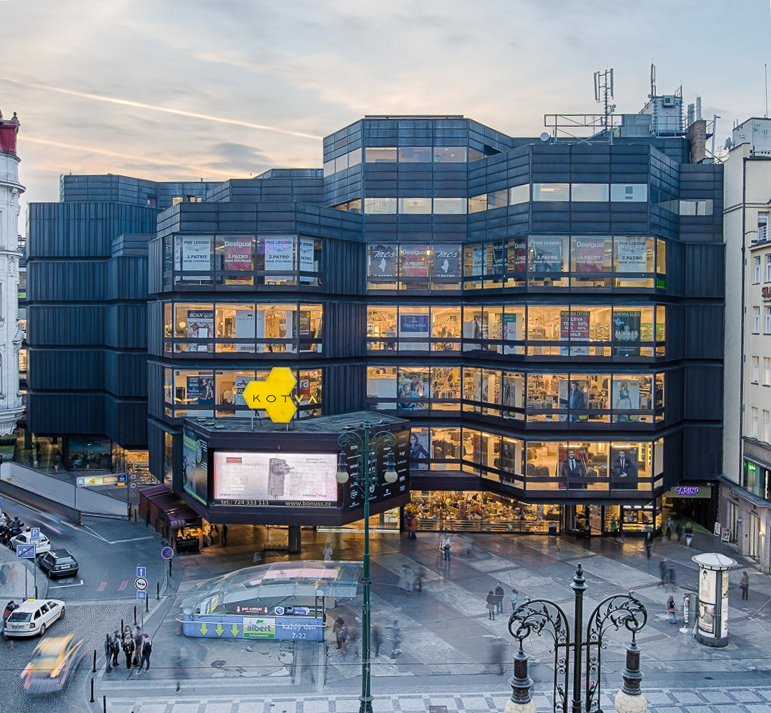
Kotva Department Store – an example of Czech Brutalist architecture (built 1970–1975)

The Czech Republic has a long architectural tradition, spanning Gothic, Baroque, Art Nouveau, Cubist, Functionalist and contemporary styles. Peter Parler significantly contributed to gothic Prague, Benedikt Rejt's late Gothic architecture. The Baroque period included the work of the Dietzenhofers family, and Santini. Early twentieth-century Prague saw the emergence of Art Nouveau landmarks designed by architects such as Josef Fanta and Osvald Polívka Rondocubist attempts of Gočár and Janák at creating a distinct national style for the new Czechoslovak Republic. The Czechoslovak pavilion was awarded the best pavilion of the 1958 World Expo in Brussels, contributing to the development of the so-called Brussels style in Czech architecture. Jan Kaplický was a renowned Czech postmodern architect, particularly known for his works in the United Kingdom. Among the best-known contemporary Czech architects is Eva Jiřičná, who won the Jane Drew Prize in 2013. One of the most prominent contemporary Czech artists is David Černý known for his installations in public spaces.

== Art ==
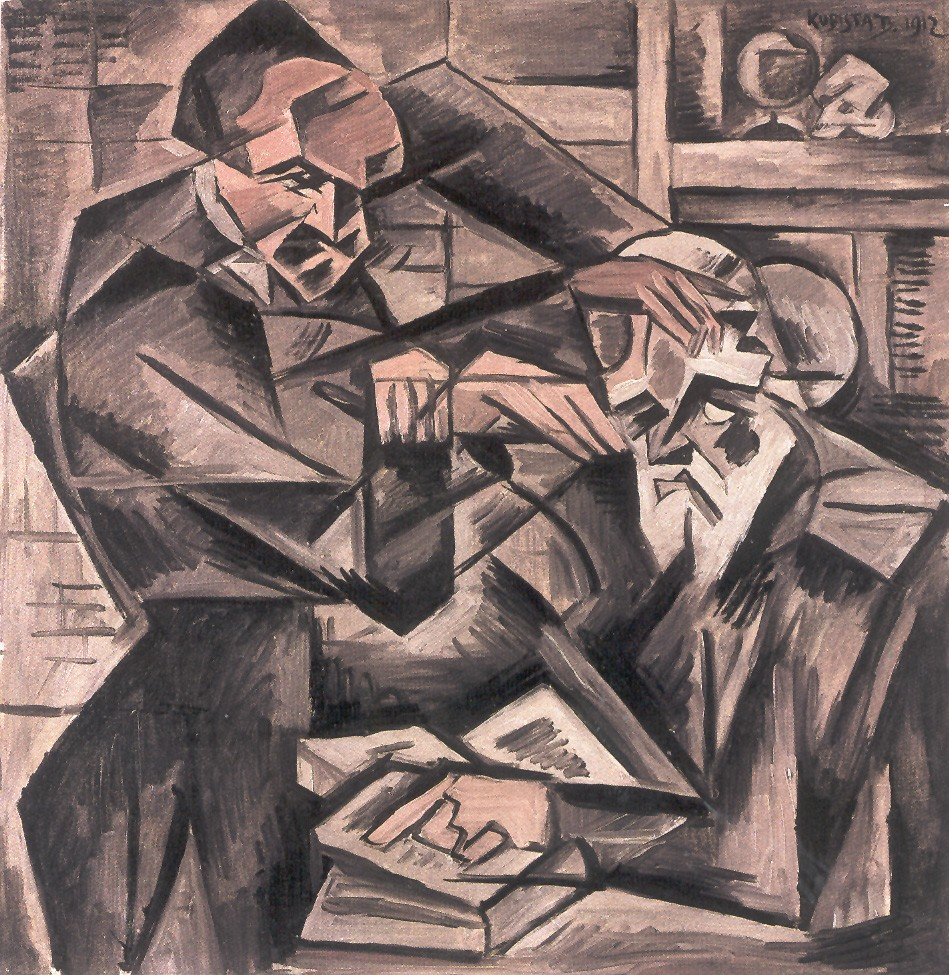
Hypnotiser by Bohumil Kubišta (1912), currently in the Gallery of Visual Arts in Ostrava

The art tradition in the Czech lands began with engravings on mammoth tusks found in Pavlov and Předmostí at Přerov, and various Venus figurines, the most famous being the Venus of Dolní Věstonice. Artists from medieval times are mostly anonymous. The three most notable might be Master of the Litoměřice Altarpiece, Master of the Třeboň Altarpiece and Master of Vyšší Brod. Another notable Czech gothic artist is Master Theodoric, a court painter of the Holy Roman Emperor Charles IV and his work in Karlštejn. Karel Škréta's portraits, Wenceslaus Hollar's engravings and etchings or Ferdinand Brokoff's statues on Charles Bridge are notable examples of Czech Baroque art.

One of the most prominent Czech Romantic painters was Josef Mánes, whose pupil was the versatile draftsman, illustrator and facade decorator Mikoláš Aleš. One of the leading figures of Art Nouveau was Alphonse Mucha, best known for his theatrical posters and decorative panels. Bohumil Kubišta created some of the most influential works of Czech expressionism and cubism. Josef Lada was one of the most notable Czech illustrators of the 20th century together with Zdeněk Burian, famous for his work in paleoart. One of the founding figures of modern Czech abstract art was František Kupka, whose painting Divertimento II sold in 2020 set a Czech auction record. Zdeněk Miler was one of the most recognised Czech animators and cartoonists, known for his character of The Little Mole (Krteček in Czech).

=== Cinema ===
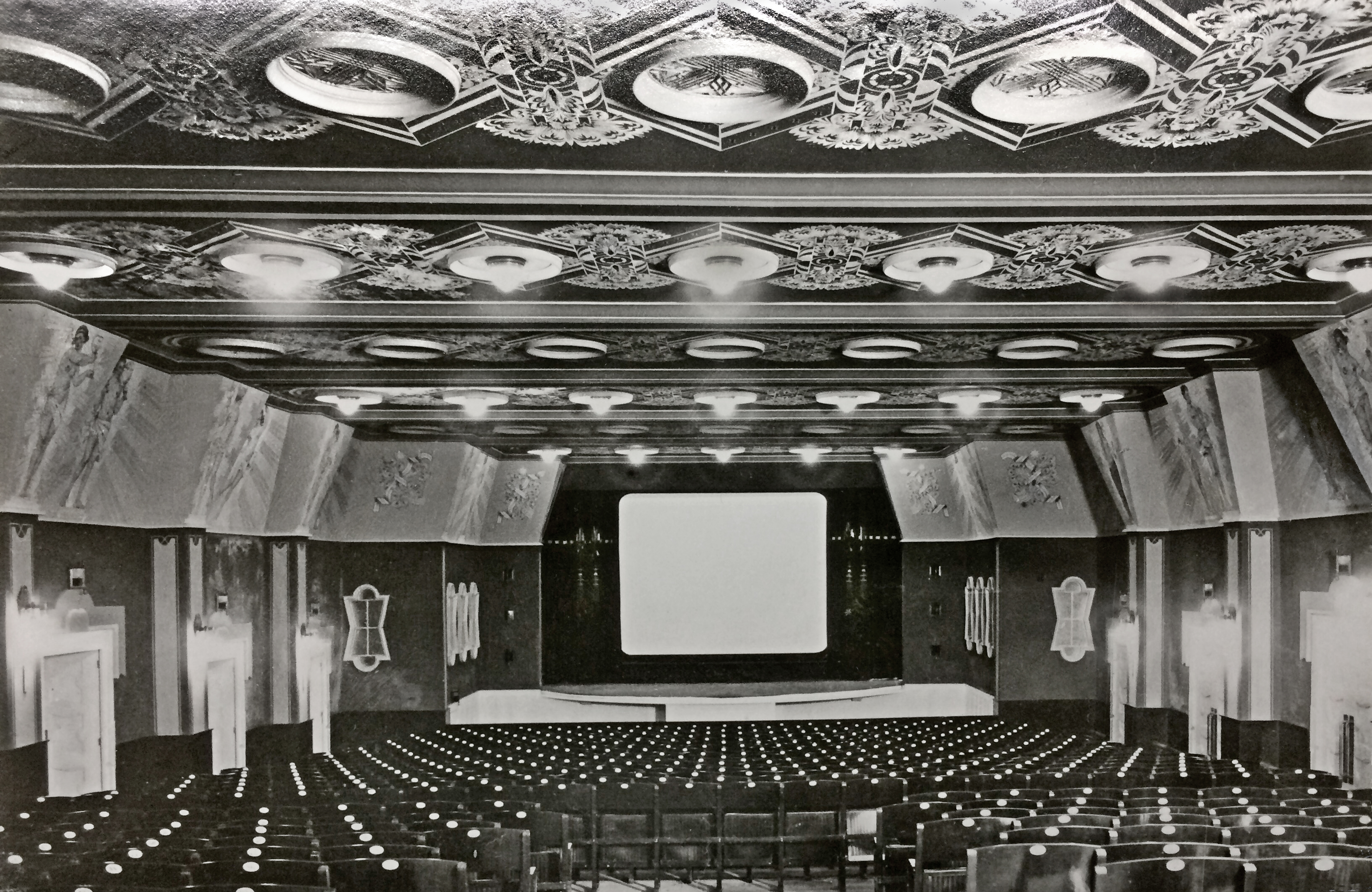
Ořechovka Cinema built in Art Deco style c. 1920

The history of Czech cinema starts with Jan Kříženecký, an early pioneer of cinematography from the end of the 19th century. The first major film studio, Barrandov Studios, was launched by Miloš Havel in 1933.

Otakar Vávra was among the most notable domestic directors in Czechoslovakia from the late 1930s onward. In the 1960s – leading up to the Prague Spring of 1968 – the Czechoslovak New Wave emerged, led by directors like Miloš Forman, Věra Chytilová or Jiří Menzel. Miloš Forman managed to flee before the invasion of Czechoslovakia in 1968 and continued his career in the United States, where he achieved international critical acclaim and received two Academy Awards for Best Director for his films One Flew Over the Cuckoo's Nest (1975) and Amadeus (1984).

Jiří Menzel was another Academy Award laureate, winning the 1967 Academy Award for Best Foreign Language Film with his first feature film, Closely Watched Trains. A contemporary director Jan Svěrák is another laureate of the Academy Award for Best Foreign Language Film, which he received for his drama Kolya in 1996.

The Czech Republic also has a long tradition in animated films. The most notable animator is Jiří Trnka – active from the 1940s to the 1960s – recognised especially for his stop motion puppet films. Some examples of notable animated series are The Little Mole and Pat & Mat.

=== Music ===
One of the most notable early Baroque composers is Adam Václav Michna of Otradovice, who lived in Jindřichův Hradec in the 17th century. He is the author of the oldest known Czech Christmas carol Chtíc, aby spal. A prominent eighteenth-century composer was Jan Dismas Zelenka, who was the director of the renowned Dresden Hofkapelle. He also influenced Bedřich Smetana, who is generally considered one of the most influential Czech composers of 19th century classical music together with Antonín Dvořák and Leoš Janáček. Of these three, the one best known internationally is Antonín Dvořák, being well received in Great Britain and spending three years in the US as the director of the National Conservatory of Music in New York City. Dvořák's New World Symphony became "one of the most popular of all time" according to Clapham. 19th century Bohemia is also associated with the development of the popular folk dance Polka.

Among the Czech musicians of the 20th century, Karel Gott was among the most prominent, being the 42 times winner of the Český slavík for the best male singer. He was one of the few musicians who were allowed to perform in the Western Bloc during the Cold War, becoming known as the "Golden voice of Prague".

=== Theatre ===
Czech theatrical tradition played an important role in the Czech National Revival. The opening of the National Theatre in Prague in 1881 represented an important achievement for Czech national cultural movements. In 1920, Karel Čapek published his science fiction play R.U.R., where he introduced the word "robot" to the English language and to science fiction as a whole.

A famous avant-garde theatre formed in the 1920s was the Osvobozené divadlo (Liberated theatre in English) of Jan Werich and Jiří Voskovec. Václav Havel – one of the leaders of the democratic dissent during the rule of the Communist Party and the first Czech president – was also a playwright, best known for his 1963 absurd play The Garden Party, which criticised conformism in socialist Czechoslovakia.

=== Literature ===
The earliest written works associated with the Kingdom of Bohemia are Middle Latin works written in the 12th to 13th centuries. The majority of works from this period were chronicles and hagiographies. Notable contemporary authors include Milan Kundera, Josef Škvorecký and Bohumil Hrabal.

=== Video games ===
Czech video games include internationally successful games, such as Operation Flashpoint, Mafia: The City of Lost Heaven and Euro Truck Simulator. Several notable game studios operate in the Czech Republic, including 2K Czech, Bohemia Interactive, SCS Software, Amanita Design, and Madfinger Games. Since 2010, Czech games have been recognised at Anifilm as part of the Czech Game of the Year competition.

== Folklore and traditions ==
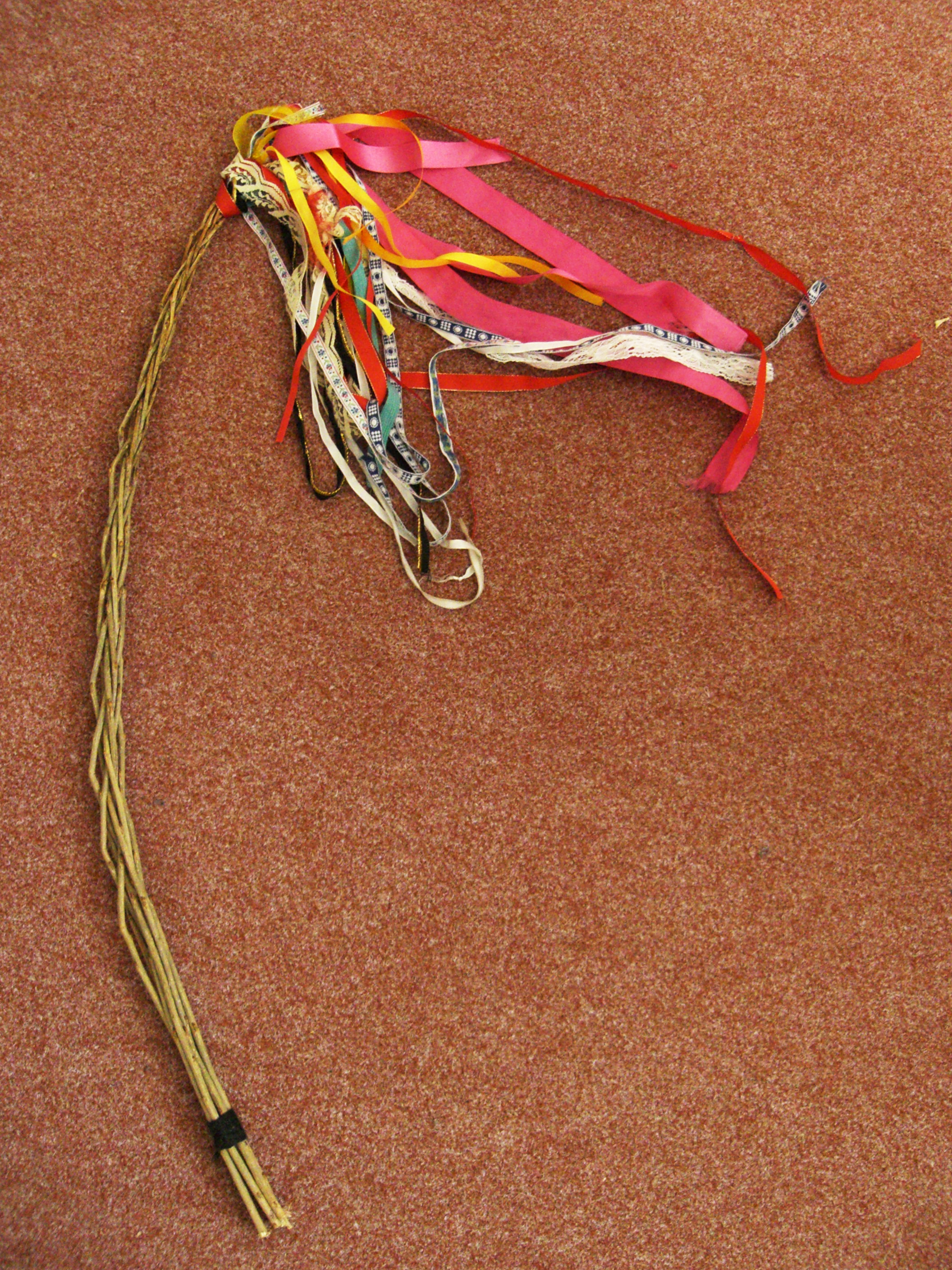
Pomlázka, braided willow twigs

The most widely celebrated holiday is Christmas, beginning with a dinner on December 24. The traditional Christmas dinner consists of a fried Czech carp and a potato salad, but many people replace it with a chicken or pork schnitzel.

Easter, or "Velikonoce" (meaning "great nights"), is another major holiday in the Czech Republic. Red is a very commonly worn colour during this time, because it symbolises joy, health, happiness, and new life that comes with spring. Families elaborately decorate Easter eggs together. Another Easter tradition is the whipping of others' legs with the pomlázka, which is a willow switch. Willow twigs are braided together and then are used by young boys to whip the girls' bottoms usually four times. This long-standing tradition is thought to bring health and youth to girls and women. The switch is called pomlázka meaning "rejuvenator", implying that a female struck by a pomlázka will become younger and prettier, according to folk tradition.

January first is New Year's Day. After a late morning start the main meal of the day is prepared, which should include pork for good luck and lentils for prosperity in the new year. According to tradition, eating poultry or fish is considered unlucky. January 6 is the Feast of the Three Kings. In many Czech and Slovak villages, boys dress up as the three wise men “Kaspar, Balthazar and Melchior”. With a piece of chalk the boys write K + B + M (or K + M + B) above the doorways on houses, where people donate money for charity. The custom is believed to bring blessings on that home and its family for a year. The chalk letters should never be cleaned off, but only replaced the next year. This is also usually the day the Christmas tree is taken down.

=== Cuisine and diet ===
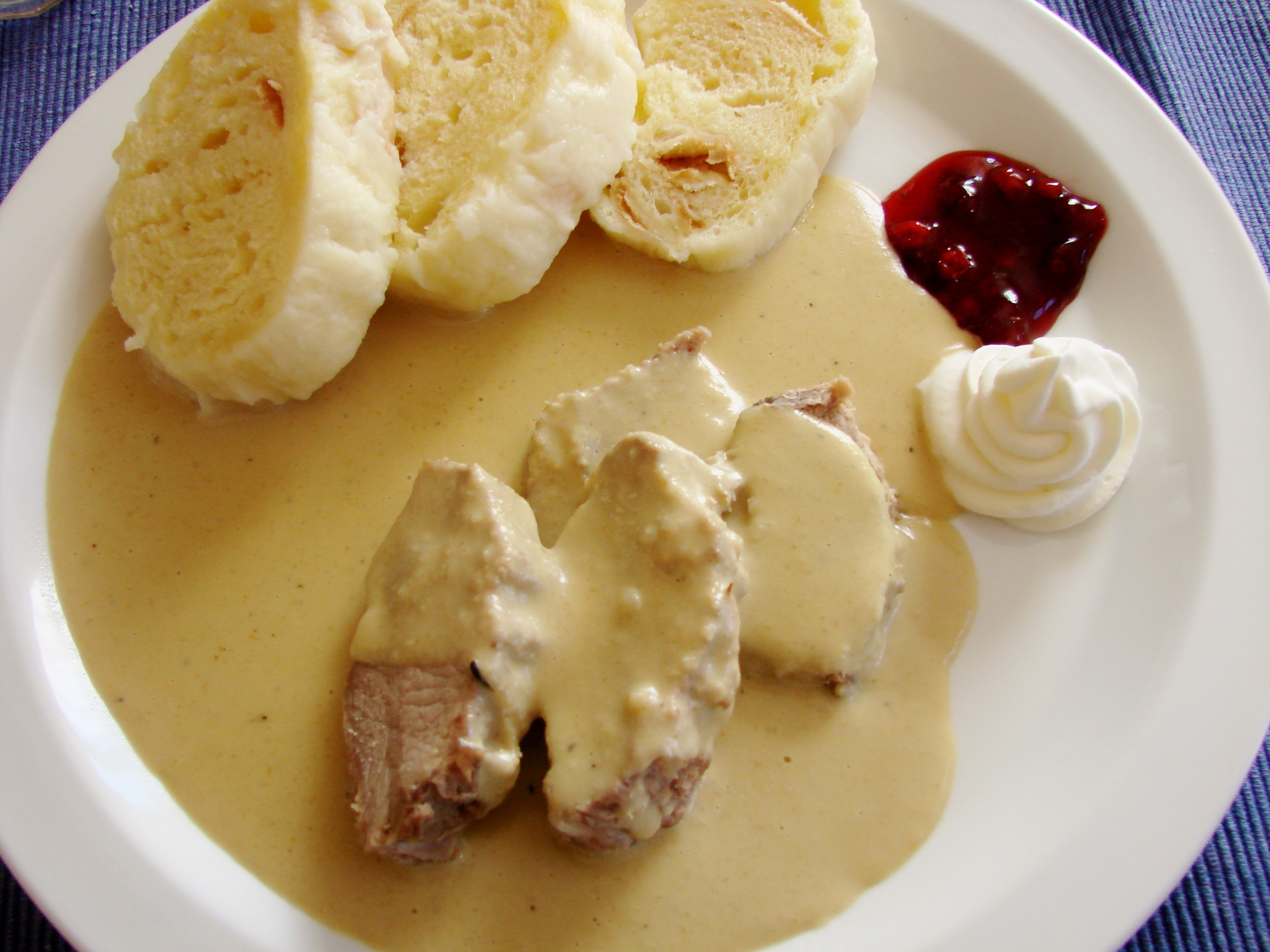
Svíčková na smetaně served with dumplings, whipped cream and cranberries

Traditionally, the main meal of the day consists of two courses beginning soup. Traditional main courses in Czech cuisine are mostly meat-based, often accompanied by a sauce or a gravy with a side dish of dumplings or potatoes. Mushroom and berry picking remain a popular hobby among many Czechs during the summer and early autumn. Czech cuisine also includes a tradition of making compotes. Czechs have been reported to have the highest per capita rate of beer consumption of any nation in the world. In 2020, the average Czech drank 143.3 litres of beer in a year.

Among the most common traditional dishes are roasted pork with dumplings and cabbage (vepřo, knedlo, zelo in Czech), svíčková na smetaně, Czech guláš, or schnitzel (řízek in Czech) with potato salad.

=== Local differences ===
The present-day Czech Republic is made up of three regions: Bohemia in the west and Moravia in the east, along with a smaller part in the north-east called Czech Silesia, which altogether are known as the Czech lands. Bohemia makes up two-thirds of the country and is also the part with the capital city, Prague. There are several notable differences between the Bohemian and Moravian regions of the country, for example Moravians more commonly speak Moravian dialects as opposed to standard Czech, Bohemians generally drink beer while Moravians drink wine, and the latter are known to be more religious and rural. The distinct traditions of the Moravian minority has also created a distinct regional identity.

== Sports ==
Sports play a significant part in the life of many Czechs. Ice hockey and football are the most popular sports of the Czech Republic. A number of other sports also hold prominence in the country including floorball, bandy, baseball, basketball, beach volleyball, cricket, lacrosse and rugby. In individual sports, Czechs are also known for performing in athletics, figure skating, tennis and others.

Some of the most notable sports people of the Czech Republic include Pavel Nedvěd, Antonín Panenka (known for the Panenka penalty kick technique), Petr Čech, Jiří Procházka, Petra Kvitová, Martina Navratilova.

=== Team sports ===
The men's national ice hockey team is one of the most decorated teams in the sport, with a large following in the country. The men's football team are the successors of Czechoslovakia's UEFA Euro 1976 first and only title to date.

== See also ==
- Holidays in the Czech Republic
- Name days in the Czech Republic
- Flag of the Czech Republic
- List of libraries in the Czech Republic
- Kde domov můj – national anthem of the Czech Republic
- Prague underground (culture)
- Youth in the Czech Republic
- Regions of the Czech Republic
