= Spanking =

Corporal punishment of striking the buttocks

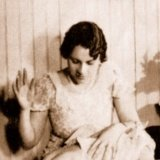
Cropped portrait of a mother spanking her child from a 1937 parenting book

Spanking is a form of corporal punishment involving the act of striking, with either the palm of the hand or an implement, the buttocks of a person to cause physical pain. The term spanking broadly encompasses the use of either the hand or implement, though the use of certain implements can also be characterized as other, more specific types of corporal punishment such as belting, caning, paddling, and slippering.

Some parents spank children in response to undesired behavior. Adults more commonly spank boys than girls both at home and in school. Many countries have outlawed the spanking of children in every setting, including homes, schools, and penal institutions, while others permit it when done by a parent or guardian.

Medical organizations discourage its use in favor of healthier discipline strategies. Some research has found correlations between spanking and increased aggression, mental health issues, and decreased obedience in children, however findings have been inconsistent, and correlation does not prove causation. A 2024 analysis of previous studies found that spanking, when limited to the open hand under specific conditions, accounted for less than 1% of the variance in child outcomes; concluding that negative effects had been overestimated, but still recommended caution and restricting it's use to children who break time-out punishment. Major medical organizations recommend against the use of spanking.

== Terminology ==
In American English, dictionaries define spanking as being administered with either the open hand or an implement such as a paddle. Thus, the standard form of corporal punishment in US schools (use of a paddle) is often referred to as a spanking. In North America, the word "spanking" has often been used as a synonym for an official paddling in school, and sometimes even as a euphemism for the formal corporal punishment of adults in an institution.

In British English, most dictionaries define "spanking" as being given only with the open hand. In the United Kingdom, Ireland, Australia, and New Zealand, the word "smacking" is generally used in preference to "spanking" when describing striking with an open hand, rather than with an implement. Whereas a spanking is invariably administered to the bottom, a "smacking" is less specific and may refer to slapping the child's hands, arms, or legs as well as its bottom.

== Effect on children ==
The main reasons parents give for spanking their children are to make children more compliant and to promote better behavior, especially to put a stop to their children's apparent aggressive behaviors. However, research has shown that spanking (or any other form of corporal punishment) is associated with the opposite effect. When adults physically punish children, the children tend to obey parents less with time and develop more aggressive behaviors, including toward other children. This increase in aggressive behavior appears to reflect the child's perception that hitting is the way to deal with anger and frustration.

There are also many adverse physical, mental, and emotional effects correlated with spanking and other forms of corporal punishment, including various physical injuries, increased anxiety, depression, and antisocial behavior. Adults who were spanked during their childhood are more likely to abuse their children and spouse.

The American Academy of Pediatrics (AAP), Canadian Paediatric Society (CPS), Royal College of Paediatrics and Child Health (RCPCH), and the Royal Australasian College of Physicians (RACP) all recommend that no child should be spanked and instead favor the use of effective, healthy forms of discipline. Additionally, the AAP recommends that primary care providers (e.g., pediatricians and family medicine physicians) begin to discuss parents' discipline methods no later than nine months of age and consider initiating such discussions by age 3–4 months. By eight months of age, 5% of parents report spanking and 5% report starting to spank by age three months. The AAP also recommends that pediatricians discuss effective discipline strategies and counsel parents about the ineffectiveness of spanking and the risks of harmful effects associated with the practice to minimize harm to children and guide parents.

Although parents and other advocates of spanking often claim that spanking is necessary to promote child discipline, studies have shown that parents tend to apply physical punishment inconsistently and tend to spank more often when they are angry or under stress. The use of corporal punishment by parents increases the likelihood that children will suffer physical abuse, and most documented cases of physical abuse in Canada and the United States begin as disciplinary spankings. If a child is frequently spanked, this form of corporal punishment tends to become less effective at modifying behavior over time (also known as extinction). In response to the decreased effectiveness of spanking, some parents increase the frequency or severity of spanking or use an object.

A 2024 meta-analysis of previous studies by Larzelere et al. examined effects on children when data was limited to "customary" spanking, where only two strikes with the open hand is used on the buttocks, with children at least 18 months old and no older than 11 years. The paper found that this type of spanking accounted for less than 1% of changes in child outcomes, concluding that "blanket anti-spanking injunctions" were unsupported. The authors noted that evidence suggests spanking could be restricted to children who break time-out.

== Alternatives to spanking ==
National and subnational laws limiting spanking States where it is illegal for parents to spank a child at home States where it is illegal for children to be spanked at school [stripes – the law varies by region or by the type of school]

Parents may spank less – or not at all – if they have learned effective discipline techniques, as many view spanking as a last resort for disciplining their children. There are many alternatives to spanking and other forms of corporal punishment:

- Time-in, increasing praise, and special time to promote desired behaviors
- Time-outs to take a break from escalating misbehavior
- Positive reinforcement of rewarding desirable behavior with a star, sticker, or treat
- Implementing non-physical punishment (psychology) in which an unpleasant consequence follows misbehavior, such as taking away a privilege
- Ignoring low-level misbehaviors and prioritizing attention on more significant forms of misbehavior
- Avoiding the opportunity for misbehavior and thus the need for corrective discipline.

== In the home ==
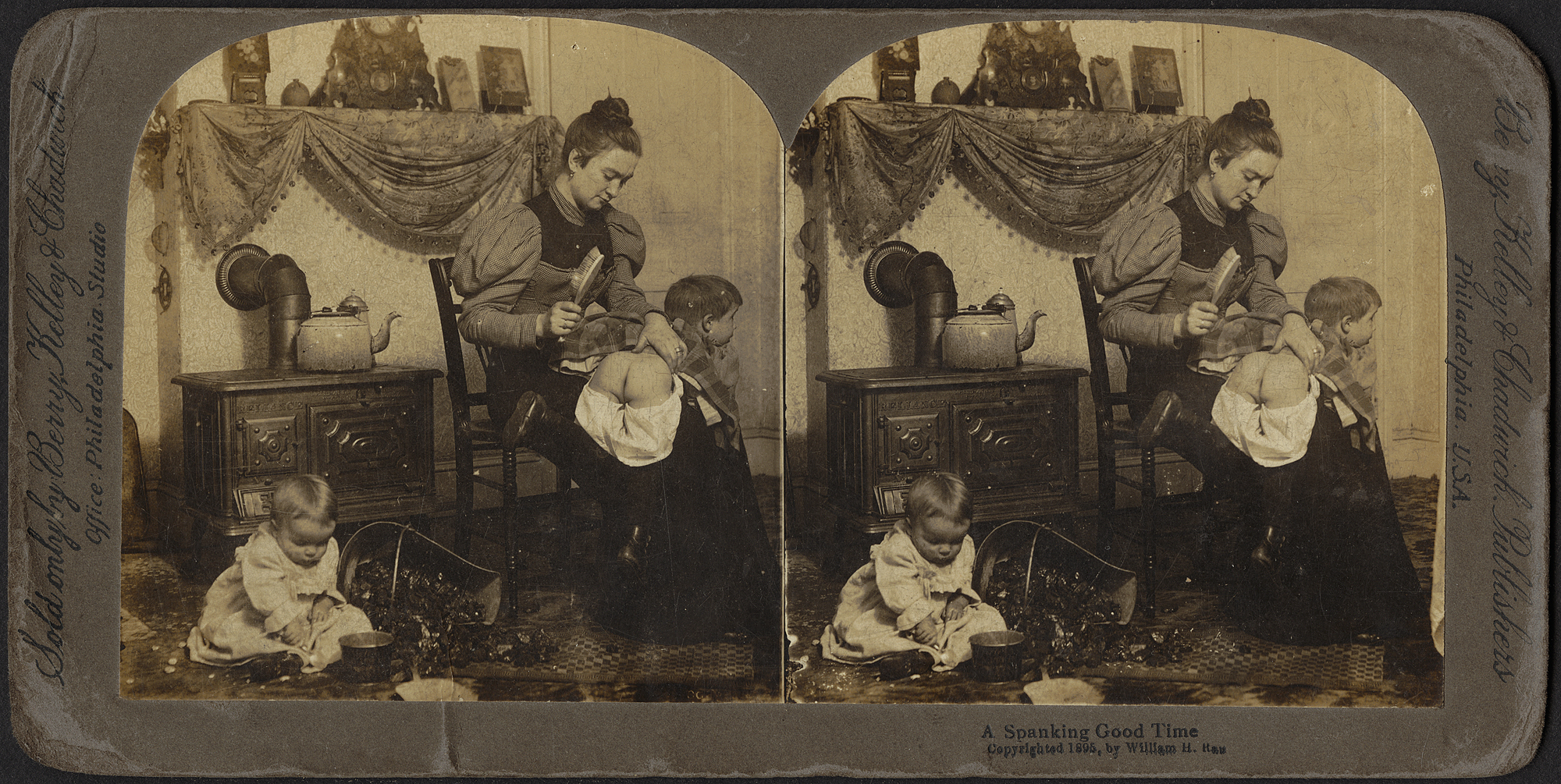
Representation from 1895 of a mother spanking her child on the bare bottom with a hairbrush for breaking the vase

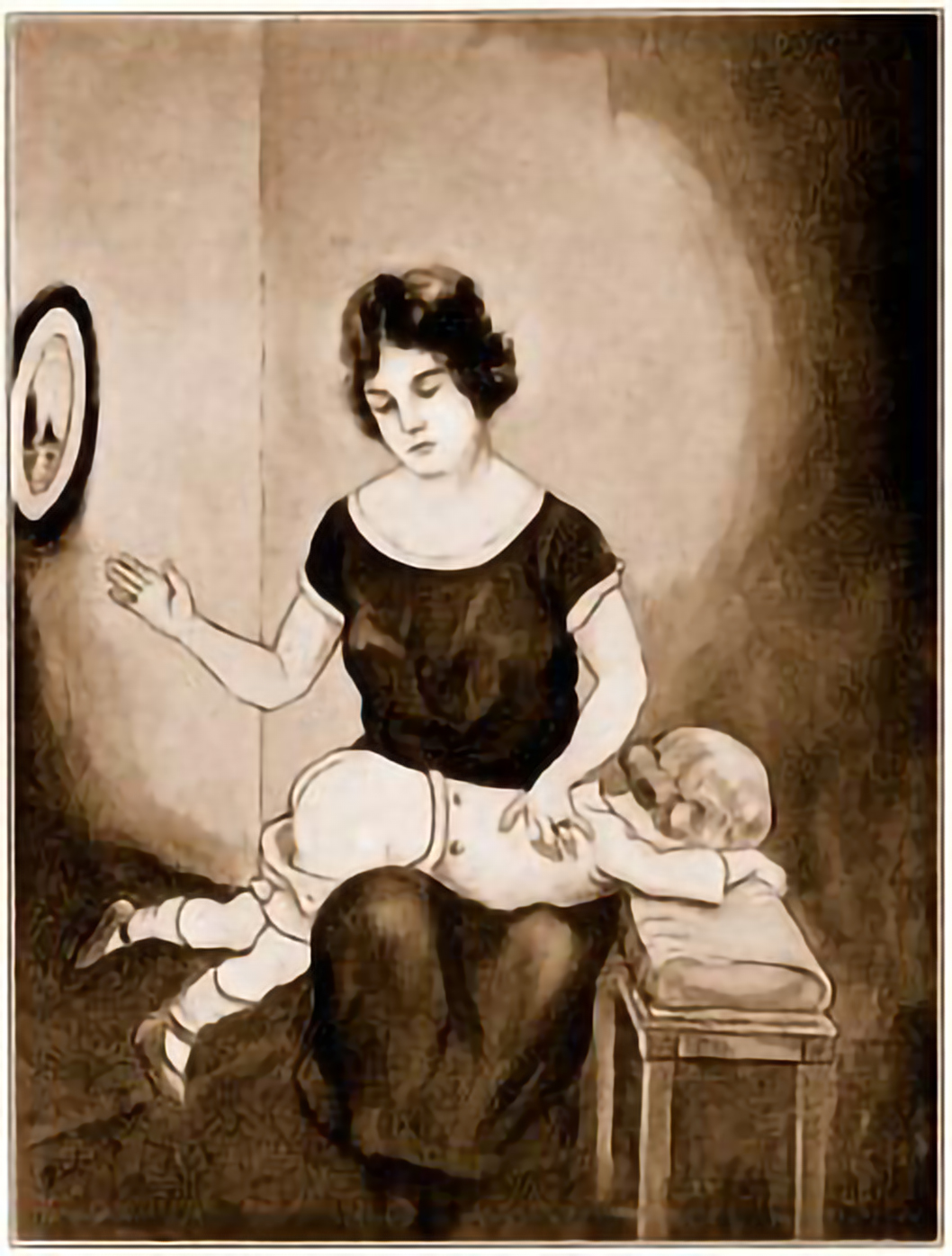
Portrait of mother spanking her child from the 1925 parenting book Correction that Corrects

Parents commonly spank their children as a form of corporal punishment in the United States; however, support for this practice appears to be declining amongst U.S. parents. Spanking is typically done with one or more slaps on the child's buttocks with a bare hand, although, not uncommonly, various objects are used to spank children, such as a hairbrush or wooden spoon. Historically, adults have spanked boys more than girls. In the United States, adults commonly spank toddlers the most.

== In schools ==
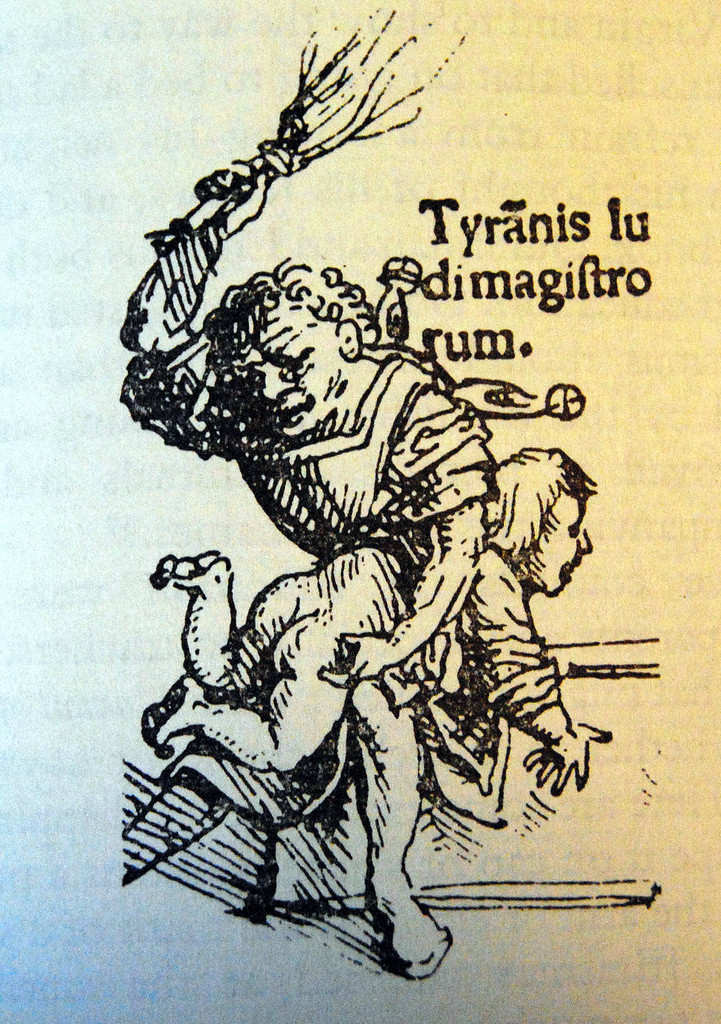
Medieval representation of a schoolboy being birched

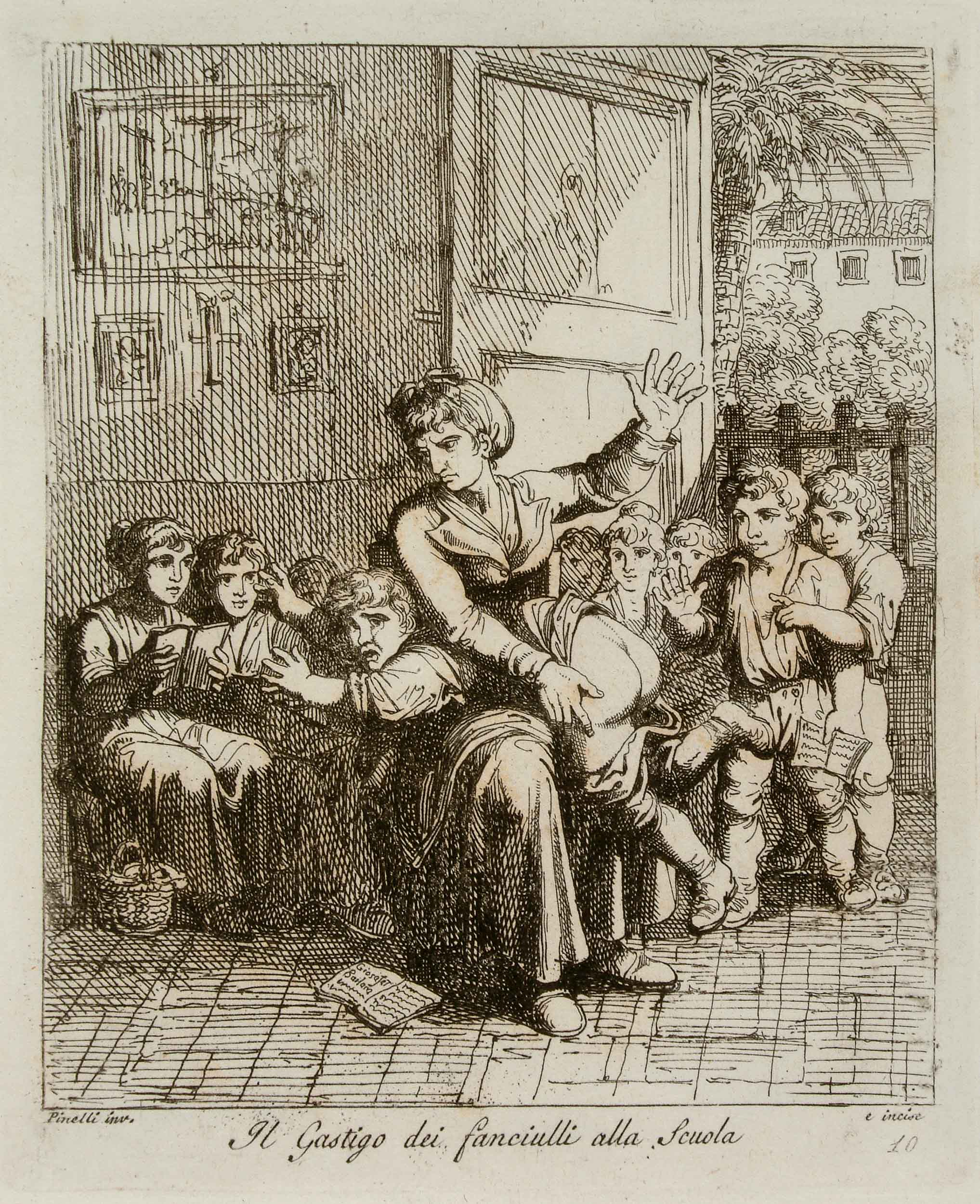
Drawing from 1821 showing a school teacher from Rome spanking a student on the bare bottom

Corporal punishment, usually delivered with an implement (such as a paddle or cane) rather than with the open hand, used to be a common form of school discipline in many countries, but it is now banned in most of the Western World.

Corporal punishment, such as caning, remains a common form of discipline in schools in several Asian and African countries, even in countries in which this practice has been deemed illegal such as India and South Africa. In these cultures it is referred to as "caning" and not "spanking." The Supreme Court of the United States in 1977 held that the paddling of school students was not per se unlawful. However, 33 states have now banned paddling in public schools. It is still common in some schools in the South, and more than 167,000 students were paddled in the 2011–2012 school year in American public schools. Students can be physically punished from kindergarten to the end of high school, meaning that even adults who have reached the age of majority are sometimes spanked by school officials.

Several medical, pediatric, or psychological societies have issued statements opposing all forms of corporal punishment in schools, citing such outcomes as poorer academic achievements, increases in antisocial behaviors, injuries to students, and an unwelcoming learning environment. They include the American Medical Association, the American Academy of Child and Adolescent Psychiatry, the American Psychoanalytic Association, the American Academy of Pediatrics (AAP), the Society for Adolescent Medicine, the American Psychological Association, the Royal College of Paediatrics and Child Health, the Royal College of Psychiatrists, the Canadian Paediatric Society and the Australian Psychological Society, as well as the United States' National Association of School Psychologists and National Association of Secondary School Principals.

== Adult spanking ==
Theatrical release poster for Kiss Me Kate, 1953

Most spanking performed between adults in the 21st century within the Western world is erotic spanking.

Within the early 20th century, American men spanking their wives and girlfriends was often seen as an acceptable form of discipline. It was a common trope in American films, from the earliest days up through the 1960s, and was often used to allude to romance between the man and woman.

In the early 21st century, adherents of a subculture known as Christian domestic discipline have, on a literalist interpretation of the Bible, justified spanking as a form of acceptable punishment of women by their husbands, even though there are no direct teachings or examples in the Bible of husbands spanking their wives. Critics describe such practices as a form of domestic abuse.

A few countries have a judicial corporal punishment for adults.

== Ritual spanking traditions ==
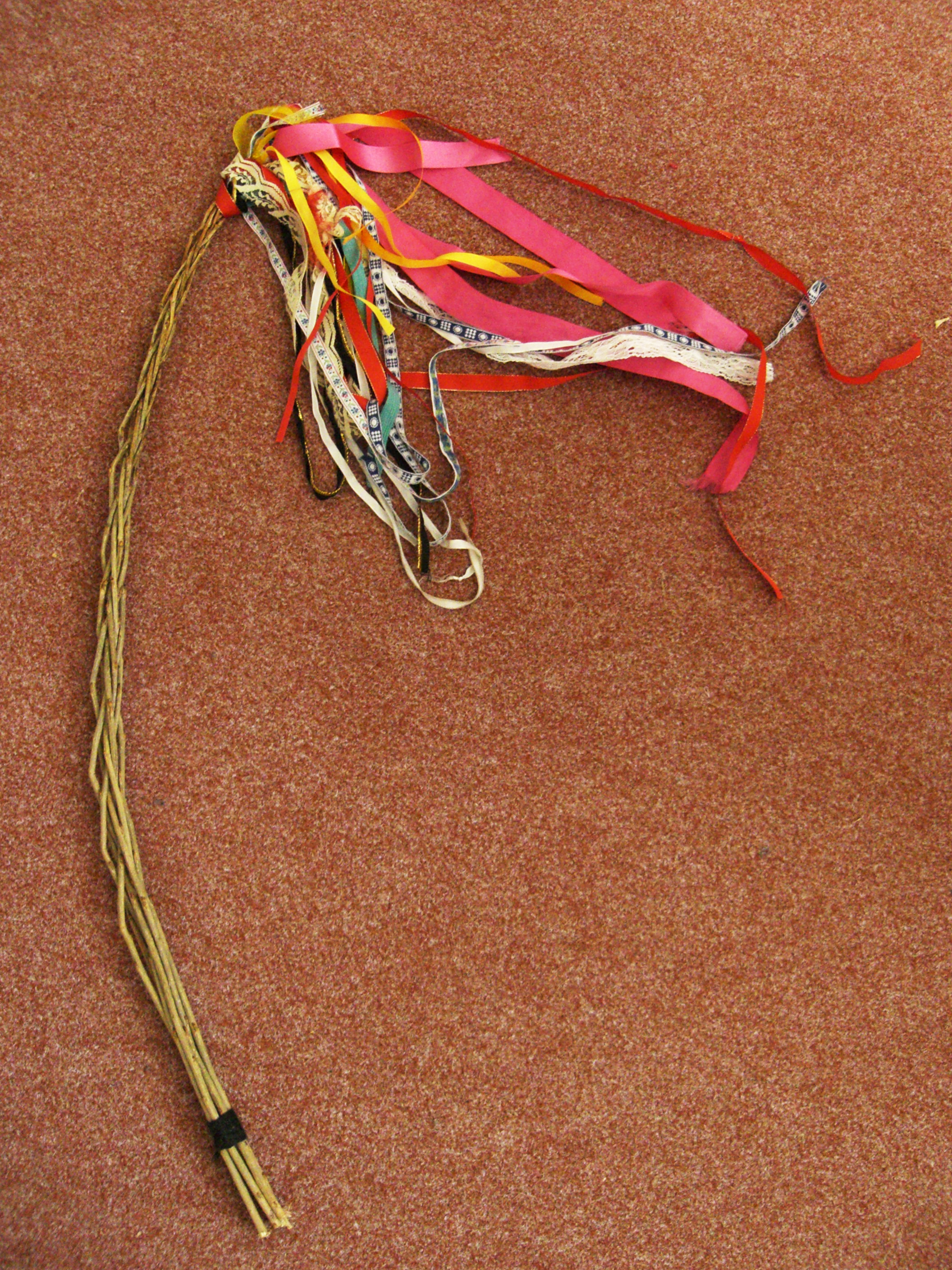
An Easter whip (Czech: pomlázka; Slovak: korbáč)

=== Asia ===
On the first day of the lunar Chinese New Year holidays, a week-long 'Spring Festival', the most important festival for Chinese people all over the world, thousands of Chinese visit the Taoist Dong Lung Gong temple in Tungkang to go through the century-old ritual to get rid of bad luck. Men traditionally receive spankings and women get whipped, with the number of strokes to be administered (always lightly) by the temple staff being decided in either case by the god Wang Ye and by burning incense and tossing two pieces of wood, after which all go home happily, believing their luck will improve.

=== Europe ===
On Easter Monday, there is a Slavic tradition of spanking girls and young ladies with woven willow switches (Czech: pomlázka; Slovak: korbáč) and dousing them with water.

In Slovenia, there is a jocular tradition that anyone who succeeds in climbing to the top of Mount Triglav receives a spanking or birching.

In Poland, there is a tradition named Pasowanie, which is celebrated on the 18th birthday. The birthday person receives eighteen smacks with the belt from the guests at the birthday party.

=== North America ===
Birthday spanking is a tradition within some parts of the United States. Within the tradition, an individual (commonly, though not exclusively, a child) upon their birthday receives, typically corresponding to their age, several spanks. Characteristically, these spankings are playful and are administered in such a fashion that the recipient receives no or only minor discomfort.

== See also ==
- UN Convention on the Rights of the Child
- Corporal punishment
- Erotic spanking
- Caning in Singapore
- Easter whip
