= Name days in the Czech Republic =

In the Czech Republic, each day of the year, except national holidays, corresponds to a personal name. People celebrate their name day ("svátek"—or more formally "jmeniny", but that term isn't usually used) on the date corresponding to their own given name.

In the past, parents were not allowed to choose just any name for a child. This has changed, although it is still common to choose the name from the name day "calendar", and any highly unusual name has to be approved by a special office. The original list was the Roman Catholic calendar of saints, but many changes were made to reflect the present-day usage of names.

The name day is commonly of less importance than birthdays to Czech people.

== January ==
1. New Year's Day
2. Karina
3. Radmila
4. Diana
5. Dalimil
6. Tři králové
7. Vilma
8. Čestmír
9. Vladan
10. Břetislav
11. Bohdana
12. Pravoslav
13. Edita
14. Radovan
15. Alice
16. Ctirad
17. Drahoslav
18. Vladislav
19. Doubravka
20. Ilona
21. Běla
22. Slavomír
23. Zdeněk
24. Milena
25. Miloš
26. Zora
27. Ingrid
28. Otýlie
29. Zdislava
30. Robin
31. Marika

== February ==
1. Hynek/Jasmína
2. Nela, Hromnice
3. Blažej
4. Jarmila
5. Dobromila
6. Vanda/Arjuna
7. Veronika
8. Milada
9. Apolena
10. Mojmír
11. Božena
12. Slavěna
13. Věnceslav
14. Valentýn
15. Jiřina
16. Ljuba
17. Miloslava
18. Gizela
19. Patrik
20. Oldřich
21. Lenka
22. Petr
23. Svatopluk
24. Matěj
25. Liliana
26. Dorota
27. Alexandr
28. Lumír
29. Horymír

== March ==
1. Bedřich
2. Anežka
3. Kamil
4. Stela
5. Kazimír
6. Miroslav
7. Tomáš
8. Gabriela
9. Františka
10. Viktorie
11. Anděla
12. Řehoř
13. Růžena
14. Rút/Matylda
15. Ida
16. Elena/Herbert
17. Vlastimil
18. Eduard
19. Josef
20. Světlana
21. Radek
22. Leona
23. Ivona
24. Gabriel
25. Marián
26. Emanuel
27. Dita
28. Soňa
29. Taťána
30. Arnošt
31. Kvido

== April ==
1. Hugo
2. Erika
3. Richard
4. Ivana
5. Miroslava
6. Vendula
7. Heřman
8. Ema
9. Dušan
10. Darja
11. Izabela
12. Julius
13. Aleš
14. Vincenc
15. Anastázie
16. Irena
17. Rudolf
18. Valérie
19. Rostislav
20. Marcela
21. Alexandra
22. Evženie
23. Vojtěch
24. Jiří
25. Marek
26. Oto
27. Jaroslav
28. Vlastislav
29. Robert
30. Blahoslav

== May ==
1. Labour Day
  (May Day)
2. Zikmund
3. Alexej
4. Květoslav
5. Klaudie
6. Radoslav
7. Stanislav
8. National holiday
9. Ctibor
10. Blažena
11. Svatava
12. Pankrác
13. Servác
14. Bonifác
15. Žofie
16. Přemysl
17. Aneta
18. Nataša
19. Ivo a Engelbert
20. Zbyšek
21. Monika
22. Emil
23. Vladimír
24. Jana
25. Viola
26. Filip
27. Valdemar
28. Vilém
29. Maxmilián
30. Ferdinand
31. Kamila

== June ==
1. Laura
2. Jarmil
3. Tamara
4. Dalibor
5. Dobroslav
6. Norbert
7. Iveta
8. Medard
9. Stanislava
10. Gita
11. Bruno
12. Antonie
13. Antonín
14. Roland
15. Vít
16. Zbyněk
17. Adolf
18. Milan
19. Leoš
20. Květa/Květuše
21. Alois
22. Pavla
23. Zdeňka
24. Jan
25. Ivan
26. Adriana
27. Ladislav
28. Lubomír
29. Petr a Pavel
30. Šárka

== July ==
1. Jaroslava
2. Patricie
3. Radomír
4. Prokop
5. Cyril/Metoděj
6. National holiday
  (Jan Hus, 1415)
7. Bohuslava
8. Nora
9. Drahoslava
10. Libuše/Amálie
11. Olga
12. Bořek
13. Markéta
14. Karolína
15. Jindřich
16. Luboš
17. Martina
18. Drahomíra
19. Čeněk
20. Ilja
21. Vítězslav
22. Magdaléna
23. Libor
24. Kristýna
25. Jakub
26. Anna
27. Věroslav
28. Viktor
29. Marta
30. Bořivoj
31. Ignác

== August ==
1. Oskar
2. Gustav
3. Miluše
4. Dominik
5. Kristián
6. Oldřiška
7. Lada
8. Soběslav
9. Roman
10. Vavřinec
11. Zuzana
12. Klára
13. Alena
14. Alan
15. Hana
16. Jáchym
17. Petra
18. Helena
19. Ludvík
20. Bernard
21. Johana
22. Bohuslav
23. Sandra
24. Bartoloměj
25. Radim
26. Luděk
27. Otakar
28. Augustýn
29. Evelína
30. Vladěna
31. Pavlína

== September ==
1. Linda/Samuel
2. Adéla
3. Bronislav/Bronislava
4. Jindřiška
5. Boris
6. Boleslav
7. Regina/Regína
8. Mariana
9. Daniela
10. Irma
11. Denisa
12. Marie
13. Lubor
14. Radka
15. Jolana
16. Ludmila
17. Naděžda
18. Kryštof
19. Zita
20. Oleg
21. Matouš
22. Darina
23. Berta
24. Jaromír
25. Zlata
26. Andrea
27. Jonáš
28. Václav
29. Michal
30. Jeroným

== October ==
1. Igor
2. Olívie/Oliver
3. Bohumil
4. František
5. Eliška
6. Hanuš
7. Justýna
8. Věra
9. Štefan/Sára
10. Marina
11. Andrej
12. Marcel
13. Renáta
14. Agáta
15. Tereza
16. Havel
17. Hedvika
18. Lukáš
19. Michala
20. Vendelín
21. Brigita
22. Sabina
23. Teodor
24. Nina
25. Beáta
26. Erik
27. Šarlota/Zoe
28. National holiday
29. Silvie
30. Tadeáš
31. Štěpánka

== November ==
1. Felix, Kani
2. All Souls' Day
3. Hubert
4. Karel
5. Miriam
6. Liběna
7. Saskie
8. Bohumír
9. Bohdan
10. Evžen
11. Martin
12. Benedikt
13. Tibor
14. Sáva
15. Leopold
16. Otmar
17. Mahulena
18. Romana
19. Alžběta
20. Nikola
21. Albert
22. Cecílie
23. Klement
24. Emílie
25. Kateřina
26. Artur
27. Xenie
28. René
29. Zina
30. Ondřej

== December ==
1. Iva
2. Blanka
3. Svatoslav
4. Barbora
5. Jitka
6. Mikuláš
7. Ambrož
8. Květoslava
9. Vratislav
10. Julie
11. Dana
12. Simona
13. Lucie
14. Lýdie
15. Radana
16. Albína
17. Daniel
18. Miloslav
19. Ester
20. Dagmar
21. Natálie
22. Šimon
23. Vlasta
24. Adam/Eva, Christmas Eve
25. 1st Christmas Holiday
26. Štěpán (2nd Christmas holiday)
27. Žaneta
28. Bohumila
29. Judita
30. David
31. Silvestr

== See also ==
- Name day
- List of saints
