= Emmausgang =

An Emmausgang is a Christian tradition which is still practiced today, mainly in southern Germany and Austria, commemorating the walk of the disciples to Emmaus, to which Jesus followed them without being recognized. The Emmausgang is made on Easter Monday (also known as Emmaustag or Emmaus Day) as a spiritual walk with prayer and song or as a contemplative stroll through nature as it awakens. A related tradition in the Weinviertel area of Austria is the "Grean" (whose name comes from ins Grüne gehen 'going into the countryside/green'), a meeting in the open air or in a wine cellar with food and drink.

A special form of the Emmausgang is kept alive in the Borghorst area of Steinfurt in Westphalia by the members of the shooting club "Prinzen Schützengesellschaft von 1490" on Easter Sunday at the onset of dusk, who travel to the local church with torches and brass lanterns (Emmaus lanterns) while singing Christian songs and celebrate in a church service there.
