= Bratislav =

- Gender: male

Origin
- Origin: Slavic
- Meaning: brat ("relative, brother") + slava ("glory, fame")

Other names
- Alternative spelling: Братислав
- Variant form: Bratislava {f}

Bratislav (Cyrillic: Братислав) is a Slavic origin given name meaning: "brat" - relative, brother and "slava" - glory, fame. Feminine form is Bratislava (Cyrillic: Братислава). The name may refer to:

- Bratislav Mijalković, Serbian former football player
- Bratislav Punoševac, Serbian footballer
- Bratislav Ristić, Serbian football midfielder
- Bratislav Živković (footballer), Serbian former football midfielder

== See also ==
- Bretislav, a masculine given name
- Bratislava, the capital of Slovakia
- Wrocław, a city in Poland
- Bratslav, an urban-type settlement in Ukraine
