= Bretislav =

Bretislav (Czech: Břetislav, Latin: Bretislaus) is a Czech masculine given name. It may refer to:

- Bretislav I (1005–1055), Duke of Bohemia
- Bretislav II (1060–1100), Duke of Bohemia
- Bretislav III (died 1197), Duke of Bohemia
- Břetislav Dolejší (1928–2010), Czechoslovak footballer
- Břetislav Bakala (1897–1958), Czech conductor, pianist, and composer
- Břetislav Pojar (1923–2012), puppeteer, animator and film director
- Břetislav Hůla (1888–1937), Comintern
- Břetislav Rychlík (born 1958), Czech actor
- Břetislav Benda (1897–1983), Czech sculptor
- Břetislav Horyna (born 1959), philosopher and religious scholar
- Břetislav Bartoš (1893–1926), Czech painter

== See also ==
- Bratislav, a masculine given name
