= Jitka =

Jitka is a Czech feminine given name. It is a nickname of the Hebrew name Judith, meaning He will be praised or woman of Judea. The old Czech form is Jutka, derived from the German name Jutta. The name day is celebrated on 5 December. Pronounced "YIT-kah".

Notable people with the name include:

- Judith of Schweinfurt (Czech: Jitka ze Schweinfurtu; 1003–1058), Czech princess
- Jitka Babická (born 1939), Czech figure skater
- Jitka Čvančarová (born 1978), Czech actress
- Jitka Harazimova (born 1975), Czech bodybuilder
- Jitka Janáčková (born 1973), Czech sprint canoer
- Jitka Landová (born 1990), Czech biathlete
- Jitka Legatová (born 1944), Czech slalom canoer
- Jitka Seitlová (born 1954), Czech politician
- Jitka Schneiderová (born 1973), Czech actress
- Jitka Snížková (1924–1989), Czech composer, music educator and musicologist
- Jitka Válková (born 1991), Czech beauty pageant contestant
- Jitka Zelenohorská (born 1946), Czech actress

== See also ==
- 3395 Jitka (1985 UN), a main-belt asteroid
