= Easter Monday =

Day after Easter Sunday

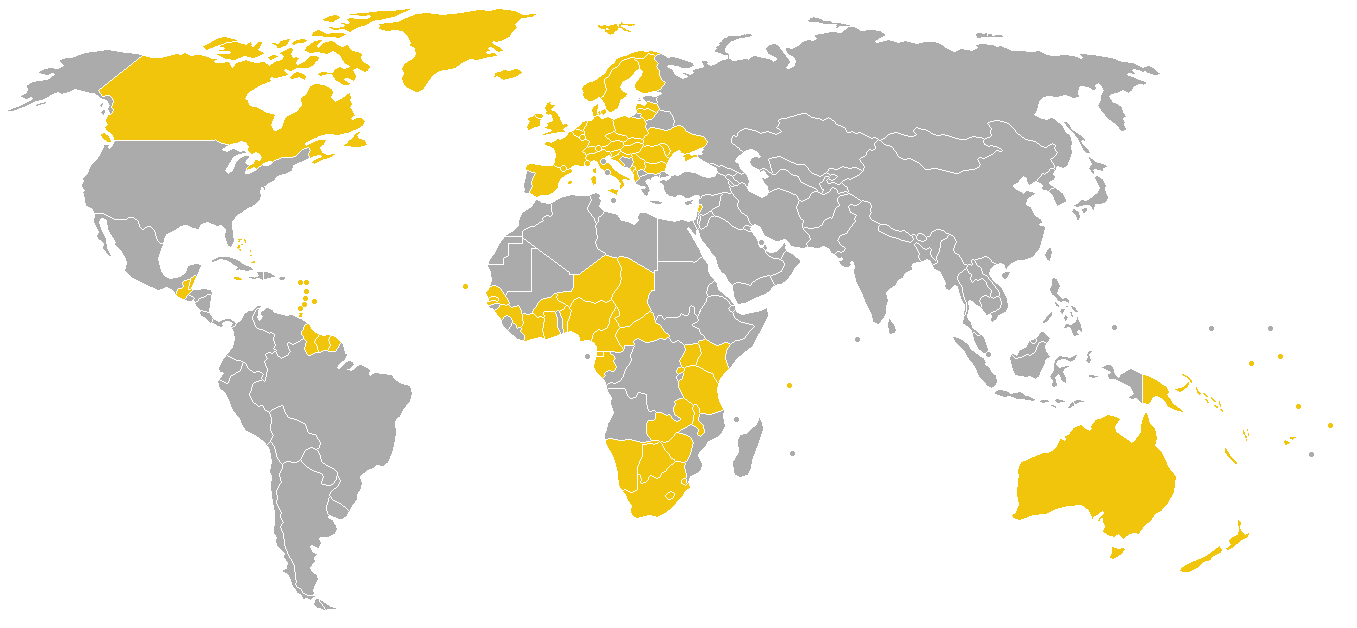
- Countries in which Easter Monday is a public holiday
- Type: Christian
- Date: Day after Easter Sunday
- 2025 date: April 21 (Western); April 21 (Eastern)
- 2026 date: April 6 (Western); April 13 (Eastern)
- 2027 date: March 29 (Western); May 3 (Eastern)
- 2028 date: April 17 (Western); April 17 (Eastern)

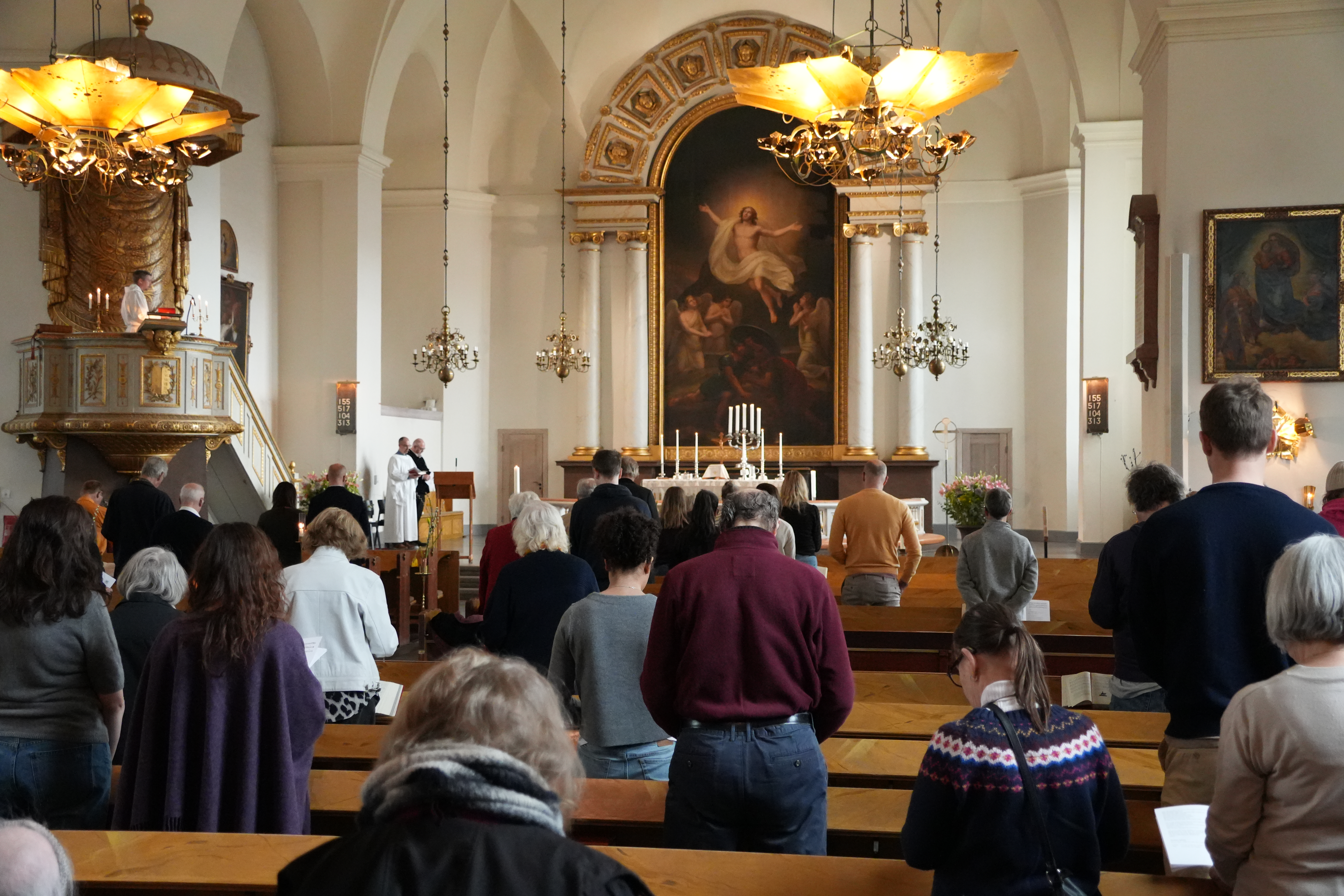
The celebration of Easter Monday Mass by Evangelical-Lutheran priests at Kungsholm Church, part of the Diocese of Stockholm in the Church of Sweden

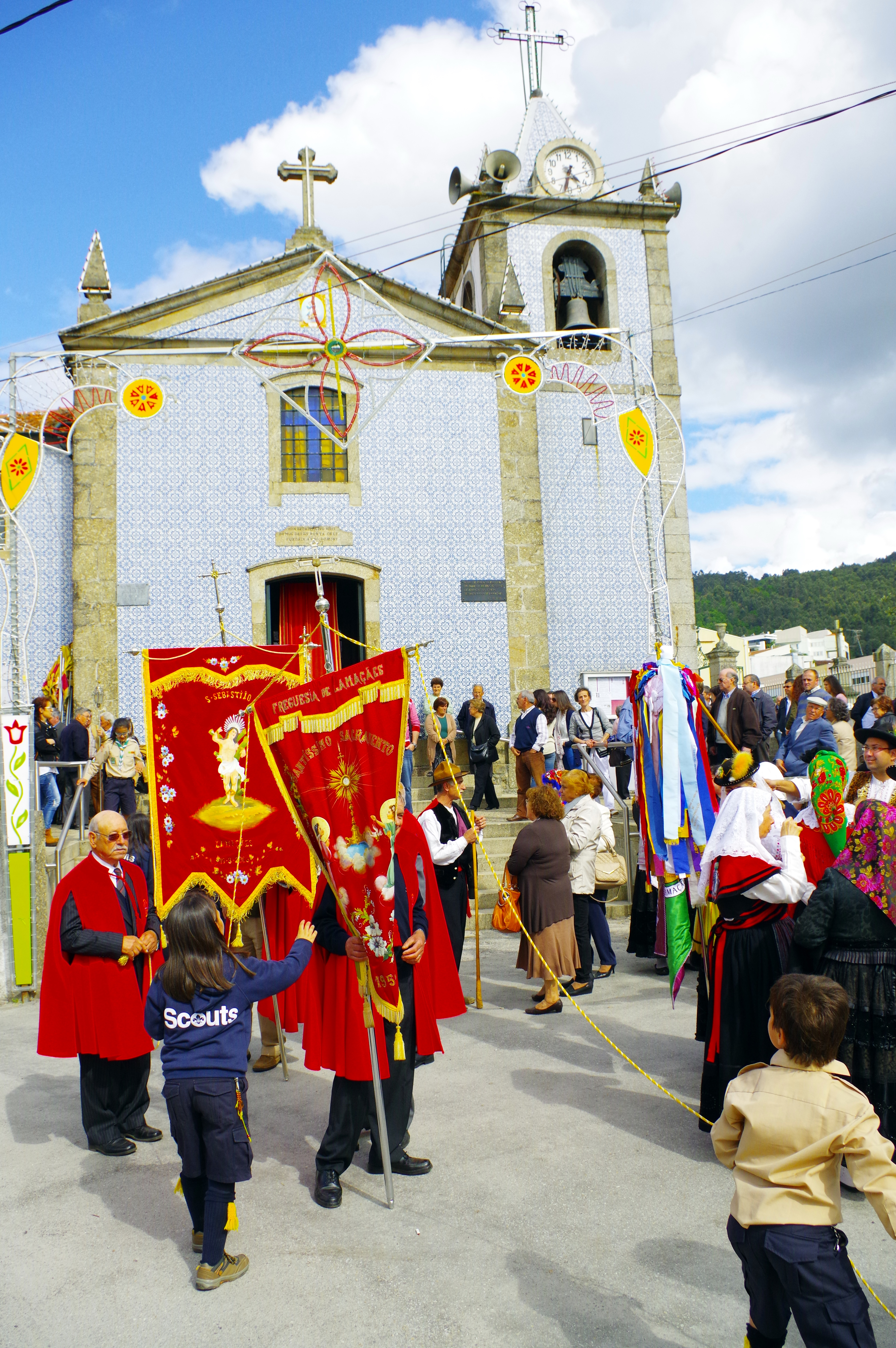
Easter Monday in Portugal

Easter Monday is the second day of Eastertide and a public holiday in more than 50 predominantly Christian countries. In Western Christianity it marks the second day of the Octave of Easter; in Eastern Christianity it marks the second day of Bright Week.

== Religious observances ==
=== Eastern Christianity ===
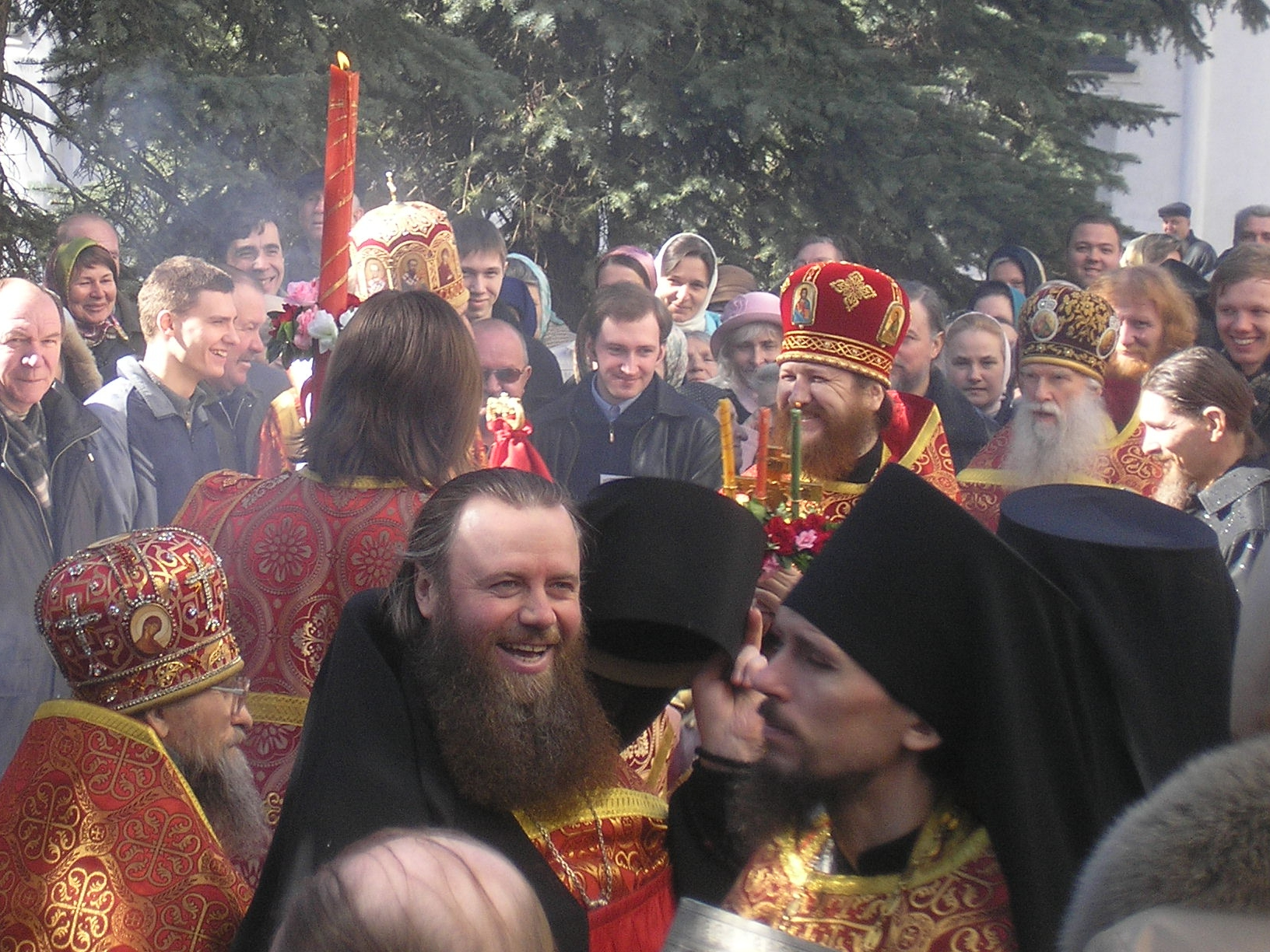
Blessing with holy water during an Eastern Orthodox Bright Week procession in Russia

In the Eastern Orthodox Church and Byzantine Rite Catholic Churches, this day is called "Bright Monday" or "Renewal Monday". The services, as in the rest of Bright Week, are quite different from during the rest of the year and are similar to the services on Pascha (Easter Sunday) and include an outdoor procession after the Divine Liturgy. While this is prescribed for all days of Bright Week, often they are only celebrated on Monday and maybe a couple of other days in parish churches, especially in non-Orthodox countries.

Should the calendar date for the feast day of a major saint (e.g. Saint George on April 23, or the patron saint of a church) or one's name day fall within Holy Week and Pascha itself, the feast is transferred to Easter Monday.

=== Western Christianity ===
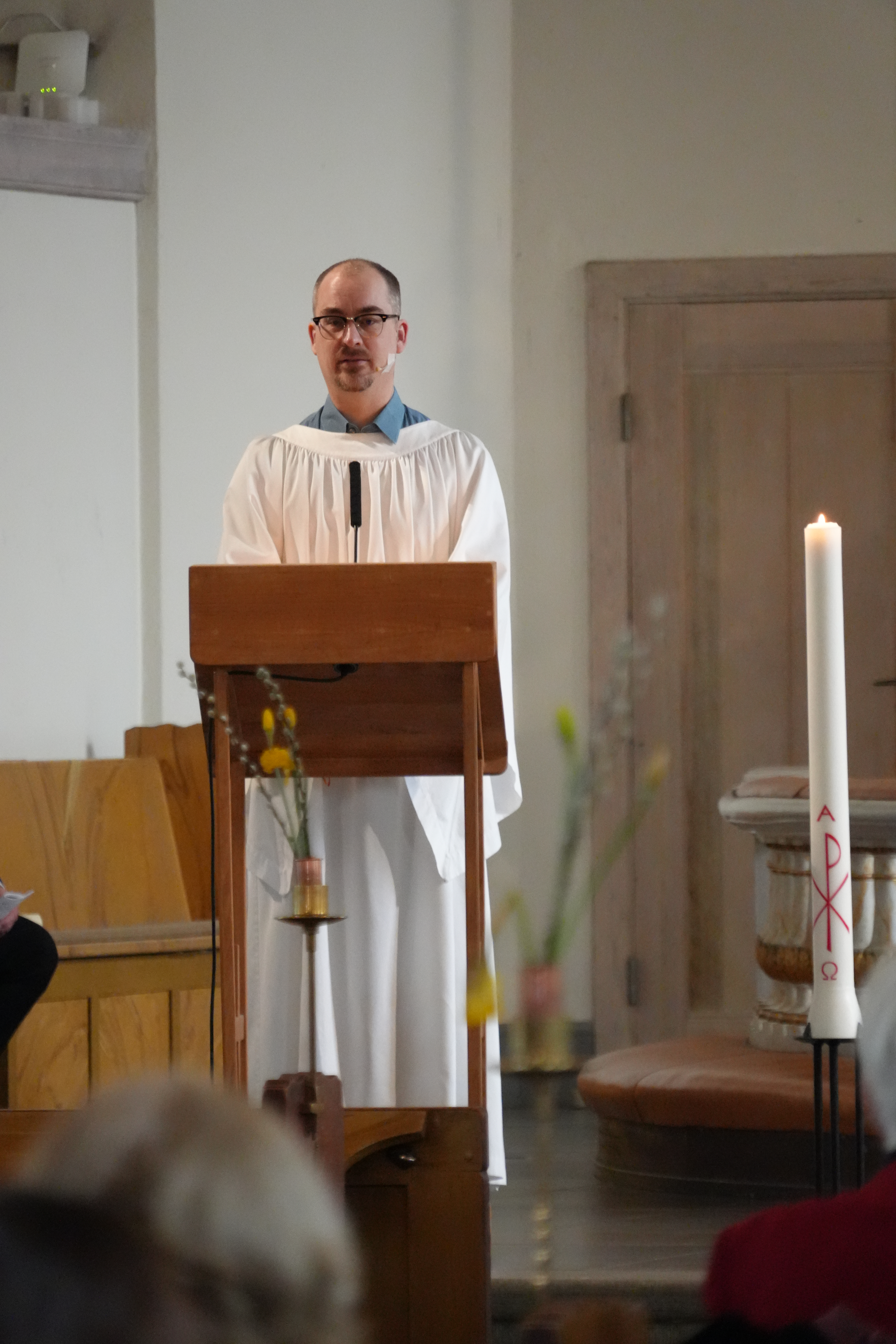
A lector does the first Scripture reading during the Mass of Easter Monday at Kungsholm Evangelical-Lutheran Church, part of the Diocese of Stockholm in Sweden (2026)

In Western Christianity, Easter Monday is the second day of Eastertide, as well as the second day in the Octave of Easter.

In the Lutheran Churches, the Gospel for Easter Monday concerns the Road to Emmaus appearance.

== National observances ==
=== Australia ===
In Australia, Easter Monday is a public holiday. Some people enjoy outdoor sporting events, such as the Oakbank Easter Racing Carnival in South Australia, and the Stawell Gift in Victoria, as well as a traditional AFL match between Geelong and Hawthorn at the MCG. Since 2014, The NRL have held the Easter Monday match (NRL) between the Parramatta Eels and Wests Tigers match at Stadium Australia.

=== Austria ===
In Austria and Southern Germany, there is the traditional "Emmausgang", commemorating the walk of the disciples to Emmaus, to which Jesus followed them without being recognized. Luke 24:13-35

=== Belarus ===
In Belarus, Easter Monday is generally not a public or official holiday, and most schools and businesses are open on this day, but is still celebrated by some people.

=== Canada ===
Easter Monday (French: Le Lundi de Pâques) is the Monday immediately following Easter Sunday and is a statutory holiday for federal employees. Although not mandatory by federal regulation, some employers also give this day off to employees out of common practice. Additionally, this holiday succeeds Good Friday (the Friday preceding Easter), a mandatory holiday for all employees, giving those workers an extra-long weekend in March or April. An exception to this rule is in Quebec, where employers must give either Good Friday or Easter Monday off to employees. Easter Weekend is the first provincial holiday after New Year's Day in provinces where Family Day, Islander Day, or Louis Riel Day are not observed.

=== Central Europe ===
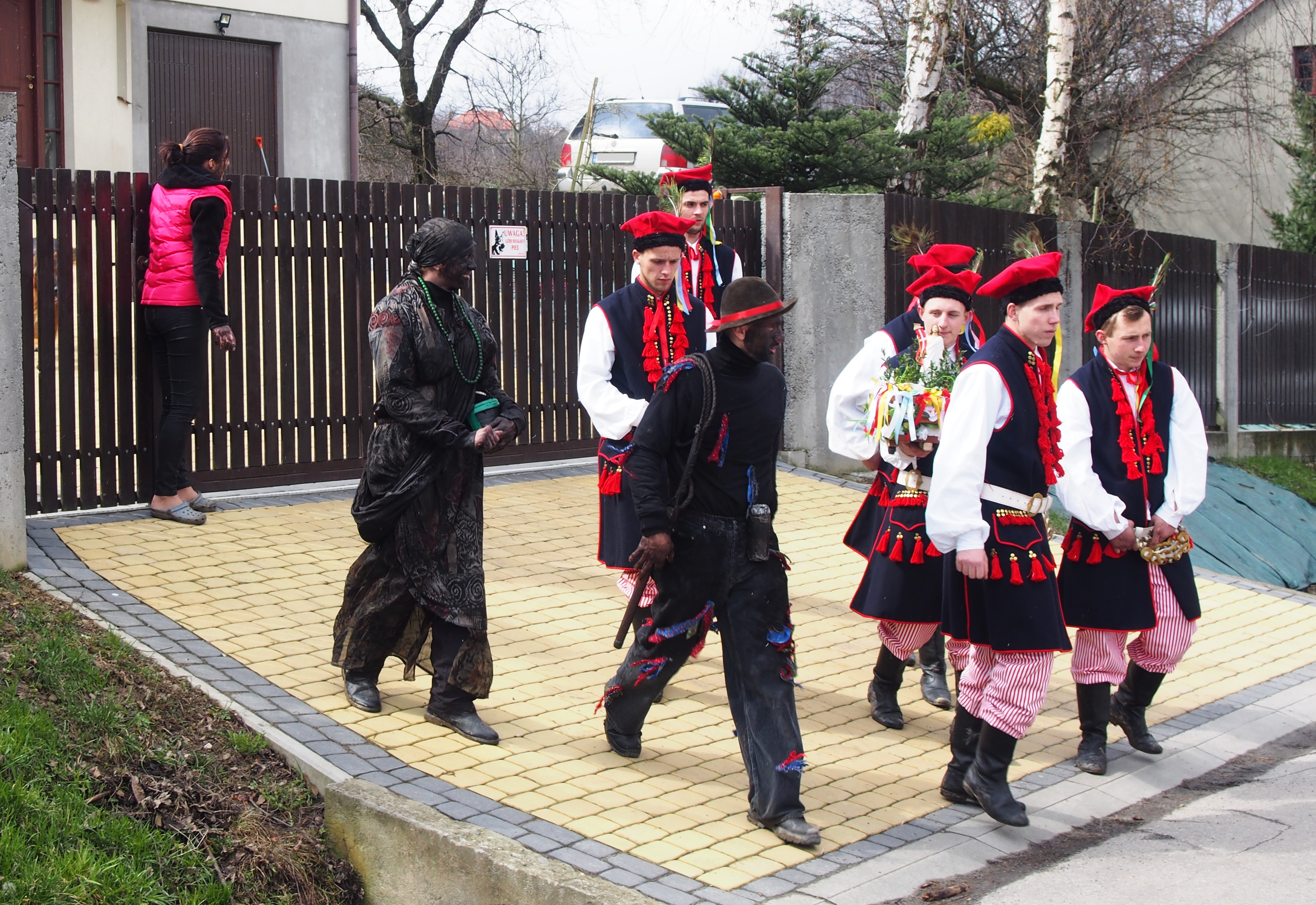
Easter Monday in Poland

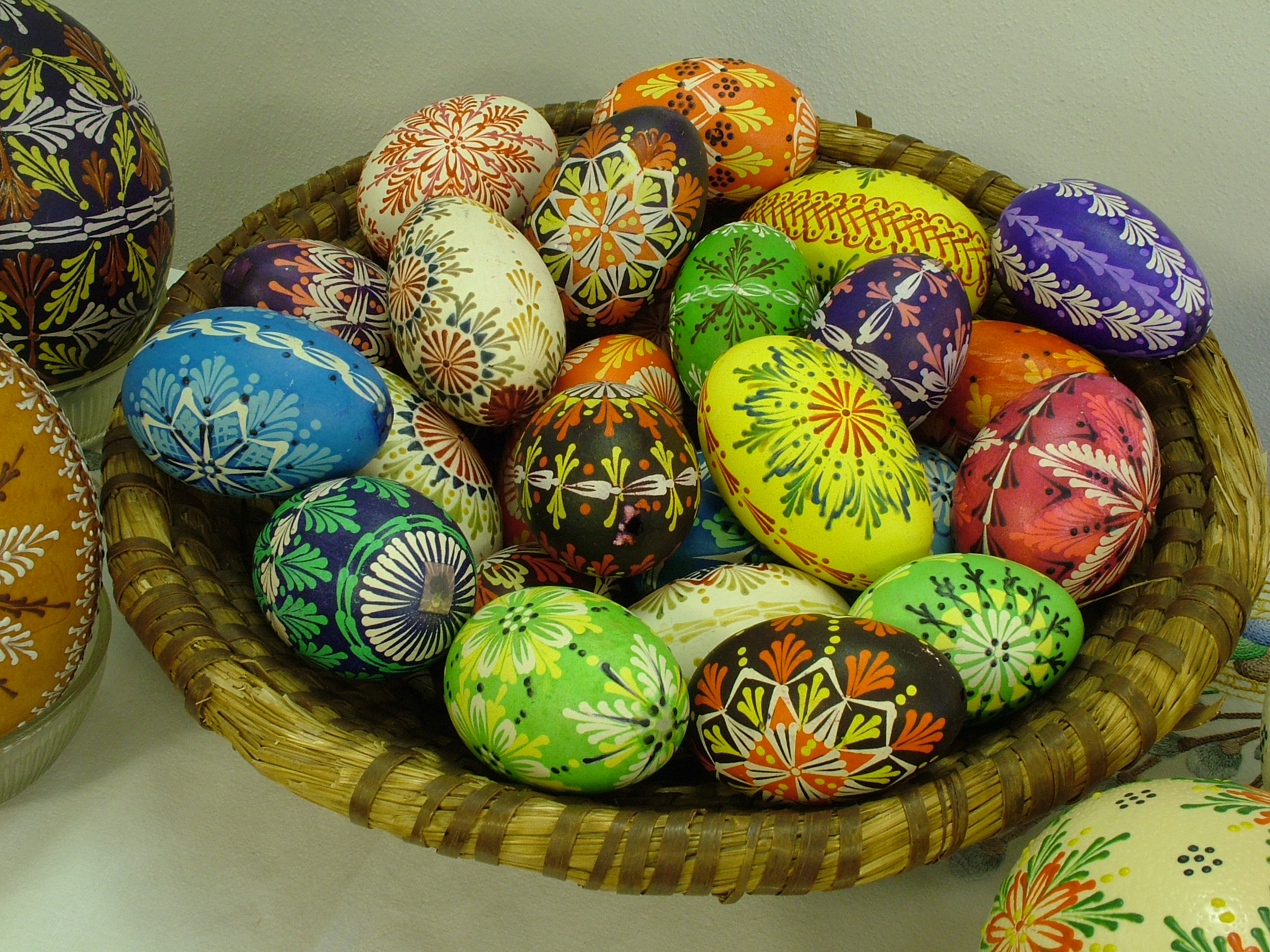
Easter eggs from the Czech Republic

Śmigus-dyngus (or lany poniedziałek, Polish for Wet Monday) is the name for Easter Monday in Poland and the diaspora. In the Czech Republic, it is called velikonoční pondělí, in Slovakia veľkonočný pondelok and in Hungary Vízbevető. All these Catholic countries (and some others) practice the unique ancient custom on this day. Traditionally, boys and men pour a bucket of water or perfume on girls and women or spank their buttocks and legs with long thin twigs (pussy willow) or switches made from willow, birch or decorated tree branches. A legend says that it keeps women healthy, beautiful, and fertile during the whole next year.

Another related custom, unique to Poland, is that of sprinkling bowls (garce) of ashes on people or houses, celebrated a few weeks earlier at the "półpoście". This custom is almost forgotten, but still practiced in the area around the borders of Masuria and Masovia.

=== Egypt ===
In Egypt, the ancient festival of Sham Ennessim (Egyptian Arabic: شم النسيم, literally meaning "smelling of the breeze") is celebrated by the Coptic Orthodox Church (i.e. Eastern) Easter Monday, though the festival dates back to Ancient Egypt times (about 2700 BC). It is an Egyptian national holiday. Traditional activities include painting eggshells of boiled eggs, taking meals outdoors, and eating boiled eggs, lettuce, fesikh (pickled mullet (fish)) with lemon and scallion.

=== Germany ===
In Germany, people go out into the fields early in the morning and hold Easter egg races. For Roman Catholics, Easter Monday is a Holy Day of Obligation.

=== Ghana ===
In Ghana, Easter Monday is considered a general public holiday to mark the Easter celebration. Two days are given as public holidays, Good Friday and the following Monday which is Easter Monday.

=== Greece ===
In Greece, Easter Monday is an official public and non-working holiday. It is a mandatory holiday imposed by the law where most schools, government offices, banks, stores, and most private businesses are closed. It is generally considered a time to spend with family and for those who are returning from holiday travel.

=== Ireland ===
In Ireland it is a day of remembrance for the men and women who died in the Easter Rising, which began on Easter Monday 1916. Until 1966, there was a parade of veterans, past the headquarters of the Irish Republican Army at the General Post Office (GPO) on O'Connell Street, and a reading of the Proclamation of the Irish Republic.

=== Italy ===
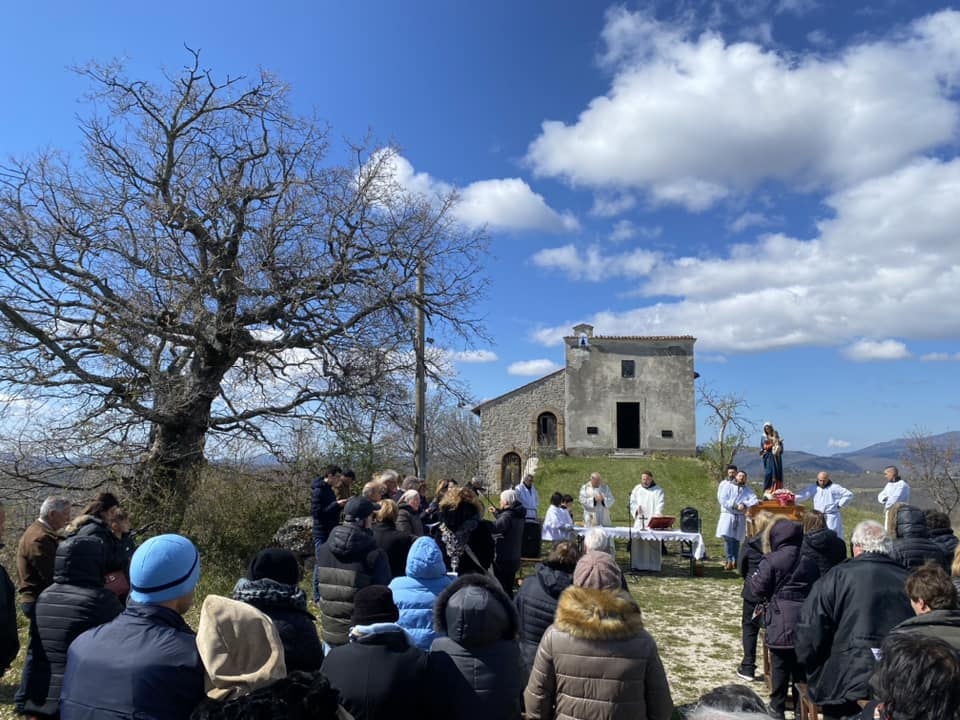
Easter Monday in Longone Sabino, Italy

In Italy, Easter Monday is an official public holiday and is called “Lunedì dell'Angelo” (“Monday of the Angel”), “Lunedì in Albis” or more commonly “Pasquetta”. It is customary to hold a family picnic in the countryside or have barbecues with friends.

=== New Zealand ===
In New Zealand it is a National Public Holiday. Schools often extend the weekend to the Tuesday to give students a 5-day break.

=== Nigeria ===
in Nigeria, Easter Monday is celebrated. It is a public holiday, along with Good Friday. In this period, therefore, Friday and Monday are public holdiays to mark the Easter celebration, after which people return to work and children to school. It is a highly commemorated day in Nigeria.

=== North Macedonia ===
In North Macedonia, Easter Monday is an official public holiday and is called Втор на Велигден (Vtor na Veligden), with many schools businesses closed on this day. It is a religious major observance for the Macedonian people who are Eastern Orthodox Christians.

=== Spain ===
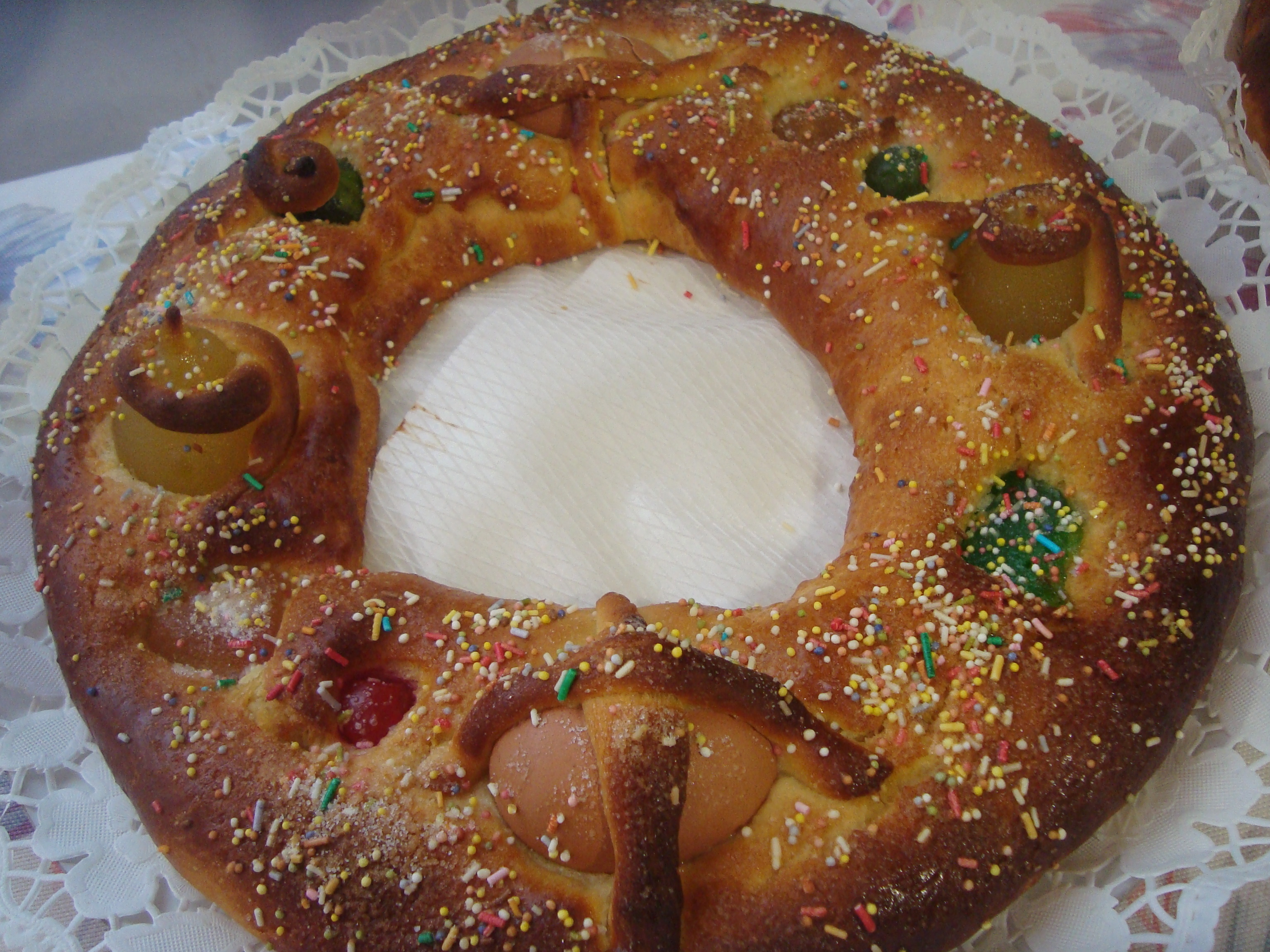
Traditional Easter mona

In Spain, Easter Monday is an official public holiday in Catalonia, the Valencian Community, the Balearic Islands, Navarre, the Basque Country, Cantabria, the village of Galvez, and La Rioja. In Catalonia, the Land of Valencia, and Murcia a feature of this day is a pastry called Easter mona. It is usually given by godparents to their godchildren, and it is traditional for families or groups of friends to gather for a trip somewhere, like the countryside, to eat the mona.

=== Netherlands ===
In the Netherlands, Easter Monday is an official public holiday. Apart from church services in some locations in the Dutch Bible Belt, there are no widespread festivities or traditions (aside from visiting the "meubelboulevard") for the "Second Easter Day" ("Tweede Paasdag").

=== United States ===
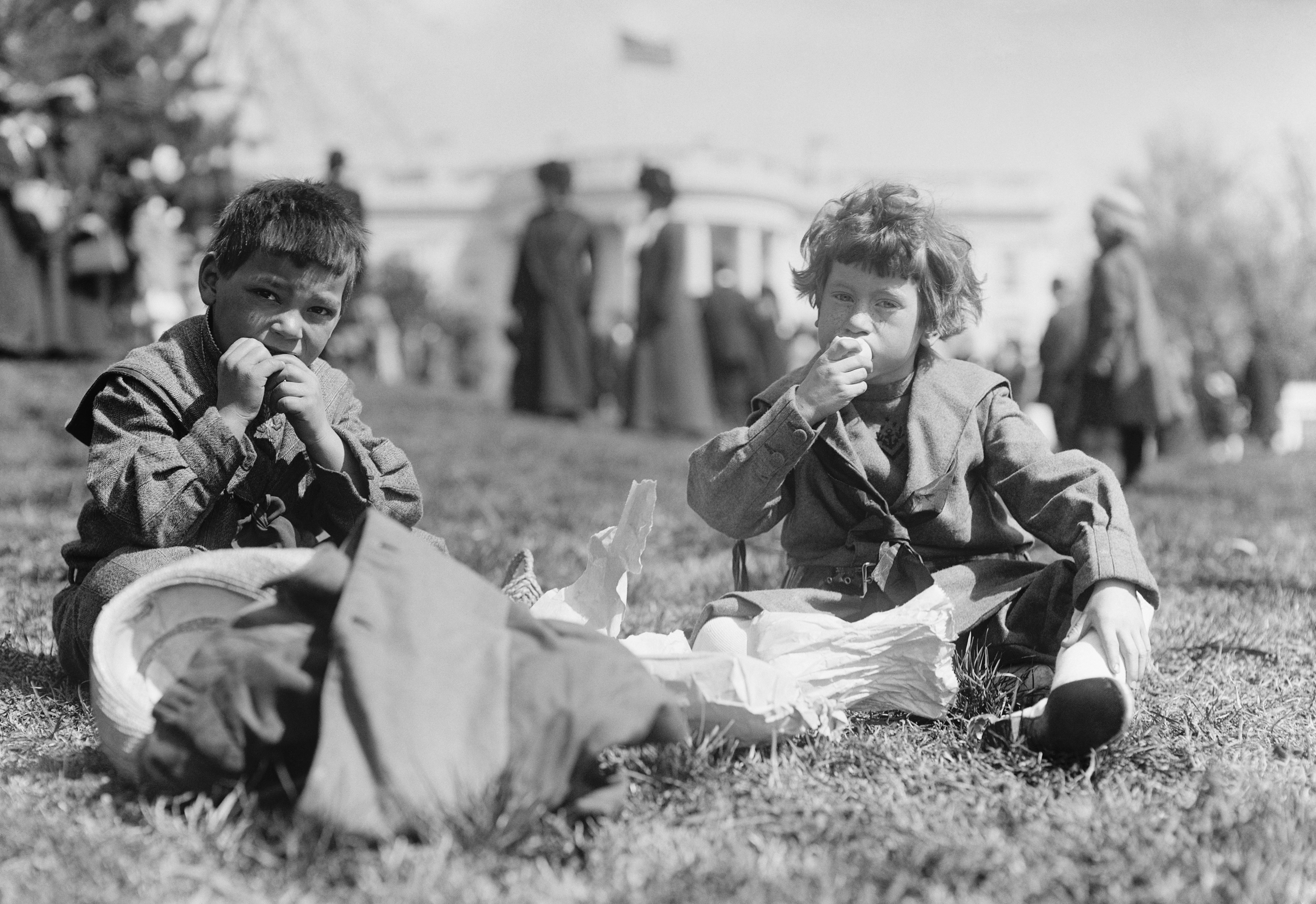
Two children enjoy treats during the annual Easter egg roll at the White House lawn on Easter Monday, 1911

In the United States, Easter Monday is not a federal holiday and there are few national observances apart from traditions such as the White House Easter egg roll. On a local level, the day is informally observed in some areas, such as North Dakota and some cities in New York, Michigan, and Indiana. Easter Monday was a public holiday in North Carolina from 1935 to 1987 due to the early-20th-century tradition of state government workers taking the day off to attend the annual baseball game between North Carolina State College and Wake Forest College. Texas and Maryland schools often have holidays on Good Friday and Easter Monday. In some states and districts, public schools and universities close on Easter Monday, often as part of spring break.

==== Dyngus Day ====
Traditionally Polish areas of the United States observe Easter Monday as Dyngus Day. Dyngus Day celebrations are widespread and popular in Chicago; Cleveland; Buffalo, New York; Wyandotte and Hamtramck in Michigan; South Bend and La Porte in Indiana; and Hanover, New Hampshire.

=== United Kingdom ===
Only England, Wales and Northern Ireland observe Easter Monday as a bank holiday, with many large retailers being closed. It is not an official public holiday in Scotland, but might be locally observed, with large retailers being open; but with reduced opening hours.

=== South Africa ===
In South Africa, Easter Monday is the last day of the holy weekend. It is known as Family Day and is a public holiday. After this day, people return to work and children to school, so it is a day of rest.

=== Ukraine ===
In Ukraine, Easter Monday is celebrated. It is a public holiday. After this day, people return to work and children to school, so it is a day of rest.

== See also ==
- Bright Week – Seven days beginning on Easter in Eastern Christianity
- Octave of Easter – Western Christianity celebration
