= Easter whip =

Easter tradition in Central Europe

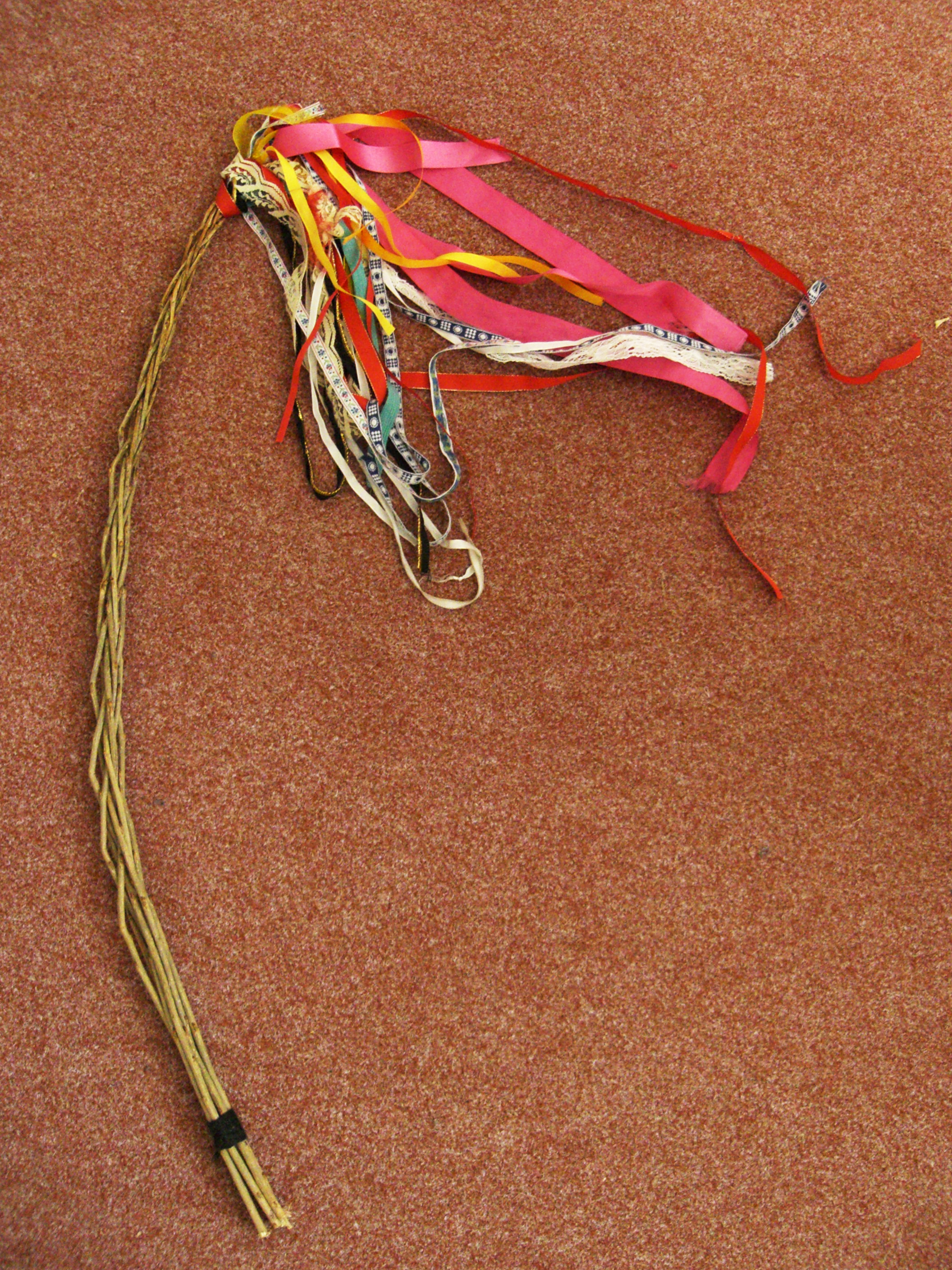
Czech pomlázka (handmade willow whip)

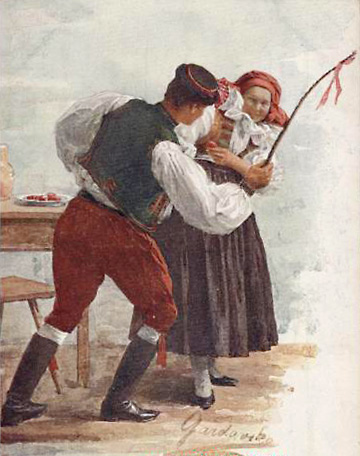
A pomlázka in use, depicted by Marie Gardavská (1871–1937)

In the Czech Republic, Slovakia, and parts of Hungary, the Easter whip is used as part of an Easter Monday tradition in which men strike women with a decorated willow whip or splash them with water.

The custom generally takes place on the morning of Easter Monday and involves a handmade whip or switch known as a pomlázka or karabáč in Czech; korbáč, šibák, or šibačka in Slovak; and siba or korbács in Hungarian. A pomlázka is typically made from four to twenty-four willow rods, measures between approximately half a metre and two metres in length, and is often decorated with coloured ribbons at the end.

Practices vary by locality. Participants may wear additional layers of clothing to lessen the impact of the whipping. In some areas, women traditionally respond to men who arrive after midday by throwing cold water on them. Other regional variants involve men spraying women with water or perfume (Śmigus-dyngus).

When visiting houses, men may recite or sing rhymes concerning eggs, spring, fertility, or generosity. Women traditionally give them decorated eggs or other gifts in return. In some versions of the custom, a woman is struck on the legs with the willow whip. The practice is traditionally understood as symbolic rather than as corporal punishment, although the force with which the whip is used varies.

Historically, boys and young men also pursued girls in village streets as part of the custom, a practice depicted in illustrations of traditional Easter celebrations. The custom has also attracted criticism over physical discomfort, humiliation, and alcohol consumption. A 2022 Czech survey reported that 79% of female respondents disliked the pomlázka, with respondents citing pain, bruising, and humiliation among their concerns. In the same research, approximately one-third of respondents identified excessive alcohol consumption as a significant problem associated with the custom.

In traditional belief, being struck with the willow whip is associated with health, beauty, youth, and fertility during the following year. According to a 2019 survey, 60% of Czech households practised some form of Easter Monday whipping or water-splashing.

Related Easter customs involving branches or water occur elsewhere in Central and Eastern Europe. In Croatia, a whip may be made from olive twigs but is not used to strike people. In Poland, decorated Easter palms, including Palma Kurpiowska, may incorporate pussy willow and form part of Easter observances. These customs have different origins and practices from the Czech, Slovak, and Hungarian Easter-whipping traditions.

== Etymology ==
The Czech karabáč, Slovak korbáč, and Hungarian korbács are terms for types of whip. The Slovak word korbáč, distinct from the more general bič, refers particularly to a plaited or wicker whip. These words are ultimately derived from Turkish kırbaç ("whip").

In Czech, the Easter whip is commonly called a pomlázka. The word is associated with the concept of rejuvenation.

== See also ==
- Easter traditions
